= Qatar national football team results (2020–present) =

This article provides details of international football games played by the Qatar national football team from 2020 to present.

== Results ==
Key
Win
Draw
Defeat

=== 2020 ===
12 October 2020 Friendly	Ghana	5–1	Qatar	Aksu, Turkey
18:30 UTC+3	Fosu 22'; A. Ayew 63', 83'; Owusu 65'; Ekuban 87'	Report	Ali 44'	Stadium: Mardan Sports Complex; Referee: Hüseyin Göçek (Turkey)

13 November 2020 Friendly	Costa Rica	1–1	Qatar	Maria Enzersdorf, Austria
18:00 UTC+1	Campbell 67'	Report	Al-Haydos 42' (pen.)	Stadium: BSFZ-Arena; Attendance: 0 Referee: Sebastian Gishamer (Austria)

17 November 2020 Friendly	South Korea	2–1	Qatar	Maria Enzersdorf, Austria
14:00 UTC+1	Hwang Ui-jo 1'; Hwang Hee-chan 36'	Report	Ali 9'	Stadium: BSFZ-Arena; Attendance: 0 Referee: Julian Weinberger (Austria)

4 December 2020 2022 World Cup qualification	Qatar	5–0	Bangladesh	Al Rayyan, Qatar
19:00 UTC+3	Hatem 9'; Afif 33', 90+2'; Ali 72' (pen.), 78'	Report (FIFA); Report (AFC)		Stadium: Jassim bin Hamad Stadium; Attendance: 0 Referee: Mohd Amirul Izwan Yaacob (Malaysia)

=== 2021 ===
24 March 2021 Friendly	Qatar	1–0	Luxembourg	Debrecen, Hungary
12:00 UTC+1	Muntari 12'	Report		Stadium: Nagyerdei Stadion; Attendance: 0 Referee: Miloš Đorđić (Serbia)

27 March 2021 Friendly	Qatar	2–1	Azerbaijan	Debrecen, Hungary
18:00 UTC+1	Al-Haydos 55' (pen.), 58'	Report	Sheydayev 16' (pen.)	Stadium: Nagyerdei Stadion; Attendance: 0 Referee: Ivan Kružliak (Slovakia)

30 March 2021 Friendly	Qatar	1–1	Republic of Ireland	Debrecen, Hungary
20:45 UTC+2	Muntari 47'	Report	McClean 4'	Stadium: Nagyerdei Stadion; Attendance: 0 Referee: Balázs Berke (Hungary)

3 June 2021 2022 World Cup qualification	India	0–1	Qatar	Al Rayyan, Qatar
20:00 UTC+3		Report	Hatem 33'	Stadium: Jassim bin Hamad Stadium; Attendance: 2,022; Referee: Ma Ning (China)

7 June 2021 2022 World Cup qualification	Oman	0–1	Qatar	Al Rayyan, Qatar
20:00 UTC+3		Report	Al-Haydos 39' (pen.)	Stadium: Jassim bin Hamad Stadium; Attendance: 1,559; Referee: Hettikamkanamge Perera (Sri Lanka)

4 July 2021 Friendly	Qatar	1–0	El Salvador	Pula, Croatia
18:30 UTC+2	Ali 69'	Report		Stadium: Stadion Aldo Drosina; Referee: Ivan Bebek (Croatia)

13 July 2021 2021 Gold Cup	Qatar	3–3	Panama	Houston, United States
19:57 UTC−5 (Note: The match, originally scheduled at 19:00 EDT (UTC−4), was delayed until 20:57 EDT due to thunderstorms in the area.)	Afif 48'; Ali 53'; Al-Haydos 63' (pen.)	Report	Blackburn 51', 58'; Davis 79' (pen.)	Stadium: BBVA Stadium; Attendance: 10,625; Referee: César Ramos (Mexico)

17 July 2021 2021 Gold Cup	Grenada	0–4	Qatar	Houston, United States
18:30 UTC−5		Report	Hatem 11'; Afif 22'; Muntari 36'; Ali 46'	Stadium: BBVA Stadium; Referee: Armando Villarreal (United States)

20 July 2021 2021 Gold Cup	Honduras	0–2	Qatar	Houston, United States
20:00 UTC−5		Report	Ahmed 25'; Hatem 90+4'	Stadium: BBVA Stadium; Referee: Jair Marrufo (United States)

24 July 2021 2021 Gold Cup QF	Qatar	3–2	El Salvador	Glendale, United States
16:30 UTC−7	Ali 2', 55' (pen.); Hatem 8'	Report	Rivas 63', 66'	Stadium: State Farm Stadium; Attendance: 64,211; Referee: Fernando Hernández (Mexico)

29 July 2021 2021 Gold Cup SF	Qatar	0–1	United States	Austin, United States
18:30 UTC−5		Report	Zardes 86'	Stadium: Q2 Stadium; Attendance: 20,500; Referee: Juan Gabriel Calderón (Costa Rica)

1 September 2021 Friendly	Qatar	0–4	Serbia	Debrecen, Hungary
20:45 UTC+2		Report	Khoukhi 2' (o.g.); Jović 17'; Vlahović 60'; Milenković 84'	Stadium: Nagyerdei Stadion; Referee: Filip Glova (Slovakia)

4 September 2021 Friendly	Qatar	1–3	Portugal	Debrecen, Hungary
18:45 UTC+2	Hassan 61'	Report	Silva 23'; Otávio 25'; Fernandes 88' (pen.)	Stadium: Nagyerdei Stadion; Referee: Gergő Bogár (Hungary)

7 September 2021 Friendly	Luxembourg	1–1	Qatar	Luxembourg, Luxembourg
20:45 UTC+2	Borges Sanches 31'	Report	Ahmed 43'	Stadium: Stade de Luxembourg; Referee: Jonathan Lardot (Belgium)

9 October 2021 Friendly	Portugal	3–0	Qatar	Faro/Loulé, Portugal
20:15 UTC+1	Ronaldo 37'; Fonte 48'; A. Silva 90'	Report		Stadium: Estádio Algarve; Referee: Fedayi San (Switzerland)

12 October 2021 Friendly	Republic of Ireland	4–0	Qatar	Dublin, Republic of Ireland
19:45 UTC+0	Robinson 4', 13' (pen.), 53'; Duffy 59'	Report		Stadium: Aviva Stadium; Referee: Keith Kennedy (Northern Ireland)

11 November 2021 Friendly	Serbia	4–0	Qatar	Belgrade, Serbia
18:00 UTC+1	Lukić 45+2'; Jović 51'; Vlahović 53'; Milinković-Savić 83'	Report		Stadium: Stadion Rajko Mitić; Referee: Irfan Peljto (Bosnia and Herzegovina)

14 November 2021 Friendly	Azerbaijan	2–2	Qatar	Baku, Azerbaijan
21:00 UTC+4	Mahmudov 37' (pen.), 67'	Report	Ali 23', 78'	Stadium: Olympic Stadium; Referee: Donatas Rumšas (Lithuania)

30 November 2021 2021 FIFA Arab Cup	Qatar	1–0	Bahrain	Al Khor, Qatar
19:00 UTC+3	Hatem 69'	Report		Stadium: Al Bayt Stadium; Attendance: 47,813; Referee: Szymon Marciniak (Poland)

3 December 2021 2021 FIFA Arab Cup	Oman	1–2	Qatar	Al Rayyan, Qatar
16:00 UTC+3	Al-Hajri 74'	Report	Afif 32' (pen.); Durbin 90+7' (o.g.)	Stadium: Education City Stadium; Attendance: 23,254; Referee: Wilton Sampaio (Brazil)

6 December 2021 2021 FIFA Arab Cup	Qatar	3–0	Iraq	Al Khor, Qatar
22:00 UTC+3	Ali 82'; Afif 84'; Al-Haydos 90+4'	Report		Stadium: Al Bayt Stadium; Attendance: 23,008; Referee: Bakary Gassama (Gambia)

10 December 2021 2021 FIFA Arab Cup QF	Qatar	5–0	United Arab Emirates	Al Khor, Qatar
22:00 UTC+3	Salmeen 6' (o.g.); Ali 28' (pen.), 45+3'; Khoukhi 36' (pen.); Hatem 44'	Report		Stadium: Al Bayt Stadium; Attendance: 63,439; Referee: Andrés Matonte (Uruguay)

15 December 2021 2021 FIFA Arab Cup SF	Qatar	1–2	Algeria	Doha, Qatar
22:00 UTC+3	Muntari 90+7'	Report	Benayada 59'; Belaïli 90+17'	Stadium: Al Thumama Stadium; Attendance: 42,405; Referee: Szymon Marciniak (Poland)

18 December 2021 2021 FIFA Arab Cup 3rd	Egypt	0–0 (a.e.t.) (4–5 p)	Qatar	Doha, Qatar
13:00 UTC+3		Report		Stadium: Stadium 974; Attendance: 30,978; Referee: Facundo Tello (Argentina)
	Penalties
	Magdy (penalty scored); El Solia (penalty scored); Hegazi (penalty missed); Fotouh (penalty scored); Tawfik (penalty scored); Sherif (penalty missed)		Al-Haydos (penalty missed); Khoukhi (penalty scored); Hassan (penalty scored); Alaaeldin (penalty scored); Afif (penalty scored); Boudiaf (penalty scored)

=== 2022 ===
26 March 2022 Friendly	Qatar	2–1	Bulgaria	Al Rayyan, Qatar
17:30 UTC+3	Afif 27' (pen.); Khoukhi 72'	Report	Despodov 60'	Stadium: Education City Stadium; Referee: Mohammed Al Hoish (Saudi Arabia)

29 March 2022 Friendly	Qatar	0–0	Slovenia	Al Rayyan, Qatar
19:30 UTC+3		Report		Stadium: Education City Stadium; Referee: Youssef Essrayri (Tunisia)

20 August 2022 Friendly	Qatar	2–2	Morocco	Wiener Neustadt, Austria
18:30 UTC+2	Assadalla 11'; Correia 65'	Report	Jabrane 13' (pen.); Oubila 42'	Stadium: Stadion Wiener Neustadt

23 August 2022 Friendly	Qatar	2–1	Ghana	Vienna, Austria
18:30 UTC+2	Alaaeldin 11'; Kheder 24'	Source Source	Ró-Ró 68' (o.g.)	Stadium: Ernst-Happel-Stadion

26 August 2022 Friendly	Qatar	1–1	Jamaica	Wiener Neustadt, Austria
18:30 UTC+2	Muneer 83'	Report	Fletcher 70'	Stadium: Stadion Wiener Neustadt; Referee: Sebastian Gishamer (Austria)

20 September 2022 Unofficial friendly	Qatar	0–3	Croatia U23	Wiener Neustadt, Austria
18:00 UTC+2		Report	Teklić 14' (pen.); Mitrović 16'; Kulenović 87'	Stadium: Stadion Wiener Neustadt; Referee: Stevan Radenovic (Austria)

23 September 2022 Friendly	Qatar	0–2	Canada	Vienna, Austria
19:00 UTC+2		Report	Larin 4'; David 13'	Stadium: Franz Horr Stadium; Referee: Manuel Schüttengruber (Austria)

27 September 2022 Friendly	Qatar	2–2	Chile	Vienna, Austria
19:00 UTC+2	Afif 59'; Al Haydos 67'	Report	Sánchez 37'; Vidal 78'	Stadium: Franz Horr Stadium; Referee: Julian Weinberger (Austria)

13 October 2022 Unofficial friendly	Qatar	2–1	Nicaragua	San Pedro Alcántara, Spain
20:00 UTC+2		Report		Stadium: Marbella Football Center

23 October 2022 Friendly	Qatar	2–0	Guatemala	San Pedro Alcántara, Spain
18:30 UTC+2	Al Haydos 38' (pen.), 40' (pen.)	Report		Stadium: Marbella Football Center

27 October 2022 Friendly	Qatar	1–0	Honduras	Marbella, Spain
18:30 UTC+2	Almoez Ali 60'	Report		Stadium: Estadio Municipal de Marbella

5 November 2022 Friendly	Qatar	2–1	Panama	Marbella, Spain
18:30 UTC+2	Almoez 18'; Boudiaf 23'	Report	Bárcenas 66' (pen.)	Stadium: Estadio Municipal de Marbella

9 November 2022 Friendly	Albania	0–1	Qatar	Marbella, Spain
18:30 UTC+2			Ali 38' (pen.)	Stadium: Estadio Municipal de Marbella

20 November 2022 2022 FIFA World Cup	Qatar	0–2	Ecuador	Al Khor, Qatar
13:00 UTC+3		Report	Valencia 16' (pen.), 32'	Stadium: Al Bayt Stadium; Attendance: 67,372; Referee: Daniele Orsato (Italy)

25 November 2022 2022 FIFA World Cup	Qatar	1–3	Senegal	Doha, Qatar
16:00 UTC+3	Muntari 78'	Report	Dia 41'; Diedhiou 48'; Dieng 84'	Stadium: Al Thumama Stadium; Attendance: 41,797; Referee: Antonio Mateu Lahoz (Spain)

29 November 2022 2022 FIFA World Cup	Netherlands	2–0	Qatar	Al Khor, Qatar
18:00 UTC+3	Gakpo 26'; F. de Jong 49'	Report		Stadium: Al Bayt Stadium; Attendance: 66,784; Referee: Bakary Gassama (Gambia)

=== 2023 ===
7 January 2023 25th Arabian Gulf Cup	Kuwait	0–2	Qatar	Basra, Iraq
19:15 UTC+3		Report	Surag 23'; Alaaeldin 38' (pen.)	Stadium: Al-Minaa Olympic Stadium; Referee: Ma Ning (China)

10 January 2023 25th Arabian Gulf Cup	Qatar	1–2	Bahrain	Basra, Iraq
19:15 UTC+3	Alaaedin 34'	Report	Waad 72' (o.g.); Helal 89' (pen.)	Stadium: Al-Minaa Olympic Stadium; Referee: Ilgiz Tantashev (Uzbekistan)

13 January 2023 25th Arabian Gulf Cup	Qatar	1–1	United Arab Emirates	Basra, Iraq
18:00 UTC+3	Al-Abdullah 88'	Report	Lima 77'	Stadium: Al-Minaa Olympic Stadium; Referee: Ali Sabah (Iraq)

16 January 2023 Gulf Cup SF	Iraq	2–1	Qatar	Basra, Iraq
16:15 UTC+3	Bayesh 19'; Hussein 43'	Report	Surag 28'	Stadium: Basra International Stadium; Referee: Ma Ning (China)

8 June 2023 Hybrid friendly	Qatar	0–1	Croatia U23	Vorau, Austria
18:00 UTC		Report	Matanović 79'	Stadium: Ukraft Arena

15 June 2023 Friendly	Jamaica	1–2	Qatar	Wiener Neustadt, Austria
18:00 UTC+2	Nicholson 61' (pen.)	Report	Al Amin 31'; Muntari 39'	Stadium: Stadion Wiener Neustadt; Referee: Stefan Ebner (Austria)

19 June 2023 Friendly	Qatar	Abandoned	New Zealand	Vienna, Austria
--:-- UTC+2		Report	Stamenić 17'	Stadium: Franz Horr Stadium
Note: Match was abandoned at halftime after Qatar winger, Yusuf Abdurisag, was alleged to have racially abused New Zealand centre-back, Michael Boxall.

25 June 2023 Gold Cup GS	Haiti	2–1	Qatar	Houston, United States
17:00 UTC−5	Nazon 45+1' (pen.); Pierrot 90+7'	Report	Abdurisag 20'	Stadium: NRG Stadium; Attendance: 66,255; Referee: Daneon Parchment (Jamaica)

29 June 2023 Gold Cup GS	Qatar	1–1	Honduras	Glendale, United States
16:45 UTC−7	Al-Abdullah 7'	Report	Elis 90+6'	Stadium: State Farm Stadium; Attendance: 34,517; Referee: Armando Villarreal (United States)

2 July 2023 Gold Cup GS	Mexico	0–1	Qatar	Santa Clara, United States
18:00 UTC−7		Report	Shehata 27'	Stadium: Levi's Stadium; Attendance: 60,347; Referee: Drew Fischer (Canada)

8 July 2023 Gold Cup QF	Panama	4–0	Qatar	Arlington, United States
18:00 UTC−5	Bárcenas 19'; Díaz 56', 63', 65'	Report		Stadium: AT&T Stadium; Attendance: 60,355; Referee: César Ramos (Mexico)

7 September 2023 Friendly	Qatar	1–2	Kenya	Al Wakrah, Qatar
	Al-Haydos 34' (pen.)	Report	Okumu 20'; Nondi 90+1'	Stadium: Al Janoub Stadium

12 September 2023 Friendly	Qatar	1–1	Russia	Al Wakrah, Qatar
18:15 UTC+3	Alaaeldin 70'	Report	Soldatenkov 90'	Stadium: Al Janoub Stadium; Referee: Ahmed Al-Kaf (Oman)

12 October 2023 2023 Jordan International Tournament	Qatar	0–0 (6–5 p)	Iraq	Amman, Jordan
18:00 UTC+3				Stadium: Amman International Stadium
	Penalties
	Al-Haydos (penalty scored); Fatehi (penalty missed); Alaaeldin (penalty missed); Suhail (penalty scored); Afif (penalty scored); Al-Brake (penalty scored); Gaber (penalty scored); Meshaal (penalty scored)		Doski (penalty scored); Al-Hamadi (penalty missed); Ali (penalty missed); Adnan (penalty scored); Allée (penalty scored); Al-Ammari (penalty scored); Sulaka (penalty scored); Resan (penalty missed)

17 October 2023 2023 Jordan International Tournament	Iran	4–0	Qatar	Amman, Jordan
21:00 UTC+3	Kanaanizadegan 69', 79'; Jahanbakhsh 73'; Azmoun 75'			Stadium: Amman International Stadium

16 November 2023 2026 FIFA WCQ & 2027 ACQ R2	Qatar	8–1	Afghanistan	Al Rayyan, Qatar
18:45 UTC+3	Al-Haydos 11'; Ali 15', 26', 33' (pen.), 45+3' (pen.); Meshaal 18'; Alaaeldin 53' (pen.); Al-Abdullah 90+4'	Report	Sharifi 13'	Stadium: Khalifa International Stadium; Attendance: 19,374; Referee: Talaat Najm (Lebanon)

21 November 2023 2026 FIFA WCQ & 2027 ACQ R2	India	0–3	Qatar	Bhubaneswar, India
19:00 UTC+5:30		Report	Meshaal 4'; Ali 47'; Abdurisag 86'	Stadium: Kalinga Stadium; Attendance: 11,389; Referee: Sivakorn Pu-udom (Thailand)

31 December 2023 Friendly	Qatar	3–0	Cambodia	Al Rayyan, Qatar
10:00 UTC+3	Ali 12', 20', 43'	Report		Stadium: Thani bin Jassim Stadium; Referee: Mahmood Al-Majarafi (Oman)

=== 2024 ===
5 January 2024 Unofficial friendly	Qatar	1–2	Jordan	Al Rayyan, Qatar
19:00 UTC+3	Afif 15'	Report	Al-Naimat 50'; Olwan 57' (pen.)	Stadium: Thani bin Jassim Stadium; Referee: Ammar Ashkanani (Kuwait)

12 January 2024 2023 AFC Asian Cup GS	Qatar	3–0	Lebanon	Lusail, Qatar
19:00 UTC+3	Afif 45', 90+6'; Ali 56'	Report		Stadium: Lusail Stadium; Attendance: 82,490; Referee: Alireza Faghani (Australia)

17 January 2024 2023 AFC Asian Cup GS	Tajikistan	0–1	Qatar	Al Khor, Qatar
20:30 UTC+3		Report	Afif 17'	Stadium: Al Bayt Stadium; Attendance: 57,460; Referee: Hiroyuki Kimura (Japan)

22 January 2024 2023 AFC Asian Cup GS	Qatar	1–0	China	Al Rayyan, Qatar
18:00 UTC+3	Al-Haydos 66'	Report		Stadium: Khalifa International Stadium; Attendance: 42,104; Referee: Abdullah Jamali (Kuwait)

29 January 2024 2023 AFC Asian Cup round of 16	Qatar	2–1	Palestine	Al Khor, Qatar
14:30 UTC+3	Al-Haydos 45+6'; Afif 49' (pen.)	Report	Dabbagh 37'	Stadium: Al Bayt Stadium; Attendance: 63,753; Referee: Ma Ning (China)

3 February 2024 2023 AFC Asian Cup QF	Qatar	1–1 (a.e.t.) (3–2 p)	Uzbekistan	Al Khor, Qatar
18:30 UTC+3	Al-Haydos 27'	Report	Hamrobekov 59'	Stadium: Al Bayt Stadium; Attendance: 58,791; Referee: Kim Hee-gon (South Korea)
	Penalties
	Afif (penalty scored); Almoez (penalty missed); Ali Mukhtar (penalty missed); Al-Brake (penalty scored); Ró-Ró (penalty scored)		(penalty scored) Shukurov; (penalty missed) Ashurmatov; (penalty scored) Umarov; (penalty missed) Abdurakhmatov; (penalty missed) Masharipov

7 February 2024 2023 AFC Asian Cup SF	Iran	2–3	Qatar	Doha, Qatar
18:00 UTC+3	Azmoun 4'; Jahanbakhsh 51' (pen.)	Report	Gaber 17'; Afif 43'; Almoez 82'	Stadium: Al Thumama Stadium; Referee: Ahmad Al-Ali (Kuwait)

10 February 2024 2023 AFC Asian Cup F	Jordan	1–3	Qatar	Lusail, Qatar
18:00 UTC+3	Al-Naimat 67'	Report	Afif 22' (pen.), 73' (pen.), 90+5' (pen.)	Stadium: Lusail Stadium; Attendance: 86,492; Referee: Ma Ning (China)

21 March 2026 FIFA WCQ & 2027 ACQ R2	Qatar	3–0	Kuwait	Al Rayyan, Qatar
21:30 UTC+3	Afif 47', 68'; Al-Rawi 51'	Report		Stadium: Jassim bin Hamad Stadium; Attendance: 9,826; Referee: Jumpei Iida (Japan)

26 March 2026 FIFA WCQ & 2027 ACQ R2	Kuwait	1–2	Qatar	Farwaniya, Kuwait
22:00 UTC+3	Daham 79'	Report	Ali 77', 80'	Stadium: Ali Sabah Al-Salem Stadium; Attendance: 8,460; Referee: Sadullo Gulmurodi (Tajikistan)

6 June 2026 FIFA WCQ & 2027 ACQ R2	Afghanistan	0–0	Qatar	Hofuf, Saudi Arabia
19:00 UTC+3		Report		Stadium: Prince Abdullah bin Jalawi Sport City; Attendance: 651; Referee: Sivakorn Pu-udom (Thailand)

11 June 2026 FIFA WCQ & 2027 ACQ R2	Qatar	2–1	India	Al Rayyan, Qatar
18:45 UTC+3	Ayman 73'; Al-Rawi 85'	Report	Chhangte 37'	Stadium: Jassim bin Hamad Stadium; Attendance: 2,816; Referee: Kim Woo-sung (South Korea)

5 September 2026 World Cup qualification	Qatar	1–3	United Arab Emirates	Al Rayyan, Qatar
19:00 UTC+3	Al-Hassan 38'	Report	Abdalla 68'; Ibrahim 80'; Saleh 90+4'	Stadium: Ahmad bin Ali Stadium; Attendance: 33,952; Referee: Shaun Evans (Australia)

10 September 2026 World Cup qualification	North Korea	2–2	Qatar	Vientiane, Laos (Note: North Korea chose Vientiane, Laos as their home site for their match against Qatar, Iran and Uzbekistan due to "security concerns".)
19:00 UTC+7	Ri Il-song 19'; Kang Kuk-chol 52'	Report	Afif 31' (pen.); Ali 44'	Stadium: New Laos National Stadium; Attendance: 140; Referee: Nazmi Nasaruddin (Malaysia)

10 October 2026 World Cup qualification	Qatar	3–1	Kyrgyzstan	Doha, Qatar
19:00 UTC+3	Ali 39'; Kozubaev 63' (o.g.); Al-Hassan 81'	Report	Shukurov 76'	Stadium: Al Thumama Stadium; Attendance: 25,195; Referee: Muhammad Taqi (Singapore)

15 October 2026 World Cup qualification	Iran	4–1	Qatar	Dubai, United Arab Emirates (Note: The AFC has moved the match to a neutral venue due to security concerns relating to the 2024 Iran–Israel conflict.)
19:30 UTC+3:30	Azmoun 42', 48'; Mohebi 65', 90+8'	Report	Ali 17'	Stadium: Rashid Stadium; Attendance: 7,890; Referee: Yusuke Araki (Japan)

14 November 2026 World Cup qualification	Qatar	3–2	Uzbekistan	Doha, Qatar
19:15 UTC+3	Ali 25', 41'; Mendes 90+12'	Report	Fayzullaev 75', 80'	Stadium: Jassim bin Hamad Stadium; Attendance: 10,759; Referee: Kim Jong-hyeok (South Korea)

19 November 2026 World Cup qualification	United Arab Emirates	5–0	Qatar	Abu Dhabi, United Arab Emirates
20:00 UTC+4	Fábio Lima 4', 45' (pen.), 45+5', 56' (pen.); Al-Ghassani 73'	Report		Stadium: Al Nahyan Stadium; Attendance: 13,825; Referee: Khalid Saleh Al-Turais (Saudi Arabia)

21 December 26th Arabian Gulf Cup GS	Qatar	1–1	United Arab Emirates	Kuwait City, Kuwait
22:30 UTC+3	Afif 17' (pen.)	Report	Al-Ghassani 45+1'	Stadium: Sulaibikhat Stadium; Attendance: 5,007; Referee: István Kovács (Romania)

24 December 26th Arabian Gulf Cup GS	Oman	2–1	Qatar	Kuwait City, Kuwait
17:25 UTC+3	Al-Sabhi 20' (pen.), 52'	Report	Ali 2'	Stadium: Sulaibikhat Stadium; Attendance: 4,552; Referee: Mohanad Qasim Sarray (Iraq)

27 December 26th Arabian Gulf Cup GS	Kuwait	1–1	Qatar	Kuwait City, Kuwait
17:30 UTC+3	Daham 74'	Report	Muntari 90+11'	Stadium: Jaber Al-Ahmad International Stadium; Attendance: 57,742; Referee: Mustapha Ghorbal (Algeria)

=== 2025 ===
20 March 2026 World Cup qualification	Qatar	5–1	North Korea	Doha, Qatar
21:15 UTC+3	Afif 17'; Al Ganehi 23'; Yu-Song Kim 34' (o.g.); Al-Rawi 56'; Alaaeldin 66'	Report	Pak Kwang-hun 86'	Stadium: Jassim bin Hamad Stadium; Referee: Mohanad Qasim Sarray (Iraq)

25 March 2026 World Cup qualification	Kyrgyzstan	3–1	Qatar	Bishkek, Kyrgyzstan
19:45 UTC+6	Kichin 45+1'; Mishchenko 82'; Shukurov 90+3'	Report	Mendes 52'	Stadium: Dolen Omurzakov Stadium; Referee: Nazmi Nasaruddin (Malaysia)

5 June 2026 World Cup qualification	Qatar	1–0	Iran	Doha, Qatar
21:15 UTC+3	Pedro Miguel 41'	Report		Stadium: Jassim bin Hamad Stadium; Attendance: 8,925; Referee: Mohammed Al-Hoaish (Saudi Arabia)

10 June 2026 World Cup qualification	Uzbekistan	3–0	Qatar	Tashkent, Uzbekistan
18:45 UTC+5	Turgunboev 28'; Shomurodov 86'; Sergeev 90+2'	Report		Stadium: Milliy Stadium; Attendance: 32,931; Referee: Ma Ning (China)

24 August Unofficial friendly	Qatar	0–1	Lebanon	Al Rayyan, Qatar
18:30 UTC+3		Report; LFA report	Kaddour 6'	Stadium: Khalifa International Stadium; Attendance: 0
Note: The match was not considered an official international fixture, as it was played in two 35-minute halves (70 minutes in total).

3 September Unofficial friendly	Qatar	2–2	Bahrain	Doha, Qatar
19:15 UTC+3	Muntari 17'; Alaaeldin 87'		Al-Aswad 62' (pen.); Al-Khattal 66'	Stadium: Al Thumama Stadium

7 September Friendly	Qatar	1–4	Russia	Al Rayyan, Qatar
18:15 UTC+3	Afif 62'	Report	Golovin 33'; Kislyak 35'; Sergeyev 45'; Al. Miranchuk 69'	Stadium: Jassim bin Hamad Stadium; Attendance: 8,953; Referee: Yousif Saeed Hasan (Iraq)

8 October 2026 World Cup qualification	Oman	0–0	Qatar	Al Rayyan, Qatar
18:00 UTC+3		Report (FIFA); Report (AFC)		Stadium: Jassim bin Hamad Stadium; Attendance: 12,975; Referee: Yusuke Araki (Japan)

14 October 2026 World Cup qualification	Qatar	2–1	United Arab Emirates	Al Rayyan, Qatar
20:00 UTC+3	Khoukhi 49'; Pedro 74'	Report (FIFA); Report (AFC)	Adil 90+8'	Stadium: Jassim bin Hamad Stadium; Attendance: 13,038; Referee: Ilgiz Tantashev (Uzbekistan)

17 November Unofficial friendly	Qatar	1–2	Zimbabwe	Doha, Qatar
19:30 UTC+3	Gouda 9'	Report	Garananga 24'; Antonio 74'	Stadium: Abdullah bin Khalifa Stadium; Referee: Mohamed Ebrahim Saad (Bahrain)

1 December 2025 FIFA Arab Cup	Qatar	0–1	Palestine	Al Khor, Qatar
18:45 UTC+3		Report	Al-Brake 90+5' (o.g.)	Stadium: Al Bayt Stadium; Attendance: 61,475; Referee: Glenn Nyberg (Sweden)

4 December 2025 FIFA Arab Cup	Syria	1–1	Qatar	Al Rayyan, Qatar
20:00 UTC+3	Khribin 90'	Report	Alaaeldin 77'	Stadium: Khalifa International Stadium; Attendance: 42,467; Referee: Mario Escobar (Guatemala)

7 December 2025 FIFA Arab Cup	Qatar	0–3	Tunisia	Al Khor, Qatar
20:00 UTC+3		Report	Ben Romdhane 16'; Meriah 62'; Ben Ali 90+4'	Stadium: Al Bayt Stadium; Attendance: 48,151; Referee: Espen Eskås (Norway)

=== 2026 ===
26 March Friendly	Qatar	Cancelled	Serbia	Al Rayyan, Qatar
17:00 UTC+3		Report		Stadium: Jassim bin Hamad Stadium
Note: Cancelled due to the 2026 Iran war.

31 March Friendly	Qatar	Cancelled	Argentina	Lusail, Qatar
19:00 UTC+3				Stadium: Lusail Stadium
Note: Cancelled due to the 2026 Iran war.

21 May Friendly	Qatar	Cancelled	Sudan	Doha, Qatar
18:30 UTC+3		Report		Stadium: Abdullah bin Khalifa Stadium
Note: Cancelled as several players in the Sudan team contracted jaundice upon their arrival in Qatar.

28 May Friendly	Republic of Ireland	1–0	Qatar	Dublin, Ireland
19:45 UTC+1	Collins 5'	Report		Stadium: Aviva Stadium; Attendance: 28,981; Referee: Jamie Robinson (Northern Ireland)

6 June Friendly	El Salvador	0–0	Qatar	Los Angeles, United States
13:00 UTC−7		Report		Stadium: BMO Stadium; Referee: Rubiel Vazquez (United States)

13 June 2026 FIFA World Cup GS	Qatar	1–1	Switzerland	Santa Clara, United States
12:00 UTC−7	Muheim 90+4' (o.g.)	Report	Embolo 17' (pen.)	Stadium: Levi's Stadium; Attendance: 67,966; Referee: Saíd Martínez (Honduras)

18 June 2026 FIFA World Cup GS	Canada	6–0	Qatar	Vancouver, Canada
15:00 UTC−7	Larin 16'; David 29', 45+3', 90+2'; Saliba 64'; Manai 75' (o.g.)	Report		Stadium: BC Place; Attendance: 52,497; Referee: Cristián Garay (Chile)

24 June 2026 FIFA World Cup GS	Bosnia and Herzegovina	3–1	Qatar	Seattle, United States
12:00 UTC−7	Alajbegović 29'; Abunada 34' (o.g.); Mahmić 80'	Report	Al-Haydos 42'	Stadium: Lumen Field; Attendance: 66,925; Referee: Jesús Valenzuela (Venezuela)

24 September 2026 Gulf Cup GS	Qatar	2–0	Bahrain	Jeddah, Saudi Arabia
21:00 UTC+3	Khoukhi 61'; Al-Haydos 90+9' (pen.)	Report		Stadium: Prince Abdullah Al-Faisal Sports City Stadium; Attendance: 1,918; Referee: Khalid Al-Turais (Saudi Arabia)

27 September 2026 Gulf Cup GS	Yemen	0–1	Qatar	Jeddah, Saudi Arabia
18:55 UTC+3		Report	Abdurisag 64'	Stadium: King Abdullah Sports City Stadium; Attendance: 8,398; Referee: Adham Makhadmeh (Jordan)

30 September 2026 Gulf Cup GS	United Arab Emirates	1–1	Qatar	Jeddah, Saudi Arabia
20:30 UTC+3	Saleh 45+4'	Report	Ali 33'	Stadium: King Abdullah Sports City Stadium; Referee: Jalal Jayed (Morocco)

3 October 2026 Gulf Cup SF	Saudi Arabia	0–0 (a.e.t.) (3–2 p)	Qatar	Jeddah, Saudi Arabia
18:00 UTC+3		Report		Stadium: King Abdullah Sports City Stadium; Attendance: 51,342; Referee: João Pinheiro (Portugal)
	Penalties
	Al-Hamdan (penalty scored); Kanno (penalty scored); Al-Tambakti (penalty missed); Al-Buraikan (penalty missed); Ali (penalty scored)		(penalty missed) A. Ali; (penalty scored) Edmilson; (penalty missed) Gaber; (penalty missed) Khoukhi; (penalty scored) Al-Ganehi

== Forthcoming fixtures ==
The following matches are scheduled:

=== 2026 ===
November 2026 WAFF Championship	Qatar	v	Oman
--:--

November 2026 WAFF Championship	Qatar	v	Oman
--:--

=== 2027 ===
11 January 2027 Asian Cup GS	Qatar	v	Thailand	Riyadh, Saudi Arabia
--:--				Stadium: Imam Mohammed Ibn Saud University Stadium

16 January 2027 Asian Cup GS	Indonesia	v	Qatar	Al Khobar, Saudi Arabia
--:--				Stadium: Aramco Stadium

20 January 2027 Asian Cup GS	Japan	v	Qatar	Riyadh, Saudi Arabia
--:--				Stadium: Imam Mohammed Ibn Saud University Stadium

== Head to head records ==
As of match played 3 October 2026

Head to head records
Opponent	P	W	D	L	GF	GA	GD	W%
Afghanistan	9	7	2	0	29	1	+28	77.78
Albania	3	1	0	2	3	5	−2	33.33
Algeria	6	1	1	4	3	10	−7	16.67
Andorra	1	1	0	0	1	0	+1	100.00
Argentina	2	0	0	2	0	5	−5	0.00
Australia	5	1	1	3	2	10	−8	20.00
Azerbaijan	4	1	2	1	6	6	+0	25.00
Bahrain	42	9	20	13	38	40	−2	21.43
Bangladesh	7	5	2	0	18	3	+15	71.43
Belgium	1	0	0	1	0	2	−2	0.00
Bhutan	2	2	0	0	18	0	+18	100.00
Bosnia and Herzegovina	3	1	1	1	4	4	+0	33.33
Brazil	2	0	0	2	1	8	−7	0.00
Bulgaria	2	1	0	1	4	4	+0	50.00
Burkina Faso	1	0	1	0	2	2	+0	0.00
Cambodia	1	1	0	0	3	0	+3	100.00
Canada	2	0	0	2	0	8	−8	0.00
Chile	1	0	1	0	2	2	+0	0.00
China	20	7	5	8	17	23	−6	35.00
Colombia	1	0	0	1	0	1	−1	0.00
Costa Rica	1	0	1	0	1	1	+0	0.00
Croatia	1	0	0	1	2	3	−1	0.00
Curaçao	1	0	0	1	1	2	−1	0.00
Czech Republic	1	0	0	1	0	1	−1	0.00
Denmark	1	0	0	1	0	1	−1	0.00
DR Congo	1	0	1	0	2	2	+0	0.00
Ecuador	4	1	1	2	6	8	−2	25.00
El Salvador	3	2	1	0	4	2	+2	66.67
Egypt	8	2	2	4	7	18	−11	25.00
Estonia	2	2	0	0	5	0	+5	100.00
Finland	4	1	3	0	4	3	+1	25.00
Georgia	1	0	0	1	1	2	−1	0.00
Ghana	2	1	0	1	3	6	−3	50.00
Greece	1	0	0	1	0	1	−1	0.00
Grenada	1	1	0	0	4	0	+4	100.00
Guatemala	1	1	0	0	2	0	+2	100.00
Haiti	2	0	0	2	1	3	−2	0.00
Honduras	3	2	1	0	4	1	+3	66.67
Hong Kong	7	7	0	0	16	2	+14	100.00
Hungary	3	0	1	2	2	8	−6	0.00
Iceland	2	0	2	0	3	3	+0	0.00
India	5	4	1	0	12	1	+11	80.00
Indonesia	9	6	2	1	23	10	+13	66.67
Iran	26	5	5	16	20	45	−25	19.23
Iraq	34	9	10	15	34	41	−7	26.47
Ivory Coast	1	0	0	1	1	6	−5	0.00
Jamaica	2	1	1	0	3	2	+1	50.00
Japan	10	3	4	3	13	12	+1	30.00
Jordan	24	13	5	6	35	19	+16	54.17
Kazakhstan	4	2	0	2	6	4	+2	50.00
Kenya	1	0	0	1	1	2	−1	0.00
North Korea	14	4	6	4	26	18	+8	28.57
South Korea	12	4	2	6	15	20	−5	33.33
Kuwait	39	14	4	21	46	59	−13	35.90
Kyrgyzstan	4	2	1	1	5	4	+1	50.00
Laos	2	2	0	0	11	1	+10	100.00
Latvia	1	1	0	0	3	1	+2	100.00
Lebanon	15	11	3	1	37	4	+33	73.33
Libya	4	2	1	1	4	2	+2	50.00
Liechtenstein	1	0	0	1	1	2	−1	0.00
Luxembourg	2	1	1	0	2	1	+1	50.00
North Macedonia	3	1	1	1	2	2	+0	33.33
Malaysia	7	4	3	0	11	3	+8	57.14
Maldives	3	3	0	0	9	0	+9	100.00
Mali	1	0	1	0	0	0	+0	0.00
Malta	2	0	0	2	0	4	−4	0.00
Mauritius	1	1	0	0	3	0	+3	100.00
Mexico	1	1	0	0	1	0	+1	100.00
Moldova	1	0	1	0	1	1	+0	0.00
Morocco	3	0	2	1	2	3	−1	0.00
Myanmar	1	0	1	0	2	2	+0	0.00
Netherlands	1	0	0	1	0	2	−2	0.00
New Zealand	1	1	0	0	3	2	+1	100.00
Nicaragua	1	1	0	0	2	1	+1	100.00
Northern Ireland	1	0	1	0	1	1	+0	0.00
Norway	1	0	0	1	1	6	−5	0.00
Oman	36	20	9	7	62	30	+32	55.56
Pakistan	1	1	0	0	5	0	+5	100.00
Palestine	13	8	2	3	15	9	+6	61.54
Panama	3	1	1	1	5	8	−3	33.33
Paraguay	4	1	2	1	5	6	−1	25.00
Peru	1	0	0	1	0	2	−2	0.00
Philippines	1	1	0	0	5	0	+5	100.00
Portugal	2	0	0	2	1	6	−5	0.00
Republic of Ireland	3	0	1	2	1	6	−5	0.00
Romania	3	1	0	2	7	8	−1	33.33
Russia	5	1	2	2	7	12	−5	20.00
Saudi Arabia	41	7	16	18	30	54	−24	17.07
Scotland	1	0	0	1	0	1	−1	0.00
Senegal	1	0	0	1	1	3	−2	0.00
Serbia	3	1	0	2	3	8	−5	33.33
Singapore	14	12	1	1	32	5	+27	85.71
Slovenia	3	1	1	1	2	4	−2	33.33
Sri Lanka	3	3	0	0	9	0	+9	100.00
Sudan	4	3	1	0	9	2	+7	75.00
Sweden	2	0	1	1	2	3	−1	0.00
Switzerland	3	1	2	0	3	2	+1	33.33
Syria	13	5	4	4	19	19	+0	38.46
Tajikistan	5	4	0	1	11	3	+8	80.00
Thailand	14	6	4	4	18	16	+2	42.86
Tunisia	1	1	0	0	1	0	+1	100.00
Turkey	1	0	0	1	1	2	−1	0.00
Turkmenistan	3	3	0	0	8	1	+7	100.00
United Arab Emirates	37	15	11	11	51	44	+7	40.54
United States	1	0	0	1	0	1	−1	0.00
Uzbekistan	17	4	3	10	17	30	−13	23.53
Vietnam	6	3	1	2	14	5	+9	50.00
Wales	1	0	0	1	0	1	−1	0.00
Yemen	10	9	1	0	27	3	+24	90.00
Zimbabwe	2	0	0	2	1	4	−3	0.00
Total	660	267	167	226	928	799	+129	40.45
