= Solak =

Solak may refer to:

== People ==
- Aleja Solak (born 1944), Bosnian footballer
- Dragan Šolak (businessman) (born 1964), Serbian businessman
- Dragan Šolak (chess player) (born 1980), Turkish-Serbian chess grandmaster
- Fatih Solak (born 1980), Turkish basketball player
- Ketlen A. Solak, Haitian-American prelate of the Episcopal Church
- Nataša Tapušković (born 1975), née Šolak, Serbian actress
- Nick Solak (born 1995), American baseball player
- Tarık Solak (born 1964), Turkish-Australian kickboxing promoter

== Places ==
- Solak, Armenia, a village
- Solak, Bangladesh, a village
- Solak, Aksu, Turkey, a neighborhood of Aksu

== See also ==
- the subject of the painting Solaks, the Janissary archer bodyguard of the Sultan by Lambert de Vos
- Asociacion SOLAC, a Peruvian non-profit organization
- Solac, the dam of Double Trigger, a Thoroughbred racehorse
- Soulac-sur-Mer, France, a commune commonly known as Soulac
