= Kurşunlu (disambiguation) =

Kurşunlu is a town and district of Çankırı Province, Turkey

Kurşunlu may also refer to:

== People ==
- Ramazan Kurşunlu (born 1981), Turkish footballer

== Places ==
- Kurşunlu, Antalya, a village in Antalya Province, turkey
- Kurşunlu, Bayramiç
- Kurşunlu, Gemlik, a coastal neighbourhood in Gemlik district of Bursa province, Turkey
- Kurşunlu, İnegöl, a neighbourhood in İnegöl district of Bursa province, Turkey
- Kurşunlu, Karacabey, a coastal neighbourhood in Karacabey district of Bursa province, Turkey
- Kurşunlu, Çanakkale
- Kurşunlu, Gölpazarı, a village in Gölpazarı district of Bilecik Province, Turkey
- Kurşunlu, Mustafakemalpaşa
- Kurşunlu Waterfall Nature Park, a waterfall in Antalya province, Turkey

== Other uses ==
- 1951 Kurşunlu earthquake, an earthquake occurred in Kurşunlu, Çankırı Province, Turkey
- Kuršumli An, an Ottoman caravanserai in Skopje, Macedonia
- Kurşunlu Mosque and Complex, a 16th-century mosque in Eskişehir, Turkey
