= Alaylı =

Alaylı can refer to:

- Alaylı, Antalya
- Alaylı, Yenişehir
