= Morka =

Inland town of ancient Pamphylia

Coordinates: 37°06′52″N 30°47′43″E

Morka was an inland town of ancient Pamphylia inhabited during Byzantine times.

Its site is tentatively located near Yeşilkaraman, in Asiatic Turkey.
