= 2023 CONCACAF Gold Cup Group B =

Football competition

Group B of the 2023 CONCACAF Gold Cup took place from June 25 to July 2, 2023. The group consisted of Mexico, Haiti, Honduras and invited guests Qatar. The top two teams, Mexico and Qatar, advanced to the quarter-finals, while the other two teams were eliminated.

== Standings ==
Pos	Team	Pld	W	D	L	GF	GA	GD	Pts	Qualification
1	Mexico	3	2	0	1	7	2	+5	6	Advance to knockout stage
2	Qatar	3	1	1	1	3	3	0	4	Advance to knockout stage
3	Honduras	3	1	1	1	3	6	−3	4	
4	Haiti	3	1	0	2	4	6	−2	3	

Source: CONCACAF
Rules for classification: Tiebreakers

In the quarter-finals:

- The winners of Group B, Mexico, advanced to play the runners-up of Group C.
- The runners-up of Group B, Qatar, advanced to play the winners of Group C.

== Matches ==
=== Haiti vs Qatar ===
The two teams had met previously only once, a friendly in 2010, won by Haiti 1–0.

June 25, 2023
18:00 (17:00 UTC-5)

Haiti	2–1	Qatar
Nazon 45+1' (pen.); Pierrot 90+7'	Report	Abdurisag 20'

NRG Stadium, Houston
Attendance: 66,255
Referee: Daneon Parchment (Jamaica)

Haiti	Qatar

GK	1	Alexandre Pierre
RB	2	Carlens Arcus
CB	4	Ricardo Adé (c)
CB	6	Garven Metusala
LB	22	Alex Christian	(yellow card) 89'
CM	18	Carl Fred Sainté	(yellow card) 48'	(substituted off) 90+2'
CM	21	Bryan Alceus		(substituted off) 75'
RW	14	Fafà Picault	(yellow card) 22'	(substituted off) 84'
AM	11	Derrick Etienne		(substituted off) 90+2'
LW	9	Duckens Nazon
CF	20	Frantzdy Pierrot
Substitutions:
MF	19	Steeven Saba		(substituted on) 75'
FW	13	Jayro Jean		(substituted on) 84'
MF	17	Danley Jean Jacques		(substituted on) 90+2'
FW	7	Carnejy Antoine		(substituted on) 90+2'
Manager:
(Spain) Gabriel Calderón

GK	22	Meshaal Barsham
RB	15	Bassam Al-Rawi	(yellow card) 46'
CB	2	Ahmed Suhail
CB	5	Tarek Salman	(yellow card) 3'
LB	14	Homam Ahmed
DM	6	Ahmed Fatehi (c)
RM	11	Yusuf Abdurisag		(substituted off) 90+8'
CM	20	Jassem Gaber		(substituted off) 58'
CM	16	Mostafa Meshaal
LM	3	Hazem Shehata		(substituted off) 58'
CF	9	Mohammed Muntari		(substituted off) 87'
Substitutions:
MF	8	Ali Assadalla		(substituted on) 58'
FW	17	Tameem Al-Abdullah	(yellow card) 69'	(substituted on) 58'
MF	10	Mohammed Waad		(substituted on) 87'
DF	4	Yousef Ayman		(substituted on) 90+8'
Manager:
(Portugal) Carlos Queiroz

Man of the Match:
Duckens Nazon (Haiti)

Assistant referees:
Caleb Wales (Trinidad and Tobago)
Ojay Duhaney (Jamaica)
Fourth official:
Reon Radix (Grenada)
Video assistant referee:
Ricardo Montero (Costa Rica)
Assistant video assistant referee:
Benjamín Pineda (Costa Rica)

=== Mexico vs Honduras ===
The two teams had met seven times at the Gold Cup, including the 2011 semi-final match won by Mexico 2–0 after extra time.

June 25, 2023
20:00 (19:00 UTC-5)

Mexico	4–0	Honduras
Romo 1', 23'; Pineda 52'; Chávez 64'	Report

NRG Stadium, Houston
Attendance: 66,255
Referee: Mario Escobar (Guatemala)

Mexico	Honduras

GK	13	Guillermo Ochoa (c)
RB	19	Jorge Sánchez	(yellow card) 29'
CB	4	Edson Álvarez		(substituted off) 80'
CB	5	Johan Vásquez
LB	23	Jesús Gallardo
CM	14	Érick Sánchez		(substituted off) 69'
CM	7	Luis Romo
CM	18	Luis Chávez
RF	15	Uriel Antuna	(yellow card) 33'	(substituted off) 69'
CF	20	Henry Martín		(substituted off) 59'
LF	17	Orbelín Pineda		(substituted off) 80'
Substitutions:
FW	11	Santiago Giménez		(substituted on) 59'
MF	8	Carlos Rodríguez		(substituted on) 69'
FW	9	Ozziel Herrera		(substituted on) 69'
DF	21	Israel Reyes		(substituted on) 80'
FW	10	Roberto Alvarado		(substituted on) 80'
Interim manager:
Jaime Lozano

GK	22	Luis López
RB	4	Marcelo Santos
CB	2	Devron García
CB	15	Luis Vega	(yellow card) 20'
LB	8	Joseph Rosales
CM	20	Deiby Flores
CM	14	Jorge Álvarez		(substituted off) 69'
RW	7	Alberth Elis (c)	(yellow card) 32'	(substituted off) 76'
AM	10	Alexander López		(substituted off) 59'
LW	17	José Pinto		(substituted off) 59'
CF	12	Jorge Benguché		(substituted off) 59'
Substitutions:
DF	19	Omar Elvir		(substituted on) 59'
MF	21	Alexy Vega		(substituted on) 59'
FW	11	Jerry Bengtson		(substituted on) 59'
MF	6	Bryan Acosta		(substituted on) 69'
FW	9	Rubilio Castillo		(substituted on) 76'
Manager:
(Argentina) Diego Vásquez

Man of the Match:
Luis Romo (Mexico)

Assistant referees:
Luis Ventura (Guatemala)
Humberto Panjoj (Guatemala)
Fourth official:
Bryan López (Guatemala)
Video assistant referee:
Tim Ford (United States)
Assistant video assistant referee:
Allen Chapman (United States)

=== Qatar vs Honduras ===
The two teams had met previously only once, a group stage match in the previous edition of the tournament in 2021, which ended in a 2–0 victory for Qatar.

June 29, 2023
19:45 (16:45 UTC-7)

Qatar	1–1	Honduras
Al-Abdullah 7'	Report	Elis 90+6'

State Farm Stadium, Glendale
Attendance: 34,517
Referee: Armando Villarreal (United States)

Qatar	Honduras

GK	22	Meshaal Barsham	(yellow card) 82'
RB	15	Bassam Al-Rawi	(yellow card) 52'
CB	2	Ahmed Suhail
CB	5	Tarek Salman
LB	14	Homam Ahmed
DM	6	Ahmed Fatehi (c)	(yellow card) 50'
RM	11	Yusuf Abdurisag	(red card) 90+8'	(substituted off) 79'
CM	8	Ali Assadalla		(substituted off) 74'
CM	16	Mostafa Meshaal		(substituted off) 90'
LM	10	Mohammed Waad	(yellow card) 20'	(substituted off) 79'
CF	17	Tameem Al-Abdullah		(substituted off) 74'
Substitutions:
DF	3	Hazem Shehata		(substituted on) 74'
FW	9	Mohammed Muntari		(substituted on) 74'
DF	13	Musab Kheder		(substituted on) 79'
DF	20	Jassem Gaber		(substituted on) 79'
MF	23	Assim Madibo		(substituted on) 90'
Manager:
(Portugal) Carlos Queiroz

GK	1	Edrick Menjívar
RB	13	Maylor Núñez
CB	4	Marcelo Santos
CB	15	Luis Vega		(substituted off) 24'
LB	19	Omar Elvir
CM	6	Bryan Acosta		(substituted off) 55'
CM	20	Deiby Flores
CM	8	Joseph Rosales	(yellow card) 45+1'	(substituted off) 72'
AM	10	Alexander López		(substituted off) 46'
CF	7	Alberth Elis (c)
CF	11	Jerry Bengtson		(substituted off) 73'
Substitutions:
DF	2	Devron García		(substituted on) 24'
FW	9	Rubilio Castillo	(red card) 90+8'	(substituted on) 46'
MF	14	Jorge Álvarez	(yellow card) 56'	(substituted on) 55'
FW	16	Edwin Solano		(substituted on) 72'
MF	17	José Pinto		(substituted on) 73'
Manager:
(Argentina) Diego Vásquez

Man of the Match:
Alberth Elis (Honduras)

Assistant referees:
Cory Richardson (United States)
Logan Brown (United States)
Fourth official:
Joe Dickerson (United States)
Video assistant referee:
Allen Chapman (United States)
Assistant video assistant referee:
Tim Ford (United States)

=== Haiti vs Mexico ===
The two teams had met ten times previously, including twice in the Gold Cup with both matches ending in victories for Mexico; 4–0 in the quarter-finals in 2009 and 1–0 in the semi-finals (after extra time) in 2019.

June 29, 2023
22:00 (19:00 UTC-7)

Haiti	1–3	Mexico
Jean Jacques 78'	Report	Martín 46'; Adé 56' (o.g.); Giménez 83'

State Farm Stadium, Glendale
Attendance: 34,517
Referee: Walter López (Guatemala)

Haiti	Mexico

GK	1	Alexandre Pierre
RB	2	Carlens Arcus
CB	4	Ricardo Adé (c)
CB	6	Garven Metusala
LB	22	Alex Christian
RM	14	Fafà Picault		(substituted off) 58'
CM	17	Danley Jean Jacques
CM	18	Carl Fred Sainté		(substituted off) 86'
LM	10	Wilde-Donald Guerrier		(substituted off) 58'
CF	20	Frantzdy Pierrot	(yellow card) 17'	(substituted off) 86'
CF	9	Duckens Nazon		(substituted off) 71'
Substitutions:
FW	7	Carnejy Antoine		(substituted on) 58'
FW	13	Jayro Jean		(substituted on) 58'
FW	11	Derrick Etienne		(substituted on) 71'
MF	8	Leverton Pierre		(substituted on) 86'
FW	16	Mondy Prunier		(substituted on) 86'
Manager:
(Spain) Gabriel Calderón

GK	13	Guillermo Ochoa (c)
RB	19	Jorge Sánchez	(yellow card) 18'	(substituted off) 62'
CB	4	Edson Álvarez
CB	5	Johan Vásquez
LB	23	Jesús Gallardo
CM	14	Érick Sánchez		(substituted off) 71'
CM	7	Luis Romo
CM	18	Luis Chávez		(substituted off) 78'
RF	15	Uriel Antuna
CF	20	Henry Martín		(substituted off) 62'
LF	17	Orbelín Pineda		(substituted off) 71'
Substitutions:
DF	2	Julián Araujo		(substituted on) 62'
FW	11	Santiago Giménez		(substituted on) 62'
MF	8	Carlos Rodríguez		(substituted on) 71'
FW	10	Roberto Alvarado		(substituted on) 71'
DF	21	Israel Reyes		(substituted on) 78'
Interim manager:
Jaime Lozano

Man of the Match:
Uriel Antuna (Mexico)

Assistant referees:
Keytzel Corrales (Nicaragua)
Raymundo Feliz (Dominican Republic)
Fourth official:
Keylor Herrera (Costa Rica)
Video assistant referee:
Chris Penso (United States)
Assistant video assistant referee:
Edvin Jurisevic (United States)

=== Honduras vs Haiti ===
The two teams had faced each other 17 times previously, including three Gold Cup group stage matches: Honduras' 1–0 and 2–0 wins in 2009 and 2013, respectively, and a 1–0 victory for Haiti in 2015, which was also the most recent meeting between both sides.

July 2, 2023
21:00

Honduras	2–1	Haiti
Bengtson 42'; Pinto 59'	Report	Pierrot 20'

Bank of America Stadium, Charlotte
Attendance: 47,382
Referee: Oshane Nation (Jamaica)

Honduras	Haiti

GK	1	Edrick Menjívar
RB	13	Maylor Núñez
CB	2	Devron García
CB	4	Marcelo Santos
LB	19	Omar Elvir
RM	8	Joseph Rosales		(substituted off) 88'
CM	20	Deiby Flores (c)
CM	14	Jorge Álvarez
LM	17	José Pinto		(substituted off) 81'
CF	12	Jorge Benguché	(yellow card) 90+6'
CF	11	Jerry Bengtson		(substituted off) 71'
Substitutions:
MF	6	Bryan Acosta		(substituted on) 71'
MF	5	Christian Altamirano		(substituted on) 81'
MF	10	Alexander López		(substituted on) 88'
Manager:
(Argentina) Diego Vásquez

GK	1	Alexandre Pierre
RB	2	Carlens Arcus
CB	4	Ricardo Adé (c)
CB	6	Garven Metusala		(substituted off) 90'
LB	22	Alex Christian		(substituted off) 83'
CM	17	Danley Jean Jacques		(substituted off) 71'
CM	18	Carl Fred Sainté		(substituted off) 46'
RW	7	Carnejy Antoine		(substituted off) 46'
AM	11	Derrick Etienne
LW	9	Duckens Nazon
CF	20	Frantzdy Pierrot
Substitutions:
MF	21	Bryan Alceus	(yellow card) 90+7'	(substituted on) 46'
FW	13	Jayro Jean		(substituted on) 46'
FW	14	Fafà Picault		(substituted on) 71'
DF	10	Wilde-Donald Guerrier		(substituted on) 83'
FW	16	Mondy Prunier		(substituted on) 90'
Manager:
(Spain) Gabriel Calderón

Man of the Match:
José Pinto (Honduras)

Assistant referees:
Zachari Zeegelaar (Suriname)
Jassett Kerr-Wilson (Jamaica)
Fourth official:
Rubiel Vazquez (United States)
Video assistant referee:
Tim Ford (United States)
Assistant video assistant referee:
Allen Chapman (United States)

=== Mexico vs Qatar ===
The two teams had never met before. It was the first time since 2005 in which Mexico was defeated by a guest nation. Mexico had previously recorded losses to South Korea in 2002 and to both South Africa and Colombia in 2005.

July 2, 2023
21:00 (18:00 UTC-7)

Mexico	0–1	Qatar
	Report	Shehata 27'

Levi's Stadium, Santa Clara
Attendance: 60,347
Referee: Drew Fischer (Canada)

Mexico	Qatar

GK	13	Guillermo Ochoa (c)
RB	2	Julián Araujo		(substituted off) 81'
CB	4	Edson Álvarez
CB	21	Israel Reyes
LB	6	Gerardo Arteaga	(yellow card) 74'
CM	8	Carlos Rodríguez		(substituted off) 70'
CM	7	Luis Romo		(substituted off) 81'
CM	18	Luis Chávez
RF	9	Ozziel Herrera		(substituted off) 60'
CF	11	Santiago Giménez	(yellow card) 67'
LF	17	Orbelín Pineda		(substituted off) 60'
Substitutions:
MF	16	Diego Lainez		(substituted on) 60'
FW	10	Roberto Alvarado		(substituted on) 60'
FW	20	Henry Martín		(substituted on) 70'
FW	15	Uriel Antuna		(substituted on) 81'
FW	14	Érick Sánchez		(substituted on) 81'
Interim manager:
Jaime Lozano

GK	22	Meshaal Barsham	(yellow card) 87'
RB	13	Musab Kheder
CB	2	Ahmed Suhail
CB	5	Tarek Salman	(yellow card) 45+4'
LB	14	Homam Ahmed
DM	6	Ahmed Fatehi (c)	(yellow card) 45+3'
RM	12	Abdullah Marafee		(substituted off) 53'
CM	10	Mohammed Waad	(yellow card) 31'	(substituted off) 40'
CM	16	Mostafa Meshaal	(yellow card) 90'
LM	3	Hazem Shehata		(substituted off) 77'
CF	17	Tameem Al-Abdullah	(yellow card) 48'	(substituted off) 78'
Substitutions:
MF	8	Ali Assadalla		(substituted on) 40'
DF	4	Yousef Ayman		(substituted on) 53'
MF	7	Mahdi Salem	(yellow card) 81'	(substituted on) 77'
MF	23	Assim Madibo	(yellow card) 90+3'	(substituted on) 78'
Manager:
(Portugal) Carlos Queiroz

Man of the Match:
Hazem Shehata (Qatar)

Assistant referees:
Kathryn Nesbitt (United States)
Micheal Barwegen (Canada)
Fourth official:
Joe Dickerson (United States)
Video assistant referee:
Edvin Jurisevic (United States)
Assistant video assistant referee:
Chris Penso (United States)
