= Gökdere =

Gökdere is a toponym of Turkic origin. In Turkish, Gökdere means roughly "Sky stream" or "Sky creek," while in Turkmen it translates to "Blue steam" or "Blue valley." It may refer to:

== Toponyms ==
=== Turkey ===
- Gökdere (Nilüfer River tributary), spanned by Irgandı Bridge, in Bursa Province, of northwestern Turkey

==== Villages ====
- Gökdere, Aksu, a village in the district of Aksu, Antalya Province, Turkey
- Gökdere, Amasya, a village in the central district of Amasya Province, Turkey
- Gökdere, Antalya, a village in the Antalya district of Antalya Province, Turkey
- Gökdere, Bingöl, a village in the Bingöl District, Bingöl Province, Turkey
- Gökdere, Çorum, a village in Çorum district of Çorum Province, Turkey
- Gökdere, İmranlı, a village in the İmranlı District of Sivas Province in Turkey
- Gökdere, Kalecik, a village in Kalecik district of Ankara Province, Turkey
- Gökdere, Osmancık, a village in Osmancık district of Çorum Province, Turkey
- Gökdere, Palu, a village in Palu district of Elazığ Province, Turkey
- Gökdere, Tercan, a village in the Tercan District, Erzincan Province, Turkey

=== Turkmenistan ===
- Gökdere, Turkmenistan, a village in Türkmenbaşy District, Balkan Province, Turkmenistan
