= 2023 CONCACAF Gold Cup =

17th edition of the CONCACAF Gold Cup

Copa Oro de la CONCACAF 2023 (Spanish)
- This Is Ours; Spanish: Esto Es Nuestro

Tournament details
- Host countries: Canada; United States
- Dates: June 24 – July 16
- Teams: 16 (from 2 confederations)
- Venues: 15 (in 14 host cities)

Final positions
- Champions: Mexico (9th title)
- Runners-up: Panama

Tournament statistics
- Matches played: 31
- Goals scored: 105 (3.39 per match)
- Attendance: 1,014,571 (32,728 per match)
- Top scorer(s): (United States) Jesús Ferreira (7 goals)
- Best player: (Panama) Adalberto Carrasquilla
- Best goalkeeper: (Mexico) Guillermo Ochoa
- Fair play award: United States

The 2023 CONCACAF Gold Cup was the 17th edition of the CONCACAF Gold Cup, the biennial international men's soccer championship of the North, Central American and Caribbean region organized by CONCACAF. Canada and the United States hosted the tournament, which began on June 24, 2023.

The United States were the defending champions, having won the 2021 edition, but were eliminated by Panama in the semi-finals.

Mexico won a record ninth Gold Cup title, defeating Panama 1–0 in the final on July 16 at SoFi Stadium in Inglewood, California, a suburb of Los Angeles.

== Venues ==
Location of the host cities of the 2023 CONCACAF Gold Cup.

CONCACAF announced the 15 host venues for the 2023 Gold Cup on April 10, 2023. They included a mix of soccer-specific stadiums primarily occupied by Major League Soccer teams and larger American football stadiums. BMO Field in Toronto was the sole venue outside of the United States; it was the first Canadian stadium to host the Gold Cup since the 2015 edition.

List of host cities and stadiums
| Arlington (Dallas/Fort Worth Area) | Charlotte |
|---|---|
| AT&T Stadium‡ | Bank of America Stadium |
| Capacity: 80,000 | Capacity: 74,867 |
Houston
| NRG Stadium‡ | Shell Energy Stadium |
| Capacity: 72,220 | Capacity: 22,039 |

| Inglewood (Los Angeles Area) | Santa Clara (San Francisco Bay Area) | Glendale (Phoenix Area) | Chicago |
|---|---|---|---|
| SoFi Stadium | Levi's Stadium | State Farm Stadium‡ | Soldier Field |
| Capacity: 70,240 | Capacity: 68,500 | Capacity: 63,400 | Capacity: 61,500 |
| Paradise (Las Vegas Area) | San Diego | Toronto | Cincinnati |
| Allegiant Stadium‡ | Snapdragon Stadium | BMO Field | TQL Stadium |
| Capacity: 61,000 | Capacity: 35,000 | Capacity: 30,991 | Capacity: 25,513 |
| Harrison (New York City Area) | St. Louis | Fort Lauderdale (Miami Area) | |
| Red Bull Arena | CityPark | DRV PNK Stadium | |
| Capacity: 25,000 | Capacity: 22,500 | Capacity: 18,000 | |

- A double-dagger (‡) denotes an indoor stadium with a fixed or retractable roof with interior climate control.

== Teams ==
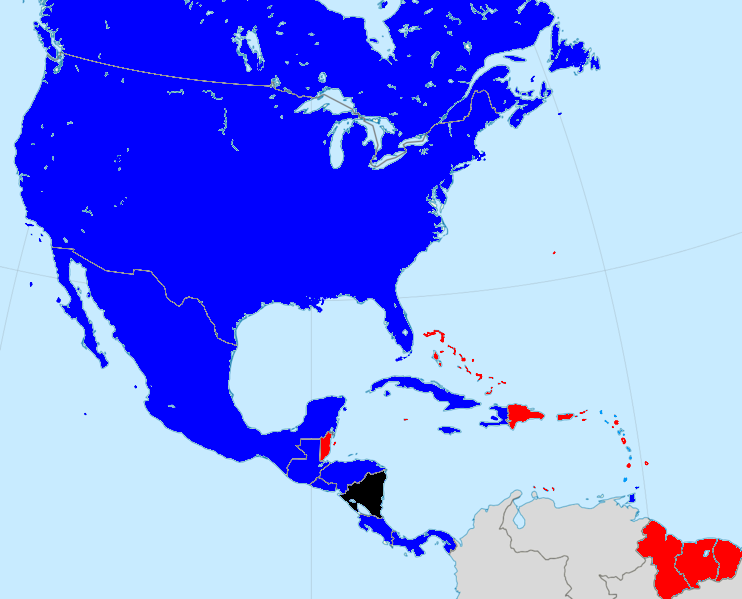
Team qualified for CONCACAF Gold Cup Team failed to qualify Team disqualified

=== Qualification ===
On September 2, 2020, CONCACAF announced that 2022 FIFA World Cup hosts Qatar would participate in the 2021 and 2023 tournaments. The remaining teams qualified through the 2022–23 CONCACAF Nations League and the 2023 CONCACAF Gold Cup qualification:

- The top eight teams in the Nations League A qualified for the Gold Cup, and the remaining four teams entered the qualifying tournament.
- The top four teams in the Nations League B qualified for the Gold Cup, and the next best four teams entered the qualifying tournament.
- The top four teams in the Nations League C entered the qualifying tournament.
- The top three teams in the qualifying tournament qualified for the Gold Cup.

| Team | Qualification | Date of qualification | Gold Cup appearances (+ CONCACAF Championship) | Last appearance | Previous best Gold Cup performance | FIFA | CONCACAF |
| Team | Qualification | Date of qualification | Gold Cup appearances (+ CONCACAF Championship) | Last appearance | Previous best Gold Cup performance | Rankings at start of event | |
|---|---|---|---|---|---|---|---|
| Qatar | Invited guest | September 2, 2020 | 2nd | 2021 | Semi-finals (2021) | 61 | N/A |
| Panama | CNL League A Group B winners | June 12, 2022 | 11th (12th) | 2021 | Runners-up (2005, 2013) | 58 | 5 |
| Jamaica | CNL League A Group A runners-up | June 14, 2022 | 13th (15th) | 2021 | Runners-up (2015, 2017) | 63 | 7 |
| El Salvador | CNL League A Group D runners-up | June 14, 2022 | 13th (19th) | 2021 | Quarter-finals (2002, 2003, 2011, 2013, 2017, 2021); Runners-up (1963, 1981) | 75 | 10 |
| Mexico | CNL League A Group A winners | March 23, 2023 | 17th (25th) | 2021 | Champions (1993, 1996, 1998, 2003, 2009, 2011, 2015, 2019); Champions (1965, 1971, 1977) | 15 | 1 |
| United States (title holders & co-host) | CNL League A Group D winners | March 24, 2023 | 17th (19th) | 2021 | Champions (1991, 2002, 2005, 2007, 2013, 2017, 2021); Runners-up (1989) | 13 | 2 |
| Haiti | CNL League B Group B winners | March 25, 2023 | 9th (16th) | 2021 | Semi-finals (2019); Champions (1973) | 87 | 6 |
| Costa Rica | CNL League A Group B runners-up | March 25, 2023 | 16th (22nd) | 2021 | Runners-up (2002); Champions (1963, 1969, 1989) | 39 | 3 |
| Canada (co-host) | CNL League A Group C winners | March 25, 2023 | 16th (19th) | 2021 | Champions (2000); Champions (1985) | 47 | 4 |
| Honduras | CNL League A Group C runners-up | March 25, 2023 | 16th (22nd) | 2021 | Runners-up (1991); Champions (1981) | 80 | 9 |
| Cuba | CNL League B Group A winners | March 26, 2023 | 10th (12th) | 2019 | Quarter-finals (2003, 2013, 2015); Fourth place (1971) | 165 | 13 |
| Guatemala | CNL League B Group D winners | March 27, 2023 | 12th (20th) | 2021 | Fourth place (1996); Champions (1967) | 116 | 8 |
| Trinidad and Tobago | CNL League B Group C runners-up (Note: Nicaragua originally qualified as winners of CONCACAF Nations League B Group C, but were disqualified for fielding an ineligible player. They were replaced by Trinidad and Tobago, who was the runners-up in Group C and with the best record among all runners-up in League B and who had originally qualified for the preliminary round.) | June 12, 2023 | 12th (18th) | 2021 | Semi-finals (2000); Runners-up (1973) | 104 | 11 |
| Guadeloupe | Gold Cup Prelims winners | June 20, 2023 | 5th | 2021 | Semi-finals (2007) | N/A | 19 |
| Martinique | Gold Cup Prelims winners | June 20, 2023 | 8th | 2021 | Quarter-finals (2002) | N/A | 12 |
| Saint Kitts and Nevis | Gold Cup Prelims winners | June 20, 2023 | 1st | N/A | Debut | 139 | 21 |

=== Squads ===
Before submitting their final squad for the tournament, teams named a provisional squad of up to 60 players. Teams were required to have their 60-player roster submitted to CONCACAF by May 25. Teams were required to name their final squads by June 14.

=== Draw ===
The final draw was held on April 14, 2023, at SoFi Stadium in Inglewood, California, completed alongside the draw for the preliminary round. The teams were split into four pots based on the CONCACAF Rankings of March 2023. The four teams of Pot 1 were automatically seeded, with the United States in Group A as the title holders, Mexico in Group B, Costa Rica in Group C, and Canada in Group D. Guests Qatar were placed in Pot 4 alongside the three winners of the preliminary round, whose identities were not known at the time of the draw, indicated by PM (Preliminary Match) and their corresponding Preliminary Match number. In the draw, teams were first selected from their pots, in order from Pot 1 to 4. Then, a ball was drawn from a separate group of pots (Pot 5 to 8) to determine final groupings.

Pot 1
| Team | Pts | Rank |
|---|---|---|
| Mexico (B1) | 1,939 | 1 |
| United States (A1) | 1,919 | 2 |
| Costa Rica (C1) | 1,796 | 3 |
| Canada (D1) | 1,743 | 4 |

Pot 2
| Team | Pts | Rank |
|---|---|---|
| Panama | 1,695 | 5 |
| Haiti | 1,482 | 6 |
| Jamaica | 1,479 | 7 |
| Guatemala | 1,405 | 8 |

Pot 3
| Team | Pts | Rank |
|---|---|---|
| Honduras | 1,403 | 9 |
| El Salvador | 1,330 | 10 |
| Cuba | 1,176 | 13 |
| Trinidad and Tobago | 1,067 | 17 |

Pot 4
| Team | Pts | Rank |
|---|---|---|
| Martinique (PM8) | 1,246 | 12 |
| Guadeloupe (PM7) | 966 | 19 |
| Saint Kitts and Nevis (PM9) | 923 | 21 |
| Qatar | N/A | |

== Match officials ==
On June 7, 2023, CONCACAF announced a total of 13 referees, 6 support referees, 26 assistant referees and 15 video assistant referees (VAR) appointed for the tournament.

Referees

- (Canada) Drew Fischer
- (Costa Rica) Juan Gabriel Calderón
- (El Salvador) Iván Barton
- (Guatemala) Mario Escobar
- (Guatemala) Walter López
- (Honduras) Saíd Martínez
- (Jamaica) Oshane Nation
- (Jamaica) Daneon Parchment
- (Mexico) Adonai Escobedo
- (Mexico) Marco Ortíz
- (Mexico) Fernando Hernández
- (Mexico) César Ramos
- (United States) Armando Villarreal
- (United States) Rubiel Vazquez

Support referees

- (Costa Rica) Keylor Herrera
- (Dominican Republic) Randy Encarnación
- (Grenada) Reon Radix
- (Guatemala) Bryan López
- (Mexico) Fernando Guerrero
- (United States) Joe Dickerson

Assistant referees

- (Canada) Micheal Barwegen
- (Costa Rica) Juan Carlos Mora
- (Dominican Republic) Raymundo Feliz
- (El Salvador) David Morán
- (El Salvador) Juan Zumba
- (Guatemala) Humberto Panjoj
- (Guatemala) Luis Ventura
- (Honduras) Walter López
- (Honduras) Christian Ramírez
- (Jamaica) Ojay Duhaney
- (Jamaica) Jassett Kerr-Wilson
- (Mexico) Marco Bisguerra
- (Mexico) Enrique Bustos
- (Mexico) Karen Díaz
- (Mexico) Christian Espinosa
- (Mexico) Alberto Morín
- (Mexico) Jorge Sánchez
- (Nicaragua) Keytzel Corrales
- (Nicaragua) Henri Pupiro
- (Suriname) Zachari Zeegelaar
- (Trinidad and Tobago) Caleb Wales
- (United States) Kyle Atkins
- (United States) Logan Brown
- (United States) Kathryn Nesbitt
- (United States) Corey Parker
- (United States) Cory Richardson

Video assistant referees

- (Costa Rica) Ricardo Montero
- (Costa Rica) Benjamín Pineda
- (El Salvador) Ismael Cornejo
- (Honduras) Melissa Borjas
- (Honduras) Selvin Brown
- (Honduras) Shirley Perelló
- (Mexico) Jorge Pérez Durán
- (Mexico) Erick Miranda
- (Mexico) Guillermo Pacheco
- (Mexico) Luis Enrique Santander
- (Nicaragua) Tatiana Guzmán
- (United States) Allen Chapman
- (United States) Tim Ford
- (United States) Edvin Jurisevic
- (United States) Chris Penso

== Group stage ==
Tie-breaking criteria for group play
The ranking of teams in the group stage was determined as follows:
1. Points obtained in all group matches;
2. Goal difference in all group matches;
3. Number of goals scored in all group matches;
4. Points obtained in the matches played between the teams in question;
5. Goal difference in the matches played between the teams in question;
6. Number of goals scored in the matches played between the teams in question;
7. Fair play points in all group matches (only one deduction could be applied to a player in a single match):
  - Yellow card: −1 points;
  - Indirect red card (second yellow card): −3 points;
  - Direct red card: −4 points;
  - Yellow card and direct red card: −5 points;
8. Drawing of lots.

=== Group A ===
| Pos | Team | Pld | W | D | L | GF | GA | GD | Pts | Qualification |
|---|---|---|---|---|---|---|---|---|---|---|
| 1 | United States (H) | 3 | 2 | 1 | 0 | 13 | 1 | +12 | 7 | Advance to knockout stage |
| 2 | Jamaica | 3 | 2 | 1 | 0 | 10 | 2 | +8 | 7 | Advance to knockout stage |
| 3 | Trinidad and Tobago | 3 | 1 | 0 | 2 | 4 | 10 | −6 | 3 | |
| 4 | Saint Kitts and Nevis | 3 | 0 | 0 | 3 | 0 | 14 | −14 | 0 | |

Source: CONCACAF
(H) Co-host
June 24, 2023
22:06 (21:06 UTC−5) (Note: The United States vs Jamaica match, originally scheduled at 21:30 EDT (UTC−4), was re-scheduled for 22:06 EDT.)

| United States | 1–1 | Jamaica |
|---|---|---|
| Vázquez 88' | Report | Lowe 13' |

Soldier Field, Chicago
Attendance: 36,666
Referee: César Ramos (Mexico)
June 25, 2023
16:00 (Note: The Trinidad and Tobago vs Saint Kitts and Nevis match, originally scheduled at 15:30 EDT (UTC−4), was delayed until 16:00 EDT by weather conditions.)

| Trinidad and Tobago | 3–0 | Saint Kitts and Nevis |
|---|---|---|
| A. Jones 43'; Fortune 65'; Ible 73' (o.g.) | Report |

DRV PNK Stadium, Fort Lauderdale
Attendance: 3,646
Referee: Saíd Martínez (Honduras)

June 28, 2023
19:30 (18:30 UTC−5)

| Jamaica | 4–1 | Trinidad and Tobago |
|---|---|---|
| Gray 14', 30'; Bailey 18'; Richards 90+2' | Report | Rampersad 49' |

CityPark, St. Louis
Attendance: 21,216
Referee: Fernando Guerrero (Mexico)
June 28, 2023
21:30 (20:30 UTC−5)

| Saint Kitts and Nevis | 0–6 | United States |
|---|---|---|
| | Report | Mihailovic 12', 79'; Reynolds 14'; Ferreira 16', 25', 50' |

CityPark, St. Louis
Attendance: 21,216
Referee: Juan Gabriel Calderón (Costa Rica)

July 2, 2023
19:00

| United States | 6–0 | Trinidad and Tobago |
|---|---|---|
| Ferreira 14', 38', 45+3' (pen.); Cowell 65'; Busio 79'; Vázquez 90+4' | Report |

Bank of America Stadium, Charlotte
Attendance: 47,382
Referee: Mario Escobar (Guatemala)
July 2, 2023
19:00 (16:00 UTC−7)

| Jamaica | 5–0 | Saint Kitts and Nevis |
|---|---|---|
| Archibald 30' (o.g.); Russell 45+2'; Bernard 49'; Johnson 72'; Burke 74' | Report |

Levi's Stadium, Santa Clara
Attendance: 60,347
Referee: Adonai Escobedo (Mexico)

=== Group B ===
| Pos | Team | Pld | W | D | L | GF | GA | GD | Pts | Qualification |
|---|---|---|---|---|---|---|---|---|---|---|
| 1 | Mexico | 3 | 2 | 0 | 1 | 7 | 2 | +5 | 6 | Advance to knockout stage |
| 2 | Qatar | 3 | 1 | 1 | 1 | 3 | 3 | 0 | 4 | Advance to knockout stage |
| 3 | Honduras | 3 | 1 | 1 | 1 | 3 | 6 | −3 | 4 | |
| 4 | Haiti | 3 | 1 | 0 | 2 | 4 | 6 | −2 | 3 | |

Source: CONCACAF
June 25, 2023
18:00 (17:00 UTC-5)

| Haiti | 2–1 | Qatar |
|---|---|---|
| Nazon 45+1' (pen.); Pierrot 90+7' | Report | Abdurisag 20' |

NRG Stadium, Houston
Attendance: 66,255
Referee: Daneon Parchment (Jamaica)
June 25, 2023
20:00 (19:00 UTC-5)

| Mexico | 4–0 | Honduras |
|---|---|---|
| Romo 1', 23'; Pineda 52'; Chávez 64' | Report |

NRG Stadium, Houston
Attendance: 66,255
Referee: Mario Escobar (Guatemala)

June 29, 2023
19:45 (16:45 UTC-7)

| Qatar | 1–1 | Honduras |
|---|---|---|
| Al-Abdullah 7' | Report | Elis 90+6' |

State Farm Stadium, Glendale
Attendance: 34,517
Referee: Armando Villarreal (United States)
June 29, 2023
22:00 (19:00 UTC-7)

| Haiti | 1–3 | Mexico |
|---|---|---|
| Jean Jacques 78' | Report | Martín 46'; Adé 56' (o.g.); Giménez 83' |

State Farm Stadium, Glendale
Attendance: 34,517
Referee: Walter López (Guatemala)

July 2, 2023
21:00

| Honduras | 2–1 | Haiti |
|---|---|---|
| Bengtson 42'; Pinto 59' | Report | Pierrot 20' |

Bank of America Stadium, Charlotte
Attendance: 47,382
Referee: Oshane Nation (Jamaica)
July 2, 2023
21:00 (18:00 UTC-7)

| Mexico | 0–1 | Qatar |
|---|---|---|
| | Report | Shehata 27' |

Levi's Stadium, Santa Clara
Attendance: 60,347
Referee: Drew Fischer (Canada)

=== Group C ===
| Pos | Team | Pld | W | D | L | GF | GA | GD | Pts | Qualification |
|---|---|---|---|---|---|---|---|---|---|---|
| 1 | Panama | 3 | 2 | 1 | 0 | 6 | 4 | +2 | 7 | Advance to knockout stage |
| 2 | Costa Rica | 3 | 1 | 1 | 1 | 7 | 6 | +1 | 4 | Advance to knockout stage |
| 3 | Martinique | 3 | 1 | 0 | 2 | 7 | 9 | −2 | 3 | |
| 4 | El Salvador | 3 | 0 | 2 | 1 | 3 | 4 | −1 | 2 | |

Source: CONCACAF
June 26, 2023
18:30

| El Salvador | 1–2 | Martinique |
|---|---|---|
| Tamacas 90+5' (pen.) | Report | Burner 11'; Fortuné 16' |

DRV PNK Stadium, Fort Lauderdale
Attendance: 10,101
Referee: Adonai Escobedo (Mexico)
June 26, 2023
20:30

| Costa Rica | 1–2 | Panama |
|---|---|---|
| Suárez 90+1' | Report | Fajardo 23'; Bárcenas 68' |

DRV PNK Stadium, Fort Lauderdale
Attendance: 10,101
Referee: Drew Fischer (Canada)

June 30, 2023
18:30

| Martinique | 1–2 | Panama |
|---|---|---|
| Fabien 90+5' | Report | Fajardo 57'; Murillo 69' |

Red Bull Arena, Harrison
Attendance: 22,615
Referee: Saíd Martínez (Honduras)
June 30, 2023
20:30

| El Salvador | 0–0 | Costa Rica |
|---|---|---|
| | Report |

Red Bull Arena, Harrison
Attendance: 22,615
Referee: César Ramos (Mexico)

July 4, 2023
20:30

| Costa Rica | 6–4 | Martinique |
|---|---|---|
| Waston 9'; Calvo 40'; Vargas 53'; Campbell 58' (pen.); Contreras 68'; Campos 89' | Report | Burner 18', 78'; Labeau 74' (pen.); Mexique 90+2' |

Red Bull Arena, Harrison
Attendance: 21,531
Referee: Bryan López (Guatemala)
July 4, 2023
20:30 (19:30 UTC-5)

| Panama | 2–2 | El Salvador |
|---|---|---|
| Escobar 26'; Díaz 71' | Report | B. Gil 4'; M. Gil 90+1' |

Shell Energy Stadium, Houston
Attendance: 20,002
Referee: Walter López (Guatemala)

=== Group D ===
| Pos | Team | Pld | W | D | L | GF | GA | GD | Pts | Qualification |
|---|---|---|---|---|---|---|---|---|---|---|
| 1 | Guatemala | 3 | 2 | 1 | 0 | 4 | 2 | +2 | 7 | Advance to knockout stage |
| 2 | Canada (H) | 3 | 1 | 2 | 0 | 6 | 4 | +2 | 5 | Advance to knockout stage |
| 3 | Guadeloupe | 3 | 1 | 1 | 1 | 8 | 6 | +2 | 4 | |
| 4 | Cuba | 3 | 0 | 0 | 3 | 3 | 9 | −6 | 0 | |

Source: CONCACAF
(H) Co-host
June 27, 2023
19:00

| Canada | 2–2 | Guadeloupe |
|---|---|---|
| Cavallini 49'; Lina 70' (o.g.) | Report | Ambrose 23'; Russell-Rowe 90+3' (o.g.) |

BMO Field, Toronto
Attendance: 15,301
Referee: Rubiel Vazquez (United States)
June 27, 2023
20:45

| Guatemala | 1–0 | Cuba |
|---|---|---|
| Lom 48' | Report |

DRV PNK Stadium, Fort Lauderdale
Attendance: 13,426
Referee: Oshane Nation (Jamaica)

July 1, 2023
19:30 (18:30 UTC-5)

| Cuba | 1–4 | Guadeloupe |
|---|---|---|
| A. Hernández 62' (pen.) | Report | Phaëton 13', 43'; Plumain 41'; Baron 50' |

Shell Energy Stadium, Houston
Attendance: 19,766
Referee: Iván Barton (El Salvador)
July 1, 2023
21:30 (20:30 UTC-5)

| Guatemala | 0–0 | Canada |
|---|---|---|
| | Report |

Shell Energy Stadium, Houston
Attendance: 19,766
Referee: Marco Ortíz (Mexico)

July 4, 2023
18:30

| Guadeloupe | 2–3 | Guatemala |
|---|---|---|
| Gravillon 27'; Plumain 63' (pen.) | Report | Rubin 39', 70'; Mejía 76' |

Red Bull Arena, Harrison
Attendance: 21,531
Referee: Juan Gabriel Calderón (Costa Rica)
July 4, 2023
18:30 (17:30 UTC-5)

| Canada | 4–2 | Cuba |
|---|---|---|
| Hoilett 21' (pen.); Osorio 27'; Nelson 47'; Millar 62' | Report | Paradela 45+4' (pen.); Reyes 89' (pen.) |

Shell Energy Stadium, Houston
Attendance: 20,002
Referee: Keylor Herrera (Costa Rica)

== Knockout stage ==
In the knockout stage, if the scores were equal when normal playing time expired, extra time was played for two periods of 15 minutes each. This was followed, if required, by a penalty shoot-out to determine the winners.

As with every tournament since 2005 (except 2015), there was no third place play-off.

=== Bracket ===
Quarter-finals
July 9 – Cincinnati
Guatemala | 0
Jamaica | 1
July 8 – Arlington
Mexico | 2
Costa Rica | 0
July 9 – Cincinnati
United States (p) | 2 (3)
Canada | 2 (2)
July 8 – Arlington
Panama | 4
Qatar | 0

Semi-finals
July 12 – Paradise
Jamaica | 0
Mexico | 3
July 12 – San Diego
United States | 1 (4)
Panama (p) | 1 (5)

Final
July 16 – Inglewood
Mexico | 1
Panama | 0

=== Quarter-finals ===
July 8, 2023
19:00 (18:00 UTC−5)

| Panama | 4–0 | Qatar |
|---|---|---|
| Bárcenas 19'; Díaz 56', 63', 65' | Report |

AT&T Stadium, Arlington
Attendance: 60,355
Referee: César Ramos (Mexico)

July 8, 2023
21:30 (20:30 UTC−5)

| Mexico | 2–0 | Costa Rica |
|---|---|---|
| Pineda 52' (pen.); É. Sánchez 87' | Report |

AT&T Stadium, Arlington
Attendance: 60,355
Referee: Saíd Martínez (Honduras)

July 9, 2023
17:00

| Guatemala | 0–1 | Jamaica |
|---|---|---|
| | Report | Bell 51' |

TQL Stadium, Cincinnati
Attendance: 24,979
Referee: Drew Fischer (Canada)

July 9, 2023
19:30

| United States | 2–2 (a.e.t.) | Canada |
|---|---|---|
| Vázquez 88'; Kennedy 114' (o.g.) | Report | Vitória 90+3' (pen.); Shaffelburg 109' |
Penalties
| Vázquez (penalty missed); Cowell (penalty scored); Busio (penalty scored); Ferreira (penalty scored) | 3–2 | (penalty missed) Vitória; (penalty missed) Fraser; (penalty scored) Miller; (penalty scored) Russell-Rowe; (penalty missed) Brym |

TQL Stadium, Cincinnati
Attendance: 24,979
Referee: Marco Ortíz (Mexico)

=== Semi-finals ===
July 12, 2023
19:30 (16:30 UTC−7)

| United States | 1–1 (a.e.t.) | Panama |
|---|---|---|
| Ferreira 105' | Report | I. Anderson 99' |
Penalties
| Ferreira (penalty missed); Mihailovic (penalty scored); Morris (penalty scored); Gressel (penalty scored); Miazga (penalty scored); Roldan (penalty missed) | 4–5 | (penalty scored) Escobar; (penalty scored) Díaz; (penalty missed) Martínez; (penalty scored) Bárcenas; (penalty scored) Waterman; (penalty scored) Carrasquilla |

Snapdragon Stadium, San Diego
Attendance: 31,690
Referee: Walter López (Guatemala)

July 12, 2023
22:00 (19:00 UTC−7)

| Jamaica | 0–3 | Mexico |
|---|---|---|
| | Report | Martín 2'; Chávez 30'; Alvarado 90+3' |

Allegiant Stadium, Paradise
Attendance: 29,886
Referee: Mario Escobar (Guatemala)

=== Final ===
July 16, 2023
19:30 (16:30 UTC−7)

| Mexico | 1–0 | Panama |
|---|---|---|
| Giménez 88' | Report |

SoFi Stadium, Inglewood
Attendance: 72,963
Referee: Saíd Martínez (Honduras)

== Statistics ==
=== Goalscorers ===
There were 105 goals scored in 31 matches, for an average of 3.39 goals per match.

7 goals

- (United States) Jesús Ferreira

4 goals

- (Panama) Ismael Díaz

3 goals

- (Martinique) Patrick Burner
- (United States) Brandon Vázquez

2 goals

- (Guadeloupe) Matthias Phaëton
- (Guadeloupe) Ange-Freddy Plumain
- (Guatemala) Rubio Rubin
- (Haiti) Frantzdy Pierrot
- (Jamaica) Demarai Gray
- (Mexico) Luis Chávez
- (Mexico) Santiago Giménez
- (Mexico) Henry Martín
- (Mexico) Orbelín Pineda
- (Mexico) Luis Romo
- (Panama) Yoel Bárcenas
- (Panama) José Fajardo
- (United States) Djordje Mihailovic

1 goal

- (Canada) Lucas Cavallini
- (Canada) Junior Hoilett
- (Canada) Jonathan Osorio
- (Canada) Jayden Nelson
- (Canada) Liam Millar
- (Canada) Jacob Shaffelburg
- (Canada) Steven Vitória
- (Cuba) Arichel Hernández
- (Cuba) Luis Paradela
- (Cuba) Maikel Reyes
- (Costa Rica) Francisco Calvo
- (Costa Rica) Joel Campbell
- (Costa Rica) Diego Campos
- (Costa Rica) Anthony Contreras
- (Costa Rica) Aarón Suárez
- (Costa Rica) Juan Pablo Vargas
- (Costa Rica) Kendall Waston
- (El Salvador) Brayan Gil
- (El Salvador) Mayer Gil
- (El Salvador) Bryan Tamacas
- (Guadeloupe) Thierry Ambrose
- (Guadeloupe) Anthony Baron
- (Guadeloupe) Andreaw Gravillon
- (Guatemala) Darwin Lom
- (Guatemala) Carlos Mejía
- (Haiti) Danley Jean Jacques
- (Haiti) Duckens Nazon
- (Honduras) Jerry Bengtson
- (Honduras) Alberth Elis
- (Honduras) José Pinto
- (Jamaica) Leon Bailey
- (Jamaica) Amari'i Bell
- (Jamaica) Di'Shon Bernard
- (Jamaica) Cory Burke
- (Jamaica) Daniel Johnson
- (Jamaica) Damion Lowe
- (Jamaica) Dujuan Richards
- (Jamaica) Jon Russell
- (Martinique) Karl Fabien
- (Martinique) Kévin Fortuné
- (Martinique) Brighton Labeau
- (Martinique) Jonathan Mexique
- (Mexico) Roberto Alvarado
- (Mexico) Érick Sánchez
- (Panama) Fidel Escobar
- (Panama) Michael Amir Murillo
- (Panama) Iván Anderson
- (Qatar) Yusuf Abdurisag
- (Qatar) Tameem Al-Abdullah
- (Qatar) Hazem Shehata
- (Trinidad and Tobago) Ajani Fortune
- (Trinidad and Tobago) Alvin Jones
- (Trinidad and Tobago) Andre Rampersad
- (United States) Gianluca Busio
- (United States) Cade Cowell
- (United States) Bryan Reynolds

1 own goal

- (Canada) Scott Kennedy (against United States)
- (Canada) Jacen Russell-Rowe (against Guadeloupe)
- (Guadeloupe) Méddy Lina (against Canada)
- (Haiti) Ricardo Adé (against Mexico)
- (Saint Kitts and Nevis) Julani Archibald (against Jamaica)
- (Saint Kitts and Nevis) Jameel Ible (against Trinidad and Tobago)

Source: CONCACAF

=== Discipline ===
A player or team official was automatically suspended for the next match for the following offenses:

- Receiving a red card (red card suspensions could be extended for serious offenses)
- Receiving two yellow cards in two matches; yellow cards expired after the completion of the quarter-finals (yellow card suspensions were not carried forward to any other future international matches)

The following suspensions were served during the tournament:

| Player/Official | Offense(s) | Suspension(s) |
|---|---|---|
| (Martinique) Jonathan Rivierez | (red card) in Group C vs El Salvador (matchday 1; 26 June) | Group C vs Panama (matchday 2; 30 June) |
| (Jamaica) Damion Lowe | (yellow card) in Group A vs United States (matchday 1; 24 June); (yellow card) in Group A vs Trinidad and Tobago (matchday 2; 28 June) | Group A vs Saint Kitts and Nevis (matchday 3; 2 July) |
| (Saint Kitts and Nevis) Andre Burley | (yellow card) in Group A vs Trinidad and Tobago (matchday 1; 25 June); (yellow card) in Group A vs United States (matchday 2; 28 June) | Group A vs Jamaica (matchday 3; 2 July) |
| (Qatar) Bassam Al-Rawi | (yellow card) in Group B vs Haiti (matchday 1; 25 June); (yellow card) in Group B vs Honduras (matchday 2; 29 June) | Group B vs Mexico (matchday 3; 2 July) |
| (Honduras) Rubilio Castillo (after final whistle) | (red card) in Group B vs Qatar (matchday 2; 29 June) | Group B vs Haiti (matchday 3; 2 July) |
| (Qatar) Yusuf Abdurisag (after final whistle) | (red card) in Group B vs Honduras (matchday 2; 29 June) | Group B vs Mexico (matchday 3; 2 July); Quarter-finals vs. Panama; Third suspension served outside tournament (8 July) |
| (Mexico) Jorge Sánchez | (yellow card) in Group B vs Honduras (matchday 1; 25 June); (yellow card) in Group B vs Haiti (matchday 2; 29 June) | Group B vs Qatar (matchday 3; 2 July) |
| (Panama) Aníbal Godoy | (yellow card) in Group C vs Costa Rica (matchday 1; 26 June); (yellow card) in Group C vs Martinique (matchday 2; 30 June) | Group C vs El Salvador (matchday 3; 4 July) |
| (Cuba) Cavafe | (yellow card) in Group D vs Guatemala (matchday 1; 27 June); (yellow card) in Group D vs Guadeloupe (matchday 2; 1 July) | Group D vs Canada (matchday 3; 4 July) |
| (Cuba) Aldair Ruiz | (red card) in Group D vs Guadeloupe (matchday 2; 1 July) | Group D vs Canada (matchday 3; 4 July) |
| (Qatar) Tameem Al-Abdullah | (yellow card) in Group B vs Haiti (matchday 1; 25 June); (yellow card) in Group B vs Mexico (matchday 3; 2 July) | Quarter-finals vs Panama (8 July) |
| (Qatar) Meshaal Barsham | (yellow card) in Group B vs Honduras (matchday 2; 29 June); (yellow card) in Group B vs Mexico (matchday 3; 2 July) | Quarter-finals vs Panama (8 July) |
| (Qatar) Ahmed Fatehi | (yellow card) in Group B vs Honduras (matchday 2; 29 June); (yellow card) in Group B vs Mexico (matchday 3; 2 July) | Quarter-finals vs Panama (8 July) |
| (Qatar) Tarek Salman | (yellow card) in Group B vs Haiti (matchday 1; 25 June); (yellow card) in Group B vs Mexico (matchday 3; 2 July) | Quarter-finals vs Panama (8 July) |
| (Qatar) Mohammed Waad | (yellow card) in Group B vs Honduras (matchday 2; 29 June); (yellow card) in Group B vs Mexico (matchday 3; 2 July) | Quarter-finals vs Panama (8 July) |
| (Guadeloupe) Steve Solvet | (red card) in Group D vs Guatemala (matchday 3; 4 July) | Suspension served outside tournament |
| (Guatemala) Rodrigo Saravia | (yellow card) in Group D vs Cuba (matchday 1; 27 June); (yellow card) in Group D vs Guadeloupe (matchday 3; 4 July) | Quarter-finals vs Jamaica (9 July) |

=== Awards ===
The following Gold Cup awards were given at the conclusion of the tournament: the Golden Ball (best overall player), Golden Boot (top scorer), Golden Glove (best goalkeeper), Goal of the Tournament, Mark of a Fighter (fighting spirit) and Fair Play Trophy (most disciplined team).

Golden Ball
(Panama) Adalberto Carrasquilla
Golden Boot
(United States) Jesús Ferreira
7 goals, 0 assists
371 minutes played
Golden Glove
(Mexico) Guillermo Ochoa
Goal of the Tournament
(Guadeloupe) Anthony Baron
Mark of a Fighter
(Mexico) Santiago Giménez
Fair Play Trophy
United States

Best XI

The following players were chosen as the tournament's best eleven.

| Goalkeeper | Defenders | Midfielders | Forwards |
|---|---|---|---|
| (Mexico) Guillermo Ochoa | (Panama) Fidel Escobar (Mexico) Johan Vásquez (Mexico) Jorge Sánchez | (Mexico) Luis Chávez (Panama) Adalberto Carrasquilla (Mexico) Orbelín Pineda (Panama) Yoel Bárcenas (Jamaica) Demarai Gray | (United States) Jesús Ferreira (Panama) Ismael Díaz |

== Marketing ==
=== Branding ===
The official logo was unveiled on September 28, 2020, during the final draw in Miami, Florida. The official slogan of the tournament was "This Is Ours".

=== Broadcasting rights ===
| Territory | Broadcast | Ref. |
|---|---|---|
| United States | Fox Sports (United States) | |
| Mexico | TUDN (Mexican TV channel) | |
| MENA | BeIN Sports | |
| Caribbean | ESPN | |
| North America | ESPN | |
| Central America | ESPN | |
| South America | ESPN | |
| United Kingdom | Premier Sports | |
| Spain | LaLiga+ | |
| Balkans | Telemedia | |
| Germany | Sportdigital | |

=== Sponsorship ===
The following were announced as global sponsors of the tournament:

- Allstate
- Amazon.com
- BMO Harris Bank
- Corona
- Gatorade
- Cerveza Modelo de México
- Lay’s
- MasterCard
- Nike, Inc.
- O'Reilly Auto Parts
- Qatar Airways
- Scotiabank
- Six Flags
- Ticketmaster
- Toyota
- Unilever
- Valvoline

== Symbols ==
=== Match ball ===
Flight by Nike was the tournament's official match ball.

=== Music ===
"I Wrote a Song" by British singer-songwriter Mae Muller served as the main official song of the tournament. It represented the United Kingdom in the Eurovision Song Contest 2023, finishing in 25th place.

"Sold Out" by American country singer Hardy served as the official anthem of the tournament.

"One World" by Moroccan DJ RedOne, Kosovo-Albanian singer Adelina and Now United also served as an official song of the tournament.

"No Hay Soló Un Juego" by American singer Akon and Latin American artists Chiquis, Oriana, Lasso, and Adriel Favela served as the official Spanish-language song of the tournament, the first to be selected internally and not via an official broadcaster.
