= Kurşunlu, Aksu =

Kurşunlu
- Neighbourhood
- Location in Turkey
- Coordinates: 37°04′34″N 30°48′35″E
- Country: Turkey
- Province: Antalya
- District: Aksu
- Population (2022): 2,152
- Time zone: UTC+3 (TRT)

Kurşunlu is a village and neighbourhood of the municipality and district of Aksu, Antalya Province, Turkey. Its population is 2,152 (2022). The village is located near the Kurşunlu Waterfall Nature Park.
