= Kemerağzı, Aksu =

Kemerağzı
- Neighbourhood
- Location in Turkey
- Coordinates: 36°52′51″N 30°51′45″E
- Country: Turkey
- Province: Antalya
- District: Aksu
- Population (2022): 5,991
- Time zone: UTC+3 (TRT)

Kemerağzı is a neighbourhood in the municipality and district of Aksu, Antalya Province, Turkey. Its population is 5,991 (2022).
