= Yenidumanlar, Aksu =

Yenidumanlar
- Neighbourhood
- Location in Turkey
- Coordinates: 37°00′N 30°54′E
- Country: Turkey
- Province: Antalya
- District: Aksu
- Population (2022): 264
- Time zone: UTC+3 (TRT)

Yenidumanlar is a neighbourhood of the municipality and district of Aksu, Antalya Province, Turkey. Its population is 264 (2022).
