= Aksu, Antalya =

Aksu Çalkaya
- District and municipality
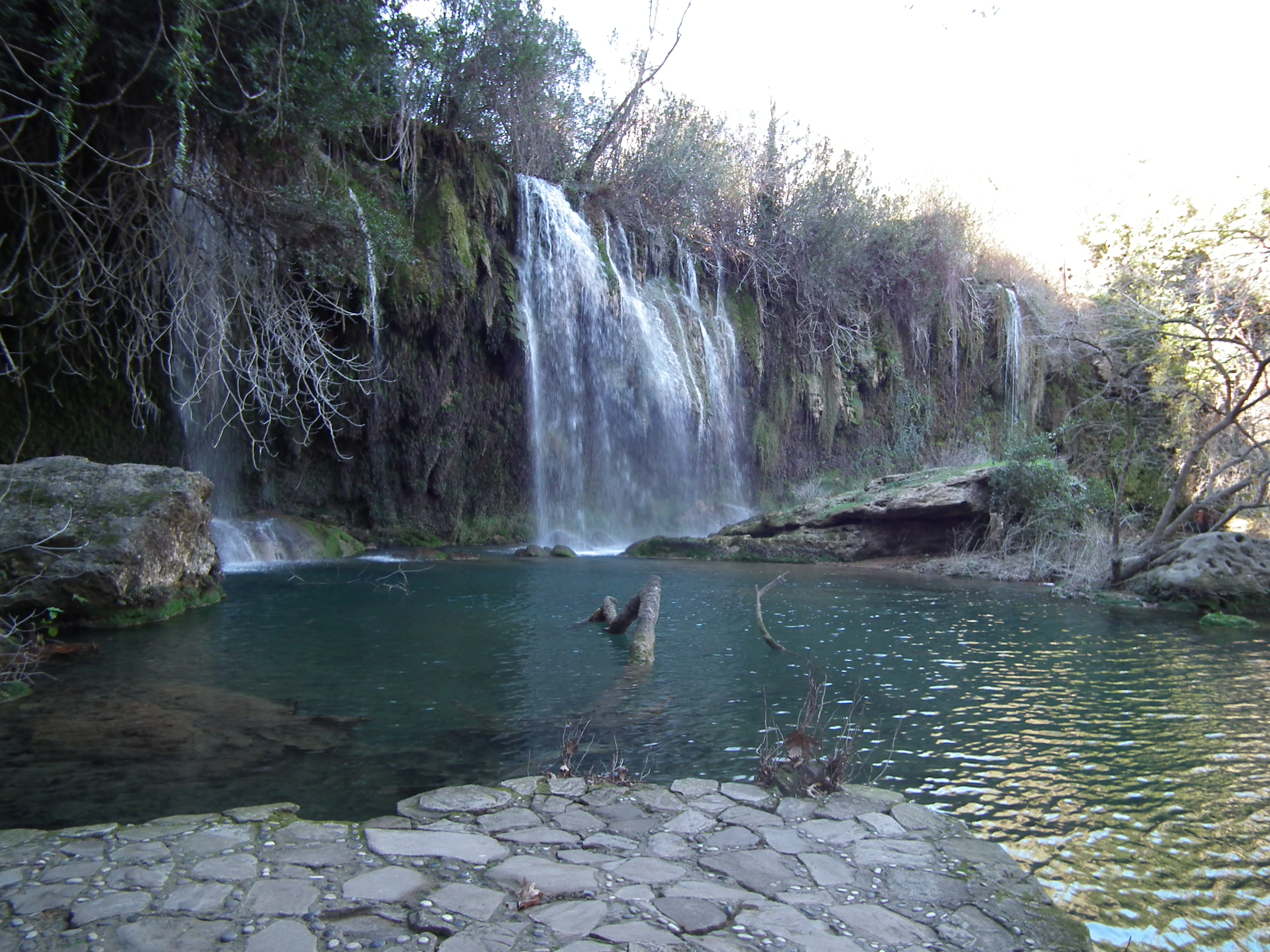
- Kurşunlu Waterfalls in Fettahlı, Aksu

- Map showing Aksu District in Antalya Province

- Location within Turkey
- Coordinates: 36°57′N 30°51′E
- Country: Turkey
- Province: Antalya

Government
  - Mayor: İsa Yıldırım (AKP)
- Area: 406 km^{2} (157 sq mi)
- Elevation: 45 m (148 ft)
- Population (2022): 77,623
  - Density: 191/km^{2} (495/sq mi)
- Time zone: UTC+3 (TRT)
- Postal code: 07110
- Area code: 0242
- Website: www.aksu.bel.tr

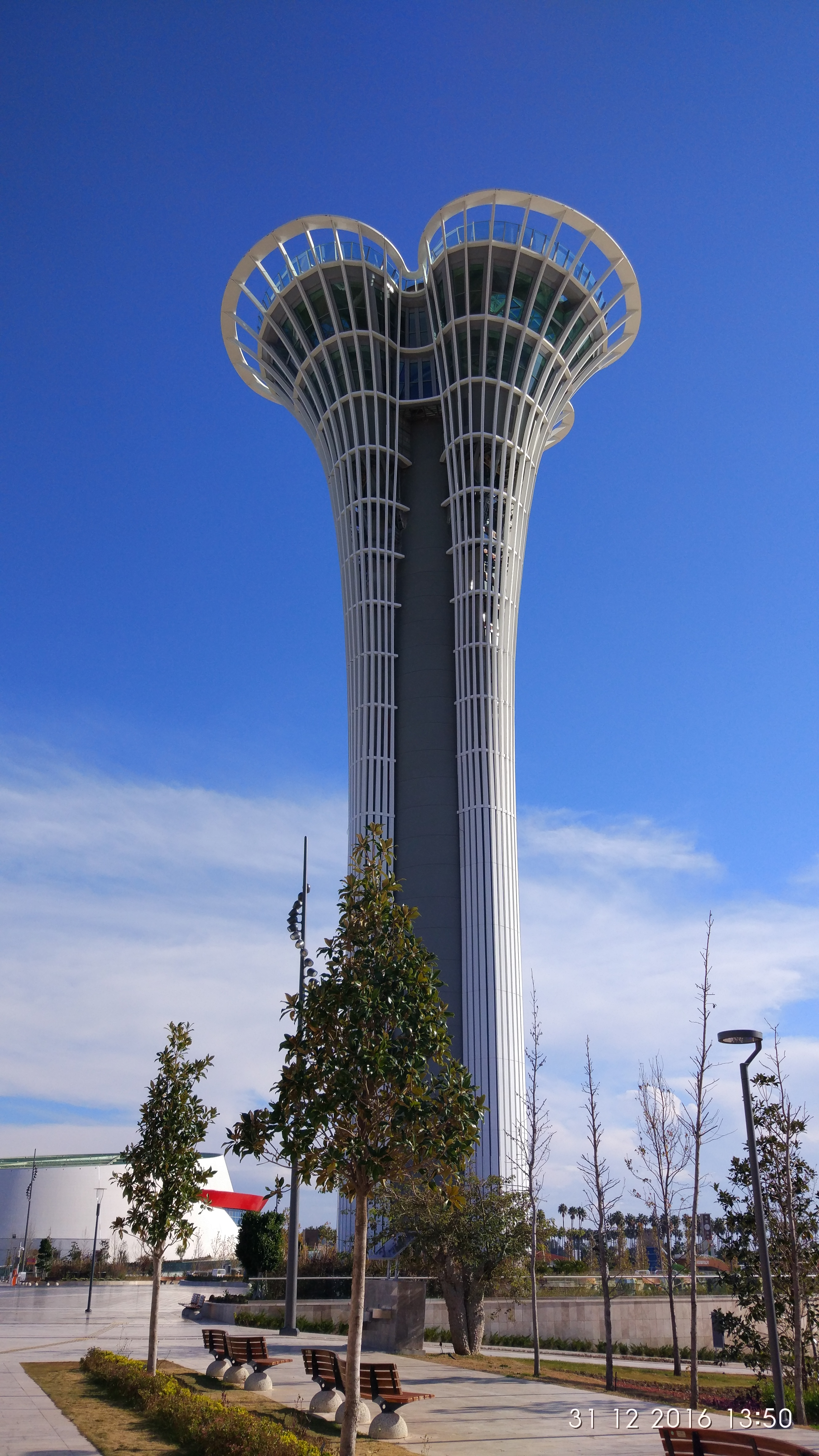
Expo Kulesi in 2016.

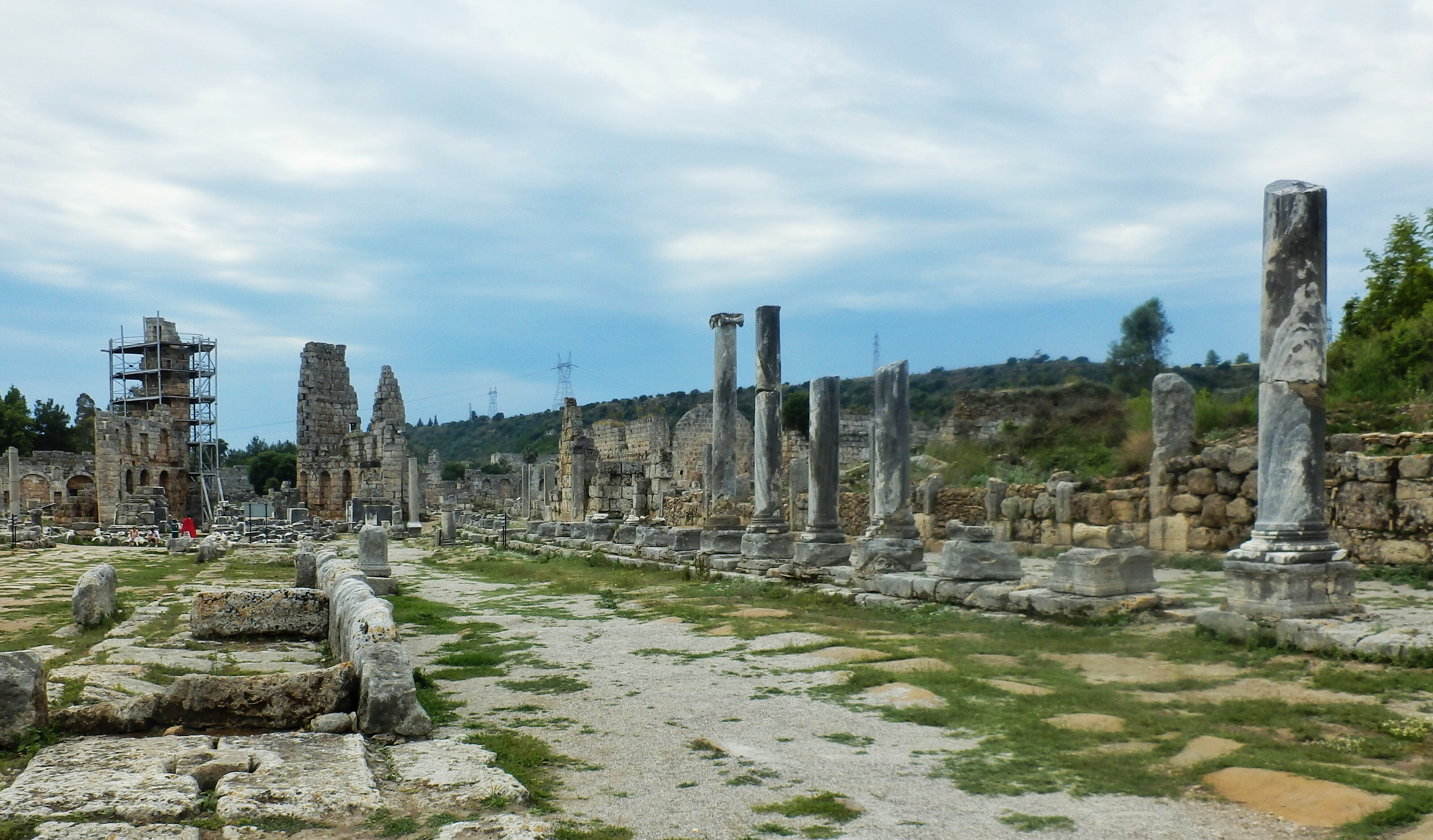
Southern part of Perge - Main street

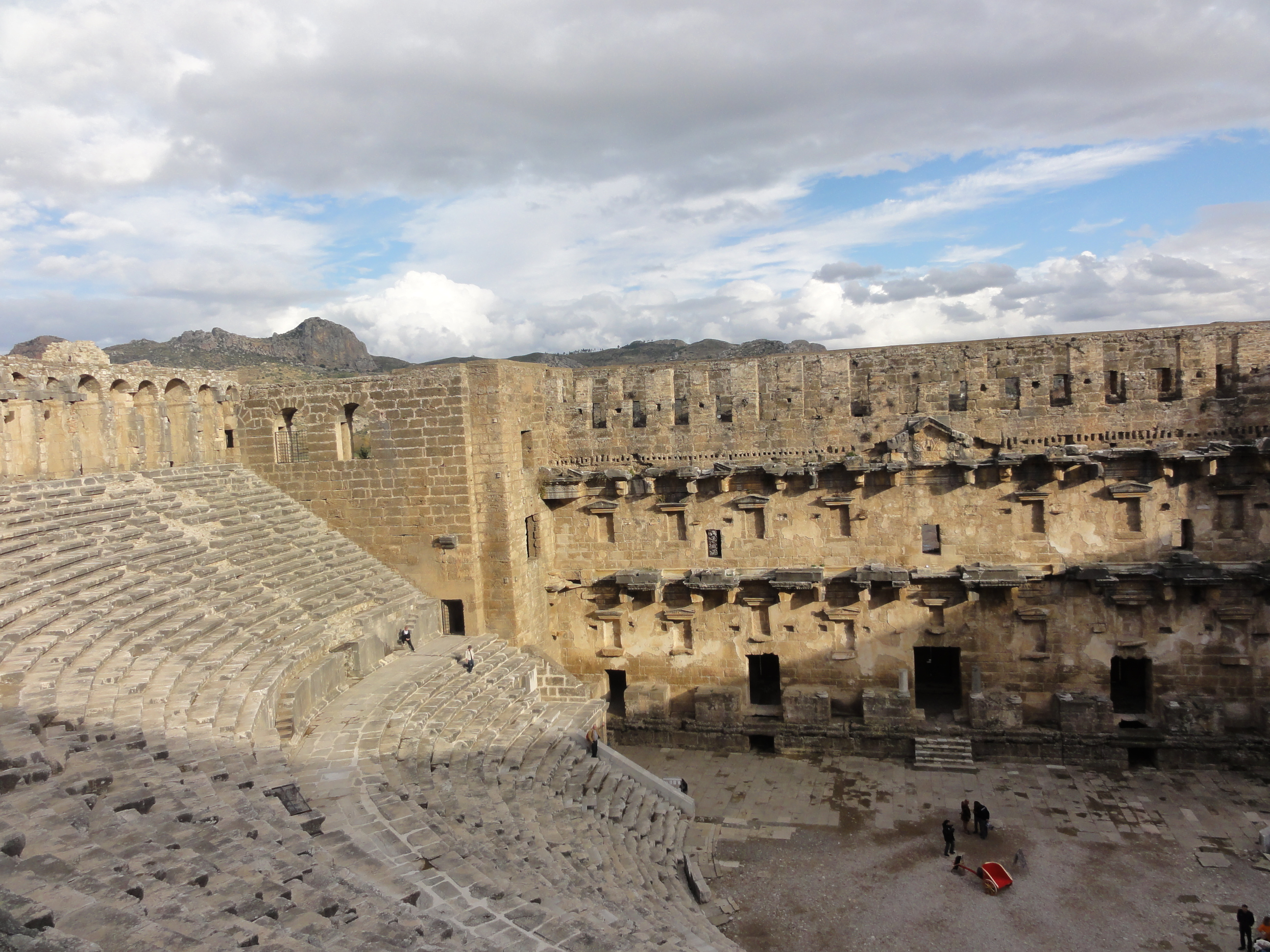
Skene of Ancient Roman theatre (Perge) in Aksu, Antalya

Aksu is a municipality and district of Antalya Province, Turkey. Its area is 406 km^{2}, and its population is 82,560 (2024).

== Geography ==
Aksu is situated on the Turkish state highway D.400 which connects Antalya to Mersin. It is almost merged to Antalya, the province center and in fact it is included in Greater Antalya. The distance to Antalya central town is about 18 kilometres (11 mi).

=== Composition ===
There are 35 neighbourhoods in Aksu District:

- Alaylı
- Altıntaş
- Atatürk
- Barbaros
- Boztepe
- Çalkaya
- Çamköy
- Cihadiye
- Cumhuriyet
- Dumanlar
- Fatih
- Fettahlı
- Gökdere
- Güloluk
- Güzelyurt
- Hacıaliler
- İhsaniye
- Karaçallı
- Karaöz
- Kayadibi
- Kemerağzı
- Konak
- Kumköy
- Kundu
- Kurşunlu
- Macun
- Mandırlar
- Murtuna
- Pınarlı
- Soğucaksu
- Solak
- Topallı
- Yenidumanlar
- Yeşilkaraman
- Yurtpınar

== History ==
The area around Aksu was a part of Pamphylia of the antiquity. Ancient city of Perga is within Aksu district. Later the area around Aksu became a part of Roman Empire, Byzantine Empire, Anatolian beyliks, and the Ottoman Empire. During the Turkish republic era, there were five nearby villages Aksu and Çalkaya being the most important ones. Between 1977 and 1994 these villages were declared townships and finally in 1999 they were merged to form the district of Aksu.

== Damage on January 26th ==
On January 26th, 2026 at 19:10pm local time, an IF2 ranked tornado hit Aksu, Antalya. It moved through coastal areas, where it caused severe damage by tearing boats from their moorings, overturning and smashing many of them along the shoreline and riverbanks. As it continued inland, the tornado damaged or destroyed piers and nearby structures while also blowing down trees, traffic signs, and streetlights, leaving debris scattered across the area. Agricultural zones were heavily impacted as well, with numerous greenhouses torn apart and crops destroyed, while additional structural damage included roofs being ripped off buildings and windows shattered. The tornado continued to move further inland where it eventually dissipated over fields. One person was injured.

== Economy ==
The main economic activity and industry of Aksu is intensive agriculture. Various vegetables and fruits are produced. Tourism also plays a role in the district's economy. Perga, Kurşunlu Waterfall, Kundu beach are important tourist attractions.
