= Topallı, Aksu =

Topallı
- Neighbourhood
- Country: Turkey
- Province: Antalya
- District: Aksu
- Population (2022): 1,847
- Time zone: UTC+3 (TRT)

Topallı is a neighbourhood of the municipality and district of Aksu, Antalya Province, Turkey. Its population is 1,847 (2022).
