= Fettahlı, Aksu =

Fettahlı
- Neighbourhood
- Location in Turkey
- Coordinates: 36°59′12″N 30°48′27″E
- Country: Turkey
- Province: Antalya
- District: Aksu
- Population (2022): 1,300
- Time zone: UTC+3 (TRT)

Fettahlı is a neighbourhood of the municipality and district of Aksu, Antalya Province, Turkey. Its population is 1,300 (2022).

The neighbourhood is located to the east of the city of Antalya, within the Mediterranean region of Turkey.

The local economy is mainly based on agriculture, with greenhouse farming and citrus production being common in the area.

Fettahlı lies close to the Antalya–Alanya highway, providing easy access to the surrounding towns and to Antalya city centre.
