= Luis Chávez (footballer) =

Mexican footballer (born 1996)

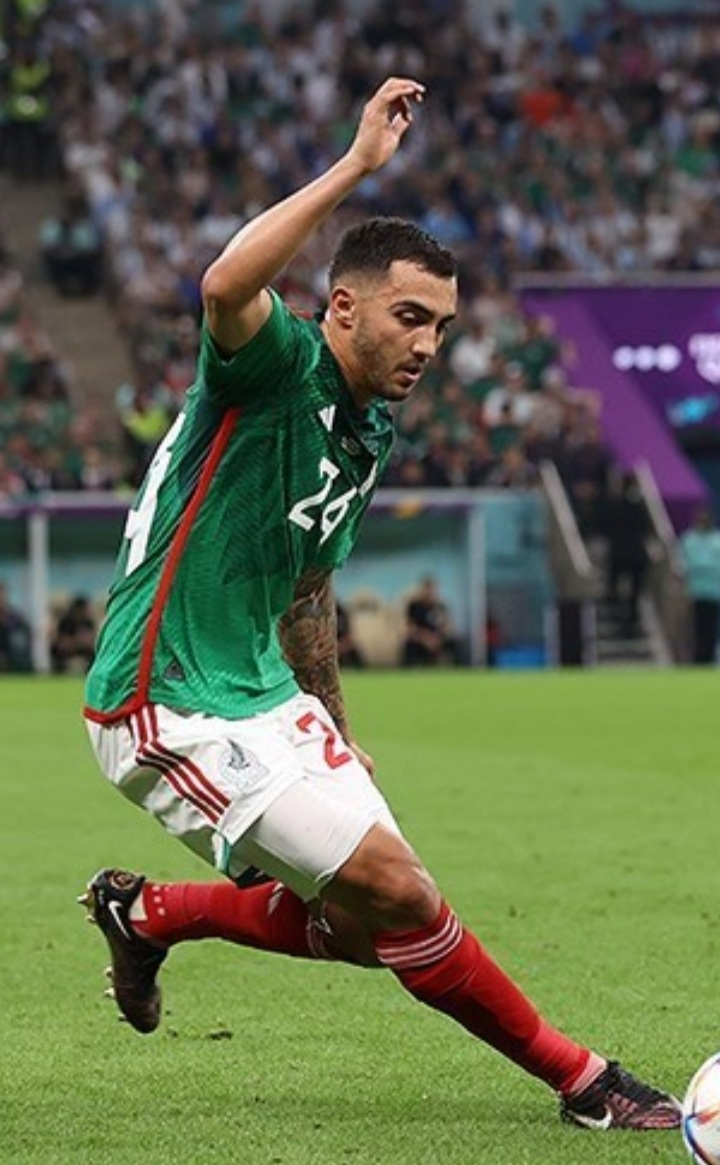
- Chávez with Mexico at the 2022 FIFA World Cup

Personal information
- Full name: Luis Gerardo Chávez Magallón
- Date of birth: 15 January 1996 (age 30)
- Place of birth: Cihuatlán, Jalisco, Mexico
- Height: 1.78 m (5 ft 10 in)
- Position: Midfielder

Team information
- Current team: Dynamo Moscow
- Number: 24

Youth career
- 2011: Pachuca
- 2012–2017: Tijuana

Senior career*
Years	Team	Apps	(Gls)
2014–2019	Tijuana	71	(3)
2019–2023	Pachuca	135	(14)
2023–	Dynamo Moscow	51	(7)

International career^{‡}
2022–	Mexico	48	(5)
Medal record
Men's football
Representing Mexico
CONCACAF Gold Cup
Winner	2023 United States–Canada
Winner	2025 United States–Canada
CONCACAF Nations League
Winner	2025 United States
Runner-up	2024 United States
Third place	2023 United States
- * Club domestic league appearances and goals as of 17 September 2026 ‡ National team caps and goals as of 3 October 2026

Luis Gerardo Chávez Magallón (born 15 January 1996) is a Mexican professional footballer who plays as a midfielder for Russian Premier League club Dynamo Moscow and the Mexico national team.

== Club career ==
Chávez began his career at the youth academy of Tijuana and made his professional debut for the club in July 2014, playing in a league match against Puebla. Five years later, he was transferred to Pachuca. In October 2022, he achieved his first professional honor as Pachuca secured the Apertura 2022 title.

Following the 2022 FIFA World Cup, Chávez attracted interest from a number of Mexican clubs; however, he decided to decline all of these offers in favour of a move to Europe.

In July 2023, Russian Premier League club Dynamo Moscow reached an agreement to sign Chávez; however, economic sanctions against Russian entities prevented Pachuca from completing the deal. On 27 August, the transfer was completed after Chávez paid his own release clause. He signed a four-year contract and went on to become the first Mexican player to participate in Russian football.

In June 2025, Chávez sustained a serious injury during training while on international duty for the Gold Cup. In March 2026, he made his first competitive appearance in nine months.

== International career ==
On 27 April 2022, Chávez made his senior national team debut under Gerardo Martino in a friendly match against Guatemala.

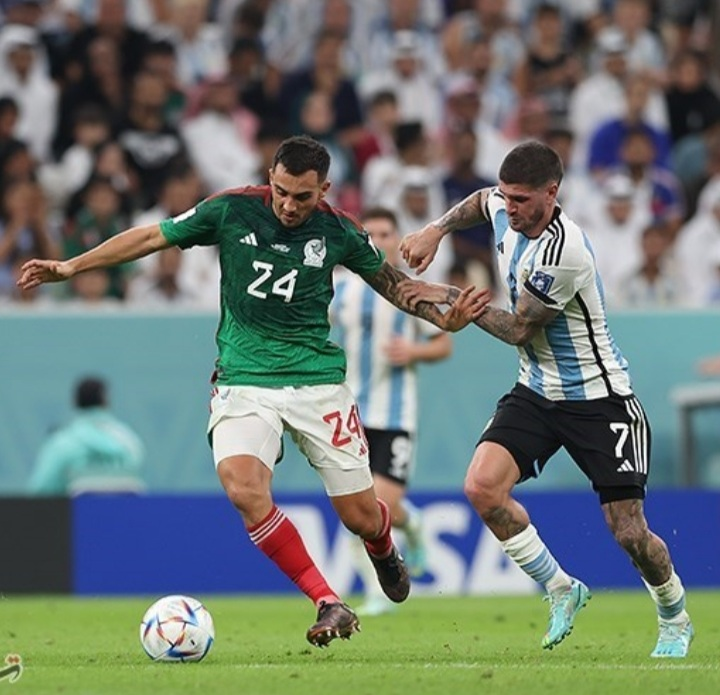
Chávez with Mexico at the 2022 FIFA World Cup

In October 2022, Chávez was named in Mexico's preliminary 31-man squad for the 2022 FIFA World Cup, and in November, he was ultimately included in the final 26-man roster. On 30 November, Chávez scored a goal from a free kick against Saudi Arabia as Mexico overpowered Saudi Arabia 2–1 to send Saudi Arabia out of the tournament, attaining him the player of the match award. Despite his team's failure to progress from the group stage as well, his goal was a 30-yard free kick goal hailed as a "stunner" and "amazing goal" by the media, as it was nominated as best goal of the tournament.

Chávez was named in the 26-man squad for the 2026 FIFA World Cup, hosted on home soil. He appeared as a second-half substitute in the tournament opener against South Africa and then remained on the bench in all subsequent Mexico's games as they were eliminated by England in the Round of 16.

== Career statistics ==
=== Club ===
As of match played on 17 September 2026

Appearances and goals by club, season and competition
Club	Season	League			Cup (Note: Includes Copa MX, Russian Cup)		Continental		Total	
Club	Season	Division	Apps	Goals	Apps	Goals	Apps	Goals	Apps	Goals
Tijuana	2014–15	Liga MX	4	0	9	0	—		13	0
Tijuana	2015–16	Liga MX	10	0	8	1	—		18	1
Tijuana	2016–17	Liga MX	9	1	6	0	—		15	1
Tijuana	2017–18	Liga MX	25	2	3	0	2 (Note: Appearances in CONCACAF Champions League)	0	30	2
Tijuana	2018–19	Liga MX	23	0	5	1	—		28	1
Tijuana	Total		71	3	31	2	2	0	104	5
Pachuca	2019–20	Liga MX	20	2	6	0	—		26	2
Pachuca	2020–21	Liga MX	40	3	—		—		40	3
Pachuca	2021–22	Liga MX	35	6	—		—		35	6
Pachuca	2022–23	Liga MX	40	3	—		2	0	42	3
Pachuca	Total		135	14	6	0	2	0	143	14
Dynamo Moscow	2023–24	Russian Premier League	23	4	9	0	—		32	4
Dynamo Moscow	2024–25	Russian Premier League	19	3	8	0	—		27	3
Dynamo Moscow	2025–26	Russian Premier League	4	0	1	0	—		5	0
Dynamo Moscow	2026–27	Russian Premier League	5	0	3	0	—		8	0
Dynamo Moscow	Total		51	7	21	0	—		72	7
Career total			257	24	58	2	4	0	319	26

=== International ===
As of match played on 3 October 2026

Appearances and goals by national team and year
National team	Year	Apps	Goals
Mexico	2022	12	1
Mexico	2023	16	3
Mexico	2024	9	0
Mexico	2025	5	0
Mexico	2026	6	1
Total		48	5

Scores and results list Mexico's goal tally first.

List of international goals scored by Luis Chávez
No.	Date	Venue	Opponent	Score	Result	Competition
1.	30 November 2022	Lusail Iconic Stadium, Lusail, Qatar	Saudi Arabia	2–0	2–1	2022 FIFA World Cup
2.	25 June 2023	NRG Stadium, Houston, United States	Honduras	4–0	4–0	2023 CONCACAF Gold Cup
3.	12 July 2023	Allegiant Stadium, Paradise, United States	Jamaica	2–0	3–0	2023 CONCACAF Gold Cup
4.	21 November 2023	Estadio Azteca, Mexico City, Mexico	Honduras	1–0	2–0 (a.e.t.)	2023–24 CONCACAF Nations League A
5.	4 June 2026	Estadio Nemesio Díez, Toluca, Mexico	Serbia	5–1	5–1	Friendly

== Honours ==
Pachuca

- Liga MX: Apertura 2022

Mexico

- CONCACAF Gold Cup: 2023, 2025
- CONCACAF Nations League: 2024–25

Individual

- Liga MX All-Star: 2022
- IFFHS Men's CONCACAF Best XI: 2022
- Liga MX Best Defensive Midfielder: 2022–23
- CONCACAF Gold Cup Best XI: 2023
