= İhsaniye, Aksu =

İhsaniye
- Neighbourhood
- Country: Turkey
- Province: Antalya
- District: Aksu
- Population (2022): 357
- Time zone: UTC+3 (TRT)

İhsaniye is a neighbourhood of the municipality and district of Aksu, Antalya Province, Turkey. Its population is 357 (2022).
