= Kayadibi, Aksu =

Kayadibi
- Neighbourhood
- Location in Turkey
- Coordinates: 37.209°N 30.809°E
- Country: Turkey
- Province: Antalya
- District: Aksu
- Population (2022): 202
- Time zone: UTC+3 (TRT)

Kayadibi is a neighbourhood of the municipality and district of Aksu, Antalya Province, Turkey. Its population is 202 (2022).
