= Dumanlar, Aksu =

Dumanlar
- Neighbourhood
- Location in Turkey
- Coordinates: 36°59′54″N 30°54′09″E
- Country: Turkey
- Province: Antalya
- District: Aksu
- Population (2022): 851
- Time zone: UTC+3 (TRT)

Dumanlar is a neighbourhood of the municipality and district of Aksu, Antalya Province, Turkey. Its population is 851 (2022).
