= Karaçallı, Aksu =

Karaçallı
- Neighbourhood
- Location in Turkey
- Coordinates: 36°53′N 30°52′E
- Country: Turkey
- Province: Antalya
- District: Aksu
- Population (2022): 1,193
- Time zone: UTC+3 (TRT)

Karaçallı is a neighbourhood of the municipality and district of Aksu, Antalya Province, Turkey. Its population is 1,193 (2022).
