= Asociacion SOLAC =

Peruvian non-profit organisation

SOLAC logo

Asociación SOLAC, a Peruvian non-profit organization, was founded (under this name) in 2003 by students of the Universidad Catolica de Lima and has grown to include a cooperative membership of scholars and students from the United States and Peru. The organization regularly carries out projects in the vicinity of Lima, oriented towards social and economic development.

== History ==
SOLAC was founded in 2001 under the pseudonym of "La Causa." Since that point it has been guided by a group of young people, of varying disciplines, from the Facultad de Estudios Generales Letras of the Pontificia Universidad Catolica del Peru.

The first projects undertaken were short term projects in which various kinds of aid resources were delivered to needy communities in the vicinity of Lima. By means of small fund-raising activities, the organization gathered clothing, books, and other items of basic necessity to be donated. Simultaneously, small workshops and recreational activities were being carried out in those areas.

Little by little the idea of SOLAC matured and became institutionalized. Work continued in 2004-2005 when SOLAC staged a photo exhibition entitled "Yuyanapaq" at the University of Virginia, detailing the twenty years of political violence in Peru. This exposé was accompanied by talks and films linked to the theme of human rights in general. The event was repeated the following year, also yielding promising results.

The following year, a diagnostic survey was undertaken in the east of Lima, with the intent of identifying populations whose basic needs were not being met, and who were living in states of extreme poverty. In this way, an exhaustive diagnostic was completed in a brick-producing area, in the district of Chosica Lurigancho, situated in the east cone of Lima. The duration of the study was six to eight months, in which surveys and interviews were carried out, focus groups were implemented, as well as other techniques aimed at collecting statistics.

The results and statistics yielded by their diagnostic served as a platform for the design and subsequent execution of the project, Biblioteca Comunitaria Alto Peru, which is being carried out at the present time.

== Current project ==
Lima has long been accustomed to migrations from the Andean anterior. In its most recent form, however, migration and the inexorable demands of industry on Lima's peripheries have resulted in a situation whereby child labour is ubiquitous, standards of living and sanitation are abysmal, and the average family is forced to adopt a life suited to refugees. The site of our most recent project, Alto Perú (not to be confused with Upper Peru), is one of the poorest districts of the shanty town conglomerates collectively known as "Los Conos" or "Pueblos jóvenes", the cone-shaped barrios that delimit Lima's northern, southern, and eastern borders. Although extreme poverty is a problem in most cono neighbourhoods, Alto Perú, which additionally suffers the direct burdens of industrial contamination, is by many estimates the gravest case.

After visiting Alto Perú, SOLAC assembled a team of anthropologists and public health officials to survey the population, in order to research possible solutions to the community's socio-economic problems. The conclusions of their research were predictable, but nevertheless startling. Poor living conditions and significant environmental problems have harmed the development of local children in both tangible and intangible ways. Poor labour conditions have detracted from the academic performance of children, as parents are rarely available to help them with their schoolwork, and the children struggle to apply themselves intellectually in the midst of adverse living conditions. SOLAC is dedicated to ameliorating some of these problems with the creation of an education centre and library where the health and educational development of Alto Perú’s youth, so severely damaged by the area's poor living conditions, can be resuscitated and reinvigorated.

The principal beneficiaries of the program are the 180 students of the Alto Perú primary school, with the adjacent communities enjoying the benefits of the centre through related initiatives. When fully completed, the centre will host four principal services:

1. A comprehensive library with volumes for all academic levels and in several languages.
2. Academic workshops that both complement and extend the curriculum of the Alto Perú School. This includes remedial attention for students with outstanding needs, special programs for intellectual development, after-school tutoring, and English language classes.
3. A wide range of health and wellness campaigns that target both household and environmental issues facing the community, carried out in conjunction with local medical authorities and NGOs.
4. Counselling and psychological support for students who show signs of chronic depression, in a community where 1 in 7 children has contemplated suicide.

In May 2006, the construction and implementation of the centre commenced with the help of over 20 international and local volunteers. The organisation continually works alongside the community to create sustainable solutions for the project, including the training of tutors and long-term collaborations with local and international universities. The goal is to transfer the authority of the centre to local leaders, having promoted the necessary tools to ensure continued benefits to the community. Additionally, a campaign will start for more comprehensive legal solutions to the chronic structural problems of pollution and child labour which plague the peripheral areas of Lima.
