= Solak, Aksu =

Solak
- Neighbourhood
- Location in Turkey
- Coordinates: 36°58′N 30°54′E
- Country: Turkey
- Province: Antalya
- District: Aksu
- Population (2022): 631
- Time zone: UTC+3 (TRT)

Solak is a neighbourhood of the municipality and district of Aksu, Antalya Province, Turkey. Its population is 631 (2022).
