= Gökdere, Aksu =

Gökdere
- Neighbourhood
- Country: Turkey
- Province: Antalya
- District: Aksu
- Population (2022): 1,763
- Time zone: UTC+3 (TRT)

Gökdere is a neighbourhood in the municipality and district of Aksu, Antalya Province, Turkey. Its population is 1,763 (2022).
