= Yeşilkaraman, Aksu =

Yeşilkaraman
- Neighbourhood
- Location in Turkey
- Coordinates: 37°07′N 30°48′E
- Country: Turkey
- Province: Antalya
- District: Aksu
- Population (2022): 702
- Time zone: UTC+3 (TRT)

Yeşilkaraman is a neighbourhood of the municipality and district of Aksu, Antalya Province, Turkey. Its population is 702 (2022).
