= Sholak =

Sholak শোলক Solak
- Village
- Location in Bangladesh
- Coordinates: 22°54′N 90°13′E
- Country: Bangladesh
- Division: Barisal Division
- District: Barisal District
- Upazila: Wazirpur Upazila

Area
  - Total: 4.46 km^{2} (1.72 sq mi)

Population (2022)
  - Total: 5,316
  - Density: 1,190/km^{2} (3,090/sq mi)
- Time zone: UTC+6 (Bangladesh Time)

Sholak or Solak is a village in Wazirpur Upazila of Barisal District in the Barisal Division of southern-central Bangladesh.

According to the 2022 Census of Bangladesh, Sholak had 1,305 households and a population of 5,316. It has a total area of 4.46 km^{2} (1.72 sq mi).
