= Alaylı, Aksu =

Alaylı
- Neighbourhood
- Location in Turkey
- Coordinates: 37°03′19″N 30°53′29″E
- Country: Turkey
- Province: Antalya
- District: Aksu
- Population (2022): 1,237
- Time zone: UTC+3 (TRT)

Alaylı is a neighbourhood of the municipality and district of Aksu, Antalya Province, Turkey. Its population is 1,237 (2022).
