= José Pinto (Honduran footballer) =

Honduran footballer (born 1997)

Personal information
- Full name: José Mario Pinto Paz
- Date of birth: 27 September 1997 (age 29)
- Place of birth: Tegucigalpa, Honduras
- Height: 1.72 m (5 ft 8 in)
- Position: Winger

Team information
- Current team: Sporting
- Number: 7

Youth career
- Olimpia

Senior career*
Years	Team	Apps	(Gls)
2018–2026	Olimpia	262	(48)
2018–2019	→ UPNFM (loan)	30	(4)
2026–	Sporting	2	(0)

International career^{‡}
2017	Honduras U20	4	(0)
2019–2021	Honduras U23	10	(0)
2021–	Honduras	21	(3)
- * Club domestic league appearances and goals as of 2 August 2026 ‡ National team caps and goals as of 20 November 2024

José Mario Pinto Paz (born 27 September 1997) is a Honduran professional footballer who plays as a winger for Liga FPD club Sporting San José and the Honduras national team.

== International career ==
He made his debut for the Honduras national football team on 13 October 2021 in a World Cup qualifier against Jamaica.

International Goals
No.	Date	Venue	Opponent	Score	Result	Competition
1	3 June 2022	Ergilio Hato Stadium, Willemstad, Curaçao	Curaçao	1–0	1–0	2022–23 CONCACAF Nations League A
2	2 July 2023	Bank of America Stadium, Charlotte, United States	Haiti	2–1	2–1	2023 CONCACAF Gold Cup
