= Mostafa Meshaal (footballer) =

Qatari footballer (born 2001)

Mostafa Tarek
Personal information
- Full name: Mostafa Tarek Meshaal
- Date of birth: 28 March 2001 (age 25)
- Place of birth: Doha, Qatar
- Height: 1.74 m (5 ft 9 in)
- Position: Midfielder

Team information
- Current team: Al-Sadd
- Number: 14

Senior career*
Years	Team	Apps	(Gls)
2019–	Al-Sadd	50	(5)
2023	→ Al-Shamal (loan)	6	(1)
2026	→ Eupen (loan)	3	(0)

International career^{‡}
2021–2024	Qatar U23	20	(2)
2022–	Qatar	21	(2)
Medal record
Representing Qatar
Men's Football
AFC Asian Cup
Winner	2023 Qatar
- * Club domestic league appearances and goals as of 10 September 2026 ‡ National team caps and goals as of 6 June 2024

Mostafa Tarek Meshaal (Arabic: مُصْطَفَى طَارِق مَشْعَل; born 28 March 2001) is a Qatari professional footballer who plays as a midfielder for Al-Sadd and the Qatar national team.

== Club career ==
Meshaal began his professional career with Al-Sadd SC in 2019. In February 2023, he joined Al-Shamal SC. On 21 January 2026, he signed with Eupen of Belgium's Challenger Pro League.

== Honours ==
Al-Sadd

- Qatar Stars League: 2018–19, 2020–21, 2021–22
- Emir of Qatar Cup: 2020, 2021
- Sheikh Jassim Cup: 2019
- Qatari Stars Cup: 2019–20
- Qatar Cup: 2020, 2021

Qatar

- AFC Asian Cup: 2023
