= Tameem Al-Abdullah =

Qatari footballer (born 2002)

Personal information
- Full name: Tameem Mansour Muftah Al-Abdullah
- Date of birth: 5 October 2002 (age 24)
- Place of birth: Doha, Qatar
- Height: 1.86 m (6 ft 1 in)
- Positions: Forward; winger

Team information
- Current team: Al Rayyan
- Number: 15

Youth career
- Al Rayyan Academy
- –2020: Al-Rayyan U23

Senior career*
Years	Team	Apps	(Gls)
2021–	Al Rayyan		

International career^{‡}
2023	Qatar U23	6	(3)
2023–	Qatar	10	(3)
- * Club domestic league appearances and goals as of 16 September 2023 ‡ National team caps and goals as of 21 November 2023

Tameem Mansour Al-Abdullah (born 5 October 2002), alternatively and commonly spelled as, Tamim Mansour, is a Qatari professional footballer who plays as a forward for Qatar Stars League club, Al Rayyan, as well as representing the Qatar national team on the international stage.

== Club career ==
Tameem was promoted to the senior squad of Al-Rayyan in 2021, after being an academy prodigy in the Al-Rayyan academy.

== International career ==
In 2023, Tameem was selected to play for Qatar for the 2023 Gulf Cup, He scored his first international goal against UAE in the 2023 Gulf Cup. In June 2023, He played at the 2023 CONCACAF Gold Cup, where he scored in the group stage against Honduras. Later the same year, Tameem was also present with the team for the 2026 FIFA World Cup qualification, where he scored a goal against Afghanistan in a 8–1 victory.

== Personal life ==
Tameem's father, Mansour Muftah, was also a former professional footballer, who also played for Al-Rayyan, he is regarded as one of the greatest Gulf footballers ever.

== Career statistics ==
=== Club ===
Club	League			Cup		AFC Champions League		Supercup		Total	
Club	Season	Games	Goals	Games	Goals	Games	Goals	Games	Goals	Games	Goals
Al-Rayyan B	2020–21	19	9	0	0	0	0	0	0	19	9
Al-Rayyan B	2021–22	10	3	0	0	0	0	0	0	10	3
Al-Rayyan B	2022–23	4	2	0	0	0	0	0	0	4	2
Total		33	14	0	0	0	0	0	0	33	14
Al-Rayyan	2020–21	1	0	4	0	1	0	1	0	7	0
Al-Rayyan	2021–22	10	1	7	0	5	1	0	0	22	2
Al-Rayyan	2022–23	17	1	3	1	–	–	0	0	20	2
Al-Rayyan	2023–24	3	0	0	0	–	–	0	0	3	0
Total		31	2	14	1	6	1	1	0	52	4
Career Total		64	16	14	1	6	1	1	0	85	18

=== International ===
Scores and results list Qatar's goal tally first.

No.	Date	Venue	Opponent	Score	Result	Competition
1.	13 January 2023	Al-Minaa Olympic Stadium, Basra, Iraq	United Arab Emirates	1–1	1–1	25th Arabian Gulf Cup
2.	29 June 2023	State Farm Stadium, Glendale, United States	Honduras	1–0	1–1	2023 CONCACAF Gold Cup
3.	16 November 2023	Khalifa International Stadium, Doha, Qatar	Afghanistan	8–1	8–1	2026 FIFA World Cup qualification
