= Kurşunlu Waterfall Nature Park =

Waterfall in Antalya, Turkey

- Kurşunlu Şelalesi Tabşat Parkı
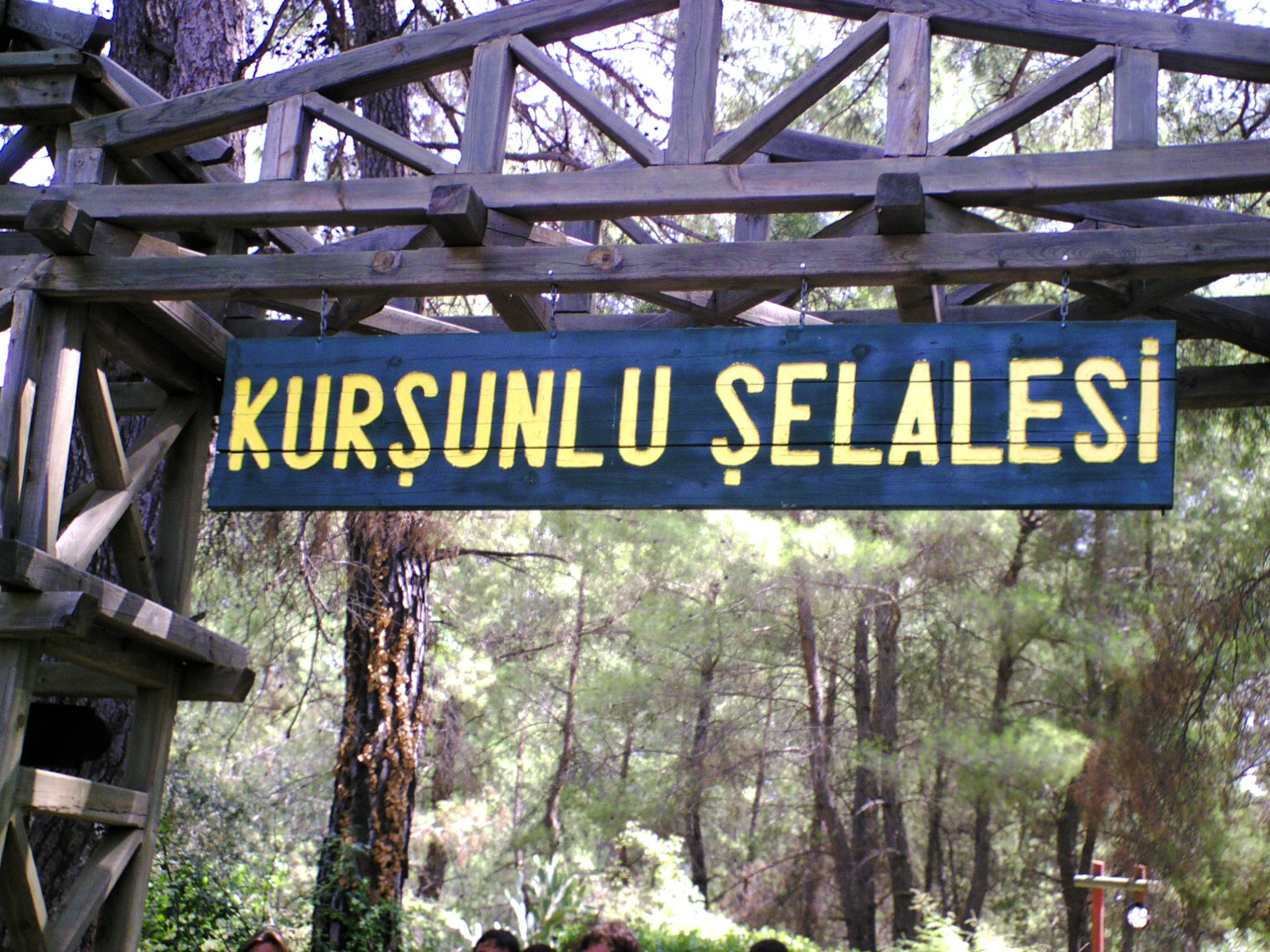
- Entrance of the waterfall.

- Location within Turkey
- Location: Antalya, Turkey
- Nearest city: Antalya
- Coordinates: 37.003°N 30.821°E
- Area: 586.5 ha (1,449 acres)
- Established: May 21, 1991; 35 years ago
- Governing body: Directorate-General of Nature Protection and National Parks; Ministry of Environment and Forest

The Kurşunlu Waterfall (Turkish: Kurşunlu Şelalesi) is located 19 km from Antalya, Turkey at the end of a 7 km road branching off to the north of the Antalya-Serik-Alanya highway at a point 12 km east of Antalya. It is reduced to a mere trickle in the summer months.

The waterfall is on one of the tributaries of the Aksu River, where the tributary drops from Antalya's plateau to the coastal plain. It is situated in the midst of a pine forest of exceptional beauty. The environs provide a picnic and pleasure spot about twenty minutes by car from the centre of the city of Antalya.

The waterfall and its surroundings covering an area of 586.5 ha (1,449 acres) were declared a nature park by the Ministry of Environment and Forest on May 21, 1991.

All year round, safari tours with all-terrain vehicles are organized near the waterfall.

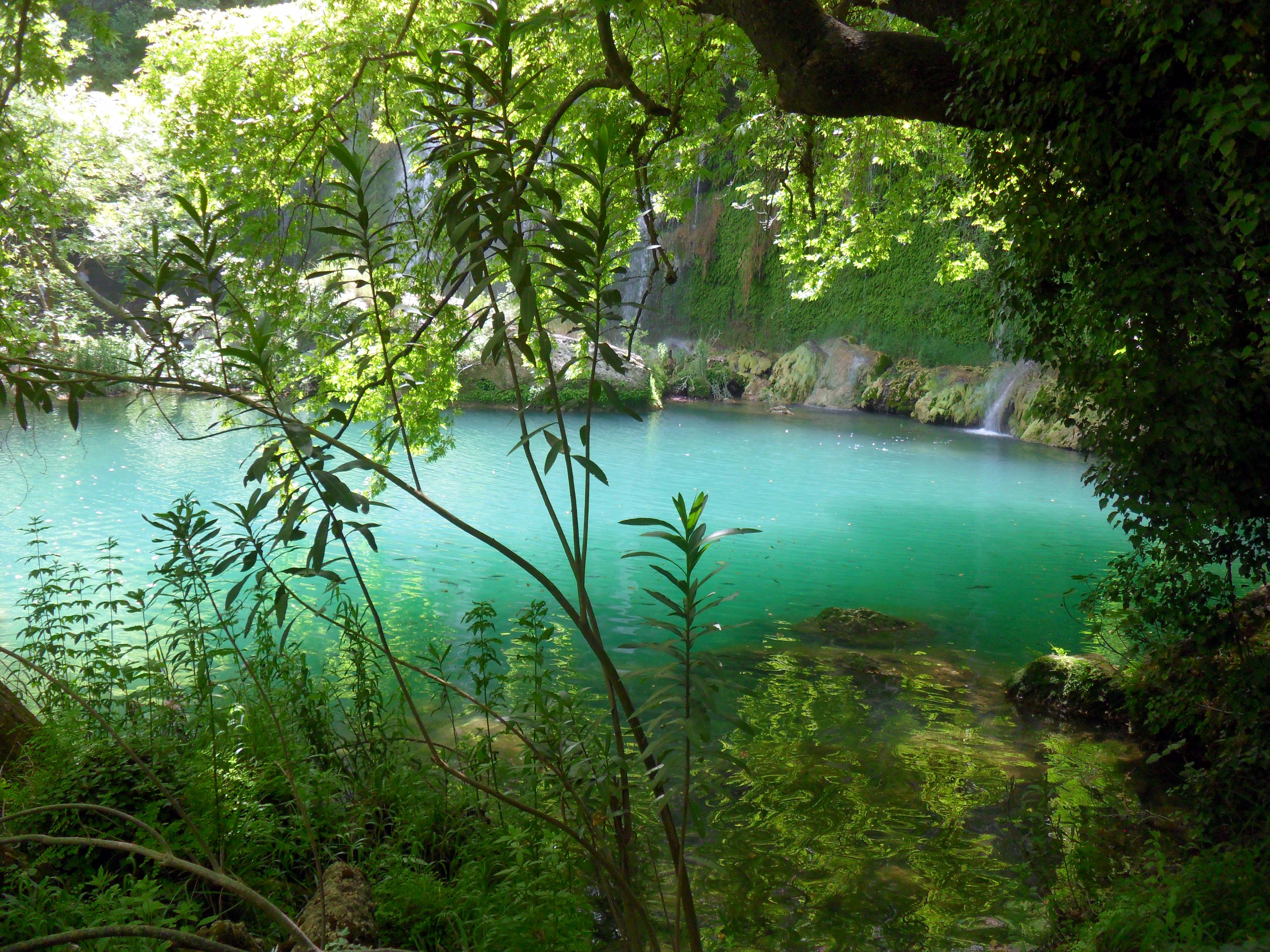
From Kuşunlu Waterfall

== See also ==
- List of waterfalls
- List of waterfalls in Turkey
