= 2023 CONCACAF Gold Cup Group C =

Football competition

Group C of the 2023 CONCACAF Gold Cup took place from June 26 to July 4, 2023. The group consisted of Costa Rica, Panama, and El Salvador. A fourth team (Martinque) entered the group via the Gold Cup qualification tournament. The top two teams, Panama and Costa Rica, advanced to the quarter-finals, while the other two teams were eliminated.

== Standings ==
| Pos | Team | Pld | W | D | L | GF | GA | GD | Pts | Qualification |
|---|---|---|---|---|---|---|---|---|---|---|
| 1 | Panama | 3 | 2 | 1 | 0 | 6 | 4 | +2 | 7 | Advance to knockout stage |
| 2 | Costa Rica | 3 | 1 | 1 | 1 | 7 | 6 | +1 | 4 | Advance to knockout stage |
| 3 | Martinique | 3 | 1 | 0 | 2 | 7 | 9 | −2 | 3 | |
| 4 | El Salvador | 3 | 0 | 2 | 1 | 3 | 4 | −1 | 2 | |

Source: CONCACAF
Rules for classification: Tiebreakers

In the quarter-finals:

- The winners of Group C, Panama, advanced to play the runners-up of Group B, Qatar.
- The runners-up of Group C, Costa Rica, advanced to play the winners of Group B, Mexico.

== Matches ==
=== El Salvador vs Martinique ===
The two teams had met only once at the Gold Cup, a group stage match at the 2003 CONCACAF Gold Cup, won by El Salvador 1–0. This had also been the only previous meeting between the two teams, considering that Martinique was not a FIFA member.

June 26, 2023
18:30

| El Salvador | 1–2 | Martinique |
|---|---|---|
| Tamacas 90+5' (pen.) | Report | Burner 11'; Fortuné 16' |

DRV PNK Stadium, Fort Lauderdale
Attendance: 10,101
Referee: Adonai Escobedo (Mexico)

| El Salvador | Martinique |

| GK | 18 | Tomas Romero |
| RB | 21 | Bryan Tamacas (c) |
| CB | 4 | Eriq Zavaleta |
| CB | 2 | Erick Cabalceta |
| LB | 15 | Alex Roldán |
| CM | 14 | Christian Martínez | (substituted off) 46' |
| CM | 8 | Brayan Landaverde |
| RW | 19 | Kevin Reyes | (substituted off) 46' |
| AM | 16 | Harold Osorio | (substituted off) 46' |
| LW | 13 | Leonardo Menjívar | (substituted off) 63' |
| CF | 9 | Brayan Gil | (substituted off) 75' |
Substitutions:
| MF | 6 | Narciso Orellana | (substituted on) 46' |
| MF | 17 | Jairo Henríquez | (substituted on) 46' |
| FW | 7 | Joshua Pérez | (substituted on) 46' |
| FW | 10 | Mayer Gil | (substituted on) 63' |
| FW | 11 | Cristian Gil | (substituted on) 75' |
Manager:
(United States) Hugo Pérez

| GK | 16 | Yannis Clementia |
| RB | 7 | Ronny Labonne |
| CB | 22 | Florent Poulolo | (yellow card) 82' |
| CB | 18 | Jonathan Rivierez | (red card) 48' |
| LB | 15 | Patrick Burner | | (substituted off) 74' |
| RM | 17 | Karl Fabien | (yellow card) 29' | (substituted off) 56' |
| CM | 14 | Cyril Mandouki |
| CM | 19 | Daniel Hérelle (c) | | (substituted off) 67' |
| LM | 21 | Florian Lapis |
| CF | 13 | Kévin Fortuné | | (substituted off) 46' |
| CF | 10 | Brighton Labeau | | (substituted off) 75' |
Substitutions:
| MF | 6 | Jonathan Mexique | | (substituted on) 46' |
| DF | 5 | Jean-Claude Michalet | | (substituted on) 56' |
| MF | 11 | Thomas Ephestion | | (substituted on) 67' |
| FW | 12 | Enrick Reuperné | | (substituted on) 74' |
| DF | 8 | Andy Marny | | (substituted on) 75' |
Manager:
Marc Collat

Man of the Match:
Yannis Clementia (Martinique)

Assistant referees:
Christian Espinosa (Mexico)
Karen Díaz (Mexico)
Fourth official:
Randy Encarnación (Dominican Republic)
Video assistant referee:
Guillermo Pacheco (Mexico)
Assistant video assistant referee:
Luis Enrique Santander (Mexico)

=== Costa Rica vs Panama ===
The two teams had faced each other 51 times previously, but only once in the Gold Cup: a 1–0 quarter-final victory for Costa Rica in 2017. Their most recent meeting had been in the 2022–23 CONCACAF Nations League A, won 2–1 by Panama.

June 26, 2023
20:30

| Costa Rica | 1–2 | Panama |
|---|---|---|
| Suárez 90+1' | Report | Fajardo 23'; Bárcenas 68' |

DRV PNK Stadium, Fort Lauderdale
Attendance: 10,101
Referee: Drew Fischer (Canada)

| Costa Rica | Panama |

| GK | 18 | Kevin Chamorro |
| CB | 19 | Kendall Waston |
| CB | 3 | Juan Pablo Vargas |
| CB | 15 | Francisco Calvo |
| RWB | 22 | Jefry Valverde |
| LWB | 13 | Suhander Zúñiga | | (substituted off) 46' |
| RM | 7 | Anthony Contreras | | (substituted off) 59' |
| CM | 5 | Celso Borges (c) | | (substituted off) 72' |
| CM | 14 | Ricardo Peña | | (substituted off) 59' |
| LM | 8 | Josimar Alcócer | (yellow card) 15' | (substituted off) 73' |
| CF | 12 | Joel Campbell |
Substitutions:
| MF | 11 | Aarón Suárez | | (substituted on) 46' |
| MF | 17 | Carlos Mora | | (substituted on) 59' |
| MF | 20 | Wilmer Azofeifa | (yellow card) 85' | (substituted on) 59' |
| MF | 16 | Warren Madrigal | | (substituted on) 72' |
| MF | 10 | Cristopher Núñez | | (substituted on) 73' |
Manager:
(Colombia) Luis Fernando Suárez

| GK | 22 | Orlando Mosquera |
| CB | 4 | Fidel Escobar |
| CB | 3 | Harold Cummings |
| CB | 16 | Andrés Andrade |
| RWB | 23 | Michael Amir Murillo |
| LWB | 15 | Eric Davis | | (substituted off) 85' |
| RM | 17 | José Fajardo | | (substituted off) 75' |
| CM | 8 | Adalberto Carrasquilla |
| CM | 20 | Aníbal Godoy (c) | (yellow card) 44' | (substituted off) 75' |
| LM | 11 | Ismael Díaz | | (substituted off) 62' |
| CF | 10 | Yoel Bárcenas | | (substituted off) 75' |
Substitutions:
| MF | 19 | Alberto Quintero | | (substituted on) 62' |
| MF | 6 | Cristian Martínez | | (substituted on) 75' |
| FW | 18 | Cecilio Waterman | | (substituted on) 75' |
| DF | 2 | César Blackman | | (substituted on) 75' |
| MF | 13 | Freddy Góndola | | (substituted on) 85' |
Manager:
(Spain) Thomas Christiansen

Man of the Match:
Yoel Bárcenas (Panama)

Assistant referees:
Kathryn Nesbitt (United States)
Micheal Barwegen (Canada)
Fourth official:
Joe Dickerson (United States)
Video assistant referee:
Edvin Jurisevic (United States)
Assistant video assistant referee:
Chris Penso (United States)

=== Martinique vs Panama ===
The two teams had met four times previously, including two Gold Cup group stage matches, both won by Panama; 1–0 in 2013 and 3–0 in 2017. The other two games were played in the CONCACAF Nations League A in 2022 with a 5–0 home win for Panama and a 0–0 draw in Martinique.

June 30, 2023
18:30

| Martinique | 1–2 | Panama |
|---|---|---|
| Fabien 90+5' | Report | Fajardo 57'; Murillo 69' |

Red Bull Arena, Harrison
Attendance: 22,615
Referee: Saíd Martínez (Honduras)

| Martinique | Panama |

| GK | 1 | Théo De Percin |
| RB | 11 | Thomas Ephestion | | (substituted off) 65' |
| CB | 22 | Florent Poulolo |
| CB | 5 | Jean-Claude Michalet |
| LB | 2 | Yordan Thimon | | (substituted off) 65' |
| RM | 12 | Enrick Reuperné | (yellow card) 18' | (substituted off) 71' |
| CM | 20 | Ghislain Arbaut | | (substituted off) 75' |
| CM | 6 | Jonathan Mexique |
| LM | 21 | Florian Lapis |
| SS | 8 | Andy Marny |
| CF | 10 | Brighton Labeau (c) | | (substituted off) 74' |
Substitutions:
| DF | 7 | Ronny Labonne | | (substituted on) 65' |
| DF | 15 | Patrick Burner | | (substituted on) 65' |
| FW | 17 | Karl Fabien | | (substituted on) 71' |
| FW | 13 | Kévin Fortuné | | (substituted on) 74' |
| MF | 14 | Cyril Mandouki | | (substituted on) 75' |
Manager:
Marc Collat

| GK | 22 | Orlando Mosquera |
| CB | 4 | Fidel Escobar |
| CB | 3 | Harold Cummings |
| CB | 16 | Andrés Andrade | | (substituted off) 82' |
| RWB | 23 | Michael Amir Murillo |
| LWB | 15 | Eric Davis | | (substituted off) 74' |
| RM | 17 | José Fajardo | | (substituted off) 82' |
| CM | 8 | Adalberto Carrasquilla |
| CM | 20 | Aníbal Godoy (c) | (yellow card) 80' | (substituted off) 82' |
| LM | 10 | Yoel Bárcenas |
| CF | 19 | Alberto Quintero | | (substituted off) 74' |
Substitutions:
| MF | 21 | César Yanis | | (substituted on) 74' |
| FW | 11 | Ismael Díaz | | (substituted on) 74' |
| DF | 5 | Roderick Miller | | (substituted on) 82' |
| MF | 7 | Jovani Welch | | (substituted on) 82' |
| FW | 18 | Cecilio Waterman | | (substituted on) 82' |
Manager:
(Spain) Thomas Christiansen

Man of the Match:
Michael Amir Murillo (Panama)

Assistant referees:
Walter López (Honduras)
Christian Ramírez (Honduras)
Fourth official:
Bryan López (Guatemala)
Video assistant referee:
Tatiana Guzmán (Nicaragua)
Assistant video assistant referee:
Guillermo Pacheco (Mexico)

=== El Salvador vs Costa Rica ===
The two teams had faced each other in 59 previous matches, including four Gold Cup games: a Costa Rica's 5–2 quarter-finals victory in 2003, an El Salvador's 2–1 group stage victory in 2009 and two 1–1 group stage draws in 2011 and 2015. Their most recent meeting had been in the 2022 FIFA World Cup qualification, won 2–1 by Costa Rica.

June 30, 2023
20:30

| El Salvador | 0–0 | Costa Rica |
|---|---|---|
| | Report |

Red Bull Arena, Harrison
Attendance: 22,615
Referee: César Ramos (Mexico)

| El Salvador | Costa Rica |

| GK | 1 | Mario González |
| RB | 21 | Bryan Tamacas (c) |
| CB | 4 | Eriq Zavaleta | | (substituted off) 72' |
| CB | 2 | Erick Cabalceta |
| LB | 15 | Alex Roldán |
| RM | 17 | Jairo Henríquez | | (substituted off) 82' |
| CM | 6 | Narciso Orellana | (yellow card) 77' | (substituted off) 82' |
| CM | 8 | Brayan Landaverde |
| LM | 13 | Leonardo Menjívar | | (substituted off) 82' |
| CF | 7 | Joshua Pérez |
| CF | 9 | Brayan Gil | | (substituted off) 90' |
Substitutions:
| DF | 3 | Roberto Domínguez | | (substituted on) 72' |
| FW | 19 | Kevin Reyes | | (substituted on) 82' |
| FW | 10 | Mayer Gil | | (substituted on) 82' |
| MF | 14 | Christian Martínez | | (substituted on) 82' |
| FW | 11 | Cristian Gil | | (substituted on) 90' |
Manager:
(United States) Hugo Pérez

| GK | 18 | Kevin Chamorro |
| RB | 22 | Jefry Valverde |
| CB | 19 | Kendall Waston |
| CB | 3 | Juan Pablo Vargas | (yellow card) 58' |
| LB | 15 | Francisco Calvo |
| DM | 5 | Celso Borges (c) |
| RM | 17 | Carlos Mora | | (substituted off) 46' |
| CM | 11 | Aarón Suárez | | (substituted off) 64' |
| CM | 10 | Cristopher Núñez | (yellow card) 47' | (substituted off) 73' |
| LM | 8 | Josimar Alcócer |
| CF | 12 | Joel Campbell |
Substitutions:
| MF | 16 | Warren Madrigal | | (substituted on) 46' (substituted off) 89' |
| MF | 20 | Wilmer Azofeifa | | (substituted on) 64' |
| FW | 7 | Anthony Contreras | | (substituted on) 73' |
| DF | 6 | Pablo Arboine | | (substituted on) 89' |
Manager:
(Colombia) Luis Fernando Suárez

Man of the Match:
Mario González (El Salvador)

Assistant referees:
Alberto Morín (Mexico)
Marco Bisguerra (Mexico)
Fourth official:
Randy Encarnación (Dominican Republic)
Video assistant referee:
Erick Miranda (Mexico)
Assistant video assistant referee:
Jorge Pérez Durán (Mexico)

=== Costa Rica vs Martinique ===
The two teams had met four times previously, including two Gold Cup group stage matches, both won by Costa Rica; 3–1 in 1993 and 2–0 in 2002. The other two games were played in the CONCACAF Nations League A in 2022 with Costa Rica also winning both games, 2–0 at home and a 2–1 in Martinique.

With a total of ten goals, this match set the record for the highest-scoring match in Gold Cup history. The previous record was held by two matches which both had nine goals, and also involved Costa Rica and Martinique: Mexico 9–0 Martinique in 1993, and Costa Rica 7–2 Cuba in 1998.

July 4, 2023
20:30

| Costa Rica | 6–4 | Martinique |
|---|---|---|
| Waston 9'; Calvo 40'; Vargas 53'; Campbell 58' (pen.); Contreras 68'; Campos 89' | Report | Burner 18', 78'; Labeau 74' (pen.); Mexique 90+2' |

Red Bull Arena, Harrison
Attendance: 21,531
Referee: Bryan López (Guatemala)

| Costa Rica | Martinique |

| GK | 18 | Kevin Chamorro |
| RB | 22 | Jefry Valverde | (yellow card) 73' | (substituted off) 82' |
| CB | 19 | Kendall Waston | (yellow card) 44' |
| CB | 3 | Juan Pablo Vargas |
| LB | 15 | Francisco Calvo |
| DM | 5 | Celso Borges (c) |
| RM | 12 | Joel Campbell |
| CM | 20 | Wilmer Azofeifa | | (substituted off) 75' |
| CM | 10 | Cristopher Núñez | | (substituted off) 75' |
| LM | 8 | Josimar Alcócer | | (substituted off) 63' |
| CF | 7 | Anthony Contreras | | (substituted off) 82' |
Substitutions:
| DF | 13 | Suhander Zúñiga | | (substituted on) 63' |
| FW | 9 | Diego Campos | | (substituted on) 75' |
| MF | 21 | Roan Wilson | (yellow card) 80' | (substituted on) 75' |
| MF | 16 | Warren Madrigal | | (substituted on) 82' |
| DF | 6 | Pablo Arboine | | (substituted on) 82' |
Manager:
(Colombia) Luis Fernando Suárez

| GK | 16 | Yannis Clementia | (yellow card) 57' |
| RB | 7 | Ronny Labonne |
| CB | 22 | Florent Poulolo |
| CB | 18 | Jonathan Rivierez | | (substituted off) 85' |
| LB | 15 | Patrick Burner |
| RM | 17 | Karl Fabien | | (substituted off) 72' |
| CM | 14 | Cyril Mandouki |
| CM | 19 | Daniel Hérelle (c) | (yellow card) 47' | (substituted off) 60' |
| LM | 21 | Florian Lapis |
| CF | 13 | Kévin Fortuné | | (substituted off) 60' |
| CF | 10 | Brighton Labeau |
Substitutions:
| MF | 6 | Jonathan Mexique | | (substituted on) 60' |
| FW | 12 | Enrick Reuperné | | (substituted on) 60' |
| MF | 20 | Ghislain Arbaut | | (substituted on) 72' |
| DF | 8 | Andy Marny | (yellow card) 87' | (substituted on) 85' |
Manager:
Marc Collat

Man of the Match:
Kendall Waston (Costa Rica)

Assistant referees:
Corey Parker (United States)
Kyle Atkins (United States)
Fourth official:
Armando Villarreal (United States)
Video assistant referee:
Luis Enrique Santander (Mexico)
Assistant video assistant referee:
Erick Miranda (Mexico)

=== Panama vs El Salvador ===
The two teams had faced each other 48 times previously, but only once in the Gold Cup: a 5–3 quarter-finals victory on penalties for Panama in 2011 following a 1–1 draw after extra time. Their most recent meeting was in the 2022 FIFA World Cup qualification phase, won 2–1 by Panama.

July 4, 2023
20:30 (19:30 UTC-5)

| Panama | 2–2 | El Salvador |
|---|---|---|
| Escobar 26'; Díaz 71' | Report | B. Gil 4'; M. Gil 90+1' |

Shell Energy Stadium, Houston
Attendance: 20,002
Referee: Walter López (Guatemala)

| Panama | El Salvador |

| GK | 22 | Orlando Mosquera |
| CB | 4 | Fidel Escobar |
| CB | 3 | Harold Cummings (c) | | (substituted off) 46' |
| CB | 5 | Roderick Miller | | (substituted off) 84' |
| RWB | 2 | César Blackman |
| LWB | 10 | Yoel Bárcenas | | (substituted off) 74' |
| RM | 11 | Ismael Díaz |
| CM | 6 | Cristian Martínez | (yellow card) 37' | (substituted off) 46' |
| CM | 7 | Jovani Welch |
| LM | 13 | Freddy Góndola | | (substituted off) 68' |
| CF | 18 | Cecilio Waterman |
Substitutions:
| MF | 8 | Adalberto Carrasquilla | (yellow card) 49' | (substituted on) 46' |
| DF | 16 | Andrés Andrade | | (substituted on) 46' |
| MF | 21 | César Yanis | | (substituted on) 68' |
| DF | 14 | Eduardo Anderson | | (substituted on) 74' |
| FW | 9 | Azarías Londoño | (yellow card) 90+4' | (substituted on) 84' |
Manager:
(Spain) Thomas Christiansen

| GK | 1 | Mario González (c) |
| RB | 21 | Bryan Tamacas |
| CB | 2 | Erick Cabalceta |
| CB | 3 | Roberto Domínguez |
| LB | 15 | Alex Roldán |
| RM | 17 | Jairo Henríquez | | (substituted off) 77' |
| CM | 8 | Brayan Landaverde | | (substituted off) 68' |
| CM | 6 | Narciso Orellana | (yellow card) 85' |
| LM | 13 | Leonardo Menjívar | | (substituted off) 68' |
| CF | 9 | Brayan Gil | | (substituted off) 84' |
| CF | 7 | Joshua Pérez | | (substituted off) 46' |
Substitutions:
| MF | 14 | Christian Martínez | | (substituted on) 46' |
| MF | 16 | Harold Osorio | | (substituted on) 68' |
| FW | 10 | Mayer Gil | | (substituted on) 68' |
| DF | 20 | Nelson Blanco | | (substituted on) 77' |
| FW | 11 | Cristian Gil | | (substituted on) 84' |
Manager:
(United States) Hugo Pérez

Man of the Match:
Ismael Díaz (Panama)

Assistant referees:
Keytzel Corrales (Nicaragua)
Raymundo Feliz (Dominican Republic)
Fourth official:
Reon Radix (Grenada)
Video assistant referee:
Guillermo Pacheco (Mexico)
Assistant video assistant referee:
Selvin Brown (Honduras)
