= 2023 CONCACAF Gold Cup knockout stage =

Stage of the football championship competition

The knockout stage of the 2023 CONCACAF Gold Cup was the second and final stage of the competition, following the group stage. Played from July 8 to 16, the knockout stage ended with the final, held at SoFi Stadium in Inglewood, California, in the Los Angeles area. The top two teams from each group advanced to the knockout stage to compete in a single-elimination tournament. There were seven matches in the knockout stage.

== Format ==
The knockout stage of the 2023 CONCACAF Gold Cup was contested between the eight teams that qualified from the group stage. Matches in the knockout stage were played to a finish. If the score of a match was level at the end of 90 minutes of playing time, extra time was played. If, after two periods of 15 minutes, the scores were still tied, the match was decided by a penalty shoot-out. All times listed are local in Eastern Time Zone (UTC−4).

== Qualified teams ==
The top two placed teams from each of the four groups qualified for the knockout stage.

Group	Winners	Runners-up
A	United States	Jamaica
B	Mexico	Qatar
C	Panama	Costa Rica
D	Guatemala	Canada

== Bracket ==
The tournament bracket is shown below, with bold denoting the winners of each match.

Quarter-finals
July 9 – Cincinnati
Guatemala	0
**Jamaica**	**1**
July 8 – Arlington
**Mexico**	**2**
Costa Rica	0
July 9 – Cincinnati
**United States (p)**	**2 (3)**
Canada	2 (2)
July 8 – Arlington
**Panama**	**4**
Qatar	0

Semi-finals
July 12 – Paradise
Jamaica	0
**Mexico**	**3**
July 12 – San Diego
United States	1 (4)
**Panama (p)**	**1 (5)**

Final
July 16 – Inglewood
**Mexico**	**1**
Panama	0

== Quarter-finals ==
=== Panama vs Qatar ===
The two teams had met previously only once, a group stage match in the previous edition of the Gold Cup in 2021, which ended in a 3–3 draw.

July 8, 2023
19:00 (18:00 UTC−5)

Panama	4–0	Qatar
Bárcenas 19'; Díaz 56', 63', 65'	Report

AT&T Stadium, Arlington
Attendance: 60,355
Referee: César Ramos (Mexico)

**Panama**	**Qatar**

GK	22	Orlando Mosquera
CB	4	Fidel Escobar
CB	3	Harold Cummings	(substituted off) 85'
CB	16	Andrés Andrade
RWB	10	Yoel Bárcenas
LWB	15	Eric Davis
RM	17	José Fajardo
CM	8	Adalberto Carrasquilla	(substituted off) 70'
CM	20	Aníbal Godoy (c)	(substituted off) 82'
LM	11	Ismael Díaz	(substituted off) 70'
CF	19	Alberto Quintero	(substituted off) 70'
Substitutions:
MF	6	Cristian Martínez	(substituted on) 70'
FW	18	Cecilio Waterman	(substituted on) 70'
MF	21	César Yanis	(substituted on) 70'
MF	7	Jovani Welch	(substituted on) 82'
DF	5	Roderick Miller	(substituted on) 85'
Manager:
(Spain) Thomas Christiansen

GK	1	Salah Zakaria
RB	15	Bassam Al-Rawi
CB	2	Ahmed Suhail
CB	4	Yousef Ayman
LB	14	Homam Ahmed
DM	23	Assim Madibo	(substituted off) 67'
RM	13	Musab Kheder
CM	8	Ali Assadalla (c)	(substituted off) 67'
CM	16	Mostafa Meshaal
LM	3	Hazem Shehata	(substituted off) 46'
CF	19	Almoez Ali	(substituted off) 82'
Substitutions:
MF	7	Mahdi Salem	(substituted on) 46'
DF	20	Jassem Gaber	(substituted on) 67'
MF	12	Abdullah Marafee	(substituted on) 67'
FW	18	Khalid Muneer	(substituted on) 82'
Manager:
(Portugal) Carlos Queiroz

Man of the Match:
Ismael Díaz (Panama)

Assistant referees:
Alberto Morín (Mexico)
Marco Bisguerra (Mexico)
Fourth official:
Fernando Guerrero (Mexico)
Video assistant referee:
Erick Miranda (Mexico)
Assistant video assistant referee:
Guillermo Pacheco (Mexico)

=== Mexico vs Costa Rica ===
The two teams had faced each other in 57 previous matches, including eight times in the Gold Cup with five victories for Mexico and three draws in regular time. Three of these eight previous Gold Cup meetings were also in quarter-finals, with Mexico prevailing in all of them (in 2007, 2015 and 2019).

July 8, 2023
21:30 (20:30 UTC−5)

Mexico	2–0	Costa Rica
Pineda 52' (pen.); É. Sánchez 87'	Report

AT&T Stadium, Arlington
Attendance: 60,355
Referee: Saíd Martínez (Honduras)

**Mexico**	**Costa Rica**

GK	13	Guillermo Ochoa (c)
RB	19	Jorge Sánchez		(substituted off) 84'
CB	3	César Montes
CB	5	Johan Vásquez
LB	23	Jesús Gallardo
CM	7	Luis Romo
CM	4	Edson Álvarez	(yellow card) 55'	(substituted off) 90+1'
CM	18	Luis Chávez		(substituted off) 70'
RF	15	Uriel Antuna
CF	20	Henry Martín		(substituted off) 70'
LF	17	Orbelín Pineda		(substituted off) 84'
Substitutions:
FW	14	Érick Sánchez		(substituted on) 70'
FW	11	Santiago Giménez		(substituted on) 70'
DF	2	Julián Araujo		(substituted on) 84'
FW	10	Roberto Alvarado		(substituted on) 84'
DF	21	Israel Reyes		(substituted on) 90+1'
Interim manager:
Jaime Lozano

GK	18	Kevin Chamorro
RB	22	Jefry Valverde
CB	19	Kendall Waston
CB	3	Juan Pablo Vargas
LB	15	Francisco Calvo	(yellow card) 87'	(substituted off) 82'
DM	5	Celso Borges (c)	(yellow card) 68'
RM	7	Anthony Contreras
CM	20	Wilmer Azofeifa	(yellow card) 12'	(substituted off) 63'
CM	10	Cristopher Núñez		(substituted off) 83'
LM	8	Josimar Alcócer		(substituted off) 83'
CF	12	Joel Campbell
Substitutions:
MF	11	Aarón Suárez		(substituted on) 63'
MF	16	Warren Madrigal		(substituted on) 82'
DF	13	Suhander Zúñiga		(substituted on) 83'
DF	6	Pablo Arboine		(substituted on) 83'
Manager:
(Colombia) Luis Fernando Suárez

Man of the Match:
Orbelín Pineda (Mexico)

Assistant referees:
Walter López (Honduras)
Christian Ramírez (Honduras)
Fourth official:
Randy Encarnación (Dominican Republic)
Video assistant referee:
Chris Penso (United States)
Assistant video assistant referee:
Selvin Brown (Honduras)

=== Guatemala vs Jamaica ===
The two teams had met 14 times previously, including four Gold Cup group stage matches, all won by Jamaica (in 1998, 2003, 2005 and 2011). Their most recent meeting was in the 2014 FIFA World Cup qualification, won by Guatemala 2–1; this was also the nation's only victory against Jamaica.

July 9, 2023
17:00

Guatemala	0–1	Jamaica
	Report	Bell 51'

TQL Stadium, Cincinnati
Attendance: 24,979
Referee: Drew Fischer (Canada)

**Guatemala**	**Jamaica**

GK	1	Nicholas Hagen
RB	7	Aaron Herrera
CB	4	José Carlos Pinto (c)
CB	3	Nicolás Samayoa
LB	2	José Ardón	(yellow card) 77'
CM	17	Óscar Castellanos
CM	15	Marlon Sequen		(substituted off) 64'
RW	18	Nathaniel Mendez-Laing		(substituted off) 82'
AM	5	Pedro Altán		(substituted off) 71'
LW	6	Carlos Mejía		(substituted off) 82'
CF	9	Rubio Rubin
Substitutions:
MF	23	Jorge Aparicio		(substituted on) 64'
MF	13	Alejandro Galindo		(substituted on) 71'
FW	14	Darwin Lom		(substituted on) 82'
MF	10	Antonio López		(substituted on) 82'
Manager:
(Mexico) Luis Fernando Tena

GK	1	Andre Blake (c)
RB	21	Javain Brown		(substituted off) 64'
CB	17	Damion Lowe
CB	6	Di'Shon Bernard	(yellow card) 32'
LB	4	Amari'i Bell
RM	10	Bobby De Cordova-Reid
CM	3	Kevon Lambert	(yellow card) 45+4'	(substituted off) 46'
CM	15	Joel Latibeaudiere
LM	12	Demarai Gray
CF	7	Leon Bailey		(substituted off) 85'
CF	18	Michail Antonio		(substituted off) 78'
Substitutions:
MF	8	Daniel Johnson		(substituted on) 46'
DF	2	Dexter Lembikisa		(substituted on) 64'
FW	11	Shamar Nicholson		(substituted on) 78'
FW	9	Cory Burke	(yellow card) 90+3'	(substituted on) 85'
Manager:
(Iceland) Heimir Hallgrímsson

Man of the Match:
Andre Blake (Jamaica)

Assistant referees:
Micheal Barwegen (Canada)
Caleb Wales (Trinidad and Tobago)
Fourth official:
Joe Dickerson (United States)
Video assistant referee:
Edvin Jurisevic (United States)
Assistant video assistant referee:
Tim Ford (United States)

=== United States vs Canada ===
The two teams had faced each other in 39 previous matches, including five times in the Gold Cup, with the United States prevailing in all five: two semi-finals victories in 2002 and 2007, and three group stage wins in 2005, 2011 and 2021. Their most recent meeting had been the final of the 2022–23 CONCACAF Nations League, won by the United States 2–0.

July 9, 2023
19:30

United States	2–2 (a.e.t.)	Canada
Vázquez 88'; Kennedy 114' (o.g.)	Report	Vitória 90+3' (pen.); Shaffelburg 109'
Penalties
Vázquez (penalty missed); Cowell (penalty scored); Busio (penalty scored); Ferreira (penalty scored)	3–2	(penalty missed) Vitória; (penalty missed) Fraser; (penalty scored) Miller; (penalty scored) Russell-Rowe; (penalty missed) Brym

TQL Stadium, Cincinnati
Attendance: 24,979
Referee: Marco Ortíz (Mexico)

**United States**	**Canada**

GK	1	Matt Turner (c)
RB	5	Bryan Reynolds		(substituted off) 113'
CB	12	Miles Robinson		(substituted off) 93'
CB	20	Jalen Neal		(substituted off) 73'
LB	15	DeJuan Jones
CM	6	Gianluca Busio
CM	8	James Sands
CM	14	Djordje Mihailovic		(substituted off) 73'
RF	22	Julian Gressel		(substituted off) 93'
CF	9	Jesús Ferreira
LF	17	Alejandro Zendejas		(substituted off) 63'
Substitutions:
FW	11	Cade Cowell	(yellow card) 96'	(substituted on) 63'
FW	19	Brandon Vázquez		(substituted on) 73'
DF	4	Matt Miazga	(yellow card) 120+1'	(substituted on) 73'
FW	13	Jordan Morris		(substituted on) 93'
DF	3	Aaron Long		(substituted on) 93'
MF	10	Cristian Roldan		(substituted on) 113'
Interim manager:
B. J. Callaghan

GK	1	Dayne St. Clair
CB	15	Zac McGraw	(yellow card) 57'	(substituted off) 91'
CB	5	Steven Vitória
CB	4	Kamal Miller	(yellow card) 58'
RWB	22	Richie Laryea
LWB	11	Liam Millar		(substituted off) 86'
CM	20	Ali Ahmed		(substituted off) 73'
CM	14	Moïse Bombito		(substituted off) 60'
CM	21	Jonathan Osorio	(yellow card) 62'
CF	9	Lucas Cavallini	(yellow card) 42'	(substituted off) 72'
CF	10	Junior Hoilett (c)		(substituted off) 86'
Substitutions:
MF	3	Liam Fraser		(substituted on) 60'
FW	17	Jacen Russell-Rowe		(substituted on) 72'
MF	8	David Wotherspoon		(substituted on) 73'
FW	13	Jacob Shaffelburg		(substituted on) 86'
FW	19	Charles-Andreas Brym		(substituted on) 86'
DF	23	Scott Kennedy		(substituted on) 91'
Manager:
(England) John Herdman

Man of the Match:
Matt Turner (United States)

Assistant referees:
Christian Espinosa (Mexico) replaced by Caleb Wales (Trinidad and Tobago)
Jorge Sánchez (Mexico)
Fourth official:
Oshane Nation (Jamaica)
Video assistant referee:
Luis Enrique Santander (Mexico)
Assistant video assistant referee:
Ricardo Montero (Costa Rica)

== Semi-finals ==
=== United States vs Panama ===
The two teams had faced each other 25 times previously, eleven of them in the Gold Cup, including two finals, both won by the United States: 3–1 on penalties after a scoreless draw in 2005 and 1–0 in 2013. The other nine matches were played in all other stages of the tournament with five group stage matches (in 1993, 2011, 2015, 2017 and 2019), two in quarter-finals (in 2007 and 2009), one semi-final in 2011 and one third place play-off in 2015. Their most recent meeting was in the 2022 FIFA World Cup qualification, won by the United States 5–1.

This fixture was the twelfth in Gold Cup history between the sides, making it the most frequent matchup in the tournament.

July 12, 2023
19:30 (16:30 UTC−7)

United States	1–1 (a.e.t.)	Panama
Ferreira 105'	Report	I. Anderson 99'
Penalties
Ferreira (penalty missed); Mihailovic (penalty scored); Morris (penalty scored); Gressel (penalty scored); Miazga (penalty scored); Roldan (penalty missed)	4–5	(penalty scored) Escobar; (penalty scored) Díaz; (penalty missed) Martínez; (penalty scored) Bárcenas; (penalty scored) Waterman; (penalty scored) Carrasquilla

Snapdragon Stadium, San Diego
Attendance: 31,690
Referee: Walter López (Guatemala)

**United States**	**Panama**

GK	1	Matt Turner (c)
RB	5	Bryan Reynolds		(substituted off) 63'
CB	12	Miles Robinson	(yellow card) 86'
CB	3	Aaron Long		(substituted off) 74'
LB	15	DeJuan Jones		(substituted off) 104'
CM	6	Gianluca Busio		(substituted off) 104'
CM	8	James Sands
CM	14	Djordje Mihailovic
RF	9	Jesús Ferreira
CF	19	Brandon Vázquez		(substituted off) 74'
LF	11	Cade Cowell		(substituted off) 63'
Substitutions:
DF	2	DeAndre Yedlin		(substituted on) 63'
MF	10	Cristian Roldan		(substituted on) 63'
DF	4	Matt Miazga		(substituted on) 74'
FW	13	Jordan Morris		(substituted on) 74'
FW	22	Julian Gressel		(substituted on) 104'
DF	21	John Tolkin		(substituted on) 104'
Interim manager:
B. J. Callaghan

GK	22	Orlando Mosquera
CB	4	Fidel Escobar
CB	3	Harold Cummings
CB	16	Andrés Andrade
RWB	10	Yoel Bárcenas
LWB	15	Eric Davis		(substituted off) 90+1'
RM	17	José Fajardo		(substituted off) 79'
CM	8	Adalberto Carrasquilla
CM	20	Aníbal Godoy (c)	(yellow card) 101'	(substituted off) 101'
LM	11	Ismael Díaz
CF	19	Alberto Quintero		(substituted off) 79'
Substitutions:
MF	6	Cristian Martínez		(substituted on) 79'
FW	18	Cecilio Waterman		(substituted on) 79'
DF	25	Iván Anderson		(substituted on) 90+1'
MF	7	Jovani Welch		(substituted on) 101'
Manager:
(Spain) Thomas Christiansen

Man of the Match:
Adalberto Carrasquilla (Panama)

Assistant referees:
Keytzel Corrales (Nicaragua)
Raymundo Feliz (Dominican Republic)
Fourth official:
Juan Gabriel Calderón (Costa Rica)
Video assistant referee:
Selvin Brown (Honduras)
Assistant video assistant referee:
Benjamín Pineda (Costa Rica)

=== Jamaica vs Mexico ===
The two teams had met 27 times previously, eight of them in the Gold Cup, including the final won 3–1 by Mexico in 2015. The other seven matches were: three group stage matches (in 1991, 2005 and 2017), one quarter-final match in 2003, and three semi-finals in 1993, 1998 and 2017. Their most recent meeting was a 2–2 draw in the 2022–23 CONCACAF Nations League A in March 2023.

July 12, 2023
22:00 (19:00 UTC−7)

Jamaica	0–3	Mexico
	Report	Martín 2'; Chávez 30'; Alvarado 90+3'

Allegiant Stadium, Paradise
Attendance: 29,886
Referee: Mario Escobar (Guatemala)

**Jamaica**	**Mexico**

GK	1	Andre Blake (c)
RB	21	Javain Brown	(yellow card) 29'	(substituted off) 51'
CB	17	Damion Lowe
CB	6	Di'Shon Bernard	(yellow card) 55'
LB	4	Amari'i Bell
RM	10	Bobby De Cordova-Reid
CM	3	Kevon Lambert	(yellow card) 39'	(substituted off) 46'
CM	15	Joel Latibeaudiere		(substituted off) 84'
LM	12	Demarai Gray
CF	7	Leon Bailey
CF	18	Michail Antonio		(substituted off) 84'
Substitutions:
FW	11	Shamar Nicholson		(substituted on) 46'
DF	2	Dexter Lembikisa		(substituted on) 51'
MF	8	Daniel Johnson		(substituted on) 84'
FW	14	Dujuan Richards		(substituted on) 84'
Manager:
(Iceland) Heimir Hallgrímsson

GK	13	Guillermo Ochoa (c)
RB	19	Jorge Sánchez
CB	3	César Montes
CB	5	Johan Vásquez
LB	23	Jesús Gallardo
CM	14	Érick Sánchez		(substituted off) 63'
CM	7	Luis Romo
CM	18	Luis Chávez		(substituted off) 72'
RF	15	Uriel Antuna	(yellow card) 61'	(substituted off) 72'
CF	20	Henry Martín		(substituted off) 63'
LF	17	Orbelín Pineda		(substituted off) 87'
Substitutions:
FW	11	Santiago Giménez		(substituted on) 63'
MF	8	Carlos Rodríguez		(substituted on) 63'
FW	10	Roberto Alvarado		(substituted on) 72'
MF	4	Edson Álvarez	(yellow card) 90'	(substituted on) 72'
MF	16	Diego Lainez		(substituted on) 87'
Interim manager:
Jaime Lozano

Man of the Match:
Luis Chávez (Mexico)

Assistant referees:
Luis Ventura (Guatemala)
Humberto Panjoj (Guatemala)
Fourth official:
Bryan López (Guatemala)
Video assistant referee:
Ricardo Montero (Costa Rica)
Assistant video assistant referee:
Ismael Cornejo (El Salvador)

== Final ==
=== Mexico vs Panama ===
The two teams had met 28 times previously, with Mexico having won 20 of them, Panama two, and the other six matches ending in draws. They had met eight times in the Gold Cup, with the first three of these in group stages: Mexico's 1–0 victory in 2007, a 1–1 draw in 2009 and Panama's 2–1 victory in 2013. The two most recent Gold Cup meetings were two semi-finals with one win for each side: a 2–1 victory for Panama in 2013 and a 2–1 win after extra time for Mexico in 2015. Their most recent meeting had been the third place play-off of the 2022–23 CONCACAF Nations League, won by Mexico 1–0 a few days before the start of the 2023 Gold Cup.

Mexico was seeking a ninth Gold Cup title in their third consecutive final and eleventh overall. For its part, Panama was seeking a first Gold Cup title in their third final (the other two in 2009 and 2013), and to become the first Gold Cup champions outside of Mexico, the United States or Canada.

July 16, 2023
19:30 (16:30 UTC−7)

Mexico	1–0	Panama
Giménez 88'	Report

SoFi Stadium, Inglewood
Attendance: 72,963
Referee: Saíd Martínez (Honduras)

**Mexico**	**Panama**

GK	13	Guillermo Ochoa (c)
RB	19	Jorge Sánchez
CB	3	César Montes	(yellow card) 45+3'
CB	5	Johan Vásquez	(yellow card) 11'
LB	23	Jesús Gallardo	(yellow card) 55'
CM	7	Luis Romo
CM	4	Edson Álvarez	(yellow card) 58'
CM	18	Luis Chávez		(substituted off) 75'
RF	15	Uriel Antuna		(substituted off) 75'
CF	20	Henry Martín		(substituted off) 85'
LF	17	Orbelín Pineda		(substituted off) 90+2'
Substitutions:
FW	10	Roberto Alvarado		(substituted on) 75'
FW	14	Érick Sánchez		(substituted on) 75'
FW	11	Santiago Giménez		(substituted on) 85'
DF	21	Israel Reyes		(substituted on) 90+2'
Interim manager:
Jaime Lozano

GK	22	Orlando Mosquera	(yellow card) 90+6'
CB	4	Fidel Escobar
CB	3	Harold Cummings	(yellow card) 21'	(substituted off) 90+1'
CB	16	Andrés Andrade
RWB	10	Yoel Bárcenas
LWB	15	Eric Davis		(substituted off) 62'
RM	17	José Fajardo
CM	8	Adalberto Carrasquilla	(yellow card) 55'
CM	20	Aníbal Godoy (c)	(yellow card) 62'
LM	11	Ismael Díaz
CF	19	Alberto Quintero		(substituted off) 61'
Substitutions:
FW	18	Cecilio Waterman		(substituted on) 61'
DF	25	Iván Anderson		(substituted on) 62'
FW	9	Azarías Londoño		(substituted on) 90+1'
Manager:
(Spain) Thomas Christiansen			(yellow card) 26'

Man of the Match:
Santiago Giménez (Mexico)

Assistant referees:
Walter López (Honduras)
Christian Ramírez (Honduras)
Reserve assistant referee:
Caleb Wales (Trinidad and Tobago)
Fourth official:
Daneon Parchment (Jamaica)
Video assistant referee:
Ricardo Montero (Costa Rica)
Assistant video assistant referee:
Selvin Brown (Honduras)
