= Brayan Gil =

Salvadoran footballer (born 2001)

Personal information
- Full name: Brayan Alexander Gil Hurtado
- Date of birth: 28 June 2001 (age 25)
- Place of birth: Cali, Colombia
- Height: 1.85 m (6 ft 1 in)
- Position: Forward

Team information
- Current team: Baltika Kaliningrad
- Number: 91

Senior career*
Years	Team	Apps	(Gls)
2019–2020	FAS	25	(16)
2020	→ Gent (loan)	0	(0)
2020–2022	Alianza Petrolera	82	(12)
2023–2025	Deportes Tolima	66	(17)
2025–	Baltika Kaliningrad	54	(21)

International career^{‡}
2020	Colombia U20	2	(0)
2022–	El Salvador	28	(10)
- * Club domestic league appearances and goals as of 21 November 2026 ‡ National team caps and goals as of 17 November 2026

Brayan Alexander Gil Hurtado (born 28 June 2001) is a professional footballer who plays as a forward for Russian Premier League club Baltika Kaliningrad. Born in Colombia, he represents the El Salvador national team.

== Club career ==
=== Early career ===
Brayan "El Comandante" Gil first began training in the lower categories of the Fundación Educando a un Salvadoreño (FESA). He later went to Brujos Mario Calvo of the El Salvador Promotion league, becoming top scorer with 15 goals at 17 years of age and won the "Silver Goal" award from the sports magazine El Gráfico.

=== C.D. FAS ===
His performances at the youth level earned him a contract to play with C.D. FAS in the 2019 Apertura Tournament. He finished as the second highest top scorer with 18 goals, including a hat-trick against A.D. Chalatenango.

=== Baltika Kaliningrad ===
On 18 January 2025, Gil signed a four-and-a-half-year contract with Baltika Kaliningrad in the Russian First League.

Upon Baltika's return to the Russian Premier League in the 2025–26 season, Gil began to score regularly and went into the winter break as the second-best league scorer with 10 goals. He finished the season with 13 league goals, as he suffered a foot injury in mid-April and was not able to play for the last several weeks of the season.

== International career ==
Brayan Gil was eligible to represent Colombia, where he was born, and El Salvador through naturalization.

He debuted for Colombia U20 on 16 December against Ecuador U20 in a 5–1 win, and grabbed an assist against Ecuador on 19 December in a friendly.

He made his senior debut for El Salvador on 27 March 2023 against the United States during the CONCACAF Nations League in a 1–0 loss.

== Personal life ==
Hailing from a footballing family, Brayan has lived continuously in El Salvador since he was 4, as a result of his father's playing career, Cristian Gil. He is also the brother of both Cristian Gil Jr. and Mayer Gil.

== Career statistics ==
=== Club ===
As of 21 November 2026.

Club	Season	League			Cup		Continental		Total	
Club	Season	Division	Apps	Goals	Apps	Goals	Apps	Goals	Apps	Goals
FAS	2019–20	La Liga Mayor	25	16	0	0	–		25	16
Gent (loan)	2019–20	Jupiler League	0	0	0	0	–		0	0
Alianza Petrolera	2020	Categoría Primera A	7	0	3	3	–		10	3
Alianza Petrolera	2021	Categoría Primera A	36	4	1	0	–		37	4
Alianza Petrolera	2022	Categoría Primera A	39	8	1	1	–		40	9
Alianza Petrolera	Total		82	12	5	4	0	0	87	16
Deportes Tolima	2023	Categoría Primera A	28	4	1	0	3 (Note: Appearances in Copa Sudamericana)	0	32	4
Deportes Tolima	2024	Categoría Primera A	38	13	2	1	1	0	41	14
Deportes Tolima	Total		66	17	3	1	4	0	73	18
Baltika Kaliningrad	2024–25	Russian First League	11	3	0	0	–		11	3
Baltika Kaliningrad	2025–26	Russian Premier League	24	13	2	0	–		26	13
Baltika Kaliningrad	2026–27	Russian Premier League	14	5	4	0	–		18	5
Baltika Kaliningrad	Total		49	21	6	0	0	0	55	21
Career total			222	66	14	5	4	0	240	71

=== International ===
As of match played 17 November 2026.

National team	Year	Apps	Goals
El Salvador	2023	10	2
El Salvador	2024	1	1
El Salvador	2025	9	2
El Salvador	2026	8	5
Total		28	10

==== International goals ====
Scores and results list El Salvador's goal tally first.

No.	Date	Venue	Opponent	Score	Result	Competition
1	4 July 2023	Shell Energy Stadium, Houston, United States	Panama	1–0	2–2	2023 CONCACAF Gold Cup
2	10 September 2023	Estadio Jorge "El Mágico" González, San Salvador, El Salvador	Trinidad and Tobago	2–2	2–3	2023–24 CONCACAF Nations League A
3	26 March 2024	Shell Energy Stadium, Houston, United States	Honduras	1–0	1–1	Friendly
4	7 June 2025	Raymond E. Guishard Technical Centre, The Valley, Anguilla	Anguilla	2–0	3–0	2026 FIFA World Cup qualification
5	10 June 2025	Estadio Cuscatlán, San Salvador, El Salvador	Suriname	1–1	1–1	2026 FIFA World Cup qualification
6	25 September 2026	Estadio Jorge "El Mágico" González, San Salvador, El Salvador	Martinique	1–0	3–1	2026–27 CONCACAF Nations League A
7	25 September 2026	Estadio Jorge "El Mágico" González, San Salvador, El Salvador	Martinique	2–0	3–1	2026–27 CONCACAF Nations League A
8	13 November 2026	SKNFA Technical Center, Basseterre, Saint Kitts and Nevis	Saint Martin	1–0	2–0	2026–27 CONCACAF Nations League Play-in
9	17 November 2026	Estadio Jorge "El Mágico" González, San Salvador, El Salvador	Saint Martin	2–1	3–1	2026–27 CONCACAF Nations League Play-in
10	17 November 2026	Estadio Jorge "El Mágico" González, San Salvador, El Salvador	Saint Martin	3–1	3–1	2026–27 CONCACAF Nations League Play-in
