= Karl Fabien =

Martiniquais footballer (born 2000)

Personal information
- Full name: Karl Kezy Fabien
- Date of birth: 1 August 2000 (age 26)
- Place of birth: Argenteuil, France
- Height: 1.87 m (6 ft 2 in)
- Position: Forward

Team information
- Current team: IMT
- Number: 29

Senior career*
| Years | Team | Apps | (Gls) |
| 2017–2021 | Nancy II | 22 | (3) |
| 2020–2021 | Nancy | 1 | (0) |
| 2021–2022 | Orléans II | 15 | (4) |
| 2021–2022 | Orléans | 9 | (0) |
| 2022–2023 | Vierzon | 24 | (5) |
| 2023–2024 | Angoulême | 23 | (4) |
| 2024–2025 | Slavia Sofia | 21 | (3) |
| 2025–2026 | Levski Sofia | 20 | (0) |
| 2026– | IMT | 1 | (0) |

International career^{‡}
| 2022– | Martinique | 15 | (3) |
- * Club domestic league appearances and goals as of 23:35, 7 September 2026 (UTC) ‡ National team caps and goals as of 13:25, 24 February 2025 (UTC)

Karl Kezy Fabien (born 1 August 2000) is a professional footballer who plays as a forward for Serbian SuperLiga team IMT. Born in mainland France, he plays for the Martinique national team.

== Career ==
Fabien made his professional debut with AS Nancy in a 2–1 Ligue 2 loss to FC Lorient on 24 January 2020.

On 11 July 2022, Fabien signed with Vierzon in the fourth-tier Championnat National 2. In July 2024, he signed with Bulgarian club Slavia Sofia. In February 2025, Fabien joined Levski Sofia from the same country, signing a contract until the end of 2027.

== Personal life ==
Born in mainland France, Fabien is of Martiniquais descent. He was called up to represent the Martinique national team for a pair of friendlies in March 2022. He debuted with Martinique in a friendly 4–3 win over Guadeloupe on 26 March 2022.

== Career statistics ==
=== International ===
As of match played 15 October 2024

Appearances and goals by national team and year
| National team | Year | Apps | Goals |
|---|---|---|---|
Martinique
| Martinique | 2022 | 3 | 1 |
| Martinique | 2023 | 8 | 2 |
| Martinique | 2024 | 4 | 0 |
| Total | | 15 | 3 |

Scores and results list Martinique's goal tally first, score column indicates score after each Fabien goal.

List of international goals scored by Karl Fabien
| No. | Date | Venue | Opponent | Score | Result | Competition |
|---|---|---|---|---|---|---|
| 1 | 26 March 2022 | Stade Robert Bobin, Bondoufle, France | Guadeloupe | 1–0 | 4–3 | Friendly |
| 2 | 16 June 2023 | DRV PNK Stadium, Fort Lauderdale, United States | Saint Lucia | 1–0 | 3–1 | 2023 CONCACAF Gold Cup qualification |
| 3 | 30 June 2023 | Red Bull Arena, Harrison, United States | Panama | 1–2 | 1–2 | 2023 CONCACAF Gold Cup |

== Honours ==
Levski Sofia

- Bulgarian First League: 2025–26
