= Cristian Gil =

Cristian Gil may refer to:

- Cristian Gil (footballer, born 1979), Colombian football forward, full name Cristian Ali Gil Mosquera
- Cristian Gil (footballer, born 1996), football forward, son of Cristian Ali Gil Mosquera
