= Anthony Contreras =

Costa Rican footballer (born 2000)

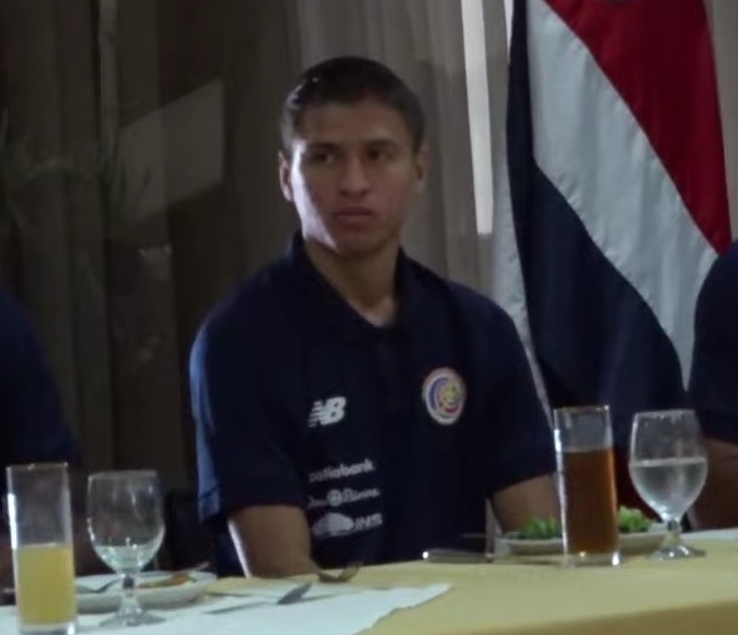
- Contreras in 2022

Personal information
- Full name: Anthony Daniel Contreras Enríquez
- Date of birth: 29 January 2000 (age 26)
- Place of birth: Lomas de Pavas, San José, Costa Rica
- Height: 1.80 m (5 ft 11 in)
- Position: Forward

Team information
- Current team: Riga
- Number: 9

Youth career
- Zapote
- 2015–2019: Herediano

Senior career*
Years	Team	Apps	(Gls)
2017–2023	Herediano	68	(19)
2019	→ La U (loan)	20	(7)
2020	→ Grecia (loan)	15	(6)
2020	→ Guadalupe (loan)	10	(5)
2021–2022	→ Guanacasteca (loan)	43	(22)
2023–	Riga	61	(23)
2024	→ Pafos FC (loan)	12	(0)

International career^{‡}
2021–	Costa Rica	31	(4)
- * Club domestic league appearances and goals as of 14 June 2026 ‡ National team caps and goals as of 21:12, 9 September 2025 (UTC)

Anthony Daniel Contreras Enríquez (born 29 January 2000) is a Costa Rican footballer who plays as a forward for Riga FC, and the Costa Rica national team.

== Club career ==
=== Herediano ===
Contreras joined C.S. Herediano in 2015, after he was spotted by a scout in a game for a club in Zapote, at the age of 15. He then went on a trial at the club and then joined the club permanently. Before that, Contreras had never played for a club.

23 months after joining Herediano, on 15 January 2017, he got his official debut for the club in the Liga FPD against Belén FC at the age of 16. Contreras started on the bench, coming on as a substitute for Heyreel Saravia in the 90th minute. This game was his only appearance in the 2017–18 season. In the following season, he only made one appearance, while he made zero in the 2018–19 season. To gain some experience, he was loaned out to La U Universitarios in the summer 2019 for the rest of the year, where he played 20 games as scored six goals.

On 13 December 2019 it was confirmed, that Contreras would be playing the rest of the 2019–20 season on loan for Municipal Grecia, as well as six other players that Grecia had loaned from Herediano. Contreras played 15 games and scores six goals for the club.

Herediano announced in June 2020, that Contreras had returned to the club. Contreras participated in the teams pre-season and was also on the bench for a cup game in August 2020. However, on 15 September 2020, he was sent out on loan for the third time, this time to Guadalupe FC for the rest of 2020.

Returning from loan in January 2021, Contreras became a regular player for Herediano and made 26 league appearances from January to June 2021. However, on 21 June 2021, Contreras was loaned out to AD Guanacasteca for the rest of 2021.

=== Riga FC ===
On 16 July 2023, Contreras joined Latvian Higher League side Riga FC. Contreras made a good start to his time at the club, scoring three goals in his first three league games.

Riga FC announced in January 2024, that Contreras was sent out on loan to Pafos FC. Contreras returned to Riga ahead of the 2024–25 season.

== International career ==
In November 2019, Contreras was called up for the Costa Rican national team's pre-squad.

Contreras was also a part of the Costa Rican U23 national team that was called up for the 2020 CONCACAF Men's Olympic Qualifying Championship in March 2020.

Contreras made his debut for the senior Costa Rica national football team on 12 November 2021 in a World Cup qualifier against Canada. Contreras scored his first goal for the national team on 27 March 2022 during a 2022 FIFA World Cup qualifier against El Salvador.

== Career statistics ==
=== International ===
As of match played 9 September 2025

Appearances and goals by national team and year
National team	Year	Apps	Goals
Costa Rica	2021	1	0
Costa Rica	2022	11	2
Costa Rica	2023	12	2
Costa Rica	2024	5	0
Costa Rica	2025	2	0
Total		31	4

Scores and results list Costa Rica's goal tally first.

List of international goals scored by Anthony Contreras
No.	Date	Venue	Opponent	Score	Result	Competition	Ref.
1	27 March 2022	Estadio Cuscatlán, San Salvador, El Salvador	El Salvador	1–0	2–1	2022 FIFA World Cup qualification	
2	30 March 2022	Estadio Nacional, San José, Costa Rica	United States	2–0	2–0	2022 FIFA World Cup qualification	
3	25 March 2023	Stade Pierre-Aliker, Fort-de-France, Martinique	Martinique	2–1	2–1	2022–23 CONCACAF Nations League A	
4	4 July 2023	Red Bull Arena, Harrison, United States	Martinique	5–1	6–4	2023 CONCACAF Gold Cup	
