= Kevin Chamorro =

Costa Rican association football player

Personal information
- Full name: Kevin José Chamorro Rodríguez
- Date of birth: 8 April 2000 (age 26)
- Place of birth: Liberia, Guanacaste, Costa Rica
- Height: 1.87 m (6 ft 1 1/2 in)
- Position: Goalkeeper

Team information
- Current team: Rio Ave
- Number: 22

Senior career*
Years	Team	Apps	(Gls)
2017–2019	Carmelita	27	(0)
2019–2021	San Carlos	33	(0)
2022–2025	Saprissa	95	(0)
2024–2025	→ Estoril (loan)	4	(0)
2025–	Rio Ave	3	(0)

International career^{‡}
2017	Costa Rica U17	1	(0)
2018	Costa Rica U20	6	(0)
2021	Costa Rica U23	2	(0)
2023–	Costa Rica	12	(0)
- * Club domestic league appearances and goals as of 18 February 2026 ‡ National team caps and goals as of 22:23, 31 March 2026 (UTC)

Kevin José Chamorro Rodríguez (born 8 April 2000) is a Costa Rican professional footballer who plays as a goalkeeper for Primeira Liga club Rio Ave, and the Costa Rica national team.

== Early life ==
Raised by a single mother who had to work two jobs, Chamorro was travelling 40km a day to train. Therefore he moved at twelve years-old closer to the capital to pursue his dream of becoming a footballer.

== Career ==
=== A.D. Carmelita ===
Having joined their academy at fourteen years-old, Chamorro made his debut as a seventeen year-old for A.D. Carmelita against Santos de Guápiles F.C. in a 1-1 draw on 22 February 2018. Within a few weeks he had become a regular in the side that season.

=== A.D. San Carlos ===
On May 29, 2019, Chamorro signed for A.D. San Carlos for one year. On June 17, 2020, he renewed with the team.

=== Deportivo Saprissa ===
In June 2021 he signed for Deportivo Saprissa agreeing to a two-year deal. In December 2022 he signed a new four-year contract with the club tying him down until 2026.

In the summer of 2024, Chamorro was sent on a season-long loan with an optional buy-clause to Portuguese Primeira Liga club Estoril. At the end of the season, having made just five appearances for the Canaries, he returned to Saprissa.

=== Rio Ave ===
On 21 July 2025, Chamorro joined another Primeira Liga club, this time on a permanent deal, signing a four-year contract with Rio Ave.

== International career ==
Chamorro was selected by Costa Rica U-17 for the 2017 FIFA U-20 World Cup. Chamorro was called up to the senior Costa Rica national football team for the first time in January 2019, as under-study to Keylor Navas.

On March 17, 2023, he was called up by the senior side for 2022-23 CONCACAF Nations League matches against Martinique and Panama, starting both games.

== Career statistics ==
=== Club ===
As of match played 31 January 2026.

Appearances and goals by club, season and competition
Club	Season	League			Cup		League Cup		Continental		Other		Total	
Club	Season	Division	Apps	Goals	Apps	Goals	Apps	Goals	Apps	Goals	Apps	Goals	Apps	Goals
Carmelita	2017–18	Liga FPD	8	0	—		—		—		—		8	0
Carmelita	2018–19	Liga FPD	19	0	—		—		—		—		19	0
Carmelita	Total		27	0	—		—		—		—		27	0
San Carlos	2019–20	Liga FPD	6	0	—		—		0	0	—		6	0
San Carlos	2020–21	Liga FPD	27	0	—		—		—		—		27	0
San Carlos	Total		33	0	—		—		0	0	—		33	0
Saprissa	2021–22	Liga FPD	6	0	—		—		—		—		6	0
Saprissa	2022–23	Liga FPD	44	0	3	0	—		—		—		47	0
Saprissa	2023–24	Liga FPD	45	0	1	0	—		2	0	1	0	49	0
Saprissa	Total		95	0	4	0	—		2	0	1	0	102	0
Estoril (loan)	2024–25	Primeira Liga	4	0	1	0	0	0	—		0	0	5	0
Rio Ave	2025–26	Primeira Liga	3	0	1	0	0	0	—		—		4	0
Career total			162	0	6	0	0	0	2	0	1	0	171	0

=== International ===
As of match played 31 March 2026

Appearances and goals by national team and year
National team	Year	Apps	Goals
Costa Rica	2023	10	0
Costa Rica	2024	1	0
Costa Rica	2026	1	0
Total		12	0
