= Florian Lapis =

Martiniquais footballer (born 1993)

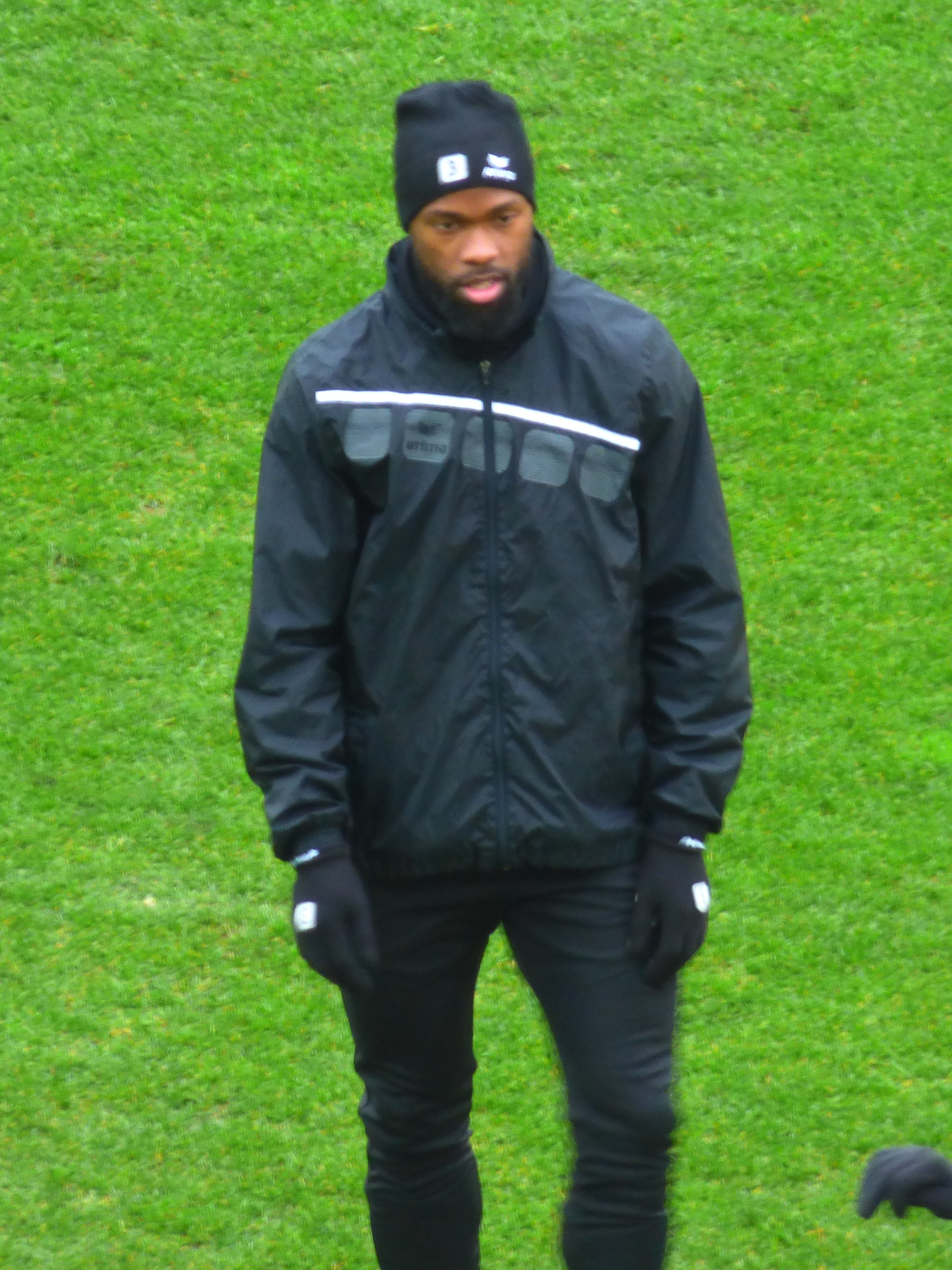
- Lapis in 2019

Personal information
- Full name: Florian Nicolas Lapis
- Date of birth: 8 August 1993 (age 33)
- Place of birth: Saint-Denis, France
- Height: 1.83 m (6 ft 0 in)
- Position: Left-back

Team information
- Current team: Bourges Foot 18
- Number: 3

Youth career
- 2010–2011: Valenciennes
- 2011–2012: Paris FC

Senior career*
Years	Team	Apps	(Gls)
2012–2014	Paris FC II	9	(0)
2014–2015	Saint-Denis		
2015–2016	La Rochelle		
2016–2018	Béziers	20	(1)
2018–2020	Niort	41	(1)
2020–2022	Orléans	44	(0)
2022–2024	Versailles	21	(0)
2024–	Bourges Foot 18	10	(0)

International career^{‡}
2022–	Martinique	7	(0)
- * Club domestic league appearances and goals as of 8 November 2024 ‡ National team caps and goals as of 5 July 2023

Florian Nicolas Lapis (born 8 August 1993) is a professional footballer who plays as a left-back for Championnat National 1 club Bourges Foot 18. Born in mainland France, he plays for the Martinique national team since 2022.

== Club career ==
Lapis started his career in the lower divisions of France, and joined Béziers in 2016. After helping Béziers get promoted into the Ligue 2 in 2018, Lapis transferred to Chamois Niortais on 12 June 2018. Lapis made his professional debut for Niort in a 2–1 Ligue 2 win over Red Star on 27 June 2018. At the end of his Niort contract, he signed a two-year deal with Orléans on 13 June 2020.

In June 2022, Lapis signed with Versailles.

== International career ==
Lapis was called up to the Martinique regional team for 2019–20 CONCACAF Nations League qualifying matches in March 2019.
