= Jefry Valverde =

Costa Rican association football player

Personal information
- Full name: Jefry Antonio Valverde Rojas
- Date of birth: 10 June 1995 (age 31)
- Place of birth: San José, Costa Rica
- Position: Midfielder

Team information
- Current team: Sporting F.C.
- Number: 7

Senior career*
Years	Team	Apps	(Gls)
2014-2019	Deportivo Saprissa	1	(0)
2019-2020	A.D.R. Jicaral	43	(6)
2020-2022	Alajuelense	0	(0)
2020-2022	→ AD San Carlos (loan)	78	(5)
2022-2025	Deportivo Saprissa	94	(2)
2025-	Sporting F.C.	24	(0)

International career^{‡}
2022-	Costa Rica	12	(0)
- * Club domestic league appearances and goals as of 00:15 26 May 2026 (UTC) ‡ National team caps and goals as of 00:15 28 December 2025 (UTC)

Jefry Antonio Valverde Rojas (born June 1995) is a Costa Rican footballer who plays for Sporting F.C. as a midfielder.

== Club career ==
Valverde came through the youth ranks at Deportivo Saprissa, coming through the Saprissa Minor Divisions, from the U15 to Generación Saprissa second division to making his debut in the Costa Rican First Division, at the age of 18.

After playing for A.D.R. Jicaral, he joined Liga Deportiva Alajuelense, but without playing a minute for the side, he joined A.D. San Carlos, initially on loan.

In November 2022, Valverde rejoined Deportivo Saprissa, agreeing to a three-year contract. His time at Saprissa included three national titles, one Super Cup, and one Recopa. He signed an eighteen-month contract with Sporting F.C. in August 2025.

== International career ==
In January 2022, he was called up by manager Luis Fernando Suárez to represent the Costa Rica national football team in two qualifying matches for the 2022 World Cup. On 30 January 2022 he made his debut against Mexico, appearing as a second-half substitute in a 0–0 draw. Three days later he made his first international start as Costa Rica played Jamaica, and won 1–0.

== Personal life ==
In 2020, Valverde was revealed to be in a relationship with Costa Rican footballer Melissa Herrera.
