= Enrick Reuperné =

Martiniquais footballer (born 1998)

Personal information
- Date of birth: 3 August 1998 (age 28)
- Place of birth: Schœlcher, Martinique
- Height: 1.77 m (5 ft 10 in)
- Position: Striker

Team information
- Current team: Aiglon du Lamentin

Senior career*
Years	Team	Apps	(Gls)
2018–2020	Golden Star		
2020–	Aiglon du Lamentin		

International career^{‡}
2021–	Martinique	3	(0)
- * Club domestic league appearances and goals as of 03:44, 6 July 2021 (UTC) ‡ National team caps and goals as of 03:44, 6 July 2021 (UTC)

Enrick Reuperné (born 3 August 1998) is a professional footballer who plays as a striker for the club Aiglon du Lamentin, and the Martinique national team.

== International career ==
Reuperné debuted with the Martinique regional team in a 2–1 CONCACAF Nations League loss to Guadeloupe on 13 October 2019. He was called up to represent Martinique at the 2021 CONCACAF Gold Cup.

== Personal life ==
Reuperné is the son of the retired Martinique international footballer Fabrice Reuperné, who is also his current manager at Aiglon du Lamentin.
