= Mayer Gil =

Salvadoran footballer (born 2003)

Personal information
- Full name: Mayer Andrés Gil Hurtado
- Date of birth: 7 September 2003 (age 23)
- Place of birth: Yopal, Colombia
- Height: 1.75 m (5 ft 9 in)
- Position: Forward

Team information
- Current team: Alianza Petrolera
- Number: 99

Senior career*
Years	Team	Apps	(Gls)
2020–2021	FAS	6	(0)
2021	Atlético Marte	3	(0)
2022–2024	Alianza Petrolera	47	(6)
2024–	Alianza	53	(5)

International career^{‡}
2022	El Salvador U20	4	(3)
2022–	El Salvador	16	(2)
- * Club domestic league appearances and goals as of 28 March 2023 (UTC) ‡ National team caps and goals as of 4 July 2023 (UTC)

Mayer Andrés Gil Hurtado (born 7 September 2003) is a professional footballer who plays as a forward for Categoría Primera A club Alianza. Born in Colombia, he represents El Salvador at international level.

== Club career ==
=== FAS ===
Gil started his career with FAS.

=== Alianza Petrolera ===
He made his debut for Alianza Petrolera as a substitute against Millonarios during the 2022 season in a 4–2 loss. Gil scored his first league goals for Alianza Petrolera on 10 March 2023 where he came on as a substitute and went on to score twice in a 3–2 win over Deportivo Pasto. On 19 May 2023, Mayer Gil signed a new 3-year contract extension with the club.

== International career ==
Mayer Gil was eligible to represent Colombia, where he was born, and El Salvador through naturalization.

He previously was called up for El Salvador U20. He played for them during the 2022 CONCACAF U-20 Championship.

He made his senior debut for El Salvador on 16 November 2022 against Nicaragua as a substitute in a 1–0 friendly loss. His debut in a competitive match came against the United States on 27 March 2023 as a substitute during the CONCACAF Nations League in a 1–0 loss.

== Personal life ==
Hailing from a footballing family, Mayer is the son of former Colombian footballer Cristian Gil, who named Mayer after his friend Mayer Candelo.

Mayer is also the brother of both Cristian Gil Jr. and Brayan Gil.

== Career statistics ==
=== Club ===
As of 28 March 2023.

Club	Season	League			Cup		Continental		Other		Total	
Club	Season	Division	Apps	Goals	Apps	Goals	Apps	Goals	Apps	Goals	Apps	Goals
FAS	2019–20	La Liga Mayor	2	0	0	0	–		0	0	2	0
FAS	2020–21	La Liga Mayor	4	0	0	0	–		0	0	4	0
Atlético Marte	2020–21	La Liga Mayor	3	0	0	0	–		0	0	3	0
Alianza Petrolera	2022	Categoría Primera A	1	0	0	0	–		0	0	1	0
Alianza Petrolera	2023	Categoría Primera A	3	2	1	0	–		0	0	4	2
Career total			13	2	1	0	0	0	0	0	14	2

=== International ===
As of match played 26 March 2024.

National team	Year	Apps	Goals
El Salvador	2022	1	0
El Salvador	2023	12	1
El Salvador	2024	1	0
Total		14	1

==== International goals ====
Scores and results list El Salvador's goal tally first.

No.	Date	Venue	Opponent	Score	Result	Competition
1.	4 July 2023	Shell Energy Stadium, Houston, United States	Panama	2–2	2–2	2023 CONCACAF Gold Cup
