= 2022–23 CONCACAF Nations League A =

Tournament details
- Dates: Group phase: 2 June 2022 – 28 March 2023; Nations League Finals: 15–18 June 2023
- Teams: 12

Final positions
- Champions: United States (2nd title)
- Runners-up: Canada
- Third place: Mexico
- Fourth place: Panama

Tournament statistics
- Matches played: 28
- Goals scored: 80 (2.86 per match)
- Top scorer(s): (Canada) Jonathan David (United States) Jesús Ferreira (United States) Ricardo Pepi (4 goals each)

The 2022–23 CONCACAF Nations League A was the top division of the 2022–23 edition of the CONCACAF Nations League, the second season of the international football competition involving the men's national teams of the 41 member associations of CONCACAF. The group stage was held from 2 June 2022 to 28 March 2023.

League A culminated with the 2023 CONCACAF Nations League Finals in June 2023 to crown the champions of the CONCACAF Nations League. These matches were played at Allegiant Stadium in Paradise, Nevada, United States.

The top eight teams qualified to the 2023 CONCACAF Gold Cup, and the remaining four teams entered the 2023 CONCACAF Gold Cup qualification.

== Format ==
League A consisted of twelve teams. The league was split into four groups of three teams. The teams competed in a home-and-away round-robin format over the course of the group phase, with matches being played in the official FIFA match windows in June 2022 and March 2023. The four group winners qualified for the Nations League Finals. As a result of a format change, no teams were relegated this season.

=== Team changes ===
The following were the team changes of League A from the 2019–20 season:

Incoming
Promoted from
Nations League B
- El Salvador
- Grenada
- Jamaica
- Suriname

Outgoing
Relegated to
Nations League B
- Bermuda
- Cuba
- Haiti
- Trinidad and Tobago

=== Seeding ===
The draw for the 2022-23 CONCACAF Nations League took place in Miami, Florida, United States on 4 April 2022, 19:00 EDT. Each of the League's draws began by randomly selecting a team from Pot 1 and placing them in Group A of their respective league. The draws continued by selecting the remaining teams from Pot 1 and positioning them into Groups B, C and D in sequential order. The same procedure was done for the remaining pots. Teams were seeded into pots using CONCACAF Ranking.

Pot 1
Team	Pts	Rank
Mexico	2,020	1
United States	1,917	2
Canada	1,821	3
Costa Rica	1,805	4

Pot 2
Team	Pts	Rank
Panama	1,624	5
Jamaica	1,471	6
El Salvador	1,390	9
Honduras	1,350	10

Pot 3
Team	Pts	Rank
Martinique	1,252	11
Curaçao	1,249	12
Suriname	1,089	15
Grenada	834	25

== Groups ==
The fixture list was confirmed by CONCACAF on 6 April 2022.

All match times are in EDT (UTC−4) as listed by CONCACAF (local times, if different, are in parentheses).

=== Group A ===
Pos	Team	Pld	W	D	L	GF	GA	GD	Pts	Qualification	(Mexico)	(Jamaica)	(Suriname)
1	Mexico	4	2	2	0	8	3	+5	8	Qualification for Finals and Gold Cup	—	2–2	3–0
2	Jamaica	4	1	3	0	7	5	+2	6	Qualification for Gold Cup	1–1	—	3–1
3	Suriname	4	0	1	3	2	9	−7	1	Advance to Gold Cup prelims	0–2	1–1	—

Source: CONCACAF
Rules for classification: Tiebreakers
4 June 2022
19:00 (20:00 UTC−3)

Suriname	1–1	Jamaica
Knight 84' (o.g.)	Report	Flemmings 39'

Dr. Ir. Franklin Essed Stadion, Paramaribo
Attendance: 3,032
Referee: Selvin Brown (Honduras)

7 June 2022
21:00 (20:00 UTC−5)

Jamaica	3–1	Suriname
Morrison 16'; Flemmings 43'; J. Lowe 70'	Report	Wildschut 21'

National Stadium, Kingston
Referee: Keylor Herrera (Costa Rica) (Note: Referee Ismail Elfath from the United States, who was originally assigned to the Jamaica v Suriname match, was replaced by Keylor Herrera from Costa Rica.)

11 June 2022
22:00 (21:00 UTC−5)

Mexico	3–0	Suriname
Reyes 4'; Martín 40' (pen.); Sánchez 90+4'	Report

Estadio Corona, Torreón
Referee: Iván Barton (El Salvador)

14 June 2022
20:00 (19:00 UTC−5)

Jamaica	1–1	Mexico
Bailey 4'	Report	Romo 45+3'

National Stadium, Kingston
Referee: Bryan López (Guatemala)

23 March 2023
20:00 (21:00 UTC−3)

Suriname	0–2	Mexico
	Report	Vásquez 64'; Dankerlui 82' (o.g.)

Dr. Ir. Franklin Essed Stadion, Paramaribo
Referee: Saíd Martínez (Honduras)

26 March 2023
20:00 (18:00 UTC−6)

Mexico	2–2	Jamaica
Pineda 17'; Lozano 45+2' (pen.)	Report	De Cordova-Reid 8'; Álvarez 33' (o.g.)

Estadio Azteca, Mexico City
Referee: Ismail Elfath (United States)

=== Group B ===
Pos	Team	Pld	W	D	L	GF	GA	GD	Pts	Qualification	(Panama)	(Costa Rica)	(Martinique)
1	Panama	4	3	1	0	8	0	+8	10	Qualification for Finals and Gold Cup	—	2–0	5–0
2	Costa Rica	4	2	0	2	4	4	0	6	Qualification for Gold Cup	0–1	—	2–0
3	Martinique	4	0	1	3	1	9	−8	1	Advance to Gold Cup prelims	0–0	1–2	—

Source: CONCACAF
Rules for classification: Tiebreakers
2 June 2022
19:30 (18:30 UTC−5)

Panama	2–0	Costa Rica
Díaz 52'; Waterman 75'	Report

Estadio Rommel Fernández, Panama City
Referee: Fernando Hernández (Mexico)

5 June 2022
13:00 (11:00 UTC−6)

Costa Rica	2–0	Martinique
Campbell 28'; Calvo 88'	Report

Estadio Nacional, San José
Attendance: 7,000
Referee: Walter López (Guatemala)

9 June 2022
20:00 (19:00 UTC−5)

Panama	5–0	Martinique
Torres 6'; Vitulin 15' (o.g.); Escobar 56'; Bárcenas 85', 90+3'	Report

Estadio Rommel Fernández, Panama City
Referee: Ismael Cornejo (El Salvador)

12 June 2022
18:00

Martinique	0–0	Panama
	Report

Stade Pierre-Aliker, Fort-de-France
Referee: Fernando Guerrero (Mexico)

25 March 2023
19:00

Martinique	1–2	Costa Rica
Biron 18'	Report	Suárez 88'; Contreras 90+2'

Stade Pierre-Aliker, Fort-de-France
Attendance: 6,249
Referee: Drew Fischer (Canada)

28 March 2023
22:00 (20:00 UTC−6)

Costa Rica	0–1	Panama
	Report	Fajardo 77'

Estadio Nacional, San José
Referee: César Ramos (Mexico)

=== Group C ===
Pos	Team	Pld	W	D	L	GF	GA	GD	Pts	Qualification	(Canada)	(Honduras)	(Curaçao)
1	Canada	4	3	0	1	11	3	+8	9	Qualification for Finals and Gold Cup	—	4–1	4–0
2	Honduras	4	2	0	2	5	7	−2	6	Qualification for Gold Cup	2–1	—	1–2
3	Curaçao	4	1	0	3	2	8	−6	3	Advance to Gold Cup prelims	0–2	0–1	—

Source: CONCACAF
Rules for classification: Tiebreakers
3 June 2022
20:00

Curaçao	0–1	Honduras
	Report	Pinto 23'

Ergilio Hato Stadium, Willemstad
Attendance: 7,000
Referee: Daneon Parchment (Jamaica)

6 June 2022
22:00 (20:00 UTC−6)

Honduras	1–2	Curaçao
Quioto 90+4'	Report	L. Bacuna 34'; Van den Hurk 82'

Estadio Olímpico Metropolitano, San Pedro Sula
Attendance: 8,347
Referee: Juan Gabriel Calderón (Costa Rica)

9 June 2022
22:30 (19:30 UTC−7)

Canada	4–0	Curaçao
Davies 27' (pen.), 71'; Vitória 42'; Cavallini 85'	Report

BC Place, Vancouver
Attendance: 17,216
Referee: Nima Saghafi (United States)

13 June 2022
22:00 (20:00 UTC−6)

Honduras	2–1	Canada
K. López 13'; Arriaga 78'	Report	David 86'

Estadio Olímpico Metropolitano, San Pedro Sula
Referee: Mario Escobar (Guatemala)

25 March 2023
21:00

Curaçao	0–2	Canada
	Report	David 23'; Larin 43'

Ergilio Hato Stadium, Willemstad
Attendance: 7,800
Referee: Juan Gabriel Calderón (Costa Rica)

28 March 2023
20:00

Canada	4–1	Honduras
Larin 9', 12'; David 50'; Osorio 80'	Report	Benguché 73'

BMO Field, Toronto
Attendance: 13,626
Referee: Iván Barton (El Salvador)

=== Group D ===
Pos	Team	Pld	W	D	L	GF	GA	GD	Pts	Qualification	(United States)	(El Salvador)	(Grenada)
1	United States	4	3	1	0	14	2	+12	10	Qualification for Finals and Gold Cup	—	1–0	5–0
2	El Salvador	4	1	2	1	6	5	+1	5	Qualification for Gold Cup	1–1	—	3–1
3	Grenada	4	0	1	3	4	17	−13	1	Advance to Gold Cup prelims	1–7	2–2	—

Source: CONCACAF
Rules for classification: Tiebreakers
4 June 2022
22:00 (20:00 UTC−6)

El Salvador	3–1	Grenada
Bonilla 2', 43'; Paterson 55' (o.g.)	Report	McQueen 4'

Estadio Cuscatlán, San Salvador
Attendance: 2,611
Referee: Luis Enrique Santander (Mexico)

7 June 2022
19:00

Grenada	2–2	El Salvador
Berkeley-Agyepong 29'; Charles 54'	Report	Larín 35' (pen.); Gil 88'

Kirani James Athletic Stadium, St. George's
Attendance: 820
Referee: José Torres (Puerto Rico) (Note: Referee Francia González from Mexico, who was originally assigned to the El Salvador v Grenada match, was replaced by José Torres from Puerto Rico.)

10 June 2022
22:00 (21:00 UTC−5)

United States	5–0	Grenada
Ferreira 43', 54', 56', 78'; Arriola 62'	Report

Q2 Stadium, Austin
Attendance: 20,500
Referee: Saíd Martínez (Honduras)

14 June 2022
22:00 (20:00 UTC−6)

El Salvador	1–1	United States
Larín 35'	Report	Morris 90+1'

Estadio Cuscatlán, San Salvador
Attendance: 6,313
Referee: César Ramos (Mexico)

24 March 2023
20:00

Grenada	1–7	United States
Hippolyte 32'	Report	Pepi 4', 53'; Aaronson 20'; McKennie 31', 34'; Pulisic 49'; Zendejas 72'

Kirani James Athletic Stadium, St. George's
Attendance: 7,032
Referee: Daneon Parchment (Jamaica)

27 March 2023
19:30

United States	1–0	El Salvador
Pepi 62'	Report

Exploria Stadium, Orlando
Attendance: 18,947
Referee: Mario Escobar (Guatemala)

== Nations League Finals ==
=== Seeding ===
The four teams were ranked based on their results in the group stage to determine the semi-final matchups. The first seed played the fourth seed and the second seed played the third seed.

Seed	Grp	Team	Pld	W	D	L	GF	GA	GD	Pts
1	D	United States (H)	4	3	1	0	14	2	+12	10
2	B	Panama	4	3	1	0	8	0	+8	10
3	C	Canada	4	3	0	1	11	3	+8	9
4	A	Mexico	4	2	2	0	8	3	+5	8

Source: CONCACAF
Rules for classification: Tiebreakers
(H) Hosts

=== Bracket ===
Semi-finals
15 June – Paradise
Panama	0
Canada	2
15 June – Paradise
United States	3
Mexico	0

Final
18 June – Paradise
Canada	0
United States	2
Third place play-off
18 June – Paradise
Panama	0
Mexico	1

All times are local, PDT (UTC−7).

=== Semi-finals ===
15 June 2023
16:00

Panama	0–2	Canada
	Report	David 25'; Davies 70'

Allegiant Stadium, Paradise
Attendance: 65,000
Referee: Juan Gabriel Calderón (Costa Rica)

15 June 2023
19:00

United States	3–0	Mexico
Pulisic 37', 46'; Pepi 79'	Report

Allegiant Stadium, Paradise
Attendance: 65,000
Referee: Iván Barton (El Salvador)

=== Third place play-off ===
18 June 2023
15:00

Panama	0–1	Mexico
	Report	Gallardo 4'

Allegiant Stadium, Paradise
Attendance: 35,000
Referee: Daneon Parchment (Jamaica)

=== Final ===
18 June 2023
18:00

Canada	0–2	United States
	Report	Richards 12'; Balogun 34'

Allegiant Stadium, Paradise
Attendance: 35,000
Referee: Saíd Martínez (Honduras)

== Statistics ==
=== Goalscorers ===
There were 80 goals scored in 28 matches, for an average of 2.86 goals per match.

4 goals

- (Canada) Jonathan David
- (United States) Jesús Ferreira
- (United States) Ricardo Pepi

3 goals

- (Canada) Alphonso Davies
- (Canada) Cyle Larin
- (United States) Christian Pulisic

2 goals

- (El Salvador) Nelson Bonilla
- (El Salvador) Alexander Larín
- (Jamaica) Junior Flemmings
- (Panama) Yoel Bárcenas
- (United States) Weston McKennie

1 goal

- (Canada) Lucas Cavallini
- (Canada) Jonathan Osorio
- (Canada) Steven Vitória
- (Costa Rica) Francisco Calvo
- (Costa Rica) Joel Campbell
- (Costa Rica) Anthony Contreras
- (Costa Rica) Aarón Suárez
- (Curaçao) Leandro Bacuna
- (Curaçao) Anthony van den Hurk
- (El Salvador) Cristian Gil
- (Grenada) Jacob Berkeley-Agyepong
- (Grenada) Jamal Charles
- (Grenada) Myles Hippolyte
- (Grenada) Alexander McQueen
- (Honduras) Kervin Arriaga
- (Honduras) Jorge Benguché
- (Honduras) Kevin López
- (Honduras) José Pinto
- (Honduras) Romell Quioto
- (Jamaica) Leon Bailey
- (Jamaica) Bobby De Cordova-Reid
- (Jamaica) Jamal Lowe
- (Jamaica) Ravel Morrison
- (Martinique) Mickaël Biron
- (Mexico) Jesús Gallardo
- (Mexico) Hirving Lozano
- (Mexico) Henry Martín
- (Mexico) Orbelín Pineda
- (Mexico) Israel Reyes
- (Mexico) Luis Romo
- (Mexico) Érick Sánchez
- (Mexico) Johan Vásquez
- (Panama) Ismael Díaz
- (Panama) Fidel Escobar
- (Panama) José Fajardo
- (Panama) Gabriel Torres
- (Panama) Cecilio Waterman
- (Suriname) Yanic Wildschut
- (United States) Brenden Aaronson
- (United States) Paul Arriola
- (United States) Folarin Balogun
- (United States) Jordan Morris
- (United States) Chris Richards
- (United States) Alejandro Zendejas

1 own goal

- (Grenada) A. J. Paterson (against El Salvador)
- (Jamaica) Amal Knight (against Suriname)
- (Martinique) Karl Vitulin (against Panama)
- (Mexico) Edson Álvarez (against Jamaica)
- (Suriname) Damil Dankerlui (against Mexico)

=== Best XI ===
CONCACAF announced the following squad as the best eleven of League A after the conclusion of the group stage.

Goalkeeper	Defenders	Midfielders	Forwards
(Martinique) Yannis Clementia	(El Salvador) Bryan Tamacas (Panama) Fidel Escobar (United States) Auston Trusty	(United States) Christian Pulisic (Canada) Jonathan Osorio (Panama) Adalberto Carrasquilla (Canada) Ismaël Koné	(Canada) Cyle Larin (Jamaica) Bobby Decordova-Reid (United States) Ricardo Pepi
