= Suhander Zúñiga =

Costa Rican association football player

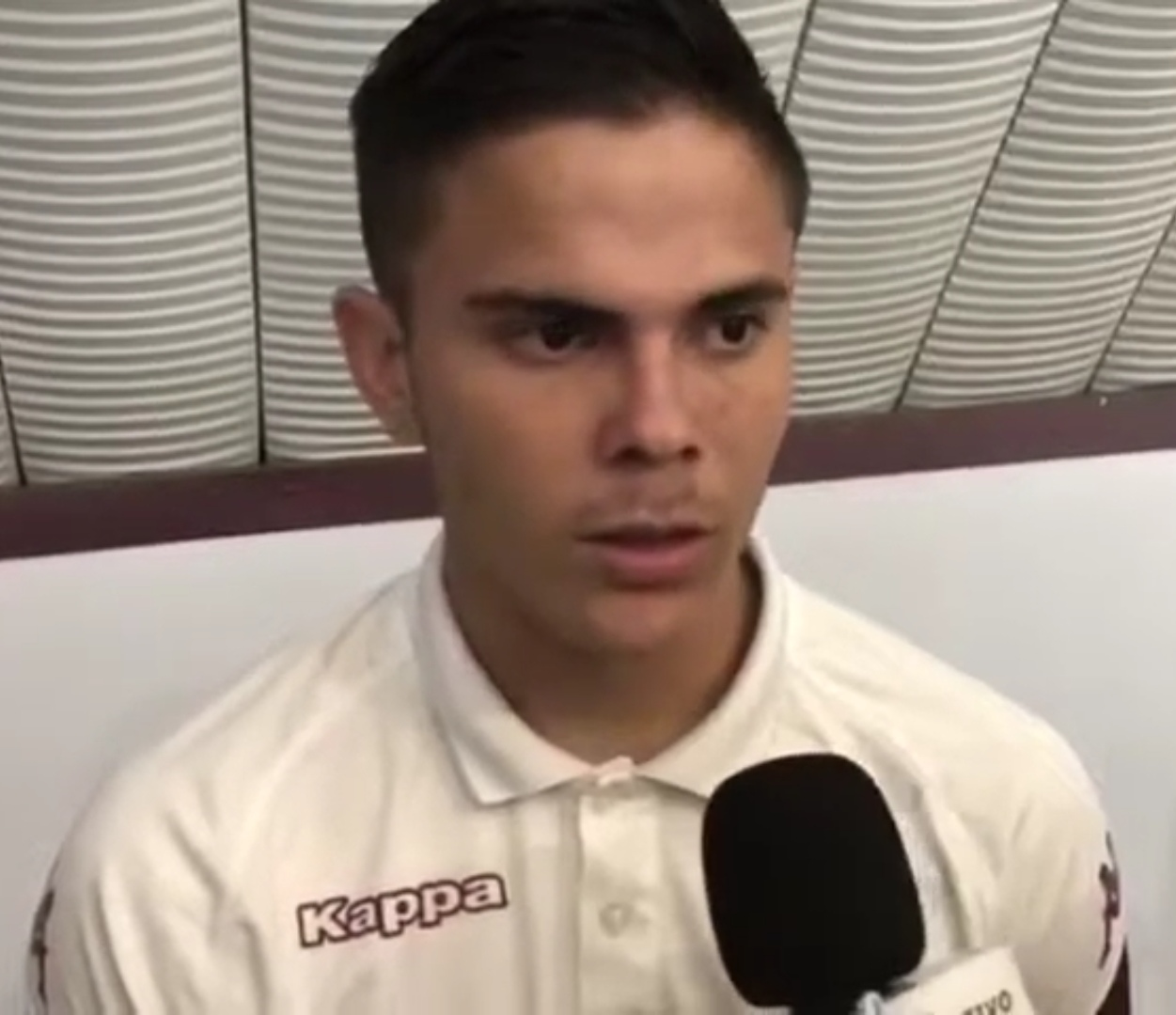

Personal information
- Full name: Suhander Manuel Zúñiga Cordero
- Date of birth: 15 January 1997 (age 29)
- Place of birth: San José, Costa Rica
- Height: 1.77 m (5 ft 9 1/2 in)
- Position: Defender

Team information
- Current team: Cartaginés
- Number: 24

Senior career*
Years	Team	Apps	(Gls)
2014–2019	Carmelita	102	(9)
2019	→ Deportivo Saprissa (loan)	21	(4)
2020–2022	Herediano	53	(4)
2022	→ Guanacasteca (loan)	21	(4)
2022–2023	San Carlos	16	(1)
2023	→ Alajuelense (loan)	33	(1)
2024	Alajuelense	12	(0)
2024–	Cartaginés	40	(0)

International career^{‡}
2017	Costa Rica U-20	1	(0)
2018	Costa Rica U-21	3	(0)
2021–	Costa Rica	9	(0)
- * Club domestic league appearances and goals as of 7 May 2025 ‡ National team caps and goals as of 10 September 2023 00:15 (UTC)

Suhander Manuel Zúñiga Cordero (born 15 January 1997) is a Costa Rican professional footballer who plays for Cartaginés of the Costa Rican First Division and the Costa Rica national team.

== Career ==
He made his senior league debut for Carmelita on 15 August 2014 against the Limón F.C. at the Morera Soto Stadium. In his debut season he made eighteen appearances. On 28 May 2015, he was awarded the Under-21 player of the season award.

On 7 January 2019, Zúñiga joined Deportivo Saprissa on a year-long loan. He scored his first goal for them on 24 July 2019 against Pérez Zeledón.

On 28 December 2019, he signed for Herediano. In June 2022, he signed for San Carlos. In December 2022, he signed on loan for Alajuelense.

== International career ==
He was selected to represent Costa Rica U-20 at the 2017 FIFA U-20 World Cup in South Korea.

He made his debut for the senior Costa Rica national football team in March 2021, against Bosnia.
