= El Gráfico (El Salvador) =

Sports newspaper of El Salvador

- Lo hacemos por deporte (English: We do it for sport)
- Type: Daily morning newspaper
- Format: Tabloid
- Founder: Jose Roberto Dutriz
- Editor-in-chief: Daniel Herrera
- Founded: 16 February 2004
- Language: Spanish
- Headquarters: Antiguo Cuscatlán
- City: San Salvador
- Country: El Salvador
- Circulation: 42,970
- Website: www.elgrafico.com

El Gráfico is a Salvadoran sports newspaper and the first of its kind founded in Central America. The newspapers target audience is males aged 13 to 45. El Gráfico is published daily as a morning edition in Spanish and reports on national and international sports. The newspaper is based in Antiguo Cuscatlán.

The name El Gráfico goes back to a newspaper that was founded by Pepe and José Roberto Dutriz in 1939. Today's sports newspaper first appeared in 2004 and currently has a circulation of around 50,000 copies a day. It is distributed all over El Salvador. The editorial team consists of around 20 full-time editors and six sports photographers. The editor-in-chief is Daniel Herrera.
