= Leonardo Menjívar =

Salvadoran football player (born 2001)

Personal information
- Full name: Leonardo José Menjívar Peñate
- Date of birth: 24 October 2001 (age 25)
- Place of birth: Chalatenango, El Salvador
- Height: 1.79 m (5 ft 10 in)

Team information
- Current team: Alianza

Youth career
- Chalatenango Reserve

Senior career*
Years	Team	Apps	(Gls)
2022-2023	Chalatenango	85	(7)
2023-2024	Alianza	20	(3)
2024	→ Alajuelense (loan)	8	(0)
2025-	Alianza	51	(8)

International career^{‡}
2019	El Salvador U17	6	(2)
2023	El Salvador U22	14	(0)
2021–	El Salvador	16	(0)
- * Club domestic league appearances and goals as of 8 January 2026 ‡ National team caps and goals as of 8 January 2026

Leonardo José Menjívar Peñate (born 24 October 2001) is a Salvadoran footballer who plays as a midfielder for Alianza and the El Salvador national team.

== Club career ==
Menjívar is a youth academy graduate of Chalatenango.

Menjivar was loaned to Costa Rican football club Alajuelense, His stay was somewhat short-lived, only playing 8 domestic league games, 1 domestic cup and 1 CONCACAF Central American Cup game, although the stay was short it was fruitful as Alajuelense won 1 Copa Costa Rica and 1 CONCACAF Central American Cup

Menjivar returned to Alianza

== Honors ==
Alianza

- Primera División Champion (4):

Alianza

- CONCACAF Central American Cup Champion (1): 2023
- Copa Costa Rica Champion (1): 2023
