= Bryan Landaverde =

Salvadoran football player (born 1995)

Personal information
- Full name: Bryan Balmore Landaverde Álvarez
- Date of birth: 27 May 1995 (age 31)
- Place of birth: Ilopango, El Salvador
- Height: 1.68 m (5 ft 6 in)
- Position: Midfielder

Team information
- Current team: Firpo
- Number: 8

Youth career
- 2010–2012: Turín FESA

Senior career*
Years	Team	Apps	(Gls)
2012–2014	Turín FESA	62	(1)
2014–2015	UES	20	(1)
2015–2016	Chalatenango	1	(0)
2016	Juventud Independiente	11	(0)
2016–2017	Firpo	52	(5)
2017–2019	Águila	33	(2)
2019–2024	FAS	139	(10)
2024–2025	Municipal Limeño	28	(1)
2025–	Firpo	60	(3)

International career^{‡}
2011	El Salvador U17	3	(0)
2014–2018	El Salvador U21	3	(0)
2015–	El Salvador	38	(1)
- * Club domestic league appearances and goals as of 18:55, 17 June 2025 (UTC) ‡ National team caps and goals as of 18:55, 17 June 2025 (UTC)

Bryan Balmore Landaverde Álvarez (born 27 May 1995) is a Salvadoran football player who plays as midfielder for Salvadoran Primera División club Firpo, and the El Salvador national team.

== Career ==
Beginning his career with Turín FESA in 2013, Landaverde began his senior career with stints at UES, Chalatenango, Juventud Independiente and Firpo On 26 December 2018, he transferred to FAS for the 2019 Clausura. He helped FAS win the 2021 Clausura and 2022 Apertura tournaments. On 30 December 2021, he extended his contract with FAS for 2 more seasons. On 31 December 2023, he signed with Municipal Limeño. On 5 January 2025, he once more returned to Firpo.

== International career ==
Landaverde played for the El Salvador U17s at the 2011 CONCACAF U-17 Championship. He represented the senior El Salvador national team for the 2023 CONCACAF Gold Cup. He again made the squad for the 2025 CONCACAF Gold Cup.

== Personal life ==
Landaverde grew up in a family of farmers. During the COVID-19 pandemic, Landaverde briefly returned to his family's farm to plant crops while the Salvadoran Primera División was on hold. His uncle Éder Renderos was also a professional footballer in El Salvador.

== Honours ==
Águila

- Primera División de Fútbol de El Salvador: 2018–19 Clausura

FAS

- Primera División de Fútbol de El Salvador: 2020–21 Clausura, 2022–23 Apertura
