= Daniel Hérelle =

French footballer (born 1988)

Personal information
- Full name: Daniel Julien Hérelle
- Date of birth: 17 October 1988 (age 38)
- Place of birth: Nice, France
- Height: 1.87 m (6 ft 2 in)
- Position: Midfielder

Team information
- Current team: Samaritaine
- Number: 17

Youth career
- –2005: Club Franciscain

Senior career*
Years	Team	Apps	(Gls)
2005–2008	Club Franciscain		
2008–2010	Samaritaine		
2010–2014	Club Colonial		
2014–2019	Golden Lion		
2019–	Samaritaine		

International career^{‡}
2006–2023	Martinique	97	(3)
- * Club domestic league appearances and goals ‡ National team caps and goals as of 10 September 2023

Daniel Hérelle (born 17 October 1988) is a French professional footballer who plays as a midfielder for Martinique Championnat National club Samaritaine. Born in Metropolitan France, he plays for the Martinique team at international level.

== Career ==
Hérelle was born in Nice, France. He made his debut for Martinique in 2006. He was in the Martinique Gold Cup squads for the 2013, 2017, 2019, 2021 and 2023 tournaments.
