= Mario González (footballer, born 1997) =

Salvadoran footballer born in 1997

Personal information
- Full name: Mario Antonio González Martinez
- Date of birth: 20 May 1997 (age 29)
- Place of birth: San Miguel, El Salvador
- Height: 1.82 m (6 ft 0 in)
- Position: Goalkeeper

Team information
- Current team: Alianza
- Number: 25

Youth career
- Dragón
- Chagüite
- LA Firpo

Senior career*
Years	Team	Apps	(Gls)
2018–2019	Firpo	32	(0)
2019–2020	Santa Tecla	7	(0)
2020–2025	Alianza	202	(0)
2026-	San Carlos	16	(0)

International career^{‡}
2017	El Salvador U20	6	(0)
2018	El Salvador U21	3	(0)
2019–2021	El Salvador U23	3	(0)
2021–	El Salvador	56	(0)
- * Club domestic league appearances and goals as of 27 May 2026 ‡ National team caps and goals as of 12:09, 27 March 2023 (UTC)

Mario Antonio González Martinez (born 20 May 1997) is a Salvadoran professional footballer who plays as a goalkeeper for Liga FPD club San Carlos and the El Salvador national team.

== Career ==
From San Miguel, El Salvador, the nephew of C.D. Dragón player Jorge Orlando "el Mingo" Martínez. Gonzalez played with C.D Dragón as a youth and was registered with them at sixteen years-old in the 2012–2013 season when they won the Segunda División de El Salvador. To get game time he went to C.D. Chagüite and then Firpo in the third division. He signed for Santa Tecla in 2019. Gonzalez signed for Alianza F.C. in June 2020 from Santa Tecla.

== International career ==
He made his debut for the full El Salvador team against the US Virgin Islands on 6 June 2021. He represented El Salvador at the 2021 CONCACAF Gold Cup. At the 2023 CONCACAF Gold Cup, Gonzalez reportedly made important saves to keep the score at 0–0 against rivals Costa Rica and to keep his country in the competition.

== Career statistics ==
As of 26 May 2025.

Club statistics
Club	Division	League			Cup		Continental		Total	
Club	Division	Season	Apps	Goals	Apps	Goals	Apps	Goals	Apps	Goals
Firpo	Primera División	2018-19	32	0	—		—		32	0
Santa Tecla	Primera División	2019-20	7	0	—		—		7	0
Alianza	Primera División	2020-21	30	0	—		1	0	31	0
Alianza	Primera División	2021-22	40	0	—		—		40	0
Alianza	Primera División	2022-23	32	0	—		5	0	37	0
Alianza	Primera División	2023-24	43	0	—		—		43	0
Alianza	Primera División	2024-25	40	0	—		4	0	44	0
Alianza	Total		185	0	0	0	10	0	195	0
Career total			224	0	0	0	10	0	234	0
