= Christian Martínez (footballer, born 1994) =

Footballer (born 1994)

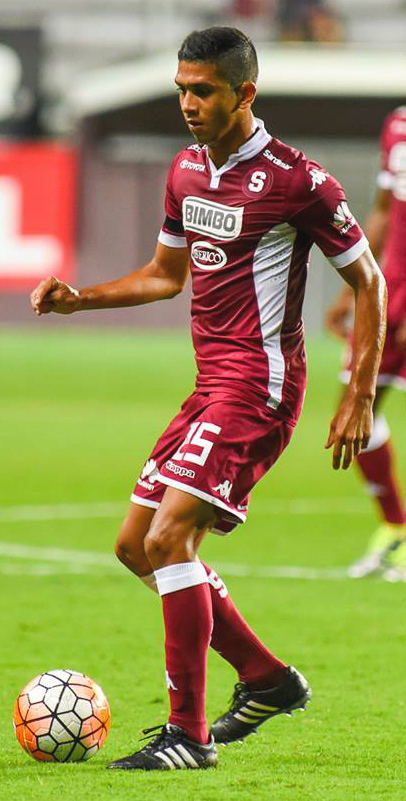
- Martínez with Saprissa in 2016

Personal information
- Full name: Christian Alonso Martínez Mena
- Date of birth: 19 April 1994 (age 32)
- Place of birth: Liberia, Costa Rica
- Height: 1.77 m (5 ft 10 in)
- Position: Defensive midfielder

Team information
- Current team: Cartaginés
- Number: 16

Youth career
- –2012: Liberia

Senior career*
Years	Team	Apps	(Gls)
2012–2016	Liberia	18	(1)
2016–2019	Saprissa	88	(1)
2019	→ San Carlos (loan)	16	(0)
2019–2023	San Carlos	142	(3)
2023–	Cartaginés	63	(0)

International career^{‡}
2015	Costa Rica U22	3	(0)
2015	Costa Rica U23	3	(0)
2021	Costa Rica	2	(0)
2021–	El Salvador	48	(0)
- * Club domestic league appearances and goals as of 27 March 2025 ‡ National team caps and goals as of 17 November 2026

Christian Alonso Martínez Mena (born 19 April 1994) is a professional footballer who plays as a defensive midfielder for Liga FPD club Cartaginés. Born in Costa Rica, he represents El Salvador at international level.

== Club career ==
Martínez began his career with his local club Municipal Liberia, making his first professional appearance in a 2–0 Liga FPD win over La U Universitarios on 2 August 2015. On 14 January 2016, he transferred to Deportivo Saprissa signing a 3-year contract. On 15 January 2019, he transferred to San Carlos. Martínez won 3 Liga FPD titles, 2 with Saprissa, and 1 with San Carlos - their first title in their history.

== International career ==
=== Costa Rica ===
Martínez was born in Costa Rica, and is of Salvadoran descent through his father. A youth international for Costa Rica, he debuted for the senior Costa Rica national team in a friendly 0–0 tie with Bosnia and Herzegovina on 27 March 2021.

=== El Salvador ===
Martínez switched to represent El Salvador in September 2021. He debuted in a friendly 2–0 loss to Guatemala on 24 September 2021.

== Career statistics ==
As of match played 17 November 2026

International statistics
National team	Year	Apps	Goals
Costa Rica	2021	2	0
Total		2	0
El Salvador	2021	7	0
El Salvador	2022	5	0
El Salvador	2023	13	0
El Salvador	2024	13	0
El Salvador	2025	1	0
El Salvador	2026	9	0
Total		48	0

== Honours ==
Deportivo Saprissa

- Liga FPD: 2016–17 Invierno, 2017–18 Clausura

San Carlos

- Liga FPD: 2018–19 Clausura
