= Jonathan Mexique =

Footballer (born 1995)

Personal information
- Date of birth: 10 March 1995 (age 31)
- Place of birth: Le Mans, France
- Height: 1.75 m (5 ft 9 in)
- Position: Midfielder

Team information
- Current team: Sochaux
- Number: 15

Youth career
- 2001–2006: ES Moncé
- 2006–2013: Le Mans

Senior career*
Years	Team	Apps	(Gls)
2012–2013	Le Mans II	1	(0)
2013–2019	Monaco II	59	(0)
2016–2017	→ Red Star (loan)	22	(0)
2017	→ Cercle Brugge (loan)	3	(0)
2018	→ Tours II (loan)	2	(0)
2018	→ Tours (loan)	5	(0)
2018–2019	→ Cholet (loan)	31	(6)
2019–2021	Cholet	49	(1)
2021–2023	Châteauroux	59	(3)
2023–2025	Nîmes	63	(3)
2025–	Sochaux	31	(1)

International career^{‡}
2011	France U16	7	(0)
2011–2012	France U17	7	(0)
2022–	Martinique	9	(1)
- * Club domestic league appearances and goals as of 23 June 2026 ‡ National team caps and goals as of 03:37, 5 July 2023 (UTC)

Jonathan Mexique (born 10 March 1995) is a footballer who plays as a midfielder for Ligue 2 club Sochaux. Born in metropolitan France, he plays for the Martinique national team.

== Club career ==
On 24 June 2021, he signed a three-year contract with Châteauroux.

On 27 July 2023, Mexique signed a two-year deal with Nîmes. On 13 June 2025, he joined Sochaux for two seasons.

== International career ==
Mexique was born in mainland France and is of Martiniquais descent. He is a former youth international for France. He was called up to the Martinique national team for 2022–23 CONCACAF Nations League matches in June 2022.

== Career statistics ==
=== Club ===
As of match played 11 December 2020

Appearances and goals by club, season and competition
Club	Season	League			National Cup		League Cup		Other		Total	
Club	Season	Division	Apps	Goals	Apps	Goals	Apps	Goals	Apps	Goals	Apps	Goals
Le Mans II	2012–13	CFA	1	0	—		—		—		1	0
Monaco II	2013–14	CFA	9	0	—		—		—		9	0
Monaco II	2014–15	CFA	22	0	—		—		—		22	0
Monaco II	2015–16	CFA	25	0	—		—		—		25	0
Monaco II	2016–17	CFA	3	0	—		—		—		3	0
Monaco II	Total		59	0	—		—		—		59	0
Red Star (loan)	2016–17	Ligue 2	22	0	1	0	0	0	—		23	0
Cercle Brugge (loan)	2017–18	First Division B	3	0	1	0	—		—		4	0
Tours (loan)	2017–18	Ligue 2	5	0	2	0	0	0	—		7	0
Tours II (loan)	2017–18	National 3	2	0	—		—		—		2	0
Cholet (loan)	2018–19	National	31	6	1	0	0	0	—		32	6
Cholet	2019–20	National	18	1	0	0	0	0	—		18	1
Cholet	2020–21	National	15	0	0	0	0	0	—		15	0
Cholet	Total		33	1	0	0	0	0	—		33	1
Career total			156	7	5	0	0	0	0	0	161	7

=== International goals ===
As of 2 October 2026

Goal	Date	Venue	Opponent	Score	Result	Competition
1.	2 October 2026	Stade Pierre-Aliker, Fort-de-France, Martinque	Honduras	2–1	2–1	2026–27 CONCACAF Nations League A
