= Jovani Welch =

Panamanian footballer (born 1999)

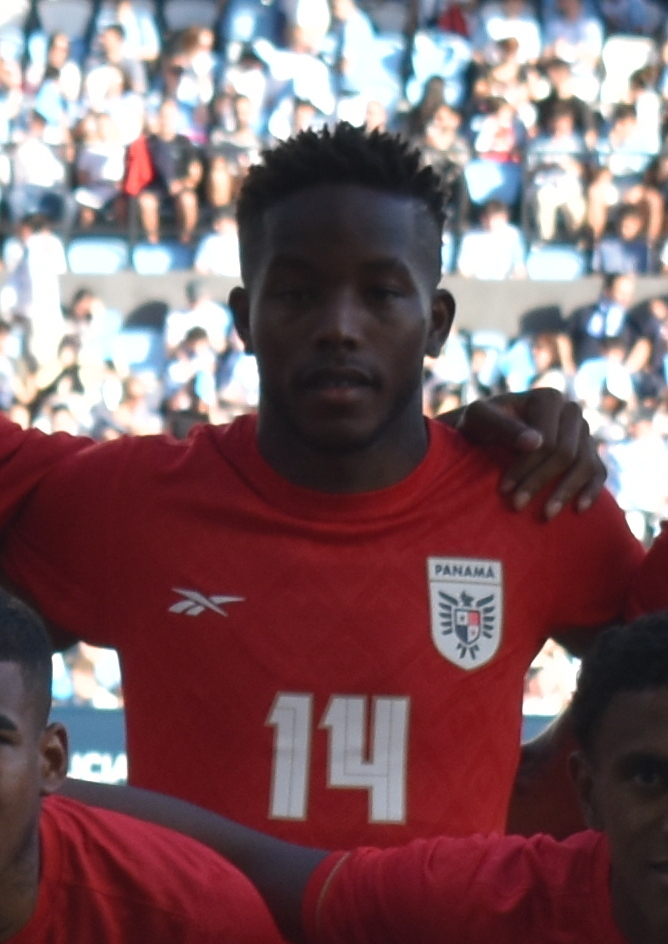
- Welch with Panama in 2024

Personal information
- Full name: Jovani Francisco Welch López
- Date of birth: 19 June 1998 (age 28)
- Place of birth: Panama City, Panama
- Height: 1.86 m (6 ft 1 in)
- Position: Midfielder

Team information
- Current team: Millonarios F.C.

Youth career
- –2018: Alianza

Senior career*
Years	Team	Apps	(Gls)
2018–2024	Alianza	73	(0)
2022	→ Zamora (loan)	31	(4)
2023-2024	→ Académico Viseu (loan)	15	(1)
2024-	Millonarios	0	(0)

International career^{‡}
2018–2019	Panama U20	4	(0)
2018–	Panama	16	(1)
- * Club domestic league appearances and goals as of 23 December 2022 ‡ National team caps and goals as of 10 June 2024

Jovani Francisco Welch López (born 7 December 1999) is a Panamanian professional footballer who plays as a midfielder for Categoria Primera A club Millonarios F.C. and the Panama national team.

== Club career ==
Born Panama City, Welch was formed at his city's club Alianza. He made his debut with the club on 24 February 2018 in a 2–2 draw against Chorrillo.

In February 2022, Welch joined Venezuelan Primera División side Zamora on loan. He appeared in 31 games during the 2022 season, helping his club finish at fourth place.

In January 2023, Welch was loaned to Académico de Viseu in the Liga Portugal 2. The loan was made extended for another season in July 2023.

In July 2024, Welch signed with Colombian club Millonarios

== International career ==
In 2019, Welch took part in the 2019 FIFA U-20 World Cup with Panama under-20s.

On 16 January 2022, Welch made his international debut with Panama national team in a 1–1 friendly draw against Peru.

In July 2023, Welch featured in the squad for the 2023 CONCACAF Gold Cup. He played in 3 games during the tournament as Panama finished as runners-up.

In June 2024, Welch was named in Panama's 26-men squad for the 2024 Copa América.

== Career statistics ==
As of match played 10 June 2024

Appearances and goals by national team and year
National team	Year	Apps	Goals
Panama	2022	4	0
Panama	2023	10	0
Panama	2024	2	1
Total		16	1

No.	Date	Venue	Opponent	Score	Result	Competition
1	10 June 2024	Nicaragua National Football Stadium, Managua, Nicaragua	Montserrat	1–0	3–1	2026 FIFA World Cup qualification

== Honours ==
Panama

- CONCACAF Gold Cup runner-up: 2023
