= Yannis Clementia =

Martiniquais professional footballer (born 1997)

Personal information
- Full name: Yannis Clementia
- Date of birth: 5 July 1997 (age 29)
- Place of birth: Fort-de-France, Martinique
- Height: 1.88 m (6 ft 2 in)
- Position: Goalkeeper

Team information
- Current team: Caen
- Number: 16

Youth career
- 2002–2012: Club Franciscain
- 2012–2013: Drancy
- 2013–2014: Arles

Senior career*
Years	Team	Apps	(Gls)
2014–2015	Arles II	2	(0)
2015–2019	Nice II	42	(0)
2019–2021	Nice	2	(0)
2021–	Caen II	16	(0)
2022–	Caen	19	(0)

International career^{‡}
2022–	Martinique	20	(0)
- * Club domestic league appearances and goals as of 23 June 2026 ‡ National team caps and goals as of 1 April 2025

Yannis Clementia (born 5 July 1997) is a Martiniquais professional footballer who plays as goalkeeper for Caen and the Martinique national team.

== Professional career ==
Clementia began playing football as a child with his local Martiniquais side Club Franciscain. After some trials in metropolitan France, he moved there in 2012 to continue his footballing career. On 14 May 2019, Clementia signed his first professional contract with OGC Nice. He made his professional debut for Nice in a 2–1 Ligue 1 win over Amiens SC on 10 August 2019. In June 2020, he was released by Nice at the end of his contract. On 3 February 2021, Clementia joined Ligue 2 side Caen on a free transfer until the end of the season. At 26, Yannis Clémentia achieved his first clean sheet in a professional championship.

== International career ==
Clementia was called up to represent the Martinique national team for a pair of friendlies in March 2022. He debuted with Martinique in a friendly 4–3 win over Guadeloupe on 26 March 2022.
