= Cristian Gil (footballer, born 1996) =

Personal information
- Full name: Cristian David Gil Hurtado
- Date of birth: 5 November 1996 (age 30)
- Place of birth: Cali, Colombia
- Height: 1.75 m (5 ft 9 in)
- Position: Forward

Team information
- Current team: LA Firpo
- Number: 19

Youth career
- Turín FESA

Senior career*
Years	Team	Apps	(Gls)
2015–2016	Vendaval Apopa		
2016–2017	Fuerte SF		
2017	El Roble de Ilobasco		
2018	Atlético Marte		
2018	Brujos de Izalco		
2019	Chalatenango	22	(5)
2019-2020	Platense		(19)
2020–2023	Isidro Metapán	72	(16)
2023	FAS	16	(1)
2023	Municipal Limeño	15	(5)
2024	Dragon	14	(2)
2025	INCA		
2025 - Present	LA Firpo	2	(0)

International career^{‡}
2021-	El Salvador	18	(3)
- * Club domestic league appearances and goals as of 30 March 2022 ‡ National team caps and goals as of 7 June 2022

Cristian David Gil Hurtado (born 5 November 1996) is a professional footballer who plays as a forward for Primera División club C.D. Luis Ángel Firpo. Born in Colombia, he represents the El Salvador national team.

== International career ==
Gil scored his first goal for El Salvador in a 2–1 2022 FIFA World Cup qualification loss to Costa Rica.

== Personal life ==
Hailing from a footballing family, Cristian Jr. is the son of former Colombian footballer Cristian Gil, as well as the brother of both Brayan Gil and Mayer Gil.

== Career statistics ==
=== Club ===
As of 30 March 2022

Club	Season	League			Cup		Continental		Other		Total	
Club	Season	Division	Apps	Goals	Apps	Goals	Apps	Goals	Apps	Goals	Apps	Goals
Chalatenango	2018–19	La Liga Mayor	22	5	0	0	–		0	0	22	5
Isidro Metapán	2020–21	La Liga Mayor	27	3	0	0	–		0	0	27	3
Isidro Metapán	2021–22	La Liga Mayor	28	10	0	0	–		0	0	28	10
Isidro Metapán	Total		55	13	0	0	0	0	0	0	55	13
Career total			77	18	0	0	0	0	0	0	77	18

=== International ===
As of match played 7 June 2022.

National team	Year	Apps	Goals
El Salvador	2021	1	0
El Salvador	2022	6	2
Total		7	2

==== International goals ====
Scores and results list El Salvador's goal tally first, score column indicates score after each El Salvador goal.

List of international goals scored by Cristian Gil
No.	Date	Venue	Opponent	Score	Result	Competition
1	27 March 2022	Estadio Cuscatlán, San Salvador, El Salvador	Costa Rica	1–1	1–2	2022 FIFA World Cup qualification
2	7 June 2022	Kirani James Athletic Stadium, St. George's, Grenada	Grenada	2–2	2–2	2022–23 CONCACAF Nations League A
