= Cristopher Núñez =

Costa Rican footballer (born 1997)

Personal information
- Full name: Cristopher Antonio Núñez González
- Date of birth: 8 December 1997 (age 28)
- Place of birth: El Guarco, Cartago, Costa Rica
- Height: 1.73 m (5 ft 8 in)
- Position: Midfielder

Team information
- Current team: Atromitos (on loan from Cartaginés)
- Number: 11

Youth career
- Cartaginés

Senior career*
Years	Team	Apps	(Gls)
2016–2021	Cartaginés	130	(16)
2021–2024	Lamia	102	(5)
2025–	Cartaginés	21	(3)
2026–	→ Atromitos (loan)	3	(1)

International career^{‡}
2017	Costa Rica U17	2	(0)
2019	Costa Rica U23	2	(0)
2020–	Costa Rica	15	(0)
- * Club domestic league appearances and goals as of 6 September 2026 ‡ National team caps and goals as of 10 June 2026

Cristopher Antonio Núñez González (born 8 December 1997) is a Costa Rican professional footballer who plays as a midfielder for Super League Greece club Atromitos, on loan from Cartaginés, and the Costa Rica national team.

== Club career ==
In June 2021, Núñez left his native Costa Rica and joined Greek Super League side Lamia. In July 2022 he signed a contract extension with the club through 2025.

== International career ==
A Costa Rica international since 2020, in June 2023 Núñez was named to the 24-man squad for the 2023 CONCACAF Gold Cup.

== Career statistics ==
=== International ===
As of match played 10 June 2026

Appearances and goals by national team and year
National team	Year	Apps	Goals
Costa Rica	2020	2	0
Costa Rica	2021	1	0
Costa Rica	2023	8	0
Costa Rica	2025	2	0
Costa Rica	2026	2	0
Total		15	0
