= A.D. San Carlos =

Association football club in Costa Rica

San Carlos
- Full name: Asociación Deportiva San Carlos
- Nickname: Toros del Norte (Northern Bulls)
- Founded: 9 May 1965; 61 years ago
- Ground: Estadio Carlos Ugalde Álvarez; Ciudad Quesada, Costa Rica
- Capacity: 5,600
- Chairman: Vacant
- Coach: Walter Centeno
- League: Liga Promerica
- Website: https://www.torosdelnorte.com/
Home colours	Away colours

Asociación Deportiva San Carlos is a Costa Rican professional football club based in Ciudad Quesada, the capital of San Carlos, Alajuela. They currently play in the Costa Rican First Division. Their home stadium is Estadio Carlos Ugalde Álvarez.

== History ==
The club was founded on 9 May 1965, after local clubs El Refugio and El Maravilla merged to become Selección de San Carlos and won promotion to the Primera División in 1965. They were relegated in 1971 and stayed in the Second División until returning at the top level in 1978. In 2004 they were relegated again after 25 years in the Primera, staying in the second tier for another two years. In May 2006 they beat Cartagena in a promotion playoff final and from 2006 through 2013 they were in the Primera before descending once more in 2013. They returned to the top flight in 2016, after defeating A.S. Puma Generaleña 3–2 on aggregate in the Segunda División final. However, the next season they got relegated again.

In 2018, San Carlos defeated A.D.R. Jicaral 5–4 on aggregate in another playoff final (their 6th second tier title) to return to the Primera División. In 2019, the club got its first top flight title by defeating Deportivo Saprissa in the final on away goals (1-1 aggregate), to become the first northern Costa Rica team to become champions.

== Current squad ==
As of 14 April, 2026

Note: Flags indicate national team as defined under FIFA eligibility rules; some limited exceptions apply. Players may hold more than one non-FIFA nationality.

No.	Pos.	Nation	Player
1	GK	ESA	Mario González
4	DF	CRC	Pablo Fonseca
5	MF	ESA	Christian Martínez
6	DF	CUB	Yosel Piedra
7	MF	CRC	Allen Guevara
9	FW	MEX	Brian Martínez
10	MF	CRC	Kenneth Cerdas
11	MF	CRC	Roberto Córdoba
12	DF	CRC	David Sánchez
15	MF	CRC	Abraham Carmona
16	DF	CRC	Gerardo Castillo
17	DF	CRC	Jordy Evans
18	FW	PAN	Jorman Aguilar
19	FW	CRC	Jonathan McDonald (retired now serving as DLM, Director Ligas Menores)

No.	Pos.	Nation	Player
20	DF	CRC	Reggy Rivera
21	FW	CRC	Jeikel Venegas
22	DF	CRC	Jean Carlo Agüero
23	GK	CRC	José Vega
26	MF	CRC	Osvaldo Rojas
30	FW	CRC	Dylan Masís
31	MF	CRC	Emmanuel Hernández
33	MF	CRC	Geison Castro
35	GK	CRC	Kendall Zúñiga
36	FW	CRC	Gregory Barquero
41	MF	CRC	Jorshuad Pilarte
70	FW	CRC	Cristopher Solano
88	FW	MEX	Raúl Vidal
92	DF	COL	Keiner Córdoba

== Current squad ==
As of 29 October, 2026

Note: Flags indicate national team as defined under FIFA eligibility rules; some limited exceptions apply. Players may hold more than one non-FIFA nationality.

No.	Pos.	Nation	Player
30	GK	CRC	Marianno Lugo Aguzzi (Dual nationality: USA)

== Honours ==
=== League ===
- Primera División de Costa Rica
  - Winners (1): Clausura 2019
- Segunda División de Costa Rica
  - Winners (6): 1965, 1977, 1978, 2006, 2016, 2018

== Championship Clausura 2019 ==
List of players and coaching staff who won the Costa Rica First Division National Soccer Championship on 2019.

Note: Flags indicate national team as defined under FIFA eligibility rules; some limited exceptions apply. Players may hold more than one non-FIFA nationality.

No.	Pos.	Nation	Player
1	GK	CRC	Alfonso Quesada
2	DF	CRC	Aaron Salazar
3	DF	CRC	Reggy Rivera
4	DF	CRC	Fernando Brenes
5	MF	CRC	Esteban Ramírez
6	MF	CRC	Carlos Acosta (Captain)
7	MF	CRC	Jose Luis Cordero
9	FW	CRC	Álvaro Saborío
10	MF	CRC	Diego Madrigal
11	MF	CRC	Roberto Córdoba
12	DF	CRC	Jose David Sánchez
14	FW	CRC	Marcos Mena
15	MF	CRC	Osvaldo Rodríguez
16	MF	ESA	Christian Martínez

No.	Pos.	Nation	Player
17	DF	CRC	Marvin Obando
18	DF	PAN	Daniel Ortiz
19	DF	CRC	Pedro Leal
20	MF	ARG	Ismael Gómez
21	FW	CRC	Rachid Chirino
22	GK	PAN	Alex Rodríguez
23	DF	ARG	Claudio Pérez
24	DF	CRC	Rudy Dawson
25	FW	CRC	Kevin Cunningham
27	FW	CRC	Albert Villalobos
29	FW	CRC	Juan Vicente Solís
30	GK	CRC	Jason Vega
31	GK	CRC	Marco Madrigal

== Top scores ==
Pos	Player	Goals
1	Juan Pablo Chacón	66
2	Álvaro Saborío	63
3	Ronald Vega	49
4	Gilbert Solano	47
5	Álvaro Sánchez	44
