= Martinique national football team =

Men's association football team

Martinique
- Nickname: Les Matinino (The Matinino)
- Association: Ligue de football de la Martinique (LFM)
- Confederation: CONCACAF (North America)
- Sub-confederation: CFU (Caribbean)
- Head coach: Fabien Mercadal
- Captain: Yannis Clementia
- Most caps: Daniel Hérelle (97)
- Top scorer: Kévin Parsemain (35)
- Home stadium: Stade Pierre Aliker de Dillon
- FIFA code: MTQ
| First colours | Second colours |

First international
- Barbados 3–2 Martinique (Martinique; 11 February 1931)

Biggest win
- Martinique 16–0 British Virgin Islands (Le Lamentin, Martinqiue; 5 September 2012)

Biggest defeat
- Mexico 9–0 Martinique (Mexico City, Mexico; 11 July 1993)

CONCACAF Gold Cup
- Appearances: 8 (first in 1993)
- Best result: Quarter-finals (2002)

CFU Championship / Caribbean Cup
- Appearances: 17 (first in 1983)
- Best result: Champions (1983, 1985, 1993)
Medal record
CFU Championship / Caribbean Cup
| Gold medal – first place | 1983 French Guiana | Team |
| Gold medal – first place | 1985 Barbados | Team |
| Gold medal – first place | 1993 Jamaica | Team |
| Silver medal – second place | 1994 Trinidad and Tobago | Team |
| Bronze medal – third place | 1988 Martinique | Team |
| Bronze medal – third place | 1992 Trinidad and Tobago | Team |
| Bronze medal – third place | 1996 Trinidad and Tobago | Team |
| Bronze medal – third place | 2001 Trinidad and Tobago | Team |

The Martinique national football team (French: Équipe de Martinique de football) represents Martinique (French overseas department) in men's international football and is controlled by the Ligue de Football de la Martinique (English: Martinique Football League), the local branch of the FFF. It has been a member of CONCACAF since 1964 (as an associate member) and obtained full membership in 2013. Regionally, it is also a member of CFU.

The association is not a member of FIFA. On 7 August 2010, the team adopted the nickname Les Matinino, which pays tribute to the history of the island.

== Overview ==
As an overseas department of the French Republic, Martinique is not a member of FIFA and is therefore not eligible to enter the FIFA World Cup or any competition organised first-hand by the organisation. Martiniquais, being French citizens, are eligible to play for the France national football team. Martinique is, however, a member of CONCACAF and CFU and is eligible for all competitions organised by either organisation. Indeed, according to the status of the FFF (article 34, paragraph 6): "[...]Under the control of related continental confederations, and with the agreement of the FFF, those leagues can organize international sport events at a regional level or set up teams in order to participate to them."

Martinique's highest honour to date was winning the Caribbean Cup in 1993. Martinique also was a two-time winner of the CFU Championship, a precursor to the Caribbean Cup. A more recent success was winning the 2010 Coupe de l'Outre-Mer. The team defeated Réunion 5–3 on penalties to claim the title. The Martinique team has participated in three CONCACAF Gold Cups and its best finish in the competition was in 2002 when the team reached the quarterfinals where they lost to Canada 6–5 on penalties.

== Team image ==
=== Kit sponsorship ===
| Kit supplier | Period |
|---|---|
| (France) Sport 2000 | 1981–1992 |
| (Germany) Adidas | 1993 |
| (Denmark) Select | 1994 |
| (Denmark) Hummel | 1995–2010 |
| (United States) Nike | 2013 |
| (Italy) Maps | 2014–2016 |
| (United States) Nike | 2017–2020 |
| (Guadeloupe) Ballers Pride | 2023–present |

== Results and fixtures ==
The following is a list of match results in the last 12 months, as well as any future matches that have been scheduled.

Win Draw Loss Fixture

=== 2025 ===
| 15 November 2025–26 CONCACAF Series | Martinique | 0–2 | Cuba | Santiago, Dominican Republic |
| | | Report | Matos 41'; Raballo 45' | Stadium: Estadio Cibao FC; Referee: Jefferson Escobar (Honduras) |

| 18 November 2025–26 CONCACAF Series | Dominican Republic | 0–0 | Martinique | Santiago, Dominican Republic |
| 20:45 UTC+8 | | Report | | Stadium: Estadio Cibao FC |

=== 2026 ===
| 22 February Friendly | Martinique | 0–2 | Jamaica | Fort-de-France, Martinique |
| 19:00 UTC−4 | | Report | Ellis 22'; Green 64' | Stadium: Stade Pierre-Aliker |

| 26 March CONCACAF Series | Martinique | 2–2 | Cuba | Santiago, Dominican Republic |
| 17:00 UTC−4 | Appin 26'; Antiste 42' | Report | Paradela 22'; Espino 50' | Stadium: Estadio Cibao; Referee: David Gómez (Costa Rica) |

| 29 March CONCACAF Series | Martinique | 0–1 | El Salvador | Santiago, Dominican Republic |
| 15:00 AST | | Report | M. Gil 90+2' | Stadium: Estadio Cibao; Referee: Jefferson Escobar (Honduras) |

| 25 September 2026–27 CONCACAF Nations League A | El Salvador | 3–1 | Martinique | San Salvador, El Salvador |
| 21:00 UTC−6 | M. Gil 8', 18' H. Osorio 29' G. Barrera (red card) 65' | Report | J. Antiste 51' J. Varane (red card) 66' | Stadium: Estadio Jorge "El Mágico" González; Attendance: 6,095; Referee: Pierre-Luc Lauzière (Canada) |

| 28 September 2026–27 CONCACAF Nations League A | Suriname | 2–1 | Martinique | Paramaribo, Suriname |
| 19:00 UTC−3 | Lonwijk 54'; Kerk 69' | Report | Moltenis 81' | Stadium: Dr. Ir. Franklin Essed Stadion; Attendance: 2,852; Referee: Adonis Carrasco (Dominican Republic) |

| 2 October 2026–27 CONCACAF Nations League A | Martinique | 2–1 | Honduras | Fort-de-France, Martinique |
| 20:00 UTC−4 | Varane 40'; Mexique 88' | Report | Puerto 8' | Stadium: Stade Pierre-Aliker; Attendance: 1,325; Referee: Kwinsi Williams (Trinidad and Tobago) |

| 5 October 2026–27 CONCACAF Nations League A | Martinique | 1–1 | El Salvador | Fort-de-France, Martinique |
| 18:00 UTC−4 | Antiste 56' | Report | Valladares 3' | Stadium: Stade Pierre-Aliker; Referee: Tori Penso (United States) |

| 12 November 2026–27 Nations League A/C Play-In | Aruba | 0–0 | Martinique | Oranjestad, Aruba |
| 15:00 UTC−4 | | Report | | Stadium: Trinidad Stadium |

| 16 November 2026–27 Nations League A/C Play-In | Martinique | 1–1 | Aruba | Fort-de-France, Martinique |
| 20:00 UTC−4 | Luydens 40' (o.g.) | Report | Martis 28' | Stadium: Stade Pierre-Aliker; Referee: Filip Dujic (Canada) |

== Players ==
=== Current squad ===
The following 25 players were called up for the 2026–27 CONCACAF Nations League A matches against Aruba in November 2026.

Caps and goals as of 17 November 2026, after the second match against Aruba.

| No. | Pos. | Player | Date of birth (age) | Caps | Goals | Club |
|---|---|---|---|---|---|---|
| | GK | Emmanuel Vermignon | 20 January 1989 (age 37) | 27 | 0 | (Ligue de football de la Martinique) Saint-Joseph |
| | GK | Yannick Etile | 8 March 2001 (age 25) | 2 | 0 | (French Football Federation) Chambly |
| | GK | Aldrick Boulois | 5 October 2001 (age 25) | 0 | 0 | (Ligue de football de la Martinique) Club Franciscain |
| | GK | Ryan Udino | 15 March 2003 (age 23) | 0 | 0 | (Ligue de football de la Martinique) Club Péléen |
| | DF | Karl Vitulin | 15 January 1991 (age 35) | 65 | 2 | (Ligue de football de la Martinique) Samaritaine |
| | DF | Florent Poulolo | 2 February 1997 (age 29) | 28 | 0 | (Romanian Football Federation) Universitatea Cluj |
| | DF | Joris Moutachy | 4 November 1997 (age 29) | 16 | 0 | (Lithuanian Football Federation) Kauno Žalgiris |
| | DF | Ghislain Arbaut | 16 August 1999 (age 27) | 9 | 0 | (Ligue de football de la Martinique) Assaut de Saint-Pierre |
| | DF | Davy Singama | 28 May 2001 (age 25) | 8 | 1 | (Ligue de football de la Martinique) Golden Lion |
| | DF | Kenny Lala | 3 October 1991 (age 35) | 5 | 0 | (French Football Federation) Brest |
| | DF | Harold Voyer | 26 March 1997 (age 29) | 3 | 0 | (French Football Federation) Le Mans |
| | DF | Yanis Lelin | 22 February 2002 (age 24) | 2 | 0 | (United States Soccer Federation) Chattanooga RW |
| | DF | Reudd Manin | 8 September 2001 (age 25) | 2 | 0 | (United States Soccer Federation) Charlotte Independence |
| | MF | Cristoph Jougon | 10 July 1995 (age 31) | 37 | 1 | (Ligue de football de la Martinique) Club Franciscain |
| | MF | Cyril Mandouki | 21 August 1991 (age 35) | 28 | 1 | (French Football Federation) Stade Lavallois |
| | MF | Patrick Burner | 11 April 1996 (age 30) | 19 | 4 | (French Football Federation) Nîmes |
| | MF | Tarik Cavelan | 26 September 2001 (age 25) | 18 | 0 | (Ligue de football de la Martinique) Samaritaine |
| | MF | Jonathan Mexique | 10 March 1995 (age 31) | 14 | 2 | (French Football Federation) Sochaux |
| | MF | Mathis Priam | 9 February 2002 (age 24) | 9 | 0 | (Ligue de football de la Martinique) Samaritaine |
| | MF | Jonathan Varane | 9 September 2001 (age 25) | 9 | 1 | (The Football Association) QPR |
| | FW | Johnny Marajo | 12 October 1993 (age 33) | 40 | 2 | (Ligue de football de la Martinique) Club Franciscain |
| | FW | Brighton Labeau | 1 January 1996 (age 30) | 30 | 8 | (Swiss Football Association) Thun |
| | FW | Enrick Reuperné | 3 August 1998 (age 28) | 26 | 0 | (Ligue de football de la Martinique) Golden Lion |
| | FW | Kevin Appin | 20 January 1998 (age 28) | 17 | 2 | (Royal Spanish Football Federation) Burgos |
| | FW | Janis Antiste | 18 August 2002 (age 24) | 8 | 3 | (Polish Football Association) Górnik Zabrze |
| | FW | Ludovic Blas | 31 December 1997 (age 28) | 6 | 0 | (French Football Federation) Rennes |
| | FW | Jessy Breslau | 6 August 2003 (age 23) | 1 | 0 | (Ligue de football de la Martinique) Samaritaine |
| | FW | Florian Fleury | 7 September 2003 (age 23) | 0 | 0 | (Ligue de football de la Martinique) Morne des Esses |

=== Recent call-ups ===
The following players have also been called up to the Martinique squad in the past 12 months and are still eligible to represent.

| Pos. | Player | Date of birth (age) | Caps | Goals | Club | Latest call-up |
|---|---|---|---|---|---|---|
| GK | Xavier Lenogue | 27 December 1996 (age 29) | 2 | 0 | (France) Boulogne | v. El Salvador, 5 October 2026 |
| DF | Ronny Labonne | 14 September 1997 (age 29) | 9 | 0 | (Romania) FCSB | v. Aruba, 12 November 2026 ^{PRE} |
| DF | Boris Moltenis | 8 May 1999 (age 27) | 10 | 1 | (France) Villefranche | v. El Salvador, 5 October 2026 |
| DF | Carlo Rabathaly | 16 April 2000 (age 26) | 7 | 1 | (Martinique) Diamantinoise | v. El Salvador, 30 March 2026 |
| DF | Marvin Bellance | 15 November 1998 (age 28) | 4 | 0 | (Martinique) Golden Lion | v. Cuba, 26 March 2026 ^{PRE} |
| DF | Adam Augustine | 23 January 2008 (age 18) | 0 | 0 | (Martinique) Morne des Esses | v. Cuba, 26 March 2026 ^{PRE} |
| DF | Redjani Marguerite | 30 January 2002 (age 24) | 0 | 0 | (Martinique) Club Franciscain | v. Cuba, 26 March 2026 ^{PRE} |
| DF | Dylan Agathine | | 0 | 0 | (Martinique) Diamantinoise | v. Jamaica, 21 February 2026 |
| MF | Daniel Hérelle | 17 October 1988 (age 38) | 96 | 3 | (Martinique) Saint-Joseph | v. El Salvador, 5 October 2026 |
| MF | Lucas Ardennes | 25 January 2001 (age 25) | 8 | 0 | (Martinique) Saint-Joseph | v. El Salvador, 30 March 2026 |
| MF | Norman Grelet | 14 July 1993 (age 33) | 8 | 0 | (Martinique) Golden Lion | v. Cuba, 26 March 2026 ^{PRE} |
| MF | Heinrich Méribault | 16 September 1998 (age 28) | 4 | 0 | (Martinique) Aiglon | v. Cuba, 26 March 2026 ^{PRE} |
| MF | Brian Ledoux | | 0 | 0 | (Martinique) Samaritaine | v. Jamaica, 21 February 2026 |
| MF | Matthew Mauzole | | 0 | 0 | (Martinique) Club Péléen | v. Jamaica, 21 February 2026 |
| FW | Alexandre Parsemain | 27 May 2003 (age 23) | 4 | 0 | (Switzerland) Lugano | v. El Salvador, 5 October 2026 |
| FW | Mickaël Biron | 26 August 1997 (age 29) | 17 | 7 | (Turkey) Batman Petrolspor | v. El Salvador, 30 March 2026 |
| FW | Kilian Polomat | 23 February 2001 (age 25) | 8 | 0 | (Martinique) Samaritaine | v. El Salvador, 30 March 2026 |
| FW | Gabriel Bilon | 19 December 1997 (age 28) | 5 | 1 | (Martinique) Golden Star | v. Cuba, 26 March 2026 ^{PRE} |
| FW | Brayan Henriol | 5 May 1999 (age 27) | 2 | 2 | (Martinique) Club Colonial | v. Cuba, 26 March 2026 ^{PRE} |
| FW | Lenny Lamorandiere | 27 May 2003 (age 23) | 0 | 0 | (Martinique) Saint-Joseph | v. Jamaica, 21 February 2026 |

== Player records ==
As of 25 March 2025
Players in bold are still active with Martinique.

=== Most appearances ===
| Rank | Player | Caps | Goals | Period |
|---|---|---|---|---|
| 1 | **Daniel Hérelle** | 97 | 3 | 2006– |
| 2 | Sébastien Crétinoir | 66 | 3 | 2004–2021 |
| 3 | Stéphane Abaul | 61 | 9 | 2010–2022 |
| 4 | **Karl Vitulin** | 60 | 2 | 2010– |
| 5 | Patrick Percin | 58 | 19 | 1998–2010 |
| 6 | Kévin Parsemain | 57 | 35 | 2008–2022 |
| 7 | José-Thierry Goron | 50 | 17 | 1998–2010 |
| 7 | Eddy Heurlié | 50 | 0 | 2001–2010 |
| 9 | Jordy Delem | 47 | 7 | 2012–2019 |
| 10 | Steeve Gustan | 44 | 9 | 2006–2013 |

=== Top goalscorers ===
| Rank | Player | Goals | Caps | Ratio | Period |
|---|---|---|---|---|---|
| 1 | Kévin Parsemain | 35 | 57 | 0.61 | 2008–2022 |
| 2 | Patrick Percin | 19 | 58 | 0.33 | 1998–2010 |
| 3 | José-Thierry Goron | 17 | 50 | 0.34 | 2002–2014 |
| 4 | Rodolphe Rano | 12 | 14 | 0.86 | 1996–2002 |
| 5 | Steeve Gustan | 9 | 44 | 0.2 | 2006–2013 |
| 5 | Stéphane Abaul | 9 | 61 | 0.15 | 2010–2022 |
| 7 | **Brighton Labeau** | 8 | 22 | 0.36 | 2022–present |
| 8 | **Mickaël Biron** | 7 | 17 | 0.41 | 2018–present |
| 8 | Jordy Delem | 7 | 47 | 0.15 | 2012–2019 |
| 10 | Yann Girier-Dufournier | 6 | 11 | 0.55 | 2003–2006 |
| 10 | Xavier Bullet | 6 | 29 | 0.21 | 2001–2008 |
| 10 | Gaël Germany | 6 | 34 | 0.18 | 2003–2014 |

== Competitive record ==
=== CONCACAF Gold Cup ===
Martinique has participated in eight of the seventeen CONCACAF Gold Cups contested. The team's first appearance in the competition was in 1993. The team was eliminated in the first round, however, not without procuring its first point in the competition after earning a 2–2 draw against Canada. Martinique's next appearance in the competition came in 2002. The team achieved its best performance reaching the quarterfinals where they lost to Canada 6–5 on penalties. The following year, Martinique appeared in the competition again, however, the team departed the tournament without scoring a goal.

| CONCACAF Championship & Gold Cup record | | | | | | | | | | Qualification record | | | | | |
| Year | Result | Position | Pld | W | D | L | GF | GA | Squad | Pld | W | D | L | GF | GA |
|---|---|---|---|---|---|---|---|---|---|---|---|---|---|---|---|
| (El Salvador) 1963 | Not a CONCACAF member | | | | | | | | | Not a CONCACAF member | | | | | |
| (Guatemala) 1965 | Not a CONCACAF member | | | | | | | | | Not a CONCACAF member | | | | | |
| (Honduras) 1967 | Not a CONCACAF member | | | | | | | | | Not a CONCACAF member | | | | | |
| (Costa Rica) 1969 | Not a CONCACAF member | | | | | | | | | Not a CONCACAF member | | | | | |
| (Trinidad and Tobago) 1971 | Not a CONCACAF member | | | | | | | | | Not a CONCACAF member | | | | | |
| (Haiti) 1973 | Not a CONCACAF member | | | | | | | | | Not a CONCACAF member | | | | | |
| (Mexico) 1977 | Not a CONCACAF member | | | | | | | | | Not a CONCACAF member | | | | | |
| (Honduras) 1981 | Not a CONCACAF member | | | | | | | | | Not a CONCACAF member | | | | | |
| 1985 | Not a CONCACAF member | | | | | | | | | Not a CONCACAF member | | | | | |
| 1989 | Not a CONCACAF member | | | | | | | | | Not a CONCACAF member | | | | | |
| (United States) 1991 | Did not qualify | | | | | | | | | 5 | 2 | 1 | 2 | 8 | 5 |
| (United States) (Mexico) 1993 | Group stage | 8th | 3 | 0 | 1 | 2 | 3 | 14 | Squad | 7 | 5 | 2 | 0 | 15 | 6 |
| (United States) 1996 | Did not qualify | | | | | | | | | 3 | 1 | 1 | 1 | 5 | 4 |
| (United States) 1998 | Did not qualify | | | | | | | | | 6 | 5 | 0 | 1 | 19 | 5 |
| (United States) 2000 | Did not qualify | | | | | | | | | 9 | 4 | 0 | 5 | 18 | 20 |
| (United States) 2002 | Quarter-finals | 6th | 3 | 1 | 1 | 1 | 2 | 3 | Squad | 7 | 5 | 1 | 2 | 20 | 5 |
| (United States) (Mexico) 2003 | Group stage | 12th | 2 | 0 | 0 | 2 | 0 | 3 | Squad | 6 | 3 | 1 | 2 | 16 | 10 |
| (United States) 2005 | Did not qualify | | | | | | | | | 5 | 2 | 2 | 1 | 7 | 3 |
| (United States) 2007 | Did not qualify | | | | | | | | | 9 | 5 | 1 | 3 | 11 | 12 |
| (United States) 2009 | Did not qualify | | | | | | | | | 5 | 3 | 1 | 1 | 10 | 6 |
| (United States) 2011 | Did not qualify | | | | | | | | | 3 | 0 | 1 | 2 | 1 | 3 |
| (United States) 2013 | Group stage | 10th | 3 | 1 | 0 | 2 | 2 | 4 | Squad | 11 | 5 | 5 | 1 | 34 | 10 |
| (United States) (Canada) 2015 | Did not qualify | | | | | | | | | 9 | 5 | 3 | 1 | 19 | 11 |
| (United States) 2017 | Group stage | 9th | 3 | 1 | 0 | 2 | 4 | 6 | Squad | 6 | 5 | 1 | 0 | 17 | 2 |
| (United States) (Costa Rica) (Jamaica) 2019 | Group stage | 12th | 3 | 1 | 0 | 2 | 5 | 7 | Squad | 4 | 4 | 0 | 0 | 10 | 2 |
| (United States) 2021 | Group stage | 15th | 3 | 0 | 0 | 3 | 3 | 12 | Squad | 4 | 0 | 3 | 1 | 4 | 5 |
| (United States) (Canada) 2023 | Group stage | 11th | 3 | 1 | 0 | 2 | 7 | 9 | Squad | 6 | 2 | 1 | 3 | 6 | 10 |
| (United States) (Canada) 2025 | Did not qualify | | | | | | | | | 6 | 1 | 2 | 3 | 4 | 7 |
| Total | Quarter-finals | 8/27 | 23 | 5 | 2 | 16 | 26 | 58 | | 111 | 57 | 26 | 28 | 224 | 126 |

*Draws include knockout matches decided via penalty shoot-out.
**Gold background colour indicates that the tournament was won. Red border colour indicates tournament was held on home soil.

=== CONCACAF Nations League ===
CONCACAF Nations League record
| League | | | | | | | | | | Finals | | | | | | | | |
| Season | Division | Group | Pld | W | D | L | GF | GA | P/R | Finals | Result | Pld | W | D | L | GF | GA | Squad |
|---|---|---|---|---|---|---|---|---|---|---|---|---|---|---|---|---|---|---|
| 2019–20 | A | C | 4 | 0 | 3 | 1 | 4 | 5 | Same position | (United States) 2021 | Did not qualify | | | | | | | |
| 2022–23 | A | B | 4 | 0 | 1 | 3 | 1 | 9 | Same position | (United States) 2023 | Did not qualify | | | | | | | |
| 2023–24 | A | A | 4 | 2 | 1 | 1 | 2 | 3 | Same position | (United States) 2024 | Did not qualify | | | | | | | |
| 2024–25 | A | A | 4 | 1 | 2 | 1 | 4 | 5 | Same position | (United States) 2025 | Did not qualify | | | | | | | |
| Total | — | — | 16 | 3 | 7 | 6 | 11 | 22 | — | Total | 0 Titles | — | — | — | — | — | — | — |

=== CFU Caribbean Cup ===
From 1978 to 1985, Martinique participated in the CFU Championship, a precursor to the Caribbean Cup. Of the six championships played, Martinique featured three final rounds. Les Matinino won the competition twice in 1983 and 1985. Martinique appeared in fourteen Caribbean Cups. The Martinique team was the organization with the smallest population to have won the competition. Martinique won their first and only Caribbean Cup title in 1993. The tournament was played in Jamaica and Martinique defeated the hosts 6–5 on penalties in the final match. The following year, Martinique finished runner-up to Trinidad and Tobago. The team finished in third place on three occasions in 1992, 1996, and 2001.

CFU Championship & Caribbean Cup record
| Year | Result | Position | Pld | W | D | L | GF | GA | Squad |
|---|---|---|---|---|---|---|---|---|---|
| (Suriname) 1978 | Did not qualify | | | | | | | | |
| (Suriname) 1979 | Did not qualify | | | | | | | | |
| (Puerto Rico) 1981 | Did not qualify | | | | | | | | |
| (French Guiana) 1983 | Champions | 1st | 3 | 2 | 1 | 0 | 5 | 1 | Squad |
| (Barbados) 1985 | Champions | 1st | 3 | 2 | 1 | 0 | 5 | 2 | Squad |
| (Martinique) 1988 | Runners-up | 2nd | 3 | 1 | 1 | 1 | 4 | 6 | Squad |
| (Barbados) 1989 | Did not qualify | | | | | | | | |
| (Trinidad and Tobago) 1990 | Abandoned (Note: Play was suspended when Jamaat al Muslimeen attempted a coup d'état of the government of Trinidad and Tobago. The tournament was abandoned altogether after Tropical storm Arthur forced the cancellation of the final round of games. Martinique were to meet Trinidad and Tobago in the final.) | | 2 | 1 | 1 | 0 | 4 | 2 | Squad |
| (Jamaica) 1991 | Round 1 | 5th | 3 | 1 | 1 | 1 | 4 | 2 | Squad |
| (Trinidad and Tobago) 1992 | Third place | 3rd | 5 | 2 | 1 | 2 | 10 | 6 | Squad |
| (Jamaica) 1993 | Champions | 1st | 5 | 3 | 2 | 0 | 8 | 3 | Squad |
| (Trinidad and Tobago) 1994 | Runners-up | 2nd | 5 | 3 | 1 | 1 | 12 | 10 | Squad |
| (Cayman Islands) (Jamaica) 1995 | Did not qualify | | | | | | | | |
| (Trinidad and Tobago) 1996 | Third place | 3rd | 5 | 2 | 1 | 2 | 6 | 4 | Squad |
| (Antigua and Barbuda) (Saint Kitts and Nevis) 1997 | Round 1 | 5th | 2 | 1 | 0 | 1 | 2 | 3 | Squad |
| (Jamaica) (Trinidad and Tobago) 1998 | Round 1 | 5th | 3 | 1 | 0 | 2 | 7 | 8 | Squad |
| (Trinidad and Tobago) 1999 | Did not qualify | | | | | | | | |
| (Trinidad and Tobago) 2001 | Third place | 3rd | 5 | 3 | 0 | 2 | 6 | 8 | Squad |
| (Barbados) 2005 | Did not qualify | | | | | | | | |
| (Trinidad and Tobago) 2007 | Round 1 | 6th | 3 | 1 | 0 | 2 | 4 | 8 | Squad |
| (Jamaica) 2008 | Did not qualify | | | | | | | | |
| (Martinique) 2010 | Round 1 | 7th | 3 | 0 | 1 | 2 | 1 | 3 | Squad |
| (Antigua and Barbuda) 2012 | Fourth place | 4th | 5 | 2 | 2 | 1 | 5 | 3 | Squad |
| (Jamaica) 2014 | Round 1 | 6th | 3 | 1 | 1 | 1 | 3 | 4 | Squad |
| (Martinique) 2017 | Fourth place | 4th | 2 | 0 | 0 | 2 | 1 | 3 | Squad |
| Total | 3 Titles | 17/25 | 57 | 25 | 13 | 19 | 83 | 70 | — |

== Honours ==
=== Regional ===
- CFU Championship / Caribbean Cup
  - (gold) Champions (3): 1983, 1985, 1993
  - (silver) Runners-up (1): 1994

=== Friendly ===
- Coupe de l'Outre-Mer (1): 2010
