= 2025 CONCACAF Nations League Finals squads =

2025 CONCACAF Nations League Finals

The 2025 CONCACAF Nations League Finals was the four-side final tournament of the 2024–25 CONCACAF Nations League held in the United States from 20 to 23 March 2025. The four national teams involved in the tournament were required to register a squad of 23 players, of which three had to be goalkeepers. Only players in these squads were eligible to take part in the tournament.

Each national team had to submit a preliminary list of up to 60 players (five of whom had to be goalkeepers) to CONCACAF no later than thirty days prior to the start of the tournament and players could not be added to these lists after the specified deadline. The final list of 23 players per national team had to be submitted to CONCACAF by 10 March 2025, ten days before the opening match of the tournament. All players in the final list had to be chosen from the respective provisional list. In the event that a player on the submitted final list suffered a serious injury or had medical reasons, he could be replaced up to 24 hours before the kick-off of his team's first match of the tournament, provided that it was approved by the CONCACAF Medical Committee. The replacement player had to come from the provisional list and would be assigned the shirt number of the replaced player.

CONCACAF published the preliminary rosters on 24 February 2025. The final 23-man rosters were published on 12 March 2025.

The age listed for each player is their age as of 20 March 2025, the first day of the tournament. The numbers of caps and goals listed for each player do not include any matches played after the start of the tournament. The club listed is the club for which the player last played a competitive match prior to the tournament. The nationality for each club reflects the national association (not the league) to which the club is affiliated. A flag is included for coaches who are of a different nationality than their own national team.

== Canada ==
Canada announced their 60-man preliminary roster on February 24, 2025. The final 23-man squad was announced on 12 March 2025. Zorhan Bassong was called up as an injury replacement for Richie Laryea on March 17.

Head coach: (United States) Jesse Marsch

No.	Pos.	Player	Date of birth (age)	Caps	Goals	Club
1	GK	Dayne St. Clair	9 May 1997 (aged 27)	9	0	(United States Soccer Federation) Minnesota United FC
2	DF	Alistair Johnston	8 October 1998 (aged 26)	51	1	(Scottish Football Association) Celtic
3	DF	Zorhan Bassong	7 May 1999 (aged 25)	2	0	(United States Soccer Federation) Sporting Kansas City
4	DF	Jamie Knight-Lebel	24 December 2004 (aged 20)	1	0	(The Football Association) Crewe Alexandra
5	DF	Joel Waterman	24 January 1996 (aged 29)	6	0	(Canadian Soccer Association) CF Montréal
6	MF	Mathieu Choinière	7 February 1999 (aged 26)	10	0	(Swiss Football Association) Grasshopper
7	MF	Stephen Eustáquio (vice-captain)	21 December 1996 (aged 28)	47	4	(Portuguese Football Federation) Porto
8	MF	Ismaël Koné	16 June 2002 (aged 22)	26	3	(French Football Federation) Rennes
9	FW	Cyle Larin	17 April 1995 (aged 29)	78	30	(Royal Spanish Football Federation) Mallorca
10	FW	Jonathan David	14 January 2000 (aged 25)	59	31	(French Football Federation) Lille
11	FW	Daniel Jebbison	11 July 2003 (aged 21)	0	0	(The Football Association) Bournemouth
12	FW	Tani Oluwaseyi	15 May 2000 (aged 24)	9	0	(United States Soccer Federation) Minnesota United FC
13	DF	Derek Cornelius	25 November 1997 (aged 27)	29	0	(French Football Federation) Marseille
14	MF	Jacob Shaffelburg	26 November 1999 (aged 25)	20	6	(United States Soccer Federation) Nashville SC
15	DF	Moïse Bombito	30 March 2000 (aged 24)	17	0	(French Football Federation) Nice
16	GK	Maxime Crépeau	11 April 1994 (aged 30)	24	0	(United States Soccer Federation) Portland Timbers
17	MF	Tajon Buchanan	8 February 1999 (aged 26)	43	4	(Royal Spanish Football Federation) Villarreal
18	GK	Tom McGill	25 March 2000 (aged 24)	0	0	(The Football Association) Brighton & Hove Albion
19	DF	Alphonso Davies	2 November 2000 (aged 24)	56	15	(German Football Association) Bayern Munich
20	MF	Ali Ahmed	10 October 2000 (aged 24)	12	0	(Canadian Soccer Association) Vancouver Whitecaps FC
21	MF	Jonathan Osorio	12 June 1992 (aged 32)	82	9	(Canadian Soccer Association) Toronto FC
22	FW	Promise David	3 July 2001 (aged 23)	0	0	(Royal Belgian Football Association) Union SG
23	MF	Niko Sigur	9 September 2003 (aged 21)	2	0	(Croatian Football Federation) Hajduk Split

== United States ==
The United States' 60-man preliminary roster was announced by CONCACAF on February 24, 2025. The final 23-man squad was announced on March 11, 2025. Defenders Antonee Robinson and Auston Trusty and midfielder Johnny Cardoso withdrawn from the squad due to injuries and were replaced by Max Arfsten, Brian Gutiérrez and Jack McGlynn on 18 March 2025.

Head coach: (Argentina) Mauricio Pochettino

No.	Pos.	Player	Date of birth (age)	Caps	Goals	Club
1	GK	Matt Turner	24 June 1994 (aged 30)	49	0	(The Football Association) Crystal Palace
2	DF	Cameron Carter-Vickers	31 December 1997 (aged 27)	18	0	(Scottish Football Association) Celtic
3	DF	Chris Richards	28 March 2000 (aged 24)	23	1	(The Football Association) Crystal Palace
4	MF	Tyler Adams	14 February 1999 (aged 26)	42	2	(The Football Association) Bournemouth
5	DF	Maximilian Arfsten	19 April 2001 (aged 23)	2	0	(United States Soccer Federation) Columbus Crew
6	FW	Yunus Musah	29 November 2002 (aged 22)	45	1	(Italian Football Federation) Milan
7	MF	Giovanni Reyna	13 November 2002 (aged 22)	31	8	(German Football Association) Borussia Dortmund
8	MF	Weston McKennie	28 August 1998 (aged 26)	58	11	(Italian Football Federation) Juventus
9	FW	Josh Sargent	20 February 2000 (aged 25)	27	5	(The Football Association) Norwich City
10	FW	Christian Pulisic	18 September 1998 (aged 26)	76	32	(Italian Football Federation) Milan
11	MF	Tanner Tessmann	24 September 2001 (aged 23)	6	0	(French Football Federation) Lyon
12	FW	Jack McGlynn	7 July 2003 (aged 21)	3	1	(United States Soccer Federation) Houston Dynamo FC
13	DF	Tim Ream (captain)	5 October 1987 (aged 37)	67	1	(United States Soccer Federation) Charlotte FC
14	MF	Diego Luna	7 September 2003 (aged 21)	3	0	(United States Soccer Federation) Real Salt Lake
15	MF	Brian Gutiérrez	17 June 2003 (aged 21)	2	0	(United States Soccer Federation) Chicago Fire FC
16	FW	Patrick Agyemang	7 November 2000 (aged 24)	2	2	(United States Soccer Federation) Charlotte FC
17	DF	Marlon Fossey	9 November 1998 (aged 26)	1	0	(Royal Belgian Football Association) Standard Liège
18	GK	Patrick Schulte	13 March 2001 (aged 24)	3	0	(United States Soccer Federation) Columbus Crew
19	DF	Joe Scally	31 December 2002 (aged 22)	19	0	(German Football Association) Borussia Mönchengladbach
20	DF	Mark McKenzie	25 February 1999 (aged 26)	17	0	(French Football Federation) Toulouse
21	FW	Timothy Weah	22 February 2000 (aged 25)	42	7	(Italian Football Federation) Juventus
22	GK	Zack Steffen	2 April 1995 (aged 29)	30	0	(United States Soccer Federation) Colorado Rapids
23	FW	Brian White	3 February 1996 (aged 29)	3	1	(Canadian Soccer Association) Vancouver Whitecaps FC

== Panama ==
Panama's 60-man preliminary roster was announced by CONCACAF on 24 February 2025. The final 23-man squad was announced on 12 March 2025.

Head coach: (Spain) Thomas Christiansen

No.	Pos.	Player	Date of birth (age)	Caps	Goals	Club
1	GK	Luis Mejía	16 March 1991 (aged 34)	53	0	(Uruguayan Football Association) Nacional
2	DF	César Blackman	2 April 1998 (aged 26)	28	2	(Slovak Football Association) Slovan Bratislava
3	DF	José Córdoba	3 June 2001 (aged 23)	21	0	(The Football Association) Norwich City
4	DF	Fidel Escobar	9 January 1995 (aged 30)	84	3	(Costa Rican Football Federation) Saprissa
5	DF	Edgardo Fariña	21 September 2001 (aged 23)	10	0	(Russian Football Union) Khimki
6	MF	Cristian Martínez	6 February 1997 (aged 28)	49	1	(Israel Football Association) Ironi Kiryat Shmona
7	MF	José Luis Rodríguez	19 June 1998 (aged 26)	53	7	(Mexican Football Federation) Juárez
8	MF	Adalberto Carrasquilla	28 November 1998 (aged 26)	62	2	(Mexican Football Federation) UNAM
9	FW	Tomás Rodríguez	9 March 1999 (aged 26)	4	0	(Venezuelan Football Federation) Monagas
10	FW	Ismael Díaz	12 May 1997 (aged 27)	42	9	(Ecuadorian Football Federation) Universidad Católica
11	MF	Edward Cedeño	5 July 2003 (aged 21)	0	0	(Royal Spanish Football Federation) Tarazona
12	GK	César Samudio	26 March 1994 (aged 30)	4	0	(National Autonomous Federation of Football of Honduras) Marathón
13	DF	Martín Krug	9 July 2006 (aged 18)	1	0	(Royal Spanish Football Federation) Atlético Levante
14	MF	Janpol Morales	22 June 1998 (aged 26)	1	0	(Ecuadorian Football Federation) Macará
15	DF	Jorge Gutiérrez	1 September 1998 (aged 26)	3	0	(Venezuelan Football Federation) Deportivo La Guaira
16	DF	Carlos Harvey	3 February 2000 (aged 25)	11	1	(United States Soccer Federation) Minnesota United FC
17	FW	José Fajardo	18 August 1993 (aged 31)	55	15	(Ecuadorian Football Federation) Universidad Católica
18	FW	Cecilio Waterman	13 April 1991 (aged 33)	41	11	(Football Federation of Chile) Coquimbo Unido
19	DF	Iván Anderson	24 November 1997 (aged 27)	12	1	(National Autonomous Federation of Football of Honduras) Marathón
20	MF	Aníbal Godoy (captain)	10 February 1990 (aged 35)	143	4	(United States Soccer Federation) San Diego
21	FW	Gustavo Herrera	18 November 2005 (aged 19)	1	0	(Mexican Football Federation) Puebla
22	GK	Orlando Mosquera	25 December 1994 (aged 30)	32	0	(Saudi Arabian Football Federation) Al-Fayha
23	DF	Omar Valencia	8 June 2004 (aged 20)	3	0	(United States Soccer Federation) New York Red Bulls

== Mexico ==
Mexico's 60-man preliminary roster was announced by CONCACAF on 24 February 2025. The final 23-man squad was announced on 10 March 2025.

Head coach: Javier Aguirre

No.	Pos.	Player	Date of birth (age)	Caps	Goals	Club
1	GK	Luis Malagón	2 March 1997 (aged 28)	7	0	(Mexican Football Federation) América
2	DF	Israel Reyes	23 May 2000 (aged 24)	18	2	(Mexican Football Federation) América
3	DF	César Montes	24 February 1997 (aged 28)	51	1	(Russian Football Union) Lokomotiv Moscow
4	MF	Edson Álvarez	24 October 1997 (aged 27)	82	5	(The Football Association) West Ham United
5	DF	Johan Vásquez	22 October 1998 (aged 26)	29	1	(Italian Football Federation) Genoa
6	MF	Érik Lira	8 May 2000 (aged 24)	5	0	(Mexican Football Federation) Cruz Azul
7	MF	Luis Romo	5 June 1995 (aged 29)	54	4	(Mexican Football Federation) Guadalajara
8	MF	Carlos Rodríguez	3 January 1997 (aged 28)	55	0	(Mexican Football Federation) Cruz Azul
9	FW	Raúl Jiménez	5 May 1991 (aged 33)	107	35	(The Football Association) Fulham
10	FW	Alexis Vega	25 November 1997 (aged 27)	33	6	(Mexican Football Federation) Toluca
11	FW	Santiago Giménez	18 April 2001 (aged 23)	32	4	(Italian Football Federation) Milan
12	GK	Raúl Rangel	25 February 2000 (aged 25)	2	0	(Mexican Football Federation) Guadalajara
13	GK	Carlos Moreno	29 January 1998 (aged 27)	0	0	(Mexican Football Federation) Pachuca
14	DF	Jesús Angulo	30 January 1998 (aged 27)	18	0	(Mexican Football Federation) UANL
15	DF	Ramón Juárez	3 May 2000 (aged 24)	0	0	(Mexican Football Federation) América
16	FW	Julián Quiñones	24 March 1997 (aged 27)	10	2	(Saudi Arabian Football Federation) Al-Qadsiah
17	MF	Orbelín Pineda	24 March 1996 (aged 28)	78	11	(Hellenic Football Federation) AEK Athens
18	MF	Luis Chávez	15 January 1996 (aged 29)	37	4	(Russian Football Union) Dynamo Moscow
19	DF	Rodrigo Huescas	18 September 2003 (aged 21)	2	0	(Danish Football Association) Copenhagen
20	FW	Efraín Álvarez	19 June 2002 (aged 22)	5	1	(Mexican Football Federation) Tijuana
21	FW	César Huerta	3 December 2000 (aged 24)	15	3	(Royal Belgian Football Association) Anderlecht
22	FW	Roberto Alvarado	7 September 1998 (aged 26)	48	5	(Mexican Football Federation) Guadalajara
23	DF	Jesús Gallardo	15 August 1994 (aged 30)	100	2	(Mexican Football Federation) Toluca
