= 2025 CONCACAF Nations League final =

Soccer match between international teams

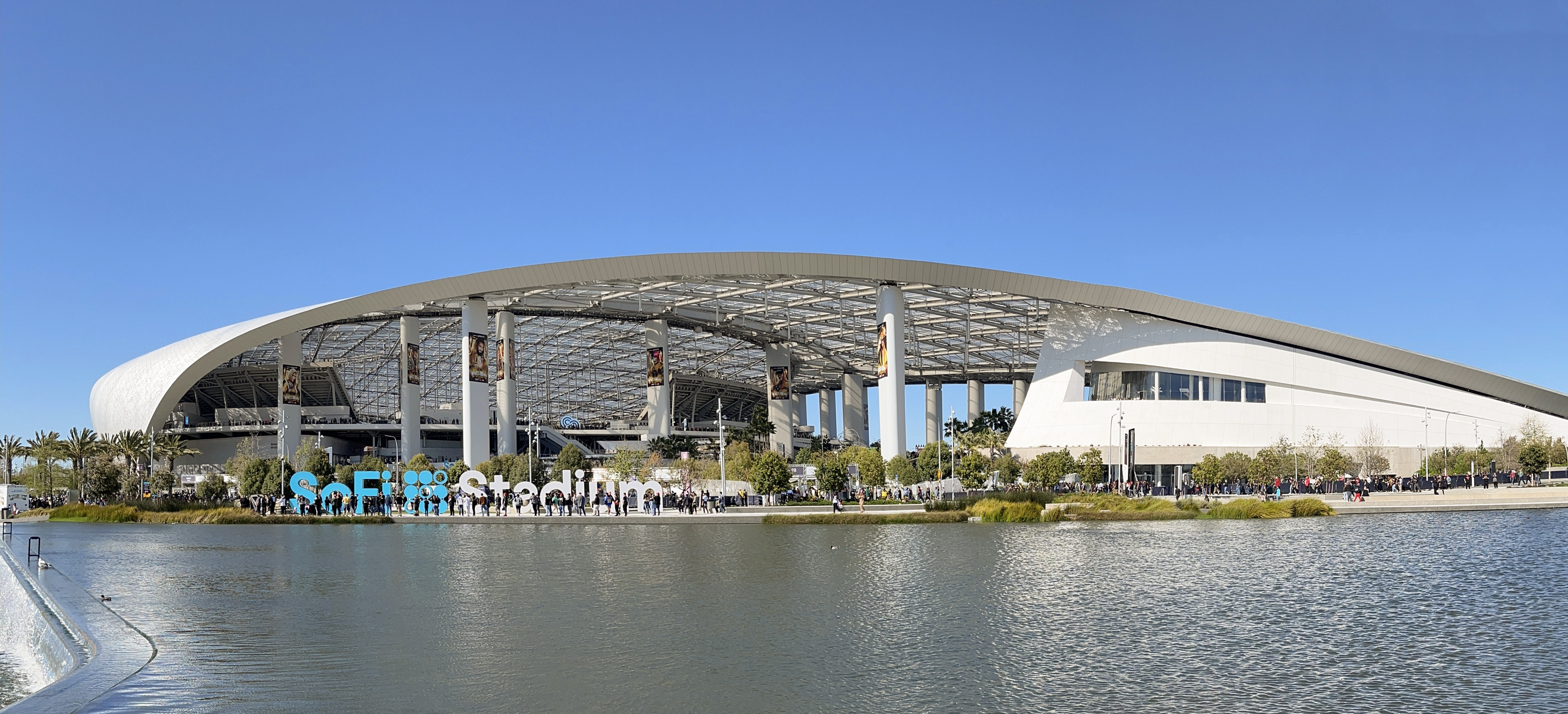
- SoFi Stadium, the host venue for the final
- Event: 2025 CONCACAF Nations League Finals
Mexico	Panama
(Mexico)	(Panama)
2	1
- Date: March 23, 2025
- Venue: SoFi Stadium, Inglewood, California, United States
- Man of the Match: Raúl Jiménez (Mexico)
- Referee: Mario Escobar (Guatemala)
- Attendance: 68,212

The 2025 CONCACAF Nations League final was a soccer match to determine the winner of the 2024–25 CONCACAF Nations League. The match was the fourth final of the CONCACAF Nations League, an international tournament contested by the men's national teams representing the member associations of CONCACAF, which covers North America, Central America, and the Caribbean.

== Venue ==
The match was played at SoFi Stadium in Inglewood, California, United States.

== Route to final ==
Note: In all results below, the score of the finalist is given first (H: home; A: away; N: neutral site).

Panama		Round	Mexico
Opponent	Result	Quarter-finals	Opponent	Result
Costa Rica	1–0 (A)	Leg 1	Honduras	0–2 (A)
Costa Rica	2–2 (H)	Leg 2	Honduras	4–0 (H)
Opponent	Result	Nations League Finals	Opponent	Result
United States	1–0 (A)	Semi-finals	Canada	2–0 (N)

=== Panama ===
Panama advanced to the final via the path above.

=== Mexico ===
Mexico advanced to the final via the path above.

== Match ==
=== Details ===
March 23, 2025
21:30 (18:30 UTC−7)

Mexico	2–1	Panama
Jiménez 8', 90+2' (pen.)	Report	Carrasquilla 45+2' (pen.)

SoFi Stadium, Inglewood
Attendance: 68,212
Referee: Mario Escobar (Guatemala)

Mexico	Panama

GK	1	Luis Malagón
RB	2	Israel Reyes
CB	3	César Montes
CB	5	Johan Vásquez
LB	23	Jesús Gallardo	(substituted off) 90+6'
RM	22	Roberto Alvarado
CM	7	Luis Romo	(substituted off) 63'
CM	4	Edson Álvarez (c)
LM	21	César Huerta	(substituted off) 64'
CF	11	Santiago Giménez	(substituted off) 90+6'
CF	9	Raúl Jiménez
Substitutions:
MF	18	Luis Chávez	(substituted on) 63'
FW	10	Alexis Vega	(substituted on) 64'
FW	17	Orbelín Pineda	(substituted on) 90+6'
DF	14	Jesús Angulo	(substituted on) 90+6'
Manager:
Javier Aguirre

GK	22	Orlando Mosquera
CB	16	Carlos Harvey
CB	5	Edgardo Fariña	(substituted off) 90+3'
CB	3	José Córdoba
RWB	2	César Blackman
LWB	15	Jorge Gutiérrez
RM	6	Cristian Martínez	(substituted off) 75'
CM	8	Adalberto Carrasquilla
CM	20	Aníbal Godoy (c)
LM	7	José Luis Rodríguez
CF	18	Cecilio Waterman	(substituted off) 62'
Substitutions:
FW	17	José Fajardo	(substituted on) 62'
MF	14	Janpol Morales	(substituted on) 75'
FW	10	Ismael Díaz	(substituted on) 90+3'
Manager:
(Spain) Thomas Christiansen

Man of the Match:
Raúl Jiménez (Mexico)

Assistant referees:
Luis Ventura (Guatemala)
Humberto Panjoj (Guatemala)
Fourth official:
Walter López (Guatemala)
Fifth official:
Keytzel Corrales (Nicaragua)
Video assistant referee:
Tatiana Guzmán (Nicaragua)
Assistant video assistant referee:
Benjamín Pineda (Costa Rica)

Match rules

- 90 minutes.
- 30 minutes of extra time if necessary.
- Penalty shoot-out if scores still level.
- Maximum of twelve named substitutes.
- Maximum of five substitutions, with a sixth allowed in extra time. (Note: Each team was given only three opportunities to make substitutions during the game, with a fourth opportunity in extra time, excluding substitutions made at half-time, before the start of extra time and at half-time in extra time (Regulations Article 12.19).)
