= 2025 CONCACAF Nations League Finals =

Tournament details
- Host country: United States
- Dates: March 20–23
- Teams: 4
- Venue: 1 (in 1 host city)

Final positions
- Champions: Mexico (1st title)
- Runners-up: Panama
- Third place: Canada
- Fourth place: United States

Tournament statistics
- Matches played: 4
- Goals scored: 9 (2.25 per match)
- Top scorer: (Mexico) Raúl Jiménez (4 goals)
- Best player: (Mexico) Raúl Jiménez
- Best goalkeeper: (Mexico) Luis Malagón

The 2025 CONCACAF Nations League Finals was the final tournament of the 2024–25 edition of the CONCACAF Nations League, the fourth season of the international football competition involving the men's national teams of the 41 member associations of CONCACAF. It was held from March 20 to 23, 2025 at SoFi Stadium in Inglewood, California, United States.

The three-time defending champions United States were eliminated by Panama in the semi-finals.

Mexico secured their first title by defeating Panama 2–1 in the final.

== Format ==
The Nations League Finals were contested by the four quarter-finals winners of League A. The tournament took place over four days and was played in single-leg knockout matches, consisting of two semi-finals on March 20, and a third place play-off and final three days after on March 23, 2025.

In the CONCACAF Nations League Finals, if the scores were level at the end of normal time, 30 minutes of extra time were played. If the score was still level after extra time, the winner was determined by a penalty shoot-out.

== Venue ==
Location of the host city of the 2025 CONCACAF Nations League Finals.

- 1 Inglewood

SoFi Stadium, located in Inglewood, California, in the Los Angeles Metropolitan Area, was announced as the venue for the 2025 and 2027 CONCACAF Nations League Finals on October 9, 2024.

City	Stadium
Inglewood (Los Angeles Area)	SoFi Stadium
Capacity: 70,240

== Qualified teams ==
The four quarter-finals winners of League A qualified for the Nations League Finals.

Match	Winners	Date of qualification	Appearances		Previous best CNL Finals performance	Rankings	
Match	Winners	Date of qualification	Total	Last	Previous best CNL Finals performance	CONCACAF Feb. 2025	FIFA Dec. 2024
QF1	Panama	November 18, 2024	3rd	2024	Fourth place (2023, 2024)	4	36
QF2	United States	November 18, 2024	4th	2024	Champions (2021, 2023, 2024)	2	16
QF3	Canada	November 19, 2024	2nd	2023	Runners-up (2023)	3	31
QF4	Mexico	November 19, 2024	4th	2024	Runners-up (2021, 2024)	1	19

== Seeding ==
The four teams were ranked based on their results in the two quarter-finals legs to determine the semi-final matchups. The first seed played the fourth seed and the second seed played the third seed.

Seed	QF	Team	Pld	W	D	L	GF	GA	GD	Pts
1	QF3	Canada	2	2	0	0	4	0	+4	6
2	QF2	United States	2	2	0	0	5	2	+3	6
3	QF1	Panama	2	1	1	0	3	2	+1	4
4	QF4	Mexico	2	1	0	1	4	2	+2	3

Source: CONCACAF
Rules for classification: Tiebreakers

== Squads ==
Each national team had to submit a final squad of 23 players, three of whom had to be goalkeepers, no later than ten days before the opening match of the tournament. If a player presented medical reasons or became injured severely enough to prevent his participation from the tournament before his team's first match, he could be replaced by another player.

== Bracket ==
Semi-finals
March 20 – Inglewood
Canada	0
Mexico	2
March 20 – Inglewood
United States	0
Panama	1

Final
March 23 – Inglewood
Mexico	2
Panama	1
Third place play-off
March 23 – Inglewood
Canada	2
United States	1

All match times are in EDT (UTC−4) as listed by CONCACAF (local times are in parentheses).

== Semi-finals ==
=== United States vs Panama ===
The teams had faced each other 28 times previously, but this was their first-ever meeting in the CONCACAF Nations League. Their most recent meeting was a friendly game in October 2024, won 2–0 by the United States, which marked the debut of coach Mauricio Pochettino at the helm of the USMNT. Meanwhile, their most recent competitive meeting was a 2024 Copa América Group C match on June 27, 2024, where Panama won 2–1.

March 20, 2025
19:00 (16:00 UTC−7)

United States	0–1	Panama
	Report	Waterman 90+4'

SoFi Stadium, Inglewood
Referee: Oshane Nation (Jamaica)

United States	Panama

GK	1	Matt Turner
RB	6	Yunus Musah
CB	3	Chris Richards	(yellow card) 72'	(substituted off) 79'
CB	13	Tim Ream (c)
LB	19	Joe Scally
CM	4	Tyler Adams
CM	11	Tanner Tessmann		(substituted off) 68'
RW	8	Weston McKennie
AM	10	Christian Pulisic	(yellow card) 90'
LW	21	Timothy Weah
CF	9	Josh Sargent		(substituted off) 68'
Substitutions:
FW	16	Patrick Agyemang		(substituted on) 68'
FW	12	Jack McGlynn		(substituted on) 68'
DF	20	Mark McKenzie		(substituted on) 79'
Manager:
(Argentina) Mauricio Pochettino

GK	22	Orlando Mosquera
CB	16	Carlos Harvey
CB	5	Edgardo Fariña
CB	3	José Córdoba
RWB	2	César Blackman		(substituted off) 80'
LWB	15	Jorge Gutiérrez
RM	6	Cristian Martínez		(substituted off) 90+2'
CM	8	Adalberto Carrasquilla
CM	20	Aníbal Godoy (c)
LM	7	José Luis Rodríguez		(substituted off) 90+1'
CF	17	José Fajardo		(substituted off) 70'
Substitutions:
FW	18	Cecilio Waterman	(yellow card) 90+6'	(substituted on) 70'
DF	19	Iván Anderson		(substituted on) 80'
FW	10	Ismael Díaz		(substituted on) 90+1'
MF	14	Janpol Morales		(substituted on) 90+2'
Manager:
(Spain) Thomas Christiansen

Man of the Match:
Cecilio Waterman (Panama)

Assistant referees:
Caleb Wales (Trinidad and Tobago)
Ojay Duhaney (Jamaica)
Fourth official:
Ismael Cornejo (El Salvador)
Fifth official:
Karen Díaz (Mexico)
Video assistant referee:
Daneon Parchment (Jamaica)
Assistant video assistant referee:
Benjamin Whitty (Cayman Islands)

=== Canada vs Mexico ===
March 20, 2025
22:30 (19:30 UTC−7)

Canada	0–2	Mexico
	Report	Jiménez 1', 75'

SoFi Stadium, Inglewood
Attendance: 50,295
Referee: Saíd Martínez (Honduras)

Canada	Mexico

GK	1	Dayne St. Clair
RB	2	Alistair Johnston	(yellow card) 33'
CB	15	Moïse Bombito	(yellow card) 18'
CB	13	Derek Cornelius
LB	19	Alphonso Davies (c)	(yellow card) 22'
CM	7	Stephen Eustáquio		(substituted off) 80'
CM	8	Ismaël Koné		(substituted off) 67'
RW	20	Ali Ahmed		(substituted off) 67'
AM	10	Jonathan David
LW	21	Jonathan Osorio		(substituted off) 60'
CF	9	Cyle Larin		(substituted off) 79'
Substitutions:
MF	14	Jacob Shaffelburg		(substituted on) 60'
MF	17	Tajon Buchanan		(substituted on) 67'
MF	6	Mathieu Choinière		(substituted on) 67'
FW	12	Tani Oluwaseyi		(substituted on) 79'
FW	11	Daniel Jebbison		(substituted on) 80'
Manager:
(United States) Jesse Marsch

GK	1	Luis Malagón
CB	2	Israel Reyes	(yellow card) 71'
CB	4	Edson Álvarez (c)
CB	5	Johan Vásquez	(yellow card) 43'
RM	22	Roberto Alvarado
CM	8	Carlos Rodríguez		(substituted off) 54'
CM	6	Érik Lira		(substituted off) 89'
LM	23	Jesús Gallardo
RF	11	Santiago Giménez		(substituted off) 80'
CF	9	Raúl Jiménez
LF	10	Alexis Vega	(yellow card) 27'	(substituted off) 54'
Substitutions:
FW	21	César Huerta		(substituted on) 54'
MF	7	Luis Romo		(substituted on) 54'
FW	16	Julián Quiñones		(substituted on) 80'
MF	18	Luis Chávez		(substituted on) 89'
Manager:
Javier Aguirre

Man of the Match:
Raúl Jiménez (Mexico)

Assistant referees:
Walter López (Honduras)
Christian Ramírez (Honduras)
Fourth official:
Selvin Brown (Honduras)
Fifth official:
Humberto Panjoj (Guatemala)
Video assistant referee:
Benjamín Pineda (Costa Rica)
Assistant video assistant referee:
Jesús Montero (Costa Rica)

== Third place play-off ==
The teams had met in 43 previous matches, including three times at the CONCACAF Nations League (CNL) with one victory per side in the group stage of the 2019–20 League A and the United States' 2–0 triumph in the final of the 2022–23 edition. Their most recent meeting was a friendly game won 2–1 by Canada in September 2024.

March 23, 2025
18:00 (15:00 UTC−7)

Canada	2–1	United States
Oluwaseyi 27'; J. David 59'	Report	Agyemang 35'

SoFi Stadium, Inglewood
Referee: Katia García (Mexico)

Canada	United States

GK	1	Dayne St. Clair
RB	2	Alistair Johnston
CB	15	Moïse Bombito	(yellow card) 43'
CB	13	Derek Cornelius
LB	19	Alphonso Davies (c)		(substituted off) 11'
CM	6	Mathieu Choinière		(substituted off) 87'
CM	8	Ismaël Koné	(yellow card) 67'
RW	20	Ali Ahmed		(substituted off) 87'
AM	10	Jonathan David
LW	17	Tajon Buchanan		(substituted off) 66'
CF	12	Tani Oluwaseyi		(substituted off) 66'
Substitutions:
MF	23	Niko Sigur		(substituted on) 11'
FW	9	Cyle Larin		(substituted on) 66'
MF	14	Jacob Shaffelburg		(substituted on) 66'
MF	7	Stephen Eustáquio		(substituted on) 87'
MF	21	Jonathan Osorio		(substituted on) 87'
Manager:
(United States) Jesse Marsch			(red card) 54'

GK	1	Matt Turner
RB	5	Maximilian Arfsten
CB	20	Mark McKenzie
CB	2	Cameron Carter-Vickers
LB	19	Joe Scally	(yellow card) 30'	(substituted off) 46'
CM	4	Tyler Adams		(substituted off) 69'
CM	8	Weston McKennie		(substituted off) 69'
RW	14	Diego Luna
AM	10	Christian Pulisic (c)		(substituted off) 69'
LW	21	Timothy Weah
CF	16	Patrick Agyemang		(substituted off) 78'
Substitutions:
DF	17	Marlon Fossey		(substituted on) 46'
MF	11	Tanner Tessmann		(substituted on) 69'
FW	6	Yunus Musah		(substituted on) 69'
MF	7	Giovanni Reyna	(yellow card) 90+6'	(substituted on) 69'
FW	23	Brian White		(substituted on) 78'
Manager:
(Argentina) Mauricio Pochettino

Man of the Match:
Jonathan David (Canada)

Assistant referees:
Sandra Ramírez (Mexico)
Karen Díaz (Mexico)
Fourth official:
Keylor Herrera (Costa Rica)
Fifth official:

Video assistant referee:
Guillermo Pacheco (Mexico)
Assistant video assistant referee:
Jesús Montero (Costa Rica)

== Final ==
The teams had met 30 times previously, including four CONCACAF Nations League (CNL) matches, all won by Mexico: 3–1 and 3–0 in the group stage of the 2019–20 League A, 1–0 in the third place play-off of the 2023 Finals and a 3–0 semi-finals win in the 2024 Finals, with the latter being their most recent encounter.

This was the third Nations League final for Mexico, while Panama was the first Central American nation to reach the deciding match of the competition. The match crowned an unprecedented Nations League winner after the elimination of the three-time defending champions United States in the semi-finals.

23 March 2025
21:30 (18:30 UTC−7)

Mexico	2–1	Panama
Jiménez 8', 90+2' (pen.)	Report	Carrasquilla 45+2' (pen.)

SoFi Stadium, Inglewood
Attendance: 68,212
Referee: Mario Escobar (Guatemala)

Mexico	Panama

GK	1	Luis Malagón
RB	2	Israel Reyes
CB	3	César Montes
CB	5	Johan Vásquez
LB	23	Jesús Gallardo	(substituted off) 90+6'
RM	22	Roberto Alvarado
CM	7	Luis Romo	(substituted off) 63'
CM	4	Edson Álvarez (c)
LM	21	César Huerta	(substituted off) 64'
CF	11	Santiago Giménez	(substituted off) 90+6'
CF	9	Raúl Jiménez
Substitutions:
MF	18	Luis Chávez	(substituted on) 63'
FW	10	Alexis Vega	(substituted on) 64'
FW	17	Orbelín Pineda	(substituted on) 90+6'
DF	14	Jesús Angulo	(substituted on) 90+6'
Manager:
Javier Aguirre

GK	22	Orlando Mosquera
CB	16	Carlos Harvey
CB	5	Edgardo Fariña	(substituted off) 90+3'
CB	3	José Córdoba
RWB	2	César Blackman
LWB	15	Jorge Gutiérrez
RM	6	Cristian Martínez	(substituted off) 75'
CM	8	Adalberto Carrasquilla
CM	20	Aníbal Godoy (c)
LM	7	José Luis Rodríguez
CF	18	Cecilio Waterman	(substituted off) 62'
Substitutions:
FW	17	José Fajardo	(substituted on) 62'
MF	14	Janpol Morales	(substituted on) 75'
FW	10	Ismael Díaz	(substituted on) 90+3'
Manager:
(Spain) Thomas Christiansen

Man of the Match:
Raúl Jiménez (Mexico)

Assistant referees:
Luis Ventura (Guatemala)
Humberto Panjoj (Guatemala)
Fourth official:
Walter López (Guatemala)
Fifth official:
Keytzel Corrales (Nicaragua)
Video assistant referee:
Tatiana Guzmán (Nicaragua)
Assistant video assistant referee:
Benjamín Pineda (Costa Rica)

== Statistics ==
=== Goalscorers ===
There were 9 goals scored in 4 matches, for an average of 2.25 goals per match.

4 goals

- (Mexico) Raúl Jiménez

1 goal

- (Canada) Jonathan David
- (Canada) Tani Oluwaseyi
- (Panama) Adalberto Carrasquilla
- (Panama) Cecilio Waterman
- (United States) Patrick Agyemang

== Awards ==
CONCACAF announced the following squad as the best eleven of the Finals after the conclusion of the tournament.

Raúl Jiménez was named best player of the tournament, scoring four goals in the Finals. Luis Malagón was named best goalkeeper, with four saves and one clean sheet.

Best XI

Goalkeeper	Defenders	Midfielders	Forwards
(Mexico) Luis Malagón	(Mexico) Israel Reyes (Canada) Moïse Bombito (Mexico) Johan Vásquez	(United States) Tyler Adams (Mexico) Edson Álvarez (Panama) Aníbal Godoy (Panama) Adalberto Carrasquilla	(Canada) Jonathan David (Panama) Cecilio Waterman (Mexico) Raúl Jiménez

== Controversy ==
In the 9th minute of the semi-final game between Mexico and Canada, Mexico's Edson Álvarez kicked Canada's Derek Cornelius on his foot inside Mexico's penalty box, but the referee Saíd Martínez did not award a penalty kick to Canada. A free kick was given in favor of Mexico instead. The VAR Benjamín Pineda did not intervene.
