= 2024 CONCACAF Nations League Finals =

Tournament details
- Host country: United States
- Dates: March 21–24
- Teams: 4
- Venue: 1 (in 1 host city)

Final positions
- Champions: United States (3rd title)
- Runners-up: Mexico
- Third place: Jamaica
- Fourth place: Panama

Tournament statistics
- Matches played: 4
- Goals scored: 10 (2.5 per match)
- Top scorer(s): (United States) Haji Wright (2 goals)
- Best player: (United States) Giovanni Reyna
- Best goalkeeper: (United States) Matt Turner

The 2024 CONCACAF Nations League Finals was the final tournament of the 2023–24 edition of the CONCACAF Nations League, the third season of the international football competition involving the men's national teams of the 41 member associations of CONCACAF. It was held from March 21 to 24, 2024, at AT&T Stadium in Arlington, Texas, United States.

The United States defeated Mexico 2–0 in the final to secure a third consecutive CONCACAF Nations League title.

== Format ==
The Nations League Finals was contested by the four quarter-finals winners of League A. The tournament took place over four days and was played in single-leg knockout matches, consisting of two semi-finals on March 21, and a third place play-off and final three days after the second semi-final on March 24, 2024.

In the CONCACAF Nations League Finals, if the scores were level at the end of normal time:

- In the semi-finals and final, 30 minutes of extra time were played. If the score was still level after extra time, the winner was determined by a penalty shoot-out.
- In the third place play-off, extra time was not played, and the winner was determined by a penalty shoot-out.

== Venue ==
AT&T Stadium in Arlington, Texas, within the Dallas-Fort Worth Area, was announced as the venue for the event on November 13, 2023.

Location of the host city of the 2024 CONCACAF Nations League Finals.

- 1 Arlington

City	Stadium
Arlington (Dallas–Fort Worth Area)	AT&T Stadium
Capacity: 80,000

== Qualified teams ==
The four quarter-finals winners of League A qualified for the Nations League Finals.

Match	Winners	Date of qualification	Appearances		Previous best CNL Finals performance	Rankings	
Match	Winners	Date of qualification	Total	Last	Previous best CNL Finals performance	CONCACAF Feb. 2024	FIFA Feb. 2024
QF1	Panama	November 20, 2023	2nd	2023	Fourth place (2023)	3	44
QF2	Jamaica	November 21, 2023	1st	None	Debut	6	57
QF3	United States (host)	November 20, 2023	3rd	2023	Champions (2021, 2023)	2	13
QF4	Mexico	November 21, 2023	3rd	2023	Runners-up (2021)	1	15

== Seeding ==
The four teams were ranked based on their results in both legs of the quarter-finals to determine the semi-final matchups. The first seed played the fourth seed and the second seed played the third seed.

Seed	QF	Team	Pld	W	D	L	GF	GA	GD	Pts
1	1	Panama	2	2	0	0	6	1	+5	6
2	3	United States	2	1	0	1	4	2	+2	3
3	2	Jamaica	2	1	0	1	4	4	0	3
4	4	Mexico	2	1	0	1	2	2	0	3

Source: CONCACAF
Rules for classification: Tiebreakers

== Squads ==
Each national team had to submit a final squad of 23 players, three of whom had to be goalkeepers, no later than ten days before the opening match of the tournament. If a player presented medical reasons or became injured severely enough to prevent his participation from the tournament before his team's first match, he could be replaced by another player.

== Bracket ==
Semi-finals
March 21 – Arlington
Panama	0
Mexico	3
March 21 – Arlington
United States (a.e.t.)	3
Jamaica	1

Final
March 24 – Arlington
Mexico	0
United States	2
Third place play-off
March 24 – Arlington
Panama	0
Jamaica	1

All match times are in EDT (UTC−4) as listed by CONCACAF (local times are in parentheses).

== Semi-finals ==
=== United States vs Jamaica ===
The two teams had met 32 times previously, but this was their first ever meeting in the CONCACAF Nations League. The United States led the all-time series with 19 wins to Jamaica's 3 wins and 10 draws. Their most recent meeting was a 1–1 group stage draw in the 2023 CONCACAF Gold Cup.

March 21, 2024
19:00 (18:00 UTC−5)

United States	3–1 (a.e.t.)	Jamaica
Burke 90+6' (o.g.); Wright 96', 109'	Report	Leigh 1'

AT&T Stadium, Arlington
Attendance: 40,926
Referee: Selvin Brown (Honduras)

United States	Jamaica

GK	1	Matt Turner
RB	19	Joe Scally	(yellow card) 12'	(substituted off) 46'
CB	12	Miles Robinson
CB	3	Chris Richards
LB	5	Antonee Robinson
DM	6	Yunus Musah
CM	17	Malik Tillman		(substituted off) 76'
CM	8	Weston McKennie
RF	21	Timothy Weah		(substituted off) 63'
CF	20	Folarin Balogun		(substituted off) 63'
LF	10	Christian Pulisic (c)
Substitutions:
MF	7	Giovanni Reyna		(substituted on) 46'
FW	14	Haji Wright		(substituted on) 63'
FW	9	Ricardo Pepi		(substituted on) 63'
MF	4	Tyler Adams		(substituted on) 63' (substituted off) 100'
FW	11	Brenden Aaronson		(substituted on) 76'
MF	15	Johnny Cardoso		(substituted on) 100'
Manager:
Gregg Berhalter

GK	1	Andre Blake (c)
CB	6	Di'Shon Bernard
CB	3	Michael Hector
CB	15	Joel Latibeaudiere
RWB	2	Dexter Lembikisa	(yellow card) 51'
LWB	22	Greg Leigh		(substituted off) 102'
RM	10	Bobby De Cordova-Reid		(substituted off) 90+2'
CM	14	Kasey Palmer	(yellow card) 53'	(substituted off) 74'
CM	17	Damion Lowe
LM	20	Renaldo Cephas		(substituted off) 73'
CF	19	Jamal Lowe	(yellow card) 69'	(substituted off) 65'
Substitutions:
MF	8	Daniel Johnson		(substituted on) 65'
FW	9	Cory Burke		(substituted on) 73' (substituted off) 102'
MF	16	Karoy Anderson		(substituted on) 74'
DF	4	Tayvon Gray		(substituted on) 90+2'
FW	18	Romario Williams		(substituted on) 102'
FW	7	Kaheim Dixon		(substituted on) 102'
Manager:
(Iceland) Heimir Hallgrímsson

Man of the Match:
Haji Wright (United States)

Assistant referees:
Gerson Orellana (Honduras)
Enmanuel Aguirre (Nicaragua)
Fourth official:
Keylor Herrera (Costa Rica)
Video assistant referee:
Ricardo Montero (Costa Rica)
Assistant video assistant referee:
Benjamin Whitty (Cayman Islands)

=== Panama vs Mexico ===
The two teams had played each other in 29 previous matches, including three times in the CONCACAF Nations League, all won by Mexico: 3–1 and 3–0 victories in the 2019–20 League A and a 1–0 win in the third place play-off of the 2022–23 Finals. Their most recent meeting was in the final of the 2023 CONCACAF Gold Cup, which was won 1–0 by Mexico.

March 21, 2024
22:15 (21:15 UTC−5)

Panama	0–3	Mexico
	Report	Álvarez 40'; Quiñones 43'; Pineda 67'

AT&T Stadium, Arlington
Attendance: 40,926
Referee: Walter López (Guatemala)

Panama	Mexico

GK	22	Orlando Mosquera
CB	4	Fidel Escobar
CB	3	José Córdoba		(substituted off) 79'
CB	16	Andrés Andrade
RWB	2	César Blackman		(substituted off) 79'
LWB	10	Yoel Bárcenas		(substituted off) 17'
RM	17	José Fajardo
CM	8	Adalberto Carrasquilla	(yellow card) 85'
CM	20	Aníbal Godoy (c)		(substituted off) 68'
LM	7	José Luis Rodríguez
CF	11	Ismael Díaz		(substituted off) 68'
Substitutions:
DF	15	Eric Davis		(substituted on) 17'
FW	18	Cecilio Waterman		(substituted on) 68'
MF	6	Cristian Martínez		(substituted on) 68'
DF	23	Iván Anderson		(substituted on) 79'
MF	21	Kahiser Lenis		(substituted on) 79'
Manager:
(Spain) Thomas Christiansen

GK	13	Guillermo Ochoa (c)
RB	2	Julián Araujo		(substituted off) 58'
CB	3	César Montes
CB	5	Johan Vásquez		(substituted off) 79'
LB	23	Jesús Gallardo
DM	4	Edson Álvarez		(substituted off) 77'
CM	18	Luis Chávez	(yellow card) 52'
CM	14	Érick Sánchez		(substituted off) 59'
RF	15	Uriel Antuna
CF	20	Henry Martín
LF	9	Julián Quiñones		(substituted off) 59'
Substitutions:
MF	21	Érick Aguirre		(substituted on) 58'
MF	17	Orbelín Pineda		(substituted on) 59'
FW	22	Hirving Lozano		(substituted on) 59'
MF	7	Luis Romo		(substituted on) 77'
DF	16	Jesús Orozco		(substituted on) 79'
Manager:
Jaime Lozano

Man of the Match:
Edson Álvarez (Mexico)

Assistant referees:
Keytzel Corrales (Nicaragua)
Raymundo Feliz (Dominican Republic)
Fourth official:
Julio Luna (Guatemala)
Video assistant referee:
Benjamín Pineda (Costa Rica)
Assistant video assistant referee:
Tristley Bassue (Saint Kitts and Nevis)

== Third place play-off ==
The two teams had met 18 times previously, but this was their first ever meeting in the CONCACAF Nations League. Panama led the all-time series with 9 wins to Jamaica's 3 wins and 6 draws. Their most recent meeting was Panama's 3–2 home victory in January 2022 during the 2022 FIFA World Cup qualification.

March 24, 2024
18:00 (17:00 UTC−5)

Panama	0–1	Jamaica
	Report	Lembikisa 42'

AT&T Stadium, Arlington
Referee: Tori Penso (United States)

Panama	Jamaica

GK	22	Orlando Mosquera
CB	13	Jiovany Ramos
CB	3	José Córdoba
CB	14	Roderick Miller	(substituted off) 68'
RM	23	Iván Anderson
CM	20	Aníbal Godoy (c)	(substituted off) 68'
CM	8	Adalberto Carrasquilla
LM	16	Andrés Andrade
AM	7	José Luis Rodríguez	(substituted off) 78'
CF	17	José Fajardo	(substituted off) 78'
CF	18	Cecilio Waterman	(substituted off) 86'
Substitutions:
MF	6	Cristian Martínez	(substituted on) 68'
MF	5	Abdiel Ayarza	(substituted on) 68'
FW	11	Ismael Díaz	(substituted on) 78'
MF	21	Kahiser Lenis	(substituted on) 78'
FW	9	Alfredo Stephens	(substituted on) 86'
Manager:
(Spain) Thomas Christiansen

GK	1	Andre Blake (c)
CB	6	Di'Shon Bernard
CB	3	Michael Hector
CB	15	Joel Latibeaudiere	(yellow card) 69'
RWB	2	Dexter Lembikisa	(yellow card) 90+6'
LWB	22	Greg Leigh		(substituted off) 90+1'
RM	10	Bobby De Cordova-Reid
CM	17	Damion Lowe
CM	14	Kasey Palmer	(yellow card) 44'	(substituted off) 81'
LM	12	Demarai Gray		(substituted off) 81'
CF	11	Shamar Nicholson		(substituted off) 89'
Substitutions:
MF	16	Karoy Anderson		(substituted on) 81'
MF	20	Renaldo Cephas		(substituted on) 81'
DF	5	Richard King		(substituted on) 89'
DF	4	Tayvon Gray		(substituted on) 90+1'
Manager:
(Iceland) Heimir Hallgrímsson

Man of the Match:
Dexter Lembikisa (Jamaica)

Assistant referees:
Brooke Mayo (United States)
Kathryn Nesbitt (United States)
Fourth official:
Saíd Martínez (Honduras)
Video assistant referee:
Edvin Jurisevic (United States)
Assistant video assistant referee:
Erick Miranda (Mexico)

== Final ==
24 March 2024
21:15 (20:15 UTC−5)

Mexico	0–2	United States
	Report	Adams 45'; Reyna 63'

AT&T Stadium, Arlington
Attendance: 59,471
Referee: Drew Fischer (Canada)

Mexico	United States

GK	13	Guillermo Ochoa (c)
RB	19	Jorge Sánchez
CB	3	César Montes
CB	5	Johan Vásquez	(yellow card) 55'
LB	23	Jesús Gallardo		(substituted off) 90+2'
DM	4	Edson Álvarez	(yellow card) 58'
CM	14	Érick Sánchez		(substituted off) 65'
CM	18	Luis Chávez		(substituted off) 80'
RF	15	Uriel Antuna	(yellow card) 63'	(substituted off) 65'
CF	20	Henry Martín
LF	22	Hirving Lozano
Substitutions:
MF	17	Orbelín Pineda		(substituted on) 65'
FW	11	Santiago Giménez	(yellow card) 74'	(substituted on) 65'
MF	7	Luis Romo		(substituted on) 80'
DF	6	Gerardo Arteaga		(substituted on) 90+2'
Manager:
Jaime Lozano

GK	1	Matt Turner
RB	2	Sergiño Dest
CB	3	Chris Richards
CB	13	Tim Ream
LB	5	Antonee Robinson
DM	4	Tyler Adams		(substituted off) 46'
CM	8	Weston McKennie	(yellow card) 27'
CM	7	Giovanni Reyna		(substituted off) 79'
RF	21	Timothy Weah		(substituted off) 90+2'
CF	14	Haji Wright		(substituted off) 66'
LF	10	Christian Pulisic (c)		(substituted off) 90+2'
Substitutions:
MF	15	Johnny Cardoso		(substituted on) 46'
FW	20	Folarin Balogun		(substituted on) 66'
MF	6	Yunus Musah		(substituted on) 79'
FW	17	Malik Tillman		(substituted on) 90+2'
FW	11	Brenden Aaronson		(substituted on) 90+2'
Manager:
Gregg Berhalter

Man of the Match:
Giovanni Reyna (United States)

Assistant referees:
Micheal Barwegen (Canada)
Lyes Arfa (Canada)
Fourth official:
Mario Escobar (Guatemala)
Video assistant referee:
Tatiana Guzmán (Nicaragua)
Assistant video assistant referee:
Daneon Parchment (Jamaica)

== Statistics ==
=== Goalscorers ===
There were 10 goals scored in 4 matches, for an average of 2.5 goals per match.

2 goals

- (United States) Haji Wright

1 goal

- (Jamaica) Greg Leigh
- (Jamaica) Dexter Lembikisa
- (Mexico) Edson Álvarez
- (Mexico) Orbelín Pineda
- (Mexico) Julián Quiñones
- (United States) Tyler Adams
- (United States) Giovanni Reyna

1 own goal

- (Jamaica) Cory Burke (against United States)

== Awards ==
CONCACAF announced the following squad as the best eleven of the Finals after the conclusion of the tournament.

Giovanni Reyna was named best player of the tournament, having recorded a total of two goals and two assists in the league and the finals play. Matt Turner was named best goalkeeper for a second consecutive edition.

Best XI

Goalkeeper	Defenders	Midfielders	Forwards
(United States) Matt Turner	(United States) Antonee Robinson (Jamaica) Michael Hector (Mexico) César Montes (Jamaica) Dexter Lembikisa	(Mexico) Edson Álvarez (United States) Tyler Adams (United States) Weston McKennie	(United States) Christian Pulisic (United States) Giovanni Reyna (United States) Haji Wright
