= Luis Malagón =

Mexican footballer (born 1997)

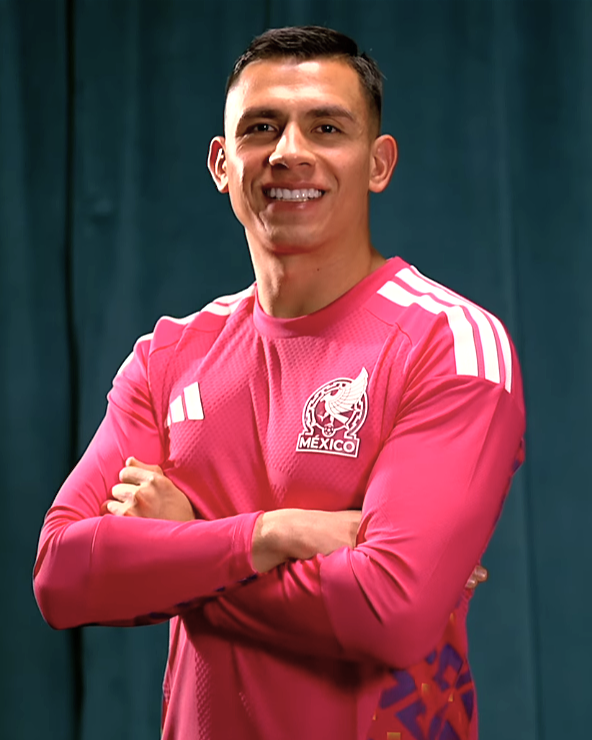
- Malagón with Mexico in 2025

Personal information
- Full name: Luis Ángel Malagón Velázquez
- Date of birth: 2 March 1997 (age 29)
- Place of birth: Zamora, Michoacán, Mexico
- Height: 1.80 m (5 ft 11 in)
- Position: Goalkeeper

Team information
- Current team: América
- Number: 1

Youth career
- 2012: Santos Laguna
- 2013: Real Zamora
- 2014–2020: Morelia

Senior career*
Years	Team	Apps	(Gls)
2016–2020	Morelia	10	(0)
2020–2022	Necaxa	72	(0)
2023–	América	127	(0)

International career^{‡}
2018	Mexico U21	5	(0)
2019–2021	Mexico U23	6	(0)
2023–	Mexico	19	(0)
Medal record
Men's football
Representing Mexico
CONCACAF Gold Cup
Winner	2025 United States–Canada
Winner	2023 United States–Canada
CONCACAF Nations League
Winner	2025 United States
Runner-up	2024 United States
Third place	2023 United States
Olympic Games
Bronze medal – third place	2020 Tokyo	Team
Olympic Qualifying Championship
Winner	2020 Mexico
Pan American Games
Bronze medal – third place	2019 Peru	Team
- * Club domestic league appearances and goals as of 21 November 2026 ‡ National team caps and goals as of 18 November 2025

Luis Ángel Malagón Velázquez (born 2 March 1997) is a Mexican professional footballer who plays as a goalkeeper for Liga MX club América and the Mexico national team.

== Club career ==
=== Youth ===
Born in Zamora, Michoacán, Malagón started his career in the Santos Laguna youth system, joining at the age of 12, and playing for their under-15 side sporadically through the 2012 calendar year. Malagón was then let go by the Torreón squad due to his lack of discipline, and joined his local club Real Zamora, making 33 league appearances in the Liga Premier de México. This would allow him to be spotted by scouts on Michoacán's top club Monarcas Morelia.

=== Morelia ===
After impressing in the Mexican lower divisions, Malagón was spotted by Monarcas, and joined their academy for the 2014–15 season. He went on to make 48 appearances across several of Monarcas' youth squads across the 2014–15 and 2015–16 seasons, until being promoted to the first team. In the 2015–16 season, Malagón was third in the pecking order, behind Cirilo Saucedo and Carlos Felipe Rodríguez who split time in the league. Despite this, Malagón was given a chance to play in the cup competition, where he made his first team debut on 16 February 2016 against Necaxa in which he conceded the winning goal in the 88th minute, losing 1–0.

Despite making his professional debut, Malagón was still primarily playing for the reserved, making appearances for Monarcas under-20 squad and their third-tier team, with Rodríguez and Sebastián Sosa sharing goalkeeper duties on the first team. Malagón would again be given the chance to play for the first team on the 2018–19 season, when he was given the opportunity to start on another cup match.

During that season he firmly cemented himself as Monarcas' backup goalkeeper, making appearances on the cup and was given the chance to make his league debut on 5 April 2019, against Puebla, after Sosa went down with an injury. He had 3 saves and the match ended in a 1–1 tie. After that season he proceeded to split time with Sosa, until cementing himself as a starter for the latter half of the 2019–20 campaign which was cut short due to the COVID-19 pandemic.

=== Necaxa ===
In June 2020 Malagón completed a move to Club Necaxa, after Hugo González's contract with the club ended, leaving on a free transfer to C.F. Monterrey. He made his debut on July 24, 2020, suffering a loss in the league against Tigres UANL. He quickly cemented himself as the starter across the 2020–21 campaign, with the only games he didn't play coming due to international duty, and an injury he suffered whilst playing for the national team.

Malagón remained Necaxa's starter throughout the 2021–22 season, being praised for his performances despite Necaxa's poor performance in the first half of the season. This included an impressive performance on October 4, against Tigres, in which Malagón made 8 saves, reaching the mark of 100 saves with the club.

In the latter half of the season, Necaxa's performances improved, and with Malagón still at a high level, they finished in the 9th position in the league, earning a spot in the repechaje stage of the playoffs. They faced Cruz Azul, but were knocked out on penalties after a 1–1 draw in regular play. Throughout the 2021–22 campaign Malagón played 27 matches, keeping 8 clean sheets in the process.

In the summer of 2022, Hugo González was brought back to Necaxa, fueling speculation about Malagóns future with the club, but Malagón stayed with the Aguascalientes side, welcoming the competition for the number one spot within the organization.

=== America ===
==== Clausura 2023 ====
In December 2022, as former number one, Guillermo Ochoa departed to Italian club Salernitana, Malagón completed a transfer to Club América. It was confirmed that Malagón would wear the #33 shirt for the remainder of the campaign. He would make his unofficial debut later that month.

Though initially serving as a backup for Óscar Jiménez, Jiménez's poor performances and a string of yellow cards for time-wasting early in 2023 saw Malagón given the chance to start against Tigres on March 11, making his official debut for the club, keeping a clean sheet en route to a 2–0 win. Malagón would keep starting throughout the remainder of the season, cementing himself as América's starting goalkeeper, with an impressive penalty save in the dying minutes of an April 8 match against Monterrey, sealing a 2–1 victory for América. América would be knocked out on the Clausura 2023 semifinals by rivals Guadalajara.

==== 2023–24: First League Title ====
After spending his first season with the designated squad number 33, it was announced that Malagón would wear the number 1 shirt for the 2023–24 season. Malagón did not play in the first two matches of the season, as he was coming back from international duty for Mexico in the 2023 Gold Cup, with Óscar Jiménez taking his place. He would come back to the starting lineup on matchday 3, a 1–1 draw against Atlas. He would be the starting goalkeeper for the remainder of the season, only losing his place to Jiménez on matchday 16, after being rested against Club Tijuana. Malagón was also in goal for América's four Leagues Cup matches, as they finished second in the group and were knocked out by Nashville on penalties, with Malagón's winning save getting called back as VAR determined he stepped over the goal line. Malagón would also be in goal for all of América's six matches in the liguilla, including both legs of the Apertura 2023 final, where América beat Tigres 4–1 on aggregate, to lift their 14th league title, and Malagón's first in his career. Malagón kept a clean sheet in the second leg, making three saves, including a key header from André Pierre Gignac.

On 25 September, the Campeones Cup was played against MLS Cup 2023 winners Columbus Crew. Following a 1–1 draw, the match went into a penalty kick shootout where Malagón contributed two saves as América won the series 5–4. Malagón's performances led him to be nominated by the IFFHS for best goalkeeper of the year, the only nominee among 20 to not play in a European league.

==== 2025–present ====
On 10 March 2026, Malagón sustained a ruptured Achilles tendon during a 1–0 away win against Philadelphia Union in the CONCACAF Champions Cup, requiring surgery and an extended recovery period, effectively ruling him out from World Cup 2026 hosted on home soil.

== International career ==
=== Youth ===
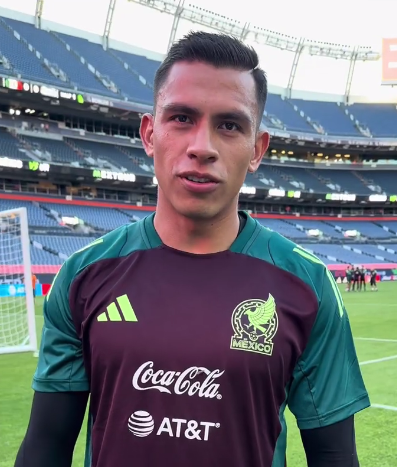
Malagón with Mexico in 2024

Malagón was called up by Jaime Lozano to participate with the under-23 team at the 2019 Pan American Games, with Mexico winning the third-place match. He also participated at the 2020 CONCACAF Olympic Qualifying Championship. In the final group stage match against the United States, Malagón suffered an elbow injury, causing him to miss the rest of the tournament. Mexico went on to win the competition. He was subsequently called up to participate in the 2020 Summer Olympics. Malagón won the bronze medal with the Olympic team.

=== Senior ===
In December 2021, Malagón received his first call-up to the senior national team by Gerardo Martino, and made his debut nearly two years later under Diego Cocca on 7 June 2023, in a friendly match against Guatemala.

In the 2023 Nations League quarter-finals, Malagón played in both legs against Honduras, helping Mexico qualify for the 2024 Copa América and the Nations League finals. He kept a clean sheet in the second leg and saved a penalty in the shoot-out to be victorious 4–2. In the 2024 Nations League quarter-finals, Malagón started in the second leg match against Honduras at the Estadio Nemesio Díez in Toluca. After Mexico initially fell 2–0 to Honduras in San Pedro Sula, he kept a clean sheet as Mexico won 4–0, securing a 4–2 aggregate victory and qualifying for the 2025 CONCACAF Gold Cup and the Nations League finals.

On 20 March 2025, in the semi-final match against Canada, Malagón recorded another clean sheet in Mexico's 2–0 win, making a crucial save against captain Alphonso Davies to qualify for the final. In the final, Malagón started as Mexico defeated Panama 2–1 at SoFi Stadium in Inglewood to win the country's first-ever Nations League title. He went on to win the Golden Glove as the tournament's best goalkeeper for making 4 saves and keeping a clean sheet in the final tournament.

== Career statistics ==
=== Club ===
As of match played on 21 November 2026

Appearances and goals by club, season and competition
Club	Season	League			National cup		Continental		Other		Total	
Club	Season	Division	Apps	Goals	Apps	Goals	Apps	Goals	Apps	Goals	Apps	Goals
Morelia	2015–16	Liga MX	—		3	0	—		—		3	0
Morelia	2018–19	Liga MX	5	0	7	0	—		—		12	0
Morelia	2019–20	Liga MX	5	0	4	0	—		—		9	0
Morelia	Total		10	0	14	0	—		—		24	0
Necaxa	2020–21	Liga MX	26	0	—		—		—		26	0
Necaxa	2021–22	Liga MX	28	0	—		—		—		28	0
Necaxa	2022–23	Liga MX	18	0	2 (Note: Appearances in Copa Sky por México)	0	—		—		20	0
Necaxa	Total		72	0	2	0	—		—		74	0
América	2022–23	Liga MX	11	0	1	0	—		—		12	0
América	2023–24	Liga MX	41	0	—		8 (Note: Appearances in CONCACAF Champions Cup)	0	4 (Note: Appearances in Leagues Cup)	0	53	0
América	2024–25	Liga MX	42	0	—		4	0	5 (Note: Three appearances in Leagues Cup, one appearance in Campeones Cup, one appearance in FIFA Club World Cup play-in)	0	51	0
América	2025–26	Liga MX	26	0	1 (Note: Appearance in Campeón de Campeones)	0	3	0	2	0	32	0
América	2026–27	Liga MX	7	0	—		—		—		7	0
América	Total		127	0	2	0	15	0	11	0	155	0
Career total			209	0	18	0	15	0	11	0	253	0

=== International ===
As of match played on 18 November 2025

Appearances and goals by national team and year
National team	Year	Apps	Goals
Mexico	2023	4	0
Mexico	2024	3	0
Mexico	2025	12	0
Total		19	0

== Honours ==
América

- Liga MX: Apertura 2023, Clausura 2024, Apertura 2024
- Campeón de Campeones: 2024
- Supercopa de la Liga MX : 2024
- Campeones Cup: 2024

Mexico U23

- Pan American Bronze Medal: 2019
- CONCACAF Olympic Qualifying Championship: 2020
- Olympic Bronze Medal: 2020

Mexico

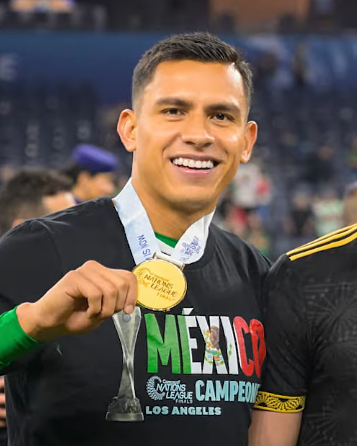
Malagón, following Mexico's victory in the 2025 CONCACAF Nations League Finals

- CONCACAF Gold Cup: 2023, 2025
- CONCACAF Nations League: 2024–25

Individual

- Liga MX All-Star: 2024, 2025
- Liga MX Golden Glove: 2023–24
- Liga MX Most Valuable Player: Clausura 2024, Apertura 2024
- Liga MX Best XI: Clausura 2024, Apertura 2024, Clausura 2025
- Liga MX Save of the Month: December 2024, January 2025, February 2025, March 2025, August 2025
- IFFHS CONCACAF Best XI: 2024, 2025
- The Best of America Best Liga MX Player: 2024
- CONCACAF Nations League Golden Glove: 2024–25
- CONCACAF Nations League Finals Best XI: 2025
- CONCACAF Gold Cup Golden Glove: 2025
- CONCACAF Gold Cup Best XI: 2025
