= 2023 Nations League Finals =

The 2023 Nations League Finals may refer to two international association football tournaments.

- 2023 CONCACAF Nations League Finals
- 2023 UEFA Nations League Finals
