= Roberto Alvarado =

Mexican footballer (born 1998)

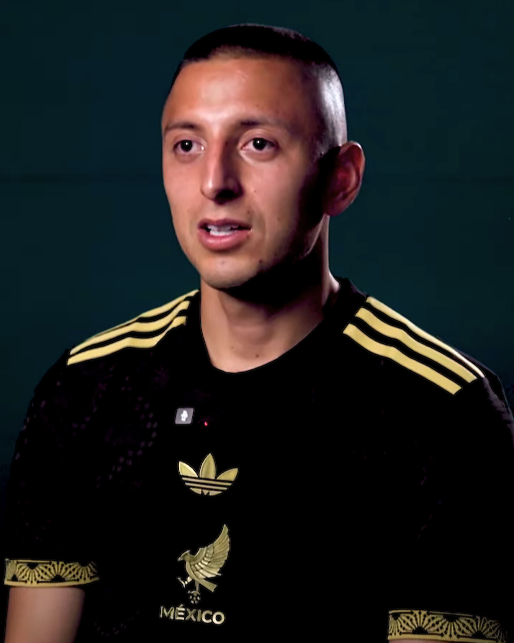
- Alvarado with Mexico in 2025

Personal information
- Full name: Roberto Carlos Alvarado Hernández
- Date of birth: 7 September 1998 (age 28)
- Place of birth: Salamanca, Guanajuato, Mexico
- Height: 1.76 m (5 ft 9 in)
- Position: Winger

Team information
- Current team: Guadalajara
- Number: 25

Youth career
- –2013: Xidoo
- 2013–2015: Celaya

Senior career*
Years	Team	Apps	(Gls)
2013–2016	Celaya	50	(8)
2017	Pachuca	9	(1)
2017–2018	Necaxa	26	(2)
2018–2021	Cruz Azul	120	(16)
2022–	Guadalajara	171	(36)

International career^{‡}
2018	Mexico U21	5	(3)
2021	Mexico U23	9	(1)
2018–	Mexico	78	(5)
Medal record
Men's football
Representing Mexico
CONCACAF Gold Cup
Winner	2025 United States–Canada	Team
Winner	2023 United States–Canada	Team
Winner	2019 United States	Team
CONCACAF Nations League
Winner	2025 United States
Runner-up	2024 United States
Olympic Games
Bronze medal – third place	2020 Tokyo	Team
Olympic Qualifying Championship
Winner	2020 Mexico
Toulon Tournament
Runner-up	2018 France	Team
- * Club domestic league appearances and goals as of 8 November 2026 ‡ National team caps and goals as of 17 November 2026

Roberto Carlos Alvarado Hernández (Spanish pronunciation: [ɾɾoβˈeɾto kˈaɾlos ˌalβaɾˈaðo eɾnˈandeθ]; born 7 September 1998), nicknamed "Piojo" (lit. 'Louse'), is a Mexican professional footballer who plays as a winger for Liga MX club Guadalajara and the Mexico national team.

Alvarado made his professional debut with second-tier side Celaya at the age of 15, becoming the youngest player in league history. After a short spell with Pachuca, he moved to Necaxa in 2017. The following year, Alvarado joined Cruz Azul, where he won a Liga MX title, putting an end to a 24-year drought for the club. He joined Guadalajara in December 2021.

Alvarado participated with the Mexico under-21 team that received second place at the 2018 Toulon Tournament and the Mexico under-23 team that won a bronze medal at the 2020 Olympic tournament. He earned his first senior international cap for Mexico on 7 September 2018 in a friendly match against Uruguay. Alvarado helped the team win three CONCACAF Gold Cup titles in 2019, 2023, and 2025. He also won the 2025 edition of the CONCACAF Nations League, and finished as runner-up in 2024. He also played in two editions of the FIFA World Cup in 2022 and 2026.

== Early life ==
Alvarado was born on 7 September 1998, in Salamanca, Guanajuato, Mexico, to Guillermo Alvarado and Julia Hernández.

== Club career ==
=== Celaya ===
Alvarado was brought by his father to tryout for Celaya, immediately earning a spot on the club's reserve side in Tercera División.

==== 2013–14: Debut season ====
Alvarado made his professional debut for Celaya on 25 September 2013 in the Apertura Copa MX group stage match against Estudiantes Tecos, coming on as a substitute for Guillermo Clemens on the 59th minute in a 1–0 win. He made his league debut three days later, also against Estudiantes Tecos, in a 0–0 draw, coming on as a substitute for René García on the 86th minute. Alvarado was 15 years, 21 days of age, becoming the youngest player ever to play in Ascenso MX.

Alvarado scored his first professional goal in the 27th minute of a 1–0 win in a Clausura Copa MX group stage match against Atlas on 18 February 2014.

==== 2014–15: Trials in England ====
Alvarado had unsuccessful trials with English clubs Manchester United and Sunderland in November 2014, and Leicester City in January 2015. His father later said in 2021 that FIFA regulations did not allow his transfer to England due to him still being 14 years old at the time.

==== 2016–17: Breakthrough, final season, and departure ====
It was not until the Apertura 2016 season that Alvarado truly broke out, scoring six goals in 14 games, and catching the attention of Mexican top-flight teams.

=== Pachuca ===
On 13 December 2016, Pachuca acquired Alvarado from Celaya with a two-year contract. He scored his first goal with the team on 3 March 2017 while trailing from behind 1–0 in a 3–2 victory over Tijuana. Although he only played 9 league games in his lone season with Pachuca, he did make two appearances during their CONCACAF Champions League-winning campaign in 2016–17.

=== Necaxa ===
Alvarado was acquired by Necaxa in a deal that involved trading away Edson Puch to Pachuca for the Apertura 2017. On 26 August 2017, he scored his first goal with Necaxa, granting the team a 2–1 win over Atlas. On 14 April 2018, he scored the only goal in a 1–0 victory over Lobos BUAP. He became a starter during the Clausura 2018 season. In April, he helped Nexaxa win the Clausura Copa MX against Toluca.

=== Cruz Azul ===
==== 2018–19: Debut season and top performances ====
On 21 May 2018, Alvarado joined Cruz Azul. On 21 July, he debuted in a 3–0 league victory against Puebla, playing 84 minutes, eventually being substituted out for Misael Domínguez.

On 4 August, Alvarado scored his first goal for Cruz Azul in a 1–0 victory against Tigres UANL. Two weeks later, on 18 August, Alvarado notched three assists in a 3–0 victory against León, causing ESPN to run a story calling Alvarado "a leading light for Cruz Azul" despite his young age. By now he had become a sensation, with the Spanish publication Marca calling the teenager a "Heaven-sent jewel" later that week. Midway through the tournament, Alvarado was considered by the press to be one of the best midfielders in the league.

In November, he helped Cruz Azul win the Apertura Copa MX against Monterrey, his second in a row. On 7 November 2021, Alvarado scored his first hat-trick in a 4–3 away loss against Pumas.

=== Guadalajara ===
On 26 December 2021, Alvarado joined Guadalajara in an exchange that saw Uriel Antuna and Alejandro Mayorga join Cruz Azul. Alvarado made his debut with Guadalajara on 16 January 2022, in a 2–1 loss against Pachuca. On 12 February, he scored his first goal with Chivas against Tigres in a 1–3 defeat.

On 24 April 2024, Alvarado scored the only goal in an away victory against city rivals Atlas, helping them achieve a top six finish on the table, directly qualifying them to the Clausura championship quarter-finals. His performances for April led him to be named Player of the Month.

On 22 August 2025, Alvarado scored the match-tying goal against Tijuana in a 3–3 away draw after trailing behind from three goals.

On 25 July 2026, Alvarado scored the final-minute goal against Juárez to give his team a 1–0 home win. The following match week, he scored the match-tying goal against Puebla for a 1–1 draw. On 24 October, he scored the only goal of the match against Monterrey.

== International career ==
=== Youth ===
==== 2018: Toulon Tournament ====
Alvarado was part of Marco Antonio Ruiz's roster that participated at the 2018 Toulon Tournament, where he was the second highest scorer in the tournament with 3 goals, scoring once in the group stage matches against Qatar and China and in the final against England where Mexico lost 2–1. He was called up yet again ahead of the 2018 Central American and Caribbean Games; however, Cruz Azul refused to release him for the tournament.

==== 2021: Olympic Qualifying Championship and Summer Olympics ====
Called up by Jaime Lozano, Alvarado participated at the 2020 CONCACAF Olympic Qualifying Championship, appearing in all five matches, where Mexico won the competition. He was subsequently called up again by Lozano to participate in the 2020 Summer Olympics. Alvarado won the bronze medal with the Olympic team after defeating Japan in the third-place match.

=== Senior ===
==== 2018–19: Beginnings and first CONCACAF Gold Cup ====
On 29 August 2018, interim manager Ricardo Ferretti called up Alvarado for the first time to the senior national team for a pair of friendly matches against Uruguay and the United States. He made his debut on 7 September, coming on as a second-half substitute for Alan Pulido in a 4–1 loss to Uruguay in Houston, Texas.

In May 2019, Alvarado was included in Tata Martino's preliminary roster for the 2019 CONCACAF Gold Cup. On 5 June 2019, he scored his first international goal in a 3–1 friendly victory against Venezuela at the Mercedes-Benz Stadium in Atlanta. The following day, Alvarado was included in the final squad for 2019 CONCACAF Gold Cup. He netted the opening goal in Mexico's 3–1 group stage win against Canada, scoring off of a rebound after a Raúl Jiménez shot was saved by Milan Borjan. Alvarado went on to appear in all matches of the tournament, helping Mexico win the final against rivals the United States.

==== 2022: First FIFA World Cup ====
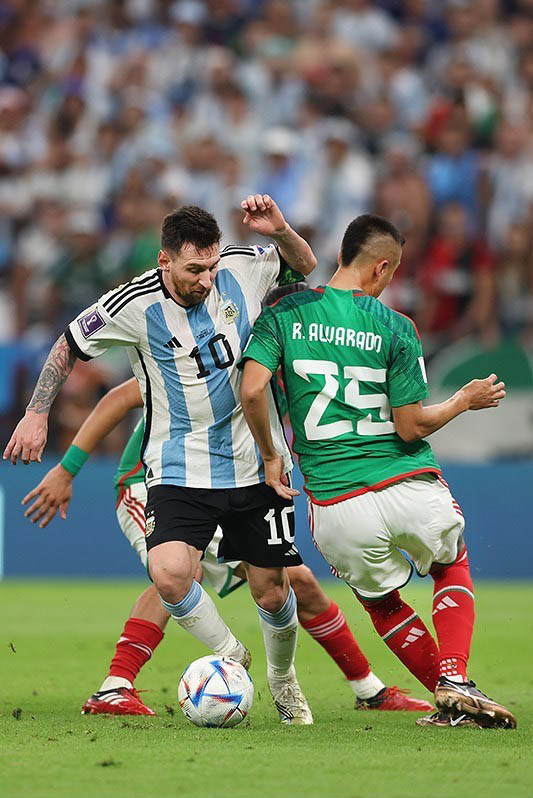
Alvarado (number 25) with Mexico at the 2022 FIFA World Cup

In October 2022, Alvarado was named in Mexico's preliminary 31-man squad for the 2022 FIFA World Cup, and in November, he was ultimately included in the final 26-man roster. He made his only appearance coming on as a substitute in Mexico's 2–0 loss against eventual FIFA World Cup winners Argentina.

In June 2023, Alvarado was called up by Jaime Lozano to replace the injured Alexis Vega for the Gold Cup, winning the competition.

In March 2024, Alvarado was called up to participate in the CONCACAF Nations League Finals, finishing runner-up to the United States.

Alvarado was called up by Javier Aguirre for the 2025 CONCACAF Nations League Finals, helping Mexico win their first CONCACAF Nations League after defeating Panama 2–1 in the final. He was included in the subsequent Gold Cup, winning the tournament as well.

==== 2026: Second FIFA World Cup ====
Alvarado was named in the 26-man squad for the 2026 FIFA World Cup, hosted on home soil. Appearing as a starter in all of the matches Mexico played, Alvarado contributed four assists, the most for a Mexican player in a single edition of the FIFA World Cup.

== Style of play ==
Nicknamed El Piojo (The Louse) after his idol Claudio López, Alvarado is a left-footed player that mainly plays on the right wing. A versatile attacking player, he can also play on the left wing and is also capable of playing as an attacking midfielder or second striker. Technically proficient with both feet, playing on the right allows him the opportunity to cut or drift inside onto his favoured left.

He has shown an ability to finish from in and around the box, but comparing his shots on target to shots off target suggests that shooting isn't his strongest attribute. Instead, his style of play focuses on creating opportunities. The change of pace is Alvarado's favoured technique, and he excels when there's space behind an opponent to race into, but he can also deceive defenders with close control. He is proficient at pulling away from defenders to make himself available for a pass and has the ability to accurately place floated crosses and through balls.

Under Javier Aguirre's tenure as Mexico's manager, particularly during the 2026 FIFA World Cup, Alvarado was dubbed as a "tactical Swiss Army knife" due to his versatility on the pitch, work rate, and taking on defensive wing-back/full-back responsibilities.

Early on in his career, he was compared to fellow national teammate Diego Lainez, although Alvarado has stated they both have differing playing styles. His manager at Cruz Azul, Pedro Caixinha, has compared Alvarado to João Moutinho. Alvarado has also cited Ángel Di María as an idol.

== Personal life ==
Alvarado is named after the Brazilian footballer and the Brazilian singer of the same name.

Alvarado married his wife, Dayana Gómez, on 24 May 2019, after almost three years of dating. They had a daughter named Emily in 2022 after having lost a baby the previous year.

== Career statistics ==
=== Club ===
As of match played on 8 November 2026

Appearances and goals by club, season and competition
Club	Season	League			National Cup		Continental		Other		Total	
Club	Season	Division	Apps	Goals	Apps	Goals	Apps	Goals	Apps	Goals	Apps	Goals
Celaya	2013–14	Ascenso MX	5	0	4	1	—		—		9	1
Celaya	2014–15	Ascenso MX	3	0	2	0	—		—		5	0
Celaya	2015–16	Ascenso MX	24	1	6	0	—		—		30	1
Celaya	2016–17	Ascenso MX	18	7	1	1	—		—		19	8
Celaya	Total		50	8	13	2	—		—		63	10
Pachuca	2016–17	Liga MX	9	1	—		2 (Note: Appearances in CONCACAF Champions League/Cup)	0	—		11	1
Necaxa	2017–18	Liga MX	26	2	11	0	—		—		37	2
Cruz Azul	2018–19	Liga MX	42	4	12	2	—		—		54	6
Cruz Azul	2019–20	Liga MX	27	4	1 (Note: Appearance in Supercopa MX)	0	2	0	3 (Note: Appearances in Leagues Cup)	1	33	5
Cruz Azul	2020–21	Liga MX	36	4	1 (Note: Appearance in Copa GNP por México)	0	5	0	—		42	4
Cruz Azul	2021–22	Liga MX	15	4	—		—		1 (Note: Appearance in Campeones Cup)	0	16	4
Cruz Azul	Total		120	16	14	2	7	0	4	1	145	19
Guadalajara	2021–22	Liga MX	19	3	—		—		—		19	3
Guadalajara	2022–23	Liga MX	39	4	—		—		—		39	4
Guadalajara	2023–24	Liga MX	36	11	—		2	1	2	0	40	12
Guadalajara	2024–25	Liga MX	31	9	—		3	0	2	1	36	10
Guadalajara	2025–26	Liga MX	31	4	—		—		2	0	33	4
Guadalajara	2026–27	Liga MX	15	5	—		—		3	1	18	6
Guadalajara	Total		171	36	—		5	1	9	2	185	39
Career total			376	63	38	4	14	1	13	3	441	71

=== International ===
As of match played on 17 November 2026

Appearances and goals by national team and year
National team	Year	Apps	Goals
Mexico	2018	5	0
Mexico	2019	12 (Note: Alvarado additionally played a match against Martinique in 2019, which is not recognized by FIFA.)	3
Mexico	2020	2	0
Mexico	2021	6	1
Mexico	2022	7	0
Mexico	2023	11	1
Mexico	2024	5	0
Mexico	2025	13	0
Mexico	2026	17	0
Total		78	5

Scores and results list Mexico's goal tally first.

List of international goals scored by Roberto Alvarado
No.	Date	Venue	Opponent	Score	Result	Competition
1.	5 June 2019	Mercedes-Benz Stadium, Atlanta, United States	Venezuela	1–1	3–1	Friendly
2.	19 June 2019	Broncos Stadium at Mile High, Denver, United States	Canada	1–0	3–1	2019 CONCACAF Gold Cup
3.	15 October 2019	Estadio Azteca, Mexico City, Mexico	Panama	1–0	3–1	2019–20 CONCACAF Nations League A
4.	27 October 2021	Bank of America Stadium, Charlotte, United States	Ecuador	1–1	2–3	Friendly
5.	12 July 2023	Allegiant Stadium, Paradise, United States	Jamaica	3–0	3–0	2023 CONCACAF Gold Cup

== Honours ==
Pachuca

- CONCACAF Champions League: 2016–17

Necaxa

- Copa MX: Clausura 2018

Cruz Azul

- Liga MX: Guardianes 2021
- Copa MX: Apertura 2018
- Supercopa MX: 2019
- Leagues Cup: 2019

Mexico U23

- CONCACAF Olympic Qualifying Championship: 2020
- Olympic Bronze Medal: 2020

Mexico

- CONCACAF Gold Cup: 2019, 2023, 2025
- CONCACAF Nations League: 2024–25

Individual

- Liga MX Player of the Month: April 2024
- Liga MX All-Star: 2024, 2025
- Liga MX Goal of the Month: January 2026
