= CONCACAF Gold Cup awards =

Association football tournament awards

At the end of each CONCACAF Gold Cup final tournament, several awards are presented to the players and teams which have distinguished themselves in various aspects of the game.

== Awards ==
- There are currently five post-tournament awards from the Tournament Awards Committee:
  - the Golden Ball for best player, first awarded in 1991;
  - the Golden Boot for top goalscorer, first awarded in 1991;
  - the Golden Glove for best goalkeeper, first awarded in 2002;
  - the Fair Play Trophy for the team with the best record of fair play, first awarded in 2002;
  - the Goal of the Tournament, for the best goal scored during the tournament, first awarded in 2021.

== Best player ==
Gold Cup	Golden Ball
1991	(United States) Tony Meola
1993	(Mexico) Ramón Ramírez
1996	(Mexico) Raúl Lara
1998	(United States) Kasey Keller
2000	(Canada) Craig Forrest
2002	(United States) Brian McBride
2003	(Mexico) Jesús Arellano
2005	(Panama) Luis Tejada
2007	(Canada) Julian de Guzman
2009	(Mexico) Giovani dos Santos
2011	(Mexico) Javier Hernández
2013	(United States) Landon Donovan
2015	(Mexico) Andrés Guardado
2017	(United States) Michael Bradley
2019	(Mexico) Raúl Jiménez
2021	(Mexico) Héctor Herrera
2023	(Panama) Adalberto Carrasquilla
2025	(Mexico) Edson Álvarez

== Top goalscorer ==
Gold Cup	Golden Boot	Goals
1991	(Mexico) Benjamín Galindo	4
1993	(Mexico) Zague	11
1996	(United States) Eric Wynalda	4
1998	(Mexico) Luis Hernández	4
2000	(Canada) Carlo Corazzin	4
2002	(United States) Brian McBride	4
2003	(Costa Rica) Walter Centeno (United States) Landon Donovan	4
2005	(United States) DaMarcus Beasley	3
2007	(Honduras) Carlos Pavón	5
2009	(Mexico) Miguel Sabah	4
2011	(Mexico) Javier Hernández	7
2013	(Panama) Gabriel Torres (United States) Landon Donovan (United States) Chris Wondolowski	5
2015	(United States) Clint Dempsey	7
2017	(Canada) Alphonso Davies	3
2019	(Canada) Jonathan David	6
2021	(Qatar) Almoez Ali	4
2023	(United States) Jesús Ferreira	7
2025	(Panama) Ismael Díaz	6

== Best goalkeeper ==
Gold Cup	Golden Glove	Clean sheets
2002	(Canada) Lars Hirschfeld	2
2003	(Mexico) Oswaldo Sánchez	5
2005	(Panama) Jaime Penedo	2
2007	(Guadeloupe) Franck Grandel	0
2009	(Costa Rica) Keylor Navas	1
2011	(Honduras) Noel Valladares	1
2013	(Panama) Jaime Penedo	2
2015	(United States) Brad Guzan	2
2017	(Jamaica) Andre Blake	3
2019	(Mexico) Guillermo Ochoa	3
2021	(United States) Matt Turner	5
2023	(Mexico) Guillermo Ochoa	4
2025	(Mexico) Luis Malagón	3

== Best young player ==
The Young Player Award ("Bright Future Award" 2015) was awarded for the first time at the 2015 Gold Cup in Canada–United States and given to Mexico's Jesús Corona.

The winner of the award has only been part of the winning country one time: Jesús Corona in 2015.

Gold Cup	Young Player	Age
2015	(Mexico) Jesús Corona	22
2017	(Canada) Alphonso Davies	16
2019	(United States) Christian Pulisic	20
2021	(Canada) Tajon Buchanan	22
2025	(Guatemala) Olger Escobar	18

== Team of the Tournament ==
Year	Host(s)	Goalkeeper	Defenders	Midfielders	Forwards	Ref.
1998	United States	(United States) Kasey Keller	(United States) Eddie Pope (Mexico) Claudio Suárez (Brazil) Zé Maria	(Mexico) Ramón Ramírez (United States) Preki (Jamaica) Paul Hall (Mexico) Cuauhtémoc Blanco	(Brazil) Edmundo (Brazil) Romário (Costa Rica) Paulo Wanchope	
2000	United States	(Canada) Craig Forrest	(Mexico) Rafael Márquez (Canada) Jason de Vos	(Mexico) Ramón Ramírez (Peru) Roberto Palacios (Trinidad and Tobago) Russell Latapy	(United States) Cobi Jones (Trinidad and Tobago) Arnold Dwarika (Canada) Carlo Corazzin (Honduras) Carlos Pavón (Trinidad and Tobago) Dwight Yorke	
2002	United States	(Cuba) Odelin Molina	(Costa Rica) Luis Marin (United States) Jeff Agoos (Canada) Jason de Vos	(Mexico) Alfonso Sosa (Costa Rica) Mauricio Solis (United States) Landon Donovan (South Korea) Kim Nam-il (Costa Rica) Rónald Gómez	(Canada) Kevin McKenna (United States) Brian McBride	
2003	United States; Mexico					
2005	United States	(Panama) Jaime Penedo	(Panama) Felipe Baloy (Honduras) Samuel Caballero (United States) Oguchi Onyewu	(United States) DaMarcus Beasley (United States) Landon Donovan (Colombia) Jairo Patiño (Mexico) Luis Ernesto Pérez	(Colombia) Tressor Moreno (Panama) Luis Tejada (Honduras) Wilmer Velásquez	
2007	United States	(Guadeloupe) Franck Grandel	(Panama) Felipe Baloy (Canada) Richard Hastings (United States) Frankie Hejduk (Mexico) Carlos Salcido	(Costa Rica) Walter Centeno (Canada) Julian de Guzman (United States) Pablo Mastroeni (Mexico) Pável Pardo	(Honduras) Carlos Pavón (Panama) Blas Pérez	
2009	United States	(Costa Rica) Keylor Navas (Mexico) Guillermo Ochoa	(Canada) Mike Klukowski (Costa Rica) Freddy Fernández (Mexico) Fausto Pinto (Panama) Luis Moreno (United States) Clarence Goodson (United States) Chad Marshall	(Canada) Julian de Guzman (Costa Rica) Celso Borges (Guadeloupe) Stéphane Auvray (Mexico) Gerardo Torrado (Mexico) Giovani dos Santos (United States) Stuart Holden	(Costa Rica) Álvaro Saborío (Honduras) Walter Martínez (Mexico) Miguel Sabah (United States) Kenny Cooper	
2011	United States					
2013	United States					
2015	United States Canada					
2017	United States	(Jamaica) Andre Blake	(United States) Graham Zusi (United States) Omar Gonzalez (Jamaica) Jermaine Taylor (Jamaica) Kemar Lawrence	(United States) Darlington Nagbe (Mexico) Jesús Dueñas (United States) Michael Bradley (Canada) Alphonso Davies	(United States) Jozy Altidore (United States) Jordan Morris	
2019	United States; Costa Rica; Jamaica	(Mexico) Guillermo Ochoa	(Mexico) Luis Rodríguez (Mexico) Carlos Salcedo (United States) Aaron Long (Mexico) Jesús Gallardo	(United States) Michael Bradley (Mexico) Andrés Guardado (Mexico) Jonathan dos Santos (Canada) Jonathan David (United States) Christian Pulisic	(Mexico) Raúl Jiménez	
2021	United States	(United States) Matt Turner	(United States) Miles Robinson (Mexico) Edson Álvarez (United States) Shaq Moore (Jamaica) Damion Lowe	(Mexico) Héctor Herrera (Costa Rica) Celso Borges (Canada) Tajon Buchanan	(Qatar) Akram Afif (Mexico) Rogelio Funes Mori (Qatar) Almoez Ali	
2023	United States; Canada	(Mexico) Guillermo Ochoa	(Panama) Fidel Escobar (Mexico) Johan Vásquez (Mexico) Jorge Sánchez	(Mexico) Luis Chávez (Panama) Adalberto Carrasquilla (Mexico) Orbelín Pineda (Panama) Yoel Bárcenas (Jamaica) Demarai Gray	(United States) Jesús Ferreira (Panama) Ismael Díaz	
2025	United States; Canada	(Mexico) Luis Malagón	(Mexico) Johan Vásquez (Mexico) César Montes (United States) Chris Richards	(United States) Diego Luna (United States) Malik Tillman (Mexico) Edson Álvarez (Guatemala) Oscar Santis (Dominican Republic) Peter González	(Mexico) Raúl Jiménez (Panama) Ismael Díaz	

== Fair Play Trophy ==
Gold Cup	Fair Play Trophy Winners
2002	Costa Rica
2003	United States
2005	Honduras
2007	Honduras
2009	United States
2011	Mexico
2013	Panama
2015	Jamaica
2017	United States
2019	United States
2021	United States
2023	United States
2025	United States

== Goal of the Tournament ==
The Goal of the Tournament award was awarded for the first time at the 2021 CONCACAF Gold Cup.

- Scores and results list the goal tally of the players' team first.

Gold Cup	Player	Scored against	Score	Minute	Result	Round	Ref.
2021	(Jamaica) Bobby De Cordova-Reid	Suriname	2–0	26'	2–0	Group stage	
2023	(Guadeloupe) Anthony Baron	Cuba	4–0	50'	4–0	Group stage	

== See also ==
- FIFA World Cup awards
- UEFA European Championship awards
- Copa América awards
- Africa Cup of Nations awards
- AFC Asian Cup awards
- OFC Men's Nations Cup awards
