= Adalberto Carrasquilla =

Panamanian footballer (born 1998)

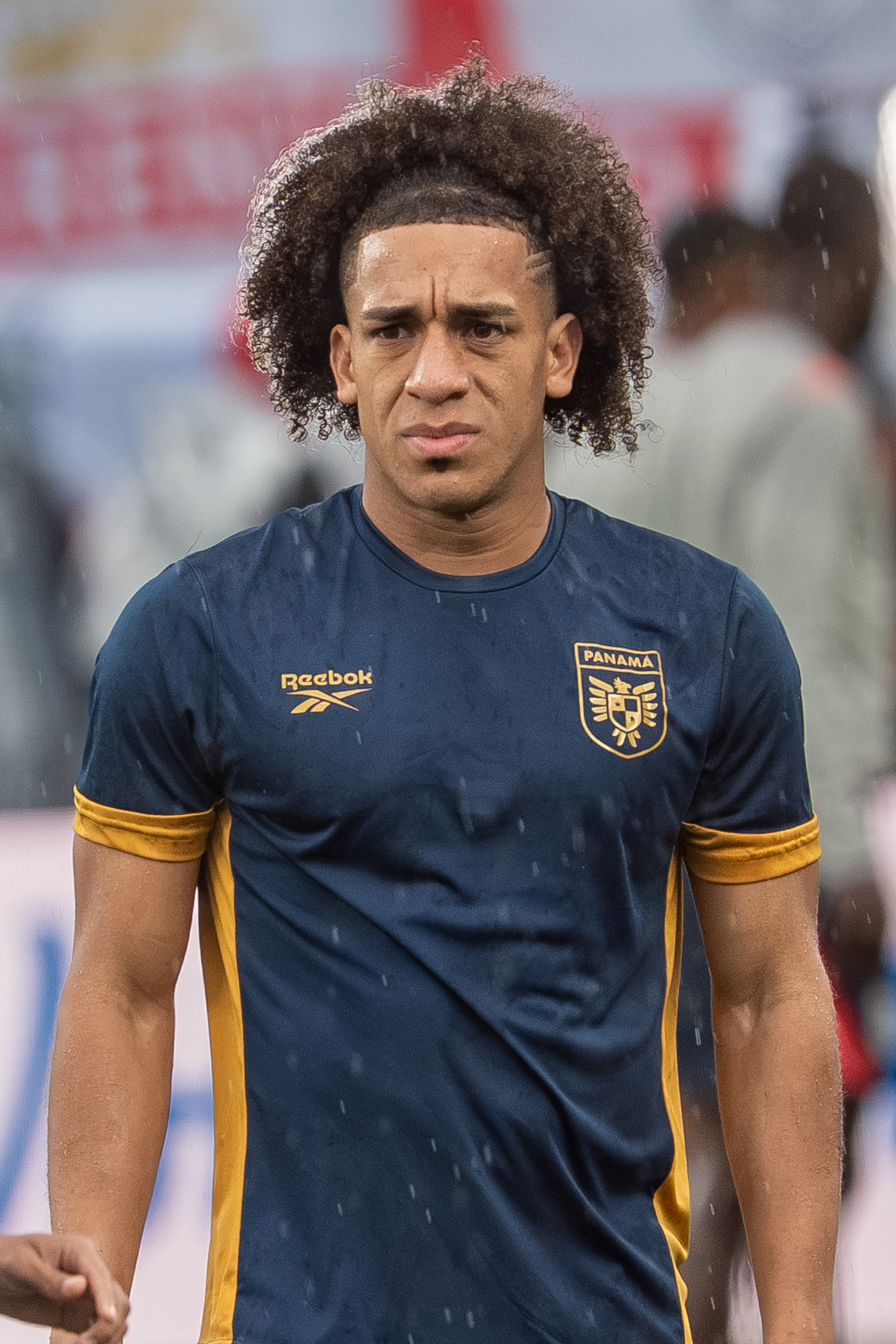
- Carrasquilla with Panama in 2026

Personal information
- Full name: Adalberto Eliécer Carrasquilla Alcázar
- Date of birth: 28 November 1998 (age 27)
- Place of birth: Panama City, Panama
- Height: 1.72 m (5 ft 8 in)
- Position: Midfielder

Team information
- Current team: Pumas UNAM
- Number: 8

Senior career*
Years	Team	Apps	(Gls)
2014–2019	Tauro	86	(4)
2019	→ Cartagena (loan)	8	(0)
2020–2022	Cartagena	38	(1)
2021–2022	→ Houston Dynamo (loan)	20	(1)
2022–2024	Houston Dynamo	81	(8)
2025–	Pumas UNAM	60	(3)

International career^{‡}
2017	Panama U20	3	(0)
2018–	Panama	76	(3)
Medal record
Men's football
Representing Panama
CONCACAF Gold Cup
Runner-up	2023 United States–Canada	Team
CONCACAF Nations League
Runner-up	2025 United States	Team
- * Club domestic league appearances and goals as of 23:21, 19 September 2026 (UTC) ‡ National team caps and goals as of 17:30, 5 October 2026 (UTC)

Adalberto Eliécer Carrasquilla Alcázar (born 28 November 1998), commonly known as Coco Carrasquilla is a Panamanian professional footballer who plays as a midfielder for Liga MX club Pumas UNAM and the Panama national team.

== Club career ==
=== Tauro ===
Carrasquilla began his career with Tauro FC in his hometown of Panama City. He made his first team debut on 29 March 2015 during a 1–0 loss to Árabe Unido in a Liga Panameña de Fútbol match at just 16 years old. He scored his first goal on 22 April 2016 to give Tauro a 2–1 win over Árabe Unido. During 5 seasons playing for Tauro, Carrasquilla helped them win the 2017 Clausura and 2018 Apertura league titles.

=== FC Cartagena ===
On 12 August 2019 it was confirmed that Carrasquilla had been loaned out to FC Cartagena, who at the time were playing in Segunda División B, the Spanish third-tier, for the rest of 2019 with an option to buy. He made his debut for Cartagena on 15 September, coming off the bench in a 1–0 win over Atlético Sanluqueño.

On 29 November 2019, Cartagena announced that they had triggered Carrasquilla's purchase option for €300,000 and signed him to a new contract until 2025. Carrasquilla made 20 appearances in all competitions during his first season in Spain, helping Cartagena win promotion to the Segunda División after 8 seasons in the third tier.

He scored his first goal for Cartagena on 24 October 2020 in a 3–0 win against UD Las Palmas. After playing regularly for the first half of the season Cartagena brought in a new head coach in January, Luis Carrión. Carrasquilla featured less frequently over the latter half of the season. He made 28 appearances and scored 1 goal in league play as Cartagena finished 16th in the table, 3 spots and 3 points above the relegation zone.

=== Houston Dynamo ===
On 5 August 2021, Carrasquilla joined MLS side Houston Dynamo on loan. He made his Dynamo debut on 7 August, coming on as a substitute in a 2–0 loss to Minnesota United. He scored his first goal on 28 August in a 2–1 loss to Minnesota United. Carrasquilla ended the season with 10 appearances and 1 goal as Houston finished last in the Western Conference, missing out on the playoffs.

On 10 May 2022, Houston Dynamo activated their purchase option on Carrasquilla's loan, making his move to the Dynamo permanent. The official transfer fee was undisclosed, but was reportedly close to $2 million. Carrasquilla scored his first goal of the season on 14 May in a 2–0 win over Nashville. He finished the season with 2 goals and 4 assists in 32 appearances, but Houston failed to qualify for the playoffs again, finishing 13th in the conference.

=== Pumas UNAM ===
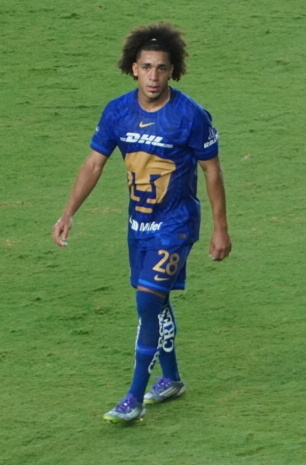
Carrasquilla with Pumas in 2025

On 16 January 2025, Mexican club Pumas announced the signing of Carrasquilla.

== International career ==
Carrasquilla made his debut for the Panama national team on 17 April 2018, coming off the bench in a 1–0 win over Trinidad and Tobago.

On 14 May 2018, he was called up for the preliminary 35-man squad for the 2018 FIFA World Cup but was not named in the final 23.

Carrasquilla scored his first goal for Panama on 8 September 2019 in a 4–1 victory against Bermuda in the CONCACAF Nations League.

On 1 July 2021, Carrasquilla was named to head coach Thomas Christiansen's 23-man squad for the 2021 CONCACAF Gold Cup. Carrasquilla started all 3 games and had an assist as Panama finished 3rd in their group.

In June 2023, Carasquilla was named to the 2023 CONCACAF Gold Cup squad. He was a regular fixture in the line-up as Panama made the Final of the tournament and finished runners-up to Mexico. For his efforts, Carrasquilla was the recipient of the Golden Ball for the tournament.

== Career statistics ==
=== Club ===
As of match played 19 September 2026

Appearances and goals by club, season and competition
Club	Season	League			National cup (Note: Includes Copa Panamá, Copa del Rey, U.S. Open Cup)		Playoffs (Note: Includes Segunda División B play-offs, MLS Cup playoffs)		Continental		Other		Total	
Club	Season	Division	Apps	Goals	Apps	Goals	Apps	Goals	Apps	Goals	Apps	Goals	Apps	Goals
Tauro	2014–15	Liga LPF	5	0	—		—		—		—		5	0
Tauro	2015–16	Liga LPF	11	1	2	0	—		—		—		13	1
Tauro	2016–17	Liga LPF	10	0	0	0	—		—		—		10	0
Tauro	2017–18	Liga LPF	28	1	—		—		4 (Note: Appearances in CONCACAF Champions League/Cup)	0	—		32	1
Tauro	2018–19	Liga LPF	32	2	0	0	—		6 (Note: Appearances in CONCACAF League)	0	—		38	2
Tauro	Total		86	4	2	0	—		10	0	—		98	4
Cartagena (loan)	2019–20	Segunda División B	8	0	0	0	—		—		—		8	0
Cartagena	2019–20	Segunda División B	10	0	1	0	1	0	—		—		12	0
Cartagena	2020–21	Segunda División	28	1	1	0	—		—		—		29	1
Cartagena	Cartagena total		46	1	2	0	1	0	—		—		49	1
Houston Dynamo (loan)	2021	Major League Soccer	10	1	—		—		—		—		10	1
Houston Dynamo (loan)	2022	Major League Soccer	10	0	0	0	—		—		—		10	0
Houston Dynamo (loan)	Total		20	1	0	0	—		—		—		20	1
Houston Dynamo	2022	Major League Soccer	22	2	1	0	—		—		—		23	2
Houston Dynamo	2023	Major League Soccer	30	3	4	1	0	0	—		4 (Note: Appearances in Leagues Cup)	0	38	4
Houston Dynamo	2024	Major League Soccer	29	3	1	0	0	0	4	0	1	0	35	3
Houston Dynamo	Total		81	8	6	1	0	0	4	0	5	0	96	9
Pumas UNAM	2024–25	Liga MX	15	1	—		—		3	0	0	0	18	1
Pumas UNAM	2025–26	Liga MX	38	2	—		—		2	0	3	3	43	5
Pumas UNAM	2026–27	Liga MX	7	0	—		—		0	0	3	0	10	0
Pumas UNAM	Total		60	3	—		—		5	0	6	3	71	6
Career total			273	15	10	1	1	0	17	0	11	3	299	19

=== International ===
As of match played on 5 October 2026

Appearances and goals by national team and year
National team	Year	Apps	Goals
Panama	2018	3	0
Panama	2019	5	1
Panama	2020	2	0
Panama	2021	14	0
Panama	2022	14	0
Panama	2023	15	1
Panama	2024	10	0
Panama	2025	8	1
Panama	2026	5	0
Total		76	3

Scores and results list Panama's goal tally first.

List of international goals scored by Adalberto Carrasquilla
No.	Date	Venue	Opponent	Score	Result	Competition
1.	5 September 2019	Bermuda National Stadium, Hamilton, Bermuda	Bermuda	4–1	4–1	2019–20 CONCACAF Nations League A
2.	17 October 2023	Estadio Rommel Fernández, Panama City, Panama	Guatemala	1–0	3–0	2023–24 CONCACAF Nations League A
3.	20 March 2025	SoFi Stadium, Los Angeles, United States	Mexico	1–1	1–2	2025 CONCACAF Nations League final

== Honours ==
Tauro

- Liga Panameña de Fútbol: 2017 Clausura, 2018 Apertura

Houston Dynamo

- U.S. Open Cup: 2023

Panama

- CONCACAF Gold Cup runner-up: 2023
- CONCACAF Nations League runner-up: 2024–25

Individual

- CONCACAF Gold Cup Golden Ball: 2023
- CONCACAF Gold Cup Best XI: 2023
- CONCACAF Nations League Finals Best XI: 2023
- CONCACAF Men's Player of the Year: 2023–24
