= 2023 CONCACAF Nations League Finals =

Tournament details
- Host country: United States
- Dates: June 15–18
- Teams: 4
- Venue: 1 (in 1 host city)

Final positions
- Champions: United States (2nd title)
- Runners-up: Canada
- Third place: Mexico
- Fourth place: Panama

Tournament statistics
- Matches played: 4
- Goals scored: 8 (2 per match)
- Top scorer(s): (United States) Christian Pulisic (2 goals)
- Best player: (United States) Christian Pulisic
- Best goalkeeper: (United States) Matt Turner

The 2023 CONCACAF Nations League Finals was the final tournament of the 2022–23 edition of the CONCACAF Nations League, the second season of the international football competition involving the men's national teams of the 41 member associations of CONCACAF. The event was held from June 15 to 18, 2023 at Allegiant Stadium in Paradise, Nevada, United States, and was contested by the four group winners of League A.

The United States defeated Canada 2–0 in the final to secure a second consecutive CONCACAF Nations League title.

== Format ==
The CONCACAF Nations League Finals took place in June 2023 and was contested by the four group winners of League A. The tournament took place over four days and was played in single-leg knockout matches, consisting of two semi-finals on June 15, and a third place play-off and final three days after the second semi-final on June 18, 2023.

In the Finals, if the scores were level at the end of normal time:

- In the semi-finals and final, 30 minutes of extra time were played. If the score was still level after extra time, the winner was determined by a penalty shoot-out.
- In the third place play-off, extra time was not played, and the winner was determined by a penalty shoot-out.

== Venue ==
Allegiant Stadium in Paradise, Nevada, within the Las Vegas Area, was announced as the venue for the event on March 20, 2023.

City	Stadium	Location of the host city of the 2023 CONCACAF Nations League Finals.
Paradise (Las Vegas Area)	Allegiant Stadium	Location of the host city of the 2023 CONCACAF Nations League Finals.
Capacity: 61,000		Location of the host city of the 2023 CONCACAF Nations League Finals.

== Qualified teams ==
The four group winners of League A qualified for the Nations League Finals.

Group	Winners	Date of qualification	CONCACAF Rankings May 2023	FIFA Rankings April 2023
A	Mexico	March 26, 2023	1	15
B	Panama	March 28, 2023	5	58
C	Canada	March 28, 2023	4	47
D	United States (host)	March 27, 2023	2	13

== Seeding ==
The four teams were ranked based on their results in the group stage to determine the semi-final matchups. The first seed played the fourth seed and the second seed played the third seed.

Seed	Grp	Team	Pld	W	D	L	GF	GA	GD	Pts
1	D	United States (H)	4	3	1	0	14	2	+12	10
2	B	Panama	4	3	1	0	8	0	+8	10
3	C	Canada	4	3	0	1	11	3	+8	9
4	A	Mexico	4	2	2	0	8	3	+5	8

Source: CONCACAF
Rules for classification: Tiebreakers
(H) Hosts

== Squads ==
Each national team had to submit a squad of 23 players, three of whom had to be goalkeepers, at least ten days before the opening match of the tournament. If a player became injured or ill severely enough to prevent his participation from the tournament before his team's first match, he could be replaced by another player.

== Bracket ==
Semi-finals
June 15 – Paradise
Panama	0
Canada	2
June 15 – Paradise
United States	3
Mexico	0

Final
June 18 – Paradise
Canada	0
United States	2
Third place play-off
June 18 – Paradise
Panama	0
Mexico	1

All times are local, PDT (UTC−7).

== Semi-finals ==
=== Panama vs Canada ===
June 15, 2023
16:00

Panama	0–2	Canada
	Report	David 25'; Davies 70'

Allegiant Stadium, Paradise
Attendance: 65,000
Referee: Juan Gabriel Calderón (Costa Rica)

Panama	Canada

GK	22	Orlando Mosquera
RB	2	César Blackman	(yellow card) 42'
CB	3	Harold Cummings		(substituted off) 82'
CB	4	Fidel Escobar
LB	23	Michael Amir Murillo		(substituted off) 46'
RM	8	Adalberto Carrasquilla	(yellow card) 63'	(substituted off) 86'
CM	10	Yoel Bárcenas		(substituted off) 74'
CM	16	Andrés Andrade
LM	20	Aníbal Godoy (c)	(yellow card) 90'
CF	18	Cecilio Waterman		(substituted off) 74'
CF	11	Ismael Díaz
Substitutions:
DF	15	Eric Davis	(red card) 89'	(substituted on) 46'
MF	6	Cristian Martínez		(substituted on) 74'
FW	9	Azarías Londoño		(substituted on) 74'
MF	7	Jovani Welch		(substituted on) 82'
MF	21	César Yanis		(substituted on) 86'
Manager:
(Spain) Thomas Christiansen

GK	18	Milan Borjan (c)
RB	2	Alistair Johnston	(substituted off) 69'
CB	5	Steven Vitória
CB	4	Kamal Miller
LB	3	Sam Adekugbe	(substituted off) 62'
RM	22	Richie Laryea
CM	7	Stephen Eustáquio
CM	8	Ismaël Koné	(substituted off) 75'
LM	17	Cyle Larin	(substituted off) 75'
CF	20	Jonathan David
CF	11	Tajon Buchanan	(substituted off) 62'
Substitutions:
MF	21	Jonathan Osorio	(substituted on) 62'
FW	19	Alphonso Davies	(substituted on) 62'
DF	23	Scott Kennedy	(substituted on) 69'
MF	13	Atiba Hutchinson	(substituted on) 75'
FW	10	Junior Hoilett	(substituted on) 75'
Manager:
(England) John Herdman

Man of the Match:
Jonathan David (Canada)

Assistant referees:
Juan Carlos Mora (Costa Rica)
Henri Pupiro (Nicaragua)
Fourth official:
Mario Escobar (Guatemala)
Video assistant referee:
Benjamín Pineda (Costa Rica)
Assistant video assistant referee:
Selvin Brown (Honduras)

=== United States vs Mexico ===
The match was temporarily stopped by the referee in the 90th minute due to homophobic chants from the Mexico fans. The referee initially allotted 12 minutes of stoppage time at the end of regulation, but he halted the match in the eighth minute of stoppage time amid more chants (though CONCACAF claimed the match was halted at the referee's discretion).

June 15, 2023
19:00

United States	3–0	Mexico
Pulisic 37', 46'; Pepi 79'	Report

Allegiant Stadium, Paradise
Attendance: 65,000
Referee: Iván Barton (El Salvador)

United States	Mexico

GK	1	Matt Turner
RB	2	Sergiño Dest	(red card) 85'
CB	12	Miles Robinson	(yellow card) 63'	(substituted off) 81'
CB	4	Chris Richards	(yellow card) 86'
LB	5	Antonee Robinson	(yellow card) 60'
CM	8	Weston McKennie	(red card) 71'
CM	6	Yunus Musah
RW	21	Timothy Weah		(substituted off) 81'
AM	7	Giovanni Reyna		(substituted off) 74'
LW	10	Christian Pulisic (c)	(yellow card) 88'	(substituted off) 88'
CF	20	Folarin Balogun		(substituted off) 74'
Substitutions:
MF	14	Luca de la Torre		(substituted on) 74'
FW	9	Ricardo Pepi		(substituted on) 74'
DF	3	Walker Zimmerman		(substituted on) 81'
FW	11	Brenden Aaronson		(substituted on) 81'
DF	19	Joe Scally		(substituted on) 88'
Manager:
B. J. Callaghan (interim)

GK	13	Guillermo Ochoa (c)	(yellow card) 86'
CB	3	César Montes	(red card) 69'
CB	22	Víctor Guzmán
CB	15	Israel Reyes	(yellow card) 59'
RM	19	Jorge Sánchez
CM	4	Edson Álvarez	(yellow card) 86'
CM	18	Luis Chávez
LM	23	Jesús Gallardo		(substituted off) 54'
RF	21	Uriel Antuna	(yellow card) 37'	(substituted off) 77'
CF	20	Henry Martín		(substituted off) 54'
LF	17	Orbelín Pineda		(substituted off) 83'
Substitutions:
FW	9	Ozziel Herrera		(substituted on) 54'
FW	11	Santiago Giménez	(yellow card) 60'	(substituted on) 54'
DF	6	Gerardo Arteaga	(red card) 85'	(substituted on) 77'
MF	16	Sebastián Córdova		(substituted on) 83'
Manager:
(Argentina) Diego Cocca

Man of the Match:
Christian Pulisic (United States)

Assistant referees:
David Morán (El Salvador)
Juan Zumba (El Salvador)
Fourth official:
Walter López (Guatemala)
Video assistant referee:
Tatiana Guzmán (Nicaragua)
Assistant video assistant referee:
Ismael Cornejo (El Salvador)

== Third place play-off ==
June 18, 2023
15:00

Panama	0–1	Mexico
	Report	Gallardo 4'

Allegiant Stadium, Paradise
Attendance: 35,000
Referee: Daneon Parchment (Jamaica)

Panama	Mexico

GK	1	Luis Mejía	(yellow card) 76'
CB	4	Fidel Escobar
CB	3	Harold Cummings
CB	5	Roderick Miller	(yellow card) 90+1'
RWB	10	Yoel Bárcenas
LWB	2	César Blackman
RM	17	José Fajardo
CM	20	Aníbal Godoy (c)	(yellow card) 57'	(substituted off) 65'
CM	8	Adalberto Carrasquilla		(substituted off) 90+4'
LM	11	Ismael Díaz		(substituted off) 83'
CF	19	Alberto Quintero	(yellow card) 34'	(substituted off) 83'
Substitutions:
MF	6	Cristian Martínez	(yellow card) 78'	(substituted on) 65'
FW	13	Freddy Góndola		(substituted on) 83'
FW	18	Cecilio Waterman		(substituted on) 83'
MF	7	Jovani Welch		(substituted on) 90+4'
Manager:
(Spain) Thomas Christiansen

GK	13	Guillermo Ochoa (c)
RB	2	Julián Araujo	(yellow card) 54'
CB	15	Israel Reyes	(yellow card) 85'
CB	5	Johan Vásquez
LB	23	Jesús Gallardo	(yellow card) 45+4'
CM	14	Érick Sánchez	(yellow card) 81'
CM	7	Luis Romo	(yellow card) 27'
CM	18	Luis Chávez
RF	21	Uriel Antuna		(substituted off) 90+5'
CF	11	Santiago Giménez		(substituted off) 87'
LF	9	Ozziel Herrera	(yellow card) 31'	(substituted off) 68'
Substitutions:
FW	17	Orbelín Pineda		(substituted on) 68'
FW	20	Henry Martín		(substituted on) 87'
MF	8	Charly Rodríguez		(substituted on) 90+5'
Manager:
(Argentina) Diego Cocca

Man of the Match:
Jesús Gallardo (Mexico)

Assistant referees:
Ojay Duhaney (Jamaica)
Caleb Wales (Trinidad and Tobago)
Fourth official:
Ismael Cornejo (El Salvador)
Video assistant referee:
Tatiana Guzmán (Nicaragua)
Assistant video assistant referee:
Shirley Perelló (Honduras)

== Final ==
18 June 2023
18:00

Canada	0–2	United States
	Report	Richards 12'; Balogun 34'

Allegiant Stadium, Paradise
Attendance: 35,000
Referee: Saíd Martínez (Honduras)

Canada	United States

GK	18	Milan Borjan (c)
CB	2	Alistair Johnston		(substituted off) 60'
CB	23	Scott Kennedy	(yellow card) 16'	(substituted off) 61'
CB	4	Kamal Miller
RWB	22	Richie Laryea	(yellow card) 45+4'
LWB	19	Alphonso Davies
CM	7	Stephen Eustáquio		(substituted off) 89'
CM	8	Ismaël Koné
CM	21	Jonathan Osorio		(substituted off) 61'
CF	20	Jonathan David
CF	17	Cyle Larin		(substituted off) 76'
Substitutions:
FW	11	Tajon Buchanan		(substituted on) 60'
DF	5	Steven Vitória		(substituted on) 61'
DF	3	Sam Adekugbe		(substituted on) 61'
FW	9	Lucas Cavallini		(substituted on) 76'
FW	10	Junior Hoilett		(substituted on) 89'
Manager:
(England) John Herdman

GK	1	Matt Turner	(yellow card) 81'
RB	19	Joe Scally		(substituted off) 79'
CB	3	Walker Zimmerman
CB	4	Chris Richards
LB	5	Antonee Robinson
CM	11	Brenden Aaronson		(substituted off) 68'
CM	6	Yunus Musah
RW	21	Timothy Weah
AM	7	Giovanni Reyna		(substituted off) 46'
LW	10	Christian Pulisic (c)
CF	20	Folarin Balogun		(substituted off) 76'
Substitutions:
MF	14	Luca de la Torre		(substituted on) 46'
MF	15	Johnny Cardoso	(yellow card) 80'	(substituted on) 68'
FW	9	Ricardo Pepi		(substituted on) 76'
DF	23	Auston Trusty		(substituted on) 79'
Interim manager:
B. J. Callaghan

Man of the Match:
Giovanni Reyna (United States)

Assistant referees:
Walter López (Honduras)
Christian Ramírez (Honduras)
Fourth official:
Selvin Brown (Honduras)
Video assistant referee:
Ricardo Montero (Costa Rica)
Assistant video assistant referee:
Benjamín Pineda (Costa Rica)

== Statistics ==
=== Goalscorers ===
There were 8 goals scored in 4 matches, for an average of 2 goals per match.

2 goals

- (United States) Christian Pulisic

1 goal

- (Canada) Jonathan David
- (Canada) Alphonso Davies
- (Mexico) Jesús Gallardo
- (United States) Folarin Balogun
- (United States) Ricardo Pepi
- (United States) Chris Richards

== Awards ==
CONCACAF announced the following squad as the best eleven of the Finals after the conclusion of the tournament.

Christian Pulisic was named MVP of the tournament, having scored a total of three goals across the group stage and Finals. Matt Turner was named best goalkeeper.

Best XI

Goalkeeper	Defenders	Midfielders	Forwards
(United States) Matt Turner	(Mexico) Jesús Gallardo (United States) Chris Richards (Canada) Steven Vitória	(Panama) Adalberto Carrasquilla (United States) Yunus Musah (Canada) Alphonso Davies (United States) Giovanni Reyna	(United States) Folarin Balogun (United States) Christian Pulisic (Canada) Jonathan David
