= Israel Reyes =

Mexican footballer (born 2000)

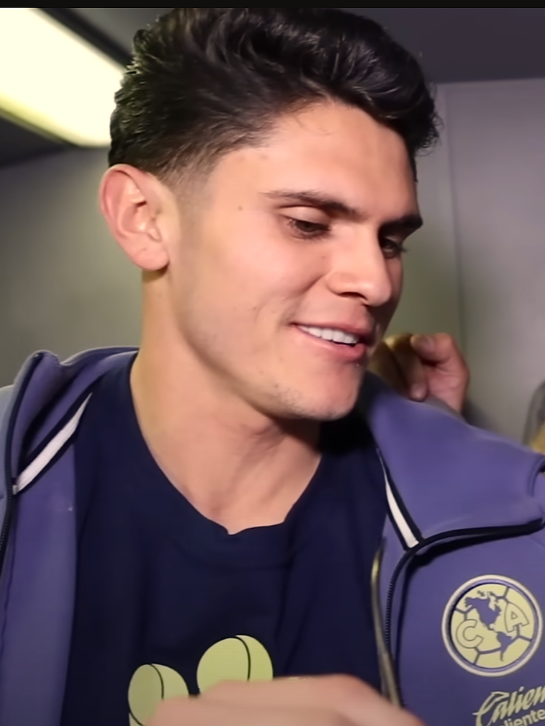
- Reyes with América in 2025

Personal information
- Full name: Israel Reyes Romero
- Date of birth: 23 May 2000 (age 26)
- Place of birth: El Grullo, Jalisco, Mexico
- Height: 1.80 m (5 ft 11 in)
- Positions: Centre-back; right-back; defensive midfielder

Team information
- Current team: América
- Number: 3

Youth career
- 2016–2019: Atlas

Senior career*
Years	Team	Apps	(Gls)
2019–2021	Atlas	1	(0)
2020–2021	→ Puebla (loan)	19	(0)
2021–2022	Puebla	57	(6)
2023–	América	132	(3)

International career^{‡}
2021–	Mexico	43	(2)
Medal record
Men's football
Representing Mexico
CONCACAF Gold Cup
Winner	2023 United States–Canada	Team
Winner	2025 United States–Canada	Team
CONCACAF Nations League
Winner	2025 United States
Third place	2023 United States
- * Club domestic league appearances and goals as of 21 November 2026 ‡ National team caps and goals as of 17 November 2026

Israel Reyes Romero (born 23 May 2000) is a Mexican professional footballer who plays as a centre-back, right-back and defensive midfielder for Liga MX club América and the Mexico national team.

== Club career ==
=== Atlas ===
Reyes commenced his career in the youth academy of Atlas. He made his professional debut on 30 July 2019, in a match that ended in a draw against Pachuca. Four months later, he made his league debut as a substitute in a 2–0 loss to Monterrey.

=== Puebla ===
In the summer of 2020, Reyes joined Puebla on a loan. He faced obstacles in getting playing time during his first tournament, but eventually established himself and secured a permanent transfer.

=== América ===
On 1 December 2022, Reyes signed with América.

== International career ==
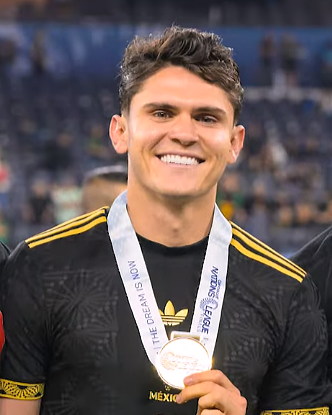
Reyes, following Mexico's victory in the 2025 CONCACAF Nations League Finals

Reyes received his first call-up to the senior national team by Gerardo Martino, and made his debut on 8 December 2021 in a friendly match against Chile, coming in as a substitute in the 65th minute for Jordan Silva.

Reyes was named in the 26-man squad for the 2026 FIFA World Cup, hosted on home soil.

== Career statistics ==
=== Club ===
As of match played on 21 November 2026

Appearances and goals by club, season and competition
Club	Season	League			Cup		Continental		Club World Cup		Other		Total	
Club	Season	Division	Apps	Goals	Apps	Goals	Apps	Goals	Apps	Goals	Apps	Goals	Apps	Goals
Atlas	2019–20	Liga MX	1	0	3	0	—		—		—		4	0
Puebla (loan)	2020–21	Liga MX	19	0	—		—		—		—		19	0
Puebla	2021–22	Liga MX	37	3	—		—		—		—		37	3
Puebla	2022–23	Liga MX	20	3	—		—		—		—		20	3
Puebla	Total		57	6	—		—		—		—		57	6
América	2022–23	Liga MX	17	0	—		—		—		—		17	0
América	2023–24	Liga MX	29	1	—		6 (Note: Appearances in CONCACAF Champions Cup)	0	—		4 (Note: Appearances in Leagues Cup)	0	39	1
América	2024–25	Liga MX	41	2	—		3	0	—		3	0	47	2
América	2025–26	Liga MX	33	0	1 (Note: Appearances in Campeón de Campeones)	0	5	0	1 (Note: Appearance in Club World Cup play-in)	0	3	0	43	0
América	2026–27	Liga MX	12	0	—		—		—		5	0	17	0
América	Total		132	3	1	0	14	0	1	0	15	0	163	3
Career total			209	9	4	0	14	0	1	0	15	0	243	9

=== International ===
As of match played on 17 November 2026

Appearances and goals by national team and year
National team	Year	Apps	Goals
Mexico	2021	1	0
Mexico	2022	2	1
Mexico	2023	11	1
Mexico	2024	4	0
Mexico	2025	9	0
Mexico	2026	16	0
Total		43	2

Scores and results list Mexico's goal tally first.

List of international goals scored by Israel Reyes
No.	Date	Venue	Opponent	Score	Result	Competition
1.	11 June 2022	Estadio Corona, Torreón, Mexico	Suriname	1–0	3–0	2022–23 CONCACAF Nations League A
2.	10 June 2023	Snapdragon Stadium, San Diego, California	Cameroon	1–1	2–2	Friendly

== Honours ==
América

- Liga MX: Apertura 2023, Clausura 2024, Apertura 2024
- Campeón de Campeones: 2024
- Supercopa de la Liga MX: 2024
- Campeones Cup: 2024

Mexico

- CONCACAF Gold Cup: 2023, 2025
- CONCACAF Nations League: 2024–25

Individual

- Liga MX Best XI: Clausura 2024
- CONCACAF Nations League Finals Best XI: 2025
- Liga MX All-Stars: 2025, 2026
