= Iván Anderson =

Panamanian football player (born 1997)

Personal information
- Full name: Iván Alejandro Anderson Hernández
- Date of birth: 24 November 1997 (age 28)
- Place of birth: Panama City, Panama
- Height: 1.75 m (5 ft 9 in)
- Position: Defender

Team information
- Current team: Universitario

Youth career
- Tauro

Senior career*
Years	Team	Apps	(Gls)
2018–2021	Tauro	68	(5)
2021	Universitario	32	(4)
2022–2023	Monagas	43	(1)
2024–2025	Fortaleza C.E.I.F.	28	(0)
2025–2026	Marathón	38	(1)
2026–	Universitario	7	(1)

International career^{‡}
2019	Panama U22	4	(0)
2019–	Panama	14	(1)
Medal record
Men's football
Representing Panama
CONCACAF Gold Cup
Runner-up	2023 Canada-United States
CONCACAF Nations League
Runner-up	2025 United States
- * Club domestic league appearances and goals as of 2 May 2026 ‡ National team caps and goals as of 4 June 2026

Iván Alejandro Anderson Hernández (born 24 November 1997) is a Panamanian professional footballer who plays as a defender for Liga LPF club Universitario and the Panama national team.

== International career ==
Anderson is a former Panamanian youth national team player. He was part of Panama's squad at the 2019 Pan American Games.

Anderson made his senior team debut on 27 January 2019 in a 3–0 friendly defeat to the United States. On 12 July 2023, he scored his first international goal in extra time of the semi-final of the 2023 CONCACAF Gold Cup against the United States, as the match ended in a 1–1 draw. Panama went on to win the match 5–4 on penalties.

== Career statistics ==
=== International ===
As of match played 3 June 2026

Appearances and goals by national team and year
National team	Year	Apps	Goals
Panama	2019	1	0
Panama	2020	1	0
Panama	2021	0	0
Panama	2022	2	0
Panama	2023	4	1
Panama	2024	3	0
Panama	2025	1	0
Panama	2026	2	0
Total		14	1

Scores and results list Panama's goal tally first, score column indicates score after each Anderson goal.

List of international goals scored by Iván Anderson
No.	Date	Venue	Opponent	Score	Result	Competition
1	12 July 2023	Snapdragon Stadium, San Diego, United States	United States	1–0	1–1	2023 CONCACAF Gold Cup

== Honours ==
Panama

- CONCACAF Gold Cup runner-up: 2023
- CONCACAF Nations League runner-up: 2024–25
