= Janpol Morales =

Panamanian footballer (born 1998)

Personal information
- Full name: Leroy Janpol Morales Napa
- Date of birth: 22 June 1998 (age 28)
- Place of birth: Calidonia, Panamá
- Height: 1.74 m (5 ft 9 in)
- Position: Winger

Team information
- Current team: Cobresal
- Number: 39

Youth career
- Orense
- 2015–2016: Macará
- 2016–2017: CD Bolívar

Senior career*
Years	Team	Apps	(Gls)
2017–2019	Fuerza Amarilla	3	(0)
2017–2018	→ Audaz Octubrino (loan)	16	(2)
2018–2019	→ Olmedo (loan)	7	(0)
2020–2022	Cumbayá	14	(3)
2022–2025	Macará	82	(11)
2026	Comunicaciones	23	(2)
2026–	Cobresal	1	(1)

International career^{‡}
2025–	Panama	4	(0)
- * Club domestic league appearances and goals as of 2 August 2026 ‡ National team caps and goals as of 23:27, 10 June 2025 (UTC)

Leroy Janpol Morales Napa (born 22 June 1998) is a Panamanian professional footballer who plays as winger for Liga de Primera club Cobresal and the Panama national team.

== Career ==
Morales is a youth product of the Ecuadorian clubs Orense, Macará and CD Bolívar. He began his senior career with Fuerza Amarilla in 2017 in the Ecuadorian Serie A. He joined Audaz Octubrino on loan for the 2018 season, where he helped them win the Segunda Categoría de El Oro. The following season, he joined Olmedo on loan where he was assigned to their U20s. In January 2020 he moved to Cumbayá and in his debut season helped them win the 2021 Ecuadorian Serie B and earned promotion.

On 13 June 2022, he transferred to Macará in the Ecuadorian Serie A. They were relegated that season, but won the Ecuadorian Serie B league in 2023 returning them once more to the Ecuadorian first division.

In July 2026, Morales moved to Chile and signed with Cobresal from Guatemalan club Comunicaciones.

== International career ==
Morales was born in Panama to Ecuadorian parents, and moved to Ecuador at the age of 2. He holds dual Panamanian-Ecuadorian citizenship. On 8 February 2025, he debuted with the senior Panama national team as a substitute in a 6–1 friendly loss to Chile.

== Career statistics ==
=== International ===
As of match 10 June 2025

Appearances and goals by national team and year
National team	Year	Apps	Goals
Panama	2025	4	0
Total		4	0

== Honours ==
Audaz Octubrino

- Segunda Categoría de El Oro: 2018

Cumbayá

- Ecuadorian Serie B: 2021

Macará

- Ecuadorian Serie B: 2023

Panama

- CONCACAF Nations League runner-up: 2024–25
