= Jorge Gutiérrez (footballer) =

Panamanian football player (born 1998)

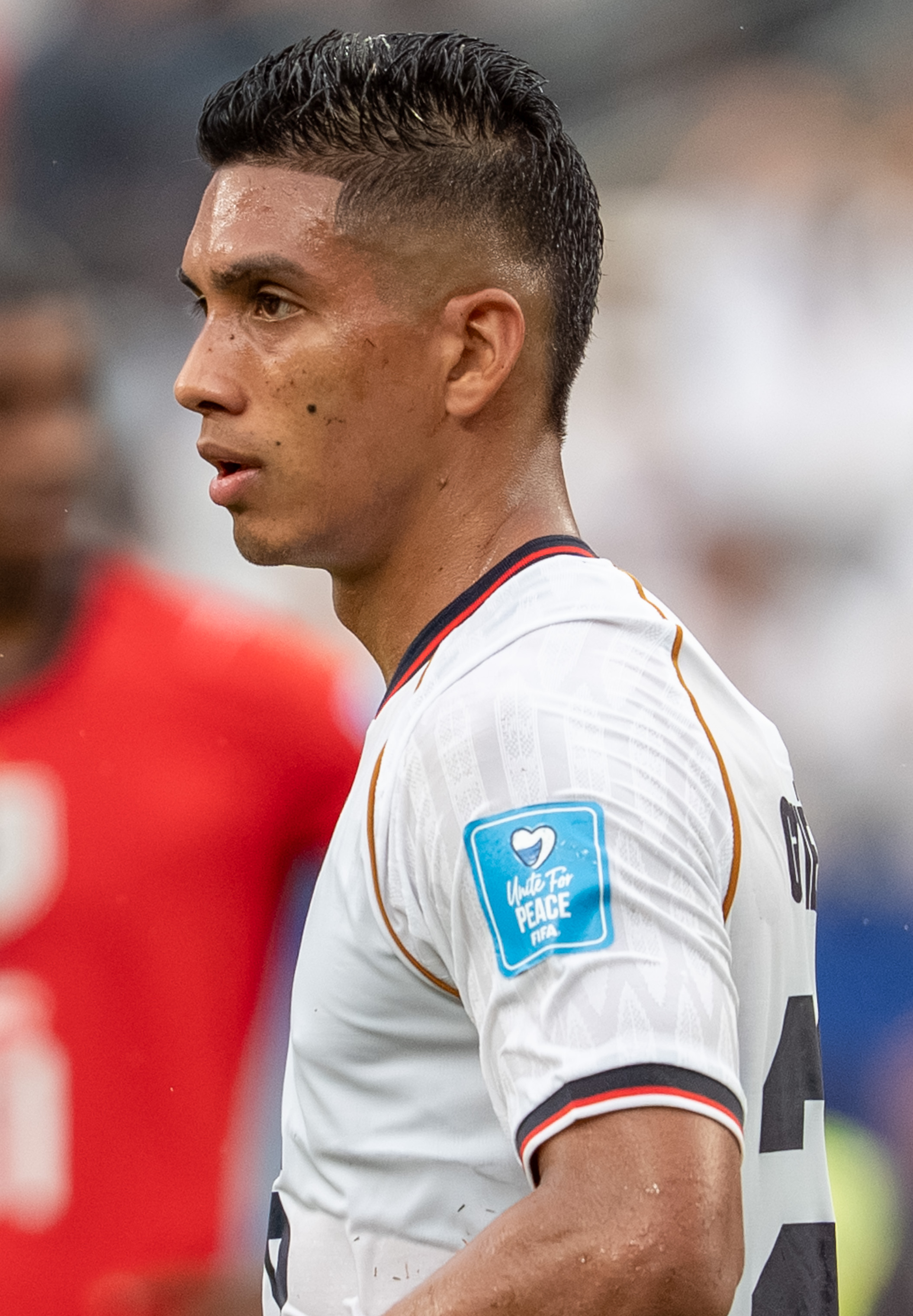
- Gutiérrez with Panama in 2026

Personal information
- Full name: Jorge Abdiel Gutiérrez Cornejo
- Date of birth: 1 September 1998 (age 28)
- Place of birth: Panama City, Panama
- Height: 1.71 m (5 ft 7 in)
- Position: Left-back

Team information
- Current team: Universitario de Deportes

Youth career
- Tauro

Senior career*
Years	Team	Apps	(Gls)
2015–2022	Tauro	141	(3)
2020–2021	→ Melilla (loan)	23	(1)
2022–	Deportivo La Guaira	105	(5)
2026–	→ Universitario de Deportes (loan)	2	(0)

International career^{‡}
2017	Panama U20	1	(0)
2019	Panama U22	3	(0)
2022–	Panama	22	(0)
- * Club domestic league appearances and goals as of 22:48, 19 September 2026 (UTC) ‡ National team caps and goals as of 23:44, 5 October 2026 (UTC)

Jorge Abdiel Gutiérrez Cornejo (born 1 September 1998) is a Panamanian football player who plays as left-back for Universitario de Deportes, and the Panama national team.

== Career ==
Gutiérrez began his senior career with the Panamanian club Tauro, where he spent his entire youth career. For the 2020–21 season, he joined the Spanish club Melilla on loan in the Primera División RFEF. On 28 December 2022, he transferred to the Venezuelan Primera División side Deportivo La Guaira.

== International career ==
Gutiérrez made his debut for the Panama national team in a 0-0 friendly tie with Peru on 16 January 2022. After 3 years away, Gutierrez would return to the national team in 2025, playing huge roles in the CONCACAF nations league, World Cup qualifiers and Gold Cup.

== Career statistics ==
=== International ===
As of match played 5 October 2026

Appearances and goals by national team and year
National team	Year	Apps	Goals
Panama	2022	3	0
Panama	2025	13	0
Panama	2026	6	0
Total		22	0

== Honours ==
Tauro F.C.

- Liga Panameña de Fútbol: 2016-17 Clausura, 2018-19 Clausura, 2019 Apertura, 2021 Clausura

Deportivo La Guaira

- Copa Venezuela: 2024

Panama

- CONCACAF Nations League runner-up: 2024–25
