= Cecilio Waterman =

Panamanian footballer (born 1991)

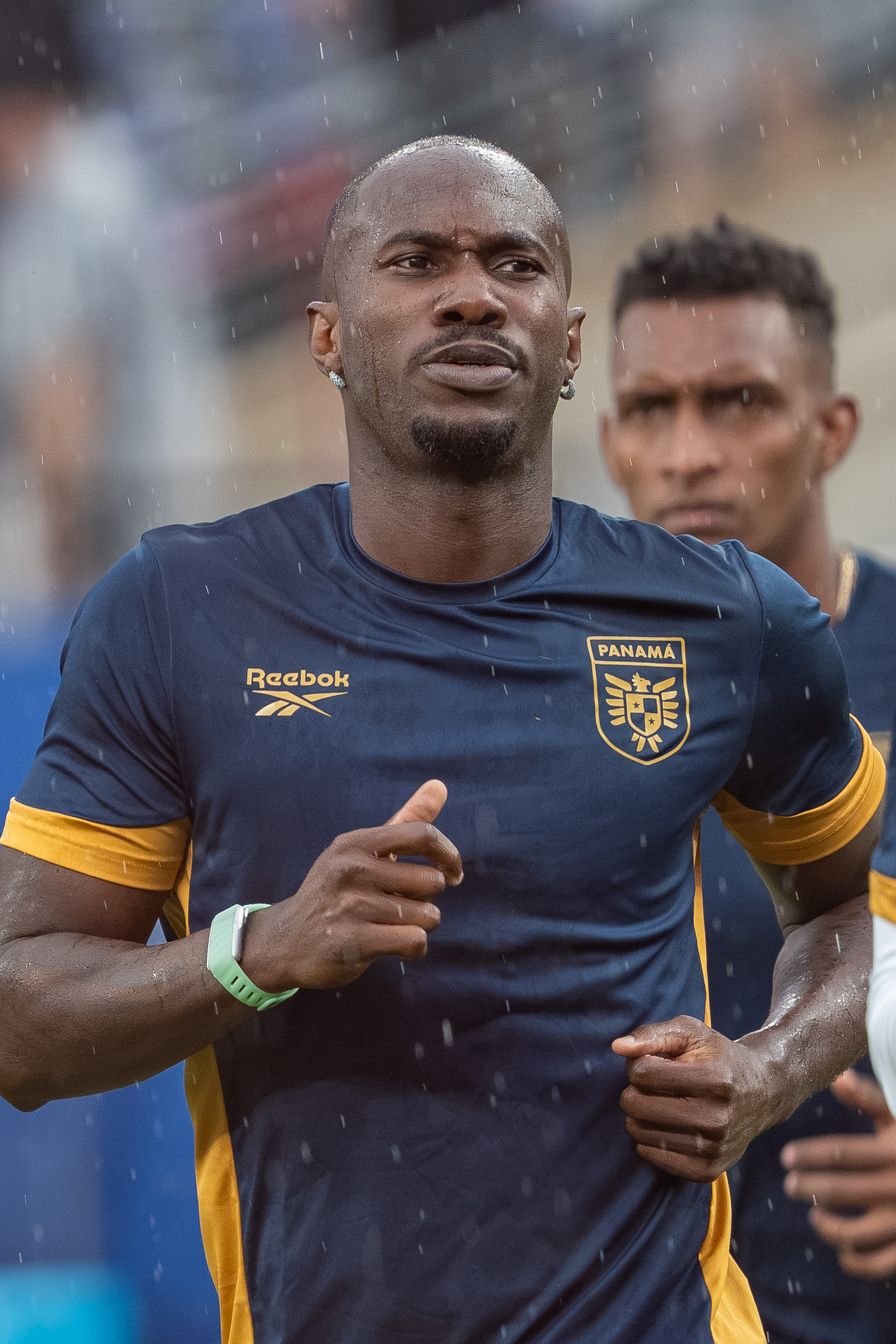
- Waterman with Panama in 2026

Personal information
- Full name: Cecilio Alfonso Waterman Ruiz
- Date of birth: 13 April 1991 (age 35)
- Place of birth: Panama City, Panama
- Height: 1.81 m (5 ft 11 in)
- Positions: Striker; winger

Team information
- Current team: Universidad de Concepción

Youth career
- 2007–2009: Río Abajo
- 2010: Sporting San Miguelito

Senior career*
Years	Team	Apps	(Gls)
2010	Sporting San Miguelito	4	(1)
2011–2020	Fénix	127	(18)
2016	→ Venados (loan)	9	(0)
2017–2018	→ Defensor Sporting (loan)	17	(0)
2019	→ Plaza Colonia (loan)	32	(16)
2020–2022	Universidad de Concepción	32	(17)
2021	→ Everton (loan)	23	(6)
2022	→ Cobresal (loan)	24	(11)
2023	Cobresal	25	(10)
2024	Alianza Lima	15	(5)
2025	Coquimbo Unido	27	(11)
2026–	Universidad de Concepción	11	(3)

International career^{‡}
2011	Panama U20	9	(6)
2012	Panama U23	4	(1)
2010–2026	Panama	57	(15)
Medal record
Men's football
Representing Panama
CONCACAF Gold Cup
Runner-up	2023 United States–Canada	Team
CONCACAF Nations League
Runner-up	2025 United States	Team
- * Club domestic league appearances and goals as of 23 May 2026 ‡ National team caps and goals as of 08:15, 24 June 2026 (UTC)

Cecilio Alfonso Waterman Ruiz (born 13 April 1991) is a Panamanian professional footballer who plays as a striker for Chilean club Universidad de Concepción.

== Club career ==
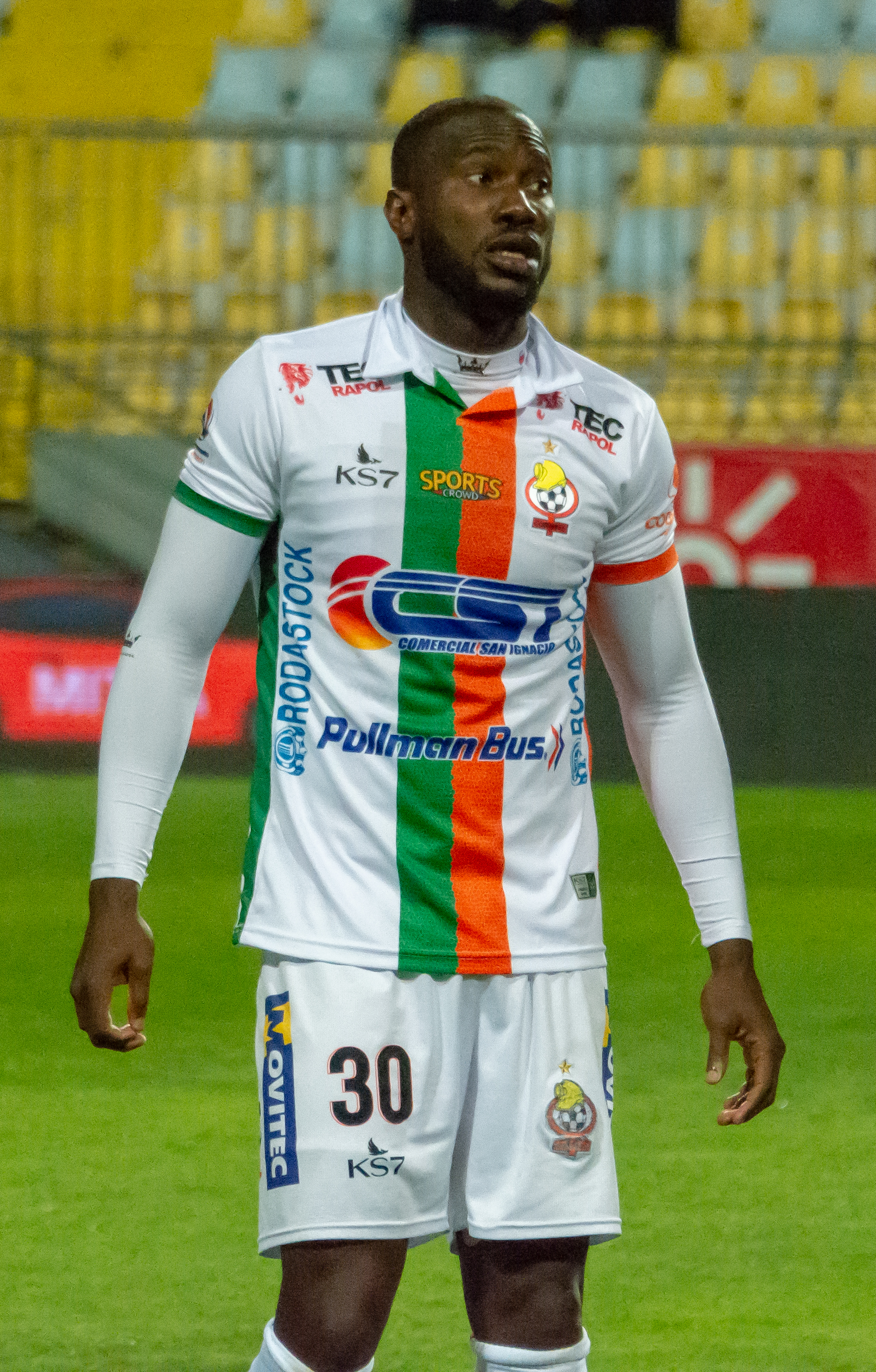
Waterman with Cobresal in 2023

Waterman made his professional debut with Sporting San Miguelito on 26 September 2010 in a match against Atlético Chiriquí in Panama.

In mid-2011, he was transferred to the Uruguayan club Centro Atlético Fénix, where he scored his first goal in May 2012 against Racing.

In 2022 and 2023, he played for Chilean Primera División club Cobresal, finishing as runners-up in the 2023 season.

One year later, he signed with Peruvian club Alianza Lima to play in the 2024 Liga 1 season.

In 2025, Waterman returned to Chile to join Coquimbo Unido, contributing to the club's first Chilean top-flight title. He left them at the end of the season.

On 25 December 2025, Waterman returned to Universidad de Concepción after his stint in 2020–21.

== International career ==
Waterman was part of the Panama U-20 squad for the 2011 CONCACAF U-20 Championship where he scored four goals helping his country qualify to the Youth World Cup in Colombia.

He made his senior debut for Panama in a December 2010 friendly match against Honduras and has, as of 15 August 2015, earned a total of 7 caps, scoring no goals. In 2013, he was called up by Julio Dely Valdés to play the 2013 CONCACAF Gold Cup.

On 20 March 2025 Waterman scored a late winning goal against the United States, taking Panama to the final of the CONCACAF Nations League for the first time in their history after losing two prior semi-finals.

== Career statistics ==
=== International ===
As of match played 23 June 2026

Appearances and goals by national team and year
National team	Year	Apps	Goals
Panama	2010	1	0
Panama	2012	1	0
Panama	2013	5	0
Panama	2019	1	0
Panama	2020	2	0
Panama	2021	8	7
Panama	2022	4	1
Panama	2023	15	2
Panama	2024	3	0
Panama	2025	10	4
Panama	2026	7	1
Total		57	15

Scores and results list Panama's goal tally first, score column indicates score after each Waterman goal.

List of international goals scored by Cecilio Waterman
No.	Date	Venue	Opponent	Score	Result	Competition
1	5 June 2021	Estadio Nacional, Panama City, Panama	Anguilla	2–0	13–0	2022 FIFA World Cup qualification
2	5 June 2021	Estadio Nacional, Panama City, Panama	Anguilla	6–0	13–0	2022 FIFA World Cup qualification
3	8 June 2021	Estadio Nacional, Panama City, Panama	Dominican Republic	3–0	3–0	2022 FIFA World Cup qualification
4	12 June 2021	Estadio Nacional, Panama City, Panama	Curaçao	2–0	2–1	2022 FIFA World Cup qualification
5	5 September 2021	Independence Park, Kingston, Jamaica	Jamaica	3–0	3–0	2022 FIFA World Cup qualification
6	12 November 2021	Estadio Olímpico Metropolitano, San Pedro Sula, Honduras	Honduras	1–2	3–2	2022 FIFA World Cup qualification
7	16 November 2021	Estadio Rommel Fernández, Panama City, Panama	El Salvador	1–1	2–1	2022 FIFA World Cup qualification
8	2 June 2022	Estadio Rommel Fernández, Panama City, Panama	Costa Rica	2–0	2–0	2022–23 CONCACAF Nations League A
9	7 September 2023	Estadio Universitario, Penonomé, Panama	Martinique	3–0	3–0	2023–24 CONCACAF Nations League A
10	16 November 2023	Estadio Ricardo Saprissa Aymá, San José, Costa Rica	Costa Rica	3–0	3–0	2023–24 CONCACAF Nations League A
11	8 February 2025	Estadio Nacional Julio Martínez Prádanos, Santiago, Chile	Chile	1–3	1–6	Friendly
12	20 March 2025	SoFi Stadium, Inglewood, United States	United States	1–0	1–0	2025 CONCACAF Nations League Finals
13	13 November 2025	Estadio Manuel Felipe Carrera, Guatemala City, Guatemala	Guatemala	1–0	3–2	2026 FIFA World Cup qualification
14	13 November 2025	Estadio Manuel Felipe Carrera, Guatemala City, Guatemala	Guatemala	2–0	3–2	2026 FIFA World Cup qualification
15	3 June 2026	Estadio Rommel Fernández, Panama City, Panamá	Dominican Republic	3–1	4–2	Friendly

== Honours ==
Panama

- CONCACAF Gold Cup runner-up: 2013, 2023
- CONCACAF Nations League runner-up: 2024–25

Coquimbo Unido

- Primera División de Chile (1): 2025
