= Tatiana Guzmán =

Nicaraguan football referee (born 1987)

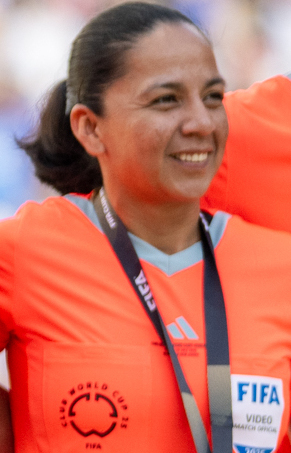
- Guzmán after the 2025 Club World Cup Final
- Full name: Tatiana Auxiliadora Guzmán Alguera
- Born: 12 November 1987 (age 38); Nicaragua
- Other occupation: Football player (formerly)

Domestic
Years	League	Role
2014–	Liga Primera	Referee

International
Years	League	Role
2014–	FIFA listed	Referee
2023-	FIFA listed	VAR

Tatiana Auxiliadora Guzmán Alguera (born 12 November 1987) is a Nicaraguan football referee and video assistant referee. She was the VAR for the 2023 Women's World Cup Final, the AVAR for the 2025 FIFA Club World Cup final, and the standby VAR for the 2026 FIFA World Cup final.

== Biography ==
Guzmán was born on 12 November 1987, in the Batahola Norte neighborhood of Managua. She attended the Central American University (UCA) in Nicaragua, where she earned a degree in Environmental Quality (Calidad Ambiental). Before dedicating herself to refereeing full-time, she worked as a field inspector for the Nicaraguan water and sewerage authority (ENACAL). She was the first female referee to oversee a match in the Liga Primera of Nicaragua.

== International career ==
In 2018, Guzmán made history as the first woman to officiate a men's first-division final in Nicaragua, taking charge of the match between Diriangén and Managua FC.

She has been on the FIFA International Referees List since 2014. Her major tournament appointments include:

- 2023 FIFA Women's World Cup: Served as a Video Match Official (VAR), becoming the first Nicaraguan referee to participate in a World Cup. She was the VAR for the final.
- 2024 Copa América: Member of the first-ever female crew in the tournament's history.
- 2024 Summer Olympics: Appointed as VAR for the football tournaments in Paris.
- 2025 FIFA Club World Cup: Appointed as VAR for the inaugural 32-team tournament in the United States. She was the AVAR for the final.
- 2026 FIFA Men's World Cup: Served as VAR or AVAR for five matches in the group stage, a round of 32 match, and a round of 16 match. She was also the standby VAR for the final.

Tatiana Guzmán was widely criticized by sports pundits and several football figures following a controversial VAR decision in Germany's Round of 32 match against Paraguay at the 2026 FIFA World Cup, where a late extra-time goal by Jonathan Tah was disallowed, contributing to Germany's elimination from the tournament.
