= 1985–86 European Cup Winners' Cup =

Tournament details
- Dates: 18 September 1985 – 2 May 1986
- Teams: 31

Final positions
- Champions: (Soviet Union) Dynamo Kyiv (2nd title)
- Runners-up: (Spain) Atlético Madrid

Tournament statistics
- Matches played: 59
- Goals scored: 191 (3.24 per match)
- Attendance: 1,423,930 (24,134 per match)
- Top scorer(s): Igor Belanov (Dynamo Kyiv); Oleg Blokhin (Dynamo Kyiv); Frank Lippmann (Dynamo Dresden); Oleksandr Zavarov (Dynamo Kyiv); 5 goals each

The 1985–86 European Cup Winners' Cup was won by Dynamo Kyiv in the final against Atlético Madrid. It was their second title in the competition, and first since 1975.

Reigning champions Everton, who initially qualified for the European Cup instead as the 1984–85 Football League champions, and 1985 FA Cup winners Manchester United missed out on European football due to the newly enacted five-year ban on English clubs participating in Europe, following the Heysel Stadium disaster on 29 May 1985.

CSKA Sofia were barred from entering after the riots during the Bulgarian Cup final.

Benfica were given a bye in the 1st round.

== First round ==
Team 1	Agg.	Team 2	1st leg	2nd leg
Rapid Wien (Austria)	6–1	(Hungary) Tatabánya Bányász	5–0	1–1
Fram Reykjavík (Iceland)	3–2	(Northern Ireland) Glentoran	3–1	0–1
Monaco (France)	2–3	(Romania) Universitatea Craiova	2–0	0–3
Utrecht (Netherlands)	3–5	(Soviet Union) Dynamo Kyiv	2–1	1–4
AEL Limassol (Cyprus)	2–6	(Czechoslovakia) Dukla Prague	2–2	0–4
AIK (Sweden)	13–0	(Luxembourg) Red Boys Differdange	8–0	5–0
AEL (Greece)	1–2	(Italy) Sampdoria	1–1	0–1
Lyngby (Denmark)	4–2	(Republic of Ireland) Galway United	1–0	3–2
Red Star Belgrade (Socialist Federal Republic of Yugoslavia)	4–2	(Switzerland) Aarau	2–0	2–2
Fredrikstad (Norway)	1–1 (a)	(Wales) Bangor City	1–1	0–0
Atlético Madrid (Spain)	3–2	(Scotland) Celtic	1–1	2–1
HJK Helsinki (Finland)	5–3	(Albania) Flamurtari	3–2	2–1
Cercle Brugge (Belgium)	4–4 (a)	(East Germany) Dynamo Dresden	3–2	1–2
Żurrieq (Malta)	0–12	(West Germany) Bayer Uerdingen	0–3	0–9
Galatasaray (Turkey)	2–2 (a)	(Poland) Widzew Łódź	1–0	1–2

=== First leg ===
18 September 1985

Rapid Wien (Austria)	5–0	(Hungary) Tatabányai Bányász
Halilović 18', 69', 72'; Kienast 58'; Krankl 62'	Report

Gerhard-Hanappi-Stadion, Vienna
Attendance: 14,500
Referee: Ion Craciunescu (Romania)

18 September 1985

Fram Reykjavík (Iceland)	3–1	(Northern Ireland) Glentoran
Torfason 47', 60'; Thorkelsson 85'	Report	Bowers 1'

Laugardalsvöllur, Reykjavík
Attendance: 1,682
Referee: Rolf Eriksson (Sweden)

18 September 1985

Monaco (France)	2–0	(Romania) Universitatea Craiova
Bellone 21'; Genghini 72'	Report

Stade Louis II, Monaco
Attendance: 7,765
Referee: Franz Wöhrer (Austria)

18 September 1985
19:00

Utrecht (Netherlands)	2–1	(Soviet Union) Dynamo Kyiv
Kruys 40' van Loen 63'	Report	Demyanenko 82'

Stadion Nieuw Galgenwaard, Utrecht
Attendance: 16,500
Referee: Raul Nazaré (Portugal)

18 September 1985

AEL Limassol (Cyprus)	2–2	(Czechoslovakia) Dukla Prague
Savva 55'; Farkaš 62'	Report	Korejčík 36'; Pelc 78'

Tsirion Stadium, Limassol
Attendance: 5,911
Referee: Radu Petrescu (Romania)

18 September 1985

AIK (Sweden)	8–0	(Luxembourg) Red Boys Differdange
Andersson 2'; Dahlkvist 5', 59'; Bergman 46', 55'; Lundmark 60'; Zetterlund 77'; Johansson 80'	Report

Råsunda Stadium, Stockholm
Attendance: 2,387
Referee: Simo Ruokonen (Finland)

18 September 1985

AEL (Greece)	1–1	(Italy) Sampdoria
Mitsibonas 39'	Report	Mancini 82'

Alcazar Stadium, Larissa
Attendance: 17,000
Referee: Jan Keizer (Netherlands)

18 September 1985

Lyngby (Denmark)	1–0	(Republic of Ireland) Galway United
Christensen 36'	Report

Idrætsparken, Copenhagen
Attendance: 2,800
Referee: Oli Olsen (Iceland)

18 September 1985

Red Star Belgrade (Socialist Federal Republic of Yugoslavia)	2–0	(Switzerland) Aarau
Musemić 22'; Ǵurovski 72'	Report

Stadion Crvena zvezda, Belgrade
Attendance: 30,172
Referee: Anatoliy Milchenko (Soviet Union)

18 September 1985

Fredrikstad (Norway)	1–1	(Wales) Bangor City
Deunk 87'	Report	Williams 60'

Fredrikstad Stadion, Fredrikstad
Attendance: 2,611
Referee: Eysteinn Gudmundsson (Iceland)

18 September 1985

Atlético Madrid (Spain)	1–1	(Scotland) Celtic
Setién 34'	Report	Johnston 70'

Vicente Calderón Stadium, Madrid
Attendance: 45,000
Referee: Volker Roth (Germany)

18 September 1985

HJK Helsinki (Finland)	3–2	(Albania) KS Flamurtari
Muhonen 8'; Kanerva 25'; Rantanen 34'	Report	Muça 26'; Bubeqi 65'

Helsinki Olympic Stadium, Helsinki
Attendance: 2,166
Referee: Michal Listkiewicz (Poland)

17 September 1985

Cercle Brugge (Belgium)	3–2	(East Germany) Dynamo Dresden
Vanthournout 23'; Raes 26'; Krnčević 81'	Report	Trautmann 55'; Kirsten 75'

Olympiastadion, Bruges
Attendance: 10,000

17 September 1985

Żurrieq (Malta)	0–3	(West Germany) Bayer Uerdingen
	Report	F. Funkel 8', 35'; Guðmundsson 89'

National Stadium, Ta' Qali
Attendance: 2,670

18 September 1985

Galatasaray (Turkey)	1–0	(Poland) Widzew Łódź
Önal 13' (pen.)	Report

Ali Sami Yen Stadium, Istanbul
Attendance: 34,247

=== Second leg ===
2 October 1985

Tatabányai Bányász (Hungary)	1–1	(Austria) Rapid Wien
Schmidt 50'	Report	Weinhofer 61'

Bányász Stadion, Tatabánya
Attendance: 6,000

2 October 1985

Glentoran (Northern Ireland)	1–0	(Iceland) Fram Reykjavík
Mullan 85'	Report

The Oval, Belfast
Attendance: 2,260

2 October 1985

Universitatea Craiova (Romania)	3–0	(France) Monaco
Geolgău 19', 81'; Bâcu 78' (pen.)	Report

Stadionul Central, Craiova
Attendance: 40,000
Referee: Aron Schmidhuber (West Germany)

2 October 1985
19:00

Dynamo Kyiv (Soviet Union)	4–1	(Netherlands) Utrecht
Blokhin 10'; Yaremchuk 20'; Zavarov 55'; Yevtushenko 60'	Report	de Kruijk 8'

Republican Stadium, Kyiv
Attendance: 94,720
Referee: Talat Tokat (Turkey)

Dynamo Kyiv won 5–3 on aggregate.

2 October 1985

Dukla Prague (Czechoslovakia)	4–0	(Cyprus) AEL Limassol
Luhový 29'; Pelc 47', 65'; Vízek 57'	Report

Stadion Juliska, Prague
Attendance: 2,030
Referee: Vladimir Kuznetsov (Soviet Union)

2 October 1985

Red Boys Differdange (Luxembourg)	0–5	(Sweden) AIK
	Report	Sundin 9'; Bergman 14'; Göransson 26'; Andersson 80'; Johansson 88'

Stade du Thillenberg, Differdange
Attendance: 341

2 October 1985

Sampdoria (Italy)	1–0	(Greece) AEL
Mancini 41'	Report

Stadio Luigi Ferraris, Genoa
Attendance: 33,840

2 October 1985

Galway United (Republic of Ireland)	2–3	(Denmark) Lyngby
Murphy 63'; Bonner 78'	Report	Christensen 9'; Schäfer 42'; Lyng 86'

Galway Sportsgrounds, Galway
Attendance: 2,932

2 October 1985

Aarau (Switzerland)	2–2	(Socialist Federal Republic of Yugoslavia) Red Star Belgrade
Meyer 7'; Zwahlen 37'	Report	Musemić 3'; Janković 17'

Letzigrund, Zürich
Attendance: 11,200

2 October 1985

Bangor City (Wales)	0–0	(Norway) Fredrikstad
	Report

Farrar Road, Bangor
Attendance: 3,428

2 October 1985

Celtic (Scotland)	1–2	(Spain) Atlético Madrid
Aitken 73'	Report	Setién 39'; Ramos 72'

Celtic Park, Glasgow
Attendance: 150

2 October 1985

KS Flamurtari (Albania)	1–2	(Finland) HJK Helsinki
Ruci 11'	Report	Valla 9', 30'

Flamurtari Stadium, Vlore
Attendance: 11,000

2 October 1985

Dynamo Dresden (East Germany)	2–1	(Belgium) Cercle Brugge
Pilz 37'; Lippmann 48'	Report	Krnčević 47'

Rudolf-Harbig-Stadion, Dresden
Attendance: 36,000

2 October 1985

Bayer Uerdingen (West Germany)	9–0	(Malta) Żurrieq
Bommer 13', 32'; F. Funkel 22'; Raschid 29', 49'; Loontiens 37', 82'; Puszamszies 72'; Feilzer 76'	Report

Grotenburg-Stadion, Krefeld
Attendance: 8,000

2 October 1985

Widzew Łódź (Poland)	2–1	(Turkey) Galatasaray
Cisek 1'; Leszczyk 90'	Report	Keser 54'

Stadion Widzewa, Łódź
Attendance: 12,620

== Second round ==
Team 1	Agg.	Team 2	1st leg	2nd leg
Rapid Wien (Austria)	4–2	(Iceland) Fram Reykjavík	3–0	1–2
Universitatea Craiova (Romania)	2–5	(Soviet Union) Dynamo Kyiv	2–2	0–3
Dukla Prague (Czechoslovakia)	3–2	(Sweden) AIK	1–0	2–2
Benfica (Portugal)	2–1	(Italy) Sampdoria	2–0	0–1
Lyngby (Denmark)	3–5	(Socialist Federal Republic of Yugoslavia) Red Star Belgrade	2–2	1–3
Bangor City (Wales)	0–3	(Spain) Atlético Madrid	0–2	0–1
HJK Helsinki (Finland)	3–7	(East Germany) Dynamo Dresden	1–0	2–7
Bayer Uerdingen (West Germany)	3–1	(Turkey) Galatasaray	2–0	1–1

=== First leg ===
23 October 1985

Rapid Wien (Austria)	3–0	(Iceland) Fram Reykjavík
Kranjčar 8'; Pacult 80', 85'	Report

Gerhard-Hanappi-Stadion, Vienna
Attendance: 14,500

23 October 1985
14:00

Universitatea Craiova (Romania)	2–2	(Soviet Union) Dynamo Kyiv
Bâcu 13', 81' (pen.)	Report	Zavarov 17', 23'

Stadionul Central, Craiova
Attendance: 27,796
Referee: Yordan Zhezhov (Bulgaria)

23 October 1985

Dukla Prague (Czechoslovakia)	1–0	(Sweden) AIK
Korejčík 7'	Report

Stadion Juliska, Prague
Attendance: 2,512

23 October 1985

Benfica (Portugal)	2–0	(Italy) Sampdoria
Diamantino 47'; Rui Águas 89'	Report

Estádio da Luz, Lisbon
Attendance: 75,000
Referee: Vojtěch Christov (Czechoslovakia)

23 October 1985

Lyngby (Denmark)	2–2	(Socialist Federal Republic of Yugoslavia) Red Star Belgrade
Christensen 4'; Spangsborg 40'	Report	Đurovski 53'; Mrkela 60'

Lyngby Stadion, Lyngby
Attendance: 4,800

23 October 1985

Bangor City (Wales)	0–2	(Spain) Atlético Madrid
	Report	da Silva 5'; Setién 25'

Farrar Road Stadium, Bangor
Attendance: 5,181

23 October 1985

HJK Helsinki (Finland)	1–0	(East Germany) Dynamo Dresden
Lee 50'	Report

Helsinki Olympic Stadium, Helsinki
Attendance: 3,454

23 October 1985

Bayer Uerdingen (West Germany)	2–0	(Turkey) Galatasaray
Schäfer 35'; Bommer 85'	Report

Grotenburg-Stadion, Krefeld
Attendance: 25,500

=== Second leg ===
6 November 1985

Fram Reykjavík (Iceland)	2–1	(Austria) Rapid Wien
Jónsson 17'; Torfason 88' (pen.)	Report	Pacult 60'

Laugardalsvöllur, Reykjavík
Attendance: 1,109

6 November 1985
19:00

Dynamo Kyiv (Soviet Union)	3–0	(Romania) Universitatea Craiova
Rats 7'; Belanov 11'; Demyanenko 13'	Report

Republican Stadium, Kyiv
Attendance: 100,062
Referee: Lajos Németh (Hungary)

Dynamo Kyiv won 5–2 on aggregate.

6 November 1985

AIK (Sweden)	2–2	(Czechoslovakia) Dukla Prague
Dahlkvist 14'; Zetterlund 89'	Report	Vízek 13', 60'

Råsunda Stadium, Stockholm
Attendance: 3,200

6 November 1985

Sampdoria (Italy)	1–0	(Portugal) Benfica
Lorenzo 51'	Report

Stadio Luigi Ferraris, Genoa
Attendance: 28,881
Referee: Volker Roth (West Germany)

22 November 1985

Red Star Belgrade (Socialist Federal Republic of Yugoslavia)	3–1	(Denmark) Lyngby
Šugar 25'; Nikolić 63'; Đurović 84'	Report	Vilmar 59'

Stadion Crvena zvezda, Belgrade
Attendance: 24,953

6 November 1985

Atlético Madrid (Spain)	1–0	(Wales) Bangor City
Landáburu 23'	Report

Vicente Calderón Stadium, Madrid
Attendance: 14,000

6 November 1985

Dynamo Dresden (East Germany)	7–2	(Finland) HJK Helsinki
Sammer 19', 42'; Lippmann 20', 69'; Trautmann 40'; Pilz 57'; Kirsten 90'	Report	Lee 49'; Valvee 61'

Rudolf-Harbig-Stadion, Dresden
Attendance: 36,000

5 November 1985

Galatasaray (Turkey)	1–1	(West Germany) Bayer Uerdingen
Prekazi 81'	Report	Herget 34'

Ali Sami Yen Stadium, Istanbul
Attendance: 23,777

== Quarter-finals ==
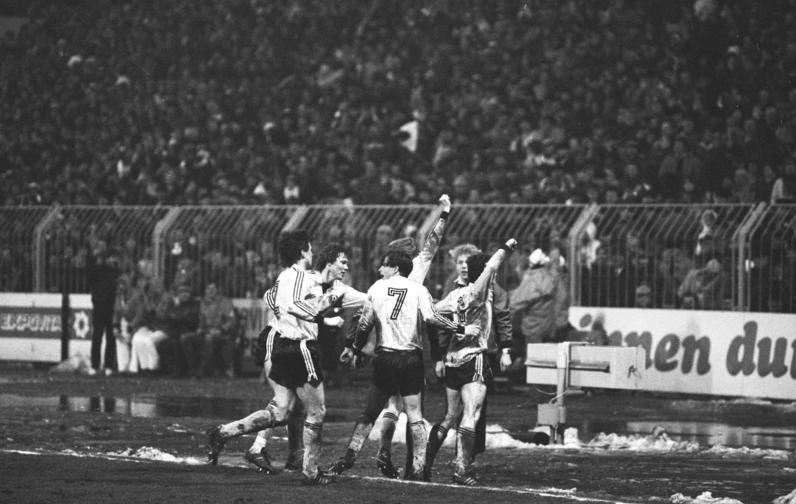
Frank Lippmann celebrates scoring Dresden's first goal against Uerdingen, with (L-R) Jörg Stübner, Matthias Döschner and Andreas Trautmann.

Team 1	Agg.	Team 2	1st leg	2nd leg
Rapid Wien (Austria)	2–9	(Soviet Union) Dynamo Kyiv	1–4	1–5
Dukla Prague (Czechoslovakia)	(a) 2–2	(Portugal) Benfica	1–0	1–2
Red Star Belgrade (Socialist Federal Republic of Yugoslavia)	1–3	(Spain) Atlético Madrid	0–2	1–1
Dynamo Dresden (East Germany)	5–7	(West Germany) Bayer Uerdingen	2–0	3–7

=== First leg ===
5 March 1986
20:00

Rapid Wien (Austria)	1–4	(Soviet Union) Dynamo Kyiv
Willfurth 84'	Report	Belanov 55', 61'; Rats 68'; Yakovenko 74'

Gerhard Hanappi Stadium, Vienna
Attendance: 13,000
Referee: Michel Vautrot (France)

5 March 1986

Dukla Prague (Czechoslovakia)	1–0	(Portugal) Benfica
Luhový 14'	Report

Stadion Juliska, Prague
Attendance: 20,083
Referee: Marcel Van Langenhove (Belgium)

5 March 1986

Red Star Belgrade (Socialist Federal Republic of Yugoslavia)	0–2	(Spain) Atlético Madrid
	Report	da Silva 29', 89'

Stadion Crvena zvezda, Belgrade
Attendance: 56,565

5 March 1986

Dynamo Dresden (East Germany)	2–0	(West Germany) Bayer Uerdingen
Lippmann 50'; Pilz 62'	Report

Rudolf-Harbig-Stadion, Dresden
Attendance: 36,000

=== Second leg ===
19 March 1986
19:00

Dynamo Kyiv (Soviet Union)	5–1	(Austria) Rapid Wien
Yaremchuk 7', 32'; Belanov 12' (pen.); Blokhin 43'; Yevtushenko 79'	Report	Halilović 27'

Republican Stadium, Kyiv
Attendance: 95,010
Referee: Ronald Bridges (Wales)

Dynamo Kyiv won 9–2 on aggregate.

19 March 1986

Benfica (Portugal)	2–1	(Czechoslovakia) Dukla Prague
Carlos Manuel 19'; Manniche 37' (pen.)	Report	Korejčík 65'

Estádio da Luz, Lisbon
Attendance: 75,000
Referee: Siegfried Kirschen (East Germany)

2–2 on aggregate. Dukla Prague won on away goals.

19 March 1986

Atlético Madrid (Spain)	1–1	(Socialist Federal Republic of Yugoslavia) Red Star Belgrade
Marina 7'	Report	Đurović 82'

Vicente Calderón Stadium, Madrid
Attendance: 42,000

19 March 1986

Bayer Uerdingen (West Germany)	7–3	(East Germany) Dynamo Dresden
W. Funkel 13', 58' (pen.), 81' (pen.); Guðmundsson 63'; Schäfer 65', 86'; Klinger 78'	Report	Minge 1'; Lippmann 35'; Bommer 42' (o.g.)

Grotenburg-Stadion, Krefeld
Attendance: 16,000
Referee: Lajos Németh (Hungary)

== Semi-finals ==
Team 1	Agg.	Team 2	1st leg	2nd leg
Dynamo Kyiv (Soviet Union)	4–1	(Czechoslovakia) Dukla Prague	3–0	1–1
Atlético Madrid (Spain)	4–2	(West Germany) Bayer Uerdingen	1–0	3–2

=== First leg ===
2 April 1986
19:00

Dynamo Kyiv (Soviet Union)	3–0	(Czechoslovakia) Dukla Prague
Blokhin 7', 37'; Zavarov 35'	Report

Republican Stadium, Kyiv
Attendance: 90,000
Referee: José Rosa dos Santos (Portugal)

2 April 1986

Atlético Madrid (Spain)	1–0	(West Germany) Bayer Uerdingen
Julio Prieto 79'	Report

Vicente Calderón Stadium, Madrid
Attendance: 50,000

=== Second leg ===
16 April 1986
17:00

Dukla Prague (Czechoslovakia)	1–1	(Soviet Union) Dynamo Kyiv
Kříž 71'	Report	Belanov 63' (pen.)

Stadion Juliska, Prague
Attendance: 14,665
Referee: Ioan Igna (Romania)

Dynamo Kyiv won 4–1 on aggregate.

15 April 1986

Bayer Uerdingen (West Germany)	2–3	(Spain) Atlético Madrid
Herget 55'; Guðmundsson 64'	Report	Rubio 16' (pen.); Cabrera 28'; Julio Prieto 58'

Grotenburg-Stadion, Krefeld
Attendance: 25,650

== Final ==
2 May 1986
20:15

Atlético Madrid (Spain)	0–3	(Soviet Union) Dynamo Kyiv
	Report	Zavarov 4'; Blokhin 85'; Yevtushenko 87'

Stade de Gerland, Lyon
Attendance: 39,300
Referee: Franz Woehrer (Austria)

== Top scorers ==
Rank	Name	Team	Goals
1	(Soviet Union) Igor Belanov	(Soviet Union) Dynamo Kyiv	5
1	(Soviet Union) Oleg Blokhin	(Soviet Union) Dynamo Kyiv	5
1	(East Germany) Frank Lippmann	(East Germany) Dynamo Dresden	5
1	(Soviet Union) Oleksandr Zavarov	(Soviet Union) Dynamo Kyiv	5
5	(Socialist Federal Republic of Yugoslavia) Sulejman Halilović	(Austria) Rapid Wien	4
6	(Sweden) Thomas Bergman	(Sweden) AIK	3
6	(Romania) Marian Bâcu	(Romania) Universitatea Craiova	3
6	(West Germany) Rudi Bommer	(West Germany) Bayer Uerdingen	3
6	(Denmark) Bent Christensen	(Denmark) Lyngby BK	3
6	(Uruguay) Jorge Orosmán da Silva	(Spain) Atlético Madrid	3
6	(Sweden) Sven Dahlkvist	(Sweden) AIK	3
6	(West Germany) Friedhelm Funkel	(West Germany) Bayer Uerdingen	3
6	(West Germany) Wolfgang Funkel	(West Germany) Bayer Uerdingen	3
6	(Iceland) Lárus Guðmundsson	(West Germany) Bayer Uerdingen	3
6	(Czechoslovakia) Pavel Korejčík	(Czechoslovakia) Dukla Prague	3
6	(Austria) Peter Pacult	(Austria) Rapid Wien	3
6	(Czechoslovakia) Stanislav Pelc	(Czechoslovakia) Dukla Prague	3
6	(East Germany) Hans-Uwe Pilz	(East Germany) Dynamo Dresden	3
6	(West Germany) Wolfgang Schäfer	(West Germany) Bayer Uerdingen	3
6	(Spain) Quique Setién	(Spain) Atlético Madrid	3
6	(Czechoslovakia) Ladislav Vízek	(Czechoslovakia) Dukla Prague	3
6	(Soviet Union) Ivan Yaremchuk	(Soviet Union) Dynamo Kyiv	3
6	(Soviet Union) Vadym Yevtushenko	(Soviet Union) Dynamo Kyiv	3

== See also ==
- 1985–86 European Cup
- 1985–86 UEFA Cup
