= 1988 President's Cup International Football Tournament =

1988 President's Cup
Tournament details
- Host country: South Korea
- Dates: 16–28 June
- Teams: 16

Final positions
- Champions: Czechoslovakia XI (1st title)
- Runners-up: Soviet Union XI
- Third place: South Korea
- Fourth place: (Nigeria) Iwuanyanwu Nationale

Tournament statistics
- Matches played: 32
- Goals scored: 89 (2.78 per match)
- Top scorer(s): (Czechoslovakia) Milan Luhový (Mexico) Alberto Mariscal (South Korea) Choi Soon-ho (4 goals each)

The 1988 President's Cup International Football Tournament (Korean: 제17회 대통령배 국제축구대회) was the 17th competition of Korea Cup. This edition was held from 16 to 28 June 1988 to prepare the 1988 Summer Olympics, which was hosted in their country, and was the largest scale among all-time Korea Cups. Czechoslovakia XI won the tournament after defeating Soviet Union XI in the final.

== Group stage ==
=== Group A ===
Team	Pld	W	D	L	GF	GA	GD	Pts	Qualification
(Mexico) Atlas	3	2	1	0	5	2	+3	5	Qualification to quarter-finals
South Korea	3	2	0	1	10	3	+7	4	Qualification to quarter-finals
Zambia	3	1	0	2	2	7	–5	2	
(Italy) Serie C U21	3	0	1	2	3	8	–5	1	

16 June 1988
18:30 KST

South Korea	5–1	(Italy) Serie C U21
Yeo Bum-kyu 15'; Choi Soon-ho 37', 40'; Choi Sang-kook 56'; Lee Tae-ho 67'	Report	Bizzarri 55'

Seoul Olympic Stadium, Seoul

17 June 1988
18:00 KST

Atlas (Mexico)	2–0	Zambia
Mariscal 1', 51'	Report

Daejeon Hanbat Sports Complex, Daejeon

19 June 1988
16:00 KST

Atlas (Mexico)	1–1	(Italy) Serie C U21
Velasco 14'	Report	Pizzi 65'

Suwon Sports Complex, Suwon

19 June 1988
17:50 KST

South Korea	4–0	Zambia
Byun Byung-joo 3'; Choi Soon-ho 53'; Chung Hae-won 77', 86'	Report

Suwon Sports Complex, Suwon

21 June 1988
18:00 KST

Zambia	2–1	(Italy) Serie C U21
Chambeshi 69'; Peter Mwanza 70'	Report	Bidini 26'

Dongdaemun Stadium, Seoul

21 June 1988
19:50 KST

South Korea	1–2	(Mexico) Atlas
Choi Sang-kook 23'	Report	Pacheco 41'; Mariscal 85'

Dongdaemun Stadium, Seoul

=== Group B ===
Team	Pld	W	D	L	GF	GA	GD	Pts	Qualification
(Socialist Federal Republic of Yugoslavia) Velež Mostar	3	2	1	0	8	5	+3	5	Qualification to quarter-finals
Czechoslovakia XI	3	1	1	1	5	4	+1	3	Qualification to quarter-finals
Turkey Olympic	3	1	1	1	3	4	–1	3	
(Peru) Sporting Cristal	3	0	1	2	4	7	–3	1	

18 June 1988
18:00 KST

Czechoslovakia XI	2–0	Turkey Olympic
Grussmann 7'; Luhový 82'	Report

Daegu Civic Stadium, Daegu
Referee: Na Yoon-shik (South Korea)

18 June 1988
17:50 KST

Sporting Cristal (Peru)	2–4	(Socialist Federal Republic of Yugoslavia) Velež Mostar
Manassero 29'; Antón 51'	Report	Gudelj 25', 53'; Repak 57'; Barbarić 68'

Daegu Civic Stadium, Daegu

20 June 1988
18:00 KST

Czechoslovakia XI	1–1	(Peru) Sporting Cristal
Luhový 48' (pen.)	Report	Antón 76'

Busan Gudeok Stadium, Busan

20 June 1988
19:50 KST

Turkey Olympic	1–1	(Socialist Federal Republic of Yugoslavia) Velež Mostar
Gedikali 80'	Report	Repak 24'

Busan Gudeok Stadium, Busan
Referee: Park Kyung-hwa (South Korea)

22 June 1988
16:00 KST

Turkey Olympic	2–1	(Peru) Sporting Cristal
	Report

Masan Stadium, Masan
Referee: Sergei Khusainov (USSR)

22 June 1988
17:50 KST

Czechoslovakia XI	2–3	(Socialist Federal Republic of Yugoslavia) Velež Mostar
Luhový 54'; Drulák 84'	Report	Gudelj 28'; Hýravý 69' (o.g.); Jedvaj 81'

Masan Stadium, Masan

=== Group C ===
Team	Pld	W	D	L	GF	GA	GD	Pts	Qualification
Soviet Union XI	3	3	0	0	5	0	+5	6	Qualification to quarter-finals
(Nigeria) Iwuanyanwu Nationale	3	1	1	1	4	4	0	3	Qualification to quarter-finals
(England) Queens Park Rangers	3	0	2	1	2	5	–3	2	
United States	3	0	1	2	3	5	–2	1	

16 June 1988
20:20 KST

United States	0–1	Soviet Union XI
		Gorlukovich 18'

Seoul Olympic Stadium, Seoul

17 June 1988
19:50 KST

Iwuanyanwu Nationale (Nigeria)	1–1	(England) Queens Park Rangers
Obiku 85'		Pizanti 3'

Daejeon Hanbat Sports Complex, Daejeon

19 June 1988
18:00 KST

United States	2–3	(Nigeria) Iwuanyanwu Nationale
Trittschuh 24', 90+4'	Report	Igwilo 15', 47'; Ozogula 66'

Gwangju Mudeung Stadium, Gwangju

19 June 1988
19:50 KST

Soviet Union XI	3–0	(England) Queens Park Rangers
Ponomaryov 7' (pen.); Shmarov 24'; Janonis 53'	Report

Gwangju Mudeung Stadium, Gwangju

21 June 1988
16:00 KST

Soviet Union XI	1–0	(Nigeria) Iwuanyanwu Nationale
? 56'	Report

Gumi Civic Stadium, Gumi

21 June 1988
17:50 KST

United States	1–1	(England) Queens Park Rangers
Trittschuh 2'		Fereday 30'

Gumi Civic Stadium, Gumi

=== Group D ===
Team	Pld	W	D	L	GF	GA	GD	Pts	Qualification
Iraq	3	3	0	0	7	2	+5	6	Qualification to quarter-finals
Hungary XI	3	1	1	1	3	3	0	3	Qualification to quarter-finals
(Argentina) Gimnasia y Esgrima (LP)	3	1	1	1	3	4	–1	3	
South Korea B	3	0	0	3	2	6	–4	0	

18 June 1988
16:00 KST

Gimnasia y Esgrima (LP) (Argentina)	0–0	Hungary XI

Cheongju Sports Complex, Cheongju

18 June 1988
17:50 KST

South Korea B	0–2	Iraq
		Saeed 33', 84'

Cheongju Sports Complex, Cheongju

20 June 1988
16:00 KST

Iraq	3–1	(Argentina) Gimnasia y Esgrima (LP)
Allawi 44'; Qais 65'; Radhi 70'	Report	Carrió 73'

Anyang Sports Complex, Anyang

20 June 1988
17:50 KST

South Korea B	1–2	Hungary XI
Keller 7' (o.g.)	Report	Gyimesi 29'; Handel 40'

Anyang Sports Complex, Anyang

22 June 1988
16:00 KST

Iraq	2–1	Hungary XI
Oraibi 57'; Saeed 75'	Report	Fischer 41'

Gangneung Stadium, Gangneung

22 June 1988
17:50 KST

South Korea B	1–2	(Argentina) Gimnasia y Esgrima (LP)
Lim Jong-heon 55'	Report	Guendulain 88'; Sergio 89'

Gangneung Stadium, Gangneung

== Knockout stage ==
=== Bracket ===
Quarter-finals
24 June – Seoul
(Mexico) Atlas	2
Czechoslovakia XI (a.e.t.)	3
24 June – Seoul
(Socialist Federal Republic of Yugoslavia) Velež Mostar	0
South Korea	1
24 June – Seoul
Soviet Union XI (a.e.t.)	2
Hungary XI	0
24 June – Seoul
Iraq	1
(Nigeria) Iwuanyanwu Nationale	2

Semi-finals
26 June – Seoul
Czechoslovakia XI (p)	0 (4)
South Korea	0 (3)
26 June – Seoul
Soviet Union XI	1
(Nigeria) Iwuanyanwu Nationale	0

Final
28 June – Seoul
Czechoslovakia XI	2
Soviet Union XI	1
Third place play-off
28 June – Seoul
South Korea	3
(Nigeria) Iwuanyanwu Nationale	2

=== Quarter-finals ===
24 June 1988
18:00 KST

Atlas (Mexico)	2–3 (a.e.t.)	Czechoslovakia XI
Velasco 18'; Mariscal 38' (pen.)	Report	Luhový 34' (pen.); Korejčík 47', 96'

Dongdaemun Stadium, Seoul

24 June 1988
20:30 KST

Velež Mostar (Socialist Federal Republic of Yugoslavia)	0–1	South Korea
	Report	Choi Soon-ho 72'

Dongdaemun Stadium, Seoul

24 June 1988
18:00 KST

Soviet Union XI	2–0 (a.e.t.)	Hungary XI
Ponomaryov 104'; Narbekovas 110'

Busan Gudeok Stadium, Busan

24 June 1988
20:30 KST

Iraq	1–2	(Nigeria) Iwuanyanwu Nationale
Radhi 61'	Report	Ekpo 24'; Uzokwe 43'

Busan Gudeok Stadium, Busan

=== Semi-finals ===
26 June 1988
18:00 KST

Czechoslovakia XI	0–0 (a.e.t.)	South Korea
	Report
Penalties
Luhový (penalty scored); Korejčík (penalty scored); Grussmann (penalty scored); Fitzel (penalty scored); Pavlik (penalty missed)	4–3	(penalty scored) Yeo Bum-kyu; (penalty scored) Kim Sam-soo; (penalty scored) Byun Byung-joo; (penalty missed) Gu Sang-bum; (penalty missed) Chung Hae-won

Seoul Olympic Stadium, Seoul
Attendance: 40,000

26 June 1988
20:50 KST

Soviet Union XI	1–0	(Nigeria) Iwuanyanwu Nationale
Puchkov 24'	Report

Seoul Olympic Stadium, Seoul

=== Third place play-off ===
28 June 1988
18:00 KST

South Korea	3–2	(Nigeria) Iwuanyanwu Nationale
Lee Tae-ho 20', 64'; Kim Yong-se 34'	Report	Ekarika 87'; Ekpo 89'

Seoul Olympic Stadium, Seoul

=== Final ===
28 June 1988
19:50 KST

Czechoslovakia XI	2–1	Soviet Union XI
Malyukov 83' (o.g.); Moravčík 85'	Report	Narbekovas 14'

Seoul Olympic Stadium, Seoul

== Goalscorers ==
Scorers of seven goals among 89 goals are unknown.

4 goals

- (Czechoslovakia) Milan Luhový
- (Mexico) Alberto Mariscal
- (South Korea) Choi Soon-ho

3 goals

- (Socialist Federal Republic of Yugoslavia) Vladimir Gudelj
- (United States) Steve Trittschuh
- (Iraq) Hussein Saeed
- (South Korea) Lee Tae-ho

2 goals

- (South Korea) Choi Sang-kook
- (South Korea) Chung Hae-won
- (Peru) Julio César Antón
- (Socialist Federal Republic of Yugoslavia) Zijad Repak
- (Mexico) Luis Padilla Velasco
- (Czechoslovakia) Pavel Korejčík
- (Soviet Union) Igor Ponomaryov
- (Soviet Union) Arminas Narbekovas
- (Iraq) Ahmed Radhi
- (Nigeria) Friday Ekpo

1 goal

- (South Korea) Yeo Bum-kyu
- (South Korea) Byun Byung-joo
- (South Korea) Lim Jong-heon
- (South Korea) Kim Yong-se
- (Italy) Girolamo Bizzarri
- (Italy) Fausto Pizzi
- (Italy) Roberto Bidini
- (Mexico) Sergio Pacheco
- (Zambia) Beston Chambeshi
- (Zambia) Peter Mwanza
- (Czechoslovakia) Alois Grussmann
- (Czechoslovakia) Radek Drulák
- (Czechoslovakia) Ľubomír Moravčík
- (Peru) Francesco Manassero
- (Socialist Federal Republic of Yugoslavia) Ivica Barbarić
- (Socialist Federal Republic of Yugoslavia) Zdenko Jedvaj
- (Turkey) Gökhan Gedikali
- (Soviet Union) Sergei Gorlukovich
- (Soviet Union) Valeri Shmarov
- (Soviet Union) Arvydas Janonis
- (Soviet Union) Serhiy Puchkov
- (Nigeria) Michael Obiku
- (Nigeria) Samson Ozogula
- (Nigeria) Paul Uzokwe
- (Nigeria) Uwem Ekarika
- (Israel) David Pizanti
- (England) Wayne Fereday
- (Iraq) Karim Allawi
- (Iraq) Saad Qais
- (Iraq) Ghanim Oraibi
- (Argentina) Carlos Carrió
- (Argentina) Guillermo Guendulain
- (Hungary) László Gyimesi
- (Hungary) György Handel
- (Hungary) Pál Fischer

1 own goal

- (Czechoslovakia) Viliam Hýravý
- (Hungary) József Keller
- (Soviet Union) Oleg Malyukov

== See also ==
- Korea Cup
- South Korea national football team results
