= Clausura 2025 Liga MX final phase =

Tournament details
- Dates: 26 April – 25 May 2025
- Teams: 10

Tournament statistics
- Matches played: 17
- Goals scored: 37 (2.18 per match)
- Attendance: 473,594 (27,858 per match)

The Clausura 2025 Liga MX final phase was played between 26 April and 25 May 2025. A total of ten teams competed in the final phase to decide the champions of the Apertura 2024 Liga MX season.

For the fourth straight season, the number of clubs qualifying for the quarter-finals was six while the teams qualifying for the reclassification is four. The four clubs qualified for the reclassification competed in the "play-in" round, a tournament modeled after the NBA play-in tournament.

Toluca defeated América 2–0 on aggregate to win their eleventh title. As winners, Toluca faced América (Apertura 2024 champion) at the 2025 Campeón de Campeones.

== Qualified teams ==
The following teams qualified for the championship stage.

In the following tables, the number of appearances, last appearance, and previous best result count only those in the short tournament era starting from Invierno 1996 (not counting those in the long tournament era from 1943–44 to 1995–96).

Qualified directly to quarter-finals (6 teams)
Seed	Team	Points (GD)	Date of qualification	Appearance	Last appearance	Previous best (last)	Ref.
1	Toluca	36	5 April 2025 (PLAY); 12 April 2025 (QF)	40th	Apertura 2024	Champions (Bic. 2010)	
2	América	34	29 March 2025 (PLAY); 19 April 2025 (QF)	40th	Apertura 2024	Champions (Ap. 2024)	
3	Cruz Azul	33 (+10)	5 April 2025 (PLAY); 16 April 2025 (QF)	37th	Apertura 2024	Champions (Gua. 2021)	
4	UANL	33 (+10)	5 April 2025 (PLAY); 19 April 2025 (QF)	35th	Apertura 2024	Champions (Cl. 2023)	
5	Necaxa	31	5 April 2025 (PLAY); 20 April 2025 (QF)	22nd	Clausura 2024	Champions (Inv. 1998)	
6	León	30	5 April 2025 (PLAY); 20 April 2025 (QF)	18th	Apertura 2023	Champions (Gua. 2020)	

Qualified to play-in round (4 teams)
Seed	Team	Points (GD)	Date of qualification	Appearance	Last appearance	Previous best (last)	Ref
7	Monterrey	28 (+9)	16 April 2025	31st	Apertura 2024	Champions (Ap. 2019)	
8	Pachuca	28 (+6)	11 April 2025	41th	Clausura 2024	Champions (Ap. 2022)	
9	Juárez	24	15 April 2025	2nd	Apertura 2022	Reclassification (Ap. 2022)	
10	UNAM	21	19 April 2025	28th	Apertura 2024	Champions (Cl. 2011)	

== Play-in round ==
=== Format ===
The 9th place team hosts the 10th place team in an elimination game. The 7th hosts the 8th place team in the double-chance game, with the winner advancing as the 7-seed. The loser of this game then hosts the winner of the elimination game between the 9th and 10th place teams to determine the 8-seed.

=== Bracket ===
Play-in games
Serie A
7	Monterrey	1
8	Pachuca	2
Serie B
9	Juárez	1 (1)
10	UNAM	1 (2)

No. 8 seed game
7	Monterrey	2
10	UNAM	0

Final seeds
8	Pachuca	No. 7 seed
7	Monterrey	No. 8 seed

=== Play-in matches ===
Team 1	Score	Team 2
Monterrey	1–2	Pachuca
Juárez	1–1 (1–2 p)	UNAM

==== Serie A ====
27 April 2025
19:30 CST (UTC−6)

Monterrey	1–2	Pachuca
Berterame 51'	Report	Bauermann 82'; Rondón 87'

Estadio BBVA, Guadalupe
Attendance: 48,353
Referee: Luis Enrique Santander (Guanajuato)

==== Serie B ====
27 April 2025
16:00 MDT (UTC−7)

Juárez	1–1	UNAM
Madson 20'	Report	Martínez 16'
Penalties
Estupiñán (penalty scored); Zaldívar (penalty missed); Hurtado (penalty missed); Rodríguez (penalty missed); Valoyes (penalty missed)	1–2	(penalty missed) Carrasquilla; (penalty scored) Nathan; (penalty missed) Funes Mori; (penalty missed) Caicedo; (penalty scored) Ergas

Estadio Olímpico Benito Juárez, Ciudad Juárez
Attendance: 11,074
Referee: Víctor Alfonso Cáceres (Chiapas)

==== No. 8 seed match ====
Team 1	Score	Team 2
Monterrey	2–0	UNAM

4 May 2025
19:30 CST (UTC−6)

Monterrey	2–0	UNAM
Berterame 58'; Deossa 89'	Report

Estadio BBVA, Guadalupe
Attendance: 47,715
Referee: Adonai Escobedo (Aguascalientes)

== Bracket ==
Quarter-finals
1	Toluca (s)	2	2	4
8	Monterrey	3	1	4
4	UANL (s)	0	2	2
5	Necaxa	0	2	2
2	América	0	2	2
7	Pachuca	0	0	0
3	Cruz Azul	3	2	5
6	León	2	1	3

Semi-finals
1	Toluca	1	3	4
4	UANL	1	0	1
2	América (s)	0	2	2
3	Cruz Azul	1	1	2

Finals
1	Toluca	0	2	2
2	América	0	0	0

== Quarter-finals ==
=== Summary ===
The first legs will be played on 7–8 May 2025, and the second legs will be played on 10–11 May 2025.

Team 1	Agg.	Team 2	1st leg	2nd leg
Monterrey	4–4 (s)	Toluca	3–2	1–2
Pachuca	0–2	América	0–0	0–2
León	3–5	Cruz Azul	2–3	1–2
Necaxa	2–2 (s)	UANL	0–0	2–2

=== Matches ===
7 May 2025
19:00 CST (UTC−6)

Monterrey	3–2	Toluca
Deossa 44'; Canales 50'; Berterame 69'	Report	Guzmán 16' (o.g.); Luan 82'

Estadio BBVA, Guadalupe
Attendance: 38,647
Referee: Guillermo Pacheco Larios (Sonora)
10 May 2025
19:00 CST (UTC−6)

Toluca	2–1	Monterrey
Vega 30'; Paulinho 68'	Report	de la Rosa 48'

Estadio Nemesio Díez, Toluca
Attendance: 27,273
Referee: Fernando Hernández Gómez (Mexico City)

4–4 on aggregate. Toluca advanced due to being the higher seeded club.

7 May 2025
21:10 CST (UTC−6)

Pachuca	0–0	América
	Report

Estadio Hidalgo, Pachuca
Attendance: 13,925
Referee: Jesus Rafael Lopez (Sinaloa)
10 May 2025
21:10 CST (UTC−6)

América	2–0	Pachuca
Zendejas 16', 28'	Report

Estadio Ciudad de los Deportes, Mexico City
Attendance: 25,417
Referee: Daniel Quintero Huitrón (Jalisco)

América won 2–0 on aggregate.

8 May 2025
21:10 CST (UTC−6)

León	2–3	Cruz Azul
Santos 29'; Moreno 46'	Report	Rivero 14'; Montaño 19', 41'

Estadio León, León
Attendance: 13,667
Referee: César Arturo Ramos (Sinaloa)
11 May 2025
19:00 CST (UTC−6)

Cruz Azul	2–1	León
Rivero 33'; Echeverría 66' (o.g.)	Report	Cádiz 39'

Estadio Olímpico Universitario, Mexico City
Attendance: 20,577
Referee: Víctor Alfonso Cáceres (Chiapas)

Cruz Azul won 5–3 on aggregate.

8 May 2025
19:00 CST (UTC−6)

Necaxa	0–0	UANL
	Report

Estadio Victoria, Aguascalientes
Attendance: 20,641
Referee: Oscar Mejía García (Mexico City)
11 May 2025
21:10 CST (UTC−6)

UANL	2–2	Necaxa
Brunetta 51'; Mayorga 90+7' (o.g.)	Report	Palavecino 63'; Badaloni 86'

Estadio Universitario, San Nicolás de los Garza
Attendance: 39,268
Referee: Marco Antonio Ortiz (Durango)

2–2 on aggregate. UANL advanced due to being the higher seeded club.

== Semi-finals ==
=== Summary ===
The first legs will be played on 14–15 May 2025, and the second legs will be played on 17–18 May 2025.

Team 1	Agg.	Team 2	1st leg	2nd leg
UANL	1–4	Toluca	1–1	0–3
Cruz Azul	2–2 (s)	América	1–0	1–2

=== Matches ===
14 May 2025
21:00 CST (UTC−6)

UANL	1–1	Toluca
Ibáñez 19'	Report	Paulinho 45+1'

Estadio Universitario, San Nicolás de los Garza
Attendance: 41,615
Referee: Adonai Escobedo (Aguascalientes)
17 May 2025
19:00 CST (UTC−6)

Toluca	3–0	UANL
Vega 18' (pen.), 82'; I. López 79'	Report

Estadio Nemesio Díez, Toluca
Attendance: 27,273
Referee: Fernando Hernández Gómez (Mexico City)

Toluca won 4–1 on aggregate.

15 May 2025
20:00 CST (UTC−6)

Cruz Azul	1–0	América
Rivero 59'	Report

Estadio Olímpico Universitario, Mexico City
Attendance: 34,951
Referee: Luis Enrique Santander (Guanajuato)
18 May 2025
19:15 CST (UTC−6)

América	2–1	Cruz Azul
Martín 66' (pen.); Borja 79'	Report	Faravelli 57'

Estadio Ciudad de los Deportes, Mexico City
Attendance: 30,872
Referee: Víctor Alfonso Cáceres (Chiapas)

2–2 on aggregate. América advanced due to being the higher seeded club.

== Finals ==
=== Summary ===
The first leg will be played on 22 May 2025, and the second leg will be played on 25 May 2025.

Team 1	Agg.	Team 2	1st leg	2nd leg
América	0–2	Toluca	0–0	0–2

=== First leg ===
22 May 2025
20:00 CST (UTC−6)

América	0–0	Toluca
	Report

Estadio Ciudad de los Deportes, Mexico City
Attendance: 30,406
Referee: Daniel Quintero Huitrón (Jalisco)

==== Details ====
América	Toluca

GK	1	(Mexico) Luis Malagón
DF	5	(Mexico) Kevin Álvarez		(substituted off) 82'
DF	3	(Mexico) Israel Reyes
DF	4	(Uruguay) Sebastián Cáceres	(yellow card) 29'
DF	26	(Colombia) Cristian Borja
MF	28	(Mexico) Érick Sánchez		(substituted off) 83'
MF	6	(Mexico) Jonathan dos Santos		(substituted off) 72'
MF	8	(Spain) Álvaro Fidalgo
MF	17	(United States) Alejandro Zendejas
MF	11	(Chile) Víctor Dávila	(yellow card) 48'	(substituted off) 61'
FW	21	(Mexico) Henry Martín (c)		(substituted off) 72'
Substitutions:
GK	30	(Mexico) Rodolfo Cota
DF	14	(Mexico) Néstor Araujo
DF	18	(Mexico) Cristian Calderón
DF	29	(Mexico) Ramón Juárez
DF	32	(Mexico) Miguel Vázquez
MF	10	(Chile) Diego Valdés		(substituted on) 61'
MF	13	(Mexico) Alan Cervantes		(substituted on) 72'
MF	34	(Mexico) Dagoberto Espinoza
FW	24	(Netherlands) Javairô Dilrosun		(substituted on) 83'
FW	27	(Uruguay) Rodrigo Aguirre		(substituted on) 72'
Manager:
(Brazil) André Jardine

GK	22	(Mexico) Luis García
DF	2	(Mexico) Diego Barbosa
DF	4	(Uruguay) Bruno Méndez		(substituted off) 88'
DF	13	(Brazil) Luan	(yellow card) 11'
DF	6	(Uruguay) Federico Pereira	(yellow card) 55'
DF	20	(Mexico) Jesús Gallardo
MF	5	(Argentina) Franco Romero
MF	10	(Mexico) Jesús Angulo		(substituted off) 79'
MF	14	(Mexico) Marcel Ruiz
FW	31	(Paraguay) Robert Morales
FW	9	(Mexico) Alexis Vega (c)		(substituted off) 86'
Substitutions:
GK	181	(Mexico) Ronaldo Beltrán
DF	3	(Mexico) Antonio Briseño		(substituted on) 88'
DF	17	(Mexico) Brian García
MF	25	(Mexico) Everardo López
MF	7	(Mexico) Juan Pablo Domínguez		(substituted on) 79'
MF	16	(Mexico) Héctor Herrera
MF	198	(Mexico) Víctor Arteaga
MF	11	(Brazil) Helinho
FW	12	(Mexico) Isaías Violante		(substituted on) 86'
FW	187	(Mexico) Oswaldo Virgen
Manager:
(Argentina) Antonio Mohamed

Assistant referees:
Marco Antonio Bisguerra (Guanajuato)
Jorge Antonio Sánchez (Estado de México)
Fourth official:
Adonai Escobedo (Aguascalientes)
Video assistant referee:
Erick Yair Miranda (Guanajuato)
Assistant video assistant referee:
Jorge Abraham Camacho (Jalisco)

==== Statistics ====
Statistic	América	Toluca
Goals scored	0	0
Total shots	7	8
Shots on target	1	3
Saves	3	1
Ball possession	60%	40%
Corner kicks	2	2
Fouls committed	10	19
Offsides	2	1
Yellow cards	2	2
Red cards	0	0

=== Second leg ===
25 May 2025
19:00 CST (UTC−6)

Toluca	2–0	América
Luan 65'; Vega 82' (pen.)	Report

Estadio Nemesio Díez, Toluca
Attendance: 27,273
Referee: César Arturo Ramos (Sinaloa)

Toluca won 2–0 on aggregate.

==== Details ====
Toluca	América

GK	22	(Mexico) Luis García	(yellow card) 90'
DF	2	(Mexico) Diego Barbosa
DF	4	(Uruguay) Bruno Méndez
DF	13	(Brazil) Luan
DF	6	(Uruguay) Federico Pereira
DF	20	(Mexico) Jesús Gallardo
MF	5	(Argentina) Franco Romero
MF	10	(Mexico) Jesús Angulo		(substituted off) 76'
MF	14	(Mexico) Marcel Ruiz
FW	26	(Portugal) Paulinho		(substituted off) 72'
FW	9	(Mexico) Alexis Vega (c)	(yellow card) 90+3'	(substituted off) 90+4'
Substitutions:
GK	181	(Mexico) Ronaldo Beltrán
DF	3	(Mexico) Antonio Briseño
DF	17	(Mexico) Brian García
DF	25	(Mexico) Everardo López
MF	7	(Mexico) Juan Pablo Domínguez
MF	16	(Mexico) Héctor Herrera		(substituted on) 76'
MF	198	(Mexico) Víctor Arteaga
FW	11	(Brazil) Helinho
FW	12	(Mexico) Isaías Violante		(substituted on) 90+4'
FW	31	(Paraguay) Robert Morales		(substituted on) 72'
Manager:
(Argentina) Antonio Mohamed

GK	1	(Mexico) Luis Malagón
DF	5	(Mexico) Kevin Álvarez		(substituted off) 83'
DF	3	(Mexico) Israel Reyes
DF	29	(Mexico) Ramón Juárez		(substituted off) 72'
DF	4	(Uruguay) Sebastián Cáceres	(yellow card) 78'
DF	26	(Colombia) Cristian Borja		(substituted off) 83'
MF	28	(Mexico) Érick Sánchez
MF	6	(Mexico) Jonathan dos Santos		(substituted off) 72'
MF	8	(Spain) Álvaro Fidalgo
MF	17	(United States) Alejandro Zendejas
FW	21	(Mexico) Henry Martín (c)		(substituted off) 49'
Substitutions:
GK	30	(Mexico) Rodolfo Cota
DF	14	(Mexico) Néstor Araujo
DF	18	(Mexico) Cristian Calderón
MF	10	(Chile) Diego Valdés		(substituted on) 72'
MF	13	(Mexico) Alan Cervantes
MF	34	(Mexico) Dagoberto Espinoza
FW	7	(Uruguay) Brian Rodríguez		(substituted on) 83'
FW	11	(Chile) Víctor Dávila		(substituted on) 72'
FW	24	(Netherlands) Javairô Dilrosun		(substituted on) 83'
FW	27	(Uruguay) Rodrigo Aguirre		(substituted on) 49'
Manager:
(Brazil) André Jardine

Assistant referees:
Alberto Morín Méndez (Chihuahua)
Karen Janett Díaz (Aguascalientes)
Fourth official:
Víctor Alfonso Cáceres (Chiapas)
Video assistant referee:
Guillermo Pacheco Larios (Sonora)
Assistant video assistant referee:
Diana Stephanía Pérez (Guanajuato)

==== Statistics ====
Statistic	Toluca	América
Goals scored	2	0
Total shots	15	4
Shots on target	3	0
Saves	0	1
Ball possession	37%	63%
Corner kicks	2	2
Fouls committed	13	10
Offsides	2	1
Yellow cards	2	1
Red cards	0	0

== Statistics ==
=== Goalscorers ===
There were 40 goals scored in 17 matches, for an average of 2.35 goals per match.

4 goals

- (Mexico) Alexis Vega (Toluca)

3 goals

- (Mexico) Germán Berterame (Monterrey)
- (Uruguay) Ignacio Rivero (Cruz Azul)

2 goals

- (Colombia) Nelson Deossa (Monterrey)
- (Portugal) Paulinho (Toluca)
- (Brazil) Luan Garcia (Toluca)
- (Mexico) Andrés Montaño (Cruz Azul)
- (United States) Alejandro Zendejas (América)

1 goal

- (Argentina) Tomás Badaloni (Necaxa)
- (Brazil) Eduardo Bauermann (Pachuca)
- (Colombia) Cristian Borja (América)
- (Argentina) Juan Brunetta (UANL)
- (Venezuela) Jhonder Cádiz (León)
- (Spain) Sergio Canales (Monterrey)
- (Brazil) Madson (Juárez)
- (Mexico) Roberto de la Rosa (Monterrey)
- (Argentina) Lorenzo Faravelli (Cruz Azul)
- (Argentina) Nicolás Ibáñez (UANL)
- (Mexico) Iván López (Toluca)
- (United States) Henry Martín (América)
- (Mexico) Guillermo Martínez (UNAM)
- (Mexico) Iván Moreno (León)
- (Argentina) Agustín Palavecino (Necaxa)
- (Venezuela) Salomón Rondón (Pachuca)
- (Mexico) Sebastián Santos (León)

1 own goal

- (Chile) Rodrigo Echeverría (against Cruz Azul)
- (Mexico) Víctor Guzmán (against Toluca)
- (Mexico) Alejandro Mayorga (against UANL)

=== Assists ===
3 assists

- (Mexico) Marcel Ruiz (Toluca)
- (Mexico) Alexis Vega (Toluca)

2 assists

- (Colombia) Stefan Medina (Monterrey)
- (Argentina) Carlos Rotondi (Cruz Azul)

1 assist

- (Mexico) Kevin Álvarez (América)
- (Mexico) Germán Berterame (Monterrey)
- (Mexico) Alfonso Blanco (León)
- (Mexico) Jesús Corona (Monterrey)
- (Mexico) Iker Fimbres (Monterrey)
- (Mexico) Ozziel Herrera (UANL)
- (Brazil) John Kennedy (Pachuca)
- (Mexico) Diego Lainez (UANL)
- (Mexico) Emilio Lara (Necaxa)
- (Colombia) Stiven Mendoza (León)
- (Argentina) Lucas Ocampos (Monterrey)
- (Argentina) José Paradela (Necaxa)
- (Mexico) Carlos Rodríguez (Cruz Azul)
- (Panama) José Luis Rodríguez (Juárez)
- (Mexico) Jorge Sánchez (Cruz Azul)
- (Mexico) Ángel Sepúlveda (Cruz Azul)
- (Mexico) Santiago Trigos (UNAM)
