= 1978–79 Nemzeti Bajnokság I =

Nemzeti Bajnokság I
- Season: 1978–79

Final standings of the 1978–79 Hungarian League season.

== Final standings ==
Pos	Team	Pld	W	D	L	GF	GA	GD	Pts	Qualification or relegation
1	Újpesti Dózsa (C)	34	21	10	3	84	38	+46	52	Qualification for European Cup first round
2	Ferencváros	34	18	11	5	75	44	+31	47	Qualification for UEFA Cup first round
3	Diósgyőr	34	19	6	9	60	37	+23	44	Qualification for UEFA Cup first round
4	Vasas	34	16	10	8	62	49	+13	42	
5	Budapest Honvéd	34	16	9	9	57	39	+18	41	
6	Rába ETO Győr	34	12	11	11	40	33	+7	35	Qualification for Cup Winners' Cup first round
7	Tatabányai Bányász	34	12	11	11	50	47	+3	35	
8	Pécsi MSC	34	10	15	9	38	42	−4	35	
9	Videoton	34	12	10	12	46	49	−3	34	
10	Zalaegerszeg	34	10	12	12	46	46	0	32	
11	Dunaújvárosi Kohász	34	10	12	12	50	54	−4	32	
12	Békéscsabai Előre	34	11	9	14	49	52	−3	31	
13	Salgótarján	34	9	13	12	43	50	−7	31	
14	MTK-VM	34	11	8	15	42	50	−8	30	
15	Székesfehérvári MÁV Előre	34	10	9	15	31	54	−23	29	
16	Csepel (R)	34	5	15	14	35	48	−13	25	Relegation to Nemzeti Bajnokság II
17	Haladás (R)	34	9	5	20	40	74	−34	23	Relegation to Nemzeti Bajnokság II
18	Vasas Izzó (R)	34	4	6	24	35	77	−42	14	Relegation to Nemzeti Bajnokság II

Source: rsssf.com
(C) Champions; (R) Relegated

== Results ==
Home \ Away	BÉK	CSE	DIÓ	DUN	FTC	HAL	HON	MTK	PÉC	GYŐ	SAL	SME	TAT	ÚJP	VAS	VIZ	VID	ZTE
Békéscsabai Előre		1–1	5–0	2–0	2–2	3–2	0–2	1–0	0–0	0–1	2–2	2–1	1–1	2–2	1–0	6–0	3–1	3–1
Csepel	1–2		0–2	0–0	1–2	0–1	1–1	0–2	1–1	1–1	1–1	5–0	0–0	2–2	2–1	2–1	1–1	0–0
Diósgyőr	5–0	2–0		2–0	1–0	6–1	3–0	3–2	2–0	2–0	1–0	1–0	3–0	0–0	3–0	3–0	0–0	4–0
Dunaújvárosi Kohász	3–1	1–1	1–2		2–2	2–4	2–2	3–0	1–1	2–0	4–2	2–0	1–0	1–1	5–1	3–1	2–3	2–2
Ferencváros	1–1	3–3	1–1	3–1		2–0	2–0	3–2	4–1	2–1	1–0	5–0	4–1	1–1	3–0	2–0	3–2	4–0
Haladás	1–0	0–5	1–5	0–1	1–1		1–1	2–1	1–1	2–0	1–2	5–3	0–1	0–1	1–2	1–0	3–2	0–1
Budapest Honvéd	1–1	5–1	5–0	1–0	5–2	3–0		2–2	1–0	2–2	3–1	1–0	2–0	4–1	1–2	4–1	1–0	2–0
MTK-VM	3–2	0–1	1–0	3–0	1–1	3–2	0–3		1–0	1–0	2–1	1–1	0–0	1–2	2–3	2–2	2–1	0–2
Pécsi MSC	2–1	3–0	0–0	0–0	4–4	1–0	1–1	1–0		0–0	1–0	1–1	2–1	2–2	2–2	3–1	2–1	2–0
Rába ETO Győr	2–0	1–1	2–1	1–0	0–2	1–0	1–1	3–1	4–0		0–1	2–0	1–2	0–2	0–0	1–1	5–0	3–1
Salgótarján	1–1	2–1	1–1	1–0	1–1	1–0	2–1	1–1	1–1	2–2		3–0	3–3	0–1	1–1	5–1	1–1	1–0
Székesfehérvári MÁV Előre	1–0	1–0	1–1	3–1	1–0	1–1	0–0	1–1	1–0	0–0	0–0		2–0	1–0	1–4	2–1	0–3	0–0
Tatabányai Bányász	1–0	3–0	5–2	1–1	1–5	5–0	3–0	1–0	2–0	1–1	1–1	4–1		1–2	0–2	4–2	3–1	1–1
Újpesti Dózsa	3–1	4–3	5–0	7–1	2–2	5–1	4–0	2–0	2–0	3–2	4–1	3–0	5–1		1–1	3–0	3–1	3–1
Vasas	2–1	0–0	3–1	2–2	5–3	3–0	2–1	1–3	3–1	0–0	3–1	4–2	2–2	4–2		4–1	1–2	2–0
Vasas Izzó	1–2	1–0	1–3	3–4	1–2	4–6	0–1	1–2	1–1	0–2	4–2	0–2	1–0	0–0	0–0		3–0	0–0
Videoton	3–0	0–0	1–0	1–1	2–0	1–1	1–0	3–1	1–1	2–0	2–1	0–3	1–1	1–3	3–1	3–1		0–0
Zalaegerszeg	5–2	3–0	1–0	1–1	0–2	6–1	3–0	1–1	2–3	0–1	4–0	3–1	0–0	3–3	1–1	2–1	2–2	

Source: rsssf.com
Legend: Blue = home team win; Yellow = draw; Red = away team win.

== Statistical leaders ==
=== Top goalscorers ===
Rank	Scorer	Club	Goals
1	(Hungary) László Fazekas	Újpesti Dózsa	31
2	(Hungary) László Fekete	Újpesti Dózsa	26
3	(Hungary) Tibor Nyilasi	Ferencvárosi TC	21
4	(Hungary) István Weimper	Budapest Honvéd	17
5	(Hungary) István Gass	Vasas SC	14
5	(Hungary) László Kuti	Dunaújvárosi SE	14
5	(Hungary) Béla Várady	Vasas SC	14
8	(Hungary) Antal Bíró	Salgótarjáni BTC	13
8	(Hungary) András Törőcsik	Újpesti Dózsa	13
10	(Hungary) Győző Burcsa	Videoton SC	12
10	(Hungary) László Kiss	Vasas SC	12
10	(Hungary) István Schmidt	Tatabányai SC	12

== Attendances ==
No.	Club	Average
1	Ferencváros	16,412
2	Békéscsaba	10,765
3	Diósgyör	9,412
4	Újpest	8,235
5	Honvéd	7,835
6	MTK	7,265
7	Fehérvár	6,706
8	Sálgotarján	6,353
9	Zalaegerszeg	6,088
10	Pécs	6,059
11	Vasas	6,000
12	Szombathelyi Haladás	5,500
13	Dunaújváros	4,824
14	Tatabánya Bányász	4,765
15	ETO	4,529
16	Székesfehérvár	3,588
17	Vasas Izzó	2,329
18	Csepel	1,941
