= Jedvaj =

Jedvaj is a Croatian surname. Notable people with the surname include:

- Tin Jedvaj (born 1995), Croatian footballer, son of Zdenko;
- Zdenko Jedvaj (born 1966), retired Croatian footballer, father of Tin.
