= Bent Christensen =

Bent Christensen may refer to:

- Bent Christensen (director), Danish film director
- Bent Christensen (footballer born 1963), Danish footballer who played four games for the Danish national team
- Bent Christensen Arensøe, formerly known as Bent René Christensen, (born 1967), Danish football player
- Bent Christensen (zoologist), Danish zoologist
