= Manassero =

Manassero is an Italian surname. Notable people with the surname include:

- Francesco Manassero (born 1964), Peruvian footballer
- Matteo Manassero (born 1993), Italian golfer
- Patrizia Manassero (born 1960), Italian politician
