= Luis Padilla =

Luis Padilla may refer to:

- Luis Padilla Nervo (1894–1985), Mexican politician and diplomat
- Luis Padilla Guevara (born 1952), Ecuadoran songwriter, competed in the OTI Festival 1977
- Luis Padilla (footballer, born 1961), Mexican football manager and former midfielder
- Luis Padilla (footballer, born 1985), Mexican football centre-back
