= Salim Hernández =

Mexican footballer (born 1998)

Personal information
- Full name: Jorge Salim Hernández Soriano
- Date of birth: 7 December 1998 (age 27)
- Place of birth: Guadalajara, Jalisco, Mexico
- Height: 1.91 m (6 ft 3 in)
- Position: Goalkeeper

Team information
- Current team: Tijuana
- Number: 29

Youth career
- 2015–2020: UdeG

Senior career*
Years	Team	Apps	(Gls)
2020–2024	UdeG	99	(0)
2024–2025	Querétaro	10	(0)
2025–	Tijuana	0	(0)
- * Club domestic league appearances and goals as of 22 November 2026

Jorge Salim Hernández Soriano (born 7 December 1998) is a Mexican professional footballer who plays as a goalkeeper for Liga MX side Tijuana.

== Career ==
In 2020, Hernández started his career in UdeG. In 2024, he was transferred to Querétaro. In 2025, he joined to Tijuana.

== Career statistics ==
=== Club ===
As of 22 November 2026

Appearances and goals by club, season and competition
Club	Season	League			Cup		Continental		Other		Total	
Club	Season	Division	Apps	Goals	Apps	Goals	Apps	Goals	Apps	Goals	Apps	Goals
UdeG	2018–19	Ascenso MX	—		1	0	—		—		1	0
UdeG	2019–20	Ascenso MX	—		1	0	—		—		1	0
UdeG	2020–21	Liga de Expansión MX	30	0	—		—		—		30	0
UdeG	2021–22	Liga de Expansión MX	12	0	—		—		—		12	0
UdeG	2022–23	Liga de Expansión MX	19	0	—		—		—		19	0
UdeG	2023–24	Liga de Expansión MX	38	0	—		—		—		38	0
UdeG	Total		99	0	2	0	—		—		101	0
Querétaro	2024–25	Liga MX	10	0	—		—		—		10	0
Tijuana	2025–26	Liga MX	—		—		—		1 (Note: Appearances in Leagues Cup)	0	1	0
Tijuana	2026–27	Liga MX	—		—		—		1	0	1	0
Tijuana	Total		—		—		—		2	0	2	0
Career total			109	0	2	0	0	0	2	0	113	0
