= Sebastián Santos =

Mexican footballer (born 2003)

Personal information
- Full name: Sebastián Santos Rosales
- Date of birth: 21 January 2003 (age 23)
- Place of birth: León, Guanajuato, Mexico
- Height: 1.78 m (5 ft 10 in)
- Position: Midfielder

Team information
- Current team: Pachuca
- Number: 12

Youth career
- 2016–2021: Pachuca
- 2021–2023: León

Senior career*
Years	Team	Apps	(Gls)
2023–	León	50	(1)
2026	→ Mazatlán (loan)	13	(0)
2026–	→ Pachuca (loan)	8	(0)
- * Club domestic league appearances and goals as of 21 November 2026

Sebastián Santos Rosales (born 17 August 2001) is a Mexican professional footballer who plays as a midfielder for Liga MX side Pachuca, on loan from León.

== Career ==
In 2023, Santos started his career in León. In 2026, he was loaned to Mazatlán.

== Career statistics ==
=== Club ===
As of match played on 21 November 2026

Appearances and goals by club, season and competition
Club	Season	League			Cup		Continental		Global		Other		Total	
Club	Season	Division	Apps	Goals	Apps	Goals	Apps	Goals	Apps	Goals	Apps	Goals	Apps	Goals
León	2022–23	Liga MX	1	0	—		1 (Note: Appearances in CONCACAF Champions Cup)	0	—		—		2	0
León	2023–24	Liga MX	14	0	—		—		1 (Note: Appearance in FIFA Club World Cup)	0	—		15	0
León	2024–25	Liga MX	22	1	—		—		—		—		22	1
León	2025–26	Liga MX	12	0	—		—		—		2 (Note: Appearances in Leagues Cup)	0	14	0
León	2026–27	Liga MX	1	0	—		—		—		3	0	4	0
León	Total		50	1	0	0	1	0	1	0	5	0	57	1
Mazatlán (loan)	2025–26	Liga MX	13	0	—		—		—		—		13	0
Pachuca (loan)	2026–27	Liga MX	8	0	—		—		—		—		8	0
Career total			71	1	0	0	1	0	1	0	5	0	78	1
