= Eduardo Águila =

Mexican footballer (born 2002)

Personal information
- Full name: Eduardo Águila Castro
- Date of birth: 17 May 2002 (age 24)
- Place of birth: Ocotlán, Jalisco, Mexico
- Height: 1.80 m (5 ft 11 in)
- Position: Defender

Team information
- Current team: Atlético San Luis
- Number: 31

Youth career
- 2019: La Piedad
- 2019–2023: Atlético San Luis

Senior career*
Years	Team	Apps	(Gls)
2018	Queseros de San José	11	(1)
2023–	Atlético San Luis	96	(3)

International career^{‡}
2023–2024	Mexico U23	2	(0)
2026–	Mexico	2	(0)
- * Club domestic league appearances and goals as of 20 November 2026 ‡ National team caps and goals as of 22 May 2026

Eduardo Águila Castro (born 17 May 2002) is a Mexican professional footballer who plays as a defender for Liga MX club Atlético San Luis and the Mexico national team.

== Early life ==
Águila was born on 17 May 2002. Born in Ocotlán, Mexico, he is a native of Ocotlán, Mexico.

== Club career ==
Águila started his career with Queseros de San José, where he made eleven league appearances and scored one goal. In 2019, he joined the youth academy of La Piedad.

The same year, he joined the youth academy of Atlético San Luis and was promoted to the club's senior team in 2023. During the 2024–25 season, he helped them reach the semi-finals of the Apertura 2024 Liga MX final phase.

== Career statistics ==
=== Club ===
As of match played on 20 November 2026

Appearances and goals by club, season and competition
Club	Season	League			Cup		Continental		Intercontinental		Other		Total	
Club	Season	Division	Apps	Goals	Apps	Goals	Apps	Goals	Apps	Goals	Apps	Goals	Apps	Goals
Atlético San Luis	2022–23	Liga MX	5	0	—		—		—		—		5	0
Atlético San Luis	2023–24	Liga MX	10	0	—		—		—		—		10	0
Atlético San Luis	2024–25	Liga MX	35	0	—		—		—		2 (Note: Appearances in Leagues Cup)	0	37	0
Atlético San Luis	2025–26	Liga MX	29	2	—		—		—		2	0	31	2
Atlético San Luis	2026–27	Liga MX	17	1	—		—		—		3	0	20	1
Career total			96	3	0	0	0	0	0	0	7	0	103	3

=== International ===
As of match played on 22 May 2026

Appearances and goals by national team and year
National team	Year	Apps	Goals
Mexico	2026	2	0
Total		2	0
