= 2024–25 Liga MX season =

78th professional season of the top-flight football league in Mexico

Liga MX
- Season: 2024–25
- Champions: Apertura: América (16th title); Clausura: Toluca (11th title)
- Champions Cup: Toluca; América; Monterrey; Cruz Azul; Tigres UANL; Pumas UNAM
- Matches: 306; Apertura: 153; Clausura: 153
- Goals: 840 (2.75 per match); Apertura: 403 (2.63 per match); Clausura: 437 (2.86 per match)
- Top goalscorer: Apertura: Paulinho (13 goals); Clausura: Uroš Đurđević; Paulinho; Raúl Zúñiga (12 goals each)
- Biggest home win: Apertura: Guadalajara 5–0 Juárez (31 August 2024); Toluca 5–0 Puebla (22 October 2024); Clausura: Toluca 5–0 Querétaro (26 February 2025); América 5–0 Mazatlán (19 April 2025)
- Biggest away win: Apertura: Mazatlán 0–5 América (1 November 2024); Clausura: Juárez 0–4 Toluca (22 February 2025); Santos Laguna 0–4 Tijuana (20 April 2025)
- Highest scoring: Apertura: Pachuca 6–2 Necaxa (2 November 2024); Clausura: Necaxa 3–5 Pachuca (11 April 2025)
- Longest winning run: Apertura: 7 matches Cruz Azul; Clausura: 6 matches Toluca
- Longest unbeaten run: Apertura: 9 matches Cruz Azul; Clausura: 10 matches León; Cruz Azul
- Longest winless run: Apertura: 8 matches Querétaro; Clausura: 8 matches Puebla; Santos Laguna
- Longest losing run: Apertura: 6 matches Puebla; Querétaro; Clausura: 6 matches Atlético San Luis; Santos Laguna
- Highest attendance: Apertura: 51,983; Monterrey vs Tigres UANL (19 October 2024); Clausura: 50,023; Monterrey vs Atlético San Luis (22 February 2025)
- Lowest attendance: Apertura: 5,147; Puebla vs Juárez (28 September 2024); Clausura: 6,315; Juárez vs Puebla (1 March 2025)
- Total attendance: Apertura: 3,296,796; Clausura: 2,911,104
- Average attendance: Apertura: 20,105; Clausura: 21,548
- Stats are from the regular season only Source: Liga MX

The 2024–25 Liga MX season (known as the Liga BBVA MX for sponsorship reasons) was the 78th professional season of the top-flight football league in Mexico. The season was divided into two championships—the Apertura 2024 and the Clausura 2025—each in an identical format and each contested by the same eighteen teams.

== Clubs ==
A total of eighteen clubs participated in the 2024–25 edition of the Liga MX. All had participated in Liga MX since the 2020–21 season.

=== Moves ===
América changed its venue due to works at the Estadio Azteca for the 2026 FIFA World Cup. On 4 July 2024, América announced the Estadio Ciudad de los Deportes as their venue for the Apertura 2024 season.

Cruz Azul changed its venue due logistical issues at the Estadio Ciudad de los Deportes. On 8 January 2025, Cruz Azul announced the Estadio Olímpico Universitario as their venue for the Clausura 2025 season.

=== Stadiums and locations ===
Club	Location	Stadium	Capacity
América	Mexico City	Estadio Ciudad de los Deportes	33,000
Atlas	Guadalajara, Jalisco	Jalisco	55,020
Atlético San Luis	San Luis Potosí, San Luis Potosí	Alfonso Lastras	27,029
Cruz Azul	Mexico City	Olímpico Universitario	58,445
Guadalajara	Zapopan, Jalisco	Akron	46,232
Juárez	Ciudad Juárez, Chihuahua	Olímpico Benito Juárez	19,703
León	León, Guanajuato	León	31,297
Mazatlán	Mazatlán, Sinaloa	El Encanto	20,195
Monterrey	Guadalupe, Nuevo León	BBVA	53,500
Necaxa	Aguascalientes, Aguascalientes	Victoria	23,851
Pachuca	Pachuca, Hidalgo	Hidalgo	25,922
Puebla	Puebla, Puebla	Cuauhtémoc	51,726
Querétaro	Querétaro, Querétaro	Corregidora	34,107
Santos Laguna	Torreón, Coahuila	Corona	29,101
Tijuana	Tijuana, Baja California	Caliente	31,158
Toluca	Toluca, State of Mexico	Nemesio Díez	27,273
Tigres UANL	San Nicolás de los Garza, Nuevo León	Universitario	41,886
Pumas UNAM	Mexico City	Olímpico Universitario	58,445

1. The Estadio Azteca was closed from 2024 to 2025 due to renovations for the 2026 FIFA World Cup.

=== Stadium changes ===
Cruz Azul (Clausura 2025)
Estadio Olímpico Universitario
Capacity: 58,445

Locations of the 2024–25 Liga MX teams
Greater Mexico City Liga MX football clubs

=== Personnel and kits ===
Club	Chairman	Head coach	Captain	Kit manufacturer	Shirt sponsor(s)	
Club	Chairman	Head coach	Captain	Kit manufacturer	Front	Other
América	Santiago Baños	(Brazil) André Jardine	(Mexico) Henry Martín	Nike	Caliente	List: Front: None; Back: Corona, Coca-Cola; Sleeves: Restonic, GNP Seguros; Shorts: Caliente; Socks: Carl's Jr.
Atlas	José Riestra	(Mexico) Gonzalo Pineda	(Mexico) Aldo Rocha	Charly	Caliente	List: Front: Urrea, Totalplay, Perdura; Back: Seguros Atlas, Dalton Corporación, Akron Grupo; Sleeves: Berel, Omnibus de México, Red Cola, Electrolit; Shorts: Agua Skarch, Hospital Country 2000, Chimex; Socks: Perdura
Atlético San Luis	Jacobo Payán Espinosa	(Spain) Domènec Torrent	(Mexico) Javier Güémez	Sporelli	Canel's	List: Front: Daikin, BHFitness, Nexen Tire, Laboratorio Tequis, Cementos Moctezuma; Back: Caliente, Potosí, Seguros El Potosí; Sleeves: Primera Plus, Red Cola, Mobil; Shorts: Libertad Soluciones de Vida, H-E-B, BRR Binasa, Caliente; Socks: Cementos Moctezuma
Cruz Azul	Víctor Velázquez	(Uruguay) Vicente Sánchez	(Uruguay) Ignacio Rivero	Pirma	Cemento Cruz Azul	List: Front: None; Back: Caliente, Cemix; Sleeves: Bankaool; Shorts: None; Socks: None
Guadalajara	Amaury Vergara	(Mexico) Gerardo Espinoza	(Mexico) Víctor Guzmán	Puma	Caliente	List: Front: MG Motor, Mercado Pago; Back: Omnilife, Akron Grupo, Axen Capital; Sleeves: GNP Seguros; Shorts: Caliente, Carl's Jr., Autobuses Futura; Socks: Perdura
Juárez	Andrés Fassi	(Uruguay) Martín Varini	(Costa Rica) Francisco Calvo	Sporelli	None	List: Front: None; Back: Del Rio, S-Mart; Sleeves: Hágalo Home Center; Shorts: www.bravotienda.com; Socks: None
León	Jesús Martínez Murguia	(Argentina) Eduardo Berizzo	(Mexico) Andrés Guardado	Charly	Cementos Fortaleza	List: Front: Telcel, Ciudad Maderas, Office Depot; Back: Caliente, La Alemana, Mazda; Sleeves: Primera Plus, TUDN, Berel, Oxxo Gas; Shorts: Hotsson Hotels, Leche León, La Alemana, Broxel; Socks: Perdura
Mazatlán	Mauricio Lanz González	(Mexico) Víctor Manuel Vucetich	(Ecuador) Jefferson Intriago	Pirma	Caliente	List: Front: Paquetexpress, Banda el Recodo, dportenis; Back: Corona, Banco Azteca, El Encanto Desarrollos; Sleeves: Primera Plus, Hilton Hotels & Resorts, Aeternus Funerales, Totalplay; Shorts: Carl's Jr., Caliente, Grupo STI, ADE1000 Pegazulejo, Nazil; Socks: None
Monterrey	José Antonio Noriega	(Argentina) Martín Demichelis	(Mexico) Héctor Moreno	Puma	Codere	List: Front: BBVA, Howo, Vidusa; Back: Tecate, Oxxo Gas, H-E-B; Sleeves: Berel, CREST México, Nowports; Shorts: Hospital Angeles; Socks: Viva Aerobus
Necaxa	Ernesto Tinajero Flores	(Argentina) Nicolás Larcamón	(Mexico) Alexis Peña	Pirma	Rolcar	List: Front: Playdoit, J.M. Romo, Bionda, BrandMe; Back: Playdoit, Grupo San Cristóbal, Sisolar, Epa!; Sleeves: Mobil, ETN Turistar, Megacable; Shorts: Gas Noel, Carl's Jr., ETN Turistar, L'ANQGEL, Playdoit, Centro Médico La Salud; Socks: Perdura
Pachuca	Armando Martínez Patiño	(Uruguay) Guillermo Almada	(Argentina) Gustavo Cabral	Charly	Cementos Fortaleza	List: Front: Playdoit, JAC, Grupo Inmobiliario Crimsa, Telcel; Back: Office Depot, Pastes Kiko's, Playdoit; Sleeves: Berel, TUDN, Laboratorio Santa María; Shorts: Héroes por la Vida, Terrawind, Playdoit, Eurus Aviation, Broxel, Autobuses de Oriente; Socks: Pegazulejo Fortec
Puebla	Manuel Jiménez García	(Argentina) Pablo Guede	(Mexico) Diego de Buen	Pirma	Caliente	List: Front: Volkswagen, Nikko Autoparts; Back: Banco Azteca, Red Cola, Ciudad Maderas, Mobil Super; Sleeves: Flanax, Totalplay, Leche Tamariz, Terrawind; Shorts: Beriscan Pro, Caliente, Carl's Jr., Hospital Angeles; Socks: Perdura
Querétaro	Juan Olvera	(Mexico) Benjamín Mora	(Mexico) Kevin Escamilla	Keuka	Pedigree	List: Front: Caliente, Conspiradores de Querétaro, Petro Figue's, Caja Morelia Valladolid, Sayer; Back: Ciudad Maderas, Afirme, M&M's, H-E-B; Sleeves: Red Cola, Bohn, Harinera Monarca, Garmo Click; Shorts: Caliente, Hospital Angeles; Socks: Perdura
Santos Laguna	Aleco Irarragorri Kalb	(Argentina) Fernando Ortiz	(Mexico) Carlos Acevedo	Charly	Soriana	List: Front: Peñoles, Lala, Grupo SIMSA; Back: Corona, Caliente, Lala; Sleeves: Omnibus de México, Sanatorio Español, Grupo Alameda, Berel; Shorts: Aeroméxico, Totalplay, City Club; Socks: Grupo SIMSA
Tijuana	Jorge Hank Inzunsa	(Mexico) Cirilo Saucedo (Interim)	(Colombia) Christian Rivera	Charly	Caliente	List: Front: Carl's Jr.; Back: Calimax, Caliente, Afirme, Telcel; Sleeves: Autobuses Baja California, Caliente; Shorts: Petsa Express, Billú, Caliente, Sukarne; Socks: Evervital
Toluca	Arturo Pérez Arredondo	(Argentina) Antonio Mohamed	(Mexico) Alexis Vega	New Balance	Roshfrans	List: Front: None; Back: Corona, Caliente; Sleeves: Red Cola, Roshfrans; Shorts: Caliente; Socks: None
Tigres UANL	Mauricio Culebro	(Argentina) Guido Pizarro	Vacant	Adidas	Cemex	List: Front: Cemento Monterrey; Back: Tecate, Afirme, H-E-B; Sleeves: Berel, Telcel, Chirey; Shorts: Oxxo Gas, Vertua; Socks: Viva Aerobus
Pumas UNAM	Luis Raúl González	(Mexico) Efraín Juárez	(Argentina) Lisandro Magallán	Nike	DHL	List: Front: Mifel; Back: Telcel, Suzuki, Caliente; Sleeves: Raloy Lubricantes, Berel, GNP Seguros; Shorts: Autobuses Futura, KEM Autopartes; Socks: None

=== Managerial/coaching changes ===
Club	Outgoing manager/coach	Manner of departure	Date of vacancy	Replaced by	Date of appointment	Position in table	Ref.
Pre-Apertura changes
Atlético San Luis	(Brazil) Gustavo Leal	Sacked	29 April 2024	(Spain) Domènec Torrent	15 May 2024	Pre–season	
Tijuana	(Mexico) Miguel Herrera	Sacked	1 May 2024	(Colombia) Juan Carlos Osorio	24 May 2024	Pre–season	
Mazatlán	(Mexico) Gilberto Adame (Interim)	End of tenure as caretaker	7 May 2024	(Mexico) Víctor Manuel Vucetich	7 May 2024	Pre–season	
Puebla	(Argentina) Andrés Carevic	Sacked	8 May 2024	(Mexico) José Manuel de la Torre	22 May 2024	Pre–season	
Tigres UANL	(Uruguay) Robert Siboldi	Sacked	5 June 2024	(Serbia) Veljko Paunović	9 June 2024	Pre–season	
Apertura changes
Monterrey	(Argentina) Fernando Ortiz	Sacked	6 August 2024	(Argentina) Nicolás Sánchez (Interim)	6 August 2024	4th	
Monterrey	(Argentina) Nicolás Sánchez (Interim)	End of tenure as caretaker	18 August 2024	(Argentina) Martín Demichelis	18 August 2024	1st	
León	(Uruguay) Jorge Bava	Sacked	1 September 2024	(Argentina) Eduardo Berizzo	7 September 2024	16th	
Guadalajara	(Argentina) Fernando Gago	Mutual agreement	10 October 2024	(Mexico) Arturo Ortega (Interim)	10 October 2024	9th	
Necaxa	(Mexico) Eduardo Fentanes	Sacked	28 October 2024	(Mexico) Luis Padilla (Interim)	28 October 2024	13th	
Juárez	(Brazil) Maurício Barbieri	Sacked	29 October 2024	(Spain) Salvador Valero (Interim)	29 October 2024	17th	
Pre–Clausura changes
Santos Laguna	(Mexico) Ignacio Ambríz	Resigned	11 November 2024	(Argentina) Fernando Ortiz	23 November 2024	Pre–season	
Puebla	(Mexico) José Manuel de la Torre	Sacked	14 November 2024	(Argentina) Pablo Guede	2 December 2024	Pre–season	
Guadalajara	(Mexico) Arturo Ortega (Interim)	End of tenure as caretaker	22 November 2024	(Spain) Óscar García	2 December 2024	Pre–season	
Necaxa	(Mexico) Luis Padilla (Interim)	End of tenure as caretaker	26 November 2024	(Argentina) Nicolás Larcamón	26 November 2024	Pre–season	
Juárez	(Spain) Salvador Valero (Interim)	End of tenure as caretaker	29 November 2024	(Uruguay) Martín Varini	29 November 2024	Pre–season	
Toluca	(Portugal) Renato Paiva	End of contract	4 December 2024	(Argentina) Antonio Mohamed	11 December 2024	Pre–season	
Querétaro	(Argentina) Mauro Gerk	Sacked	6 December 2024	(Mexico) Benjamín Mora	7 December 2024	Pre–season	
Atlas	(Spain) Beñat San José	Mutual agreement	9 December 2024	(Mexico) Gonzalo Pineda	12 December 2024	Pre–season	
Clausura changes
Cruz Azul	(Argentina) Martín Anselmi	Signed by FC Porto	24 January 2025	(Uruguay) Vicente Sánchez (Interim)	24 January 2025	17th	
Cruz Azul	(Uruguay) Vicente Sánchez (Interim)	Ratified as manager	23 February 2025	(Uruguay) Vicente Sánchez	23 February 2025	4th	
Pumas UNAM	(Argentina) Gustavo Lema	Mutual agreement	26 February 2025	(Mexico) Raúl Alpizar (Interim)	26 February 2025	12th	
Tigres UANL	(Serbia) Veljko Paunović	Sacked	2 March 2025	(Argentina) Guido Pizarro	2 March 2025	3rd	
Pumas UNAM	(Mexico) Raúl Alpizar (Interim)	End of tenure as caretaker	2 March 2025	(Mexico) Efraín Juárez	2 March 2025	12th	
Guadalajara	(Spain) Óscar García	Mutual agreement	3 March 2025	(Mexico) Gerardo Espinoza	3 March 2025	10th	
Tijuana	(Colombia) Juan Carlos Osorio	Sacked	11 March 2025	(Mexico) Cirilo Saucedo (Interim)	14 March 2025	18th	

== Torneo Apertura ==
The Apertura 2024 was the first tournament of the season and began on 5 July 2024. The defending champions were América. The season was paused in mid-July due to the 2024 Leagues Cup and resumed on 23 August.

=== Regular phase ===
==== League table ====
Pos	Team	Pld	W	D	L	GF	GA	GD	Pts	Qualification
1	Cruz Azul	17	13	3	1	39	12	+27	42	Qualification for the quarter–finals (Note: The first six places in the table qualifed for the Liguilla quarter-finals.)
2	Toluca	17	10	5	2	38	16	+22	35	Qualification for the quarter–finals
3	Tigres UANL	17	10	4	3	25	15	+10	34	Qualification for the quarter–finals
4	Pumas UNAM	17	9	4	4	21	13	+8	31	Qualification for the quarter–finals
5	Monterrey	17	9	4	4	26	19	+7	31	Qualification for the quarter–finals
6	Atlético San Luis	17	9	3	5	27	19	+8	30	Qualification for the quarter–finals
7	Tijuana	17	8	5	4	24	25	−1	29	Qualification for the play-in round (Note: Teams ranked 7th to 10th qualified for the play-in round.)
8	América (C)	17	8	3	6	27	21	+6	27	Qualification for the play-in round
9	Guadalajara	17	7	4	6	24	15	+9	25	Qualification for the play-in round
10	Atlas	17	5	7	5	17	23	−6	22	Qualification for the play-in round
11	León	17	3	9	5	21	23	−2	18	
12	Juárez	17	5	2	10	22	36	−14	17	
13	Necaxa	17	3	6	8	20	26	−6	15	
14	Mazatlán	17	2	8	7	10	19	−9	14	
15	Puebla	17	4	2	11	17	31	−14	14	
16	Pachuca	17	3	4	10	20	29	−9	13	
17	Querétaro	17	3	3	11	13	31	−18	12	
18	Santos Laguna	17	2	4	11	12	30	−18	10	

Source: Liga MX
Rules for classification: 1) Points; 2) Goal difference; 3) Number of goals scored; 4) Head-to-head results between tied teams; 5) Number of goals scored away; 6) Highest relegation coefficient; 7) Fair Play points
(C) Champions

=== Results ===
Clubs played every other once (either home or away), completing a total of 17 rounds.

Home \ Away	AMÉ	ATL	ASL	CAZ	GUA	JUÁ	LEÓ	MAZ	MON	NEC	PAC	PUE	QUE	SAN	TIJ	TOL	UNL	UNM
América	—	3–0	—	—	1–0	—	—	—	2–1	—	2–1	0–1	3–1	3–0	—	—	—	0–1
Atlas	—	—	—	1–1	—	—	—	0–0	—	—	2–0	—	0–1	1–0	0–0	—	1–1	2–1
Atlético San Luis	2–1	2–1	—	3–1	—	—	—	—	1–0	—	—	2–0	4–0	3–1	1–1	—	—	—
Cruz Azul	4–1	—	—	—	1–0	4–0	—	1–0	—	3–0	—	—	—	2–0	3–0	1–1	1–1	—
Guadalajara	—	2–3	0–1	—	—	5–0	2–0	2–0	1–1	3–2	—	—	—	—	—	0–0	—	0–0
Juárez	1–2	2–2	2–4	—	—	—	2–3	1–0	—	—	—	—	—	—	1–1	—	0–1	1–2
León	1–1	0–0	1–0	1–2	—	—	—	0–0	—	1–1	0–0	—	4–0	1–1	—	—	—	—
Mazatlán	0–5	—	2–2	—	—	—	—	—	—	0–0	3–0	1–1	2–2	—	—	—	2–0	0–1
Monterrey	—	4–0	—	0–4	—	3–2	2–1	0–0	—	—	—	—	2–1	—	—	1–2	4–2	0–0
Necaxa	1–1	0–0	1–1	—	—	3–0	—	—	0–1	—	—	4–1	—	—	1–2	1–3	—	2–0
Pachuca	—	—	2–0	2–4	0–2	0–1	—	—	0–1	6–2	—	—	1–1	—	—	2–2	—	—
Puebla	—	1–2	—	1–2	1–0	2–3	2–2	—	1–2	—	2–3	—	2–1	1–0	—	—	—	—
Querétaro	—	—	—	0–2	0–2	1–2	—	—	—	0–0	—	—	—	3–2	1–2	0–1	1–0	—
Santos Laguna	—	—	—	—	0–2	0–2	—	0–0	0–2	3–2	1–1	—	—	—	—	2–0	0–3	1–1
Tijuana	2–2	—	—	—	4–2	—	2–1	1–0	2–2	—	2–1	2–1	—	3–1	—	—	0–3	—
Toluca	4–0	4–1	2–1	—	—	3–2	2–2	3–0	—	—	—	5–0	—	—	4–0	—	—	1–1
Tigres UANL	1–0	—	1–0	—	1–1	—	2–2	—	—	1–0	2–1	1–0	—	—	—	2–1	—	—
Pumas UNAM	—	—	3–0	0–2	—	—	4–1	—	—	—	2–0	1–0	2–0	—	1–0	—	1–3	—

Source: Liga MX
Legend: Blue = home team win; Yellow = draw; Red = away team win.
For upcoming matches, an "a" indicates there is an article about the rivalry between the two participants.

=== Regular season statistics ===
==== Top goalscorers ====
Players sorted first by goals scored, then by last name.

Rank	Player	Club	Goals
1	(Portugal) Paulinho	Toluca	13
2	(Mexico) Ángel Sepúlveda	Cruz Azul	9
3	(Spain) Sergio Canales	Monterrey	8
3	(Mexico) Henry Martín	América	8
5	(France) André-Pierre Gignac	Tigres UANL	7
5	(Colombia) Óscar Estupiñán	Juárez	7
5	(Argentina) Carlos Rotondi	Cruz Azul	7
8	(Mexico) Germán Berterame	Monterrey	6
8	(Greece) Giorgos Giakoumakis	Cruz Azul	6
10	(Uruguay) Rodrigo Aguirre	América	5
10	(Mexico) Roberto Alvarado	Guadalajara	5
10	(Mexico) Jesús R. Angulo	Toluca	5
10	(Venezuela) Jhonder Cádiz	León	5
10	(Colombia) Diber Cambindo	Necaxa	5
10	(United States) Cade Cowell	Guadalajara	5
10	(Argentina) Lorenzo Faravelli	Cruz Azul	5
10	(Mexico) César Huerta	Pumas UNAM	5
10	(Colombia) Christian Rivera	Tijuana	5
10	(Uruguay) Ignacio Rivero	Cruz Azul	5
10	(Venezuela) Salomón Rondón	Pachuca	5
10	(France) Sébastien Salles-Lamonge	Atlético San Luis	5

Source: Liga MX

==== Top assists ====
Rank	Player	Club	Assists
1	(Mexico) Henry Martín	América	6
1	(Mexico) Luis Romo	Cruz Azul	6
3	(Portugal) Paulinho	Toluca	5
3	(Argentina) José Paradela	Necaxa	5
3	(Mexico) Carlos Rodríguez	Cruz Azul	5
6	(Mexico) Roberto Alvarado	Guadalajara	4
6	(Mexico) Jesús R. Angulo	Toluca	4
6	(Mexico) Sebastián Córdova	Tigres UANL	4
6	(Mexico) Raymundo Fulgencio	Atlas	4
6	(Mexico) Jesús Gallardo	Toluca	4
6	(Greece) Giorgos Giakoumakis	Cruz Azul	4
6	(Mexico) Ronaldo Nájera	Atlético San Luis	4
6	(Argentina) Lucas Ocampos	Monterrey	4
6	(Mexico) Ralph Orquin	Juárez	4
6	(Argentina) Carlos Rotondi	Cruz Azul	4

Source: Soccerway

==== Clean sheets ====
Rank	Player	Club	Clean sheets	Avg.
1	(Colombia) Kevin Mier	Cruz Azul	9	0.71
2	(Mexico) Raúl Rangel	Guadalajara	8	0.88
2	(Mexico) Hugo González	Mazatlán	8	1.12
4	(Mexico) Julio González	Pumas UNAM	6	0.92
4	(Brazil) Tiago Volpi	Toluca	6	0.94
4	(Argentina) Esteban Andrada	Monterrey	6	1.13
7	(Mexico) Alfonso Blanco	León	5	1.31
7	(Colombia) Camilo Vargas	Atlas	5	1.43
7	(Argentina) Ezequiel Unsain	Necaxa	5	1.53
10	(Argentina) Nahuel Guzmán	Tigres UANL	4	1.09
10	(Mexico) Luis Malagón	América	4	1.20

Source: FBRef

==== Hat-tricks ====
Player	For	Against	Result	Date	Round
(Mexico) Jesús Angulo	Toluca	Necaxa	3–1 (A)	27 October 2024	14
(Venezuela) Salomón Rondón	Pachuca	Necaxa	6–2 (H)	2 November 2024	15

(H) – Home; (A) – Away

==== Scoring ====
- First goal of the season:
- (Canada) Lucas Cavallini for Puebla against Santos Laguna
- Last goal of the season:
- (Paraguay) Carlos González for Tijuana against Puebla

==== Discipline ====
Player

- Most yellow cards: 7
  - (Mexico) Marcel Ruiz (Toluca)
- Most red cards: 1
  - 35 players

Team

- Most yellow cards: 49
  - Santos Laguna
- Most red cards: 6
  - Pachuca
- Fewest yellow cards: 27
  - Tijuana
- Fewest red cards: 0
  - Atlético San Luis
  - Guadalajara
  - Mazatlán
  - Tijuana
  - Pumas UNAM

Source: Liga MX

=== Attendance ===
Pos	Team	Total	High	Low	Average	Change
1	Monterrey	384,318	51,983	36,441	42,702	−1.5%
2	Tigres UANL	305,974	41,615	26,270	38,247	−1.6%
3	Guadalajara	319,651	40,846	31,120	35,517	−2.1%
4	Toluca	226,321	27,273	22,646	25,147	−0.4%
5	Cruz Azul	220,289	26,536	15,206	24,477	−18.3%
6	Tijuana	205,297	29,333	18,333	22,811	+9.8%
7	América	170,386	40,814	9,997	21,298	−49.5%^{1}
8	Pumas UNAM	152,228	37,576	7,606	19,029	−25.3%
9	León	158,464	21,585	13,279	17,607	−23.0%
10	Necaxa	142,540	20,147	12,967	15,838	−9.8%
11	Atlético San Luis	124,059	21,480	11,214	15,507	−9.7%
12	Querétaro	111,910	28,891	6,391	13,989	−5.3%
13	Atlas	111,609	24,204	10,038	13,951	−31.7%
14	Puebla	124,453	34,978	5,147	13,828	−20.9%
15	Pachuca	85,703	18,262	5,541	10,713	−33.8%
16	Mazatlán	76,178	16,325	7,773	9,522	−15.9%
17	Santos Laguna	84,785	12,537	6,096	9,421	−43.3%
18	Juárez	71,837	14,917	6,098	8,980	−23.3%
	League total	3,076,002	51,983	5,147	20,105	−13.9%

Source: Liga MX
Notes:
Only regular season listed.
1: América played their matches in another stadium due to Estadio Azteca renovation works.

==== Highest and lowest ====
Highest attended					Lowest attended			
Week	Home	Score	Away	Attendance	Home	Score	Away	Attendance
1	Tigres UANL	1–0	Necaxa	40,371	Juárez	2–2	Atlas	7,046
2	Monterrey	0–4	Cruz Azul	45,957	Mazatlán	2–2	Atlético San Luis	9,147
3	Tigres UANL	1–0	América	41,615	Puebla	2–2	León	7,883
4	Monterrey	2–1	Querétaro	39,932	Puebla	1–2	Atlas	10,847
5	Tigres UANL	1–1	Guadalajara	41,615	Mazatlán	3–0	Pachuca	9,095
6	Monterrey	1–2	Toluca	43,150	Mazatlán	1–1	Puebla	8,357
7	Tigres UANL	1–0	Atlético San Luis	40,263	Puebla	2–1	Querétaro	8,266
8	Monterrey	3–2	Juárez	36,441	Mazatlán	0–0	Necaxa	7,247
9	Monterrey	0–0	Mazatlán	43,721	Puebla	2–3	Pachuca	7,676
10	Tigres UANL	2–2	León	39,834	Puebla	2–3	Juárez	5,147
11	Guadalajara	2–3	Atlas	40,846	Santos Laguna	0–2	Juárez	7,341
12	Monterrey	4–2	Tigres UANL	51,983	Juárez	2–3	León	8,235
13	Monterrey	0–0	Pumas UNAM	40,959	Santos Laguna	1–1	Pachuca	6,531
14	Pumas UNAM	0–2	Cruz Azul	37,576	Santos Laguna	0–0	Mazatlán	6,096
15	Monterrey	4–0	Atlas	40,381	Pachuca	6–2	Necaxa	5,541
16	Tigres UANL	2–1	Toluca	40,830	Juárez	1–1	Tijuana	6,098
17	Monterrey	2–1	León	41,874	Pachuca	0–1	Juárez	5,879

Source: Liga MX

1. Does not include matches played behind closed doors.

=== Final phase ===
==== Play-in round ====
The 9th place team hosted the 10th place team in an elimination game. The 7th hosted the 8th place team in the double-chance game, with the winner advancing as the 7-seed. The loser of this game then hosted the winner of the elimination game between the 9th and 10th place teams to determine the 8-seed.

Play-in games
Serie A
7	Tijuana	2 (2)
8	América	2 (3)
Serie B
9	Guadalajara	1
10	Atlas	2

No. 8 seed game
7	Tijuana	3
10	Atlas	0

Final seeds
8	América	No. 7 seed
7	Tijuana	No. 8 seed

===== Play-in matches =====
Team 1	Score	Team 2
Tijuana	2–2 (2–3 p)	América
Guadalajara	1–2	Atlas

Team 1	Score	Team 2
Tijuana	3–0	Atlas

==== Bracket ====
Quarter-finals
4	UNAM	0	3	3
5	Monterrey	1	5	6
3	UANL	0	0	0
6	Atlético San Luis	3	0	3
1	Cruz Azul (s)	0	3	3
8	Tijuana	3	0	3
2	Toluca	0	0	0
7	América	2	2	4

Semi-finals
5	Monterrey	1	5	6
6	Atlético San Luis	2	1	3
1	Cruz Azul	0	3	3
7	América	0	4	4

Finals
5	Monterrey	1	1	2
7	América	2	1	3

==== Quarterfinals ====
Team 1	Agg.	Team 2	1st leg	2nd leg
Tijuana	3–3 (s)	Cruz Azul	3–0	0–3
América	4–0	Toluca	2–0	2–0
Atlético San Luis	3–0	UANL	3–0	0–0
Monterrey	6–3	UNAM	1–0	5–3

==== Semifinals ====
Team 1	Agg.	Team 2	1st leg	2nd leg
América	4–3	Cruz Azul	0–0	4–3
Atlético San Luis	3–6	Monterrey	2–1	1–5

==== Finals ====
Team 1	Agg.	Team 2	1st leg	2nd leg
América	3–2	Monterrey	2–1	1–1

12 December 2024
20:00 CST (UTC−6)

América	2–1	Monterrey
Álvarez 39'; Zendejas 49'	Report	Canales 35'

Estadio Cuauhtémoc, Puebla
Attendance: 36,933
Referee: Víctor Alfonso Cáceres (Chiapas)
15 December 2024
19:00 CST (UTC−6)

Monterrey	1–1	América
Rojas 85'	Report	R. Sánchez 24'

Estadio BBVA, Guadalupe
Attendance: 52,127
Referee: César Arturo Ramos (Sinaloa)

América won 3–2 on aggregate.

== Torneo Clausura ==
The Clausura tournament began on 10 January 2025.

=== Regular phase ===
==== League table ====
Pos	Team	Pld	W	D	L	GF	GA	GD	Pts	Qualification
1	Toluca (C)	17	11	4	2	41	22	+19	37	Qualification for the quarter–finals (Note: The first six places in the table qualified for the Liguilla quarter-finals.)
2	América	17	10	4	3	34	10	+24	34	Qualification for the quarter–finals
3	Cruz Azul	17	9	6	2	26	16	+10	33	Qualification for the quarter–finals
4	Tigres UANL	17	10	3	4	24	14	+10	33	Qualification for the quarter–finals
5	Necaxa	17	10	1	6	36	29	+7	31	Qualification for the quarter–finals
6	León	17	9	3	5	24	21	+3	30	Qualification for the quarter–finals
7	Monterrey	17	8	4	5	32	23	+9	28	Qualification for the play-in round (Note: Teams ranked 7th to 10th qualified for the play-in round.)
8	Pachuca	17	8	4	5	29	23	+6	28	Qualification for the play-in round
9	Juárez	17	6	6	5	16	21	−5	24	Qualification for the play-in round
10	Pumas UNAM	17	6	3	8	23	26	−3	21	Qualification for the play-in round
11	Guadalajara	17	5	6	6	18	21	−3	21	
12	Querétaro	17	6	2	9	17	24	−7	20	
13	Tijuana	17	6	1	10	29	35	−6	19	
14	Atlas	17	4	6	7	25	32	−7	18	
15	Atlético San Luis	17	6	0	11	20	33	−13	18	
16	Mazatlán	17	4	5	8	16	26	−10	17	Team ended last place in the coefficient table (Note: Team ranked last in the coefficient table was ineligible for the final phase.)
17	Puebla	17	2	3	12	12	25	−13	9	
18	Santos Laguna	17	2	1	14	15	36	−21	7	

Source: Liga MX
Rules for classification: 1) Points; 2) Goal difference; 3) Number of goals scored; 4) Head-to-head results between tied teams; 5) Number of goals scored away; 6) Highest relegation coefficient; 7) Fair Play points
(C) Champions

=== Results ===
Clubs played every other once (either home or away), completing a total of 17 rounds.

Home \ Away	AMÉ	ATL	ASL	CAZ	GUA	JUÁ	LEÓ	MAZ	MON	NEC	PAC	PUE	QUE	SAN	TIJ	TOL	UNL	UNM
América	—	—	3–0	0–0	—	4–0	1–1	5–0	—	2–3	—	—	—	—	1–1	3–0	3–0	—
Atlas	1–3	—	3–1	—	1–1	1–1	1–2	—	3–3	0–4	—	3–2	—	—	—	2–3	—	—
Atlético San Luis	—	—	—	—	3–1	1–0	1–2	2–1	—	0–3	2–1	—	—	—	—	0–1	1–3	2–3
Cruz Azul	—	1–1	3–0	—	—	—	2–1	—	1–1	—	2–1	1–1	1–0	—	—	—	—	3–2
Guadalajara	0–0	—	—	0–1	—	—	—	—	—	—	2–1	1–0	1–1	1–0	2–1	—	1–1	—
Juárez	—	—	—	1–0	1–1	—	—	—	2–1	2–2	2–2	2–0	0–2	1–0	—	0–4	—	—
León	—	—	—	—	2–1	1–0	—	—	0–2	—	—	1–0	—	—	2–1	3–3	1–0	1–2
Mazatlán	—	3–2	—	1–1	1–1	1–1	1–2	—	1–0	—	—	—	—	1–1	0–2	2–1	—	—
Monterrey	1–0	—	3–1	—	3–1	—	—	—	—	1–0	2–3	1–1	—	4–2	1–2	—	—	—
Necaxa	—	—	—	1–3	3–2	—	2–1	3–1	—	—	3–5	—	2–0	3–2	—	—	1–2	—
Pachuca	1–0	0–0	—	—	—	—	1–2	1–1	—	—	—	2–1	—	2–1	4–1	—	0–0	2–1
Puebla	1–2	—	1–2	—	—	—	—	0–1	—	0–1	—	—	—	—	2–0	0–3	0–0	1–3
Querétaro	0–1	1–2	1–0	—	—	—	1–1	1–0	2–4	—	0–1	2–0	—	—	—	—	—	3–2
Santos Laguna	1–4	2–0	2–3	0–1	—	—	2–1	—	—	—	—	0–2	1–2	—	0–4	—	—	—
Tijuana	—	3–4	2–1	2–3	—	1–2	—	—	—	1–2	—	—	2–1	—	—	2–4	—	4–2
Toluca	—	—	—	2–2	2–1	—	—	—	1–1	5–2	3–2	—	5–0	2–1	—	—	1–0	—
Tigres UANL	—	2–1	—	2–1	—	0–1	—	2–1	2–1	—	—	—	1–0	3–0	4–0	—	—	2–1
Pumas UNAM	0–2	0–0	—	—	0–1	0–0	—	1–0	1–3	2–1	—	—	—	2–0	—	1–1	—	—

Source: Liga MX
Legend: Blue = home team win; Yellow = draw; Red = away team win.
For upcoming matches, an "a" indicates there is an article about the rivalry between the two participants.

=== Regular season statistics ===
==== Top goalscorers ====
Players sorted first by goals scored, then by last name.

Rank	Player	Club	Goals
1	(Portugal) Paulinho	Toluca	12
1	(Montenegro) Uroš Đurđević	Atlas	12
1	(Colombia) Raúl Zúñiga	Tijuana	12
4	(Colombia) Diber Cambindo	Necaxa	11
5	(Brazil) John Kennedy	Pachuca	9
5	(Venezuela) Salomón Rondón	Pachuca	9
5	(Mexico) Alexis Vega	Toluca	9
8	(Argentina) José Paradela	Necaxa	8
9	(Mexico) Germán Berterame	Monterrey	7
9	(Venezuela) Jhonder Cádiz	León	7
9	(Chile) Víctor Dávila	América	7
9	(Spain) Álvaro Fidalgo	América	7

Source: Soccerway

==== Top assists ====
Players sorted first by number of assists, then by last name.

Rank	Player	Club	Assists
1	(Mexico) Alexis Vega	Toluca	8
2	(Mexico) Jesús Corona	Monterrey	7
2	(Argentina) José Paradela	Necaxa	7
4	(Spain) Sergio Canales	Monterrey	6
4	(Morocco) Oussama Idrissi	Pachuca	6
4	(Colombia) James Rodríguez	León	6
4	(United States) Alejandro Zendejas	América	6
8	(Mexico) Jesús Angulo	Toluca	5
8	(Mexico) Marcel Ruiz	Toluca	5
8	(Uruguay) Juan Manuel Sanabria	Atlético San Luis	5

Source: Soccerway

==== Clean sheets ====
Rank	Player	Club	Clean sheets	Avg.
1	(Mexico) Luis Malagón	América	7	0.67
2	(Argentina) Nahuel Guzmán	Tigres UANL	5	0.82
2	(Colombia) Kevin Mier	Cruz Azul	5	0.94
2	(Mexico) Sebastián Jurado	Juárez	5	1.24
5	(Spain) Pau López	Toluca	4	1.30
5	(Mexico) Carlos Moreno	Pachuca	4	1.35
5	(Argentina) Ezequiel Unsain	Necaxa	4	1.71
8	(Mexico) Raúl Rangel	Guadalajara	3	1.13
9	(Mexico) Rodolfo Cota	América	2	0.50
9	(Mexico) Alfonso Blanco	León	2	1.00
9	(Mexico) Pablo Lara	Pumas UNAM	2	1.29
9	(Mexico) Guillermo Allison	Querétaro	2	1.38
9	(Argentina) Esteban Andrada	Monterrey	2	1.38
9	(Mexico) Salim Hernández	Querétaro	2	1.44
9	(Mexico) Hugo González	Mazatlán	2	1.53
9	(Mexico) Miguel Jiménez	Puebla	2	1.55
9	(Mexico) Alex Padilla	Pumas UNAM	2	1.7
9	(Mexico) José Antonio Rodríguez	Tijuana	2	1.82
9	(Colombia) Camilo Vargas	Atlas	2	1.88

Source: MedioTiempo

==== Hat-tricks ====
Player	For	Against	Result	Date	Round
(Portugal) Paulinho	Toluca	Juárez	0–4 (A)	22 February 2025	8
(Mexico) Alexis Vega	Toluca	Necaxa	5–2 (H)	8 March 2025	11
(Montenegro) Uroš Đurđević	Atlas	Tijuana	3–4 (A)	9 March 2025	11
(Venezuela) Salomón Rondón	Pachuca	Necaxa	3–5 (A)	11 April 2025	15
(Portugal) Paulinho	Toluca	Atlas	2–3 (A)	12 April 2025	15

(H) – Home; (A) – Away

==== Scoring ====
- First goal of the season:
- (Mexico) Antonio Álvarez for América against Querétaro
- Last goal of the season:
- (Ecuador) Adonis Preciado for Querétaro against Juárez

==== Discipline ====
Player

- Most yellow cards: 8
  - (Mexico) Mateo Chávez (Guadalajara)
  - (Argentina) Lucas Merolla (Mazatlán)
- Most red cards: 2
  - (Colombia) Brayan Angulo (Puebla)
  - (Mexico) Bryan González (Pachuca)

Team

- Most yellow cards: 60
  - Mazatlán
- Most red cards: 6
  - Guadalajara
- Fewest yellow cards: 22
  - América
  - Atlético San Luis
- Fewest red cards: 0
  - Toluca

Source: Liga MX

=== Attendance ===
Pos	Team	Total	High	Low	Average	Change
1	Monterrey	358,568	50,023	37,244	44,821	+5.0%
2	Tigres UANL	346,019	41,615	31,651	38,447	+0.5%
3	Guadalajara	262,929	41,003	24,483	32,866	−7.5%^{3}
4	Toluca	215,064	27,273	24,163	26,883	+6.9%
5	León	180,458	26,673	25,186	25,780	+46.4%
6	América	231,165	29,543	15,499	25,685	+20.6%^{1}
7	Pumas UNAM	190,561	38,246	8,845	21,173	+11.3%
8	Atlas	188,115	34,787	14,312	20,902	+49.8%
9	Cruz Azul	155,753	37,561	9,732	19,469	−20.5%^{2, 4}
10	Necaxa	147,361	20,706	15,639	18,420	+16.3%
11	Tijuana	143,064	23,333	12,333	17,883	−21.6%
12	Puebla	138,006	36,335	11,030	17,251	+24.8%
13	Atlético San Luis	143,289	22,529	10,715	15,921	+2.7%
14	Pachuca	122,590	22,186	10,042	15,324	+43.0%
15	Querétaro	130,173	28,922	8,174	14,464	+3.4%
16	Santos Laguna	112,498	23,111	8,585	14,062	+49.3%
17	Mazatlán	95,915	14,945	7,274	10,657	+11.9%
18	Juárez	88,122	19,124	6,315	9,791	+9.0%
	League total	3,296,796	50,023	6,315	21,548	+7.2%

Source: Liga MX
Notes:
Only regular season listed.
1: América played their home matches at Estadio Ciudad de los Deportes due to Estadio Azteca renovation works.
2: Cruz Azul played their home matches at Estadio Olímpico Universitario due to Estadio Azteca renovation works.
3: Guadalajara played their week 13 match vs Cruz Azul at Estadio Jalisco due to a one-match ban to Estadio Akron.
4: Cruz Azul played their week 14 match vs Pumas UNAM at Estadio Cuauhtémoc.

==== Highest and lowest ====
Highest attended					Lowest attended			
Week	Home	Score	Away	Attendance	Home	Score	Away	Attendance
1	Monterrey	1–1	Puebla	37,244	Mazatlán	1–1	Juárez	9,193
2	Tigres UANL	2–1	Mazatlán	38,310	Juárez	1–0	Cruz Azul	13,256
3	Monterrey	2–3	Pachuca	43,072	Mazatlán	2–1	Toluca	7,951
4	Tigres UANL	4–0	Tijuana	34,668	Juárez	1–0	Santos Laguna	7,189
5	Monterrey	1–0	Necaxa	44,471	Santos Laguna	0–2	Puebla	11,311
6	Tigres UANL	2–1	Atlas	39,454	Querétaro	1–0	Atlético San Luis	8,174
7	Tigres UANL	2–1	Cruz Azul	41,615	Mazatlán	1–1	Santos Laguna	7,274
8	Monterrey	3–1	Atlético San Luis	50,023	Juárez	0–4	Toluca	9,572
9	Tigres UANL	0–1	Juárez	31,651	Pachuca	2–1	Puebla	10,042
10	Monterrey	4–2	Santos Laguna	46,665	Juárez	2–2	Pachuca	6,652
11	Guadalajara	0–0	América	41,003	Atlético San Luis	1–0	Juárez	11,807
12	Tigres UANL	3–0	Santos Laguna	40,133	Querétaro	1–0	Mazatlán	9,871
13	Monterrey	1–2	Tijuana	43,514	Juárez	2–0	Puebla	6,315
14	Monterrey	1–2	Guadalajara	44,481	Atlético San Luis	2–1	Mazatlán	12,154
15	Tigres UANL	2–1	Monterrey	41,615	Santos Laguna	1–2	Querétaro	10,255
16	Monterrey	1–0	América	49,098	Juárez	2–2	Necaxa	10,704
17	Tigres UANL	2–1	Pumas UNAM	38,276	Juárez	0–2	Querétaro	6,525

Source: Liga MX

1. Does not include matches played behind closed doors.

=== Final phase ===
==== Play-in round ====
The 9th place team hosted the 10th place team in an elimination game. The 7th hosted the 8th place team in the double-chance game, with the winner advancing as the 7-seed. The loser of this game then hosted the winner of the elimination game between the 9th and 10th place teams to determine the 8-seed.

Play-in games
Serie A
7	Monterrey	1
8	Pachuca	2
Serie B
9	Juárez	1 (1)
10	UNAM	1 (2)

No. 8 seed game
7	Monterrey	2
10	UNAM	0

Final seeds
8	Pachuca	No. 7 seed
7	Monterrey	No. 8 seed

===== Play-in matches =====
Team 1	Score	Team 2
Monterrey	1–2	Pachuca
Juárez	1–1 (1–2 p)	UNAM

==== No. 8 seed match ====
Team 1	Score	Team 2
Monterrey	2–0	UNAM

==== Bracket ====
Quarter-finals
1	Toluca (s)	2	2	4
8	Monterrey	3	1	4
4	UANL (s)	0	2	2
5	Necaxa	0	2	2
2	América	0	2	2
7	Pachuca	0	0	0
3	Cruz Azul	3	2	5
6	León	2	1	3

Semi-finals
1	Toluca	1	3	4
4	UANL	1	0	1
2	América (s)	0	2	2
3	Cruz Azul	1	1	2

Finals
1	Toluca	0	2	2
2	América	0	0	0

==== Quarter-finals ====
Team 1	Agg.	Team 2	1st leg	2nd leg
Monterrey	4–4 (s)	Toluca	3–2	1–2
Pachuca	0–2	América	0–0	0–2
León	3–5	Cruz Azul	2–3	1–2
Necaxa	2–2 (s)	UANL	0–0	2–2

==== Semi-finals ====
Team 1	Agg.	Team 2	1st leg	2nd leg
UANL	1–4	Toluca	1–1	0–3
Cruz Azul	2–2 (s)	América	1–0	1–2

==== Finals ====
Team 1	Agg.	Team 2	1st leg	2nd leg
América	0–2	Toluca	0–0	0–2

22 May 2025
20:00 CST (UTC−6)

América	0–0	Toluca
	Report

Estadio Ciudad de los Deportes, Mexico City
Attendance: 30,406
Referee: Daniel Quintero Huitrón (Jalisco)
25 May 2025
19:00 CST (UTC−6)

Toluca	2–0	América
Luan 65'; Vega 82' (pen.)	Report

Estadio Nemesio Díez, Toluca
Attendance: 27,273
Referee: César Arturo Ramos (Sinaloa)

Toluca won 2–0 on aggregate.

== Coefficient table ==
As of the 2020–21 season, the promotion and relegation between Liga MX and Liga de Expansión MX (formerly known as Ascenso MX) was suspended, however, the coefficient table was used to establish the payment of fines that were used for the development of the clubs of the silver circuit.

Per Article 24 of the competition regulations, the payment of $MXN160 million was distributed among the last three positioned in the coefficient table as follows: 80 million in the last place; 47 million the penultimate; and 33 million was paid by the sixteenth team in the table, as of the 2021–22 season the remaining $MXN80 million were paid through the financial remnants generated by the Liga MX itself. The team that finished last on the table started the following season with a coefficient of zero. If the last ranked team, which was Tijuana, had repeated as the last ranked team in the 2024–25 season coefficient table, they would be fined an additional $MXN20 million.

Pos	Team	'22 A Pts	'23 C Pts	'23 A Pts	'24 C Pts	'24 A Pts	'25 C Pts	Total Pts	Total Pld	Avg	GD	Fine
1	América	38	34	40	35	27	34	208	102	2.0392	+107	Safe from paying any fine
2	Monterrey	35	40	33	32	31	28	199	102	1.9510	+78	Safe from paying any fine
3	Toluca	27	32	21	32	35	37	184	102	1.8039	+79	Safe from paying any fine
4	Tigres UANL	30	25	30	31	34	33	183	102	1.7941	+57	Safe from paying any fine
5	Cruz Azul	24	24	17	33	42	33	173	102	1.6961	+29	Safe from paying any fine
6	Guadalajara	22	34	27	31	25	21	160	102	1.5686	+25	Safe from paying any fine
7	Pachuca	32	31	22	29	13	28	155	102	1.5196	+14	Safe from paying any fine
8	León	22	30	23	24	18	30	147	102	1.4412	+7	Safe from paying any fine
9	Tijuana	0	0	0	0	29	19	48	34	1.4118	–7	Safe from paying any fine
10	Pumas UNAM	14	18	28	27	31	21	139	102	1.3627	+1	Safe from paying any fine
11	Atlético San Luis	18	19	23	16	30	18	124	102	1.2157	–23	Safe from paying any fine
12	Necaxa	19	14	15	27	15	31	121	102	1.1863	–22	Safe from paying any fine
13	Querétaro	0	0	19	24	12	20	75	68	1.1029	–35	Safe from paying any fine
14	Juárez	19	15	18	16	17	24	109	102	1.0686	–45	Safe from paying any fine
15	Santos Laguna	33	19	23	15	10	7	107	102	1.0490	–52	Safe from paying any fine
16	Atlas (F)	13	21	17	14	22	18	105	102	1.0294	–39	MXN$33 million
17	Puebla (F)	22	20	25	5	14	9	95	102	0.9314	–57	MXN$47 million
18	Mazatlán (F)	17	7	22	16	14	17	93	102	0.9118	–61	MXN$80 million

Rules for fine payment: 1) Fine coefficient; 2) Goal difference; 3) Number of goals scored; 4) Head-to-head results between tied teams; 5) Number of goals scored away; 6) Fair Play points
F = Team had to pay fine indicated
Source: Liga MX

1. 2022–23 accumulated points are not counted towards their relegation coefficient.
2. 2022–23 and 2023–24 accumulated points are not counted towards their relegation coefficient.

== Aggregate tables ==
=== 2024–25 aggregate table ===
The 2024–25 aggregate table (the sum of points of both the Apertura 2024 and Clausura 2025 seasons) was used to determine the participants for the 2026 CONCACAF Champions Cup. The league champions with the most points in the 2024–25 aggregate table qualified directly for the 2026 CONCACAF Champions Cup round of 16, while the league champion with fewer points in the aggregate table qualified for the CONCACAF Champions Cup round one. In addition, both Apertura and Clausura runners-up and the next two best-ranked teams in the table also qualified for the CONCACAF Champions Cup round one. The 2024–25 season champion (first place in table) also received US$1 million in prize money and recognition at the 2025 Balón de Oro.

Pos	Team	Pld	W	D	L	GF	GA	GD	Pts	Qualification or relegation
1	Cruz Azul (S)	34	22	9	3	65	28	+37	75	Qualification for the CONCACAF Champions Cup Round One
2	Toluca (C)	34	21	9	4	79	38	+41	72	Qualification for the CONCACAF Champions Cup Round of 16
3	Tigres UANL	34	20	7	7	49	29	+20	67	Qualification for the CONCACAF Champions Cup Round One
4	América (A)	34	18	7	9	61	31	+30	61	Qualification for the CONCACAF Champions Cup Round One
5	Monterrey	34	17	8	9	58	42	+16	59	Qualification for the CONCACAF Champions Cup Round One
6	Pumas UNAM	34	15	7	12	44	39	+5	52	Qualification for the CONCACAF Champions Cup Round One
7	León	34	12	12	10	45	44	+1	48	
8	Atlético San Luis	34	15	3	16	47	52	−5	48	
9	Tijuana	34	14	6	14	53	60	−7	48	
10	Guadalajara	34	12	10	12	42	36	+6	46	
11	Necaxa	34	13	7	14	56	55	+1	46	
12	Pachuca	34	11	8	15	49	52	−3	41	
13	Juárez	34	11	8	15	38	57	−19	41	
14	Atlas	34	9	13	12	42	55	−13	40	
15	Querétaro	34	9	5	20	30	55	−25	32	
16	Mazatlán	34	6	13	15	26	45	−19	31	Team ended last place in the coefficient table
17	Puebla	34	6	5	23	29	56	−27	23	
18	Santos Laguna	34	4	5	25	27	66	−39	17	

Source: Liga MX
Rules for classification: 1) Points; 2) Goal difference; 3) Number of goals scored; 4) Head-to-head results between tied teams; 5) Number of goals scored away; 6) Highest relegation coefficient; 7) Fair Play points
(A) Apertura champion; (C) Clausura champion; (S) Season champion

=== 2024 aggregate table ===
The 2024 aggregate table (the sum of points of both the Clausura 2024 and Apertura 2024 seasons) was used to determine the seedings for the 2025 Leagues Cup.

Pos	Team	Pld	W	D	L	GF	GA	GD	Pts	Qualification or relegation
1	Cruz Azul	34	23	6	5	62	26	+36	75	2025 Leagues Cup Tier one
2	Toluca	34	19	10	5	76	39	+37	67	2025 Leagues Cup Tier one
3	Tigres UANL	34	19	8	7	59	38	+21	65	2025 Leagues Cup Tier one
4	Monterrey	34	18	9	7	58	38	+20	63	2025 Leagues Cup Tier one
5	América	34	18	8	8	57	33	+24	62	2025 Leagues Cup Tier one
6	Pumas UNAM	34	16	10	8	48	35	+13	58	2025 Leagues Cup Tier one
7	Guadalajara	34	16	8	10	48	32	+16	56	2025 Leagues Cup Tier two
8	Atlético San Luis	34	14	4	16	52	54	−2	46	2025 Leagues Cup Tier two
9	Tijuana	34	10	13	11	45	55	−10	43	2025 Leagues Cup Tier two
10	Pachuca	34	12	6	16	54	56	−2	42	2025 Leagues Cup Tier two
11	León	34	10	12	12	44	48	−4	42	2025 Leagues Cup Tier two
12	Necaxa	34	10	12	12	50	55	−5	42	2025 Leagues Cup Tier two
13	Atlas	34	8	12	14	38	54	−16	36	2025 Leagues Cup Tier three
14	Querétaro	34	9	9	16	35	52	−17	36	2025 Leagues Cup Tier three
15	Juárez	34	9	6	19	41	62	−21	33	2025 Leagues Cup Tier three
16	Mazatlán	34	6	12	16	31	51	−20	30	2025 Leagues Cup Tier three
17	Santos Laguna	34	6	7	21	27	58	−31	25	2025 Leagues Cup Tier three
18	Puebla	34	5	4	25	35	74	−39	19	2025 Leagues Cup Tier three

Source: Liga MX
Rules for classification: 1) Points; 2) Goal difference; 3) Number of goals scored; 4) Head-to-head results between tied teams; 5) Number of goals scored away; 6) Highest relegation coefficient; 7) Fair Play points

== Awards ==
=== Monthly Awards ===
Tournament	Month	Manager of the Month		Player of the Month		Goal of the Month		Save of the Month		References
Tournament	Month	Manager	Club	Player	Club	Player	Club	Player	Club	References
Apertura 2024	July			(United States) Cade Cowell	Guadalajara	(United States) Cade Cowell	Guadalajara	(Mexico) Raúl Rangel	Guadalajara	
Apertura 2024	August									
Apertura 2024	September	(Argentina) Martín Anselmi	Cruz Azul	(Argentina) Carlos Rotondi	Cruz Azul	(Argentina) Lorenzo Faravelli	Cruz Azul	(Colombia) Kevin Mier	Cruz Azul	
Apertura 2024	October	(Argentina) Martín Anselmi	Cruz Azul	(Mexico) Ángel Sepúlveda	Cruz Azul	(Mexico) Iker Fimbres	Monterrey	(Colombia) Camilo Vargas	Atlas	
Apertura 2024	November			(Mexico) Jorge Sánchez	Cruz Azul	(Mexico) Jorge Sánchez	Cruz Azul	(Mexico) José de Jesús Corona	Tijuana	
Apertura 2024	December	(Brazil) André Jardine	América	(Mexico) Ramón Juárez	América	(Paraguay) Richard Sánchez	América	(Mexico) Luis Malagón	América	
Clausura 2025	January	(Brazil) André Jardine	América	(United States) Alejandro Zendejas	América	(United States) Alejandro Zendejas	América	(Mexico) Luis Malagón	América	
Clausura 2025	February	(Brazil) André Jardine	América	(Spain) Álvaro Fidalgo	América	(Mexico) Alexis Vega	Toluca	(Mexico) Luis Malagón	América	
Clausura 2025	March			(Mexico) Alexis Vega	Toluca	(Mexico) Alexis Vega	Toluca	(Mexico) Luis Malagón	América	
Clausura 2025	April	(Argentina) Antonio Mohamed	Toluca	(Portugal) Paulinho	Toluca	(Mexico) Pável Pérez	Necaxa	(Colombia) Kevin Mier	Cruz Azul	
Clausura 2025	May	(Argentina) Antonio Mohamed	Toluca	(Mexico) Alexis Vega	Toluca	(Mexico) Alexis Vega	Toluca	(Mexico) Luis García	Toluca	

=== Semiannual awards ===
Apertura 2024 Best XI
Pos.	Player	Team
GK	(Mexico) Luis Malagón	América
DF	(Mexico) Ramón Juárez	América
DF	(Uruguay) Ignacio Rivero	Cruz Azul
DF	(Mexico) Eduardo Águila	Atlético San Luis
DF	(Argentina) Carlos Rotondi	Cruz Azul
MF	(Brazil) Rodrigo Dourado	Atlético San Luis
MF	(Spain) Álvaro Fidalgo	América
MF	(Spain) Sergio Canales	Monterrey
FW	(Mexico) Henry Martín	América
FW	(Portugal) Paulinho	Toluca
FW	(Mexico) Ángel Sepúlveda	Cruz Azul
Manager: (Brazil) André Jardine (América)

Clausura 2025 Best XI
Pos.	Player	Team
GK	(Mexico) Luis Malagón	América
DF	(Brazil) Luan Garcia	Toluca
DF	(Uruguay) Ignacio Rivero	Cruz Azul
DF	(Uruguay) Federico Pereira	Toluca
DF	(Mexico) Jesús Gallardo	Toluca
MF	(Spain) Álvaro Fidalgo	América
MF	(Mexico) Marcel Ruiz	Toluca
MF	(Argentina) Juan Brunetta	Tigres UANL
FW	(Mexico) Alexis Vega	Toluca
FW	(Portugal) Paulinho	Toluca
FW	(Colombia) Diber Cambindo	Necaxa
Manager: (Argentina) Antonio Mohamed (Toluca)

- Most Valuable Player

=== Annual awards ===
Category	Recipient	Club	Ref.
Best Attacking Midfielder	(Mexico) Alexis Vega	Toluca	
Best Goalkeeper	(Colombia) Kevin Mier	Cruz Azul	
Best Center-back	(Colombia) Willer Ditta	Cruz Azul	
Best Full-back	(Mexico) Jesús Gallardo	Toluca	
Best Defensive Midfielder	(Argentina) Agustín Palavecino	Necaxa	
Best Liga de Expansión MX Player	(Mexico) Jesús Ocejo	UdeG	
Best Rookie	(Mexico) Hugo Camberos	Guadalajara	
Best Forward	(Portugal) Paulinho	Toluca	
Best Manager	(Brazil) André Jardine	América	
Balón de Oro	(Portugal) Paulinho	Toluca	
Goal of the Year	(Mexico) Alexis Vega	Toluca	
