= Frank Lippmann =

German former footballer (born 1961)

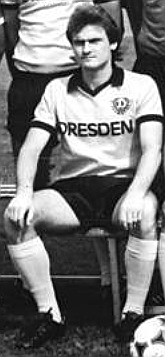
- Lippmann in 1986

Personal information
- Date of birth: 23 April 1961 (age 65)
- Place of birth: Dresden, East Germany
- Position: Forward

Youth career
- –1979: TSG Blau-Weiß Zschachwitz

Senior career*
Years	Team	Apps	(Gls)
1979–1986	Dynamo Dresden	89	(9)
1987	1. FC Nürnberg	6	(0)
1987–1988	Waldhof Mannheim	16	(1)
1988–1989	LASK Linz		
1989–1990	Vorwärts Steyr		
1990	SC Zug		
1990–1993	Dresdner SC		

Managerial career
- 2009–2010: SV Pirna-Süd
- * Club domestic league appearances and goals

Frank Lippmann (born 23 April 1961) is a German former footballer who played as a forward. He defected from East Germany to West Germany after playing for Dynamo Dresden against Bayer Uerdingen in a 1986 UEFA Cup match.

== See also ==
- List of Soviet and Eastern Bloc defectors
