= Thomas Lundmark =

Swedish footballer (born 1963)

Personal information
- Date of birth: 28 June 1963 (age 63)
- Place of birth: Solna, Sweden
- Height: 1.90 m (6 ft 3 in)
- Position: Midfielder

Youth career
- 1972–1973: Spårvägens GoIF
- 1974–1976: Vasalunds IF
- 1977–: IF Brommapojkarna

Senior career*
Years	Team	Apps	(Gls)
–1984	IF Brommapojkarna		
1985–1988	AIK	86	(9)
1989	IFK Eskilstuna		
1990–1993	Djurgårdens IF		
1994–1995	Wigör FK		
1996	FC Café Opera		
2006–	FC Djursholm		
- * Club domestic league appearances and goals

Thomas Lundmark (born 28 June 1963) is a Swedish former professional footballer who played as a midfielder. He made 86 Allsvenskan appearances (9 goals) for AIK and 56 Allsvenskan appearances (6 goals) for Djurgårdens IF.
