= György Handel =

Hungarian footballer (1959–2021)

Personal information
- Full name: György Handel
- Date of birth: 20 March 1959
- Place of birth: Budapest, Hungary
- Date of death: 16 January 2021 (aged 61)
- Place of death: Hungary
- Position: Forward

Youth career
- 1973–1980: Újpesti Dózsa

Senior career*
Years	Team	Apps	(Gls)
1980–1984	MTK–VM	108	(32)
1984–1985	Volán	21	(11)
1985	Siófoki Bányász	10	(4)
1985–1986	Veszprémi SE	21	(17)
1986–1989	Rába ETO Győr	103	(29)
1989–1990	Veszprémi SE	15	(6)
1991	Volán	4	(0)
1991–1993	Luxol St. Andrew's	32	(13)
1993-1994	Nadur Youngsters	16	(14)
1995-1996	Lija Athletic	17	(5)
1996-1997	Qormi	10	(13)
Total		357	(144)

International career
1987	Hungary	1	(0)
- * Club domestic league appearances and goals

György Handel (20 March 1959 – 16 January 2021) was a Hungarian footballer.

He played once for the Hungary national football team. He died on 16 January 2021, from COVID-19 during the COVID-19 pandemic in Hungary.
