= Wiesław Cisek =

Polish footballer (born 1963)

Wieslaw Cisek-
Personal information
- Full name: Wiesław Adam Cisek
- Date of birth: 2 January 1963 (age 63)
- Place of birth: Radymno, Poland
- Height: 1.83 m (6 ft 0 in)
- Position: Midfielder

Senior career*
Years	Team	Apps	(Gls)
–1984	CWKS Resovia		
1984–1985	Legia Warsaw	26	(4)
1985–1994	Widzew Łódź	202+	(10+)
1994–2001	VfB Oldenburg	178+	(16+)
2005–2007	Sawa Sonina		
2007–2010	Arka Albigowa		

International career
1987–1988	Poland	12	(2)
- * Club domestic league appearances and goals

Wieslaw Cisek (born 2 January 1963) is a Polish former professional footballer who played as a midfielder.
