= Dietmar Klinger =

German footballer

Personal information
- Date of birth: 8 January 1958 (age 68)
- Place of birth: Essen, West Germany
- Height: 1.84 m (6 ft 0 in)
- Positions: Midfielder; defender; striker

Senior career*
Years	Team	Apps	(Gls)
1975–1977	Schwarz-Weiß Essen	50	(5)
1978–1983	Rot-Weiss Essen	184	(20)
1983–1991	Bayer Uerdingen	208	(15)
1991–1992	Wuppertaler SV Borussia		
- * Club domestic league appearances and goals

Dietmar Klinger (born 8 January 1958) is a retired German football player.

== Honours ==
- DFB-Pokal winner: 1984–85
