= László Kuti =

Hungarian footballer

Personal information
- Full name: László Kuti
- Date of birth: 23 October 1954 (age 72)
- Place of birth: Székesfehérvár, Hungary
- Position: Forward

Youth career
- –1973: Szabadegyháza

Senior career*
Years	Team	Apps	(Gls)
1973–1976	Videoton	21	(0)
1976–1980	Dunaújváros	91	(30)
1980–1985	Budapest Honvéd	50	(11)
1985–1986	Denizlispor	19	(2)
1988–1990	Marchegg		
Total		181	(41)

International career
1979–1980	Hungary	9	(1)
- * Club domestic league appearances and goals

László Kuti (born 23 October 1954) is a former Hungary international football forward who played for clubs in Hungary, Turkey and Austria.

== Career ==
Born in Székesfehérvár, Kuti started playing youth football for local side Szabadegyháza FC. He turned professional with Videoton FC in 1973. He moved to Dunaújváros FC in 1976 and would spend four seasons with the club. Kuti spent the following five seasons with Budapest Honvéd FC, winning the Hungarian league in the 1984–85 season.

In 1985, Kuti moved to Turkey, joining Süper Lig side Denizlispor. He made 19 league appearances for the club. A brief stint with FC Marchegg in the Austrian regional league followed.

Kuti made nine appearances for the Hungary national football team from 1979 to 1980.
