= Thomas Bergman =

Swedish association footballer

Personal information
- Full name: Thomas Bergman
- Date of birth: 9 February 1960 (age 66)
- Place of birth: Stockholm, Sweden
- Height: 1.82 m (5 ft 11 1/2 in)
- Position: Defender

Senior career*
Years	Team	Apps	(Gls)
1978–1982	IF Brommapojkarna	69	(10)
1982-1989	AIK Fotboll	147	(12)
1989-1994	Vasalunds IF	118	(22)

International career
1983-1984	Sweden	4	(0)
- * Club domestic league appearances and goals

Thomas Bergman (born 9 February 1960) is a Swedish former football player.

During his club career, Bergman played for IF Brommapojkarna, AIK Fotboll, and Vasalunds IF.

Bergman made four appearances for the Sweden men's national football team, between 1983 and 1984.
