= Stanislav Pelc =

Czechoslovak footballer

Personal information
- Date of birth: 31 October 1955 (age 70)
- Place of birth: Skorotice, Czechoslovakia
- Position: Midfielder

Senior career*
Years	Team	Apps	(Gls)
1975–1986	Dukla Prague	240	(63)
1986–1988	EPA Larnaca FC	23	(4)

International career
1982–1985	Czechoslovakia	3	(0)
- * Club domestic league appearances and goals

Stanislav Pelc (born 31 October 1955 in Skorotice, nowadays part of Ústí nad Labem) is a former Czechoslovak footballer.

== Playing career ==
During his youth Stanislav Pelc played for Sokol Skorotice and Spartak Ústí nad Labem. In 1975, he transferred to Dukla Prague, where he stayed until 1986. For Dukla he reached a total of 240 top league appearances and scored 63 goals. In 1977, 1979 and 1982 he won Czechoslovak First League and in 1981, 1983 and 1985 he won national cup. He spent the late years of his career playing in Cyprus for EPA Larnaca FC and in regional Austrian leagues.

For the national team of Czechoslovakia, Pelc played three matches.
