= Marian Bâcu =

Romanian footballer

Personal information
- Full name: Marian Bâcu
- Date of birth: 21 April 1960 (age 66)
- Place of birth: Maglavit, Romania
- Height: 1.79 m (5 ft 10 1/2 in)
- Position: Forward

Youth career
- 1978–1981: Universitatea Craiova

Senior career*
| Years | Team | Apps | (Gls) |
| 1981–1989 | Universitatea Craiova | 170 | (60) |
| 1989–1992 | Jiul Petrosani | 60 | (32) |
| 1992–1994 | Hapoel Be'er Sheva | 80 | (20) |
| Total | | 260 | (112) |

International career
| 1986–1987 | Romania Olympic | 5 | (3) |
- * Club domestic league appearances and goals as of 11 December 2012

Marian Bîcu (born 21 April 1960) is a Romanian former footballer. In the 1985–86 season he scored 25 goals, making him the top goalscorer of Universitatea Craiova and the third goalscorer in Liga I, after Gheorghe Hagi and Victor Piţurcă. In the 1990–91 season he scored 17 goals for Jiul Petrosani, making him the top goalscorer of the team and the second goalscorer in Liga I, after Ovidiu Cornel Hanganu.

== Honours ==
Universitatea Craiova

- Cupa României: 1982–83
