= Iker Fimbres =

Mexican footballer (born 2005)

Personal information
- Full name: Iker Jareth Fimbres Ochoa
- Date of birth: 2 June 2005 (age 21)
- Place of birth: Hermosillo, Sonora, Mexico
- Height: 1.73 m (5 ft 8 in)
- Position: Attacking midfielder

Team information
- Current team: Monterrey
- Number: 11

Youth career
- 2018–2024: Monterrey

Senior career*
Years	Team	Apps	(Gls)
2023–	Monterrey	67	(6)

International career^{‡}
2025	Mexico U20	5	(1)
2026–	Mexico	1	(0)
- * Club domestic league appearances and goals as of 7 November 2026 ‡ National team caps and goals as of 22 May 2026

Iker Jareth Fimbres Ochoa (born 2 June 2005) is a Mexican professional footballer who plays as an attacking midfielder for Liga MX club Monterrey and the Mexico national team.

== Club career ==
=== Monterrey ===
Fimbres began his career at the academy of Monterrey, beginning on their U13 team, progressing through all categories, until making his professional debut in 2024 against Philadelphia Union in the 2023 Leagues Cup.

On 14 July 2024, Fimbres made his Liga MX debut in a 0–4 loss to Cruz Azul, being subbed in at the 70th minute and getting a yellow and on 19 October, he scored a brace in the Clásico Regio against UANL, becoming the team's youngest player to do so.

== International career ==
In 2025, Fimbres was called up by coach Eduardo Arce to represent Mexico at the FIFA U-20 World Cup held in Chile, scoring against the host nation in a 4–1 win.

== Career statistics ==
=== Club ===
As of match played on 7 November 2026

Club	Season	League			Cup		Continental		Global		Other		Total	
Club	Season	Division	Apps	Goals	Apps	Goals	Apps	Goals	Apps	Goals	Apps	Goals	Apps	Goals
Monterrey	2023–24	Liga MX	—		—		—		—		1 (Note: Appearances in Leagues Cup)	0	1	0
Monterrey	2024–25	Liga MX	34	4	—		4 (Note: Appearances in CONCACAF Champions Cup)	0	—		2	0	40	4
Monterrey	2025–26	Liga MX	24	2	—		3	1	1 (Note: Appearances in FIFA Club World Cup)	0	2	0	17	2
Monterrey	2026–27	Liga MX	9	0	—		—		—		3	0	12	0
Career total			67	6	0	0	7	1	1	0	8	0	83	7

=== International ===
As of match played on 22 May 2026

Appearances and goals by national team and year
National team	Year	Apps	Goals
Mexico	2026	1	0
Total		1	0

== Honours ==
Individual

- IFFHS Men's Youth (U20) CONCACAF Best XI: 2025
- Liga MX Goal of the Month: October 2024
- Liga MX All-Star: 2026
