= Pavel Korejčík =

Czech footballer

Personal information
- Date of birth: 10 December 1959 (age 66)
- Place of birth: Komárov, Czechoslovakia
- Position: Forward

Senior career*
Years	Team	Apps	(Gls)
1977–1980	Škoda Plzeň		
1980–1990	Dukla Prague		

International career
1980	Czechoslovakia U21	1	(0)
1987–1988	Czechoslovakia Olympic	6	(0)
- * Club domestic league appearances and goals

Pavel Korejčík (born 10 December 1959) is a retired Czech football player who played in the Czechoslovak First League for Škoda Plzeň and Dukla Prague. He won the league title with Dukla in the 1981–82 season, and amassed 251 league appearances and 88 goals during his career.
