= István Schmidt =

Hungarian footballer (1954–2021)

Personal information
- Date of birth: October 12, 1958
- Place of birth: Budapest, Hungary
- Date of death: August 11, 2005 (aged 46)
- Place of death: Hungary
- Position: Forward

Senior career*
Years	Team	Apps	(Gls)
1975–1977	ÉGSZÖV MEDOSZ		
1977–1989	Tatabányai Miner	290	(51)
1980	→ Ferencvárosi (loan)		
1989–1990	Vasas	13	(3)
1990	Veszprém	1	

International career
1983	Hungary	4	(1)
- * Club domestic league appearances and goals

István Schmidt (October 12, 1958 – August 11, 2005) was a Hungarian footballer. He played as a forward for Tatabányai Miner throughout the late 1970s to the late 1980s. He also briefly represented his home country of Hungary throughout the early 1980s.

== Club career ==
In the summer of 1977 he transferred from ÉGSZÖV MEDOSZ to Tatabánya after playing for the club for two years, being scouted by the club's manager Tivadar Monostori who saw potential in the young striker. He made his debut for Tatabányai Miner during the 1977–78 Nemzeti Bajnokság I on 22 October 1977 against Rába ETO, where he drew 1–1. Between 1977 and 1989 he played 290 league games for Tatabánya and scored 51 goals. He would be a part of the squad that achieved runners-up in the 1980–81 Nemzeti Bajnokság I and would later play in the 1981–82 UEFA Cup against Real Madrid. He was named as the top scorer of the club during the 1978–79 season. He would also be briefly loaned out to play for Ferencvárosi for a series of friendlies.

During the 1989–90 Nemzeti Bajnokság I, he played for Vasas and in the autumn of 1990 for Veszprém. In their last match, their team lost 1–0 to Újpest Dósza. As a coach he worked for the Nemzeti Bajnokság III Nagyigmánd team. He also played a few matches as a defender.

== International career ==
Throughout the early 1980s, Schmidt was called up to represent Hungary for the 1984 Summer Olympics. He would play in four matches and would score a goal in one of them.

== Managerial career ==
Until his death he was the youth coach of Tatabánya Foundation SK. In August 2010, he was commemorated with a football tournament in Nagyigmánd.
