= Francesco Manassero =

Peruvian footballer (born 1964)

Personal information
- Full name: Francesco Paolo Manassero Zegarra
- Date of birth: 12 April 1964 (age 62)
- Place of birth: Lima, Peru
- Height: 1.80 m (5 ft 11 in)
- Position: Midfielder

Senior career*
Years	Team	Apps	(Gls)
1984–1991	Sporting Cristal		
1990	→ La Serena (loan)	9	(1)
1992	Universitario		
1993	Defensor Lima		
1993–1994	Besiktas	2	(0)
1994	Deportivo Pereira		
1995–1997	Deportivo Pesquero		
1998	Juan Aurich	27	(8)
1999	Melgar	0	(0)

International career
1988–1989	Peru	13	(1)
- * Club domestic league appearances and goals

Francesco Paolo Manassero Zegarra (Note: In this Spanish name, the first or paternal surname is Manassero and the second or maternal family name is Zegarra.) (born 12 April 1964), known as Francesco Manassero, is a Peruvian former professional footballer who played as a midfielder.

== Club career ==
Manassero was born in Lima, Peru. He played for clubs in Peru, Chile, Colombia and Turkey.

== International career ==
Manassero played for Peru at the 1989 Copa América in Brazil and earned a total of 13 caps, scoring one goal.

== Honours ==
Sporting Cristal

- Peruvian Primera División: 1988

Universitario

- Peruvian Primera División: 1992
