= Bent Christensen (footballer, born 1963) =

Danish footballer and coach

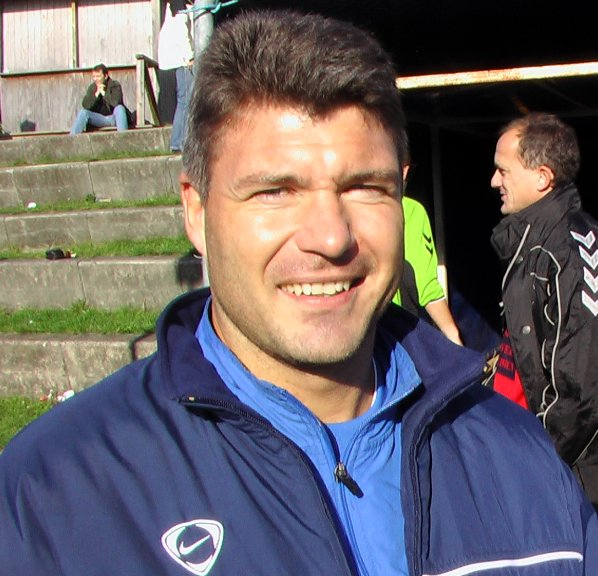
- Head coach at Lyngby.

Personal information
- Full name: Bent Egsmark Christensen
- Date of birth: 2 February 1963 (age 63)
- Place of birth: Værløse, Denmark
- Position: Midfielder

Team information
- Current team: Odder IGF (Head Coach)

Youth career
- Værløse BK

Senior career*
Years	Team	Apps	(Gls)
1980–1989	Lyngby Boldklub		
1990–1996	BSC Young Boys		
1996–1998	Lyngby FC		

International career
1980–1981	Denmark U19	7	(0)
1982–1986	Denmark U21	8	(3)
1988–1989	Denmark	4	(0)

Managerial career
- 2003: Brønshøj Boldklub
- 2003–2005: Lyngby Boldklub
- 2009–2014: B 1903 (FCK II)
- 2017–: Odder IGF
- * Club domestic league appearances and goals

Bent Egsmark Christensen (born 2 February 1963) is a Danish football coach and former player who is the head coach of Odder IGF. In his active career, Christensen played as a midfielder, who spent his career with Værløse BK, Lyngby FC and BSC Young Boys, and played four games for the Denmark national football team.
