= Zdenko Jedvaj =

Bosnian Football Player

Personal information
- Full name: Zdenko Jedvaj
- Date of birth: 13 January 1966 (age 60)
- Place of birth: Mostar, SR Bosnia and Herzegovina, SFR Yugoslavia
- Position: Defender

Senior career*
Years	Team	Apps	(Gls)
1986–1992	Velež Mostar	107	(1)
1992–1994	NK Zagreb	52	(5)
1994–1996	Segesta	30	(2)
1996–1997	Rijeka	17	(1)
1997–1998	DSV Leoben		
1999–2000	Rapid Lienz		
- * Club domestic league appearances and goals

Zdenko Jedvaj (born 13 January 1966) is a retired Bosnian football player who played for several Croatian, Bosnian-Herzegovinian and Austrian clubs. His son Tin Jedvaj plays for Panathinaikos.
