= Luis Padilla (footballer, born 1961) =

Mexican footballer and manager (born 1961)

Personal information
- Full name: Luis Alberto Padilla Velasco
- Date of birth: 17 November 1961 (age 64)
- Place of birth: Guadalajara, Mexico
- Height: 1.83 m (6 ft 0 in)
- Position: Midfielder

Team information
- Current team: Necaxa U-19 (Manager)

Senior career*
Years	Team	Apps	(Gls)
1979–1980	Jalisco	24	(3)
1981–1991	Atlas	147	(20)
1988–1989	UAT	69	(14)

Managerial career
- 1997: Toros Neza (Assistant)
- 2002: Querétaro (Assistant)
- 2010–2013: Club Atlas Reserves and Academy
- 2013–2015: Chiapas F.C. Reserves and Academy
- 2016: Tepic
- 2016–2017: Irapuato
- 2017: Celaya (Interim)
- 2017–2018: Irapuato
- 2020–2021: Colima (Assistant)
- 2021: Xelajú (Assistant)
- 2022–: Necaxa Reserves and Academy
- 2023: Necaxa (Interim)
- 2024: Necaxa (Interim)
- * Club domestic league appearances and goals

Luis Alberto Padilla Velasco (born 17 November 1961) is a Mexican football manager and former player.
