= Canada men's national soccer team results (2020–present) =

- Win Draw Loss

This article provides details of international soccer games played by the Canada men's national soccer team from 2020 to present.

== Results ==
Key
Win
Draw
Defeat

=== 2020 ===
January 7, 2020 Friendly	Canada	4–1	Barbados	Irvine, California, United States
16:30 UTC−8	Ricketts 7'; Akindele 34'; Osorio 45'; Bair 76'	Report	Lashley 35' (pen.)	Stadium: Championship Soccer Stadium; Attendance: 5 Referee: Rubiel Vazquez (United States)

January 10, 2020 Friendly	Canada	4–1	Barbados	Irvine, California, United States
16:30 UTC−8	Brym 10'; Teibert 37'; Đidić 64'; Fraser (yellow card) 73'; Nelson 86'	Report	Jules (yellow card) 45'; Graham (yellow card) 47'; Applewhaite (yellow card) 54'; Lorde (yellow card) 56'; Edwards 70'; Hill (yellow card) 83'; Harris (yellow card) 90'	Stadium: Championship Soccer Stadium; Attendance: 5 Referee: Nima Saghafi (United States)

January 15, 2020 Friendly	Canada	0–1	Iceland	Irvine, California, United States
16:00 UTC−8	Piette (yellow card) 62'	Report	Eyjólfsson 21'	Stadium: Championship Soccer Stadium; Attendance: 20; Referee: Rubiel Vazquez (United States)

=== 2021 ===
March 25, 2021 2022 World Cup qualification R1	Canada	5–1	Bermuda	Orlando, Florida, United States
20:00 UTC−4	Larin 19', 27', 69'; Laryea 53'; Corbeanu 81'	Report	Bather (yellow card) 47'; Crichlow 63'	Stadium: Exploria Stadium; Attendance: 0 Referee: Armando Villarreal (United States)

March 29, 2021 2022 World Cup qualification R1	Cayman Islands	0–11	Canada	Bradenton, Florida, United States
18:00	Rowe (yellow card) 42'; T. Lee (yellow card) 66'	Report	Sturing 6'; Larin 13'; Wotherspoon 25'; Davies 27' (pen.), 73'; Kaye 32', 63', (penalty missed) 72'; Johnston 44'; Cavallini 68', 74', 76'	Stadium: IMG Academy; Attendance: 0 Referee: Ted Unkel (United States)

June 5, 2021 2022 World Cup qualification R1	Aruba	0–7	Canada	Bradenton, Florida, United States
20:00 UTC−4	Pereira (yellow card) 19'; Lewis (yellow card) 69'	Report	Vitória (yellow card) 14'; Cavallini 17', 45+2'; Hoilett 20' (pen.); Brault-Guillard 49'; Davies 78'; Larin 87'; J. David 89'	Stadium: IMG Academy; Attendance: 45; Referee: Marco Ortíz (Mexico)

June 8, 2021 2022 World Cup qualification R1	Canada	4–0	Suriname	Bridgeview, Illinois, United States
20:05 UTC−4	Davies 37', (yellow card) 67'; J. David 59', 73', 77' (pen.)	Report	Haps (yellow card) 20'; Becker (yellow card) 88'	Stadium: Toyota Park; Attendance: 0 Referee: Nima Saghafi (United States)

June 12, 2021 2022 World Cup qualification R2	Haiti	0–1	Canada	Port-au-Prince, Haiti
17:00 UTC−4	Pierrot (yellow card) 2'; Simonsen (yellow card) 40'; Geffrard (yellow card) 86'	Report	Larin 14'; Laryea (yellow card) 45+1'; Kaye (yellow card) 50'	Stadium: Stade Sylvio Cator; Attendance: 0 Referee: John Pitti (Panama)

June 15, 2021 2022 World Cup qualification R2	Canada	3–0 (4–0 agg.)	Haiti	Bridgeview, Illinois, United States
20:05 UTC−5	Henry (yellow card) 7'; Duverger 46' (o.g.); Larin 74'; Hoilett 89', (yellow card) 90+3'	Report	Alceus (yellow card) 42'; Nazon (yellow card) 61'	Stadium: SeatGeek Stadium; Attendance: 0 Referee: Rubiel Vazquez (United States)

July 11, 2021 2021 Gold Cup GS	Canada	4–1	Martinique	Kansas City, Kansas, United States
17:30 UTC−5	Eustáquio (yellow card) 8', (goal) 26'; Larin 16'; Osorio 20'; Kaye (yellow card) 43'; Vitória (yellow card) 49'; Fraser (yellow card) 79'; Cavallini (yellow card) 84'; Corbeanu 89'; Johnston (yellow card) 90+2'	Report	Burner (yellow card) 7'; Rivière 10'; Hérelle (yellow card) 51'; Vitulin (yellow card) 53'	Stadium: Children's Mercy Park; Attendance: 12,664; Referee: Iván Barton (El Salvador)

July 15, 2021 2021 Gold Cup GS	Haiti	1–4	Canada	Kansas City, Kansas, United States
18:30 UTC−5	Pierre (yellow card) 47'; Lambese 56'; Dulysse (red card) 78'	Report	Eustáquio 5', (yellow card) 82'; Larin 51', 74' (pen.); Hoilett 79' (pen.)	Stadium: Children's Mercy Park; Attendance: 7,511; Referee: Juan Gabriel Calderón (Costa Rica)

July 18, 2021 2021 Gold Cup GS	United States	1–0	Canada	Kansas City, Kansas, United States
16:00 UTC−5	Moore 1'	Report		Stadium: Children's Mercy Park; Attendance: 18,467; Referee: Adonai Escobedo (Mexico)

July 25, 2021 2021 Gold Cup QF	Costa Rica	0–2	Canada	Arlington, Texas, United States
18:00 UTC−5		Report	Hoilett 18'; Vitória (yellow card) 31'; Cavallini (yellow card) 38'; Eustáquio 68'; Akindele (yellow card) 83'	Stadium: AT&T Stadium; Attendance: 41,318; Referee: Jair Marrufo (United States)

July 29, 2021 2021 Gold Cup SF	Mexico	2–1	Canada	Houston, Texas, United States
21:15 UTC−5	Pineda 45+2' (pen.); Salcedo (penalty missed) 66'; Gutiérrez (yellow card) 67'; Gallardo (yellow card) 79'; Funes Mori (yellow card) 90+7'; Herrera 90+9'	Report	Henry (yellow card) 45'; Buchanan (yellow card) 49', (goal) 57'; Hoilett (yellow card) 49'; Crépeau (yellow card) 90+12'; Eustáquio (yellow card) 90+12'	Stadium: NRG Stadium; Attendance: 70,304; Referee: Daneon Parchment (Jamaica)

September 2, 2021 2022 World Cup qualification R3	Canada	1–1	Honduras	Toronto, Ontario
20:05 UTC−4	Vitória (yellow card) 62'; Larin 66' (pen.)	Report	A. López 40' (pen.); Rivas (yellow card) 45+2'; Pineda (yellow card) 80'	Stadium: BMO Field; Attendance: 14,822; Referee: Fernando Guerrero (Mexico)

September 5, 2021 2022 World Cup qualification R3	United States	1–1	Canada	Nashville, Tennessee, United States
19:00 UTC−5	Siebatcheu (yellow card) 29'; Brooks (yellow card) 32'; Aaronson 55'; Adams (yellow card) 69'	Report	Laryea (yellow card) 28'; Larin 62'; Kaye (yellow card) 68'	Stadium: Nissan Stadium; Attendance: 43,028; Referee: Oshane Nation (Jamaica)

September 8, 2021 2022 World Cup qualification R3	Canada	3–0	El Salvador	Toronto, Ontario
19:30 UTC−4	Hutchinson 6'; J. David 11'; Buchanan (yellow card) 18', (goal) 59'; Adekugbe (yellow card) 73'	Report	A. Larín (yellow card) 33'	Stadium: BMO Field; Attendance: 15,000; Referee: Ricardo Montero (Costa Rica)

October 7, 2021 2022 World Cup qualification R3	Mexico	1–1	Canada	Mexico City, Mexico
20:40 UTC−5	Sánchez 21'; Corona (yellow card) 57'	Report	Osorio 42'; Eustáquio (yellow card) 55'; Laryea (yellow card) 57'; Buchanan (yellow card) 68'; Vitória (yellow card) 83'	Stadium: Estadio Azteca; Attendance: 0 Referee: Ismael Cornejo (El Salvador)

October 10, 2021 2022 World Cup qualification R3	Jamaica	0–0	Canada	Kingston, Jamaica
17:00 UTC−5	Fisher (yellow card) 7'; Watson (yellow card) 16'; Roofe (yellow card) 47'; Gray (yellow card) 80'	Report	Piette (yellow card) 21'	Stadium: Independence Park; Attendance: 0 Referee: Keylor Herrera (Costa Rica)

October 13, 2021 2022 World Cup qualification R3	Canada	4–1	Panama	Toronto, Ontario
19:30 UTC−4	Murillo 28' (o.g.); Davies 66'; Buchanan 71'; J. David 78'; Brym (yellow card) 90+4'	Report	Blackburn 5'; Davis (yellow card) 26'; Murillo (yellow card) 31'; Cooper (yellow card) 54'; Godoy (yellow card) 90+5'	Stadium: BMO Field; Attendance: 26,622; Referee: Armando Villarreal (United States)

November 12, 2021 2022 World Cup qualification R3	Canada	1–0	Costa Rica	Edmonton, Alberta
19:05 UTC−7	Laryea (yellow card) 18'; Vitória (yellow card) 34'; J. David 57'	Report	Bennette (yellow card) 23'; Blanco (yellow card) 71'	Stadium: Commonwealth Stadium; Attendance: 48,806; Referee: Ismail Elfath (United States)

November 16, 2021 2022 World Cup qualification R3	Canada	2–1	Mexico	Edmonton, Alberta
19:05 UTC−7	Henry (yellow card) 13'; Larin 45+2', 52'	Report	Lozano (yellow card) 14'; Herrera 90'; Araujo (yellow card) 90+8'	Stadium: Commonwealth Stadium; Attendance: 44,212; Referee: Mario Escobar (Guatemala)
Note: Managers Gerardo Martino (Mexico) and John Herdman (Canada) were cautioned (yellow card) in the 32nd minute.

=== 2022 ===
January 27, 2022 2022 World Cup qualification R3	Honduras	0–2	Canada	San Pedro Sula, Honduras
19:05 UTC−6	Mejía (yellow card) 29'; D. Rodríguez (yellow card) 60'; Quaye (yellow card) 68'	Report	Maldonado 10' (o.g.); Fraser (yellow card) 45+1'; Hutchinson (yellow card) 62'; J. David 73'; Cavallini (yellow card) 84'	Stadium: Estadio Olímpico Metropolitano; Attendance: 10,000; Referee: Daneon Parchment (Jamaica)

January 30, 2022 2022 World Cup qualification R3	Canada	2–0	United States	Hamilton, Ontario
15:05 UTC−5	Larin 7'; Vitória (yellow card) 31'; Buchanan (yellow card) 88'; Adekugbe 90+5'	Report		Stadium: Tim Hortons Field; Attendance: 12,000; Referee: César Ramos (Mexico)

February 2, 2022 2022 World Cup qualification R3	El Salvador	0–2	Canada	San Salvador, El Salvador
20:00 UTC−6	Domínguez (yellow card) 18'; Roldan (yellow card) 37'	Report	Henry (yellow card) 29'; Hutchinson 66'; Adekugbe (yellow card) 90'; J. David 90+3'	Stadium: Estadio Cuscatlán; Attendance: 9,000; Referee: Armando Villarreal (United States)

March 24, 2022 2022 World Cup qualification R3	Costa Rica	1–0	Canada	San José, Costa Rica
20:05 UTC−6	Venegas (yellow card) 35'; C. Borges 45+1'; Matarrita (yellow card) 54'	Report	Kaye (yellow card) 15' (yellow-red card) 34'	Stadium: Estadio Nacional; Attendance: 34,000; Referee: Saíd Martínez (Honduras)

March 27, 2022 2022 World Cup qualification R3	Canada	4–0	Jamaica	Toronto, Ontario
16:05 UTC−4	Larin 13'; Buchanan 44'; Hoilett 82'; Mariappa 88' (o.g.)	Report	Brown (yellow card) 43'	Stadium: BMO Field; Attendance: 29,122; Referee: Fernando Guerrero (Mexico)

March 30, 2022 2022 World Cup qualification R3	Panama	1–0	Canada	Panama City, Panama
20:05 UTC−5	Davis (yellow card) 15'; Martínez (yellow card) 47'; Torres 49'; Cummings (yellow card) 57'; Carrasquilla (yellow card) 89'; Rodríguez (yellow card) 90+5'; Mejía (yellow card) 90+7'	Report	Cavallini (yellow card) 16'; Osorio (yellow card) 89'	Stadium: Estadio Rommel Fernández; Attendance: 8,000; Referee: Jair Marrufo (United States)

June 5, 2022 Friendly	Canada	Cancelled	Iran	Vancouver, British Columbia
16:00 UTC−7		Report		Stadium: BC Place
Note: The match was cancelled amid criticism over concerns related to having Iran as the opposing team due to their involvement in the shootdown of Ukraine International Airlines Flight 752 two years prior, which resulted in the death of 85 Canadian citizens and permanent residents. The friendly against Panama was scheduled as a replacement, before it too was cancelled.

June 5, 2022 Friendly	Canada	Cancelled	Panama	Vancouver, British Columbia
16:00 UTC−7		Report		Stadium: BC Place
Note: The match was cancelled due to a pay dispute between the team's players and its governing body, the Canadian Soccer Association.

June 9, 2022 2022–23 Nations League A	Canada	4–0	Curaçao	Vancouver, British Columbia
19:30 UTC−7	Davies 27' (pen.), 71'; Vitória 42'; Cavallini 85'	Report		Stadium: BC Place; Attendance: 17,216; Referee: Nima Saghafi (United States)

June 13, 2022 2022–23 Nations League A	Honduras	2–1	Canada	San Pedro Sula, Honduras
20:00 UTC−6	López 13'; Flores (yellow card) 59'; Quioto (yellow card) 65'; Arriaga 78'	Report	Vitória (yellow card) 5'; Johnston (yellow card) 31' (yellow-red card) 90+4'; Hoilett (yellow card) 40'; J. David 86', (yellow card) 90+7'; Larin (yellow card) 90+5'; Borjan (yellow card) 90+5'; Henry (yellow card) 90+6'	Stadium: Estadio Olímpico Metropolitano; Referee: Mario Escobar (Guatemala)

September 23, 2022 Friendly	Canada	2–0	Qatar	Vienna, Austria
19:00 UTC+2	Larin 4'; J. David 13'; Vitória (yellow card) 16'	Report		Stadium: Franz Horr Stadium; Referee: Manuel Schüttengruber (Austria)

September 27, 2022 Friendly	Canada	0–2	Uruguay	Bratislava, Slovakia
18:00 UTC+2	Koné (yellow card) 89'	Report	De la Cruz 6'; Núñez 34'; Olivera (yellow card) 60'	Stadium: Tehelné pole Referee: Peter Kralovic (Slovakia)

November 11, 2022 Friendly	Bahrain	2–2	Canada	Isa Town, Bahrain
15:30 UTC+3	Al-Humaidan 13'; Helal 65' (pen.); Al-Shaikh (yellow card) 67'	Report	Koné 6'; Haram 81' (o.g.); Fraser (yellow card) 86'	Stadium: Khalifa Sports City Stadium; Attendance: 1,000; Referee: Abdullah Jamali (Kuwait)

November 17, 2022 Friendly	Canada	2–1	Japan	Dubai, United Arab Emirates
17:40 UTC+4	Johnston (yellow card) 18'; Vitória 21', (yellow card) 56'; Cavallini 90+5' (pen.)	Report	Sōma 9'	Stadium: Al Maktoum Stadium; Referee: Omar Mohamed Al Ali (United Arab Emirates)

November 23, 2022 2022 World Cup GS	Belgium	1–0	Canada	Al Rayyan, Qatar
22:00 UTC+3	Carrasco (yellow card) 9'; Batshuayi 44'; Meunier (yellow card) 54'; Onana (yellow card) 56'	Report	Davies (penalty missed) 11', (yellow card) 81'; Johnston (yellow card) 83'	Stadium: Khalifa International Stadium; Attendance: 40,432; Referee: Janny Sikazwe (Zambia)

November 27, 2022 2022 World Cup GS	Croatia	4–1	Canada	Al Rayyan, Qatar
19:00 UTC+3	Kramarić 36', 70'; Livaja 44'; Lovren (yellow card) 56'; Modrić (yellow card) 85'; Majer 90+4'	Report	Davies 2'; Buchanan (yellow card) 52'; Miller (yellow card) 85'	Stadium: Khalifa International Stadium; Attendance: 44,374; Referee: Andrés Matonte (Uruguay)

December 1, 2022 2022 World Cup GS	Canada	1–2	Morocco	Doha, Qatar
18:00 UTC+3	Hoilett (yellow card) 7'; Osorio (yellow card) 26'; Aguerd 40' (o.g.); Adekugbe (yellow card) 45+2'; Vitória (yellow card) 84'	Report	Ziyech 4'; En-Nesyri 23'	Stadium: Al Thumama Stadium; Attendance: 43,102; Referee: Raphael Claus (Brazil)

=== 2023 ===
March 25, 2023 2022–23 Nations League A	Curaçao	0–2	Canada	Willemstad, Curaçao
21:00 UTC−4	Gaari (yellow card) 13' (yellow-red card) 38'; Antonisse (yellow card) 87'	Report	Laryea (yellow card) 13'; J. David 23'; Larin 43'; Vitória (yellow card) 55'	Stadium: Ergilio Hato Stadium; Attendance: 7,800; Referee: Juan Gabriel Calderón (Costa Rica)

March 28, 2023 2022–23 Nations League A	Canada	4–1	Honduras	Toronto, Ontario
20:00 UTC−4	Larin 8', 11', (penalty missed) 42'; J. David 49'; Johnston (yellow card) 85'; Osorio 86'	Report	Benguche 73'; W. Martínez (yellow card) 84'	Stadium: BMO Field; Attendance: 13,626; Referee: Iván Barton (El Salvador)

June 15, 2023 2023 Nations League SF	Panama	0–2	Canada	Paradise, Nevada, United States
16:00 UTC−7	Blackman (yellow card) 42'; Carrasquilla (yellow card) 63'; Davis (red card) 89'; Godoy (yellow card) 90'	Report	J. David 25'; Davies 70'	Stadium: Allegiant Stadium; Attendance: 65,000; Referee: Juan Gabriel Calderón (Costa Rica)

June 18, 2023 2023 Nations League F	Canada	0–2	United States	Paradise, Nevada, United States
17:30 UTC−7	Kennedy (yellow card) 16'; Laryea (yellow card) 45+4'	Report	Richards 12'; Balogun 34'; Cardoso (yellow card) 80'; Turner (yellow card) 81'	Stadium: Allegiant Stadium; Attendance: 35,000; Referee: Saíd Martínez (Honduras)

June 27, 2023 2023 Gold Cup GS	Canada	2–2	Guadeloupe	Toronto, Ontario
19:00 UTC−4	Cavallini (yellow card) 44', (goal) 49'; Lina 70' (o.g.); Vitória (yellow card) 90+3'	Report	Ambrose 23'; Phaëton (yellow card) 62'; Gravillon (yellow card) 65'; Russell-Rowe 90+3' (o.g.)	Stadium: BMO Field; Attendance: 15,301; Referee: Rubiel Vazquez (United States)

July 1, 2023 2023 Gold Cup GS	Guatemala	0–0	Canada	Houston, Texas, United States
20:30 UTC−5	Mejía (yellow card) 16'	Report	Millar (yellow card) 8'; Miller (yellow card) 10'; McGraw (yellow card) 60'; Bombito (yellow card) 67'; Shaffelburg (yellow card) 90+6'	Stadium: Shell Energy Stadium; Attendance: 19,766; Referee: Marco Ortíz (Mexico)

July 4, 2023 2023 Gold Cup GS	Canada	4–2	Cuba	Houston, Texas, United States
17:30 UTC−5	Hoilett 21' (pen.); Osorio 27'; Nelson 47'; Millar 62'; Zator (yellow card) 89'	Report	Corrales (yellow card) 36'; Paradela 45+4' (pen.); Peñalver (yellow card) 46'; Reyes 89' (pen.)	Stadium: Shell Energy Stadium; Attendance: 20,002; Referee: Keylor Herrera (Costa Rica)

July 9, 2023 2023 Gold Cup QF	United States	2–2 (a.e.t.) (3–2 p)	Canada	Cincinnati, Ohio, United States
19:30 UTC−4	Vázquez 88'; Cowell (yellow card) 96'; Kennedy 114' (o.g.); Miazga (yellow card) 120+1'	Report	Cavallini (yellow card) 42'; McGraw (yellow card) 57'; Miller (yellow card) 58'; Osorio (yellow card) 62'; Vitória 90+3' (pen.); Shaffelburg 109'	Stadium: TQL Stadium; Attendance: 24,979; Referee: Marco Ortíz (Mexico)
	Penalties
	Vázquez (penalty missed); Cowell (penalty scored); Busio (penalty scored); Ferreira (penalty scored)		(penalty missed) Vitória; (penalty missed) Fraser; (penalty scored) Miller; (penalty scored) Russell-Rowe; (penalty missed) Brym

October 13, 2023 Friendly	Japan	4–1	Canada	Niigata, Japan
19:35 UTC+9	Tanaka 2', 49'; Davies 40' (o.g.); Nakamura 42'	Report	J. David (penalty missed) 22'; Johnston (yellow card) 56'; Hoilett 89'	Stadium: Denka Big Swan Stadium; Attendance: 37,125; Referee: Alex King (Australia)

November 18, 2023 2023–24 Nations League QF	Jamaica	1–2	Canada	Kingston, Jamaica
10:30 UTC−5	Nicholson (yellow card) 40', (goal) 56'; Leigh (yellow card) 70'; Bailey (yellow card) 77'	Report	J. David 45+1'; Miller (yellow card) 59'; Eustáquio 86'	Stadium: Independence Park; Referee: Tori Penso (United States)
Note: The match was postponed from its original start time (November 17 at 19:00) due to weather conditions caused by a tropical storm.

November 21, 2023 2023–24 Nations League QF	Canada	2–3 (4–4 (a) agg.)	Jamaica	Toronto, Ontario
19:30 UTC−5	Davies 25'; Koné 69'	Report	Nicholson (yellow card) 54', (goal) 63', 66'; Lowe (yellow card) 57'; De Cordova-Reid 78' (pen.); Gray (yellow card) 83' (yellow-red card) 85'	Stadium: BMO Field; Attendance: 17,588; Referee: César Ramos (Mexico)

=== 2024 ===
March 23, 2024 2024 Copa América qualifying	Canada	2–0	Trinidad and Tobago	Frisco, Texas, United States
15:00 UTC−5	Buchanan (yellow card) 42'; Johnston (yellow card) 45+1'; Larin 61'; Shaffelburg 90+1'	Report	David (yellow card) 5'; Phillips (yellow card) 45+1'	Stadium: Toyota Stadium; Referee: Marco Ortíz (Mexico)

June 6, 2024 Friendly	Netherlands	4–0	Canada	Rotterdam, Netherlands
20:45 UTC+2	Depay 50'; Frimpong 57'; Weghorst 63'; Van Dijk 83'	Report	Bombito (yellow card) 41'	Stadium: De Kuip; Attendance: 36,060; Referee: Rohit Saggi (Norway)

June 9, 2024 Friendly	France	0–0	Canada	Bordeaux, France
21:15 UTC+2	Camavinga (yellow card) 39'	Report	Johnston (yellow card) 36'	Stadium: Matmut Atlantique; Attendance: 40,835; Referee: Fábio Veríssimo (Portugal)

June 20, 2024 2024 Copa América GS	Argentina	2–0	Canada	Atlanta, Georgia, United States
20:00 UTC−4	Alvarez 49'; De Paul (yellow card) 61'; La. Martínez 88'; Lo Celso (yellow card) 90+1'	Report	Koné (yellow card) 81'; Cornelius (yellow card) 90+5'	Stadium: Mercedes-Benz Stadium; Attendance: 70,564; Referee: Jesús Valenzuela (Venezuela)

June 25, 2024 2024 Copa América GS	Peru	0–1	Canada	Kansas City, Kansas, United States
17:00 UTC−5	Araujo (red card) 59'	Report	Laryea (yellow card) 20'; J. David 74'	Stadium: Children's Mercy Park; Attendance: 15,625; Referee: Mario Escobar (Guatemala)

June 29, 2024 2024 Copa América GS	Canada	0–0	Chile	Orlando, Florida, United States
20:00 UTC−4	Bombito (yellow card) 7'; Davies (yellow card) 42'; Johnston (yellow card) 57'; Millar (yellow card) 66'; Oluwaseyi (yellow card) 79'	Report	Suazo (yellow card) 12' (yellow-red card) 27'	Stadium: Exploria Stadium; Attendance: 24,481; Referee: Wilmar Roldán (Colombia)

July 5, 2024 2024 Copa América QF	Venezuela	1–1 (3–4 p)	Canada	Arlington, Texas, United States
20:00 UTC−5	Rondón 65'; Aramburu (yellow card) 90+4'	Report	Shaffelburg 13', (yellow card) 36'; Cornelius (yellow card) 50'	Stadium: AT&T Stadium; Attendance: 51,080; Referee: Wilton Sampaio (Brazil)
	Penalties
	Rondón (penalty scored); Herrera (penalty missed); Rincón (penalty scored); Savarino (penalty missed); Cádiz (penalty scored); Ángel (penalty missed)		(penalty scored) J. David; (penalty missed) Millar; (penalty scored) Bombito; (penalty missed) Eustáquio; (penalty scored) Davies; (penalty scored) Koné

July 9, 2024 2024 Copa América SF	Argentina	2–0	Canada	East Rutherford, New Jersey, United States
20:00 UTC−4	Alvarez 22'; Messi 51'; Molina (yellow card) 88'	Report	J. David (yellow card) 32'; Eustáquio (yellow card) 63'; Koné (yellow card) 79'	Stadium: MetLife Stadium; Attendance: 80,102; Referee: Piero Maza (Chile)

July 13, 2024 2024 Copa América 3rd place	Canada	2–2 (3–4 p)	Uruguay	Charlotte, North Carolina, United States
20:00 UTC−4	De Fougerolles (yellow card) 7'; Koné 22', (yellow card) 78'; Oluwaseyi (yellow card) 63'; J. David 80'; St. Clair (yellow card) 90+'	Report	Bentancur 8', (yellow card) 85'; Viña (yellow card) 26'; Suárez 90+2'	Stadium: Bank of America Stadium; Attendance: 24,386; Referee: Alexis Herrera (Venezuela)
	Penalties
	J. David (penalty scored); Bombito (penalty scored); Koné (penalty missed); Choinière (penalty scored); Davies (penalty missed)		(penalty scored) Valverde; (penalty scored) Bentancur; (penalty scored) De Arrascaeta; (penalty scored) Suárez

September 7, 2024 Friendly	United States	1–2	Canada	Kansas City, Kansas, United States
15:00 UTC−5	De la Torre 66'	Report	Shaffelburg 17'; J. David 58'; Larin (yellow card) 63'	Stadium: Children's Mercy Park; Attendance: 10,523; Referee: Keylor Herrera (Costa Rica)

September 10, 2024 Friendly	Mexico	0–0	Canada	Arlington, Texas, United States
20:00 UTC−5	Araujo (yellow card) 18'; Huerta (yellow card) 26'	Report	Choinière (yellow card) 57'; Laryea (yellow card) 65'; Sigur (yellow card) 88'	Stadium: AT&T Stadium; Attendance: 32,623; Referee: Victor Rivas (United States)

October 15, 2024 Friendly	Canada	2–1	Panama	Toronto, Ontario
19:30 UTC−4	Eustáquio (yellow card) 35'; Larin 44'; Choinière (yellow card) 51'; Cornelius (yellow card) 80'; J. David 87'	Report	Ayarza (yellow card) 11'; Bárcenas (yellow card) 41'; Góndola (yellow card) 58'; Fajardo 69', (yellow card) 70'	Stadium: BMO Field; Attendance: 23,315; Referee: Tori Penso (United States)

November 15, 2024 2024–25 Nations League QF	Suriname	0–1	Canada	Paramaribo, Suriname
20:30 UTC−3	Pinas (yellow card) 34'; Abena (yellow card) 37'; Pherai (yellow card) 90+2'	Report	Johnston (yellow card) 48'; Waterman (yellow card) 54'; Hoilett 82'; Osorio (yellow card) 90+4'	Stadium: Dr. Ir. Franklin Essed Stadion; Attendance: 3,500; Referee: Oshane Nation (Jamaica)

November 19, 2024 2024–25 Nations League QF	Canada	3–0 (4–0 agg.)	Suriname	Toronto, Ontario
19:30 UTC−5	J. David 23'; Shaffelburg 30', 67'	Report	Vaessen (yellow card) 28'	Stadium: BMO Field; Attendance: 13,239; Referee: Katia García (Mexico)

=== 2025 ===
March 20, 2025 2025 Nations League SF	Canada	0–2	Mexico	Inglewood, California, United States
19:30 UTC−7	Bombito (yellow card) 18'; Davies (yellow card) 22'; Johnston (yellow card) 33'	Report	Jiménez 1', 75'; Vega (yellow card) 27'; Vásquez (yellow card) 43'; Reyes (yellow card) 71'	Stadium: SoFi Stadium; Attendance: 50,295; Referee: Saíd Martínez (Honduras)

March 23, 2025 2025 Nations League 3rd place	Canada	2–1	United States	Inglewood, California, United States
15:00 UTC−7	Oluwaseyi 27'; Bombito (yellow card) 43'; J. David 59'; Koné (yellow card) 67'	Report	Scally (yellow card) 30'; Agyemang 35'; Reyna (yellow card) 90+6'	Stadium: SoFi Stadium; Referee: Katia García (Mexico)

June 7, 2025 2025 Canadian Shield	Canada	4–2	Ukraine	Toronto, Ontario
15:30 UTC−4	J. David 4', 24'; P. David 31'; Nelson (yellow card) 68'; Buchanan 81'	Report	Zabarnyi 89'; Zinchenko 90+2' (pen.)	Stadium: BMO Field; Attendance: 20,145; Referee: Josué Ugalde (Costa Rica)

June 10, 2025 2025 Canadian Shield	Canada	0–0 (4–5 p)	Ivory Coast	Toronto, Ontario
20:30 UTC−4	Adekugbe (yellow card) 19'; Waterman (yellow card) 31'; Cornelius (yellow card) 48'; Koné (yellow card) 59'; Nelson (yellow card) 72'	Report	Kessié (yellow card) 61'; Guiagon (yellow card) 69'; Sangaré (yellow card) 71'; Singo (yellow card) 89'	Stadium: BMO Field; Attendance: 18,489; Referee: Filip Dujic (Canada)
	Penalties
	J. David (penalty scored); Choinière (penalty scored); Cornelius (penalty scored); Oluwaseyi (penalty missed); Koné (penalty scored); De Fougerolles (penalty missed)		(penalty scored) Akpa; (penalty missed) Gbane; (penalty scored) Boga; (penalty scored) Latte Lath; (penalty scored) Kessié; (penalty scored) Diomande

June 17, 2025 2025 Gold Cup GS	Canada	6–0	Honduras	Vancouver, British Columbia
19:30 UTC−7	Sigur 27'; Oluwaseyi 45+2'; Buchanan 48', 65'; P. David 75'; Saliba 90'	Report		Stadium: BC Place; Attendance: 24,286; Referee: Mario Escobar (Guatemala)

June 21, 2025 2025 Gold Cup GS	Curaçao	1–1	Canada	Houston, Texas, United States
18:00 UTC−5	L. Bacuna (yellow card) 8'; Floranus (yellow card) 57'; J. Bacuna (yellow card) 71'; Antonisse 90+4'	Report	Saliba 9'; Miller (yellow card) 50'	Stadium: Shell Energy Stadium; Attendance: 20,536; Referee: Juan Gabriel Calderón (Costa Rica)

June 24, 2025 2025 Gold Cup GS	Canada	2–0	El Salvador	Houston, Texas, United States
21:00 UTC−5	De Fougerolles (yellow card) 25'; J. David (penalty missed) 45+6', 53'; Buchanan 56'; P. David (yellow card) 59'	Report	Ortíz (yellow card) 16' (yellow-red card) 35'; Domínguez (yellow card) 20'; Henríquez (red card) 45+9'; Mauricio (yellow card) 58'	Stadium: Shell Energy Stadium; Attendance: 19,417; Referee: Joe Dickerson (United States)

June 29, 2025 2025 Gold Cup QF	Canada	1–1 (5–6 p)	Guatemala	Minneapolis, Minnesota, United States
15:00 UTC−5	J. David 30' (pen.); Shaffelburg (yellow card) 40' (yellow-red card) 45+4'	Report	Rubin (yellow card) 60', (goal) 69'	Stadium: U.S. Bank Stadium; Attendance: 32,289; Referee: Keylor Herrera (Costa Rica)
	Penalties
	P. David (penalty scored); Jebbison (penalty scored); Cornelius (penalty scored); Choinière (penalty scored); Larin (penalty missed); Saliba (penalty scored); De Fougerolles (penalty missed)		(penalty scored) Santis; (penalty scored) Samayoa; (penalty scored) Herrera; (penalty scored) Lom; (penalty missed) Pinto; (penalty scored) Altán; (penalty scored) Morales

September 5, 2025 Friendly	Romania	0–3	Canada	Bucharest, Romania
21:00 UTC+3	Stanciu (yellow card) 59'	Report	J. David 11'; Ahmed 22'; De Fougerolles (yellow card) 43'; Cornelius (yellow card) 51'; Koné (yellow card) 65'; Sigur 77'	Stadium: Arena Națională; Attendance: 29,125; Referee: Lothar D'Hondt (Belgium)

September 9, 2025 Friendly	Wales	0–1	Canada	Swansea, Wales
19:45 UTC+1	Brooks (yellow card) 25'; Wilson (yellow card) 32'; Crew (yellow card) 38'; Norrington-Davies (yellow card) 85'	Report	Laryea (yellow card) 14'; Buchanan (yellow card) 36'; Cornelius 41'; Nelson (yellow card) 89'	Stadium: Swansea.com Stadium; Attendance: 15,024; Referee: Robert Jones (England)

October 10, 2025 Friendly	Canada	0–1	Australia	Montreal, Quebec
19:30 UTC−4	Cornelius (yellow card) 41'; Laryea (yellow card) 90+1'	Report	Toure (yellow card) 41'; Irankunda 71'; O'Neill (yellow card) 90+1'	Stadium: Saputo Stadium; Attendance: 19,619; Referee: Steven Madrigal (Costa Rica)

October 14, 2025 Friendly	Colombia	0–0	Canada	Harrison, New Jersey, United States
20:30 UTC−4		Report	Laryea (yellow card) 11'; Cornelius (yellow card) 45'; Sigur (yellow card) 77'	Stadium: Sports Illustrated Stadium; Referee: Guido Gonzales Jr. (United States)

November 13, 2025 Friendly	Canada	0–0	Ecuador	Toronto, Ontario
19:30 UTC−5	Ahmed (red card) 6'; Buchanan (yellow card) 57'	Report	Hincapié (yellow card) 57'; Mercado (yellow card) 90+2'; Caicedo (yellow card) 90+4'	Stadium: BMO Field; Attendance: 28,740; Referee: Fernando Hernández (Mexico)

November 18, 2025 Friendly	Venezuela	0–2	Canada	Fort Lauderdale, Florida, United States
20:30 UTC−5	Martínez (yellow card) 50' (yellow-red card) 57'; J. Hernández (yellow card) 87'	Report	Koné 23', (red card) 60'; Eustáquio (yellow card) 45'; Choinière (yellow card) 71'; P. David 83', (yellow card) 90+1'; Laryea (yellow card) 88'; Waterman (yellow card) 89'	Stadium: Chase Stadium; Attendance: 4,200; Referee: Rubiel Vazquez (United States)

=== 2026 ===
March 28, 2026 Friendly	Canada	2–2	Iceland	Toronto, Ontario
13:00 UTC−4	J. David 67' (pen.), 76' (pen.); Buchanan (red card) 80'	Report	Óskarsson 9', 21'; Þorsteinsson (yellow card) 35'; Anderson (yellow card) 80'	Stadium: BMO Field; Attendance: 26,328; Referee: Jon Freemon (United States)

March 31, 2026 Friendly	Canada	0–0	Tunisia	Toronto, Ontario
21:00 UTC−4	Oluwaseyi (yellow card) 29'; Waterman (yellow card) 53'; Millar (yellow card) 74'; Hoilett (yellow card) 90+2'	Report	Saad (yellow card) 28'; Ayari (yellow card) 46'	Stadium: BMO Field; Attendance: 22,624; Referee: Keylor Herrera (Costa Rica)
Note: The match was postponed by 90 minutes due to a lightning delay.

June 1, 2026 Friendly	Canada	2–0	Uzbekistan	Edmonton, Alberta
19:00 UTC−6	Millar (yellow card) 40'; Cornelius (yellow card) 43'; Osorio 58'; Nelson 90+1'	Report	Ganiev (yellow card) 2'; Sayfiev (yellow card) 9'	Stadium: Commonwealth Stadium; Attendance: 46,164; Referee: Marco Ortíz (Mexico)

June 5, 2026 Friendly	Canada	1–1	Republic of Ireland	Montreal, Quebec
19:45 UTC−4	O'Brien 23' (o.g.); Cornelius (yellow card) 47'; Larin (yellow card) 57'	Report	Parrott (penalty missed) 60'; Ogbene 60'; McGrath (yellow card) 64'	Stadium: Saputo Stadium; Attendance: 19,619; Referee: Pablo Camacho (Costa Rica)

June 12, 2026 2026 World Cup GS	Canada	1–1	Bosnia and Herzegovina	Toronto, Ontario
15:00 UTC−4	Johnston (yellow card) 11'; De Fougerolles (yellow card) 53'; Larin 78'	Report	Lukić 21', (yellow card) 45+1'; Demirović (yellow card) 44'; Katić (yellow card) 90+3'	Stadium: BMO Field; Attendance: 43,002; Referee: Facundo Torres (Argentina)

June 18, 2026 2026 World Cup GS	Canada	6–0	Qatar	Vancouver, British Columbia
15:00 UTC−7	Cornelius (yellow card) 9'; Larin 16'; J. David 29', 45+3', 90+2'; Saliba 64'; Manai 75' (o.g.)	Report	Ahmed (red card) 33'; Madibo (red card) 51'; Fathy (yellow card) 62'	Stadium: BC Place; Attendance: 52,497; Referee: Cristián Garay (Chile)

June 24, 2026 2026 World Cup GS	Switzerland	2–1	Canada	Vancouver, British Columbia
12:00 UTC−7	Xhaka (yellow card) 32'; Vargas 46'; Manzambi 57'	Report	Larin (yellow card) 32'; P. David 76'; Millar (yellow card) 87'	Stadium: BC Place; Attendance: 52,497; Referee: Ramon Abatti (Brazil)

June 28, 2026 2026 World Cup R32	South Africa	0–1	Canada	Inglewood, California, United States
12:00 UTC−7		Report	Saliba (yellow card) 54'; Sigur (yellow card) 67'; Eustáquio 90+2'	Stadium: SoFi Stadium; Attendance: 69,237; Referee: João Pinheiro (Portugal)

July 4, 2026 2026 World Cup R16	Canada	0–3	Morocco	Houston, Texas, United States
12:00 UTC−5	Laryea (yellow card) 40'; J. David (yellow card) 43'; De Fougerolles (yellow card) 49'; Larin (yellow card) 67'	Report	Halhal (yellow card) 20'; Hakimi (yellow card) 40'; Ounahi (yellow card) 45', (goal) 50', 82'; El Khannouss (yellow card) 45+6'; Rahimi 90+8'	Stadium: NRG Stadium; Attendance: 68,777; Referee: Michael Oliver (England)

September 26, 2026 Friendly	Canada	1–0	Chile	Toronto, Ontario
19:00 UTC−4	J. David 12'; Larin (yellow card) 72'; Knight-Lebel (yellow card) 81'; P. David (yellow card) 90+3'	Report	Suazo (yellow card) 29' (yellow-red card) 49'; Cepeda (red card) 35'	Stadium: BMO Field; Attendance: 23,310; Referee: Marco Ortíz (Mexico)

October 3, 2026 Friendly	Canada	2–0	Peru	Montreal, Quebec
14:00 UTC−4	Shaffelburg 19', 35'; Laryea (yellow card) 90'	Report	Garcés (yellow card) 82'; Lapadula (yellow card) 90'	Stadium: Saputo Stadium; Attendance: 19,619; Referee: Jon Freemon (United States)

October 6, 2026 Friendly	United States	1–0	Canada	Saint Paul, Minnesota, United States
19:00 UTC−5	Ellis 29'; Reyna (yellow card) 41'; Tillman (yellow card) 72'	Report	Oluwaseyi (yellow card) 31'; J. David (yellow card) 58'	Stadium: Allianz Field; Attendance: 19,182; Referee: Steven Madrigal (Costa Rica)

November 13, 2026 2026–27 Nations League QF	Guatemala	2–3	Canada	Guatemala City, Guatemala
20:00 UTC−6	Santis 54'; Rosales (yellow card) 73'; Bolaños (yellow card) 81'; De Fougerolles 90+4' (o.g.); Evans (yellow card) 90+5'	Report	Oluwaseyi 18'; Millar 28'; Sigur (yellow card) 39'; Laryea (yellow card) 44'; J. David 45+2'	Stadium: Estadio Manuel Felipe Carrera; Referee: Iván Barton (El Salvador)

November 16, 2026 2026–27 Nations League QF	Canada	4–1 (7–3 agg.)	Guatemala	Toronto, Ontario
20:00 UTC−5	J. David 39' (pen.); Oluwaseyi 45+1', 62'; Buchanan 53'	Report	Santis 34'; Yanes (yellow card) 38'; J. Morales (yellow card) 77'; Herrera (yellow card) 78'; Escobar (yellow card) 78'	Stadium: BMO Field; Attendance: 17,126; Referee: César Ramos (Mexico)

=== 2027 ===
March 25, 2027 2027 Nations League SF	Canada	v	Panama	Inglewood, California, United States
16:00 UTC−7		Report		Stadium: SoFi Stadium

March 28, 2027 2027 Nations League F or 3rd place	Canada	v	United States or Mexico	Inglewood, California, United States
--:-- UTC−7				Stadium: SoFi Stadium
