= 2023 CONCACAF Gold Cup Group D =

Football competition

Group D of the 2023 CONCACAF Gold Cup took place from June 27 to July 4, 2023. The group consisted of co-host nation Canada, Guatemala, Cuba and Guadeloupe. The top two teams, Guatemala and Canada, advanced to the quarter-finals, while the other two teams were eliminated.

== Standings ==
Pos	Team	Pld	W	D	L	GF	GA	GD	Pts	Qualification
1	Guatemala	3	2	1	0	4	2	+2	7	Advance to knockout stage
2	Canada (H)	3	1	2	0	6	4	+2	5	Advance to knockout stage
3	Guadeloupe	3	1	1	1	8	6	+2	4	
4	Cuba	3	0	0	3	3	9	−6	0	

Source: CONCACAF
Rules for classification: Tiebreakers
(H) Co-host

In the quarter-finals:

- The winners of Group D, Guatemala, advanced to play the runners-up of Group A, Jamaica.
- The runners-up of Group D, Canada, advanced to play the winners of Group A, United States.

== Matches ==
=== Canada vs Guadeloupe ===
The two teams had met twice at the Gold Cup, both in the group stage with one win each; Guadeloupe won 2–1 in 2007 and Canada won 1–0 in 2011. These two matches had also been the only previous meetings between the two teams, considering that Guadeloupe was not a FIFA member.

June 27, 2023
19:00

Canada	2–2	Guadeloupe
Cavallini 49'; Lina 70' (o.g.)	Report	Ambrose 23'; Russell-Rowe 90+3' (o.g.)

BMO Field, Toronto
Attendance: 15,301
Referee: Rubiel Vazquez (United States)

Canada	Guadeloupe

GK	18	Milan Borjan (c)
CB	15	Zac McGraw
CB	5	Steven Vitória	(yellow card) 90+3'
CB	4	Kamal Miller
RWB	22	Richie Laryea		(substituted off) 90'
LWB	11	Liam Millar		(substituted off) 65'
CM	20	Ali Ahmed
CM	14	Moïse Bombito		(substituted off) 64'
CM	21	Jonathan Osorio
CF	9	Lucas Cavallini	(yellow card) 44'	(substituted off) 81'
CF	10	Junior Hoilett		(substituted off) 65'
Substitutions:
MF	3	Liam Fraser		(substituted on) 64'
FW	13	Jacob Shaffelburg		(substituted on) 65'
FW	19	Charles-Andreas Brym		(substituted on) 65'
FW	17	Jacen Russell-Rowe		(substituted on) 81'
DF	6	Dominick Zator		(substituted on) 90'
Manager:
(England) John Herdman

GK	23	Davy Rouyard
RB	2	Mickaël Alphonse (c)
CB	19	Méddy Lina
CB	13	Cédric Avinel
LB	17	Anthony Baron
CM	7	Johan Rotsen
CM	3	Andreaw Gravillon	(yellow card) 65'	(substituted off) 84'
RW	11	Jordan Tell		(substituted off) 70'
AM	15	Jordan Leborgne		(substituted off) 70'
LW	10	Matthias Phaëton	(yellow card) 62'	(substituted off) 84'
CF	9	Thierry Ambrose
Substitutions:
DF	5	Nathanaël Saintini		(substituted on) 70'
MF	8	Ange-Freddy Plumain		(substituted on) 70'
MF	6	Quentin Annette		(substituted on) 84'
FW	21	Luther Archimède		(substituted on) 84'
Manager:
Jocelyn Angloma

Man of the Match:
Thierry Ambrose (Guadeloupe)

Assistant referees:
Corey Parker (United States)
Kyle Atkins (United States)
Fourth official:
Keylor Herrera (Costa Rica)
Video assistant referee:
Jorge Pérez Durán (Mexico)
Assistant video assistant referee:
Erick Miranda (Mexico)

=== Guatemala vs Cuba ===
The two teams had faced each other 16 times previously, but only once in the Gold Cup, Cuba's 1–0 group stage victory in 2015. Their most recent meeting had been a friendly in March 2022 won by Guatemala 1–0.

June 27, 2023
20:45

Guatemala	1–0	Cuba
Lom 48'	Report

DRV PNK Stadium, Fort Lauderdale
Attendance: 13,426
Referee: Oshane Nation (Jamaica)

Guatemala	Cuba

GK	1	Nicholas Hagen
RB	7	Aaron Herrera
CB	4	José Carlos Pinto (c)
CB	3	Nicolás Samayoa	(yellow card) 44'
LB	2	José Ardón	(yellow card) 76'
CM	17	Óscar Castellanos		(substituted off) 77'
CM	8	Rodrigo Saravia	(yellow card) 78'
RW	18	Nathaniel Mendez-Laing		(substituted off) 71'
AM	13	Alejandro Galindo		(substituted off) 77'
LW	6	Carlos Mejía		(substituted off) 71'
CF	9	Rubio Rubin		(substituted off) 10'
Substitutions:
FW	14	Darwin Lom		(substituted on) 10'
FW	11	César Archila		(substituted on) 71'
FW	19	Esteban García		(substituted on) 71'
MF	15	Marlon Sequen		(substituted on) 77'
MF	5	Pedro Altán		(substituted on) 77'
Manager:
(Mexico) Luis Fernando Tena

GK	12	Raiko Arozarena
RB	5	Dariel Morejón		(substituted off) 79'
CB	2	Modesto Méndez
CB	6	Yosel Piedra	(yellow card) 86'
LB	13	Jorge Corrales
CM	15	Yunior Pérez	(yellow card) 56'
CM	14	Neisser Sandó		(substituted off) 57'
CM	7	Willian Pozo-Venta		(substituted off) 57'
RF	23	Luis Paradela	(yellow card) 32'
CF	20	Aldair Ruiz		(substituted off) 68'
LF	10	Arichel Hernández (c)	(yellow card) 65'	(substituted off) 78'
Substitutions:
DF	4	Cavafe	(yellow card) 90+5'	(substituted on) 57'
FW	18	Yasniel Matos		(substituted on) 57'
FW	9	Maikel Reyes		(substituted on) 68'
FW	17	Daniel Díaz		(substituted on) 78'
MF	8	Eduardo Hernández		(substituted on) 79'
Manager:
Pablo Elier Sánchez

Man of the Match:
Darwin Lom (Guatemala)

Assistant referees:
Zachari Zeegelaar (Suriname)
Jassett Kerr-Wilson (Jamaica)
Fourth official:
Randy Encarnación (Dominican Republic)
Video assistant referee:
Ismael Cornejo (El Salvador)
Assistant video assistant referee:
Melissa Borjas (Honduras)

=== Cuba vs Guadeloupe ===
The two teams had met in nine previous matches, but never in the Gold Cup. Both sides met mostly in Caribbean Football Union events (e.g. the Caribbean Cup, until its discontinuation in 2017) as Guadeloupe was not a FIFA member; however, their two most recent meetings took place in the 2022–23 CONCACAF Nations League B, with a home win for each side.

Prior to the match, it was reported that four Cuban players had left their team delegation on the night of June 27, after their match against Guatemala and before flying from Miami to Houston to face Guadeloupe. The four players who defected were Roberney Caballero, Denilson Milanés, Neisser Sandó and Jassael Herrera.

July 1, 2023
19:30 (18:30 UTC-5)

Cuba	1–4	Guadeloupe
A. Hernández 62' (pen.)	Report	Phaëton 13', 43'; Plumain 41'; Baron 50'

Shell Energy Stadium, Houston
Attendance: 19,766
Referee: Iván Barton (El Salvador)

Cuba	Guadeloupe

GK	12	Raiko Arozarena
RB	15	Yunior Pérez
CB	2	Modesto Méndez
CB	4	Cavafe	(yellow card) 62'
LB	13	Jorge Corrales
CM	18	Yasniel Matos		(substituted off) 46'
CM	6	Yosel Piedra
CM	7	Willian Pozo-Venta		(substituted off) 46'
AM	10	Arichel Hernández (c)		(substituted off) 72'
CF	23	Luis Paradela
CF	9	Maikel Reyes		(substituted off) 67'
Substitutions:
MF	8	Eduardo Hernández	(yellow card) 90'	(substituted on) 46'
FW	17	Daniel Díaz		(substituted on) 46'
FW	20	Aldair Ruiz	(red card) 88'	(substituted on) 67'
DF	5	Dariel Morejón		(substituted on) 72'
Manager:
Pablo Elier Sánchez

GK	23	Davy Rouyard
RB	2	Mickaël Alphonse (c)	(yellow card) 86'
CB	19	Méddy Lina	(yellow card) 62'
CB	13	Cédric Avinel		(substituted off) 58'
LB	17	Anthony Baron
CM	18	Steve Solvet
CM	3	Andreaw Gravillon		(substituted off) 58'
RW	11	Jordan Tell		(substituted off) 25'
AM	15	Jordan Leborgne
LW	10	Matthias Phaëton		(substituted off) 70'
CF	9	Thierry Ambrose		(substituted off) 70'
Substitutions:
MF	8	Ange-Freddy Plumain		(substituted on) 25'
DF	5	Nathanaël Saintini		(substituted on) 58'
MF	7	Johan Rotsen		(substituted on) 58'
FW	21	Luther Archimède		(substituted on) 70'
FW	12	Steven Davidas		(substituted on) 70'
Manager:
Jocelyn Angloma

Man of the Match:
Anthony Baron (Guadeloupe)

Assistant referees:
David Morán (El Salvador)
Juan Zumba (El Salvador)
Fourth official:
Fernando Guerrero (Mexico)
Video assistant referee:
Melissa Borjas (Honduras)
Assistant video assistant referee:
Ismael Cornejo (El Salvador)

=== Guatemala vs Canada ===
The two teams had met 14 times previously, but only once in the Gold Cup: a 3–0 quarter-final victory for Canada in 2007. Their most recent meeting had been a friendly in March 2015, won by Canada 1–0.

July 1, 2023
21:30 (20:30 UTC-5)

Guatemala	0–0	Canada
	Report

Shell Energy Stadium, Houston
Attendance: 19,766
Referee: Marco Ortíz (Mexico)

Guatemala	Canada

GK	1	Nicholas Hagen
RB	7	Aaron Herrera
CB	4	José Carlos Pinto (c)
CB	3	Nicolás Samayoa
LB	2	José Ardón
CM	17	Óscar Castellanos		(substituted off) 81'
CM	8	Rodrigo Saravia		(substituted off) 81'
RW	18	Nathaniel Mendez-Laing		(substituted off) 66'
AM	13	Alejandro Galindo		(substituted off) 77'
LW	6	Carlos Mejía	(yellow card) 16'	(substituted off) 66'
CF	14	Darwin Lom
Substitutions:
MF	10	Antonio López		(substituted on) 66'
FW	19	Esteban García		(substituted on) 66'
MF	5	Pedro Altán		(substituted on) 77'
MF	23	Jorge Aparicio		(substituted on) 81'
MF	15	Marlon Sequen		(substituted on) 81'
Manager:
(Mexico) Luis Fernando Tena

GK	18	Milan Borjan (c)
CB	14	Moïse Bombito	(yellow card) 67'
CB	5	Steven Vitória		(substituted off) 80'
CB	4	Kamal Miller	(yellow card) 10'
RWB	22	Richie Laryea
LWB	11	Liam Millar	(yellow card) 8'	(substituted off) 65'
CM	20	Ali Ahmed		(substituted off) 65'
CM	3	Liam Fraser		(substituted off) 46'
CM	21	Jonathan Osorio
CF	9	Lucas Cavallini
CF	10	Junior Hoilett		(substituted off) 65'
Substitutions:
DF	15	Zac McGraw	(yellow card) 60'	(substituted on) 46'
MF	8	David Wotherspoon		(substituted on) 65'
FW	13	Jacob Shaffelburg	(yellow card) 90+6'	(substituted on) 65'
FW	19	Charles-Andreas Brym		(substituted on) 65'
DF	2	Zachary Brault-Guillard		(substituted on) 80'
Manager:
(England) John Herdman

Man of the Match:
Aaron Herrera (Guatemala)

Assistant referees:
Enrique Bustos (Mexico)
Jorge Sánchez (Mexico)
Fourth official:
Reon Radix (Grenada)
Video assistant referee:
Luis Enrique Santander (Mexico)
Assistant video assistant referee:
Shirley Perelló (Honduras)

=== Guadeloupe vs Guatemala ===
The two teams had met only once at the Gold Cup, when Guadaloupe won 10–9 on penalties following a 1–1 draw in regulation time in the 2021 CONCACAF Gold Cup qualification second round. That match was also the first-ever meeting between the two sides, considering that Guadeloupe was not a FIFA member.

July 4, 2023
18:30

Guadeloupe	2–3	Guatemala
Gravillon 27'; Plumain 63' (pen.)	Report	Rubin 39', 70'; Mejía 76'

Red Bull Arena, Harrison
Attendance: 21,531
Referee: Juan Gabriel Calderón (Costa Rica)

Guadeloupe	Guatemala

GK	23	Davy Rouyard	(yellow card) 41'
RB	2	Mickaël Alphonse (c)
CB	19	Méddy Lina		(substituted off) 89'
CB	13	Cédric Avinel
LB	17	Anthony Baron
CM	18	Steve Solvet	(yellow card) 54' (yellow-red card) 90+7'
CM	3	Andreaw Gravillon
RW	8	Ange-Freddy Plumain	(yellow card) 38'	(substituted off) 76'
AM	15	Jordan Leborgne		(substituted off) 71'
LW	10	Matthias Phaëton
CF	9	Thierry Ambrose		(substituted off) 89'
Substitutions:
DF	5	Nathanaël Saintini		(substituted on) 71'
MF	6	Quentin Annette		(substituted on) 76'
FW	21	Luther Archimède		(substituted on) 89'
FW	12	Steven Davidas		(substituted on) 89'
Manager:
Jocelyn Angloma

GK	1	Nicholas Hagen
RB	7	Aaron Herrera
CB	4	José Carlos Pinto (c)	(yellow card) 80'
CB	3	Nicolás Samayoa
LB	2	José Ardón
CM	17	Óscar Castellanos		(substituted off) 46'
CM	8	Rodrigo Saravia	(yellow card) 36'	(substituted off) 46'
RW	18	Nathaniel Mendez-Laing	(yellow card) 90+6'	(substituted off) 78'
AM	13	Alejandro Galindo		(substituted off) 68'
LW	19	Esteban García		(substituted off) 68'
CF	9	Rubio Rubin
Substitutions:
MF	23	Jorge Aparicio		(substituted on) 46'
MF	15	Marlon Sequen		(substituted on) 46'
MF	5	Pedro Altán		(substituted on) 68'
MF	6	Carlos Mejía		(substituted on) 68'
FW	14	Darwin Lom		(substituted on) 78'
Manager:
(Mexico) Luis Fernando Tena

Man of the Match:
Rubio Rubin (Guatemala)

Assistant referees:
Juan Carlos Mora (Costa Rica)
Henri Pupiro (Nicaragua)
Fourth official:
Daneon Parchment (Jamaica)
Video assistant referee:
Benjamín Pineda (Costa Rica)
Assistant video assistant referee:
Ismael Cornejo (El Salvador)

=== Canada vs Cuba ===
The two teams had faced each other 14 times previously, including three Gold Cup group stage matches: a 2–0 victory for Cuba in 2003 and 2–1 and 7–0 wina for Canada in 2005 and 2019, respectively. They also met in a goalless draw during the qualification play-off ahead to the 2000 Gold Cup. Their most recent meeting was in the CONCACAF Nations League A in 2019, won 1–0 by Canada.

July 4, 2023
18:30 (17:30 UTC-5)

Canada	4–2	Cuba
Hoilett 21' (pen.); Osorio 27'; Nelson 47'; Millar 62'	Report	Paradela 45+4' (pen.); Reyes 89' (pen.)

Shell Energy Stadium, Houston
Attendance: 20,002
Referee: Keylor Herrera (Costa Rica)

Canada	Cuba

GK	1	Dayne St. Clair
CB	14	Moïse Bombito		(substituted off) 33'
CB	15	Zac McGraw		(substituted off) 83'
CB	4	Kamal Miller
RWB	22	Richie Laryea
LWB	11	Liam Millar
CM	20	Ali Ahmed		(substituted off) 69'
CM	3	Liam Fraser
CM	21	Jonathan Osorio
CF	9	Lucas Cavallini		(substituted off) 69'
CF	10	Junior Hoilett (c)		(substituted off) 69'
Substitutions:
FW	7	Jayden Nelson		(substituted on) 33'
DF	23	Scott Kennedy		(substituted on) 69'
MF	12	Victor Loturi		(substituted on) 69'
FW	17	Jacen Russell-Rowe		(substituted on) 69'
DF	6	Dominick Zator	(yellow card) 89'	(substituted on) 83'
Manager:
(England) John Herdman

GK	1	Sandy Sánchez		(substituted off) 61'
RB	15	Yunior Pérez
CB	2	Modesto Méndez		(substituted off) 69'
CB	5	Dariel Morejón
LB	13	Jorge Corrales	(yellow card) 36'	(substituted off) 46'
CM	8	Eduardo Hernández
CM	6	Yosel Piedra
CM	7	Willian Pozo-Venta		(substituted off) 73'
RF	23	Luis Paradela
CF	9	Maikel Reyes (c)
LF	18	Yasniel Matos
Substitutions:
DF	3	Mario Peñalver	(yellow card) 77'	(substituted on) 46'
GK	21	Nelson Johnston		(substituted on) 61'
MF	11	Romario Torrez		(substituted on) 69'
FW	17	Daniel Díaz		(substituted on) 73'
Manager:
Pablo Elier Sánchez

Man of the Match:
Jonathan Osorio (Canada)

Assistant referees:
Logan Brown (United States)
Caleb Wales (Trinidad and Tobago)
Fourth official:
Fernando Guerrero (Mexico)
Video assistant referee:
Tim Ford (United States)
Assistant video assistant referee:
Edvin Jurisevic (United States)
