= Alejandro Galindo =

Alejandro Galindo may refer to:

- Alejandro Galindo (footballer), Guatemalan footballer
- Alejandro Galindo (director), Mexican screenwriter and film director
