= Rubio Rubin =

Guatemalan footballer (born 1996)

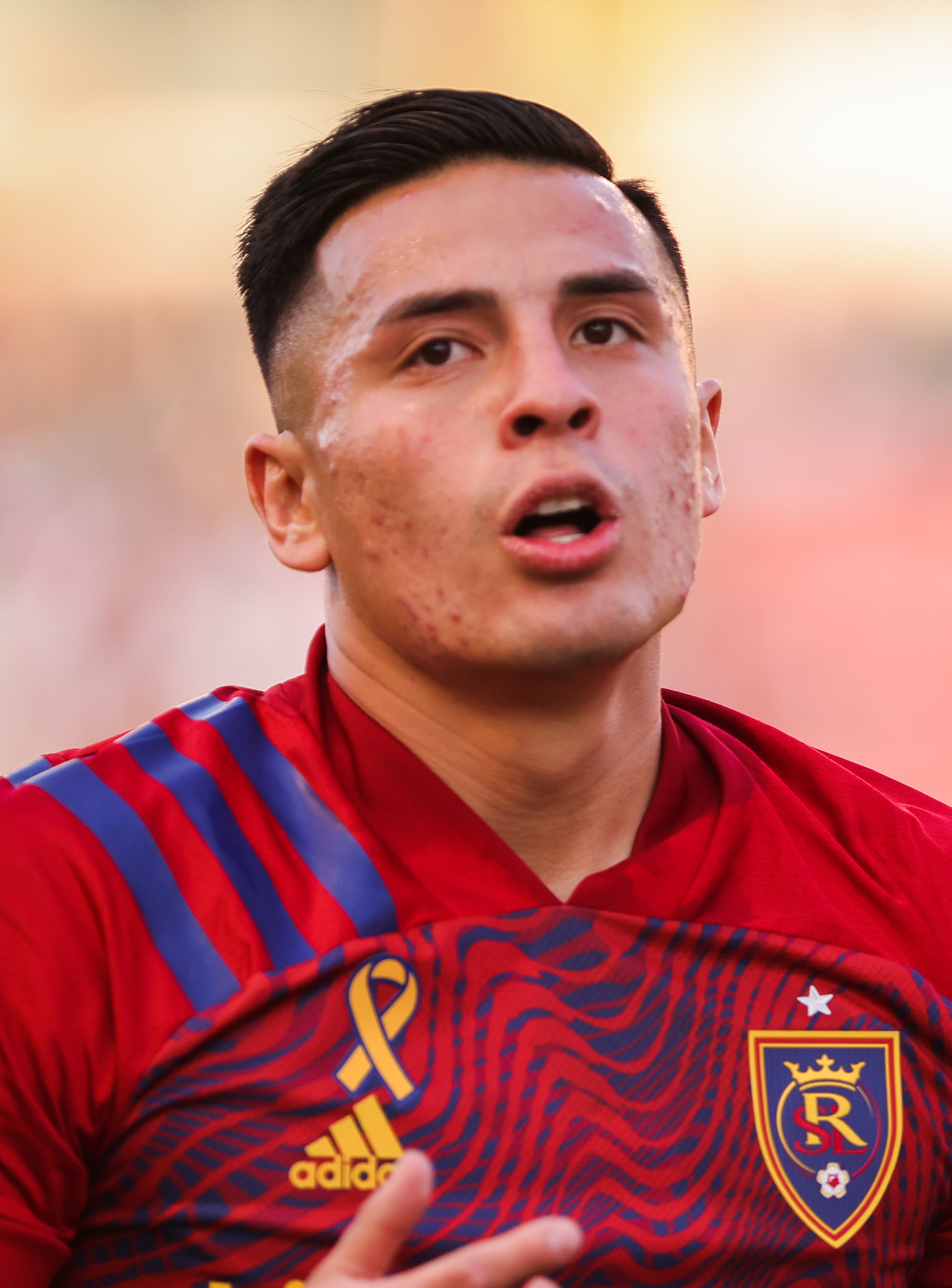
- Rubin with Real Salt Lake in 2021

Personal information
- Full name: Rubio Yovani Méndez Rubin
- Date of birth: 1 March 1996 (age 30)
- Place of birth: Beaverton, Oregon, U.S.
- Height: 5 ft 11 in (1.80 m)
- Position: Forward

Team information
- Current team: El Paso Locomotive
- Number: 14

Youth career
- 2006–2011: Westside Metros
- 2011–2012: IMG Academy
- 2012–2013: Westside Timbers
- 2013–2014: Utrecht

Senior career*
Years	Team	Apps	(Gls)
2014–2017	Utrecht	41	(3)
2016–2017	Jong Utrecht	6	(0)
2017	Silkeborg IF	3	(0)
2017	Stabæk	7	(0)
2018–2020	Tijuana	15	(1)
2019–2020	→ Dorados (loan)	34	(5)
2020	San Diego Loyal	5	(7)
2021–2024	Real Salt Lake	79	(11)
2022	Real Monarchs	1	(0)
2024	→ Querétaro (loan)	16	(3)
2025	Charleston Battery	17	(4)
2026–	El Paso Locomotive	26	(16)

International career^{‡}
2011–2013	United States U17	37	(14)
2014–2015	United States U20	11	(6)
2014–2015	United States U23	3	(0)
2014–2018	United States	7	(0)
2022–	Guatemala	45	(14)
- * Club domestic league appearances and goals as of 21:04, 8 November 2026 (UTC) ‡ National team caps and goals as of 16 November 2026

Rubio Yovani Méndez Rubin (born 1 March 1996) is a professional footballer who plays as a forward and currently plays for El Paso Locomotive in the USL Championship. Born in the United States, he plays for the Guatemala national team.

== Club career ==
=== Youth ===
Born and raised in Beaverton, Oregon, Rubin attended Whitford Middle School. He started his youth career at Westside Metros and played at Beaverton High School.

=== Senior ===
Rubin signed a four-year deal with FC Utrecht upon turning eighteen in March 2014. Rubin started, played the full 90 minutes and recorded an assist in his professional debut for Utrecht on 17 August 2014, in a 2–1 victory over Willem II.

He won the Beloften Eredivisie in 2015–16 with Jong FC Utrecht.

Rubin signed with Silkeborg IF of the Danish Superliga in January 2017 after being released from FC Utrecht.

After his departure from Silkeborg, Rubin signed with Stabæk for the remainder of the 2017 season.

Rubin joined Liga MX side Club Tijuana in February 2018. After mostly playing on loan with Tijuana's affiliate Dorados, Rubin joined San Diego Loyal in September 2020.

On 7 January 2021, Rubin joined MLS side Real Salt Lake. On 7 May 2021, Rubin scored the opening goal against San Jose Earthquakes with a bicycle kick. Salt Lake would go on to lose the game 1–2. The goal was selected as the 2021 MLS Goal of the Year.

On 14 January 2024, Rubin was loaned from Real Salt Lake to Liga MX club Querétaro.

==== Charleston Battery ====
On 24 April 2025, Rubin joined USL Championship side Charleston Battery.

On 12 July 2025, Rubin scored his first goal for Charleston with a header in the 68th minute against New Mexico United in Isotopes Park. It proved the winning goal with the game ending 2–1, which brought Charleston to the top of the USL.

==== El Paso Locomotive FC ====
On 30 December 2025, El Paso Locomotive announced they had signed Rubin to a contract ahead of the 2026 USL Championship season.

== International career ==
=== United States ===
A former United States under-17 player, Rubin in 2012 was named U.S. Soccer Young Male Athlete of the Year.

Rubin was eligible to play for Guatemala, Mexico, or the United States. He joined the United States team for the match against the Czech Republic on 3 September 2014. He earned his first cap when he started on 14 November 2014, in a 2–1 defeat against Colombia, narrowly failing to score a header in the second half and attracting praise from manager Jürgen Klinsmann.

=== Guatemala ===
Following a one-time switch earlier in the year, Rubin made his debut for Guatemala in a 2–0 Nations League defeat to French Guiana on 2 June 2022.

==== 2023–present: Gold Cup heroics ====
In June 2023, Rubin was named to Guatemala's squad for the 2023 CONCACAF Gold Cup. During Guatemala's opening match against Cuba on 28 June 2023, he was fouled and injured in the opening ten minutes in which he was replaced by Guatemala teammate Darwin Lom. He remained in Guatemala's roster and was an unused substitute in Guatemala's second group match, a scoreless draw, against Canada on 1 July.

On 4 July 2023, Rubin returned to Guatemala's starting 11 in the Gold Cup during Group D's third and final group match against Guadeloupe. He scored 2 goals, helping Guatemala secure a 3–2 victory against Guadeloupe and helping the team top the group and move onto the quarterfinals. Guatemala lost 0–1 to Jamaica in the quarterfinals.

In the 2025 CONCACAF Gold Cup, Rubin scored in the last group-stage game to help Guatemala defeat Guadeloupe 3–2 and finish second in the group, advancing them to the knockouts. In the quarterfinal against Canada, Rubin equalized for his side in the 69th minute with a header from a cross by Oscar Santis. Guatemala ended up defeating Canada in penalty kicks, a result which was widely considered an upset. Rubin became Guatemala's all-time top scorer in the Gold Cup, with four goals (two in this tournament and two in 2023). Guatemala was eliminated in a 2–1 loss against the United States in the semi-finals.

== Personal life ==
Rubin was born to a Mexican father and a Guatemalan mother.

== Career statistics ==
=== International ===
As of match played 16 November 2026

National team	Year	Apps	Goals
United States	2014	2	0
United States	2015	1	0
United States	2018	4	0
Total		7	0
Guatemala	2022	6	2
Guatemala	2023	11	4
Guatemala	2024	10	4
Guatemala	2025	14	3
Guatemala	2026	4	1
Total		45	14

=== International goals ===
As of match played 28 September 2026
Scores and results list Guatemala's goal tally first, score column indicates score after each Rubin goal.

List of international goals scored by Rubio Rubin
No.	Date	Venue	Cap	Opponent	Score	Result	Competition	Ref.
1	13 June 2022	Estadio Doroteo Guamuch Flores, Guatemala City, Guatemala	4	Dominican Republic	1–0	2–0	2022–23 CONCACAF Nations League B	
2	13 June 2022	Estadio Doroteo Guamuch Flores, Guatemala City, Guatemala	4	Dominican Republic	2–0	2–0	2022–23 CONCACAF Nations League B	
3	27 March 2023	Estadio Doroteo Guamuch Flores, Guatemala City, Guatemala	8	French Guiana	1–0	4–0	2022–23 CONCACAF Nations League B	
4	4 July 2023	Red Bull Arena, Harrison, United States	12	Guadeloupe	1–1	3–2	2023 CONCACAF Gold Cup	
5	4 July 2023	Red Bull Arena, Harrison, United States	12	Guadeloupe	2–2	3–2	2023 CONCACAF Gold Cup	
6	13 October 2023	Hasely Crawford Stadium, Port of Spain, Trinidad and Tobago	16	Trinidad and Tobago	1–0	2–3	2023–24 CONCACAF Nations League A	
7	26 May 2024	PayPal Park, San Jose, United States	20	Nicaragua	1–0	1–1	Friendly	
8	5 June 2024	Estadio Doroteo Guamuch Flores, Guatemala City, Guatemala	21	Dominica	4–0	6–0	2026 FIFA World Cup qualification	
9	8 June 2024	A. O. Shirley Recreation Ground, Road Town, British Virgin Islands	22	British Virgin Islands	2–0	3–0	2026 FIFA World Cup qualification	
10	5 September 2024	Estadio Doroteo Guamuch Flores, Guatemala City, Guatemala	24	Martinique	1–0	3–1	2024–25 CONCACAF Nations League	
11	25 March 2025	Estadio Cementos Progreso, Guatemala City, Guatemala	30	Guyana	1–0	2–0	2025 CONCACAF Gold Cup qualification	
12	24 June 2025	Shell Energy Stadium, Houston, United States	33	Guadeloupe	3–1	3–2	2025 CONCACAF Gold Cup	
13	29 June 2025	U.S. Bank Stadium, Minneapolis, United States	34	Canada	1–1	1–1 (6–5 p)	2025 CONCACAF Gold Cup	
14	28 September 2026	Estadio Manuel Felipe Carrera, Guatemala City, Guatemala	43	El Salvador	2–0	6–0	2026–27 CONCACAF Nations League A	

== Honours ==
Individual

- MLS Goal of the Year: 2021
- USL Player of the Month: August 2026
