= Carlos Faya =

Venezuelan footballer (born 2002)

Personal information
- Full name: Carlos Enrique Faya Rivero
- Date of birth: 18 January 2002 (age 24)
- Place of birth: Puerto Cabello, Venezuela
- Height: 1.76 m (5 ft 9 in)
- Position: Midfielder

Team information
- Current team: Deportivo La Guaira
- Number: 6

Youth career
- –2020: Academia Puerto Cabello
- 2020: → Fortuna Sittard (loan)
- 2021: Rayo Majadahonda

Senior career*
Years	Team	Apps	(Gls)
2021–2023	México	3	(0)
2023–2024	Rayo Majadahonda	0	(0)
2023–2024	→ Navalcarnero (loan)	23	(1)
2024–2025	Tenerife B	11	(1)
2025–	Deportivo La Guaira	24	(3)

International career^{‡}
2019	Venezuela U17	4	(0)
2023–2024	Venezuela U23	8	(0)
2025–	Venezuela	2	(0)
- * Club domestic league appearances and goals as of 10 March 2026 ‡ National team caps and goals as of 8:45, 26 March 2026 (UTC)

Carlos Enrique Faya Rivero (born 18 January 2002) is a Venezuelan footballer who plays as a midfielder for Deportivo La Guaira and the Venezuela national team.

== Early life ==
Faya was born on 18 January 2002 in Puerto Cabello, Venezuela. A native of Valencia, Venezuela, he started playing football at the age of three.

== Club career ==
In 2020, Faya joined the youth academy of Dutch side Fortuna Sittard. Following his stint there, he signed for Spanish side México FC, where he made three league appearances and scored zero goals.

Two years later, he signed for Spanish side CF Rayo Majadahonda, where he made zero league appearances and scored zero goals, before being sent on loan to Spanish side CDA Navalcarnero, where he made twenty-three league appearances and scored one goal. Ahead of the 2024–25 season, he signed for Spanish side CD Tenerife B, where he made eleven league appearances and scored one goal. One year later, he signed for Venezuelan side Deportivo La Guaira FC.

== International career ==
Faya a Venezuela international. During January and February 2024, he played for the Venezuela national under-23 football team at the 2024 CONMEBOL Pre-Olympic Tournament.

His strong performances in both the Olympic qualifiers and the local league with La Guaira earned him his first call-up to Venezuela. He made his international debut in late 2025, seeing action in international friendlies against teams such as Australia and Canada.

== Style of play ==
Faya plays as a midfielder. Venezuelan news website Se Habla Deportes wrote in that he is a "versatile midfielder... bringing order, balance, defensive aggression, and clarity in the build-up play".

== Career statistics ==
=== International ===
Appearances and goals by national team and year
National team	Year	Apps	Goals
Trinidad and Tobago	2025	10	0
Total		10	0
