= Jorge Aparicio (Guatemalan footballer) =

Guatemalan footballer (born 1992)

Personal information
- Full name: Jorge Eduardo Aparicio Grijalva
- Date of birth: 21 November 1992 (age 33)
- Place of birth: Guatemala City, Guatemala
- Height: 1.76 m (5 ft 9 in)
- Position: Midfielder

Team information
- Current team: Xelajú
- Number: 52

Youth career
- 2005–2013: Comunicaciones

Senior career*
Years	Team	Apps	(Gls)
2011–2018	Comunicaciones	170	(4)
2018	Slaven Belupo	8	(0)
2019	Guastatoya	42	(1)
2020–2024	Comunicaciones	211	(13)
2024–	Xelajú	38	(4)

International career
2014–	Guatemala	48	(1)
- * Club domestic league appearances and goals as of 3 August 2025, 20:00 (UTC)

Jorge Eduardo Aparicio Grijalva (born 21 November 1992) is a Guatemalan professional footballer who plays as a midfielder for Liga Guate club Xelajú.

== Club career ==
=== Comunicaciones ===
Jorge Aparicio grew up in the youth divisions of Comunicaciones in Guatemala before later joining the senior team. From a young age, he demonstrated his potential for a place in the Cremas' first team, but his debut in the Liga Nacional didn't last until 2013, when Iván Sopegno included him in a match against Heredia, in which the Cremas won 3–0.

=== Xelajú ===
After several speculations regarding Aparicio's future at Comunicaciones, on 14 May 2024, it was confirmed that he would join Xelajú.

== International career ==
=== 2014–2015: Beginnings and first CONCACAF Gold Cup ===
He was called up to the Guatemala team for the 2015 CONCACAF Gold Cup; he played in Guatemala's opening game.

=== 2020–2021: Suspension ===
On 12 December 2020, Aparicio, Alejandro Galindo, and Carlos Mejía received a two-year ban from all football activities for attending a private party while on international duty. However, on 27 January 2021, after an investigation made by commission of the National Football Federation of Guatemala, the ban was later shortened to three months, as well as a fine of Q10 thousand.

=== 2023: third CONCACAF Gold Cup ===
On 21 June 2023, Aparicio was called up to the Guatemala squad for the 2023 CONCACAF Gold Cup.

== Career statistics ==
Club	Season	League		Domestic Cup		International		Total	
Club	Season	Apps	Goals	Apps	Goals	Apps	Goals	Apps	Goals
Comunicaciones	2013–14	38	1	—	—	—	—	38	1
Comunicaciones	2014–15	41	2	—	—	3	—	44	2
Comunicaciones	2015–16	43	1	—	—	3	—	44	—
Comunicaciones	2016–17	43	—	—	—	—	—	43	—
Career total		166	4	—	—	6	—	169	3

== International goals ==
No.	Date	Venue	Opponent	Score	Result	Competition
1.	28 September 2026	Estadio Manuel Felipe Carrera, Guatemala City, Guatemala	El Salvador	4–0	6–0	2026–27 CONCACAF Nations League A

== Honours ==
Comunicaciones

- Liga Guate: Clausura 2013, Apertura 2013, Clausura 2014, Apertura 2014, 2015 Clausura, 2022 Clausura, 2023 Apertura
- CONCACAF League: 2021
