= Liam Millar =

Canadian soccer player (born 1999)

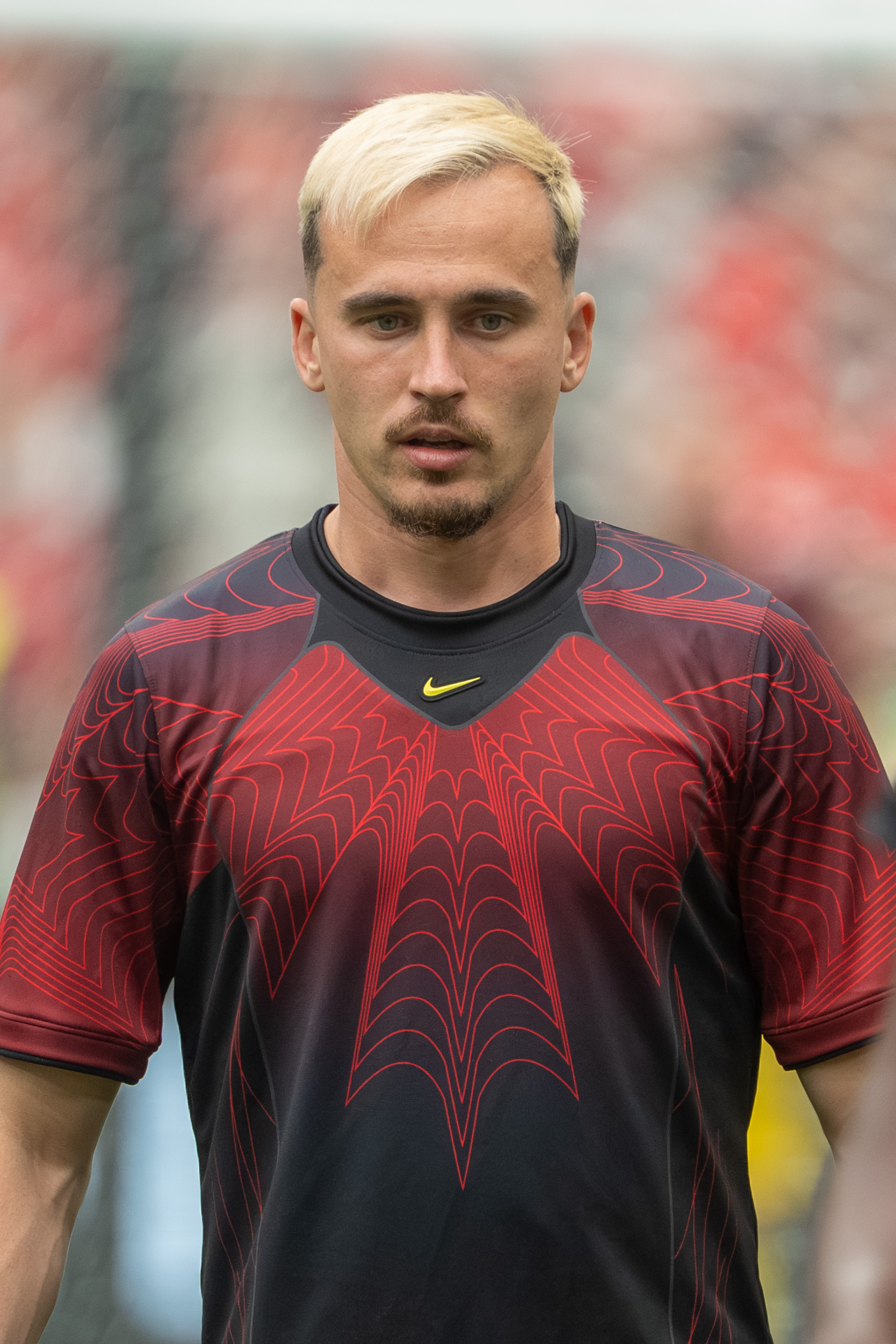
- Millar with Canada in 2026

Personal information
- Full name: Liam Alan Millar
- Date of birth: September 27, 1999 (age 27)
- Place of birth: Toronto, Canada
- Height: 1.76 m (5 ft 9 in)
- Positions: Attacking midfielder; left winger

Team information
- Current team: Birmingham City (on loan from Hull City)
- Number: 17

Youth career
- Brampton SC
- North Mississauga SC
- Burlington SC
- 2013–2016: Fulham
- 2016–2019: Liverpool

Senior career*
Years	Team	Apps	(Gls)
2019–2021	Liverpool	0	(0)
2019–2020	→ Kilmarnock (loan)	33	(2)
2021	→ Charlton Athletic (loan)	27	(2)
2021–2024	Basel	61	(7)
2023–2024	→ Preston North End (loan)	35	(5)
2024–	Hull City	46	(5)
2026–	→ Birmingham City (loan)	11	(4)

International career^{‡}
2017–2018	Canada U20	3	(0)
2018	Canada U21	4	(0)
2018–	Canada	49	(2)
- * Club domestic league appearances and goals as of November 7, 2026 ‡ National team caps and goals as of November 16, 2026

Liam Alan Millar (born September 27, 1999) is a Canadian professional soccer player who plays as an attacking midfielder or left winger for EFL Championship club Birmingham City, on loan from Premier League club Hull City, and the Canada national team. Millar is known for his pace, agility and athleticism.

Millar moved to England to join Fulham Academy aged 13. After three years with Fulham, he joined the Liverpool Academy in 2016. He made one senior appearance for Liverpool in the FA Cup in 2020. In 2021, he joined Basel of the Swiss Super League for a reported fee of £1.3 million. After a loan at Preston North End, he joined Hull City also in the EFL Championship in 2024, and won promotion to the Premier League via the playoffs in 2026.

Millar made his senior international debut for Canada in 2018, before his club debut. He was selected for three CONCACAF Gold Cups, two FIFA World Cups and the 2024 Copa América.

== Early life ==
Millar was born in Toronto, Ontario, and was raised in Brampton and Oakville. He moved to England at the age of 13 for footballing purposes. He began playing soccer at age four with Brampton SC. Afterwards, he played with North Mississauga SC and Burlington SC.

His father played for Charlton Athletic and is an electrician who worked on television series, including Game of Thrones.

== Club career ==
=== Early career ===
Millar began his career with Brampton Youth SC at the age of four. After two years he joined North Mississauga SC and remained at the club until his move to England. He joined Fulham at the age of 13 but felt he struggled to adapt to English football. On moving to England, Millar said "It took me a while to adjust to how English football is, it probably took me a good two-and-a-half years."

=== Liverpool ===
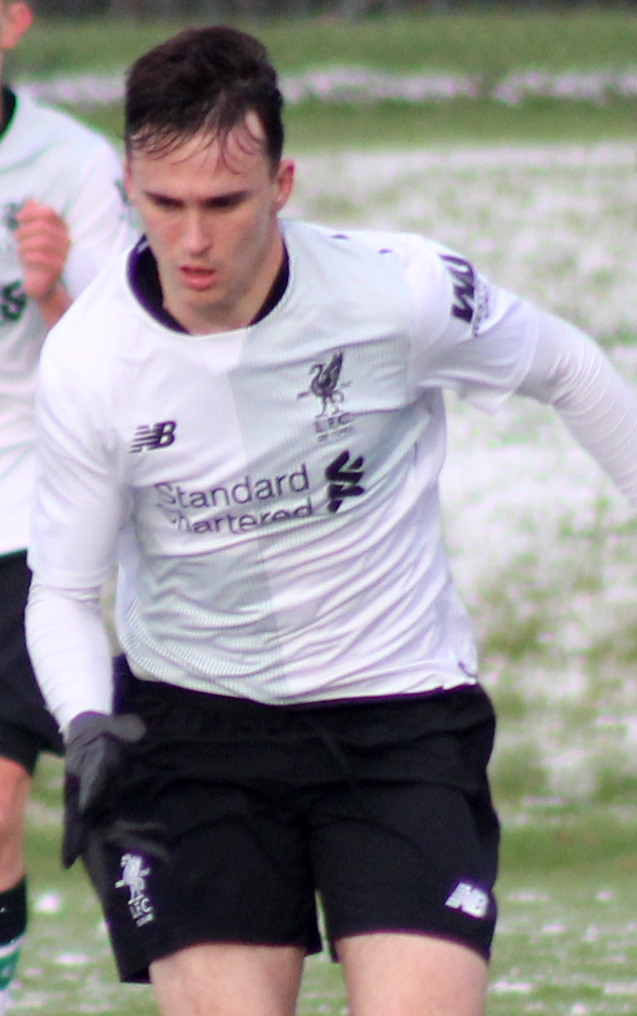
Millar playing for Liverpool youth in 2017.

In July 2016, he joined Premier League club Liverpool on a free transfer with striking options limited in the Academy.

Millar scored four minutes into his Liverpool U18s career and marked his debut in the U18 Premier League with a hat-trick in a 4–0 victory against Blackburn Rovers U18s in August 2016. A month later, he signed a professional contract on his 17th birthday. Injury ruled Millar out for three months of his inaugural season but a return in January saw him finish the season with six goals in 17 appearances in the U18 Premier League.

He featured in every game of Liverpool's 2017–18 UEFA Youth League campaign and scored twice in eight games. After 18 months under the guidance of Steven Gerrard in the Under-18s, Millar received his first call-up to the Under-23 squad in January 2018.

He made his senior Liverpool debut on February 4, 2020, starting in the FA Cup fourth-round replay against Shrewsbury Town. He was replaced by Joe Hardy in the 82nd minute. In mid-2020 Liverpool turned down multiple transfer offers for Millar, who received loan interest from clubs in the Championship and Bundesliga.

==== Loans to Kilmarnock ====
On January 31, 2019, Millar signed a long-term first-team contract with Liverpool and joined Scottish Premiership side Kilmarnock on loan until the end of the 2018–19 season. He made his debut on February 1 in a 2–1 loss to Heart of Midlothian. He scored his first goal on March 11 against St Mirren.

He returned on loan to Kilmarnock in August 2019. This loan period was cut short in January 2020 when he returned to his parent club.

==== Loan to Charlton Athletic ====
On January 5, 2021, Millar completed his move to Charlton Athletic on loan until the end of the season. He scored his first goal for Charlton on January 26 in a 1–0 league win over MK Dons. Over the season he played 27 games for the club scoring two goals.

=== Basel ===
On July 8, 2021, Swiss Super League club Basel announced that they had signed Millar on a four-year deal until June 2025. Liverpool confirmed the transfer the same day. The transfer fee was reported to be £1.3 million, with a negotiated a 20 per cent sell-on clause. Having completed medical checks on Tuesday, he signed his contract and joined the team on Thursday July 8 for their 2021–22 season under head coach Patrick Rahmen.

After playing in two test games, Millar played his domestic league debut for his new club in the away game in the Letzigrund, coming on as substitute for Valentin Stocker in the 72nd minute, as Basel won 2–0 against Grasshopper Club on the opening day of the season on July 25. He scored his first goal for his new team in the Swiss Cup away game on September 19. It was the first goal of the match in the 35th minute as Basel went on to win 3–0 against amateur club FC Rorschach-Goldach. He scored his first league goal the team two weeks later, on September 26, in the home game in the St. Jakob-Park as Basel won 3–1 against Zürich. He scored his first goal in the UEFA Europa Conference League in the away game on November 4. It was the equaliser, in the 57th minute, as Basel played a 1–1 draw against Cyrian team Omonia.

That season Millar played 31 league games, scoring seven goal, three Cup games, scoring one goal and 12 Conference League games with two goals. The team advanced as far as the round of 16 in this competition, but here were eliminated 4–2 on aggregate by Marseille.

In the following league season he played 26 matches, four in the Cup and 16 in the Conference League scoring his sole goal of the entire season against Irish team Crusaders. The team advanced as far as the semi-finals in this competition, but here were eliminated 4–3 on aggregate by Fiorentina.

==== Loan to Preston North End ====
In September 2023 Millar signed with EFL Championship side Preston North End on a loan deal until the end of the season. He made his debut on September 16 against Plymouth Argyle, scoring the second goal in a 2–1 victory at Deepdale. On December 26, he registered a goal and an assist in a 2–1 home win against Leeds United.

=== Hull City ===
==== 2024–25 season ====
On August 9, 2024, Millar returned to the EFL Championship with Hull City. Signing a permanent three-year deal, he arrived for an undisclosed fee. Millar made his debut the next day for the opening game of the 2024–25 season, coming off the bench in a 1–1 home draw with Bristol City. He scored his first goal for the Tigers on October 1, firing home the final goal in a 3–1 away win over Queens Park Rangers. A few weeks later, on October 23, Millar started a home match against Burnley. However, after just 13 minutes he was substituted off having suffered a major tear to his anterior cruciate ligament (ACL). On October 26, he was ruled out for the remainder of the season.

==== 2025–26 season ====
Millar spent 11 months recovering from his injury and regaining his fitness. His eventual return came against his former side Preston on September 30, 2025, replacing Amir Hadžiahmetović at half-time. The Canadian played the final 45 minutes as Hull clawed back a two-goal deficit to draw 2–2 at the MKM Stadium. Millar then scored the opener in a 2–1 home win over Leicester City on October 21, his first goal since his injury. Despite the steady improvements, he was hit with another setback just days later, when he suffered a suspected pulled hamstring in a match against another of his old teams, Charlton, on October 25.

==== 2026–27 season ====
On August 25, 2026, Millar captained Hull in an EFL Cup second-round tie against Stoke City, assisting the equaliser in a 1–1 draw before converting his penalty in the 5–4 shootout victory. Four days later, he scored his first Premier League goal, coming off the bench to net the 82nd-minute winner in a 1–0 away victory over Coventry City.

Three days later on September 1, 2026, Millar joined EFL Championship club Birmingham City on loan.

== International career ==
=== Youth ===
Millar was first involved in the international set-up at the age of 14 in the squad for the Tournoi Montaigu. After being invited to an U20 camp in Costa Rica in 2016, he made his debut in the CONCACAF Under-20 Championship in February 2017. He made three appearances as Canada finished third in Group A and failed to progress to the classification stage. In May 2018, Millar was named to Canada's under-21 squad for the 2018 Toulon Tournament. Millar was named to the Canadian U-23 provisional roster for the 2020 CONCACAF Men's Olympic Qualifying Championship on February 26, 2020.

=== Senior ===
In March 2018, Millar was named in John Herdman's first squad as national team manager. In that same camp, Millar made his senior debut and first start for Canada during a 1–0 win over New Zealand, impressing while doing so. In May 2019, Millar was named to the 23-man squad for the 2019 CONCACAF Gold Cup.

In November 2022, Millar was called-up to Canada's squad for the 2022 FIFA World Cup. He made one appearance at the tournament, in Canada's opening match against Belgium.

In June 2023, Millar was named to the 23-man squad ahead of the 2023 CONCACAF Gold Cup. He scored his first goal for Canada during the tournament on July 4 against Cuba, netting the final tally in an eventual 4–2 victory.

In June 2024, Millar was named to Canada's squad for the 2024 Copa América. In May 2026, Millar was named to Canada's squad for the 2026 FIFA World Cup.

== Style of play ==
Millar's preferred position is as a number nine, but was utilised in various roles with Liverpool due to his flexibility. He has been noted for his ability on the left flank. In August 2016, manager Neil Critchley said: "He's a goalscorer. He can run down the side of defenders, he runs in behind, he gives them real problems with his movement and he's a good finisher off both feet. He's got a good brain, good awareness, very calm and can finish. He's a good player, a good all-round player."

== Personal life ==
Millar is married to Daniela Paniccia, who played for the Penn State Nittany Lions and Oakville Hornets in the Provincial Women's Hockey League. They have three daughters together.

== Career statistics ==
=== Club ===
As of match played November 7, 2026

Appearances and goals by club, season and competition
Club	Season	League			National cup (Note: Includes FA Cup, Scottish Cup, Swiss Cup)		League cup (Note: Includes Scottish League Cup, EFL Cup)		Europe		Other		Total	
Club	Season	Division	Apps	Goals	Apps	Goals	Apps	Goals	Apps	Goals	Apps	Goals	Apps	Goals
Liverpool	2018–19	Premier League	0	0	0	0	0	0	0	0	—		0	0
Liverpool	2019–20	Premier League	0	0	1	0	—		0	0	—		1	0
Liverpool	2020–21	Premier League	0	0	—		0	0	0	0	0	0	0	0
Liverpool	Total		0	0	1	0	0	0	0	0	0	0	1	0
Kilmarnock (loan)	2018–19	Scottish Premiership	13	1	1	0	—		—		—		14	1
Kilmarnock (loan)	2019–20	Scottish Premiership	20	1	—		2	0	—		—		22	1
Kilmarnock (loan)	Total		33	2	1	0	2	0	—		—		36	2
Liverpool U21	2020–21	—			—		—		—		3 (Note: Appearances in EFL Trophy)	2	3	2
Charlton Athletic (loan)	2020–21	League One	27	2	—		—		—		—		27	2
Basel	2021–22	Swiss Super League	31	7	3	1	—		12 (Note: Appearance(s) in UEFA Europa Conference League)	2	—		46	10
Basel	2022–23	Swiss Super League	26	0	4	0	—		16	1	—		46	1
Basel	2023–24	Swiss Super League	4	0	1	2	—		1	0	—		6	2
Basel	Total		61	7	8	3	—		29	3	—		98	13
Preston North End (loan)	2023–24	Championship	35	5	1	0	—		—		—		36	5
Hull City	2024–25	Championship	11	1	0	0	1	0	—		—		12	1
Hull City	2025–26	Championship	33	3	2	0	0	0	—		3 (Note: Appearances in Championship play-offs)	0	38	3
Hull City	2026–27	Premier League	2	1	—		1	0	—		—		3	1
Hull City	Total		46	5	2	0	2	0	—		3	0	53	5
Birmingham City (loan)	2026–27	Championship	11	4	0	0	—		—		—		11	4
Career total			212	26	13	3	4	0	29	3	6	2	265	34

=== International ===
As of match played November 16, 2026

Appearances and goals by national team and year
National team	Year	Apps	Goals
Canada	2018	4	0
Canada	2019	4	0
Canada	2021	6	0
Canada	2022	3	0
Canada	2023	7	1
Canada	2024	11	0
Canada	2025	2	0
Canada	2026	12	1
Total		49	2

Scores and results list Canada's goal tally first, score column indicates score after each Millar goal.

List of international goals scored by Liam Millar
No.	Date	Venue	Cap	Opponent	Score	Result	Competition
1	July 4, 2023	Shell Energy Stadium, Houston, United States	20	Cuba	4–1	4–2	2023 CONCACAF Gold Cup
2	November 13, 2026	Manuel Felipe Carrera Stadium, Guatemala City, Guatemala	48	Guatemala	2–0	3–2	2026–27 CONCACAF Nations League A

== Honours ==
Hull City

- EFL Championship play-offs: 2026
