= Carlos Mejía (footballer, born 1991) =

Guatemalan footballer

Personal information
- Full name: Carlos Anselmo Mejía del Cid
- Date of birth: 13 November 1991 (age 34)
- Place of birth: Cuilapa, Guatemala
- Height: 1.65 m (5 ft 5 in)
- Position: Forward

Team information
- Current team: Chiquimulilla

Senior career*
Years	Team	Apps	(Gls)
2011–2017	Comunicaciones	204	(9)
2017–2018	Petapa	45	(11)
2018–2021	Comunicaciones	56	(7)
2021–2023	Antigua	128	(20)
2024–2025	Comunicaciones	27	(0)
2025	Xelajú	4	(0)
2025–	Chiquimulilla	0	(0)

International career^{‡}
2014–	Guatemala	55	(8)
- * Club domestic league appearances and goals as of 20:00, 25 May 2025 (UTC) ‡ National team caps and goals as of 20:00, 6 September 2024 (UTC)

Carlos Anselmo Mejía del Cid (born 13 November 1991), also known as Cuilapa Mejía or Cuilapa, is a Guatemalan professional footballer who plays as a forward for Liga Primera División club Chiquimulilla and the Guatemala national team.

== Club career ==
=== Xelajú ===
On 8 April 2025, Xelajú confirmed the official signing of Mejía.

=== Chiquimulilla ===
On 5 June, Mejía made a shocking move to Chiquimulilla in the Liga Primera División.

== International career ==
=== 2020–2021: Suspension ===
On 12 December 2020, Mejía, Alejandro Galindo, and Jorge Aparicio received a two-year ban from all football activities for attending a private party while on international duty. However, on 27 January 2021, after an investigation made by commission of the National Football Federation of Guatemala, the ban was later shortened to three months, as well as a fine of Q10 thousand.

=== 2023: second CONCACAF Gold Cup ===
On 21 June 2023, Mejía was called up to the Guatemala squad for the 2023 CONCACAF Gold Cup.

== Career statistics ==
=== International goals ===
Scores and results list Guatemala's goal tally first.

No.	Date	Venue	Opponent	Score	Result	Competition
1.	13 November 2015	Estadio Doroteo Guamuch Flores, Guatemala City, Guatemala	Saint Vincent and the Grenadines	1–2	1–2	2018 FIFA World Cup qualification
2.	8 September 2021	Estadio Pensativo, Antigua, Guatemala	Nicaragua	1–0	2–2	Friendly
3.	24 March 2022	Estadio Pensativo, Antigua, Guatemala	Cuba	1–0	1–0	Friendly
4.	27 March 2022	DRV PNK Stadium, Fort Lauderdale, United States	Haiti	1–1	2–1	Friendly
5.	5 June 2022	Estadio Doroteo Guamuch Flores, Guatemala City, Guatemala	Belize	2–0	2–0	2022–23 CONCACAF Nations League B
6.	15 June 2023	Dignity Health Sports Park, Carson, United States	Costa Rica	1–0	1–0	Friendly
7.	4 July 2023	Red Bull Arena, Harrison, United States	Guadeloupe	3–2	3–2	2023 CONCACAF Gold Cup
8.	7 September 2023	Estadio Doroteo Guamuch Flores, Guatemala City, Guatemala	El Salvador	1–0	2–0	2023-24 CONCACAF Nations League A

== Honours ==
=== Club ===
Comunicaciones

- Liga Nacional: Apertura 2012, Clausura 2013, Apertura 2013, Clausura 2014, Apertura 2014

=== International ===
Guatemala

- Copa Centroamericana runner-up: 2014
