= Pablo Elier Sánchez =

Cuban football manager

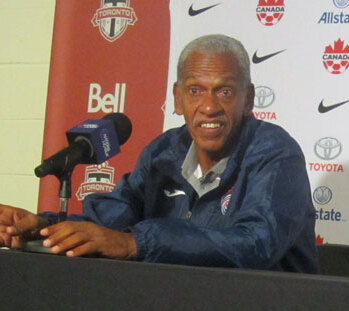
- Sánchez in 2019

Personal information
- Full name: Pablo Elier Sánchez Salgado
- Date of birth: 19 December 1957 (age 68)
- Place of birth: Cuba

Managerial career
- Years: Team
- 2013–2018: Pinar del Río
- 2019–2023: Cuba

Pablo Elier Sánchez Salgado (born 19 December 1957) is a Cuban football manager, who was most recently the manager of Cuba.

== Managerial career ==
From 2013 to 2018, Sánchez was manager of Cuban club Pinar del Río. In July 2019, Sánchez was appointed manager of Cuba after previously being in a physical trainer capacity for the country. In 2023 he was dismissed after finishing bottom in their group after 3 defeats to Guatemala, Guadeloupe and Canada, respectively in the 2023 CONCACAF Gold Cup which Cuba had qualified for after finishing first in the 2022-23 CONCACAF Nations League B.

== Managerial Statistics ==
As of matches played 4 July 2023

Managerial record by team and tenure
Team	From	To	Record								Ref
Team	From	To	G	W	D	L	GF	GA	GD	Win %	Ref
Cuba	July 2019	July 2023	27	11	1	15	32	46	−14	40.74	
Career totals			27	11	1	15	32	46	−14	40.74	
