= Jayden Nelson =

Canadian soccer player (born 2002)

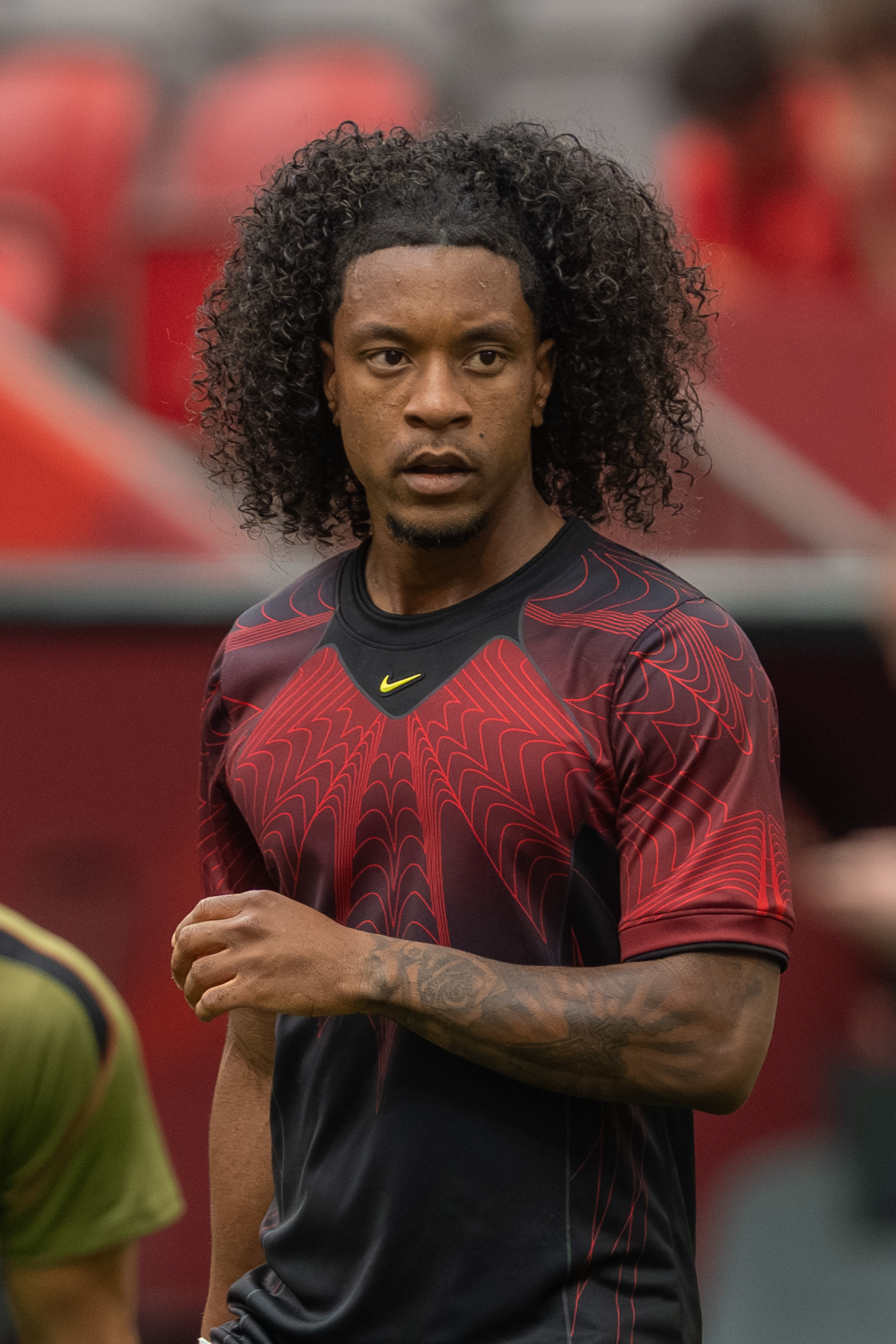
- Nelson with Canada in 2026

Personal information
- Date of birth: September 26, 2002 (age 24)
- Place of birth: Brampton, Ontario, Canada
- Height: 5 ft 7 in (1.70 m)
- Position: Winger

Team information
- Current team: Bolton Wanderers
- Number: 26

Youth career
- –2016: Brampton YSC
- 2016–2018: Toronto FC

Senior career*
Years	Team	Apps	(Gls)
2017–2018	Toronto FC III	8	(1)
2018–2019	Toronto FC II	14	(0)
2020–2022	Toronto FC	45	(1)
2021	→ Toronto FC II (loan)	9	(3)
2023–2025	Rosenborg	35	(5)
2024–2025	→ SSV Ulm (loan)	6	(0)
2025	Vancouver Whitecaps FC	23	(2)
2026	Austin FC	13	(2)
2026–	Bolton Wanderers	6	(0)

International career^{‡}
2017	Canada U15	4	(0)
2019	Canada U17	9	(5)
2026	Canada B	1	(0)
2020–	Canada	15	(3)
- * Club domestic league appearances and goals as of October 10, 2026 ‡ National team caps and goals as of July 4, 2026

Jayden Nelson (born September 26, 2002) is a Canadian professional soccer player who plays as a winger for EFL Championship club Bolton Wanderers and the Canada national team.

== Early life ==
Nelson grew up in Brampton, Ontario and began playing soccer at age four with Brampton YSC. He later joined the Toronto FC Academy at age 14.

== Club career ==
=== Toronto FC ===
Nelson made his debut for Toronto FC III in League1 Ontario on September 2, 2017, in a game against Toronto Skillz FC in his only appearance of the season. The following season, he made seven appearances, scoring his first goal for Toronto FC III on June 17, 2018, against Windsor TFC.

Nelson made his professional debut for Toronto FC II in USL League One on April 6, 2019, coming on as a substitute against Orlando City B.

On January 23, 2020, Nelson signed a Homegrown Player contract with first-team Toronto FC. He made his MLS debut for Toronto during the MLS is Back tournament, starting their round of 16 match against New York City FC. He was loaned to the second team for some matches in 2021. He scored his first professional goal for Toronto FC II on June 16, 2021, against Fort Lauderdale CF.

In December 2021, after the conclusion of the 2021 MLS season, Nelson joined Belgian club Anderlecht for a training stint. He scored his first MLS goal on April 9, 2022, against Real Salt Lake.

=== Rosenborg ===
In February 2023, Toronto announced they had transferred Nelson to Eliteserien side Rosenborg. He made his official debut on April 16 against Molde. Nelson scored his first goal for his new club on June 4 against HamKam, netting the third goal in an eventual 4–0 victory.

Nelson joined 2. Bundesliga club SSV Ulm on loan in August 2024. Ulm also secured an option to sign him permanently.

=== Vancouver Whitecaps ===
On January 24, 2025, Nelson returned to Canada, signing with Major League Soccer side Vancouver Whitecaps FC. The contract is for a transfer through 2028 with an option for the following year. In Nelson's league debut with the Whitecaps, he would get a goal and three assists against the Portland Timbers.

=== Austin FC ===
On December 18, 2025, Austin FC acquired Nelson from the Whitecaps for $700,000 in 2026 GAM, $550,000 in 2027 GAM, and their first round draft pick in the 2026 MLS SuperDraft.

=== Bolton Wanderers ===
On August 26, 2026, Bolton Wanderers announced the signing of Nelson for a fee that could reach £1.64m ($2.34m) on a four-year deal.

== International career ==
=== Youth ===
Nelson attended his first Canadian youth camp in 2016. Nelson made his debut for the Canada national under-15 team in the 2017 CONCACAF Boys' Under-15 Championship on August 13, 2017, against the United States.

Nelson made his debut for the Canada national under-17 team in the 2019 CONCACAF Under-17 Championship on May 2, 2019, against the United States. Against Guatemala in the second game of the group stage, Nelson scored a hat-trick in a 4–2 win. Nelson scored twice more in the tournament – against Curaçao and Costa Rica respectively – as Canada qualified for the FIFA Under-17 World Cup for the first time since 2013. At the end of 2019, Nelson was named the Canadian Men's Youth International Player of the Year.

Nelson was named to the Canadian U-23 provisional roster for the 2020 CONCACAF Men's Olympic Qualifying Championship on February 26, 2020.

=== Senior ===
In January 2020, Nelson was called up to the Canadian senior team ahead of friendlies against Barbados and Iceland. He made his debut on January 7 against Barbados, coming on as a substitute in a 4–1 victory and scored his first goal three days later, also against Barbados.

In June 2023, Nelson was named to Canada's preliminary roster for the 2023 CONCACAF Gold Cup. Initially left off the roster, on June 26 he was called into the final squad along with Liam Fraser as replacements for Sam Adekugbe and Stephen Eustáquio.

On June 9, 2026, Jayden Nelson was called up to Canada's squad for the 2026 FIFA World Cup as a replacement for Marcelo Flores, who was ruled out of the tournament after suffering an anterior cruciate ligament injury (ACL) to his right knee.

== Personal life ==
Jayden was born in Canada and is of Jamaican descent. In 2022, Nelson made a donation to his former elementary school to restart a snack program which had been discontinued.

== Career statistics ==
=== Club ===
As of match played October 10, 2026

Appearances and goals by club, season and competition
Club	Season	League			Playoffs		National cup		Continental		Other		Total	
Club	Season	Division	Apps	Goals	Apps	Goals	Apps	Goals	Apps	Goals	Apps	Goals	Apps	Goals
Toronto FC III	2017	League1 Ontario	1	0	—		—		—		—		1	0
Toronto FC III	2018	League1 Ontario	7	1	—		—		—		2	0	9	1
Toronto FC III	Total		8	1	—		—		—		2	0	10	1
Toronto FC II	2019	USL League One	14	0	—		—		—		—		14	0
Toronto FC II	2021	USL League One	8	3	—		—		—		—		8	3
Toronto FC II	Total		22	3	—		—		—		1	0	22	3
Toronto FC	2020	MLS	7	0	0	0	0	0	—		1 (Note: Appearance in MLS is Back Tournament knockout stage)	0	8	0
Toronto FC	2021	MLS	7	0	—		0	0	0	0	—		7	0
Toronto FC	2022	MLS	31	1	—		4 (Note: Includes appearance in 2020 Canadian Championship final (played in 2022))	0	—		—		35	1
Toronto FC	Total		45	1	0	0	4	0	0	0	1	0	50	1
Rosenborg	2023	Eliteserien	24	4	—		3	0	3	2	—		30	6
Rosenborg	2024	Eliteserien	11	1	—		3	1	0	0	—		14	2
Rosenborg	Total		35	5	0	0	6	1	3	2	—		44	8
SSV Ulm (loan)	2024–25	2. Bundesliga	6	0	—		—		—		—		6	0
Vancouver Whitecaps FC	2025	MLS	23	2	5	0	5	1	7	0	—		40	3
Austin FC	2026	MLS	13	2	0	0	1	0	—		1	0	15	2
Bolton Wanderers	2026–27	EFL Championship	6	0	0	0	0	0	0	0	0	0	6	0
Career total			158	14	5	0	16	2	10	2	4	0	191	18

=== International ===
As of match played July 4, 2026

Appearances and goals by national team and year
National team	Year	Apps	Goals
Canada	2020	3	1
Canada	2021	0	0
Canada	2022	1	0
Canada	2023	1	1
Canada	2024	0	0
Canada	2025	7	0
Canada	2026	3	1
Total		15	3

Scores and results list Canada's goal tally first, score column indicates score after each Nelson goal.

List of international goals scored by Jayden Nelson
No.	Date	Venue	Opponent	Score	Result	Competition
1	January 10, 2020	Championship Soccer Stadium, Irvine, United States	Barbados	4–1	4–1	Friendly
2	July 4, 2023	Shell Energy Stadium, Houston, United States	Cuba	3–1	4–2	2023 CONCACAF Gold Cup
3	June 1, 2026	Commonwealth Stadium, Edmonton, Canada	Uzbekistan	2–0	2–0	Friendly

== Honours ==
Toronto FC

- Canadian Championship: 2020

Vancouver Whitecaps FC

- Canadian Championship: 2025

Individual

- Canadian Youth International Player of the Year: 2019
- Canadian Championship Best Young Canadian Player: 2025
