= Davy Rouyard =

Guadeloupean footballer (born 1999)

Personal information
- Date of birth: 17 August 1999 (age 27)
- Place of birth: Point-à-Pitre, Guadeloupe, France
- Height: 1.94 m (6 ft 4 in)
- Position: Goalkeeper

Team information
- Current team: SC Baie-Mahault

Youth career
- 2014–2018: Bordeaux

Senior career*
Years	Team	Apps	(Gls)
2017–2024	Bordeaux B	48	(0)
2021–2024	Bordeaux	0	(0)
2025–	SC Baie-Mahault		

International career^{‡}
2022–	Guadeloupe	9	(0)
- * Club domestic league appearances and goals as of 15 June 2024 ‡ National team caps and goals as of 21:25, 31 March 2023 (UTC)

Davy Rouyard (born 17 August 1999) is a Guadeloupean footballer who plays as a goalkeeper for Guadeloupe Division of Honour club SC Baie-Mahault and the Guadeloupe national team.

== Career ==
Rouyard joined the youth academy of Bordeaux in 2014, and worked his way up their youth academy. On 1 June 2021, he signed his first professional contract with Bordeaux until June 2025. He made his professional debut for Bordeaux in a 3–0 Coupe de France loss to Brest on 2 January 2022.

== International career ==
Rouyard opted to play for the Guadeloupe national team in June 2022.
