= Johan Rotsen =

Footballer (born 1996)

Personal information
- Date of birth: 11 August 1996 (age 30)
- Place of birth: Paris, France
- Height: 1.72 m (5 ft 8 in)
- Position: Midfielder

Team information
- Current team: Chambly
- Number: 8

Youth career
- –2015: Monaco

Senior career*
| Years | Team | Apps | (Gls) |
| 2013–2016 | Monaco B | 10 | (0) |
| 2017–2019 | Mondeville | 12 | (0) |
| 2019–2022 | Quevilly-Rouen B | 35 | (8) |
| 2020–2022 | Quevilly-Rouen | 15 | (0) |
| 2022–2023 | Sète | 18 | (0) |
| 2024–2025 | FC 93 | 25 | (0) |
| 2025– | Chambly | 11 | (0) |

International career
| 2022–2023 | Guadeloupe | 9 | (0) |
- * Club domestic league appearances and goals as of 04:20, 4 January 2026 (UTC)

Johan Rotsen (born 11 August 1996) is a professional footballer who plays as a midfielder for Championnat National 1 club Chambly. Born in metropolitan France, he played for the Guadeloupe national team.

== Club career ==
On 2 August 2022, Rotsen signed with Sète.

== International career ==
Rotsen opted to represent the Guadeloupe national team in May 2022.

== Personal life ==
Born in metropolitan France, Rotsen has origins in the Antilles; his father is a former footballer from Martinique, and his mother is from Guadeloupe. His younger brother Jessy is also a footballer.
