= Darwin Lom =

Guatemalan footballer

Personal information
- Full name: Darwin Gregorio Lom Moscoso
- Date of birth: 14 July 1997 (age 29)
- Place of birth: Rome, Georgia, United States
- Height: 1.84 m (6 ft 0 in)
- Position: Forward

Team information
- Current team: The Strongest
- Number: 14

College career
Years	Team	Apps	(Gls)
2015–2016	Shorter Hawks	32	(18)
2017–2018	Nova Southeastern Sharks	31	(15)

Senior career*
Years	Team	Apps	(Gls)
2019–2020	Guastatoya	5	(1)
2020	Chattanooga FC	7	(3)
2021	California United Strikers	5	(1)
2021	Hartford Athletic	7	(0)
2022	Malacateco	7	(2)
2022–2023	Xelajú	52	(17)
2024	Mixco	17	(3)
2024	Cartaginés	17	(4)
2025	Comunicaciones	22	(8)
2026–	The Strongest	12	(8)

International career^{‡}
2020–	Guatemala	50	(14)
- * Club domestic league appearances and goals as of 20:00, 20 September 2025 (UTC) ‡ National team caps and goals as of 20:00, 13 July 2026 (UTC)

Darwin Gregorio Lom Moscoso (born 14 July 1997) is a professional footballer who plays as a forward for FBF División Profesional club The Strongest. Born in the United States, he plays for the Guatemala national team.

== Club career ==
=== Chattanooga FC ===
On 10 July 2020, Lom signed a professional contract with American soccer team Chattanooga FC. He had previously played for the team in 2017 while it competed in the National Premier Soccer League.

=== Hartford Athletic ===
On 17 August 2021, he joined USL Championship team Hartford Athletic. He made his debut that day in a 2–1 win vs. Charleston Battery.

=== Malacateco ===
After his stint at Hartford, in 2022 he would sign for Liga Nacional team Malacateco.

=== Comunicaciones ===
==== 2024–25: Debut season ====
On 31 December 2024, Comunicaciones had announced the official signing of Lom.

==== 2025–26 ====
On 20 July 2025, Lom scored his fifth goal for Comunicaciones in a 2–0 win over Mictlán.

== International career ==
On 15 November 2020, Lom scored a brace in a 2–1 victory over Honduras.

== Career statistics ==
=== Club ===
As of match played 19 May 2024

Appearances and goals by club, season and competition
Club	Season	League			Domestic Cup		Continental		Total	
Club	Season	Division	Apps	Goals	Apps	Goals	Apps	Goals	Apps	Goals
Guastatoya	2019–20	Liga Nacional	5	1	0	0	0	0	5	1
Guastatoya	2020–21	Liga Nacional	0	0	0	0	0	0	0	0
Guastatoya	Total		5	1	0	0	0	0	5	1
Hartford Athletic	2021	USL Championship	7	0	0	0	0	0	7	0
Malacateco	2021–22	Liga Nacional	7	2	0	0	0	0	7	2
Xelajú	2022–23	Liga Nacional	38	15	0	0	0	0	38	15
Xelajú	2023–24	Liga Nacional	14	2	0	0	3 (Note: Appearance(s) in 2023 CONCACAF Central American Cup)	0	17	2
Xelajú	Total		52	17	0	0	3	0	55	17
Mixco	2023–24	Liga Nacional	17	3	0	0	0	0	17	3
Career Total			88	23	0	0	3	0	91	23

=== International ===
As of match played 7 June 2026

National team	Year	Apps	Goals
Guatemala	2020	3	2
Guatemala	2021	12	4
Guatemala	2022	3	3
Guatemala	2023	12	2
Guatemala	2024	5	0
Guatemala	2025	12	3
Guatemala	2026	3	0
Total		50	14

Scores and results list Guatemala's goal tally first, score column indicates score after each Lom goal.

List of international goals scored by Darwin Lom
No.	Date	Venue	Opponent	Score	Result	Competition
1	15 November 2020	Estadio Doroteo Guamuch Flores, Guatemala City, Guatemala	Honduras	1–0	2–1	Friendly
2	15 November 2020	Estadio Doroteo Guamuch Flores, Guatemala City, Guatemala	Honduras	2–0	2–1	Friendly
3	23 January 2021	Estadio Doroteo Guamuch Flores, Guatemala City, Guatemala	Puerto Rico	1–0	1–0	Friendly
4	27 March 2021	Ergilio Hato Stadium, Willemstad, Curaçao	British Virgin Islands	1–0	3–0	2022 FIFA World Cup qualification
5	4 June 2021	Estadio Doroteo Guamuch Flores, Guatemala City, Guatemala	Saint Vincent and the Grenadines	1–0	10–0	2022 FIFA World Cup qualification
6	3 July 2021	DRV PNK Stadium, Fort Lauderdale, United States	Guyana	3–0	4–0	2021 CONCACAF Gold Cup qualification
7	27 September 2022	BBVA Stadium, Houston, United States	Honduras	1–0	1–2	Friendly
8	19 November 2022	Dignity Health Sports Park, Carson, United States	Nicaragua	1–0	3–1	Friendly
9	19 November 2022	Dignity Health Sports Park, Carson, United States	Nicaragua	3–0	3–1	Friendly
10	13 March 2023	PayPal Park, San Jose, United States	Panama	1–1	1–1	Friendly
11	27 June 2023	DRV PNK Stadium, Fort Lauderdale, United States	Cuba	1–0	1–0	2023 CONCACAF Gold Cup
12	31 May 2025	Finley Stadium, Chattanooga, United States	El Salvador	1–0	1–1	Friendly
13	10 October 2025	Dr. Ir. Franklin Essed Stadion, Paramaribo, Suriname	Suriname	1–0	1–1	2026 FIFA World Cup qualification
14	18 November 2025	Estadio El Trébol, Guatemala City, Guatemala	Suriname	1–0	3–1	2026 FIFA World Cup qualification
15	28 September 2026	Estadio El Trébol, Guatemala City, Guatemala	El Salvador	1–0	6–0	2026–27 CONCACAF Nations League A

== Honours ==
Xelajú

- Liga Nacional: 2023 Clausura
