= Méddy Lina =

Guadeloupean footballer (born 1986)

Personal information
- Date of birth: 11 January 1986 (age 40)
- Place of birth: Les Abymes, Guadeloupe
- Height: 1.87 m (6 ft 2 in)
- Position: Defender

Team information
- Current team: Solidarité-Scolaire

Youth career
- Red Star Baie-Mahault

Senior career*
Years	Team	Apps	(Gls)
2003–2006	Red Star Baie-Mahault		
2006–2009	Evolucas		
2009–2011	Vannes	4	(0)
2010–2012	Vannes II	11	(0)
2012–2013	Caen II	13	(0)
2013	AS Cherbourg	17	(1)
2013–2014	Uzès Pont du Gard	28	(0)
2014–2017	Béziers	78	(5)
2017–2021	Boulogne	80	(1)
2019	Boulogne II	1	(0)
2021–	Solidarité-Scolaire		

International career^{‡}
2008–	Guadeloupe	22	(0)
Medal record
Men's football
Representing Guadeloupe
Caribbean Cup
Third place	2008 Jamaica
- * Club domestic league appearances and goals as of 3 July 2023 ‡ National team caps and goals as of 3 July 2023

Méddy Lina (born 11 January 1986) is a Guadeloupean professional footballer who plays as a defender for Solidarité-Scolaire. He made four appearances for Vannes in Ligue 2 during the 2008–09 season.

== Club career ==
Lina started playing football at the age of 5 at the Red Star Baie-Mahault club. At the age of 20, he joined Evolucas in the top level of Guadeloupe football. Whilst at the club he was selected by the Guadeloupe team, alongside pro players such as Aurélien Capoue and Stéphane Auvray. It was Auvray's move to Vannes OC which opened up the opportunity for Lina to trial with the club after the 2008 Caribbean Cup.

In July 2009, he was offered an amateur contract with Vannes, to play in their reserve team, but a month later, on 26 August 2009, he made his first team debut in the 2009–10 Coupe de la Ligue second round against AC Ajaccio. He made his Ligue 2 debut four days later against Le Havre AC. Injuries prevented him making appearances in the 2010–11 season, and he was released by Vannes in July 2011.

In September 2011 he was part of the UNFP team of uncontracted players which faced AJ Auxerre.

In February 2012, having not found a club, he was recruited by the manager of the Vannes reserve team.

In August 2012 he signed a contract with Caen, again with the reserve team, with the hope of gaining access to the first team. In January 2013, he was allowed to sign for AS Cherbourg in Championnat National. At the end of the season, Cherbourg were relegated, and Lina was recruited by ES Uzès Pont du Gard, who had just been re-drafted to the division.

Lina played three seasons for Béziers between 2014 and 2017, during which time he was made captain, before signing for US Boulogne in June 2017. On 1 February 2021, his contract with Boulogne was terminated by mutual agreement.

== Honours ==
Guadeloupe

- Caribbean Cup : third-place, 2008
