= Moïse Bombito =

Canadian soccer player (born 2000)

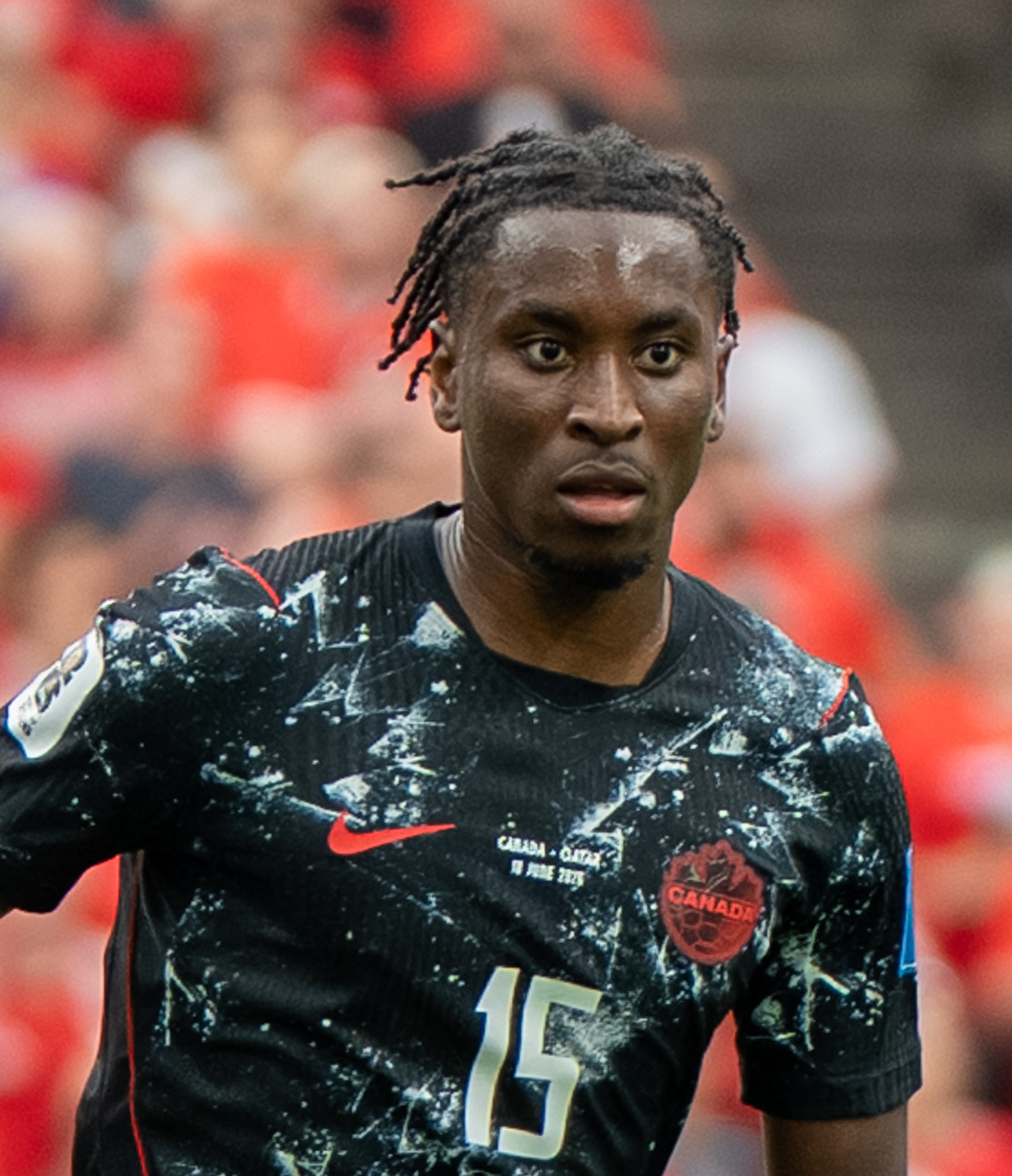
- Bombito with Canada in 2026

Personal information
- Full name: Moïse Bombito Lumpungu
- Date of birth: March 30, 2000 (age 26)
- Place of birth: Montreal, Quebec, Canada
- Height: 1.91 m (6 ft 3 in)
- Position: Centre-back

Team information
- Current team: Nice
- Number: 64

Youth career
- 2004–2013: CS St-Laurent

College career
Years	Team	Apps	(Gls)
2018–2019	Aigles du Collège Ahuntsic		
2020–2021	Iowa Western Reivers	39	(5)
2022	New Hampshire Wildcats	16	(4)

Senior career*
Years	Team	Apps	(Gls)
2020–2021	CS St-Hubert	13	(3)
2022	Seacoast United Phantoms	10	(3)
2023–2024	Colorado Rapids	29	(2)
2023	→ Colorado Rapids 2 (loan)	4	(0)
2024–	Nice	29	(0)

International career^{‡}
2023–	Canada	23	(0)
- * Club domestic league appearances and goals as of October 5, 2025 ‡ National team caps and goals as of July 4, 2026

Moïse Bombito Lumpungu (born March 30, 2000) is a Canadian professional soccer player who plays as a centre-back for Ligue 1 club Nice and the Canada national team.

== Early life ==
Born in Montreal, Quebec, Bombito is of Congolese descent. He began his youth soccer career with CS St-Laurent, where he initially played as a forward. At the age of 18, he declined an opportunity to join CS St-Hubert in the semi-professional Première ligue de soccer du Québec, choosing to remain with St-Laurent in the amateur Ligue de soccer élite du Québec to prioritize consistent playing time.

== College career ==
Bombito originally attended Collège Ahuntsic and played for their men's soccer team. In 2019, he was named to the RSEQ all-star team for Division 1 soccer.

After attending a combine hosted by António Ribeiro and Frederico Moojen, he began attending junior college in the United States, joining Iowa Western Community College. He played two seasons, finishing as national runner-up in the 2021 spring season, following it up with a national championship in the fall 2021 season. He earned 2021 All-American accolades, was named the ICCAC Tournament MVP, and was selected to the ICCAC All-Tournament Team and the ICCAC All-Region First Team.

In 2022, he transferred to the University of New Hampshire to play for the men's soccer team at the NCAA Division I level. On September 10, 2022, Bombito made his collegiate debut and also scored his first goal against the FIU Panthers. That season, he was named the team MVP, the ECAC Defensive Player of the Year, the America East Defender of the Year, was named to the All-ECAC First Team and All-America East First Team, and a Second Team All-American. He was also a MAC Hermann Trophy Semifinalist, was invited to play in the MLS College Showcase, and became the first UNH player to be selected to the Generation Adidas class. During his sole season with the school, he scored four goals, including two game winners.

== Club career ==
=== Early ===
In 2020, Bombito began playing with CS St-Hubert in the Première ligue de soccer du Québec, where he converted to centre-back.

In 2022, Bombito played for the Seacoast United Phantoms in the USL League Two, helping them win the Northeast Division title and being named to the USL League Two Team of the Year.

=== Colorado Rapids ===
On December 21, 2022, Bombito signed a Generation Adidas contract and was selected in the first round (3rd overall) of the 2023 MLS SuperDraft by the Colorado Rapids. He became the first player from the University of New Hampshire to be selected in the first round of the draft. After being an unused substitute in the opening match of the season, he suffered a knee injury during training, causing him to miss the next few weeks of action.

On May 7, Bombito made his debut for the Rapids' second team, Colorado Rapids 2, in MLS Next Pro against LA Galaxy II. He made his Major League Soccer debut on May 13. On May 24, he earned his first start for the Rapids in a U.S. Open Cup match against Real Salt Lake. On March 30, 2024, he scored his first MLS goal in a 3–2 victory over Los Angeles FC, which coincided with his 24th birthday.

=== Nice ===
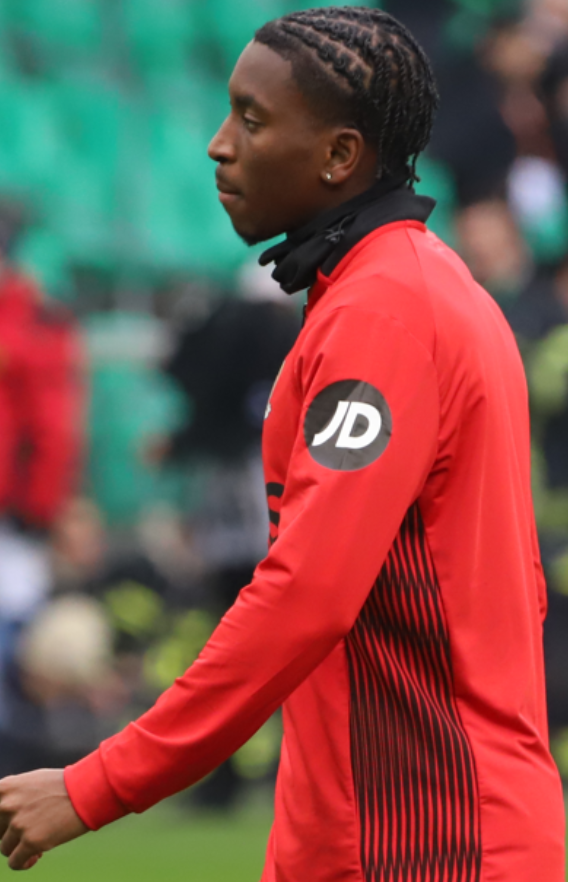
Bombito with Nice in 2025.

On August 19, 2024, Bombito transferred to French Ligue 1 side Nice, signing a contract until June 2028 for an undisclosed transfer fee. In their release, the Rapids stated the sale "breaks the MLS record fee for a center back while also surpassing Colorado’s outbound transfer record." Bombito made his Nice debut on August 25 against Toulouse.

After missing the Southern Derby due to a red card suspension, Bombito played every minute of Nice's remaining games in September, October and November. On September 25, 2024, the Canadian defender made his UEFA Europa League debut, starting in a group phase game versus Real Sociedad.

On October 5, 2025, Bombito suffered a left tibia fracture during a 2–2 draw with Monaco, following an entanglement with Folarin Balogun. Bombito had only recently returned to action after a four-month injury spell, which was caused by both a wrist fracture and a tibia stress fracture.

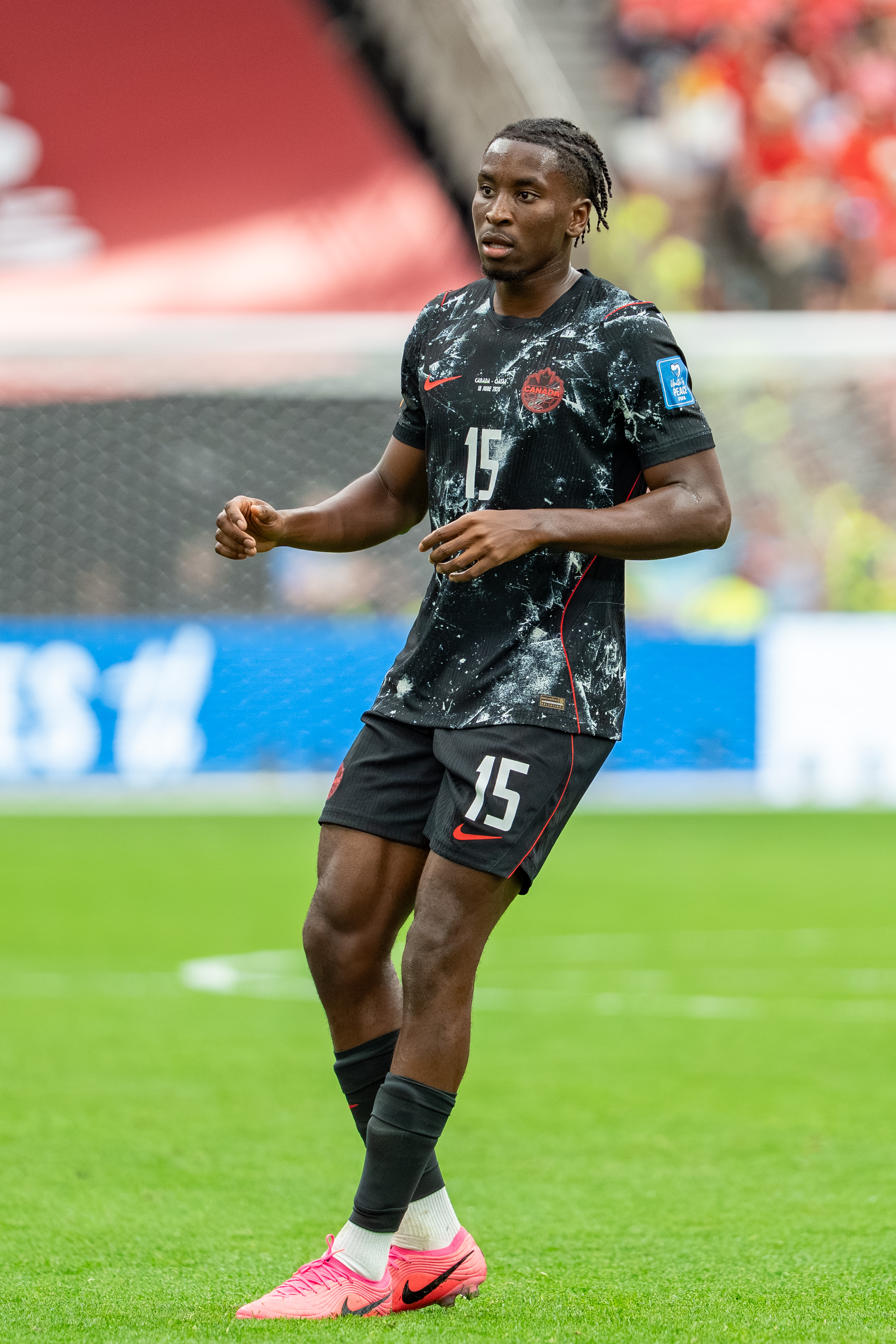
Bombito with Canada at the 2026 FIFA World Cup

== International career ==
In June 2023, Bombito was named to the Canadian national team for the 2023 CONCACAF Nations League Finals, as an injury replacement for Derek Cornelius. He became the second-fastest Generation Adidas player to earn a national team call-up (171 days after the draft), behind only national team teammate Cyle Larin. He was then subsequently named to the 23-man squad for the 2023 CONCACAF Gold Cup. Bombito made his debut in the opening match of the tournament on June 27 against Guadeloupe.

In June 2024, Bombito was named to Canada's squad for the 2024 Copa América. He played every minute of the tournament, providing an assist in the third-place match against Uruguay, which Canada ultimately lost on penalties.

On 28 May 2026, Bombito was selected for Canada's squad for the 2026 FIFA World Cup, which was co-hosted by Canada, Mexico, and the United States. After being ruled out of Canada's opening match, a 1–1 draw against Bosnia and Herzegovina, he made a substitute appearance in Canada's second group match, a 6–0 win over Qatar, a result which marked Canada's first World Cup victory and clean sheet ever. Canada advanced to the knock-out stages of the World Cup for the first time in its history, finishing as runners-up of Group B with four points. Bombito played in Canada's 1–0 victory over South Africa in the round of 32, and 3–0 defeat to Morocco in the round of 16.

== Career statistics ==
=== Club ===
As of match played October 5, 2025

Appearances and goals by club, season and competition
Club	Season	League			National cup (Note: Includes U.S. Open Cup, Coupe de France)		Continental		Other		Total	
Club	Season	Division	Apps	Goals	Apps	Goals	Apps	Goals	Apps	Goals	Apps	Goals
CS St-Hubert	2020	PLSQ	7	1	—		—		—		7	1
CS St-Hubert	2021	PLSQ	6	2	—		—		—		6	2
CS St-Hubert	Total		13	3	—		—		—		13	3
Seacoast United Phantoms	2022	USL League Two	10	3	—		—		3 (Note: Appearances in USL League Two play-offs)	0	13	3
Colorado Rapids 2	2023	MLS Next Pro	4	0	—		—		—		4	0
Colorado Rapids	2023	Major League Soccer	11	0	1	0	—		2 (Note: Appearances in Leagues Cup)	0	14	0
Colorado Rapids	2024	Major League Soccer	18	2	—		—		2	0	20	2
Colorado Rapids	Total		29	2	1	0	—		4	0	34	2
Nice	2024–25	Ligue 1	27	0	2	0	6 (Note: Appearances in UEFA Europa League)	0	—		35	0
Nice	2025–26	Ligue 1	2	0	0	0	0	0	0	0	2	0
Nice	Total		29	0	2	0	6	0	0	0	37	0
Career total			85	8	3	0	6	0	7	0	101	8

=== International ===
As of match played July 4, 2026

Appearances and goals by national team and year
National team	Year	Apps	Goals
Canada	2023	4	0
Canada	2024	13	0
Canada	2025	2	0
Canada	2026	4	0
Total		23	0

== Honours ==
Individual

- MLS All-Star: 2024
