= Alejandro Galindo (footballer) =

Guatemalan-Colombian footballer (born 1992)

Personal information
- Full name: Alejandro Miguel Galindo
- Date of birth: 5 March 1992 (age 34)
- Place of birth: Chinautla, Guatemala
- Height: 1.82 m (5 ft 11 1/2 in)
- Position: Midfielder

Team information
- Current team: Aurora

Youth career
- 2002–2004: Miguel Rizzo
- 2004–2009: Santa Fe

Senior career*
Years	Team	Apps	(Gls)
2009–2012	Santa Fe	3	(0)
2009–2010	→ Juventud (loan)	31	(1)
2013	Municipal	5	(0)
2014–2019	Antigua	206	(14)
2019–2021	Comunicaciones	44	(2)
2021–2023	Cobán Imperial	79	(4)
2023–2025	Municipal	56	(3)
2025–	Aurora	0	(0)

International career^{‡}
2012–	Guatemala	58	(8)
- * Club domestic league appearances and goals as of 20:00, 18 May 2025 (UTC) ‡ National team caps and goals as of 20:00, 16 March 2025 (UTC)

Alejandro Miguel Galindo (Spanish pronunciation: [ˌalexˈandɾo miɣˈel ɡalˈindo]; born 5 March 1992) is a Guatemalan professional footballer who plays as a midfielder for Liga Guate club Aurora and the Guatemala national team. He also holds Colombian citizenship.

== Early life ==
Born in Chinautla to a Guatemalan father and a Colombian mother, Galindo moved to Colombia with his mother when he was 10 years old. During his youth, he idolized Carlos Ruiz for his style of play.

At 12, he started playing in the lower divisions of the Colombian club Independiente Santa Fe.

== Club career ==
=== Santa Fe ===
==== 2009–10: Loan to Atlético Juventud ====
He debuted in the professional football in Atlético Juventud, an affiliated club of Santa Fe playing in the Categoría Primera B, where he played 31 matches and scored 1 goal.

==== 2011: Return to Santa Fe ====
He returned to Independiente Santa Fe for the 2011 Categoría Primera A season, debuting on 9 March in the draw 0–0 against Bogotá F.C. in the Copa Colombia.

==== 2012: League title and departure ====
Galindo played a total of 10 matches for Santa Fe (3 in the league and 7 in the Copa Colombia), and earned the 2012 Apertura title.

On 8 January 2013, Santa Fe confirmed that Galindo, along with six other players, were released from the club.

=== Municipal ===
He joined Municipal from the Liga Nacional for the 2013–14 season, after almost a year without having played a game. He debuted on 9 October, in the match against Malacateco.

=== Antigua ===
On 11 December 2018, Galindo confirmed his contract with Antigua was extended.

=== Comunicaciones ===
On 28 January 2021, Comunicaciones confirmed that Galindo would no longer continue with the club.

=== Cobán Imperial ===
After finishing his 90-day suspension, on 5 February, Galindo confirmed that he signed with Cobán Imperial.

=== Return to Municipal ===
On 8 June 2025, Galindo officially confirmed his departure from the club.

=== Aurora ===
On 11 July, Galindo made a shocking move to newly promoted Aurora.

== International career ==
=== 2012: Beginnings and FIFA World Cup qualification ===
Galindo made his debut for Guatemala, at just 20 years of age, as a substitute in on 26 April 2012 friendly match against Paraguay. He entered in the 46th minute, but the match ended in a 0–1 defeat. He played another friendly match on 2 June 2012 against Costa Rica, where he played 79 minutes, that ended in a 1–0 victory. His first match of the 2014 FIFA World Cup qualification was on 8 June 2012, in a 2–1 defeat against Jamaica.

=== 2020–2021: Suspension ===
On 12 December 2020, Galindo, Carlos Mejía, and Jorge Aparicio received a two-year ban from all football activities for attending a private party while on international duty. However, on 27 January 2021, after an investigation made by commission of the National Football Federation of Guatemala, the ban was later shortened to three months, as well as a fine of Q10 thousand.

== Career statistics ==
As of 22 February 2016

=== Club ===
Club performance			League		Cup		Continental		Total	
Season	Club	League	Apps	Goals	Apps	Goals	Apps	Goals	Apps	Goals
Colombia			League		Cup		South America		Total	
2009	Juventud	Categoría Primera B	31	1	-		0	0	31	1
2010	Juventud	Categoría Primera B	31	1	-		0	0	31	1
2011	Santa Fe	Categoría Primera A	2	0	3	0	0	0	5	0
2012	Santa Fe	Categoría Primera A	1	0	4	0	0	0	5	0
Guatemala			League		Cup		North America		Total	
2013–14	Municipal	Liga Nacional de Fútbol	5	0	0	0	0	0	5	0
2014–15	Antigua	Liga Nacional de Fútbol	39	3	0	0	0	0	39	3
2015–16	Antigua	Liga Nacional de Fútbol	17	0	0	0	0	0	17	0
Total	Colombia		34	1	7	0	0	0	41	1
Total	Guatemala		61	3	0	0	0	0	61	3
Total	Career total		95	4	7	0	0	0	102	4

=== International ===
==== International appearances ====
Team	Year	Apps	Goals
Guatemala	2012	3	0
Guatemala	2013	0	0
Guatemala	2014	0	0
Guatemala	2015	1	0
Guatemala	2016	0	0
Guatemala	2017	0	0
Guatemala	2018	1	0
Guatemala	2019	10	6
Guatemala	2020	3	0
Guatemala	2021	2	0
Guatemala	2022	12	0
Guatemala	2023	15	0
Guatemala	2024	6	2
Total		53	8

=== International goals ===
Scores and results list the Guatemala's goal tally first.

No.	Date	Venue	Opponent	Score	Result	Competition
1.	5 September 2019	Estadio Doroteo Guamuch Flores, Guatemala City, Guatemala	Anguilla	4–0	10–0	2019–20 CONCACAF Nations League C
2.	10 September 2019	Mayagüez Athletics Stadium, Mayagüez, Puerto Rico	Puerto Rico	1–0	5–0	2019–20 CONCACAF Nations League C
3.	16 November 2019	Estadio Doroteo Guamuch Flores, Guatemala City, Guatemala	Puerto Rico	2–0	5–0	2019–20 CONCACAF Nations League C
4.	16 November 2019	Estadio Doroteo Guamuch Flores, Guatemala City, Guatemala	Puerto Rico	3–0	5–0	2019–20 CONCACAF Nations League C
5.	21 November 2019	Estadio Israel Barrios, Coatepeque, Guatemala	Antigua and Barbuda	4–0	8–0	Friendly
6.	21 November 2019	Estadio Israel Barrios, Coatepeque, Guatemala	Antigua and Barbuda	5–0	8–0	Friendly
7.	8 June 2024	Estadio Doroteo Guamuch Flores, Guatemala City, Guatemala	Dominica	1–0	6–0	2026 FIFA World Cup qualification
8.	8 June 2024	Estadio Doroteo Guamuch Flores, Guatemala City, Guatemala	Dominica	3–0	6–0	2026 FIFA World Cup qualification

== Honours ==
Santa Fe

- Primera A: 2012 Apertura

Antigua

- Liga Nacional: 2015 Apertura, 2016 Apertura, 2017 Apertura, 2019 Clausura

Cobán Imperial

- Liga Nacional: 2022 Apertura

Municipal

- Liga Nacional: 2024 Clausura
