= Manuel Felipe Carrera Stadium =

Stadium in Guatemala City

Estadio Manuel Felipe Carrera
- Estadio El Trébol
- Interactive map of Estadio Manuel Felipe Carrera
- Former names: Ayunamiento Metropolitano
- Location: Guatemala City, Guatemala
- Coordinates: 14°37′01.0″N 90°32′05.0″W
- Owner: Municipalidad de Guatemala
- Capacity: 7,480
- Surface: Grass
- Field size: 105 m × 68 m (344 ft × 223 ft)

Construction
- Opened: 1991
- Renovated: 2012, 2025–present

Tenants
- Municipal (1991–present); Guatemala national football team (selected matches)

Manuel Felipe Carrera Stadium (Spanish: Estadio Manuel Felipe Carrera), also known as Estadio El Trébol (“The Clover”), is a football stadium in Guatemala City, Guatemala. It serves as the training venue and home ground for Liga Nacional club Municipal (Los Rojos), one of the most traditional clubs in the country. The stadium has a capacity of 10,000.

== History ==
A 2017 report by the National Football Federation of Guatemala found that the stadium was one of only four stadiums in Guatemala which met FIFA standards for security and infrastructure.

== See also ==
- Lists of stadiums
