= 2024 Copa América Group B =

Soccer tournament group

Group B of the 2024 Copa América was one of four groups in the first stage of the tournament. The tournament involved national teams from CONMEBOL (South America) but also includes invited teams from the CONCACAF region (North, Central America and the Caribbean), that qualified via the 2023–24 CONCACAF Nations League.

The group was made up of Mexico from CONCACAF, Ecuador and Venezuela, both from CONMEBOL, and Jamaica from CONCACAF. The draw for the groups was conducted on December 7, 2023, with Mexico being previously seeded into the group. The group's matches took place from June 22–30 at six venues in six U.S. cities.

The top two teams, following a round-robin of three matches per team, advanced to the quarter-finals.

== Teams ==
Draw position	Team	Pot	Confederation	Method of qualification	Appearances		Previous best performance	FIFA Rankings	
Draw position	Team	Pot	Confederation	Method of qualification	Total	Last	Previous best performance	November 2023 (Note: The rankings of November 2023 were used for seeding for the final draw, except for Mexico who were seeded as head of Group B for being the 2023 CONCACAF Gold Cup champions regardless their position in the FIFA ranking.)	June 2024
B1 (seed)	Mexico	1	CONCACAF	2023–24 CNL A semifinalist	11th	2016	Runners-up (1993 and 2001)	14	15
B2	Ecuador	2	CONMEBOL	Automatic qualifier	30th	2021	Fourth place (1959 and 1993)	32	30
B3	Venezuela	3	CONMEBOL	Automatic qualifier	20th	2021	Fourth place (2011)	49	54
B4	Jamaica	4	CONCACAF	2023–24 CNL A semifinalist	3rd	2016	Group stage (2015 and 2016)	55	53

== Standings ==
Pos	Team	Pld	W	D	L	GF	GA	GD	Pts	Qualification
1	Venezuela	3	3	0	0	6	1	+5	9	Advance to knockout stage
2	Ecuador	3	1	1	1	4	3	+1	4	Advance to knockout stage
3	Mexico	3	1	1	1	1	1	0	4	
4	Jamaica	3	0	0	3	1	7	−6	0	

Source: CONMEBOL
Rules for classification: Tiebreakers

In the quarter-finals:

- The winners of Group B, Venezuela, advanced to play the runner-up of Group A, Canada.
- The runners-up of Group B, Ecuador, advanced to play the winners of Group A, Argentina.

== Matches ==
All kick-off times are local times, as listed by CONMEBOL.

=== Ecuador vs Venezuela ===
The two teams had faced each other 32 times previously, including four Copa América group stage matches: the 6–1 and 4–0 wins for Ecuador in 1993 and 2001, a 1–0 victory for Venezuela in 2011 and a 2–2 draw in 2021. Their most recent meeting was a goalless draw on Venezuelan soil in the 2026 FIFA World Cup qualification in November 2023.

June 22, 2024
3:00 pm PDT (UTC−7)

Ecuador	1–2	Venezuela
Sarmiento 40'	Report (CONMEBOL); Report (CONCACAF)	Cádiz 64'; Bello 74'

Levi's Stadium, Santa Clara, California
Attendance: 29,864
Referee: Wilmar Roldán (Colombia)

Ecuador	Venezuela

GK	22	Alexander Domínguez
RB	17	Ángelo Preciado
CB	2	Félix Torres
CB	6	Willian Pacho
LB	3	Piero Hincapié
CM	21	Alan Franco		(substituted off) 79'
CM	23	Moisés Caicedo
RW	9	John Yeboah		(substituted off) 35'
AM	10	Kendry Páez	(yellow card) 45+1'	(substituted off) 79'
LW	16	Jeremy Sarmiento	(yellow card) 29'	(substituted off) 62'
CF	13	Enner Valencia (c)	(red card) 22'
Substitutions:
FW	11	Kevin Rodríguez		(substituted on) 35'
MF	8	Carlos Gruezo		(substituted on) 62'
MF	14	Alan Minda		(substituted on) 79'
FW	19	Jordy Caicedo		(substituted on) 79'
Manager:
(Spain) Félix Sánchez

GK	22	Rafael Romo
RB	21	Alexander González
CB	2	Nahuel Ferraresi
CB	3	Yordan Osorio
LB	15	Miguel Navarro
CM	13	José Andrés Martínez
CM	6	Yangel Herrera		(substituted off) 90+2'
RW	11	Darwin Machís	(yellow card) 31'	(substituted off) 46'
AM	18	Cristian Cásseres Jr.	(yellow card) 45+3'	(substituted off) 46'
LW	10	Yeferson Soteldo		(substituted off) 84'
CF	23	Salomón Rondón (c)		(substituted off) 84'
Substitutions:
FW	9	Jhonder Cádiz		(substituted on) 46'
MF	25	Eduard Bello		(substituted on) 46'
MF	7	Jefferson Savarino		(substituted on) 84'
FW	19	Eric Ramírez		(substituted on) 84'
MF	8	Tomás Rincón		(substituted on) 90+2'
Manager:
(Argentina) Fernando Batista

Man of the Match:
Salomón Rondón (Venezuela)

Assistant referees:
Alexander Guzmán (Colombia)
Jhon León (Colombia)
Fourth official:
Kevin Ortega (Peru)
Fifth official:
Michael Orué (Peru)
Video assistant referee:
Juan Lara (Chile)
Assistant video assistant referee:
Edson Cisternas (Chile)

=== Mexico vs Jamaica ===
The two teams had met 28 times previously (all in competitive events), including Mexico's 2–0 group stage win at the Copa América Centenario in 2016, which was the only previous meeting between the two sides in the Copa América. Their most recent encounter was a 3–0 semifinal victory for Mexico in the 2023 CONCACAF Gold Cup.

June 22, 2024
8:00 pm CDT (UTC−5)

Mexico	1–0	Jamaica
Arteaga 69'	Report (CONMEBOL); Report (CONCACAF)

NRG Stadium, Houston, Texas
Attendance: 53,763
Referee: Ismail Elfath (United States)

Mexico	Jamaica

GK	1	Julio González
RB	2	Jorge Sánchez
CB	3	César Montes
CB	5	Johan Vásquez
LB	6	Gerardo Arteaga
CM	4	Edson Álvarez (c)	(substituted off) 30'
CM	24	Luis Chávez	(substituted off) 78'
RW	15	Uriel Antuna	(substituted off) 78'
AM	17	Orbelín Pineda	(substituted off) 68'
LW	9	Julián Quiñones
CF	11	Santiago Giménez	(substituted off) 68'
Substitutions:
MF	7	Luis Romo	(substituted on) 30'
FW	22	Guillermo Martínez	(substituted on) 68'
MF	8	Carlos Rodríguez	(substituted on) 68'
MF	25	Roberto Alvarado	(substituted on) 78'
MF	14	Érick Sánchez	(substituted on) 78'
Manager:
Jaime Lozano

GK	23	Jahmali Waite
CB	6	Di'Shon Bernard	(substituted off) 68'
CB	15	Joel Latibeaudiere
CB	5	Ethan Pinnock
RM	2	Dexter Lembikisa
CM	10	Bobby De Cordova-Reid (c)	(substituted off) 81'
CM	14	Kasey Palmer
LM	22	Greg Leigh
AM	11	Shamar Nicholson
AM	7	Demarai Gray	(substituted off) 68'
CF	9	Michail Antonio	(substituted off) 81'
Substitutions:
DF	17	Damion Lowe	(substituted on) 68'
DF	3	Michael Hector	(substituted on) 68'
FW	20	Renaldo Cephas	(substituted on) 81'
FW	8	Kaheim Dixon	(substituted on) 81'
Manager:
(Iceland) Heimir Hallgrímsson

Man of the Match:
Gerardo Arteaga (Mexico)

Assistant referees:
Corey Parker (United States)
Kyle Atkins (United States)
Fourth official:
Tori Penso (United States)
Fifth official:
Brooke Mayo (United States)
Video assistant referee:
Armando Villarreal (United States)
Assistant video assistant referee:
Tatiana Guzmán (Nicaragua)

=== Ecuador vs Jamaica ===
The two teams had met in four previous matches, all of them friendlies, with three wins for Ecuador and one draw. The most recent was a 2–0 Ecuadorian victory in September 2018.

June 26, 2024
3:00 pm PDT (UTC−7)

Ecuador	3–1	Jamaica
Hincapié 13'; Páez 45+4' (pen.); Minda 90+1'	Report (CONMEBOL); Report (CONCACAF)	Antonio 54'

Allegiant Stadium, Paradise, Nevada
Attendance: 24,074
Referee: Cristián Garay (Chile)

Ecuador	Jamaica

GK	22	Alexander Domínguez (c)
RB	17	Ángelo Preciado
CB	2	Félix Torres
CB	6	Willian Pacho
LB	3	Piero Hincapié
CM	21	Alan Franco
CM	23	Moisés Caicedo
RW	9	John Yeboah	(substituted off) 64'
AM	10	Kendry Páez	(substituted off) 88'
LW	16	Jeremy Sarmiento	(substituted off) 90+5'
CF	11	Kevin Rodríguez	(substituted off) 87'
Substitutions:
MF	14	Alan Minda	(substituted on) 64'
FW	19	Jordy Caicedo	(substituted on) 87'
MF	8	Carlos Gruezo	(substituted on) 88'
MF	20	Janner Corozo	(substituted on) 90+5'
Manager:
(Spain) Félix Sánchez

GK	23	Jahmali Waite
CB	6	Di'Shon Bernard		(substituted off) 46'
CB	15	Joel Latibeaudiere	(yellow card) 80'	(substituted off) 83'
CB	5	Ethan Pinnock
RM	2	Dexter Lembikisa		(substituted off) 90'
CM	17	Damion Lowe (c)	(yellow card) 39'	(substituted off) 46'
CM	14	Kasey Palmer
LM	22	Greg Leigh
AM	11	Shamar Nicholson		(substituted off) 83'
AM	10	Bobby De Cordova-Reid
CF	9	Michail Antonio
Substitutions:
FW	7	Demarai Gray		(substituted on) 46'
DF	3	Michael Hector	(yellow card) 49'	(substituted on) 46'
FW	8	Kaheim Dixon		(substituted on) 83'
MF	16	Karoy Anderson	(yellow card) 90+4'	(substituted on) 83'
FW	20	Renaldo Cephas		(substituted on) 90'
Manager:
(Iceland) Heimir Hallgrímsson

Man of the Match:
Moisés Caicedo (Ecuador)

Assistant referees:
José Retamal (Chile)
Juan Serrano (Chile)
Fourth official:
Yael Falcón (Argentina)
Fifth official:
Facundo Rodríguez (Argentina)
Video assistant referee:
Nicolás Gallo (Colombia)
Assistant video assistant referee:
Derlis López (Paraguay)

=== Venezuela vs Mexico ===
The two teams had met 12 times previously, including three Copa América group stage matches with two victories for Mexico in 1995 and 1999, both by a 3–1 score, and a 1–1 draw in 2016. Their most recent meeting was Mexico's 3–1 win in a friendly game held in June 2019 and overall, Venezuela’s third win since an encounter between the two in August 1982.

June 26, 2024
6:00 pm PDT (UTC−7)

Venezuela	1–0	Mexico
Rondón 57' (pen.)	Report (CONMEBOL); Report (CONCACAF)

SoFi Stadium, Inglewood, California
Attendance: 72,773
Referee: Raphael Claus (Brazil)

Venezuela	Mexico

GK	22	Rafael Romo
RB	4	Jon Aramburu
CB	2	Nahuel Ferraresi	(yellow card) 35'
CB	3	Yordan Osorio
LB	15	Miguel Navarro	(yellow card) 64'
CM	13	José Andrés Martínez
CM	6	Yangel Herrera		(substituted off) 89'
RW	25	Eduard Bello		(substituted off) 71'
AM	7	Jefferson Savarino		(substituted off) 46'
LW	10	Yeferson Soteldo		(substituted off) 82'
CF	23	Salomón Rondón (c)		(substituted off) 82'
Substitutions:
MF	18	Cristian Cásseres Jr.		(substituted on) 46'
MF	11	Darwin Machís		(substituted on) 71'
DF	20	Wilker Ángel		(substituted on) 82'
FW	9	Jhonder Cádiz		(substituted on) 82'
DF	14	Christian Makoun		(substituted on) 89'
Manager:
(Argentina) Fernando Batista

GK	1	Julio González
RB	2	Jorge Sánchez
CB	3	César Montes (c)		(substituted off) 46'
CB	5	Johan Vásquez
LB	6	Gerardo Arteaga
CM	7	Luis Romo
CM	24	Luis Chávez
RW	15	Uriel Antuna		(substituted off) 73'
AM	8	Carlos Rodríguez		(substituted off) 61'
LW	9	Julián Quiñones		(substituted off) 78'
CF	11	Santiago Giménez	(yellow card) 39'	(substituted off) 61'
Substitutions:
DF	19	Israel Reyes		(substituted on) 46'
FW	22	Guillermo Martínez		(substituted on) 61'
FW	10	Alexis Vega	(yellow card) 64'	(substituted on) 61'
FW	21	César Huerta		(substituted on) 73'
MF	17	Orbelín Pineda		(substituted on) 78'
Manager:
Jaime Lozano

Man of the Match:
Salomón Rondón (Venezuela)

Assistant referees:
Danilo Manis (Brazil)
Rodrigo Correa (Brazil)
Fourth official:
Wilton Sampaio (Brazil)
Fifth official:
Bruno Pires (Brazil)
Video assistant referee:
Pablo Gonçalves (Brazil)
Assistant video assistant referee:
Eduardo Britos (Paraguay)

=== Mexico vs Ecuador ===
The two teams had met 23 times previously, (Note: There are three friendly matches played between Mexico and Ecuador, two in 1970 and one in 1984 and all three won by Mexico, but they are not considered international "A" matches by FIFA.) including five matches in the Copa América with three victories for Mexico, one for Ecuador and one draw. Mexico's 2–0 semifinal win in 1993 was followed by a 1–1 quarterfinal draw in 1997, with Mexico winning 4–2 on penalties. Three group stage matches followed, with two 2–1 wins for Mexico in 2004 and 2007 and a 2–1 win for Ecuador in 2015. The sides most recently met in a friendly in June 2022, which ended in a goalless draw.

June 30, 2024
5:00 pm MST (UTC−7)

Mexico	0–0	Ecuador
	Report (CONMEBOL); Report (CONCACAF)

State Farm Stadium, Glendale, Arizona
Attendance: 62,565
Referee: Mario Escobar (Guatemala)

Mexico	Ecuador

GK	1	Julio González
RB	2	Jorge Sánchez	(yellow card) 50'
CB	3	César Montes (c)	(yellow card) 6'
CB	5	Johan Vásquez	(yellow card) 82'
LB	6	Gerardo Arteaga		(substituted off) 90+1'
CM	17	Orbelín Pineda		(substituted off) 67'
CM	7	Luis Romo		(substituted off) 85'
CM	24	Luis Chávez	(yellow card) 73'
RF	21	César Huerta		(substituted off) 67'
CF	11	Santiago Giménez
LF	9	Julián Quiñones		(substituted off) 86'
Substitutions:
FW	22	Guillermo Martínez		(substituted on) 67'
FW	15	Uriel Antuna	(yellow card) 90+4'	(substituted on) 67'
MF	14	Érick Sánchez		(substituted on) 85'
MF	16	Jordi Cortizo		(substituted on) 86'
FW	10	Alexis Vega		(substituted on) 90+1'
Manager:
Jaime Lozano

GK	22	Alexander Domínguez
RB	17	Ángelo Preciado		(substituted off) 90'
CB	2	Félix Torres
CB	6	Willian Pacho
LB	3	Piero Hincapié
CM	21	Alan Franco
CM	23	Moisés Caicedo	(yellow card) 43'
AM	10	Kendry Páez		(substituted off) 67'
AM	16	Jeremy Sarmiento		(substituted off) 76'
CF	11	Kevin Rodríguez		(substituted off) 76'
CF	13	Enner Valencia (c)
Substitutions:
MF	11	Alan Minda		(substituted on) 67'
MF	15	Ángel Mena		(substituted on) 76'
MF	8	Carlos Gruezo		(substituted on) 76'
DF	24	José Hurtado		(substituted on) 90'
Manager:
(Spain) Félix Sánchez

Man of the Match:
Moisés Caicedo (Ecuador)

Assistant referees:
Luis Ventura (Guatemala)
Brooke Mayo (United States)
Fourth official:
Tori Penso (United States)
Fifth official:
Kathryn Nesbitt (United States)
Video assistant referee:
Silvio Trucco (Argentine)
Assistant video assistant referee:
Rodrigo Carvajal (Chile)

=== Jamaica vs Venezuela ===
The two teams had met six times previously, including Venezuela's 1–0 group stage victory at the Copa América Centenario in 2016, which had also been their last meeting. The other five matches were all friendlies, with two wins per side and one draw.

June 30, 2024
7:00 pm CDT (UTC−5)

Jamaica	0–3	Venezuela
	Report (CONMEBOL); Report (CONCACAF)	Bello 49'; Rondón 56'; Ramírez 85'

Q2 Stadium, Austin, Texas
Attendance: 20,240
Referee: Maurizio Mariani (Italy)

Jamaica	Venezuela

GK	23	Jahmali Waite
CB	15	Joel Latibeaudiere		(substituted off) 87'
CB	3	Michael Hector	(yellow card) 89'
CB	5	Ethan Pinnock
RM	12	Wes Harding		(substituted off) 67'
CM	17	Damion Lowe (c)
CM	14	Kasey Palmer
LM	21	Jon Bell
AM	20	Renaldo Cephas		(substituted off) 46'
AM	7	Demarai Gray		(substituted off) 88'
CF	9	Michail Antonio		(substituted off) 67'
Substitutions:
FW	8	Kaheim Dixon		(substituted on) 46'
FW	11	Shamar Nicholson		(substituted on) 67'
MF	16	Karoy Anderson		(substituted on) 67'
DF	4	Richard King		(substituted on) 87'
MF	18	Alex Marshall		(substituted on) 88'
Manager:
(Iceland) Heimir Hallgrímsson

GK	22	Rafael Romo
RB	21	Alexander González
CB	3	Yordan Osorio
CB	20	Wilker Ángel
LB	4	Jon Aramburu		(substituted off) 81'
CM	13	José Andrés Martínez
CM	6	Yangel Herrera		(substituted off) 60'
RW	25	Eduard Bello
AM	16	Telasco Segovia		(substituted off) 74'
LW	11	Darwin Machís	(yellow card) 9'	(substituted off) 60'
CF	23	Salomón Rondón (c)		(substituted off) 81'
Substitutions:
MF	10	Yeferson Soteldo		(substituted on) 60'
MF	8	Tomás Rincón		(substituted on) 60'
MF	24	Kervin Andrade		(substituted on) 74'
FW	19	Eric Ramírez		(substituted on) 81'
DF	14	Christian Makoun		(substituted on) 81'
Manager:
(Argentina) Fernando Batista

Man of the Match:
Salomón Rondón (Venezuela)

Assistant referees:
Daniele Bindoni (Italy)
Alberto Tegoni (Italy)
Fourth official:
Andrés Matonte (Uruguay)
Fifth official:
Miguel Roldán (Colombia)
Video assistant referee:
Marco Di Bello (Italy)
Assistant video assistant referee:
Aleandro Di Paolo (Italy)
