= 2024 Copa América knockout stage =

International football tournament

The knockout stage of the 2024 Copa América began on July 4 with the quarter-finals and ended on July 14, 2024, with the final at Hard Rock Stadium in Miami Gardens, Florida.

All kickoff times are local times, as listed by CONMEBOL.

== Format ==
In the knockout stage, if a match was tied after 90 minutes:

- In the quarter-finals, semi-finals and third place play-off, extra time would not be played, and the match would be decided by a penalty shootout.
- In the final, extra time would be played. If still tied after extra time, the match would be decided by a penalty shootout.

== Qualified teams ==
The top two placed teams from each group qualified for the knockout stage.

| Group | Winners | Runners-up |
|---|---|---|
| A | Argentina | Canada |
| B | Venezuela | Ecuador |
| C | Uruguay | Panama |
| D | Colombia | Brazil |

== Bracket ==
Quarter-finals
July 4 – Houston, TX
Argentina (p) | 1 (4)
Ecuador | 1 (2)
July 5 – Arlington, TX
Venezuela | 1 (3)
Canada (p) | 1 (4)
July 6 – Paradise, NV
Uruguay (p) | 0 (4)
Brazil | 0 (2)
July 6 – Glendale, AZ
Colombia | 5
Panama | 0

Semi-finals
July 9 – East Rutherford, NJ
Argentina | 2
Canada | 0
July 10 – Charlotte, NC
Uruguay | 0
Colombia | 1

Final
July 14 – Miami Gardens, FL
Argentina (a.e.t.) | 1
Colombia | 0
Third place play-off
July 13 – Charlotte, NC
Canada | 2 (3)
Uruguay (p) | 2 (4)

== Quarter-finals ==
=== Argentina vs Ecuador ===
The teams had faced each other in 40 previous matches, including 16 times in the Copa América with a wide advantage for Argentina who won 11 of those matches with 5 draws and no Ecuadorian victories. This was only the second meeting between the sides in a Copa América knockout stage with the first being the quarter-final match won 3–0 by Argentina in the previous edition in 2021. Their most recent meeting was a friendly won 1–0 by Argentina, just a few days before the tournament began.

July 4, 2024
8:00 pm CDT (UTC−5)

| Argentina | 1–1 | Ecuador |
|---|---|---|
| Li. Martínez 35' | Report (CONMEBOL); Report (CONCACAF) | Rodríguez 90+2' |
Penalties
| Messi (penalty missed); Alvarez (penalty scored); Mac Allister (penalty scored); Montiel (penalty scored); Otamendi (penalty scored) | 4–2 | (penalty missed) Mena; (penalty missed) Minda; (penalty scored) Yeboah; (penalty scored) J. Caicedo |

NRG Stadium, Houston, Texas
Attendance: 69,456
Referee: Andrés Matonte (Uruguay)

| Argentina | Ecuador |

| GK | 23 | Emiliano Martínez |
| RB | 26 | Nahuel Molina | | (substituted off) 90+5' |
| CB | 13 | Cristian Romero |
| CB | 25 | Lisandro Martínez | | (substituted off) 78' |
| LB | 3 | Nicolás Tagliafico | (yellow card) 81' |
| RM | 7 | Rodrigo De Paul |
| CM | 20 | Alexis Mac Allister |
| CM | 24 | Enzo Fernández | | (substituted off) 78' |
| LM | 15 | Nicolás González | (yellow card) 77' |
| CF | 10 | Lionel Messi (c) |
| CF | 22 | Lautaro Martínez | | (substituted off) 65' |
Substitutions:
| FW | 9 | Julián Alvarez | | (substituted on) 65' |
| DF | 19 | Nicolás Otamendi | | (substituted on) 78' |
| MF | 16 | Giovani Lo Celso | | (substituted on) 78' |
| DF | 4 | Gonzalo Montiel | | (substituted on) 90+5' |
Manager:
Lionel Scaloni

| GK | 22 | Alexander Domínguez |
| RB | 17 | Ángelo Preciado |
| CB | 2 | Félix Torres |
| CB | 6 | Willian Pacho |
| LB | 3 | Piero Hincapié |
| CM | 8 | Carlos Gruezo | | (substituted off) 80' |
| CM | 21 | Alan Franco | | (substituted off) 87' |
| RW | 10 | Kendry Páez | | (substituted off) 76' |
| AM | 23 | Moisés Caicedo | (yellow card) 75' |
| LW | 16 | Jeremy Sarmiento | | (substituted off) 76' |
| CF | 13 | Enner Valencia (c) | (yellow card) 30' | (substituted off) 80' |
Substitutions:
| MF | 14 | Alan Minda | | (substituted on) 76' |
| FW | 11 | Kevin Rodríguez | | (substituted on) 76' |
| MF | 15 | Ángel Mena | | (substituted on) 80' |
| MF | 9 | John Yeboah | | (substituted on) 80' |
| FW | 19 | Jordy Caicedo | | (substituted on) 87' |
Manager:
(Spain) Félix Sánchez

Man of the Match:
Emiliano Martínez (Argentina)

Assistant referees:
Nicolás Tarán (Uruguay)
Martín Soppi (Uruguay)
Fourth official:
Gustavo Tejera (Uruguay)
Fifth official:
Pablo Llarena (Uruguay)
Video assistant referee:
Leodán González (Uruguay)
Assistant video assistant referees:
Richard Trinidad (Uruguay)
Cristhian Ferreyra (Uruguay)

=== Venezuela vs Canada ===
The teams had met twice before, both in friendlies that ended in draws: 2–2 in June 2007 and 1–1 in May 2010. This was their first competitive meeting.

July 5, 2024
8:00 pm CDT (UTC−5)

| Venezuela | 1–1 | Canada |
|---|---|---|
| Rondón 65' | Report (CONMEBOL); Report (CONCACAF) | Shaffelburg 13' |
Penalties
| Rondón (penalty scored); Herrera (penalty missed); Rincón (penalty scored); Savarino (penalty missed); Cádiz (penalty scored); Ángel (penalty missed) | 3–4 | (penalty scored) David; (penalty missed) Millar; (penalty scored) Bombito; (penalty missed) Eustáquio; (penalty scored) Davies; (penalty scored) Koné |

AT&T Stadium, Arlington, Texas
Attendance: 51,080
Referee: Wilton Sampaio (Brazil)

| Venezuela | Canada |

| GK | 22 | Rafael Romo |
| RB | 4 | Jon Aramburu | (yellow card) 90+4' |
| CB | 2 | Nahuel Ferraresi |
| CB | 3 | Yordan Osorio | | (substituted off) 90+2' |
| LB | 15 | Miguel Navarro |
| DM | 18 | Cristian Cásseres Jr. | | (substituted off) 60' |
| RM | 25 | Eduard Bello | | (substituted off) 84' |
| CM | 13 | José Andrés Martínez | | (substituted off) 90+2' |
| CM | 6 | Yangel Herrera |
| LM | 10 | Yeferson Soteldo | | (substituted off) 84' |
| CF | 23 | Salomón Rondón (c) |
Substitutions:
| FW | 9 | Jhonder Cádiz | | (substituted on) 60' |
| MF | 7 | Jefferson Savarino | | (substituted on) 84' |
| MF | 17 | Matías Lacava | | (substituted on) 84' |
| MF | 8 | Tomás Rincón | | (substituted on) 90+2' |
| DF | 20 | Wilker Ángel | | (substituted on) 90+2' |
Manager:
(Argentina) Fernando Batista

| GK | 16 | Maxime Crépeau |
| RB | 2 | Alistair Johnston |
| CB | 15 | Moïse Bombito |
| CB | 13 | Derek Cornelius | (yellow card) 50' |
| LB | 19 | Alphonso Davies (c) |
| CM | 21 | Jonathan Osorio | | (substituted off) 81' |
| CM | 7 | Stephen Eustáquio |
| RW | 22 | Richie Laryea | | (substituted off) 72' |
| AM | 10 | Jonathan David |
| LW | 14 | Jacob Shaffelburg | (yellow card) 36' | (substituted off) 62' |
| CF | 9 | Cyle Larin | | (substituted off) 72' |
Substitutions:
| FW | 23 | Liam Millar | | (substituted on) 62' |
| FW | 25 | Tani Oluwaseyi | | (substituted on) 72' |
| MF | 20 | Ali Ahmed | | (substituted on) 72' |
| MF | 8 | Ismaël Koné | | (substituted on) 81' |
Manager:
(United States) Jesse Marsch

Man of the Match:
Jacob Shaffelburg (Canada)

Assistant referees:
Bruno Pires (Brazil)
Bruno Boschilia (Brazil)
Fourth official:
Juan Benítez (Paraguay)
Fifth official:
Milcíades Saldívar (Paraguay)
Video assistant referee:
Rodolpho Toski (Brazil)
Assistant video assistant referees:
Daniel Nobre (Brazil)
Pablo Gonçalves (Brazil)

=== Colombia vs Panama ===
The teams had previously met six times, with Colombia winning four matches and Panama two, but this was their first Copa América meeting. The sides had already met in a knockout stage of a continental tournament, when Panama won 3–2 in the 2005 CONCACAF Gold Cup semi-finals. They most recently met in a June 2019 friendly, won by Colombia 3–0.

July 6, 2024
3:00 pm MST (UTC−7)

| Colombia | 5–0 | Panama |
|---|---|---|
| Córdoba 8'; Rodríguez 15' (pen.); Díaz 41'; Ríos 70'; Borja 90+4' (pen.) | Report (CONMEBOL); Report (CONCACAF) |

State Farm Stadium, Glendale, Arizona
Attendance: 39,740
Referee: Maurizio Mariani (Italy)

| Colombia | Panama |

| GK | 12 | Camilo Vargas |
| RB | 21 | Daniel Muñoz | | (substituted off) 72' |
| CB | 23 | Davinson Sánchez |
| CB | 2 | Carlos Cuesta |
| LB | 17 | Johan Mojica |
| CM | 6 | Richard Ríos |
| CM | 15 | Mateus Uribe | (yellow card) 45' |
| CM | 11 | Jhon Arias | | (substituted off) 65' |
| RF | 10 | James Rodríguez (c) | | (substituted off) 72' |
| CF | 24 | Jhon Córdoba | | (substituted off) 79' |
| LF | 7 | Luis Díaz | | (substituted off) 65' |
Substitutions:
| FW | 18 | Luis Sinisterra | | (substituted on) 65' |
| MF | 8 | Jorge Carrascal | | (substituted on) 65' |
| DF | 4 | Santiago Arias | | (substituted on) 72' |
| MF | 20 | Juan Fernando Quintero | | (substituted on) 72' |
| FW | 9 | Miguel Borja | | (substituted on) 79' |
Manager:
(Argentina) Néstor Lorenzo

| GK | 22 | Orlando Mosquera |
| CB | 24 | Edgardo Fariña | (yellow card) 64' |
| CB | 3 | José Córdoba | (yellow card) 90+2' |
| CB | 25 | Roderick Miller | | (substituted off) 46' |
| RWB | 23 | Michael Amir Murillo |
| LWB | 15 | Eric Davis (c) | | (substituted off) 82' |
| RM | 2 | César Blackman | | (substituted off) 46' |
| CM | 6 | Cristian Martínez | | (substituted off) 62' |
| CM | 14 | Jovani Welch | (yellow card) 54' |
| LM | 10 | Yoel Bárcenas |
| CF | 17 | José Fajardo | | (substituted off) 85' |
Substitutions:
| FW | 9 | Eduardo Guerrero | | (substituted on) 46' |
| MF | 16 | Carlos Harvey | | (substituted on) 46' |
| MF | 5 | Abdiel Ayarza | | (substituted on) 62' |
| DF | 18 | Omar Valencia | | (substituted on) 82' |
| FW | 11 | Ismael Díaz | | (substituted on) 85' |
Manager:
(Spain) Thomas Christiansen

Man of the Match:
James Rodríguez (Colombia)

Assistant referees:
Daniele Bindoni (Italy)
Alberto Tegoni (Italy)
Fourth official:
Kevin Ortega (Peru)
Fifth official:
Michael Orué (Peru)
Video assistant referee:
Marco Di Bello (Italy)
Assistant video assistant referees:
Aleandro Di Paolo (Italy)
Gery Vargas (Bolivia)

=== Uruguay vs Brazil ===
This was the eightieth meeting between these two historic rivals with Brazil winning 38 of the previous 79 matches to Uruguay's 21 wins and 20 draws. However, the record in the 26 previous Copa América matches was fairly even, with nine wins for each side and eight draws, although the last Uruguayan triumph dated back to the 1983 Copa América when they won 2–0. Their most recent meeting was in October 2023, with Uruguay winning 2–0 at home in the 2026 FIFA World Cup qualification.

July 6, 2024
6:00 pm PDT (UTC−7)

| Uruguay | 0–0 | Brazil |
|---|---|---|
| | Report (CONMEBOL); Report (CONCACAF) |
Penalties
| Valverde (penalty scored); Bentancur (penalty scored); De Arrascaeta (penalty scored); Giménez (penalty missed); Ugarte (penalty scored) | 4–2 | (penalty missed) Militão; (penalty scored) Pereira; (penalty missed) Douglas Luiz; (penalty scored) Martinelli |

Allegiant Stadium, Paradise, Nevada
Attendance: 55,770
Referee: Darío Herrera (Argentina)

| Uruguay | Brazil |

| GK | 1 | Sergio Rochet |
| RB | 8 | Nahitan Nández | (red card) 74' |
| CB | 4 | Ronald Araújo | | (substituted off) 33' |
| CB | 16 | Mathías Olivera |
| LB | 17 | Matías Viña | | (substituted off) 46' |
| CM | 5 | Manuel Ugarte | (yellow card) 51' |
| CM | 15 | Federico Valverde (c) |
| RW | 11 | Facundo Pellistri | | (substituted off) 77' |
| AM | 7 | Nicolás de la Cruz | (yellow card) 60' | (substituted off) 66' |
| LW | 20 | Maximiliano Araújo |
| CF | 19 | Darwin Núñez | | (substituted off) 78' |
Substitutions:
| DF | 2 | José María Giménez | | (substituted on) 33' |
| DF | 3 | Sebastián Cáceres | | (substituted on) 46' |
| MF | 6 | Rodrigo Bentancur | | (substituted on) 66' |
| DF | 13 | Guillermo Varela | | (substituted on) 77' |
| MF | 10 | Giorgian de Arrascaeta | | (substituted on) 78' |
Manager:
(Argentina) Marcelo Bielsa

| GK | 1 | Alisson |
| RB | 2 | Danilo (c) |
| CB | 3 | Éder Militão |
| CB | 4 | Marquinhos |
| LB | 16 | Guilherme Arana |
| CM | 5 | Bruno Guimarães | | (substituted off) 87' |
| CM | 15 | João Gomes | (yellow card) 64' | (substituted off) 82' |
| RW | 11 | Raphinha | | (substituted off) 82' |
| AM | 8 | Lucas Paquetá | (yellow card) 39' | (substituted off) 81' |
| LW | 10 | Rodrygo | | (substituted off) 87' |
| CF | 9 | Endrick |
Substitutions:
| MF | 18 | Douglas Luiz | | (substituted on) 81' |
| FW | 20 | Savinho | | (substituted on) 82' |
| MF | 19 | Andreas Pereira | | (substituted on) 82' |
| FW | 22 | Gabriel Martinelli | | (substituted on) 87' |
| FW | 21 | Evanilson | | (substituted on) 87' |
Manager:
Dorival Júnior

Man of the Match:
Sergio Rochet (Uruguay)

Assistant referees:
Juan Pablo Belatti (Argentina)
Cristian Navarro (Argentina)
Fourth official:
Iván Barton (El Salvador)
Fifth official:
Henri Pupiro (Nicaragua)
Video assistant referee:
Guillermo Pacheco (Mexico)
Assistant video assistant referees:
Erick Miranda (Mexico)
Tatiana Guzmán (Nicaragua)

== Semi-finals ==
=== Argentina vs Canada ===
The teams had met twice before, including the tournament's opening game in Group A, which was won 2–0 by Argentina. Canada became the third CONCACAF team to reach the semi-finals of the Copa América in its tournament debut, following Mexico in 1993, and Honduras in 2001.

July 9, 2024
8:00 pm EDT (UTC−4)

| Argentina | 2–0 | Canada |
|---|---|---|
| Alvarez 22'; Messi 51' | Report (CONMEBOL); Report (CONCACAF) |

MetLife Stadium, East Rutherford, New Jersey
Attendance: 80,102
Referee: Piero Maza (Chile)

| Argentina | Canada |

| GK | 23 | Emiliano Martínez |
| RB | 4 | Gonzalo Montiel | | (substituted off) 71' |
| CB | 13 | Cristian Romero |
| CB | 25 | Lisandro Martínez |
| LB | 3 | Nicolás Tagliafico | | (substituted off) 64' |
| RM | 11 | Ángel Di María | | (substituted off) 78' |
| CM | 7 | Rodrigo De Paul |
| CM | 24 | Enzo Fernández |
| LM | 20 | Alexis Mac Allister | | (substituted off) 78' |
| CF | 10 | Lionel Messi (c) |
| CF | 9 | Julián Alvarez | | (substituted off) 78' |
Substitutions:
| DF | 19 | Nicolás Otamendi | | (substituted on) 64' |
| DF | 26 | Nahuel Molina | (yellow card) 88' | (substituted on) 71' |
| FW | 22 | Lautaro Martínez | | (substituted on) 78' |
| MF | 14 | Exequiel Palacios | | (substituted on) 78' |
| FW | 15 | Nicolás González | | (substituted on) 78' |
Manager:
Lionel Scaloni

| GK | 16 | Maxime Crépeau |
| RB | 2 | Alistair Johnston |
| CB | 15 | Moïse Bombito |
| CB | 13 | Derek Cornelius |
| LB | 19 | Alphonso Davies (c) | | (substituted off) 71' |
| RM | 22 | Richie Laryea | | (substituted off) 55' |
| CM | 8 | Ismaël Koné | (yellow card) 79' |
| CM | 7 | Stephen Eustáquio | (yellow card) 63' | (substituted off) 72' |
| LM | 14 | Jacob Shaffelburg | | (substituted off) 55' |
| CF | 10 | Jonathan David | (yellow card) 32' | (substituted off) 64' |
| CF | 9 | Cyle Larin |
Substitutions:
| FW | 23 | Liam Millar | | (substituted on) 55' |
| MF | 20 | Ali Ahmed | | (substituted on) 55' |
| FW | 25 | Tani Oluwaseyi | | (substituted on) 64' |
| MF | 21 | Jonathan Osorio | | (substituted on) 71' |
| MF | 24 | Mathieu Choinière | | (substituted on) 72' |
Manager:
| (United States) Jesse Marsch | | | (yellow card) 77' |

Man of the Match:
Lionel Messi (Argentina)

Assistant referees:
Claudio Urrutia (Chile)
José Retamal (Chile)
Fourth official:
Cristian Garay (Chile)
Fifth official:
Juan Serrano (Chile)
Video assistant referee:
Juan Lara (Chile)
Assistant video assistant referees:
Edson Cisternas (Chile)
Augusto Menéndez (Peru)
Rodrigo Carvajal (Chile)

=== Uruguay vs Colombia ===
The teams had met 45 times prior to this match, with 20 wins for Uruguay, 12 wins for Colombia, and 13 draws. Twelve of these encounters took place in the Copa América, with Uruguay winning six matches, Colombia three, and the other three ending in draws. Their most recent meeting was in October 2023, a 2–2 stalemate on Colombian soil in the 2026 FIFA World Cup qualification.

Colombia contested its ninth Copa America semi-final, of which it only advanced to the final twice. For its part, Uruguay returned to a semi-final for the first time since 2011, the edition in which it won its last title. This was the third Copa América semifinal between the sides, with both advancing to the final once in the previous two series: Colombia won 3–1 on aggregate in 1975 while Uruguay won 2–0 in 1995.

July 10, 2024
8:00 pm EDT (UTC−4)

| Uruguay | 0–1 | Colombia |
|---|---|---|
| | Report (CONMEBOL); Report (CONCACAF) | Lerma 39' |

Bank of America Stadium, Charlotte, North Carolina
Attendance: 70,644
Referee: César Ramos (Mexico)

| Uruguay | Colombia |

| GK | 1 | Sergio Rochet |
| CB | 3 | Sebastián Cáceres |
| CB | 2 | José Giménez | (yellow card) 69' |
| CB | 16 | Mathías Olivera | | (substituted off) 46' |
| CM | 15 | Federico Valverde (c) |
| CM | 5 | Manuel Ugarte |
| RM | 11 | Facundo Pellistri | | (substituted off) 46' |
| AM | 6 | Rodrigo Bentancur | | (substituted off) 34' |
| AM | 7 | Nicolás de la Cruz | (yellow card) 25' | (substituted off) 90' |
| LM | 20 | Maximiliano Araújo |
| CF | 19 | Darwin Núñez |
Substitutions:
| DF | 13 | Guillermo Varela | (yellow card) 63' | (substituted on) 34' (substituted off) 67' |
| FW | 25 | Cristian Olivera | | (substituted on) 46' |
| MF | 10 | Giorgian de Arrascaeta | | (substituted on) 46' |
| FW | 9 | Luis Suárez | | (substituted on) 67' |
| FW | 14 | Agustín Canobbio | | (substituted on) 90' |
Manager:
(Argentina) Marcelo Bielsa

| GK | 12 | Camilo Vargas |
| RB | 21 | Daniel Muñoz | (yellow card) 31' (yellow-red card) 45+1' |
| CB | 23 | Davinson Sánchez |
| CB | 2 | Carlos Cuesta | (yellow card) 90+7' |
| LB | 17 | Johan Mojica |
| CM | 6 | Richard Ríos | | (substituted off) 62' |
| CM | 16 | Jefferson Lerma |
| RW | 11 | Jhon Arias | | (substituted off) 46' |
| AM | 10 | James Rodríguez (c) | (yellow card) 55' | (substituted off) 62' |
| LW | 7 | Luis Díaz | | (substituted off) 86' |
| CF | 24 | Jhon Córdoba | | (substituted off) 75' |
Substitutions:
| DF | 4 | Santiago Arias | | (substituted on) 46' |
| MF | 15 | Mateus Uribe | | (substituted on) 62' |
| MF | 5 | Kevin Castaño | (yellow card) 90+6' | (substituted on) 62' |
| DF | 13 | Yerry Mina | | (substituted on) 75' |
| FW | 18 | Luis Sinisterra | | (substituted on) 86' |
Manager:
(Argentina) Néstor Lorenzo

Man of the Match:
James Rodríguez (Colombia)

Assistant referees:
Alberto Morín (Mexico)
Marco Bisguerra (Mexico)
Fourth official:
Mario Escobar (Guatemala)
Fifth official:
Humberto Panjoj (Guatemala)
Video assistant referee:
Carlos Orbe (Ecuador)
Assistant video assistant referees:
Cristhian Lescano (Ecuador)
Joel Alarcón (Peru)
Bryan Loayza (Ecuador)

== Third place play-off ==
The teams had met twice before, both in friendlies that Uruguay won: 3–1 in February 1986 and 2–0 in September 2022. This was thus their first competitive meeting.

July 13, 2024
8:00 pm EDT (UTC−4)

| Canada | 2–2 | Uruguay |
|---|---|---|
| Koné 22'; David 80' | Report (CONMEBOL); Report (CONCACAF) | Bentancur 8'; Suárez 90+2' |
Penalties
| David (penalty scored); Bombito (penalty scored); Koné (penalty missed); Choinière (penalty scored); Davies (penalty missed) | 3–4 | (penalty scored) Valverde; (penalty scored) Bentancur; (penalty scored) De Arrascaeta; (penalty scored) Suárez |

Bank of America Stadium, Charlotte, North Carolina
Attendance: 24,386
Referee: Alexis Herrera (Venezuela)

| Canada | Uruguay |

| GK | 1 | Dayne St. Clair | (yellow card) 90+3' |
| RB | 2 | Alistair Johnston | | (substituted off) 62' |
| CB | 3 | Luc de Fougerolles | (yellow card) 7' | (substituted off) 67' |
| CB | 15 | Moïse Bombito |
| LB | 22 | Richie Laryea (c) |
| CM | 8 | Ismaël Koné | (yellow card) 78' |
| CM | 24 | Mathieu Choinière |
| RW | 20 | Ali Ahmed | | (substituted off) 67' |
| AM | 21 | Jonathan Osorio | | (substituted off) 77' |
| LW | 14 | Jacob Shaffelburg |
| CF | 25 | Tani Oluwaseyi | (yellow card) 63' | (substituted off) 67' |
Substitutions:
| DF | 19 | Alphonso Davies | | (substituted on) 62' |
| DF | 13 | Derek Cornelius | | (substituted on) 67' |
| FW | 10 | Jonathan David | | (substituted on) 67' |
| FW | 23 | Liam Millar | | (substituted on) 77' |
| FW | 11 | Theo Bair | | (substituted on) 77' |
Manager:
(United States) Jesse Marsch

| GK | 1 | Sergio Rochet |
| RB | 8 | Nahitan Nández |
| CB | 2 | José Giménez (c) |
| CB | 3 | Sebastián Cáceres |
| LB | 17 | Matías Viña | (yellow card) 26' | (substituted off) 66' |
| CM | 15 | Federico Valverde |
| CM | 5 | Manuel Ugarte | | (substituted off) 46' |
| CM | 6 | Rodrigo Bentancur | (yellow card) 85' |
| RF | 11 | Facundo Pellistri | | (substituted off) 61' |
| CF | 19 | Darwin Núñez | | (substituted off) 46' |
| LF | 20 | Maximiliano Araújo | | (substituted off) 61' |
Substitutions:
| MF | 10 | Giorgian de Arrascaeta | | (substituted on) 46' |
| FW | 9 | Luis Suárez | | (substituted on) 46' |
| FW | 18 | Brian Rodríguez | | (substituted on) 61' |
| FW | 25 | Cristian Olivera | | (substituted on) 61' |
| DF | 24 | Lucas Olaza | | (substituted on) 66' |
Manager:
(Argentina) Marcelo Bielsa

Man of the Match:
Luis Suárez (Uruguay)

Assistant referees:
Lubin Torrealba (Venezuela)
Alberto Ponte (Venezuela)
Fourth official:
Gery Vargas (Bolivia)
Fifth official:
Bruno Boschilia (Brazilian)
Video assistant referee:
Derlis López (Paraguay)
Assistant video assistant referees:
Milcíades Saldívar (Paraguay)
Jhon León (Colombia)
Jhon Ospina (Colombia)

== Final ==
The teams had met 40 times prior to this match, with 20 wins for Argentina, 9 wins for Colombia, and 10 draws. Fifteen of these encounters took place in the Copa América, with Argentina winning seven matches, Colombia three, and the other four ending in draws. Their most recent meeting was in February 2022, an Argentina 1–0 win in the Estadio Mario Alberto Kempes, in Córdoba, in the 2022 FIFA World Cup qualification. The last Copa América meeting between the sides was a 1–1 draw in the previous edition semifinals in which Argentina won 3–2 on penalties.

Colombia was in its third Copa América final, having previously won the 2001 edition, which took place on home soil. Argentina was in back-to-back finals for the first time since its 2015 and 2016 run, and as defending champion, was seeking to retain the title for the first time since its 1993 Copa América triumph.

July 14, 2024
9:22 pm EDT (UTC−4) (Note: The kickoff time was delayed from the original time of 8:00 pm EDT.)

| Argentina | 1–0 (a.e.t.) | Colombia |
|---|---|---|
| La. Martínez 112' | Report (CONMEBOL); Report (CONCACAF) |

Hard Rock Stadium, Miami Gardens, Florida
Attendance: 65,300
Referee: Raphael Claus (Brazil)

| Argentina | Colombia |

| GK | 23 | Emiliano Martínez |
| RB | 4 | Gonzalo Montiel | | (substituted off) 72' |
| CB | 13 | Cristian Romero |
| CB | 25 | Lisandro Martínez |
| LB | 3 | Nicolás Tagliafico |
| RM | 11 | Ángel Di María | | (substituted off) 117' |
| CM | 7 | Rodrigo De Paul |
| CM | 24 | Enzo Fernández | | (substituted off) 97' |
| LM | 20 | Alexis Mac Allister | (yellow card) 61' | (substituted off) 97' |
| CF | 10 | Lionel Messi (c) | | (substituted off) 66' |
| CF | 9 | Julián Alvarez | | (substituted off) 97' |
Substitutions:
| FW | 15 | Nicolás González | | (substituted on) 66' |
| DF | 26 | Nahuel Molina | | (substituted on) 72' |
| FW | 22 | Lautaro Martínez | | (substituted on) 97' |
| MF | 5 | Leandro Paredes | | (substituted on) 97' |
| MF | 16 | Giovani Lo Celso | (yellow card) 118' | (substituted on) 97' |
| DF | 19 | Nicolás Otamendi | | (substituted on) 117' |
Manager:
Lionel Scaloni

| GK | 12 | Camilo Vargas |
| RB | 4 | Santiago Arias |
| CB | 23 | Davinson Sánchez |
| CB | 2 | Carlos Cuesta |
| LB | 17 | Johan Mojica |
| CM | 6 | Richard Ríos | | (substituted off) 89' |
| CM | 16 | Jefferson Lerma | | (substituted off) 106' |
| CM | 11 | Jhon Arias | | (substituted off) 106' |
| RF | 10 | James Rodríguez (c) | | (substituted off) 91' |
| CF | 24 | Jhon Córdoba | (yellow card) 27' | (substituted off) 89' |
| LF | 7 | Luis Díaz | | (substituted off) 106' |
Substitutions:
| FW | 19 | Rafael Santos Borré | | (substituted on) 89' |
| MF | 5 | Kevin Castaño | | (substituted on) 89' |
| MF | 20 | Juan Fernando Quintero | | (substituted on) 91' |
| MF | 15 | Mateus Uribe | | (substituted on) 106' |
| FW | 9 | Miguel Borja | (yellow card) 115' | (substituted on) 106' |
| MF | 8 | Jorge Carrascal | | (substituted on) 106' |
Manager:
(Argentina) Néstor Lorenzo

Man of the Match:
Ángel Di María (Argentina)

Assistant referees:
Bruno Pires (Brazil)
Rodrigo Correa (Brazil)
Fourth official:
Juan Gabriel Benítez (Paraguay)
Fifth official:
Eduardo Cardozo (Paraguay)
Video assistant referee:
Rodolpho Toski (Brazil)
Assistant video assistant referees:
Danilo Manis (Brazil)
Daniel Nobre (Brazil)
Pablo Gonçalves (Brazil)
