= 2024 Copa América Group A =

Soccer tournament group

Group A of the 2024 Copa América was one of four groups in the first stage of the tournament. The tournament involved national teams from CONMEBOL (South America) but also includes invited teams from the CONCACAF region (North, Central America and the Caribbean), that qualified via the 2023–24 CONCACAF Nations League.

The group was made up of defending, eventual, and incumbent world champions Argentina, Peru and Chile, all three from CONMEBOL, and Canada from CONCACAF. The draw for the groups was conducted on December 7, 2023, with Argentina being previously seeded into the group. The group's matches, which include the opening match of the tournament between Argentina and Canada, took place from June 20–29 at six venues in six U.S. cities.

The top two teams, following a round-robin of three matches per team, advanced to the quarter-finals.

== Teams ==
Draw position	Team	Pot	Confederation	Method of qualification	Appearances		Previous best performance	FIFA Rankings	
Draw position	Team	Pot	Confederation	Method of qualification	Total	Last	Previous best performance	November 2023 (Note: The rankings of November 2023 were used for seeding for the final draw, except for certain cases.)	June 2024
A1 (seed)	Argentina	1	CONMEBOL	Automatic qualifier	44th	2021	Winners (Fifteen times, last in 2021)	1	1
A2	Peru	2	CONMEBOL	Automatic qualifier	34th	2021	Winners (1939 and 1975)	35	31
A3	Chile	3	CONMEBOL	Automatic qualifier	41st	2021	Winners (2015 and 2016)	40	40
A4	Canada	4 (Note: As the identity of the CONCACAF 5 team was not known at the time of the groups draw, positions in the FIFA Rankings were not taken into account, and the placeholder in the draw was automatically seeded into pot 4.)	CONCACAF	CONCACAF play-in round winners	1st	None	Debut	48	48

== Standings ==
Pos	Team	Pld	W	D	L	GF	GA	GD	Pts	Qualification
1	Argentina	3	3	0	0	5	0	+5	9	Advance to knockout stage
2	Canada	3	1	1	1	1	2	−1	4	Advance to knockout stage
3	Chile	3	0	2	1	0	1	−1	2	
4	Peru	3	0	1	2	0	3	−3	1	

Source: CONMEBOL
Rules for classification: Tiebreakers

In the quarter-finals:

- The winner of Group A, Argentina, advanced to play the runner-up of Group B, Ecuador.
- The runner-up of Group A, Canada, advanced to play the winner of Group B, Venezuela.

== Matches ==
All kick-off times are local times, as listed by CONMEBOL.

=== Argentina vs Canada ===
The match marked Canada's debut in the Copa América, becoming the 20th team (10th outside of CONMEBOL teams) to compete in the tournament. The two teams had met only once before, a friendly match in May 2010 won 5–0 by Argentina.

June 20, 2024
8:00 pm EDT (UTC−4)

Argentina	2–0	Canada
Alvarez 49'; La. Martínez 88'	Report (CONMEBOL); Report (CONCACAF)

Mercedes-Benz Stadium, Atlanta, Georgia
Attendance: 70,564
Referee: Jesús Valenzuela (Venezuela)

Argentina	Canada

GK	23	Emiliano Martínez
RB	26	Nahuel Molina		(substituted off) 89'
CB	13	Cristian Romero
CB	25	Lisandro Martínez
LB	8	Marcos Acuña		(substituted off) 89'
RM	11	Ángel Di María		(substituted off) 68'
CM	7	Rodrigo De Paul	(yellow card) 61'
CM	5	Leandro Paredes		(substituted off) 77'
LM	20	Alexis Mac Allister
CF	10	Lionel Messi (c)
CF	9	Julián Alvarez		(substituted off) 76'
Substitutions:
MF	16	Giovani Lo Celso	(yellow card) 90+1'	(substituted on) 68'
FW	22	Lautaro Martínez		(substituted on) 76'
DF	19	Nicolás Otamendi		(substituted on) 77'
DF	3	Nicolás Tagliafico		(substituted on) 89'
DF	4	Gonzalo Montiel		(substituted on) 89'
Manager:
Lionel Scaloni

GK	16	Maxime Crépeau
RB	2	Alistair Johnston
CB	15	Moïse Bombito
CB	13	Derek Cornelius	(yellow card) 90+5'
LB	19	Alphonso Davies (c)
RM	17	Tajon Buchanan		(substituted off) 59'
CM	8	Ismaël Koné	(yellow card) 81'	(substituted off) 85'
CM	7	Stephen Eustáquio
LM	23	Liam Millar		(substituted off) 85'
CF	10	Jonathan David		(substituted off) 80'
CF	9	Cyle Larin
Substitutions:
FW	14	Jacob Shaffelburg		(substituted on) 59'
DF	22	Richie Laryea		(substituted on) 80'
MF	21	Jonathan Osorio		(substituted on) 85'
FW	12	Jacen Russell-Rowe		(substituted on) 85'
Manager:
(United States) Jesse Marsch

Man of the Match:
Julián Alvarez (Argentina)

Assistant referees:
Jorge Urrego (Venezuela)
Lubin Torrealba (Venezuela)
Fourth official:
Iván Barton (El Salvador)
Fifth official:
David Morán (El Salvador)
Video assistant referee:
Leodán González (Uruguay)
Assistant video assistant referee:
Richard Trinidad (Uruguay)

=== Peru vs Chile ===
The two teams had faced each other in 84 previous matches, including 21 times in the Copa América with eight wins for Chile, seven wins for Peru along with six draws. Their most recent encounter was a 2–0 home win for Chile in the 2026 FIFA World Cup qualification in October 2023.

June 21, 2024
7:00 pm CDT (UTC−5)

Peru	0–0	Chile
	Report (CONMEBOL); Report (CONCACAF)

AT&T Stadium, Arlington, Texas
Attendance: 43,030
Referee: Wilton Sampaio (Brazil)

Peru	Chile

GK	1	Pedro Gallese
CB	15	Miguel Araujo
CB	5	Carlos Zambrano	(yellow card) 18'
CB	22	Alexander Callens		(substituted off) 84'
DM	16	Wilder Cartagena
CM	8	Sergio Peña
CM	23	Piero Quispe		(substituted off) 71'
RW	7	Andy Polo		(substituted off) 84'
LW	17	Luis Advíncula (c)		(substituted off) 35'
CF	14	Gianluca Lapadula
CF	20	Edison Flores		(substituted off) 71'
Substitutions:
DF	6	Marcos López		(substituted on) 35'
FW	25	Joao Grimaldo		(substituted on) 71'
FW	9	Paolo Guerrero		(substituted on) 71'
DF	19	Oliver Sonne		(substituted on) 84'
DF	2	Luis Abram		(substituted on) 84'
Manager:
(Uruguay) Jorge Fossati

GK	1	Claudio Bravo (c)
RB	4	Mauricio Isla
CB	16	Igor Lichnovsky
CB	5	Paulo Díaz
LB	2	Gabriel Suazo
CM	7	Marcelino Núñez		(substituted off) 85'
CM	13	Erick Pulgar	(yellow card) 22'
RW	9	Víctor Dávila	(yellow card) 47'	(substituted off) 65'
AM	10	Alexis Sánchez	(yellow card) 79'
LW	15	Diego Valdés		(substituted off) 46'
CF	11	Eduardo Vargas		(substituted off) 65'
Substitutions:
FW	8	Darío Osorio		(substituted on) 46'
FW	19	Marcos Bolados		(substituted on) 65'
FW	22	Ben Brereton Díaz		(substituted on) 65'
MF	18	Rodrigo Echeverría		(substituted on) 85'
Manager:
(Argentina) Ricardo Gareca

Man of the Match:
Alexis Sánchez (Chile)

Assistant referees:
Bruno Pires (Brazil)
Bruno Boschilia (Brazil)
Fourth official:
Edina Alves (Brazil)
Fifth official:
Neuza Back (Brazil)
Video assistant referee:
Rodolpho Toski (Brazil)
Assistant video assistant referee:
Daniel Nobre (Brazil)

=== Peru vs Canada ===
The two teams had met once before, a friendly match won 2–0 by Peru in September 2010. Another precedent between both sides is a friendly match won 3–1 by Canada in 1988; however, this encounter was not considered an international "A" match by FIFA as Peru had fielded their U19 team.

Shortly before the end of the first half, assistant referee Humberto Panjoj suffered a decompensation apparently due to the high temperatures in the stadium 32 degrees (91 °F) with a feels-like temperature of 38 (101 °F) with 51% humidity, so he had to leave for medical attention and was replaced by fifth official Ricardo Baren. With the 1–0 win, Canada achieved their third ever victory over a CONMEBOL opponent, the last time being a 2–0 over Colombia in the 2000 CONCACAF Gold Cup final.

June 25, 2024
5:00 pm CDT (UTC−5)

Peru	0–1	Canada
	Report (CONMEBOL); Report (CONCACAF)	David 74'

Children's Mercy Park, Kansas City, Kansas
Attendance: 15,625
Referee: Mario Escobar (Guatemala)

Peru	Canada

GK	1	Pedro Gallese
CB	15	Miguel Araujo	(red card) 59'
CB	5	Carlos Zambrano (c)		(substituted off) 78'
CB	22	Alexander Callens
DM	16	Wilder Cartagena
CM	8	Sergio Peña		(substituted off) 79'
CM	23	Piero Quispe		(substituted off) 62'
RW	7	Andy Polo
LW	6	Marcos López
CF	14	Gianluca Lapadula		(substituted off) 70'
CF	20	Edison Flores		(substituted off) 62'
Substitutions:
DF	4	Anderson Santamaría		(substituted on) 62'
FW	11	Bryan Reyna		(substituted on) 62'
FW	9	Paolo Guerrero		(substituted on) 70'
MF	10	Christian Cueva		(substituted on) 78'
FW	18	André Carrillo		(substituted on) 79'
Manager:
(Uruguay) Jorge Fossati

GK	16	Maxime Crépeau
RB	2	Alistair Johnston
CB	15	Moïse Bombito
CB	13	Derek Cornelius		(substituted off) 46'
LB	22	Richie Laryea	(yellow card) 20'	(substituted off) 66'
CM	8	Ismaël Koné		(substituted off) 46'
CM	7	Stephen Eustáquio
RW	23	Liam Millar		(substituted off) 46'
AM	10	Jonathan David
LW	19	Alphonso Davies (c)
CF	9	Cyle Larin		(substituted off) 82'
Substitutions:
DF	4	Kamal Miller		(substituted on) 46'
FW	14	Jacob Shaffelburg		(substituted on) 46'
MF	21	Jonathan Osorio		(substituted on) 46'
FW	17	Tajon Buchanan		(substituted on) 66'
FW	25	Tani Oluwaseyi		(substituted on) 82'
Manager:
(United States) Jesse Marsch

Man of the Match:
Jonathan David (Canada)

Assistant referees:
Luis Ventura (Guatemala)
Humberto Panjoj (Guatemala)
Fourth official:
Augusto Aragón (Ecuador)
Fifth official:
Ricardo Baren (Ecuador)
Video assistant referee:
Juan Soto (Venezuela)
Assistant video assistant referee:
Gery Vargas (Bolivia)

=== Chile vs Argentina ===
The two teams had faced each other in 90 previous matches, including 29 times in the Copa América with a wide advantage for Argentina who won 21 of those matches with 8 draws and no Chilean victories, although Chile won on penalties in the two finals they played in 2015 and 2016. Their most recent meeting was a 2–1 home win for Argentina in the 2022 FIFA World Cup qualification in January 2022.

June 25, 2024
9:00 pm EDT (UTC−4)

Chile	0–1	Argentina
	Report (CONMEBOL); Report (CONCACAF)	La. Martínez 88'

MetLife Stadium, East Rutherford, New Jersey
Attendance: 81,106
Referee: Andrés Matonte (Uruguay)

Chile	Argentina

GK	1	Claudio Bravo (c)
RB	4	Mauricio Isla	(yellow card) 82'	(substituted off) 88'
CB	16	Igor Lichnovsky
CB	5	Paulo Díaz
LB	2	Gabriel Suazo	(yellow card) 55'
CM	13	Erick Pulgar		(substituted off) 76'
CM	18	Rodrigo Echeverría
RW	8	Darío Osorio
AM	10	Alexis Sánchez		(substituted off) 66'
LW	9	Víctor Dávila
CF	11	Eduardo Vargas		(substituted off) 88'
Substitutions:
FW	19	Marcos Bolados		(substituted on) 66'
MF	7	Marcelino Núñez		(substituted on) 76'
DF	26	Nicolás Fernández		(substituted on) 88'
FW	22	Ben Brereton Díaz		(substituted on) 88'
Manager:
(Argentina) Ricardo Gareca

GK	23	Emiliano Martínez
RB	26	Nahuel Molina	(substituted off) 83'
CB	13	Cristian Romero
CB	25	Lisandro Martínez
LB	3	Nicolás Tagliafico	(substituted off) 83'
RM	7	Rodrigo De Paul
CM	20	Alexis Mac Allister
CM	24	Enzo Fernández	(substituted off) 64'
LM	15	Nicolás González	(substituted off) 73'
CF	10	Lionel Messi (c)
CF	9	Julián Alvarez	(substituted off) 73'
Substitutions:
MF	16	Giovani Lo Celso	(substituted on) 64'
FW	11	Ángel Di María	(substituted on) 73'
FW	22	Lautaro Martínez	(substituted on) 73'
DF	8	Marcos Acuña	(substituted on) 83'
DF	4	Gonzalo Montiel	(substituted on) 83'
Manager:
Lionel Scaloni

Man of the Match:
Claudio Bravo (Chile)

Assistant referees:
Nicolás Tarán (Uruguay)
Carlos Barreiro (Uruguay)
Fourth official:
Gustavo Tejera (Uruguay)
Fifth official:
Pablo Llarena (Uruguay)
Video assistant referee:
Carlos Orbe (Ecuador)
Assistant video assistant referee:
Cristhian Lescano (Ecuador)

=== Argentina vs Peru ===
The two teams had faced each other in 54 previous matches, including 17 times in the Copa América with 12 wins for Argentina, three wins for Peru along with two draws. Their most recent meeting was a 2–0 away win for Argentina in the 2026 FIFA World Cup qualification in October 2023.

With the 2–0 defeat, Peru was eliminated in the group stage for the first time since 1995, snapping a streak of 10 consecutive tournaments advancing to the knockout stage. Peru also left the tournament without scoring a goal for the first time in its history.

June 29, 2024
8:00 pm EDT (UTC−4)

Argentina	2–0	Peru
La. Martínez 47', 86'	Report (CONMEBOL); Report (CONCACAF)

Hard Rock Stadium, Miami Gardens, Florida
Attendance: 64,972
Referee: César Ramos (Mexico)

Argentina	Peru

GK	23	Emiliano Martínez
RB	4	Gonzalo Montiel
CB	6	Germán Pezzella		(substituted off) 83'
CB	19	Nicolás Otamendi
LB	3	Nicolás Tagliafico
CM	16	Giovani Lo Celso		(substituted off) 66'
CM	5	Leandro Paredes	(yellow card) 68'	(substituted off) 77'
CM	14	Exequiel Palacios
RF	11	Ángel Di María (c)		(substituted off) 77'
CF	22	Lautaro Martínez
LF	17	Alejandro Garnacho		(substituted off) 66'
Substitutions:
MF	24	Enzo Fernández		(substituted on) 66'
FW	15	Nicolás González		(substituted on) 66'
FW	21	Valentín Carboni		(substituted on) 77'
MF	18	Guido Rodríguez		(substituted on) 77'
DF	2	Lucas Martínez Quarta		(substituted on) 83'
Manager:
Pablo Aimar

GK	1	Pedro Gallese
CB	3	Aldo Corzo
CB	5	Carlos Zambrano	(yellow card) 88'
CB	22	Alexander Callens
RM	19	Oliver Sonne
CM	16	Wilder Cartagena	(yellow card) 36'	(substituted off) 46'
CM	8	Sergio Peña
LM	6	Marcos López		(substituted off) 78'
AM	20	Edison Flores	(yellow card) 53'	(substituted off) 56'
AM	11	Bryan Reyna		(substituted off) 63'
CF	9	Paolo Guerrero (c)	(yellow card) 28'	(substituted off) 56'
Substitutions:
MF	13	Jesús Castillo		(substituted on) 46'
FW	14	Gianluca Lapadula		(substituted on) 56'
FW	24	José Rivera		(substituted on) 56'
FW	26	Franco Zanelatto		(substituted on) 63'
MF	10	Christian Cueva	(yellow card) 90+5'	(substituted on) 78'
Manager:
(Uruguay) Jorge Fossati

Man of the Match:
Lautaro Martínez (Argentina)

Assistant referees:
Alberto Morín (Mexico)
Marco Bisguerra (Mexico)
Fourth official:
Alexis Herrera (Venezuela)
Fifth official:
Lubin Torrealba (Venezuela)
Video assistant referee:
Guillermo Pacheco (Mexico)
Assistant video assistant referee:
Erik Miranda (Mexico)

=== Canada vs Chile ===
The two teams had met in four previous matches, all of them friendlies, with two wins for Chile, one victory for Canada and one draw. The two most recent were the 2–1 and 2–0 Chilean victories in May and October 1995, respectively.

With the scoreless draw, Canada secured its place in the quarterfinals and became the third CONCACAF team to advance to the knockout stage in its tournament debut. For Chile, it was its first group stage exit since 2004 and the first time they left the tournament without scoring a goal since 1917.

June 29, 2024
8:00 pm EDT (UTC−4)

Canada	0–0	Chile
	Report (CONMEBOL); Report (CONCACAF)

Inter&Co Stadium, Orlando, Florida
Attendance: 24,481
Referee: Wilmar Roldán (Colombia)

Canada	Chile

GK	16	Maxime Crépeau
RB	2	Alistair Johnston	(yellow card) 57'
CB	15	Moïse Bombito	(yellow card) 7'
CB	13	Derek Cornelius
LB	19	Alphonso Davies (c)	(yellow card) 42'
CM	21	Jonathan Osorio
CM	7	Stephen Eustáquio
RW	22	Richie Laryea		(substituted off) 76'
AM	10	Jonathan David		(substituted off) 90+4'
LW	14	Jacob Shaffelburg		(substituted off) 65'
CF	9	Cyle Larin		(substituted off) 76'
Substitutions:
FW	23	Liam Millar	(yellow card) 66'	(substituted on) 65'
FW	17	Tajon Buchanan		(substituted on) 76'
FW	25	Tani Oluwaseyi	(yellow card) 79'	(substituted on) 76'
DF	4	Kamal Miller		(substituted on) 90+4'
Manager:
(United States) Jesse Marsch

GK	12	Gabriel Arias
RB	4	Mauricio Isla
CB	16	Igor Lichnovsky
CB	3	Guillermo Maripán
LB	2	Gabriel Suazo	(yellow card) 12' (yellow-red card) 27'
CM	7	Marcelino Núñez		(substituted off) 46'
CM	18	Rodrigo Echeverría		(substituted off) 82'
RW	8	Darío Osorio		(substituted off) 30'
AM	10	Alexis Sánchez (c)
LW	9	Víctor Dávila		(substituted off) 77'
CF	11	Eduardo Vargas		(substituted off) 46'
Substitutions:
DF	6	Thomas Galdames		(substituted on) 30'
MF	13	Erick Pulgar		(substituted on) 46'
FW	19	Marcos Bolados		(substituted on) 46'
FW	22	Ben Brereton Díaz		(substituted on) 77'
MF	24	César Pérez		(substituted on) 82'
Manager:
(Argentina) Ricardo Gareca

Man of the Match:
Alexis Sánchez (Chile)

Assistant referees:
Alexander Guzmán (Colombia)
Jhon León (Colombia)
Fourth official:
Jhon Ospina (Colombia)
Fifth official:
Corey Parker (United States)
Video assistant referee:
Armando Villarreal (United States)
Assistant video assistant referee:
Yadir Acuña (Colombia)
