= Franco Zanelatto =

Peruvian footballer (born 2000)

Personal information
- Full name: Franco Zanelatto Téllez
- Date of birth: 9 May 2000 (age 26)
- Place of birth: Asunción, Paraguay
- Height: 1.75 m (5 ft 9 in)
- Position: Winger

Team information
- Current team: FBC Melgar
- Number: 77

Youth career
- Marcet Football

Senior career*
Years	Team	Apps	(Gls)
2019–2021	USMP	34	(5)
2022	Alianza Atlético	28	(7)
2023–2024	Alianza Lima	31	(4)
2025	OFI	5	(0)
2026–	Melgar	0	(0)

International career^{‡}
2023–	Peru	6	(0)
- * Club domestic league appearances and goals as of 21:30, 30 August 2025 (UTC) ‡ National team caps and goals as of 23:22, 29 June 2024 (UTC)

Franco Zanelatto Téllez (born 9 May 2000) is a professional footballer who plays as a winger for Liga 1 (Peru) club Melgar. Born in Paraguay, he represents Peru at international level.

== Early life ==
Zanelatto is the son of a Uruguayan father and a Paraguayan mother. He was born in Asunción, Paraguay on May 9 2000.

== Club career ==
=== Universidad San Martin de Porres ===
Zanelatto started his professional career with Peruvian side Universidad San Martin de Porres in 2019.

=== Alianza Atletico ===
Zanelatto would be transferred to Alianza Atlético for the 2022 Liga 1 season.

=== Alianza Lima ===
In 2023, he would leave Alianza Atletico and joined Alianza Lima. With Alianza, he would participate in the 2023 Copa Libertadores and win the Torneo Apertura of the Liga 1. He would be in the starting lineup for the 2023 Liga 1 final against rivals Universitario which would result in a loss.

== International career ==
Zanelatto would be called up by Juan Reynoso to play in the 2026 FIFA World Cup qualifiers in October 2023 with Peru. He would make his debut against Argentina. He is among the new generation of players in the squad along with Piero Quispe and Joao Grimaldo.

== Style of play ==
Zanelatto mainly operates as a winger and is known for his speed.

== Personal life ==
Zanelatto has been nicknamed "Zane".

== Career statistics ==
As of 10 May 2025

Club	Season	League			Cup		Continental		Total	
Club	Season	Division	Apps	Goals	Apps	Goals	Apps	Goals	Apps	Goals
Universidad San Martín de Porres	2019	Peruvian Primera División	1	0	0	0	—		1	0
Universidad San Martín de Porres	2020	Peruvian Primera División	18	1	0	0	—		18	1
Universidad San Martín de Porres	2021	Peruvian Primera División	15	4	0	0	—		15	4
Universidad San Martín de Porres	Total		34	5	0	0	0	0	34	5
Alianza Atlético	2022	Peruvian Primera División	28	7	0	0	—		28	7
Alianza Lima	2023	Peruvian Primera División	19	4	0	0	5	0	19	4
Alianza Lima	2024	Peruvian Primera División	4	0	0	0	—		4	0
Alianza Lima	Total		23	4	0	0	5	0	28	4
OFI	2024–25	Super League Greece	4	0	—		—		4	0
OFI	2025–26	Super League Greece	0	0	0	0	—		0	0
OFI	Total		4	0	0	0	—		4	0
Career total			88	16	0	0	5	0	93	16

=== International ===
As of match played 29 June 2024

Appearances and goals by national team and year
National team	Year	Apps	Goals
Peru	2023	3	0
Peru	2024	3	0
Total		6	0
