= Fernando Batista =

Argentine football player and manager

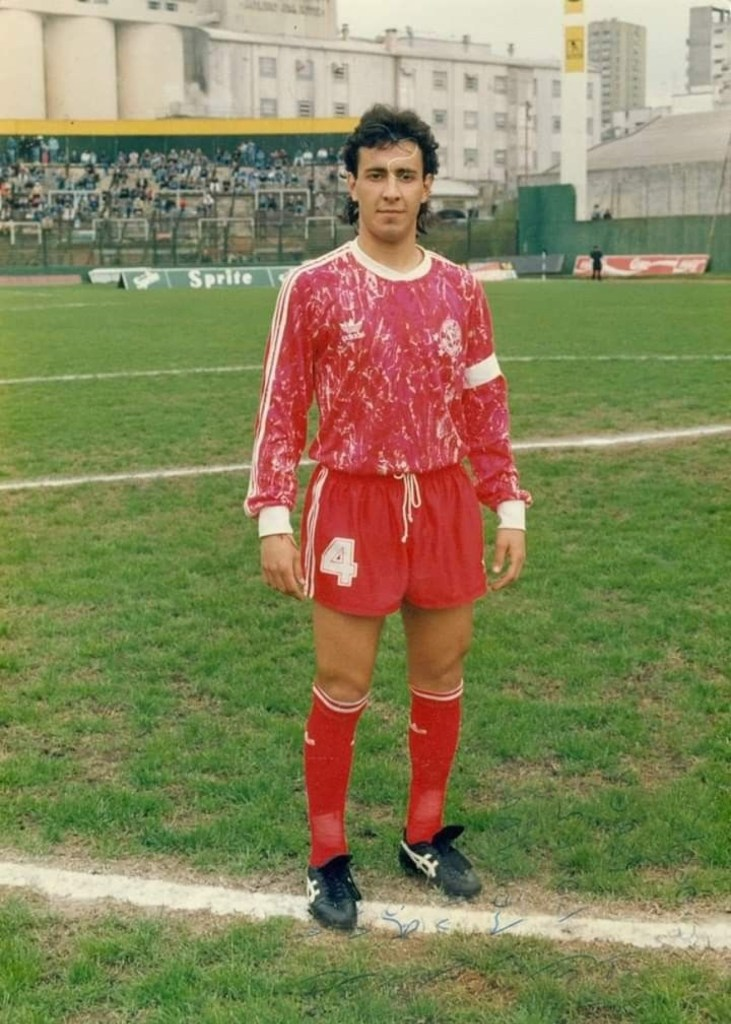
- Batista as a player of Argentinos Juniors in 1989

Personal information
- Full name: Fernando Ariel Batista
- Date of birth: 20 August 1970 (age 56)
- Place of birth: Buenos Aires, Argentina
- Position: Defender

Youth career
- Argentinos Juniors

Senior career*
Years	Team	Apps	(Gls)
1989–1993	Argentinos Juniors	134	(4)
1993–1995	San Lorenzo	36	(0)
1997–1998	Godoy Cruz	23	(1)
1998–2001	All Boys	59	(3)

International career
1989	Argentina U20		

Managerial career
- 2004–2007: San Lorenzo (youth)
- 2008–2016: Argentinos Juniors (youth)
- 2017: Argentina U20 (assistant)
- 2018: Armenia U18
- 2018: Armenia U19
- 2019–2021: Argentina U20
- 2019–2021: Argentina U23
- 2022–2023: Venezuela U23
- 2023–2025: Venezuela
- 2026: Costa Rica
- * Club domestic league appearances and goals

Fernando Ariel Batista (born 20 August 1970) is an Argentine football manager and former player who played as a defender. He most recently managed the Costa Rica national team.

== Playing career ==
Born in Buenos Aires, Batista started his playing career with Argentine top flight side Argentinos Juniors, where he made 134 league appearances and scored four goals. He moved to San Lorenzo in 1993, playing for two seasons at the club.

In 1997, Batista signed for Godoy Cruz in the Argentine second division. He joined All Boys in the following year, playing for three seasons before retiring in 2001, aged 30.

== International career ==
Batista represented Argentina at under-20 level at the 1989 FIFA World Youth Championship.

== Managerial career ==
=== Early career ===
Batista began his coaching career with the youth sides of San Lorenzo, joining the club in 2004. He returned to Argentinos Juniors in 2008, being a youth coach and coordinator until 2016.

In 2017, Batista was a part of Claudio Úbeda's staff at the Argentina national under-20 team, being his assistant in the 2017 South American U-20 Championship and the 2017 FIFA U-20 World Cup. In January 2018, he was appointed manager of the Armenia national under-19 team.

On 20 December 2018, Batista returned to Argentina's under-20 side, being appointed manager in the place of Lionel Scaloni who had just been promoted to the full side. He finished second in the 2019 South American U-20 Championship, qualifying the nation to the 2019 FIFA U-20 World Cup, where they were knocked out by Mali in the round of 16.

Batista was also in charge of the under-23 team in the 2020 Summer Olympics, with Argentina being knocked out in the group stage. He departed his role as under-20 and under-23 manager on 30 November 2021.

=== Venezuela national team ===
After departing the Argentina youth sides, Batista joined José Pékerman's staff at the Venezuela national team; an assistant of the full side, he was also named manager of the under-23 squad. He led the side to the final of the 2022 Maurice Revello Tournament, losing to hosts France.

On 10 March 2023, Batista was appointed manager of the Venezuela national team, replacing Pékerman. His first match in charge of the side occurred on 15 June, a 1–0 friendly win over Honduras, and he ended the year with only one loss in eight official matches, notably leaving the side in the fourth position of the 2026 FIFA World Cup qualifiers.

Batista led the Vinotinto to a perfect group stage in the 2024 Copa América, winning all three matches against Ecuador, Mexico and Jamaica. However, his side was knocked out by Canada on penalties in the quarterfinals.

After a 6-3 loss to Colombia during the final matchday of the World Cup qualifiers that eliminated Venezuela, Batista was fired and replaced by Oswaldo Vizcarrondo.

=== Costa Rica national team ===
On 28 February 2026, Batista was announced by the Costa Rican Football Federation as the head coach of their national team, eliminated from the World Cup under Miguel Herrera, whom he replaced. His debut match with Costa Rica was a 2–2 draw against Jordan, his only match not to end in a loss. Subsequent friendlies saw heavy defeats against Iran (5–0) a few days later, and then in June against Colombia (3–1) and England (3–0). The March and June international windows were marred by out-of-field incidents, mainly surrounding Alejandro Bran, though other teammates like Kenneth Vargas and Warren Madrigal were also named. Batista expelled all three from his call-ups.

Controversy followed during the September 2026 window. First, Batista omitted players Kenay Myrie, Keylor Navas, and Juan Pablo Vargas from his call-up. On 24 September, as part of the 2026–27 CONCACAF Nations League A, the first match saw Costa Rica overpowering Curaçao 3–0 in the first half. However, as Batista implemented defensive substitutions early in the second half, the advantage was quickly reverted into a 3–4 defeat, angering fans in attendance who began shouting for his dismissal. The next day, the Costa Rican Federation's executive committee evaluated Batista's role, but decided to keep him as sporting director Rónald González backed him. However, on 27 September, Costa Rica suffered yet another loss under Batista, a 2–0 defeat to Haiti. With only a draw in six games (a performance of only 5,5%), Batista was sacked by the Costa Rican Federation and replaced by former captain Bryan Ruiz.

Batista's short and negative stint in Costa Rica attracted particular attention in Venezuela, as the memory of their elimination from the 2026 FIFA World Cup remained recent. NTN24's Luis Cifuentes noted that Venezuelan fans on social media expressed "We told [the Costa Ricans] so" but that "at least they reacted in time." La Teja's Hillary Chinchilla echoed that various Venezuelan journalists praised the Costa Ricans for reacting against Batista quicker than they did.

== Personal life ==
Batista's older brother Sergio was also a footballer and a manager. Their father José was an important figure in the history of Club Parque. His daughter Tatiana got engaged to fellow footballer Kevin Mac Allister, the second son of Carlos Mac Allister, in 2024, and married on 14 June, 2025.

== Managerial statistics ==
As of match played 27 September 2026

Team	From	To	Record				
Team	From	To	G	W	D	L	Win %
Armenia U18	1 January 2018	31 October 2018	2	0	0	2	0.00
Armenia U19	1 July 2018	31 October 2018	5	1	0	4	20.00
Argentina U20	1 January 2019	30 November 2021	22	14	1	7	63.64
Argentina U23	1 August 2019	8 August 2021	18	12	4	2	66.67
Venezuela	10 March 2023	10 September 2025	29	10	9	10	34.48
Costa Rica	26 February 2026	28 September 2026	6	0	1	5	0.00
Total			81	37	15	29	45.68
