= 2024 Copa América =

48th edition of the Copa América

CONMEBOL Copa América USA 2024
- Vibra el Continente (Vibra o Continente); English: Rocking the Continent

Tournament details
- Host country: United States
- Dates: June 20 – July 14
- Teams: 16 (from 2 confederations)
- Venues: 14 (in 14 host cities)

Final positions
- Champions: Argentina (16th title)
- Runners-up: Colombia
- Third place: Uruguay
- Fourth place: Canada

Tournament statistics
- Matches played: 32
- Goals scored: 70 (2.19 per match)
- Attendance: 1,571,878 (49,121 per match)
- Top scorer(s): (Argentina) Lautaro Martínez (5 goals)
- Best player: (Colombia) James Rodríguez
- Best goalkeeper: (Argentina) Emiliano Martínez
- Fair play award: Colombia

The 2024 Copa América was the 48th edition of the Copa América, the quadrennial international men's soccer championship organized by South America's football ruling body CONMEBOL. The tournament was held in the United States from June 20 to July 14, 2024, and was co-organized by CONCACAF.

This was the second time that the United States hosted the tournament, having hosted the Copa América Centenario in 2016. Argentina was the defending champion, and won a record sixteenth title after defeating Colombia 1–0 after extra time in the final, which was played on July 14, 2024, at Hard Rock Stadium in Miami Gardens, Florida.

== Host selection ==
The 2024 Copa América had been expected to be hosted by Ecuador because of CONMEBOL's host rotation order. However, it was held in the United States because CONMEBOL president Alejandro Domínguez said Ecuador had been nominated but not yet chosen to organize the edition. In November 2022, the country declined to host the tournament. Peru and the United States had both expressed interest in organizing the tournament.

On January 27, 2023, it was announced that, as part of CONCACAF and CONMEBOL's new strategic partnership, the United States would host the tournament with six CONCACAF guest teams qualifying through the 2023–24 CONCACAF Nations League. The tournament also acted as a prelude to the 2026 FIFA World Cup, of which the United States would also be a joint host along with Canada and Mexico.

== Venues ==
All of the stadiums were existing venues. The opening match was held at Mercedes-Benz Stadium in Atlanta, Georgia, while the final was held at Hard Rock Stadium in Miami Gardens, Florida. Both venues were announced on November 20, 2023. All other stadiums were selected and announced on December 4, 2023.

List of host cities and stadiums
Arlington, Texas (Dallas/Fort Worth Area)	Atlanta, Georgia	Austin, Texas
AT&T Stadium	Mercedes-Benz Stadium	Q2 Stadium
Capacity: 80,000	Capacity: 71,000	Capacity: 20,730
Charlotte, North Carolina	East Rutherford, New Jersey (New York City Area)	Houston, Texas
Bank of America Stadium	MetLife Stadium	NRG Stadium
Capacity: 74,860	Capacity: 82,560	Capacity: 72,220
Inglewood, California (Los Angeles Area)	Santa Clara, California (San Francisco Bay Area)	Glendale, Arizona (Phoenix Area)
SoFi Stadium	Levi's Stadium	State Farm Stadium
Capacity: 70,240	Capacity: 68,500	Capacity: 63,400
Paradise, Nevada (Las Vegas Area)	Kansas City, Missouri	Kansas City, Kansas
Allegiant Stadium	Arrowhead Stadium	Children's Mercy Park
Capacity: 61,000	Capacity: 76,410	Capacity: 18,460
Miami Gardens, Florida (Miami Area)		Orlando, Florida
Hard Rock Stadium		Inter&Co Stadium
Capacity: 64,760		Capacity: 25,500

Location of the host cities of the 2024 Copa América.

- 1 Arlington, TX
- 2 Atlanta, GA
- 3 Austin, TX
- 4 Charlotte, NC
- 5 East Rutherford, NJ
- 6 Glendale, AZ
- 7 Houston, TX
- 8 Inglewood, CA
- 9 Kansas City, KS
- 10 Kansas City, MO
- 11 Paradise, NV
- 12 Miami Gardens, FL
- 13 Orlando, FL
- 14 Santa Clara, CA

=== Team base camps ===
Each team chose a "team base camp" for its stay between the matches. The teams trained and resided in these locations throughout the tournament, travelling to games staged away from their bases. The "team base camp" needed to be in the United States.

Base camp and training ground by team—sortable
Team	Base camp	Training ground
Argentina	Fort Lauderdale, Florida	Chase Stadium
Bolivia		
Brazil	Bay Lake, Florida	ESPN Wide World of Sports Complex
Canada		
Chile		
Colombia		
Costa Rica		
Ecuador	Santa Clara, California	Santa Clara Youth Soccer Park
Jamaica		
Mexico		
Panama		
Paraguay		
Peru		
United States	Bethesda, Maryland	Landon School
Uruguay	Palm Beach Gardens, Florida	Gardens North County District Park
Venezuela	San Jose, California	San Jose State University

== Teams ==
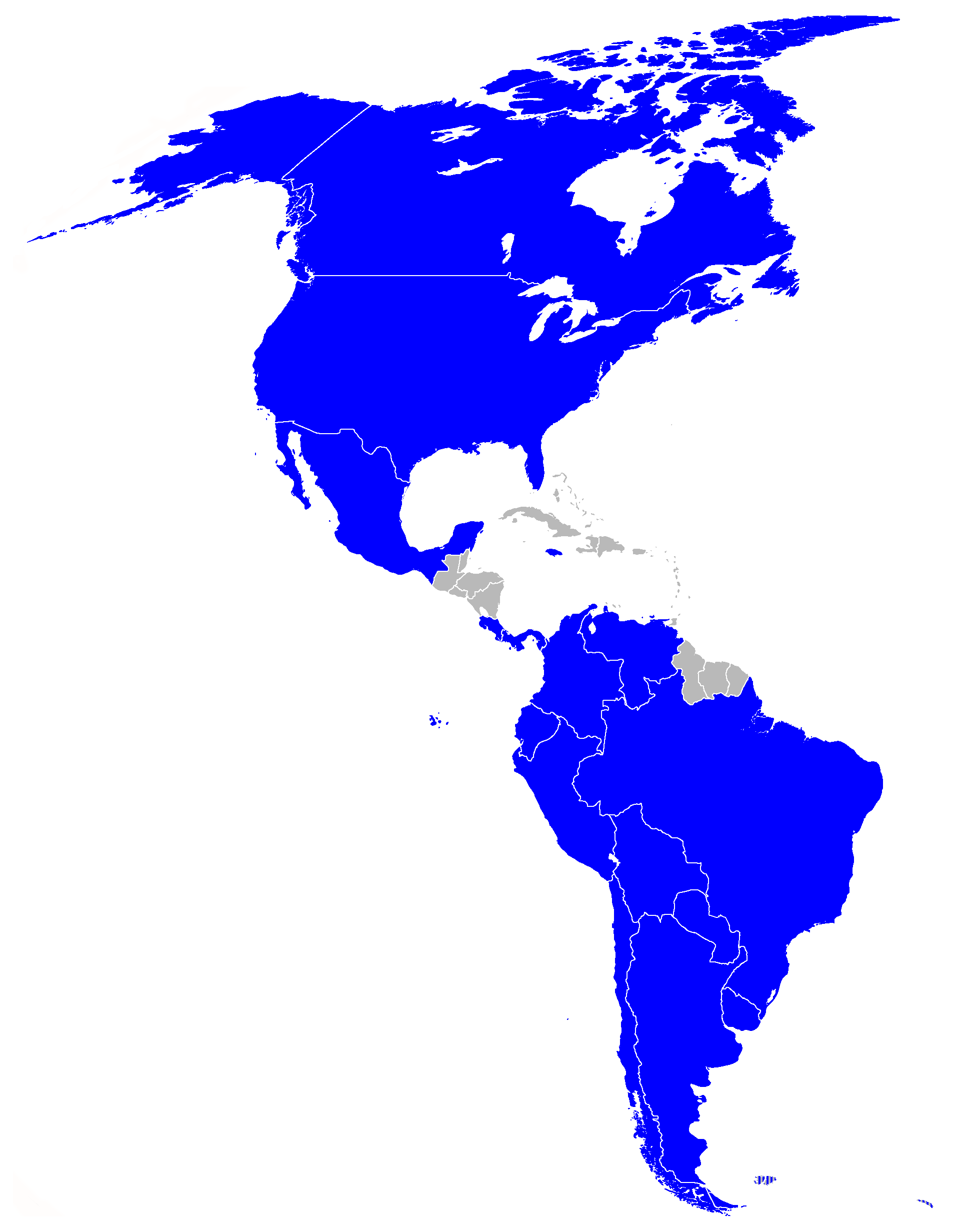
Map of the participant countries.

=== Qualification ===
The tournament included sixteen teams: ten from CONMEBOL and six from CONCACAF. All ten CONMEBOL national teams were eligible to enter.

The six CONCACAF participants qualified through the 2023–24 CONCACAF Nations League. The teams were the four League A quarter-final winners, and two play-off round winners between the four losing quarter-finalists. Unlike the Copa América Centenario, the United States did not qualify automatically despite being the hosts, but still secured a berth as one of League A quarter-final winners, following a 4–2 aggregate win against Trinidad and Tobago.

CONMEBOL (10 teams)	CONCACAF (6 teams)
Argentina (title holders); Bolivia; Brazil; Chile; Colombia; Ecuador; Paraguay; Peru; Uruguay; Venezuela	Jamaica (2023–24 CONCACAF Nations League top 4); Mexico (2023–24 CONCACAF Nations League top 4); Panama (2023–24 CONCACAF Nations League top 4); United States (2023–24 CONCACAF Nations League top 4); Canada (play-in round winners); Costa Rica (play-in round winners)

=== Draw ===
The group stage draw was held on December 7, 2023, at 19:30 EST (UTC−5) in the James L. Knight Center in Miami, Florida. The sixteen teams were drawn into four groups of four, by selecting one team from each of the four ranked pots.

For the draw, the four teams in Pot 1 were pre-seeded into their respective groups, determined as follows:

- The reigning Copa América champions, Argentina, were seeded into Group A
- The reigning CONCACAF Gold Cup champions, Mexico, were seeded into Group B
- The highest ranked CONCACAF team in the October 2023 FIFA World Rankings, the United States, was seeded into Group C
- The highest ranked CONMEBOL team (after Argentina) in the October 2023 FIFA World Rankings, Brazil, was seeded into Group D

The remaining 12 teams were placed into Pots 2–4 according to their October 2023 World Rankings, with placeholders for the two CONCACAF participants yet to be determined at the time of the draw each being automatically placed into Pot 4.

For the draw, the competition rules stated that no group could have more than three CONMEBOL teams or more than two CONCACAF teams. If this condition was not met during the draw, the team moved to the next available group in alphabetical order.

==== Seeding ====
Pot 1
Team	Rank
Argentina	1
Mexico	14
United States (host)	12
Brazil	5

Pot 2
Team	Rank
Uruguay	11
Colombia	15
Ecuador	32
Peru	35

Pot 3
Team	Rank
Chile	40
Panama	41
Venezuela	49
Paraguay	53

Pot 4
Team	Rank
Jamaica	55
Bolivia	85
Canada (Note: Team was competing in the qualifying play-offs and was not known at the time of the draw)	50
Costa Rica	54

==== Draw ====
Group A
Pos	Team
A1	Argentina
A2	Peru
A3	Chile
A4	Canada (Note: Team was competing in the qualifying play-offs and was not known at the time of the draw)

Group B
Pos	Team
B1	Mexico
B2	Ecuador
B3	Venezuela
B4	Jamaica

Group C
Pos	Team
C1	United States
C2	Uruguay
C3	Panama
C4	Bolivia

Group D
Pos	Team
D1	Brazil
D2	Colombia
D3	Paraguay
D4	Costa Rica

== Squads ==
The maximum squad size of the teams was increased from the original quota of 23 to 26 players. Teams had to provide the list containing a minimum of 23 players and a maximum of 26 by the deadline of June 15.

== Match officials ==
On May 24, 2024, CONMEBOL announced 101 referees for the tournament. Referees were from CONMEBOL, CONCACAF, and UEFA because of the continuation of the UEFA–CONMEBOL memorandum of understanding. Italian official Maurizio Mariani, with his assistants Daniele Brindoni and Alberto Tegoni, along with Marco Di Bello and Aleandro Di Paolo (VAR), represented UEFA. This was the first edition of the Copa América to feature female referees. Four referees from the 2023 FIFA Women's World Cup final were incorporated, including Tori Penso and her assistants Brooke Mayo and Kathryn Nesbitt, as well as VAR official Tatiana Guzmán. Edina Alves and assistants Neuza Back, Mary Blanco, Migdalia Rodríguez also took part in the tournament.

Association	Referees	Assistant referees	Video assistant referees
Argentina	Darío Herrera; Yael Falcón	Juan Pablo Belatti; Cristian Navarro; Facundo Rodríguez; Maximiliano del Yesso	Mauro Vigliano; Silvio Trucco; Héctor Paletta
Bolivia	Ivo Méndez	José Antelo; Edwar Saavedra	Gery Vargas
Brazil	Wilton Sampaio; Raphael Claus; Edina Alves	Danilo Manis; Rodrigo Correa; Bruno Boschilia; Bruno Pires; Neuza Back	Rodolpho Toski; Daniel Nobre; Pablo Gonçalves
Chile	Piero Maza; Cristián Garay	Claudio Urrutia; Miguel Rocha; José Retamal; Juan Serrano	Juan Lara; Rodrigo Carvajal; Edson Cisternas
Colombia	Wilmar Roldán; Jhon Ospina	Alexander Guzmán; Jhon León; Jhon Gallego; Miguel Roldán; Mary Blanco	Nicolás Gallo; Yadir Acuña; David Rodríguez
Ecuador	Augusto Aragón	Cristhian Lescano; Ricardo Baren	Carlos Orbe; Bryan Loayza
Guatemala	Mario Escobar	Luis Ventura; Humberto Panjoj	
Italy	Maurizio Mariani	Daniele Bindoni; Alberto Tegoni	Marco Di Bello; Aleandro Di Paolo
Mexico	César Ramos	Alberto Morín; Marco Bisguerra	Erik Miranda; Guillermo Pacheco
Nicaragua			Tatiana Guzmán
Paraguay	Juan Gabriel Benítez	Eduardo Cardozo; Milcíades Saldívar	Derlis López; Eduardo Britos; José Cuevas
Peru	Kevin Ortega	Michael Orué; Stephen Atoche	Joel Alarcón; Jonny Bossio; Augusto Menéndez
El Salvador	Iván Barton	David Morán; Henri Pupiro	
Uruguay	Andrés Matonte; Gustavo Tejera	Nicolás Tarán; Martín Soppi; Carlos Barreiro; Pablo Llarena	Leodán González; Richard Trinidad; Cristhian Ferreyra
United States	Ismail Elfath; Tori Penso	Corey Parker; Kyle Atkins; Brooke Mayo; Kathryn Nesbitt	Armando Villarreal
Venezuela	Jesús Valenzuela; Alexis Herrera	Jorge Urrego; Alberto Ponte; Lubin Torrealba; Migdalia Rodríguez	Juan Soto; Carlos López

== Group stage ==
The top two teams of each group advanced to the quarter-finals.

Tiebreakers

The ranking of teams in the group stage was determined as follows (Regulations Article 24):

1. Points obtained in all group matches (three points for a win, one for a draw, none for a defeat);
2. Goal difference in all group matches;
3. Number of goals scored in all group matches;
4. Points obtained in the matches played between the teams in question;
5. Goal difference in the matches played between the teams in question;
6. Number of goals scored in the matches played between the teams in question;
7. Fewest red cards;
8. Fewest yellow cards;
9. Drawing of lots.

=== Group A ===
Pos	Team	Pld	W	D	L	GF	GA	GD	Pts	Qualification
1	Argentina	3	3	0	0	5	0	+5	9	Advance to knockout stage
2	Canada	3	1	1	1	1	2	−1	4	Advance to knockout stage
3	Chile	3	0	2	1	0	1	−1	2	
4	Peru	3	0	1	2	0	3	−3	1	

Source: CONMEBOL
June 20, 2024
8:00 pm EDT (UTC−4)

Argentina	2–0	Canada
Alvarez 49'; La. Martínez 88'	Report (CONMEBOL); Report (CONCACAF)

Mercedes-Benz Stadium, Atlanta, Georgia
Attendance: 70,564
Referee: Jesús Valenzuela (Venezuela)
June 21, 2024
7:00 pm CDT (UTC−5)

Peru	0–0	Chile
	Report (CONMEBOL); Report (CONCACAF)

AT&T Stadium, Arlington, Texas
Attendance: 43,030
Referee: Wilton Sampaio (Brazil)

June 25, 2024
5:00 pm CDT (UTC−5)

Peru	0–1	Canada
	Report (CONMEBOL); Report (CONCACAF)	David 74'

Children's Mercy Park, Kansas City, Kansas
Attendance: 15,625
Referee: Mario Escobar (Guatemala)
June 25, 2024
9:00 pm EDT (UTC−4)

Chile	0–1	Argentina
	Report (CONMEBOL); Report (CONCACAF)	La. Martínez 88'

MetLife Stadium, East Rutherford, New Jersey
Attendance: 81,106
Referee: Andrés Matonte (Uruguay)

June 29, 2024
8:00 pm EDT (UTC−4)

Argentina	2–0	Peru
La. Martínez 47', 86'	Report (CONMEBOL); Report (CONCACAF)

Hard Rock Stadium, Miami Gardens, Florida
Attendance: 64,972
Referee: César Ramos (Mexico)
June 29, 2024
8:00 pm EDT (UTC−4)

Canada	0–0	Chile
	Report (CONMEBOL); Report (CONCACAF)

Inter&Co Stadium, Orlando, Florida
Attendance: 24,481
Referee: Wilmar Roldán (Colombia)

=== Group B ===
Pos	Team	Pld	W	D	L	GF	GA	GD	Pts	Qualification
1	Venezuela	3	3	0	0	6	1	+5	9	Advance to knockout stage
2	Ecuador	3	1	1	1	4	3	+1	4	Advance to knockout stage
3	Mexico	3	1	1	1	1	1	0	4	
4	Jamaica	3	0	0	3	1	7	−6	0	

Source: CONMEBOL
June 22, 2024
3:00 pm PDT (UTC−7)

Ecuador	1–2	Venezuela
Sarmiento 40'	Report (CONMEBOL); Report (CONCACAF)	Cádiz 64'; Bello 74'

Levi's Stadium, Santa Clara, California
Attendance: 29,864
Referee: Wilmar Roldán (Colombia)
June 22, 2024
8:00 pm CDT (UTC−5)

Mexico	1–0	Jamaica
Arteaga 69'	Report (CONMEBOL); Report (CONCACAF)

NRG Stadium, Houston, Texas
Attendance: 53,763
Referee: Ismail Elfath (United States)

June 26, 2024
3:00 pm PDT (UTC−7)

Ecuador	3–1	Jamaica
Hincapié 13'; Páez 45+4' (pen.); Minda 90+1'	Report (CONMEBOL); Report (CONCACAF)	Antonio 54'

Allegiant Stadium, Paradise, Nevada
Attendance: 24,074
Referee: Cristián Garay (Chile)
June 26, 2024
6:00 pm PDT (UTC−7)

Venezuela	1–0	Mexico
Rondón 57' (pen.)	Report (CONMEBOL); Report (CONCACAF)

SoFi Stadium, Inglewood, California
Attendance: 72,773
Referee: Raphael Claus (Brazil)

June 30, 2024
5:00 pm MST (UTC−7)

Mexico	0–0	Ecuador
	Report (CONMEBOL); Report (CONCACAF)

State Farm Stadium, Glendale, Arizona
Attendance: 62,565
Referee: Mario Escobar (Guatemala)
June 30, 2024
7:00 pm CDT (UTC−5)

Jamaica	0–3	Venezuela
	Report (CONMEBOL); Report (CONCACAF)	Bello 49'; Rondón 56'; Ramírez 85'

Q2 Stadium, Austin, Texas
Attendance: 20,240
Referee: Maurizio Mariani (Italy)

=== Group C ===
Pos	Team	Pld	W	D	L	GF	GA	GD	Pts	Qualification
1	Uruguay	3	3	0	0	9	1	+8	9	Advance to knockout stage
2	Panama	3	2	0	1	6	5	+1	6	Advance to knockout stage
3	United States (H)	3	1	0	2	3	3	0	3	
4	Bolivia	3	0	0	3	1	10	−9	0	

Source: CONMEBOL
(H) Hosts
June 23, 2024
5:00 pm CDT (UTC−5)

United States	2–0	Bolivia
Pulisic 3'; Balogun 44'	Report (CONMEBOL); Report (CONCACAF)

AT&T Stadium, Arlington, Texas
Attendance: 47,873
Referee: Maurizio Mariani (Italy)
June 23, 2024
9:00 pm EDT (UTC−4)

Uruguay	3–1	Panama
M. Araújo 16'; Núñez 85'; Viña 90+1'	Report (CONMEBOL); Report (CONCACAF)	Murillo 90+5'

Hard Rock Stadium, Miami Gardens, Florida
Attendance: 33,425
Referee: Piero Maza (Chile)

June 27, 2024
6:00 pm EDT (UTC−4)

Panama	2–1	United States
Blackman 26'; Fajardo 83'	Report (CONMEBOL); Report (CONCACAF)	Balogun 22'

Mercedes-Benz Stadium, Atlanta, Georgia
Attendance: 59,145
Referee: Iván Barton (El Salvador)
June 27, 2024
9:00 pm EDT (UTC−4)

Uruguay	5–0	Bolivia
Pellistri 8'; Núñez 21'; M. Araújo 77'; Valverde 81'; Bentancur 89'	Report (CONMEBOL); Report (CONCACAF)

MetLife Stadium, East Rutherford, New Jersey
Attendance: 48,033
Referee: Juan Gabriel Benítez (Paraguay)

July 1, 2024
8:00 pm CDT (UTC−5)

United States	0–1	Uruguay
	Report (CONMEBOL); Report (CONCACAF)	M. Olivera 66'

Arrowhead Stadium, Kansas City, Missouri
Attendance: 55,460
Referee: Kevin Ortega (Peru)
July 1, 2024
9:00 pm EDT (UTC−4)

Bolivia	1–3	Panama
Miranda 69'	Report (CONMEBOL); Report (CONCACAF)	Fajardo 22'; Guerrero 79'; Yanis 90+1'

Inter&Co Stadium, Orlando, Florida
Attendance: 16,129
Referee: Edina Alves (Brazil)

=== Group D ===
Pos	Team	Pld	W	D	L	GF	GA	GD	Pts	Qualification
1	Colombia	3	2	1	0	6	2	+4	7	Advance to knockout stage
2	Brazil	3	1	2	0	5	2	+3	5	Advance to knockout stage
3	Costa Rica	3	1	1	1	2	4	−2	4	
4	Paraguay	3	0	0	3	3	8	−5	0	

Source: CONMEBOL
June 24, 2024
5:00 pm CDT (UTC−5)

Colombia	2–1	Paraguay
Muñoz 32'; Lerma 42'	Report (CONMEBOL); Report (CONCACAF)	Enciso 69'

NRG Stadium, Houston, Texas
Attendance: 67,059
Referee: Darío Herrera (Argentina)
June 24, 2024
6:00 pm PDT (UTC−7)

Brazil	0–0	Costa Rica
	Report (CONMEBOL); Report (CONCACAF)

SoFi Stadium, Inglewood, California
Attendance: 67,158
Referee: César Ramos (Mexico)

June 28, 2024
3:00 pm MST (UTC−7)

Colombia	3–0	Costa Rica
Díaz 31' (pen.); Sánchez 59'; Córdoba 62'	Report (CONMEBOL); Report (CONCACAF)

State Farm Stadium, Glendale, Arizona
Attendance: 27,386
Referee: Gustavo Tejera (Uruguay)
June 28, 2024
6:00 pm PDT (UTC−7)

Paraguay	1–4	Brazil
Alderete 48'	Report (CONMEBOL); Report (CONCACAF)	Vinícius 35', 45+5'; Savinho 43'; Paquetá 65' (pen.)

Allegiant Stadium, Paradise, Nevada
Attendance: 46,939
Referee: Piero Maza (Chile)

July 2, 2024
6:00 pm PDT (UTC−7)

Brazil	1–1	Colombia
Raphinha 12'	Report (CONMEBOL); Report (CONCACAF)	Muñoz 45+2'

Levi's Stadium, Santa Clara, California
Attendance: 70,971
Referee: Jesús Valenzuela (Venezuela)
July 2, 2024
8:00 pm CDT (UTC−5)

Costa Rica	2–1	Paraguay
Calvo 3'; Alcócer 7'	Report (CONMEBOL); Report (CONCACAF)	Sosa 55'

Q2 Stadium, Austin, Texas
Attendance: 12,765
Referee: Yael Falcón (Argentina)

== Knockout stage ==
In the pre-final knockout stage matches (quarter-finals, semi-finals, and third place play-off), no extra time was played and any draws were immediately resolved via penalties. In the final, if the score was level after 90 minutes, two extra time periods of 15 minutes each were to be played. If still level, the match was to be decided by a penalty shoot-out.

=== Bracket ===
Quarter-finals
July 4 – Houston, TX
Argentina (p)	1 (4)
Ecuador	1 (2)
July 5 – Arlington, TX
Venezuela	1 (3)
Canada (p)	1 (4)
July 6 – Paradise, NV
Uruguay (p)	0 (4)
Brazil	0 (2)
July 6 – Glendale, AZ
Colombia	5
Panama	0

Semi-finals
July 9 – East Rutherford, NJ
Argentina	2
Canada	0
July 10 – Charlotte, NC
Uruguay	0
Colombia	1

Final
July 14 – Miami Gardens, FL
Argentina (a.e.t.)	1
Colombia	0
Third place play-off
July 13 – Charlotte, NC
Canada	2 (3)
Uruguay (p)	2 (4)

=== Quarter-finals ===
July 4, 2024
8:00 pm CDT (UTC−5)

Argentina	1–1	Ecuador
Li. Martínez 35'	Report (CONMEBOL); Report (CONCACAF)	Rodríguez 90+2'
Penalties
Messi (penalty missed); Alvarez (penalty scored); Mac Allister (penalty scored); Montiel (penalty scored); Otamendi (penalty scored)	4–2	(penalty missed) Mena; (penalty missed) Minda; (penalty scored) Yeboah; (penalty scored) J. Caicedo

NRG Stadium, Houston, Texas
Attendance: 69,456
Referee: Andrés Matonte (Uruguay)

July 5, 2024
8:00 pm CDT (UTC−5)

Venezuela	1–1	Canada
Rondón 65'	Report (CONMEBOL); Report (CONCACAF)	Shaffelburg 13'
Penalties
Rondón (penalty scored); Herrera (penalty missed); Rincón (penalty scored); Savarino (penalty missed); Cádiz (penalty scored); Ángel (penalty missed)	3–4	(penalty scored) David; (penalty missed) Millar; (penalty scored) Bombito; (penalty missed) Eustáquio; (penalty scored) Davies; (penalty scored) Koné

AT&T Stadium, Arlington, Texas
Attendance: 51,080
Referee: Wilton Sampaio (Brazil)

July 6, 2024
3:00 pm MST (UTC−7)

Colombia	5–0	Panama
Córdoba 8'; Rodríguez 15' (pen.); Díaz 41'; Ríos 70'; Borja 90+4' (pen.)	Report (CONMEBOL); Report (CONCACAF)

State Farm Stadium, Glendale, Arizona
Attendance: 39,740
Referee: Maurizio Mariani (Italy)

July 6, 2024
6:00 pm PDT (UTC−7)

Uruguay	0–0	Brazil
	Report (CONMEBOL); Report (CONCACAF)
Penalties
Valverde (penalty scored); Bentancur (penalty scored); De Arrascaeta (penalty scored); Giménez (penalty missed); Ugarte (penalty scored)	4–2	(penalty missed) Militão; (penalty scored) Pereira; (penalty missed) Douglas Luiz; (penalty scored) Martinelli

Allegiant Stadium, Paradise, Nevada
Attendance: 55,770
Referee: Darío Herrera (Argentina)

=== Semi-finals ===
July 9, 2024
8:00 pm EDT (UTC−4)

Argentina	2–0	Canada
Alvarez 22'; Messi 51'	Report (CONMEBOL); Report (CONCACAF)

MetLife Stadium, East Rutherford, New Jersey
Attendance: 80,102
Referee: Piero Maza (Chile)

July 10, 2024
8:00 pm EDT (UTC−4)

Uruguay	0–1	Colombia
	Report (CONMEBOL); Report (CONCACAF)	Lerma 39'

Bank of America Stadium, Charlotte, North Carolina
Attendance: 70,644
Referee: César Ramos (Mexico)

=== Third place play-off ===
July 13, 2024
8:00 pm EDT (UTC−4)

Canada	2–2	Uruguay
Koné 22'; David 80'	Report (CONMEBOL); Report (CONCACAF)	Bentancur 8'; Suárez 90+2'
Penalties
David (penalty scored); Bombito (penalty scored); Koné (penalty missed); Choinière (penalty scored); Davies (penalty missed)	3–4	(penalty scored) Valverde; (penalty scored) Bentancur; (penalty scored) De Arrascaeta; (penalty scored) Suárez

Bank of America Stadium, Charlotte, North Carolina
Attendance: 24,386
Referee: Alexis Herrera (Venezuela)

=== Final ===
Due to security incidents around and within Hard Rock Stadium, the match was initially delayed by 30 minutes, ultimately starting 82 minutes after its scheduled time.

July 14, 2024
9:22 pm EDT (UTC−4) (Note: The kickoff time was delayed from the original time of 8:00 pm EDT.)

Argentina	1–0 (a.e.t.)	Colombia
La. Martínez 112'	Report (CONMEBOL); Report (CONCACAF)

Hard Rock Stadium, Miami Gardens, Florida
Attendance: 65,300
Referee: Raphael Claus (Brazil)

== Statistics ==
=== Goalscorers ===
There were 70 goals scored in 32 matches, for an average of 2.19 goals per match.

5 goals

- (Argentina) Lautaro Martínez

3 goals

- (Venezuela) Salomón Rondón

2 goals

- (Argentina) Julián Alvarez
- (Brazil) Vinícius Júnior
- (Canada) Jonathan David
- (Colombia) Jhon Córdoba
- (Colombia) Luis Díaz
- (Colombia) Jefferson Lerma
- (Colombia) Daniel Muñoz
- (Panama) José Fajardo
- (United States) Folarin Balogun
- (Uruguay) Maximiliano Araújo
- (Uruguay) Rodrigo Bentancur
- (Uruguay) Darwin Núñez
- (Venezuela) Eduard Bello

1 goal

- (Argentina) Lisandro Martínez
- (Argentina) Lionel Messi
- (Bolivia) Bruno Miranda
- (Brazil) Lucas Paquetá
- (Brazil) Raphinha
- (Brazil) Savinho
- (Canada) Ismaël Koné
- (Canada) Jacob Shaffelburg
- (Colombia) Miguel Borja
- (Colombia) Richard Ríos
- (Colombia) James Rodríguez
- (Colombia) Davinson Sánchez
- (Costa Rica) Josimar Alcócer
- (Costa Rica) Francisco Calvo
- (Ecuador) Piero Hincapié
- (Ecuador) Alan Minda
- (Ecuador) Kendry Páez
- (Ecuador) Kevin Rodríguez
- (Ecuador) Jeremy Sarmiento
- (Jamaica) Michail Antonio
- (Mexico) Gerardo Arteaga
- (Panama) César Blackman
- (Panama) Eduardo Guerrero
- (Panama) Michael Amir Murillo
- (Panama) César Yanis
- (Paraguay) Omar Alderete
- (Paraguay) Julio Enciso
- (Paraguay) Ramón Sosa
- (United States) Christian Pulisic
- (Uruguay) Mathías Olivera
- (Uruguay) Facundo Pellistri
- (Uruguay) Luis Suárez
- (Uruguay) Federico Valverde
- (Uruguay) Matías Viña
- (Venezuela) Jhonder Cádiz
- (Venezuela) Eric Ramírez

=== Discipline ===
Player	Offense(s)	Suspension(s)
(Ecuador) Enner Valencia	(red card) in Group B vs Venezuela (matchday 1; June 22, 2024)	Group B vs Jamaica (matchday 2; June 26, 2024)
(Peru) Miguel Araujo	(red card) in Group A vs Canada (matchday 2; June 25, 2024)	Group A vs Argentina (matchday 3; June 29, 2024)
(United States) Timothy Weah	(red card) in Group C vs Panama (matchday 2; June 27, 2024)	Group C vs Uruguay (matchday 3; July 1, 2024) (Note: Weah was handed a two-match ban, with the second match of the suspension to be served outside the tournament.)
(Panama) Adalberto Carrasquilla	(red card) in Group C vs United States (matchday 2; June 27, 2024)	Group C vs Bolivia (matchday 3; July 1, 2024); Quarter-finals vs Colombia (July 6, 2024)
(Costa Rica) Manfred Ugalde	(yellow card) in Group D vs Brazil (matchday 1; June 24, 2024); (yellow card) in Group D vs Colombia (matchday 2; June 28, 2024)	Group D vs Paraguay (matchday 3; July 2, 2024)
(Paraguay) Andrés Cubas	(red card) in Group D vs Brazil (matchday 2; June 28, 2024)	Group D vs Costa Rica (matchday 3; July 2, 2024)
(Chile) Gabriel Suazo	(yellow card) (yellow-red card) in Group A vs Canada (matchday 3; June 29, 2024)	Suspension served outside the tournament
(Venezuela) Darwin Machís	(yellow card) in Group B vs Ecuador (matchday 1; June 22, 2024); (yellow card) in Group B vs Jamaica (matchday 3; June 30, 2024)	Quarter-finals vs Canada (July 5, 2024)
(Brazil) Vinícius Júnior	(yellow card) in Group D vs Paraguay (matchday 2; June 28, 2024); (yellow card) in Group D vs Colombia (matchday 3; July 2, 2024)	Quarter-finals vs Uruguay (July 6, 2024)
(Colombia) Jefferson Lerma	(yellow card) in Group D vs Paraguay (matchday 1; June 24, 2024); (yellow card) in Group D vs Brazil (matchday 3; July 2, 2024)	Quarter-finals vs Panama (July 6, 2024)
(Uruguay) Nahitan Nández	(red card) in Quarter-finals vs Brazil (July 6, 2024)	Semi-finals vs Colombia (July 10, 2024)
(Uruguay) Nicolás de la Cruz	(yellow card) in Quarter-finals vs Brazil (July 6, 2024); (yellow card) in Semi-finals vs Colombia (July 10, 2024)	Third place play-off vs Canada (July 13, 2024)
(Colombia) Daniel Muñoz	(yellow card) (yellow-red card) in Semi-finals vs Uruguay (July 10, 2024)	Final vs Argentina (July 14, 2024)
(Uruguay) Guillermo Varela	(red card) in Semi-finals vs Colombia (July 10, 2024)	Third place play-off vs Canada (July 13, 2024)

=== Awards ===
The following awards were given at the conclusion of the tournament.

- Best Player Award: (Colombia) James Rodríguez
- Golden Boot Award: (Argentina) Lautaro Martínez (5 goals)
- Best Goalkeeper Award: (Argentina) Emiliano Martínez
- Fair Play Award: Colombia

==== Team of the Tournament ====
The team of the tournament was announced on July 31, 2024.

Goalkeeper	Defenders	Midfielders	Forwards
(Argentina) Emiliano Martínez	(Ecuador) Piero Hincapié (Colombia) Davinson Sánchez (Argentina) Cristian Romero (Canada) Alistair Johnston	(Colombia) James Rodríguez (Uruguay) Manuel Ugarte (Argentina) Rodrigo De Paul	(Brazil) Raphinha (Argentina) Lautaro Martínez (Argentina) Lionel Messi

== Marketing ==
=== Sponsorships ===
- Absolut Sport
- Betano
- BYD Auto
- Coca-Cola
- Delta Air Lines (US) and LATAM Airlines (Latin America and Brazil)
- Decolar.com/Despegar.com
- Gran Centenario
- Inter Rapidísimo
- Lowe's
- Mastercard
- Mercado Livre/Mercado Libre
- Michelob ULTRA
- Puma
- TCL
- Unilever

=== Merchandise ===
Copa América content was added to EA Sports FC 24's Ultimate Team and EA Sports FC Mobile in June 2024, although a standalone tournament mode was not made available in the game.

The Panini Group produced thematic stickers and a sticker album for this edition of the Copa América. Stickers were produced for all the Copa América teams, as well as Honduras and Trinidad and Tobago, the teams that failed to qualify for the main draw through the play-offs.

=== Broadcasting rights ===
Territory	Broadcaster(s)	Ref.
Afghanistan	SOLH TV	
Albania	MCN TV	
Argentina	Telefe, TyC Sports, DSports, Televisión Pública	
Aruba	Telearuba	
Australia	Optus Sport	
Austria	Sportdigital	
Balkans	Arena Sport	
Bangladesh	T Sports and Toffee	
Bolivia	Unitel Bolivia	
Brazil	Grupo Globo	
Brunei	Astro	
Bulgaria	Max Sport	
Canada	CTV-TSN (in English), RDS (in French)	
Caribbean	C Sport	
Chile	Canal 13, Chilevisión	
China	CCTV and Tencent QQ	
Colombia	Caracol, RCN, DSports	
Costa Rica	Teletica	
Denmark	Viaplay	
El Salvador	TCS	
Estonia	Viaplay	
Fiji	FBC	
Finland	Viaplay	
France	L'Équipe	
Georgia	Setanta Sports	
Germany	Sportdigital	
Greece	ANT1	
Guatemala	TV Azteca and Claro TV	
Honduras	Canal 11	
Hong Kong	i-CABLE HOY	
Hungary	Arena4	
Iceland	Viaplay	
Indonesia	Emtek	
Iran	IRIB TV3, IRIB Varzesh	
Ireland	Premier Sports	
Italy	Sportitalia and Mola	
Jamaica	CVM	
Japan	Prime Video	
Kazakhstan	QAZTRK	
Latvia	Viaplay	
Lithuania	Viaplay	
Malaysia	Astro	
Mexico	TelevisaUnivision, TV Azteca	
Netherlands	Viaplay	
New Zealand	TVNZ	
Nicaragua	Viva Nicaragua	
Norway	Viaplay	
Pacific Islands	Digicel	
Pakistan	PTV Sports,	
Papua New Guinea	NBC	
Paraguay	Unicanal, Telefuturo, SNT	
Peru	América TV, DSports	
Poland	Viaplay	
Portugal	Sport TV	
Romania	Digi Sport	
Russia	Okko Sport	
Slovakia	RTVS and STVR	
South Korea	TVING	
Spain	Movistar Plus+, CCMA	
Sub-Saharan Africa	StarTimes Sports (English) and Canal+ (French)	
Sweden	Viaplay	
Switzerland	Sportdigital	
Tajikistan	TV Varzish, TV Football	
Turkey	TV8.5, Exxen	
United Kingdom	Premier Sports	
United States	Fox Sports (English); TUDN (Spanish)	
Uruguay	TV Ciudad, AUF TV, and DSports	
Uzbekistan	Setanta Sports	
Venezuela	Televen	
Vietnam	Next Media, K+, VTC	

== Symbols ==
=== Mascot ===
The tournament's official mascot was unveiled on December 7, 2023, during the group stage draw. It was an eagle named "Capitán", the Spanish word for captain. The inspiration for the choice of an eagle as the mascot for the 2024 Copa América, was "born from the symbolism that this majestic animal has in various cultures of the Americas, illustrating strength, boldness, and excellence."

=== Match ball ===
The match balls of this tournament were provided by Puma for the first time after twenty years of partnership with Nike ended in 2023. The "Puma Cumbre" was unveiled during the draw for the group stage of the competition on December 7, 2023.

=== Music ===
Due to unknown reasons, an official song for the tournament was never released. It was believed that a customized version of "Puntería" by Colombian singer Shakira would serve as the official song of the tournament, however such version was never released. It was later understood that Puntería was instead to be used for TUDN's coverage of the tournament, not as the official song, effectively leaving Copa America 2024 without an official song. Subsequently, Darude's "Sandstorm" became the "unofficial" song as the tournament progressed, mainly as it grew popular among fans who played it at fanfests and stadiums.

== Controversies and incidents ==
=== Pitch quality ===
The tournament's pitch dimensions and grass surface was met with significant controversy amongst fans, players, and commentators alike. The smaller pitch sizes in the venues of the tournament, with most of them being used for American football, measured 110 yards (100 m) by 70 yards (64 m), compared to FIFA's standard of 115 yards (105 m) by 74 yards (68 m), was reported to likely influence the dynamics of the game, leading to more closely contested matches. In addition, grass cultivated in specially selected nurseries was attached to plastic layers that adhered to the field's surface. It was transported by truck and laid down with meticulous attention to detail, considering factors like watering, sunlight, and the delivery routes of the trucks, according to a statement issued by CONMEBOL. Frederico Nantes, CONMEBOL's director of competitions, stated that the dimensions and capacity of soccer-specific MLS venues influenced the decision to restrict their usage during the tournament. Factors such as venue size, travel distances between cities, and infrastructure were carefully evaluated before CONMEBOL concluded that the use of artificial turf was unavoidable, despite player concerns about that playing surface.

After the inaugural match of the tournament, Argentina vs Canada at Mercedes-Benz Stadium, Argentina head coach Lionel Scaloni and first-choice goalkeeper Emiliano Martínez called the newly installed grass surface a "disaster" in a post-game interview. "They knew seven months ago that we'd play here and they changed the field two days ago," Scaloni said. "It's not an excuse, but this isn't a good field. Sincerely, the field is not apt for these kinds of players. We gave not necessarily a good game, but a game according to the pitch and what the opponent proposed. We couldn't do much more with the conditions of the pitch." Martínez added on to Scaloni's comments by saying the pitch was, "Very bumpy. We must improve in this aspect; otherwise, Copa América will always appear at a lower level than the European Championship."

After Peruvian player Luis Advíncula's achilles injury during his side's match against Chile, Peru head coach Jorge Fossati cited AT&T Stadium's unsatisfactory field as a potential reason for his injury: "It came out of nowhere. I realize that this is a grass field today but it's not normal grass. It's not grass that's born, and grows [naturally]. It's a grass they bring in from elsewhere. That can be a bit of a harder surface and it can affect you in that exact place [the Achilles]." Vinícius Júnior, Kamal Miller, James Rodríguez, and Chile's coach Ricardo Gareca were among other notable figures who expressed their concerns about the field conditions.

"We started the project in June, when traveling to analyze fields and watch games here, and in November, we began inspections in all stadiums and all training centers," Maristela Kuhn, CONMEBOL's agricultural engineer, said. "Reports were generated with recommendations of everything that had to be done. We had meetings with the agronomists and programming. With a special technology, we had all the grass plantations defined."

=== High ticket prices ===
There were concerns about overpriced tickets, with many fans feeling that the costs were excessive compared to previous tournaments. This sparked discussions about accessibility and the overall affordability of attending matches. Ticket resale markets, both official and unofficial, were prevalent in the United States. Statistics on resale tickets revealed significant price increases; according to TickPick, the average purchase price for the 2024 Copa América group stage was $187, which marked a 61% rise from 2016, when it was $116. The most expensive group stage ticket was for the match between Argentina and Peru, with average purchase price for the match reached $478. For the final, tickets were priced anywhere from $1,300 to $7,000 through websites such as Ticketmaster and SeatGeek. As a result, several matches saw low attendance.

=== Referee management ===
The tournament was met with several poor refereeing incidents, the most notable of which included the United States vs Uruguay match; Uruguay's Mathías Olivera scored the only goal of the match in the 66th minute, but appeared to be offside when the ball was flicked on, yet a prolonged VAR review upheld the goal without summoning the match referee, Kevin Ortega, to the video monitor. Replays revealed a marginal overlap between Olivera's position and the foot of United States defender Chris Richards, potentially keeping the Uruguayan onside. There were other contentious non-decisions during the match, but the most peculiar incident, aside from the goal, occurred in the 32nd minute, when Ortega reached for a yellow card to book Richards. Uruguay quickly took the free kick, and just as Ortega was about to show the card, he raised his other arm signaling to play on. Nahitan Nández found himself through on goal but failed to score. Members of the United States team were very disappointed in the overall outcome of the match, particularly Christian Pulisic, who was seen showing his frustration to Ortega throughout the match, with Ortega refusing to shake Pulisic's hand after the final whistle, and head coach Gregg Berhalter stated in a post-game interview, "I don't understand it. You know, I feel like I know the rule pretty well. I feel like we had the pictures that are showing how the rule could be interpreted and it's an offside goal."

Another match that involved questionable referee decisions was the Brazil vs Colombia match, when Venezuelan referee Jesús Valenzuela denied a penalty in the 42nd minute for Vinícius Júnior, to which CONMEBOL, in a statement after the match, acknowledged that a critical VAR mistake was made.

=== Uruguay vs Colombia match altercation ===
In the aftermath of the semi-final match between Uruguay and Colombia, Uruguay forward Darwin Núñez was seen getting involved in a confrontation with fans of Colombia in the stadium stands. The altercation reportedly took place near where family members and friends of the Uruguay team were situated, with CONMEBOL later announcing it would investigate the incident.

The altercation was highly condemned. Two days after the match, Uruguay's head coach Marcelo Bielsa, in a press conference interview, stated, "You know whose responsibility it is to protect the fans in the stands. You have to ask me whether the players have received an apology from those responsible for safeguarding security. The players reacted as any human being would have done if they saw that there was no escape or prevention and they were attacking their wife, mother, or baby."

The Uruguayan players' involvement with the Colombian fans was supported by others, particularly from members of the Argentine national team. When interviewed about the situation, coach Lionel Scaloni commented, "The images were very upsetting, and I believe anyone in that situation would have acted the same way." Goalkeeper Emiliano Martínez likened the altercations to a similar incident at a 2026 FIFA World Cup qualification match between Argentina and Brazil in November 2023; "I had family members in the stands close to what took place, watching the young people and women being beaten with clubs (by the Brazilian police). It was terrible to witness that. I wouldn't claim that I would do the same thing (fight with the fans), but I am supporting with the Uruguayan players, I think we need to improve security a bit more. When you see women or your parents being hit, obviously with Darwin and (Mathias) Olivera, players that I know personally, it's a very sad thing to see." Colombian midfielder Juan Fernando Quintero also described the event as upsetting, "It's sad what happened and the people are not to blame. We don't want these kinds of things to happen when there's football. Nobody wants violence. Aggressive people who don't enjoy football shouldn't be in the stadiums."

=== Argentina vs Colombia ticketless fans ===
During the final between Argentina and Colombia, thousands of ticketless fans rushed the stadium gates amidst major crowd congestion, resulting in CONMEBOL delaying the start time three times, first from 8:00 p.m. to 8:30 p.m., then to 8:45 p.m., and finally to 9:22 p.m. The families of several Argentina players found themselves delayed at the gate. For example, the mother of Alexis Mac Allister stated in an interview that "He was worried and called us constantly to check on us, saying he would stay at the gate until we could get in." Many of the areas and equipment such as escalators were damaged. Some fans were seen trying to enter the stadium through the ventilation system, and some people suffered medical issues from the heat and crowd crush. Many ticketed fans were prevented from entering the stadium, leading to some seeking refunds.

=== CONMEBOL's sanctions and Shakira's halftime performance ===
Several coaches have been sanctioned and received a one-match ban by CONMEBOL after returning to the pitch later than the given fifteen minutes during their matches, including Lionel Scaloni during Argentina's match against Canada in the group stage, in which Canada's coach Jesse Marsch questioned, "I wish the referees would manage that. [Argentina] had that time to prepare how they wanted to play against us in the second half, which — if we would have known ahead of time that we could have an extra 10 minutes, then we could have prepared some things more", Uruguay's Marcelo Bielsa during their game with Bolivia, and Mexico's head coach Jaime Lozano during Mexico's match against Jamaica in Group B as the Jamaican players were waiting on the soccer field. Lozano later admitted he and his team were reviewing tactics, "I don't know if it's unfair. But we went through four or five plays, and I took too long. Yes, it's my responsibility. Normally we have some actions, some plays on the screen to correct, or to see what we are doing right. And there, I think I went a bit overboard."

Colombia's head coach Néstor Lorenzo criticized CONMEBOL's decision to extend the length of the halftime break in the final by 10 minutes to accommodate Shakira's halftime set. "When the rules change suddenly for both teams, when the pitch is bad for both sides or when the time to rest between halves is the same for both teams, I can't tell you if it's good or bad or who has an advantage. I don't understand it to be honest," he explained in a news conference. "I think the halftime for the final should be 15 minutes because those are the rules. And because we've been fined when we've walked back onto the pitch 16 minutes later. But now apparently, because there's going to be a concert, we'll be walking back out 20 to 25 minutes later. This could affect the players fitness. They could cool down too much. Those minutes of recovery in the dressing room, people don't understand what it takes to reach those levels."

=== Argentine celebrations ===
Following Argentina's victory in the final, a video live-streamed by Enzo Fernández on social media showed the Argentine players celebrating with alleged racist chants toward the French national team. The French Football Federation announced it would be lodging a complaint with FIFA. Fernández's club Chelsea announced it would investigate the video. Some of Fernández's Chelsea teammates unfollowed him on all of his social media accounts, with his teammate Wesley Fofana described it as "uninhibited racism". Fernández later apologized for the incident.

Argentina President Javier Milei congratulated the team for the victory. Many massive celebrations were held in Buenos Aires, Rosario, Córdoba and Mendoza.

== See also ==
- 2024 Copa América qualifying play-offs
- 2024 OFC Men's Nations Cup
- 2026 Finalissima
- UEFA Euro 2024
