= Jeremy Sarmiento =

Footballer (born 2002)

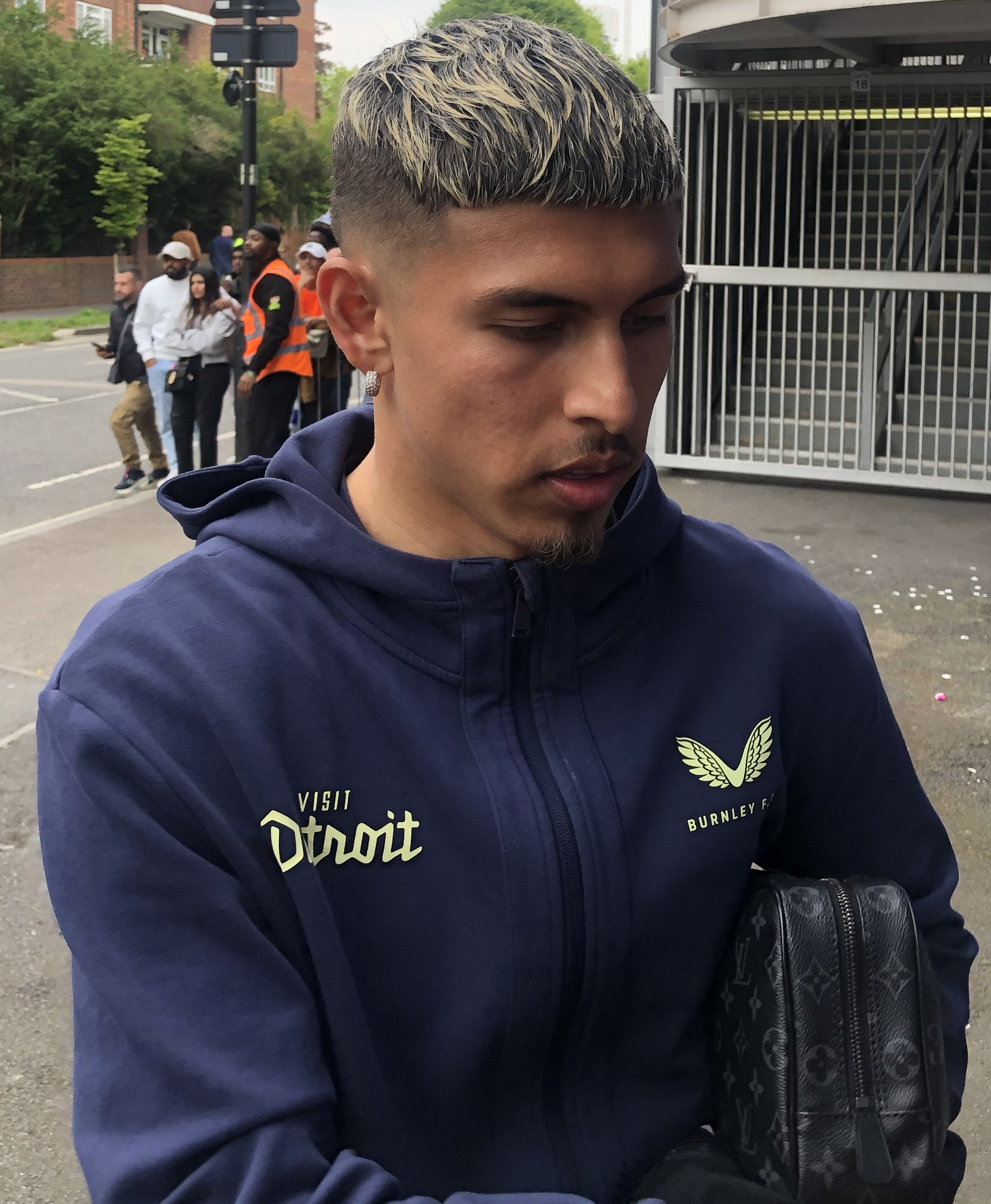
- Sarmiento in 2025

Personal information
- Full name: Jeremy Leonel Sarmiento Morante
- Date of birth: 16 June 2002 (age 24)
- Place of birth: Madrid, Spain
- Height: 1.78 m (5 ft 10 in)
- Position: Winger

Team information
- Current team: Middlesbrough
- Number: 16

Youth career
- 2009–2018: Charlton Athletic
- 2018–2021: Benfica
- 2021: Brighton & Hove Albion

Senior career*
Years	Team	Apps	(Gls)
2021–2026	Brighton & Hove Albion	15	(0)
2023	→ West Bromwich Albion (loan)	20	(2)
2024	→ Ipswich Town (loan)	20	(3)
2024–2025	→ Burnley (loan)	35	(4)
2025–2026	→ Cremonese (loan)	7	(0)
2026	→ Middlesbrough (loan)	17	(0)
2026–	Middlesbrough	5	(1)

International career^{‡}
2017–2018	England U16	5	(1)
2018–2019	England U17	5	(2)
2019	England U18	6	(1)
2021–	Ecuador	26	(2)
- * Club domestic league appearances and goals as of 17:06, 19 September 2026 (UTC) ‡ National team caps and goals as of 08:50, 5 October 2026 (UTC)

Jeremy Leonel Sarmiento Morante (born 16 June 2002) is a professional footballer who plays as a winger for EFL Championship club Middlesbrough and the Ecuador national team.

Born in Spain to Ecuadorian parents, he represented England at youth international level before making his senior Ecuador debut in October 2021.

== Club career ==
=== Brighton & Hove Albion ===
==== 2021–22: Breakthrough into senior team ====
A youth product of Charlton Athletic and Benfica, Sarmiento signed for the academy of Premier League side Brighton & Hove Albion on 2 July 2021. He made his professional career debut on 22 September, coming on as a 69th-minute substitute for injured Alexis Mac Allister in the 2–0 home victory over Swansea City in the third round of the EFL Cup. Sarmiento made a Premier League matchday squad for the first time on 2 October, remaining as an unused substitute in the 0–0 home draw against Arsenal. Sarmiento made his first senior start on 27 October, playing 69 minutes of the penalty shootout loss away at Leicester City in the EFL Cup. He made his Premier League debut on 27 November, coming on as an 82nd-minute substitute replacing Jakub Moder in the goalless draw at home against Leeds United. Sarmiento made his first Premier League start four days later, where he ultimately played just 13 minutes due to an injury in which he was replaced, in the eventual 1–1 away draw at West Ham United. It was revealed his injury, which was to the hamstring, would require an operation with Brighton boss Graham Potter hinting he would be back towards the end of February 2022. On 31 January 2022, he signed a new contract, committing a long-term future with Brighton signing on until June 2026. Sarmiento made his return to the matchday squad remaining as an unused substitute in the 2–0 home loss against Tottenham Hotspur on 16 March. He made his first appearance since his injury on 2 April, coming on as an 88th-minute substitute in the 0–0 home draw against bottom side Norwich City. Sarmiento replaced Moder who was subbed on five minutes previously but picked up an injury himself. At Albion's end of season awards in May, Sarmiento won the Young Player of the Season thanking everyone for his support adding, "My first season and making my Premier League debut were really special and I am honoured to win this award."

==== 2022–23 ====
Sarmiento made his first Premier League start of the season on 3 January 2023, where he helped set up Evan Ferguson's goal in the 4–1 away win over Everton. On 4 February, Sarmiento came on from the bench and later assisted Kaoru Mitoma's 87th-minute winner, the only goal of the game in the victory over AFC Bournemouth.

==== 2023–24: Loans to West Bromwich Albion and Ipswich Town ====
On 21 June 2023, Sarmiento agreed a new contract until June 2027, with the option of an extra year for the club. He joined Championship side West Bromwich Albion on a season-long loan on 25 July 2023. He made his debut on the opening weekend of the season, coming on as a substitute in the 71st minute for goal scorer Matt Phillips. However, Sarmiento nor West Brom could find the equaliser losing 2–1 away at Blackburn Rovers. Sarmiento scored his first professional goal of his career on 26 August, after coming off the bench he sealed all three points, scoring the last in the 4–2 home win over Middlesbrough. Sarmiento was recalled on 1 January 2024.

On 3 January 2024, Sarmiento joined fellow Championship side Ipswich Town on loan until the end of the season.

==== 2024–25: Loan to Burnley ====
On 30 August 2024, Sarmiento joined EFL Championship side Burnley on a one-year loan deal.

==== 2025–26: Loans to Cremonese and Middlesbrough ====
On 1 September 2025, Sarmiento joined Serie A side Cremonese on a one-year loan deal. However the loan deal was cut short and subsequently on 27 January 2026, Sarmiento joined EFL Championship side Middlesbrough on a 6-month loan deal, with an obligation to buy, subject to terms of the agreement been met.

=== Middlesbrough ===
On 28 May 2026 it was announced that Middlesbrough will permanently sign Sarmiento when the transfer window reopens, due to the obligation to buy clause in his loan contract.

== International career ==
=== Youth career ===
==== With England ====
Sarmiento was born in Spain to Ecuadorian parents, and moved to England at the age of 7. He is a youth international for England and represented them at the 2019 UEFA European Under-17 Championship. In October 2019 Sarmiento scored the winning goal for England under-18 in a 3–2 victory away to Austria.

=== Senior career ===
==== Pledge with Ecuador and 2022 FIFA World Cup ====
Sarmiento was called up for the Ecuador national team for the first time in October 2021 for 2022 World Cup qualifiers against Bolivia, Venezuela and Colombia. He debuted in a 3–0 win over Bolivia on 7 October 2021.

On 14 November, Sarmiento was named in Ecuador's 26-man squad for the 2022 FIFA World Cup alongside Brighton teammates Pervis Estupiñán and Moisés Caicedo.

Sarmiento was called up to the final 26-man Ecuador squad for the 2024 Copa América.

== Personal life ==
Sarmiento was born in Madrid, Spain, to Ecuadorian parents. He lived in Madrid until he was 7 years old when he moved to London, England with his family. As a young boy, Sarmiento was a fan of the Ecuador national team and had always wished to play for them.

== Career statistics ==
=== Club ===
As of match played 19 September 2026

Appearances and goals by club, season and competition
Club	Season	League			FA Cup		League Cup		Other		Total	
Club	Season	Division	Apps	Goals	Apps	Goals	Apps	Goals	Apps	Goals	Apps	Goals
Brighton & Hove Albion U21	2021–22	—			—		—		1 (Note: Appearance in EFL Trophy)	0	1	0
Brighton & Hove Albion	2021–22	Premier League	5	0	0	0	2	0	—		7	0
Brighton & Hove Albion	2022–23	Premier League	9	0	2	0	1	0	—		12	0
Brighton & Hove Albion	2024–25	Premier League	1	0	—		1	1	—		2	1
Brighton & Hove Albion	Total		15	0	2	0	4	1	—		21	1
West Bromwich Albion (loan)	2023–24	Championship	20	2	—		1	0	—		21	2
Ipswich Town (loan)	2023–24	Championship	20	3	2	1	—		—		22	4
Burnley (loan)	2024–25	Championship	35	4	2	0	—		—		37	4
Cremonese (loan)	2025–26	Serie A	7	0	—		—		—		7	0
Middlesbrough (loan)	2025–26	Championship	17	0	—		—		2 (Note: Appearances in EFL Championship play-offs)	0	19	0
Middlesbrough	2026–27	Championship	5	1	0	0	2	1	0	0	7	2
Career total			119	10	6	1	7	2	3	0	135	13

=== International ===
As of match played 5 October 2026

Appearances and goals by national team and year
National team	Year	Apps	Goals
Ecuador	2021	3	0
Ecuador	2022	9	0
Ecuador	2023	1	0
Ecuador	2024	11	2
Ecuador	2026	2	0
Total		26	2

Scores and results list Ecuador's goal tally first.

List of international goals scored by Jeremy Sarmiento
No.	Date	Venue	Opponent	Score	Result	Competition
1	16 June 2024	Pratt & Whitney Stadium, East Hartford, United States	Honduras	1–0	2–1	Friendly
2	22 June 2024	Levi's Stadium, Santa Clara, United States	Venezuela	1–0	1–2	2024 Copa América

== Honours ==
Ipswich Town

- EFL Championship runner-up: 2023–24

Individual

- Brighton & Hove Albion Young Player of the Season: 2021–22
