= Eduard Bello =

Venezuelan footballer (born 1995)

Personal information
- Full name: Eduard Alexander Bello Gil
- Date of birth: 20 August 1995 (age 31)
- Place of birth: Cúa, Venezuela
- Height: 1.77 m (5 ft 10 in)
- Position: Winger

Team information
- Current team: Deportivo Cali

Youth career
- 2009–2013: Yaracuyanos

Senior career*
| Years | Team | Apps | (Gls) |
| 2013–2014 | Yaracuyanos | 20 | (1) |
| 2014–2018 | Carabobo | 99 | (24) |
| 2018 | → Deportes Antofagasta (loan) | 8 | (2) |
| 2018–2021 | Deportes Antofagasta | 89 | (28) |
| 2022–2024 | Mazatlán | 60 | (8) |
| 2024–2025 | Barcelona SC | 15 | (2) |
| 2025 | → Universidad Católica (loan) | 26 | (6) |
| 2026– | Atlético Nacional | 18 | (2) |
| 2026– | → Deportivo Cali (loan) | 14 | (6) |

International career^{‡}
| 2018– | Venezuela | 24 | (4) |
- * Club domestic league appearances and goals as of 11 April 2026 ‡ National team caps and goals as of 9 September 2025

Eduard Alexander Bello Gil (born 20 August 1995) is a Venezuelan professional footballer who plays as a winger for Colombian club Deportivo Cali on loan from Atlético Nacional and the Venezuela national team.

== Club career ==
=== Yaracuyanos ===
Born in Cúa, Bello began playing football at the age of four, while also playing baseball. Aged 14, he chose the former sport and joined Yaracuyanos FC's youth setup.

Bello made his first team debut for Yaracuyanos on 22 September 2013, starting in a 2–0 Primera División away loss against Tucanes de Amazonas. He scored his first senior goal the following 19 January, netting his team's first in a 4–2 loss at Deportivo Táchira, and finished the campaign as a starter but suffering team relegation.

=== Carabobo ===
On 25 June 2014, Bello moved to fellow top-tier side Carabobo FC. After spending his first two campaigns as a backup option, he established himself as a regular in the first team.

Bello scored a brace ain a 3–2 home win against Zamora on 17 April 2016, and repeated the feat roughly one year later in a 5–1 away routing of Zulia. He ended the 2017 season with nine goals and eleven assists, being regarded as one of the best players in the tournament.

=== Deportes Antofagasta ===
On 12 January 2018, Bello moved abroad for the first time in his career, after agreeing to a one-year loan deal with Chilean Primera División side Deportes Antofagasta. He made his debut for the club on 3 February, starting in a 2–1 home loss against Colo-Colo.

Bello scored his first goal abroad on 9 February 2018, netting his team's third in a 3–1 away defeat of Unión La Calera. On 12 April, after two goals in eight matches, he was bought outright and signed a permanent four-year contract.

On 28 October 2018, after scoring a brace in a 3–2 loss at Everton de Viña del Mar and celebrating one of his goals by proposing to his fiancée, Bello suffered an injury which sidelined him for three months. He finished his first season abroad with 13 goals in 26 appearances, being the club's top scorer.

=== Barcelona SC ===
==== Universidad Católica (loan) ====
In January 2025, Bello joined Chilean club Universidad Católica on a one-year loan. He scored his third goal of the season against Unión Española in the first match of the men´s senior team in their new stadium, the Claro Arena

=== Atlético Nacional ===
Ended his contract with Barcelona SC, Bello moved to Colombia and joined Atlético Nacional on 17 January 2026.

== International career ==
On 15 August 2018, Bello was called up by Venezuela national team manager Rafael Dudamel for friendlies against Colombia and Panama. He made his full international debut on 11 September, coming on as a late substitute for Darwin Machís in a 2–0 win against the latter.

== Career statistics ==
=== Club ===
As of match played 6 December 2025

| Club | Season | League | | | National cup | | League cup | | Continental | | Other | | Total | |
| Club | Season | Division | Apps | Goals | Apps | Goals | Apps | Goals | Apps | Goals | Apps | Goals | Apps | Goals |
|---|---|---|---|---|---|---|---|---|---|---|---|---|---|---|
| Yaracuyanos | 2013–14 | Primera División | 20 | 1 | 4 | 0 | — | | — | | — | | 24 | 1 |
| Carabobo | 2014–15 | Primera División | 13 | 2 | 5 | 0 | — | | — | | — | | 18 | 2 |
| Carabobo | 2015 | Primera División | 12 | 2 | 5 | 3 | — | | — | | — | | 17 | 5 |
| Carabobo | 2016 | Primera División | 34 | 11 | 2 | 0 | — | | — | | — | | 36 | 11 |
| Carabobo | 2017 | Primera División | 40 | 9 | 6 | 4 | — | | 2 (Note: Appearance(s) in Copa Libertadores) | 0 | — | | 46 | 10 |
| Carabobo | Subtotal | | 99 | 24 | 18 | 4 | — | | 2 | 0 | — | | 119 | 28 |
| Deportes Antofagasta | 2018 | Primera División | 26 | 13 | 1 | 0 | — | | — | | — | | 27 | 13 |
| Deportes Antofagasta | 2019 | Primera División | 21 | 2 | 2 | 2 | — | | 2 | 0 | — | | 25 | 4 |
| Deportes Antofagasta | 2020 | Primera División | 30 | 10 | 0 | 0 | — | | — | | — | | 30 | 10 |
| Deportes Antofagasta | 2021 | Primera División | 24 | 6 | 2 | 0 | — | | 2 (Note: Appearance(s) in Copa Sudamericana) | 0 | — | | 28 | 6 |
| Deportes Antofagasta | Total | | 101 | 31 | 5 | 2 | — | | 4 | 0 | — | | 110 | 32 |
| Mazatlán | 2021–22 | Liga MX | 11 | 1 | 0 | 0 | — | | — | | — | | 11 | 1 |
| Mazatlán | 2022–23 | Liga MX | 24 | 4 | 0 | 0 | — | | — | | — | | 24 | 4 |
| Mazatlán | 2023–24 | Liga MX | 25 | 3 | 0 | 0 | — | | — | | 3 (Note: Appearances in Leagues Cup) | 1 | 28 | 4 |
| Mazatlán | Total | | 60 | 8 | 0 | 0 | — | | — | | 3 | 1 | 63 | 9 |
| Barcelona | 2024 | Ecuadorian Serie A | 15 | 2 | — | | — | | — | | — | | 15 | 2 |
| Universidad Catolica (loan) | 2025 | Primera División | 26 | 6 | 4 | 1 | — | | 1 | 0 | — | | 31 | 7 |
| Career total | | | 321 | 72 | 31 | 7 | — | | 7 | 0 | 3 | 1 | 336 | 72 |

=== International ===
As of 9 September 2025

Venezuela
| Year | Apps | Goals |
|---|---|---|
| 2018 | 2 | 0 |
| 2021 | 6 | 1 |
| 2022 | 2 | 0 |
| 2023 | 4 | 1 |
| 2024 | 7 | 2 |
| 2025 | 3 | 0 |
| Total | 24 | 4 |

=== International goals ===
Scores and results list Venezuela's goal tally first, score column indicates score after each Bello goal.

List of international goals scored by Eduard Bello
| No. | Date | Venue | Opponent | Score | Result | Competition |
|---|---|---|---|---|---|---|
| 1 | 10 October 2021 | Estadio Olímpico UCV, Caracas, Venezuela | Ecuador | 2–1 | 2–1 | 2022 FIFA World Cup qualification |
| 2 | 12 October 2023 | Arena Pantanal, Cuiabá, Brazil | Brazil | 1–1 | 1–1 | 2026 FIFA World Cup qualification |
| 3 | 22 June 2024 | Levi's Stadium, Santa Clara, United States | Ecuador | 2–1 | 2–1 | 2024 Copa América |
| 4 | 30 June 2024 | Q2 Stadium, Austin, United States | Jamaica | 1–0 | 3–0 | 2024 Copa América |
