= Canada men's national soccer team records and statistics =

Canada's men's national soccer team and its players hold the following competitive records.

== Honours ==
=== Senior team ===
==== Major competitions ====
- CONCACAF Championship / Gold Cup:
  - Winners (2): 1985, 2000
  - Third place: 2002
  - Semi-finals (2): 2007, 2021
- CONCACAF Nations League:
  - Runners-up: 2022–23
  - Third place: 2024–25

==== North American competitions ====
- North American Nations Cup:
  - Winners: 1990
- Canadian Shield:
  - Winners: 2025

=== Olympic Games ===
- Summer Olympics:
  - (gold) Gold medallists: 1904
- CONCACAF Olympic Qualifying Tournament:
  - Runners-up: 1984

== Individual records ==
As of November 16, 2026
Players in bold are still active with Canada.

=== Most capped players ===
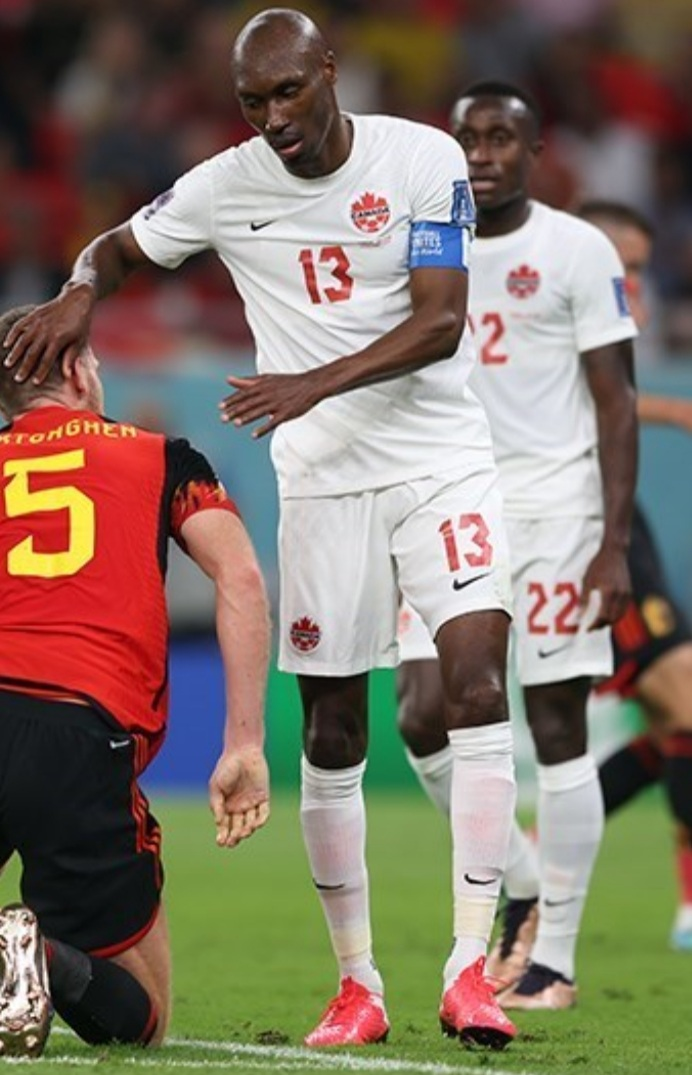
Atiba Hutchinson is Canada's most capped player with 104 appearances.

Rank	Player	Caps	Goals	Career
1	Atiba Hutchinson	104	9	2003–2023
2	**Cyle Larin**	95	32	2014–present
3	**Jonathan Osorio**	92	10	2013–present
4	Julián de Guzmán	89	4	2002–2016
5	**Jonathan David**	87	45	2018–present
6	**Richie Laryea**	85	1	2019–present
7	Paul Stalteri	84	7	1997–2010
8	Randy Samuel	82	0	1983–1997
9	Dwayne De Rosario	81	22	1998–2015
10	Milan Borjan	80	0	2011–2023

=== Top goalscorers ===
Jonathan David is Canada's all-time top scorer with 45 goals.

Rank	Player	Goals	Caps	Ratio	Career
1	**Jonathan David** (list)	45	87	0.52	2018–present
2	**Cyle Larin** (list)	32	95	0.34	2014–present
3	Dwayne De Rosario (list)	22	81	0.27	1998–2015
4	Lucas Cavallini	19	40	0.48	2012–2023
4	John Catliff	19	43	0.44	1984–1994
4	Dale Mitchell	19	55	0.35	1980–1993
7	Tosaint Ricketts	17	61	0.28	2011–2020
7	**Junior Hoilett**	17	70	0.24	2015–present
9	Alex Bunbury	16	66	0.25	1986–1997
10	Ali Gerba	15	30	0.5	2005–2011
10	**Alphonso Davies**	15	60	0.25	2017–present

=== World Cup goalscorers ===
Rank	Player	Goals	World Cup games	Ratio	World Cups	Career
1	Jonathan David	3	8	0.38	2022, 2026	2019–present
2	Cyle Larin	2	7	0.29	2022, 2026	2017–present
3	Nathan Saliba	1	3	0.33	2026	2024–present
3	Promise David	1	4	0.25	2026	2025–present
3	Alphonso Davies	1	4	0.25	2022, 2026	2018–present
3	Stephen Eustáquio	1	7	0.14	2022, 2026	2019–present

Most appearances
104 – Atiba Hutchinson
Longest international career
22 years – Pat Onstad from 1988 to 2010
Most goals
45 – Jonathan David
Most goals in one game
3 – John Catliff vs Jamaica in 1988, Alex Bunbury vs Bermuda in 1992, Simeon Jackson vs Saint Lucia in 2011, Lucas Cavallini vs Cuba in 2019, Jonathan David vs Cuba in 2019, Junior Hoilett vs Cuba in 2019, Cyle Larin vs Bermuda in 2021, Lucas Cavallini vs Cayman Islands in 2021, Jonathan David vs Suriname in 2021, and Jonathan David vs Qatar in 2026
Most goals in one year
14 – Cyle Larin in 2021
Most consecutive games with at least one goal
4 – Dale Mitchell, Ali Gerba, Cyle Larin
Most consecutive games with at least two goals
2 – Tom Kouzmanis vs Jamaica and Trinidad and Tobago in 1995, Ali Gerba vs Saint Vincent and the Grenadines (twice) in 2008, and Lucas Cavallini vs Cayman Islands and Aruba in 2021
Most braces (2 goals in one game)
5 – Dale Mitchell vs New Zealand in 1980, Trinidad and Tobago in 1981, Guatemala in 1985 and 1988, and Honduras in 1991
Most penalty kicks scored
7 – Dwayne De Rosario
Least amount of time in between two consecutive goals
1 minute – Tom Kouzmanis vs Jamaica in 1995
Longest amount of time between first and last goals
17 years, 3 months, and 24 days – Atiba Hutchinson vs Honduras in 2004 and El Salvador in 2022
Most appearances before scoring a first international goal
49 – Nik Ledgerwood vs El Salvador in 2016
Fastest goal from kickoff
2nd minute – Bob Lenarduzzi vs New Zealand in 1980, Alphonso Davies vs Croatia in 2022
Latest goal in regulation time
90+5th minute – Sam Adekugbe vs United States in 2022, Lucas Cavallini vs Japan in 2022
Latest goal in extra time
120th minute – John Catliff vs Mexico in 1990
Most goals in a debut
2 – Art Hughes, Dale Mitchell, Nick Papadakis, Tom Kouzmanis, Jonathan David

== Team records ==
First game
2–3 loss to Australia June 7, 1924
First win
1–0 win against Australia June 14, 1924
Biggest win
11–0 vs Cayman Islands on March 29, 2021
Biggest loss
0–8 vs Mexico June 18, 1993
Most goals scored in one game
11 vs Cayman Islands on March 29, 2021
Longest winning streak
8 games – from March 25, 2021, vs Bermuda to July 15, 2021, vs Haiti
Longest undefeated streak
15 games – from September 2, 1999, vs Jamaica to June 4, 2000, vs Cuba
Longest losing streak
8 games – from October 31, 1974, vs Poland to August 10, 1975, vs Hungary
Longest winless streak
16 games – from October 16, 2012, vs Honduras to May 27, 2014, vs Moldova
Longest goalless streak
959 minutes – from March 22, 2013, vs Japan to May 23, 2014, vs Bulgaria
Longest clean sheet streak
567 minutes – from January 19, 2015, vs Iceland to July 11, 2015, vs Jamaica

== Competitive record ==
=== FIFA World Cup ===
FIFA World Cup record
Year	Round	Pld	W	D*	L	GF	GA
(Uruguay) 1930	Did not enter						
(Italy) 1934	Did not enter						
(France) 1938	Did not enter						
(Brazil) 1950	Did not enter						
(Switzerland) 1954	Did not enter						
(Sweden) 1958	Did not qualify						
(Chile) 1962	Did not enter						
(England) 1966	Did not enter						
(Mexico) 1970	Did not qualify						
(West Germany) 1974	Did not qualify						
(Argentina) 1978	Did not qualify						
(Spain) 1982	Did not qualify						
(Mexico) 1986	Group stage	3	0	0	3	0	5
(Italy) 1990	Did not qualify						
(United States) 1994	Did not qualify						
(France) 1998	Did not qualify						
(South Korea) (Japan) 2002	Did not qualify						
(Germany) 2006	Did not qualify						
(South Africa) 2010	Did not qualify						
(Brazil) 2014	Did not qualify						
(Russia) 2018	Did not qualify						
(Qatar) 2022	Group stage	3	0	0	3	2	7
(Canada) (Mexico) (United States) 2026	Round of 16	5	2	1	2	9	6
Total	3/23	11	2	1	8	11	18

FIFA World Cup history
First match	Canada 0–1 France (June 1, 1986; León, Mexico)
Biggest win	Canada 6–0 Qatar (June 18, 2026; Vancouver, Canada)
Biggest defeat	Croatia 4–1 Canada (November 27, 2022; Al Rayyan, Qatar); Canada 0–3 Morocco (July 4, 2026; Houston, United States)
Best result	Round of 16 in 2026
Worst result	Group stage in 1986, 2022

=== CONCACAF Championship / Gold Cup ===
CONCACAF Championship / Gold Cup record
Total: 2 titles
Year	Round	Pld	W	D*	L	GF	GA
(El Salvador) 1963	Did not enter						
(Guatemala) 1965	Did not enter						
(Honduras) 1967	Did not enter						
(Costa Rica) 1969	Did not enter						
(Trinidad and Tobago) 1971	Did not enter						
(Haiti) 1973	Did not qualify						
(Mexico) 1977	Fourth place	5	2	1	2	7	8
(Honduras) 1981	Fourth place	5	1	3	1	6	6
1985	Champions	8	5	3	0	11	4
1989	Did not qualify						
(United States) 1991	Group stage	3	1	0	2	6	9
(Mexico) (United States) 1993	Group stage	3	0	2	1	3	11
(United States) 1996	Group stage	2	1	0	1	4	5
(United States) 1998	Withdrew						
(United States) 2000	Champions	5	3	2	0	7	3
(United States) 2002	Third place	5	2	2	1	5	4
(Mexico) (United States) 2003	Group stage	2	1	0	1	1	2
(United States) 2005	Group stage	3	1	0	2	2	4
(United States) 2007	Semi-finals	5	3	0	2	9	5
(United States) 2009	Quarter-finals	4	2	1	1	4	3
(United States) 2011	Group stage	3	1	1	1	2	3
(United States) 2013	Group stage	3	0	1	2	0	3
(Canada) (United States) 2015	Group stage	3	0	2	1	0	1
(United States) 2017	Quarter-finals	4	1	2	1	6	5
(Costa Rica) (Jamaica) (United States) 2019	Quarter-finals	4	2	0	2	14	6
(United States) 2021	Semi-finals	5	3	0	2	11	5
(Canada) (United States) 2023	Quarter-finals	4	1	3	0	8	6
(Canada) (United States) 2025	Quarter-finals	4	2	2	0	10	2
2027	Qualified						
Total (21/29)	2 titles	80	32	25	23	116	95

CONCACAF Championship / Gold Cup history
First match	Canada 1–2 El Salvador (October 8, 1977; Monterrey, Mexico)
Biggest win	Canada 7–0 Cuba (June 23, 2019; Charlotte, United States)
Biggest defeat	Mexico 8–0 Canada (July 18, 1993; Mexico City, Mexico)
Best result	Champions in 1985, 2000
Worst result	Group stage in 1991, 1993, 1996, 2003, 2005, 2011, 2013, 2015

=== CONCACAF Nations League ===
CONCACAF Nations League record
League phase / Quarter-finals										Finals								
Season	Division	Group	Pld	W	D	L	GF	GA	P/R	Year	Result	Pld	W	D	L	GF	GA	Squad
2019–20	A	A	4	3	0	1	10	4	Same position	(United States) 2021	Did not qualify							
2022–23	A	C	4	3	0	1	11	3	Same position	(United States) 2023	Runners-up	2	1	0	1	2	2	Squad
2023–24	A	Bye	2	1	0	1	4	4	Same position	(United States) 2024	Did not qualify							
2024–25	A	Bye	2	2	0	0	4	0	Same position	(United States) 2025	Third place	2	1	0	1	2	3	Squad
2026–27	A	Bye	2	2	0	0	7	3	Same position	(United States) 2027	Qualified							
Total	—		14	11	0	3	36	14	—	Total	0 titles	4	2	0	2	4	5	—

CONCACAF Nations League history
First match	Canada 6–0 Cuba (September 7, 2019; Toronto, Canada)
Biggest win	Canada 6–0 Cuba (September 7, 2019; Toronto, Canada)
Biggest defeat	United States 4–1 Canada (November 15, 2019; Orlando, United States)
Best result	Runners-up in 2022–23
Worst result	5th place in 2019–20, 2023–24

=== Copa América ===
Copa América record
Year	Round	Pld	W	D*	L	GF	GA
(Argentina) 1916 to (Paraguay) 1999	Not invited						
(Colombia) 2001	Originally invited but withdrew						
(Peru) 2004 to (Chile) 2015	Not invited						
(United States) 2016	Did not qualify						
(Brazil) 2019 to (Brazil) 2021	Not invited						
(United States) 2024	Fourth place	6	1	3	2	4	7
Total	1/48	6	1	3	2	4	7

Copa América history
First match	Argentina 2–0 Canada (June 20, 2024; Atlanta, United States)
Biggest win	Peru 0–1 Canada (June 25, 2024; Kansas City, United States)
Biggest defeat	Argentina 2–0 Canada (June 20, 2024; Atlanta, United States); Argentina 2–0 Canada (July 9, 2024; East Rutherford, United States)
Best result	Fourth place in 2024
Worst result	Fourth place in 2024

*Denotes draws include knockout matches decided via penalty shoot-out.
**Silver background colour indicates that the tournament was held on home soil. Gold background colour indicates that the tournament was won.

=== FIFA Confederations Cup ===
FIFA Confederations Cup record
Year	Round	Pld	W	D*	L	GF	GA
(Saudi Arabia) 1992 to (Mexico) 1999	Did not qualify						
(South Korea) (Japan) 2001	Group stage	3	0	1	2	0	5
(France) 2003 to (Russia) 2017	Did not qualify						
Total	1/10	3	0	1	2	0	5

FIFA Confederations Cup history
First match	Japan 3–0 Canada (May 31, 2001; Niigata, Japan)
Biggest win	—
Biggest defeat	Japan 3–0 Canada (May 31, 2001; Niigata, Japan)
Best result	Group stage in 2001
Worst result	Group stage in 2001

*Denotes draws include knockout matches decided via penalty shoot-out.
**Silver background colour indicates that the tournament was held on home soil. Gold background colour indicates that the tournament was won.

=== Pan American Games ===
- 1951 – did not enter
- 1955 – did not enter
- 1959 – did not enter
- 1963 – did not enter
- 1967 – fourth place
- 1971 – fifth place
- 1975 – round 2
- 1979 – did not enter
- 1983 – did not enter
- 1987 – round 1
- 1991 – round 1
- 1995 – did not enter
- 1999 – fourth place
- 2003 – did not enter
- 2007 – did not enter

=== NAFC Championship ===
- 1947 – did not enter
- 1949 – did not enter
- 1990 – champions
- 1991 – third place

=== Olympic Games ===
Year	Result	Pld	W	D*	L	GF	GA
(France) 1900	Did not qualify						
(United States) 1904	Gold medallists	2	2	0	0	11	0
(United Kingdom) 1908 to (Japan) 1964	Did not enter						
(Mexico) 1968 to (West Germany) 1972	Did not qualify						
(Canada) 1976	Group stage	2	0	0	2	2	5
(Soviet Union) 1980	Did not qualify						
(United States) 1984	Quarter-finals	4	1	2	1	5	4
(South Korea) 1988 to (United States) 2028	Did not qualify						
Total	3/29	8	3	2	3	18	9

*Denotes draws including knockout matches decided via penalty shoot-out.
**Gold background colour indicates that the tournament was won. Red border colour indicates tournament was held on home soil.

Olympic medal record

Men's Soccer
Gold medal – first place	1904 St. Louis	Team

== Head-to-head record ==
Key

Positive balance (more wins than losses)
Neutral balance (as many wins as losses)
Negative balance (more losses than wins)

The following table shows Canada's all-time official international record per opponent:

As of November 16, 2026

Opponent	Pld	W	D	L	GF	GA	GD	W%	Confederation
Algeria	1	0	0	1	0	1	−1	0.00	CAF
Argentina	3	0	0	3	0	9	−9	0.00	CONMEBOL
Aruba	1	1	0	0	7	0	+7	100.00	CONCACAF
Armenia	1	0	0	1	1	3	−2	0.00	UEFA
Australia	10	3	1	6	11	16	−5	30.00	AFC
Austria	1	1	0	0	2	0	+2	100.00	UEFA
Azerbaijan	1	0	1	0	1	1	0	0.00	UEFA
Bahrain	1	0	1	0	2	2	0	0.00	AFC
Barbados	3	3	0	0	9	2	+7	100.00	CONCACAF
Belarus	2	1	0	1	1	2	−1	50.00	UEFA
Belgium	2	0	0	2	0	3	−3	0.00	UEFA
Belize	4	3	1	0	12	1	+11	75.00	CONCACAF
Bermuda	11	6	4	1	22	8	+14	54.54	CONCACAF
Bosnia and Herzegovina	1	0	1	0	1	1	0	0.00	UEFA
Brazil	4	0	2	2	4	8	−4	0.00	CONMEBOL
Bulgaria	1	0	1	0	1	1	0	0.00	UEFA
Cayman Islands	1	1	0	0	11	0	+11	100.00	CONCACAF
Cameroon	1	0	0	1	0	2	−2	0.00	CAF
Chile	6	2	2	2	3	4	−1	33.33	CONMEBOL
China	2	1	0	1	5	3	+2	50.00	AFC
Colombia	5	1	1	3	2	5	−3	20.00	CONMEBOL
Costa Rica	24	6	9	9	18	22	−4	25.00	CONCACAF
Croatia	1	0	0	1	1	4	−3	0.00	UEFA
Cuba	15	10	3	2	31	11	+20	66.67	CONCACAF
Curaçao	4	3	1	0	9	2	+7	75.00	CONCACAF
Cyprus	2	1	1	0	1	0	+1	50.00	UEFA
Czech Republic	2	0	0	2	1	7	−6	0.00	UEFA
Denmark	3	0	0	3	0	7	−7	0.00	UEFA
Dominica	3	3	0	0	11	0	+11	100.00	CONCACAF
East Germany	1	0	0	1	0	2	−2	0.00	UEFA
Ecuador	4	0	2	2	3	6	−3	0.00	CONMEBOL
Egypt	2	0	0	2	0	4	−4	0.00	CAF
El Salvador	21	11	4	6	27	18	+9	52.38	CONCACAF
England	1	0	0	1	0	1	−1	0.00	UEFA
Estonia	2	0	0	2	1	4	−3	0.00	UEFA
Faroe Islands	2	1	0	1	1	1	0	50.00	UEFA
Finland	1	0	0	1	2	3	−1	0.00	UEFA
France	2	0	1	1	0	1	−1	0.00	UEFA
French Guiana	2	2	0	0	8	3	+5	100.00	CONCACAF
Germany	2	0	0	2	1	6	−5	0.00	UEFA
Ghana	2	1	1	0	3	2	+1	50.00	CAF
Greece	4	0	1	3	0	5	−5	0.00	UEFA
Guadeloupe	3	1	1	1	4	4	0	33.33	CONCACAF
Guatemala	17	12	3	2	28	12	+16	70.59	CONCACAF
Haiti	14	10	2	2	25	12	+13	71.43	CONCACAF
Honduras	30	10	8	12	42	44	−2	33.33	CONCACAF
Hong Kong	1	1	0	0	3	1	+2	100.00	AFC
Hungary	2	0	0	2	0	3	−3	0.00	UEFA
Iceland	5	0	3	2	5	7	−2	0.00	UEFA
Indonesia	1	1	0	0	4	0	+4	100.00	AFC
Iran	3	1	0	2	1	2	−1	33.33	AFC
Iraq	1	0	0	1	1	6	−5	0.00	AFC
Italy	1	0	0	1	0	2	−2	0.00	UEFA
Ivory Coast	1	0	1	0	0	0	0	0.00	CAF
Jamaica	26	11	7	8	33	23	+10	42.31	CONCACAF
Japan	4	1	0	3	4	10	−6	25.00	AFC
Libya	1	1	0	0	4	2	+2	100.00	CAF
Luxembourg	1	1	0	0	1	0	+1	100.00	UEFA
Malaysia	1	1	0	0	5	0	+5	100.00	AFC
Malta	1	0	0	1	1	2	−1	0.00	UEFA
Martinique	6	3	2	1	12	5	+7	50.00	CONCACAF
Mauritania	3	1	1	1	4	1	+3	33.33	CAF
Mexico	40	4	11	25	26	89	−63	10.00	CONCACAF
Morocco	5	0	1	4	4	13	−9	0.00	CAF
Moldova	1	0	1	0	1	1	0	0.00	UEFA
Netherlands	2	0	0	2	0	7	−7	0.00	UEFA
New Zealand	7	5	1	1	16	5	+11	71.43	OFC
Northern Ireland	3	2	1	0	4	1	+3	66.67	UEFA
North Korea	2	0	1	1	0	2	−2	0.00	AFC
North Macedonia	2	1	0	1	1	3	−2	50.00	UEFA
Panama	14	6	6	2	16	9	+7	42.86	CONCACAF
Paraguay	1	0	1	0	0	0	0	0.00	CONMEBOL
Peru	3	2	0	1	6	3	+3	66.67	CONMEBOL
Poland	4	0	0	4	2	8	−6	0.00	UEFA
Portugal	2	0	1	1	2	5	−3	0.00	UEFA
Puerto Rico	3	2	1	0	6	0	+6	66.67	CONCACAF
Qatar	2	2	0	0	8	0	+8	100.00	AFC
Republic of Ireland	2	0	1	1	1	4	−3	0.00	UEFA
Romania	1	1	0	0	3	0	+3	100.00	UEFA
Saint Kitts and Nevis	3	2	1	0	5	0	+5	66.67	CONCACAF
Saint Lucia	2	2	0	0	11	1	+10	100.00	CONCACAF
Saint Vincent and the Grenadines	2	2	0	0	7	1	+6	100.00	CONCACAF
Saudi Arabia	1	0	0	1	0	2	−2	0.00	AFC
Scotland	6	0	1	5	3	14	−11	0.00	UEFA
Singapore	2	2	0	0	2	0	+2	100.00	AFC
Slovenia	1	0	0	1	0	1	−1	0.00	UEFA
South Africa	2	1	0	1	1	2	−1	50.00	CAF
South Korea	5	2	1	2	4	5	−1	40.00	AFC
Spain	2	0	0	2	1	4	−3	0.00	UEFA
Soviet Union	1	0	0	1	0	2	−2	0.00	UEFA
Suriname	4	4	0	0	10	1	+9	100.00	CONCACAF
Switzerland	2	1	0	1	4	3	+1	50.00	UEFA
Trinidad and Tobago	12	8	2	2	18	12	+6	66.67	CONCACAF
Tunisia	2	0	1	1	0	2	−2	0.00	CAF
Turkey	2	0	0	2	1	6	−5	0.00	UEFA
Ukraine	2	1	1	0	6	4	+2	50.00	UEFA
United States	43	12	13	18	45	65	−20	27.90	CONCACAF
Uruguay	3	0	1	2	3	7	−4	0.00	CONMEBOL
U.S. Virgin Islands	1	1	0	0	8	0	+8	100.00	CONCACAF
Uzbekistan	2	2	0	0	4	1	+3	100.00	AFC
Venezuela	4	2	2	0	6	4	+2	50.00	CONMEBOL
Wales	4	2	0	2	3	4	−1	50.00	UEFA
Total	487	185	116	186	628	608	+20	37.99	

== See also ==
- Canada men's national soccer team
- List of Canada international soccer players
