= List of international goals scored by Jonathan David =

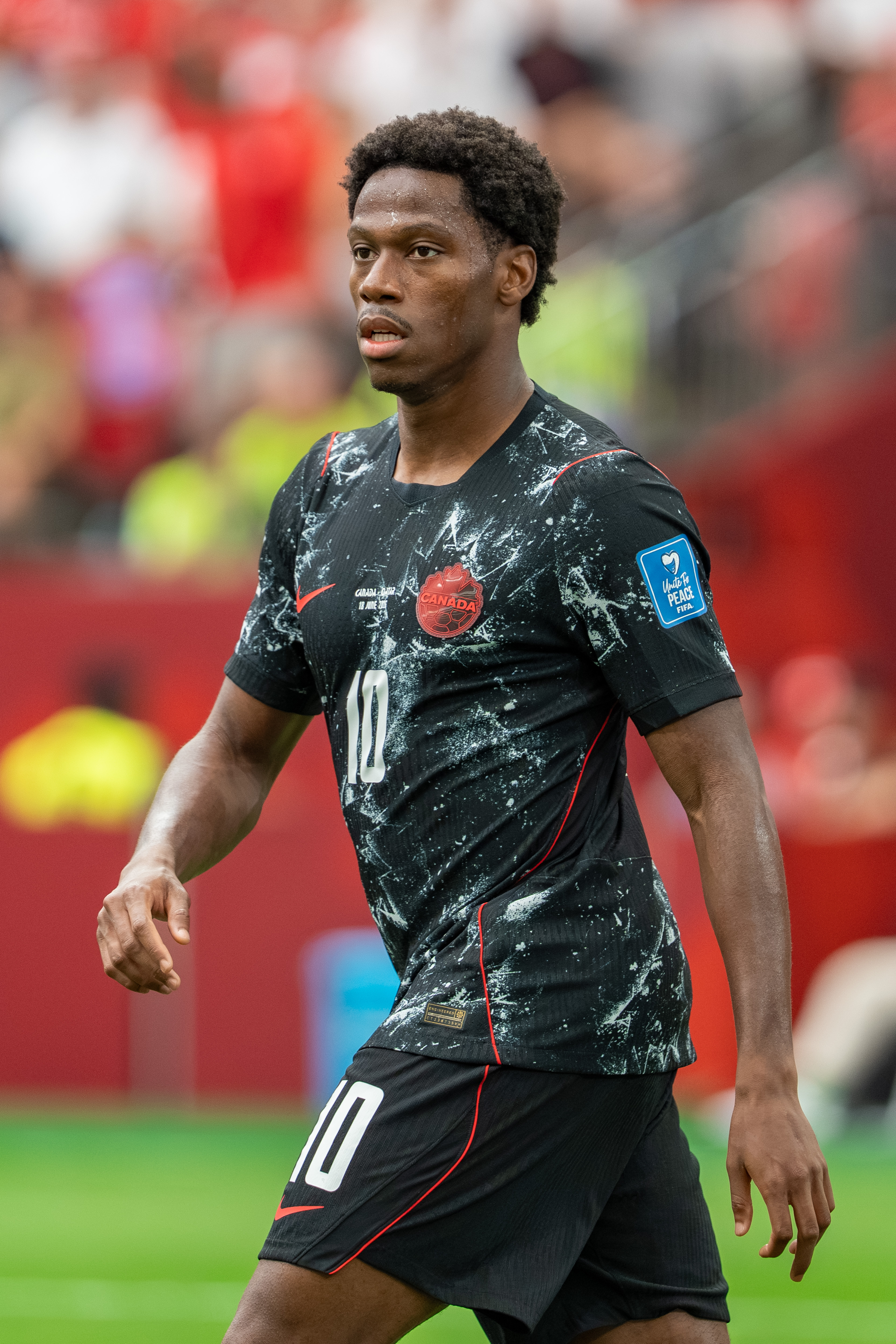
David with Canada at the 2026 FIFA World Cup

Jonathan David is a professional soccer player who represents the Canada national soccer team. As of November 16, 2026, he has scored 45 goals in 87 international appearances, making him the country's all-time men's top goalscorer.

David scored twice on his senior debut in an 8–0 win over the U.S. Virgin Islands on September 9, 2018.

Upon scoring his 31st goal against Suriname on November 17, 2024, David surpassed Cyle Larin as Canada's record scorer.

== International goals ==
As of match played November 16, 2026

Scores and results list Canada's goal tally first, score column indicates score after each David goal.

List of international goals scored by Jonathan David
| No. | Cap | Date | Venue | Opponent | Score | Result | Competition | Ref. |
|---|---|---|---|---|---|---|---|---|
| 1 | 1 | September 9, 2018 | IMG Academy Stadium, Bradenton, United States | U.S. Virgin Islands | 3–0 | 8–0 | 2019–20 CONCACAF Nations League qualifying | |
| 2 | 1 | September 9, 2018 | IMG Academy Stadium, Bradenton, United States | U.S. Virgin Islands | 4–0 | 8–0 | 2019–20 CONCACAF Nations League qualifying | |
| 3 | 2 | October 16, 2018 | BMO Field, Toronto, Canada | Dominica | 1–0 | 5–0 | 2019–20 CONCACAF Nations League qualifying | |
| 4 | 4 | March 24, 2019 | BC Place, Vancouver, Canada | French Guiana | 3–1 | 4–1 | 2019–20 CONCACAF Nations League qualifying | |
| 5 | 5 | June 15, 2019 | Broncos Stadium, Denver, United States | Martinique | 1–0 | 4–0 | 2019 CONCACAF Gold Cup | |
| 6 | 5 | June 15, 2019 | Broncos Stadium, Denver, United States | Martinique | 2–0 | 4–0 | 2019 CONCACAF Gold Cup | |
| 7 | 7 | June 23, 2019 | Bank of America Stadium, Charlotte, United States | Cuba | 1–0 | 7–0 | 2019 CONCACAF Gold Cup | |
| 8 | 7 | June 23, 2019 | Bank of America Stadium, Charlotte, United States | Cuba | 6–0 | 7–0 | 2019 CONCACAF Gold Cup | |
| 9 | 7 | June 23, 2019 | Bank of America Stadium, Charlotte, United States | Cuba | 7–0 | 7–0 | 2019 CONCACAF Gold Cup | |
| 10 | 8 | June 29, 2019 | NRG Stadium, Houston, United States | Haiti | 1–0 | 2–3 | 2019 CONCACAF Gold Cup | |
| 11 | 9 | September 7, 2019 | BMO Field, Toronto, Canada | Cuba | 2–0 | 6–0 | 2019–20 CONCACAF Nations League A | |
| 12 | 13 | June 5, 2021 | IMG Academy Stadium, Bradenton, United States | Aruba | 7–0 | 7–0 | 2022 FIFA World Cup qualification | |
| 13 | 14 | June 8, 2021 | SeatGeek Stadium, Bridgeview, United States | Suriname | 2–0 | 4–0 | 2022 FIFA World Cup qualification | |
| 14 | 14 | June 8, 2021 | SeatGeek Stadium, Bridgeview, United States | Suriname | 3–0 | 4–0 | 2022 FIFA World Cup qualification | |
| 15 | 14 | June 8, 2021 | SeatGeek Stadium, Bridgeview, United States | Suriname | 4–0 | 4–0 | 2022 FIFA World Cup qualification | |
| 16 | 19 | September 8, 2021 | BMO Field, Toronto, Canada | El Salvador | 2–0 | 3–0 | 2022 FIFA World Cup qualification | |
| 17 | 22 | October 13, 2021 | BMO Field, Toronto, Canada | Panama | 4–1 | 4–1 | 2022 FIFA World Cup qualification | |
| 18 | 23 | November 12, 2021 | Commonwealth Stadium, Edmonton, Canada | Costa Rica | 1–0 | 1–0 | 2022 FIFA World Cup qualification | |
| 19 | 25 | January 27, 2022 | Estadio Olímpico Metropolitano, San Pedro Sula, Honduras | Honduras | 2–0 | 2–0 | 2022 FIFA World Cup qualification | |
| 20 | 27 | February 2, 2022 | Estadio Cuscatlán, San Salvador, El Salvador | El Salvador | 2–0 | 2–0 | 2022 FIFA World Cup qualification | |
| 21 | 32 | June 14, 2022 | Estadio Olímpico Metropolitano, San Pedro Sula, Honduras | Honduras | 1–2 | 1–2 | 2022–23 CONCACAF Nations League A | |
| 22 | 33 | September 23, 2022 | Viola Park, Vienna, Austria | Qatar | 2–0 | 2–0 | Friendly | |
| 23 | 39 | March 25, 2023 | Ergilio Hato Stadium, Willemstad, Curaçao | Curaçao | 1–0 | 2–0 | 2022–23 CONCACAF Nations League A | |
| 24 | 40 | March 28, 2023 | BMO Field, Toronto, Canada | Honduras | 3–0 | 4–1 | 2022–23 CONCACAF Nations League A | |
| 25 | 41 | June 15, 2023 | Allegiant Stadium, Paradise, United States | Panama | 1–0 | 2–0 | 2023 CONCACAF Nations League Finals | |
| 26 | 44 | November 18, 2023 | Independence Park, Kingston, Jamaica | Jamaica | 1–0 | 2–1 | 2023–24 CONCACAF Nations League A | |
| 27 | 50 | June 25, 2024 | Children's Mercy Park, Kansas City, United States | Peru | 1–0 | 1–0 | 2024 Copa América | |
| 28 | 54 | July 13, 2024 | Bank of America Stadium, Charlotte, United States | Uruguay | 2–1 | 2–2 (3–4 p) | 2024 Copa América | |
| 29 | 55 | September 7, 2024 | Children's Mercy Park, Kansas City, United States | United States | 2–0 | 2–1 | Friendly | |
| 30 | 57 | October 15, 2024 | BMO Field, Toronto, Canada | Panama | 2–1 | 2–1 | Friendly | |
| 31 | 59 | November 19, 2024 | BMO Field, Toronto, Canada | Suriname | 1–0 | 3–0 | 2024–25 CONCACAF Nations League A | |
| 32 | 61 | March 23, 2025 | SoFi Stadium, Inglewood, United States | United States | 2–1 | 2–1 | 2025 CONCACAF Nations League Finals | |
| 33 | 62 | June 7, 2025 | BMO Field, Toronto, Canada | Ukraine | 1–0 | 4–2 | 2025 Canadian Shield | |
| 34 | 62 | June 7, 2025 | BMO Field, Toronto, Canada | Ukraine | 2–0 | 4–2 | 2025 Canadian Shield | |
| 35 | 66 | June 24, 2025 | Shell Energy Stadium, Houston, United States | El Salvador | 1–0 | 2–0 | 2025 CONCACAF Gold Cup | |
| 36 | 67 | June 29, 2025 | U.S. Bank Stadium, Minneapolis, United States | Guatemala | 1–0 | 1–1 (5–6 p) | 2025 CONCACAF Gold Cup | |
| 37 | 68 | September 5, 2025 | Arena Națională, Bucharest, Romania | Romania | 1–0 | 3–0 | Friendly | |
| 38 | 74 | March 28, 2026 | BMO Field, Toronto, Canada | Iceland | 1–2 | 2–2 | Friendly | |
| 39 | 74 | March 28, 2026 | BMO Field, Toronto, Canada | Iceland | 2–2 | 2–2 | Friendly | |
| 40 | 79 | June 18, 2026 | BC Place, Vancouver, Canada | Qatar | 2–0 | 6–0 | 2026 FIFA World Cup | |
| 41 | 79 | June 18, 2026 | BC Place, Vancouver, Canada | Qatar | 3–0 | 6–0 | 2026 FIFA World Cup | |
| 42 | 79 | June 18, 2026 | BC Place, Vancouver, Canada | Qatar | 6–0 | 6–0 | 2026 FIFA World Cup | |
| 43 | 83 | September 26, 2026 | BMO Field, Toronto, Canada | Chile | 1–0 | 1–0 | Friendly | |
| 44 | 86 | November 13, 2026 | Manuel Felipe Carrera Stadium, Guatemala City, Guatemala | Guatemala | 3–0 | 3–2 | 2026–27 CONCACAF Nations League A | |
| 45 | 87 | November 16, 2026 | BMO Field, Toronto, Canada | Guatemala | 1–1 | 4–1 | 2026–27 CONCACAF Nations League A | |

== Hat-tricks ==
| No. | Date | Venue | Opponent | Goals | Result | Competition | Ref. |
|---|---|---|---|---|---|---|---|
| 1 | June 23, 2019 | Bank of America Stadium, Charlotte, United States | Cuba | 3 – (3', 71', 77') | 7–0 | 2019 CONCACAF Gold Cup | |
| 2 | June 8, 2021 | SeatGeek Stadium, Bridgeview, United States | Suriname | 3 – (59', 74', 78' pen.) | 4–0 | 2022 FIFA World Cup qualification | |
| 3 | June 18, 2026 | BC Place, Vancouver, Canada | Qatar | 3 – (29' 45+3', 90+2') | 6–0 | 2026 FIFA World Cup | |

== Statistics ==
As of match played November 16, 2026

Appearances and goals by year
| Year | Apps | Goals |
|---|---|---|
| 2018 | 3 | 3 |
| 2019 | 9 | 8 |
| 2020 | 0 | 0 |
| 2021 | 12 | 7 |
| 2022 | 14 | 4 |
| 2023 | 7 | 4 |
| 2024 | 14 | 5 |
| 2025 | 14 | 6 |
| 2026 | 14 | 8 |
| Total | 87 | 45 |

Goals by competition
| Competition | Goals |
|---|---|
| CONCACAF Nations League | 9 |
| FIFA World Cup qualification | 9 |
| Friendlies | 9 |
| CONCACAF Gold Cup | 8 |
| CONCACAF Nations League qualification | 4 |
| FIFA World Cup | 3 |
| Copa América | 2 |
| Total | 45 |

Goals by opponent
| Opponent | Goals |
|---|---|
| Cuba | 4 |
| Qatar | 4 |
| Suriname | 4 |
| El Salvador | 3 |
| Guatemala | 3 |
| Honduras | 3 |
| Panama | 3 |
| Iceland | 2 |
| Martinique | 2 |
| Ukraine | 2 |
| United States | 2 |
| U.S. Virgin Islands | 2 |
| Aruba | 1 |
| Chile | 1 |
| Costa Rica | 1 |
| Curaçao | 1 |
| Dominica | 1 |
| French Guiana | 1 |
| Haiti | 1 |
| Jamaica | 1 |
| Peru | 1 |
| Romania | 1 |
| Uruguay | 1 |
| Total | 45 |
