= Randy Samuel =

Soccer player (born 1963)

Personal information
- Full name: Randolph Fitzgerald Samuel
- Date of birth: 23 December 1963 (age 62)
- Place of birth: Point Fortin, Trinidad and Tobago
- Height: 6 ft 1 in (1.85 m)
- Position: Defender

Youth career
- Richmond South Warriors

Senior career*
Years	Team	Apps	(Gls)
1983	Edmonton Eagles	?	(2)
1984	Vancouver Whitecaps	0	(0)
1984–1985	Edmonton Eagles		
1985–1987	PSV Eindhoven	5	(0)
1987–1990	FC Volendam	74	(1)
1990–1994	Fortuna Sittard	106	(5)
1995–1996	Port Vale	9	(1)
1997	Harstad IL		
1998	Vancouver 86ers	21	(2)
1999	Harstad IL		
2000	Hampton Roads Mariners	24	(0)
2001	Montreal Impact	4	(0)
Total		243+	(11+)

International career
- Canada U18
- Canada B
1983–1997	Canada	82	(0)
Medal record
Representing Canada
Men's Association football
CONCACAF Championship
Winner	1985 North America
North American Nations Cup
Winner	1990 Canada
- * Club domestic league appearances and goals

Randolph Fitzgerald Samuel (born 23 December 1963) is former soccer player who played as a defender. Born in Trinidad and Tobago, he represented Canada at international level. His 82 international caps were a Canada national team record until he was surpassed by Paul Stalteri in September 2010.

He started his career with the Edmonton Eagles and Vancouver Whitecaps before joining Dutch champions PSV Eindhoven in 1985. Playing just five Eredivisie games for PSV, he moved on to FC Volendam in 1987, becoming a key member of the team until he moved on to league rivals Fortuna Sittard in 1990. Sittard were relegated into the second tier, and Samuel moved on to English side Port Vale in November 1995. Failing to make an impact in England, he left in May 1996 and signed with Norwegian side Harstad IL. He later played for the Vancouver 86ers, the Hampton Roads Mariners, and the Montreal Impact.

Making 82 appearances for Canada between 1983 and 1997, he appeared in all three games of the 1986 FIFA World Cup. He also helped his nation to win the 1990 North American Nations Cup and 1985 CONCACAF Championship. He played at the CONCACAF Gold Cup in 1991 and 1993. In 2012 as part of the Canadian Soccer Association's centennial celebration, he was named to the all-time Canada XI men's team.

== Early life ==
Samuel was born in Trinidad and grew up in Saskatoon, Canada and Richmond, Canada. Growing up, he attended McNair High School in Canada.

== Club career ==
=== North America ===
He was selected by the Vancouver Whitecaps in the 1981 North American Soccer League draft, though he never signed with the club. In 1983, Samuel began his professional career with the Edmonton Eagles of the Canadian Professional Soccer League. He signed with the Vancouver Whitecaps the following year, yet he never played a game for them before returning to the Eagles.

=== Netherlands ===
In 1985, Samuels left Canada for the Netherlands, where he played in the Dutch First Division with PSV Eindhoven. PSV were crowned champions in 1985–86 and 1986–87, but Samuels played just five league games before he moved on to FC Volendam, who were newly-promoted to the top-flight in 1987–88. After a mid-table finish in 1988–89, Volendam missed out on qualification to the UEFA Cup by only two points in 1989–90. He switched to Fortuna Sittard in 1990, who finished mid-table in 1990–91 and 1991–92, before dropping into the Second Division after suffering relegation in 1992–93. After Sittard finished the 1993–94 season mid-table in the Dutch second tier, he left the club and the country. He coached at youth level while playing in the Netherlands.

=== England ===
After a trial at English Football League First Division side Port Vale, he signed forms with the club in November 1995. He got off to a flying start, scoring on his debut in a 1–1 draw with Watford at Vale Park on 18 November 1995. By the end of the year, he was out of action due to a knee injury. He recovered, but failed to return to the first-team and was released by manager John Rudge in May 1996, having made just ten appearances in 1995–96.

=== Norway and back to North America ===
He then moved out to Norway and played for First Division side Harstad IL in 1997. The club were relegated, and the next year, he moved back to Canada to sign with the Vancouver 86ers of the A-League. The 86ers qualified for the Western Conference quarter-finals in 1998, where they were defeated by the San Diego Flash. Samuels returned to Harstad in 1999, now in Group 8 of the Norwegian Second Division.

In 2000, he returned to the North American A-League. He spent the 2000 season with the Hampton Roads Mariners, who lost to the Richmond Kickers in the Eastern Conference quarter-finals. He finished his professional playing career with the Montreal Impact, playing four games of their 2001 season.

== International career ==
Samuel earned his first cap for Canada in a 3–1 loss to Honduras in San Pedro Sula on 11 November 1983. After a further ten appearances in friendly games, the only victory coming against his birth nation Trinidad and Tobago, he played seven of Canada's eight games at the 1985 CONCACAF Championship; they finished above Honduras and Costa Rica in the final round to claim the nation's first major honour in the sport since the 1904 Olympics. Their success won them a place at the 1986 World Cup finals – thus far the country's only appearance at the World Cup finals. Samuel played all three of Canada's games in Mexico; a 1–0 defeat to France and 2–0 defeats to Hungary and the Soviet Union.

Canada missed out on qualification to the 1989 CONCACAF Championship after losing to Guatemala on away goals. However, Samuel continued to feature regularly and appeared in the 1990 North American Nations Cup, which Canada won. He played two of Canada's three games at the 1991 CONCACAF Gold Cup.

He played five of Canada's six group games in the first round of 1994 World Cup qualification, as they finished ahead of Jamaica and Bermuda to qualify for the final round of group games. He played each of the two games against Mexico, El Salvador and Honduras; they finished second behind the Mexicans, meaning they had to beat Australia in a CONCACAF–OFC play-off to qualify. Before this game was the 1993 CONCACAF Gold Cup; Samuels played all three of Canada's games, including the 8–0 capitulation to Mexico in front of 70,000 Mexicans at the Estadio Azteca – the biggest defeat in Canada's history was their last game before the all-important match with Australia. Samuel did not feature in the 2–1 win at the Commonwealth Stadium but did play in the second leg at the Sydney Football Stadium. The Aussies won 2–1 to take the game to a penalty shoot-out, which the "Canucks" lost 4–1.

Samuel won the final 14 caps of his 13-year international career in qualification for the 1998 World Cup. He played all six of the initial group stage games, as Canada finished ahead of El Salvador, Panama and Cuba. He then played eight of Canada's ten games in the final round of qualifying, as they finished bottom of the group behind Mexico, the United States, Jamaica, Costa Rica and El Salvador. He made his final appearance for his nation in the 3–1 defeat to the Costa Ricans in San José on 16 November 1997.

His 82 international caps were a Canadian national team record until he was surpassed by Paul Stalteri in September 2010. Samuel was inducted into the Canada Soccer Hall of Fame in 2006.

== Coaching career ==
In 2010, he was appointed head coach of Lobbans FC in the Vancouver Metro Soccer League. He now also runs his own soccer business in Surrey, British Columbia.

== Career statistics ==
=== Club ===
Appearances and goals by club, season and competition
Club	Season	League			FA Cup		Other		Total	
Club	Season	Division	Apps	Goals	Apps	Goals	Apps	Goals	Apps	Goals
Vancouver Whitecaps	1984	North American Soccer League	0	0						
PSV	1985–86	Eredivisie	0	0						
PSV	1986–87	Eredivisie	5	0						
PSV	Total		5	0						
FC Volendam	1987–88	Eredivisie	25	1						
FC Volendam	1988–89	Eredivisie	26	0						
FC Volendam	1989–90	Eredivisie	23	0						
FC Volendam	Total		74	1						
Fortuna Sittard	1990–91	Eredivisie	28	0						
Fortuna Sittard	1991–92	Eredivisie	32	1						
Fortuna Sittard	1992–93	Eredivisie	16	2						
Fortuna Sittard	1993–94	Eerste Divisie	30	2						
Fortuna Sittard	Total		106	5						
Port Vale	1995–96	First Division	9	1	0	0	1	0	10	1
Vancouver 86ers	1998	USISL A-League	21	2						
Hampton Roads Mariners	2000	USL A-League	24	0						
Montreal Impact	2001	USL A-League	4	0						
Career total			243	9						

=== International ===
Appearances and goals by national team and year
National team	Year	Apps	Goals
Canada	1983	1	0
Canada	1984	3	0
Canada	1985	15	0
Canada	1986	9	0
Canada	1987	0	0
Canada	1988	6	0
Canada	1989	1	0
Canada	1990	1	0
Canada	1991	2	0
Canada	1992	7	0
Canada	1993	11	0
Canada	1994	3	0
Canada	1995	8	0
Canada	1996	6	0
Canada	1997	9	0
Total		82	0

== Honours ==
=== Player ===
PSV Eindhoven

- Eredivisie: 1985–86, 1986–87

Canada

- CONCACAF Championship: 1985
- North American Nations Cup: 1990

=== Individual ===
- Aubrey Sanford Meritorious Service Award: 2001
