= 2023 CONCACAF Nations League final =

Soccer match between international teams

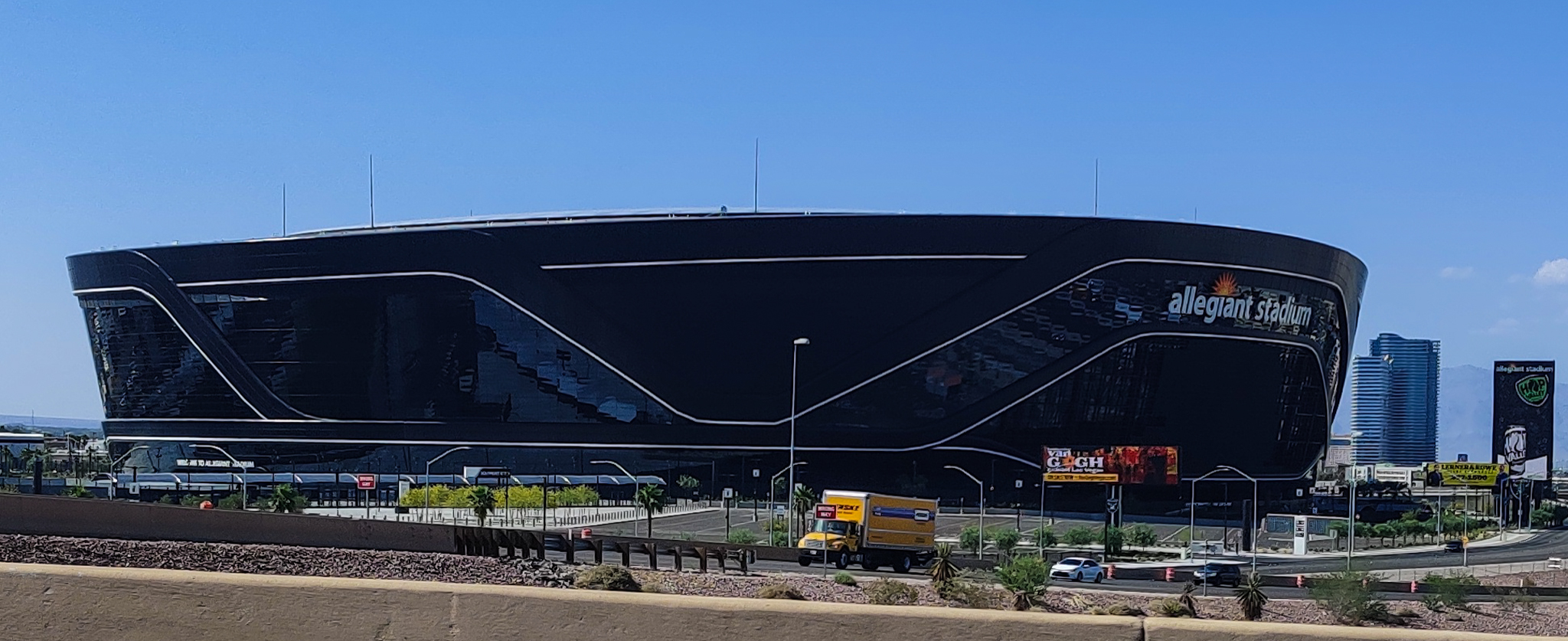
- Allegiant Stadium, the host venue for the final
- Event: 2023 CONCACAF Nations League Finals
| Canada | United States |
| (Canada) | (United States) |
| 0 | 2 |
- Date: June 18, 2023
- Venue: Allegiant Stadium, Paradise, Nevada, U.S.
- Man of the Match: Giovanni Reyna (United States)
- Referee: Saíd Martínez (Honduras)
- Attendance: 35,000
- Weather: Windy, 95 °F (35 °C)

The 2023 CONCACAF Nations League final was a soccer match between Canada and the United States to determine the winner of the 2022–23 CONCACAF Nations League's top division, League A. The match was the second final match of the CONCACAF Nations League, an international tournament contested by the men's national teams of CONCACAF, covering North America, Central America, and the Caribbean. It was played on June 18, 2023, at Allegiant Stadium in Paradise, Nevada, United States, in the Las Vegas area, which had hosted the finals tournament.

The United States won the final 2–0 to secure a second consecutive CONCACAF Nations League title, with goals from Chris Richards and Folarin Balogun in the first half. U.S. midfielder Giovanni Reyna was named man of the match for his two assists. Canada finished as runners-up in their first Nations League final, which was also their first CONCACAF tournament final since the 2000 Gold Cup.

== Venue ==
The 2023 final was played at Allegiant Stadium, an indoor stadium in the Las Vegas-area community of Paradise, Nevada in the United States. The 65,000-seat stadium, primarily home to the Las Vegas Raiders of the National Football League, had a retractable grass surface and was designed to accommodate soccer. The entire Nations League Finals tournament was hosted at Allegiant Stadium with two sets of doubleheaders for both rounds. It was the second CONCACAF tournament final at the stadium, following the 2021 Gold Cup final. The entire 2023 Nations League Finals was played at Allegiant Stadium.

== Route to final ==
Note: In all results below, the score of the finalist is given first (H: home; A: away; N: neutral).

Canada
Round
United States
Opponents
Result
League phase
Opponents
Result
Curaçao
4–0 (H)
Match 1
Grenada
5–0 (H)
Honduras
1–2 (A)
Match 2
El Salvador
1–1 (A)
Curaçao
2–0 (A)
Match 3
Grenada
7–1 (A)
Honduras
4–1 (H)
Match 4
El Salvador
1–0 (H)
Group C winners

| Pos | Team | Pld | Pts |
|---|---|---|---|
| 1 | Canada | 4 | 9 |
| 2 | Honduras | 4 | 6 |
| 3 | Curaçao | 4 | 3 |

Source: CONCACAF
Final standings
Group D winners

| Pos | Team | Pld | Pts |
|---|---|---|---|
| 1 | United States | 4 | 10 |
| 2 | El Salvador | 4 | 5 |
| 3 | Grenada | 4 | 1 |

Source: CONCACAF
Opponents
Result
Nations League Finals
Opponents
Result
Panama
2–0 (N)
Semi-finals
Mexico
3–0 (H)

=== Canada ===
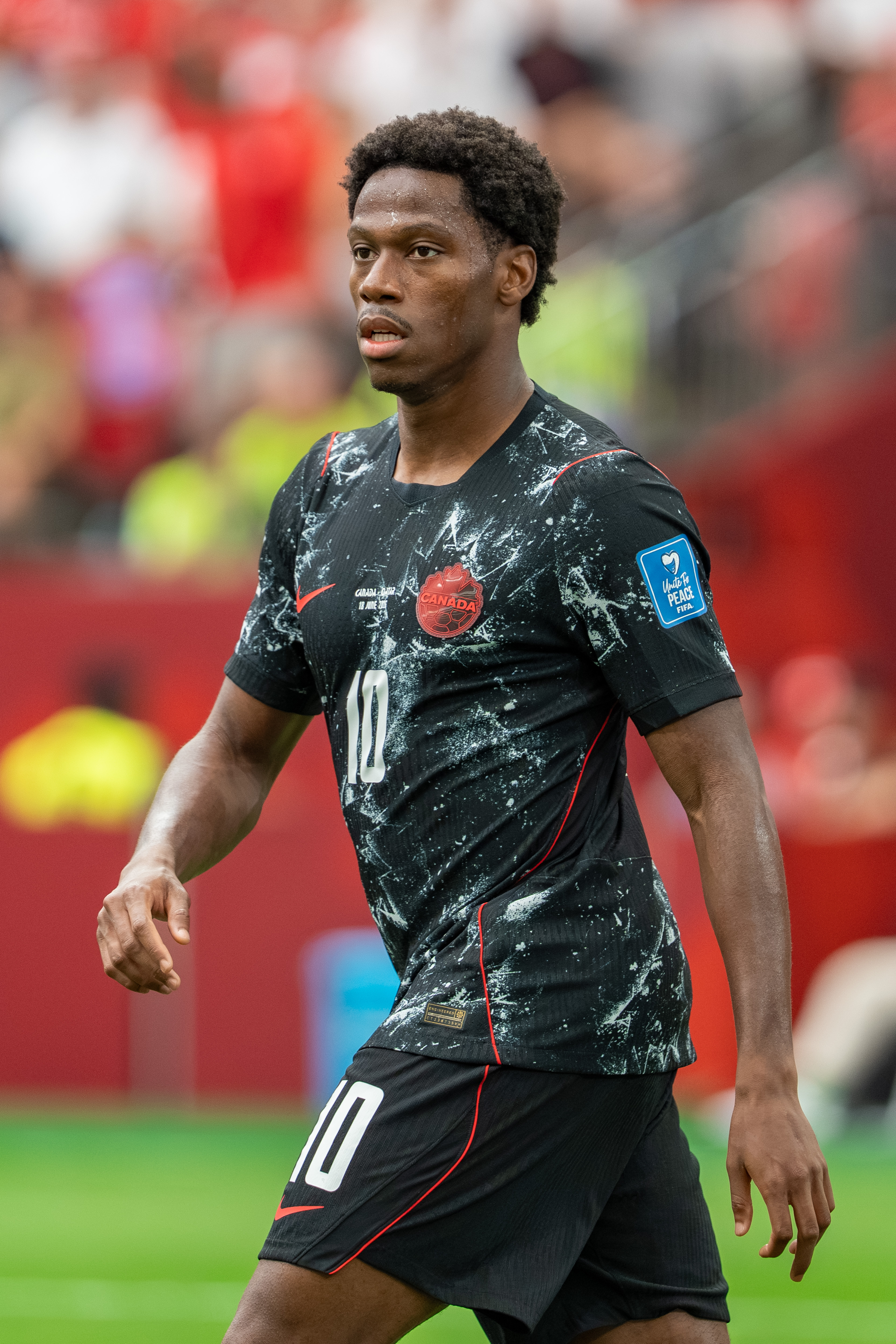
Jonathan David scored four goals for Canada in their run to the final

In the inaugural edition of the Nations League, Canada had been unseeded and qualified for League A after playing through a qualification tournament. They finished second in their League A group behind the United States, tying on points but losing on goal differential. Canada also qualified for the 2021 Gold Cup, where they again finished second to the United States in the group stage but advanced; in the tournament's semi-finals, they lost to Mexico in stoppage time.

For the 2022–23 Nations League, Canada remained in League A and were drawn into Group C alongside Honduras and Curaçao. The team's players were involved in a pay dispute with the Canada Soccer Association and refused to play in a pre-Nations League friendly, but confirmed they would play in the tournament to prevent sanctions. During the June window, they defeated Curaçao 4–0 at home in Vancouver with two goals from Alphonso Davies and lost 2–1 on the road to Honduras. Following their appearance in the 2022 FIFA World Cup, Canada returned to Nations League play in March 2023 with a 2–0 defeat of Curaçao in Willemstad; Jonathan David and Cyle Larin both scored in the first half against the home side, who had a player sent off with a second yellow card. They were tied with Honduras on points and ahead on goal difference; the two teams would play each other in the final matchday. Canada secured their first semifinal berth with a 4–1 victory in Toronto as Larin scored twice and extended his lead as the country's top international goalscorer.

Canada qualified for their first Nations League final with a 2–0 win against Panama in the semifinals. They took the lead in the 25th minute with David's shot through goalkeeper Orlando Mosquera's legs; Davies, who had been recovering from an earlier thigh injury, scored the team's second goal in the 69th minute shortly after entering the match as substitute. The Nations League final was their first CONCACAF tournament final since the 2000 Gold Cup, which they won.

=== United States ===
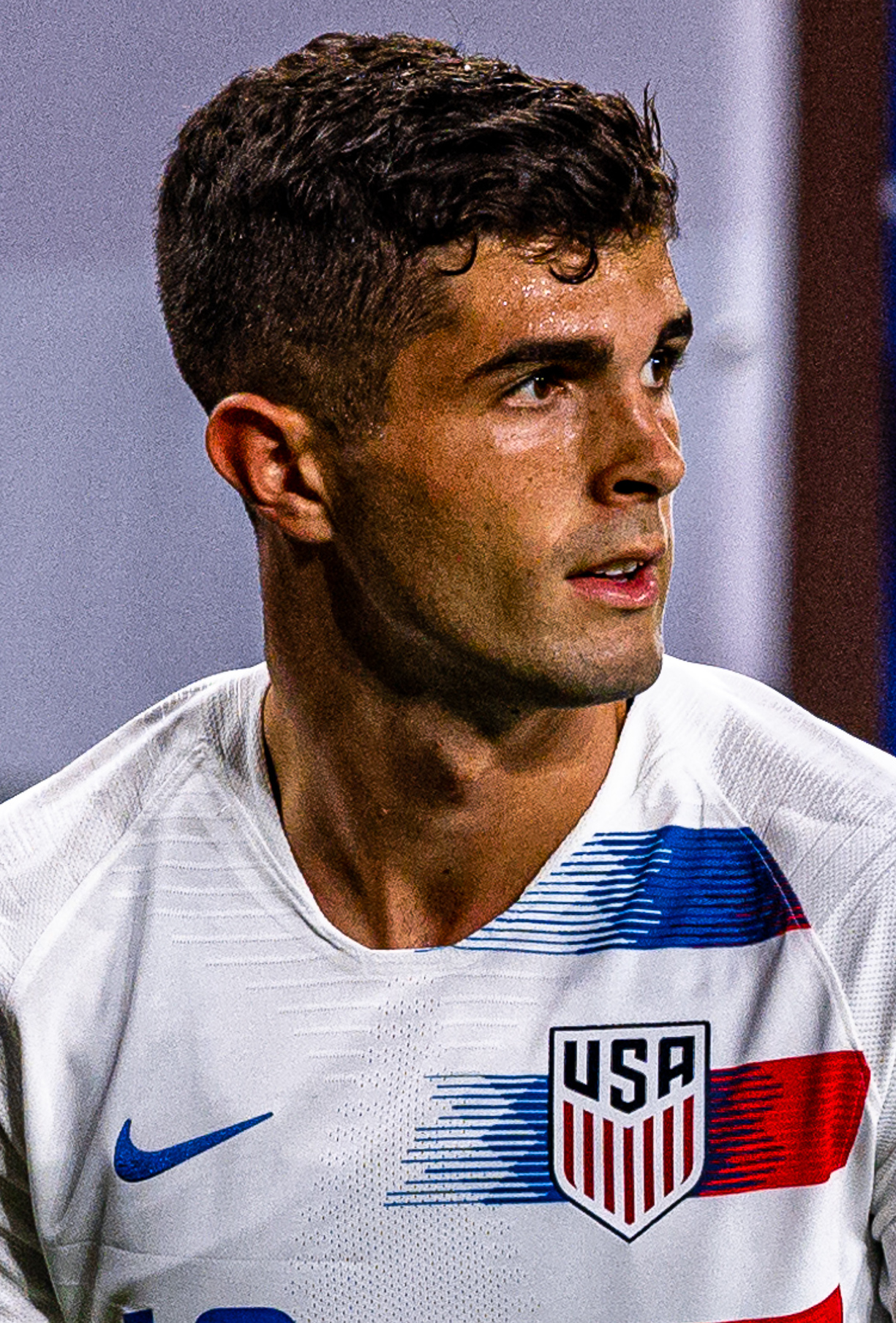
Christian Pulisic scored two goals in the United States's 3–0 win in the Nations League semifinals

The United States were the defending champions of the Nations League and Gold Cup, having won both tournaments in 2021 against long-time rivals Mexico. They were drawn into Group D of League A alongside El Salvador and Grenada, both of whom had been promoted from League B. The United States had secured a World Cup berth—their first since 2014—and 19 players from the qualifiers were called up during the June window for the Nations League and two friendlies. Several key players, including goalkeeper Matt Turner, midfielder Weston McKennie, defender Sergiño Dest, and forward Gio Reyna, were excluded from the roster while they recovered from injuries; among their replacements were Major League Soccer (MLS) players and newcomer dual-nationals from European leagues.

The Americans opened their defense of the Nations League title with a 5–0 victory over Grenada in Austin, Texas, with four goals from Jesús Ferreira and one from Paul Arriola—both FC Dallas players. Their second match, on a muddy pitch at Estadio Cuscatlán in San Salvador, ended as a 1–1 draw with El Salvador following a stoppage time header from Jordan Morris. Both teams had a player sent off earlier with red cards. Head coach Gregg Berhalter was replaced by interim manager Anthony Hudson as the United States returned to Nations League play after the World Cup. Their 7–1 win in Grenada included two goals from Christian Pulisic, two from McKennie, and one from debutant Alejandro Zendejas. The team finished their group stage play by defeating El Salvador 1–0 in Orlando to top Group D with 10 points; Ricardo Pepi scored the lone goal of the match shortly after entering as a substitute.

Hudson was replaced in May 2023 by former Berhalter assistant B. J. Callaghan, who would make his debut as interim head coach in the Nations League Finals' semifinal round against Mexico. Callaghan called up a squad of players from European clubs, choosing to limit their playing time to the Nations League Finals and give them a longer break instead of reusing the same roster for the Gold Cup. The United States earned a 3–0 victory against Mexico in the semifinal, which extended an unbeaten streak against their rivals to six matches. Pulisic scored late in the first half and in the opening minute of the second half before skirmishes broke out between players. Pepi added a third goal that was initially flagged as offside but granted following video review. Four players were shown red cards, including McKennie and Dest, and the match ended prematurely in stoppage time due to homophobic chants.

== Broadcasting ==
The Nations League final was broadcast on television in the United States on Univision and TUDN in Spanish. It was carried in English on Paramount+, an online streaming service, with coverage provided by CBS Sports. The Canadian broadcast was produced by online streaming service OneSoccer and simulcast on Telus Optik TV.

== Match ==
=== Summary ===
The United States entered the final missing several players: McKennie and Dest were suspended, while Miles Robinson was out injured. Callaghan named Joe Scally and Walker Zimmerman to replace Dest and Robinson in the backline, while Brenden Aaronson would replace McKennie in the midfield. It was the youngest-ever lineup for the United States in a tournament final, with an average age of 23 years, 314 days. Canada's starting lineup had two changes from the semifinal against Panama: defender Scott Kennedy replaced Steven Vitória; and midfielder Jonathan Osorio started in place of Tajon Buchanan.

Canada began the match with the majority of possession, but were vulnerable to counter-attacks from the United States. The first goal of the final came from a Reyna corner in the 12th minute that was headed in by Chris Richards from close range. Folarin Balogun—who had recently joined the United States team—missed a header from a set-piece in the 28th minute but scored the team's second goal in the 34th minute. A turnover at midfield allowed Reyna to receive the ball and pass it forward into Balogun's run into the box. A few minutes later, Canada had two chances to score that forced a pair of saves from Matt Turner and a clearance from Antonee Robinson. Richards and Balogun both recorded their first international goals, becoming the first U.S. players to score their debut goal in a tournament final. The United States entered half-time with a 2–0 lead.

Reyna was replaced by Luca de la Torre at half-time due to injury concerns after being tackled by Alistair Johnston in stoppage time. The United States continued to put pressure on Canada and had two chances to score a third goal: Richards collected a misplayed clearance and his header hit the crossbar in the 55th minute; it was quickly followed by a shot by Balogun off a corner kick that was blocked off the line by Kennedy. John Herdman brought on two defenders, as well as Buchanan, in the 61st minute for Canada to change the team's shape as they continued to have the majority of possession but few chances to score; the team's 10 shots were all from outside the penalty area. Cyle Larin missed two chances to score for Canada in the 67th minute—a low shot that was blocked and a follow-up that went over the crossbar. The United States later moved to a three-man defense to close out the match, which ended in a 2–0 victory. Reyna was named man of the match for his first-half performance.

=== Details ===
June 18, 2023
18:00 PDT

| Canada | 0–2 | United States |
|---|---|---|
| | Report | Richards 12'; Balogun 34' |

Allegiant Stadium, Paradise
Attendance: 35,000
Referee: Saíd Martínez (Honduras)

| Canada | United States |

| GK | 18 | Milan Borjan (c) |
| CB | 2 | Alistair Johnston | | (substituted off) 60' |
| CB | 23 | Scott Kennedy | (yellow card) 16' | (substituted off) 61' |
| CB | 4 | Kamal Miller |
| RWB | 22 | Richie Laryea | (yellow card) 45+4' |
| LWB | 19 | Alphonso Davies |
| CM | 7 | Stephen Eustáquio | | (substituted off) 89' |
| CM | 8 | Ismaël Koné |
| CM | 21 | Jonathan Osorio | | (substituted off) 61' |
| CF | 20 | Jonathan David |
| CF | 17 | Cyle Larin | | (substituted off) 76' |
Substitutions:
| FW | 11 | Tajon Buchanan | | (substituted on) 60' |
| DF | 5 | Steven Vitória | | (substituted on) 61' |
| DF | 3 | Sam Adekugbe | | (substituted on) 61' |
| FW | 9 | Lucas Cavallini | | (substituted on) 76' |
| FW | 10 | Junior Hoilett | | (substituted on) 89' |
Manager:
(England) John Herdman

| GK | 1 | Matt Turner | (yellow card) 81' |
| RB | 19 | Joe Scally | | (substituted off) 79' |
| CB | 3 | Walker Zimmerman |
| CB | 4 | Chris Richards |
| LB | 5 | Antonee Robinson |
| CM | 11 | Brenden Aaronson | | (substituted off) 68' |
| CM | 6 | Yunus Musah |
| RW | 21 | Timothy Weah |
| AM | 7 | Giovanni Reyna | | (substituted off) 46' |
| LW | 10 | Christian Pulisic (c) |
| CF | 20 | Folarin Balogun | | (substituted off) 76' |
Substitutions:
| MF | 14 | Luca de la Torre | | (substituted on) 46' |
| MF | 15 | Johnny Cardoso | (yellow card) 80' | (substituted on) 68' |
| FW | 9 | Ricardo Pepi | | (substituted on) 76' |
| DF | 23 | Auston Trusty | | (substituted on) 79' |
Interim manager:
B. J. Callaghan

Man of the Match:
Giovanni Reyna (United States)

Assistant referees:
Walter López (Honduras)
Christian Ramírez (Honduras)
Fourth official:
Selvin Brown (Honduras)
Video assistant referee:
Ricardo Montero (Costa Rica)
Assistant video assistant referee:
Benjamín Pineda (Costa Rica)

Match rules

- 90 minutes
- 30 minutes of extra time if necessary
- Penalty shoot-out if scores still level
- Maximum of twelve named substitutes
- Maximum of five substitutions, with a sixth allowed in extra time (Note: Each team was given only three opportunities to make substitutions, with a fourth opportunity in extra time, excluding substitutions made at half-time, before the start of extra time and at half-time in extra time.)

== Post-match ==
The United States clinched their second consecutive Nations Leagues title and ninth international trophy; as winners of the competition, they also won a $1 million cash prize for the tournament. A month after taking over as interim head coach, Callaghan won his first trophy; he remained as head coach until Berhalter's return after the 2023 Gold Cup. With the victory, the United States also extended their home unbeaten streak against Canada to 22 matches, with their most recent loss in 1957 during qualifiers for the 1958 FIFA World Cup.

Atiba Hutchinson, Canada's captain, retired from international soccer after the match—his 104th appearance for the national team. Herdman attributed Canada's defeat to their lack of resources, as they only had four days to prepare for the tournament due to the financial issues that the Canada Soccer Association faced.
