= List of international goals scored by Cyle Larin =

Larin playing for Canada at the 2026 FIFA World Cup

Cyle Larin is a Canadian soccer player who has represented the Canada men's national soccer team since his debut in 2014. Larin has represented the nation at two FIFA World Cups and five CONCACAF Gold Cups. He made his senior international debut on May 23, 2014, in a friendly against Bulgaria, coming on as a substitute in a 1–1 draw. He scored his first international goal for Canada on March 30, 2015, in a friendly against Puerto Rico, which Canada won 3–0. Across his international career, Larin has scored 32 goals in 95 appearances for Canada. He became Canada's all-time top scorer with 23 goals on January 30, 2022, holding the record until Jonathan David surpassed him two years later.

Larin scored his first and only international hat-trick as Canada opened their 2022 FIFA World Cup qualifying campaign with a 5–1 win over Bermuda on March 25, 2021. Larin became Canada's joint all-time top scorer at 22 goals alongside De Rosario when he scored twice in a 2–1 World Cup qualifying win against Mexico on November 17, 2021. On January 30, 2022, Larin scored his 23rd international goal against the United States, giving him the record outright. Larin's record lasted two years, until David surpassed him as Canada's record goalscorer with his 31st goal on November 19, 2024, in a 3–0 win against Suriname. Larin holds the record for most goals scored during a CONCACAF World Cup qualifying campaign, finishing the 2022 qualification campaign with 13 goals, the highest in the CONCACAF region and the second highest in the World Cup qualification campaign overall.

In 2021, Larin set a men's national team record by scoring 14 goals in a calendar year, including an eight-game stretch in which he scored ten goals. At the 2026 FIFA World Cup, played on home soil, Larin scored the equalizing goal in a 1–1 draw against Bosnia and Herzegovina during Canada's opening group stage game, giving Canada their first ever World Cup point. In the following match, he scored the opening goal in a 6–0 victory over Qatar, Canada's first ever World Cup win, making him the first player to score for Canada in two separate matches of the same tournament.

== International goals ==
As of match played June 18, 2026

Scores and results list Canada's goal tally first, score column indicates score after each Larin goal.

Table key
‡	Indicates goal was scored from a penalty kick

List of international goals scored by Cyle Larin
No.	Cap	Date	Venue	Opponent	Score	Result	Competition	Ref.
1	5	March 30, 2015	Juan Ramón Loubriel Stadium, Bayamón, Puerto Rico	Puerto Rico	3–0	3–0	Friendly	
2	6	June 11, 2015	Windsor Park, Roseau, Dominica	Dominica	1–0	2–0	2018 FIFA World Cup qualification	
3	7	June 16, 2015	BMO Field, Toronto, Canada	Dominica	2–0	4–0	2018 FIFA World Cup qualification	
4	13	November 13, 2015	BC Place, Vancouver, Canada	Honduras	1–0	1–0	2018 FIFA World Cup qualification	
5	19	September 6, 2016	BC Place, Vancouver, Canada	El Salvador	1–0	3–1	2018 FIFA World Cup qualification	
6	25	September 9, 2018	IMG Academy, Bradenton, United States	U.S. Virgin Islands	7–0	8–0	2019–20 CONCACAF Nations League qualifying	
7	25	September 9, 2018	IMG Academy, Bradenton, United States	U.S. Virgin Islands	8–0	8–0	2019–20 CONCACAF Nations League qualifying	
8	26	October 16, 2018	BMO Field, Toronto, Canada	Dominica	5–0	5–0	2019–20 CONCACAF Nations League qualifying	
9	32	March 25, 2021	Exploria Stadium, Orlando, United States	Bermuda	1–0	5–1	2022 FIFA World Cup qualification	
10	32	March 25, 2021	Exploria Stadium, Orlando, United States	Bermuda	2–0	5–1	2022 FIFA World Cup qualification	
11	32	March 25, 2021	Exploria Stadium, Orlando, United States	Bermuda	4–1	5–1	2022 FIFA World Cup qualification	
12	33	March 29, 2021	IMG Academy, Bradenton, United States	Cayman Islands	2–0	11–0	2022 FIFA World Cup qualification	
13	34	June 5, 2021	IMG Academy, Bradenton, United States	Aruba	6–0	7–0	2022 FIFA World Cup qualification	
14	36	June 12, 2021	Stade Sylvio Cator, Port-au-Prince, Haiti	Haiti	1–0	1–0	2022 FIFA World Cup qualification	
15	37	June 15, 2021	SeatGeek Stadium, Bridgeview, United States	Haiti	2–0	3–0	2022 FIFA World Cup qualification	
16	38	July 11, 2021	Children's Mercy Park, Kansas City, United States	Martinique	1–1	4–1	2021 CONCACAF Gold Cup	
17	39	July 15, 2021	Children's Mercy Park, Kansas City, United States	Haiti	2–0	4–1	2021 CONCACAF Gold Cup	
18	39	July 15, 2021	Children's Mercy Park, Kansas City, United States	Haiti	3–1‡	4–1	2021 CONCACAF Gold Cup	
19	41	September 2, 2021	BMO Field, Toronto, Canada	Honduras	1–1‡	1–1	2022 FIFA World Cup qualification	
20	42	September 5, 2021	Nissan Stadium, Nashville, United States	United States	1–1	1–1	2022 FIFA World Cup qualification	
21	44	November 16, 2021	Commonwealth Stadium, Edmonton, Canada	Mexico	1–0	2–1	2022 FIFA World Cup qualification	
22	44	November 16, 2021	Commonwealth Stadium, Edmonton, Canada	Mexico	2–0	2–1	2022 FIFA World Cup qualification	
23	46	January 30, 2022	Tim Hortons Field, Hamilton, Canada	United States	1–0	2–0	2022 FIFA World Cup qualification	
24	49	March 27, 2022	BMO Field, Toronto, Canada	Jamaica	1–0	4–0	2022 FIFA World Cup qualification	
25	53	September 23, 2022	Viola Park, Vienna, Austria	Qatar	1–0	2–0	Friendly	
26	59	March 25, 2023	Ergilio Hato Stadium, Willemstad, Curaçao	Curaçao	2–0	2–0	2022–23 CONCACAF Nations League A	
27	60	March 28, 2023	BMO Field, Toronto, Canada	Honduras	1–0	4–1	2022–23 CONCACAF Nations League A	
28	60	March 28, 2023	BMO Field, Toronto, Canada	Honduras	2–0	4–1	2022–23 CONCACAF Nations League A	
29	66	March 23, 2024	Toyota Stadium, Frisco, United States	Trinidad and Tobago	1–0	2–0	2024 Copa América qualifying play-offs	
30	76	October 15, 2024	BMO Field, Toronto, Canada	Panama	1–0	2–1	Friendly	
31	91	June 12, 2026	BMO Field, Toronto, Canada	Bosnia and Herzegovina	1–1	1–1	2026 FIFA World Cup	
32	92	June 18, 2026	BC Place, Vancouver, Canada	Qatar	1–0	6–0	2026 FIFA World Cup	

== Hat-tricks ==
No.	Date	Venue	Opponent	Goals	Result	Competition	Ref.
1	March 25, 2021	Exploria Stadium, Orlando, United States	Bermuda	3 (19', 27', 68')	5–1	2022 FIFA World Cup qualification	

== Statistics ==
As of match played September 26, 2026

Appearances and goals by year
Year	Apps	Goals
2014	3	0
2015	11	4
2016	5	1
2017	4	0
2018	4	3
2019	4	0
2021	13	14
2022	14	3
2023	7	3
2024	13	2
2025	9	0
2026	8	2
Total	95	32

Goals by competition
Competition	Goals
CONCACAF Gold Cup	3
CONCACAF Nations League	3
CONCACAF Nations League qualification	3
Copa América qualification	1
FIFA World Cup	2
FIFA World Cup qualification	17
Friendlies	3
Total	32

Goals by opponent
Opponent	Goals
Haiti	4
Honduras	4
Bermuda	3
Dominica	3
Mexico	2
Qatar	2
United States	2
U.S. Virgin Islands	2
Aruba	1
Bosnia and Herzegovina	1
Cayman Islands	1
Curaçao	1
El Salvador	1
Jamaica	1
Martinique	1
Panama	1
Puerto Rico	1
Trinidad and Tobago	1
Total	32
