= 2025 Canadian Shield =

Invitational international men's soccer tournament

Tournament details
- Host country: Canada
- City: Toronto
- Dates: June 7–10
- Teams: 4 (from 4 confederations)
- Venue: 1 (in 1 host city)

Final positions
- Champions: Canada (1st title)
- Runners-up: New Zealand
- Third place: Ukraine
- Fourth place: Ivory Coast

Tournament statistics
- Matches played: 4
- Goals scored: 10 (2.5 per match)
- Attendance: 83,468 (20,867 per match)
- Top scorer(s): (Canada) Jonathan David (Ukraine) Oleksandr Zinchenko (2 goals each)

The 2025 Canadian Shield was an invitational international men's soccer tournament held in Toronto, Canada. It was contested by Canada, Ivory Coast, New Zealand, and Ukraine. It served as an unofficial spiritual successor to the Canada Cup tournament. The tournament took place from June 7 to 10, 2025. It is intended to be held annually in the future.

== Format ==
Each team played two matches, with four matches played in total. If a match was tied after 90 minutes, a penalty shoot-out decided the winner. Teams were awarded three points for a regulation win, two points for a shoot-out win, and one point for a shoot-out loss. The team with the most points at the conclusion of the tournament, Canada, were crowned champions and awarded the Canadian Shield trophy.

== Venue ==
Toronto
BMO Field	2025 Canadian Shield is located in Canada
Capacity: 28,180	2025 Canadian Shield is located in Canada

== Teams ==
Team	Confederation	FIFA Ranking (April 2025)
Canada (hosts)	CONCACAF	30
Ivory Coast	CAF	41
New Zealand	OFC	86
Ukraine	UEFA	25

== Results ==
=== Standings ===
Pos	Team	Pld	W	PKW	PKL	L	GF	GA	GD	Pts	Final result
1st place, gold medalist(s)	Canada (C, H)	2	1	0	1	0	4	2	+2	4	Champions
2	New Zealand	2	1	0	0	1	2	2	0	3	
3	Ukraine	2	1	0	0	1	4	5	−1	3	
4	Ivory Coast	2	0	1	0	1	0	1	−1	2	

Source: Instagram
(C) Champion; (H) Host

=== Matches ===
June 7, 2025
15:30

Canada	4–2	Ukraine
J. David 4', 24'; P. David 31'; Buchanan 81'	Report	Zabarnyi 89'; Zinchenko 90+2' (pen.)

BMO Field, Toronto
Attendance: 20,145
Referee: Josué Ugalde (Costa Rica)
June 7, 2025
19:00

Ivory Coast	0–1	New Zealand
	Report	Just 41'

BMO Field, Toronto
Attendance: 26,345
Referee: Pierre-Luc Lauzière (Canada)

June 10, 2025
17:00

New Zealand	1–2	Ukraine
Stamenić 59'	Report	Hutsulyak 54'; Zinchenko 75'

BMO Field, Toronto
Attendance: 18,489
Referee: Carly Shaw-MacLaren (Canada)
June 10, 2025
20:30

Canada	0–0	Ivory Coast
	Report
Penalties
J. David (penalty scored); Choinière (penalty scored); Cornelius (penalty scored); Oluwaseyi (penalty missed); Koné (penalty scored); De Fougerolles (penalty missed)	4–5	(penalty scored) Akpa; (penalty missed) Gbane; (penalty scored) Boga; (penalty scored) Latte Lath; (penalty scored) Kessié; (penalty scored) Diomande

BMO Field, Toronto
Attendance: 18,489
Referee: Filip Dujic (Canada)

== Statistics ==
=== Goalscorers ===
There were 10 goals scored in 4 matches, for an average of 2.5 goals per match.

2 goals

- (Canada) Jonathan David
- (Ukraine) Oleksandr Zinchenko

1 goal

- (Canada) Tajon Buchanan
- (Canada) Promise David
- (New Zealand) Elijah Just
- (New Zealand) Marko Stamenić
- (Ukraine) Oleksiy Hutsulyak
- (Ukraine) Illya Zabarnyi

== See also ==
- Canada Cup
