= Cyle Larin =

Canadian soccer player (born 1995)

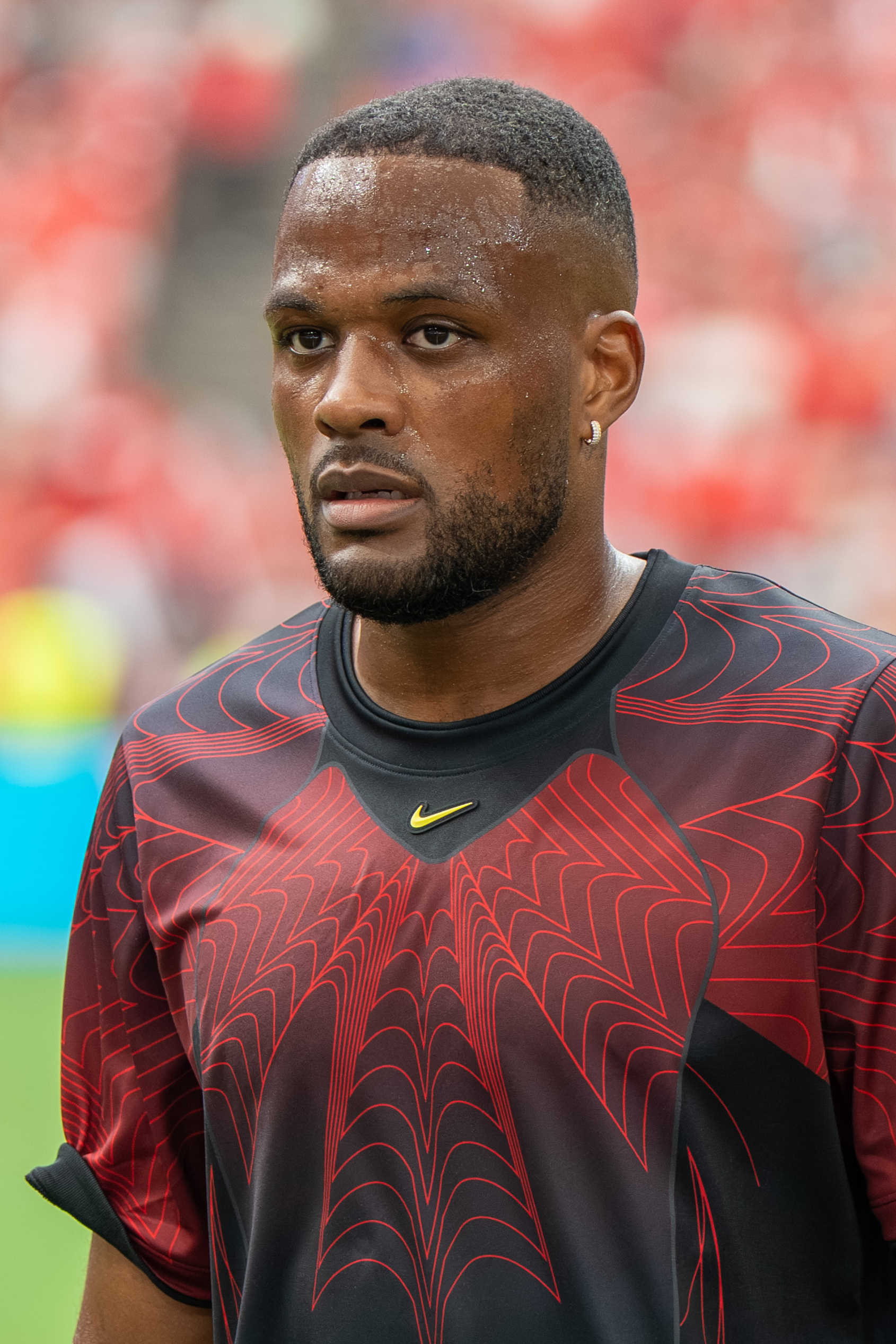
- Larin with Canada in 2026

Personal information
- Full name: Cyle Christopher Larin
- Date of birth: April 17, 1995 (age 31)
- Place of birth: Brampton, Ontario, Canada
- Height: 1.88 m (6 ft 2 in)
- Position: Forward

Team information
- Current team: Southampton
- Number: 9

Youth career
- 2005–2006: Brampton YSC
- 2007–2013: Sigma

College career
Years	Team	Apps	(Gls)
2013–2014	UConn Huskies	39	(23)

Senior career*
Years	Team	Apps	(Gls)
2014	Sigma	5	(4)
2015–2018	Orlando City	87	(43)
2018–2022	Beşiktaş	83	(31)
2019–2020	→ Zulte Waregem (loan)	29	(7)
2022–2023	Club Brugge	9	(1)
2023	→ Valladolid (loan)	19	(8)
2023	Valladolid	0	(0)
2023–2026	Mallorca	67	(10)
2025–2026	→ Feyenoord (loan)	8	(0)
2026	→ Southampton (loan)	16	(8)
2026–	Southampton	12	(8)

International career^{‡}
2015	Canada U20	5	(1)
2014–	Canada	95	(32)
Medal record
Representing Canada
Men's soccer
CONCACAF Nations League
Runner-up	2023
Third place	2025
- * Club domestic league appearances and goals as of 15:42, November 21, 2026 (UTC) ‡ National team caps and goals as of 05:41, September 26, 2026 (UTC)

Cyle Christopher Larin (/ˈkaɪl/; born April 17, 1995) is a Canadian professional soccer player who plays as a forward for EFL Championship club Southampton and the Canada national team.

After playing college soccer for the UConn Huskies, Larin was the first pick of the 2015 MLS SuperDraft, joining Orlando City. In his first MLS season, he broke the record for most goals by a rookie, scoring 17 in 27 games and earning the MLS Rookie of the Year Award. He totaled 89 games and 44 goals for Orlando before moving to Beşiktaş for an undisclosed fee in January 2018. He won the Süper Lig, Turkish Cup and Turkish Super Cup in 2021. He continued playing in Europe with Zulte Waregem and Club Brugge of the Belgian Pro League, Real Valladolid and Mallorca in La Liga, Feyenoord in Eredivisie and Southampton in the EFL Championship.

A full international for Canada since 2014, Larin has represented the nation at two FIFA World Cups (2022 and 2026) and five CONCACAF Gold Cups (2015, 2017, 2019, 2021 and 2025). He was the top scorer with 13 goals in the CONCACAF section of 2022 World Cup qualification, as Canada qualified for the first time since 1986.

== Early life ==
Larin was born in Brampton, Ontario in Canada to a Jamaican family and attended St. Edmund Campion Secondary School, where he was the school's top goal scorer for the final three years that he attended. In 2007, at the age of 11, Larin joined the private soccer academy Sigma of the Ontario Soccer League before graduating in 2013.

During his time at Sigma, Larin travelled to Europe for training periods with Werder Bremen, Hertha Berlin and Wolfsburg in Germany, as well as Racing Genk and Club Brugge in Belgium twice. About the striker, then-Sigma Technical Director Bobby Smyrniotis said: "Cyle is a rare player to find in Canada...a complete and modern striker able to play with both feet, finish from all areas, dominate his region of the park and provide for his teammates."

== College career ==
In 2013, Larin committed to the University of Connecticut. During his first year with the Huskies, Larin scored 14 goals in 23 appearances, the 6th highest goal total in the entire NCAA for the season. His performance during his freshman year earned him multiple honours including Freshman of the Year by TopDrawerSoccer.com and being named to the American Athletic Conference All-Rookie Team.

In January 2014, Larin was touted as one of the best players available in the 2014 MLS SuperDraft. However, he did not sign a Generation Adidas deal with Major League Soccer before the draft and was named the No. 2 best college player available in 2015 if he opted to sign with the league.

In 2014, during the college offseason, Larin rejoined Sigma as they entered the newly formed League1 Ontario. During the season, Larin scored four goals in five appearances for Sigma. During the season, Sigma reached the League 1 Ontario Cup final before ultimately losing 1–2 to Vaughan Azzurri.

Following the 2014 Major League Soccer regular season and during his sophomore season at UConn, Larin was once again predicted to be the No. 1 pick in the upcoming 2015 MLS Superdraft if he opted to sign with the league and not for a European club, which were also rumoured to be interested in the player. At that time, Orlando City held the No. 1 pick in the draft after selecting it in the Expansion Draft held between themselves and fellow-expansion club New York City FC.

== Club career ==
=== Orlando City ===
==== 2015 season ====
In early January 2015, it was announced that Larin had reached a verbal agreement to sign a Generation Adidas contract with Major League Soccer despite interest from European clubs, including a club from the English Premier League. On January 8, 2015, it was officially announced that Larin had signed a Generation Adidas contract with the league, along with four other players. At the 2015 MLS SuperDraft, Larin was selected by Orlando City as the first overall pick as expected, becoming the first Canadian ever chosen first overall in the MLS SuperDraft in the process.

Larin was first included in an Orlando City match on March 13, 2015, remaining an unused substitute in their 1–0 win against the Houston Dynamo. Eight days later he made his debut, coming on as a 71st-minute substitute for Pedro Ribeiro in a 0–1 loss against the Vancouver Whitecaps at the Citrus Bowl. He scored his first professional league goal on April 12, opening a 2–0 away win against the Portland Timbers. Larin scored in his Lamar Hunt U.S. Open Cup debut as Orlando was defeated 1–3 by Chicago Fire in the quarter-finals. On July 18, in a 0–2 home loss to the New York Red Bulls, he was sent off in the first half for a high tackle on Sacha Kljestan; this red card was eventually overturned.

Eight days later, he scored his first professional hat-trick in an MLS fixture against New York City FC. With the hat-trick, Larin became only the 8th rookie to score three goals in an MLS match and only the third player to do so for an expansion side. Larin also became the third Canadian to score three goals in a match, along with Dwayne De Rosario and Tesho Akindele, and the second youngest player to do so behind only Kekuta Manneh, who was 18 at the time of his first MLS hat-trick. He was named MLS Player of the Week for his efforts.

In Orlando's next match, Larin scored two more goals as the club defeated Columbus Crew 5–2, tying him with Damani Ralph's rookie record of eleven goals.

On September 25, against the Red Bulls, he scored his second hat-trick of the season in a 5–2 victory on the road and, in the process, broke the rookie goal-scoring record. In November, having finished his first season with 17 goals in 27 games, Larin won the 2015 MLS Rookie of the Year Award.

==== 2016 season ====
On March 6, Orlando began the new season by hosting Real Salt Lake. Down 2–0 in the fourth minute of added time, Larin scored from Brek Shea's pass and then set up Adrian Winter's equalizer in the eventual 2–2 draw. He scored in each of the team's first three games of the season, the third being the only goal in a win at New York City on March 18. On March 18, he was also awarded Goal of the Week for his goal against Chicago Fire in a 1–1 draw seven days earlier. On August 5, Larin was given his second Goal of the Week award for his goal against the New England Revolution in a 3–1 victory five days earlier. On September 23, Larin was awarded his final Goal of the Week award for his sole goal in a 4–1 loss to Columbus Crew six days earlier.

Larin was selected for the 2016 MLS All-Star Game in San Jose, California, coming on in place of Sebastian Giovinco for the final 14 minutes of a 2–1 loss to England's Arsenal.

==== 2017 season ====
Larin scored the first three goals of Orlando's 2017 season, including a brace against Philadelphia. In the early hours of Thursday, June 15, Larin was arrested and charged with DUI. As a result, he missed three games while under assessment by MLS. After scoring 12 goals in the 2017 season, Larin indicated a desire to move to Europe in the offseason. His last match with Orlando City was a friendly match against Puerto Rico to raise money for the devastation caused by Hurricane María where he scored two goals.

=== Beşiktaş ===
Larin was sold to Beşiktaş in Turkey in January 2018, after refusing to show up to practice with Orlando City, with whom he was still under contract. The transfer fee was undisclosed. On April 7, Larin scored on his debut with Beşiktaş in a 5–1 home Süper Lig win over Göztepe, minutes after entering as a late substitute. In the last game of the season on May 19, he scored a hat-trick in a 5–1 win over Sivasspor also at Vodafone Park.

In the second leg of the second qualifying round against the Faroese side B36 in the 2018–19 UEFA Europa League, Larin scored three goals in a 6–0 win (8–0 aggregate) on August 2. This made him the second player after Demba Ba to bag a hat-trick for the Black Eagles in a European competition. After a difficult 2018–19 season with Beşiktaş, Larin was loaned to Belgian club Zulte Waregem in July 2019. He scored seven times in his season in the Belgian First Division A, including two in a 6–0 win over Cercle Brugge on October 5.

After returning to his parent club, on November 29, 2020, Larin was sent off in a 4–3 home win against Istanbul rivals Fenerbahçe. The following January 6, he scored four times in a 6–0 win over Çaykur Rizespor also at Vodafone Park, and repeated the feat in a 7–0 win over Hatayspor on May 1. He ended the season as a league champion and joint-second top scorer with 19 goals, behind Aaron Boupendza and alongside Mame Biram Diouf, both of Hatayspor.

=== Club Brugge ===
On July 4, 2022, Larin signed a three-year deal with the Belgian First Division A club Club Brugge. He made his debut on July 17 in Brugge's Belgian Super Cup match against Gent, subbing in the second half in an eventual 1–0 victory. Larin scored his first goal on September 10 against Seraing.

==== Loan to Valladolid ====
In January 2023, Larin was loaned to La Liga side Valladolid for the remainder of the season, with an option to buy. He made his debut on January 29 against Valencia, scoring the only goal in a 1–0 victory despite coming on as a late substitute. He scored again in a 0–1 victory on February 5 against Real Sociedad. Larin scored eight goals and assisted three in 19 games, but his club was relegated. His loan was made permanent at the end of the season, for €1.5 million.

=== Mallorca ===
On August 3, 2023, Larin was sold to fellow La Liga club Mallorca on a five-year contract for an estimated fee of €8 million. He scored his first goal for the club on December 9, 2023, producing the only goal of the game against Sevilla. Of the seven goals Larin scored in his first season at Mallorca, four came in the Copa del Rey, including a 120th-minute winner away to Tenerife in the last 16. He played in the final, which the team lost on penalties to Athletic Bilbao.

In his second year at Mallorca, Larin again scored seven goals, which saw him finish the season as the club's joint top scorer.

==== Loan to Feyenoord ====
On September 2, 2025, Larin was loaned to Eredivisie side Feyenoord. He made 15 appearances, scoring once in the Europa League against Panathinaikos, before the loan was terminated on February 2, 2026.

=== Southampton ===
On the same day his loan with Feyenoord was terminated, Larin joined EFL Championship club Southampton on loan for the remainder of the 2025–26 season, with an option for him to move permanently in the summer. On February 7, he scored on his debut for the club shortly after coming on as a substitute in a 1–0 victory against Watford. His loan spell at Southampton was more productive; on May 2, 2026, he scored his ninth goal of the season in a 3–1 victory against Preston North End, his third consecutive match with a goal.

On June 5, 2026, Larin joined Southampton permanently on a two-year contract which started from June 15. On August 29, 2026, he scored a brace in a 5–1 victory against Millwall. On September 11, 2026, Larin was named EFL Championship Player of the Month for August after a run of four goals in three games. The following day, he scored a brace in a 4–1 victory over Bristol City.

== International career ==
=== Youth career and senior debut ===
After Larin's impressive first-year season at the University of Connecticut, Canada national team manager Benito Floro called him in for a senior national training camp in Florida in January 2014 — Larin's first national callup at any level, senior or junior. In May 2014, Larin was included in the roster for a senior training camp in Austria and friendly matches against Bulgaria and Moldova on May 23 and 27, respectively. Larin was viewed as a potential offensive solution for the team which was experiencing a scoring drought of over 900 minutes and winless streak of 15 games entering the friendlies. He made his senior international debut in the match against Bulgaria in Ritzing, coming on as a substitute for Simeon Jackson later in the second half of a 1–1 draw.

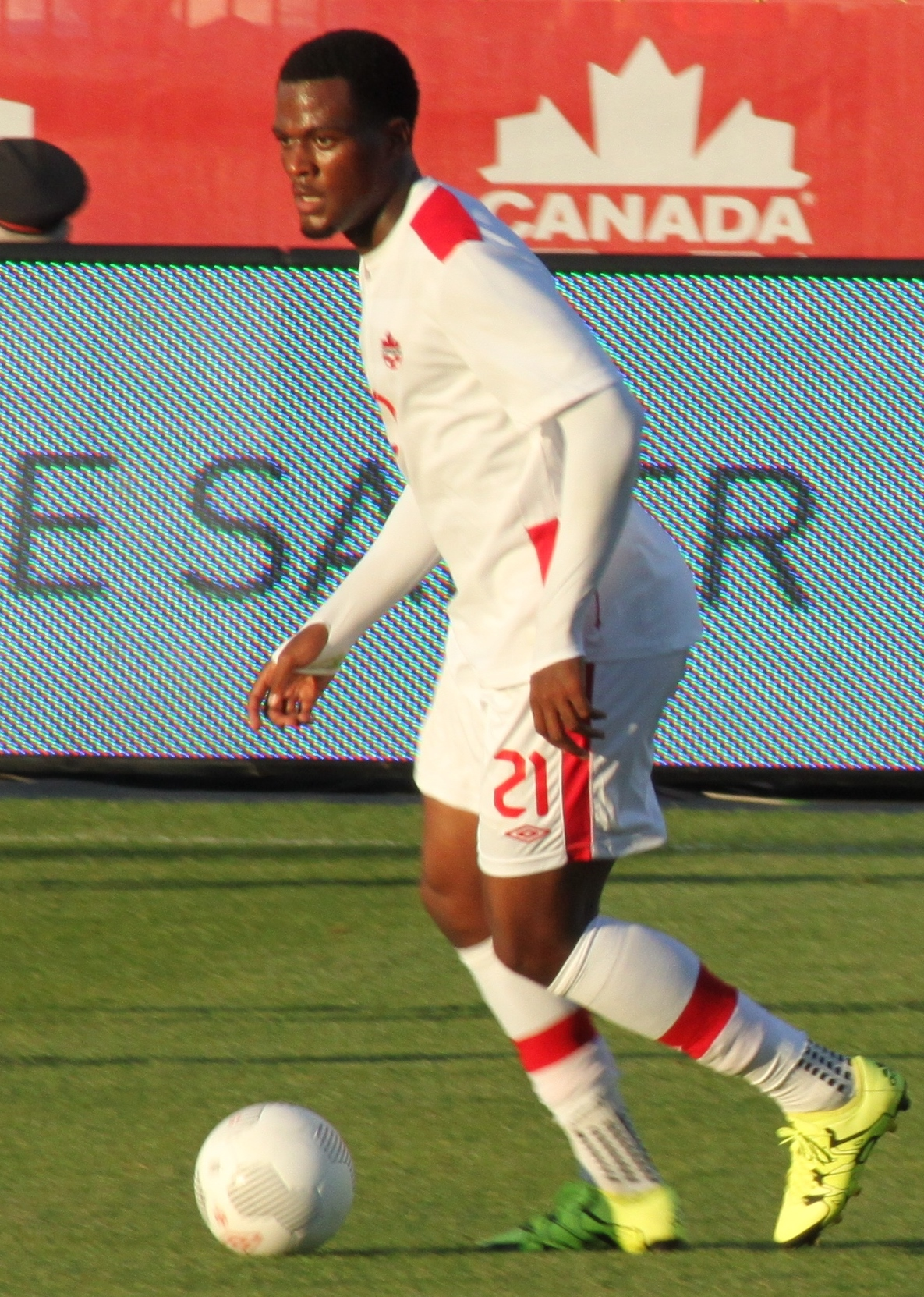
Larin playing for Canada at the 2015 CONCACAF Gold Cup

Larin was named in Canada's 2015 CONCACAF U-20 Championship squad on January 5 that year. Five days later, he made his tournament debut in a 3–1 win over Haiti, as Canada exited in the group stage in Jamaica. He returned to the senior team for friendlies against Guatemala and Puerto Rico in March. He scored his first goal for Canada in the latter match, the third goal in the 3–0 victory over Puerto Rico.

=== 2018 World Cup qualifying campaign and 2015 Gold Cup ===
In June, Larin netted in each leg of Canada's 6–0 aggregate win over Dominica in the second round of qualification for the 2018 FIFA World Cup.

Larin featured in all three of Canada's matches in their co-hosting of the 2015 CONCACAF Gold Cup, the first two as a starter, in a group stage exit. In the team's opening game of the tournament on July 8 at the StubHub Center, he missed an open goal in a goalless draw with El Salvador.

On November 13, in the first match of the fourth round of qualification, he scored the only goal to defeat Honduras at BC Place in Vancouver.

=== 2017 and 2019 Gold Cups ===
Larin was not named in manager Octavio Zambrano's initial Canada squad for the 2017 CONCACAF Gold Cup due to his recent charge for driving under the influence, but was named in the squad for the knockout stage. He started in the quarter-final against Jamaica at the University of Phoenix Stadium, and was substituted for Lucas Cavallini after 56 minutes of the 2–1 loss.

Larin was named to the final 23-man squad for the 2019 CONCACAF Gold Cup on May 30, 2019.

=== 2022 World Cup cycle, 2021 Gold Cup, and Canada's all-time goalscorer ===
On March 25, 2021, Larin scored his first hat-trick with Canada, in a 5–1 win over Bermuda in the team's first 2022 World Cup qualifying match. He was called up for the 2021 CONCACAF Gold Cup on July 1. He scored the equalizer in the team's opening 4–1 win over Martinique and two goals in a victory by the same score over Haiti, as they reached the semi-finals; the brace in the latter game put him at 10 goals in 8 games in 2021.

Larin tied Dwayne De Rosario's record for most goals for Canada (22) on November 16, 2021, scoring twice in a 2–1 home win over Mexico in 2022 World Cup qualifying, a team Canada had not beaten for 21 years. On January 30, 2022, he scored the opening goal of a 2–0 home win in a qualifier against the United States, surpassing De Rosario's record and became the all-time top goalscorer for Canada, a record he held until November 2024 when Jonathan David surpassed him. On March 27, he opened the scoring in a 4–0 win over Jamaica as the Canadians made the World Cup for the first time since 1986. He finished the qualification campaign with 13 goals, the highest in the CONCACAF region and the second highest in the World Cup Qualification campaign overall.

In November 2022, Larin was confirmed as part of the 26-man squad for the 2022 FIFA World Cup. Canada were eliminated in the first round, having lost all their group matches against Belgium, Croatia, and Morocco.

=== 2023 Nations League Finals and 2024 Copa América ===
In June 2023 Larin was called up to the Canadian squad contesting the 2023 CONCACAF Nations League Finals; Canada reached the final, only to suffer a 2–0 defeat against United States.

In June 2024, Larin was named to Canada's squad for the 2024 Copa América, where the team achieved a fourth-place finish, losing 4–3 to Uruguay on penalties in the third-place playoff following a 2–2 draw.

=== 2026 World Cup ===
In May 2026, Larin was named in Canada's squad for the 2026 FIFA World Cup co-hosted in the country. On June 12, he scored the equalizing goal after coming off the bench in a 1–1 draw against Bosnia and Herzegovina during both teams' opening group stage game, giving Canada their first ever World Cup point. In the following match on June 18, he scored the opening goal in a 6–0 victory over Qatar, Canada's first ever World Cup win, making him the first player to score for Canada in two separate matches of the same tournament. Following a 2–1 defeat to Switzerland in the team's final group match, Canada advanced to the knock-out stages of the World Cup for the first time in its history, finishing as runners-up of Group B with four points. After defeating South Africa 1–0 in the round of 32, Canada were eliminated from the tournament following a 3–0 defeat to Morocco in the round of 16.

== Personal life ==
Larin holds a U.S. green card, which qualifies him as a domestic player for MLS roster purposes. In June 2017, Larin was arrested by the Florida Highway Patrol for driving the wrong way on a four-lane road in Orlando and given a breathalyzer test that showed that he was above the legal blood alcohol level. He was suspended from MLS until he completed a league-mandated substance abuse assessment, and this ban was lifted by the end of the month.

In August 2021, Larin joined Canadian club Simcoe County Rovers of League1 Ontario as a co-owner.

== Career statistics ==
=== Club ===
As of match played November 21, 2026

Appearances and goals by club, season and competition
Club	Season	League			National cup (Note: Includes U.S. Open Cup, Turkish Cup, Belgian Cup, Copa del Rey, FA Cup)		League cup (Note: Includes EFL Cup)		Continental		Other		Total	
Club	Season	Division	Apps	Goals	Apps	Goals	Apps	Goals	Apps	Goals	Apps	Goals	Apps	Goals
Sigma	2014	League1 Ontario	5	4	0	0	—		—		—		5	4
Orlando City	2015	MLS	27	17	1	1	—		—		—		28	18
Orlando City	2016	MLS	32	14	1	0	—		—		—		33	14
Orlando City	2017	MLS	28	12	—		—		—		—		28	12
Orlando City	Total		87	43	2	1	—		—		—		89	44
Beşiktaş	2017–18	Süper Lig	4	4	—		—		—		—		4	4
Beşiktaş	2018–19	Süper Lig	12	1	—		—		10 (Note: Appearances in UEFA Europa League)	3	—		22	4
Beşiktaş	2020–21	Süper Lig	38	19	5	3	—		2 (Note: One appearance and one goal in UEFA Champions League, one appearance in UEFA Europa League)	1	—		45	23
Beşiktaş	2021–22	Süper Lig	29	7	3	0	—		5 (Note: Appearance(s) in UEFA Champions League)	1	1 (Note: Appearance in Turkish Super Cup)	0	38	8
Beşiktaş	Total		83	31	8	3	—		17	5	1	0	108	39
Zulte Waregem (loan)	2019–20	Belgian Pro League	29	7	4	2	—		—		—		33	9
Club Brugge	2022–23	Belgian Pro League	9	1	2	0	—		1	0	1 (Note: Appearance in Belgian Super Cup)	0	13	1
Valladolid (loan)	2022–23	La Liga	19	8	—		—		—		—		19	8
Mallorca	2023–24	La Liga	35	3	7	4	—		—		—		42	7
Mallorca	2024–25	La Liga	32	7	1	0	—		—		1 (Note: Appearance in Supercopa de España)	0	34	7
Mallorca	Total		67	10	8	4	—		—		1	0	76	14
Feyenoord (loan)	2025–26	Eredivisie	8	0	0	0	—		7	1	—		15	1
Southampton (loan)	2025–26	Championship	16	8	4	1	—		—		2 (Note: Appearances in Championship play-offs)	0	22	9
Southampton	2026–27	Championship	12	8	0	0	2	1	—		—		14	9
Career total			336	120	28	11	2	1	25	6	5	0	396	138

=== International ===
As of match played September 26, 2026

Appearances and goals by national team and year
National team	Year	Apps	Goals
Canada	2014	3	0
Canada	2015	11	4
Canada	2016	5	1
Canada	2017	4	0
Canada	2018	4	3
Canada	2019	4	0
Canada	2020	0	0
Canada	2021	13	14
Canada	2022	14	3
Canada	2023	7	3
Canada	2024	13	2
Canada	2025	9	0
Canada	2026	8	2
Total		95	32

== Honours ==
Beşiktaş

- Süper Lig: 2020–21
- Turkish Cup: 2020–21
- Turkish Super Cup: 2021

Club Brugge

- Belgian Super Cup: 2022

Individual

- American Athletic Conference Rookie of the Year: 2013
- American Athletic Conference Offensive Player of the Year: 2014
- MLS Rookie of the Year Award: 2015
- MLS All-Star: 2016
- Süper Lig Forward of the Season: 2020–21
- Süper Lig Team of the Season: 2020–21
- EFL Championship Player of the Month: August 2026
