= Jonathan David =

Canadian soccer player (born 2000)

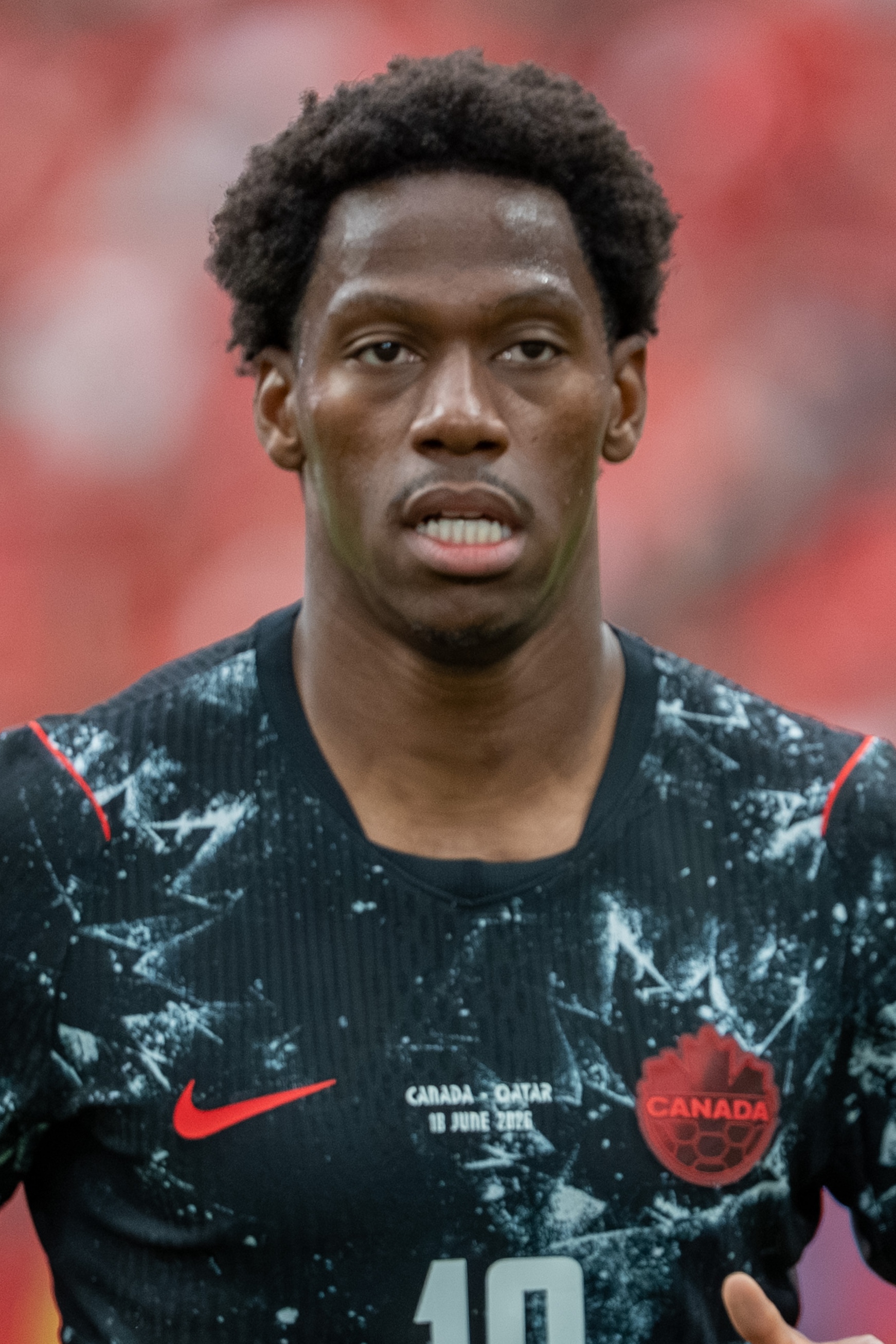
- David with Canada in 2026

Personal information
- Full name: Jonathan Christian David
- Date of birth: January 14, 2000 (age 26)
- Place of birth: Brooklyn, New York, U.S.
- Height: 1.78 m (5 ft 10 in)
- Position: Forward

Team information
- Current team: Atlético Madrid (on loan from Juventus)
- Number: 15

Youth career
- 2010–2011: Gloucester Dragons
- 2011–2015: Ottawa Gloucester Hornets
- 2016–2018: Ottawa Internationals
- 2018–2019: KAA Gent

Senior career*
Years	Team	Apps	(Gls)
2018–2020	KAA Gent	60	(30)
2020–2025	Lille	178	(87)
2025–	Juventus	36	(6)
2026–	→ Atlético Madrid (loan)	7	(3)

International career^{‡}
2017	Canada U17	3	(2)
2018	Canada U21	2	(0)
2018–	Canada	87	(45)
Medal record
Men's soccer
Representing Canada
CONCACAF Nations League
Runner-up	2023 United States
Third place	2025 United States
- * Club domestic league appearances and goals as of 22:00, November 8, 2026 (UTC) ‡ National team caps and goals as of November 16, 2026

Jonathan Christian David (born January 14, 2000), nicknamed “Iceman”, is a Canadian professional soccer player who plays as a forward for La Liga club Atlético Madrid, on loan from Serie A club Juventus, and the Canada national team.

Born in the United States, David moved with his family to his parents' home country of Haiti as a baby and immigrated to Ottawa, Canada at the age of six. Raised in the Franco-Ontarian community of East Ottawa, he played for several local youth clubs before moving to Belgium in 2018, where he recorded his professional debut for KAA Gent. After two seasons at Gent, David joined French side Lille for a reported €30 million, making him the most expensive Canadian transfer to date, the most expensive signing in Lille's history, and the first Canadian to play in France. He won the 2020–21 Ligue 1 title in his debut season before leaving in 2025 as the club's all-time leading goalscorer of the 21st century, third all-time top goalscorer, and all-time leading goalscorer in European competitions.

Known for his prolific goalscoring record at both club and international level, David is widely regarded as one of the best strikers in CONCACAF. As of August 2026, he ranked second among players born in 2000 or later for career goals scored, behind only Erling Haaland. He made his senior international debut for Canada in September 2018 and became his country's all time top goalscorer in November 2024. In 2025, David was named the 2024–25 CONCACAF Men's Player of the Year. He was also named the Canada Soccer Men's Player of the Year in 2019, 2024, and 2025.

== Early life ==
David was born in Brooklyn, New York, to Haitian parents. The family moved to Port-au-Prince when he was three months old. In 2006, they emigrated from Haiti to Canada and settled in Ottawa. David attended the Francophone public school École secondaire publique Louis-Riel. He cites this as a reason for his success, saying: "It helped to always have the ball at my feet when I was at Louis Riel."

David began playing organized soccer at age ten with Ottawa club Gloucester Dragons SC. A year later, he joined Ottawa Gloucester SC, where he played for the club's Hornets team until 2015. In 2016, he joined Ottawa Internationals SC. Growing up, David watched European soccer but not Major League Soccer, as he had no desire to play professionally in North America. Instead, he was singularly focused on playing professionally in Europe. Before signing with Belgian club KAA Gent, David had trials with Austrian club Red Bull Salzburg and German club VfB Stuttgart, but was rejected by both.

== Club career ==
=== KAA Gent ===
In January 2018, David joined Belgian First Division A side KAA Gent. He made his professional debut on August 4, 2018, against Zulte Waregem and scored a goal in stoppage time to salvage a 1–1 draw. Just five days after his league debut, David came in as a second-half substitute in a Europa League third round qualifier against Jagiellonia Białystok, scoring a goal in the 85th minute to secure a 1–0 win for his team.

David continued his scoring streak three days later, coming in as a 71st-minute substitute and scoring two late goals to secure a 4–1 league win against Waasland-Beveren. After scoring five goals in his first five games, Gent signed David to a contract extension through 2022. He further extended his contract by a year to 2023 in September 2019. In the January 2020 transfer window, Gent chairman Ivan de Witte indicated there was significant interest in David from bigger clubs, with his value estimated at €20 million.

=== Lille ===
==== 2020–21: Ligue 1 champion ====
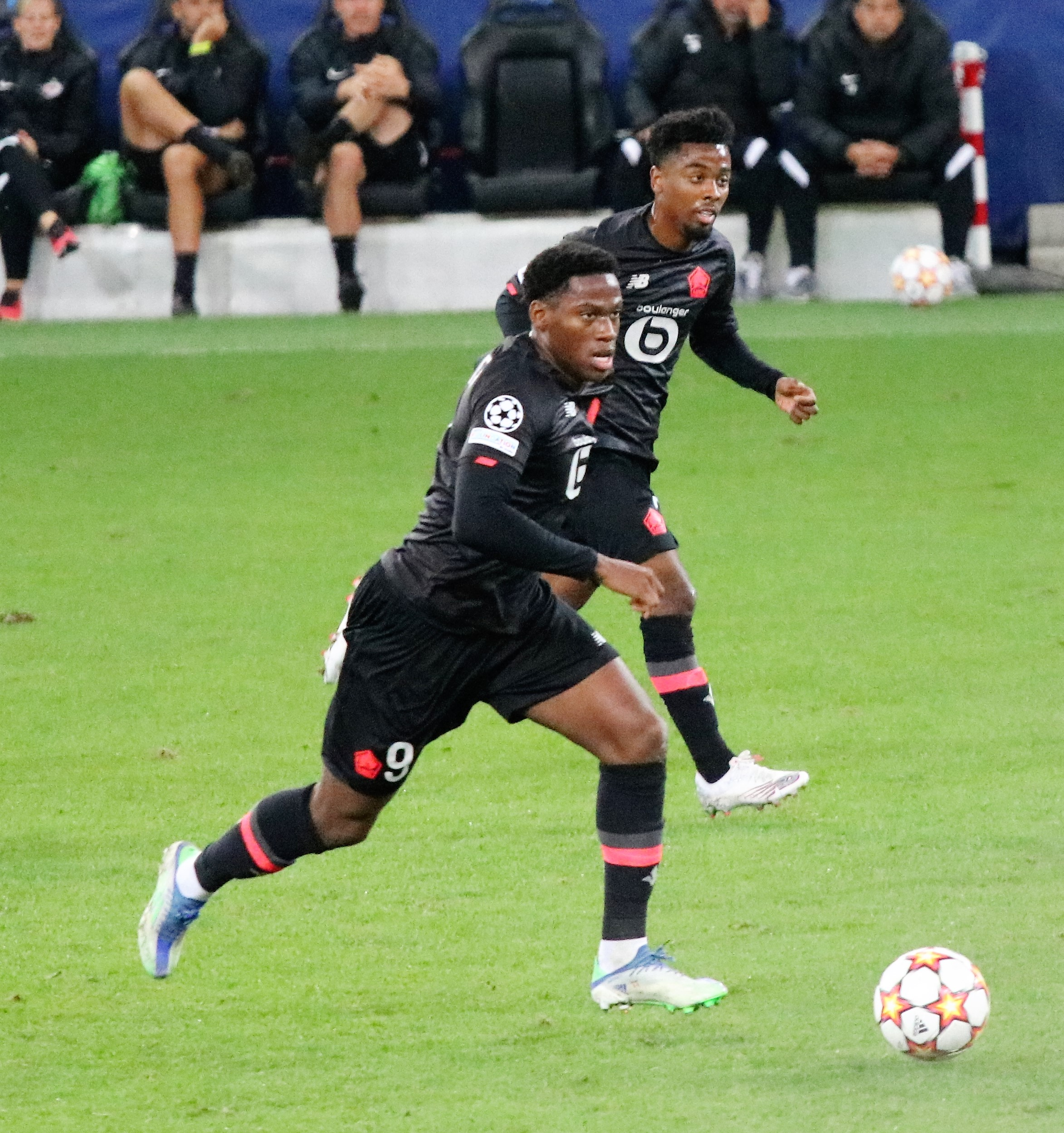
David and Angel Gomes against Salzburg in 2021

On August 11, 2020, Ligue 1 side Lille confirmed the signing of David on a five-year contract. The reported fee for David was €30 million, making him the most expensive Canadian transfer to date. He made his competitive debut for Lille on August 22 against Rennes in their Ligue 1 season opener, becoming the first Canadian to play in Ligue 1. After a difficult start to the season, David scored his first goal for Lille on November 22 against Lorient, netting the final goal in a 4–0 victory, and becoming the first Canadian to score in Ligue 1.

After going scoreless in his previous seven games, David netted an extra-time winner against Reims to even Lille on points with Paris Saint-Germain (PSG) at the top of the table. On February 3, 2021, David scored as Lille defeated Bordeaux by a score of 3–0. Continuing his run of form, David netted his first career Ligue 1 brace, scoring two goals on February 7 against Nantes. After only scoring two goals during the first half of the 2020–21 campaign, this brace marked David's fifth goal in as many games. On April 3, he scored the winning goal in a 1–0 away win over PSG, to be Lille's first away league win over the Parisians since April 1996.

On May 23, he scored a goal in a 2–1 away win over Angers to win the 2020–21 Ligue 1 with Lille. David finished his first season with 13 league goals, with 11 coming since the turn of the year. This included the winner against PSG in a closely contested match at the Parc des Princes and a late double against Marseille, becoming an important player for Lille's title charge and one of the league's most in-form players.

==== 2021–2025 ====
On November 2, 2021, David scored his first UEFA Champions League goal from a penalty in a 2–1 away victory over Sevilla. During the 2022–23 season, he netted 24 goals in Ligue 1, marking his personal best and securing third place on the top scorers list, only behind Kylian Mbappé and Alexandre Lacazette. In the following season, he scored 19 goals, finishing as joint-second top scorer, with only Kylian Mbappé ahead of him. On October 2, 2024, he scored a penalty in a 1–0 victory over defending champions Real Madrid in the Champions League, ending their unbeaten streak since May 2023.

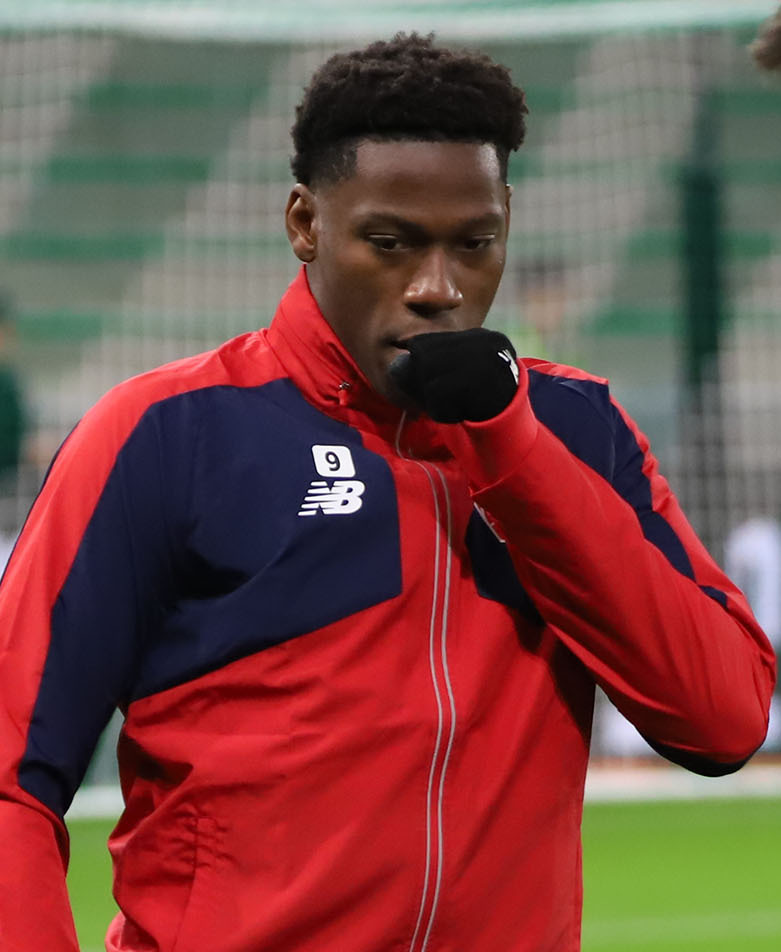
David with Lille in 2024

On September 28, 2024, David scored a hat-trick in a 3–0 away win over Le Havre. On November 5, 2024, on the fourth day of 2024–25 UEFA Champions League league phase, he scored a goal against Juventus and became Lille’s European competitions topscorer with 13 goals. On May 14, 2025, David announced his departure from Lille at the end of the season, concluding a five-year tenure with the club. He left as the club's third all-time top goalscorer.

=== Juventus ===
On July 23, 2025, after 5 seasons with Lille and leaving the club unattached, David signed for Serie A club Juventus until June 30, 2030. The financial details of the agreement include commissions and a bonus-signing of €12.5 million (CA$20.03 million) payable in three seasons. According to various reports, his five-year contract includes an annual salary around €6 million (CA$9.62 million) net plus €2 million (CA$3.21 million) in possible bonus payments per season. On August 24, 2025, David scored in his Juventus debut, their first Serie A match of the season and the opening goal of a 2–0 home win over Parma.

Following a difficult start to the season, David was named player of the match on January 6, 2026, after recording a goal and an assist in a 3–0 win over Sassuolo. On April 19, 2026, David opened the scoring inside the first two minutes of Juventus' 2–0 win over Bologna, heading in a cross from Pierre Kalulu.

==== Loan to Atlético Madrid ====
On September 1, 2026, David signed for La Liga club Atlético Madrid on a loan until the end of the season. On September 20, he scored against Real Madrid, becoming the first Canadian to score in the Madrid derby and the first Atlético Madrid player in 31 years to score in each of his first three league matches for the club.

== International career ==
=== Youth ===
David was first identified by the Canadian youth national team program in 2015 after attending several under-15 camps and was regularly called up to Canada under-17 camps in the lead-up to the 2017 CONCACAF U-17 Championship. David subsequently represented Canada at the tournament, and scored a brace against Suriname in the final group game. In May 2018, David was called up to the Canadian Under-21 team for the 2018 Toulon Tournament. David received a call-up to the United States under-20 team by Tab Ramos in 2018. He declined the invitation to focus on his club career, and because his desire was to represent Canada.

=== Senior ===
==== Debut and 2019 Gold Cup ====
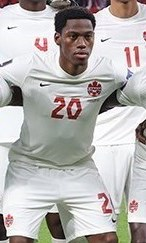
David with Canada at the 2022 FIFA World Cup

David received his first senior call up to Canada on August 30, 2018, for a CONCACAF Nations League qualifier against the U.S. Virgin Islands. He made his senior debut in the match on September 9, starting and netting a brace in an 8–0 victory. David was named to the final squad for the 2019 CONCACAF Gold Cup on May 30, 2019.

In Canada's final group game during the tournament against Cuba, he scored a hat-trick in a 7–0 win. Despite Canada's elimination to Haiti in the quarter-finals, David finished the tournament as the Golden Boot winner with six goals. After Canada's 6–0 victory over Cuba on September 7, 2019, David set the record for most Canada senior international goals in a single year with eight in 2019. For his efforts, he was named the 2019 Canadian Men's Player of the Year.

==== 2022 World Cup cycle ====
On June 8, 2021, David scored his second hat-trick for Canada in a 4–0 win over Suriname in a 2022 World Cup qualification match. He was left out of Canada's squad for the 2021 Gold Cup due to injury, where the team reached the semi-finals. At the end of the 2022 FIFA World Cup qualification campaign, David tallied a total of nine goals, five of them coming from the third and final round. In November 2022, he was confirmed as part of the 26-man squad going to the 2022 FIFA World Cup. In Canada's opening match against Belgium, teammate Alphonso Davies controversially insisted on taking a penalty awarded early on in the match over David who was generally considered the team's best penalty taker. Davies subsequently had his attempt saved by Belgian keeper Thibaut Courtois, and despite dominating the match Canada would go on to lose following a 44th minute Michy Batshuayi goal. The team lost both of their other matches against eventual semifinalists Croatia and Morocco, finishing second to last ahead of only host nation Qatar.

==== 2023 Nations League Finals and 2024 Copa América ====
In June 2023, David was named to Canada's final squad for the 2023 CONCACAF Nations League Finals. David scored Canada's first goal in their semifinal win over Panama, but would be shut out in a 2–0 loss to the United States in the final.

In June 2024, he was named to Canada's squad for the 2024 Copa América. Before the tournament began, new head coach Jesse Marsch confirmed that David would be the team's first choice penalty taker for the tournament. In their second group game, David scored Canada's first ever goal at a Copa América in a 1–0 victory against Peru; this was Canada's first ever win in the competition. When their quarterfinal tie against Venezuela went to penalty kicks, David scored Canada's first penalty en route to a 1–1 (4–3) victory. David did not start his country's third place match against Uruguay, but scored to give Canada a 2–1 lead in the 80th minute. After Luis Suárez equalized in stoppage time, Canada went on to lose 4–3 on penalties despite David scoring his attempt.

==== Canada's all-time top scorer and 2026 World Cup ====
On September 7, 2024, in a friendly against the United States, David scored his 29th international goal in a 2–1 win to become Canada's joint all time top men's scorer alongside teammate Cyle Larin. On October 15, 2024, both David and Larin scored their 30th international goal in a friendly game against Panama national football team. On November 19, 2024, in a 2024–25 CONCACAF Nations League A game against Suriname, he scored his 31st goal and became Canada's sole all time top men's scorer.

With Canada set to co-host the 2026 FIFA World Cup with Mexico and the United States, David assumed an increasingly important role on the squad in the year leading up, due to the absence of Davies from the roster due to repeated injuries. Coinciding with a difficult first club season with Juventus, David's scoring output for country declined over 2025 and early 2026, and he had only two goals in his final nine games prior to the start of the World Cup, both from the penalty spot. David was formally selected to the Canadian World Cup squad on May 29. David struggled in the team's opening match against Bosnia and Herzegovina, and was substituted in the 61st minute, increasing doubts over his role on the team. In Canada's June 18 match against Qatar, David scored a hat trick in a 6–0 victory, the country's first ever World Cup win. He was subsequently named man of the match. He became the first North American player in 96 years to score a World Cup hat trick and the first player to do so on home soil since Geoff Hurst for England in 1966. He also became the second player to score a hat-trick in the tournament, after Lionel Messi did so in Argentina's opening match against Algeria. Following a 2–1 defeat to Switzerland in the team's final group match, Canada advanced to the knock-out stages of the World Cup for the first time in its history, finishing as runners-up of Group B with four points. After defeating South Africa 1–0 in the round of 32, Canada were eliminated from the tournament following a 3–0 defeat to Morocco in the round of 16. Despite scoring a hat-trick in Canada's historic victory in their second group match, the only game in which he scored, David's overall performance throughout the tournament was criticised by the TSN World Cup panel.

== Style of play ==
A versatile forward, David plays primarily as a second striker in a 4–4–2 formation or as an attacking midfielder; he is also capable of playing as an out–and–out striker, and is known for his goalscoring ability. As a second striker, in a partnership he plays just behind the other primary striker. David is able to find gaps in the defence and to attack these areas with his pace, noted for his high top speeds. He is also able to play short passes and combine with teammates to attack the goal area, he is able to play best with his tight control and sharp interplay between teammates. Due to his pace and speed, David is also effective on counterattacks. Moreover, he is known for his tactical intelligence, defensive work-rate, and ability to read the game, as well as his willingness to press opposing players off the ball.

== Personal life ==
David is good friends with former Lille teammates Angel Gomes and Timothy Weah.

== Career statistics ==
=== Club ===
As of match played November 8, 2026

Appearances and goals by club, season and competition
Club	Season	League			National cup (Note: Includes Belgian Cup, Coupe de France, Coppa Italia)		Continental		Other		Total	
Club	Season	Division	Apps	Goals	Apps	Goals	Apps	Goals	Apps	Goals	Apps	Goals
Gent	2018–19	Belgian Pro League	33	12	6	0	4 (Note: Appearances in UEFA Europa League)	2	—		43	14
Gent	2019–20	Belgian Pro League	27	18	0	0	13	5	—		40	23
Gent	Total		60	30	6	0	17	7	—		83	37
Lille	2020–21	Ligue 1	37	13	3	0	8	0	—		48	13
Lille	2021–22	Ligue 1	38	15	1	1	8 (Note: Appearances in UEFA Champions League)	3	1 (Note: Appearance in Trophée des Champions)	0	48	19
Lille	2022–23	Ligue 1	37	24	3	2	—		—		40	26
Lille	2023–24	Ligue 1	34	19	3	3	10 (Note: Appearances in UEFA Europa Conference League)	4	—		47	26
Lille	2024–25	Ligue 1	31	16	3	0	14	9	—		48	25
Lille	Total		178	87	13	6	40	16	1	0	232	109
Juventus	2025–26	Serie A	35	6	2	0	9	2	—		46	8
Juventus	2026–27	Serie A	1	0	—		—		—		1	0
Juventus	Total		36	6	2	0	9	2	—		47	8
Atlético Madrid (loan)	2026–27	La Liga	7	3	0	0	4	0	0	0	11	3
Career total			281	125	22	6	70	25	1	0	374	156

=== International ===
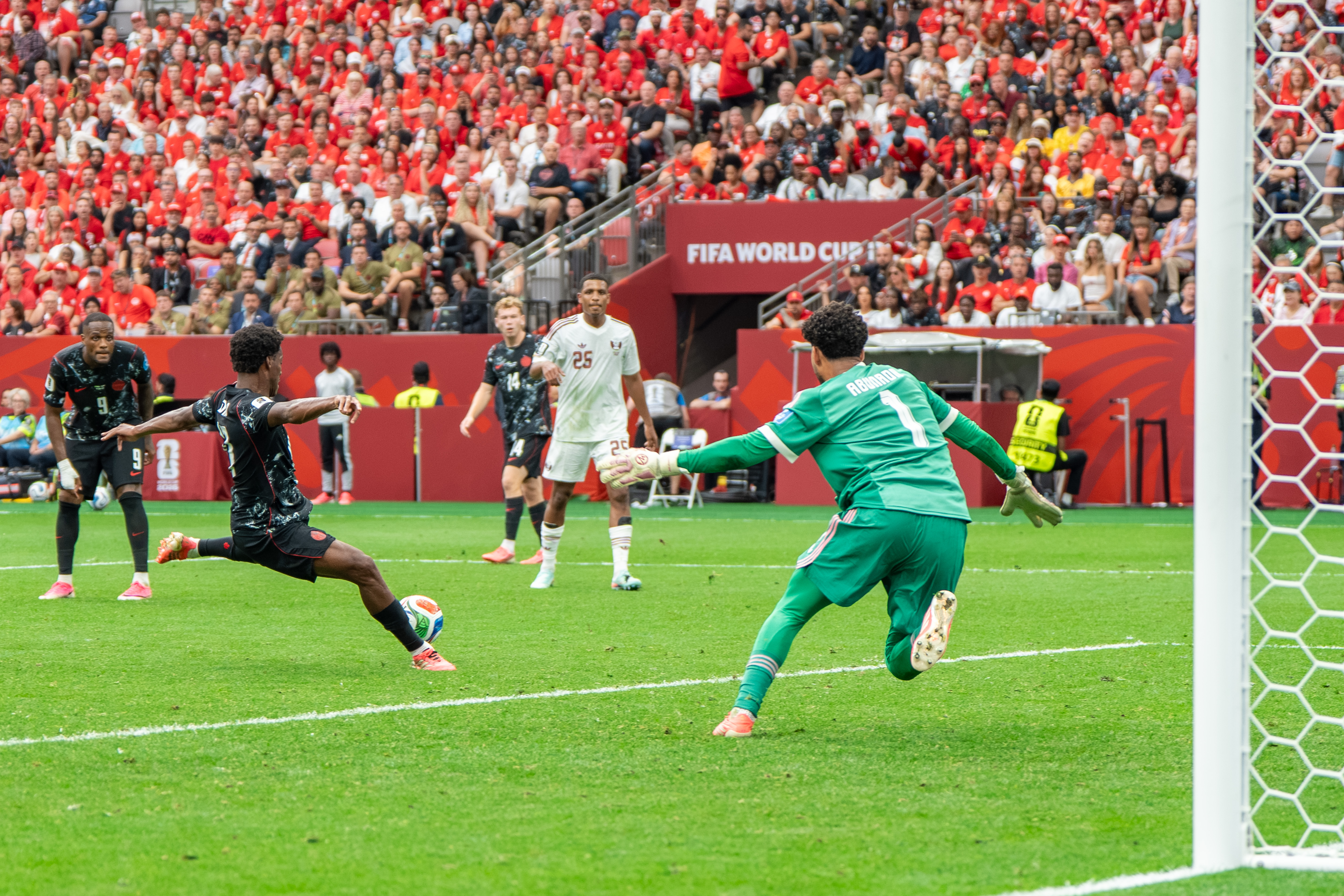
David before scoring his third goal in a 2026 FIFA World Cup match against Qatar

As of match played November 16, 2026

Appearances and goals by national team and year
National team	Year	Apps	Goals
Canada	2018	3	3
Canada	2019	9	8
Canada	2020	0	0
Canada	2021	12	7
Canada	2022	14	4
Canada	2023	7	4
Canada	2024	14	5
Canada	2025	14	6
Canada	2026	14	8
Total		87	45

== Honours ==
Lille

- Ligue 1: 2020–21
- Trophée des Champions: 2021

Individual

- CONCACAF Men's Player of the Year: 2024–25
- CONCACAF Gold Cup Golden Boot: 2019
- CONCACAF Gold Cup Best XI: 2019
- CONCACAF Nations League Finals Best XI: 2023
- Belgian Pro League top scorer: 2019–20 (shared with Dieumerci Mbokani)
- Canada Soccer Men's Player of the Year: 2019, 2024, 2025
- UNFP Ligue 1 Player of the Month: November 2024
- Jean-Claude Bouvy Trophy: 2019–20

== See also ==
- List of top international men's football goal scorers by country
