= 2021 in Canadian soccer =

Soccer in Canada
- Season: 2021

Men's soccer
- Canadian Premier League: Pacific FC
- League1 Ontario: Guelph United F.C.
- PLSQ: CS Mont-Royal Outremont
- MLS Cup: New York City FC
- Supporters' Shield: New England Revolution
- USL1: Union Omaha
- Canadian Championship: CF Montréal

Women's soccer
- UWS: Santa Clarita Blue Heat
- WL1O: Woodbridge Strikers
- PLSQF: A.S. Blainville

Due to the COVID-19 pandemic in Canada, competitions were greatly altered, either starting late, or being curtailed. Due to border restrictions, many Canadian clubs that participate in soccer leagues with American soccer clubs did not participate, or were forced to play some of their regular season matches in the United States.

== National teams ==
When available, the home team or the team that is designated as the home team is listed in the left column; the away team is in the right column.

Win Draw Loss

=== Men's ===
==== Senior ====
| Wins | Losses | Draws |
|---|---|---|
| 13 | 2 | 4 |

===== 2021 CONCACAF Gold Cup =====
====== Group B ======
| July 11 GS 1 | Canada | 4–1 | Martinique | Kansas City, United States |
| 17:30 UTC−5 | Larin 16'; Osorio 20'; Eustáquio 26'; Corbeanu 89' | Report | Rivière 10' | Stadium: Children's Mercy Park; Attendance: 12,664; Referee: Iván Barton (El Salvador) |

| July 15 GS 2 | Haiti | 1–4 | Canada | Kansas City, United States |
| 18:30 UTC−5 | Lambese 56' | Report | Eustáquio 5'; Larin 51', 74' (pen.); Hoilett 79' (pen.) | Stadium: Children's Mercy Park; Attendance: 7,511; Referee: Juan Gabriel Calderón (Costa Rica) |

| July 18 GS 3 | United States | 1–0 | Canada | Kansas City, United States |
| 16:00 UTC−5 | Moore 1' | Report | | Stadium: Children's Mercy Park; Attendance: 18,467; Referee: Adonai Escobedo (Mexico) |

====== Knockout stage ======
| July 25 QF | Costa Rica | 0–2 | Canada | Arlington, United States |
| 19:00 ET | | Report | Hoilett 18'; Eustáquio 69' | Stadium: AT&T Stadium; Attendance: 41,318; Referee: Jair Marrufo (United States) |

| July 29 SF | Mexico | 2–1 | Canada | Houston, United States |
| 21:00 ET | Pineda 45+2' (pen.); Herrera 90+8' | Report | Buchanan 57' | Stadium: NRG Stadium; Attendance: 70,304; Referee: Daneon Parchment (Jamaica) |

===== 2022 FIFA World Cup qualification =====
====== CONCACAF first round ======
| Pos | Team | Pld | W | D | L | GF | GA | GD | Pts | Qualification | Canada | Suriname | Bermuda | Aruba | Cayman Islands |
|---|---|---|---|---|---|---|---|---|---|---|---|---|---|---|---|
| 1 | Canada | 4 | 4 | 0 | 0 | 27 | 1 | +26 | 12 | Advance to second round | — | 4–0 | 5–1 | — | — |
| 2 | Suriname | 4 | 3 | 0 | 1 | 15 | 4 | +11 | 9 | | — | — | 6–0 | — | 3–0 |
| 3 | Bermuda | 4 | 1 | 1 | 2 | 7 | 12 | −5 | 4 | | — | — | — | 5–0 | 1–1 |
| 4 | Aruba | 4 | 1 | 0 | 3 | 3 | 19 | −16 | 3 | | 0–7 | 0–6 | — | — | — |
| 5 | Cayman Islands | 4 | 0 | 1 | 3 | 2 | 18 | −16 | 1 | | 0–11 | — | — | 1–3 | — |

Source: FIFA
Rules for classification: Tiebreakers

| March 25 | Canada | 5–1 | Bermuda | Orlando, United States |
| 20:00 UTC−4 | Larin 19', 27', 69'; Laryea 53'; Corbeanu 81' | Report | Crichlow 63' | Stadium: Exploria Stadium; Attendance: 0 Referee: Armando Villarreal (United States) |

| March 29 | Cayman Islands | 0–11 | Canada | Bradenton, United States |
| 18:00 UTC−4 | | Report | Sturing 6'; Larin 13'; Wotherspoon 25'; Davies 27' (pen.), 73'; Kaye 32', 63'; Johnston 44'; Cavallini 68', 74', 76' | Stadium: IMG Academy; Attendance: 0 Referee: Ted Unkel (United States) |

| June 5 | Aruba | 0–7 | Canada | Bradenton, United States |
| 20:00 UTC−4 | | Report | Cavallini 17', 45+1'; Hoilett 20' (pen.); Brault-Guillard 49'; Davies 78'; Larin 87'; David 89' | Stadium: IMG Academy; Attendance: 45; Referee: Marco Ortíz (Mexico) |

| June 8 | Canada | 4–0 | Suriname | Bridgeview, United States |
| 16:00 UTC−5 | Davies 37'; David 59', 73', 77' (pen.) | Report | | Stadium: SeatGeek Stadium; Attendance: 0 Referee: Nima Saghafi (United States) |

====== CONCACAF second round ======
| June 12 | Haiti | 0–1 | Canada | Port-au-Prince, Haiti |
| 17:00 UTC−4 | | Report | Larin 14' | Stadium: Stade Sylvio Cator; Attendance: 0 Referee: John Pitti (Panama) |

| June 15 | Canada | 3–0 (4–0 agg.) | Haiti | Bridgeview, United States |
| 20:05 UTC−5 | Duverger 46' (o.g.); Larin 74'; Hoilett 89' | Report | | Stadium: SeatGeek Stadium; Attendance: 0 Referee: Rubiel Vazquez (United States) |

====== CONCACAF third round ======
| Pos | Team | Pld | W | D | L | GF | GA | GD | Pts | Qualification | Canada | Mexico | United States | Costa Rica | Panama | Jamaica | El Salvador | Honduras |
|---|---|---|---|---|---|---|---|---|---|---|---|---|---|---|---|---|---|---|
| 1 | Canada | 14 | 8 | 4 | 2 | 23 | 7 | +16 | 28 | 2022 FIFA World Cup | — | 2–1 | 2–0 | 1–0 | 4–1 | 4–0 | 3–0 | 1–1 |
| 2 | Mexico | 14 | 8 | 4 | 2 | 17 | 8 | +9 | 28 | 2022 FIFA World Cup | 1–1 | — | 0–0 | 0–0 | 1–0 | 2–1 | 2–0 | 3–0 |
| 3 | United States | 14 | 7 | 4 | 3 | 21 | 10 | +11 | 25 | 2022 FIFA World Cup | 1–1 | 2–0 | — | 2–1 | 5–1 | 2–0 | 1–0 | 3–0 |
| 4 | Costa Rica | 14 | 7 | 4 | 3 | 13 | 8 | +5 | 25 | Inter-confederation play-offs | 1–0 | 0–1 | 2–0 | — | 1–0 | 1–1 | 2–1 | 2–1 |
| 5 | Panama | 14 | 6 | 3 | 5 | 17 | 19 | −2 | 21 | | 1–0 | 1–1 | 1–0 | 0–0 | — | 3–2 | 2–1 | 1–1 |
| 6 | Jamaica | 14 | 2 | 5 | 7 | 12 | 22 | −10 | 11 | | 0–0 | 1–2 | 1–1 | 0–1 | 0–3 | — | 1–1 | 2–1 |
| 7 | El Salvador | 14 | 2 | 4 | 8 | 8 | 18 | −10 | 10 | | 0–2 | 0–2 | 0–0 | 1–2 | 1–0 | 1–1 | — | 0–0 |
| 8 | Honduras | 14 | 0 | 4 | 10 | 7 | 26 | −19 | 4 | | 0–2 | 0–1 | 1–4 | 0–0 | 2–3 | 0–2 | 0–2 | — |

Source: FIFA, CONCACAF
Rules for classification: Tiebreakers

| September 2 | Canada | 1–1 | Honduras | Toronto, Ontario |
| | Larin 66' (pen.) | Report | A. López 40' (pen.) | Stadium: BMO Field; Attendance: 14,822; Referee: Fernando Guerrero (Mexico) |

| September 5 | United States | 1–1 | Canada | Nashville, United States |
| | Aaronson 55' | Report | Larin 62' | Stadium: Nissan Stadium; Attendance: 43,028; Referee: Oshane Nation (Jamaica) |

| September 8 | Canada | 3–0 | El Salvador | Toronto, Ontario |
| | Hutchinson 6'; David 11'; Buchanan 59' | Report | | Stadium: BMO Field; Attendance: 15,000; Referee: Ricardo Montero (Costa Rica) |

| October 7 | Mexico | 1–1 | Canada | Mexico City, Mexico |
| | Sánchez 21' | Report | Osorio 42' | Stadium: Estadio Azteca; Attendance: 0 Referee: Ismael Cornejo (El Salvador) |
Note: The match is expected to be played behind closed doors due to the behaviour of the Mexican Football team fans during the 2020 CONCACAF Men's Olympic Qualifying Championship.

| October 10 | Jamaica | 0–0 | Canada | Kingston, Jamaica |
| | | Report | | Stadium: Independence Park, Attendance: 0 Referee: Keylor Herrera (Costa Rica) |

| October 13 | Canada | 4–1 | Panama | Toronto, Ontario |
| | Murillo 28' (o.g.); Davies 66'; Buchanan 71'; David 78' | Report | Blackburn 5' | Stadium: BMO Field; Attendance: 26,622; Referee: Armando Villarreal (United States) |

| November 12 | Canada | 1–0 | Costa Rica | Edmonton, Alberta |
| | David 57' | Report | | Stadium: Commonwealth Stadium; Attendance: 48,806; Referee: Ismail Elfath (United States) |

| November 16 | Canada | 2–1 | Mexico | Edmonton, Alberta |
| | Larin 45+2', 52' | Report | Herrera 90' | Stadium: Commonwealth Stadium; Attendance: 44,212; Referee: Mario Escobar (Guatemala) |

==== U–23 ====
| Wins | Losses | Draws |
|---|---|---|
| 1 | 1 | 2 |

===== CONCACAF Men's Olympic Qualifying Championship =====
The draw for the tournament took place on January 9, 2020, 19:00 CST (UTC−6), at the Estadio Akron, in Guadalajara, Mexico. On March 13, 2020, CONCACAF suspended all upcoming Concacaf competitions scheduled to take place over the next 30 days.

On January 14, 2021, CONCACAF announced that the Men's Olympic Qualifying will take place between March 18 and 30.

====== Group B ======
| March 19 GS 1 | Canada | 2–0 | El Salvador | Guadalajara, Mexico |
| 13:30 | Buchanan 17', 21' | Report | | Stadium: Estadio Jalisco; Referee: Fernando Guerrero (Mexico) |

| March 22 GS 2 | Haiti | 0–0 | Canada | Zapopan, Mexico |
| 16:00 | | Report | | Stadium: Estadio Akron; Referee: Juan Gabriel Calderón (Costa Rica) |

| March 25 GS 3 | Honduras | 1–1 | Canada | Guadalajara, Mexico |
| 19:30 | Cornelius 28' | Report | Maldonado 30' | Stadium: Estadio Jalisco; Attendance: César Ramos (Mexico) |

====== Knockout stage ======
| March 28 SF | Mexico | 2–0 | Canada | Guadalajara, Mexico |
| 21:00 | Antuna 58'; Vásquez 65' | Report | | Stadium: Estadio Jalisco; Referee: Juan Gabriel Calderón |

=== Women's ===
==== Senior ====
On December 30, 2021, the women's national soccer team were named the Canadian Press Team of the Year Award.

| Wins | Losses | Draws |
|---|---|---|
| 7 | 3 | 8 |

===== Friendlies =====
| April 9 | Wales | 0–3 | Canada | Cardiff, Wales |
| 18:00 | | Report | Rose 25'; Évelyne Viens 59'; Fleming 63' | Stadium: Leckwith Stadium; Attendance: 0 Referee: Kirsty Dowle |

| April 13 | England | 0–2 | Canada | Stoke-on-Trent, England |
| 19:15 | | Report | Évelyne Viens 3'; Prince 86' | Stadium: Bet365 Stadium; Referee: Cheryl Foster (Wales) |

| June 11 | Canada | 0–0 | Czech Republic | Cartagena, Spain |
| 11:00 UTC+2 | | Report | | Stadium: Estadio Cartagonova |

| June 14 | Brazil | 0–0 | Canada | Cartagena, Spain |
| 13:00 UTC+2 | | Report | | Stadium: Estadio Cartagonova |

| July 14 | Netherlands | 3–3 | Canada | Japan |
| | Miedema 38'; Groenen 51'; Beerensteyn 65' | Report (CBC); Report (Oranje) | Beckie (?); Prince (?) |

| October 23 | Canada | 5–1 | New Zealand | Ottawa |
| 15:00 UTC−4 | Fleming 12' (pen.); Sinclair 41'; Prince 57'; Leon 75', 82' | Report | Percival 71' (pen.) | Stadium: TD Place Stadium; Referee: Danielle Chesky (United States) |

| October 26 | Canada | 1–0 | New Zealand | Montreal |
| 19:30 UTC−4 | Leon 16' | Report | | Stadium: Saputo Stadium; Referee: Diana Stephanía Pérez Borja (Mexico) |

| November 27 | Mexico | 2–1 | Canada | Mexico City, Mexico |
| | Mayor 19' (pen.); Cervantes 76' | | Huitema 86' | Stadium: Centro de Alto Rendimiento; Referee: Francia Maria Gonzalez (Mexico) |

| November 30 | Mexico | 0–0 | Canada | Mexico City, Mexico |
| 16:30 UTC−6 | | Report | | Stadium: Estadio Ciudad de los Deportes; Referee: Katia García (Mexico) |

===== SheBelieves Cup =====
| Pos | Team | Pld | W | D | L | GF | GA | GD | Pts |
|---|---|---|---|---|---|---|---|---|---|
| 1 | United States (C, H) | 3 | 3 | 0 | 0 | 9 | 0 | +9 | 9 |
| 2 | Brazil | 3 | 2 | 0 | 1 | 6 | 3 | +3 | 6 |
| 3 | Canada | 3 | 1 | 0 | 2 | 1 | 3 | −2 | 3 |
| 4 | Argentina | 3 | 0 | 0 | 3 | 1 | 11 | −10 | 0 |

Source: US Soccer
Rules for classification: 1) points; 2) goal difference; 3) goals scored; 4) head-to-head result; 5) Fair Play ranking.
(C) Champions; (H) Hosts

| February 18 | United States | 1–0 | Canada | Orlando, United States |
| 19:00 ET | Lavelle 79' | Report | | Stadium: Exploria Stadium; Attendance: 3,104; Referee: Francia González (Mexico) |

| February 21 | Argentina | 0–1 | Canada | Orlando, United States |
| 18:00 ET | | Report | Stratigakis 90+2' | Stadium: Exploria Stadium; Attendance: 1,348; Referee: Tori Penso (United States) |

| February 24 | Canada | 0–2 | Brazil | Orlando, United States |
| 16:00 ET | | Report | Debinha 14'; Julia Bianchi 38' | Stadium: Exploria Stadium; Attendance: 1,409; Referee: Danielle Chesky (United States) |

===== Summer Olympics =====
====== Group E ======
| Pos | Team | Pld | W | D | L | GF | GA | GD | Pts | Qualification |
|---|---|---|---|---|---|---|---|---|---|---|
| 1 | Great Britain | 3 | 2 | 1 | 0 | 4 | 1 | +3 | 7 | Advance to knockout stage |
| 2 | Canada | 3 | 1 | 2 | 0 | 4 | 3 | +1 | 5 | Advance to knockout stage |
| 3 | Japan (H) | 3 | 1 | 1 | 1 | 2 | 2 | 0 | 4 | Advance to knockout stage |
| 4 | Chile | 3 | 0 | 0 | 3 | 1 | 5 | −4 | 0 | |

Source: TOCOG and FIFA
Rules for classification: Group stage tiebreakers
(H) Hosts

| July 21 GS 1 | Japan | 1–1 | Canada | Sapporo, Japan |
| 19:30 UTC+9 | Iwabuchi 84' | Report | Sinclair 6' | Stadium: Sapporo Dome; Attendance: 0 |

| July 24 GS 2 | Chile | 1–2 | Canada | Sapporo, Japan |
| 16:30 UTC+9 | Araya 57' (pen.) | Report | Beckie 39', 47' | Stadium: Sapporo Dome; Attendance: 0 |

| July 27 GS 3 | Canada | 1–1 | Great Britain | Kashima, Japan |
| 20:00 UTC+9 | Leon 55' | Report | Prince 85' (o.g.) | Stadium: Kashima Stadium; Attendance: 0 Referee: Kateryna Monzul (Ukraine) |

====== Knockout stage ======
Quarter-finals
30 July – Kashima
Great Britain | 3
Australia (a.e.t.) | 4
30 July – Saitama
Sweden | 3
Japan | 1
30 July – Yokohama
Netherlands | 2 (2)
United States (p) | 2 (4)
30 July – Rifu
Canada (p) | 0 (4)
Brazil | 0 (3)

Semi-finals
2 August – Yokohama
Australia | 0
Sweden | 1
2 August – Kashima
United States | 0
Canada | 1

Gold medal match
6 August – Yokohama
Sweden | 1 (2)
Canada (p) | 1 (3)
Bronze medal match
5 August – Kashima
Australia | 3
United States | 4

| July 30 QF | Canada | 0–0 (a.e.t.) (4–3 p) | Brazil | Rifu, Japan |
| 17:00 | | Report | | Stadium: Miyagi Stadium; Attendance: 0 Referee: Stéphanie Frappart (France) |
| | Penalties |
| | Sinclair (penalty missed); Fleming (penalty scored); Lawrence (penalty scored); Leon (penalty scored); Gilles (penalty scored) | | (penalty scored) Marta; (penalty scored) Debinha; (penalty scored) Érika; (penalty missed) Andressa; (penalty missed) Rafaelle |

| August 2 SF | United States | 0–1 | Canada | Kashima, Japan |
| | | Report | Fleming 75' (pen.) | Stadium: Kashima Stadium; Attendance: 0 Referee: Kateryna Monzul (Ukraine) |

| August 6 F | Sweden | 1–1 (a.e.t.) (2–3 p) | Canada | Yokohama, Japan |
| | Blackstenius 34' | Report | Fleming 68' (pen.) | Stadium: International Stadium Yokohama; Attendance: 0 Referee: Anastasia Pustovoitova (Russia) |
| | Penalties |
| | Asllani (penalty missed); Björn (penalty scored); Schough (penalty scored); Anvegård (penalty missed); Seger (penalty missed); Andersson (penalty missed) | | (penalty scored) Fleming; (penalty missed) Lawrence; (penalty missed) Gilles; (penalty missed) Leon; (penalty scored) Rose; (penalty scored) Grosso |

== Men's domestic club leagues ==
=== Canadian Premier League ===
Eight teams play in this league, all of which are based in Canada. It is considered a Division 1 men's league in the Canadian soccer league system.

==== Regular season ====
| Pos | Team | Pld | W | D | L | GF | GA | GD | Pts | Qualification |
|---|---|---|---|---|---|---|---|---|---|---|
| 1 | Forge (S) | 28 | 16 | 2 | 10 | 39 | 24 | +15 | 50 | Advance to playoffs |
| 2 | Cavalry | 28 | 14 | 8 | 6 | 34 | 30 | +4 | 50 | Advance to playoffs |
| 3 | Pacific (C) | 28 | 13 | 6 | 9 | 47 | 34 | +13 | 45 | Advance to playoffs |
| 4 | York United | 28 | 8 | 12 | 8 | 35 | 39 | −4 | 36 | Advance to playoffs |
| 5 | Valour | 28 | 10 | 5 | 13 | 38 | 36 | +2 | 35 | |
| 6 | HFX Wanderers | 28 | 8 | 11 | 9 | 28 | 34 | −6 | 35 | |
| 7 | FC Edmonton | 28 | 6 | 10 | 12 | 34 | 41 | −7 | 28 | |
| 8 | Atlético Ottawa | 28 | 6 | 8 | 14 | 30 | 47 | −17 | 26 | |

Updated to match(es) played on unknown. Source: CanPL.ca
Rules for classification: 1) points; 2) total wins.
(C) Champions; (S) Regular season winner

==== Playoffs ====
Semi-finals; November 20–21
1 | Forge FC | 3
4 | York United | 1
2 | Cavalry FC | 1
3 | Pacific FC (a.e.t.) | 2

Final; December 5
1 | Forge FC | 0
3 | Pacific FC | 1

==== Final ====
December 5, 2021
4:30pm ET

| Forge FC | 0–1 | Pacific FC |
|---|---|---|
| | Report | Hojabrpour 59' |

Tim Hortons Field, Hamilton, Ontario
Attendance: 7,488
Referee: Yusri Rudolf

=== League1 Ontario (Men) ===
16 teams play in this league, all of which are based in Canada. It is considered a Division 3 men's league in the Canadian soccer league system.

==== East Division ====
| Pos | Team | Pld | W | D | L | GF | GA | GD | Pts | Qualification |
|---|---|---|---|---|---|---|---|---|---|---|
| 1 | Vaughan Azzurri | 5 | 4 | 1 | 0 | 14 | 5 | +9 | 13 | Advance to playoffs |
| 2 | Unionville Milliken SC | 5 | 3 | 1 | 1 | 11 | 5 | +6 | 10 | Advance to playoffs |
| 3 | Master's Futbol | 5 | 3 | 1 | 1 | 11 | 8 | +3 | 10 | |
| 4 | 1812 FC Barrie | 5 | 3 | 0 | 2 | 11 | 10 | +1 | 9 | |
| 5 | Darby FC | 6 | 1 | 2 | 3 | 7 | 10 | −3 | 5 | |
| 6 | North Toronto Nitros | 5 | 1 | 0 | 4 | 6 | 12 | −6 | 3 | |
| 7 | Woodbridge Strikers | 5 | 0 | 1 | 4 | 8 | 18 | −10 | 1 | |

Updated to match(es) played on September 17, 2021. Source: Standings

==== West Division ====
| Pos | Team | Pld | W | D | L | GF | GA | GD | Pts | Qualification |
|---|---|---|---|---|---|---|---|---|---|---|
| 1 | Guelph United FC | 6 | 6 | 0 | 0 | 29 | 6 | +23 | 18 | Advance to playoffs |
| 2 | Blue Devils FC | 7 | 5 | 1 | 1 | 19 | 10 | +9 | 16 | Advance to playoffs |
| 3 | FC London | 7 | 5 | 0 | 2 | 17 | 14 | +3 | 15 | |
| 4 | Sigma FC | 6 | 3 | 1 | 2 | 14 | 16 | −2 | 10 | |
| 5 | Scrosoppi FC | 7 | 2 | 1 | 4 | 19 | 14 | +5 | 7 | |
| 6 | ProStars FC | 6 | 1 | 1 | 4 | 12 | 20 | −8 | 4 | |
| 7 | North Mississauga SC | 7 | 1 | 1 | 5 | 8 | 21 | −13 | 4 | |
| 8 | Windsor TFC | 6 | 0 | 1 | 5 | 3 | 20 | −17 | 1 | |

Updated to match(es) played on September 17, 2021. Source: Standings

==== Playoffs ====
Semifinals
W1 | Guelph United FC | 2 (9)
E2 | Master's Futbol | 2 (8)
E1 | Vaughan Azzurri | 1
W2 | Blue Devils FC | 2

Championship Game
W1 | Guelph United FC | 3
W2 | Blue Devils FC | 1

=== PLSQ ===
10 teams play in this league, all of which are based in Canada. It is considered a Division 3 men's league in the Canadian soccer league system.

| Pos | Team | Pld | W | D | L | GF | GA | GD | Pts | Qualification |
|---|---|---|---|---|---|---|---|---|---|---|
| 1 | CS Mont-Royal Outremont | 13 | 10 | 1 | 2 | 27 | 11 | +16 | 31 | 2022 Canadian Championship |
| 2 | Celtix du Haut-Richelieu | 13 | 8 | 3 | 2 | 25 | 18 | +7 | 27 | |
| 3 | A.S. Blainville | 10 | 6 | 3 | 1 | 22 | 8 | +14 | 21 | |
| 4 | CS St-Hubert | 12 | 6 | 2 | 4 | 22 | 19 | +3 | 20 | |
| 5 | CS Longueuil | 13 | 6 | 2 | 5 | 17 | 16 | +1 | 20 | |
| 6 | FC Laval | 12 | 4 | 5 | 3 | 22 | 17 | +5 | 17 | |
| 7 | CS Monteuil | 12 | 3 | 1 | 8 | 12 | 17 | −5 | 10 | |
| 8 | Royal-Sélect de Beauport | 12 | 1 | 1 | 10 | 8 | 32 | −24 | 4 | |
| 9 | FC Lanaudière | 11 | 1 | 0 | 10 | 10 | 27 | −17 | 3 | |
| 10 | Ottawa South United | 0 | – | – | – | – | – | — | 0 | Removed due to border restrictions |

Updated to match(es) played on September 19, 2021. Source: PLSQ

=== Canadian Soccer League ===
8 teams play in this league, all of which are based in Canada. It is a Non-FIFA league previously sanctioned by the Canadian Soccer Association and is now a member of the Soccer Federation of Canada (SFC).

| Pos | Team | Pld | W | D | L | GF | GA | GD | Pts |
|---|---|---|---|---|---|---|---|---|---|
| 1 | FC Vorkuta (C) | 7 | 6 | 1 | 0 | 22 | 1 | +21 | 19 |
| 2 | Scarborough SC (O) | 7 | 5 | 2 | 0 | 19 | 4 | +15 | 17 |
| 3 | Atletico Sporting Toronto | 7 | 4 | 1 | 2 | 13 | 6 | +7 | 13 |
| 4 | BGH City FC | 7 | 3 | 1 | 3 | 10 | 10 | 0 | 10 |
| 5 | Serbian White Eagles | 7 | 3 | 0 | 4 | 8 | 16 | −8 | 9 |
| 6 | Toronto Tigers | 7 | 3 | 0 | 4 | 7 | 15 | −8 | 9 |
| 7 | St. Catharines Hrvat | 7 | 1 | 1 | 5 | 6 | 16 | −10 | 4 |
| 8 | Euru Futbol Academy | 7 | 0 | 0 | 7 | 4 | 21 | −17 | 0 |

Source: Canadian Soccer League
Rules for classification: 1) points; 2) total wins; 3) head-to-head points; 4) goal differential; 5) most goals
(C) Champions; (O) Play-off winners

== Domestic cups ==
=== Canadian Championship ===
==== Bracket ====
The bracket was announced on July 19, 2021.

Preliminary round August 15–26
Ottawa, ON
CPL | Atlético Ottawa | 2
CPL | Valour FC | 3
Halifax, NS
CPL | HFX Wanderers FC | 2
PLSQ | AS Blainville | 1
Toronto (York Lions), ON
CPL | York United FC | 5
L1O | Master's FA | 0
Edmonton, AB
CPL | FC Edmonton | 0
CPL | Cavalry FC | 2
Langford, BC
CPL | Pacific FC | 4
MLS | Vancouver Whitecaps FC | 3

Quarter-finals; September 15–22
Hamilton, ON
CPL | Forge FC | 2
CPL | Valour FC | 1
Halifax, NS
CPL | HFX Wanderers FC | 1
MLS | CF Montréal | 3
Toronto (BMO), ON
MLS | Toronto FC | 4
CPL | York United FC | 0
Foothills County, AB
CPL | Cavalry FC | 0
CPL | Pacific FC | 1

Semi-finals; October 27 – November 3
Hamilton, ON
CPL | Forge FC | 0 (7)
MLS | CF Montréal (p) | 0 (8)
Toronto (BMO), ON
MLS | Toronto FC | 2
CPL | Pacific FC | 1

Final; November 21
Montreal, QC
MLS | CF Montréal | 1
MLS | Toronto FC | 0

==== Final ====
November 21
1:00 pm ET

| CF Montréal | 1–0 | Toronto FC |
|---|---|---|
| Quioto 72' | Report |

Saputo Stadium, Montreal
Referee: David Gantar

== Men's international clubs leagues ==
=== Major League Soccer ===
Three Canadian teams (CF Montréal, Toronto FC, and Vancouver Whitecaps FC) play in this league, which also contains 24 teams from the United States. It is considered a Division 1 men's league in the United States soccer league system.

Overall standings

| Pos | Team | Pld | W | L | T | GF | GA | GD | Pts | |
|---|---|---|---|---|---|---|---|---|---|---|
| 1 | New England Revolution (S) | 34 | 22 | 5 | 7 | 65 | 41 | +24 | 73 | Qualification for the CONCACAF Champions League (Note: As Supporters' Shield winners (USA2)) |
| 2 | Colorado Rapids | 34 | 17 | 7 | 10 | 51 | 35 | +16 | 61 | Qualification for the CONCACAF Champions League (Note: As 2021 MLS Western Conference regular season champions (USA3)) |
| 3 | Seattle Sounders FC | 34 | 17 | 8 | 9 | 53 | 33 | +20 | 60 | Qualification for the CONCACAF Champions League (Note: As highest-ranked U.S. based Division I club (based on 2021 MLS regular season record) not already qualified (USA4)) |
| 4 | Sporting Kansas City | 34 | 17 | 10 | 7 | 58 | 40 | +18 | 58 | |
| 5 | Portland Timbers | 34 | 17 | 13 | 4 | 56 | 52 | +4 | 55 | |
| 6 | Philadelphia Union | 34 | 14 | 8 | 12 | 48 | 35 | +13 | 54 | |
| 7 | Nashville SC | 34 | 12 | 4 | 18 | 55 | 33 | +22 | 54 | |
| 8 | New York City FC (C) | 34 | 14 | 11 | 9 | 56 | 36 | +20 | 51 | Qualification for the CONCACAF Champions League (Note: As MLS Cup 2021 champions (USA1)) |
| 9 | Atlanta United FC | 34 | 13 | 9 | 12 | 45 | 37 | +8 | 51 | |
| 10 | Orlando City SC | 34 | 13 | 9 | 12 | 50 | 48 | +2 | 51 | |
| 11 | Minnesota United FC | 34 | 13 | 11 | 10 | 42 | 44 | −2 | 49 | |
| 12 | Vancouver Whitecaps FC | 34 | 12 | 9 | 13 | 45 | 45 | 0 | 49 | |
| 13 | Real Salt Lake | 34 | 14 | 14 | 6 | 55 | 54 | +1 | 48 | |
| 14 | New York Red Bulls | 34 | 13 | 12 | 9 | 39 | 33 | +6 | 48 | |
| 15 | LA Galaxy | 34 | 13 | 12 | 9 | 50 | 54 | −4 | 48 | |
| 16 | D.C. United | 34 | 14 | 15 | 5 | 56 | 54 | +2 | 47 | |
| 17 | Columbus Crew | 34 | 13 | 13 | 8 | 46 | 45 | +1 | 47 | |
| 18 | Montreal Impact (V) | 34 | 12 | 12 | 10 | 46 | 44 | +2 | 46 | Qualification for the CONCACAF Champions League (Note: As 2021 Canadian Championship winners (CAN1)) |
| 19 | Los Angeles FC | 34 | 12 | 13 | 9 | 53 | 51 | +2 | 45 | |
| 20 | Inter Miami CF | 34 | 12 | 17 | 5 | 36 | 53 | −17 | 41 | |
| 21 | San Jose Earthquakes | 34 | 10 | 13 | 11 | 46 | 54 | −8 | 41 | |
| 22 | Chicago Fire FC | 34 | 9 | 18 | 7 | 36 | 54 | −18 | 34 | |
| 23 | FC Dallas | 34 | 7 | 15 | 12 | 47 | 56 | −9 | 33 | |
| 24 | Austin FC | 34 | 9 | 21 | 4 | 35 | 56 | −21 | 31 | |
| 25 | Houston Dynamo FC | 34 | 6 | 16 | 12 | 36 | 54 | −18 | 30 | |
| 26 | Toronto FC | 34 | 6 | 18 | 10 | 39 | 66 | −27 | 28 | |
| 27 | FC Cincinnati | 34 | 4 | 22 | 8 | 37 | 74 | −37 | 20 | |

Source: MLS
Rules for classification: 1) points; 2) total wins; 3) total goal differential; 4) total goals scored; 5) fewer disciplinary points; 6) away goal differential; 7) away goals scored; 8) home goals differential; 9) home goals scored; 10) coin toss (2 clubs tied) or drawing of lots (≥3 clubs tied)
(C) Champions; (S) Supporters' Shield winners; (V) Canadian Championship winners

=== USL League One ===
One Canadian team (Toronto FC II) plays in this league, which also contains 11 teams from the United States. It is considered a Division 3 men's league in the United States soccer league system.

| Pos | Team | Pld | W | D | L | GF | GA | GD | Pts | Qualification |
|---|---|---|---|---|---|---|---|---|---|---|
| 1 | Union Omaha (C, X) | 28 | 14 | 9 | 5 | 44 | 22 | +22 | 51 | Qualification for the semi-finals |
| 2 | Greenville Triumph SC | 28 | 12 | 9 | 7 | 36 | 29 | +7 | 45 | Qualification for the semi-finals |
| 3 | Chattanooga Red Wolves SC | 28 | 11 | 11 | 6 | 37 | 29 | +8 | 44 | Qualification for the play-offs |
| 4 | FC Tucson | 28 | 11 | 7 | 10 | 44 | 42 | +2 | 40 | Qualification for the play-offs |
| 5 | Richmond Kickers | 28 | 11 | 7 | 10 | 35 | 36 | −1 | 40 | Qualification for the play-offs |
| 6 | North Texas SC | 28 | 10 | 10 | 8 | 40 | 32 | +8 | 40 | Qualification for the play-offs |
| 7 | Toronto FC II | 28 | 10 | 8 | 10 | 34 | 32 | +2 | 38 | |
| 8 | New England Revolution II | 28 | 11 | 4 | 13 | 33 | 39 | −6 | 37 | |
| 9 | Forward Madison FC | 28 | 8 | 12 | 8 | 32 | 34 | −2 | 36 | |
| 10 | Fort Lauderdale CF | 28 | 8 | 7 | 13 | 40 | 49 | −9 | 31 | |
| 11 | Tormenta FC | 28 | 8 | 6 | 14 | 36 | 47 | −11 | 30 | |
| 12 | North Carolina FC | 28 | 7 | 4 | 17 | 30 | 50 | −20 | 25 | |

Source: USL League One
Rules for classification: 1) points; 2) total wins; 3) total goal differential; 4) total goals scored; 5) points earned against top four Conference finishers; 6) disciplinary points; 7) drawing of lots.
(C) Champions; (X) Regular Season Champion

== Women's club leagues ==
=== National Women's Soccer League ===
No Canadian teams play in this league, though players from the Canada women's national soccer team are allocated to its teams by the Canadian Soccer Association. It is considered a Division 1 women's league in the United States soccer league system.

=== United Women's Soccer ===
One Canadian team (Calgary Foothills WFC) plays in this league, which also contains 44 teams from the United States. It is considered a Division 2 women's league in the United States soccer league system.

==== West Conference ====
| Pos | Team | Pld | W | L | T | GF | GA | GD | Pts | Qualification |
|---|---|---|---|---|---|---|---|---|---|---|
| 1 | Santa Clarita Blue Heat (C) | 6 | 4 | 0 | 2 | 16 | 4 | +12 | 14 | 2021 UWS National Playoffs |
| 2 | Calgary Foothills WFC | 4 | 2 | 1 | 1 | 12 | 3 | +9 | 7 | |
| 3 | SASA Impact FC | 4 | 2 | 2 | 0 | 7 | 7 | 0 | 6 | |
| 4 | Kongo SC | 6 | 1 | 4 | 1 | 4 | 21 | −17 | 4 | |
| 5 | Internacional CA | 4 | 0 | 2 | 2 | 3 | 7 | −4 | 2 | |

Source: UWS standings
Rules for classification: 1) Head-to-head based on total points; 2) Total wins; 3) Goal difference all league games; 4) Goals scored in league games
(C) Champions

=== League1 Ontario (Women) ===
14 teams play in this league, all of which are based in Canada.

==== Main Division ====
| Pos | Team | Pld | W | D | L | GF | GA | GD | Pts | |
|---|---|---|---|---|---|---|---|---|---|---|
| 1 | FC London | 6 | 6 | 0 | 0 | 15 | 3 | +12 | 18 | Advance to playoffs |
| 2 | Hamilton United | 7 | 4 | 0 | 3 | 15 | 7 | +8 | 12 | Advance to playoffs |
| 3 | Blue Devils FC | 7 | 4 | 0 | 3 | 8 | 9 | −1 | 12 | Advance to playoffs |
| 4 | Vaughan Azzurri | 7 | 3 | 1 | 3 | 8 | 9 | −1 | 10 | Advance to playoffs |
| 5 | Woodbridge Strikers | 6 | 2 | 1 | 3 | 5 | 6 | −1 | 7 | |
| 6 | North Toronto Nitros | 7 | 2 | 0 | 5 | 6 | 14 | −8 | 6 | |
| 7 | Tecumseh SC | 6 | 1 | 0 | 5 | 2 | 11 | −9 | 3 | |

Updated to match(es) played on September 17, 2021. Source: Standings

==== Playoffs ====
Semifinals
1 | FC London | 1
4 | Blue Devils FC | 2
2 | Woodbridge Strikers | 1(4)
3 | Vaughan Azzurri | 1(3)

Championship Game
4 | Blue Devils FC | 0
2 | Woodbridge Strikers | 1

==== Summer Championship Division ====
| Pos | Team | Pld | W | D | L | GF | GA | GD | Pts |
|---|---|---|---|---|---|---|---|---|---|
| 1 | Guelph Union | 6 | 6 | 0 | 0 | 17 | 1 | +16 | 18 |
| 2 | Vaughan Azzurri B | 6 | 3 | 1 | 2 | 10 | 9 | +1 | 10 |
| 3 | Blue Devils FC B | 6 | 3 | 0 | 3 | 13 | 11 | +2 | 9 |
| 4 | Waterloo United | 6 | 2 | 1 | 3 | 10 | 9 | +1 | 7 |
| 5 | Unionville Milliken SC | 6 | 2 | 1 | 3 | 13 | 13 | 0 | 7 |
| 6 | Blue Devils FC C | 6 | 1 | 2 | 3 | 10 | 23 | −13 | 5 |
| 7 | Darby FC | 6 | 1 | 1 | 4 | 7 | 14 | −7 | 4 |

Source: Standings

=== Première Ligue de soccer du Québec (Women) ===
==== Standings ====
| Pos | Team | Pld | W | D | L | GF | GA | GD | Pts | Qualification |
|---|---|---|---|---|---|---|---|---|---|---|
| 1 | A.S. Blainville (C) | 9 | 7 | 1 | 1 | 25 | 4 | +21 | 22 | Qualify for Coupe PLSQ |
| 2 | CS Monteuil | 9 | 6 | 3 | 0 | 23 | 6 | +17 | 21 (Note: CS Monteuil had a better goal differential than Royal-Sélect de Beauport.) | Qualify for Coupe PLSQ |
| 3 | Royal-Sélect de Beauport | 9 | 6 | 3 | 0 | 22 | 7 | +15 | 21 | Qualify for Coupe PLSQ |
| 4 | Pierrefonds FC | 9 | 6 | 1 | 2 | 23 | 14 | +9 | 19 | Qualify for Coupe PLSQ |
| 5 | Celtix du Haut-Richelieu | 9 | 3 | 2 | 4 | 16 | 19 | −3 | 11 (Note: Celtix du Haut-Richelieu beat CS Mont-Royal Outremont and Ottawa South United on head-to-head points (6–1–1).) | |
| 6 | CS Mont-Royal Outremont | 9 | 3 | 2 | 4 | 10 | 11 | −1 | 11 (Note: CS Mont-Royal Outremont had a better goal differential than Ottawa South United.) | |
| 7 | Ottawa South United | 9 | 3 | 2 | 4 | 15 | 18 | −3 | 11 | |
| 8 | CS St-Hubert | 9 | 1 | 2 | 6 | 5 | 24 | −19 | 5 | |
| 9 | FC Laval | 9 | 1 | 0 | 8 | 9 | 28 | −19 | 3 | |
| 10 | CS Longueuil | 9 | 0 | 2 | 7 | 7 | 24 | −17 | 2 | |

Source: PLSQ
Rules for classification: 1) points; 2) total wins; 3) head-to-head points; 4) goal differential; 5) most goals
(C) Champions

==== Playoffs ====
Semi-finals
1 | AS Blainville | 3
4 | Pierrefonds FC | 0
2 | CS Monteuil | 3
3 | Royal-Sélect de Beauport | 1

Final
1 | AS Blainville | 1
2 | CS Monteuil | 0

== Men's international club competitions ==
=== CONCACAF competitions ===
| Club | Competition | Final round |
|---|---|---|
| Toronto FC | 2021 CONCACAF Champions League | Quarter-finals |
| Forge | 2021 CONCACAF League | Semi-finals |

==== CONCACAF Champions League ====
Teams in bold advanced in the competition.

Round of 16

| Team 1 | Agg. | Team 2 | 1st leg | 2nd leg |
|---|---|---|---|---|
| León (Mexico) | 2–3 | (Canada) **Toronto FC** | 1–1 | 1–2 |

Quarter-finals

| Team 1 | Agg. | Team 2 | 1st leg | 2nd leg |
|---|---|---|---|---|
| Toronto FC (Canada) | 1–4 | (Mexico) **Cruz Azul** | 1–3 | 0–1 |

==== CONCACAF League ====
Teams in bold advanced in the competition.

===== Preliminary round =====
| Team 1 | Agg. | Team 2 | 1st leg | 2nd leg |
|---|---|---|---|---|
| **Forge** (Canada) | 5–3 | (El Salvador) FAS | 3–1 | 2–2 |

===== Round of 16 =====
| Team 1 | Agg. | Team 2 | 1st leg | 2nd leg |
|---|---|---|---|---|
| **Forge FC** (Canada) | 2–0 | (Panama) Independiente | 0–0 | 2–0 |

===== Quarter-finals =====
| Team 1 | Agg. | Team 2 | 1st leg | 2nd leg |
|---|---|---|---|---|
| Santos de Guápiles (Costa Rica) | 3–4 | (Canada) **Forge FC** | 3–1 | 0–3 |

===== Semi-finals =====
| Team 1 | Agg. | Team 2 | 1st leg | 2nd leg |
|---|---|---|---|---|
| Forge FC (Canada) | 2–2 (a) | (Honduras) **Motagua** | 2–2 | 0–0 |

==== Leagues Cup ====
No Canadian teams qualified for the Leagues Cup.

==== Campeones Cup ====
No Canadian teams qualified for the Campeones Cup.
