= 2022 FIFA World Cup qualification – CONCACAF third round =

International football competition

Tournament details
- Dates: 2 September 2021 – 30 March 2022
- Teams: 8 (from 1 confederation)

Tournament statistics
- Matches played: 56
- Goals scored: 118 (2.11 per match)
- Top scorer: (Canada) Cyle Larin (6 goals)

The third round of CONCACAF matches for 2022 FIFA World Cup qualification, nicknamed the Octagonal (for the eight teams participating), was played from September 2021 to March 2022. Canada (qualifying for the first time since 1986), Mexico, and the United States qualified for the 2022 FIFA World Cup, while Costa Rica advanced to the inter-confederation play-offs. Panama, Jamaica, El Salvador, and Honduras were eliminated in this round.

The match on 16 November 2021 between Canada and Mexico, held in Edmonton, marked the coldest match played in Mexican football history, kicking off at −9 °C (16 °F) with a heavy snowstorm the day before. The match was seen by 2.1 million viewers in the United States on the day of its original broadcast, becoming Telemundo's most-watched sporting event since the 2019 Copa América final.

== Format ==
Eight teams (CONCACAF teams ranked 1 to 5 based on the FIFA rankings of July 2020, and the three winners of the second round) played against each other home-and-away in a round-robin format for a total of 14 matches per team. The top three teams qualified for the 2022 FIFA World Cup in Qatar, while the fourth-placed team advanced to the inter-confederation play-offs to get one of the last 2 places in the tournament.

== Schedule ==
The third round was originally scheduled to begin in June 2021, but was postponed by the COVID-19 pandemic. The full schedule for the third round was announced on 16 June 2021, and confirmed on 9 August 2021.

Matchday	Dates	Matches	Original dates
Matchday 1	2 September 2021	1 v 2, 3 v 4, 5 v 6, 7 v 8	June 2021
Matchday 2	5 September 2021	4 v 1, 3 v 2, 6 v 7, 8 v 5	June 2021
Matchday 3	8 September 2021	1 v 3, 2 v 4, 5 v 7, 6 v 8	June 2021
Matchday 4	7 October 2021	7 v 1, 2 v 6, 3 v 5, 4 v 8	June 2021
Matchday 5	10 October 2021	8 v 1, 7 v 2, 6 v 3, 5 v 4	September 2021
Matchday 6	13 October 2021	1 v 5, 2 v 8, 3 v 7, 4 v 6	September 2021
Matchday 7	12 November 2021	1 v 6, 2 v 5, 3 v 8, 4 v 7	October 2021
Matchday 8	16 November 2021	1 v 7, 6 v 2, 5 v 3, 8 v 4	October 2021
Matchday 9	27 January 2022	2 v 1, 4 v 3, 6 v 5, 8 v 7	November 2021
Matchday 10	30 January 2022	1 v 4, 2 v 3, 7 v 6, 5 v 8	November 2021
Matchday 11	2 February 2022	3 v 1, 4 v 2, 7 v 5, 8 v 6	January 2022
Matchday 12	24 March 2022	6 v 1, 5 v 2, 8 v 3, 7 v 4	January 2022
Matchday 13	27 March 2022	1 v 8, 2 v 7, 3 v 6, 4 v 5	March 2022
Matchday 14	30 March 2022	5 v 1, 8 v 2, 7 v 3, 6 v 4	March 2022

== Qualified teams ==
The top five teams based on the FIFA rankings of July 2020 (shown in parentheses) received a bye to the third round. For consistency, the three winners of the second round are shown with their FIFA rankings as of July 2020.

Bye to third round	Second round winners
1. Mexico (11); 2. United States (22); 3. Costa Rica (46); 4. Jamaica (48); 5. Honduras (62)	6. El Salvador (69); 7. Canada (73); 8. Panama (81)

== Draw ==
The draw for the third round was held, along with the draw for the first round, on 19 August 2020, 19:00 CEST (UTC+2), at the FIFA headquarters in Zürich, Switzerland.

Teams were drawn from a single pot, and then were allocated a position (from 1 to 8) to determine the match schedule. The identity of the three second round winners was not known at the time of the draw.

Note: Bolded teams qualified for the World Cup. Costa Rica advanced to the inter-confederation play-offs.

Draw position	Team
1	**Canada** (Note: Identity of the team unknown at the time of the draw.)
2	Honduras
3	El Salvador
4	**United States**
5	Panama
6	Costa Rica
7	**Mexico**
8	Jamaica

== Standings ==
Pos	Team	Pld	W	D	L	GF	GA	GD	Pts	Qualification	Canada	Mexico	United States	Costa Rica	Panama	Jamaica	El Salvador	Honduras
1	Canada	14	8	4	2	23	7	+16	28	2022 FIFA World Cup	—	2–1	2–0	1–0	4–1	4–0	3–0	1–1
2	Mexico	14	8	4	2	17	8	+9	28	2022 FIFA World Cup	1–1	—	0–0	0–0	1–0	2–1	2–0	3–0
3	United States	14	7	4	3	21	10	+11	25	2022 FIFA World Cup	1–1	2–0	—	2–1	5–1	2–0	1–0	3–0
4	Costa Rica	14	7	4	3	13	8	+5	25	Inter-confederation play-offs	1–0	0–1	2–0	—	1–0	1–1	2–1	2–1
5	Panama	14	6	3	5	17	19	−2	21		1–0	1–1	1–0	0–0	—	3–2	2–1	1–1
6	Jamaica	14	2	5	7	12	22	−10	11		0–0	1–2	1–1	0–1	0–3	—	1–1	2–1
7	El Salvador	14	2	4	8	8	18	−10	10		0–2	0–2	0–0	1–2	1–0	1–1	—	0–0
8	Honduras	14	0	4	10	7	26	−19	4		0–2	0–1	1–4	0–0	2–3	0–2	0–2	—

Source: FIFA, CONCACAF
Rules for classification: Tiebreakers

== Matches ==
=== Matchday 1 ===
2 September 2021
20:05 UTC−4

Canada	1–1	Honduras
Larin 66' (pen.)	Report (FIFA); Report (CONCACAF)	A. López 40' (pen.)

BMO Field, Toronto
Attendance: 14,822
Referee: Fernando Guerrero (Mexico)

2 September 2021
20:05 UTC−5

Panama	0–0	Costa Rica
	Report (FIFA); Report (CONCACAF)

Estadio Rommel Fernández, Panama City
Attendance: 14,000
Referee: Iván Barton (El Salvador)

2 September 2021
21:00 UTC−5

Mexico	2–1	Jamaica
Vega 50'; Martín 89'	Report (FIFA); Report (CONCACAF)	Nicholson 65'

Estadio Azteca, Mexico City
Attendance: 0
Referee: Selvin Brown (Honduras)

2 September 2021
20:05 UTC−6

El Salvador	0–0	United States
	Report (FIFA); Report (CONCACAF)

Estadio Cuscatlán, San Salvador
Attendance: 29,000
Referee: Juan Gabriel Calderón (Costa Rica)

=== Matchday 2 ===
5 September 2021
17:00 UTC−5

Jamaica	0–3	Panama
	Report (FIFA); Report (CONCACAF)	Andrade 14'; Blackburn 39'; Waterman 82'

National Stadium, Kingston
Attendance: 0
Referee: Ismael Cornejo (El Salvador)

5 September 2021
17:00 UTC−6

El Salvador	0–0	Honduras
	Report (FIFA); Report (CONCACAF)

Estadio Cuscatlán, San Salvador
Attendance: 29,000
Referee: Walter López (Guatemala)

5 September 2021
17:00 UTC−6

Costa Rica	0–1	Mexico
	Report (FIFA); Report (CONCACAF)	Pineda 45+1' (pen.)

Estadio Nacional, San José
Attendance: 3,000
Referee: Ismail Elfath (United States)

5 September 2021
19:00 UTC−5

United States	1–1	Canada
Aaronson 55'	Report (FIFA); Report (CONCACAF)	Larin 62'

Nissan Stadium, Nashville
Attendance: 43,028
Referee: Oshane Nation (Jamaica)

=== Matchday 3 ===
8 September 2021
19:30 UTC−4

Canada	3–0	El Salvador
Hutchinson 6'; David 11'; Buchanan 59'	Report (FIFA); Report (CONCACAF)

BMO Field, Toronto
Attendance: 15,000
Referee: Ricardo Montero (Costa Rica)

8 September 2021
19:05 UTC−5 (Note: The Panama v Mexico match was originally scheduled on 8 September 2021, 20:05 local time, but was re-scheduled to 19:05 local time since Panama maintained a midnight curfew as a preventive measure against the COVID-19 pandemic.)

Panama	1–1	Mexico
Blackburn 28'	Report (FIFA); Report (CONCACAF)	Corona 76'

Estadio Rommel Fernández, Panama City
Attendance: 16,000
Referee: Mario Escobar (Guatemala)

8 September 2021
19:00 UTC−6

Costa Rica	1–1	Jamaica
Marín 3'	Report (FIFA); Report (CONCACAF)	Nicholson 47'

Estadio Nacional, San José
Attendance: 3,000
Referee: Drew Fischer (Canada)

8 September 2021
20:30 UTC−6

Honduras	1–4	United States
Moya 27'	Report (FIFA); Report (CONCACAF)	A. Robinson 48'; Pepi 75'; Aaronson 86'; Lletget 90+3'

Estadio Olímpico Metropolitano, San Pedro Sula
Attendance: 31,000
Referee: Fernando Hernández (Mexico)

=== Matchday 4 ===
7 October 2021
18:30 UTC−5

United States	2–0	Jamaica
Pepi 49', 62'	Report (FIFA); Report (CONCACAF)

Q2 Stadium, Austin
Attendance: 20,500
Referee: Reon Radix (Grenada)

7 October 2021
18:05 UTC−6

Honduras	0–0	Costa Rica
	Report (FIFA); Report (CONCACAF)

Estadio Olímpico Metropolitano, San Pedro Sula
Attendance: 19,000
Referee: Mario Escobar (Guatemala)

7 October 2021
20:40 UTC−5

Mexico	1–1	Canada
Sánchez 21'	Report (FIFA); Report (CONCACAF)	Osorio 42'

Estadio Azteca, Mexico City
Attendance: 61,200
Referee: Ismael Cornejo (El Salvador)

7 October 2021
20:05 UTC−6

El Salvador	1–0	Panama
Hernández 37'	Report (FIFA); Report (CONCACAF)

Estadio Cuscatlán, San Salvador
Attendance: 10,000
Referee: Oshane Nation (Jamaica)

=== Matchday 5 ===
10 October 2021
17:00 UTC−5

Jamaica	0–0	Canada
	Report (FIFA); Report (CONCACAF)

National Stadium, Kingston
Attendance: 0
Referee: Keylor Herrera (Costa Rica)

10 October 2021
16:00 UTC−6

Costa Rica	2–1	El Salvador
Ruiz 52'; Borges 58' (pen.)	Report (FIFA); Report (CONCACAF)	Henríquez 12'

Estadio Nacional, San José
Attendance: 5,000
Referee: Saíd Martínez (Honduras)

10 October 2021
17:00 UTC−5

Panama	1–0	United States
Godoy 54'	Report (FIFA); Report (CONCACAF)

Estadio Rommel Fernández, Panama City
Attendance: 21,000
Referee: César Ramos (Mexico)

10 October 2021
18:00 UTC−5

Mexico	3–0	Honduras
Córdova 18'; Funes Mori 76'; Lozano 86'	Report (FIFA); Report (CONCACAF)

Estadio Azteca, Mexico City
Attendance: 70,000
Referee: Ismail Elfath (United States)

=== Matchday 6 ===
13 October 2021
19:00 UTC−4

United States	2–1	Costa Rica
Dest 25'; Moreira 66' (o.g.)	Report (FIFA); Report (CONCACAF)	Fuller 1'

Lower.com Field, Columbus
Attendance: 20,165
Referee: Daneon Parchment (Jamaica)

13 October 2021
19:30 UTC−4

Canada	4–1	Panama
Murillo 28' (o.g.); Davies 66'; Buchanan 71'; David 78'	Report (FIFA); Report (CONCACAF)	Blackburn 5'

BMO Field, Toronto
Attendance: 26,622
Referee: Armando Villarreal (United States)

13 October 2021
18:05 UTC−6

Honduras	0–2	Jamaica
	Report (FIFA); Report (CONCACAF)	Roofe 38'; Fisher 79'

Estadio Olímpico Metropolitano, San Pedro Sula
Attendance: 18,000
Referee: Bryan López (Guatemala)

13 October 2021
20:05 UTC−6

El Salvador	0–2	Mexico
	Report (FIFA); Report (CONCACAF)	Moreno 30'; Jiménez 90+3' (pen.)

Estadio Cuscatlán, San Salvador
Attendance: 31,000
Referee: Drew Fischer (Canada)

=== Matchday 7 ===
12 November 2021
19:05 UTC−6

Honduras	2–3	Panama
Elis 30'; Moya 59'	Report (FIFA); Report (CONCACAF)	Waterman 77'; Yanis 81'; Davis 85'

Estadio Olímpico Metropolitano, San Pedro Sula
Attendance: 10,000
Referee: Drew Fischer (Canada)

12 November 2021
20:00 UTC−6

El Salvador	1–1	Jamaica
Roldan 90'	Report (FIFA); Report (CONCACAF)	Antonio 82'

Estadio Cuscatlán, San Salvador
Attendance: 10,000
Referee: José Torres (Puerto Rico)

12 November 2021
19:05 UTC−7

Canada	1–0	Costa Rica
David 57'	Report (FIFA); Report (CONCACAF)

Commonwealth Stadium, Edmonton
Attendance: 48,806
Referee: Ismail Elfath (United States)

12 November 2021
21:10 UTC−5

United States	2–0	Mexico
Pulisic 74'; McKennie 85'	Report (FIFA); Report (CONCACAF)

TQL Stadium, Cincinnati
Attendance: 26,000
Referee: Iván Barton (El Salvador)

=== Matchday 8 ===
16 November 2021
17:00 UTC−5

Jamaica	1–1	United States
Antonio 22'	Report (FIFA); Report (CONCACAF)	Weah 11'

National Stadium, Kingston
Attendance: 4,100
Referee: Juan Gabriel Calderón (Costa Rica)

16 November 2021
19:05 UTC−6

Costa Rica	2–1	Honduras
Duarte 20'; Torres 90+5'	Report (FIFA); Report (CONCACAF)	Quioto 35'

Estadio Nacional, San José
Attendance: 5,000
Referee: Jair Marrufo (United States)

16 November 2021
20:05 UTC−5

Panama	2–1	El Salvador
Waterman 50'; Góndola 52'	Report (FIFA); Report (CONCACAF)	Henríquez 1'

Estadio Rommel Fernández, Panama City
Attendance: 15,000
Referee: Marco Ortíz (Mexico)

16 November 2021
19:05 UTC−7

Canada	2–1	Mexico
Larin 45+2', 52'	Report (FIFA); Report (CONCACAF)	Herrera 90'

Commonwealth Stadium, Edmonton
Attendance: 44,212
Referee: Mario Escobar (Guatemala)

=== Matchday 9 ===
27 January 2022
19:00 UTC−5

United States	1–0	El Salvador
A. Robinson 52'	Report (FIFA); Report (CONCACAF)

Lower.com Field, Columbus
Attendance: 20,000
Referee: Bryan López (Guatemala)

27 January 2022
19:00 UTC−5

Jamaica	1–2	Mexico
Johnson 50'	Report (FIFA); Report (CONCACAF)	Martín 82'; Vega 83'

National Stadium, Kingston
Attendance: 0
Referee: Ismael Cornejo (El Salvador)

27 January 2022
19:05 UTC−6

Honduras	0–2	Canada
	Report (FIFA); Report (CONCACAF)	Maldonado 10' (o.g.); David 73'

Estadio Olímpico Metropolitano, San Pedro Sula
Attendance: 10,000
Referee: Daneon Parchment (Jamaica)

27 January 2022
20:05 UTC−6

Costa Rica	1–0	Panama
Ruiz 65'	Report (FIFA); Report (CONCACAF)

Estadio Nacional, San José
Attendance: 21,000
Referee: Ismail Elfath (United States)

=== Matchday 10 ===
30 January 2022
15:05 UTC−5

Canada	2–0	United States
Larin 7'; Adekugbe 90+5'	Report (FIFA); Report (CONCACAF)

Tim Hortons Field, Hamilton
Attendance: 12,000
Referee: César Ramos (Mexico)

30 January 2022
17:05 UTC−5

Panama	3–2	Jamaica
Brown 43' (o.g.); Davis 51'; Ariano 69'	Report (FIFA); Report (CONCACAF)	Antonio 5' (pen.); Gray 87'

Estadio Rommel Fernández, Panama City
Attendance: 0
Referee: Selvin Brown (Honduras)

30 January 2022
17:00 UTC−6

Mexico	0–0	Costa Rica
	Report (FIFA); Report (CONCACAF)

Estadio Azteca, Mexico City
Attendance: 2,000
Referee: Saíd Martínez (Honduras)

30 January 2022
18:05 UTC−6

Honduras	0–2	El Salvador
	Report (FIFA); Report (CONCACAF)	Bonilla 35'; Cerén 90+2'

Estadio Olímpico Metropolitano, San Pedro Sula
Attendance: 3,000
Referee: Keylor Herrera (Costa Rica)

=== Matchday 11 ===
2 February 2022
19:00 UTC−5

Jamaica	0–1	Costa Rica
	Report (FIFA); Report (CONCACAF)	Campbell 62'

National Stadium, Kingston
Attendance: 0
Referee: Marco Ortíz (Mexico) (Note: Referee Jair Marrufo from United States, who was originally assigned to the Jamaica v Costa Rica match, was replaced by Marco Ortíz from Mexico.)

2 February 2022
18:30 UTC−6

United States	3–0	Honduras
McKennie 8'; Zimmerman 37'; Pulisic 67'	Report (FIFA); Report (CONCACAF)

Allianz Field, Saint Paul
Attendance: 19,202
Referee: Oshane Nation (Jamaica)

2 February 2022
20:00 UTC−6

El Salvador	0–2	Canada
	Report (FIFA); Report (CONCACAF)	Hutchinson 66'; David 90+3'

Estadio Cuscatlán, San Salvador
Attendance: 9,000
Referee: Armando Villarreal (United States)

2 February 2022
21:00 UTC−6

Mexico	1–0	Panama
Jiménez 80' (pen.)	Report (FIFA); Report (CONCACAF)

Estadio Azteca, Mexico City
Attendance: 2,000
Referee: Iván Barton (El Salvador)

=== Matchday 12 ===
24 March 2022
18:05 UTC−5 (Note: The Jamaica v El Salvador match was originally scheduled on 24 September 2021, 19:00 local time, but was rescheduled to 18:05 local time.)

Jamaica	1–1	El Salvador
Gray 72'	Report (FIFA); Report (CONCACAF)	Zavaleta 21'

National Stadium, Kingston
Attendance: 2,000
Referee: Fernando Hernández (Mexico)

24 March 2022
20:05 UTC−5

Panama	1–1	Honduras
Blackburn 23'	Report (FIFA); Report (CONCACAF)	K. López 65'

Estadio Rommel Fernández, Panama City
Attendance: 24,000
Referee: Ismail Elfath (United States)

24 March 2022
20:00 UTC−6

Mexico	0–0	United States
	Report (FIFA); Report (CONCACAF)

Estadio Azteca, Mexico City
Attendance: 47,000
Referee: Mario Escobar (Guatemala)

24 March 2022
20:05 UTC−6

Costa Rica	1–0	Canada
Borges 45+1'	Report (FIFA); Report (CONCACAF)

Estadio Nacional, San José
Attendance: 34,000
Referee: Saíd Martínez (Honduras)

=== Matchday 13 ===
27 March 2022
16:05 UTC−4

Canada	4–0	Jamaica
Larin 13'; Buchanan 44'; Hoilett 83'; Mariappa 88' (o.g.)	Report (FIFA); Report (CONCACAF)

BMO Field, Toronto
Attendance: 29,122
Referee: Fernando Guerrero (Mexico)

27 March 2022
15:05 UTC−6

El Salvador	1–2	Costa Rica
Gil 31'	Report (FIFA); Report (CONCACAF)	Contreras 30'; Campbell 45+1'

Estadio Cuscatlán, San Salvador
Attendance: 6,000
Referee: Daneon Parchment (Jamaica)

27 March 2022
19:00 UTC−4

United States	5–1	Panama
Pulisic 17' (pen.), 45+4' (pen.), 65'; Arriola 23'; Ferreira 27'	Report (FIFA); Report (CONCACAF)	Godoy 86'

Exploria Stadium, Orlando
Attendance: 25,022
Referee: Iván Barton (El Salvador)

27 March 2022
17:05 UTC−6

Honduras	0–1	Mexico
	Report (FIFA); Report (CONCACAF)	Álvarez 70'

Estadio Olímpico Metropolitano, San Pedro Sula
Attendance: 0
Referee: Armando Villarreal (United States)

=== Matchday 14 ===
30 March 2022
20:05 UTC−5

Panama	1–0	Canada
Torres 49'	Report (FIFA); Report (CONCACAF)

Estadio Rommel Fernández, Panama City
Attendance: 8,000
Referee: Jair Marrufo (United States)

30 March 2022
20:05 UTC−5

Jamaica	2–1	Honduras
Bailey 39' (pen.); Morrison 45+2'	Report (FIFA); Report (CONCACAF)	Tejeda 18' (pen.)

National Stadium, Kingston
Attendance: 2,500
Referee: Keylor Herrera (Costa Rica)

30 March 2022
19:05 UTC−6

Mexico	2–0	El Salvador
Antuna 17'; Jiménez 43' (pen.)	Report (FIFA); Report (CONCACAF)

Estadio Azteca, Mexico City
Attendance: 65,200
Referee: Oshane Nation (Jamaica)

30 March 2022
19:05 UTC−6

Costa Rica	2–0	United States
Vargas 51'; Contreras 59'	Report (FIFA); Report (CONCACAF)

Estadio Nacional, San José
Attendance: 35,000
Referee: Drew Fischer (Canada)

== Statistics ==
=== Goalscorers ===
There were 118 goals scored in 56 matches, for an average of 2.11 goals per match.

6 goals

- (Canada men's national soccer team) Cyle Larin

5 goals

- (Canada men's national soccer team) Jonathan David
- (United States men's national soccer team) Christian Pulisic

4 goals

- (Panama national football team) Rolando Blackburn

3 goals

- (Canada men's national soccer team) Tajon Buchanan
- (Jamaica national football team) Michail Antonio
- (Mexico national football team) Raúl Jiménez
- (Panama national football team) Cecilio Waterman
- (United States men's national soccer team) Ricardo Pepi

2 goals

- (Canada men's national soccer team) Atiba Hutchinson
- (Costa Rica national football team) Celso Borges
- (Costa Rica national football team) Joel Campbell
- (Costa Rica national football team) Anthony Contreras
- (Costa Rica national football team) Bryan Ruiz
- (El Salvador national football team) Jairo Henríquez
- (Honduras national football team) Brayan Moya
- (Jamaica national football team) Andre Gray
- (Jamaica national football team) Shamar Nicholson
- (Mexico national football team) Henry Martín
- (Mexico national football team) Alexis Vega
- (Panama national football team) Eric Davis
- (Panama national football team) Aníbal Godoy
- (United States men's national soccer team) Brenden Aaronson
- (United States men's national soccer team) Weston McKennie
- (United States men's national soccer team) Antonee Robinson

1 goal

- (Canada men's national soccer team) Sam Adekugbe
- (Canada men's national soccer team) Alphonso Davies
- (Canada men's national soccer team) Junior Hoilett
- (Canada men's national soccer team) Jonathan Osorio
- (Costa Rica national football team) Óscar Duarte
- (Costa Rica national football team) Keysher Fuller
- (Costa Rica national football team) Jimmy Marín
- (Costa Rica national football team) Gerson Torres
- (Costa Rica national football team) Juan Pablo Vargas
- (El Salvador national football team) Nelson Bonilla
- (El Salvador national football team) Darwin Cerén
- (El Salvador national football team) Cristian Gil
- (El Salvador national football team) Enrico Hernández
- (El Salvador national football team) Alex Roldan
- (El Salvador national football team) Eriq Zavaleta
- (Honduras national football team) Alberth Elis
- (Honduras national football team) Alexander López
- (Honduras national football team) Kevin López
- (Honduras national football team) Romell Quioto
- (Honduras national football team) Ángel Tejeda
- (Jamaica national football team) Leon Bailey
- (Jamaica national football team) Oniel Fisher
- (Jamaica national football team) Daniel Johnson
- (Jamaica national football team) Ravel Morrison
- (Jamaica national football team) Kemar Roofe
- (Mexico national football team) Edson Álvarez
- (Mexico national football team) Uriel Antuna
- (Mexico national football team) Sebastián Córdova
- (Mexico national football team) Jesús Corona
- (Mexico national football team) Rogelio Funes Mori
- (Mexico national football team) Héctor Herrera
- (Mexico national football team) Hirving Lozano
- (Mexico national football team) Héctor Moreno
- (Mexico national football team) Orbelín Pineda
- (Mexico national football team) Jorge Sánchez
- (Panama national football team) Andrés Andrade
- (Panama national football team) Azmahar Ariano
- (Panama national football team) Freddy Góndola
- (Panama national football team) Gabriel Torres
- (Panama national football team) César Yanis
- (United States men's national soccer team) Paul Arriola
- (United States men's national soccer team) Sergiño Dest
- (United States men's national soccer team) Jesús Ferreira
- (United States men's national soccer team) Sebastian Lletget
- (United States men's national soccer team) Timothy Weah
- (United States men's national soccer team) Walker Zimmerman

1 own goal

- (Costa Rica national football team) Leonel Moreira (against United States)
- (Honduras national football team) Denil Maldonado (against Canada)
- (Jamaica national football team) Javain Brown (against Panama)
- (Jamaica national football team) Adrian Mariappa (against Canada)
- (Panama national football team) Michael Amir Murillo (against Canada)

=== Awards ===
Best XI

CONCACAF announced the following squad as the best eleven of the third round of qualifying after the conclusion of the campaign.

Goalkeeper	Defenders	Midfielders	Forwards
(Costa Rica) Keylor Navas	(Mexico) César Montes (Costa Rica) Francisco Calvo (United States) Walker Zimmerman	(United States) Christian Pulisic (Mexico) Edson Álvarez (Canada) Stephen Eustáquio (Mexico) Héctor Herrera	(Costa Rica) Joel Campbell (Canada) Cyle Larin (Canada) Jonathan David
