= 2022 FIFA World Cup qualification – CONCACAF second round =

2022 FIFA World Cup Qualification - CONCACAF second round
Tournament details
- Dates: 12 and 15 June 2021
- Teams: 6 (from 1 confederation)

Tournament statistics
- Matches played: 6
- Goals scored: 13 (2.17 per match)
- Top scorer(s): (Canada) Cyle Larin (El Salvador) Joshua Pérez (El Salvador) David Rugamas (2 goals each)

The second round of CONCACAF matches for 2022 FIFA World Cup qualification was played on 12 and 15 June 2021.

== Format ==
A total of six teams advanced from the first round and played home-and-away over two legs in three ties. The three winners advanced to the third round.

== Schedule ==
The first and second legs were originally scheduled for March 2021, but were later rescheduled to June 2021 due to the COVID-19 pandemic.

== Qualified teams ==
Note: Bolded teams qualified for the third round.

Group (first round)	Winners
A	**El Salvador**
B	**Canada**
C	Curaçao
D	**Panama**
E	Haiti
F	Saint Kitts and Nevis

The second round ties were predetermined as follows:

- Group A winner v Group F winner
- Group B winner v Group E winner
- Group C winner v Group D winner

The winners of Groups D–F hosted the first leg, while the winners of Groups A–C hosted the second leg.

== Summary ==
The matches were played on 12 and 15 June 2021.

Team 1	Agg.	Team 2	1st leg	2nd leg
Saint Kitts and Nevis	0–6	**El Salvador**	0–4	0–2
Haiti	0–4	**Canada**	0–1	0–3
**Panama**	2–1	Curaçao	2–1	0–0

== Matches ==
12 June 2021
16:00 UTC−4

Saint Kitts and Nevis	0–4	El Salvador
	Report	Rugamas 3', 27'; Pérez 20'; Cerén 64' (pen.)

Warner Park, Basseterre
Attendance: 0
Referee: Kevin Morrison (Jamaica)
15 June 2021
19:30 UTC−6

El Salvador	2–0	Saint Kitts and Nevis
Pérez 24'; Mayen 87'	Report

Estadio Cuscatlán, San Salvador
Attendance: 0
Referee: Keylor Herrera (Costa Rica)

El Salvador won 6–0 on aggregate and advanced to the third round.

12 June 2021
17:00 UTC−4

Haiti	0–1	Canada
	Report	Larin 14'

Stade Sylvio Cator, Port-au-Prince
Attendance: 0
Referee: John Pitti (Panama)
15 June 2021
20:05 UTC−5

Canada	3–0	Haiti
Duverger 46' (o.g.); Larin 74'; Hoilett 89'	Report

SeatGeek Stadium, Bridgeview (United States)
Attendance: 0
Referee: Rubiel Vazquez (United States)

Canada won 4–0 on aggregate and advanced to the third round.

12 June 2021
18:15 UTC−5

Panama	2–1	Curaçao
Quintero 55'; Waterman 77'	Report	Janga 87'

Estadio Nacional Rod Carew, Panama City
Attendance: 7,000
Referee: Jaime Herrera (El Salvador)
15 June 2021
19:00 UTC−4

Curaçao	0–0	Panama
	Report

Ergilio Hato Stadium, Willemstad
Attendance: 2,760
Referee: Marco Ortíz (Mexico)

Panama won 2–1 on aggregate and advanced to the third round.

== Goalscorers ==
There were 13 goals scored in 6 matches, for an average of 2.17 goals per match.

2 goals

- (Canada men's national soccer team) Cyle Larin
- (El Salvador national football team) Joshua Pérez
- (El Salvador national football team) David Rugamas

1 goal

- (Canada men's national soccer team) Junior Hoilett
- (Curaçao national football team) Rangelo Janga
- (El Salvador national football team) Darwin Cerén
- (El Salvador national football team) Gerson Mayen
- (Panama national football team) Alberto Quintero
- (Panama national football team) Cecilio Waterman

1 own goal

- (Haiti national football team) Josué Duverger (against Canada)
