= Canada v Mexico (2022 FIFA World Cup qualification) =

Canada 2–1 Mexico (2021)
Battle of the "Iceteca"
- Event: 2022 FIFA World Cup qualification
Canada	Mexico
2	1
- Date: November 16, 2021
- Venue: Commonwealth Stadium, Edmonton, Alberta
- Referee: Mario Escobar (Guatemala)
- Attendance: 44,212
- Weather: Snow −9 °C (16 °F)

The 2022 FIFA World Cup qualifying match between Canada and Mexico was an association football match contested by the Canadian and Mexican men's national soccer teams during the third round of CONCACAF's 2022 FIFA World Cup qualification tournament. Canada's victory over Mexico ended Mexico's eleven match unbeaten streak against Canada dating back to August 15, 2000, and put Canada in first place of the qualifying group. The temperature at kickoff was recorded as −9 °C (16 °F), making it the coldest match ever played by the Mexico national team.

== Pre-match ==
=== Venue selection ===
Canada was scheduled to be the home team for the seventh and eighth fixtures of the qualifying group, and the Canadian Soccer Association chose to host their matches in Edmonton, Alberta, a city renowned for very cold Prairie winters. This strategy was often used by both Canada and the United States to create a disadvantage for the Mexican team, as those players would not be used to playing under such frigid conditions. These cold conditions caused Canadian fans and eventually Canada Soccer to nickname Commonwealth Stadium in Edmonton as the "Iceteca" or "Estadio Iceteca" which was a play on words of the Estadio Azteca, Mexico's home stadium. Several fans would later refer to the match as the Battle of the "Iceteca".

=== Background ===
Canada and Mexico had faced each other twice before in 2021. Mexico was able to beat Canada 2–1 in the 2021 CONCACAF Gold Cup semi-finals, defeating them with a winning goal in the 90+9th minute of the match scored by Héctor Herrera. Mexico had also hosted Canada earlier in October for a World Cup qualifying match which ended in a 1–1 draw at the Estadio Azteca. Mexico were in second place of the group, tied with first place U.S. with fourteen points, while Canada trailed by one point in third place. Both teams had the opportunity to rise to the top of the group if they could come away with a win.

Table as of November 12, 2021
Pos	Team	Pld	W	D	L	GF	GA	GD	Pts	Qualification
1	United States	7	4	2	1	11	4	+7	14	Qualification for 2022 FIFA World Cup
2	Mexico	7	4	2	1	10	5	+5	14	Qualification for 2022 FIFA World Cup
3	Canada	7	3	4	0	11	4	+7	13	Qualification for 2022 FIFA World Cup
4	Panama	7	3	2	2	9	8	+1	11	Advance to inter-confederation play-offs
5	Costa Rica	7	1	3	3	4	6	−2	6	
6	Jamaica	7	1	3	3	5	9	−4	6	
7	El Salvador	7	1	3	3	3	8	−5	6	
8	Honduras	7	0	3	4	4	13	−9	3	

Updated to match(es) played on November 12, 2021. Source: FIFA, CONCACAF
Rules for classification: Tiebreakers

== Match ==
=== Summary ===
==== First half ====
The first half quickly became a hostile affair, with both sides carrying over the bitterness from the recent fixtures. A particularly hard challenge in the first couple minutes of play left Mexican forward Hirving Lozano down for several minutes as the foul count continued to grow. As tensions rose, both managers were cautioned after half an hour for complaints towards the referees and each other. Canada were able to find the opening goal in first-half stoppage time after Cyle Larin was able to tap in a rebound after goalkeeper Guillermo Ochoa mistakenly fumbled the ball from a long shot by Alistair Johnston.

==== Second half ====
Seven minutes into the second half, Canada would double their lead when Mexico failed to defend a Stephen Eustáquio free kick which landed in the goal area for Larin to tap in. During the goal celebration, Canadian defender Sam Adekugbe made headlines after celebrating in true Canadian fashion by jumping into a snow bank which had developed near the corner of the pitch. This goal was Larin's twenty-second goal for the Canada men's national team, and equalled the team's top scoring record held by Dwayne De Rosario. Both sides continued to get stuck in and frustrations started to boil over near the end as Mexico desperately attempted to find equalizing goals. Mexico would eventually find the net in the ninetieth minute of play, when Hector Herrera was able to head in a cross from the right and half the deficit. This was quickly followed by a skirmish in front of goal as Mexican players attempted to swipe the ball from goalkeeper Milan Borjan, whom had immediately pounced on the ball to delay the restart as the match entered stoppage time. With increased motivation to equalize, Mexico unleashed several promising attacks throughout additional time, most notably in the third additional minute when the Canadian defence failed to clear away a cross and gave away a shot from two yards out. However, Borjan was able to make a goal line save, prompting several protests from Mexican players who believed the ball was over the line. Canada attempted to kill the last couple seconds of the game by holding the ball in the corner, causing an angered Néstor Araujo to recklessly shoulder charge Lucas Cavallini from behind. The referee issued a yellow card for the challenge before ending the match.

=== Details ===
November 16, 2021
19:05 MT (UTC−07:00)

Canada	2–1	Mexico
Larin 45+2', 52'	Report (FIFA); Report (CONCACAF)	Herrera 90'

Commonwealth Stadium, Edmonton
Attendance: 44,212
Referee: Mario Escobar (Guatemala)

Canada	Mexico

GK	18	Milan Borjan
RB	2	Alistair Johnston
CB	4	Kamal Miller
CB	15	Doneil Henry	(yellow card) 13'	(substituted off) 37'
LB	3	Sam Adekugbe
DM	13	Atiba Hutchinson (c)
RM	22	Richie Laryea
CM	7	Stephen Eustáquio
LM	19	Alphonso Davies		(substituted off) 88'
SS	11	Tajon Buchanan
CF	17	Cyle Larin		(substituted off) 72'
Substitutes:
GK	1	James Pantemis
GK	16	Maxime Crépeau
DF	5	Steven Vitória		(substituted on) 37'
DF	23	Derek Cornelius
MF	6	Samuel Piette
MF	8	David Wotherspoon
MF	10	Jonathan Osorio		(substituted on) 88'
MF	14	Mark-Anthony Kaye
MF	21	Liam Millar
FW	9	Lucas Cavallini		(substituted on) 88'
FW	12	Iké Ugbo
FW	20	Jonathan David		(substituted on) 72' (substituted off) 88'
Manager:
(England) John Herdman			(yellow card) 32'

GK	13	Guillermo Ochoa (c)
CB	2	Néstor Araujo	(yellow card) 90+8'
CB	3	Julio Domínguez		(substituted off) 46'
CB	5	Johan Vásquez
RM	6	Jorge Sánchez
CM	10	Orbelín Pineda		(substituted off) 59'
CM	4	Edson Álvarez		(substituted off) 74'
CM	16	Héctor Herrera
LM	23	Jesús Gallardo
SS	22	Hirving Lozano	(yellow card) 14'
CF	9	Raúl Jiménez
Substitutes:
GK	1	Alfredo Talavera
GK	12	Rodolfo Cota
DF	15	Osvaldo Rodríguez
DF	21	Jesús Alberto Angulo
MF	7	Luis Romo
MF	8	Charly Rodríguez
MF	14	Sebastián Córdova		(substituted on) 59'
MF	18	Andrés Guardado		(substituted on) 74'
MF	20	Roberto Alvarado
FW	11	Rogelio Funes Mori
FW	17	Jesús Manuel Corona		(substituted on) 46'
FW	19	Henry Martín
Manager:
(Argentina) Gerardo Martino			(yellow card) 32'

Assistant referees:
Caleb Wales
William Andrés Arrieta
Fourth official:
Benjamín Pineda

=== Statistics ===
	Canada	Mexico
Goals	2	1
Shots	8	12
Shots on target	4	6
Possession	41%	59%
Fouls	16	21
Yellow cards (Note: Includes cautions for team officials)	2	3
Red cards	0	0

== Post-match ==
=== Standings ===
Table as of November 16, 2021
Pos	Team	Pld	W	D	L	GF	GA	GD	Pts	Qualification
1	Canada	8	4	4	0	13	5	+8	16	Qualification for 2022 FIFA World Cup
2	United States	8	4	3	1	12	5	+7	15	Qualification for 2022 FIFA World Cup
3	Mexico	8	4	2	2	11	7	+4	14	Qualification for 2022 FIFA World Cup
4	Panama	8	4	2	2	11	9	+2	14	Advance to inter-confederation play-offs
5	Costa Rica	8	2	3	3	6	7	−1	9	
6	Jamaica	8	1	4	3	6	10	−4	7	
7	El Salvador	8	1	3	4	4	10	−6	6	
8	Honduras	8	0	3	5	5	15	−10	3	

Updated to match(es) played on November 16, 2021. Source: FIFA, CONCACAF
Rules for classification: Tiebreakers

=== Reactions ===
Canada's three points from the match would cause them to surpass the United States and take first place, a position that they would maintain for the rest of the tournament. In Canada, this match was seen by many as a turning point for Canadian soccer and the men's national team, whose normal reputation of being an underdog team in international competition with little prestige or potential, were now being proclaimed as the 'Kings of CONCACAF.' A staggering forty-four thousand fans turned up in sub-zero temperatures to watch the match, which in Edmonton was the national team's third highest attendance record, only sitting below the forty-eight thousand who showed for the match against Costa Rica four days earlier, and the fifty-two thousand people who attended a friendly against Brazil in 1994. Canada would eventually qualify for the FIFA World Cup for the first time since 1986. Despite the loss, Mexico would eventually reach second place and qualify as well for the seventeenth time in their history.

=== 2022 World Cup ===
Despite their successful qualifying campaign, Canada was only able to qualify for Pot 4 of the World Cup draw, and were placed in a challenging group with Belgium (the 2nd ranked country in the world), as well as Croatia and Morocco who would both eventually reach the semi-finals. Mexico despite qualifying for Pot 2 were also matched with difficult opposition in Poland, the eventual World Cup champions Argentina, and Saudi Arabia.

Canada were able to shock the world in their fourth ever World Cup match by putting up an incredible fight against Belgium, but were unable to find their first points at the World Cup due to a missed penalty-kick and poor finishing in an eventual 1–0 loss. Despite being praised by the international press, and the Belgian coaching staff, Canada would be defeated by Croatia and Morocco, and exited their second World Cup with two goals and no points.

Mexico's run was relatively unsuccessful as well. They managed to hold Poland to a 0–0 draw thanks to a penalty-save from Ochoa, however, their 2–0 loss to Argentina put them in a difficult position on the final matchday. Despite coming away with a win against Saudi Arabia, a 90+5th minute consolation goal for the Saudi Arabia national team eliminated Mexico on goal differential.

Canada		Round	Mexico	
Opponent	Result	Group stage	Opponent	Result
Belgium	0–1	Match 1	Poland	0–0
Croatia	1–4	Match 2	Argentina	0–2
Morocco	1–2	Match 3	Saudi Arabia	2–1
Group F 4th place: Pos / Team / Pld / Pts; 1 / Morocco / 3 / 7; 2 / Croatia / 3 / 5; 3 / Belgium / 3 / 4; 4 / Canada / 3 / 0; Source: FIFA		Final standings	Group C 3rd place: Pos / Team / Pld / Pts; 1 / Argentina / 3 / 6; 2 / Poland / 3 / 4; 3 / Mexico / 3 / 4; 4 / Saudi Arabia / 3 / 3; Source: FIFA	

== See also ==
- Snow Clasico
