= David Rugamas =

Salvadoran professional football player (born 1990)

Personal information
- Full name: David Antonio Rugamas Leiva
- Date of birth: 17 February 1990 (age 36)
- Place of birth: San Juan Opico, La Libertad, El Salvador
- Height: 1.71 m (5 ft 7 in)
- Position: Forward

Youth career
- 2008: Juventud Independiente (B)
- 2009–2010: Alianza FC (B)

Senior career*
Years	Team	Apps	(Gls)
2011	Alianza FC		
2012	Once Lobos		
2012	CD UES		
2013–2015	Juventud Independiente		(22)
2015–2017	AD Isidro Metapán		(21)
2016	→ Al-Mina'a (loan)		
2017–2018	CD Águila	25	(3)
2018–2019	CD FAS	10	(2)
2019	JL Chiangmai United	10	(3)
2020–2020	Xelajú MC	7	(1)
2020–2021	Once Deportivo	34	(15)
2021–	Águila	8	(2)

International career
2015–2021	El Salvador	17	(10)
- * Club domestic league appearances and goals

David Antonio Rugamas Leiva (born 17 February 1990) is a Salvadoran professional footballer who plays as a forward.

== Club career ==
=== Juventud Independiente ===
In 2013, Rugamas signed with Juventud Independiente.

=== Isidro Metapán ===
In 2015, he signed with A.D. Isidro Metapán.

=== Loan to Al-Mina'a ===
In August 2016, Rugamas was loan to Al-Mina'a.

=== Águila ===
Rugamas signed with Águila for the Apertura 2017. Rugamas left the club in July 2018.

=== FAS ===
Rugamas signed with FAS for the Apertura 2018. He scored a crucial goal in a 2–0 victory against Isidro Metapán, in the second leg of the quarter-finals of the Apertura 2018, in December 2018.

== Legal troubles ==
On the 15 May, 2024 Rugamas was arrested as part of team that defrauded a travel agency (Tropico Travel) [https://www.elsalvador.com/h-deportes/h-futbol/david-rugamas-detenido-estafas-agencias-de-viajes/1142793/2024/[

== International career ==
=== International goals ===
Scores and results list El Salvador's goal tally first.

No.	Date	Venue	Opponent	Score	Result	Competition
1.	7 March 2019	Banc of California Stadium, Los Angeles, United States	Guatemala	2–0	3–1	Friendly
2.	2 June 2019	Robert F. Kennedy Memorial Stadium, Washington, D.C., United States	Haiti	1–0	1–0	Friendly
3.	25 March 2021	Estadio Cuscatlán, San Salvador, El Salvador	Grenada	2–0	2–0	2022 FIFA World Cup qualification
4.	28 March 2021	Ergilio Hato Stadium, Willemstad, Curaçao	Montserrat	1–0	1–1	2022 FIFA World Cup qualification
5.	5 June 2021	Bethlehem Soccer Stadium, Upper Bethlehem, U.S. Virgin Islands	U.S. Virgin Islands	3–0	7–0	2022 FIFA World Cup qualification
6.	5 June 2021	Bethlehem Soccer Stadium, Upper Bethlehem, U.S. Virgin Islands	U.S. Virgin Islands	5–0	7–0	2022 FIFA World Cup qualification
7.	5 June 2021	Bethlehem Soccer Stadium, Upper Bethlehem, U.S. Virgin Islands	U.S. Virgin Islands	7–0	7–0	2022 FIFA World Cup qualification
8.	8 June 2021	Estadio Cuscatlán, San Salvador, El Salvador	Antigua and Barbuda	2–0	3–0	2022 FIFA World Cup qualification
9.	12 June 2021	Warner Park, Basseterre, Saint Kitts and Nevis	Saint Kitts and Nevis	1–0	4–0	2022 FIFA World Cup qualification
10.	12 June 2021	Warner Park, Basseterre, Saint Kitts and Nevis	Saint Kitts and Nevis	3–0	4–0	2022 FIFA World Cup qualification
