= 2022 FIFA World Cup qualification (CONCACAF) =

2022 sports qualifying tournament

Tournament details
- Dates: 24 March 2021 – 30 March 2022
- Teams: 34 (from 1 confederation)

Tournament statistics
- Matches played: 118
- Goals scored: 345 (2.92 per match)
- Attendance: 999,020 (8,466 per match)
- Top scorer(s): (Canada) Cyle Larin (13 goals)

The North, Central American and Caribbean section of the 2022 FIFA World Cup qualification acted as the qualifiers for the 2022 FIFA World Cup, held in Qatar, for national teams which were members of the Confederation of North, Central American and Caribbean Association Football (CONCACAF). Three direct slots and one inter-confederation play-off slot in the final tournament were available for CONCACAF teams.

== Format ==
=== Original format ===
On 10 July 2019, CONCACAF announced a restructured qualifying format for the World Cup. After CONCACAF initially announced in March 2018 that they would use the CONCACAF Ranking Index to determine the seeding of CONCACAF teams for qualifying to international tournaments, it was determined that FIFA Rankings would be used instead.

- Top-seeded Hexagonal group: The top 6 ranked CONCACAF teams based on the FIFA rankings of June 2020 were to play home-and-away round-robin matches in one single group (often referred to as the "Hexagonal"). The top three teams would have qualified for the World Cup, and the fourth-placed team would have advanced to the CONCACAF play-off round.
- Lower-seeded group stage and knockout stage: The remaining CONCACAF teams (ranked 7 to 35 based on the FIFA rankings of June 2020) were to be divided into eight groups (five groups of four teams and three groups of three teams) to play home-and-away round-robin matches. The winners of each group would have advanced to a knockout stage, consisting of the quarter-finals, semi-finals and final to be played in a two-legged home-and-away series. The winner of the knockout stage would have also advanced to the CONCACAF play-off round.
- Play-off round: The fourth-placed team of the Hexagonal group would have faced the winner of the knockout stage in order to advance to the inter-confederation play-offs.

Original qualifying schedule (pre-format change)
Stage	Matchday		FIFA international dates
Top-seeded round
Hexagonal	Matchday 1		31 August – 8 September 2020
Hexagonal	Matchday 2		31 August – 8 September 2020
Hexagonal	Matchday 3		5–13 October 2020
Hexagonal	Matchday 4		5–13 October 2020
Hexagonal	Matchday 5		9–17 November 2020
Hexagonal	Matchday 6		9–17 November 2020
Hexagonal	Matchday 7		22–30 March 2021
Hexagonal	Matchday 8		22–30 March 2021
Hexagonal	Matchday 9		30 August – 7 September 2021
Hexagonal	Matchday 10		30 August – 7 September 2021
Lower-seeded round
Group stage	Matchday 1		31 August – 8 September 2020
Group stage	Matchday 2		31 August – 8 September 2020
Group stage	Matchday 3		5–13 October 2020
Group stage	Matchday 4		5–13 October 2020
Group stage	Matchday 5		9–17 November 2020
Group stage	Matchday 6		9–17 November 2020
Knockout stage	Quarter-finals	First leg	22–30 March 2021
Knockout stage	Quarter-finals	Second leg	22–30 March 2021
Knockout stage	Semi-finals	First leg	31 May – 8 June 2021
Knockout stage	Semi-finals	Second leg	31 May – 8 June 2021
Knockout stage	Final	First leg	30 August – 7 September 2021
Knockout stage	Final	Second leg	30 August – 7 September 2021
Play-off round
Play-off	First leg		4–12 October 2021
Play-off	Second leg		4–12 October 2021

However, on 25 June 2020, following FIFA's decision to postpone the September 2020 international window because of the COVID-19 pandemic, CONCACAF noted that "the challenges presented by postponements to the football calendar, and the incomplete FIFA rankings cycle in our confederation, means our current World Cup qualifying process has been compromised and will be changed."

=== New format ===
On 27 July 2020, CONCACAF announced a new qualifying format for the World Cup.

- First round: 30 CONCACAF teams, ranked 6 to 35 based on the FIFA rankings of July 2020, were drawn into six groups of five and played single round-robin matches (two home and two away), with group winners qualifying for the second round.
- Second round: Six first round group winners played in a two-legged home-and-away series. The three winners advanced to the third round.
- Third round: Eight teams, three second round winners and top five CONCACAF teams based on those FIFA rankings, played home-and-away round-robin matches in one single group. The top three teams qualified for the World Cup, and the fourth-placed team advanced to the inter-confederation play-offs.

== Entrants ==
All 35 FIFA-affiliated national teams from CONCACAF originally entered qualification. Teams were seeded based on their July 2026 FIFA rankings.

From the July 2026 FIFA World Rankings
Bye to third round (ranked 1st to 5th)	Competing in first round (ranked 6th to 35th)	
1. Mexico (10); 2. United States (16); 3. Canada (30); 4. Panama (44); 5. Costa Rica (51)	6. Honduras (66); 7. Jamaica (71); 8. Curaçao (82); 9. Haiti (88); 10. Guatemala (98); 11. El Salvador (100); 12. Trinidad and Tobago (102); 13. Suriname (125); 14. Nicaragua (131); 15. Dominican Republic (144); 16. Guyana (150); 17. Saint Kitts and Nevis (152); 18. Puerto Rico (154); 19. Antigua and Barbuda (162); 20. Grenada (163)	21. Saint Vincent and the Grenadines (167); 22. Bermuda (168); 23. Belize (170); 24. Saint Lucia (176)^{W}; 25. Puerto Rico (178); 26. Cuba (179); 27. Montserrat (183); 28. Dominica (184); 29. Cayman Islands (193); 30. Bahamas (195); 31. Aruba (200); 32. Turks and Caicos Islands (203); 33. U.S. Virgin Islands (207); 34. British Virgin Islands (208); 35. Anguilla (210)

== Schedule ==
On 25 June 2020, FIFA announced that the inter-confederation play-offs, originally scheduled to be played in March 2022, were moved to June 2022, and that the June 2021 window would be extended from two matchdays to four for CONCACAF. On 8 September 2020, CONCACAF announced that the matches scheduled for October and November 2020 would be rescheduled to 2021. On 4 December 2020, FIFA announced that the September 2021, October 2021, January 2022 and March 2022 windows in the FIFA International Match Calendar would each be extended by one day to allow for three matchdays to be played per window. On the same day, CONCACAF announced the revised qualification schedule, which was updated on 16 June 2021.

Round	Matchday	Dates
First round	Window 1	24–30 March 2021
First round	Window 2	2–8 June 2021
Second round	First leg	12 June 2021
Second round	Second leg	15 June 2021
Third round	Matchday 1	2 September 2021
Third round	Matchday 2	5 September 2021
Third round	Matchday 3	8 September 2021
Third round	Matchday 4	7 October 2021
Third round	Matchday 5	10 October 2021
Third round	Matchday 6	13 October 2021
Third round	Matchday 7	12 November 2021
Third round	Matchday 8	16 November 2021
Third round	Matchday 9	27 January 2022
Third round	Matchday 10	30 January 2022
Third round	Matchday 11	2 February 2022
Third round	Matchday 12	24 March 2022
Third round	Matchday 13	27 March 2022
Third round	Matchday 14	30 March 2022

Original qualifying schedule (revised format)
Stage	Matchday	FIFA international dates
First round	Window 1	7, 8, 10, 11 & 13 October 2020
First round	Window 2	11, 13, 14 & 17 November 2020
Second round	First leg	22–30 March 2021
Second round	Second leg	22–30 March 2021
Third round	Matchday 1	31 May – 15 June 2021
Third round	Matchday 2	31 May – 15 June 2021
Third round	Matchday 3	31 May – 15 June 2021
Third round	Matchday 4	31 May – 15 June 2021
Third round	Matchday 5	30 August – 7 September 2021
Third round	Matchday 6	30 August – 7 September 2021
Third round	Matchday 7	4–12 October 2021
Third round	Matchday 8	4–12 October 2021
Third round	Matchday 9	8–16 November 2021
Third round	Matchday 10	8–16 November 2021
Third round	Matchday 11	24 January – 1 February 2022
Third round	Matchday 12	24 January – 1 February 2022
Third round	Matchday 13	21–29 March 2022
Third round	Matchday 14	21–29 March 2022

== First round ==
The six highest ranked teams of the first round were pre-seeded into groups A through F. Teams in their groups played each other once, a total of four matches; two home and two away matches. The draw for the first round was held on 19 August 2020, 19:00 CEST (UTC+2), at the FIFA headquarters in Zürich, Switzerland. The top team from each group advanced to the second round. The COVID-19 pandemic caused many "home" games to be played at neutral venues.

=== Group A ===
Pos	Team	Pld	W	D	L	GF	GA	GD	Pts	Qualification	El Salvador	Montserrat	Antigua and Barbuda	Grenada	United States Virgin Islands
1	El Salvador	4	3	1	0	13	1	+12	10	Advance to second round	—	—	3–0	2–0	—
2	Montserrat	4	2	2	0	9	4	+5	8		1–1	—	—	—	4–0
3	Antigua and Barbuda	4	2	1	1	6	5	+1	7		—	2–2	—	1–0	—
4	Grenada	4	1	0	3	2	5	−3	3		—	1–2	—	—	1–0
5	U.S. Virgin Islands	4	0	0	4	0	15	−15	0		0–7	—	0–3	—	—

Source: FIFA
Rules for classification: Tiebreakers

=== Group B ===
Pos	Team	Pld	W	D	L	GF	GA	GD	Pts	Qualification	Canada	Suriname	Bermuda	Aruba	Cayman Islands
1	Canada	4	4	0	0	27	1	+26	12	Advance to second round	—	4–0	5–1	—	—
2	Suriname	4	3	0	1	15	4	+11	9		—	—	6–0	—	3–0
3	Bermuda	4	1	1	2	7	12	−5	4		—	—	—	5–0	1–1
4	Aruba	4	1	0	3	3	19	−16	3		0–7	0–6	—	—	—
5	Cayman Islands	4	0	1	3	2	18	−16	1		0–11	—	—	1–3	—

Source: FIFA
Rules for classification: Tiebreakers

=== Group C ===
Pos	Team	Pld	W	D	L	GF	GA	GD	Pts	Qualification	Curaçao	Guatemala	Cuba	Saint Vincent and the Grenadines	British Virgin Islands
1	Curaçao	4	3	1	0	15	1	+14	10	Advance to second round	—	0–0	—	5–0	—
2	Guatemala	4	3	1	0	14	0	+14	10		—	—	1–0	10–0	—
3	Cuba	4	2	0	2	7	3	+4	6		1–2	—	—	—	5–0
4	Saint Vincent and the Grenadines	4	1	0	3	3	16	−13	3		—	—	0–1	—	3–0
5	British Virgin Islands	4	0	0	4	0	19	−19	0		0–8	0–3	—	—	—

Source: FIFA
Rules for classification: Tiebreakers

=== Group D ===
Pos	Team	Pld	W	D	L	GF	GA	GD	Pts	Qualification	Panama	Dominican Republic	Barbados	Dominica	Anguilla
1	Panama	4	4	0	0	19	1	+18	12	Advance to second round	—	3–0	1–0	—	—
2	Dominican Republic	4	2	1	1	8	4	+4	7		—	—	1–1	1–0	—
3	Barbados	4	1	2	1	3	3	0	5		—	—	—	1–1	1–0
4	Dominica	4	1	1	2	5	4	+1	4		1–2	—	—	—	3–0
5	Anguilla	4	0	0	4	0	23	−23	0		0–13	0–6	—	—	—

Source: FIFA
Rules for classification: Tiebreakers

=== Group E ===
Pos	Team	Pld	W	D	L	GF	GA	GD	Pts	Qualification	Haiti	Nicaragua	Belize	Turks and Caicos Islands	Saint Lucia
1	Haiti	3	3	0	0	13	0	+13	9	Advance to second round	—	1–0	2–0	—	—
2	Nicaragua	3	2	0	1	10	1	+9	6		—	—	3–0	—	—
3	Belize	3	1	0	2	5	5	0	3		—	—	—	5–0	—
4	Turks and Caicos Islands	3	0	0	3	0	22	−22	0		0–10	0–7	—	—	—
5	Saint Lucia	0	0	0	0	0	0	0	0	Withdrew	—	—	—	—	—

Source: FIFA
Rules for classification: Tiebreakers

=== Group F ===
Pos	Team	Pld	W	D	L	GF	GA	GD	Pts	Qualification	Saint Kitts and Nevis	Trinidad and Tobago	Puerto Rico	Guyana	Bahamas
1	Saint Kitts and Nevis	4	3	0	1	8	2	+6	9	Advance to second round	—	—	1–0	3–0	—
2	Trinidad and Tobago	4	2	2	0	6	1	+5	8		2–0	—	—	3–0	—
3	Puerto Rico	4	2	1	1	10	2	+8	7		—	1–1	—	—	7–0
4	Guyana	4	1	0	3	4	8	−4	3		—	—	0–2	—	4–0
5	Bahamas	4	0	1	3	0	15	−15	1		0–4	0–0	—	—	—

Source: FIFA
Rules for classification: Tiebreakers

== Second round ==
The second round saw the six group winners from the first round playing in three home-and-away ties of predetermined pairings. The winners advanced to the third round.

Team 1	Agg.	Team 2	1st leg	2nd leg
Saint Kitts and Nevis	0–6	El Salvador	0–4	0–2
Haiti	0–4	Canada	0–1	0–3
Panama	2–1	Curaçao	2–1	0–0

== Third round ==
As a result of CONCACAF's revision to their World Cup qualifying format, the traditional Hexagonal with six teams and ten games per team was expanded to eight teams and fourteen games per team for the final and decisive round. The top five CONCACAF teams in the July 2020 FIFA rankings entered in the third round, joining the three winners of the second round. The draw to determine the schedule for the third round was held on 19 August 2020, 19:00 CEST (UTC+2), at the FIFA headquarters in Zürich, Switzerland.

Pos	Team	Pld	W	D	L	GF	GA	GD	Pts	Qualification	Canada	Mexico	United States	Costa Rica	Panama	Jamaica	El Salvador	Honduras
1	Canada	14	8	4	2	23	7	+16	28	2022 FIFA World Cup	—	2–1	2–0	1–0	4–1	4–0	3–0	1–1
2	Mexico	14	8	4	2	17	8	+9	28	2022 FIFA World Cup	1–1	—	0–0	0–0	1–0	2–1	2–0	3–0
3	United States	14	7	4	3	21	10	+11	25	2022 FIFA World Cup	1–1	2–0	—	2–1	5–1	2–0	1–0	3–0
4	Costa Rica	14	7	4	3	13	8	+5	25	Inter-confederation play-offs	1–0	0–1	2–0	—	1–0	1–1	2–1	2–1
5	Panama	14	6	3	5	17	19	−2	21		1–0	1–1	1–0	0–0	—	3–2	2–1	1–1
6	Jamaica	14	2	5	7	12	22	−10	11		0–0	1–2	1–1	0–1	0–3	—	1–1	2–1
7	El Salvador	14	2	4	8	8	18	−10	10		0–2	0–2	0–0	1–2	1–0	1–1	—	0–0
8	Honduras	14	0	4	10	7	26	−19	4		0–2	0–1	1–4	0–0	2–3	0–2	0–2	—

Source: FIFA, CONCACAF
Rules for classification: Tiebreakers

== Inter-confederation play-off ==
The inter-confederation play-offs was determined by a draw held on 26 November 2021. The fourth-placed team from CONCACAF qualification third round was drawn against the representative team from the OFC. The play-off was played as a single match in Qatar (host country of the World Cup) on 14 June 2022.

Team 1	Score	Team 2
Costa Rica	1–0	New Zealand

== Qualified teams ==
Status of CONCACAF countries with respect to the 2022 FIFA World Cup: Team has qualified for World Cup Team failed to qualify Team suspended Country not a CONCACAF member

The following four teams from CONCACAF qualified for the final tournament.

Team	Qualified as	Qualified on	Previous appearances in FIFA World Cup^{1}
Canada	Third round winners	27 March 2022	1 (1986)
Mexico	Third round runners-up	30 March 2022	16 (1930, 1950, 1954, 1958, 1962, 1966, 1970, 1978, 1986, 1994, 1998, 2002, 2006, 2010, 2014, 2018)
United States	Third round third place	30 March 2022	10 (1930, 1934, 1950, 1990, 1994, 1998, 2002, 2006, 2010, 2014)
Costa Rica	CONCACAF v OFC play-off winners	14 June 2022	5 (1990, 2002, 2006, 2014, 2018)

^{1} Italic indicates hosts for that year.

== Top goalscorers ==
There were 345 goals scored in 118 matches, for an average of 2.92 goals per match.

13 goals

- (Canada men's national soccer team) Cyle Larin

9 goals

- (Canada men's national soccer team) Jonathan David

8 goals

- (El Salvador national football team) David Rugamas

7 goals

- (Panama national football team) Cecilio Waterman

6 goals

- (Suriname national football team) Nigel Hasselbaink

5 goals

- (Canada men's national soccer team) Lucas Cavallini
- (Canada men's national soccer team) Alphonso Davies
- (Montserrat national football team) Lyle Taylor
- (Panama national football team) Gabriel Torres
- (United States men's national soccer team) Christian Pulisic

4 goals

- (Haiti national football team) Duckens Nazon
- (Panama national football team) Rolando Blackburn
- (Puerto Rico national football team) Ricardo Rivera
- (Saint Kitts and Nevis national football team) Keithroy Freeman

Links to the lists of goalscorers for each round are below:

- First round
- Second round
- Third round
