= Junior Hoilett =

Canadian soccer player

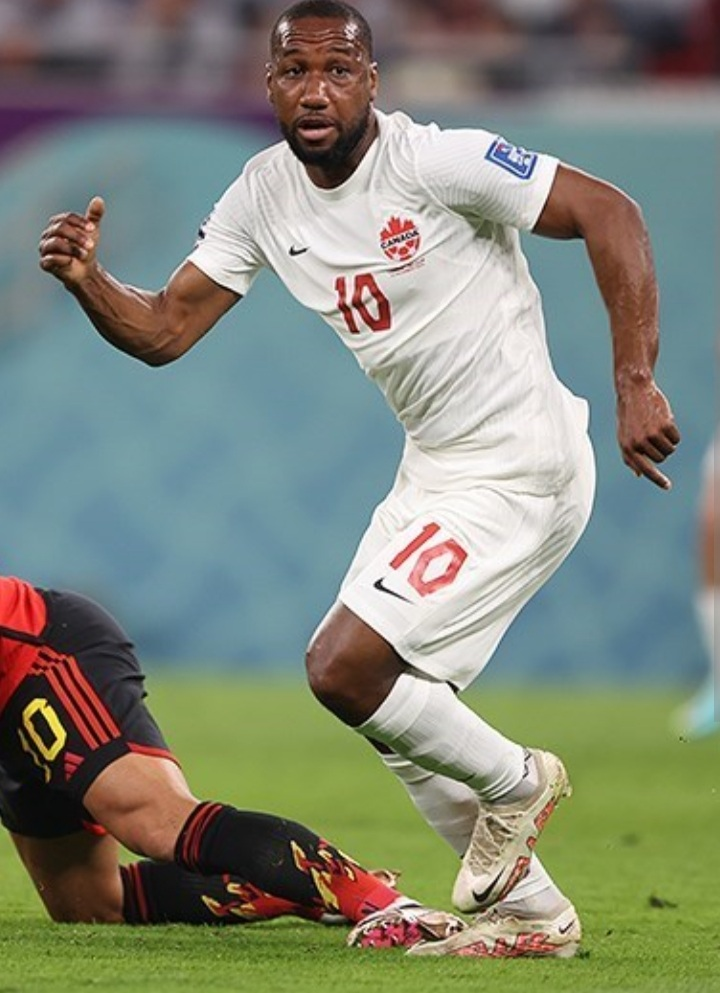
- Hoilett playing for Canada at the 2022 FIFA World Cup

Personal information
- Full name: David Wayne Hoilett
- Date of birth: 5 June 1990 (age 36)
- Place of birth: Brampton, Ontario, Canada
- Height: 1.74 m (5 ft 9 in)
- Position: Left winger

Youth career
- Brampton YSC
- CS Azzurri
- Oakville SC
- 2003–2007: Blackburn Rovers

Senior career*
Years	Team	Apps	(Gls)
2007–2012	Blackburn Rovers	81	(12)
2007–2008	→ SC Paderborn (loan)	13	(1)
2008–2009	→ FC St. Pauli (loan)	26	(6)
2012–2016	Queens Park Rangers	112	(11)
2016–2021	Cardiff City	173	(23)
2021–2023	Reading	61	(4)
2023	Vancouver Whitecaps FC	7	(0)
2024	Aberdeen	13	(2)
2024–2026	Hibernian	45	(7)
2026	Swindon Town	14	(1)

International career^{‡}
2015–2026	Canada	70	(17)
Medal record
Representing Canada
Men's soccer
CONCACAF Nations League
Runner-up	2023
- * Club domestic league appearances and goals as of 2 May 2026 ‡ National team caps and goals as of 26 September 2026

David Wayne Hoilett (born 5 June 1990), better known as Junior Hoilett, is a Canadian professional soccer player who plays as a left winger.

After impressing in a youth tournament, Hoilett signed for English club Blackburn Rovers at the age of 13, and was loaned to SC Paderborn and FC St. Pauli in the German 2. Bundesliga due to work permit issues. He made his Rovers debut in 2009 and played three full Premier League seasons for them before a transfer to Queens Park Rangers in 2012. Hoilett spent four years at the Loftus Road club – alternately in the Premier League and Championship – before moving to Cardiff on the expiration of his contract.

In his second season with Cardiff, he helped the side win promotion to the Premier League by finishing as Championship runners-up during the 2017–18 season. He has also played for Scottish Premiership side Aberdeen. On 2 February 2026, Hoilett signed a contract with Swindon Town until the end of the season.

Hoilett made his senior international debut for Canada in 2015. He was part of their squad at the CONCACAF Gold Cup in 2017, 2019, 2021 and 2023, reaching the semi-finals of the 2021 tournament. He was also named to their 2022 FIFA World Cup squad, appearing in all three of Canada's games at the tournament.

== Early life ==
Hoilett was born in Brampton, Ontario, one of four children to David and Ingrid Hoilett. Both of his parents are of Jamaican descent, with his father hailing from Ocho Rios. His father previously worked as a DJ and music promoter. He has described his upbringing as "a very sporty childhood", playing against his three siblings in numerous sports. Hoilett played both baseball and basketball at youth level before settling on association football at age 11.

His younger brother Jaineil also became a footballer, playing in Germany at amateur level. He played youth soccer in Canada with Brampton Youth SC, CS Azzurri, and Oakville SC. He travelled the world with his club and gained attention at a tournament in Wales; he turned down an extended trial with Manchester United to join Blackburn Rovers as he believed he had more chance of breaking into the first team at the latter. After taking a year to make the decision to move to England, Hoilett signed for Rovers in 2003. After moving to England, he attended St Bede's Roman Catholic High School in Blackburn.

== Club career ==
Hoilett progressed through Blackburn's youth system before signing his first contract at the age of 16. However, he suffered a setback when he was initially unable to earn a work permit to play in the United Kingdom. In order to qualify for one in future, Blackburn looked to loan Hoilett to a club in another European country, with the player rejecting possible moves to Belgium and France.

Hoilett eventually agreed to a loan move to Germany, joining SC Paderborn. He made his senior debut for the club against Kickers Offenbach, coming on as a substitute for Sven Lintjens in a 3–2 victory on 3 February 2008, aged 17. Hoilett's first match in the starting eleven was against 1899 Hoffenheim on 9 March 2008.

Hoilett scored his only goal of his loan campaign on 18 May 2008, against Borussia Mönchengladbach in what would be his final game for the club. Paderborn were later relegated, ending the 2007–08 2. Bundesliga season in 17th position.

Hoilett was loaned to another German club in the 2. Bundesliga, FC St. Pauli, for the 2008–09 2. Bundesliga season. He made his debut for the Hamburg-based side against Greuther Fürth on 22 August 2008. He scored six times during his loan campaign with braces against Alemannia Aachen and Hansa Rostock, as well as individual goals against 1860 Munich and 1. FC Kaiserslautern. His final game would come in the form of a 1–0 loss against Rot Weiss Ahlen on 3 May 2009. St. Pauli finished the season in eighth place.

=== Blackburn Rovers ===
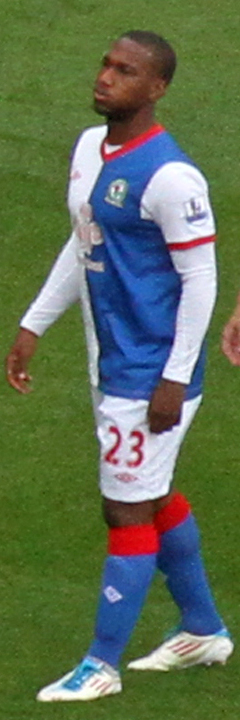
Hoilett before the match between Blackburn Rovers and Arsenal at Ewood Park on 17 September 2011

In January 2009, Hoilett's home club Blackburn again applied for him to receive a work permit for him to play football in England. In the summer of 2009, Hoilett was granted a work permit on appeal, allowing him to continue his fledgling career in England at the Premier League level with Blackburn. Blackburn chose not to send him to a third loan spell in Germany, rejecting an approach from Mainz 05.

After impressing during the club's pre-season schedule, Hoilett made his debut for Blackburn in the opening day of the 2009–10 season as a late substitute in place of El Hadji Diouf during a 2–0 defeat to Manchester City. He was named in the starting line-up for the team's following match and scored his first competitive goal for Rovers in a 3–1 League Cup win over Gillingham on 25 August 2009. His performances in the early stages of the campaign prompted the club to open talks over a contract extension as Hoilett was in the final year of his original deal. Hoilett was involved in Blackburn's dramatic League Cup win against Chelsea on 2 December 2009.

Coming on as a second half substitution, he won a stoppage time penalty which Benni McCarthy converted to put Rovers 3–2 up, before Paulo Ferreira equalised in the 122nd minute. However, Hoilett converted the fifth penalty to help Rovers to a 4–3 shoot-out win and a place in the semi-finals. He then started his first league match on 12 December against Hull City, playing the full 90 minutes in a 0–0 draw at the KC Stadium.

On 25 February 2010, with his contract due to expire in June 2010, Hoilett ended speculation regarding his future at the club, by signing a new two-and-a-half-year deal with Blackburn, keeping him at the club until the summer of 2012. He finished the season having made 27 appearances in all competitions, scoring once.

Hoilett made his first Premier League appearance of the 2010–11 season on 21 August 2010, coming on for Nikola Kalinić in the 84th minute in a 2–1 defeat at St Andrew's against Birmingham City. Hoilett scored his first goal of the 2010–11 season in the 1–0 victory over Queens Park Rangers in the FA Cup third round.

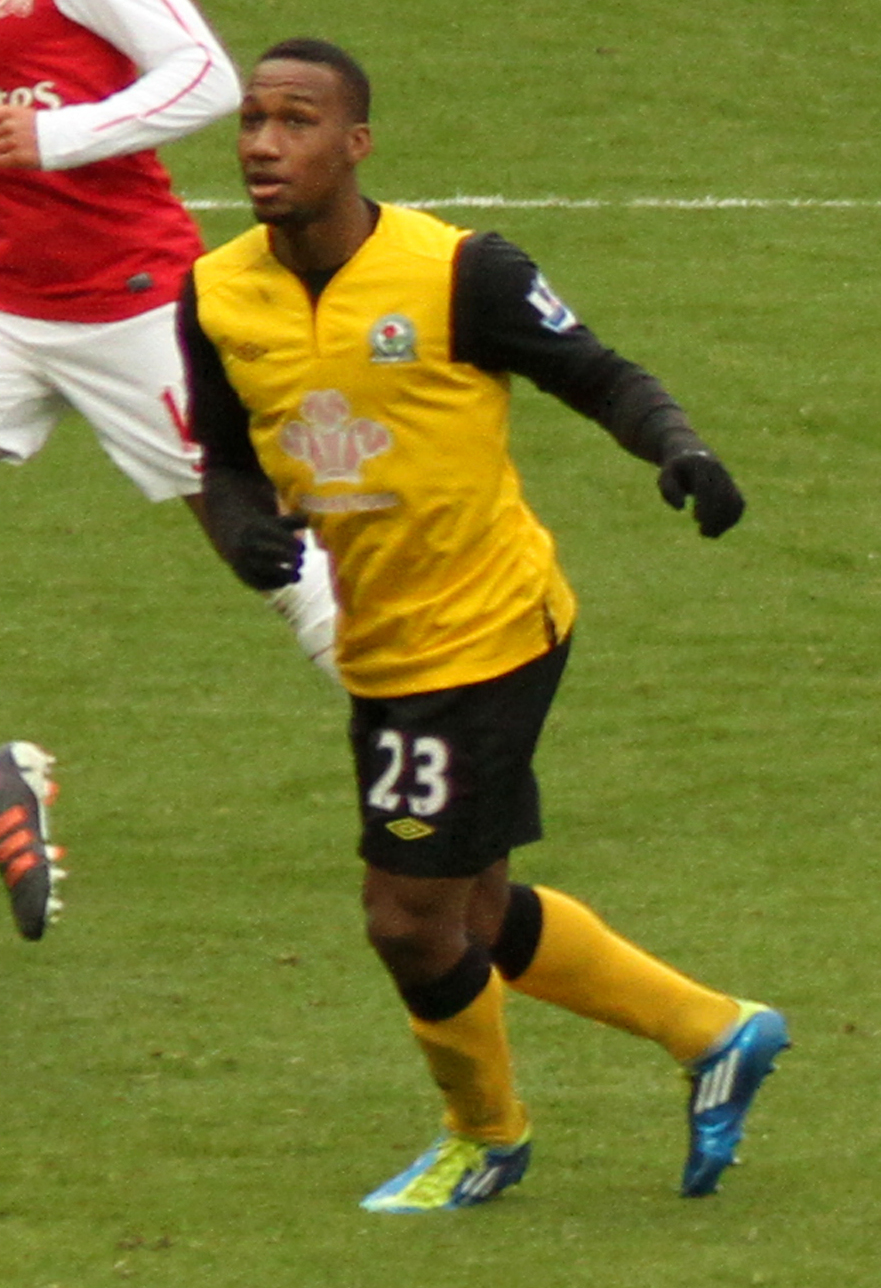
Hoilett playing for Blackburn Rovers in 2012

Hoilett scored his first league goal on 23 January 2011, in a 2–0 home victory against West Bromwich Albion at Ewood Park, converting in the 47th minute from a Nikola Kalinić assist. On 12 February 2011, he made his fortieth Premier League appearance for Blackburn when he featured against Newcastle United in a goalless draw, and was replaced at half-time due to a slight hamstring strain by Morten Gamst Pedersen.

On 5 March, he scored his third goal of the season in a 3–2 defeat against Fulham in the 65th minute, away at Craven Cottage. He was replaced by debutant Rubén Rochina after 82 minutes. Hoilett's next goal came in the following game, a last gasp equaliser from a header against Blackpool in a 2–2 home draw. On 9 April 2011, Hoilett scored in the 1–1 draw against Birmingham City before half time, but was injured in the 68th minute, being replaced by Australian Brett Emerton.

Hoilett scored his fifth league goal of the campaign with an individual effort, coming in a 3–2 win against Wolverhampton Wanderers at Molineux Stadium on the last day of the season. On 11 September 2011, in a game between Blackburn and Fulham, he was involved in a collision with Mark Schwarzer which resulted in a head injury for Hoilett. He was eventually stretchered off and Schwarzer received a yellow card.

Hoilett scored Blackburn's controversial second goal in their 3–3 draw with Wigan Athletic, after teammate Morten Gamst Pedersen seemed to dribble the ball straight from a corner before firing in a low cross for Hoilett to head home from two yards.

In January 2012, Hoilett was named one of the thirteen players to watch in 2012 by world football governing body FIFA.

In the 2011–12 season, Hoilett had the most dribbles per game among all Premier League players.

=== Queens Park Rangers ===
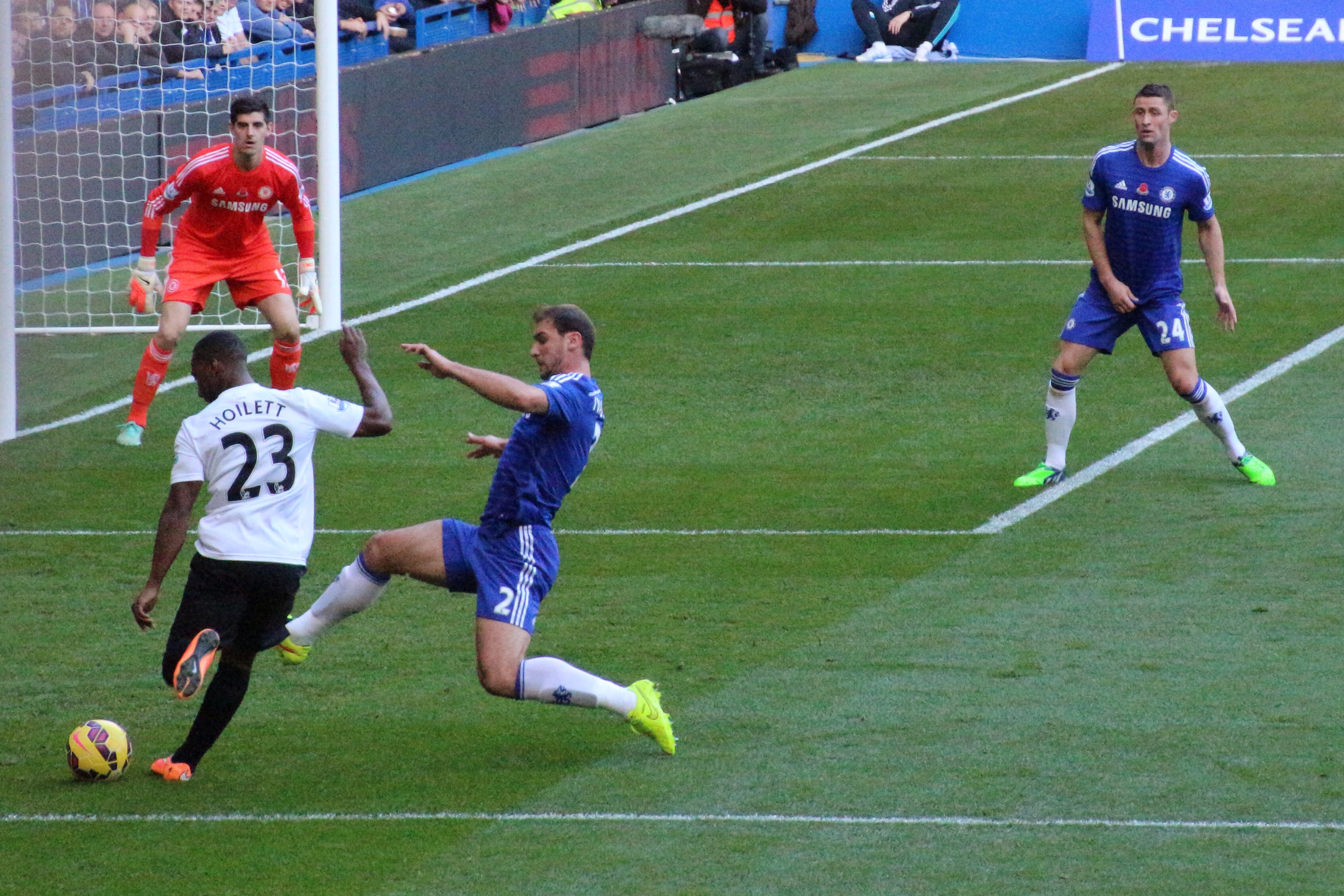
Hoilett (in white) playing against Chelsea in November 2014

After refusing a contract renewal with Blackburn Rovers, Hoilett joined Queens Park Rangers on 27 July 2012, for a fee decided by tribunal. He signed a four-year contract. He scored his first goal for QPR in a 2–3 League Cup defeat to Reading on 26 September 2012. On 2 March 2013, Hoilett set-up teammate Loïc Rémy and played a crucial part in a 2–1 win over Southampton. A combination of injuries and poor form meant that Hoilett had a frustrating first season at QPR, which resulted in relegation to the Championship.

Hoilett scored his first goal of the 2013–14 Championship season in a 1–1 draw with Huddersfield Town. Four months later, he scored his second goal of the season in a comfortable 3–0 win over AFC Bournemouth at Loftus Road. In QPR's 1–0 victory over Derby County at Wembley Stadium in the Championship play-off final, Hoilett grabbed an assist for the only goal of the game, when he crossed for Bobby Zamora to score in the 89th minute, as QPR gained promotion back to the Premier League after an absence of one season. After failing to agree a new contract with QPR at the end of the 2015–16 season, Hoilett left the club following the expiry of his current deal.

=== Cardiff City ===
Following the appointment of Neil Warnock as manager, Hoilett signed with Cardiff City on 6 October 2016, becoming Warnock's first signing at the club. His debut came on 14 October, against severnside rivals Bristol City. Hoilett scored his first goal for Cardiff during a 3–2 victory over Huddersfield Town on 19 November 2016. He went on to score one more goal before signing a one-year contract extension in May 2017.

The 2017–18 season saw Hoilett's most productive campaign, finishing the season with twelve goals, including scoring against former club Queens Park Rangers, and notching a brace against Mansfield Town in the FA Cup, as Cardiff finished second, gaining promotion to the Premier League. Hoilett was offered a new contract following the club promotion.

On 26 June 2018, Hoilett signed a three-year contract in the Welsh capital. He scored his first Premier League goal since 2012 in a 2–1 comeback win over Wolverhampton Wanderers on 30 November, which BBC Sport called a "fabulous first-time effort from 25 yards".

On 9 May 2021, Hoilett announced his departure from Cardiff City at the end of his contract via Instagram. He had spent five years with the club, amassing 184 appearances across all competitions. His last appearance for the club came on 27 January against Barnsley in the first game in charge for new manager Mick McCarthy, but he did not feature at all the rest of the season.

=== Reading ===
On 19 August 2021, Hoilett signed for Reading on a one-year contract. His first goal for the club came at the Cardiff City Stadium on 2 October, the only goal in a win over his former club.

In July 2022 Hoilett re-signed with Reading on another one-year deal. During the 2022–23 season Hoilett began featuring at wing-back for the club, earning praise for his performances by coach Paul Ince, heralding him as "unplayable." He departed the club after their relegation at the end of the season, despite being offered a new contract.

=== Vancouver Whitecaps FC ===
On 14 September 2023, Major League Soccer club Vancouver Whitecaps FC announced they had reached a deal with Hoilett to join the club for the remainder of the 2023 MLS season. He made his debut on 20 September, entering the match as a second-half substitute for Ryan Raposo in an eventual 4–1 defeat to the Houston Dynamo. At the end of the 2023 season, it was announced that the club would not renew his contract.

=== Aberdeen ===
On 16 February 2024, Junior signed for Scottish Premiership club Aberdeen on a short term deal until the end of the 2023–24 season, reuniting with manager Neil Warnock. He made his debut the next day against Hibernian, entering the match as a substitute in a 2–2 draw and becoming the first Canadian player to ever play for the club. On 30 July, after being offered a new deal he left the club saying that his "time at Aberdeen has come to [an] end, I would like to thank the club for the opportunity and the fans for making my short spell memorable".

=== Hibernian ===
On 6 August 2024, Hoilett joined Hibernian on a one-year deal. He scored four goals and assisted five others in 30 appearances during the 2024–25 season, as Hibs finished third in the Scottish Premiership. On 1 July 2025, Hoilett signed a new one-year contract with Hibs.

=== Swindon Town ===
On 2 February 2026, Hoilett joined League Two club Swindon Town on a short-term deal until the end of the season.

He was released upon the expiry of his short-term deal at the end of the 2025–26 season.

== International career ==
As a child, Hoilett captained Canada's team at the 2001 Danone Nations Cup in Paris.

Hoilett was eligible to play for either Canada or Jamaica at international level. In February 2011, he rejected a call-up from the Canada national team, stating that he wanted more time to develop his club career before committing to international football. In January 2012, Jamaica Football Federation president Horace Burrell confirmed that he had approached the player's father about Hoilett representing Jamaica, with his father keen for him to represent the Caribbean nation. In March 2012, Hoilett told various media bodies that he would consider playing for England if eligible.

Hoilett officially declared for Canada in September 2015, prior to the fourth round of CONCACAF 2018 World Cup Qualifying. He received his first international cap in a 1–1 draw against Ghana on 13 October 2015, at RFK Stadium in Washington, D.C. He officially got cap-tied to Canada after starting for the nation in a 2018 World Cup qualification match against Honduras. Hoilett was named to Canada's squad for the 2017 CONCACAF Gold Cup on 27 June 2017, and scored his first international goal in the quarter-finals on 20 July, in a 1–2 defeat to eventual finalists Jamaica.

Hoilett was named to the final 23-man squad for the 2019 CONCACAF Gold Cup on 20 May 2019. He scored in victories over Martinique and Cuba – each breaking the record for the country's biggest win in the competition – as the Canadians advanced to the quarter-finals. Hoilett was named Canada's captain for the first time in a CONCACAF Nations League match against Cuba on 7 September 2019; he scored three goals in a 6–0 victory. In doing so, Hoilett became the third Canadian player in 2019 to net a hat-trick against Cuba, following Jonathan David and Lucas Cavallini.

Hoilett was called-up to Canada's squad for the 2021 CONCACAF Gold Cup on 1 July. He scored in a 4–1 group win over Haiti and a 2–0 quarter-final win over Costa Rica as the team reached the semi-finals for the first time since 2007.

Hoilett scored the third goal on 27 March 2022 as Canada defeated Jamaica 4–0 in 2022 FIFA World Cup qualification, thereby making the World Cup for the first time since 1986. In November 2022, Hoilett was named to Canada’s 26-man squad for the 2022 FIFA World Cup. He appeared in all three matches for Canada, as the squad exited after the group stage.

In June 2023, Hoilett was named to Canada's squad contesting the 2023 CONCACAF Nations League Finals. On 19 June, he was named to the 2023 CONCACAF Gold Cup squad.

In June 2024, Hoilett was initially named to Canada's squad for the 2024 Copa América, but was forced to withdraw following a lower-body injury in training camp and was replaced by Joel Waterman.

In September 2026, he was called up for a final time, as a celebration of his time with the national team, making his 70th appearance in a friendly against Chile being honoured in a post-game ceremony.

== Career statistics ==
=== Club ===
As of match played 2 May 2026

Appearances and goals by club, season and competition
Club	Season	League			National cup (Note: Includes FA Cup, DFB Pokal, Canadian Championship and Scottish Cup)		League cup (Note: Includes Football League Cup and Scottish League Cup)		Other		Total	
Club	Season	Division	Apps	Goals	Apps	Goals	Apps	Goals	Apps	Goals	Apps	Goals
Blackburn Rovers	2007–08	Premier League	0	0	0	0	0	0	—		0	0
Blackburn Rovers	2008–09	Premier League	0	0	0	0	0	0	—		0	0
Blackburn Rovers	2009–10	Premier League	23	0	0	0	4	1	—		27	1
Blackburn Rovers	2010–11	Premier League	24	5	2	1	2	0	—		28	6
Blackburn Rovers	2011–12	Premier League	34	7	0	0	3	0	—		37	7
Blackburn Rovers	Total		81	12	2	1	9	1	—		92	14
SC Paderborn (loan)	2007–08	2. Bundesliga	13	1	—		—		—		13	1
FC St. Pauli (loan)	2008–09	2. Bundesliga	26	6	1	0	—		—		27	6
Queens Park Rangers	2012–13	Premier League	26	1	0	0	2	1	—		28	2
Queens Park Rangers	2013–14	Championship	35	4	0	0	1	0	3 (Note: Appearance(s) in Championship play-offs)	0	39	4
Queens Park Rangers	2014–15	Premier League	22	0	1	0	1	0	—		24	0
Queens Park Rangers	2015–16	Championship	29	6	0	0	2	0	—		31	6
Queens Park Rangers	Total		112	11	1	0	6	1	3	0	122	12
Cardiff City	2016–17	Championship	33	2	0	0	0	0	—		33	2
Cardiff City	2017–18	Championship	46	9	3	2	1	0	—		50	11
Cardiff City	2018–19	Premier League	32	3	1	0	0	0	—		33	3
Cardiff City	2019–20	Championship	41	7	1	0	1	0	2	0	45	7
Cardiff City	2020–21	Championship	21	2	1	0	1	0	0	0	23	2
Cardiff City	Total		173	23	6	2	3	0	2	0	184	25
Reading	2021–22	Championship	27	3	0	0	0	0	—		27	3
Reading	2022–23	Championship	34	1	1	0	0	0	—		35	1
Reading	Total		61	4	1	0	0	0	—		62	4
Vancouver Whitecaps	2023	MLS	7	2	—		—		2 (Note: Appearances in MLS Cup playoffs)	0	9	2
Aberdeen	2023–24	Scottish Premiership	13	2	2	0	—		—		15	2
Hibernian	2024–25	Scottish Premiership	28	4	2	0	0	0	—		30	4
Hibernian	2025–26	Scottish Premiership	14	3	1	0	2	0	6 (Note: Two appearances in UEFA Europa League, four appearances in UEFA Conference League)	0	23	3
Hibernian	Total		42	7	3	0	2	0	6	0	53	7
Swindon Town	2025–26	League Two	14	1	0	0	0	0	—		14	1
Career total			542	68	16	3	20	1	13	0	591	72

=== International ===
As of match played September 26, 2026

Appearances and goals by national team and year
National team	Year	Apps	Goals
Canada	2015	3	0
Canada	2016	7	0
Canada	2017	7	1
Canada	2018	3	2
Canada	2019	8	6
Canada	2021	12	4
Canada	2022	14	1
Canada	2023	9	3
Canada	2024	3	1
Canada	2025	3	0
Canada	2026	2	0
Total		70	17

Scores and results list Canada's goal tally first, score column indicates score after each Hoilett goal.

List of international goals scored by Junior Hoilett
No.	Date	Venue	Cap	Opponent	Score	Result	Competition	Ref.
1	20 July 2017	State Farm Stadium, Glendale, United States	16	Jamaica	1–2	1–2	2017 CONCACAF Gold Cup	
2	9 September 2018	IMG Academy, Bradenton, United States	18	U.S. Virgin Islands	6–0	8–0	2019–20 CONCACAF Nations League qualifying	
3	16 October 2018	BMO Field, Toronto, Canada	19	Dominica	2–0	5–0	2019–20 CONCACAF Nations League qualifying	
4	24 March 2019	BC Place, Vancouver, Canada	21	French Guiana	1–0	4–1	2019–20 CONCACAF Nations League qualifying	
5	15 June 2019	Broncos Stadium, Denver, United States	23	Martinique	3–0	4–0	2019 CONCACAF Gold Cup	
6	23 June 2019	Bank of America Stadium, Charlotte, United States	24	Cuba	5–0	7–0	2019 CONCACAF Gold Cup	
7	7 September 2019	BMO Field, Toronto, Canada	26	Cuba	1–0	6–0	2019–20 CONCACAF Nations League A	
8	7 September 2019	BMO Field, Toronto, Canada	26	Cuba	3–0	6–0	2019–20 CONCACAF Nations League A	
9	7 September 2019	BMO Field, Toronto, Canada	26	Cuba	6–0	6–0	2019–20 CONCACAF Nations League A	
10	5 June 2021	IMG Academy, Bradenton, United States	31	Aruba	2–0	7–0	2022 FIFA World Cup qualification	
11	15 June 2021	SeatGeek Stadium, Bridgeview, United States	32	Haiti	3–0	3–0	2022 FIFA World Cup qualification	
12	15 July 2021	Children's Mercy Park, Kansas City, United States	34	Haiti	4–1	4–1	2021 CONCACAF Gold Cup	
13	25 July 2021	AT&T Stadium, Arlington, United States	36	Costa Rica	1–0	2–0	2021 CONCACAF Gold Cup	
14	27 March 2022	BMO Field, Toronto, Canada	45	Jamaica	3–0	4–0	2022 FIFA World Cup qualification	
15	4 July 2023	Shell Energy Stadium, Houston, United States	59	Cuba	1–0	4–2	2023 CONCACAF Gold Cup	
16	13 October 2023	Denka Big Swan Stadium, Niigata, Japan	61	Japan	1–4	1–4	Friendly	
17	15 November 2024	Dr. Ir. Franklin Essed Stadion, Paramaribo, Suriname	65	Suriname	1–0	1–0	2024–25 CONCACAF Nations League A	

== Honours ==
Queens Park Rangers

- Football League Championship play-offs: 2014

Cardiff City

- EFL Championship second-place promotion: 2017–18

Canada

- CONCACAF Nations League runner-up: 2023

Individual

- BBC Goal of the Month: November 2018
