= Ravis =

Ravis is a surname. Notable people with the surname include:

- Christian Ravis (1613–1677), German orientalist and theologian
- Donald Ravis (1891–1973), 1940), Progressive Conservative party member of the House of Commons of Canada
- Guntis Ravis, Latvian businessman and chairman of the board of the largest construction company in Latvia
- Thomas Ravis (c. 1560–1609), Church of England bishop and academic

== See also ==
- Ravi (disambiguation)
