= Rawi =

Rawi or al-Rawi may refer to:

== People ==
=== Given name ===
- Rawi Abdelal, American academic
- Rawi Bhavilai (1925–2017), Thai astronomer and writer
- Rawi Cundy (1901–1955), New Zealand rugby union player
- Rawi Hage (born 1964), Lebanese-Canadian novelist

=== Surname ===
- Ahmed Al-Rawi (born 2004), Qatari footballer
- Bassam Al-Rawi (born 1997), Qatari footballer
- Bisher Amin Khalil al-Rawi (born 1960), Iraqi citizen and former detainee at Guantanamo Bay detention camp
- Faris Al-Rawi (born 1971), Trinidad and Tobago politician
- Fawzi Mutlaq al-Rawi (1940–2021), alleged Ba'athist leader in Iraq
- Manaf Abd al-Rahim al-Rawi (1975–2013), Iraqi terrorist and senior leader of Islamic State of Iraq
- Mohammed A.F. Al-Rawi (1952–2003), Iraqi physiologist
- Nuri al-Rawi (1925–2014), Iraqi painter
- Saif Al-Din Al-Rawi (born 1949), Iraqi military leader
- Shahad Al Rawi (born 1986), Iraqi writer
- Suhaib al-Rawi (born 1966), Iraqi politician

== Others ==
- a rāwī, a reciter and transmitter of Arabic poetry
- a person from Rawa, Iraq
- Ar-Rawi (magazine)
- Al-Rawi (television series)

== See also ==
- Ravi (disambiguation)
