= List of international goals scored by Almoez Ali =

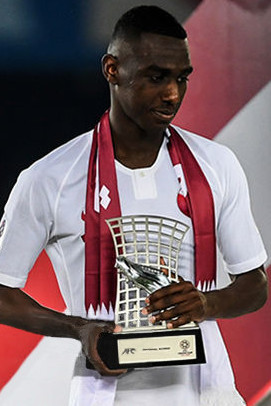
Ali with the 2019 AFC Asian Cup Golden Boot trophy after winning the tournament with Qatar

Almoez Ali is a Qatari professional footballer who represents the Qatar national team as a striker. As of 17 November 2026, he has scored 61 goals in 134 official international appearances since his debut on 21 December 2013 against Bahrain, making him the country's all-time top goalscorer.

On 16 June 2019, Ali scored in Qatar's 2–2 draw with Paraguay in the 2019 Copa América. Ali was also included in Qatar's squad for the 2021 CONCACAF Gold Cup, scoring four goals in the competition to clinch the top scorer award. In November 2022, he was included in Qatar's squad for the 2022 FIFA World Cup. He started in all three group matches as Qatar made its first appearance at the tournament.

== International goals ==
Scores and results list Qatar's goal tally first, score column indicates score after each Ali goal.
As of match played 30 September 2026

List of international goals scored by Almoez Ali
No.	Cap	Date	Venue	Opponent	Score	Result	Competition	Ref.
1	14	5 October 2017	Jassim bin Hamad Stadium, Doha, Qatar	Singapore	1–0	3–1	Friendly	
2	14	5 October 2017	Jassim bin Hamad Stadium, Doha, Qatar	Singapore	2–0	3–1	Friendly	
3	18	14 December 2017	Hamad bin Khalifa Stadium, Doha, Qatar	Liechtenstein	1–0	1–2	Friendly	
4	19	23 December 2017	Al Kuwait Sports Club Stadium, Kuwait City, Kuwait	Yemen	3–0	4–0	23rd Arabian Gulf Cup	
5	20	26 December 2017	Al Kuwait Sports Club Stadium, Kuwait City, Kuwait	Iraq	1–0	1–2	23rd Arabian Gulf Cup	
6	24	7 September 2018	Khalifa International Stadium, Al Rayyan, Qatar	China	1–0	1–0	Friendly	
7	25	11 September 2018	Khalifa International Stadium, Al Rayyan, Qatar	Palestine	1–0	3–0	Friendly	
8	26	12 October 2018	Jassim bin Hamad Stadium, Doha, Qatar	Ecuador	2–0	4–3	Friendly	
9	26	12 October 2018	Jassim bin Hamad Stadium, Doha, Qatar	Ecuador	4–1	4–3	Friendly	
10	30	23 December 2018	Khalifa International Stadium, Al Rayyan, Qatar	Jordan	1–0	2–0	Friendly	
11	33	9 January 2019	Hazza bin Zayed Stadium, Al Ain, United Arab Emirates	Lebanon	2–0	2–0	2019 AFC Asian Cup	
12	34	13 January 2019	Sheikh Khalifa International Stadium, Al Ain, United Arab Emirates	North Korea	1–0	6–0	2019 AFC Asian Cup	
13	34	13 January 2019	Sheikh Khalifa International Stadium, Al Ain, United Arab Emirates	North Korea	2–0	6–0	2019 AFC Asian Cup	
14	34	13 January 2019	Sheikh Khalifa International Stadium, Al Ain, United Arab Emirates	North Korea	4–0	6–0	2019 AFC Asian Cup	
15	34	13 January 2019	Sheikh Khalifa International Stadium, Al Ain, United Arab Emirates	North Korea	5–0	6–0	2019 AFC Asian Cup	
16	35	17 January 2019	Zayed Sports City Stadium, Abu Dhabi, United Arab Emirates	Saudi Arabia	1–0	2–0	2019 AFC Asian Cup	
17	35	17 January 2019	Zayed Sports City Stadium, Abu Dhabi, United Arab Emirates	Saudi Arabia	2–0	2–0	2019 AFC Asian Cup	
18	38	29 January 2019	Mohammed bin Zayed Stadium, Abu Dhabi, United Arab Emirates	United Arab Emirates	2–0	4–0	2019 AFC Asian Cup	
19	39	1 February 2019	Zayed Sports City Stadium, Abu Dhabi, United Arab Emirates	Japan	1–0	3–1	2019 AFC Asian Cup	
20	41	16 June 2019	Maracanã Stadium, Rio de Janeiro, Brazil	Paraguay	1–2	2–2	2019 Copa América	
21	44	5 September 2019	Jassim bin Hamad Stadium, Doha, Qatar	Afghanistan	1–0	6–0	2022 FIFA World Cup qualification	
22	44	5 September 2019	Jassim bin Hamad Stadium, Doha, Qatar	Afghanistan	2–0	6–0	2022 FIFA World Cup qualification	
23	44	5 September 2019	Jassim bin Hamad Stadium, Doha, Qatar	Afghanistan	5–0	6–0	2022 FIFA World Cup qualification	
24	47	15 October 2019	Jassim bin Hamad Stadium, Doha, Qatar	Oman	2–1	2–1	2022 FIFA World Cup qualification	
25	50	29 November 2019	Khalifa International Stadium, Al Rayyan, Qatar	Yemen	3–0	6–0	24th Arabian Gulf Cup	
26	53	12 October 2020	Mardan Sports Complex, Aksu, Turkey	Ghana	1–1	1–5	Friendly	
27	55	17 November 2020	BSFZ-Arena, Maria Enzersdorf, Austria	South Korea	1–1	1–2	Friendly	
28	56	4 December 2020	Abdullah bin Khalifa Stadium, Doha, Qatar	Bangladesh	3–0	5–0	2022 FIFA World Cup qualification	
29	56	4 December 2020	Abdullah bin Khalifa Stadium, Doha, Qatar	Bangladesh	4–0	5–0	2022 FIFA World Cup qualification	
30	62	4 July 2021	Stadion Aldo Drosina, Pula, Croatia	El Salvador	1–0	1–0	Friendly	
31	63	13 July 2021	BBVA Stadium, Houston, United States	Panama	2–1	3–3	2021 CONCACAF Gold Cup	
32	64	17 July 2021	BBVA Stadium, Houston, United States	Grenada	4–0	4–0	2021 CONCACAF Gold Cup	
33	66	24 July 2021	State Farm Stadium, Glendale, United States	El Salvador	1–0	3–2	2021 CONCACAF Gold Cup	
34	66	24 July 2021	State Farm Stadium, Glendale, United States	El Salvador	3–0	3–2	2021 CONCACAF Gold Cup	
35	74	14 November 2021	Baku Olympic Stadium, Baku, Azerbaijan	Azerbaijan	1–0	2–2	Friendly	
36	74	14 November 2021	Baku Olympic Stadium, Baku, Azerbaijan	Azerbaijan	2–2	2–2	Friendly	
37	77	6 December 2021	Al Bayt Stadium, Al Khor, Qatar	Iraq	1–0	3–0	2021 FIFA Arab Cup	
38	78	10 December 2021	Al Bayt Stadium, Al Khor, Qatar	United Arab Emirates	2–0	5–0	2021 FIFA Arab Cup	
39	78	10 December 2021	Al Bayt Stadium, Al Khor, Qatar	United Arab Emirates	5–0	5–0	2021 FIFA Arab Cup	
40	90	27 October 2022	Marbella Football Center, Marbella, Spain	Honduras	1–0	1–0	Friendly	
41	91	5 November 2021	Marbella Football Center, Marbella, Spain	Panama	1–0	2–1	Friendly	
42	92	9 November 2021	Marbella Football Center, Marbella, Spain	Albania	1–0	1–0	Friendly	
43	103	16 November 2023	Khalifa International Stadium, Al Rayyan, Qatar	Afghanistan	2–1	8–1	2026 FIFA World Cup qualification	
44	103	16 November 2023	Khalifa International Stadium, Al Rayyan, Qatar	Afghanistan	4–1	8–1	2026 FIFA World Cup qualification	
45	103	16 November 2023	Khalifa International Stadium, Al Rayyan, Qatar	Afghanistan	5–1	8–1	2026 FIFA World Cup qualification	
46	103	16 November 2023	Khalifa International Stadium, Al Rayyan, Qatar	Afghanistan	6–1	8–1	2026 FIFA World Cup qualification	
47	104	21 November 2023	Kalinga Stadium, Bhubaneswar, India	India	2–0	3–0	2026 FIFA World Cup qualification	
48	105	31 December 2023	Thani bin Jassim Stadium, Al Rayyan, Qatar	Cambodia	1–0	3–0	Friendly	
49	105	31 December 2023	Thani bin Jassim Stadium, Al Rayyan, Qatar	Cambodia	2–0	3–0	Friendly	
50	105	31 December 2023	Thani bin Jassim Stadium, Al Rayyan, Qatar	Cambodia	3–0	3–0	Friendly	
51	107	12 January 2024	Lusail Stadium, Lusail, Qatar	Lebanon	2–0	3–0	2023 AFC Asian Cup	
52	111	7 February 2024	Al Thumama Stadium, Doha, Qatar	Iran	3–2	3–2	2023 AFC Asian Cup	
53	114	26 March 2024	Ali Sabah Al-Salem Stadium, Ardiya, Kuwait	Kuwait	1–0	2–1	2026 FIFA World Cup qualification	
54	114	26 March 2024	Ali Sabah Al-Salem Stadium, Ardiya, Kuwait	Kuwait	2–1	2–1	2026 FIFA World Cup qualification	
55	116	10 September 2024	New Laos National Stadium, Vientiane, Laos	North Korea	2–1	2–2	2026 FIFA World Cup qualification	
56	117	10 October 2024	Al Thumama Stadium, Doha, Qatar	Kyrgyzstan	1–0	3–1	2026 FIFA World Cup qualification	
57	118	15 October 2024	Rashid Stadium, Dubai, United Arab Emirates	Iran	1–0	1–4	2026 FIFA World Cup qualification	
58	119	14 November 2024	Jassim bin Hamad Stadium, Doha, Qatar	Uzbekistan	1–0	3–2	2026 FIFA World Cup qualification	
59	119	14 November 2024	Jassim bin Hamad Stadium, Doha, Qatar	Uzbekistan	2–0	3–2	2026 FIFA World Cup qualification	
60	122	24 December 2024	Sulaibikhat Stadium, Kuwait City, Kuwait	Oman	1–0	1–2	26th Arabian Gulf Cup	
61	131	30 September 2026	King Abdullah Sports City Stadium, Jeddah, Saudi Arabia	United Arab Emirates	1–0	1–1	27th Arabian Gulf Cup	

== Hat-tricks ==
No.	Date	Venue	Opponent	Goals	Result	Competition	Ref.
1	13 January 2019	Sheikh Khalifa International Stadium, Al Ain, United Arab Emirates	North Korea	4 - (9', 11', 55', 60')	6–0	2019 AFC Asian Cup	
2	5 September 2019	Jassim bin Hamad Stadium, Doha, Qatar	Afghanistan	3 - (4', 10', 51')	6–0	2022 FIFA World Cup qualification	
3	16 November 2023	Khalifa International Stadium, Al Rayyan, Qatar	Afghanistan	4 - (15', 26', 33' pen, 48' pen)	8–1	2026 FIFA World Cup qualification	
4	31 December 2023	Thani bin Jassim Stadium, Al Rayyan, Qatar	Cambodia	3 - (12', 20', 43')	3–0	Friendly	

== Statistics ==
As of match played 17 November 2026

Appearances and goals by year
Year	Apps	Goals
2013	1	0
2016	3	0
2017	17	5
2018	11	5
2019	20	15
2020	4	4
2021	24	10
2022	15	3
2023	10	8
2024	18	10
2025	4	0
2026	7	1
Total	134	61

Goals by competition
Competition	Goals
FIFA World Cup qualification	18
AFC Asian Cup	11
Arabian Gulf Cup	5
FIFA Arab Cup	3
Copa América	1
CONCACAF Gold Cup	4
Friendlies	19
Total	61

Goals by opponent
Opponent	Goals
Afghanistan	7
North Korea	5
United Arab Emirates	4
Cambodia	3
El Salvador	3
Azerbaijan	2
Bangladesh	2
Ecuador	2
Iran	2
Iraq	2
Kuwait	2
Lebanon	2
Oman	2
Panama	2
Saudi Arabia	2
Singapore	2
Uzbekistan	2
Yemen	2
Albania	1
China	1
Ghana	1
Grenada	1
Honduras	1
India	1
Japan	1
Jordan	1
Kyrgyzstan	1
Liechtenstein	1
Palestine	1
Paraguay	1
South Korea	1
Total	61

== See also ==
- List of top international men's association football goal scorers by country
- List of men's footballers with 100 or more international caps
