= Bassam Al-Rawi =

Iraqi-born Qatari footballer (born 1997)

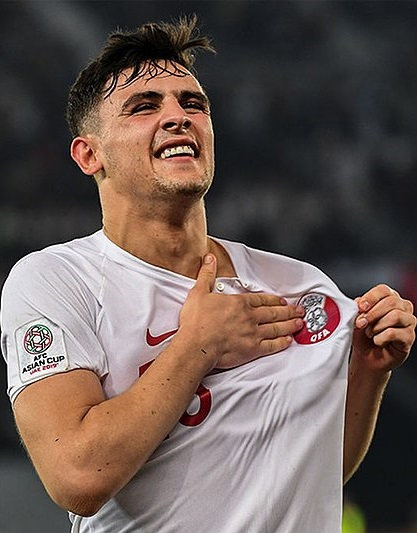
- Bassam celebrating Qatar's victory in the 2019 AFC Asian Cup Final

Personal information
- Full name: Bassam Hisham Ali Al-Rawi
- Date of birth: 16 December 1997 (age 28)
- Place of birth: Baghdad, Iraq
- Height: 1.75 m (5 ft 9 in)
- Positions: Centre back; right back

Team information
- Current team: Al-Duhail
- Number: 5

Youth career
- –2015: Al-Rayyan

Senior career*
Years	Team	Apps	(Gls)
2015–2017	Al-Rayyan		
2016	→ Celta Vigo B (loan)		
2016–2017	→ Eupen B (loan)		
2017–	Al-Duhail	103	(5)
2018	Al-Duhail B	3	(1)
2023–2024	→ Al-Rayyan (loan)	21	(0)

International career^{‡}
2015–2016	Qatar U20	7	(1)
2016–2017	Qatar U23	9	(0)
2017–2025	Qatar	74	(2)
Medal record
Representing Qatar
Men's Football
AFC Asian Cup
Winner	2019 UAE	Team
Winner	2023 Qatar	Team
- * Club domestic league appearances and goals as of 17 January 2026 ‡ National team caps and goals as of 3 October 2026 (UTC)

Bassam Hisham Ali Al-Rawi (Arabic: بسام هشام الراوي; born 16 December 1997) is a professional footballer who plays as a defender for Al-Duhail and the Qatar national football team. Born in Iraq, he represented the Qatar national team.

== Personal life ==
Born in Iraq, Bassam was naturalized to represent the Qatar national team. Bassam's father, Hisham Ali Al-Rawi, played for the Iraq national football team in the 1990s. His brother Ahmed is also a footballer. Bassam attended school in Qatar before being admitted to the Aspire Academy.

== International career ==
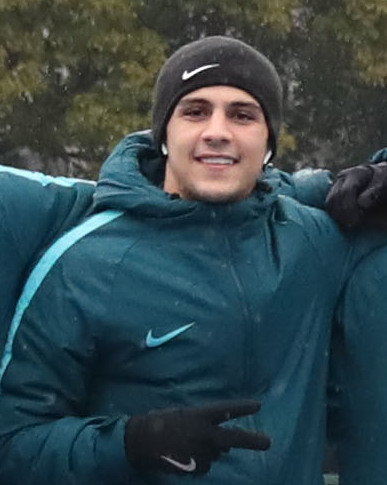
Bassam playing for the Qatari under-23 team in January 2018

=== 2019 AFC Asian Cup ===
Bassam made his appearance for Qatar in a 0-1 loss to Czech Republic in Abdullah bin Khalifa Stadium. He was included in Félix Sánchez Bas' Qatari squad for the 2019 AFC Asian Cup in the United Arab Emirates. He made his first international goal on 9 January 2019 against Lebanon. On 22 January, he scored his second international and the winning goal for Qatar against his country of origin, Iraq, which helped his team reach the quarter-finals of the competition. His team would eventually conquer the Asian title for the first time.

=== Eligibility dispute ===
On 30 January 2019, soon after the 2019 Asian Cup semi-final tie between the UAE and Qatar, which Qatar won 4–0, the UAE Football Association lodged a formal appeal on the fact that Bassam did not qualify to play for Qatar on residency grounds of the Article 7 of the FIFA statutes, which states a player's eligibility to play for a representative team if he has "lived continuously for at least five years after reaching the age of 18 on the territory of the relevant association". It was claimed that Bassam had not lived continuously in Qatar for at least five years over the age of 18. On 1 February 2019, the AFC Disciplinary and Ethics Committee dismissed the protest lodged by the United Arab Emirates Football Association.

== Career statistics ==
=== International ===
As of 3 September 2025

Qatar
Year	Apps	Goals
2017	3	0
2018	10	0
2019	14	2
2021	22	0
2022	7	0
2023	11	0
2024	5	0
2025	2	0
Total	74	2

=== International goals ===
Scores and results list Qatar's goal tally first.

No.	Date	Venue	Opponent	Score	Result	Competition
1.	9 January 2019	Hazza bin Zayed Stadium, Al Ain, United Arab Emirates	Lebanon	1–0	2–0	2019 AFC Asian Cup
2.	22 January 2019	Al Nahyan Stadium, Abu Dhabi, United Arab Emirates	Iraq	1–0	1–0	2019 AFC Asian Cup

== Honours ==
Al-Duhail

- Qatar Stars League: 2017–18, 2019–20
- Emir of Qatar Cup: 2018, 2019
- Qatar Cup: 2018

Qatar

- AFC Asian Cup: 2019, 2023

Individual

- AFC Asian Cup Team of the Tournament: 2019
- Qatar Stars League Team of the Year: 2023–24
