= Qatar national football team =

Men's association football team

Qatar
- Nickname(s): العنابي, al-ʿAnnābī (The Maroons)
- Association: Qatar Football Association (QFA)
- Confederation: AFC (Asia)
- Sub-confederation: WAFF (West Asia)
- Head coach: Julen Lopetegui
- Captain: Akram Afif
- Most caps: Hassan Al-Haydos (194)
- Top scorer: Almoez Ali (61)
- Home stadium: Various
- FIFA code: QAT
First colours	Second colours

FIFA ranking
- Current: 61 ▼1 (18 November 2026)
- Highest: 34 (April and July 2024)
- Lowest: 113 (November 2010)

First international
- Bahrain 2–1 Qatar (Isa Town, Bahrain; 27 March 1970)

Biggest win
- Qatar 15–0 Bhutan (Doha, Qatar; 3 September 2015)

Biggest defeat
- Kuwait 9–0 Qatar (Kuwait; 8 January 1973)

World Cup
- Appearances: 2 (first in 2022)
- Best result: Group stage (2022, 2026)

Asian Cup
- Appearances: 12 (first in 1980)
- Best result: Champions (2019, 2023)

Arab Cup
- Appearances: 4 (first in 1985)
- Best result: Runners-up (1998)
- Website: qfa.qa

The Qatar national football team (Arabic: منتخب قطر لكرة القدم), nicknamed "The Maroons", represents Qatar in international football, and is controlled by the Qatar Football Association, which is affiliated with the Asian Football Confederation (AFC) and comes under the global jurisdiction of world football’s governing body FIFA. They play their home games at Jassim bin Hamad Stadium.

The team won the Arabian Gulf Cup in 1992, 2004 and 2014. They have appeared in ten Asian Cup tournaments and won it twice in 2019 and 2023, beating Japan, Saudi Arabia, and South Korea in the process during 2019, conceding just one goal.

Qatar hosted the 2022 FIFA World Cup and therefore qualified automatically for what was their first appearance in the event. Amidst the controversy, it was the first time an Arab nation hosted the competition. On 25 November 2022, Qatar were the first team to be eliminated from the World Cup; subsequently, they became the worst performing host nation in the history of the FIFA World Cup, losing every game. On 14 October 2025, Qatar qualified directly for the 2026 FIFA World Cup after a 2–1 victory over the United Arab Emirates.

Qatar has footballing rivalries with Bahrain, United Arab Emirates, and Saudi Arabia.

== History ==
=== Early years (1940s–1950s) ===
Football was brought to Qatar during a time which coincided with the initial discovery of oil reserves in Dukhan in 1940. By 1948, teams were created by expatriate oil workers from countries such as India, and various Arabian nations. Among the first documented teams in Qatar were a team formed for the Northern Arab Region, and a team formed near the Al-Khatia area of Dukhan. The first tournament in the country was the "Ezz Eddin Tournament", held by the Qatar Oil Company in 1951. In the late 1950s, the name was changed to the "Pukett Cup".

With the growing interest in football, The Qatar Football Association (QFA) was established in 1960, and the QFA joined FIFA in 1963. Simultaneously during this period, the Bahrain Football Association were drawing up plans for the establishment of a regional football competition within the GCC and Qatari officials were involved with the collaboration of this proposal. The plans came to fruition and in March 1970, when the Arabian Gulf Cup was inaugurated.

=== Rise of Qatari football: 1970s–1980s ===
The Qatar national team played its first official match on 27 March 1970 against hosts Bahrain in the 1970 Gulf Cup, losing 1–2 with Mubarak Faraj scoring the sole goal for Qatar. The newly formed Qatar side gave underwhelming performances in the tournament, coming in last place with a single point, with the highlight of their tournament being a 1–1 draw with rivals Saudi Arabia in their final match, and player Khaled Ballan winning the Best Player of the Tournament.

In 1972, the next edition of the 1972 Gulf Cup, Qatar again finished last place after suffering 3 straight defeats. The next tournament in 1974 proved to be somewhat of a breakthrough for the Qataris as they achieved their first triumph in international football with a 4–0 victory over Oman. The team lost to Saudi Arabia in the semi-finals, where they achieved a 3rd place finish in the tournament, after emerging victorious in a penalty shoot-out against the United Arab Emirates, Qatari player Mohammed Ghanim won the Best Player of the Tournament award.

Qatar entered the 1976 AFC Asian Cup qualification for the AFC Asian Cup which was held in the next year. They were not successful in qualifying, with Iraq and Saudi Arabia qualifying. Despite this setback, Qatar went on to finish 3rd place in the 1976 Gulf Cup as the host nation the next year, solidifying themselves as one of the best teams in the Arab region, with emerging players such as Mansour Muftah, Khaled Ballan, Mohammed Ghanim.

The national team participated in the FIFA World Cup qualifiers match for the 1978 FIFA World Cup. Qatar was set to play the United Arab Emirates on 11 March 1977, but a last-minute with-drawal of the Emiratis team from the competition merely postponed Qatar's debut until two days later when Bahrain were defeated 2–0 in Doha.

=== 1980s–1990s ===
Qatar debuted for their first AFC Asian Cup in the 1980 AFC Asian Cup under Brazilian head coach Evaristo. They had qualified for the tournament after topping a relatively easy group composing of Bangladesh and Afghanistan. In the main tournament, Qatar was unsuccessful in advancing to the knockout stage, making an early exit from the competition with two defeats, one draw and one win.

In 1984, Qatar narrowly lost to Iraq in the finals of the 1984 Gulf Cup, nonetheless they were named runners-up, one of their most impressive achievements until their 1992 Gulf Cup.

They failed to make it out of the preliminary stages of the 1982 and 1986 FIFA World Cup qualifying rounds. However, the team qualified for both the 1984 and 1988 editions of the Asian Cup. They fell short of qualifying for the semi-finals of the 1984 tournament, with Saudi Arabia's Mohaisen Al-Jam'an's 88th-minute goal against Kuwait, ensuring a semi-final position for both teams. They also missed out on a semi-final place in 1988, however, they notably defeated Japan by a score of 3–0.

=== Golden era: 1990s–2000s ===
Qatar arguably reached its peak in the 1990s, attaining a FIFA rating of (53) in August 1993. Qatar started off with an emphatic qualifying campaign for the 1990 FIFA World Cup, finishing at the top of their group. However they couldn't advance in the tournament, due to finishing below the United Arab Emirates and South Korea in the final round of the qualifiers.

In the 1990 Gulf Cup, the national team once again finished runners-up as Kuwait won the final two matches of the tournament.

In 1992, they won the 1992 Gulf Cup on home soil for the first time under the leadership of Sebastião Lapola, despite a 1–0 loss against Saudi Arabia in their final game. Mubarak Mustafa, won both the top scorer and man of the tournament awards. They were also named runners-up in the 1996 Gulf Cup.

Qatar reached the Asian Zone's final qualifying round for the 1998 FIFA World Cup. After wins against China and Iran, they played their last match against Saudi Arabia, where a victory would have earned qualification. However, they lost out as Saudi Arabia won 1–0 to reach the finals.

As 1998 Arab Cup hosts, they finished runners-up to Saudi Arabia.

=== 2000–2010 ===
They made it to the quarter-finals of the 2000 AFC Asian Cup despite finishing 3rd in their group, but lost to China in their quarter-final confrontation.

They reached the final qualifying round again in 2001 but were defeated by Bora Milutinovic's China team, who topped the section to progress to their first FIFA World Cup. Frenchman Philippe Troussier took the manager's job after the 2002 FIFA World Cup in Korea and Japan, but was unsuccessful in both the 2004 AFC Asian Cup and the qualifying campaign for the 2006 FIFA World Cup in Germany.

Troussier was sacked after the World Cup qualifying campaign, and under Bosnian Džemaludin Mušović, the team won the Gulf Cup in 2004 and the under 23 teams' Asian Games gold in 2006. Mušović stepped down after Qatar only earned two points from three matches in the 2007 AFC Asian Cup.

The job of coaching the team in qualifying for the 2010 FIFA World Cup fell to Uruguayan head coach Jorge Fossati, who led the team throughout the first and second AFC rounds up to the third round. After leaving them at the top of their group with only two played matches, Fossati had to undergo stomach surgery. Subsequently, the Qatar Football Association ended their cooperation with him in September 2008, as the QFA claimed he needed too long to recover from surgery. Bruno Metsu was called up for the job, but Qatar failed to qualify after finishing fourth in their qualifying group.

=== 2010–2020 ===
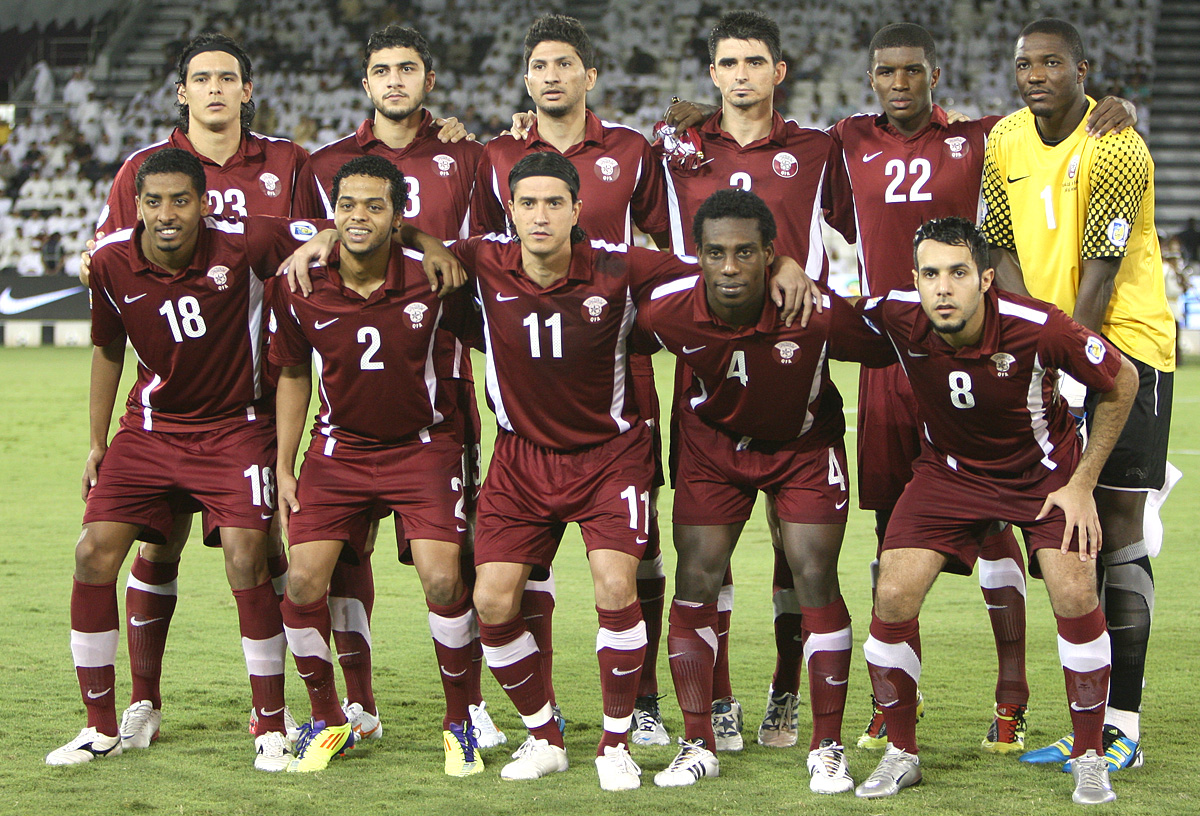
Qatar national team in 2011 during the 2014 FIFA World Cup qualifying rounds.

Qatar was announced as hosts of the 2022 FIFA World Cup in December 2010.

In 2011, as hosts of the 2011 AFC Asian Cup, they advanced to the quarter-finals. They succumbed to a late 2–3 defeat to eventual champions Japan after a goal was scored by Masahiko Inoha in the 89th minute.

Also, as hosts, they went on to win the 2013 WAFF Championship after defeating Jordan 2–0 in the final. The competition was made up primarily of youth and reserve teams, of which Qatar's was the latter. Djamel Belmadi, the head coach of the B team, replaced Fahad Thani as the head coach of the senior team as a result of the team's positive performances. 10 months later, Djamel Belmadi led Qatar to gold in the 2014 Gulf Cup. They advanced from the group stages after three draws, going on to defeat Oman 3–1 in the semi-final, and were victorious in the final against Saudi Arabia, who was playing in front of a home crowd, by a margin of 2–1.

Despite winning the Gulf Cup and finishing the year 2014 with only one defeat, Qatar showed poor form in the 2015 AFC Asian Cup. Qatar was defeated 1–4 by the United Arab Emirates in their opener. This was continued with a 0–1 loss to Iran and 1–2 to Bahrain. Qatar was eliminated in the group stages with no points and placed 4th in Group C.

Qatar's campaign in qualifying for the 2018 FIFA World Cup in Russia was a surprise. Their start in the second round of FIFA World Cup qualifying in the AFC was nearly perfect, with seven wins and only one loss. However, their success in the second round didn't follow them to the third round. Qatar finished bottom of their group, ensuring they would play their first World Cup match on home soil in 2022, the first team to do so since Italy in 1934.

Qatar continued its poor form in the 2017 Gulf Cup, which was hosted by Kuwait. Qatar opened the tournament with a 4–0 win against Yemen, but that was followed by a 1–2 loss to Iraq and an unconvincing 1–1 draw to Bahrain. Qatar took third place in Group B with four points and was eliminated in the group stage of the competition, which was considered an upsetting of the tournament, especially after winning the 2014 edition.

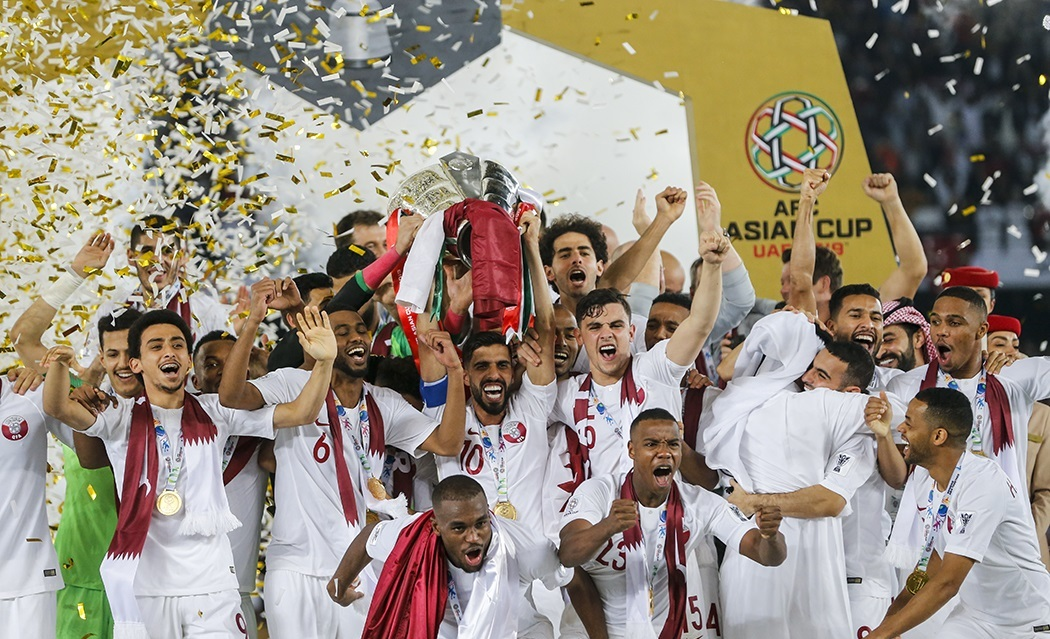
Qatar's players celebrating the country's first-ever Asian Cup title in 2019.

Qatar starting line-up against Japan at the 2019 AFC Asian Cup Final, a match they won 3–1.

However, Qatar had an excellent campaign at the 2019 AFC Asian Cup. Their opener saw them defeat Lebanon 2–0. This was followed by a 6–0 thrashing of North Korea and a 2–0 win against three-time champions Saudi Arabia, which sealed the team getting first place in the group. They had a 1–0 win against Iraq in the Round of 16 and a late win against defending runners-up South Korea in the quarter-finals, seeing them through to the semi-finals for the first time ever, where they defeated the hosts United Arab Emirates 4–0 to set up a final against 4-time winners Japan. Qatar ended up winning the final 3–1 over Japan, marking their first-ever major tournament title in their history, and capping off one of the most improbable Asian Cup runs in the tournament's history, especially since they conceded only one goal in all their games.

Qatar was invited to the 2019 Copa América. They were placed in Group B with Colombia, Argentina and Paraguay. Their first game was against Paraguay where they came back from a 2–0 deficit to tie it 2–2, but this marked the first time Qatar suffered more than one goal in any major competition since winning the Asian Cup in the UAE. It was followed by a 0–1 loss to Colombia, ending the team's undefeated streak in any major competition to eight. A 0–2 loss to Argentina meant Qatar took the last place in Group B with a single point and was eliminated in the group stage of the competition.

=== Preparation for the FIFA World Cup as host: 2020–present ===
Despite Qatar having automatic qualification for the 2022 World Cup as hosts, they had to play the AFC qualifiers in the second round as part of it also acting as qualification for the 2023 AFC Asian Cup and won 7 of 8 games, conceding only one goal.

Qatar was invited for the first time to the 2021 CONCACAF Gold Cup. They played in Group D with Honduras, Panama and Grenada. In December 2020, UEFA invited Qatar to play friendlies against the teams in Group A of the 2022 World Cup qualifying group – Azerbaijan, Luxembourg, Portugal, the Republic of Ireland and Serbia – as five teams in one group means one team will not be playing on any given match day. These friendlies did not count in the qualifying group standings. Qatar played their "home" matches in Europe in order to allow short travel times for their opponents.

Qatar opening match starting line-up against Ecuador at the 2022 FIFA World Cup.

In the 2021 CONCACAF Gold Cup, Qatar claimed 7 points in Group D. Their debut was against Panama with a 3–3 draw, ensuring them their first point. This was followed by a 4–0 victory over Grenada and a 2–0 win over Honduras ensuring a quarter-final place where they would face El Salvador, ultimately securing a semi-final place against the United States with a 3–2 win. However, against the hosts with its squad made up of the majority of MLS players, Qatar failed to find the way to the net, in spite of having a penalty in the 60th minute, ultimately conceding a late goal from Gyasi Zardes to end Qatar's campaign with a 1–0 loss. In the 2021 FIFA Arab Cup, Qatar won all of its group-stage matches and faced UAE, winning 5–0. They lost 2–1 in the semi-final against Algeria, eventually placing 3rd.

Despite the very successful performance of Qatar in various major tournaments, the 2022 FIFA World Cup held at home proved to be a nightmare for the Qataris. Being automatically drawn into the Group A as hosts, Qatar started with a 0–2 loss to Ecuador in the opening match, conceding two goals in the first half from Enner Valencia, making Qatar the first host country to lose their opening game. The situation did not improve for the Qataris in their second meeting with Senegal, when the Africans beat the Qataris 3–1 to condemn the hosts to an early World Cup exit, becoming the second host country after South Africa, the 2010 FIFA World Cup hosts, to have such an unwanted record (although they were eliminated only on inferior goal differences to Mexico after three matches); they became the first host team to be eliminated after two group games and guaranteed to be the worst-host ever, although Ghanaian-born Mohammed Muntari became Qatar's first World Cup scorer in this game. With Qatar's elimination confirmed, the hosts then fell to the Netherlands 0–2, making an unwanted record as the first hosts to score the fewest goals (1), the first to lose all three group games (all previous hosts had won a match), and the lowest-ranked team in the tournament (ranked 32nd).

14 months later, they would redeem themselves at the 2023 AFC Asian Cup, also held at home. The Maroons defeated Lebanon 3–0 to start off their campaign, and they entered the round of 16 as group winners following 2 other successes, all without conceding a goal. They had to overcome Palestine (2–1) and then Uzbekistan in the next round (1–1 a.e.t., 3 p.s.o. to 2) to reach the last four, but without convincing. After defeating Iran narrowly in a 3–2 dramatic semifinal match, they would face off against Jordan in the final, where a penalty hat-trick by Akram Afif helped Qatar defeat Jordan 3–1 to clinch their second successive AFC Asian Cup, becoming the first team since Japan to successfully defend their title. Following Qatar’s successful defence of Asian cup title, Akram Afif was named 2023 AFC player of the year at the AFC annual Awards in October 2024, becoming the first Qatari player to receive the award twice

On 14 October 2025, Qatar secured qualification for the 2026 FIFA World Cup after defeating the United Arab Emirates 2–1 at the Jassim bin Hamad Stadium in Doha, Qatar. The result marked their first-ever qualification for a World Cup through the standard AFC qualification process, having previously participated in 2022 as hosts.

== Team image ==
=== Kits and crest ===
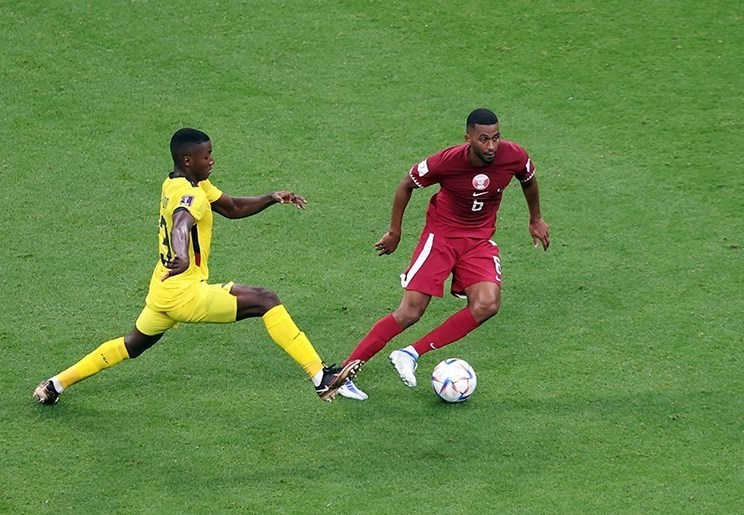
Qatar v Ecuador at the 2022 FIFA World Cup.

Qatar wears all-maroon as their home colours and all-white colours as an away kit. Their first manufacturer was Umbro from 1980 to 1984. All Qatar kits are currently manufactured by Adidas.

Kit suppliers	Period
(United Kingdom) Umbro	1980–1984
(Germany) Adidas	1984–1992
(Egypt) Venecia	1993–1995
(Thailand) Grand Sport	1996–2002
(Germany) Adidas	2002–2008
(Switzerland) Burrda	2009–2011
(United States) Nike	2012–2024
(Germany) Adidas	2024–present

== Rivalries ==
As of 30 July 2021

=== Bahrain ===
Statistics vs. Bahrain
Pld	W	D	L	GF	GA	GD
39	8	19	11	32	36	−4

Qatar has a major rivalry against Bahrain due to historical tension between the two countries. With 39 matches played, the overall record favours Bahrain, who won 11 matches, lost 8, and tied 19. From 2004 until 2021, Qatar suffered a winless streak over Bahrain with six defeats and ten draws before finally registering a win in the 2021 FIFA Arab Cup.

=== United Arab Emirates ===
Statistics vs. United Arab Emirates
Pld	W	D	L	GF	GA	GD
34	14	9	11	47	40	+7

The rivalry with United Arab Emirates is a competitive one in the Arabian Gulf Cup meeting on multiple occasions, due to the 2017–2021 Qatar diplomatic crisis, increasing tensions had been witnessed, with the captain of UAE under-19 youth team refusing to shake hands with Qatar's youth captain in 2018 AFC U-19 Championship held in Indonesia; in this tournament, the UAE beat Qatar 2–1 but still crashed out from the group stage while Qatar would recover to qualify for the 2019 FIFA U-20 World Cup. As of 2020, Qatar and UAE have played 31 official matches, most of which was held competitively in the Arabian Gulf Cup, it started off with the United Arab Emirates beating Qatar 1–0. They only played 2 friendly games and the last friendly was held in 2011 which ended with an Emirati victory. In the 2019 AFC Asian Cup, hosted by the UAE, Qatar overran the UAE for the first time since 2001 with a result of 4–0, with heavy tensions occurring between the two teams and Emirati supporters cheering anti-Qatari chants.

=== Saudi Arabia ===
Statistics vs. Saudi Arabia
Pld	W	D	L	GF	GA	GD
41	8	16	17	31	53	−22

Qatar has a major rivalry against Saudi Arabia due to historical tension between the two countries and the 2017–2021 Qatar diplomatic crisis. Qatar has an overall negative record against Saudi Arabia; with 41 matches played, Qatar has won 8 matches, lost 17, and tied 16.

== Results and fixtures ==
The following is a list of match results in the last 12 months, as well as any future matches that have been scheduled.

Win Draw Loss Fixture

=== 2025 ===
1 December 2025 FIFA Arab Cup	Qatar	0–1	Palestine	Al Khor, Qatar
18:45 UTC+3		Report	Al-Brake 90+5' (o.g.)	Stadium: Al Bayt Stadium; Attendance: 61,475; Referee: Glenn Nyberg (Sweden)

4 December 2025 FIFA Arab Cup	Syria	1–1	Qatar	Al Rayyan, Qatar
20:00 UTC+3	Khribin 90'	Report	Alaaeldin 77'	Stadium: Khalifa International Stadium; Attendance: 42,467; Referee: Mario Escobar (Guatemala)

7 December 2025 FIFA Arab Cup	Qatar	0–3	Tunisia	Al Khor, Qatar
20:00 UTC+3		Report	Ben Romdhane 16'; Meriah 62'; Ben Ali 90+4'	Stadium: Al Bayt Stadium; Attendance: 48,151; Referee: Espen Eskås (Norway)

=== 2026 ===
26 March Friendly	Qatar	Cancelled	Serbia	Al Rayyan, Qatar
17:00 UTC+3		Report		Stadium: Jassim bin Hamad Stadium
Note: Cancelled due to the 2026 Iran war.

31 March Friendly	Qatar	Cancelled	Argentina	Lusail, Qatar
19:00 UTC+3				Stadium: Lusail Stadium
Note: Cancelled due to the 2026 Iran war.

21 May Friendly	Qatar	Cancelled	Sudan	Doha, Qatar
18:30 UTC+3		Report		Stadium: Abdullah bin Khalifa Stadium
Note: Cancelled as several players in the Sudan team contracted jaundice upon their arrival in Qatar.

28 May Friendly	Republic of Ireland	1–0	Qatar	Dublin, Ireland
19:45 UTC+1	Collins 5'	Report		Stadium: Aviva Stadium; Attendance: 28,981; Referee: Jamie Robinson (Northern Ireland)

6 June Friendly	El Salvador	0–0	Qatar	Los Angeles, United States
13:00 UTC−7		Report		Stadium: BMO Stadium; Attendance: 6,000; Referee: Rubiel Vazquez (United States)

13 June 2026 FIFA World Cup GS	Qatar	1–1	Switzerland	Santa Clara, United States
12:00 UTC−7	Muheim 90+4' (o.g.)	Report	Embolo 17' (pen.)	Stadium: Levi's Stadium; Attendance: 67,966; Referee: Saíd Martínez (Honduras)

18 June 2026 FIFA World Cup GS	Canada	6–0	Qatar	Vancouver, Canada
15:00 UTC−7	Larin 16'; David 29', 45+3', 90+2'; Saliba 64'; Manai 75' (o.g.)	Report		Stadium: BC Place; Attendance: 52,497; Referee: Cristián Garay (Chile)

24 June 2026 FIFA World Cup GS	Bosnia and Herzegovina	3–1	Qatar	Seattle, United States
12:00 UTC−7	Alajbegović 29'; Abunada 34' (o.g.); Mahmić 80'	Report	Al-Haydos 42'	Stadium: Lumen Field; Attendance: 66,925; Referee: Jesús Valenzuela (Venezuela)

24 September 2026 Gulf Cup GS	Qatar	2–0	Bahrain	Jeddah, Saudi Arabia
21:00 UTC+3	Khoukhi 61'; Al-Haydos 90+9' (pen.)	Report		Stadium: Prince Abdullah Al-Faisal Sports City Stadium; Attendance: 1,918; Referee: Khalid Al-Turais (Saudi Arabia)

27 September 2026 Gulf Cup GS	Yemen	0–1	Qatar	Jeddah, Saudi Arabia
18:55 UTC+3		Report	Abdurisag 64'	Stadium: King Abdullah Sports City Stadium; Attendance: 8,398; Referee: Adham Makhadmeh (Jordan)

30 September 2026 Gulf Cup GS	United Arab Emirates	1–1	Qatar	Jeddah, Saudi Arabia
20:30 UTC+3	Saleh 45+4'	Report	Ali 33'	Stadium: King Abdullah Sports City Stadium; Referee: Jalal Jayed (Morocco)

3 October 2026 Gulf Cup SF	Saudi Arabia	0–0 (a.e.t.) (3–2 p)	Qatar	Jeddah, Saudi Arabia
18:00 UTC+3		Report		Stadium: King Abdullah Sports City Stadium; Attendance: 51,342; Referee: João Pinheiro (Portugal)
	Penalties
	Al-Hamdan (penalty scored); Kanno (penalty scored); Al-Tambakti (penalty missed); Al-Buraikan (penalty missed); Ali (penalty scored)		(penalty missed) A. Ali; (penalty scored) Edmilson; (penalty missed) Gaber; (penalty missed) Khoukhi; (penalty scored) Al-Ganehi

13 November Friendly	Qatar	0–3	Australia	Doha, Qatar
17:45 UTC+3		Source	McGree 5'; Yengi 32'; Irankunda 40'	Stadium: Abdullah bin Khalifa Stadium; Referee: Yahya Al-Mulla (United Arab Emirates)

17 November Friendly	Qatar	0–1	South Korea	Doha, Qatar
17:00 UTC+3		Report	Oh Se-hun 43'	Stadium: Abdullah bin Khalifa Stadium; Referee: Mohamed Ebrahim Saad (Bahrain)

27 December Friendly	Saudi Arabia	Cancelled	Qatar	Al Khobar, Saudi Arabia
--:-- UTC+7

=== 2027 ===
5 January Friendly	Qatar	Cancelled	Vietnam	Doha, Qatar
--:-- UTC+7

December 2027 Asian Cup Group F	Qatar	v	Thailand	Riyadh, Saudi Arabia
--:--				Stadium: Imam Mohammed Ibn Saud University Stadium

December 2027 Asian Cup Group F	Indonesia	v	Qatar	Al Khobar, Saudi Arabia
--:--				Stadium: Aramco Stadium

=== 2028 ===
January 2027 Asian Cup Group F	Japan	v	Qatar	Riyadh, Saudi Arabia
--:--				Stadium: Imam Mohammed Ibn Saud University Stadium

== Coaching staff ==
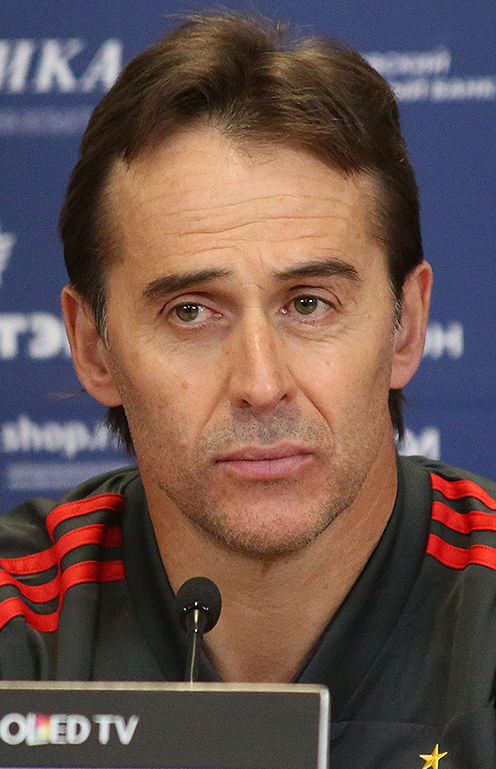
Julen Lopetegui, the current head coach of the Qatar national football team

Technical staff
Head coach	(Spain) Julen Lopetegui
Assistant coach	(Spain) Óscar Caro (Spain) Pablo Sanz
Official	(Qatar) Saad Al-Alawi
Fitness coach	(Spain) Borja De Alba
Technical coach	(Spain) Juan Ochoa
Goalkeeper coach	(Spain) Jose Luis Silva
Match analyst	(Spain) Alejandro Caro (Spain) Alvaro Reina (New Zealand) Gary Connell
Physiologist	(Italy) Fabio Massimo Francioni
Physiotherapist	(Qatar) Maqbool Al-Khelaifi (Republic of Ireland) Richie Partridge
Doctor	(Spain) Franchek Drobnic
Rehabilitation	(Spain) Cristian Martinez
Masseur	(Brazil) Jorge Luiz da Silva Pereira (Brazil) Jefferson Gomes
Administrative staff
Administrator	(Qatar) Mohamed Salem Al Etawi
Media coordinator	(Qatar) Ali Hassan Al-Salat

=== Coaching history ===
As of June 2026
Caretaker managers are listed in italics.

- (Egypt) Taha Toukhi (1969)
- (Sudan) Mohammed Hassan Kheiri (1969–1972)
- (Egypt) Helmi Hussein Mahmoud (1974)
- (England) Frank Wignall (1975–1977)
- (England) John Carrdone (1977–1978)
- (Sudan) Hassan Othman (1979)
- (Brazil) Evaristo (1979–1984)
- (Brazil) Ronald de Carvalho (1984)
- (Brazil) Evaristo (1984–1985)
- (Brazil) Dino Sani & (Brazil) Júlio Espinosa (1985–1986)
- (Brazil) Procópio Cardoso (1987–1988)
- (Soviet Union) Anatoliy Prokopenko (1988)
- (Qatar) Mohammed Daham (1988)
- (Brazil) Cabralzinho (1989)
- (Brazil) Dino Sani (1989–1990)
- (West Germany) Uli Maslo (1990)
- (Brazil) Dino Sani (1990)
- (Brazil) Evaristo (1992)
- (Brazil) Luís Fernandes (1992)
- (Brazil) Ivo Wortmann (1992)
- (Brazil) Sebastião Lapola (1992–1993)
- (Qatar) Abdul Mallalah (1993)
- (Scotland) Dave Mackay (1994–1995)
- (Denmark) Jørgen E. Larsen (1995–1996)
- (Netherlands) Jo Bonfrère (1996–1997)
- (Bosnia and Herzegovina) Džemal Hadžiabdić (1997–1998)
- (Brazil) Zé Mario (1998)
- (Brazil) Luiz Gonzaga Miliol (1998)
- (Qatar) Mohammed Daham (1988)
- (Netherlands) Jo Bonfrère (1998–1999)
- (Bosnia and Herzegovina) Džemal Hadžiabdić (1999–2001)
- (Brazil) Paulo Campos (2001)
- (France) Pierre Lechantre (2002–2003)
- (France) Philippe Troussier (2003–2004)
- (Qatar) Saeed Al Misnad (2004)
- (Bosnia and Herzegovina) Džemaludin Mušović (2004–2007)
- (Uruguay) Jorge Fossati (2007–2008)
- (France) Bruno Metsu (2008–2011)
- (Serbia) Milovan Rajevac (2011)
- (Brazil) Sebastião Lazaroni (2011–2012)
- (Brazil) Paulo Autuori (2012–2013)
- (Qatar) Fahad Thani (2013–2014)
- (Algeria) Djamel Belmadi (2014–2015)
- (Uruguay) José Daniel Carreño (2015–2016)
- (Uruguay) Jorge Fossati (2016–2017)
- (Spain) Félix Sánchez (2017–2022)
- (Portugal) Bruno Pinheiro (2022–2023)
- (Portugal) Carlos Queiroz (2023)
- (Spain) Tintín Márquez (2023–2024)
- (Spain) Luis García (2024–2025)
- (Spain) Julen Lopetegui (2025–present)

== Players ==
=== Current squad ===
The following 28 players are called up to the November 2026 friendlies against Australia and South Korea.
Caps and goals correct as of 17 November 2026, after the match against South Korea.

No.	Pos.	Player	Date of birth (age)	Caps	Goals	Club
	GK	Meshaal Barsham	14 February 1998 (age 28)	52	0	(Qatar Football Association) Al-Sadd
	GK	Mahmud Abunada	5 February 2000 (age 26)	13	0	(Qatar Football Association) Al-Rayyan
	GK	Salah Zakaria	24 April 1999 (age 27)	9	0	(Qatar Football Association) Al-Duhail
	GK	Shehab Ellethy	18 April 2000 (age 26)	1	0	(Qatar Football Association) Al-Shahaniya
	DF	Boualem Khoukhi	9 July 1990 (age 36)	137	22	(Qatar Football Association) Al-Sadd
	DF	Pedro Miguel	6 August 1990 (age 36)	118	3	(Qatar Football Association) Al-Sadd
	DF	Tarek Salman	5 December 1997 (age 28)	94	0	(Qatar Football Association) Al-Sadd
	DF	Homam Ahmed	25 August 1999 (age 27)	76	3	(Royal Spanish Football Federation) Valladolid
	DF	Bassam Al-Rawi	16 December 1997 (age 28)	72	2	(Qatar Football Association) Al-Duhail
	DF	Jassem Gaber	20 February 2002 (age 24)	41	1	(Qatar Football Association) Al-Rayyan
	DF	Sultan Al-Brake	7 April 1996 (age 30)	24	0	(Qatar Football Association) Al-Duhail
	DF	Ayoub Al-Oui	11 March 2005 (age 21)	13	0	(Qatar Football Association) Al-Gharafa
	DF	Issa Laye	22 December 1997 (age 28)	11	0	(Qatar Football Association) Al-Arabi
	DF	Yousef Aymen	21 March 1999 (age 27)	10	1	(Qatar Football Association) Al-Duhail
	DF	Niall Mason	10 January 1997 (age 29)	1	0	(Qatar Football Association) Qatar SC
	MF	Abdulaziz Hatem	28 October 1990 (age 36)	136	11	(Qatar Football Association) Al-Rayyan
	MF	Karim Boudiaf	16 September 1990 (age 36)	136	6	(Qatar Football Association) Al-Duhail
	MF	Assim Madibo	22 October 1996 (age 30)	58	0	(Qatar Football Association) Al-Duhail
	MF	Ahmed Fathy	25 January 1993 (age 33)	55	0	(Qatar Football Association) Al-Arabi
	MF	Mohamed Manai	25 October 2002 (age 24)	16	0	(Qatar Football Association) Al-Sadd
	MF	Ibrahim Al-Hassan	26 October 2005 (age 21)	12	2	(Qatar Football Association) Al-Rayyan
	FW	Hassan Al-Haydos (captain)	11 December 1990 (age 35)	194	43	(Qatar Football Association) Al-Sadd
	FW	Akram Afif	18 November 1996 (age 30)	144	41	(Qatar Football Association) Al-Sadd
	FW	Almoez Ali	19 August 1996 (age 30)	134	61	(Qatar Football Association) Al-Duhail
	FW	Ahmed Alaaeldin	31 January 1993 (age 33)	73	9	(Qatar Football Association) Al-Rayyan
	FW	Yusuf Abdurisag	6 August 1999 (age 27)	46	4	(Qatar Football Association) Al-Sadd
	FW	Edmilson Junior	19 August 1994 (age 32)	24	0	(Qatar Football Association) Al-Duhail
	FW	Ahmed Al-Ganehi	22 September 2000 (age 26)	18	1	(Qatar Football Association) Al-Rayyan
	FW	Hashim Ali	17 August 2000 (age 26)	7	0	(Qatar Football Association) Al-Sadd

=== Recent call-ups ===
The following players have also been called up to the Qatar squad within the last twelve months.

Pos.	Player	Date of birth (age)	Caps	Goals	Club	Latest call-up
GK	Fahad Younis	30 July 1994 (age 32)	0	0	(Qatar) Al-Sailiya	2026 FIFA World Cup ^{PRE}
DF	Lucas Mendes	3 July 1990 (age 36)	26	1	(Qatar) Al-Wakrah	2026 FIFA World Cup
DF	Al-Hashmi Al-Hussain	15 August 2003 (age 23)	9	0	(Qatar) Al-Arabi	2026 FIFA World Cup
DF	Rayyan Al-Ali	26 March 2006 (age 20)	1	0	(Qatar) Al-Gharafa	2026 FIFA World Cup ^{PRE}
DF	Eisa Palangi	21 February 1999 (age 27)	0	0	Qatar SC	Centralized training camp, March 2026
DF	Marwan Sherif	1 May 2006 (age 20)	0	0	(Qatar) Al-Arabi	Centralized training camp, March 2026
MF	Naif Al-Hadhrami	18 July 2001 (age 25)	14	0	(Qatar) Lusail	27th Arabian Gulf Cup
MF	Mohammed Waad	18 September 1999 (age 27)	49	0	(Qatar) Al-Shamal	2026 FIFA World Cup ^{PRE}
MF	Mostafa Meshaal	28 March 2001 (age 25)	26	2	(Belgium) Eupen	Centralized training camp, March 2026
MF	Khalid Ali Sabah	5 October 2001 (age 25)	2	0	(Qatar) Al-Sailiya	Centralized training camp, March 2026
MF	Anas Abweny	11 September 2004 (age 22)	0	0	(Qatar) Al-Sadd	Centralized training camp, March 2026
FW	Tahsin Jamshid	16 June 2006 (age 20)	4	0	(Qatar) Al-Duhail	27th Arabian Gulf Cup
FW	Mohammed Muntari	20 December 1993 (age 32)	67	16	(Qatar) Al-Gharafa	2026 FIFA World Cup
FW	Sebastián Soria	8 November 1983 (age 43)	126	39	Qatar SC	2026 FIFA World Cup ^{PRE}
FW	Mubarak Shanan	20 February 2004 (age 22)	2	0	(Qatar) Al-Duhail	2026 FIFA World Cup ^{PRE}
FW	Ahmed Al-Rawi	30 May 2004 (age 22)	9	3	Qatar SC	Centralized training camp, March 2026
FW	Mohamed Gouda	26 January 2005 (age 21)	7	0	(Qatar) Al-Arabi	Centralized training camp, March 2026
^{INJ} Player withdrew from the squad due to an injury.; ^{PRE} Preliminary squad.; ^{RET} Retired from the national team.; ^{SUS} Player is serving a suspension.; ^{WD} Player withdrew from the squad due to non-injury issue.

=== Naturalised players ===
While it is reasonably common for footballers to represent national teams other than their birth nations, the nature and extent of the practice for the Qatari team have been the subject of scrutiny and criticism at various points during the 21st century. In the early 1970s, shortly after the formation of the national team, the QFA revealed that it had naturalized its first players in a February 1976 telegram sent to FIFA: Ezzuldin Osman of Sudan, Hassan Mukhtar of Egypt and Ryad Murad of Lebanon. This practice of naturalizing Arabic-speaking foreigners to compete for the national team continued throughout the 20th century, albeit at a relatively slow rate. In 2004, FIFA cited the intention of three Brazilian players – Aílton, Dedé and Leandro – to play for the Qatar national team as the immediate trigger to their decision to tighten eligibility rules to ensure players have ties to the country they represent.

While Qatari authorities described it as a humanitarian effort and a way to provide competition for native Qatari players, critics claimed that it was merely another exploitative way of acquiring naturalized players, with Vice linking it to human rights abuses and the kafala system. The International Labour Organization (ILO) and Qatar announced the removal of the Kafala on 12 December 2016; the law came into effect in 2018. The reform took place between UN's International labor organization and the state of Qatar and was proven to be the part of many said assurances that nation has claimed for the 2022 World Cup. Though claimed by independent bodies of Qatar foundering to achieve the same, both sides had agreed to revise previous acts that had been taken. To make this all possible, the hosting country declared to pay compensation for the deaths of its migrant workers on 12 August 2022.

In the 2015 friendly against Algeria, six of the eleven players in the starting team were born outside of Qatar. Then-president of FIFA, Sepp Blatter, warned Qatar that FIFA would monitor their player selection to ensure that they were not relying too heavily on naturalised players. He made comparisons to the Qatar men's national handball team, referring to the team's selection for the 2015 World Men's Handball Championship as an "absurdity". The following year, naturalized players formed the backbone of the team and were sufficiently integral that head coach Jorge Fossati threatened to resign if they were removed.

The reliance on naturalised players has subsequently reduced, with only two members of the squad that beat Switzerland in a 2018 friendly being born outside Qatar. However, at the 2019 Asian Cup, amidst diplomatic tensions between the two countries, the United Arab Emirates Football Association lodged a formal complaint against Qatar, alleging that Almoez Ali and Bassam Al-Rawi were not eligible to play for them. These complaints were dismissed by the AFC.

Of the 26 players called up to the 2022 FIFA World Cup, 10 players were born outside of Qatar.

== Player records ==
As of 3 October 2026
Players in bold are still active with Qatar.

=== Most appearances ===
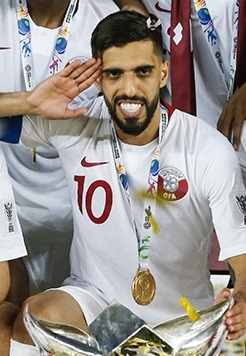
Hassan Al-Haydos is Qatar's most capped player with 193 appearances.

Rank	Player	Caps	Goals	Career
1	**Hassan Al-Haydos**	193	43	2008–present
2	**Akram Afif**	142	41	2015–present
3	**Abdelkarim Hassan**	136	15	2010–present
4	**Boualem Khoukhi**	135	22	2013–present
5	**Karim Boudiaf**	134	6	2013–present
5	**Abdulaziz Hatem**	134	11	2009–present
6	**Almoez Ali**	132	61	2016–present
8	**Sebastián Soria**	126	39	2007–present
9	**Pedro Miguel**	118	3	2007–present
10	Wesam Rizik	116	7	2001–2014

=== Top goalscorers ===
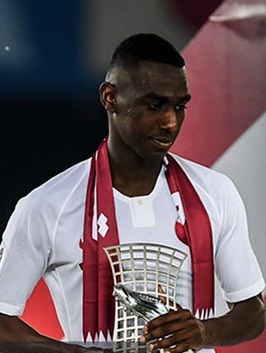
Almoez Ali is Qatar's top scorer with 61 goals.

Rank	Player	Goals	Caps	Ratio	Career
1	**Almoez Ali** (list)	61	132	0.46	2016–present
2	Mansour Muftah	48	84	0.57	1976–1993
3	**Hassan Al-Haydos**	43	193	0.22	2008–present
4	Mubarak Mustafa	41	106	0.39	1992–2004
4	**Akram Afif**	41	142	0.29	2015–present
6	**Sebastián Soria**	39	126	0.31	2007–present
7	Mohammed Salem Al-Enazi	34	69	0.49	1996–2003
8	Mahmoud Soufi	31	84	0.37	1988–1998
9	**Boualem Khoukhi**	22	135	0.16	2013–present
10	Khalfan Ibrahim	21	95	0.22	2006–2015

== Competitive record ==
Champions Runners-up Third place

Overview
Competition	1st Place	2nd Place	3rd Place	Total
AFC Asian Cup	2	0	0	2
FIFA Arab Cup	0	1	1	2
WAFF Championship	1	0	1	2
Arabian Gulf Cup	3	4	2	9
Total	6	5	3	14

=== FIFA World Cup ===
FIFA World Cup										Qualification					
Year	Result	Position	Pld	W	D	L	GF	GA	Squad	Pld	W	D	L	GF	GA
(Uruguay) 1930	Protectorate of the United Kingdom									Protectorate of the United Kingdom					
(Italy) 1934	Protectorate of the United Kingdom									Protectorate of the United Kingdom					
(France) 1938	Protectorate of the United Kingdom									Protectorate of the United Kingdom					
(Brazil) 1950	Protectorate of the United Kingdom									Protectorate of the United Kingdom					
(Switzerland) 1954	Protectorate of the United Kingdom									Protectorate of the United Kingdom					
(Sweden) 1958	Protectorate of the United Kingdom									Protectorate of the United Kingdom					
(Chile) 1962	Not a FIFA member									Not a FIFA member					
(England) 1966	Did not enter									Did not enter					
(Mexico) 1970	Did not enter									Did not enter					
(West Germany) 1974	Withdrew from qualifiers									Withdrew from qualifiers					
(Argentina) 1978	Did not qualify									4	1	0	3	3	9
(Spain) 1982	Did not qualify									4	2	0	2	5	3
(Mexico) 1986	Did not qualify									4	2	0	2	6	3
(Italy) 1990	Did not qualify									11	4	6	1	12	8
(United States) 1994	Did not qualify									8	5	1	2	22	8
(France) 1998	Did not qualify									11	6	1	4	21	10
(South Korea) (Japan) 2002	Did not qualify									14	7	4	3	24	13
(Germany) 2006	Did not qualify									6	3	0	3	16	8
(South Africa) 2010	Did not qualify									16	6	4	6	16	20
(Brazil) 2014	Did not qualify									16	5	5	6	19	20
(Russia) 2018	Did not qualify									18	9	1	8	37	19
(Qatar) 2022	Group stage	32nd	3	0	0	3	1	7	Squad	8	7	1	0	18	1
(Canada) (Mexico) (United States) 2026	Group stage	41st	3	0	1	2	2	10	Squad	18	10	3	5	38	29
(Spain) (Portugal) (Morocco) 2030	To be determined									To be determined					
(Saudi Arabia) 2034	To be determined									To be determined					
Total:2/16	Group stage	32nd	6	0	1	5	3	17		138	67	26	45	236	150

=== AFC Asian Cup ===
AFC Asian Cup record										Qualification record					
Year	Result	Position	Pld	W	D	L	GF	GA	Squad	Pld	W	D	L	GF	GA
(Hong Kong) 1956	Protectorate of the United Kingdom									Protectorate of the United Kingdom					
(South Korea) 1960	Protectorate of the United Kingdom									Protectorate of the United Kingdom					
(Israel) 1964	Protectorate of the United Kingdom									Protectorate of the United Kingdom					
(Iran) 1968	Protectorate of the United Kingdom									Protectorate of the United Kingdom					
(Thailand) 1972	Protectorate of the United Kingdom									Protectorate of the United Kingdom					
(Iran) 1976	Did not qualify									6	2	1	3	5	8
(Kuwait) 1980	Group stage	8th	4	1	1	2	3	8	Squad	4	3	1	0	10	2
(Singapore) 1984	Group stage	5th	4	1	2	1	3	3	Squad	4	3	0	1	11	1
(Qatar) 1988	Group stage	5th	4	2	0	2	7	6	Squad	Qualified as hosts					
(Japan) 1992	Group stage	6th	3	0	2	1	3	4	Squad	2	2	0	0	8	2
(United Arab Emirates) 1996	Did not qualify									4	2	0	2	5	4
(Lebanon) 2000	Quarter-finals	8th	4	0	3	1	3	5	Squad	4	3	1	0	11	3
(China) 2004	Group stage	14th	3	0	1	2	2	4	Squad	6	3	2	1	10	7
(Indonesia) (Malaysia) (Thailand) (Vietnam) 2007	Group stage	14th	3	0	2	1	3	4	Squad	6	5	0	1	14	4
(Qatar) 2011	Quarter-finals	5th	4	2	0	2	7	5	Squad	Qualified as hosts					
(Australia) 2015	Group stage	13th	3	0	0	3	2	7	Squad	6	4	1	1	13	2
(United Arab Emirates) 2019	Champions	1st	7	7	0	0	19	1	Squad	8	7	0	1	29	4
(Qatar) 2023	Champions	1st	7	6	1	0	14	5	Squad	8	7	1	0	18	1
(Saudi Arabia) 2027	Qualified									6	5	1	0	18	3
Total	2 Titles	12/14	46	19	12	15	66	52	—	64	46	8	10	163	40

AFC Asian Cup history
First match	Qatar 2–1 United Arab Emirates (17 September 1980; Kuwait City, Kuwait)
Biggest win	North Korea 0–6 Qatar (13 January 2019; Al Ain, United Arab Emirates)
Biggest defeat	Kuwait 4–0 Qatar (25 September 1980; Kuwait City, Kuwait)
Best result	Champions (2019, 2023)
Worst result	Group stage (1980, 1984, 1988, 1992, 2004, 2007, 2015)

=== FIFA Arab Cup ===
FIFA Arab Cup record
Year	Result	Pld	W	D	L	GF	GA
(Lebanon) 1963	Did not enter						
(Kuwait) 1964	Did not enter						
(Iraq) 1966	Did not enter						
(Saudi Arabia) 1985	Fourth place	4	1	2	1	3	2
(Jordan) 1988	Did not enter						
(Syria) 1992	Did not enter						
(Qatar) 1998	Runners-up	4	3	0	1	7	5
(Kuwait) 2002	Did not enter						
(Saudi Arabia) 2012	Did not enter						
(Qatar) 2021	Third place	6	4	1	1	12	3
(Qatar) 2025	Group stage	3	0	1	2	1	5
Total	4/11	17	8	4	5	23	15

=== Copa América ===
Qatar was the second team from outside the Americas to participate in the Copa América, and were invited for the first time in 2019.

Copa América record
Year	Result	Position	Pld	W	D*	L	GF	GA
(Brazil) 2019	Group stage	10th	3	0	1	2	2	5
Total	Group stage	10th	3	0	1	2	2	5

=== CONCACAF Gold Cup ===
Qatar was the second team from Asia to participate in the CONCACAF Gold Cup after South Korea, and were invited for the first time in 2021.

CONCACAF Gold Cup record
Year	Result	Position	Pld	W	D*	L	GF	GA
(United States) 2021	Semi-finals	3rd	5	3	1	1	12	6
(Canada) (United States) 2023	Quarter-finals	8th	4	1	1	2	3	7
Total	Semi-finals	2/28	9	4	2	3	15	13

=== Arabian Gulf Cup ===
Arabian Gulf Cup record
Year	Result	Pld	W	D	L	GF	GA
(Bahrain) 1970	Fourth place	3	0	1	2	4	7
(Saudi Arabia) 1972	Fourth place	3	0	0	3	0	10
(Kuwait) 1974	Semi-finals	3	1	0	2	5	4
(Qatar) 1976	Third place	6	4	1	1	11	6
(Iraq) 1979	Fifth place	6	2	1	3	4	13
(United Arab Emirates) 1982	Fifth place	5	2	0	3	5	4
(Oman) 1984	Runners-up	7	4	1	2	10	6
(Bahrain) 1986	Fourth place	6	2	2	2	7	8
(Saudi Arabia) 1988	Sixth place	6	1	2	3	4	8
(Kuwait) 1990	Runners-up	4	1	2	1	4	4
(Qatar) 1992	Champions	5	4	0	1	8	1
(United Arab Emirates) 1994	Fourth place	5	1	1	3	6	8
(Oman) 1996	Runners-up	5	3	1	1	9	5
(Bahrain) 1998	Sixth place	5	0	3	2	3	8
(Saudi Arabia) 2002	Runners-up	5	4	0	1	7	4
(Kuwait) 2003–04	Third place	6	2	3	1	5	3
(Qatar) 2004	Champions	5	3	2	0	10	7
(United Arab Emirates) 2007	Group stage	3	0	1	2	2	4
(Oman) 2009	Semi-finals	4	1	2	1	2	2
(Yemen) 2010	Group stage	3	1	1	1	3	3
(Bahrain) 2013	Group stage	3	1	0	2	3	5
(Saudi Arabia) 2014	Champions	5	2	3	0	6	3
(Kuwait) 2017–18	Group stage	3	1	1	1	6	3
(Qatar) 2019	Semi-finals	4	2	0	2	11	5
(Iraq) 2023	Semi-finals	4	1	1	2	5	5
(Kuwait) 2024–25	Group stage	3	0	2	1	3	4
(Saudi Arabia) 2026	Semi-finals	4	2	2	0	4	1
Total	27/27	118	45	31	42	144	137

The Gulf Cup has been played on a bi-annual basis since 1970. The tournament has changed since the first edition from a round-robin basis to a knockout tournament in the latter years. Notably, the 2000 edition was cancelled and the 2003 and 2010 were moved due to congested fixture lists with other tournaments, such as the Asian Cup.

=== Arab Games ===
Arab Games record
Year	Round	Result	Pld	W	D	L	GF	GA
1953–1997	Did not enter							
(Jordan) 1999	First group stage	10th	2	0	0	2	0	4
(Egypt) 2007	Did not enter							
(Qatar) 2011	Group stage	6th	2	0	2	0	2	2
(Algeria) 2023	Did not enter							
Total	2/10	6th	4	0	2	2	2	6

=== WAFF Championship ===
WAFF Championship record
Year	Result	Pld	W	D*	L	GF	GA
(Jordan) 2000	Did not enter						
(Syria) 2002	Did not enter						
(Iran) 2004	Did not enter						
(Jordan) 2007	Did not enter						
(Iran) 2008	Semi-finals	3	1	0	2	2	9
(Jordan) 2010	Did not enter						
(Kuwait) 2012	Did not enter						
(Qatar) 2013	Champions	4	4	0	0	10	1
(Iraq) 2019	Did not enter						
(Oman) 2026	To be determined						
Total	2/10	7	5	0	2	12	10

=== Olympic Games ===
Summer Olympics record									Qualification record					
Year	Result	Position	M	W	D	L	GF	GA	M	W	D	L	GF	GA
(Canada) 1976	Did not enter								Did not enter					
(Soviet Union) 1980	Did not enter								Did not enter					
(United States) 1984	Group stage	15th	3	0	1	2	2	5	10	6	4	0	13	5
(South Korea) 1988	Did not qualify								8	2	3	3	6	9
1992 – present	See Qatar national under-23 team								See Qatar national under-23 team					
Total	Group stage	1/17	3	0	1	2	2	5	18	8	7	3	19	14

=== Asian Games ===
Asian Games record
Year	Round	Pld	W	D	L	GF	GA
1951–1974	Did not enter						
(Thailand) 1978	Group stage	3	0	1	2	3	7
(India) 1982	Did not enter						
(South Korea) 1986	Group stage	3	0	2	1	2	3
(China) 1990	Did not enter						
(Japan) 1994	Group stage	3	0	3	0	5	5
(Thailand) 1998	Quarter-finals	6	4	1	1	9	4
2002–present	See Qatar national under-23 football team						
Total	4/13	15	4	7	4	19	19

== Head-to-head record ==
Updated on 3 October 2026 after the match against Saudi Arabia.

Positive Record Neutral Record Negative Record

Team	Pld	W	D	L	GF	GA	GD	Confederation
Afghanistan	9	7	2	0	31	4	27	AFC
Albania	3	1	0	2	3	5	−2	UEFA
Algeria	6	1	1	4	3	10	−7	CAF
Andorra	1	1	0	0	1	0	1	UEFA
Argentina	2	0	0	2	0	5	−5	CONMEBOL
Australia	5	1	1	3	2	10	−8	AFC
Azerbaijan	4	1	2	1	6	6	0	UEFA
Bahrain	42	9	20	13	38	40	−2	AFC
Bangladesh	7	5	2	0	18	3	17	AFC
Belgium	1	0	0	1	0	2	−2	UEFA
Bhutan	2	2	0	0	18	0	18	AFC
Bosnia and Herzegovina	3	1	1	1	4	4	0	UEFA
Brazil	2	0	0	2	1	8	−7	CONMEBOL
Bulgaria	2	1	0	1	4	4	0	UEFA
Burkina Faso	1	0	1	0	2	2	0	CAF
Cambodia	1	1	0	0	3	0	0	AFC
Canada	2	0	0	2	0	8	–8	CONCACAF
Chile	1	0	1	0	2	2	0	CONMEBOL
China	20	7	5	8	17	23	−6	AFC
Colombia	1	0	0	1	0	1	−1	CONMEBOL
Congo DR	1	0	1	0	2	2	0	CAF
Costa Rica	1	0	1	0	1	1	0	CONCACAF
Croatia	1	0	0	1	2	3	−1	UEFA
Curaçao	1	0	0	1	1	2	−1	CONCACAF
Czech Republic	1	0	0	1	0	1	−1	UEFA
Denmark	1	0	0	1	0	1	−1	UEFA
Ecuador	4	1	1	2	6	8	–2	CONMEBOL
El Salvador	3	2	1	0	4	2	2	CONCACAF
Egypt	8	2	2	4	7	18	−11	CAF
Estonia	2	2	0	0	5	0	5	UEFA
Finland	4	1	3	0	4	3	1	UEFA
Georgia	1	0	0	1	1	2	−1	UEFA
Ghana	2	1	0	1	3	6	–3	CAF
Greece	1	0	0	1	0	1	−1	UEFA
Grenada	1	1	0	0	4	0	4	CONCACAF
Guatemala	1	1	0	0	2	0	2	CONCACAF
Haiti	2	0	0	2	1	3	−2	CONCACAF
Honduras	3	2	1	0	4	1	3	CONCACAF
Hong Kong	7	7	0	0	16	2	14	AFC
Hungary	3	0	1	2	2	8	−6	UEFA
Iceland	2	0	2	0	3	3	0	UEFA
India	6	4	1	1	13	3	10	AFC
Indonesia	9	6	2	1	23	10	13	AFC
Iran	26	5	5	16	20	45	−25	AFC
Iraq	34	9	10	15	34	41	−7	AFC
Ivory Coast	1	0	0	1	1	6	−5	CAF
Jamaica	2	1	1	0	3	2	1	CONCACAF
Japan	10	3	4	3	13	12	1	AFC
Jordan	24	13	5	6	35	19	14	AFC
Kazakhstan	4	2	0	2	6	4	2	UEFA
Kenya	1	0	0	1	1	2	−1	CAF
North Korea	14	4	6	4	26	18	8	AFC
South Korea	12	4	2	6	15	20	−5	AFC
Kuwait	39	14	4	21	46	59	−13	AFC
Kyrgyzstan	4	2	1	1	5	4	1	AFC
Laos	2	2	0	0	11	1	10	AFC
Latvia	1	1	0	0	3	1	2	UEFA
Lebanon	15	11	3	1	37	4	33	AFC
Libya	4	2	1	1	4	2	2	CAF
Liechtenstein	1	0	0	1	1	2	−1	UEFA
Luxembourg	2	1	1	0	2	1	1	UEFA
North Macedonia	3	1	1	1	2	2	0	UEFA
Malaysia	7	4	3	0	11	3	8	AFC
Maldives	3	3	0	0	9	0	9	AFC
Mali	1	0	1	0	0	0	0	CAF
Malta	2	0	0	2	0	4	−4	UEFA
Mauritius	1	1	0	0	3	0	3	CAF
Mexico	1	1	0	0	1	0	1	CONCACAF
Moldova	1	0	1	0	1	1	0	UEFA
Morocco	3	0	2	1	2	3	−1	CAF
Myanmar	1	0	1	0	2	2	0	AFC
Netherlands	1	0	0	1	0	2	−2	UEFA
New Zealand	1	1	0	0	3	2	1	OFC
Nicaragua	1	1	0	0	2	1	1	CONCACAF
Northern Ireland	1	0	1	0	1	1	0	UEFA
Norway	1	0	0	1	1	6	−5	UEFA
Oman	36	20	9	7	62	30	32	AFC
Pakistan	1	1	0	0	5	0	5	AFC
Palestine	13	8	2	3	15	9	6	AFC
Panama	3	1	1	1	5	8	−3	CONCACAF
Paraguay	4	1	2	1	5	6	−1	CONMEBOL
Peru	1	0	0	1	0	2	−2	CONMEBOL
Philippines	1	1	0	0	5	0	5	AFC
Portugal	2	0	0	2	1	6	−5	UEFA
Republic of Ireland	3	0	1	2	1	6	–5	UEFA
Russia	5	1	2	2	7	12	−5	UEFA
Saudi Arabia	41	7	16	18	29	53	−24	AFC
Scotland	1	0	0	1	0	1	−1	UEFA
Senegal	1	0	0	1	1	3	–2	CAF
Serbia	3	1	0	2	3	8	–5	UEFA
Singapore	14	12	1	1	32	5	27	AFC
Slovenia	3	1	1	1	2	4	−2	UEFA
Sri Lanka	3	3	0	0	9	0	9	AFC
Sudan	4	3	1	0	9	2	7	CAF
Sweden	2	0	1	1	2	3	−1	UEFA
Switzerland	3	1	2	0	3	2	1	UEFA
Syria	13	5	4	4	19	19	0	AFC
Tajikistan	5	4	0	1	11	3	8	AFC
Thailand	14	6	4	4	18	16	2	AFC
Tunisia	1	1	0	0	1	0	0	CAF
Turkey	1	0	0	1	1	2	−1	UEFA
Turkmenistan	3	3	0	0	8	1	7	AFC
United Arab Emirates	37	15	11	11	51	41	7	AFC
United States	1	0	0	1	0	1	−1	CONCACAF
Uzbekistan	16	4	3	10	17	30	−13	AFC
Vietnam	6	3	1	2	14	5	9	AFC
Wales	1	0	0	1	0	1	−1	UEFA
Yemen	10	9	1	0	27	3	24	AFC
Zimbabwe	2	0	0	2	1	4	−3	CAF
Total	659	267	167	268	928	807	+121	FIFA

== Honours ==
=== Continental ===
- AFC Asian Cup
  - Champions (2): 2019, 2023

=== Regional ===
- Arab Cup / FIFA Arab Cup^{1}
  - Runners-up (1): 1998
  - Third place (1): 2021
- Arabian Gulf Cup
  - Champions (3): 1992, 2004, 2014
  - Runners-up (4): 1984, 1990, 1996, 2002
  - Third place (2): 1976, 2003–04
- WAFF Championship
  - Champions (1): 2013

=== Friendly ===
- International Friendship Championship (1): 2018

=== Awards ===
- AFC Asian Cup Fair Play Award (1): 2023
- Arabian Gulf Cup Fair Play Award (1): 2019

=== Summary ===
Competition	1st place, gold medalist(s)	2nd place, silver medalist(s)	3rd place, bronze medalist(s)	Total
AFC Asian Cup	2	0	0	2
FIFA Arab Cup	0	0	1	1
Total	2	0	1	3

== See also ==
- Sport in Qatar
- Football in Qatar
- Qatar Football Association
- Qatar national under-23 football team (Qatar Olympic team)
- Qatar national under-20 football team
- Qatar national under-17 football team

== Notes ==
1. Official regional competition organized and recognized by FIFA since 2021. Previous editions were organized by UAFA.
