= 2019 AFC Asian Cup final =

Association football match

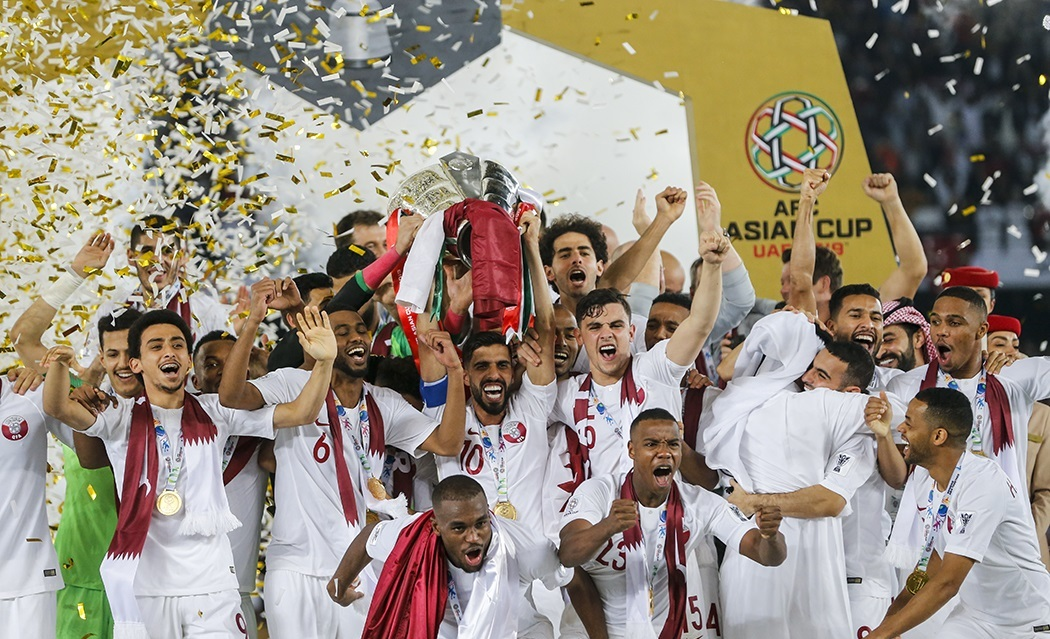
- The Qatar team celebrating with the Asian Cup trophy after winning the final
- Event: 2019 AFC Asian Cup
Japan	Qatar
(Japan)	(Qatar)
1	3
- Date: 1 February 2019
- Venue: Zayed Sports City Stadium, Abu Dhabi
- Man of the Match: Akram Afif (Qatar)
- Referee: Ravshan Irmatov (Uzbekistan)
- Attendance: 36,776
- Weather: Clear; 24 °C (75 °F); 53% humidity

The 2019 AFC Asian Cup final was a football match which determined the winner of the 2019 AFC Asian Cup, the 17th edition of the AFC Asian Cup, a quadrennial tournament contested by the men's national teams of the member associations of the Asian Football Confederation. The match was held at the Zayed Sports City Stadium in Abu Dhabi, United Arab Emirates, on 1 February 2019 and was contested by Japan and Qatar.

Japan had won in each of its four previous AFC Asian Cup finals, while Qatar were playing in their first, which they managed to reach without conceding a goal in the prior six matches. Qatar won the final 3–1 for their first AFC Asian Cup title, scoring twice in the first half and earning a late penalty in the second half. For Japan, this was their first defeat in an Asian Cup final. Qatari fans were largely unable to attend the tournament due to the Qatar diplomatic crisis.

== Venue ==
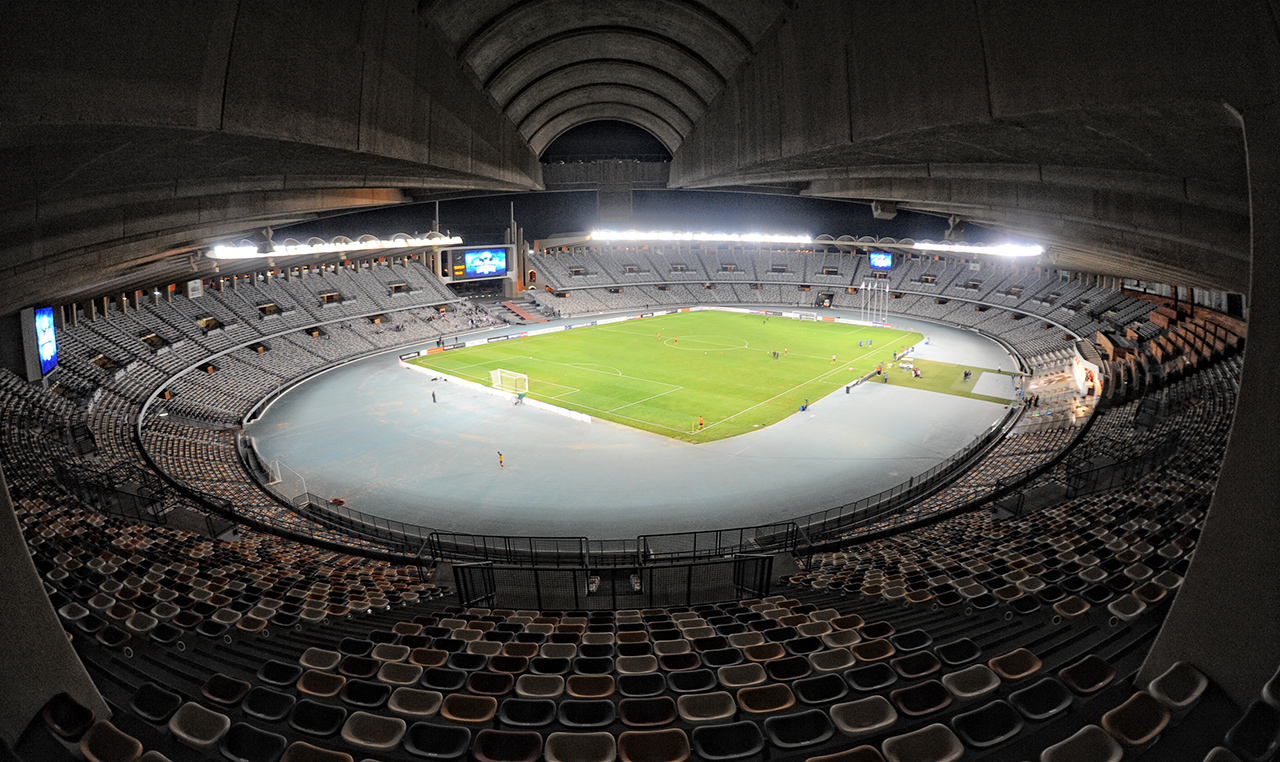
The Zayed Sports City Stadium in Abu Dhabi hosted the final

Zayed Sports City Stadium in Abu Dhabi, the largest stadium in the United Arab Emirates, hosted the Asian Cup final. The 43,000-seat stadium was built in 1980 and is primarily used by the Emirati national football team. Zayed Sports City was the host of the 1996 AFC Asian Cup final and 2003 FIFA World Youth Championship final, as well as several FIFA Club World Cup finals, most recently in 2018. The Dubai Roads and Transport Authority solicited independent bids in 2015 to build a 60,000-seat stadium to host the Asian Cup final, but Zayed Sports City Stadium was announced in 2017 as the venue for the opening match and final.

== Route to the final ==
Japan
Round
Qatar
Opponents
Result
Group stage
Opponents
Result
Turkmenistan
3–2
Match 1
Lebanon
2–0
Oman
1–0
Match 2
North Korea
6–0
Uzbekistan
2–1
Match 3
Saudi Arabia
2–0
Group F winners

Pos	Team	Pld	Pts
1	Japan	3	9
2	Uzbekistan	3	6
3	Oman	3	3
4	Turkmenistan	3	0

Source: AFC
Final standings
Group E winners

Pos	Team	Pld	Pts
1	Qatar	3	9
2	Saudi Arabia	3	6
3	Lebanon	3	3
4	North Korea	3	0

Source: AFC
Opponents
Result
Knockout stage
Opponents
Result
Saudi Arabia
1–0
Round of 16
Iraq
1–0
Vietnam
1–0
Quarter-finals
South Korea
1–0
Iran
3–0
Semi-finals
United Arab Emirates
4–0

=== Japan ===
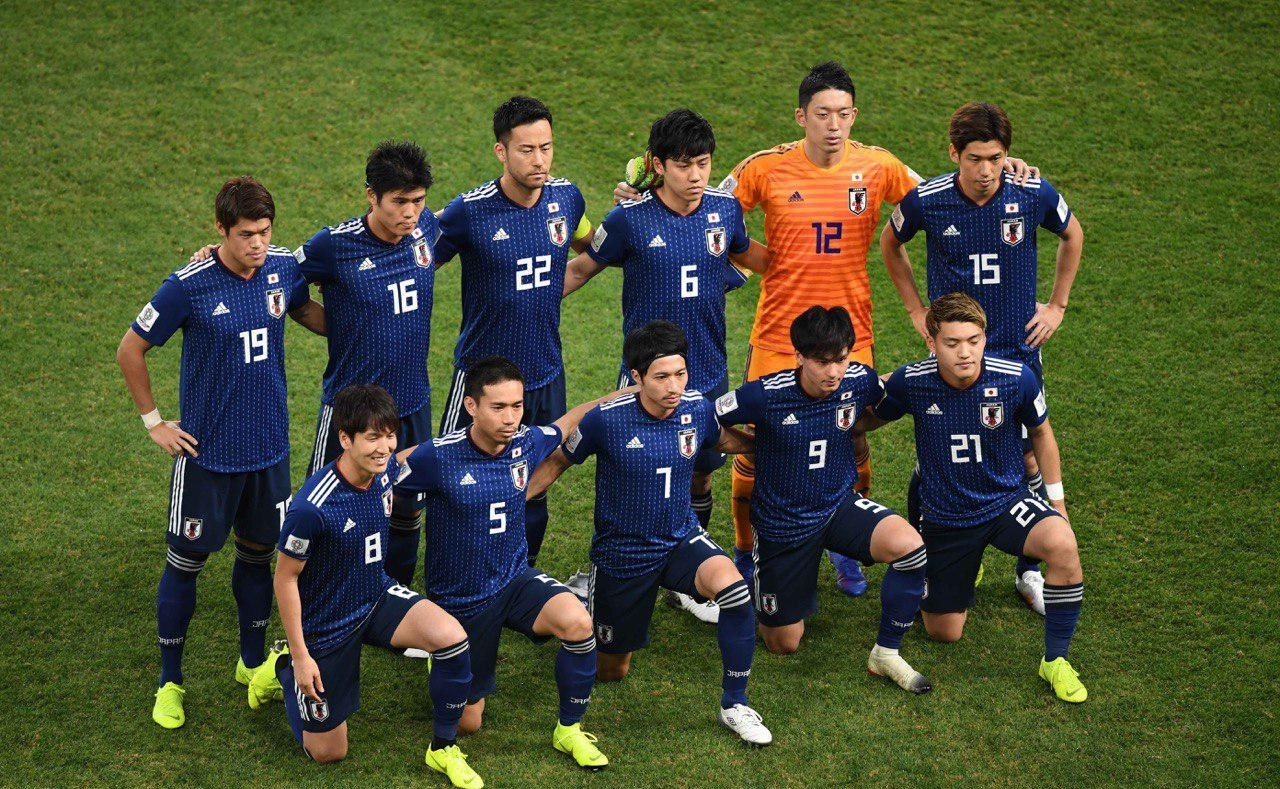
Japan's starting lineup for the semi-final match against Iran

Japan is the most successful nation at the Asian Cup, having won it a record four times—most recently in 2011. They qualified for the 2019 tournament by topping Group E with an undefeated record of seven wins and one draw, scoring 27 goals and conceding none. After the team reached the round of 16 during the 2018 FIFA World Cup, head coach Akira Nishino was replaced by Hajime Moriyasu, who had assisted Nishino and served as coach of the under-23 team preparing for the 2020 Summer Olympics. Moriyasu elected to exclude several veteran players in his Asian Cup squad, including midfielder Shinji Kagawa and striker Shinji Okazaki, with the goal of exposing younger, in-form players to international competition. Under Moriyasu's tenure, Japan was undefeated in five matches before the start of the Asian Cup.

In their opening match of the Asian Cup, Japan faced Turkmenistan and conceded a goal in the 26th minute, a long-range strike by Arslanmyrat Amanow, and entered halftime trailing 1–0. Japan took the lead in the second half with a brace from Yuya Osako, who scored in the 56th and 60th minutes, and added a third goal by Ritsu Dōan eleven minutes later. The lead was cut back to 3–2 by a penalty kick scored in the 78th minute by Ahmet Ataýew. Moriyasu acknowledged that the team struggled in the match against Turkmenistan and praised their performance before adding that they would need to improve in order to advance from the group stage. In their second match against Oman, Japan had several early chances that they failed to convert into goals before earning a penalty in the 28th minute for a tackle on Genki Haraguchi, who scored. The 1–0 win, which came with Oman being denied a penalty for an alleged handball in the first half, saw Japan qualify for the knockout round. Moriyasu fielded an entirely new starting lineup, save for forward Koya Kitagawa, for the final group stage match against Uzbekistan. Japan and clinched a first-place finish in Group F through a come-from-behind 2–1 victory over Uzbekistan. After conceding a goal in the 40th minute, Japan responded with a header scored by Yoshinori Muto in the 43rd minute and a long-distance strike by Tsukasa Shiotani in the 58th minute.

The Samurai Blue faced Saudi Arabia in the round of 16 and played defensively, fielding a lineup similar to their first two group stage matches. Japan advanced with a 1–0 victory over the Saudis on a 20th-minute header scored by Takehiro Tomiyasu and protected the lead against the majority of possession and shots held by the Saudis. The quarter-finals marked the debut of the video assistant referee (VAR) system at the Asian Cup and was used in the match between Japan and Vietnam, calling back a goal in the 25th minute for a handball and awarding Japan a penalty kick in the 57th minute, which was scored by Ritsu Dōan to give the Samurai Blue a 1–0 win. Moriyasu defended the team's results after receiving criticism over the team's style of play, which relied on one-goal margins in the group stage and knockout rounds to reach the semi-finals. Playing in the semi-finals against the top-ranked Iranian team, who had yet to concede a goal, the two teams were kept to a scoreless draw in the first half. Japan made several halftime adjustments to its attack that produced a 3–0 victory and advancement to their fifth Asian Cup final. Yuya Osako netted a brace with a header in the 56th minute and a penalty kick in the 67th minute that was awarded by VAR for a handball; Genki Haraguchi then added a third goal in stoppage time to seal the team's win.

=== Qatar ===
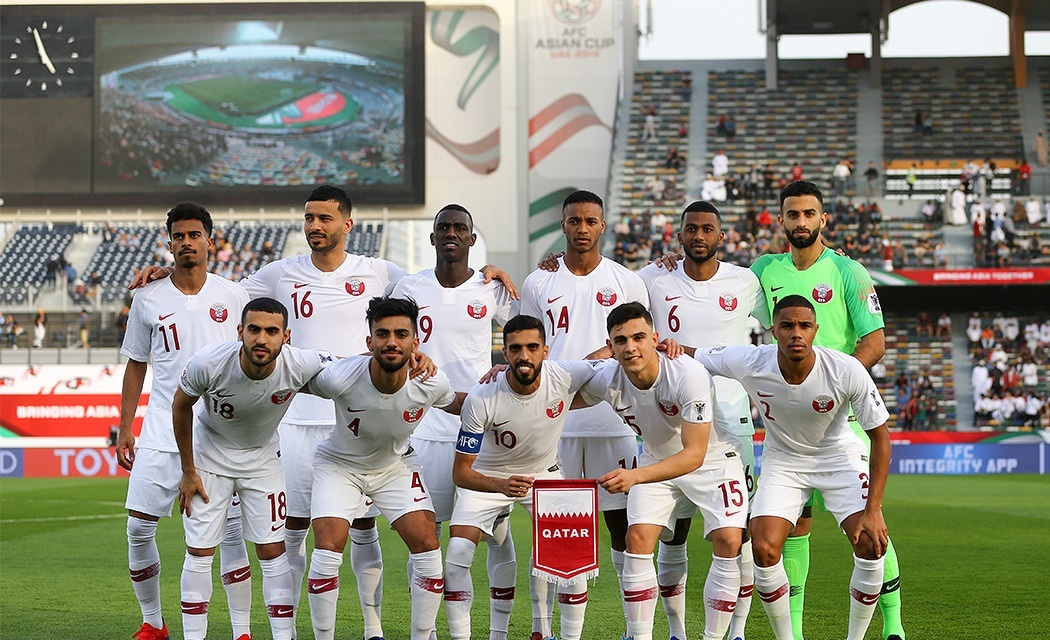
Qatar's starting lineup for the quarter-final match against South Korea

Qatar has participated in nine previous editions of the Asian Cup, advancing twice from the group stage in 2000 and 2011 before being eliminated in the quarter-finals. The country was selected to host the 2022 FIFA World Cup and earned a qualification berth, prompting the Qataris to begin preparing the national team for the world stage. Former Barcelona youth coach Félix Sánchez was named the manager of the U-23 and senior national teams in 2017, cultivating an attack-oriented style and utilizing young talents who had emerged since the World Cup announcement.

In the second round of the Asian Cup qualification tournament, Qatar placed first with a record of seven wins and one loss—including a 15–0 victory over Bhutan that broke their record for their largest margin of victory. While their performance in the second round qualified them for the Asian Cup, Qatar failed to clinch a berth for the 2018 FIFA World Cup, placing last in its third-round group with seven losses in ten matches. Sánchez called up a young squad, including eleven members aged younger than 22, that was primarily pooled from the domestic league's Al-Sadd and Al-Duhail as well as members of the team who had won the 2014 AFC U-19 Championship under his tenure. In two warm-up friendlies, Qatar earned an upset 1–0 victory over Switzerland and drew 2–2 with Iceland. The team was affected by the ongoing diplomatic dispute between Qatar and a coalition of Middle Eastern and Muslim nations led by Saudi Arabia and including hosts United Arab Emirates, causing them to take indirect flights and being denied access to federation officials and journalists.

Qatar were drawn into Group E and opened their Asian Cup campaign against Lebanon, winning 2–0 on second-half goals by center-back Bassam Al-Rawi and forward Almoez Ali. It was the first time that Qatar had won an Asian Cup match hosted in another country. In their second match, facing North Korea in front of an announced attendance of 452 spectators at Khalifa bin Zayed Stadium, Qatar won 6–0 with four goals by Ali to reach the knockout round, which became Qatar's largest ever victory in their Asian Cup history. The final group stage match against Saudi Arabia was nicknamed the "Blockade Derby", referencing the land, air, and sea blockade, and was won 2–0 by Qatar with two goals scored by Almoez Ali to top their group comfortably.

The team faced Iraq in the round of 16 and won 1–0, with the lone goal of the match coming from a free kick scored by Iraqi-born Bassam Al-Rawi in the 62nd minute. Qatar then played against 2015 runners-up South Korea, which had managed to eliminate Germany in the 2018 FIFA World Cup earlier before, in the quarter-finals and created the biggest shock in the tournament, a 1–0 win on a goal from Abdulaziz Hatem in the 78th minute, setting up a semi-finals match against hosts United Arab Emirates. The semi-final, dubbed the second installment of the "Blockade Derby", was played in front of 38,646 spectators at the Mohammed bin Zayed Stadium in Abu Dhabi, where hostile Emirati supporters threw sandals and water bottles at Qatari players. Boualem Khoukhi scored the opening goal for Qatar in the 22nd minute and was followed by Almoez Ali, who scored his eighth goal of the tournament in the 37th minute and tied the record set by Ali Daei for Iran in 1996. A goal by Hassan Al-Haydos in the 80th minute and substitute Hamid Ismail in stoppage time gave Qatar a 4–0 win to help them reach their first Asian Cup final. Qatar also became the second team to advance to the final without conceding a goal, following South Korea's run in 2015.

== Pre-match ==
=== Officials ===
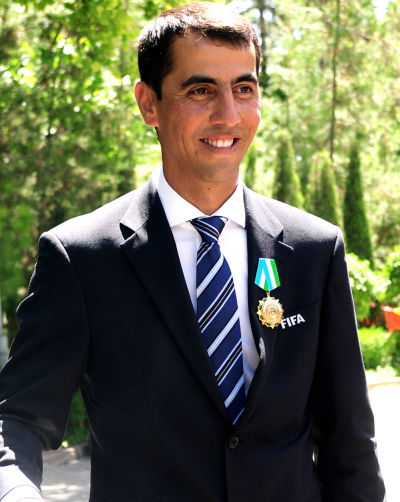
Ravshan Irmatov was the head referee at the final.

Uzbek referee Ravshan Irmatov was selected to lead the officiating team for the final, which was announced by the AFC on 30 January 2019. He previously officiated at three FIFA World Cups, the 2012 Summer Olympics, FIFA Club World Cup, and the FIFA Confederations Cup. The final is Irmatov's fifth match as referee during the tournament, having officiated two group stage matches and two knockout matches. His compatriots Abdukhamidullo Rasulov and Jakhongir Saidov were chosen as assistant referees, while Chinese referee Ma Ning was the fourth official. Italian Paolo Valeri was named the video assistant referee, presiding over the first use of the technology in the final of the Asian Cup. Muhammad Taqi of Singapore and Chris Beath of Australia were the assistant video assistant referees for the match.

=== Qatari players' eligibility ===
On 30 January 2019, soon after the hosts lost to Qatar in the semi-finals, the United Arab Emirates Football Association (UAEFA) lodged a formal appeal to the AFC over the eligibility of Sudanese-born striker Almoez Ali and Iraqi-born defender Bassam Al-Rawi, claiming that they did not qualify to play for Qatar. The appeal was filed on residency grounds per Article 7 of the FIFA statutes, which states a player is eligible to play for a representative team if he has "lived continuously for at least five years after reaching the age of 18 on the territory of the relevant association". It was alleged by the UAEFA that Ali and Al-Rawi had not lived continuously in Qatar for at least five years over the age of 18, although the players claimed that their mothers were born in Qatar. On 1 February 2019, hours prior to the final, the AFC Disciplinary and Ethics Committee ruled in favour of Qatar national team and dismissed the protest lodged by the UAEFA.

== Match ==
=== Summary ===
The match kicked off at 18:00 local time in Abu Dhabi at Zayed Sports City Stadium, in front of an announced attendance of 36,776 spectators, including several thousand Omanis. Japan began the match with two set piece chances, but neither was able to provide a scoring chance. Qatar's Almoez Ali opened the scoring in the 12th minute with a bicycle kick from 15 yards (14 m) after juggling a ball received from Akram Afif. With his ninth goal of the tournament, Ali took the record for most goals scored during an Asian Cup that was previously held by Iranian Ali Daei. Abdulaziz Hatem scored Qatar's next goal in the 27th minute, shooting from 25 yards (75 ft) past Japanese goalkeeper Shūichi Gonda towards the top corner.

Japan regained possession and found several scoring chances before and after halftime, including a missed header from Yoshinori Muto and several corner kicks, but were unable to produce a shot on goal. Qatar received an early chance to score their third goal in the 56th minute on a counterattack, but the shot by Hatem went over the crossbar. The lead was cut to 2–1 with a 69th-minute goal from close range by Takumi Minamino—the first to be conceded by Qatar during the tournament. Qatar were awarded a penalty kick in the 82nd minute by the video assistant referee for a handball by Japanese captain Maya Yoshida, who blocked a shot from a corner kick. The penalty was converted by Akram Afif to give Qatar a 3–1 lead that they kept until the end of the match.

=== Details ===
1 February 2019
18:00 AST

Japan	1–3	Qatar
Minamino 69'	Report	Ali 12'; Hatem 27'; Afif 83' (pen.)

Zayed Sports City Stadium, Abu Dhabi
Attendance: 36,776
Referee: Ravshan Irmatov (Uzbekistan)

Japan	Qatar

GK	12	Shūichi Gonda
RB	19	Hiroki Sakai	(yellow card) 86'
CB	16	Takehiro Tomiyasu
CB	22	Maya Yoshida (c)	(yellow card) 82'
LB	5	Yuto Nagatomo
CM	7	Gaku Shibasaki	(yellow card) 20'
CM	18	Tsukasa Shiotani		(substituted off) 84'
RW	21	Ritsu Dōan
AM	9	Takumi Minamino		(substituted off) 89'
LW	8	Genki Haraguchi		(substituted off) 62'
CF	15	Yuya Osako
Substitutions:
FW	13	Yoshinori Muto		(substituted on) 62'
FW	14	Junya Itō		(substituted on) 84'
FW	10	Takashi Inui		(substituted on) 89'
Manager:
Hajime Moriyasu

GK	1	Saad Al-Sheeb
CB	15	Bassam Al-Rawi
CB	16	Boualem Khoukhi		(substituted off) 61'
CB	4	Tarek Salman
RM	2	Pedro Miguel	(yellow card) 90+3'
CM	23	Assim Madibo
CM	6	Abdulaziz Hatem
LM	3	Abdelkarim Hassan
RF	10	Hassan Al-Haydos (c)		(substituted off) 74'
CF	19	Almoez Ali		(substituted off) 90+6'
LF	11	Akram Afif	(yellow card) 84'
Substitutions:
MF	14	Salem Al-Hajri		(substituted on) 61'
MF	12	Karim Boudiaf		(substituted on) 74'
FW	7	Ahmed Alaaeldin		(substituted on) 90+6'
Manager:
(Spain) Félix Sánchez

Man of the Match:
Akram Afif (Qatar)

Assistant referees:
Abdukhamidullo Rasulov (Uzbekistan)
Jakhongir Saidov (Uzbekistan)
Fourth official:
Ma Ning (China PR)
Reserve assistant referee:
Huo Weiming (China PR)
Video assistant referee:
Paolo Valeri (Italy)
Assistant video assistant referees:
Muhammad Taqi (Singapore)
Chris Beath (Australia)

Match rules

- 90 minutes.
- 30 minutes of extra time if necessary.
- Penalty shoot-out if scores still level.
- Maximum of three substitutions, with a fourth allowed in extra time.

== Post-match ==
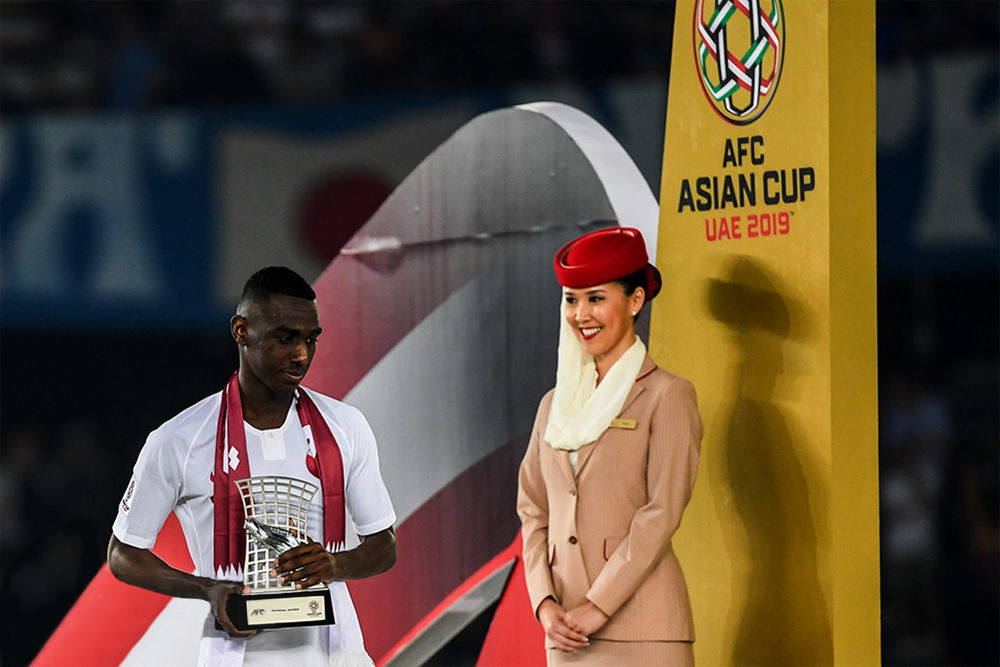
Almoez Ali won the top scorer award as well as the MVP award as the best player of the tournament.

With their victory over Japan, Qatar had earned its first Asian Cup title and became the ninth country to win the tournament. They had never previously advanced past the quarter-finals. The match was Japan's first loss in the tournament after a perfect record of six wins as well as their first loss in an Asian Cup final, having won the previous four final matches. Qatar finished the tournament with a perfect record, winning all seven matches en route to the title. The match also marked the debut of a new match ball and trophy for the Asian Cup, as well as the first use of a video assistant referee during the tournament final.

Almoez Ali, who was named the AFC Asian Cup MVP as the best player of the tournament, won the top scorer award after scoring nine of Qatar's 19 goals in the tournament, surpassing the Asian Cup record of eight goals set by Ali Daei of Iran in 1996. Goalkeeper Saad Al Sheeb kept six successive clean sheets, winning him the award for best goalkeeper of the tournament, and only conceded one goal during the entire tournament, to Takumi Minamino in the final. Qatar's Akram Afif was selected as the final's man of the match, with one penalty goal and two assists in the match. Overall, he finished the tournament with ten assists, the most of any player. Runners-up Japan won the fair play award as the team with the tournament's best disciplinary record. According to Qatar-based media outlet Al Jazeera, Emirati newspapers emphasized that Japan lost the final, reflecting the ongoing diplomatic rift between Qatar and the UAE.

Qatar and Japan were both invited to also compete in the 2019 Copa América prior to the tournament. Qatar repeated as Asian Cup champions in the 2023 edition, becoming the first team to win consecutive tournaments since Japan in 2000 and 2004.

== See also ==
- 2019 AFC Asian Cup knockout stage
