= Irrawaddy =

Irrawaddy or Ayeyarwady may refer to:

- Irrawaddy River, the main river of Myanmar (Burma)
- Irrawaddy Delta, a rice growing region of Myanmar
- Irrawaddy, an alternative spelling of Ayeyarwady Region, an administrative division of Myanmar
- The Irrawaddy, a Burmese news publication based in Chiang Mai, Thailand
- Irrawaddy dolphin, a dolphin which is found in the Irrawaddy River
- "Waters of Irrawaddy", the first song in Beyond Rangoon (soundtrack), composed by Hans Zimmer
- Irrawaddy Green Towers, a mobile phone tower company which works for the military joint venture Mytel
- The star HD 18742, also named Ayeyarwady

== See also ==
- Iravati River (disambiguation), alternative form of the river's name
- Iravati, a character in Hindu mythology, mother of the elephant Airavata
