= Iravati River =

Iravati River may refer to:

- Iravati River, alternative name of Ravi River, a transboundary river crossing North-Western India and Eastern Pakistan
- Iravati River, alternative spelling of Irrawaddy River, from north to south through Myanmar

== See also ==
- Iravati, a character in Hindu mythology, mother of the elephant Airavata
- Irrawaddy (disambiguation)
- Ravi (disambiguation)
