= 2019 AFC Asian Cup Group E =

Football tournament group stage

Group E of the 2019 AFC Asian Cup took place from 8 to 17 January 2019. The group consisted of Saudi Arabia, Qatar, Lebanon and North Korea. The top two teams, Qatar and Saudi Arabia, advanced to the round of 16. However, third-placed Lebanon missed out qualification to the knockout stage by fair play points to Vietnam.

Saudi Arabia were the only former champions in the group, having won three Asian Cup titles in 1984, 1988 and 1996.

== Teams ==
Draw position	Team	Zone	Method of qualification	Date of qualification	Finals appearance	Last appearance	Previous best performance	FIFA Rankings	
Draw position	Team	Zone	Method of qualification	Date of qualification	Finals appearance	Last appearance	Previous best performance	April 2018 (Note: The rankings of April 2018 were used for seeding for the final draw.)	December 2018
E1	Saudi Arabia	WAFF	Second round group A winners	24 March 2016	10th	2015 (group stage)	Winners (1984, 1988, 1996)	70	69
E2	Qatar	WAFF	Second round group C winners	17 November 2015	10th	2015 (group stage)	Quarter-finals (2000, 2011)	101	93
E3	Lebanon	WAFF	Third Round Group B winners	10 November 2017	2nd	2000 (group stage)	Group stage (2000)	82	81
E4	North Korea	EAFF	Third Round Group B runners-up	27 March 2018	5th	2015 (group stage)	Fourth place (1980)	112	109

== Standings ==
Pos	Team	Pld	W	D	L	GF	GA	GD	Pts	Qualification
1	Qatar	3	3	0	0	10	0	+10	9	Advance to knockout stage
2	Saudi Arabia	3	2	0	1	6	2	+4	6	Advance to knockout stage
3	Lebanon	3	1	0	2	4	5	−1	3	
4	North Korea	3	0	0	3	1	14	−13	0	

Source: AFC
Rules for classification: Group stage tiebreakers

In the round of 16:

- The winners of Group E, Qatar, advanced to play the runners-up of Group D, Iraq.
- The runners-up of Group E, Saudi Arabia, advanced to play the winners of Group F, Japan.

== Matches ==
All times listed are GST (UTC+4).

=== Saudi Arabia vs North Korea ===
The first chance of the game came in the 13th minute through Abdulaziz Al-Bishi’s left-footed strike which just missed the target. In the 28th minute, Hattan Bahebri dribbled past Ri Il-jin and sent a curler from the left to give Saudi Arabia the lead. Housain Al-Mogahwi’s free kick from just outside the box sailed into the box and Mohammed Al-Fatil diverted it into the net with a back-heel to double Saudi Arabia’s advantage. Just a minute before the break, Han Kwang-song received a second yellow card for a tackle on Al-Mogahwi. North Korea were reduced to 10 men but they came close to scoring in the 64th minute through captain Jong Il-gwan. However, the Saudi defenders regrouped to deny him. Moments later, Saudi Arabia had a missed opportunity, when Fahad Al-Muwallad side-stepped defender Kim Chol-bom and goalkeeper Ri Myong-guk but his shot flew wide. In the 70th minute, Salem Al-Dawsari was left unmarked and the Saudi captain made no mistake from the centre of the box to make it 3–0. In the 87th minute, defender Kim Song-gi failed to clear Hamdan Al-Shamrani’s cross into the box and Al-Muwallad slammed the ball into the back of the net to seal Saudi Arabia’s first opening AFC Asian Cup match win since they emerged champions in 1996.

8 January 2019
20:00

Saudi Arabia	4–0	North Korea
Bahebri 28'; Al-Fatil 37'; Al-Dawsari 70'; Al-Muwallad 87'	Report

Rashid Stadium, Dubai
Attendance: 5,075
Referee: Peter Green (Australia)

Saudi Arabia	North Korea

GK	21	Mohammed Al-Owais
RB	2	Mohammed Al-Breik
CB	4	Ali Al-Bulaihi
CB	23	Mohammed Al-Fatil
LB	13	Yasser Al-Shahrani		(substituted off) 82'
DM	14	Abdullah Otayf
CM	16	Housain Al-Mogahwi
CM	20	Abdulaziz Al-Bishi		(substituted off) 71'
RW	11	Hattan Bahebri		(substituted off) 78'
LW	10	Salem Al-Dawsari (c)	(yellow card) 45+1'
CF	19	Fahad Al-Muwallad
Substitutions:
MF	18	Abdulrahman Ghareeb		(substituted on) 71'
FW	9	Mohammed Al-Saiari		(substituted on) 78'
DF	12	Hamdan Al-Shamrani		(substituted on) 82'
Manager:
(Spain) Juan Antonio Pizzi

GK	1	Ri Myong-guk
RB	5	An Song-il		(substituted off) 46'
CB	4	Kim Song-gi
CB	16	Ri Yong-jik		(substituted off) 90+1'
LB	3	Jang Kuk-chol		(substituted off) 56'
RM	23	Ri Il-jin	(yellow card) 53'
CM	15	Ri Un-chol
LM	2	Kim Chol-bom	(yellow card) 32'
AM	7	Han Kwang-song	(yellow card) 36' (yellow-red card) 44'
AM	11	Jong Il-gwan (c)	(yellow card) 90'
CF	10	Pak Kwang-ryong
Substitutions:
MF	12	Kim Kyong-hun		(substituted on) 46'
DF	17	Ri Chang-ho		(substituted on) 56'
FW	19	Rim Kwang-hyok		(substituted on) 90+1'
Manager:
Kim Yong-jun

Man of the Match:
Salem Al-Dawsari (Saudi Arabia)

Assistant referees:
Matthew Cream (Australia)
Anton Shchetinin (Australia)
Fourth official:
Sergei Grishchenko (Kyrgyzstan)
Additional assistant referees:
Valentin Kovalenko (Uzbekistan)
Chris Beath (Australia)

=== Qatar vs Lebanon ===
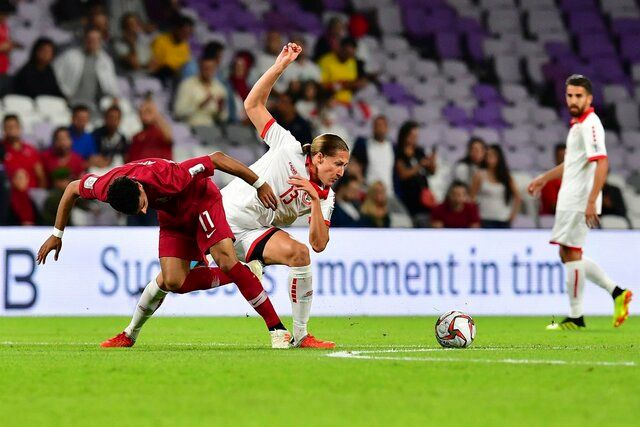
Lebanon's Felix Michel Melki vies for the ball with Qatari forward Akram Afif.

In the 37th minute, Ali Hamam raced off to celebrate with his teammates after slotting Hassan Maatouk's corner into the Qatari goal, only for the referee to controversially blow the whistle for a foul on Tarek Salman. Maatouk pulled the trigger on an effort of his own just before half-time, but his scissor kick flew high over the bar. Two minutes after the hour mark, 2018 AFC Player of the Year Abdelkarim Hassan was introduced from the bench for Abdulkarim Al-Ali and within three minutes, the Qataris took the lead from Bassam Al-Rawi's strike from a free kick. The defender sent a dipping, curling right-footed effort over the wall and beyond the outstretched hand of Mehdi Khalil. Qatar added a second with 11 minutes remaining. Hassan's driving run created space for Akram Afif and, when the winger received the ball, his centre found Abdulaziz Hatem, whose shot was saved by Khalil. But Almoez Ali was on hand to roll the ball into the empty net to ensure a winning start to the campaign for Qatar.

9 January 2019
20:00

Qatar	2–0	Lebanon
Al-Rawi 65'; Ali 79'	Report

Hazza bin Zayed Stadium, Al Ain
Attendance: 7,847
Referee: Ma Ning (China PR)

Qatar	Lebanon

GK	1	Saad Al-Sheeb
CB	2	Ró-Ró
CB	4	Tarek Salman
CB	15	Bassam Al-Rawi
RM	23	Assim Madibo
CM	16	Boualem Khoukhi
CM	12	Karim Boudiaf	(substituted off) 56'
LM	18	Abdulkarim Al-Ali	(substituted off) 62'
RF	10	Hassan Al-Haydos (c)	(substituted off) 85'
CF	19	Almoez Ali
LF	11	Akram Afif
Substitutions:
MF	6	Abdulaziz Hatem	(substituted on) 56'
DF	3	Abdelkarim Hassan	(substituted on) 62'
FW	7	Ahmed Alaaeldin	(substituted on) 85'
Manager:
(Spain) Félix Sánchez

GK	1	Mehdi Khalil
RB	11	Alexander Michel Melki	(yellow card) 24'	(substituted off) 72'
CB	3	Mootaz El Jounaidi		(substituted off) 84'
CB	6	Joan Oumari
LB	13	Felix Michel Melki		(substituted off) 77'
DM	15	Haytham Faour
RM	19	Ali Hamam
LM	18	Walid Ismail
AM	22	Bassel Jradi
CF	9	Hilal El-Helwe
CF	7	Hassan Maatouk (c)	(yellow card) 64'
Substitutions:
MF	14	Nader Matar		(substituted on) 72'
MF	5	Samir Ayass		(substituted on) 77'
MF	10	Mohamad Haidar		(substituted on) 84'
Manager:
(Montenegro) Miodrag Radulović

Man of the Match:
Assim Madibo (Qatar)

Assistant referees:
Huo Weiming (China PR)
Cao Yi (China PR)
Fourth official:
Ronnie Koh Min Kiat (Singapore)
Additional assistant referees:
Fu Ming (China PR)
Liu Kwok Man (Hong Kong)

=== Lebanon vs Saudi Arabia ===
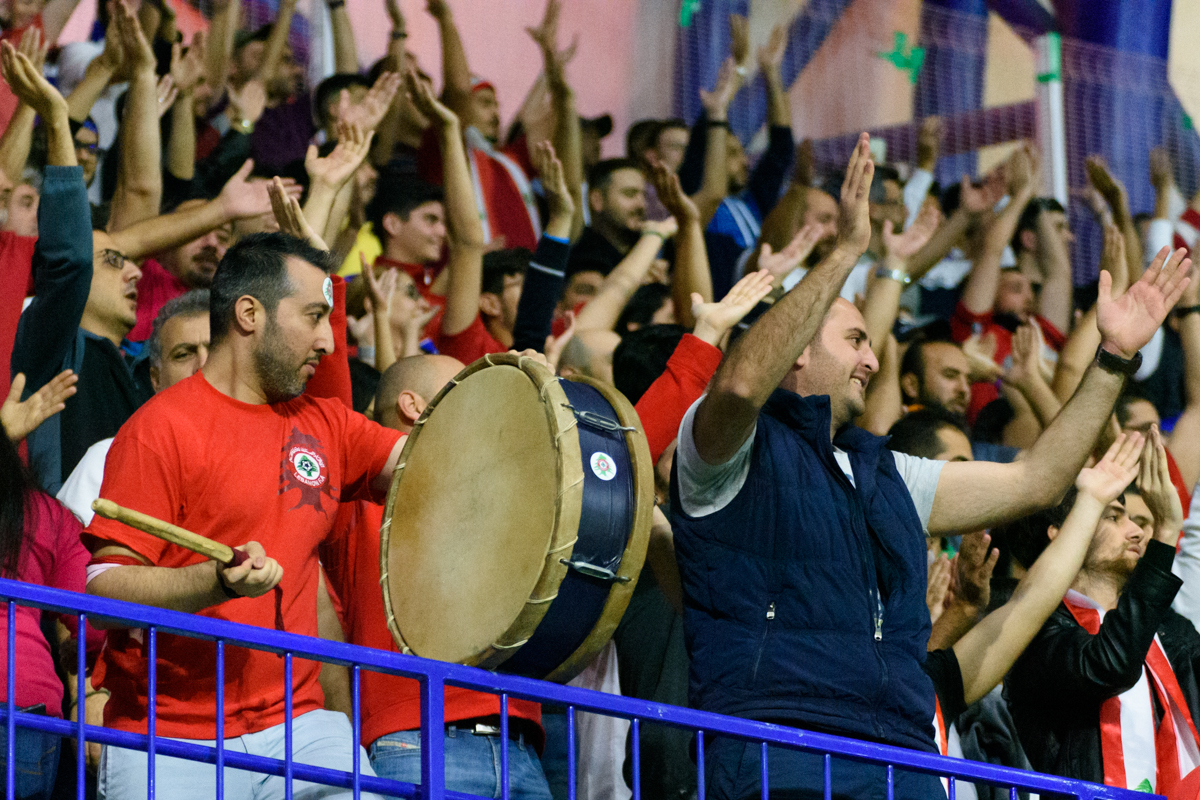
Lebanon fans during the match against Saudi Arabia.

Saudi Arabia found their breakthrough in the 12th minute when they latched onto a defensive mistake. Lebanon’s Joan Oumari’s back pass deflected off teammate Alexander Michel Melki’s left boot. The ball landed near Saudi Arabia’s Fahad Al-Muwallad, who half-volleyed home from close range. Oumari failed to keep his header down in the 16th minute, while Felix Michel Melki just missed Hassan Maatouk’s free kick eight minutes later. After the break, Hattan Bahebri took a chance from almost 30 yards out which forced a save from goalkeeper Mehdi Khalil. Bahebri made an assist in the 67th minute, when his cross into the box found Housain Al-Mogahwi, who made it 2–0. This win earned Saudi Arabia a ticket to the round of sixteen for the first time since the 2007 edition, in which Saudi Arabia finished runners-up.

12 January 2019
20:00

Lebanon	0–2	Saudi Arabia
	Report	Al-Muwallad 12'; Al-Mogahwi 67'

Al Maktoum Stadium, Dubai
Attendance: 13,792
Referee: Ali Sabah (Iraq)

Lebanon	Saudi Arabia

GK	1	Mehdi Khalil
RB	11	Alexander Michel Melki
CB	2	Kassem El Zein
CB	3	Mootaz El Jounaidi
CB	6	Joan Oumari
LB	13	Felix Michel Melki	(yellow card) 70'
DM	15	Haytham Faour		(substituted off) 73'
RM	19	Ali Hamam
LM	7	Hassan Maatouk (c)		(substituted off) 76'
AM	10	Mohamad Haidar	(yellow card) 82'	(substituted off) 86'
CF	9	Hilal El-Helwe	(yellow card) 89'
Substitutions:
FW	20	Rabih Ataya		(substituted on) 73'
MF	14	Nader Matar		(substituted on) 76'
DF	17	Mohamed Zein Tahan		(substituted on) 86'
Manager:
(Montenegro) Miodrag Radulović

GK	21	Mohammed Al-Owais
RB	2	Mohammed Al-Breik
CB	23	Mohammed Al-Fatil
CB	4	Ali Al-Bulaihi
LB	12	Hamdan Al-Shamrani
DM	14	Abdullah Otayf		(substituted off) 84'
CM	20	Abdulaziz Al-Bishi	(yellow card) 41'	(substituted off) 79'
CM	16	Housain Al-Mogahwi
RW	11	Hattan Bahebri
LW	10	Salem Al-Dawsari (c)	(yellow card) 90+2'
CF	19	Fahad Al-Muwallad		(substituted off) 73'
Substitutions:
MF	8	Yahya Al-Shehri		(substituted on) 73'
MF	18	Abdulrahman Ghareeb		(substituted on) 79'
MF	15	Ibrahim Ghaleb		(substituted on) 84'
Manager:
(Spain) Juan Antonio Pizzi

Man of the Match:
Hattan Bahebri (Saudi Arabia)

Assistant referees:
Abu Bakar Al-Amri (Oman)
Rashid Al-Ghaithi (Oman)
Fourth official:
Abdukhamidullo Rasulov (Uzbekistan)
Additional assistant referees:
Mohanad Qassim (Iraq)
Mohd Amirul Izwan Yaacob (Malaysia)

=== North Korea vs Qatar ===
Qatar were in front in the ninth minute when Akram Afif glided past Sim Hyon-jin before delivering a low cross to Almoez Ali, who struck past Ri Myong-guk. Qatar doubled their lead two minutes later, when Abdelkarim Hassan’s ball found Hassan Al-Haydos, whose low centre was struck in the goal from close range by Ali. Ri Un-chol tried from outside the area, but his drive narrowly failed to find the top corner. With just two minutes remaining in the first half, Afif lifted the ball high over the advancing Myong-guk and Boualem Khoukhi headed in from close range. Ali completed his hat-trick 10 minutes into the second half with a finish from Afif’s through ball. Five minutes later, Afif led a counter-attack before rolling the ball through to Ali, who smashed his shot across Myong-guk and inside the far post. Ali turned provider in the 68th minute when his pass allowed Hassan to storm through the North Korean defence and slot home Qatar’s sixth. The East Asian side’s misery was compounded in the last minute when Jong Il-gwan was shown a second yellow card.

It was North Korea’s heaviest ever defeat at the Asian Cup, surpassing their previous 0–4 defeat to Saudi Arabia in their opening 2019 Asian Cup match. Qatar’s win enabled them to progress to the knockout stages for the first time since the 2011 edition that they hosted. Controversy rose around the almost empty stadium as very few fans were allowed to enter.

13 January 2019
15:00

North Korea	0–6	Qatar
	Report	Ali 9', 11', 55', 60'; Khoukhi 43'; A. Hassan 68'

Khalifa bin Zayed Stadium, Al Ain
Attendance: 452
Referee: Hettikamkanamge Perera (Sri Lanka)

North Korea	Qatar

GK	1	Ri Myong-guk
CB	13	Sim Hyon-jin
CB	4	Kim Song-gi		(substituted off) 77'
CB	2	Kim Chol-bom
RM	23	Ri Il-jin	(yellow card) 17'
CM	15	Ri Un-chol	(yellow card) 13'
LM	12	Kim Kyong-hun
RW	9	Kim Yong-il	(yellow card) 39'	(substituted off) 43'
AM	11	Jong Il-gwan (c)	(yellow card) 17' (yellow-red card) 90'
LW	19	Rim Kwang-hyok		(substituted off) 63'
CF	10	Pak Kwang-ryong	(yellow card) 54'
Substitutions:
MF	8	Ri Hyok-chol		(substituted on) 43'
MF	16	Ri Yong-jik		(substituted on) 63'
DF	6	Ri Thong-il		(substituted on) 77'
Manager:
Kim Yong-jun

GK	1	Saad Al-Sheeb
RB	2	Ró-Ró		(substituted off) 74'
CB	15	Bassam Al-Rawi
CB	4	Tarek Salman
LB	3	Abdelkarim Hassan	(yellow card) 7'	(substituted off) 80'
CM	23	Assim Madibo		(substituted off) 71'
CM	6	Abdulaziz Hatem
RW	10	Hassan Al-Haydos (c)
AM	16	Boualem Khoukhi
LW	11	Akram Afif
CF	19	Almoez Ali
Substitutions:
MF	5	Ahmed Fatehi		(substituted on) 71'
DF	8	Hamid Ismail		(substituted on) 74'
MF	20	Ali Afif		(substituted on) 80'
Manager:
(Spain) Félix Sánchez

Man of the Match:
Almoez Ali (Qatar)

Assistant referees:
Palitha Hemathunga (Sri Lanka)
Jakhongir Saidov (Uzbekistan)
Fourth official:
Matthew Cream (Australia)
Additional assistant referees:
Valentin Kovalenko (Uzbekistan)
Ilgiz Tantashev (Uzbekistan)

=== Saudi Arabia vs Qatar ===
Mohammed Al-Owais parried away Boualem Khoukhi's drive on 16 minutes in the first genuine threat to either goal. Housain Al-Mogahwi shot over the bar for Saudi Arabia following Yahya Al-Shehri's probing run and cross, before Fahad Al-Muwallad struck an upright with Qatar goalkeeper Saad Al-Sheeb beaten. Hassan Al-Haydos' 42nd minute penalty was saved by Al-Owais. However, minutes later, Abdulaziz Hatem's through ball found Almoez Ali who converted to open the scoring on the stroke of half-time. Within five minutes of the restart Hattan Bahebri forced Al-Sheeb into a save. Bahebri's effort from 15 yards fizzed narrowly over the bar on 73 minutes. Qatar extended their lead with 10 minutes remaining, when Ali leaped to thump home a header from Hatem's corner. It proved to be the final genuine goalmouth action as Qatar held on to seal another three points.

The match was dubbed the "Blockade Derby", in reference to the diplomatic disputes between the two nations. However, there was no on-field incidents and the match ended in a friendly atmosphere.

17 January 2019
20:00

Saudi Arabia	0–2	Qatar
	Report	Ali 45+1', 80'

Zayed Sports City Stadium, Abu Dhabi
Attendance: 16,067
Referee: Kim Dong-jin (South Korea)

Saudi Arabia	Qatar

GK	21	Mohammed Al-Owais
RB	2	Mohammed Al-Breik
CB	4	Ali Al-Bulaihi	(yellow card) 41'
CB	23	Mohammed Al-Fatil
LB	12	Hamdan Al-Shamrani
DM	14	Abdullah Otayf		(substituted off) 78'
CM	8	Yahya Al-Shehri (c)
CM	16	Housain Al-Mogahwi
RW	11	Hattan Bahebri
LW	19	Fahad Al-Muwallad		(substituted off) 75'
CF	18	Abdulrahman Ghareeb		(substituted off) 61'
Substitutions:
FW	9	Mohammed Al-Saiari	(yellow card) 82'	(substituted on) 61'
MF	6	Ayman Al-Khulaif		(substituted on) 75'
MF	7	Nooh Al-Mousa		(substituted on) 78'
Manager:
(Spain) Juan Antonio Pizzi

GK	1	Saad Al-Sheeb
RB	2	Ró-Ró
CB	15	Bassam Al-Rawi
CB	4	Tarek Salman
LB	3	Abdelkarim Hassan
CM	6	Abdulaziz Hatem	(yellow card) 58'
CM	23	Assim Madibo	(yellow card) 7'	(substituted off) 69'
CM	16	Boualem Khoukhi
RF	10	Hassan Al-Haydos (c)		(substituted off) 73'
CF	19	Almoez Ali	(yellow card) 45+1'	(substituted off) 83'
LF	11	Akram Afif
Substitutions:
MF	14	Salem Al-Hajri		(substituted on) 69'
MF	12	Karim Boudiaf		(substituted on) 73'
FW	7	Ahmed Alaaeldin		(substituted on) 83'
Manager:
(Spain) Félix Sánchez

Man of the Match:
Almoez Ali (Qatar)

Assistant referees:
Yoon Kwang-yeol (South Korea)
Park Sang-jun (South Korea)
Fourth official:
Cao Yi (China PR)
Additional assistant referees:
Ko Hyung-jin (South Korea)
Fu Ming (China PR)

=== Lebanon vs North Korea ===
Pak Kwang-ryong converted his free kick in the ninth minute to give North Korea an early advantage. However, Lebanon levelled the score just before the half hour mark when Hassan Maatouk dribbled down the left before laying off for Felix Michel Melki, who smashed the ball into the back of the net. Hilal El-Helwe’s effort was cleared off the line in the 32nd minute. Felix came close to scoring his second in the 57th minute but angled his header across the bar. In the 65th minute, Mohamad Haidar’s cross found El-Helwe who turned to score from close range. North Korea conceded a penalty after Rabih Ataya was brought down in the danger area. Maatouk converted the spot-kick in the 80th minute, sending goalkeeper Ri Myong-guk the wrong way, with a fourth coming in the eighth minute of added time through El-Helwe as Lebanon won their first ever Asian Cup match. However, they were edged by Vietnam in the third-place ranking on fair-play points due to receiving more yellow cards and were eliminated from the tournament. This loss extended North Korea's winless streak, with their last win dating back to their fourth place finish in the 1980 edition.

17 January 2019
20:00

Lebanon	4–1	North Korea
F. Michel Melki 27'; El-Helwe 65', 90+8'; Maatouk 80' (pen.)	Report	Pak Kwang-ryong 9'

Sharjah Stadium, Sharjah
Attendance: 4,332
Referee: Chris Beath (Australia)

Lebanon	North Korea

GK	1	Mehdi Khalil
RB	11	Alexander Michel Melki	(yellow card) 30'
CB	4	Nour Mansour		(substituted off) 81'
CB	6	Joan Oumari
LB	13	Felix Michel Melki
CM	5	Samir Ayass		(substituted off) 77'
CM	14	Nader Matar		(substituted off) 53'
RW	7	Hassan Maatouk (c)
AM	10	Mohamad Haidar	(yellow card) 90+9'
LW	18	Walid Ismail
CF	9	Hilal El-Helwe
Substitutions:
FW	20	Rabih Ataya		(substituted on) 53'
MF	12	Adnan Haidar		(substituted on) 77'
FW	8	Hassan "Moni" Chaito		(substituted on) 81'
Manager:
(Montenegro) Miodrag Radulović

GK	1	Ri Myong-guk
CB	5	An Song-il	(yellow card) 11'
CB	16	Ri Yong-jik
CB	3	Jang Kuk-chol (c)
RWB	13	Sim Hyon-jin
LWB	2	Kim Chol-bom	(yellow card) 61'	(substituted off) 61'
CM	9	Kim Yong-il	(yellow card) 85'
CM	15	Ri Un-chol
CM	12	Kim Kyong-hun		(substituted off) 29'
CF	7	Han Kwang-song
CF	10	Pak Kwang-ryong
Substitutions:
MF	14	Kang Kuk-chol		(substituted on) 29'	(substituted off) 75'
MF	8	Ri Hyok-chol	(yellow card) 72'	(substituted on) 61'
MF	20	Choe Song-hyok			(substituted on) 75'
Manager:
Kim Yong-jun

Man of the Match:
Felix Michel Melki (Lebanon)

Assistant referees:
Matthew Cream (Australia)
Anton Shchetinin (Australia)
Fourth official:
Ronnie Koh Min Kiat (Singapore)
Additional assistant referees:
Muhammad Taqi (Singapore)
Liu Kwok Man (Hong Kong)

== Discipline ==
Fair play points were used as tiebreakers if the head-to-head and overall records of teams were tied (and if a penalty shoot-out was not applicable as a tiebreaker). These were calculated based on yellow and red cards received in all group matches as follows:

- yellow card = 1 point
- red card as a result of two yellow cards = 3 points
- direct red card = 3 points
- yellow card followed by direct red card = 4 points

Only one of the above deductions was applied to a player in a single match.

Team	Match 1				Match 2				Match 3				Points
Team	Booked	(yellow card) (yellow-red card)	Sent off (straight red)	(yellow card) (red card)	Booked	(yellow card) (yellow-red card)	Sent off (straight red)	(yellow card) (red card)	Booked	(yellow card) (yellow-red card)	Sent off (straight red)	(yellow card) (red card)	Points
Qatar					1				3				−4
Saudi Arabia	1				2				2				−5
Lebanon	2				3				2				−7
North Korea	3	1			4	1			4				−17
