= Ravi =

Ravi may refer to:

== People ==
- Ravi (name), including a list of people and characters with the name
- Ravi (composer) (1926–2012), Indian music director
- Ravi (Ivar Johansen) (born 1976), Norwegian musical artist
- Ravi (rapper) (born 1993), a South Korean rapper
- Ravi, an actor in the 2018 film Dhwaja

== Other ==
- Ravi, Gavorrano, a village in the province of Grosseto, Tuscany
- Ravi River, a Himalayan river flowing through India and Pakistan
- Ravi Town, a town near Lahore, Pakistan
- An alternative name for Surya, the Sanskrit word for the Sun and the Hindu solar deity
- Ravi, a fictional state in The Ravi Lancers, a novel by John Masters
- Ravi-datta, a character in the 11th-century Indian story collection Shringara-manjari-katha
- Suzuki Ravi, a pickup truck

== See also ==
- Rabi (disambiguation)
- Rawi (disambiguation)
- Ravindra (disambiguation)
- Iravati River (disambiguation), ancient name of the river in India and Pakistan
