= Guntis Ravis =

Latvian businessman

Guntis Rāvis
- Occupation: Businessperson
- Known for: Chairman of Skonto Group
- Spouse: Ramona Burtniece

Guntis Rāvis is a Latvian businessman and chairman of the board of the largest construction company in Latvia called Skonto Group. Rāvis is known to also own more than 40 companies operating in construction as well as production of construction materials.

In July 2019, he was linked to Broka bribery probe.
