= Félix Sánchez (football manager) =

Spanish football manager (born 1975)

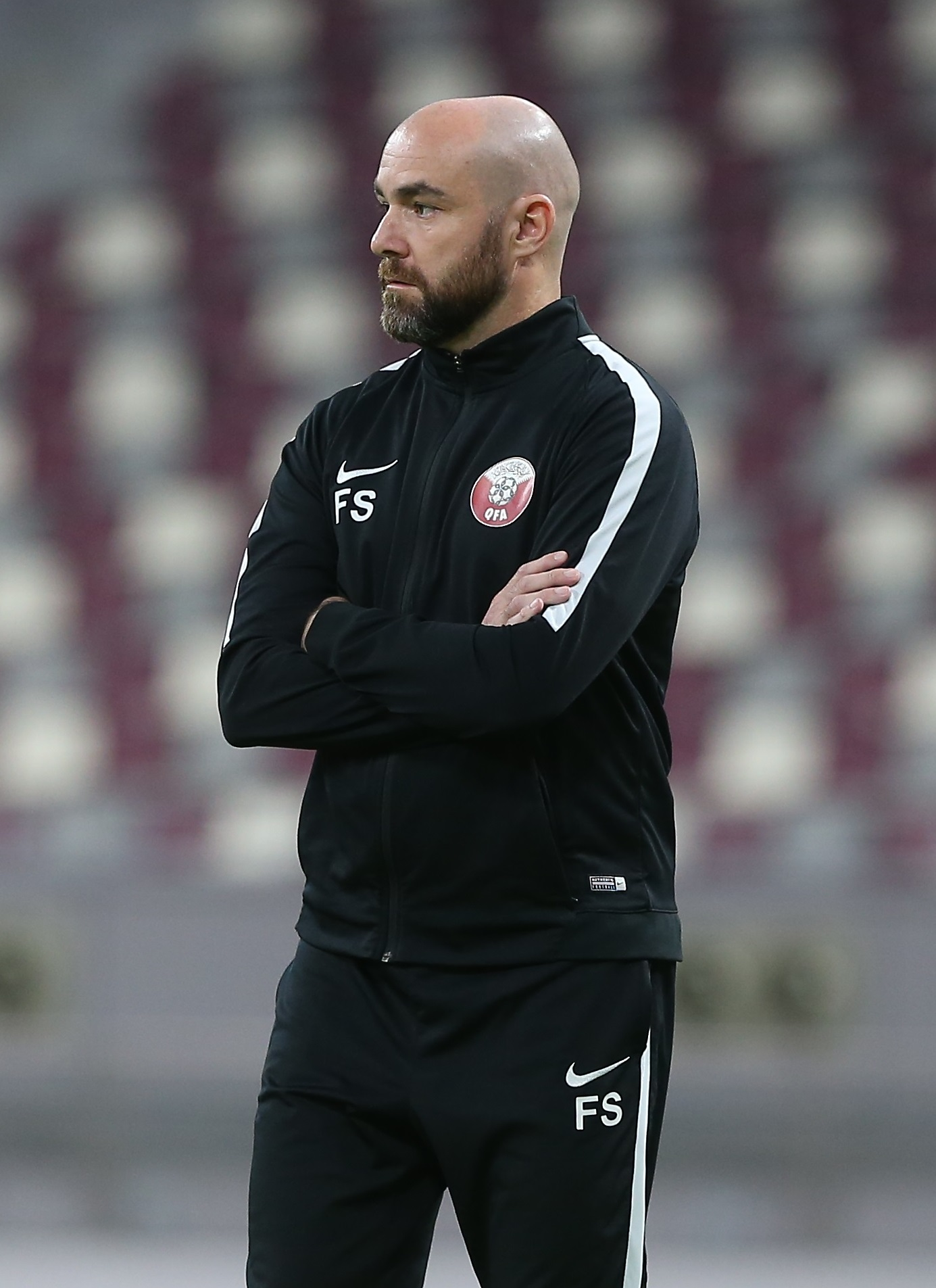
- Sánchez as Qatar manager in 2018

Personal information
- Full name: Félix Sánchez Bas
- Date of birth: 13 December 1975 (age 50)
- Place of birth: Barcelona, Spain

Team information
- Current team: Bahrain (head coach)

Managerial career
- Years: Team
- 1996–2006: Barcelona (youth)
- 2006–2013: Aspire Academy
- 2013–2017: Qatar U19
- 2017–2020: Qatar U23
- 2017–2022: Qatar
- 2023–2024: Ecuador
- 2024–2025: Al Sadd
- 2026–: Bahrain
Medal record
Men's football
Representing Qatar (as manager)
AFC Asian Cup
Winner	UAE 2019
FIFA Arab Cup
Bronze medal – third place	Qatar 2021
AFC U-19 Championship
Winner	Myanmar 2014
AFC U-23 Championship
Bronze medal – third place	China 2018

Félix Sánchez Bas (born 13 December 1975) is a Spanish football coach, He is currently head coach for Bahrain national football team.

Sánchez spent most of his career in Qatar, first with the national youth teams until being appointed to the senior team in 2017. His side won the 2019 AFC Asian Cup and were semi-finalists at the 2021 CONCACAF Gold Cup. He left after their group-stage elimination in their hosting of the 2022 FIFA World Cup, and became manager of Ecuador. Sánchez resigned as manager of Ecuador after they were eliminated in the 2024 Copa América quarter-finals.

== Career ==
=== Early career ===
Originally an FC Barcelona youth coach, Sánchez moved to Qatar in 2006 and joined Aspire Academy. In 2013, he was appointed coach of the Qatar under-19 side, winning the following year's AFC U-19 Championship.

=== Qatar national team ===
On 3 July 2017, after a spell with the under-20s and under-23s, Sánchez replaced Jorge Fossati at the helm of the senior side. On his debut on 16 August, he won 1–0 against Andorra in a friendly at St George's Park in England. The side finished the year without qualifying for the 2018 FIFA World Cup, and were eliminated from the group stage of the 23rd Arabian Gulf Cup.

Sánchez led Qatar to the AFC Asian Cup title for the first time in 2019 tournament, having won all three group matches and knockout stage matches including a 3–1 win over Japan in the final, scoring 19 times and conceding only once. In May that year, he signed a new contract until the 2022 FIFA World Cup, to be hosted by Qatar. Weeks later, the team were invitees to the 2019 Copa América in Brazil, being knocked out in the group. In December, at the 24th Arabian Gulf Cup on home soil, the side reached the semi-finals.

Qatar were also invited to the 2021 CONCACAF Gold Cup in the United States, where the hosts eliminated them 1–0 in the semi-finals. At the end of the year, his side made it to the semi-finals of the inaugural FIFA Arab Cup on home turf, eventually finishing third. In the 2022 FIFA World Cup hosted by Qatar, the national team lost all their matches in Group A, to become the worst performing host nation in the history of the competition. His contract with Qatar expired on 31 December of the same year and was not renewed.

=== Ecuador national team ===
On 11 March 2023, Sánchez signed a four-year deal to be manager of the Ecuador national football team. On his debut thirteen days later, the team lost 3–1 on his debut, a friendly with Australia in Sydney.

After losing against the Argentine soccer team on penalties 4-2 (a 1-1 draw in regulation time) in quarter-finals in the Copa America USA 2024, the Ecuadorian Football Federation made his departure from the Ecuadorian team official, culminating nearly 20 months of being in the team.

=== Al Sadd ===
On 23 July 2024, Sánchez returned to Qatar after being announced as manager of Al Sadd; it was his first senior club experience.

== Managerial statistics ==
As of match played 17 November 2025

Managerial record by team and tenure
Team	From	To	Record					Ref.
Team	From	To	M	W	D	L	Win %	Ref.
Qatar U19	1 July 2013	30 June 2015	10	9	1	0	90.0	
Qatar U20	1 January 2014	2 July 2017	12	2	2	8	16.7	
Qatar U23	3 July 2017	28 December 2020	32	10	9	13	31.3	
Qatar	3 July 2017	31 December 2022	89	46	16	27	51.7	
Ecuador	11 March 2023	5 July 2024	19	10	4	5	52.6	
Al Sadd	23 July 2024	15 October 2025	50	25	12	13	50.0	
Bahrain	12 October 2026	Present	2	1	1	0	50.0	
Total			214	103	45	66	48.1	—

== Honours ==
Qatar U19

- AFC U-19 Championship: 2014

Qatar U23

- AFC U-23 Championship third place: 2018

Qatar

- AFC Asian Cup: 2019

Al Sadd

- Qatar Stars League: 2024-25
- Qatar Cup: 2025
