= Qatar at the CONCACAF Gold Cup =

The CONCACAF Gold Cup is North America's major tournament in senior men's soccer and determines the continental champion. Until 1989, the tournament was known as CONCACAF Championship.

Qatar are not members of the North American football confederation CONCACAF, and were invited to the Gold Cup as guests for the first time in 2021.

== Overall record ==
Qatar was the second team from Asia to participate in the CONCACAF Gold Cup, and were invited for the first time in 2021.

CONCACAF Gold Cup record
Year	Result	Position	Pld	W	D*	L	GF	GA
(United States) 2021	Semi-finals	3rd	5	3	1	1	12	6
(Canada) (United States) 2023	Quarter-finals	8th	4	1	1	2	3	7
Total	Semi-finals	2/28	9	4	2	3	15	13

== 2021 CONCACAF Gold Cup ==
=== Group stage ===
Pos	Team	Pld	W	D	L	GF	GA	GD	Pts	Qualification
1	Qatar	3	2	1	0	9	3	+6	7	Advance to knockout stage
2	Honduras	3	2	0	1	7	4	+3	6	Advance to knockout stage
3	Panama	3	1	1	1	8	7	+1	4	
4	Grenada	3	0	0	3	1	11	−10	0	

Source: CONCACAF
Rules for classification: Group stage tiebreakers
13 July 2021
20:50 (19:50 UTC−5) (Note: The Qatar vs Panama match, originally scheduled at 19:00 EDT (UTC−4), was delayed until 20:50 EDT due to thunderstorms in the area.)

Qatar	3–3	Panama
Afif 48'; Ali 53'; Al-Haydos 63' (pen.)	Report	Blackburn 51', 58'; Davis 79' (pen.)

BBVA Stadium, Houston
Attendance: 10,625
Referee: César Ramos (Mexico)

17 July 2021
19:30 (18:30 UTC−5)

Grenada	0–4	Qatar
	Report	Hatem 11'; Afif 22'; Muntari 36'; Ali 46'

BBVA Stadium, Houston
Attendance: 7,173
Referee: Armando Villarreal (United States)

20 July 2021
21:30 (20:30 UTC−5)

Honduras	0–2	Qatar
	Report	Ahmed 25'; Hatem 90+5'

BBVA Stadium, Houston
Attendance: 12,630
Referee: Jair Marrufo (United States)

=== Knockout stage ===
==== Quarter-finals ====
24 July 2021
19:30 (16:30 UTC−7)

Qatar	3–2	El Salvador
Ali 2', 55' (pen.); Hatem 8'	Report	Rivas 63', 66'

State Farm Stadium, Glendale
Attendance: 64,211
Referee: Fernando Hernández (Mexico)

==== Semi-finals ====
29 July 2021
19:30 (18:30 UTC−5)

Qatar	0–1	United States
	Report	Zardes 86'

Q2 Stadium, Austin
Attendance: 20,500
Referee: Juan Gabriel Calderón (Costa Rica)

== 2023 CONCACAF Gold Cup ==
=== Group stage ===
Pos	Team	Pld	W	D	L	GF	GA	GD	Pts	Qualification
1	Mexico	3	2	0	1	7	2	+5	6	Advance to knockout stage
2	Qatar	3	1	1	1	3	3	0	4	Advance to knockout stage
3	Honduras	3	1	1	1	3	6	−3	4	
4	Haiti	3	1	0	2	4	6	−2	3	

Source: CONCACAF
Rules for classification: Tiebreakers
June 25, 2023
18:00 (17:00 UTC-5)

Haiti	2–1	Qatar
Nazon 45+1' (pen.); Pierrot 90+7'	Report	Abdurisag 20'

NRG Stadium, Houston
Attendance: 66,255
Referee: Daneon Parchment (Jamaica)

June 29, 2023
19:45 (16:45 UTC-7)

Qatar	1–1	Honduras
Al-Abdullah 7'	Report	Elis 90+6'

State Farm Stadium, Glendale
Attendance: 34,517
Referee: Armando Villarreal (United States)

July 2, 2023
21:00 (18:00 UTC-7)

Mexico	0–1	Qatar
	Report	Shehata 27'

Levi's Stadium, Santa Clara
Attendance: 60,347
Referee: Drew Fischer (Canada)

=== Knockout stage ===
==== Quarter-finals ====
July 8, 2023
19:00 (18:00 UTC−5)

Panama	4–0	Qatar
Bárcenas 19'; Díaz 56', 63', 65'	Report

AT&T Stadium, Arlington
Attendance: 60,355
Referee: César Ramos (Mexico)

== See also ==
- Qatar at the AFC Asian Cup
- Qatar at the Copa América
- Qatar at the FIFA World Cup

== Head-to-head record ==
Opponent	Pld	W	D	L	GF	GA	GD	Win %
El Salvador	1	1	0	0	3	2	+1	100.00
Grenada	1	1	0	0	4	0	+4	100.00
Haiti	1	0	0	1	1	2	−1	0.00
Honduras	2	1	1	0	3	1	+2	50.00
Mexico	1	1	0	0	1	0	+1	100.00
Panama	2	0	1	1	3	7	−4	0.00
United States	1	0	0	1	0	1	−1	0.00
Total	9	4	2	3	15	13	+2	44.44
