= Qatar at the AFC Asian Cup =

Since the foundation of the AFC Asian Cup was founded in 1956, Qatar has participated in ten Asian Cups between 1980 and 2023. However, prior to the 2019 edition, Qatar only reached the quarter-finals twice, once in 2000 Asian Cup as one of the two best third-place teams when the tournament had only 12 nations competing, and in 2011, when they finished second in Group A behind Uzbekistan.

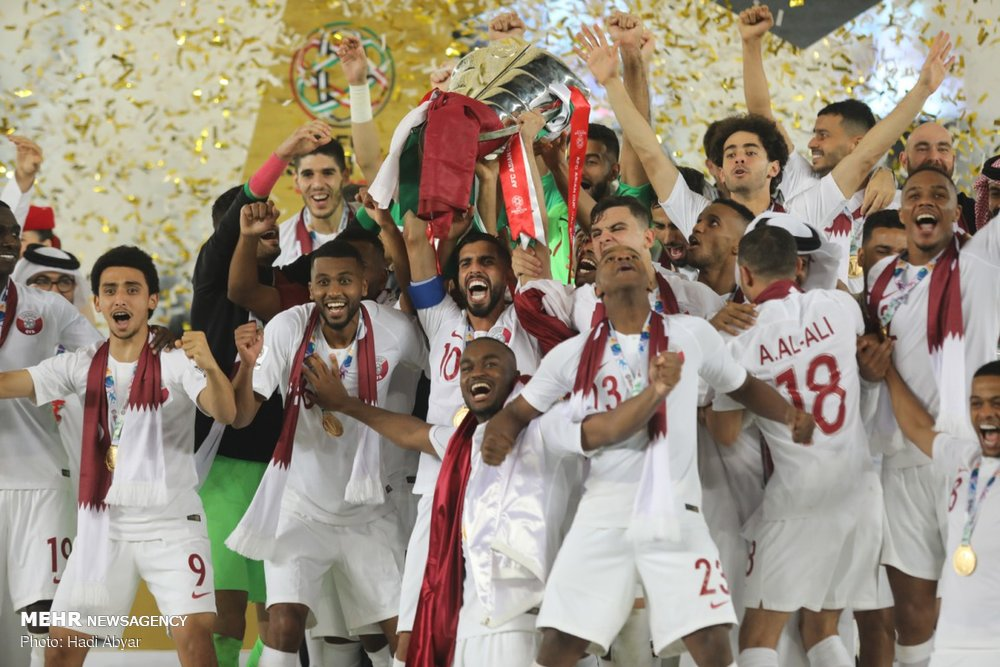
Qatar celebrating their first AFC Asian Cup title

In the 2019 AFC Asian Cup, Qatar, who was the first team to qualify aside from hosts United Arab Emirates, exceeded expectations. Before the 2019 Asian Cup, they last won a game outside Qatar in the 1984 Asian Cup, when Singapore hosted the tournament.

In 2019, Qatar won its first six games, as many games as they had won in the previous nine editions, and conceded zero goals. In the knock-out stage, they defeated Iraq, South Korea, and United Arab Emirates before defeating Japan 3–1 in the final to win the Asian Cup for the first time, which has become Qatar's greatest achievement to date, compared to several Gulf rivals like the United Arab Emirates, Bahrain, Kuwait and Iraq.

In 2023, Qatar won all of its matches in the 2023 Asian Cup group stages, and also conceded zero goals. In the knock-out stage, they faced Palestine, Uzbekistan, and Iran, meeting Jordan in the final beating them 3–1 with Akram Afif scoring a hat-trick of penalties, becoming back-to-back Asian Cup champions.

Qatar has hosted the tournament twice, first for the 1988 Asian Cup and also for the 2011 Asian Cup. The 2011 edition was seen as a step for Qatar in preparation for the 2022 FIFA World Cup which was to be hosted in the country.

Qatar also recently hosted the 2023 Asian Cup where they won on home soil.

== Record ==
AFC Asian Cup record										Qualification record					
Year	Result	Position	Pld	W	D	L	GF	GA	Squad	Pld	W	D	L	GF	GA
(Hong Kong) 1956	Protectorate of United Kingdom									Protectorate of United Kingdom					
(South Korea) 1960	Protectorate of United Kingdom									Protectorate of United Kingdom					
(Israel) 1964	Protectorate of United Kingdom									Protectorate of United Kingdom					
(Iran) 1968	Protectorate of United Kingdom									Protectorate of United Kingdom					
(Thailand) 1972	Protectorate of United Kingdom									Protectorate of United Kingdom					
(Iran) 1976	Did not qualify									6	2	1	3	5	8
(Kuwait) 1980	Group stage	8th	4	1	1	2	3	8	Squad	4	3	1	0	10	2
(Singapore) 1984	Group stage	5th	4	1	2	1	3	3	Squad	4	3	0	1	11	1
(Qatar) 1988	Group stage	5th	4	2	0	2	7	6	Squad	Qualified as hosts					
(Japan) 1992	Group stage	6th	3	0	2	1	3	4	Squad	2	2	0	0	8	2
(United Arab Emirates) 1996	Did not qualify									4	2	0	2	5	4
(Lebanon) 2000	Quarter-finals	8th	4	0	3	1	3	5	Squad	4	3	1	0	11	3
(China) 2004	Group stage	14th	3	0	1	2	2	4	Squad	6	3	2	1	10	7
(Indonesia) (Malaysia) (Thailand) (Vietnam) 2007	Group stage	14th	3	0	2	1	3	4	Squad	6	5	0	1	14	4
(Qatar) 2011	Quarter-finals	7th	4	2	0	2	7	5	Squad	Qualified as hosts					
(Australia) 2015	Group stage	13th	3	0	0	3	2	7	Squad	6	4	1	1	13	2
(United Arab Emirates) 2019	Champions	1st	7	7	0	0	19	1	Squad	8	7	0	1	29	4
(Qatar) 2023	Champions	1st	7	6	1	0	14	5	Squad	8	7	1	0	18	1
(Saudi Arabia) 2027	Qualified									6	5	1	0	18	3
Total	2 Titles	12/14	46	19	12	15	66	52	—	64	46	8	10	163	40

== 1980 edition ==
=== Group B ===
Pos	Team	Pld	W	D	L	GF	GA	GD	Pts	Qualification
1	South Korea	4	3	1	0	10	2	+8	10	Advance to knockout stage
2	Kuwait (H)	4	2	1	1	8	5	+3	7	Advance to knockout stage
3	Malaysia	4	1	2	1	5	5	0	5	
4	Qatar	4	1	1	2	3	8	−5	4	
5	United Arab Emirates	4	0	1	3	3	9	−6	1	

Source: RSSSF
(H) Hosts
17 September 1980

Qatar	2–1	United Arab Emirates
Muftah 50', 60'		Al-Hajri 58'

Sabah Al-Salem Stadium, Kuwait City

19 September 1980
18:30

Qatar	0–2	South Korea
		Lee Jung-il 7'; Choi Soon-ho 21'

Sabah Al-Salem Stadium, Kuwait City
Referee: Vichai Charupunt (Thailand)

23 September 1980

Malaysia	1–1	Qatar
Tukamin

Sabah Al-Salem Stadium, Kuwait City

25 September 1980

Kuwait	4–0	Qatar
Al-Dakhil 32', 57'; Yaqoub 50' (pen.); Al-Anberi 66'

Sabah Al-Salem Stadium, Kuwait City
Attendance: 20,000

== 1984 edition ==
=== Group A ===
Pos	Team	Pld	W	D	L	GF	GA	GD	Pts	Qualification
1	Saudi Arabia	4	2	2	0	4	2	+2	6	Advance to knockout stage
2	Kuwait	4	2	1	1	4	2	+2	5	Advance to knockout stage
3	Qatar	4	1	2	1	3	3	0	4	
4	Syria	4	1	1	2	3	5	−2	3	
5	South Korea	4	0	2	2	1	3	−2	2	

Source: RSSSF
1 December 1984
19:00

Qatar	1–1	Syria
Khalfan 7'		Anber 47' (o.g.)

National Stadium, Singapore
Attendance: 8,000
Referee: Antonio Márquez (Mexico)

3 December 1984
21:00

Kuwait	1–0	Qatar
Al-Rumaihi 52' (o.g.)

National Stadium, Singapore
Attendance: 19,000
Referee: Augusto Lamo (Spain)

8 December 1984
19:00

Qatar	1–1	Saudi Arabia
Zaid 47'		Abduljawad 65'

National Stadium, Singapore
Attendance: 15,000
Referee: Antonio Márquez (Mexico)

10 December 1984
21:00

South Korea	0–1	Qatar
		Salman 69'

National Stadium, Singapore
Attendance: 2,000
Referee: Augusto Lamo (Spain)

== 1988 edition ==
=== Group A ===
Pos	Team	Pld	W	D	L	GF	GA	GD	Pts	Qualification
1	South Korea	4	4	0	0	9	2	+7	8	Advance to knockout stage
2	Iran	4	2	1	1	3	3	0	5	Advance to knockout stage
3	Qatar (H)	4	2	0	2	7	6	+1	4	
4	United Arab Emirates	4	1	0	3	2	4	−2	2	
5	Japan	4	0	1	3	0	6	−6	1	

Source: RSSSF
(H) Hosts
2 December 1988
16:00

Iran	2–0	Qatar
Bavi 6'; Pious 89'	Report

Al-Ahly Stadium, Doha
Attendance: 20,000
Referee: Michel Vautrot (France)

5 December 1988
17:00

Qatar	2–1	United Arab Emirates
Muftah 17'; Musabah 26' (o.g.)	Report	H. Mohamed 35'

Qatar SC Stadium, Doha
Referee: Erik Fredriksson (Sweden)

9 December 1988
17:00

Qatar	2–3	South Korea
Salman 47' (pen.), 80' (pen.)	Report	Chung Hae-Won 10', 72'; Kim Joo-Sung 34'

Qatar SC Stadium, Doha
Referee: George Courtney (England)

12 December 1988
17:00

Japan	0–3	Qatar
	Report	Khamis 58', 82'; Muftah 90'

Al-Ahly Stadium, Doha
Referee: Yusuf Namoğlu (Turkey)

== 1992 edition ==
=== Group B ===
Pos	Team	Pld	W	D	L	GF	GA	GD	Pts	Qualification
1	Saudi Arabia	3	1	2	0	6	2	+4	4	Advance to knockout stage
2	China	3	1	2	0	3	2	+1	4	Advance to knockout stage
3	Qatar	3	0	2	1	3	4	−1	2	
4	Thailand	3	0	2	1	1	5	−4	2	

Source: WorldFootball.net
29 October 1992
19:00

Thailand	1–1	Qatar
Thanis 42'	Report	Soufi 81'

Hiroshima Big Arch, Hiroshima
Attendance: 21,000
Referee: Hossein Khoshkhan (Iran)

31 October 1992
13:00

Saudi Arabia	1–1	Qatar
Al-Muwallid 86'	Report	Mustafa 74'

Hiroshima Stadium, Hiroshima
Attendance: 4,000
Referee: Neji Jouini (Tunisia)

2 November 1992
19:00

Qatar	1–2	China
Al-Sulaiti 20'	Report	Peng Weiguo 44', 58'

Bingo Sports Park, Onomichi
Attendance: 4,500
Referee: Badara Sène (Senegal)

== 2000 edition ==
=== Group C ===
Pos	Team	Pld	W	D	L	GF	GA	GD	Pts	Qualification
1	Japan	3	2	1	0	13	3	+10	7	Advance to knockout stage
2	Saudi Arabia	3	1	1	1	6	4	+2	4	Advance to knockout stage
3	Qatar	3	0	3	0	2	2	0	3	Advance to knockout stage
4	Uzbekistan	3	0	1	2	2	14	−12	1	

Source: RSSSF
14 October 2000
19:45

Qatar	1–1	Uzbekistan
Gholam 61'	Report	Qosimov 73'

Saida Municipal Stadium, Sidon
Attendance: 5,000
Referee: Mohd Nazri Abdullah (Malaysia)

17 October 2000
19:45

Saudi Arabia	0–0	Qatar
	Report

Saida Municipal Stadium, Sidon
Attendance: 5,000
Referee: Tajaddin Fares (Syria)

20 October 2000
19:30

Japan	1–1	Qatar
Nishizawa 61'	Report	Al-Obaidly 22'

Sports City Stadium, Beirut
Attendance: 2,000
Referee: Nabil Ayad (Lebanon)

=== Quarter-finals ===
23 October 2000
19:45

China	3–1	Qatar
Li Ming 9'; Qi Hong 38'; Yang Chen 54'	Report	Al-Enazi 65'

Saida Municipal Stadium, Sidon
Attendance: 3,000
Referee: Mohd Nazri Abdullah (Malaysia)

== 2004 edition ==
=== Group A ===
Pos	Team	Pld	W	D	L	GF	GA	GD	Pts	Qualification
1	China (H)	3	2	1	0	8	2	+6	7	Advance to knockout stage
2	Bahrain	3	1	2	0	6	4	+2	5	Advance to knockout stage
3	Indonesia	3	1	0	2	3	9	−6	3	
4	Qatar	3	0	1	2	2	4	−2	1	

Source: RSSSF
(H) Hosts
18 July 2004
17:00

Qatar	1–2	Indonesia
M. Mohamed 83'	Report	Sudarsono 26'; Astaman 48'

Workers Stadium, Beijing
Attendance: 5,000
Referee: Masoud Moradi (Iran)

21 July 2004
18:30

Bahrain	1–1	Qatar
M. Hubail 90+1'	Report	Rizik 59' (pen.)

Workers Stadium, Beijing
Attendance: 48,000
Referee: Toru Kamikawa (Japan)

25 July 2004
19:00

China	1–0	Qatar
Xu Yunlong 77'	Report

Workers Stadium, Beijing
Attendance: 60,000
Referee: Masoud Moradi (Iran)

== 2007 edition ==
=== Group B ===
Pos	Team	Pld	W	D	L	GF	GA	GD	Pts	Qualification
1	Japan	3	2	1	0	8	3	+5	7	Advance to knockout stage
2	Vietnam (H)	3	1	1	1	4	5	−1	4	Advance to knockout stage
3	United Arab Emirates	3	1	0	2	3	6	−3	3	
4	Qatar	3	0	2	1	3	4	−1	2	

Source: AFC
Rules for classification: Tiebreakers
(H) Hosts
9 July 2007
17:15 UTC+7

Japan	1–1	Qatar
Takahara 61'	Report	Soria 88'

Mỹ Đình Stadium, Hanoi
Attendance: 5,000
Referee: Matthew Breeze (Australia)

12 July 2007
19:30 UTC+7

Qatar	1–1	Vietnam
Soria 79'	Report	Phan Thanh Bình 32'

Mỹ Đình Stadium, Hanoi
Attendance: 40,000
Referee: Masoud Moradi (Iran)

16 July 2007
17:15 UTC+7

Qatar	1–2	United Arab Emirates
Soria 42' (pen.)	Report	Al-Kass 60'; Khalil 90+4'

Quân khu 7 Stadium, Ho Chi Minh City
Attendance: 3,000
Referee: Masoud Moradi (Iran)

== 2011 edition ==
=== Group A ===
Pos	Team	Pld	W	D	L	GF	GA	GD	Pts	Qualification
1	Uzbekistan	3	2	1	0	6	3	+3	7	Advance to knockout stage
2	Qatar (H)	3	2	0	1	5	2	+3	6	Advance to knockout stage
3	China	3	1	1	1	4	4	0	4	
4	Kuwait	3	0	0	3	1	7	−6	0	

Source: AFC
Rules for classification: Tiebreakers
(H) Hosts

7 January 2011
Qatar	0–2	Uzbekistan
12 January 2011
China	0–2	Qatar
16 January 2011
Qatar	3–0	Kuwait

=== Quarter-finals ===
21 January 2011
16:30

Japan	3–2	Qatar
Kagawa 29', 71'; Inoha 89'	Report	Soria 13'; Fábio César 63'

Al-Gharafa Stadium, Doha
Attendance: 19,479
Referee: Subkhiddin Mohd Salleh (Malaysia)

== 2015 edition ==
=== Group C ===
Pos	Team	Pld	W	D	L	GF	GA	GD	Pts	Qualification
1	Iran	3	3	0	0	4	0	+4	9	Advance to knockout stage
2	United Arab Emirates	3	2	0	1	6	3	+3	6	Advance to knockout stage
3	Bahrain	3	1	0	2	3	5	−2	3	
4	Qatar	3	0	0	3	2	7	−5	0	

Source: Asian Cup Australia 2015
Rules for classification: Tiebreakers

11 January 2015
United Arab Emirates	4–1	Qatar	Canberra Stadium, Canberra
15 January 2015
Qatar	0–1	Iran	Stadium Australia, Sydney
19 January 2015
Qatar	1–2	Bahrain	Stadium Australia, Sydney

== 2019 edition ==
=== Group E ===
Pos	Team	Pld	W	D	L	GF	GA	GD	Pts	Qualification
1	Qatar	3	3	0	0	10	0	+10	9	Advance to knockout stage
2	Saudi Arabia	3	2	0	1	6	2	+4	6	Advance to knockout stage
3	Lebanon	3	1	0	2	4	5	−1	3	
4	North Korea	3	0	0	3	1	14	−13	0	

Source: AFC
9 January 2019
20:00

Qatar	2–0	Lebanon
Al-Rawi 65'; Ali 79'	Report

Hazza bin Zayed Stadium, Al Ain
Attendance: 7,847
Referee: Ma Ning (China PR)

13 January 2019
15:00

North Korea	0–6	Qatar
	Report	Ali 9', 11', 55', 60'; Khoukhi 43'; A. Hassan 68'

Khalifa bin Zayed Stadium, Al Ain
Attendance: 452
Referee: Hettikamkanamge Perera (Sri Lanka)

17 January 2019
20:00

Saudi Arabia	0–2	Qatar
	Report	Ali 45+1', 80'

Zayed Sports City Stadium, Abu Dhabi
Attendance: 16,067
Referee: Kim Dong-jin (South Korea)

=== Round of 16 ===
22 January 2019
20:00

Qatar	1–0	Iraq
Al-Rawi 62'	Report

Al Nahyan Stadium, Abu Dhabi
Attendance: 14,701
Referee: Muhammad Taqi (Singapore)

=== Quarter-finals ===
25 January 2019
17:00

South Korea	0–1	Qatar
	Report	Hatem 78'

Zayed Sports City Stadium, Abu Dhabi
Attendance: 13,791
Referee: Ravshan Irmatov (Uzbekistan)

=== Semi-finals ===
29 January 2019
18:00

Qatar	4–0	United Arab Emirates
Khoukhi 22'; Ali 37'; Al-Haydos 80'; Ismail 90+3'	Report

Mohammed bin Zayed Stadium, Abu Dhabi
Attendance: 38,646
Referee: César Ramos (Mexico)

=== Final ===
1 February 2019
18:00

Japan	1–3	Qatar
Minamino 69'	Report	Ali 12'; Hatem 27'; Afif 83' (pen.)

Zayed Sports City Stadium, Abu Dhabi
Attendance: 36,776
Referee: Ravshan Irmatov (Uzbekistan)

== 2023 edition ==
=== Group A ===
Pos	Team	Pld	W	D	L	GF	GA	GD	Pts	Qualification
1	Qatar (H)	3	3	0	0	5	0	+5	9	Advance to knockout stage
2	Tajikistan	3	1	1	1	2	2	0	4	Advance to knockout stage
3	China	3	0	2	1	0	1	−1	2	
4	Lebanon	3	0	1	2	1	5	−4	1	

Source: AFC
(H) Hosts
12 January 2024
19:00

Qatar	3–0	Lebanon
Afif 45', 90+6'; Ali 56'	Report

Lusail Stadium, Lusail
Attendance: 82,490
Referee: Alireza Faghani (Iran)

17 January 2024
17:30

Tajikistan	0–1	Qatar
	Report	Afif 17'

Al Bayt Stadium, Al Khor
Attendance: 57,460
Referee: Hiroyuki Kimura (Japan)

22 January 2024
18:00

Qatar	1–0	China
Al-Haydos 66'	Report

Khalifa International Stadium, Al Rayyan
Attendance: 42,104
Referee: Abdullah Jamali (Kuwait)

=== Knockout stage ===
==== Round of 16 ====
29 January 2024
19:00

Qatar	2–1	Palestine
Al-Haydos 45+6'; Afif 49' (pen.)	Report	Dabbagh 37'

Al Bayt Stadium, Al Khor
Attendance: 63,753
Referee: Ma Ning (China)

==== Quarter-finals ====
3 February 2024
18:30

Qatar	1–1 (a.e.t.)	Uzbekistan
Al-Haydos 27'	Report	Hamrobekov 59'
Penalties
Afif (penalty scored); Ali (penalty missed); Mukhtar (penalty missed); Al-Brake (penalty scored); Ró-Ró (penalty scored)	3–2	(penalty scored) Shukurov; (penalty missed) Ashurmatov; (penalty scored) Umarov; (penalty missed) Abdurakhmatov; (penalty missed) Masharipov

Al Bayt Stadium, Al Khor
Attendance: 58,791
Referee: Kim Hee-gon (South Korea)

==== Semi-finals ====
7 February 2024
18:00

Iran	2–3	Qatar
Azmoun 4'; Jahanbakhsh 51' (pen.)	Report	Gaber 17'; Afif 43'; Ali 82'

Al Thumama Stadium, Doha
Attendance: 40,342
Referee: Ahmad Al-Ali (Kuwait)

==== Final ====
10 February 2024
18:00

Jordan	1–3	Qatar
Al-Naimat 67'	Report	Afif 22' (pen.), 73' (pen.), 90+5' (pen.)

Lusail Stadium, Lusail
Attendance: 86,492
Referee: Ma Ning (China)

== See also ==
- Qatar at the CONCACAF Gold Cup
- Qatar at the Copa América
- Qatar at the FIFA World Cup

== Head-to-head record ==
Opponent	Pld	W	D	L	GF	GA	GD	Win %
Bahrain	2	0	1	1	2	3	−1	0.00
China	5	2	0	3	5	6	−1	40.00
Indonesia	1	0	0	1	1	2	−1	0.00
Iran	3	1	0	2	3	5	−2	33.33
Iraq	1	1	0	0	1	0	+1	100.00
Japan	5	2	2	1	10	6	+4	40.00
Jordan	1	1	0	0	3	1	+2	100.00
Kuwait	3	1	0	2	3	5	−2	33.33
Lebanon	2	2	0	0	5	0	+5	100.00
Malaysia	1	0	1	0	1	1	+0	0.00
North Korea	1	1	0	0	6	0	+6	100.00
Palestine	1	1	0	0	2	1	+1	100.00
Saudi Arabia	4	1	3	0	4	2	+2	25.00
South Korea	4	2	0	2	4	5	−1	50.00
Syria	1	0	1	0	1	1	+0	0.00
Tajikistan	1	1	0	0	1	0	+1	100.00
Thailand	1	0	1	0	1	1	+0	0.00
United Arab Emirates	5	3	0	2	10	8	+2	60.00
Uzbekistan	3	0	2	1	2	4	−2	0.00
Vietnam	1	0	1	0	1	1	+0	0.00
Total	46	19	12	15	66	52	+14	41.30
