= Qatar at the Copa América =

The Copa América is South America's major tournament in senior men's football and determines the continental champion. Until 1967, the tournament was known as South American Championship. It is the oldest continental championship in the world.

Qatar is not member of the South American football confederation CONMEBOL. But because CONMEBOL only has ten member associations, guest nations have been invited since 1993.

== Record at the Copa América ==
Qatar was the second team from outside the Americas to participate in the Copa América, and was invited for the first time in 2019.

CONMEBOL Copa América record
Year	Result	Position	Pld	W	D*	L	GF	GA
(Brazil) 2019	Group stage	10th	3	0	1	2	2	5
(Brazil) 2021	Invited, later withdrew due to rescheduled 2022 FIFA World Cup qualification match.							
Total	Group stage	1/48	3	0	1	2	2	5

Copa América history
Year	Round	Date	Opponent	Result	Stadium
(Brazil) 2019	Group stage	16 June	Paraguay	D 2–2	Estádio do Maracanã, Rio de Janeiro
(Brazil) 2019	Group stage	19 June	Colombia	L 0–1	Estádio do Morumbi, São Paulo
(Brazil) 2019	Group stage	23 June	Argentina	L 0–2	Arena do Grêmio, Porto Alegre

== Head-to-head record ==
Opponent	Pld	W	D	L	GF	GA	GD	Win %
Argentina	1	0	0	1	0	2	−2	0.00
Colombia	1	0	0	1	0	1	−1	0.00
Paraguay	1	0	1	0	2	2	+0	0.00
Total	3	0	1	2	2	5	−3	0.00

== 2019 Copa América ==
Pos	Team	Pld	W	D	L	GF	GA	GD	Pts	Qualification
1	Colombia	3	3	0	0	4	0	+4	9	Advance to knockout stage
2	Argentina	3	1	1	1	3	3	0	4	Advance to knockout stage
3	Paraguay	3	0	2	1	3	4	−1	2	Advance to knockout stage
4	Qatar	3	0	1	2	2	5	−3	1	

Source: CONMEBOL

=== Paraguay vs Qatar ===
16 June 2019
16:00

Paraguay	2–2	Qatar
Cardozo 4' (pen.); González 56'	Report	Ali 68'; R. Rojas 77' (o.g.)

Estádio do Maracanã, Rio de Janeiro
Attendance: 19,196
Referee: Diego Haro (Peru)

Paraguay	Qatar

GK	12	Gatito Fernández
RB	5	Bruno Valdez
CB	13	Júnior Alonso (c)
CB	4	Fabián Balbuena	(yellow card) 80'
LB	18	Santiago Arzamendia
RM	17	Hernán Pérez	(yellow card) 40'	(substituted off) 46'
CM	8	Rodrigo Rojas		(substituted off) 79'
CM	16	Celso Ortiz
LM	23	Miguel Almirón
CF	7	Óscar Cardozo
CF	19	Cecilio Domínguez		(substituted off) 83'
Substitutions:
FW	10	Derlis González		(substituted in) 46'
MF	6	Richard Sánchez		(substituted in) 79'
FW	11	Juan Iturbe		(substituted in) 83'
Manager:
(Argentina) Eduardo Berizzo

GK	1	Saad Al Sheeb
RB	15	Bassam Al-Rawi
CB	2	Ró-Ró
CB	3	Abdelkarim Hassan	(yellow card) 61'
LB	16	Boualem Khoukhi	(yellow card) 71'
CM	5	Tarek Salman	(yellow card) 26'
CM	6	Abdulaziz Hatem		(substituted off) 88'
CM	10	Hassan Al-Haydos (c)
RF	23	Assim Madibo	(yellow card) 11'
CF	19	Almoez Ali
LF	11	Akram Afif
Substitutions:
MF	12	Karim Boudiaf		(substituted in) 88'
Manager:
(Spain) Félix Sánchez

Man of the Match:
Gatito Fernández (Paraguay)

Assistant referees:
Jonny Bossio (Peru)
Víctor Ráez (Peru)
Fourth official:
Esteban Ostojich (Uruguay)
Video assistant referee:
Raphael Claus (Brazil)
Assistant video assistant referees:
Víctor Carrillo (Peru)
Byron Romero (Ecuador)

=== Colombia vs Qatar ===
19 June 2019
18:30

Colombia	1–0	Qatar
D. Zapata 86'	Report

Estádio do Morumbi, São Paulo
Attendance: 22,079
Referee: Alexis Herrera (Venezuela)

Colombia	Qatar

GK	1	David Ospina
RB	3	Stefan Medina		(substituted off) 46'
CB	13	Yerry Mina
CB	23	Davinson Sánchez
LB	6	William Tesillo
CM	11	Juan Cuadrado		(substituted off) 64'
CM	5	Wílmar Barrios
CM	15	Mateus Uribe	(yellow card) 73'
RF	20	Roger Martínez		(substituted off) 75'
CF	7	Duván Zapata
LF	10	James Rodríguez (c)
Substitutions:
DF	4	Santiago Arias		(substituted in) 46'
FW	9	Radamel Falcao		(substituted in) 64'
FW	14	Luis Díaz		(substituted in) 75'
Manager:
(Portugal) Carlos Queiroz

GK	1	Saad Al Sheeb
CB	15	Bassam Al-Rawi
CB	16	Boualem Khoukhi
CB	5	Tarek Salman
DM	23	Assim Madibo	(yellow card) 44'
CM	10	Hassan Al-Haydos (c)		(substituted off) 84'
CM	6	Abdulaziz Hatem		(substituted off) 66'
RW	2	Ró-Ró	(yellow card) 73'
LW	3	Abdelkarim Hassan	(yellow card) 57'
SS	11	Akram Afif	(yellow card) 83'
CF	19	Almoez Ali
Substitutions:
MF	12	Karim Boudiaf		(substituted in) 66'
MF	17	Ahmed Moein		(substituted in) 84'
Manager:
(Spain) Félix Sánchez

Man of the Match:
James Rodríguez (Colombia)

Assistant referees:
Luis Murillo (Venezuela)
Nicolás Taran (Uruguay)
Fourth official:
Víctor Carrillo (Peru)
Video assistant referee:
Jesús Valenzuela (Venezuela)
Assistant video assistant referees:
Anderson Daronco (Brazil)
Richard Trinidad (Uruguay)

=== Qatar vs Argentina ===
23 June 2019
16:00

Qatar	0–2	Argentina
	Report	Martínez 4'; Agüero 82'

Arena do Grêmio, Porto Alegre
Attendance: 41,390
Referee: Julio Bascuñán (Chile)

Qatar	Argentina

GK	1	Saad Al Sheeb
SW	15	Bassam Al-Rawi
CB	16	Boualem Khoukhi
CB	14	Salem Al-Hajri		(substituted off) 76'
RWB	2	Ró-Ró		(substituted off) 84'
LWB	5	Tarek Salman
CM	10	Hassan Al-Haydos (c)
CM	12	Karim Boudiaf	(yellow card) 74'
CM	6	Abdulaziz Hatem
SS	11	Akram Afif
CF	19	Almoez Ali	(yellow card) 50'
Substitutions:
MF	9	Abdullah Al-Ahrak	(yellow card) 88'	(substituted in) 76'
DF	8	Hamid Ismail		(substituted in) 84'
Manager:
(Spain) Félix Sánchez

GK	1	Franco Armani
RB	4	Renzo Saravia
CB	2	Juan Foyth	(yellow card) 44'	(substituted off) 84'
CB	17	Nicolás Otamendi
LB	3	Nicolás Tagliafico
CM	16	Rodrigo De Paul
CM	5	Leandro Paredes
CM	20	Giovani Lo Celso	(yellow card) 41'	(substituted off) 54'
AM	10	Lionel Messi (c)
CF	22	Lautaro Martínez		(substituted off) 75'
CF	9	Sergio Agüero
Substitutions:
MF	8	Marcos Acuña		(substituted in) 54'
FW	21	Paulo Dybala		(substituted in) 75'
DF	6	Germán Pezzella		(substituted in) 84'
Manager:
Lionel Scaloni			(yellow card) 65'

Man of the Match:
Lionel Messi (Argentina)

Assistant referees:
Christian Schiemann (Chile)
Claudio Ríos (Chile)
Fourth official:
Roddy Zambrano (Ecuador)
Video assistant referee:
Roberto Tobar (Chile)
Assistant video assistant referees:
Gery Vargas (Bolivia)
Christian Lescano (Ecuador)

== See also ==
- Qatar at the AFC Asian Cup
- Qatar at the CONCACAF Gold Cup
- Qatar at the FIFA World Cup
