= Qatar at the FIFA World Cup =

International football delegation

Prior to qualifying as host nation, Qatar had never qualified for the FIFA World Cup since the country's independence in 1971. While Qatar has been a regular participant in the continental AFC Asian Cup, the national side has always fallen short in the final stage of World Cup campaigns. By hosting the 2022 FIFA World Cup and its failure to qualify for the 2018 FIFA World Cup held in Russia, Qatar became the only nation to play in a World Cup without qualifying for it and the second nation after Italy (back in 1934) to qualify for the World Cup as hosts after being absent in all previous World Cups before.

Qatar's national team showed some improvement in their performance since the country was awarded the tournament, including winning the 2019 AFC Asian Cup, and in 2019 Copa América drew against former champions and World Cup quarter-finalists Paraguay with 2–2.

At rank 50, Qatar entered the tournament as the third lowest ranked team of the total 32; placing higher only above Saudi Arabia and Ghana. The nation performed poorly and set some upsetting records among host nations in the process. Qatar became the first host nation to lose not only its opening match, but also all three of its matches. Upon losing the second match against Senegal with a score of 3–1, Qatar became the first host nation to be eliminated from the tournament with a group game remaining after the Netherlands later on drew with Ecuador (putting both with four points, Senegal with three and Qatar with zero). Qatar also finished last in their group by failing to secure any point, making them the first host nation to have 0 points at the end of the group stage. The nation thereby became the worst performing host nation in the history of the tournament, overtaking South Africa, who had finished third in their group with 4 points and were eliminated based on goal difference.

On 14 October 2025, Qatar secured qualification for the 2026 FIFA World Cup after defeating the United Arab Emirates 2–1 in Doha, marking their first-ever qualification for a World Cup through the standard AFC qualification process, having previously participated in 2022 as hosts.

== Record at the FIFA World Cup ==
=== Overall record ===
FIFA World Cup record									Qualification record					
Year	Result	Position	Pld	W	D*	L	GF	GA	Pld	W	D	L	GF	GA
(Uruguay) 1930	Did not enter								Did not enter					
(Italy) 1934	Did not enter								Did not enter					
(France) 1938	Did not enter								Did not enter					
(Brazil) 1950	Did not enter								Did not enter					
(Switzerland) 1954	Did not enter								Did not enter					
(Sweden) 1958	Did not enter								Did not enter					
(Chile) 1962	Did not enter								Did not enter					
(England) 1966	Did not enter								Did not enter					
(Mexico) 1970	Did not enter								Did not enter					
(West Germany) 1974	Withdrew								Withdrew					
(Argentina) 1978	Did not qualify								4	1	0	3	3	9
(Spain) 1982	Did not qualify								4	2	0	2	5	3
(Mexico) 1986	Did not qualify								4	2	0	2	6	3
(Italy) 1990	Did not qualify								11	4	6	1	12	8
(United States) 1994	Did not qualify								8	5	1	2	22	8
(France) 1998	Did not qualify								11	6	1	4	21	10
(South Korea) (Japan) 2002	Did not qualify								14	7	4	3	24	13
(Germany) 2006	Did not qualify								6	3	0	3	16	8
(South Africa) 2010	Did not qualify								16	6	4	6	16	20
(Brazil) 2014	Did not qualify								14	5	5	4	18	14
(Russia) 2018	Did not qualify								16	9	1	6	35	14
(Qatar) 2022	Group stage	32nd	3	0	0	3	1	7	8	7	1	0	18	1
(Canada) (Mexico) (United States) 2026	Group stage	41st	3	0	1	2	2	10	18	10	3	5	38	29
(Morocco) (Portugal) (Spain) 2030	To be determined								To be determined					
(Saudi Arabia) 2034	To be determined								To be determined					
Total	Group stage	2/23	6	0	1	5	3	17	134	67	26	41	238	154

=== By match ===
World Cup	Round	Opponent	Score	Result	Venue	Qatar scorers
2022	Group stage	Ecuador	0–2	L	Al Khor	—
2022	Group stage	Senegal	1–3	L	Doha	Muntari
2022	Group stage	Netherlands	0–2	L	Al Khor	—
2026	Group stage	Switzerland	1–1	D	Santa Clara	Muheim (o.g.)
2026	Group stage	Canada	0–6	L	Vancouver	—
2026	Group stage	Bosnia and Herzegovina	1–3	L	Seattle	Al-Haydos

== Qatar 2022 ==
=== Group stage ===
Pos	Team	Pld	W	D	L	GF	GA	GD	Pts	Qualification
1	Netherlands	3	2	1	0	5	1	+4	7	Advance to knockout stage
2	Senegal	3	2	0	1	5	4	+1	6	Advance to knockout stage
3	Ecuador	3	1	1	1	4	3	+1	4	
4	Qatar (H)	3	0	0	3	1	7	−6	0	

Source: FIFA
Rules for classification: Group stage tiebreakers
(H) Hosts
20 November 2022
19:00

Qatar	0–2	Ecuador
		Valencia 16' (pen.), 31'

Al Bayt Stadium, Al Khor
Attendance: 67,372
Referee: Daniele Orsato (Italy)

25 November 2022
16:00

Qatar	1–3	Senegal
Muntari 78'		Dia 41'; Diédhiou 48'; B. Dieng 84'

Al Thumama Stadium, Doha
Attendance: 41,797
Referee: Antonio Mateu Lahoz (Spain)

29 November 2022
18:00

Netherlands	2–0	Qatar
Gakpo 26'; F. de Jong 49'

Al Bayt Stadium, Al Khor
Attendance: 66,784
Referee: Bakary Gassama (Gambia)

== Canada/Mexico/United States 2026 ==
=== Group stage ===
Pos	Team	Pld	W	D	L	GF	GA	GD	Pts	Qualification
1	Switzerland	3	2	1	0	7	3	+4	7	Advance to knockout stage
2	Canada (H)	3	1	1	1	8	3	+5	4 (Note: Tied on head-to-head result (Canada 1–1 Bosnia and Herzegovina). Overall goal difference was used as the tiebreaker.)	Advance to knockout stage
3	Bosnia and Herzegovina	3	1	1	1	5	6	−1	4	Advance to knockout stage
4	Qatar	3	0	1	2	2	10	−8	1	

Source: FIFA
Rules for classification: Group stage tiebreakers
(H) Hosts
Notes:
June 13, 2026
12:00 p.m. UTC−7

Qatar	1–1	Switzerland
Muheim 90+4' (o.g.)	(Note: "Qatar vs Switzerland | First Stage | FIFA World Cup 2026". FIFA. Retrieved June 13, 2026.; "Match Report – Group B – Qatar v. Switzerland". FIFA. June 13, 2026. Retrieved June 13, 2026.; "Post match summary report – Group B – Qatar v. Switzerland". FIFA. June 13, 2026. Retrieved June 14, 2026.)	Embolo 17' (pen.)

Levi's Stadium, Santa Clara
Attendance: 67,966
Referee: Saíd Martínez (Honduras)

June 18, 2026
3:00 p.m. UTC−7

Canada	6–0	Qatar
Larin 16'; J. David 29', 45+3', 90+2'; Saliba 64'; Manai 75' (o.g.)	(Note: "Canada vs Qatar | First Stage | FIFA World Cup 2026". FIFA. Retrieved June 19, 2026.; "Match Report – Group B – Canada v. Qatar". FIFA. June 19, 2026. Retrieved June 19, 2026.; "Post match summary report – Group B – Canada v. Qatar". FIFA. June 18, 2026. Retrieved June 19, 2026.)

BC Place, Vancouver
Attendance: 52,497
Referee: Cristián Garay (Chile)

June 24, 2026
12:00 p.m. UTC−7

Bosnia and Herzegovina	3–1	Qatar
Alajbegović 29'; Abunada 34' (o.g.); Mahmić 80'	(Note: "Bosnia and Herzegovina vs Qatar | First Stage | FIFA World Cup 2026". FIFA. Retrieved June 24, 2026.; "Match Report – Group B – Bosnia and Herzegovina v. Qatar". FIFA. June 24, 2026. Retrieved June 24, 2026.; "Post match summary report – Group B – Bosnia and Herzegovina v. Qatar". FIFA. June 25, 2026. Retrieved June 25, 2026.)	Al-Haydos 42'

Lumen Field, Seattle
Attendance: 66,925
Referee: Jesús Valenzuela (Venezuela)

== Player records ==
=== Most appearances ===
Rank	Player	Matches	World Cups
1	Akram Afif	6	2022 and 2026
1	Boualem Khoukhi	6	2022 and 2026
1	Pedro Miguel	6	2022 and 2026
4	Homam Ahmed	5	2022 and 2026
4	Hassan Al-Haydos	5	2022 and 2026
4	Karim Boudiaf	5	2022 and 2026
7	Almoez Ali	4	2022 and 2026
7	Abdulaziz Hatem	4	2022 and 2026
7	Assim Madibo	4	2022 and 2026

=== Goalscorers ===
On 25 November 2022, Mohammed Muntari scored Qatar's first-ever FIFA World Cup goal, netting on home soil against Senegal in Doha.

Player	Goals	2022	2026
Mohammed Muntari	1	1	
Hassan Al-Haydos	1		1
Own goals	1		1
Total	3	1	2

== Head-to-head record ==
Opponent	Pld	W	D	L	GF	GA	GD	Win %
Bosnia and Herzegovina	1	0	0	1	1	3	−2	0.00
Canada	1	0	0	1	0	6	−6	0.00
Ecuador	1	0	0	1	0	2	−2	0.00
Netherlands	1	0	0	1	0	2	−2	0.00
Senegal	1	0	0	1	1	3	−2	0.00
Switzerland	1	0	1	0	1	1	+0	0.00
Total	6	0	1	5	3	17	−14	0.00

== See also ==
- Asian nations at the FIFA World Cup
- Qatar at the AFC Asian Cup
- Qatar at the CONCACAF Gold Cup
- Qatar at the Copa América
