= 2022 FIFA World Cup Group A =

FIFA World Cup group

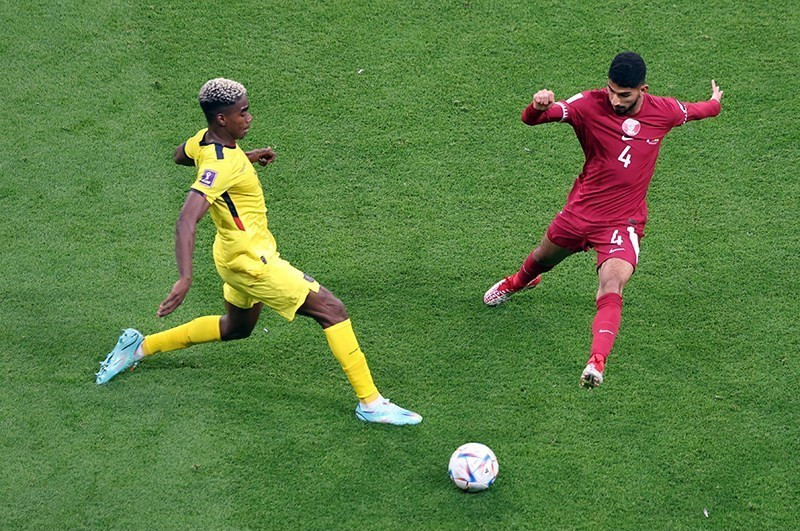
Ecuador beat host nation Qatar 2–0 in the tournament's opening match.

Group A of the 2022 FIFA World Cup took place from 20 to 29 November 2022. The group consisted of the host nation Qatar as well as Ecuador, Senegal and the Netherlands. The top two teams, the Netherlands and Senegal, advanced to the round of 16. The Netherlands won the group with three group game victories, Senegal finished as runners-up with two of them, Ecuador finished third, having won one game, while Qatar finished fourth without registering a single point.

Qatar became the first host nation to lose every group match (every other host had won a match and not lose their opener).

== Teams ==
Draw position	Team	Pot	Confederation	Method of qualification	Date of qualification	Finals appearance	Last appearance	Previous best performance	FIFA Rankings	
Draw position	Team	Pot	Confederation	Method of qualification	Date of qualification	Finals appearance	Last appearance	Previous best performance	March 2022 (Note: The rankings of March 2022 were used for seeding for the final draw.)	October 2022
A1	Qatar	1	AFC	Hosts	2 December 2010	1st	—	—	51	50
A2	Ecuador	4	CONMEBOL	CONMEBOL round robin fourth place	24 March 2022	4th	2014	Round of 16 (2006)	46	44
A3	Senegal	3	CAF	CAF third round winners	29 March 2022	3rd	2018	Quarter-finals (2002)	20	18
A4	Netherlands	2	UEFA	UEFA Group G winners	16 November 2021	11th	2014	Runners-up (1974, 1978, 2010)	10	8

== Standings ==
Pos	Team	Pld	W	D	L	GF	GA	GD	Pts	Qualification
1	Netherlands	3	2	1	0	5	1	+4	7	Advance to knockout stage
2	Senegal	3	2	0	1	5	4	+1	6	Advance to knockout stage
3	Ecuador	3	1	1	1	4	3	+1	4	
4	Qatar (H)	3	0	0	3	1	7	−6	0	

Source: FIFA
Rules for classification: Group stage tiebreakers
(H) Hosts

In the round of 16:

- The winners of Group A, the Netherlands, advanced to play the runners-up of Group B, the United States.
- The runners-up of Group A, Senegal, advanced to play the winners of Group B, England.

== Matches ==
All times listed are local, AST (UTC+3).

The match between Senegal and the Netherlands was originally scheduled to be the opening match of the tournament on 21 November 2022, 13:00, while the match between Qatar and Ecuador would take place later that day at 19:00. However, FIFA adjusted the match schedule on 11 August 2022, moving the Qatar–Ecuador fixture to 20 November in order for the hosts to feature in the opening match of the tournament. As a result, the Senegal–Netherlands fixture was pushed back to 19:00 on 21 November.

=== Qatar vs Ecuador ===
The two teams had faced each other three times, most recently in 2018, a 4–3 win for Qatar in a friendly game. This was their first competitive meeting.

Ecuador had a disallowed goal in the opening minutes, but eventually won the match 2–0 with a brace by Enner Valencia. Valencia opened the scoring in the 16th minute with a penalty, shooting low to the right corner after being brought down in the penalty area by Qatar goalkeeper Saad Al-Sheeb. He scored his second in the 31st minute with a downward header to the left corner of the net after a cross in from the right by Ángelo Preciado.

This was the third consecutive FIFA World Cup in which a player scored a brace in the opening match, after Brazil's Neymar in 2014 and Russia's Denis Cheryshev in 2018. This was also the first time a penalty kick had been scored as the opening goal of a World Cup. Qatar became the 14th debutant to lose their opening fixture; additionally, they became the first host nation to lose their opening match at a World Cup.

20 November 2022
19:00

Qatar	0–2	Ecuador
		Valencia 16' (pen.), 31'

Al Bayt Stadium, Al Khor
Attendance: 67,372
Referee: Daniele Orsato (Italy)

Qatar	Ecuador

GK	1	Saad Al-Sheeb	(yellow card) 15'
CB	15	Bassam Al-Rawi
CB	16	Boualem Khoukhi
CB	3	Abdelkarim Hassan
RWB	2	Pedro Miguel
LWB	14	Homam Ahmed
CM	10	Hassan Al-Haydos (c)		(substituted off) 72'
CM	12	Karim Boudiaf	(yellow card) 36'
CM	6	Abdulaziz Hatem
CF	19	Almoez Ali	(yellow card) 22'	(substituted off) 72'
CF	11	Akram Afif	(yellow card) 78'
Substitutions:
FW	9	Mohammed Muntari		(substituted on) 72'
DF	4	Mohammed Waad		(substituted on) 72'
Manager:
(Spain) Félix Sánchez

GK	1	Hernán Galíndez
RB	17	Ángelo Preciado
CB	2	Félix Torres
CB	3	Piero Hincapié
LB	7	Pervis Estupiñán
RM	19	Gonzalo Plata
CM	20	Jhegson Méndez	(yellow card) 56'
CM	23	Moisés Caicedo	(yellow card) 29'	(substituted off) 90'
LM	10	Romario Ibarra		(substituted off) 68'
CF	13	Enner Valencia (c)		(substituted off) 77'
CF	11	Michael Estrada		(substituted off) 90'
Substitutions:
MF	16	Jeremy Sarmiento		(substituted on) 68'
MF	5	José Cifuentes		(substituted on) 77'
FW	26	Kevin Rodríguez		(substituted on) 90'
MF	21	Alan Franco		(substituted on) 90'
Manager:
(Argentina) Gustavo Alfaro

Man of the Match:
Enner Valencia (Ecuador)

Assistant referees:
Ciro Carbone (Italy)
Alessandro Giallatini (Italy)
Fourth official:
István Kovács (Romania)
Reserve assistant referee:
Ovidiu Artene (Romania)
Video assistant referee:
Massimiliano Irrati (Italy)
Assistant video assistant referees:
Paolo Valeri (Italy)
Tomasz Listkiewicz (Poland)
Benoît Millot (France)
Stand-by assistant video assistant referee:
Paweł Sokolnicki (Poland)

=== Senegal vs Netherlands ===
The teams had never met before.

After a goalless first half, Cody Gakpo put the Netherlands ahead in the 84th minute when he got to the ball first to head past the advancing goalkeeper Édouard Mendy and into the empty net after a cross from Frenkie de Jong. In stoppage time, Davy Klaassen made it 2–0 when he followed up on Memphis Depay's saved shot to slot into the net.

21 November 2022
19:00

Senegal	0–2	Netherlands
		Gakpo 84'; Klaassen 90+9'

Al Thumama Stadium, Doha
Attendance: 41,721
Referee: Wilton Sampaio (Brazil)

Senegal	Netherlands

GK	16	Édouard Mendy
RB	21	Youssouf Sabaly
CB	3	Kalidou Koulibaly (c)
CB	4	Pape Abou Cissé
LB	22	Abdou Diallo		(substituted off) 62'
CM	8	Cheikhou Kouyaté		(substituted off) 73'
CM	6	Nampalys Mendy	(yellow card) 90+4'
RW	15	Krépin Diatta		(substituted off) 73'
AM	5	Idrissa Gueye	(yellow card) 90+6'
LW	18	Ismaïla Sarr
CF	9	Boulaye Dia		(substituted off) 69'
Substitutions:
DF	14	Ismail Jakobs		(substituted on) 62'
FW	20	Bamba Dieng		(substituted on) 69'
MF	26	Pape Gueye		(substituted on) 73'
FW	7	Nicolas Jackson		(substituted on) 73'
Manager:
Aliou Cissé

GK	23	Andries Noppert
CB	3	Matthijs de Ligt	(yellow card) 56'
CB	4	Virgil van Dijk (c)
CB	5	Nathan Aké
RWB	22	Denzel Dumfries
LWB	17	Daley Blind
CM	11	Steven Berghuis		(substituted off) 79'
CM	21	Frenkie de Jong
AM	8	Cody Gakpo		(substituted off) 90+4'
CF	18	Vincent Janssen		(substituted off) 62'
CF	7	Steven Bergwijn		(substituted off) 79'
Substitutions:
FW	10	Memphis Depay		(substituted on) 62'
MF	14	Davy Klaassen		(substituted on) 79'
MF	20	Teun Koopmeiners		(substituted on) 79'
MF	15	Marten de Roon		(substituted on) 90+4'
Manager:
Louis van Gaal

Man of the Match:
Cody Gakpo (Netherlands)

Assistant referees:
Bruno Boschilia (Brazil)
Bruno Pires (Brazil)
Fourth official:
Andrés Matonte (Uruguay)
Reserve assistant referee:
Nicolás Taran (Uruguay)
Video assistant referee:
Juan Soto (Venezuela)
Assistant video assistant referees:
Nicolás Gallo (Colombia)
Diego Bonfá (Argentina)
Mauro Vigliano (Argentina)
Stand-by assistant video assistant referee:
Ezequiel Brailovsky (Argentina)

=== Qatar vs Senegal ===
The two teams had never met before, though the match was unique for being the first time ever the Asian champions faced the African champions at a FIFA World Cup.

Boulaye Dia put Senegal in front in the 41st minute, with a low finish to the left corner of the net after a mistake by Qatar defender Boualem Khoukhi. Seven minutes later, Famara Diédhiou doubled Senegal's lead with a header from a corner taken by Ismail Jakobs. Mohammed Muntari pulled one back for Qatar in the 78th minute, the nation's first ever World Cup goal, with a header to the left corner after a cross from Ismaeel Mohammad. Bamba Dieng scored a third for Senegal in the 84th minute with a deflected shot to the net after a pass from Iliman Ndiaye on the right.

Following the Netherlands' 1–1 draw with Ecuador played after this match, Qatar became the first host country to be eliminated from the group stage of the FIFA World Cup after just two games, and the second hosts after South Africa in 2010 to fail to progress to the second round. This loss also confirmed Qatar as the worst hosts by performance, as they could secure no more than three points, one short of South Africa's four.

25 November 2022
16:00

Qatar	1–3	Senegal
Muntari 78'		Dia 41'; Diédhiou 48'; B. Dieng 84'

Al Thumama Stadium, Doha
Attendance: 41,797
Referee: Antonio Mateu Lahoz (Spain)

Qatar	Senegal

GK	22	Meshaal Barsham
CB	2	Pedro Miguel		(substituted off) 83'
CB	16	Boualem Khoukhi
CB	3	Abdelkarim Hassan
RWB	17	Ismaeel Mohammad	(yellow card) 20'
LWB	14	Homam Ahmed	(yellow card) 45+2'	(substituted off) 83'
CM	12	Karim Boudiaf		(substituted off) 69'
CM	10	Hassan Al-Haydos (c)		(substituted off) 74'
CM	23	Assim Madibo	(yellow card) 90+1'
CF	19	Almoez Ali
CF	11	Akram Afif
Substitutions:
MF	6	Abdulaziz Hatem		(substituted on) 69'
FW	9	Mohammed Muntari		(substituted on) 74'
DF	4	Mohammed Waad		(substituted on) 83'
DF	5	Tarek Salman		(substituted on) 83'
Manager:
(Spain) Félix Sánchez

GK	16	Édouard Mendy
RB	21	Youssouf Sabaly
CB	3	Kalidou Koulibaly (c)
CB	22	Abdou Diallo
LB	14	Ismail Jakobs	(yellow card) 52'	(substituted off) 78'
RM	18	Ismaïla Sarr		(substituted off) 74'
CM	6	Nampalys Mendy		(substituted off) 78'
CM	5	Idrissa Gueye
LM	15	Krépin Diatta		(substituted off) 64'
CF	9	Boulaye Dia	(yellow card) 30'
CF	19	Famara Diédhiou		(substituted off) 74'
Substitutions:
MF	11	Pathé Ciss	(yellow card) 87'	(substituted on) 64'
FW	13	Iliman Ndiaye		(substituted on) 74'
FW	20	Bamba Dieng		(substituted on) 74'
DF	4	Pape Abou Cissé		(substituted on) 78'
MF	17	Pape Matar Sarr		(substituted on) 78'
Manager:
Aliou Cissé

Man of the Match:
Boulaye Dia (Senegal)

Assistant referees:
Pau Cebrián Devís (Spain)
Roberto Díaz Pérez del Palomar (Spain)
Fourth official:
Kevin Ortega (Peru)
Reserve assistant referee:
Djibril Camara (Senegal)
Video assistant referee:
Drew Fischer (Canada)
Assistant video assistant referees:
Fernando Guerrero (Mexico)
Nicolás Taran (Uruguay)
Adil Zourak (Morocco)
Stand-by assistant video assistant referee:
Bruno Pires (Brazil)

=== Netherlands vs Ecuador ===
The two teams had faced each other twice, most recently in 2014, a 1–1 draw in a friendly.

In the sixth minute of the match, Cody Gakpo cut inside and shot into the left corner of the net from just outside the penalty area to put the Netherlands in front. Just before the first half ended, Ecuadorian defender Pervis Estupiñán deflected his teammate's shot in, but the goal was called offside. Four minutes into the second half, Enner Valencia scored his third goal of the tournament to equalize for Ecuador, converting the rebound after goalkeeper Andries Noppert had saved a shot from Estupiñán. Despite Ecuador later hitting the crossbar, the game saw no further goals and ended in a 1–1 draw.

25 November 2022
19:00

Netherlands	1–1	Ecuador
Gakpo 6'		Valencia 49'

Khalifa International Stadium, Al Rayyan
Attendance: 44,833
Referee: Mustapha Ghorbal (Algeria)

Netherlands	Ecuador

GK	23	Andries Noppert
CB	2	Jurriën Timber
CB	4	Virgil van Dijk (c)
CB	5	Nathan Aké
RWB	22	Denzel Dumfries
LWB	17	Daley Blind
CM	20	Teun Koopmeiners	(substituted off) 79'
CM	21	Frenkie de Jong
AM	14	Davy Klaassen	(substituted off) 69'
CF	8	Cody Gakpo	(substituted off) 79'
CF	7	Steven Bergwijn	(substituted off) 46'
Substitutions:
FW	10	Memphis Depay	(substituted on) 46'
MF	11	Steven Berghuis	(substituted on) 69'
FW	19	Wout Weghorst	(substituted on) 79'
MF	15	Marten de Roon	(substituted on) 79'
Manager:
Louis van Gaal

GK	1	Hernán Galíndez
CB	25	Jackson Porozo
CB	2	Félix Torres
CB	3	Piero Hincapié
RM	17	Ángelo Preciado
CM	20	Jhegson Méndez	(yellow card) 57'
CM	23	Moisés Caicedo
LM	7	Pervis Estupiñán
AM	19	Gonzalo Plata		(substituted off) 90'
AM	13	Enner Valencia (c)		(substituted off) 90'
CF	11	Michael Estrada		(substituted off) 74'
Substitutions:
MF	16	Jeremy Sarmiento		(substituted on) 74'
MF	10	Romario Ibarra		(substituted on) 90'
FW	26	Kevin Rodríguez		(substituted on) 90'
Manager:
(Argentina) Gustavo Alfaro

Man of the Match:
Frenkie de Jong (Netherlands)

Assistant referees:
Mokrane Gourari (Algeria)
Abdelhak Etchiali (Algeria)
Fourth official:
Saíd Martínez (Honduras)
Reserve assistant referee:
Helpys Raymundo Feliz (Dominican Republic)
Video assistant referee:
Shaun Evans (Australia)
Assistant video assistant referees:
Redouane Jiyed (Morocco)
Ashley Beecham (Australia)
Muhammad Taqi (Singapore)
Stand-by assistant video assistant referee:
Anton Shchetinin (Australia)

=== Ecuador vs Senegal ===
The two teams had faced each other twice, most recently in 2005, a 2–1 win for Senegal in a friendly.

In the 44th minute, Senegal's Ismaïla Sarr was fouled in the penalty area by Piero Hincapié, with Sarr scoring the resulting penalty low to the right corner. In the 67th minute, Moisés Caicedo put Ecuador level when he finished from close range after the ball had reached him from a Félix Torres corner. With twenty minutes left in the match, captain Kalidou Koulibaly scored his first ever international goal with a volley from six yards out to put Senegal back in front.

Ecuador's loss eliminated them in the group stage for a third time after 2002 and 2014, while Senegal advanced to the knockout stage for a second time and the first since 2002.

29 November 2022
18:00

Ecuador	1–2	Senegal
Caicedo 67'		I. Sarr 44' (pen.); Koulibaly 70'

Khalifa International Stadium, Al Rayyan
Attendance: 44,569
Referee: Clément Turpin (France)

Ecuador	Senegal

GK	1	Hernán Galíndez
RB	17	Ángelo Preciado	(substituted off) 85'
CB	2	Félix Torres
CB	3	Piero Hincapié
LB	7	Pervis Estupiñán
DM	8	Carlos Gruezo	(substituted off) 46'
CM	21	Alan Franco	(substituted off) 46'
CM	23	Moisés Caicedo
RF	19	Gonzalo Plata
CF	11	Michael Estrada	(substituted off) 64'
LF	13	Enner Valencia (c)
Substitutions:
MF	5	José Cifuentes	(substituted on) 46'
MF	16	Jeremy Sarmiento	(substituted on) 46'
FW	24	Djorkaeff Reasco	(substituted on) 64'
DF	25	Jackson Porozo	(substituted on) 85'
Manager:
(Argentina) Gustavo Alfaro

GK	16	Édouard Mendy
RB	21	Youssouf Sabaly
CB	3	Kalidou Koulibaly (c)
CB	22	Abdou Diallo
LB	14	Ismail Jakobs
CM	11	Pathé Ciss		(substituted off) 74'
CM	26	Pape Gueye
RW	13	Iliman Ndiaye		(substituted off) 74'
AM	5	Idrissa Gueye	(yellow card) 66'
LW	18	Ismaïla Sarr
CF	9	Boulaye Dia		(substituted off) 90+5'
Substitutions:
MF	6	Nampalys Mendy		(substituted on) 74'
FW	20	Bamba Dieng		(substituted on) 74'
DF	4	Pape Abou Cissé		(substituted on) 90+5'
Manager:
Aliou Cissé

Man of the Match:
Kalidou Koulibaly (Senegal)

Assistant referees:
Nicolas Danos (France)
Cyril Gringore (France)
Fourth official:
István Kovács (Romania)
Reserve assistant referee:
Ovidiu Artene (Romania)
Video assistant referee:
Jérôme Brisard (France)
Assistant video assistant referees:
Benoît Millot (France)
Ciro Carbone (Italy)
Drew Fischer (Canada)
Stand-by assistant video assistant referee:
Alessandro Giallatini (Italy)

=== Netherlands vs Qatar ===
The two teams had never met before.

Cody Gakpo scored his third goal of the tournament to put the Netherlands in front in the 26th minute, cutting in from the left to score with a right-foot finish from just inside the penalty area. Frenkie de Jong made it 2–0 four minutes into the second half when he followed up to poke into the net from close range after goalkeeper Meshaal Barsham had saved a shot from Memphis Depay.

In losing to the Netherlands, Qatar became the first World Cup hosts in history to suffer three defeats and fail to earn a single point.

29 November 2022
18:00

Netherlands	2–0	Qatar
Gakpo 26'; F. de Jong 49'

Al Bayt Stadium, Al Khor
Attendance: 66,784
Referee: Bakary Gassama (Gambia)

Netherlands	Qatar

GK	23	Andries Noppert
CB	2	Jurriën Timber
CB	4	Virgil van Dijk (c)
CB	5	Nathan Aké	(yellow card) 52'
RWB	22	Denzel Dumfries
LWB	17	Daley Blind
CM	15	Marten de Roon		(substituted off) 82'
CM	21	Frenkie de Jong		(substituted off) 86'
AM	14	Davy Klaassen		(substituted off) 66'
CF	8	Cody Gakpo		(substituted off) 82'
CF	10	Memphis Depay		(substituted off) 66'
Substitutions:
MF	11	Steven Berghuis		(substituted on) 66'
FW	18	Vincent Janssen		(substituted on) 66'
FW	19	Wout Weghorst		(substituted on) 82'
MF	20	Teun Koopmeiners		(substituted on) 82'
MF	24	Kenneth Taylor		(substituted on) 86'
Manager:
Louis van Gaal

GK	22	Meshaal Barsham
CB	2	Pedro Miguel
CB	16	Boualem Khoukhi
CB	3	Abdelkarim Hassan
RWB	17	Ismaeel Mohammad	(substituted off) 85'
LWB	14	Homam Ahmed
CM	10	Hassan Al-Haydos (c)	(substituted off) 64'
CM	23	Assim Madibo	(substituted off) 64'
CM	6	Abdulaziz Hatem	(substituted off) 85'
CF	19	Almoez Ali	(substituted off) 64'
CF	11	Akram Afif
Substitutions:
MF	8	Ali Assadalla	(substituted on) 64'
MF	12	Karim Boudiaf	(substituted on) 64'
FW	9	Mohammed Muntari	(substituted on) 64'
DF	13	Musab Kheder	(substituted on) 85'
FW	7	Ahmed Alaaeldin	(substituted on) 85'
Manager:
(Spain) Félix Sánchez

Man of the Match:
Davy Klaassen (Netherlands)

Assistant referees:
Elvis Noupue (Cameroon)
Mahmoud Abouelregal (Egypt)
Fourth official:
Ma Ning (China)
Reserve assistant referee:
Cao Yi (China)
Video assistant referee:
Redouane Jiyed (Morocco)
Assistant video assistant referees:
Adil Zourak (Morocco)
Mokrane Gourari (Algeria)
Julio Bascuñán (Chile)
Stand-by assistant video assistant referee:
Zakhele Siwela (South Africa)

== Discipline ==
Fair play points would have been used as tiebreakers if the overall and head-to-head records of teams were tied. These were calculated based on yellow and red cards received in all group matches as follows:

- first yellow card: −1 point;
- indirect red card (second yellow card): −3 points;
- direct red card: −4 points;
- yellow card and direct red card: −5 points;

Only one of the above deductions were applied to a player in a single match.

Team	Match 1				Match 2				Match 3				Points
Team	Booked	(yellow card) (yellow-red card)	Sent off (straight red)	(yellow card) (red card)	Booked	(yellow card) (yellow-red card)	Sent off (straight red)	(yellow card) (red card)	Booked	(yellow card) (yellow-red card)	Sent off (straight red)	(yellow card) (red card)	Points
Netherlands	1								1				−2
Ecuador	2				1								−3
Senegal	2				3				1				−6
Qatar	4				3								−7

== See also ==
- Ecuador at the FIFA World Cup
- Netherlands at the FIFA World Cup
- Qatar at the FIFA World Cup
- Senegal at the FIFA World Cup
