= 2022 FIFA World Cup officials =

The following is a list of match officials (referees, assistant referees, and video assistant referees) who officiated at the 2022 FIFA World Cup in Qatar.

FIFA appointed ten officials for each match of the tournament. This included the on-site team of the referee, two assistant referees, the fourth official and the reserve assistant referee. At a centralised video operation room in Doha, the team of video match officials operated the video assistant referee (VAR) system. This team consisted of the lead video assistant referee and three assistants, designated as the assistant VAR (AVAR1), the offside VAR (AVAR2) and the support VAR (AVAR3). Finally, a stand-by assistant VAR official was appointed for each match, used in case of a loss of connection between the stadium and the centralised video operation room. In such a scenario, a backup VAR room located in each stadium would be activated, with the fourth official serving as the video assistant referee (and the reserve assistant referee taking his place), and the stand-by assistant VAR serving as the assistant VAR.

For the first time in the history of the FIFA World Cup, the FIFA Referees Committee also appointed three female referees and three female assistant referees.

== Referees and assistant referees ==
On 19 May 2022, FIFA announced the list of 36 referees and 69 assistant referees from all six confederations for the 2022 FIFA World Cup. These were selected from an extended list of over 50 trios.

On 15 December 2022, FIFA announced that Polish referee Szymon Marciniak would adjudicate the final.

Confederation	Referees	Assistants	Matches assigned	Fourth official
AFC	Abdulrahman Al-Jassim (Qatar)	Taleb Al-Marri (Qatar); Saud Al-Maqaleh (Qatar)	United States–Wales (Group B); Croatia–Morocco (Match for third place)	Portugal–Uruguay (Group H)
AFC	Chris Beath (Australia)	Anton Shchetinin (Australia); Ashley Beecham (Australia)	Mexico–Poland (Group C)	
AFC	Alireza Faghani (Iran)	Mohammadreza Mansouri (Iran); Mohammadreza Abolfazli (Iran)	Brazil–Serbia (Group G); Portugal–Uruguay (Group H)	
AFC	Ma Ning (China)	Cao Yi (China); Shi Xiang (China)		Netherlands–Qatar (Group A); United States–Wales (Group B); France–Denmark (Group D); Spain–Costa Rica (Group E); Cameroon–Serbia (Group G); Cameroon–Brazil (Group G)
AFC	Mohammed Abdulla Hassan Mohamed (United Arab Emirates)	Mohamed Al-Hammadi (United Arab Emirates); Hasan Al-Mahri (United Arab Emirates)	Spain–Costa Rica (Group E); Cameroon–Serbia (Group G)	England–France (Quarter-finals); Argentina–Croatia (Semi-finals)
AFC	Yoshimi Yamashita (Japan)			England–United States (Group B); Wales–England (Group B); Belgium–Canada (Group F); Belgium–Morocco (Group F); Canada–Morocco (Group F); Ghana–Uruguay (Group H)
CAF	Bakary Gassama (Gambia)	Elvis Noupue (Cameroon); Mahmoud Abouelregal (Egypt)	Netherlands–Qatar (Group A)	
CAF	Mustapha Ghorbal (Algeria)	Mokrane Gourari (Algeria); Abdelhak Etchiali (Algeria)	Netherlands–Ecuador (Group A); Australia–Denmark (Group D)	Japan–Croatia (Round of 16); Croatia–Brazil (Quarter-finals)
CAF	Victor Gomes (South Africa)	Zakhele Siwela (South Africa); Souru Phatsoane (Lesotho)	France–Australia (Group D); Japan–Spain (Group E)	Netherlands–Argentina (Quarter-finals)
CAF	Maguette Ndiaye (Senegal)	Djibril Camara (Senegal); El Hadj Malick Samba (Senegal)		Wales–Iran (Group B); Argentina–Saudi Arabia (Group C); Australia–Denmark (Group D); Japan–Costa Rica (Group E); Brazil–Serbia (Group G); South Korea–Portugal (Group H)
CAF	Janny Sikazwe (Zambia)	Jerson dos Santos (Angola); Arsénio Marrengula (Mozambique)	Belgium–Canada (Group F)	
CAF	Salima Mukansanga (Rwanda)			France–Australia (Group D); Tunisia–France (Group D); Japan–Spain (Group E)
CONCACAF	Iván Barton (El Salvador)	David Morán (El Salvador); Zachari Zeegelaar (Suriname) (in group stage matches); Kathryn Nesbitt (United States) (in round of 16 match)	Germany–Japan (Group E); Brazil–Switzerland (Group G); England–Senegal (Round of 16)	Morocco–Portugal (Quarter-finals)
CONCACAF	Ismail Elfath (United States)	Kyle Atkins (United States); Corey Parker (United States)	Portugal–Ghana (Group H); Cameroon–Brazil (Group G); Japan–Croatia (Round of 16)	Argentina–France (Final)
CONCACAF	Mario Escobar (Guatemala)	Caleb Wales (Trinidad and Tobago); Juan Carlos Mora (Costa Rica)	Wales–Iran (Group B)	Argentina–Australia (Round of 16)
CONCACAF	Saíd Martínez (Honduras)	Walter López (Honduras); Helpys Raymundo Feliz (Dominican Republic)		Netherlands–Ecuador (Group A); Poland–Argentina (Group C); Denmark–Tunisia (Group D); Tunisia–Australia (Group D); Germany–Japan (Group E); Costa Rica–Germany (Group E); Switzerland–Cameroon (Group G); Brazil–Switzerland (Group G); England–Senegal (Round of 16)
CONCACAF	César Arturo Ramos (Mexico)	Alberto Morín (Mexico); Miguel Hernández (Mexico)	Denmark–Tunisia (Group D); Belgium–Morocco (Group F); Portugal–Switzerland (Round of 16); France–Morocco (Semi-finals)	
CONMEBOL	Raphael Claus (Brazil)	Rodrigo Figueiredo (Brazil); Danilo Manis (Brazil)	England–Iran (Group B); Canada–Morocco (Group F)	Morocco–Spain (Round of 16); Croatia–Morocco (Match for third place)
CONMEBOL	Andrés Matonte (Uruguay)	Nicolás Taran (Uruguay); Martín Soppi (Uruguay)	Croatia–Canada (Group F)	Senegal–Netherlands (Group A); Netherlands–United States (Round of 16)
CONMEBOL	Kevin Ortega (Peru)	Michael Orué (Peru); Jesús Sánchez (Peru)		Qatar–Senegal (Group A); England–Iran (Group B); Iran–United States (Group B); Poland–Saudi Arabia (Group C); Morocco–Croatia (Group F); Croatia–Canada (Group F); Serbia–Switzerland (Group G); South Korea–Ghana (Group H); France–Poland (Round of 16)
CONMEBOL	Fernando Rapallini (Argentina)	Juan Pablo Belatti (Argentina); Diego Bonfá (Argentina)	Morocco–Croatia (Group F); Serbia–Switzerland (Group G); Morocco–Spain (Round of 16)	
CONMEBOL	Facundo Tello (Argentina)	Ezequiel Brailovsky (Argentina); Gabriel Chade (Argentina)	Switzerland–Cameroon (Group G); South Korea–Portugal (Group H); Morocco–Portugal (Quarter-finals)	
CONMEBOL	Jesús Valenzuela (Venezuela)	Jorge Urrego (Venezuela); Tulio Moreno (Venezuela)	England–United States (Group B); France–Poland (Round of 16)	France–Morocco (Semi-finals)
CONMEBOL	Wilton Sampaio (Brazil)	Bruno Boschilia (Brazil); Bruno Pires (Brazil)	Senegal–Netherlands (Group A); Poland–Saudi Arabia (Group C); Netherlands–United States (Round of 16); England–France (Quarter-finals)	
OFC	Matthew Conger (New Zealand)	Mark Rule (New Zealand); Tevita Makasini (Tonga)	Tunisia–France (Group D)	
UEFA	István Kovács (Romania)	Ovidiu Artene (Romania); Vasile Marinescu (Romania)		Qatar–Ecuador (Group A); Ecuador–Senegal (Group A); Argentina–Mexico (Group C); Saudi Arabia–Mexico (Group C); Spain–Germany (Group E); Croatia–Belgium (Group F); Uruguay–South Korea (Group H); Portugal–Switzerland (Round of 16)
UEFA	Danny Makkelie (Netherlands)	Hessel Steegstra (Netherlands); Jan de Vries (Netherlands)	Spain–Germany (Group E); Poland–Argentina (Group C)	
UEFA	Szymon Marciniak (Poland)	Paweł Sokolnicki (Poland); Tomasz Listkiewicz (Poland)	France–Denmark (Group D); Argentina–Australia (Round of 16); Argentina–France (Final)	
UEFA	Antonio Mateu Lahoz (Spain)	Pau Cebrián Devís (Spain); Roberto Díaz Pérez del Palomar (Spain)	Qatar–Senegal (Group A); Iran–United States (Group B); Netherlands–Argentina (Quarter-finals)	
UEFA	Michael Oliver (England)	Stuart Burt (England); Simon Bennett (England) (in group stage matches); Gary Beswick (England) (in quarter-finals)	Japan–Costa Rica (Group E); Saudi Arabia–Mexico (Group C); Croatia–Brazil (Quarter-finals)	
UEFA	Daniele Orsato (Italy)	Ciro Carbone (Italy); Alessandro Giallatini (Italy)	Qatar–Ecuador (Group A); Argentina–Mexico (Group C); Argentina–Croatia (Semi-finals)	
UEFA	Daniel Siebert (Germany)	Rafael Foltyn (Germany); Jan Seidel (Germany)	Tunisia–Australia (Group D); Ghana–Uruguay (Group H)	
UEFA	Anthony Taylor (England)	Gary Beswick (England); Adam Nunn (England)	South Korea–Ghana (Group H); Croatia–Belgium (Group F)	
UEFA	Clément Turpin (France)	Nicolas Danos (France); Cyril Gringore (France)	Uruguay–South Korea (Group H); Ecuador–Senegal (Group A); Brazil–South Korea (Round of 16)	
UEFA	Slavko Vinčić (Slovenia)	Tomaž Klančnik (Slovenia); Andraž Kovačič (Slovenia)	Argentina–Saudi Arabia (Group C); Wales–England (Group B)	Brazil–South Korea (Round of 16)
UEFA	Stéphanie Frappart (France)	Neuza Back (Brazil); Karen Díaz Medina (Mexico)	Costa Rica–Germany (Group E)	Mexico–Poland (Group C); Portugal–Ghana (Group H)

== Video assistant referees ==
On 19 May 2022, FIFA announced 24 video assistant referees (VARs) had been appointed.

Video assistant referees
Confederation	Video assistant referee
AFC	Abdulla Al-Marri (Qatar)
AFC	Muhammad Taqi (Singapore)
AFC	Shaun Evans (Australia)
CAF	Rédouane Jiyed (Morocco)
CAF	Adil Zourak (Morocco)
CONCACAF	Drew Fischer (Canada)
CONCACAF	Fernando Guerrero (Mexico)
CONCACAF	Armando Villarreal (United States)
CONMEBOL	Julio Bascuñán (Chile)
CONMEBOL	Nicolás Gallo (Colombia)
CONMEBOL	Leodán González (Uruguay)
CONMEBOL	Juan Soto (Venezuela)
CONMEBOL	Mauro Vigliano (Argentina)
UEFA	Jérôme Brisard (France)
UEFA	Bastian Dankert (Germany)
UEFA	Ricardo de Burgos Bengoetxea (Spain)
UEFA	Marco Fritz (Germany)
UEFA	Alejandro Hernández Hernández (Spain)
UEFA	Massimiliano Irrati (Italy)
UEFA	Tomasz Kwiatkowski (Poland)
UEFA	Juan Martínez Munuera (Spain)
UEFA	Benoît Millot (France)
UEFA	Paolo Valeri (Italy)
UEFA	Pol van Boekel (Netherlands)
