= 2021 CONCACAF Gold Cup knockout stage =

The knockout stage of the 2021 CONCACAF Gold Cup began on 24 July 2021 with the quarter-finals and ended on 1 August 2021 with the final at the Allegiant Stadium in Paradise.

All match times listed are EDT (UTC−4), as listed by CONCACAF. The local time is also given.

== Format ==
In the knockout stage, if a match was level at the end of 90 minutes of normal playing time, extra time was played (two periods of 15 minutes each), where each team was allowed to make a sixth substitution. If still tied after extra time, the match was decided by a penalty shoot-out to determine the winners.

== Qualified teams ==
The top two placed teams from each of the four groups qualified for the knockout stage.

Group	Winners	Runners-up
A	Mexico	El Salvador
B	United States	Canada
C	Costa Rica	Jamaica
D	Qatar	Honduras

== Bracket ==
Quarter-finals
24 July – Glendale
Qatar	3
El Salvador	2
25 July – Arlington
United States	1
Jamaica	0
24 July – Glendale
Mexico	3
Honduras	0
25 July – Arlington
Costa Rica	0
Canada	2

Semi-finals
29 July – Austin
Qatar	0
United States	1
29 July – Houston (NRG)
Mexico	2
Canada	1

Final
1 August – Paradise
United States (a.e.t.)	1
Mexico	0

== Quarter-finals ==
=== Qatar vs El Salvador ===
24 July 2021
19:30 (16:30 UTC−7)

Qatar	3–2	El Salvador
Ali 2', 55' (pen.); Hatem 8'	Report	Rivas 63', 66'

State Farm Stadium, Glendale
Attendance: 64,211
Referee: Fernando Hernández (Mexico)

Qatar	El Salvador

GK	22	Meshaal Barsham
CB	15	Bassam Al-Rawi
CB	16	Boualem Khoukhi
CB	3	Abdelkarim Hassan
RWB	2	Ró-Ró
LWB	14	Homam Ahmed	(substituted off) 68'
CM	10	Hassan Al-Haydos (c)	(substituted off) 90'
CM	12	Karim Boudiaf
CM	6	Abdulaziz Hatem	(substituted off) 75'
CF	11	Akram Afif	(substituted off) 67'
CF	19	Almoez Ali
Substitutions:
FW	9	Mohammed Muntari	(substituted on) 67'
DF	5	Tarek Salman	(substituted on) 68'
MF	23	Assim Madibo	(substituted on) 75'
MF	20	Abdullah Al-Ahrak	(substituted on) 90'
Head coach:
(Spain) Félix Sánchez

GK	1	Mario González
RB	21	Bryan Tamacas
CB	4	Eriq Zavaleta
CB	5	Ronald Gómez
LB	13	Alexander Larín		(substituted off) 82'
RM	8	Joshua Pérez	(yellow card) 45'	(substituted off) 51'
CM	7	Darwin Cerén (c)	(yellow card) 54'
CM	10	Amando Moreno		(substituted off) 82'
LM	15	Alex Roldan
CF	14	Joaquín Rivas	(yellow card) 71'
CF	17	Jairo Henríquez		(substituted off) 64'
Substitutions:
MF	12	Marvin Monterroza		(substituted on) 51'
FW	9	Walmer Martinez		(substituted on) 64'
FW	11	Juan Carlos Portillo		(substituted on) 82'
FW	23	Marvin Márquez		(substituted on) 82'
Head coach:
(United States) Hugo Pérez

Man of the Match:
Joaquín Rivas (El Salvador)

Assistant referees:
Michel Morales (Mexico)
Henri Pupiro (Nicaragua)
Fourth official:
Fernando Guerrero (Mexico)
Video assistant referee:
Arturo Cruz (Mexico)
Assistant video assistant referee:
Joel Rangel (Mexico)

=== Mexico vs Honduras ===
24 July 2021
22:30 (19:30 UTC−7)

Mexico	3–0	Honduras
Funes Mori 26'; Dos Santos 31'; Pineda 38'	Report

State Farm Stadium, Glendale
Attendance: 64,211
Referee: Mario Escobar (Guatemala)

Mexico	Honduras

GK	1	Alfredo Talavera
RB	21	Luis Rodríguez
CB	2	Néstor Araujo		(substituted off) 73'
CB	15	Héctor Moreno (c)
LB	23	Jesús Gallardo	(yellow card) 84'
CM	6	Jonathan dos Santos		(substituted off) 73'
CM	4	Edson Álvarez		(substituted off) 81'
CM	16	Héctor Herrera
RF	17	Jesús Manuel Corona		(substituted off) 85'
CF	11	Rogelio Funes Mori		(substituted off) 85'
LF	10	Orbelín Pineda
Substitutions:
DF	3	Carlos Salcedo		(substituted on) 73'
MF	7	Érick Sánchez		(substituted on) 73'
MF	13	Alan Cervantes		(substituted on) 81'
FW	9	Alan Pulido		(substituted on) 85'
FW	24	Rodolfo Pizarro		(substituted on) 85'
Head coach:
(Argentina) Gerardo Martino

GK	22	Luis López
RB	5	Raúl Santos
CB	21	Kevin Álvarez
CB	3	Maynor Figueroa (c)
LB	16	Johnny Leverón
RM	25	Kevin López		(substituted off) 46'
CM	6	Bryan Acosta	(yellow card) 35'	(substituted off) 46'
CM	20	Deybi Flores	(yellow card) 59'
LM	23	Diego Rodríguez		(substituted off) 78'
SS	10	Alexander López		(substituted off) 66'
CF	11	Jerry Bengtson
Substitutions:
MF	13	Jhow Benavídez		(substituted on) 46'
MF	14	Boniek García	(yellow card) 59'	(substituted on) 46'
FW	24	Roger Rojas	(yellow card) 90'	(substituted on) 66'
DF	17	Franklin Flores		(substituted on) 78'
Head coach:
Arnold Cruz

Man of the Match:
Rogelio Funes Mori (Mexico)

Assistant referees:
Caleb Wales (Trinidad and Tobago)
Logan Brown (United States)
Fourth official:
Oshane Nation (Jamaica)
Video assistant referee:
Allen Chapman (United States)
Assistant video assistant referee:
Tatiana Guzmán (Nicaragua)

=== Costa Rica vs Canada ===
25 July 2021
19:00 (18:00 UTC−5)

Costa Rica	0–2	Canada
	Report	Hoilett 18'; Eustáquio 69'

AT&T Stadium, Arlington
Attendance: 41,318
Referee: Jair Marrufo (United States)

Costa Rica	Canada

GK	1	Esteban Alvarado
RB	4	Keysher Fuller
CB	15	Francisco Calvo
CB	6	Óscar Duarte
LB	22	Rónald Matarrita
DM	20	David Guzmán	(substituted off) 66'
CM	5	Celso Borges (c)	(substituted off) 90'
CM	11	Ariel Lassiter	(substituted off) 46'
RW	16	Alonso Martínez	(substituted off) 46'
LW	7	Johan Venegas	(substituted off) 46'
CF	12	Joel Campbell
Substitutions:
MF	8	Luis Díaz	(substituted on) 46'
MF	10	Bryan Ruiz	(substituted on) 46'
FW	21	José Guillermo Ortiz	(substituted on) 46'
MF	13	Allan Cruz	(substituted on) 66'
MF	14	Jimmy Marín	(substituted on) 90'
Head coach:
(Colombia) Luis Fernando Suárez

GK	16	Maxime Crépeau
CB	2	Alistair Johnston
CB	5	Steven Vitória (c)	(yellow card) 31'
CB	4	Kamal Miller
RM	22	Richie Laryea
CM	7	Stephen Eustáquio
CM	14	Mark-Anthony Kaye		(substituted off) 70'
LM	12	Tajon Buchanan		(substituted off) 88'
RF	10	Junior Hoilett		(substituted off) 70'
CF	21	Jonathan Osorio		(substituted off) 85'
LF	9	Lucas Cavallini	(yellow card) 38'	(substituted off) 84'
Substitutions:
MF	6	Samuel Piette		(substituted on) 70'
FW	24	Tesho Akindele	(yellow card) 83'	(substituted on) 70'
DF	15	Doneil Henry		(substituted on) 84'
MF	8	Liam Fraser		(substituted on) 85'
FW	11	Theo Corbeanu		(substituted on) 88'
Head coach:
(England) John Herdman

Man of the Match:
Stephen Eustáquio (Canada)

Assistant referees:
Frank Anderson (United States)
Kathryn Nesbitt (United States)
Fourth official:
Armando Villarreal (United States)
Video assistant referee:
Bakary Gassama (Gambia)
Assistant video assistant referee:
Tim Ford (United States)

=== United States vs Jamaica ===
25 July 2021
21:30 (20:30 UTC−5)

United States	1–0	Jamaica
Hoppe 83'	Report

AT&T Stadium, Arlington
Attendance: 41,318
Referee: César Ramos (Mexico)

United States	Jamaica

GK	1	Matt Turner
RB	20	Shaq Moore	(substituted off) 85'
CB	16	James Sands
CB	12	Miles Robinson
LB	3	Sam Vines
CM	6	Gianluca Busio
CM	23	Kellyn Acosta
CM	17	Sebastian Lletget
RF	7	Paul Arriola (c)	(substituted off) 63'
CF	11	Daryl Dike	(substituted off) 63'
LF	13	Matthew Hoppe	(substituted off) 84'
Substitutions:
FW	9	Gyasi Zardes	(substituted on) 63'
MF	10	Cristian Roldan	(substituted on) 63'
FW	8	Nicholas Gioacchini	(substituted on) 84'
DF	2	Reggie Cannon	(substituted on) 85'
Head coach:
Gregg Berhalter

GK	1	Andre Blake (c)
RB	5	Alvas Powell		(substituted off) 28'
CB	17	Damion Lowe	(yellow card) 89'
CB	6	Liam Moore
LB	20	Kemar Lawrence
RM	15	Blair Turgott	(yellow card) 50'	(substituted off) 74'
CM	22	Devon Williams
CM	16	Daniel Johnson
LM	12	Junior Flemmings		(substituted off) 85'
CF	9	Cory Burke	(yellow card) 30'	(substituted off) 74'
CF	10	Bobby De Cordova-Reid
Substitutions:
DF	8	Oniel Fisher		(substituted on) 28'
FW	14	Andre Gray		(substituted on) 74'
FW	11	Shamar Nicholson		(substituted on) 74'
MF	21	Tyreek Magee		(substituted on) 85'
Head coach:
Theodore Whitmore

Man of the Match:
Matthew Hoppe (United States)

Assistant referees:
Alberto Morín (Mexico)
Miguel Hernández (Mexico)
Fourth official:
Selvin Brown (Honduras)
Video assistant referee:
Ángel Monroy (Mexico)
Assistant video assistant referee:
León Barajas (Mexico)

== Semi-finals ==
=== Qatar vs United States ===
29 July 2021
19:30 (18:30 UTC−5)

Qatar	0–1	United States
	Report	Zardes 86'

Q2 Stadium, Austin
Attendance: 20,500
Referee: Juan Gabriel Calderón (Costa Rica)

Qatar	United States

GK	22	Meshaal Barsham
CB	15	Bassam Al-Rawi
CB	16	Boualem Khoukhi
CB	3	Abdelkarim Hassan
RWB	2	Ró-Ró
LWB	14	Homam Ahmed
CM	10	Hassan Al-Haydos (c)		(substituted off) 72'
CM	12	Karim Boudiaf	(yellow card) 40'
CM	6	Abdulaziz Hatem		(substituted off) 88'
CF	11	Akram Afif		(substituted off) 77'
CF	19	Almoez Ali
Substitutions:
MF	20	Abdullah Al-Ahrak		(substituted on) 72'
FW	9	Mohammed Muntari		(substituted on) 77'
FW	7	Ahmed Alaaeldin		(substituted on) 88'
Head coach:
(Spain) Félix Sánchez

GK	1	Matt Turner
RB	20	Shaq Moore	(yellow card) 62'	(substituted off) 63'
CB	16	James Sands
CB	12	Miles Robinson
LB	3	Sam Vines
CM	6	Gianluca Busio		(substituted off) 63'
CM	23	Kellyn Acosta
CM	17	Sebastian Lletget
RF	7	Paul Arriola (c)		(substituted off) 81'
CF	11	Daryl Dike		(substituted off) 63'
LF	13	Matthew Hoppe		(substituted off) 81'
Substitutions:
MF	10	Cristian Roldan		(substituted on) 63'
DF	2	Reggie Cannon		(substituted on) 63'
FW	9	Gyasi Zardes		(substituted on) 63'
FW	8	Nicholas Gioacchini		(substituted on) 81'
MF	19	Eryk Williamson		(substituted on) 81'
Head coach:
Gregg Berhalter

Man of the Match:
Matt Turner (United States)

Assistant referees:
Juan Carlos Mora (Costa Rica)
Djibril Camará (Senegal)
Fourth official:
Selvin Brown (Honduras)
Video assistant referee:
Bakary Gassama (Gambia)
Assistant video assistant referee:
Arturo Cruz (Mexico)

=== Mexico vs Canada ===
29 July 2021
22:15 (21:15 UTC−5)

Mexico	2–1	Canada
Pineda 45+2' (pen.); Herrera 90+9'	Report	Buchanan 57'

NRG Stadium, Houston
Attendance: 70,304
Referee: Daneon Parchment (Jamaica)

Mexico	Canada

GK	1	Alfredo Talavera
RB	21	Luis Rodríguez
CB	3	Carlos Salcedo
CB	15	Héctor Moreno (c)
LB	23	Jesús Gallardo	(yellow card) 79'
CM	6	Jonathan dos Santos		(substituted off) 61'
CM	4	Edson Álvarez
CM	16	Héctor Herrera
RF	17	Jesús Manuel Corona		(substituted off) 90+10'
CF	11	Rogelio Funes Mori	(yellow card) 90+7'
LF	10	Orbelín Pineda		(substituted off) 78'
Substitutions:
MF	7	Érick Sánchez	(yellow card) 67'	(substituted on) 61'
FW	24	Rodolfo Pizarro		(substituted on) 78'
DF	2	Néstor Araujo		(substituted on) 90+10'
Head coach:
(Argentina) Gerardo Martino

GK	16	Maxime Crépeau	(yellow card) 90+12'
CB	2	Alistair Johnston
CB	15	Doneil Henry	(yellow card) 45'
CB	4	Kamal Miller
RM	22	Richie Laryea
CM	7	Stephen Eustáquio	(yellow card) 90+12'
CM	14	Mark-Anthony Kaye		(substituted off) 78'
LM	12	Tajon Buchanan	(yellow card) 49'
RF	21	Jonathan Osorio
CF	24	Tesho Akindele		(substituted off) 69'
LF	10	Junior Hoilett (c)	(yellow card) 49'
Substitutions:
FW	11	Theo Corbeanu		(substituted on) 69'
MF	8	Liam Fraser		(substituted on) 78'
Head coach:
(England) John Herdman

Man of the Match:
Héctor Herrera (Mexico)

Assistant referees:
Caleb Wales (Trinidad and Tobago)
Jassett Kerr (Jamaica)
Fourth official:
Oshane Nation (Jamaica)
Video assistant referee:
Allen Chapman (United States)
Assistant video assistant referee:
Armando Villarreal (United States)

== Final ==
August 1, 2021
21:00 (18:00 UTC−7)

United States	1–0 (a.e.t.)	Mexico
Robinson 117'	Report

Allegiant Stadium, Paradise
Attendance: 61,114
Referee: Saíd Martínez (Honduras)

United States	Mexico

GK	1	Matt Turner
RB	2	Reggie Cannon		(substituted off) 65'
CB	16	James Sands
CB	12	Miles Robinson
LB	21	George Bello		(substituted off) 65'
CM	19	Eryk Williamson		(substituted off) 87'
CM	23	Kellyn Acosta	(yellow card) 113'
CM	17	Sebastian Lletget		(substituted off) 66'
RF	7	Paul Arriola (c)		(substituted off) 87'
CF	9	Gyasi Zardes
LF	13	Matthew Hoppe		(substituted off) 120+1'
Substitutions:
DF	20	Shaq Moore		(substituted on) 65'
DF	3	Sam Vines		(substituted on) 65'
MF	10	Cristian Roldan		(substituted on) 66'
MF	6	Gianluca Busio		(substituted on) 87'
FW	8	Nicholas Gioacchini		(substituted on) 87'
DF	24	Henry Kessler		(substituted on) 120+1'
Head coach:
Gregg Berhalter

GK	1	Alfredo Talavera
RB	21	Luis Rodríguez
CB	2	Néstor Araujo
CB	15	Héctor Moreno (c)		(substituted off) 44'
LB	23	Jesús Gallardo	(yellow card) 114'
CM	6	Jonathan dos Santos		(substituted off) 76'
CM	4	Edson Álvarez	(yellow card) 117'
CM	16	Héctor Herrera	(yellow card) 72'
RF	17	Jesús Manuel Corona		(substituted off) 91'
CF	11	Rogelio Funes Mori		(substituted off) 106'
LF	10	Orbelín Pineda		(substituted off) 76'
Substitutions:
DF	3	Carlos Salcedo		(substituted on) 44' (substituted off) 106'
MF	14	Érick Gutiérrez		(substituted on) 76'
FW	24	Rodolfo Pizarro		(substituted on) 76'
DF	5	Osvaldo Rodríguez		(substituted on) 91'
FW	9	Alan Pulido		(substituted on) 106'
DF	19	Gilberto Sepúlveda		(substituted on) 106'
Head coach:
(Argentina) Gerardo Martino

Man of the Match:
Matt Turner (United States)

Assistant referees:
Walter López (Honduras)
Henri Pupiro (Nicaragua)
Fourth official:
Mario Escobar (Guatemala)
Reserve assistant referee:
Christian Ramírez (Honduras)
Video assistant referee:
Drew Fischer (Canada)
Assistant video assistant referee:
Tatiana Guzmán (Nicaragua)
