= Caleb Wales =

Trinidadian football referee (born 1988)

- Born: 1988 (age 37–38); Trinidad and Tobago

Domestic
Years	League	Role
2006–present	Football leagues in T&T	Assistant referee

International
Years	League	Role
2013–present	FIFA listed	Assistant referee

Caleb Wales (born 1988) is a Trinidadian football assistant referee who has been on the FIFA International Referees List since 2013.

== Career ==
Wales was born in Trinidad and Tobago in 1988. He has credited his passion for refereeing to Ramesh Ramdhan, who represented Trinidad and Tobago in the 1998 FIFA World Cup in France. Wales stated that he dreamed of becoming a referee while watching Ramdhan handle games at that tournament. He has also credited his own father, who served for several years as a national referee in Trinidadian leagues.

In the mid-2000s, Wales embarked on a professional career in refereeing, training for years in the Trinidad and Tobago Football Association to improve in local competitions until earning his FIFA badge in 2013. Since the designation as an international assistant referee, Wales has taken part in numerous tournaments in CONCACAF, including the Nations League and the Gold Cup.

Wales was appointed as an assistant referee to his first CONCACAF tournament in the 2019 CONCACAF Gold Cup. He later served at the 2021 CONCACAF Nations League final between the United States and Mexico under referee John Pitti of Panama. That same year, Wales was part of the officials at the semi-final between Mexico and Canada for the CONCACAF Gold Cup, under Daneon Parchmant as the pitch referee from Jamaica.

In 2022, Wales was appointed as an assistant referee to the 2022 FIFA World Cup in Qatar with Guatemalan referee Mario Escobar leading the trio. Wales served in a single group stage match between Wales and Iran for Group B. As a result of his surname, British press and Welsh fans took notice of Wales refereeing Wales, with The Sun titling a note as "Wales reffing Wales."

After the World Cup in Qatar, Wales continued to take part in CONCACAF competitions, including two Gold Cup editions (2023 and 2025).

Wales was selected in April 2026 to serve as an assistant referee in his second World Cup edition at the 2026 FIFA World Cup in North America, assisting Jamaican referee Oshane Nation.

== Selected performances ==
Performances
Date	Match	Result	Round	Tournament
6 June 2021	United States vs Mexico	3–2	Final	2021 CONCACAF Nations League Finals
29 July 2021	Mexico vs Canada	2–1	Semi-final	2021 CONCACAF Gold Cup
25 November 2022	Wales vs Iran	0–2	Group stage	2022 FIFA World Cup
