= Abdelkarim Hassan =

Qatari footballer (born 1993)

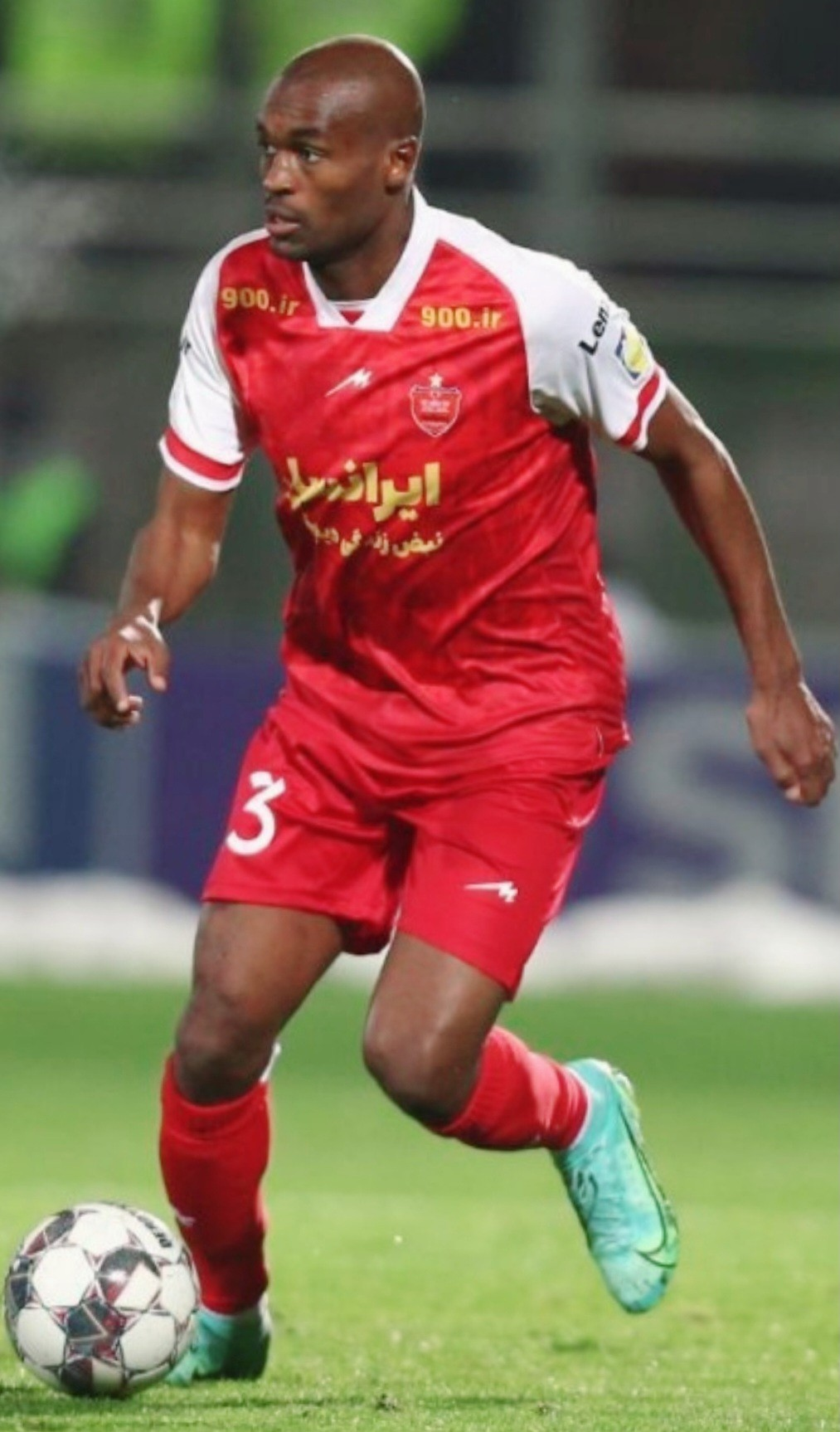
- Hassan playing for Persepolis in 2024

Personal information
- Full name: Abdelkarim Hassan Al Haj Fadlalla
- Date of birth: 28 August 1993 (age 33)
- Place of birth: Doha, Qatar
- Height: 1.85 m (6 ft 1 in)
- Positions: Left-back; center-back

Team information
- Current team: Al-Shamal
- Number: 3

Youth career
- 2007–2010: Al Sadd

Senior career*
Years	Team	Apps	(Gls)
2010–2022	Al Sadd	190	(29)
2017–2018	→ Eupen (loan)	10	(1)
2023–2024	Al-Jahra	21	(0)
2024	Persepolis	13	(0)
2024–2026	Al-Wakrah	14	(0)
2026–	Al-Shamal	1	(0)

International career^{‡}
2010–2014	Qatar U20	5	(1)
2011–2015	Qatar U23	9	(4)
2010–	Qatar	136	(15)
Medal record
Representing Qatar
Men's Football
AFC Asian Cup
Winner	Qatar 2019
FIFA Arab Cup
Third place	Qatar 2021
- * Club domestic league appearances and goals as of 8 March 2025 (UTC) ‡ National team caps and goals as of 20 March 2025 (UTC)

Abdelkarim Hassan Al Haj Fadlalla (Arabic: عَبْد الْكَرِيم حَسَن الْحَاجّ فَضْل الله; born 28 August 1993) is a Qatari professional footballer who plays as a left-back or center-back for Qatar Stars League club Al-Shamal and the Qatar national team.

Abdelkarim won the Asian Footballer of the Year award in 2018.

== Club career ==
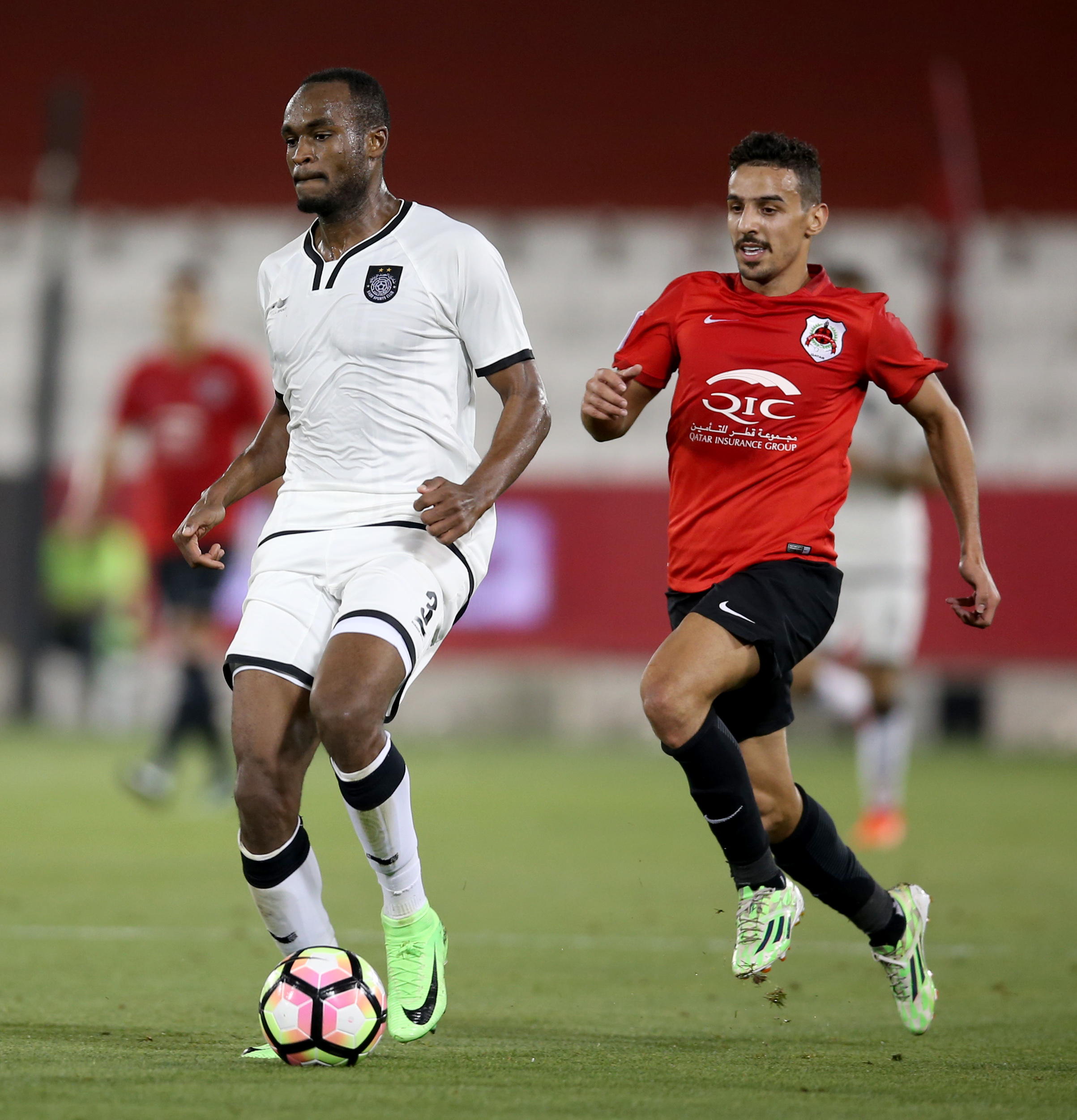
Abdelkarim with Abdurahman Al-Harazi in a QSL match, 2017

Abdelkarim Hassan graduated from Aspire Academy in 2011.

He was the youngest player to appear in the 2011 AFC Champions League at 17 years old, coming off the bench against Esteghlal. His team subsequently emerged champions of the Champions League that year. He was awarded Young Player of the Year in the 2012–13 Qatar Stars League. It was announced in June 2017 that Al Sadd had loaned him to Belgian First Division A side Eupen.

Abdelkarim played in the 2019 FIFA Club World Cup, in which he scored in a 3–1 win over Hienghène Sport. He later scored in the second round 3–2 loss against C.F. Monterrey. Al-Sadd eventually finished in the 5th place.

On 21 December 2022, the management of Al Sadd announced that Abdelkarim Hassan has been excluded from the football first team permanently. This comes due to the player’s outlook not matching the goals and aspirations of the team for the upcoming period. On 25 January 2023, Abdelkarim Hassan joined for Kuwaiti Premier League club Al-Jahra.

=== Persepolis ===
On 22 January 2024, Hassan joined Persian Gulf Pro League side Persepolis on a 18-month deal, making him first Qatari footballer to play professionally in Iran.

== International career ==
=== Youth teams ===
Abdelkarim scored a goal against UAE U20 in the 10th International Friendship Youth Tournament.

In a friendly match against the Malaysia U-23 side on 17 June 2012, Abdelkarim sparked a mass melee between the two sides after a two-footed lunge on Mohd Azrif in the 43rd minute. He was duly shown a red card for his challenge. Afterwards, a Malaysian player, Nazmi Faiz, ran half the length of the pitch to confront him, and punched him. Being 5 inches shorter than Abdelkarim, Nazmi's punch turned into nothing more than a push on his chest. Faiz was promptly shown a red card. Qatar went on to lose the match 2–0.

He scored a goal in Qatar's opening game against Maldives in the qualifying stage for the 2014 AFC U-22 Asian Cup.

=== Senior team ===
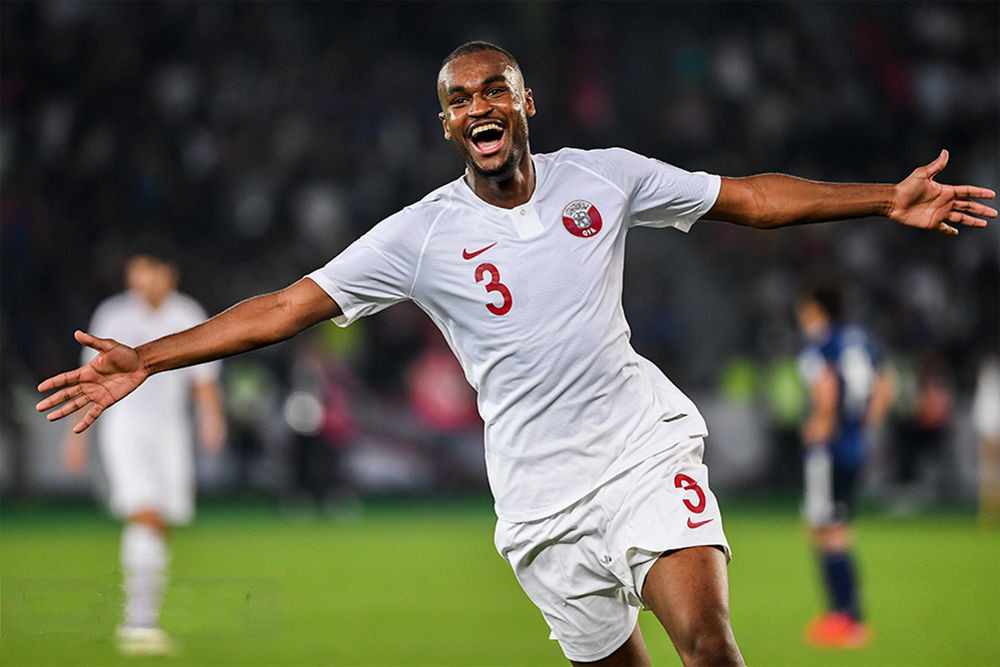
Abdelkarim with Qatar in the 2019 Asian Cup Final

Abdelkarim made his debut for the senior national team on 18 November 2010 against Haiti.

He was the youngest player to appear in the preliminary squad list for the 2011 Asian Cup at the age of 17 years and 123 days old. He scored Qatar's only goal against Malaysia in the 2015 AFC Asian Cup qualifiers to ensure Qatar a berth in the Asian Cup. He also scored a goal in Qatar's 4–1 victory against Yemen in the qualifiers.

Though his team lost all their group stage games in the 2015 AFC Asian Cup, he was extolled as one of the stars of the tournament. A FIFA.com featured article theorized that he would form the basis of young players who go on to represent Qatar at the 2022 FIFA World Cup.

He was named part of Qatar's squad for the 23rd Arabian Gulf Cup held in Kuwait in from December 2017 to January 2018.

He was part of Qatar's squad at 2019 AFC Asian Cup which helped them to win their first continental title. On 30 March 2021, he played his 100th match for Qatar in a 1–1 friendly match against the Republic of Ireland.

=== Controversy ===
Following the three-loss streak of the Qatar national football team in the group stage of the 2022 FIFA World Cup, screenshots of a conversation with Hassan on Snapchat surfaced and started circulating over social media. In the conversation Hassan displayed a careless and apathetic attitude towards the poor performance of the team with a now-famous remark, saying: "استريح عبالك حرب" (lit. 'Relax! It's not war'). Following the remark, the Qatar Football Association announced on its official twitter account the exclusion of Hassan from the national team as did Hassan’s club Al Sadd SC from the player roster.

== Career statistics ==
=== Club ===
As of 8 March 2025

Club	Season	League	League		Cup^{1}		League Cup^{2}		Continental^{3}		Total	
Club	Season	League	Apps	Goals	Apps	Goals	Apps	Goals	Apps	Goals	Apps	Goals
Al Sadd	2010–11	QSL	10	0	0	0	0	0	10	0	20	0
Al Sadd	2011–12	QSL	9	0	0	0	6	0	0	0	15	0
Al Sadd	2012–13	QSL	18	3	3	0	0	0	0	0	7	0
Al Sadd	2013–14	QSL	23	2	3	0	2	0	8	0	35	0
Al Sadd	2014–15	QSL	25	5	3	0	2	0	10	1	40	6
Al Sadd	2015–16	QSL	21	4	1	1	0	0	1	0	23	5
Al Sadd	2016–17	QSL	23	3	0	0	0	0	1	0	24	3
K.A.S. Eupen	2017–18 (loan)	Belgian First Division A	10	1	1	0	0	0	0	0	11	1
Al Sadd	2017–18	QSL	8	1	2	0	1	0	11	1	22	2
Al Sadd	2018–19	QSL	14	4	3	0	0	0	10	1	27	5
Al Sadd	2019–20	QSL	16	2	1	1	6	2	8	0	31	5
Al Sadd	2020–21	QSL	16	2	5	0	2	0	6	0	29	2
Al Sadd	2021–22	QSL	17	3	3	1	0	0	4	0	24	4
Al Sadd	2022–23	QSL	0	0	0	0	0	0	0	0	0	0
Al Sadd	Al Sadd SC Total		200	29	24	3	19	2	69	5	312	39
Al Sadd B	2016–17	Reserve League (Qatar)	1	0	0	0	—		—		1	0
Al Sadd B	2021–22	Reserve League (Qatar)	1	0	0	0	—		—		1	0
Al-Jahra	2022–23	KPL	12	0	1	1	—		—		13	1
Al-Jahra	2023–24	KPL	9	0	1	0	—		—		10	0
Al-Jahra Total			21	0	2	1	—		—		23	1
Persepolis	2023–24	Pro League	13	0	2	0	—		—		15	0
Persepolis	Total		13	0	2	0	0	0	0	0	15	0
Al-Wakrah	2024–25	QSL	13	0	2	0	—		4	0	19	0
Career Total			259	30	31	4	19	2	73	5	382	41

^{1}Includes Emir of Qatar Cup.

^{2}Includes Sheikh Jassem Cup.

^{3}Includes AFC Champions League.

=== International goals ===
Qatar score listed first, score column indicates score after each Hassan goal.

International goals by date, venue, cap, opponent, score, result and competition
No.	Date	Venue	Cap	Opponent	Score	Result	Competition
1	31 January 2013	Jassim Bin Hamad Stadium, Doha, Qatar	2	Lebanon	1–0	1–0	Friendly
2	7 March 2013	Thani bin Jassim Stadium, Doha, Qatar	4	Egypt	1–1	3–1	Friendly
3	15 November 2013	Khalifa International Stadium, Doha, Qatar	18	Yemen	2–1	4–1	2015 AFC Asian Cup qualification
4	6 November 2014	Abdullah bin Khalifa Stadium, Doha, Qatar	29	North Korea	3–0	3–1	Friendly
5	27 December 2014	Abdullah bin Khalifa Stadium, Doha, Qatar	35	Estonia	2–0	3–0	Friendly
6	30 March 2015	Jassim Bin Hamad Stadium, Doha, Qatar	40	Slovenia	1–0	1–0	Friendly
7	8 September 2015	Mong Kok Stadium, Mong Kok, Hong Kong	46	Hong Kong	2–0	3–2	2018 FIFA World Cup qualification
8	29 May 2016	Stadion Hartberg, Hartberg, Austria	52	Albania	1–0	1–3	Friendly
9	6 June 2017	Jassim Bin Hamad Stadium, Doha, Qatar	60	North Korea	1–0	2–2	Friendly
10	13 January 2019	Khalifa bin Zayed Stadium, Al Ain, United Arab Emirates	78	North Korea	6–0	6–0	2019 AFC Asian Cup
11	5 September 2019	Jassim Bin Hamad Stadium, Doha, Qatar	87	Afghanistan	4–0	6–0	2022 FIFA World Cup qualification
12	29 November 2019	Khalifa International Stadium, Doha, Qatar	94	Yemen	1–0	6–0	24th Arabian Gulf Cup
13	29 November 2019	Khalifa International Stadium, Doha, Qatar	94	Yemen	2–0	6–0	24th Arabian Gulf Cup
14	29 November 2019	Khalifa International Stadium, Doha, Qatar	94	Yemen	4–0	6–0	24th Arabian Gulf Cup
15	4 September 2021	Nagyerdei Stadion, Debrecen, Hungary	108	Portugal	1–2	1–3	Friendly

== Honours ==
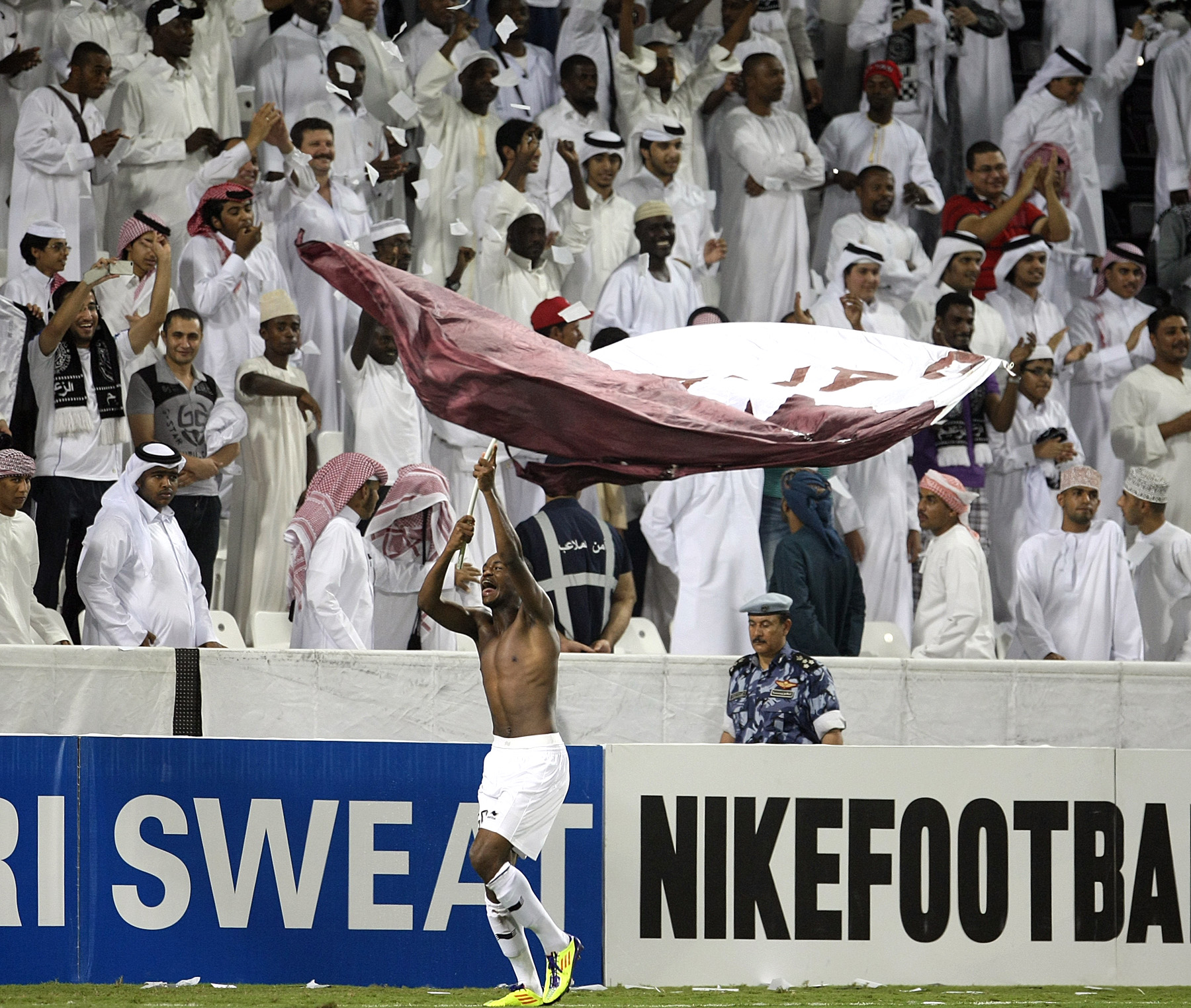
Abdelkarim celebrating Al-Sadd's AFC Champions League win in 2011

Al-Sadd

- Qatar Stars League: 2012–13, 2018–19, 2020–21, 2021-22
- Emir of Qatar Cup: 2014, 2015, 2017, 2020, 2021
- Qatar Cup: 2017, 2020, 2021
- Sheikh Jassim Cup: 2014, 2019
- Qatari Stars Cup: 2019-20
- AFC Champions League: 2011
- FIFA Club World Cup third place: 2011

Persepolis

- Persian Gulf Pro League: 2023–24

Qatar U23

- GCC U-23 Championship: 2011

Qatar

- AFC Asian Cup: 2019
- Arabian Gulf Cup: 2014

Individual

- Asian Footballer of the Year: 2018
- AFC Asian Cup Team of the Tournament: 2019
- Qatar Stars League Team of the Year: 2017–18, 2018–19, 2019–20

== See also ==
- List of men's footballers with 100 or more international caps
