= Homam Ahmed =

Qatari footballer (born 1999)

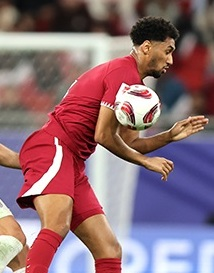
- Ahmed with Qatar in 2023

Personal information
- Full name: Homam El-Amin Mohamed Ahmed
- Date of birth: 25 August 1999 (age 27)
- Place of birth: Doha, Qatar
- Height: 1.88 m (6 ft 2 in)
- Position: Left-back

Team information
- Current team: Valladolid (on loan from Al-Duhail)

Youth career
- –2017: Aspire Academy

Senior career*
Years	Team	Apps	(Gls)
2017–2018	Eupen	0	(0)
2019–2024	Al-Gharafa	79	(7)
2024–	Al-Duhail	30	(5)
2026	→ Cultural Leonesa (loan)	14	(0)
2026–	→ Valladolid (loan)	0	(0)

International career^{‡}
2018–2019	Qatar U20	5	(1)
2020–2021	Qatar U23	7	(0)
2019–	Qatar	54	(3)
Medal record
Representing Qatar
Men's football
FIFA Arab Cup
Third place	2021
AFC Asian Cup
First place	2023
- * Club domestic league appearances and goals as of 31 May 2026 ‡ National team caps and goals as of 27 March 2024 (UTC)

Homam El-Amin Mohamed Ahmed (Arabic: همام الأمين محمد أحمد; born 25 August 1999) is a Qatari professional footballer who plays as a left back for Segunda División club Valladolid, on loan from Al-Duhail, and the Qatar national team.

== Club career ==
In January 2026, Al-Duhail loaned Ahmed to Cultural Leonesa. On 20 August, he moved to Valladolid also in the Segunda División, on a one-year loan deal.

== International career ==
Ahmed represented the Qatar national team at the 2021 CONCACAF Gold Cup, where he scored in Qatar's match against Honduras.

He represented Qatar at the 2022 FIFA World Cup, starting all three matches.

He represented Qatar at the 2023 CONCACAF Gold Cup and the 2023 AFC Asian Cup.

He again represented Qatar at the 2026 FIFA World Cup.

== Career statistics ==
=== International goals ===
Scores and results list Qatar's goal tally first.

No.	Date	Venue	Opponent	Score	Result	Competition
1.	21 July 2021	PNC Stadium, Houston, United States	Honduras	1–0	2–0	2021 CONCACAF Gold Cup
2.	7 September 2021	Stade de Luxembourg, Gasperich, Luxembourg	Luxembourg	1–1	1–1	Friendly
3.	15 June 2023	Sonnenseestadion, Ritzing, Austria	Jamaica	1–0	2–1	Friendly

== Honours ==
Al-Gharafa

- Qatari Stars Cup: 2017–18, 2018–19

Qatar

- AFC Asian Cup: 2023
