= Abdulaziz Hatem =

Qatari footballer (born 1990)

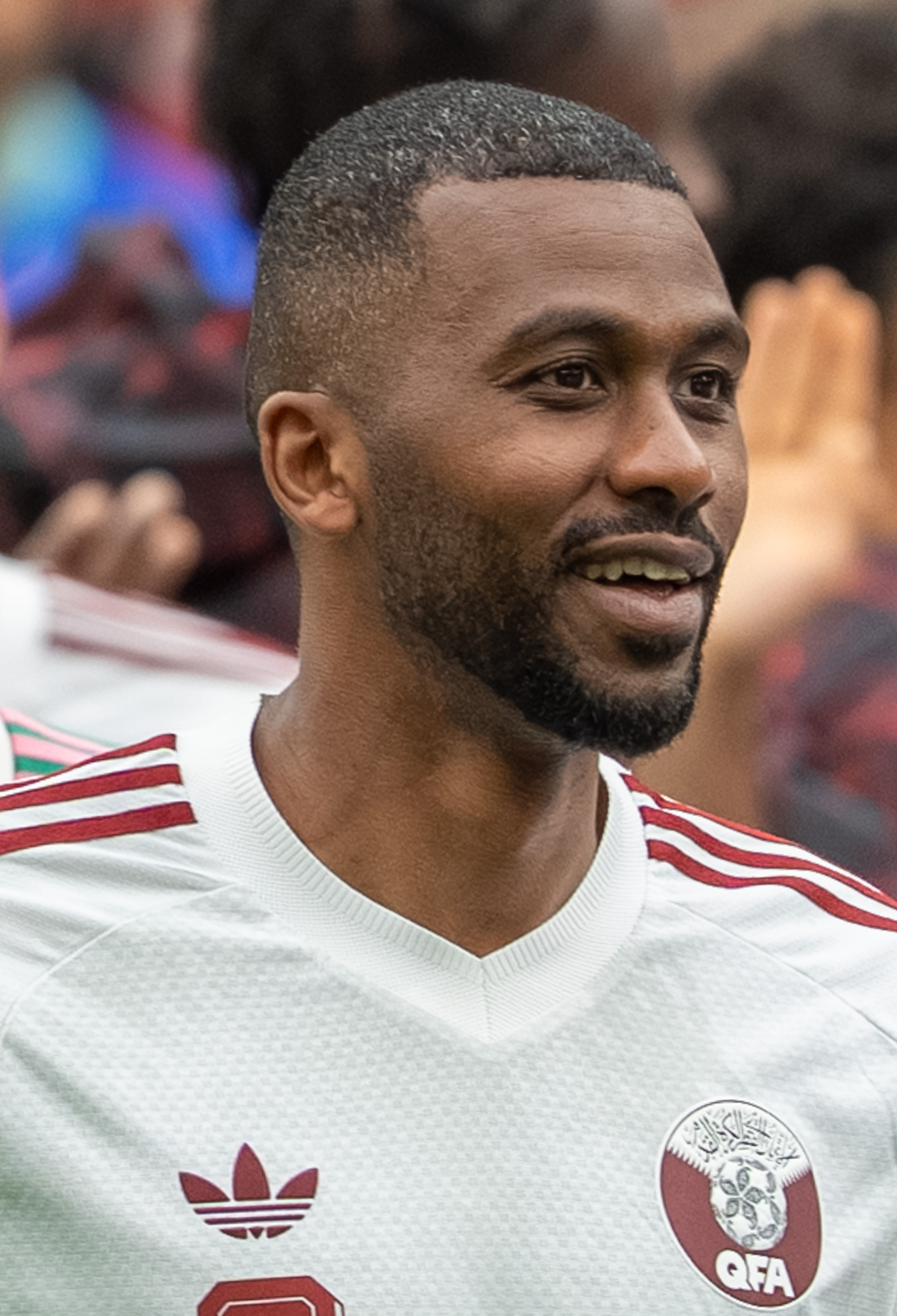
- Hatem with Qatar in 2026

Personal information
- Full name: Abdulaziz Hatem Mohammed Abdullah
- Date of birth: 1 January 1990 (age 36)
- Place of birth: Doha, Qatar
- Height: 1.82 m (6 ft 0 in)
- Position: Midfielder

Team information
- Current team: Al Rayyan
- Number: 6

Senior career*
Years	Team	Apps	(Gls)
2007–2015	Al-Arabi	81	(14)
2015–2019	Al-Gharafa	80	(6)
2019–	Al-Rayyan	100	(15)

International career^{‡}
2010	Qatar U23	4	(1)
2009–	Qatar	122	(11)
Medal record
Representing Qatar
AFC Asian Cup
Winner	UAE 2019	Team
Winner	2023 Qatar	Team
FIFA Arab Cup
Third place	Qatar 2021	Team
- * Club domestic league appearances and goals as of 27 March 2024 ‡ National team caps and goals as of 5 September 2024

Abdulaziz Hatem Mohammed Abdullah (Arabic: عَبْد الْعَزِيز حَاتِم مُحَمَّد عَبْد الله; born 1 January 1990) is a Qatari professional footballer who plays as a midfielder for Al Rayyan and captains the Qatar national team.

== Club career ==
Hatem began his professional career with Al-Arabi SC in 2007 and moved to Al-Gharafa SC in 2015. In July 2019 he joined Al-Rayyan SC.

== International career ==
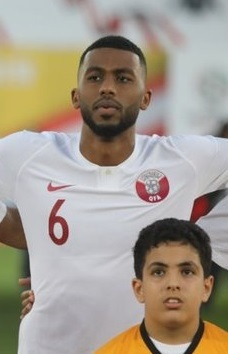
Hatem with Qatar at the 2019 AFC Asian Cup.

He made his debut for the Qatar national football team during the 9th International Friendship Tournament held in December 2009.

Hatem participated for the Qatar olympic team in the 2012 Summer Olympic qualifiers. He received 2 yellow cards during the group stage, rendering him ineligible to compete for one game. Qatar, however, chose to play him against Oman, resulting in FIFA overturning the 1–1 draw to a 3–0 loss for Qatar. This meant that Qatar, who were undefeated in the group stage, would end up third in the group while Oman and South Korea went through to the next stage.

Hatem was selected for the 26-man squad for the 2026 FIFA World Cup on 27 May 2026.

=== International goals ===
Scores and results list Qatar's goal tally first.

No.	Date	Venue	Opponent	Score	Result	Competition
1.	24 March 2018	Basra Sports City, Basra, Iraq	Syria	1–1	2–2	2018 International Friendship Championship
2.	25 January 2019	Zayed Sports City Stadium, Abu Dhabi, United Arab Emirates	South Korea	1–0	1–0	2019 AFC Asian Cup
3.	1 February 2019	Zayed Sports City Stadium, Abu Dhabi, United Arab Emirates	Japan	2–0	3–1	2019 AFC Asian Cup Final
4.	26 November 2019	Khalifa International Stadium, Doha, Qatar	Iraq	1–2	1–2	24th Arabian Gulf Cup
5.	4 December 2020	Jassim bin Hamad Stadium, Doha, Qatar	Bangladesh	1–0	5–0	2022 FIFA World Cup qualification
6.	3 June 2021	Jassim bin Hamad Stadium, Doha, Qatar	India	1–0	1–0	2022 FIFA World Cup qualification
7.	17 July 2021	BBVA Stadium, Houston, United States	Grenada	1–0	4–0	2021 CONCACAF Gold Cup
8.	20 July 2021	BBVA Stadium, Houston, United States	Honduras	2–0	2–0	2021 CONCACAF Gold Cup
9.	24 July 2021	State Farm Stadium, Glendale, United States	El Salvador	2–0	3–2	2021 CONCACAF Gold Cup
10.	30 November 2021	Al Bayt Stadium, Al Khor, Qatar	Bahrain	1–0	1–0	2021 FIFA Arab Cup
11.	10 December 2021	Al Bayt Stadium, Al Khor, Qatar	United Arab Emirates	4–0	5–0	2021 FIFA Arab Cup

== Honours ==
Al-Arabi

- Sheikh Jassim Cup: 2008, 2010, 2011

Al-Gharafa

- Qatari Stars Cup: 2017–18, 2018–19

Al-Rayyan

- Qatari Stars Cup: 2025–26

Qatar

- AFC Asian Cup : 2019, 2023
- Arabian Gulf Cup: 2014
- WAFF Championship: 2014

Individual

- AFC Asian Cup Team of the Tournament: 2019
- FIFA Arab Cup Team of the Tournament: 2021
