= Almoez Ali =

Sudan-born Qatari footballer (born 1996)

- Ali with Qatar in 2026

Personal information
- Full name: Almoez Ali Zainalabedeen Mohamed Abdullah
- Date of birth: 19 August 1996 (age 30)
- Place of birth: Khartoum, Sudan
- Height: 1.80 m (5 ft 11 in)
- Positions: Striker; winger

Team information
- Current team: Al-Duhail
- Number: 11

Youth career
- 2003–2006: Al-Mesaimeer
- 2006–2013: Aspire Academy
- 2013–2014: Lekhwiya
- 2014–2015: Eupen

Senior career*
| Years | Team | Apps | (Gls) |
| 2015 | LASK II | 4 | (5) |
| 2015–2016 | LASK | 7 | (1) |
| 2016 | Cultural Leonesa | 10 | (1) |
| 2016–2017 | Al-Duhail B | 4 | (1) |
| 2016– | Al-Duhail | 170 | (58) |

International career^{‡}
| 2014–2015 | Qatar U20 | 9 | (3) |
| 2016–2018 | Qatar U23 | 7 | (6) |
| 2016– | Qatar | 134 | (61) |
Medal record
Men's football
Representing Qatar
AFC Asian Cup
| Winner | 2019 United Arab Emirates |
| Winner | 2023 Qatar |
FIFA Arab Cup
| Third place | 2021 Qatar |
CONCACAF Gold Cup (guests)
| Bronze medal – third place | 2021 |
- * Club domestic league appearances and goals as of 17 January 2026 ‡ National team caps and goals as of 17 November 2026

Almoez Ali Zainalabedeen Mohamed Abdulla (Arabic: الْمُعِزّ عَلِيّ زَيْن الْعَابِدِين مُحَمَّد عَبْدُ اللّٰه; born 19 August 1996) is a professional footballer who plays as a striker for Qatar Stars League club Al-Duhail, which he currently captains. Born in Sudan, he plays for the Qatar national team.

Ali is currently Qatar's all-time top goalscorer. He was a member of the Qatar national team which won back-to-back Asian Cup titles in 2019 and 2023, at the 2019 Asian Cup, he scored a record nine goals, and was named the tournament's best player. He is also the only footballer to score in three different intercontinental championships, those being the AFC Asian Cup, the Copa América and the CONCACAF Gold Cup.

== Club career ==
=== Early career ===
Ali was born in Sudan and moved to Qatar at an early age. He started playing for Al-Mesaimeer when he was seven years old, then moved to Aspire Academy and also played youth football at Lekhwiya SC. He was also a part of the youth setup for Belgian club Eupen in 2015.

=== LASK ===
In July 2015, Ali joined the senior team of Austrian club LASK. His first and only Austrian Bundesliga league goal for the club's first team came on 27 November 2015 against Floridsdorfer AC, becoming the second Qatari to score a league goal in Austria's top league, after Adel Jadoua Ali.

=== Cultural Leonesa ===
In January 2016, Ali left LASK and joined Cultural Leonesa, which participayed in the Segunda División B. On 3 April 2016, he scored his first goal for the Cultural Leonesa in a 1–0 victory over Arandina, becoming the first Qatari footballer ever to score in a Spanish league.

=== Al-Duhail ===
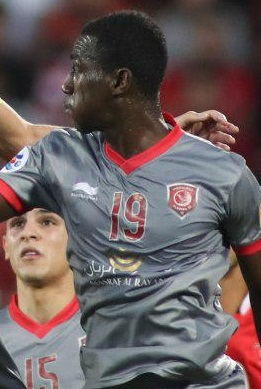
Ali playing for Al-Duhail in 2018

Ali rejoined his former youth club Lekhwiya SC for the 2016–17 league season. He scored his first goal for the club on 27 September 2016 in a 5–4 win against Muaither. He went on to score 8 goals in 25 appearances, as well as providing 8 assists and being awarded as the best U23 player of the season as his club won the Qatar Stars League.

In the following season, Ali was part of the newly rebranded Al-Duhail, as his former club was merged with El Jaish, and was part of the unbeaten 2017–18 Qatar Stars League title campaign.

== International career ==
Ali unofficially made his inaugural appearance for the senior national team in a friendly against Bahrain in December 2013. The match was not recognized by FIFA.

In 2014, Ali was a part of the Qatar U19 team that won the 2014 AFC U-19 Championship, Ali scored 3 goals in the tournament.

In 2015, he was part of the Qatar U20 squad for the 2015 FIFA U-20 World Cup. He played in the three group stage matches, but Qatar did not advance to the knockout stage.

On 8 August 2016, Ali made his official senior debut for the Qatar national team coming on as a substitute in 2–1 win against Iraq. Furthermore, he was the top scorer in the 2018 AFC U-23 Championship with six goals and played an instrumental role in Qatar's third-place ranking.

=== 2019 AFC Asian Cup ===
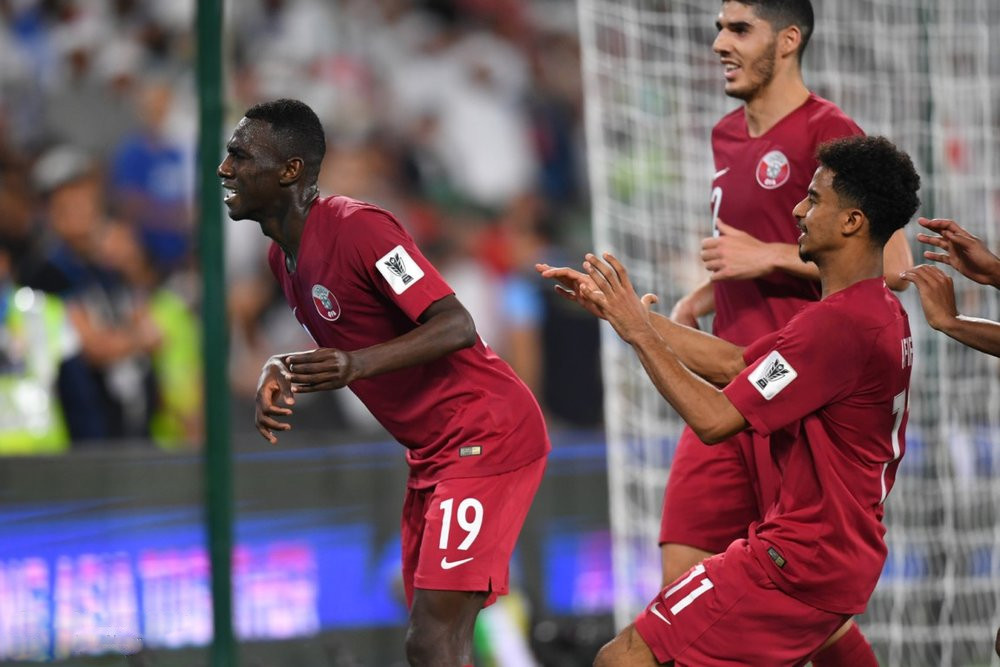
Ali celebrating after scoring a goal against UAE at the 2019 AFC Asian Cup semi-final.

In 2019, Ali was selected for Qatar's squad for the upcoming 2019 AFC Asian Cup. He found the net in his team's first group stage game against Lebanon. In the next game against North Korea, he scored a four goals in a span of 51 minutes, the second fastest time to four goals after Iranian Ali Daei, who scored four goals in 23 minutes against South Korea in the 1996 AFC Asian Cup.

The following match against Saudi Arabia, he increased his tally in the competition to seven goals after scoring a Brace in the 2–0 win. In doing so, he became the joint-top scorer in the AFC Asian Cup Group Stage, sharing the record with Ali Daei of Iran, Choi Soon-ho of South Korea and Naohiro Takahara of Japan. He also broke Mansour Muftah's all-time record of five goals scored for the Qatar national team in the Asian Cup.

In the semi-final against United Arab Emirates, Ali scored his eighth goal of the competition in a 4–0 win, equalling Ali Daei's mark established in 1996 as the most goals scored in a single AFC Asian Cup edition. He broke the record in the following game after scoring the opening goal with a bicycle kick at the 2019 AFC Asian Cup Final match against Japan.

==== Eligibility dispute ====
On 30 January 2019, soon after the 4–0 defeat at the 2019 AFC Asian Cup semifinal, the UAE FA lodged a formal appeal to the AFC over the eligibility of Sudanese-born Almoez Ali and Iraqi-born Bassam Al-Rawi, claiming that they did not qualify to play for Qatar on residency grounds based on Article 7 of the FIFA statute which states that a player's eligibility to play for a representative team if he has "lived continuously for at least five years after reaching the age of 18 on the territory of the relevant association". It was alleged that Almoez had not lived continuously in Qatar for at least five years over the age of 18, although the player claimed that his mother was born in Qatar. On 1 February 2019, the AFC Disciplinary and Ethics Committee dismissed the protest lodged by the United Arab Emirates Football Association without further comments or explanation. In August 2020, the case was finally settled at CAS (Court of Arbirtration for Sport, based in Lausanne, Switzerland) with the UAE losing its appeal against the Asian Football Confederation's (AFC) decision.

=== 2019–2022: Invitation tournaments and 2022 FIFA World Cup ===
On 16 June 2019, Ali scored in Qatar's 2–2 draw with Paraguay in the 2019 Copa América. Ali was included in Qatar's squad for the 2021 CONCACAF Gold Cup. He scored four goals in the competition and clinched the top goal-scorer award.

In November 2022, he played in the 2022 FIFA World Cup. Featuring in all three group matches as Qatar made its first appearance at the FIFA World Cup tournament.

=== 2023 AFC Asian Cup ===
In January 2024, Ali was included in Qatar's squad for the 2023 AFC Asian Cup. In the opening match of the tournament, he scored Qatar's second goal in a 3–0 win over Lebanon in Lusail. In the semi-final match against Iran, he scored the winning goal in a 3–2 victory, which qualified his country to their second final in a row. On 10 February 2024, Ali won the 2023 AFC Asian Cup, being a instrumental part in the team's success.

On 16 November 2023, Ali scored his a poker goal for Qatar during the 2026 FIFA World Cup qualification match against Afghanistan in a thrashing 8–1 victory, surpassing Mansour Muftah as the all-time top goalscorer.

== Career statistics ==
=== Club ===
As of match played 24 January 2025

Appearances and goals by club, season and competition
| Club | Season | League | | | National cup (Note: Includes Austrian Cup, Emir of Qatar Cup) | | Continental | | Other | | Total | |
| Club | Season | Division | Apps | Goals | Apps | Goals | Apps | Goals | Apps | Goals | Apps | Goals |
|---|---|---|---|---|---|---|---|---|---|---|---|---|
| LASK II | 2015 | Austrian Regionalliga | 4 | 5 | — | | — | | — | | 4 | 5 |
| LASK | 2015–16 | Austrian Second League | 7 | 1 | 2 | 0 | — | | — | | 9 | 1 |
| Cultural Leonesa | 2016 | Segunda División B | 10 | 1 | — | | — | | — | | 10 | 1 |
| Al-Duhail B | 2016–17 | QSD | 4 | 1 | — | | — | | — | | 4 | 1 |
| Al-Duhail | 2016–17 | QSL | 25 | 8 | 2 | 0 | 7 (Note: Appearances in AFC Champions League) | 1 | 2 (Note: One appearance in Sheikh Jassim Cup, one appearance in Qatar Cup) | 0 | 36 | 9 |
| Al-Duhail | 2017–18 | QSL | 16 | 7 | 3 | 2 | 10 | 2 | 3 (Note: One appearance and one goal in Sheikh Jassim Cup, two appearances in Qatar Cup) | 1 | 32 | 12 |
| Al-Duhail | 2018–19 | QSL | 18 | 3 | 3 | 0 | 5 | 1 | 1 (Note: Appearance in Sheikh Jassim Cup) | 0 | 27 | 4 |
| Al-Duhail | 2019–20 | QSL | 19 | 7 | 2 | 2 | 6 | 3 | 2 (Note: Appearances in Qatar Cup) | 1 | 29 | 13 |
| Al-Duhail | 2020–21 | QSL | 20 | 6 | 3 | 0 | 6 | 0 | 4 (Note: Two appearances in Qatar Cup, two appearances and one goal in FIFA Club World Cup) | 1 | 33 | 7 |
| Al-Duhail | 2021–22 | QSL | 17 | 7 | 3 | 2 | 5 | 2 | 0 | 0 | 25 | 11 |
| Al-Duhail | 2022–23 | QSL | 14 | 4 | 1 | 0 | 3 | 0 | 4 (Note: One appearance in Qatari Stars Cup, three appearances in Qatar Cup) | 0 | 22 | 4 |
| Al-Duhail | 2023–24 | QSL | 19 | 7 | 3 | 0 | 6 | 1 | 1 | 0 | 29 | 8 |
| Al-Duhail | 2024–25 | QSL | 13 | 7 | 0 | 0 | 0 | 0 | 0 | 0 | 13 | 7 |
| Al-Duhail | Total | | 161 | 56 | 20 | 6 | 48 | 10 | 17 | 3 | 244 | 75 |
| Career total | | | 186 | 64 | 20 | 6 | 48 | 10 | 17 | 3 | 276 | 84 |

=== International ===
As of match played 17 November 2026

Appearances and goals by national team and year
| National team | Year | Apps | Goals |
|---|---|---|---|
| Qatar | 2013 | 1 | 0 |
| Qatar | 2016 | 3 | 0 |
| Qatar | 2017 | 17 | 5 |
| Qatar | 2018 | 11 | 5 |
| Qatar | 2019 | 20 | 15 |
| Qatar | 2020 | 4 | 4 |
| Qatar | 2021 | 24 | 10 |
| Qatar | 2022 | 15 | 3 |
| Qatar | 2023 | 10 | 8 |
| Qatar | 2024 | 18 | 10 |
| Qatar | 2025 | 4 | 0 |
| Qatar | 2026 | 7 | 1 |
| Total | | 134 | 61 |

== Honours ==
Al-Duhail

- Qatar Stars League: 2016–17, 2017–18, 2019–20, 2022–23
- Emir of Qatar Cup: 2018, 2019, 2022
- Qatar Cup: 2018, 2023
- Qatari Stars Cup: 2022–23
- Sheikh Jassim Cup: 2016

Qatar U19

- AFC U-19 Championship: 2014

Qatar

- AFC Asian Cup: 2019, 2023
- WAFF Championship: 2014

Individual

- AFC U-23 Championship top goalscorer: 2018
- AFC Asian Cup top goalscorer: 2019
- AFC Asian Cup Best Player: 2019
- AFC Asian Cup Team of the Tournament: 2019, 2023
- IFFHS AFC Men's Team of the Decade 2011–2020
- CONCACAF Gold Cup Golden Boot: 2021
- CONCACAF Gold Cup Best XI: 2021

== See also ==
- List of top international men's football goalscorers by country
- List of men's footballers with 100 or more international caps
- List of men's footballers with 50 or more international goals
