= 2021 CONCACAF Gold Cup Group D =

Football competition

Group D of the 2021 CONCACAF Gold Cup took place from 13 to 20 July 2021 in Houston's BBVA Stadium and Orlando's Exploria Stadium. The group consisted of Grenada, Honduras, Panama, and invitees Qatar. The top two teams, Qatar and Honduras, advanced to the quarter-finals, while the other two teams were eliminated.

== Teams ==
Draw position	Team	Pot	Method of qualification	Date of qualification	Finals appearance only Gold Cup era (since 1991)	Last appearance	Previous best performance only Gold Cup era (since 1991)	CONCACAF Rankings		FIFA Rankings (May 2021)
Draw position	Team	Pot	Method of qualification	Date of qualification	Finals appearance only Gold Cup era (since 1991)	Last appearance	Previous best performance only Gold Cup era (since 1991)	August 2020 (Note: The CONCACAF rankings of August 2020 were used for seeding for the final draw.)	July 2021 (Note: CONCACAF rankings at the start of the tournament (as of 1 July 2021).)	FIFA Rankings (May 2021)
D1	Honduras	1	CNL League A Group C 1st place	13 October 2019	15th	2019	Runners-up (1991)	4	5	67
D2	Panama	2	CNL League A Group B 2nd place	16 November 2019	10th	2019	Runners-up (2005, 2013)	8	7	78
D3	Grenada	3	CNL League B Group A 1st place	17 November 2019	3rd	2011	Group stage (2009, 2011)	20	23	160
D4	Qatar	4	Invitee	2 September 2020	1st	—	Debut	—	—	58

== Standings ==
Pos	Team	Pld	W	D	L	GF	GA	GD	Pts	Qualification
1	Qatar	3	2	1	0	9	3	+6	7	Advance to knockout stage
2	Honduras	3	2	0	1	7	4	+3	6	Advance to knockout stage
3	Panama	3	1	1	1	8	7	+1	4	
4	Grenada	3	0	0	3	1	11	−10	0	

Source: CONCACAF
Rules for classification: Group stage tiebreakers

In the quarter-finals:

- The winners of Group D, Qatar, advanced to play the runners-up of Group A, El Salvador.
- The runners-up of Group D, Honduras, advanced to play the winners of Group A, Mexico.

== Matches ==
=== Qatar vs Panama ===
13 July 2021
20:50 (19:50 UTC−5) (Note: The Qatar vs Panama match, originally scheduled at 19:00 EDT (UTC−4), was delayed until 20:50 EDT due to thunderstorms in the area.)

Qatar	3–3	Panama
Afif 48'; Ali 53'; Al-Haydos 63' (pen.)	Report	Blackburn 51', 58'; Davis 79' (pen.)

BBVA Stadium, Houston
Attendance: 10,625
Referee: César Ramos (Mexico)

Qatar	Panama

GK	22	Meshaal Barsham
CB	15	Bassam Al-Rawi
CB	16	Boualem Khoukhi
CB	3	Abdelkarim Hassan
RWB	2	Ró-Ró		(substituted off) 90'
LWB	14	Homam Ahmed
CM	10	Hassan Al-Haydos (c)		(substituted off) 80'
CM	12	Karim Boudiaf
CM	6	Abdulaziz Hatem		(substituted off) 90+6'
CF	11	Akram Afif	(yellow card) 90'
CF	19	Almoez Ali		(substituted off) 86'
Substitutions:
MF	20	Abdullah Al-Ahrak		(substituted on) 80'
FW	9	Mohammed Muntari		(substituted on) 86'
DF	13	Musab Kheder		(substituted on) 90'
MF	4	Mohammed Waad		(substituted on) 90+6'
Head coach:
(Spain) Félix Sánchez

GK	1	Luis Mejía
RB	2	Francisco Palacios
CB	3	Harold Cummings (c)
CB	5	Richard Peralta
LB	15	Eric Davis
RM	19	Alberto Quintero
CM	8	Adalberto Carrasquilla
CM	11	Armando Cooper	(substituted off) 71'
LM	7	José Luis Rodríguez	(substituted off) 85'
CF	10	Yoel Bárcenas
CF	14	Rolando Blackburn	(substituted off) 80'
Substitutions:
MF	20	Abdiel Ayarza	(substituted on) 71'
FW	17	José Fajardo	(substituted on) 80'
MF	21	César Yanis	(substituted on) 85'
Head coach:
(Spain) Thomas Christiansen

Man of the Match:
Rolando Blackburn (Panama)

Assistant referees:
Alberto Morín (Mexico)
Miguel Hernández (Mexico)
Fourth official:
Bryan López (Guatemala)
Video assistant referee:
Carlos Ayala (Mexico)
Assistant video assistant referee:
Ricardo Montero (Costa Rica)

=== Honduras vs Grenada ===
13 July 2021
23:10 (22:10 UTC−5) (Note: The Honduras vs Grenada match, originally scheduled at 21:00 EDT (UTC−4), was delayed until 23:10 EDT due to the weather delay in the first match between Qatar and Panama.)

Honduras	4–0	Grenada
Bengtson 28'; Solano 52'; Leverón 86'; Quioto 88'	Report

BBVA Stadium, Houston
Attendance: 10,625
Referee: Fernando Guerrero (Mexico)

Honduras	Grenada

GK	22	Luis López
RB	2	Félix Crisanto
CB	21	Kevin Álvarez
CB	3	Maynor Figueroa (c)
LB	23	Diego Rodríguez	(substituted off) 79'
CM	20	Deybi Flores
CM	14	Boniek García	(substituted off) 79'
RW	8	Walter Martínez	(substituted off) 64'
AM	10	Alexander López
LW	19	Edwin Solano	(substituted off) 79'
CF	11	Jerry Bengtson	(substituted off) 63'
Substitutions:
FW	12	Romell Quioto	(substituted on) 63'
FW	7	Alberth Elis	(substituted on) 64'
DF	16	Johnny Leverón	(substituted on) 79'
MF	6	Bryan Acosta	(substituted on) 79'
MF	13	Jhow Benavídez	(substituted on) 79'
Head coach:
(Uruguay) Fabián Coito

GK	12	Reice Charles-Cook
RB	2	Benjamin Ettienne	(substituted off) 80'
CB	5	Omar Beckles
CB	4	Aaron Pierre (c)	(substituted off) 60'
LB	13	Regan Charles-Cook	(substituted off) 72'
CM	6	Oliver Norburn
CM	16	A. J. Paterson
RW	20	Jacob Berkeley-Agyepong	(substituted off) 72'
AM	11	Shavon John-Brown
LW	17	Tyrone Sterling
CF	23	Jamal Charles	(substituted off) 60'
Substitutions:
MF	8	Alexander McQueen	(substituted on) 60'
FW	14	Dejon Noel-Williams	(substituted on) 60'
MF	7	Romar Frank	(substituted on) 72'
FW	10	Saydrel Lewis	(substituted on) 72'
MF	19	Kwazim Theodore	(substituted on) 80'
Head coach:
(Canada) Michael Findlay

Man of the Match:
Deybi Flores (Honduras)

Assistant referees:
Michel Morales (Mexico)
Henri Pupiro (Nicaragua)
Fourth official:
Pierre-Luc Lauzière (Canada)
Video assistant referee:
Arturo Cruz (Mexico)
Assistant video assistant referee:
Tatiana Guzmán (Nicaragua)

=== Grenada vs Qatar ===
17 July 2021
19:30 (18:30 UTC−5)

Grenada	0–4	Qatar
	Report	Hatem 11'; Afif 22'; Muntari 36'; Ali 46'

BBVA Stadium, Houston
Attendance: 7,173
Referee: Armando Villarreal (United States)

Grenada	Qatar

GK	1	Jason Belfon
RB	2	Benjamin Ettienne
CB	5	Omar Beckles
CB	4	Aaron Pierre (c)	(yellow card) 31'
LB	13	Regan Charles-Cook		(substituted off) 76'
DM	20	Jacob Berkeley-Agyepong		(substituted off) 79'
CM	16	A. J. Paterson
CM	11	Shavon John-Brown		(substituted off) 76'
RW	6	Oliver Norburn		(substituted off) 75'
LW	17	Tyrone Sterling
CF	14	Dejon Noel-Williams		(substituted off) 46'
Substitutions:
FW	15	Ricky German	(yellow card) 67'	(substituted on) 46'
MF	8	Alexander McQueen		(substituted on) 75'
FW	10	Saydrel Lewis		(substituted on) 76'
MF	7	Romar Frank		(substituted on) 76'
FW	23	Jamal Charles		(substituted on) 79'
Head coach:
(Canada) Michael Findlay

GK	22	Meshaal Barsham
CB	5	Tarek Salman
CB	16	Boualem Khoukhi	(substituted off) 41'
CB	14	Homam Ahmed
RWB	2	Ró-Ró
LWB	3	Abdelkarim Hassan
CM	12	Karim Boudiaf	(substituted off) 59'
CM	6	Abdulaziz Hatem (c)	(substituted off) 72'
CM	11	Akram Afif
CF	19	Almoez Ali	(substituted off) 72'
CF	9	Mohammed Muntari	(substituted off) 60'
Substitutions:
DF	15	Bassam Al-Rawi	(substituted on) 41'
MF	23	Assim Madibo	(substituted on) 59'
FW	7	Ahmed Alaaeldin	(substituted on) 60'
FW	10	Hassan Al-Haydos	(substituted on) 72'
MF	20	Abdullah Al-Ahrak	(substituted on) 72'
Head coach:
(Spain) Félix Sánchez

Man of the Match:
Akram Afif (Qatar)

Assistant referees:
Logan Brown (United States)
Juan Carlos Mora (Costa Rica)
Fourth official:
Daneon Parchment (Jamaica)
Video assistant referee:
Arturo Cruz (Mexico)
Assistant video assistant referee:
León Barajas (Mexico)

=== Panama vs Honduras ===
17 July 2021
21:30 (20:30 UTC−5)

Panama	2–3	Honduras
Davis 32' (pen.); Yanis 45+1'	Report	Quioto 22', 65'; A. López 61'

BBVA Stadium, Houston
Attendance: 3,508
Referee: Bakary Gassama (Gambia)

Panama	Honduras

GK	1	Luis Mejía
RB	2	Francisco Palacios	(yellow card) 13'
CB	3	Harold Cummings (c)		(substituted off) 35'
CB	16	Roderick Miller	(yellow card) 54'	(substituted off) 67'
LB	15	Eric Davis
RM	10	Yoel Bárcenas
CM	11	Armando Cooper
CM	8	Adalberto Carrasquilla	(yellow card) 83'
LM	21	César Yanis		(substituted off) 67'
SS	19	Alberto Quintero		(substituted off) 62'
CF	14	Rolando Blackburn		(substituted off) 62'
Substitutions:
DF	13	Adolfo Machado		(substituted on) 35'
MF	20	Abdiel Ayarza		(substituted on) 62'
FW	17	José Fajardo		(substituted on) 62'
DF	5	Richard Peralta		(substituted on) 67'
MF	7	José Luis Rodríguez		(substituted on) 67'
Head coach:
(Spain) Thomas Christiansen

GK	22	Luis López
RB	2	Félix Crisanto	(yellow card) 90+3'
CB	21	Kevin Álvarez
CB	3	Maynor Figueroa (c)	(yellow card) 17'
LB	23	Diego Rodríguez		(substituted off) 90+4'
RM	14	Boniek García		(substituted off) 46'
CM	20	Deybi Flores
LM	6	Bryan Acosta
AM	10	Alexander López		(substituted off) 84'
CF	7	Alberth Elis		(substituted off) 46'
CF	12	Romell Quioto		(substituted off) 71'
Substitutions:
DF	16	Johnny Leverón		(substituted on) 46'
MF	13	Jhow Benavídez		(substituted on) 46'
FW	11	Jerry Bengtson		(substituted on) 71'
MF	15	Juan Delgado		(substituted on) 84'
DF	17	Franklin Flores		(substituted on) 90+4'
Head coach:
(Uruguay) Fabián Coito

Man of the Match:
Romell Quioto (Honduras)

Assistant referees:
Djibril Camará (Senegal)
Micheal Barwegen (Canada)
Fourth official:
Nima Saghafi (United States)
Video assistant referee:
Drew Fischer (Canada)
Assistant video assistant referee:
Rubiel Vazquez (United States)

=== Honduras vs Qatar ===
20 July 2021
21:30 (20:30 UTC−5)

Honduras	0–2	Qatar
	Report	Ahmed 25'; Hatem 90+5'

BBVA Stadium, Houston
Attendance: 12,630
Referee: Jair Marrufo (United States)

Honduras	Qatar

GK	22	Luis López
CB	21	Kevin Álvarez
CB	3	Maynor Figueroa (c)		(substituted off) 45+1'
CB	23	Diego Rodríguez		(substituted off) 62'
RWB	2	Félix Crisanto		(substituted off) 61'
LWB	16	Johnny Leverón
CM	10	Alexander López
CM	6	Bryan Acosta		(substituted off) 62'
AM	13	Jhow Benavídez
AM	20	Deybi Flores
CF	12	Romell Quioto		(substituted off) 26'
Substitutions:
FW	11	Jerry Bengtson	(yellow card) 31'	(substituted on) 26'
DF	4	Marcelo Pereira		(substituted on) 45+1'
DF	5	Raúl Santos		(substituted on) 61'
MF	15	Juan Delgado		(substituted on) 62'
MF	14	Boniek García		(substituted on) 62'
Head coach:
(Uruguay) Fabián Coito

GK	22	Meshaal Barsham
CB	15	Bassam Al-Rawi
CB	16	Boualem Khoukhi
CB	3	Abdelkarim Hassan
RWB	2	Ró-Ró
LWB	14	Homam Ahmed
CM	10	Hassan Al-Haydos (c)	(substituted off) 70'
CM	6	Abdulaziz Hatem
CM	12	Karim Boudiaf	(substituted off) 83'
CF	11	Akram Afif	(substituted off) 88'
CF	19	Almoez Ali	(substituted off) 69'
Substitutions:
FW	9	Mohammed Muntari	(substituted on) 69'
MF	20	Abdullah Al-Ahrak	(substituted on) 70'
MF	23	Assim Madibo	(substituted on) 83'
FW	7	Ahmed Alaaeldin	(substituted on) 88'
Head coach:
(Spain) Félix Sánchez

Man of the Match:
Luis López (Honduras)

Assistant referees:
Frank Anderson (United States)
Kathryn Nesbitt (United States)
Fourth official:
Nima Saghafi (United States)
Video assistant referee:
Tim Ford (United States)
Assistant video assistant referee:
Daneon Parchment (Jamaica)

=== Panama vs Grenada ===
20 July 2021
23:30 (Note: The Panama vs Grenada match, originally scheduled at 21:30 EDT (UTC−4), was delayed until 23:30 EDT due to the weather delay in the Group C match between Costa Rica and Jamaica.)

Panama	3–1	Grenada
Quintero 7'; Rodríguez 27', 64'	Report	Frank 76'

Exploria Stadium, Orlando
Attendance: 1,548
Referee: César Ramos (Mexico)

Panama	Grenada

GK	12	José Calderón
RB	4	Omar Córdoba
CB	13	Adolfo Machado (c)
CB	16	Roderick Miller
LB	5	Richard Peralta
CM	20	Abdiel Ayarza	(substituted off) 46'
CM	8	Adalberto Carrasquilla	(substituted off) 69'
CM	21	César Yanis	(substituted off) 46'
RF	19	Alberto Quintero	(substituted off) 69'
CF	9	Gabriel Torres
LF	7	José Luis Rodríguez	(substituted off) 73'
Substitutions:
MF	23	Miguel Camargo	(substituted on) 46'
MF	10	Yoel Bárcenas	(substituted on) 46'
MF	6	Víctor Griffith	(substituted on) 69'
FW	18	Jorman Aguilar	(substituted on) 69'
FW	14	Rolando Blackburn	(substituted on) 73'
Head coach:
(Spain) Thomas Christiansen

GK	12	Reice Charles-Cook
RB	17	Tyrone Sterling		(substituted off) 24'
CB	5	Omar Beckles
CB	4	Aaron Pierre (c)
LB	16	A. J. Paterson
DM	11	Shavon John-Brown
CM	6	Oliver Norburn	(yellow card) 26'
CM	20	Jacob Berkeley-Agyepong		(substituted off) 56'
RW	8	Alexander McQueen		(substituted off) 57'
LW	13	Regan Charles-Cook		(substituted off) 57'
CF	10	Saydrel Lewis		(substituted off) 46'
Substitutions:
FW	2	Benjamin Ettienne	(yellow card) 30'	(substituted on) 24'
FW	14	Dejon Noel-Williams		(substituted on) 46'
FW	23	Jamal Charles		(substituted on) 56'
MF	7	Romar Frank		(substituted on) 57'
MF	19	Kwazim Theodore		(substituted on) 57'
Head coach:
(Canada) Michael Findlay

Man of the Match:
José Luis Rodríguez (Panama)

Assistant referees:
Alberto Morín (Mexico)
Jassett Kerr (Jamaica)
Fourth official:
Drew Fischer (Canada)
Video assistant referee:
Ángel Monroy (Mexico)
Assistant video assistant referee:
León Barajas (Mexico)

== Discipline ==
Fair play points would have been used as a tiebreaker if the overall and head-to-head records of teams were tied. These were calculated based on yellow and red cards received in all group matches as follows:

- first yellow card: minus 1 point;
- indirect red card (second yellow card): minus 3 points;
- direct red card: minus 4 points;
- yellow card and direct red card: minus 5 points;

Only one of the above deductions was applied to a player in a single match.

Team	Match 1				Match 2				Match 3				Points
Team	Booked	(yellow card) (yellow-red card)	Sent off (straight red)	(yellow card) (red card)	Booked	(yellow card) (yellow-red card)	Sent off (straight red)	(yellow card) (red card)	Booked	(yellow card) (yellow-red card)	Sent off (straight red)	(yellow card) (red card)	Points
Qatar	1												–1
Honduras					2				1				–3
Panama					3								–3
Grenada					2				2				–4
