= 2021 CONCACAF Gold Cup =

16th edition of the CONCACAF Gold Cup

Copa Oro de la CONCACAF 2021 (Spanish)
- This Is Ours; Spanish: Esto Es Nuestro

Tournament details
- Host country: United States
- Dates: July 10 – August 1
- Teams: 16 (from 2 confederations)
- Venues: 10 (in 9 host cities)

Final positions
- Champions: United States (7th title)
- Runners-up: Mexico

Tournament statistics
- Matches played: 31
- Goals scored: 89 (2.87 per match)
- Attendance: 636,770 (20,541 per match)
- Top scorer(s): (Qatar) Almoez Ali (4 goals)
- Best player: (Mexico) Héctor Herrera
- Best young player: (Canada) Tajon Buchanan
- Best goalkeeper: (United States) Matt Turner
- Fair play award: United States

The 2021 CONCACAF Gold Cup was the 16th edition of the CONCACAF Gold Cup, the biennial international men's soccer championship of the North, Central American, and Caribbean regions organized by CONCACAF.

The tournament was originally scheduled from 2 through July 25, 2021, but was later rescheduled for July 10 through August 1. Mexico were the defending champions. For the first time, the video assistant referee (VAR) system was used at the tournament.

The United States won their seventh Gold Cup title by defeating Mexico 1–0 in the final at Allegiant Stadium in Paradise, Nevada.

== Qualified teams ==
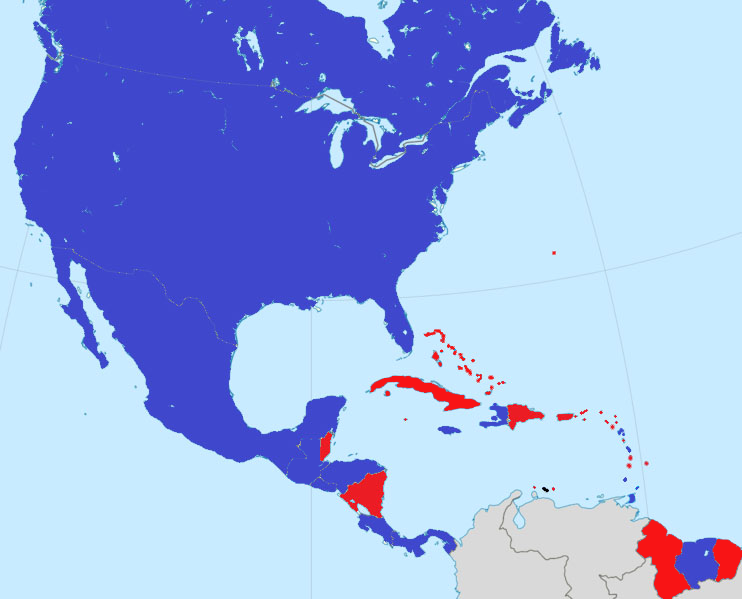
Team qualified for CONCACAF Gold Cup Team failed to qualify Team withdrew

Twelve teams qualified directly via the 2019–20 CONCACAF Nations League. These were the four group winners of League A, four group runners-up of League A and the four group winners of League B.

Furthermore, twelve teams were entered into the 2021 CONCACAF Gold Cup qualification tournament (GCQ), also based on the results of the 2019–20 CONCACAF Nations League. These teams were the four group third-placed teams of League A, the four group runners-up of League B, and the four group winners of League C.

In the original format as announced in September 2019, four teams were to advance out of the GCQ. However, in September 2020, CONCACAF announced that 2019 AFC Asian Cup champions and 2022 FIFA World Cup hosts Qatar would participate as a guest in the 2021 and 2023 tournaments. It was the first time since 2005 that a non-CONCACAF association took part in the tournament. Consequently, just three teams qualified for the 2021 edition via the qualifiers.

On July 9, 2021, CONCACAF announced that Curaçao, which had originally qualified as the 2019–20 CONCACAF Nations League A Group D runners-up, would not participate in the tournament because of its high number of COVID-19 cases. They were replaced in Group A by Guatemala, the next-highest ranked team in qualifying.

| Team | Qualification (Note: CNL indicates 2019–20 CONCACAF Nations League, GCQ indicates 2021 CONCACAF Gold Cup Qualifiers.) | Date of qualification | Gold Cup appearances (+ CONCACAF Championship) | Last appearance (+ CONCACAF Championship) | Previous best Gold Cup performance (Note: Bold indicates that the corresponding team was hosting or co-hosting the event.) (+ CONCACAF Championship) | FIFA Ranking at start of event | CONCACAF Ranking at start of event |
|---|---|---|---|---|---|---|---|
| Canada | CNL League A Group A runners-up | October 11, 2019 | 15th (18th) | 2019 | Champions (2000); Champions (1985) | 70 | 3 |
| Honduras | CNL League A Group C winners | October 13, 2019 | 15th (21st) | 2019 | Runners-up (1991); Champions (**1981**) | 67 | 5 |
| Grenada | CNL League B Group A winners | November 14, 2019 | 3rd (3rd) | 2011 | Group stage (2009, 2011) | 160 | 23 |
| Jamaica | CNL League B Group C winners | November 15, 2019 | 12th (14th) | 2019 | Runners-up (2015, 2017) | 45 | 6 |
| United States (host) | CNL League A Group A winners | November 15, 2019 | 16th (18th) | 2019 | Champions (**1991**, **2002**, **2005**, **2007**, **2013**, **2017**) | 20 | 2 |
| Mexico (title holders) | CNL League A Group B winners | November 15, 2019 | 16th (24th) | 2019 | Champions (**1993**, 1996, 1998, **2003**, 2009, 2011, 2015, 2019); Champions (1965, 1971, **1977**) | 11 | 1 |
| El Salvador | CNL League B Group B winners | November 16, 2019 | 12th (18th) | 2019 | Quarter-finals (2002, 2003, 2011, 2013, 2017); Runners-up (**1963**, 1981) | 69 | 10 |
| Costa Rica | CNL League A Group D winners | November 17, 2019 | 15th (21st) | 2019 | Runners-up (2002); Champions (1963, **1969**, 1989) | 50 | 4 |
| Martinique | CNL League A Group C runners-up | November 17, 2019 | 7th (7th) | 2019 | Quarter-finals (2002) | —N/a (Note: Martinique and Guadeloupe are not FIFA members, so they have no FIFA ranking.) | 11 |
| Suriname | CNL League B Group D winners | November 18, 2019 | 1st (3rd) | N/A (1985) | Debut; 6th place (1977) | 136 | 15 |
| Panama | CNL League A Group B runners-up | November 19, 2019 | 10th (11th) | 2019 | Runners-up (2005, 2013) | 78 | 7 |
| Qatar | Invited guest | September 2, 2020 | 1st | N/A | Debut | 58 | N/A |
| Trinidad and Tobago | GCQ winners | July 6, 2021 | 11th (16th) | 2019 | Third place (2000) | 103 | 13 |
| Haiti | GCQ winners | July 6, 2021 | 8th (16th) | 2019 | Semi-finals (2019) Champions (1973) | 83 | 9 |
| Guadeloupe | GCQ winners | July 6, 2021 | 4th (4th) | 2011 | Semi-finals (2007) | —N/a | 16 |
| Guatemala | Next best-ranked team from GCQ | July 9, 2021 | 11th (19th) | 2015 | Fourth place (1996); Champions (1967) | 127 | 8 |

== Venues ==
On April 13, 2021, CONCACAF announced that the final would take place on August 1, 2021, at Allegiant Stadium in Paradise, Nevada. On April 22, CONCACAF confirmed the tournament would be held across 9 cities in the U.S.

| Dallas | Arlington (Dallas/Fort Worth Area) | Houston | |
|---|---|---|---|
| Cotton Bowl | AT&T Stadium | NRG Stadium | BBVA Stadium |
| Capacity: 92,100 | Capacity: 80,000 | Capacity: 71,795 | Capacity: 22,039 |
| Glendale (Phoenix Area) | Location of the host cities of the 2021 CONCACAF Gold Cup. | | Paradise (Las Vegas Area) |
| State Farm Stadium | Location of the host cities of the 2021 CONCACAF Gold Cup. | | Allegiant Stadium |
| Capacity: 63,400 | Location of the host cities of the 2021 CONCACAF Gold Cup. | | Capacity: 61,000 |
| Orlando | Austin | Frisco (Dallas/Fort Worth Area) | Kansas City |
| Exploria Stadium | Q2 Stadium | Toyota Stadium | Children's Mercy Park |
| Capacity: 25,500 | Capacity: 20,500 | Capacity: 20,500 | Capacity: 18,467 |

== Final draw ==
The group stage draw took place in Miami, Florida, United States on September 28, 2020, 20:00 EDT (UTC−4), along with the draw for the preliminary round. This was the first ever group stage draw for the Gold Cup. The teams were split into four pots based on the CONCACAF Rankings of August 2020. The four teams of Pot 1 were automatically seeded, with Mexico in Group A, the United States in Group B, Costa Rica in Group C and Honduras in Group D. Guests Qatar were placed in Pot 4 and pre-drawn into Group D, which began play on the latest date, as they were also slated to participate in the 2021 Copa América prior to the Gold Cup before subsequently withdrawing from that tournament.

=== Seeding ===
The following was the composition of the draw pots (pots were based on the August 2020 CONCACAF Rankings, and teams in italics are prelim winners whose identity was not known at the time of the seeding):

Pot 1
| Team | Rank |
|---|---|
| Mexico | 1 |
| United States | 2 |
| Costa Rica | 3 |
| Honduras | 4 |

Pot 2
| Team | Rank |
|---|---|
| Jamaica | 5 |
| Canada | 6 |
| Panama | 8 |
| El Salvador | 10 |

Pot 3
| Team | Rank |
|---|---|
| Martinique | 11 |
| Curaçao | 13 |
| Suriname | 15 |
| Grenada | 20 |

Pot 4
| Team | Rank |
|---|---|
| Haiti | —N/a |
| Guadeloupe | —N/a |
| Trinidad and Tobago | —N/a |
| Qatar | —N/a |

=== Draw results and group fixtures ===
The draw resulted in the following groups (teams in italics are prelim winners whose identity was not known at the time of the draw):

Group A
| Pos | Team |
|---|---|
| A1 | Mexico |
| A2 | El Salvador |
| A3 | Guatemala (Note: Guatemala failed to qualify for the tournament, but replaced Curaçao after the team had to withdraw following a COVID-19 outbreak.) |
| A4 | Trinidad and Tobago |

Group B
| Pos | Team |
|---|---|
| B1 | United States |
| B2 | Canada |
| B3 | Martinique |
| B4 | Haiti |

Group C
| Pos | Team |
|---|---|
| C1 | Costa Rica |
| C2 | Jamaica |
| C3 | Suriname |
| C4 | Guadeloupe |

Group D
| Pos | Team |
|---|---|
| D1 | Honduras |
| D2 | Panama |
| D3 | Grenada |
| D4 | Qatar |

Group stage schedule
| Matchday | Dates | Matches |
|---|---|---|
| Matchday 1 | July 10–13, 2021 | 2 v 3, 1 v 4 |
| Matchday 2 | July 14–17, 2021 | 4 v 2, 3 v 1 |
| Matchday 3 | July 18–20, 2021 | 1 v 2, 3 v 4 |

== Squads ==
Each team had to submit a list of 23 players, of which three players had to be goalkeepers.

== Match officials ==
On June 29, 2021, CONCACAF announced a total of 19 referees, 25 assistant referees and 12 video assistant referees (VAR) appointed for the tournament. In addition, the CONCACAF Referee Committee approved the participation of 12 referees from CONCACAF's Targeted Advanced Referee Program (TARP) who trained with elite officials in order to prepare for future competitions.

Gambian referee Bakary Gassama and Senegalese assistant referee Djibril Camará participated in the tournament as part of a referee exchange between the Confederation of African Football and CONCACAF. Originally, the African refereeing team was also conformed by referee Maguette N'Diaye and assistant referee El Hadji Samba, both from Senegal. However, these two officials had problems with their visas, preventing them from traveling.

Referees

- (Canada) Drew Fischer
- (Costa Rica) Ricardo Montero
- (Costa Rica) Juan Gabriel Calderón
- (The Gambia) Bakary Gassama
- (Grenada) Reon Radix
- (Guatemala) Mario Escobar
- (Guatemala) Bryan López
- (Honduras) Selvin Brown
- (Honduras) Saíd Martínez
- (Jamaica) Oshane Nation
- (Jamaica) Daneon Parchment
- (Mexico) Adonai Escobedo
- (Mexico) Fernando Guerrero
- (Mexico) Fernando Hernández
- (Mexico) César Ramos
- (El Salvador) Iván Barton
- (El Salvador) Ismael Cornejo
- (United States) Jair Marrufo
- (United States) Armando Villarreal
- (United States) Ismail Elfath

Assistant referees

- (Antigua and Barbuda) Iroots Appleton
- (Canada) Micheal Barwegen
- (Costa Rica) William Arrieta
- (Costa Rica) Juan Carlos Mora
- (Guatemala) Gerson López
- (Honduras) Walter López
- (Honduras) Christian Ramírez
- (Honduras) Roney Salinas
- (Jamaica) Nicholas Anderson
- (Jamaica) Ojay Duhaney
- (Jamaica) Jassett Kerr
- (Mexico) Miguel Hernández
- (Mexico) Michel Morales
- (Mexico) Alberto Morín
- (Nicaragua) Henri Pupiro
- (El Salvador) Geovany García
- (El Salvador) David Morán
- (El Salvador) Juan Zumba
- (Senegal) Djibril Camará
- (Suriname) Zachari Zeegelaar
- (Trinidad and Tobago) Caleb Wales
- (United States) Frank Anderson
- (United States) Kyle Atkins
- (United States) Logan Brown
- (United States) Kathryn Nesbitt
- (United States) Corey Parker

Video assistant referees

- (Canada) David Gantar
- (Mexico) Carlos Ayala
- (Mexico) Arturo Cruz
- (Mexico) León Barajas
- (Mexico) Erick Miranda
- (Mexico) Ángel Monroy
- (Mexico) Juan Rangel
- (Nicaragua) Tatiana Guzmán
- (United States) Allen Chapman
- (United States) Tim Ford
- (United States) Edvin Jurisevic
- (United States) Chris Penso

Targeted advanced referee program (TARP)

- (Canada) Pierre-Luc Lauzière
- (Costa Rica) Keylor Herrera
- (Costa Rica) Benjamín Pineda
- (Mexico) Diego Montaño
- (Puerto Rico) José Torres
- (Saint Kitts and Nevis) Tristley Bassue
- (United States) Nima Saghafi
- (United States) Rubiel Vazquez

== Group stage ==
The match schedule was announced on May 13, 2021.

All match times listed are EDT (UTC−4), as listed by CONCACAF. If the venue was located in a different time zone, the local time is also given.

=== Tiebreakers ===
The ranking of teams in the group stage was determined as follows:

1. Points obtained in all group matches (three points for a win, one for a draw, none for a defeat);
2. Goal difference in all group matches;
3. Number of goals scored in all group matches;
4. Points obtained in the matches played between the teams in question;
5. Goal difference in the matches played between the teams in question;
6. Number of goals scored in the matches played between the teams in question;
7. Fair play points in all group matches (only one deduction could be applied to a player in a single match):
  - Yellow card: −1 points;
  - Indirect red card (second yellow card): −3 points;
  - Direct red card: −4 points;
  - Yellow card and direct red card: −5 points;
8. Drawing of lots.

=== Group A ===
| Pos | Team | Pld | W | D | L | GF | GA | GD | Pts | Qualification |
|---|---|---|---|---|---|---|---|---|---|---|
| 1 | Mexico | 3 | 2 | 1 | 0 | 4 | 0 | +4 | 7 | Advance to knockout stage |
| 2 | El Salvador | 3 | 2 | 0 | 1 | 4 | 1 | +3 | 6 | Advance to knockout stage |
| 3 | Trinidad and Tobago | 3 | 0 | 2 | 1 | 1 | 3 | −2 | 2 | |
| 4 | Guatemala | 3 | 0 | 1 | 2 | 1 | 6 | −5 | 1 | |

Source: CONCACAF
10 July 2021
22:30 (21:30 UTC−5)

| Mexico | 0–0 | Trinidad and Tobago |
|---|---|---|
| | Report |

AT&T Stadium, Arlington
Attendance: 41,229
Referee: Ricardo Montero (Costa Rica)
11 July 2021
23:00 (22:00 UTC−5)

| El Salvador | 2–0 | Guatemala |
|---|---|---|
| Roldán 81'; Rivas 90+6' | Report |

Toyota Stadium, Frisco
Attendance: 8,494
Referee: Jair Marrufo (United States)

14 July 2021
19:30 (18:30 UTC−5)

| Trinidad and Tobago | 0–2 | El Salvador |
|---|---|---|
| | Report | Henríquez 30'; Martínez 90+1' |

Toyota Stadium, Frisco
Attendance: 5,494
Referee: Selvin Brown (Honduras)
14 July 2021
22:30 (21:30 UTC−5) (Note: The Guatemala vs Mexico match, originally scheduled at 21:30 CDT (UTC−5), was delayed until 22:30 CDT due to torrential rain in the area.)

| Guatemala | 0–3 | Mexico |
|---|---|---|
| | Report | Funes Mori 29', 55'; Pineda 79' |

Cotton Bowl, Dallas
Attendance: 15,391
Referee: Daneon Parchment (Jamaica)

18 July 2021
22:00 (21:00 UTC−5)

| Mexico | 1–0 | El Salvador |
|---|---|---|
| L. Rodríguez 26' | Report |

Cotton Bowl, Dallas
Attendance: 45,792
Referee: Saíd Martínez (Honduras)
18 July 2021
22:00 (21:00 UTC−5)

| Guatemala | 1–1 | Trinidad and Tobago |
|---|---|---|
| Gordillo 78' | Report | Moore 12' |

Toyota Stadium, Frisco
Attendance: 5,476
Referee: Oshane Nation (Jamaica)

=== Group B ===
| Pos | Team | Pld | W | D | L | GF | GA | GD | Pts | Qualification |
|---|---|---|---|---|---|---|---|---|---|---|
| 1 | United States (H) | 3 | 3 | 0 | 0 | 8 | 1 | +7 | 9 | Advance to knockout stage |
| 2 | Canada | 3 | 2 | 0 | 1 | 8 | 3 | +5 | 6 | Advance to knockout stage |
| 3 | Haiti | 3 | 1 | 0 | 2 | 3 | 6 | −3 | 3 | |
| 4 | Martinique | 3 | 0 | 0 | 3 | 3 | 12 | −9 | 0 | |

Source: CONCACAF
(H) Hosts
11 July 2021
18:30 (17:30 UTC−5)

| Canada | 4–1 | Martinique |
|---|---|---|
| Larin 16'; Osorio 20'; Eustáquio 26'; Corbeanu 89' | Report | Rivière 10' |

Children's Mercy Park, Kansas City
Attendance: 12,664
Referee: Iván Barton (El Salvador)
11 July 2021
21:00 (20:00 UTC−5)

| United States | 1–0 | Haiti |
|---|---|---|
| Vines 8' | Report |

Children's Mercy Park, Kansas City
Attendance: 12,664
Referee: Saíd Martínez (Honduras)

15 July 2021
19:30 (18:30 UTC−5)

| Haiti | 1–4 | Canada |
|---|---|---|
| Lambese 56' | Report | Eustáquio 5'; Larin 51', 74' (pen.); Hoilett 79' (pen.) |

Children's Mercy Park, Kansas City
Attendance: 7,511
Referee: Juan Gabriel Calderón (Costa Rica)
15 July 2021
22:00 (21:00 UTC−5)

| Martinique | 1–6 | United States |
|---|---|---|
| Rivière 64' (pen.) | Report | Dike 14', 59'; Camille 23' (o.g.); Robinson 50'; Zardes 70'; Gioacchini 90' |

Children's Mercy Park, Kansas City
Attendance: 7,511
Referee: Mario Escobar (Guatemala)

18 July 2021
17:00 (16:00 UTC−5)

| Martinique | 1–2 | Haiti |
|---|---|---|
| Fortuné 53' | Report | Antoine 3'; Adé 61' |

Toyota Stadium, Frisco
Attendance: 243
Referee: Ismael Cornejo (El Salvador)
18 July 2021
17:00 (16:00 UTC−5)

| United States | 1–0 | Canada |
|---|---|---|
| Moore 1' | Report |

Children's Mercy Park, Kansas City
Attendance: 18,467
Referee: Adonai Escobedo (Mexico)

=== Group C ===
| Pos | Team | Pld | W | D | L | GF | GA | GD | Pts | Qualification |
|---|---|---|---|---|---|---|---|---|---|---|
| 1 | Costa Rica | 3 | 3 | 0 | 0 | 6 | 2 | +4 | 9 | Advance to knockout stage |
| 2 | Jamaica | 3 | 2 | 0 | 1 | 4 | 2 | +2 | 6 | Advance to knockout stage |
| 3 | Suriname | 3 | 1 | 0 | 2 | 3 | 5 | −2 | 3 | |
| 4 | Guadeloupe | 3 | 0 | 0 | 3 | 3 | 7 | −4 | 0 | |

Source: CONCACAF
12 July 2021
18:30

| Jamaica | 2–0 | Suriname |
|---|---|---|
| Nicholson 6'; De Cordova-Reid 26' | Report |

Exploria Stadium, Orlando
Attendance: 6,403
Referee: Bakary Gassama (Gambia)
12 July 2021
21:00

| Costa Rica | 3–1 | Guadeloupe |
|---|---|---|
| Campbell 6'; Lassiter 21'; Borges 70' | Report | Mirval 45+5' |

Exploria Stadium, Orlando
Attendance: 6,403
Referee: Ismail Elfath (United States)

16 July 2021
18:30

| Guadeloupe | 1–2 | Jamaica |
|---|---|---|
| Ramothe 4' | Report | Burke 14'; Flemmings 87' |

Exploria Stadium, Orlando
Attendance: 6,527
Referee: Bryan López (Guatemala)
16 July 2021
21:00

| Suriname | 1–2 | Costa Rica |
|---|---|---|
| Vlijter 52' | Report | Campbell 58'; Borges 59' |

Exploria Stadium, Orlando
Attendance: 6,527
Referee: Fernando Hernández (Mexico)

20 July 2021
19:00 (Note: The Costa Rica vs Jamaica match was stopped after two minutes of play due to thunderstorms in the area. The match was resumed at 21:20 EDT (UTC−4).)

| Costa Rica | 1–0 | Jamaica |
|---|---|---|
| Ruiz 53' | Report |

Exploria Stadium, Orlando
Attendance: 10,264
Referee: Mario Escobar (Guatemala)
20 July 2021
19:00 (18:00 UTC−5)

| Suriname | 2–1 | Guadeloupe |
|---|---|---|
| Vlijter 14'; Hasselbaink 79' | Report | Phaëton 20' |

BBVA Stadium, Houston
Attendance: 10,625
Referee: Fernando Guerrero (Mexico)

=== Group D ===
| Pos | Team | Pld | W | D | L | GF | GA | GD | Pts | Qualification |
|---|---|---|---|---|---|---|---|---|---|---|
| 1 | Qatar | 3 | 2 | 1 | 0 | 9 | 3 | +6 | 7 | Advance to knockout stage |
| 2 | Honduras | 3 | 2 | 0 | 1 | 7 | 4 | +3 | 6 | Advance to knockout stage |
| 3 | Panama | 3 | 1 | 1 | 1 | 8 | 7 | +1 | 4 | |
| 4 | Grenada | 3 | 0 | 0 | 3 | 1 | 11 | −10 | 0 | |

Source: CONCACAF
13 July 2021
20:50 (19:50 UTC−5) (Note: The Qatar vs Panama match, originally scheduled at 19:00 EDT (UTC−4), was delayed until 20:50 EDT due to thunderstorms in the area.)

| Qatar | 3–3 | Panama |
|---|---|---|
| Afif 48'; Ali 53'; Al-Haydos 63' (pen.) | Report | Blackburn 51', 58'; Davis 79' (pen.) |

BBVA Stadium, Houston
Attendance: 10,625
Referee: César Ramos (Mexico)
13 July 2021
23:10 (22:10 UTC−5) (Note: The Honduras vs Grenada match, originally scheduled at 21:00 EDT (UTC−4), was delayed until 23:10 EDT due to the weather delay in the first match between Qatar and Panama.)

| Honduras | 4–0 | Grenada |
|---|---|---|
| Bengtson 28'; Solano 52'; Leverón 86'; Quioto 88' | Report |

BBVA Stadium, Houston
Attendance: 10,625
Referee: Fernando Guerrero (Mexico)

17 July 2021
19:30 (18:30 UTC−5)

| Grenada | 0–4 | Qatar |
|---|---|---|
| | Report | Hatem 11'; Afif 22'; Muntari 36'; Ali 46' |

BBVA Stadium, Houston
Attendance: 7,173
Referee: Armando Villarreal (United States)
17 July 2021
21:30 (20:30 UTC−5)

| Panama | 2–3 | Honduras |
|---|---|---|
| Davis 32' (pen.); Yanis 45+1' | Report | Quioto 22', 65'; A. López 61' |

BBVA Stadium, Houston
Attendance: 3,508
Referee: Bakary Gassama (Gambia)

20 July 2021
21:30 (20:30 UTC−5)

| Honduras | 0–2 | Qatar |
|---|---|---|
| | Report | Ahmed 25'; Hatem 90+5' |

BBVA Stadium, Houston
Attendance: 12,630
Referee: Jair Marrufo (United States)
20 July 2021
23:30 (Note: The Panama vs Grenada match, originally scheduled at 21:30 EDT (UTC−4), was delayed until 23:30 EDT due to the weather delay in the Group C match between Costa Rica and Jamaica.)

| Panama | 3–1 | Grenada |
|---|---|---|
| Quintero 7'; Rodríguez 27', 64' | Report | Frank 76' |

Exploria Stadium, Orlando
Attendance: 1,548
Referee: César Ramos (Mexico)

== Knockout stage ==
In the knockout stage, if a match was level at the end of normal playing time, extra time was played (two periods of 15 minutes each), with each team being allowed to make a sixth substitution. If still tied after extra time, the match was decided by a penalty shoot-out.

As with every tournament since 2005 (except 2015), there was no third place play-off.

All match times listed are EDT (UTC−4), as listed by CONCACAF. If the venue was located in a different time zone, the local time is also given.

=== Bracket ===
Quarter-finals
24 July – Glendale
Qatar | 3
El Salvador | 2
25 July – Arlington
United States | 1
Jamaica | 0
24 July – Glendale
Mexico | 3
Honduras | 0
25 July – Arlington
Costa Rica | 0
Canada | 2

Semi-finals
29 July – Austin
Qatar | 0
United States | 1
29 July – Houston (NRG)
Mexico | 2
Canada | 1

Final
1 August – Paradise
United States (a.e.t.) | 1
Mexico | 0

=== Quarter-finals ===
24 July 2021
19:30 (16:30 UTC−7)

| Qatar | 3–2 | El Salvador |
|---|---|---|
| Ali 2', 55' (pen.); Hatem 8' | Report | Rivas 63', 66' |

State Farm Stadium, Glendale
Attendance: 64,211
Referee: Fernando Hernández (Mexico)

24 July 2021
22:30 (19:30 UTC−7)

| Mexico | 3–0 | Honduras |
|---|---|---|
| Funes Mori 26'; Dos Santos 31'; Pineda 38' | Report |

State Farm Stadium, Glendale
Attendance: 64,211
Referee: Mario Escobar (Guatemala)

25 July 2021
19:00 (18:00 UTC−5)

| Costa Rica | 0–2 | Canada |
|---|---|---|
| | Report | Hoilett 18'; Eustáquio 69' |

AT&T Stadium, Arlington
Attendance: 41,318
Referee: Jair Marrufo (United States)

25 July 2021
21:30 (20:30 UTC−5)

| United States | 1–0 | Jamaica |
|---|---|---|
| Hoppe 83' | Report |

AT&T Stadium, Arlington
Attendance: 41,318
Referee: César Ramos (Mexico)

=== Semi-finals ===
29 July 2021
19:30 (18:30 UTC−5)

| Qatar | 0–1 | United States |
|---|---|---|
| | Report | Zardes 86' |

Q2 Stadium, Austin
Attendance: 20,500
Referee: Juan Gabriel Calderón (Costa Rica)

29 July 2021
22:15 (21:15 UTC−5)

| Mexico | 2–1 | Canada |
|---|---|---|
| Pineda 45+2' (pen.); Herrera 90+9' | Report | Buchanan 57' |

NRG Stadium, Houston
Attendance: 70,304
Referee: Daneon Parchment (Jamaica)

=== Final ===
August 1, 2021
21:00 (18:00 UTC−7)

| United States | 1–0 (a.e.t.) | Mexico |
|---|---|---|
| Robinson 117' | Report |

Allegiant Stadium, Paradise
Attendance: 61,114
Referee: Saíd Martínez (Honduras)

== Statistics ==
=== Goalscorers ===
There were 89 goals scored in 31 matches, for an average of 2.87 goals per match.

4 goals

- (Qatar) Almoez Ali

3 goals

- (Canada) Stephen Eustáquio
- (Canada) Cyle Larin
- (El Salvador) Joaquín Rivas
- (Honduras) Romell Quioto
- (Mexico) Rogelio Funes Mori
- (Mexico) Orbelín Pineda
- (Qatar) Abdulaziz Hatem

2 goals

- (Canada) Junior Hoilett
- (Costa Rica) Celso Borges
- (Costa Rica) Joel Campbell
- (Martinique) Emmanuel Rivière
- (Panama) Rolando Blackburn
- (Panama) Eric Davis
- (Panama) José Luis Rodríguez
- (Qatar) Akram Afif
- (Suriname) Gleofilo Vlijter
- (United States) Daryl Dike
- (United States) Miles Robinson
- (United States) Gyasi Zardes

1 goal

- (Canada) Tajon Buchanan
- (Canada) Theo Corbeanu
- (Canada) Jonathan Osorio
- (Costa Rica) Ariel Lassiter
- (Costa Rica) Bryan Ruiz
- (El Salvador) Jairo Henríquez
- (El Salvador) Walmer Martinez
- (El Salvador) Alex Roldan
- (Grenada) Romar Frank
- (Guadeloupe) Raphaël Mirval
- (Guadeloupe) Matthias Phaëton
- (Guadeloupe) Dimitri Ramothe
- (Guatemala) Gerardo Gordillo
- (Haiti) Ricardo Adé
- (Haiti) Carnejy Antoine
- (Haiti) Stéphane Lambese
- (Honduras) Jerry Bengtson
- (Honduras) Johnny Leverón
- (Honduras) Alexander López
- (Honduras) Edwin Solano
- (Jamaica) Cory Burke
- (Jamaica) Bobby De Cordova-Reid
- (Jamaica) Junior Flemmings
- (Jamaica) Shamar Nicholson
- (Martinique) Kévin Fortuné
- (Mexico) Jonathan dos Santos
- (Mexico) Héctor Herrera
- (Mexico) Luis Rodríguez
- (Panama) Alberto Quintero
- (Panama) César Yanis
- (Qatar) Homam Ahmed
- (Qatar) Hassan Al-Haydos
- (Qatar) Mohammed Muntari
- (Suriname) Nigel Hasselbaink
- (Trinidad and Tobago) Reon Moore
- (United States) Nicholas Gioacchini
- (United States) Matthew Hoppe
- (United States) Shaq Moore
- (United States) Sam Vines

1 own goal

- (Jamaica) Amari'i Bell (against Guadeloupe)
- (Martinique) Samuel Camille (against United States)

Source: CONCACAF

=== Awards ===
The following awards were given at the conclusion of the tournament.

- Golden Ball Award: (Mexico) Héctor Herrera
- Golden Boot Award: (Qatar) Almoez Ali
- Golden Glove Award: (United States) Matt Turner
- Young Player Award: (Canada) Tajon Buchanan
- Goal of the Tournament: (Jamaica) Bobby De Cordova-Reid (against Suriname)
- Fighting Spirit Award: (El Salvador) Bryan Tamacas
- Fair Play Award: United States

Best XI

The following players were chosen as the tournament's best eleven.

| Goalkeeper | Defenders | Midfielders | Forwards |
|---|---|---|---|
| (United States) Matt Turner | (United States) Miles Robinson (Mexico) Edson Álvarez (United States) Shaq Moore (Jamaica) Damion Lowe | (Mexico) Héctor Herrera (Costa Rica) Celso Borges (Canada) Tajon Buchanan | (Qatar) Akram Afif (Mexico) Rogelio Funes Mori (Qatar) Almoez Ali |

=== Prize money ===
Each team received a participation fee of $200,000, with the runners-up earning $500,000 and the winners earning $1 million.

| Round achieved | Amount | Teams |
|---|---|---|
| Final tournament | $200,000 | 16 |
| Runners-up | $500,000 | 1 |
| Winners | $1,000,000 | 1 |

== Marketing ==
=== Logo and slogan ===
The official logo was unveiled on September 28, 2020, during the final draw in Miami, Florida. The official slogan of the tournament was "This Is Ours".

=== Sponsors ===
- Allstate,
- Angry Orchard,
- Chick-Fil-A,
- Coca-Cola,
- Grubhub,
- Grupo Modelo,
- Guaranteed Rate,
- MGM Resorts,
- Nike,
- O'Reilly Auto Parts,
- Powerade,
- Scotiabank,
- Qatar Airways,
- Toyota,
- Walgreens,
- Valvoline,
- Visit Las Vegas

=== Match ball ===
Flight by Nike was the tournament's official match ball.

=== Official songs and anthems ===
"All Things (Just Keep Getting Better)" by Canadian musicians Widelife and Simone Denny, and "Cool" by Irish singer-songwriter Samantha Mumba, served as the two official songs of the tournament. Mumba's first singles "Baby Come on Over" and "Gotta Tell You" were initially selected but were replaced as Mumba's previous label Polydor rejected the usage.

"Glorious" by English-Canadian girl group All Saints served as the official anthem of the tournament.

"Fútbol a la Gente" by Puerto Rican singer Guaynaa and Mexican cumbia group Los Ángeles Azules, and "Pa'lante" by Colombian singer Lao Ra and Dominican DJ Happy Colors, served as the two official Spanish-language songs of the tournament, the former being selected by Univision as part of their coverage.

"Juega" was the official Spanish anthem, by Colombian duo Cali y El Dandee featuring Jamaican singer Charly Black.

== Controversy ==
At the 88th minute of the semifinal match between Mexico and Canada, the referee briefly suspended the match because the Mexican fans had been heard yelling the homophonic chant "Puto". Mexico was able to catch a crucial break and ended up scoring the match winning goal at the 99th minute.
