= Jiovany Ramos =

Panamanian footballer (born 1997)

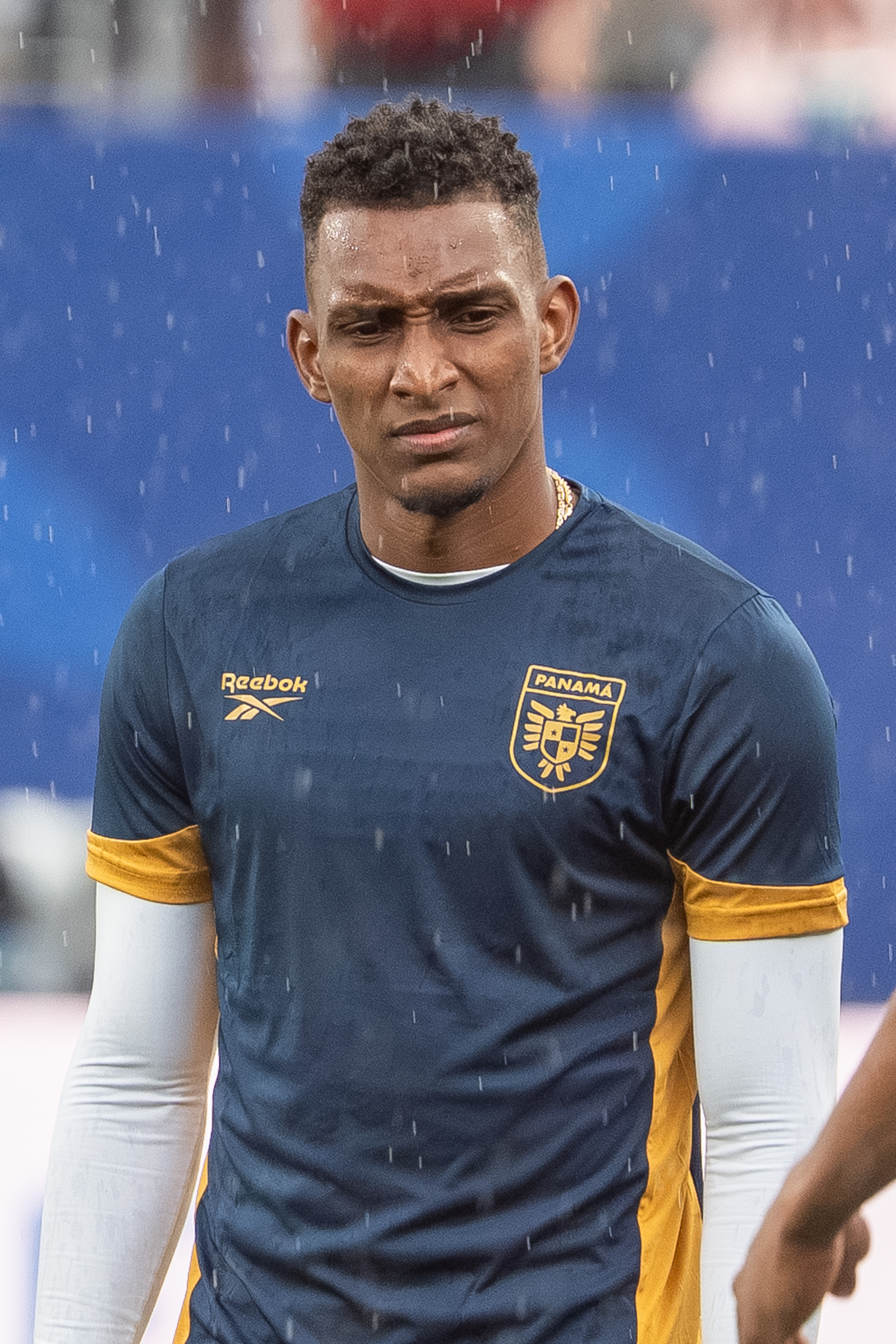
- Ramos with Panama in 2026

Personal information
- Full name: Jiovany Javier Ramos Díaz
- Date of birth: 26 January 1997 (age 29)
- Place of birth: Panama City, Panama
- Height: 1.80 m (5 ft 11 in)
- Position: Centre-back

Team information
- Current team: Puerto Cabello (on loan from CAI)
- Number: 26

Senior career*
Years	Team	Apps	(Gls)
2016–2020	San Francisco	96	(2)
2020–	CAI	11	(1)
2021	→ Atlético Venezuela (loan)	31	(1)
2022	→ Deportivo La Guaira (loan)	30	(1)
2023	→ Deportivo Táchira (loan)	32	(2)
2024	→ Alianza Lima (loan)	18	(1)
2025–	Puerto Cabello	36	(2)

International career^{‡}
2017	Panama U20	4	(0)
2020–	Panama	26	(2)
- * Club domestic league appearances and goals as of 21:28, 19 September 2026 (UTC) ‡ National team caps and goals as of 17:10, 1 October 2026 (UTC)

Jiovany Javier Ramos Díaz (born 26 January 1997) is a Panamanian footballer who plays as a centre-back for Venezuelan Primera División side Puerto Cabello, on loan from CAI, and the Panama national team.

== International career ==
Ramos made his debut for the Panama national team in a 0–0 friendly tie with Nicaragua on 26 February 2020.

== Career statistics ==
As of match played 1 October 2026

Appearances and goals by national team and year
National team	Year	Apps	Goals
Panama	2020	4	0
Panama	2021	1	0
Panama	2022	5	0
Panama	2023	3	0
Panama	2024	3	0
Panama	2025	3	0
Panama	2026	7	2
Total		26	2

Scores and results list Templatonia's goal tally first, score column indicates score after each Ramos goal.

List of international goals scored by Jiovany Ramos
No.	Date	Venue	Opponent	Score	Result	Competition
1	31 March 2026	Cape Town Stadium, Cape Town, South Africa	South Africa	2–1	2–1	Friendly
2	6 June 2026	Energizer Park, St. Louis, United States	Bosnia and Herzegovina	1–1	1–1	Friendly

== Honours ==
Panama

- CONCACAF Nations League runner-up: 2024–25
