= Jacob Berkeley-Agyepong =

Grenadian association football player

Personal information
- Full name: Jacob Kwame Berkeley-Agyepong
- Date of birth: 29 March 1997 (age 29)
- Place of birth: Croydon, England
- Height: 1.80 m (5 ft 11 in)
- Position: Attacking midfielder

Youth career
- 2005–2018: Crystal Palace

Senior career*
| Years | Team | Apps | (Gls) |
| 2018–2020 | Aldershot Town | 48 | (5) |
| 2019–2020 | → Dartford (loan) | 6 | (2) |
| 2020–2021 | Dartford | 17 | (5) |
| 2021–2022 | Aldershot Town | 34 | (2) |
| 2022–2023 | Gloucester City | 21 | (0) |
| 2023 | Havant & Waterlooville | 11 | (0) |
| 2023–2024 | Maidstone United | 12 | (1) |
| 2025 | Wealdstone | 0 | (0) |
| 2025–2026 | Maidstone United | 10 | (1) |

International career^{‡}
| 2021– | Grenada | 16 | (1) |
- * Club domestic league appearances and goals as of 1 May 2026 ‡ National team caps and goals as of 10 September 2024

Jacob Kwame Berkeley-Agyepong (born 29 July 1997) is a footballer who plays as an attacking midfielder. Born in England, he plays for the Grenada national team.

== Club career ==
Berkeley-Agyepong joined youth academy of Crystal Palace at the age of eight. He was released by the club after the end of 2017–18 season. He joined Aldershot Town in 2018.

On 28 December 2019, Dartford announced the signing of Berkeley-Agyepong on a short-term loan deal.

After a successful spell at Dartford, Berkeley-Agyepong rejoined Aldershot Town on 11 August 2021.

Berkeley-Agypong spent the 2022–23 season at Gloucester City.

On 26 September 2023, he signed for Havant & Waterlooville before moving to Maidstone United on 23 December 2023.

== International career ==
Born in England, Berkeley-Agyepong is of Grenadian and Ghanaian descent. On 1 July 2021, he was named in Grenada's 23-man squad for 2021 CONCACAF Gold Cup. He made his international debut on 13 July in a 4–0 group match defeat against Honduras.

== Career statistics ==
=== Club ===
As of match played 30 June 2023

Appearances and goals by club, season and competition
| Club | Season | League | | | FA Cup | | EFL Cup | | Other | | Total | |
| Club | Season | Division | Apps | Goals | Apps | Goals | Apps | Goals | Apps | Goals | Apps | Goals |
|---|---|---|---|---|---|---|---|---|---|---|---|---|
| Aldershot Town | 2018–19 | National League | 27 | 1 | 2 | 0 | — | | 0 | 0 | 29 | 1 |
| Aldershot Town | 2019–20 | National League | 21 | 4 | 1 | 0 | — | | 0 | 0 | 22 | 4 |
| Aldershot Town | Total | | 48 | 5 | 3 | 0 | — | | 0 | 0 | 51 | 5 |
| Dartford (loan) | 2019–20 | National League South | 6 | 2 | — | | — | | — | | 6 | 2 |
| Dartford | 2020–21 | National League South | 17 | 5 | 1 | 0 | — | | 2 (Note: Appearances in the FA Trophy) | 1 | 20 | 6 |
| Aldershot Town | 2021–22 | National League | 34 | 2 | 0 | 0 | — | | 2 | 1 | 36 | 3 |
| Gloucester City | 2022–23 | National League North | 21 | 0 | 0 | 0 | — | | 1 | 0 | 22 | 0 |
| Career total | | | 126 | 14 | 4 | 0 | 0 | 0 | 5 | 2 | 135 | 16 |

=== International ===
As of match played 9 September 2024

Appearances and goals by national team and year
| National team | Year | Apps | Goals |
|---|---|---|---|
| Grenada | 2021 | 3 | 0 |
| Grenada | 2022 | 5 | 1 |
| Grenada | 2023 | 6 | 0 |
| Grenada | 2024 | 2 | 0 |
| Total | | 16 | 1 |

Scores and results list Grenada's goal tally first, score column indicates score after each Berkeley-Agyepong goal.

List of international goals scored by Jacob Berkeley-Agyepong
| No. | Date | Venue | Opponent | Score | Result | Competition |
|---|---|---|---|---|---|---|
| 1 | 7 June 2022 | Kirani James Athletic Stadium, St. George's, Grenada | El Salvador | 1–0 | 2–2 | 2022–23 CONCACAF Nations League |
