= Michael Findlay (soccer) =

Canadian soccer coach

Personal information
- Full name: Michael George Findlay
- Date of birth: November 6, 1963 (age 63)
- Place of birth: Saint Boniface, Winnipeg, Canada

Team information
- Current team: Saint Vincent and the Grenadines (manager)

Managerial career
- Years: Team
- 2008–2009: Canada U17 (assistant)
- 2010–2011: Canada U20 (assistant)
- 2013–2016: Canada (assistant)
- 2015: Canada U23 (assistant)
- 2016–2017: Canada (interim)
- 2021–2022: Grenada
- 2023–2026: Bermuda
- 2026–: Saint Vincent and the Grenadines

Michael George Findlay (born November 6, 1963) is a Canadian soccer coach and current manager of the Vincentian national team.

== Career ==
Findlay arrived in Scotland as a 16 year-old following being identified in the 1981 NASL High School Draft and spent three years there trying to win professional deals with Celtic, the club he grew up supporting, and Partick Thistle but was ultimately unsuccessful. While he resided in Scotland, he lived with David Moyes and his family in Bearsden, who played for Celtic at the time.

Findlay returned to North America where he spent trial periods with the Montreal Manic of the NASL and had stints with Canadian based CPSL teams.

Following his unsuccessful attempt at a long term professional soccer career Findlay entered the business world where he worked in sales, finance, real estate development and the sports marketing industry with API International and the BC Sports Hall of Fame as executive director. Michael returned to his roots and passion when he joined the NSSDC as an assistant coach for the BC (Canadian) based regional soccer centre. This was followed by his appointment as a staff coach at the British Columbia Soccer Association which was closely followed by his promotion to Director of Football Development for BC Soccer at which time he was responsible for all soccer development matters within the region while also being a member of Canada Soccer's Technical Committee.

During his tenure as Director of Football Development Findlay was key contributor and implementer of Canada Soccer's Long Term Player Development initiative and was responsible for the establishment of Canada's 1st high performance / standard based youth development league in BC known as the BCSPL.

As Director of Football Development Findlay became involved with the Canadian men's national soccer program in 2004, when he served as a coach under Stephen Hart at an U17 national team camp in Burnaby. For the next four years, Findlay served as a coach at camps at every level of Canadian men's program, from the U15 team to senior team.

He served as an assistant coach in an official FIFA event for the first time in 2009, when he worked under Sean Fleming at the 2009 CONCACAF U-17 Championship. He subsequently served as an assistant under Valério Gazzola at the 2011 CONCACAF U-20 Championship and Phillip Dos Santos at the 2013 Jeux de la Francophonie.

In November 2013, he joined newly-appointed Canadian senior team head coach Benito Floro's staff as an assistant. In this capacity, he helped manage the team at the 2015 Gold Cup and in its 2018 World Cup qualification campaign. In 2015, he also served as an assistant for the Canadian U23 team in its 2016 Olympic qualifying campaign, before serving as head coach of that program the following year for a friendly tour in the Caribbean.

In September 2016, he was announced as interim head coach of the Canada national team. Across six international matches as Head Coach (including an October 2015 friendly), he posted two wins, two draws and two losses.

On January 21, 2021, Findlay was named head coach of the Grenadian senior men's national team by the Grenada FA.

On August 11, 2023, Findlay was appointed head coach of the Bermuda men's national team.

== Coaching statistics ==
As of match played 25 March 2026

Coaching record by club and tenure
| Team | From | To | Record | | | | | | | |
| Team | From | To | M | W | D | L | GF | GA | GD | Win % |
|---|---|---|---|---|---|---|---|---|---|---|
| Canada | September 2016 | July 2017 | 6 | 2 | 2 | 2 | 10 | 10 | +0 | 33.33 |
| Grenada | January 2021 | June 2022 | 12 | 1 | 2 | 9 | 6 | 27 | −21 | 8.33 |
| Bermuda | August 2023 | March 2026 | 26 | 7 | 5 | 14 | 33 | 64 | −31 | 26.92 |
| Total | | | 44 | 10 | 9 | 25 | 49 | 101 | −52 | 22.73 |
