= Panama national football team =

Men's association football team

Panama
- Nickname(s): Los Canaleros (The Canal Men); La Marea Roja (The Red Tide)
- Association: Federación Panameña de Fútbol (FEPAFUT)
- Confederation: CONCACAF (North America)
- Sub-confederation: UNCAF (Central America)
- Head coach: Thomas Christiansen
- Captain: Yoel Bárcenas
- Most caps: Aníbal Godoy (160)
- Top scorer: Luis Tejada (43)
- Home stadium: Estadio Rommel Fernández Gutiérrez
- FIFA code: PAN
First colours	Second colours	Third colours

FIFA ranking
- Current: 45 ▲1 (18 November 2026)
- Highest: 29 (March 2014, September 2025 – July 2026)
- Lowest: 150 (August 1995)

First international
- Panama 2–1 Venezuela (Panama City, Panama; 12 February 1938)

Biggest win
- Anguilla 0–13 Panama (Panama City, Panama; 5 June 2021)

Biggest defeat
- Panama 0–11 Costa Rica (Panama City, Panama; 16 February 1938)

World Cup
- Appearances: 2 (first in 2018)
- Best result: Group stage (2018, 2026)

CONCACAF Championship / Gold Cup
- Appearances: 14 (first in 1963)
- Best result: Runners-up (2005, 2013, 2023)

CONCACAF Nations League
- Appearances: 4 (first in 2019–20)
- Best result: Runners-up (2025)

Copa América
- Appearances: 2 (first in 2016)
- Best result: Quarter-finals (2024)

CCCF Championship
- Appearances: 7 (first in 1941)
- Best result: Champions (1951)
Medal record
CONCACAF Gold Cup
Silver medal – second place	2005 United States	Team
Silver medal – second place	2013 United States	Team
Silver medal – second place	2023 United States and Canada	Team
Bronze medal – third place	2015 United States and Canada	Team
CONCACAF Nations League
Silver medal – second place	2025 United States	Team
CCCF Championship
Gold medal – first place	1951 Panama	Team
Bronze medal – third place	1948 Guatemala	Team
Copa Centroamericana
Gold medal – first place	2009 Honduras	Team
Silver medal – second place	2007 El Salvador	Team
Silver medal – second place	2017 Panama	Team
Bronze medal – third place	1993 Honduras	Team
Bronze medal – third place	2011 Panama	Team
Bronze medal – third place	2014 United States	Team
Central American and Caribbean Games
Bronze medal – third place	1946 Colombia	Team

The Panama national football team (Spanish: Selección de fútbol de Panamá) represents Panama in men's international football, and is governed by the Panamanian Football Federation (Spanish: Federación Panameña de Fútbol), the governing body for football in Panama founded in 1937. It has been a full member of FIFA since 1938, is a founding member of CONCACAF which was founded in 1961, and is also a member of UNCAF in the Central American Zone. From 1938 to 1961, the team was a member of CCCF, the former governing body of football in Central America and Caribbean and a predecessor confederation of CONCACAF. Panama was also a member of PFC, the former unified confederation of the Americas.

Panama has qualified for the FIFA World Cup twice (2018 and 2026), they scored their first goal against England. Panama has participated thirteen times in CONCACAF's premier continental competition, the team's best performance was finishing as runners-up three times in the CONCACAF Gold Cup (2005, 2013 and 2023), and also finishing as runners-up in the CONCACAF Nations League in the 2025 finals. The team participated twice in the Copa América (2016 and 2024).

In subcontinental competitions, the team won the CCCF Championship as hosts in 1951, the Copa Centroamericana in 2009, and the silver medal at the Central American and Caribbean Games in 1946.

== History ==
=== 2011 Gold Cup ===
In the 2011 Gold Cup, Panama was placed into Group C with Canada, United States, and Guadeloupe. They debuted with a 3–2 win over Guadeloupe. In the next match, they beat the United States 2–1. Then they tied 1–1 against Canada, winning their group for the first time in the Gold Cup. They played against El Salvador in the quarter-finals, beating them 5–3 on penalties. They played against the United States again, this time in the semi-finals, although they lost 1–0.

=== 2013 Gold Cup ===
In the 2013 Gold Cup, Panama began with a 2–1 win over Mexico, with Gabriel Torres scoring both goals. In the second match, Panama beat Martinique 1–0 with Gabriel Torres scoring the only goal. With two victories, they secured their qualification to the knockout stages. Already being qualified, they tied 0–0 against Canada securing the first place in their group. They easily beat Cuba 6-1 and qualified for the semi-finals with Blas Pérez and Gabriel Torres scoring two goals each. They faced Mexico again in the semifinals and beat them 2–1 to advance to the final for the second time in the competition against the United States, which was their opponent in the 2005 final and beat them on penalties. The Panamanians could not get their revenge on them and lost 0–1 with a goal from Brek Shea.

=== 2014 World Cup qualifying ===
Panama came close to advancing out of the fourth round of qualifiers for the 2014 World Cup. In their last match, which was against the United States, they led 2–1 after 90 minutes and were assured to advance to a play-off against New Zealand, but conceded two goals in stoppage time and were eliminated, with Mexico taking the playoff slot instead.

=== 2015 Gold Cup ===
In the 2015 Gold Cup, Panama was drawn into Group A, along with the United States, Haiti, and Honduras. All of their games were a 1–1 draws. However this was enough to advance to the knockout stage as the best ranked third place. In the quarter-finals, they played against Trinidad and Tobago, drawing 1–1 after 90 minutes and defeating them 6–5 on penalties. They advanced to the semi-finals against Mexico; Roman Torres scored on behalf of Panama and Andres Guardado scored for Mexico. The first 90 minutes ended in a 1–1 draw; Panama was then defeated 2–1 in extra time after referee Mark Geiger gave Mexico a penalty, which Andres Guardado also scored. With this result, Panama earned the chance to play the third place playoff against the United States. The score was 1–1 after extra time and Panama won 3–2 on penalties, giving them third place. Mexico ended up defeating Jamaica in the final to crown themselves champions.

=== 2018 World Cup qualifying ===
Four years after failing to qualify for the 2014 World Cup, Los Canaleros finally qualified for the World Cup after defeating Costa Rica 2−1 in their final qualifying match, which meant that the United States, who lost to Trinidad and Tobago 2–1, failed to qualify for the first time since 1986. Román Torres, who scored the winning goal in the 87th minute, was subsequently considered a national hero. The day after the match, the President of Panama Juan Carlos Varela declared a national holiday to commemorate the achievement, stating on his Twitter profile: "The voice of the people has been heard... Tomorrow will be a national holiday".

=== 2018 World Cup ===
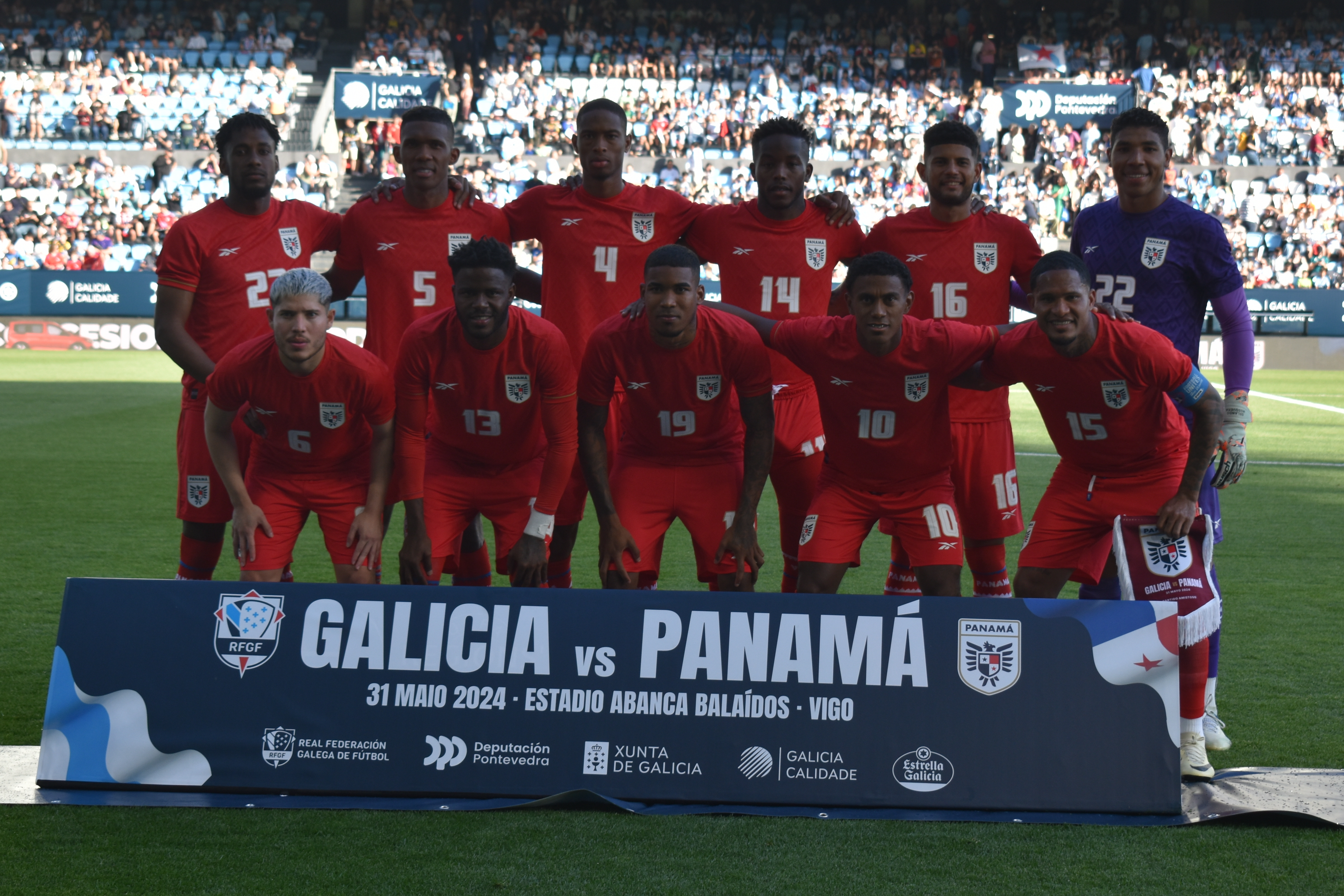
Panama national football team in 2024.

In the 2018 FIFA World Cup, Panama were drawn into Group G, together with European giants Belgium and England and the African side Tunisia. Their debut World Cup match was against Belgium, on 18 June 2018. Los Canaleros initially held on, with the score 0–0 at half-time, before eventually suffering a 3–0 loss. Six days later, Panama faced England, and this time succumbed to a 6–1 defeat; Felipe Baloy's late goal was the nation's first at a World Cup, but it was not enough to save them from elimination. A 2–1 loss to Tunisia in their final game meant that Panama finished bottom of their group – and 32nd and last in the tournament overall – having lost all three of their games and conceded eleven goals.

=== 2026 World Cup ===
In the 2026 FIFA World Cup, Panama were drawn into Group L with England, Croatia, and Ghana. In their opening match against Ghana, they lost 1–0 to a 95th minute winner from Caleb Yirenkyi, despite not allowing a shot until the 48th minute of the game when they had allowed an attempt within the first 10 minutes of each of their previous World Cup matches. In addition, Panama recorded 62% possession while completing 502 passes, both all time highs in the World Cup. They were the only team to fail to score a goal in the tournament.

== Team image ==
=== Kit sponsorship ===
Kit supplier	Period	Notes
(Belgium) Patrick	1992–1996	Patrick became the first official commercial sportswear sponsor, transitioning the team away from generic, unbranded teamwear. The team wore Patrick kits during the 1994 FIFA World Cup qualifiers.
(United States) Reebok	1996–1999	Panama wore Reebok kits during the 1998 FIFA World Cup qualifiers.
(Italy) Kappa	1999–2002	Panama wore Kappa kits during the 1998 FIFA World Cup qualifiers.
(Italy) Lotto	2002–2014	Panama wore Lotto kits for 12 years, the longest time a brand has sponsored Panama in the team's history. Some notable kits from this era: 2006 FIFA World Cup qualifiers, 2011 CONCACAF Gold Cup and 2013 CONCACAF Gold Cup.
(United States) New Balance	2015–2023	Panama wore New Balance kits for the first time on a tied 1-1 friendly match against Ecuador in 2015. Most notably, the team wore their debut kits at the 2018 FIFA World Cup.
(United States) Reebok	2023–2027	Panama returned to wearing Reebok kits after 24 years. Three different kits were worn during the 2026 FIFA World Cup.

=== Home stadium ===
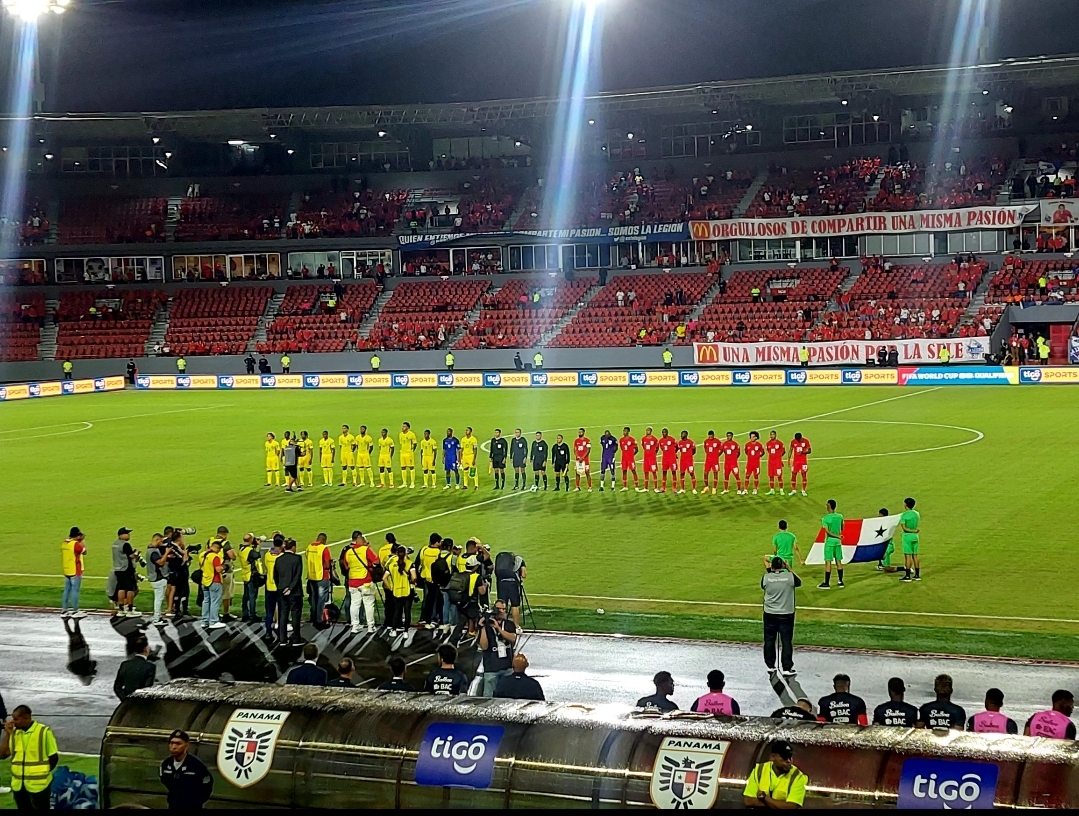
2026 FIFA World Cup qualification match between Panama and Guyana at the Rommel Fernández Stadium.

Historically, the Rommel Fernández Stadium has served as the primary home venue of the Panama national football team and has hosted the vast majority of the country's FIFA World Cup qualifiers, international friendlies, and official tournament matches since its inauguration in 1970. Located in Panama City, the stadium is widely regarded as the spiritual home of Panamanian football and has witnessed many of the nation's most significant sporting achievements.

Throughout its history, however, the stadium has periodically undergone maintenance, modernization, and expansion projects that temporarily rendered it unavailable for international competition. During these periods, the Panama national team was required to relocate its home fixtures to alternative venues across the country.

The most notable of these relocations occurred in 2008, when the stadium underwent a major renovation and expansion project that increased its seating capacity and modernized several of its facilities, part of it attributed Irving Saladino's performance at the 2008 Summer Olympics. As a result, Panama's home matches were temporarily moved to the Rod Carew Stadium. Originally designed as a baseball venue, Rod Carew Stadium was reconfigured to accommodate football matches by adapting its field dimensions to meet FIFA requirements.

A similar situation occurred in 2021, when the Rommel Fernández Stadium underwent extensive turf replacement and pitch improvement works in preparation for the final round of the CONCACAF qualification process for the 2022 FIFA World Cup, commonly known as the Octagonal. During the renovation period, the Panama national team once again utilized the Rod Carew Stadium as its temporary home ground. The venue successfully hosted FIFA-sanctioned matches after undergoing the necessary modifications.

==== Home matches hosted at other venues in the 21st century ====
It is a rare occurrence for Panama to be the home team other than at the Rommel Fernández Stadium (which is the 2nd largest venue in the country). Panama has a positive record on all home matches that have been played outside of it.

15 June 2008 2010 World Cup qualification	Panama	1–0	El Salvador	Panama City, Panama
16:00 UTC−4	Tejada 21'	Report		Stadium: Estadio Nacional de Panamá, Panama City; Attendance: 22,150; Referee: Enrico Wijngaarde (Suriname)

8 June 2021 2022 World Cup qualification	Panama	3–0	Dominican Republic	Panama City, Panama
20:00 UTC−5	Godoy 8'; Bárcenas 67'; Waterman 86'	Report		Stadium: Estadio Nacional Rod Carew, Panama City; Attendance: 5,674; Referee: Walter López (Guatemala)

12 June 2021 2022 World Cup qualification	Panama	2–1	Curaçao	Panama City, Panama
18:15 UTC−5	Quintero 55'; Waterman 77'	Report	Janga 87'	Stadium: Estadio Nacional Rod Carew, Panama City; Attendance: 7,000; Referee: Jaime Herrera Bonilla (El Salvador)

10 June 2023 Friendly	Panama	3–2	Nicaragua	Penonomé, Panama
19:00 UTC−5	M. Murillo 55', 81'; Miller 84'	Report	Talavera 44'; Acevedo 62'	Stadium: Estadio Universidad Latina; Referee: David Gómez (Costa Rica)

=== Media Coverage ===
For the 2026 FIFA World Cup, Panama's matches are broadcast on RPC, Tigo Sports and TVMAX. Tigo Sports is the only sports network that will provide full coverage of all 104 matches in the country..

== Results and fixtures ==
The following is a list of match results in the last 12 months, as well as any future matches that have been scheduled.

Win Draw Loss Fixture

=== 2025 ===
18 November 2026 World Cup qualification	Panama	3–0	El Salvador	Panama City, Panama
20:00 UTC−5	Blackman 17'; Davis 45+4' (pen.); Rodríguez 85'	Report		Stadium: Estadio Rommel Fernández; Attendance: 21,255; Referee: Saíd Martínez (Honduras)

=== 2026 ===
18 January Friendly	Bolivia	1–1	Panama	Tarija, Bolivia
17:00 UTC−4	Roberts 69' (o.g.)	Report	Barría 5'	Stadium: Estadio IV Centenario; Attendance: 12,000; Referee: Bruno Arleu de Araújo (Brazil)

22 January Friendly	Panama	0–1	Mexico	Panama City, Panama
20:00 UTC−5		Report	Peralta 90+3' (o.g.)	Stadium: Estadio Rommel Fernández; Attendance: 16,447; Referee: Guido Gonzales Jr. (United States)

27 March Friendly	South Africa	1–1	Panama	Durban, South Africa
19:00 UTC+2	Appollis 48'	Report	Bárcenas 23'	Stadium: Moses Mabhida Stadium; Attendance: 14,000; Referee: Thabang Ketshabile (Botswana)

31 March Friendly	South Africa	1–2	Panama	Cape Town, South Africa
19:30 UTC+2	Mbokazi 64'	Report	Córdoba 58'; Ramos 77'	Stadium: Cape Town Stadium; Attendance: 55,000; Referee: Thabang Ketshabile (Botswana)

31 May Friendly	Brazil	6–2	Panama	Rio de Janeiro, Brazil
18:30 UTC−4	Vinicius Jr. 2'; Casemiro 39'; Rayan 53'; Paquetá 60'; Thiago 63' (pen.); Danilo 81'	Report	Cunha 14' (o.g.); Harvey 83'	Stadium: Maracanã; Attendance: 72,140; Referee: Daniel Schlager (Germany)

3 June Friendly	Panama	4–2	Dominican Republic	Panama City, Panama
19:45 UTC−5	Rodríguez 16'; Griffith 44'; Waterman 57'; Barría 89'	Report	Díaz 47'; Japa 67'	Stadium: Estadio Rommel Fernández; Attendance: 22,000; Referee: Nelson Salgado (Honduras)

6 June Friendly	Bosnia and Herzegovina	1–1	Panama	St. Louis, United States
14:00 UTC−5	Katić 24'	Report	Ramos 45+2'	Stadium: Energizer Park; Attendance: 20,000; Referee: Luis Enrique Santander (Mexico)

17 June 2026 World Cup GS	Ghana	1–0	Panama	Toronto, Canada
19:00 UTC−4	Yirenkyi 90+5'	Report		Stadium: BMO Field; Attendance: 42,942; Referee: Glenn Nyberg (Sweden)

23 June 2026 World Cup GS	Panama	0–1	Croatia	Toronto, Canada
19:00 UTC−4		Report	Budimir 54'	Stadium: BMO Field; Attendance: 43,036; Referee: Pierre Atcho (Gabon)

27 June 2026 World Cup GS	Panama	0–2	England	East Rutherford, United States
17:00 UTC−4		Report	Bellingham 62'; Kane 67'	Stadium: MetLife Stadium; Attendance: 80,663; Referee: Abdulrahman Al-Jassim (Qatar)

25 September Friendly	India	1–1	Panama	Bengaluru, India
19:00 UTC+5:30	Williams 41'	Report	O. Valencia 68'	Stadium: Sree Kanteerava Stadium; Attendance: 9,039; Referee: Nazmi Nasaruddin (Malaysia)

1 October 2026 Kirin Cup Soccer	Panama	1–1 (3–5 p)	New Zealand	Yokohama, Japan
15:10 UTC+9	Herbert 45+1'	Report	Stamenić 13'	Stadium: Nissan Stadium; Attendance: 8,513; Referee: Rubiel Vazquez (United States)
	Penalties
	A. Murillo (penalty scored); Harvey (penalty scored); Jiménez (penalty missed); Griffith (penalty scored)		(penalty scored) Bindon; (penalty scored) Stamenić; (penalty scored) Dyer; (penalty scored) Bayliss; (penalty scored) Boxall

5 October 2026 Kirin Cup Soccer	Ecuador	1–1 (6–7 p)	Panama	Tokyo, Japan
15:30 UTC+9	J. Angulo 58'	Report	Vergara 38'	Stadium: National Stadium; Attendance: 14,364; Referee: Kōki Nagamine (Japan)
	Penalties
	Vite (penalty scored); Valencia (penalty missed); Yeboah (penalty scored); N. Angulo (penalty scored); Arroyo (penalty scored); Pacho (penalty scored); F. Caicedo (penalty scored); J. Angulo (penalty missed)		(penalty scored) Murillo; (penalty scored) Harvey; (penalty missed) Griffith; (penalty scored) T. Rodríguez; (penalty scored) R. Mosquera; (penalty scored) Blackman; (penalty scored) Herbert; (penalty scored) D. Murillo

12 November 2026–27 Nations League QF 1st Leg	Curaçao	0–0	Panama	Willemstad, Curaçao
20:00 UTC−4		Report		Stadium: Ergilio Hato Stadium; Referee: Tori Penso (United States)

15 November 2026–27 Nations League QF 2nd Leg	Panama	2–0 (2–0 agg.)	Curaçao	Panama City, Panama
18:00 UTC−5	Fajardo 45', 51'	Report		Stadium: Estadio Rommel Fernández; Referee: Marco Ortíz (Mexico)
Note: Panama won 2–0 on aggregate, advanced to the Finals and qualified for the 2027 Gold Cup.

9 December Friendly	Peru	v	Panama	Cusco, Peru
18:00 UTC−5				Stadium: Estadio Garcilaso

=== 2027 ===
25 March 2027 Nations League SF	Canada	v	Panama	Inglewood, United States
TBD				Stadium: SoFi Stadium

28 March 2027 Nations League F/3PG	Panama	v	United States/Mexico	Inglewood, United States
TBD				Stadium: SoFi Stadium

== Coaching staff ==
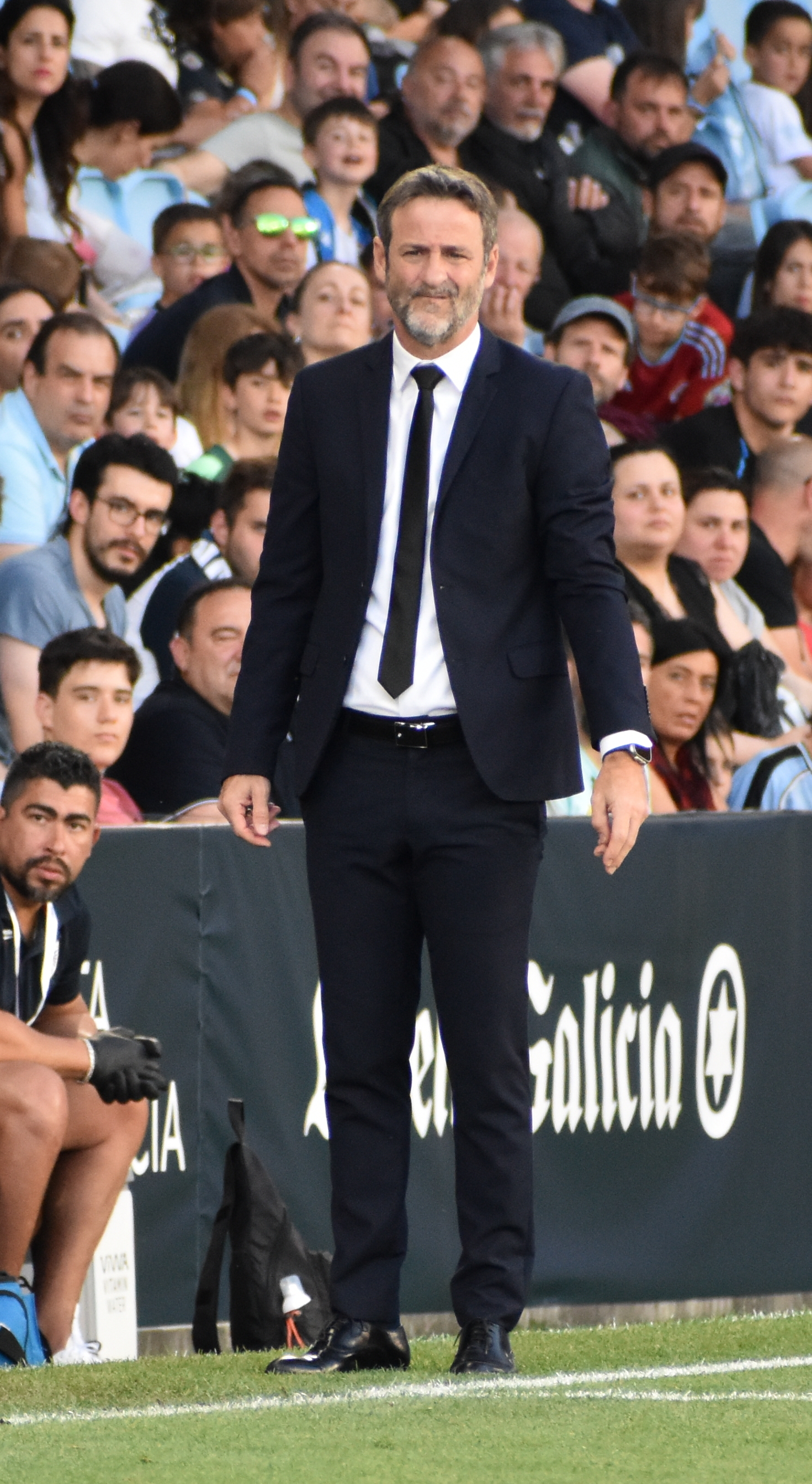
Current head coach Thomas Christiansen, who led Panama to finish as runners-up at the 2023 CONCACAF Gold Cup and 2024–25 CONCACAF Nations League

Position	Name
Head coach	(Spain) (Denmark) Thomas Christiansen
Assistant coach	(Spain) Francisco Javier Sánchez Jara
Assistant coach	(Panama) Jorge Dely Valdés
Goalkeeping coach	(Panama) Donaldo González

=== Managers ===
Caretaker managers are listed in italics.

- (Uruguay) Romeo Parravicini (1938)
- (Peru) Manuel Sánchez Durán (1941)
- (Panama) Emel Ospino (1946)
- (Chile) Óscar Rendoll Gómez (1946, 1951)
- (Panama) Óscar Suman Carrillo (1949)
- (Colombia) Gilberto Casanova (1950)
- (Austria) Moses Stern (1950)
- (Panama) Rogelio Díaz (1952)
- (Panama) Emel Ospino (1956)
- (Spain) José Bech Casablanca (1961, 1967)
- (Argentina) Raúl "Che" Álvarez (1963–64)
- (Panama) Luis Carlos Ponce (1967)
- (Chile) Néstor Valdés (1969)
- (Chile) Renato Panay (1976)
- (Argentina) Omar Muraco (1978)
- (Uruguay) Edgardo Bone Baldi (1979)
- (Uruguay) Luis Borghini (1980)
- (Panama) Rubén Cárdenas (1980)
- (Panama) Orlando Muñoz (1984, 1995)
- (Argentina) Carlos Cavagnaro (1984)
- (Argentina) Juan Colecchio (1986–1987)
- (Uruguay) Miguel Mansilla (1987–1988, 1990, 1999–2000)
- (Uruguay) Gustavo de Simone (1992)
- (Colombia) César Maturana (1995–96)
- (Colombia) Óscar Aristizábal (1999)
- (Panama) Ezequiel Fernandez (2000)
- (Panama) Leopoldo Lee (2000)
- (Romania) Mihai Stoichiță (2001)
- (England) Billy Stenning (2001–02)
- (Brazil) Carlos Alberto da Luz (2002–03)
- (Colombia) José Eugenio Hernández (2004–05)
- (Panama) Julio Dely Valdés (2006)
- (Panama) Víctor René Mendieta (2006)
- (Costa Rica) Alexandre Guimarães (2006–08)
- (Panama) Gary Stempel (2008–09)
- (Panama) Julio Dely Valdés (2010–13, 2019)
- (Colombia) Hernán Darío Gómez (2014–2018)
- (Panama) Gary Stempel (2018–2019)
- (Argentina) Américo Gallego (2019–2020)
- (Spain) Thomas Christiansen (2020–present)

== Players ==
=== Current squad ===
The following players were called up to squad for the 2026–27 CONCACAF Nations League A matches against Curaçao on 12 and 15 November 2026.

Caps and goals correct as of 5 October 2026, after the match against Ecuador.

No.	Pos.	Player	Date of birth (age)	Caps	Goals	Club
22	GK	Orlando Mosquera	25 December 1994 (age 31)	52	0	(Saudi Arabian Football Federation) Al-Fayha
12	GK	Eddie Roberts	1 May 1994 (age 32)	4	0	(Venezuelan Football Federation) Estudiantes de Mérida
	GK	Marcos De León	20 January 1998 (age 28)	1	0	(Panamanian Football Federation) Sporting San Miguelito
23	DF	Amir Murillo	11 February 1996 (age 30)	100	9	(Turkish Football Federation) Beşiktaş
16	DF	Andrés Andrade	16 October 1998 (age 28)	53	1	(Austrian Football Association) LASK
	DF	César Blackman	2 April 1998 (age 28)	45	3	(Slovak Football Association) Slovan Bratislava
	DF	José Córdoba	3 June 2001 (age 25)	35	1	(The Football Association) Norwich City
	DF	Jiovany Ramos	26 January 1997 (age 29)	26	2	(Venezuelan Football Federation) Puerto Cabello
	DF	Jorge Gutiérrez	1 September 1998 (age 28)	21	0	(Peruvian Football Federation) Universitario
	DF	Omar Valencia	8 June 2004 (age 22)	6	1	(United States Soccer Federation) New York Red Bulls
	DF	Martín Krug	9 July 2006 (age 20)	4	0	(Royal Spanish Football Federation) Juventud Torremolinos
8	MF	Adalberto Carrasquilla	28 November 1998 (age 27)	75	3	(Mexican Football Federation) UNAM
6	MF	Cristian Martínez	6 February 1997 (age 29)	71	2	(Slovak Football Association) Slovan Bratislava
	MF	Carlos Harvey	3 February 2000 (age 26)	34	3	(United States Soccer Federation) Minnesota United
	MF	Víctor Griffith	12 December 2000 (age 25)	22	1	(Ecuadorian Football Federation) Emelec
	MF	Giovany Herbert	12 March 2005 (age 21)	6	1	(Ukrainian Association of Football) Kryvbas Kryvyi Rih
	MF	Daivis Murillo	11 December 2005 (age 20)	3	0	(Panamanian Football Federation) Plaza Amador
	FW	Yoel Bárcenas	23 October 1993 (age 33)	106	9	(Hellenic Football Federation) Iraklis
	FW	José Luis Rodríguez	19 June 1998 (age 28)	75	8	(Mexican Football Federation) Juárez
	FW	José Fajardo	18 August 1993 (age 33)	72	17	(Ecuadorian Football Federation) Universidad Católica
10	FW	Ismael Díaz	12 May 1997 (age 29)	58	17	(Mexican Football Federation) León
	FW	Azarias Londoño	21 June 2001 (age 25)	17	1	(Ecuadorian Football Federation) Universidad Católica
	FW	Kadir Barría	18 July 2007 (age 19)	5	2	(Brazilian Football Confederation) Botafogo
18	FW	Josué Vergara	25 July 2007 (age 19)	1	1	(Royal Belgian Football Association) Gent
	FW	Manuel Morán	20 November 1996 (age 30)	0	0	(Costa Rican Football Federation) Cartaginés

=== Recent call-ups ===
The following players have been called up within the past year.

Pos.	Player	Date of birth (age)	Caps	Goals	Club	Latest call-up
GK	Luis Mejía	16 March 1991 (age 35)	56	0	(Uruguay) Nacional	2026 FIFA World Cup
GK	César Samudio	26 March 1994 (age 32)	5	0	(Honduras) Marathón	2026 FIFA World Cup
GK	John Gunn	24 January 2000 (age 26)	2	0	(United States) New England Revolution	v. Bosnia and Herzegovina, 6 June 2026
GK	Ian Flores	20 March 2005 (age 21)	0	0	(Panama) San Francisco	v. Bolivia, 18 January 2026 ^{PRE}
DF	Eduardo Anderson	31 January 2001 (age 25)	9	0	(Russia) Baltika Kaliningrad	v. Ecuador, 5 October 2026
DF	Joseph Jones	30 July 2005 (age 21)	1	0	(Ukraine) Kryvbas Kryvyi Rih	v. Ecuador, 5 October 2026
DF	Jair Modelo	17 July 2004 (age 22)	1	0	(Moldova) Sheriff Tiraspol	v. Ecuador, 5 October 2026
DF	Eric Davis ^{RET}	31 March 1991 (age 35)	108	9	(Panama) Plaza Amador	2026 FIFA World Cup
DF	Fidel Escobar	9 January 1995 (age 31)	100	4	(Costa Rica) Saprissa	2026 FIFA World Cup
DF	Roderick Miller	3 April 1992 (age 34)	50	2	(Azerbaijan) Turan Tovuz	2026 FIFA World Cup
DF	Edgardo Fariña	21 September 2001 (age 25)	18	0	(Russia) Nizhny Novgorod	2026 FIFA World Cup
DF	Iván Anderson	24 November 1997 (age 28)	15	1	(Panama) Universitario	v. Dominican Republic, 3 June 2026
DF	Richard Peralta	20 September 1993 (age 33)	17	1	(Panama) San Francisco	v. Mexico, 22 January 2026
DF	Omar Córdoba	13 June 1994 (age 32)	6	0	(Panama) Plaza Amador	v. Mexico, 22 January 2026
DF	Kevin Galván	10 March 1996 (age 30)	6	0	(Panama) San Francisco	v. Mexico, 22 January 2026
DF	Luis Asprilla	28 May 2001 (age 25)	2	0	(Panama) Tauro	v. Mexico, 22 January 2026
DF	Orman Davis	25 December 2002 (age 23)	2	0	(Panama) Independiente	v. Mexico, 22 January 2026
DF	Javier Rivera	17 March 1998 (age 28)	2	0	(Honduras) Marathón	v. Mexico, 22 January 2026
DF	Daniel Aparicio	17 April 2000 (age 26)	1	0	(Honduras) Real España	v. Mexico, 22 January 2026
DF	Ariel Arroyo	23 January 2005 (age 21)	1	0	(Latvia) Auda	v. Mexico, 22 January 2026
DF	Aimar Sánchez	27 August 2005 (age 21)	1	0	(United States) New York Red Bulls II	v. Mexico, 22 January 2026
DF	Juan Hall	9 March 2006 (age 20)	0	0	(Panama) Sporting San Miguelito	v. Mexico, 22 January 2026
MF	Rafael Mosquera	24 May 2005 (age 21)	3	0	(United States) New York Red Bulls	v. Ecuador, 5 October 2026
MF	Aníbal Godoy ^{RET}	10 February 1990 (age 36)	160	4	(United States) San Diego	2026 FIFA World Cup
MF	Alberto Quintero ^{RET}	18 December 1987 (age 38)	142	7	(Panama) Plaza Amador	2026 FIFA World Cup
MF	César Yanis	28 January 1996 (age 30)	56	5	(Chile) Cobresal	2026 FIFA World Cup
MF	José Murillo	24 February 1995 (age 31)	19	1	(Panama) Plaza Amador	v. Dominican Republic, 3 June 2026
MF	Jovani Welch	7 December 1999 (age 26)	21	1	(Bolivia) The Strongest	v. Mexico, 22 January 2026
MF	Kahiser Lenis	23 July 2000 (age 26)	12	2	(Brazil) Atlético Goianiense	v. Mexico, 22 January 2026
MF	Ricardo Phillips	6 May 2001 (age 25)	10	0	(Panama) Plaza Amador	v. Mexico, 22 January 2026
MF	Ángel Caicedo	19 August 1999 (age 27)	2	0	(El Salvador) Fuerte San Francisco	v. Mexico, 22 January 2026
MF	Abdul Knight	17 January 2002 (age 24)	2	0	(Panama) Plaza Amador	v. Mexico, 22 January 2026
MF	Héctor Hurtado	23 December 1998 (age 27)	1	0	(Panama) Sporting San Miguelito	v. Mexico, 22 January 2026
FW	Tomás Rodríguez	9 March 1999 (age 27)	16	4	(Ecuador) Barcelona	v. Ecuador, 5 October 2026
FW	Mijahir Jiménez	28 March 2007 (age 19)	2	0	(United States) New York Red Bulls	v. Ecuador, 5 October 2026
FW	Cecilio Waterman	13 April 1991 (age 35)	56	15	(Chile) Universidad de Concepción	2026 FIFA World Cup
FW	Gustavo Herrera	18 November 2005 (age 21)	3	0	(Spain) Conquense	v. Mexico, 22 January 2026
FW	Saed Díaz	23 June 1999 (age 27)	0	0	(Panama) Tauro	v. Mexico, 22 January 2026
^{INJ} Withdrew due to injury / absent form the national team due to injury.^{COV} Withdrew due to COVID-19^{PRE} Preliminary squad.^{RET} Retired from the national team.^{SUS} Serving Suspension.^{WD} Withdrew for personal reasons.

== Player records ==
As of 5 October 2026
Players in bold are still active with Panama.

=== Most capped players ===
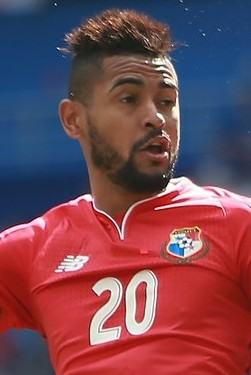
Aníbal Godoy is Panama's most capped player with 160 appearances.

Rank	Player	Caps	Goals	Career
1	Aníbal Godoy	160	4	2010–2026
2	Gabriel Gómez	147	12	2003–2018
3	Alberto Quintero	142	7	2007–2026
4	Jaime Penedo	137	0	2003–2018
5	Armando Cooper	123	9	2006–2022
5	Blas Pérez	123	42	2001–2018
7	Román Torres	121	10	2005–2019
8	Eric Davis	109	9	2010–2026
9	Luis Tejada	108	43	2001–2018
10	**Yoel Bárcenas**	107	10	2014–present

=== Top goalscorers ===
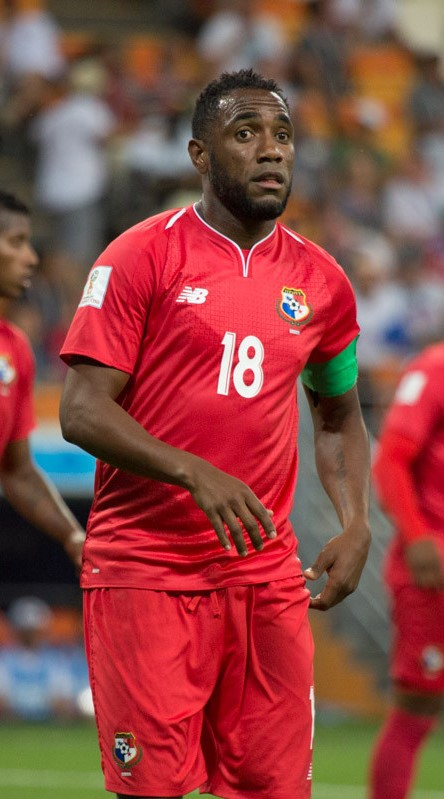
Luis Tejada is Panama's all-time top scorer with 43 goals.

Rank	Player	Goals	Caps	Ratio	Career
1	Luis Tejada	43	108	0.4	2001–2018
2	Blas Pérez	42	123	0.34	2001–2018
3	Gabriel Torres	24	104	0.23	2005–2022
4	Luis Ernesto Tapia	20	77	0.26	1960–1979
5	Jorge Dely Valdés	19	48	0.4	1991–2005
6	James Anderson	18	23	0.78	1938–1948
6	Julio Dely Valdés	18	44	0.41	1990–2005
8	Carlos Martínez	17	20	0.85	1946–1954
8	**Ismael Díaz**	17	59	0.29	2014–present
8	**José Fajardo**	17	72	0.24	2017–present

== Competitive record ==
=== FIFA World Cup ===
FIFA World Cup record										Qualification record					
Year	Round	Position	Pld	W	D	L	GF	GA	Squad	Pld	W	D	L	GF	GA
(Uruguay) 1930	Not a FIFA member									Not a FIFA member					
(Italy) 1934	Not a FIFA member									Not a FIFA member					
(France) 1938	Declined participation									Declined participation					
(Brazil) 1950	Declined participation									Declined participation					
(Switzerland) 1954	Declined participation									Declined participation					
(Sweden) 1958	Declined participation									Declined participation					
(Chile) 1962	Declined participation									Declined participation					
(England) 1966	Declined participation									Declined participation					
(Mexico) 1970	Declined participation									Declined participation					
(West Germany) 1974	Declined participation									Declined participation					
(Argentina) 1978	Did not qualify									6	1	1	4	7	21
(Spain) 1982	Did not qualify									8	0	1	7	3	24
(Mexico) 1986	Did not qualify									2	0	0	2	0	4
(Italy) 1990	Did not qualify									2	0	1	1	1	3
(United States) 1994	Did not qualify									2	1	0	1	2	5
(France) 1998	Did not qualify									8	3	2	3	14	13
(South Korea) (Japan) 2002	Did not qualify									10	3	1	6	9	19
(Germany) 2006	Did not qualify									18	4	4	10	19	32
(South Africa) 2010	Did not qualify									2	1	0	1	2	3
(Brazil) 2014	Did not qualify									20	8	7	5	31	18
(Russia) 2018	Group stage	32nd	3	0	0	3	2	11	Squad	16	6	5	5	16	15
(Qatar) 2022	Did not qualify									20	11	4	5	38	21
(Canada) (Mexico) (United States) 2026	Group stage	43rd	3	0	0	3	0	4	Squad	10	7	3	0	19	5
(Morocco) (Portugal) (Spain) 2030	To be determined									To be determined					
(Saudi Arabia) 2034	To be determined									To be determined					
Total	Group stage	2/23	6	0	0	6	2	15	—	124	45	29	50	161	183

FIFA World Cup history
First match	Belgium 3–0 Panama (18 June 2018; Sochi, Russia)
Biggest win	—
Biggest defeat	England 6–1 Panama (24 June 2018; Nizhny Novgorod, Russia)
Best result	Group stage (2018, 2026)
Worst result	—

=== CONCACAF Gold Cup ===
CONCACAF Championship / Gold Cup record
Year	Round	Position	Pld	W	D	L	GF	GA	Squad
(El Salvador) 1963	Group stage	6th	4	1	2	1	8	4	—
(Guatemala) 1965	Did not participate								
(Honduras) 1967	Did not qualify								
(Costa Rica) 1969	Did not qualify								
(Trinidad and Tobago) 1971	Did not participate								
(Haiti) 1973	Did not participate								
(Mexico) 1977	Did not qualify								
(Honduras) 1981	Did not qualify								
1985	Did not qualify								
1989	Did not qualify								
(United States) 1991	Did not participate								
(Mexico) (United States) 1993	Group stage	7th	3	0	1	2	3	8	Squad
(United States) 1996	Did not qualify								
(United States) 1998	Did not qualify								
(United States) 2000	Did not qualify								
(United States) 2002	Did not qualify								
(Mexico) (United States) 2003	Did not qualify								
(United States) 2005	Runners-up	2nd	6	2	3	1	7	6	Squad
(United States) 2007	Quarter-finals	6th	4	1	1	2	6	7	Squad
(United States) 2009	Quarter-finals	7th	4	1	1	2	7	5	Squad
(United States) 2011	Semi-finals	3rd	5	2	2	1	7	6	Squad
(United States) 2013	Runners-up	2nd	6	4	1	1	11	4	Squad
(Canada) (United States) 2015	Third place	3rd	6	0	5	1	6	7	Squad
(United States) 2017	Quarter-finals	5th	4	2	1	1	6	3	Squad
(Costa Rica) (Jamaica) (United States) 2019	Quarter-finals	7th	4	2	0	2	6	4	Squad
(United States) 2021	Group stage	9th	3	1	1	1	8	7	Squad
(Canada) (United States) 2023	Runners-up	2nd	6	3	2	1	11	6	Squad
(Canada) (United States) 2025	Quarter-finals	5th	4	3	1	0	11	4	Squad
2027	Qualified								
Total	Runners-up	14/29	59	22	21	16	97	71	—

CONCACAF Championship / Gold Cup history
First match	El Salvador 1–1 Panama (23 March 1963; San Salvador, El Salvador)
Biggest win	Panama 6–1 Cuba (20 July 2013; Atlanta, United States)
Biggest defeat	Honduras 5–1 Panama (10 July 1993; Dallas, United States)
Best result	Runners-up (2005, 2013, 2023)
Worst result	Group stage (1963, 1993, 2021)

=== CONCACAF Nations League ===
CONCACAF Nations League record
League phase / Quarter-finals										Finals								
Season	Division	Group	Pld	W	D	L	GF	GA	P/R	Year	Result	Pld	W	D	L	GF	GA	Squad
2019–20	A	B	4	1	0	3	5	9	Same position	(United States) 2021	Did not qualify							
2022–23	A	B	4	3	1	0	8	0	Same position	(United States) 2023	Fourth place	2	0	0	2	0	3	Squad
2023–24	A	A	6	5	1	0	15	3	Same position	(United States) 2024	Fourth place	2	0	0	2	0	4	Squad
2024–25	A	Bye	2	1	1	0	3	2	Same position	(United States) 2025	Runners-up	2	1	0	1	2	2	Squad
2026–27	A	Bye	2	1	1	0	2	0	Same position	2027	Qualified							
Total	—	—	18	11	4	3	33	14	—	Total	0 Titles	6	1	0	5	2	9	—

CONCACAF Nations League history
First match	Bermuda 1–4 Panama (5 September 2019; Hamilton, Bermuda)
Biggest win	Panama 5–0 Martinique (9 June 2022; Panama City, Panama)
Biggest defeat	Panama 0–3 Mexico (15 November 2019; Panama City, Panama); Panama 0–3 Mexico (21 March 2024; Arlington, United States)
Best result	Runners-up (2024–25)
Worst result	Eighth place (2019−20)

=== Copa América ===
Copa América record
Year	Round	Position	Pld	W	D	L	GF	GA	Squad
(United States) 2016	Group stage	12th	3	1	0	2	4	10	Squad
(United States) 2024	Quarter-finals	7th	4	2	0	2	6	10	Squad
Total	Quarter-finals	2/2	7	3	0	4	10	20	—

Copa América history
First match	Panama 2–1 Bolivia (6 June 2016; Orlando, United States)
Biggest win	Bolivia 1–3 Panama (1 July 2024; Orlando, United States)
Biggest defeat	Argentina 5–0 Panama (10 June 2016; Chicago, United States); Colombia 5–0 Panama (6 July 2024; Glendale, United States)
Best result	Quarter-finals (2024)
Worst result	Group stage (2016)

=== Copa Centroamericana ===
Copa Centroamericana record
Year	Round	Position	Pld	W	D	L	GF	GA
(Costa Rica) 1991	Preliminary round	5th	2	1	0	1	2	3
(Honduras) 1993	Third place	3rd	3	0	1	2	1	5
(El Salvador) 1995	Fifth place	5th	2	0	0	2	0	3
(Guatemala) 1997	Fifth place	5th	2	0	0	2	0	7
(Costa Rica) 1999	Did not participate							
(Honduras) 2001	Fourth place	4th	3	0	1	2	3	6
(Panama) 2003	Fifth place	5th	5	1	1	3	4	5
(Guatemala) 2005	Fourth place	4th	4	1	0	3	1	5
(El Salvador) 2007	Runners-up	2nd	6	4	1	1	5	2
(Honduras) 2009	Champions	1st	4	2	1	1	2	3
(Panama) 2011	Third place	3rd	5	4	0	1	7	1
(Costa Rica) 2013	Fifth place	5th	2	0	2	0	1	1
(United States) 2014	Third place	3rd	3	2	1	0	5	2
(Panama) 2017	Runners-up	2nd	5	3	1	1	4	2
Total	1 Title	13/14	46	18	9	19	35	45

=== CCCF Championship ===
CCCF Championship record
Year	Round	Position	Pld	W	D	L	GF	GA
(Costa Rica) 1941	Fourth place	4th	4	1	1	2	11	16
(El Salvador) 1943	Did not participate							
(Costa Rica) 1946	Round-robin	5th	5	1	1	3	5	16
(Guatemala) 1948	Third place	3rd	8	4	0	4	19	24
(Panama) 1951	Champions	1st	4	3	1	0	13	3
(Costa Rica) 1953	Round-robin	7th	6	0	1	5	6	16
(Honduras) 1955	Did not participate							
(Netherlands Antilles) 1957	Fourth place	4th	4	1	0	3	3	8
(Cuba) 1960	Did not participate							
(Costa Rica) 1961	Round 1	7th	4	1	0	3	3	11
Total	1 Title	7/10	35	11	4	20	60	94

== Head-to-head results ==
Updated as of 5 October 2026.

Opponent	Pld	W	D	L	GF	GA	GD	W%
Anguilla	1	1	0	0	13	0	+13	100
Argentina	2	0	0	2	1	8	–5	0
Armenia	1	0	1	0	1	1	0	0
Aruba	1	0	1	0	0	0	0	0
Bahamas	1	0	0	1	0	1	–1	0
Bahrain	2	1	0	1	2	5	–3	50
Barbados	1	1	0	0	1	0	+1	100
Belgium	1	0	0	1	0	3	–3	0
Belize	7	5	2	0	12	3	+9	71.43
Bermuda	5	2	1	2	9	6	+3	40
Bolivia	10	5	1	4	17	16	+1	50
Bosnia and Herzegovina	1	0	1	0	1	1	0	0
Brazil	7	0	1	6	3	25	–22	0
Cameroon	1	0	1	0	1	1	0	0
Canada	14	2	7	5	9	14	–5	14.29
Chile	4	0	1	3	4	12	–8	0
Chinese Taipei	2	0	2	0	2	2	0	0
Colombia	15	4	0	11	11	37	–26	26.67
Costa Rica	64	19	16	29	63	122	–59	29.69
Croatia	1	0	0	1	0	1	–1	0
Cuba	39	16	11	12	48	43	+5	41.03
Curaçao (Note: Includes the results of Netherlands Antilles.)	10	2	4	4	18	23	–5	20
Denmark	1	0	0	1	0	1	–1	0
Dominica	3	3	0	0	10	1	+9	100
Dominican Republic	8	7	1	0	18	6	+12	87.5
Ecuador	9	1	3	5	5	18	–14	11.11
El Salvador	63	23	16	24	85	81	+4	36.51
England	3	0	0	3	1	10	–9	0
Ghana	1	0	0	1	0	1	–1	0
Grenada	3	3	0	0	10	1	+9	100
Guadeloupe	3	2	0	1	9	6	+3	66.67
Guatemala	44	18	12	14	64	67	–3	40.91
Guinea-Bissau	1	0	0	1	0	1	–1	0
Guyana	3	3	0	0	8	2	+6	100
Haiti	20	4	7	9	18	27	–9	20
Honduras	52	12	13	27	40	79	–39	23.08
Hong Kong	1	0	0	1	1	3	–2	0
India	1	0	1	0	1	1	0	0
Iran	2	0	0	2	1	3	–2	0
Jamaica	22	11	7	4	31	17	+14	50
Japan	2	0	0	2	0	4	–4	0
Macau	1	0	0	1	1	2	–1	0
Martinique	5	4	1	0	11	0	+11	100
Mexico	27	2	6	19	16	48	–32	7.41
Montserrat	1	1	0	0	3	1	+2	100
New Zealand	1	0	1	0	1	1	0	0
Nicaragua	31	23	1	5	81	24	+57	74.19
Northern Ireland	1	0	1	0	0	0	0	0
Norway	1	0	0	1	0	1	–1	0
Paraguay	6	0	1	5	1	10	–10	0
Peru	13	3	1	9	9	29	–20	23.08
Portugal	1	0	0	1	0	2	–2	0
Puerto Rico	6	4	1	1	20	3	+17	66.67
Qatar	3	1	1	1	8	5	+3	33.33
Saint Lucia	2	2	0	0	7	0	+7	100
Saudi Arabia	1	0	1	0	1	1	0	0
Serbia	2	0	2	0	1	1	0	0
South Africa	3	1	2	0	4	3	+1	33.33
South Korea	1	0	1	0	2	2	0	0
Spain	1	0	0	1	1	5	–4	0
Suriname	5	1	2	2	6	11	–5	20
Switzerland	1	0	0	1	0	6	–6	0
Trinidad and Tobago	25	7	7	11	23	33	–10	28
Tunisia	1	0	0	1	1	2	–1	0
United States	28	4	6	18	19	55	–36	14.29
Uruguay	5	0	0	5	2	18	–16	0
Venezuela	24	5	9	10	26	37	–11	20.83
Wales	1	0	1	0	1	1	0	0
Total results	637	198	167	272	760	965	–205	31.08

== Honours ==
=== Continental ===
- CONCACAF Gold Cup
  - (silver) Runners-up (3): 2005, 2013, 2023
  - (bronze) Third place (1): 2015
- CONCACAF Nations League
  - (silver) Runners-up (1): 2024–25

=== Subcontinental ===
- CCCF Championship (Note: Official competition organized by CCCF, the former subcontinental confederation affiliated with FIFA as the governing of football in the Central American and Caribbean Zones (1938–1961), and a direct predecessor of CONCACAF.)
  - (gold) Champions (1): 1951
  - (bronze) Third place (1): 1948
- Copa de Naciones UNCAF / Copa Centroamericana
  - (gold) Champions (1): 2009
  - (silver) Runners-up (2): 2007, 2017
  - (bronze) Third place (3): 1993, 2011, 2014
- Central American and Caribbean Games
  - (silver) Silver medal (1): 1946
- Bolivarian Games
  - (bronze) Bronze medal (2): 1970, 1973

=== Summary ===
Including honours in competitions directly organized/recognized by FIFA or an affiliated confederation.

Competition	1st place, gold medalist(s)	2nd place, silver medalist(s)	3rd place, bronze medalist(s)	Total
CONCACAF Gold Cup	0	3	1	4
CONCACAF Nations League	0	1	0	1
CCCF Championship	1	0	1	2
Total	1	4	2	7

== FIFA World Ranking ==
Last update was on November 18, 2026. Source:

Best Ranking Worst Ranking Best Mover Worst Mover

Panama's FIFA World Ranking History
Rank	Year	Best		Worst	
Rank	Year	Rank	Move	Rank	Move
44	2026	33	Steady	44	▼10
30	2025	29	▲7	33	▼2
36	2024	35	▲8	45	▼3
41	2023	41	▲12	58	Steady
61	2022	60	▲3	61	▼1
63	2021	63	▲6	78	▼1
78	2020	77	▲4	81	▼1
81	2019	74	▲2	81	▼5
71	2018	53	▲2	71	▼14
55	2017	49	▲11	61	▼9
58	2016	51	▲7	69	▼18
64	2015	53	▲8	65	▼8
57	2014	29	▲8	63	▼30
38	2013	35	▲11	51	▼8
51	2012	43	▲7	54	▼6
49	2011	49	▲15	68	▼13
64	2010	59	▲27	97	▼20
70	2009	50	▲33	83	▼9
88	2008	60	▲7	96	▼23
67	2007	52	▲20	80	▼14
81	2006	59	▲24	98	▼39
78	2005	76	▲15	101	▼3
100	2004	100	▲14	127	▼2
125	2003	116	▲9	130	▼4
129	2002	111	Steady	129	▼6
109	2001	109	▲10	125	▼2
121	2000	118	▲16	139	▼3
138	1999	133	▲5	143	▼2
131	1998	120	▲4	131	▼6
119	1997	103	▲1	119	▼5
101	1996	101	▲15	133	▼5
126	1995	126	▲15	150	▼15
140	1994	130	▲1	140	▼5
132	1993	125	▲1	132	▼5
120	1992	120	Steady	120	Steady

== See also ==
- Panama national under-23 football team
- Panama national under-20 football team
- Panama national under-17 football team
- Football in Panama
