= Eric Davis (Panamanian footballer) =

Panamanian football player (born 1991)

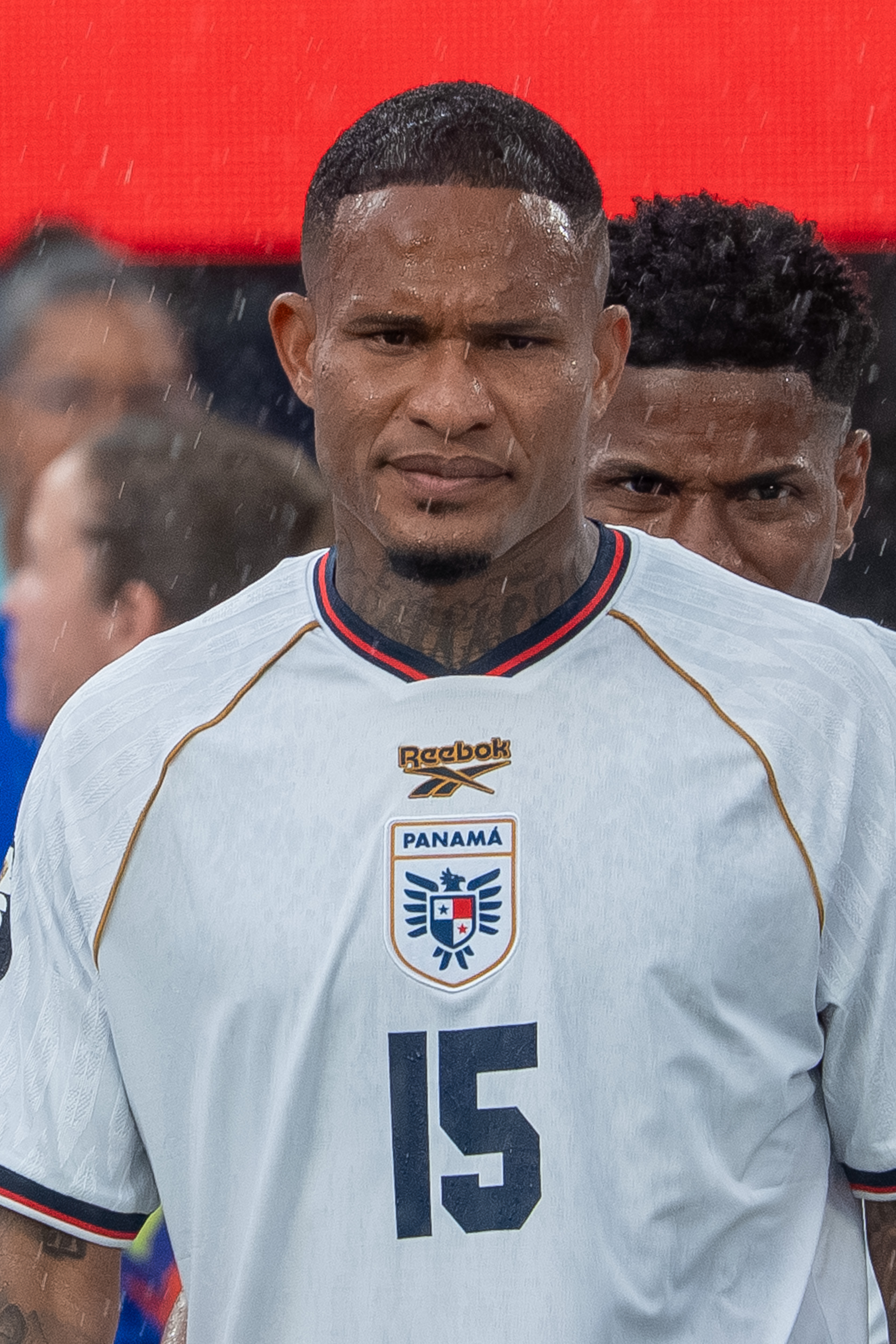
- Davis with Panama in 2026

Personal information
- Full name: Eric Javier Davis Grajales
- Date of birth: 31 March 1991 (age 35)
- Place of birth: Colón, Panama
- Height: 1.80 m (5 ft 11 in)
- Position: Left-back

Team information
- Current team: Plaza Amador
- Number: 31

Senior career*
Years	Team	Apps	(Gls)
2009–2011	Árabe Unido	44	(0)
2011–2013	Fénix	41	(0)
2013	→ Árabe Unido (loan)	8	(0)
2013–2015	Sporting San Miguelito	64	(7)
2015–2023	DAC Dunajská Streda	164	(18)
2023	D.C. United	8	(0)
2024	FC Košice	13	(0)
2024–2025	Vila Nova	7	(1)
2025–	Plaza Amador	20	(2)

International career^{‡}
2010–2011	Panama U20	11	(0)
2012	Panama U23	6	(1)
2010–2026	Panama	109	(9)
Medal record
Men's football
Representing Panama
CONCACAF Gold Cup
Runner-up	2023 United States–Canada	Team
- * Club domestic league appearances and goals as of 23 May 2026 ‡ National team caps and goals as of 23:55, 27 June 2026 (UTC)

Eric Javier Davis Grajales (born 31 March 1991) is a Panamanian professional footballer who plays as a left-back for Plaza Amador.

== Club career ==
=== Árabe Unido ===
In 2009, he signed for Liga Panameña de Fútbol club Árabe Unido where he made 44 appearances.

=== Fénix ===
In mid-2011 he signed a new contract with Uruguayan Primera División club Centro Atlético Fénix. He made his debut on 12 May 2012, playing 10 minutes against Club Sportivo Cerrito.

In summer 2013, Davis joined Sporting San Miguelito and he returned to Árabe Unido in summer 2015.

=== Dunajská Streda ===
In September 2015, Davis signed a contract with Fortuna liga club Dunajská Streda. He spent eight seasons with the club, making more than 140 league appearances and helping them secure several top-three finishes in the Slovak Super Liga, including runner-up finishes in 2018–19, 2020–21 and 2022–23.

=== Later career ===
Davis joined MLS side D.C. United in 2023, before returning to Slovakia with FC Košice in February 2024. He subsequently moved to Brazilian club Vila Nova, before returning to Panama to sign for Plaza Amador in July 2025.

== International career ==
Davis was part of the Panama U-20 squad that participated in the 2011 CONCACAF U-20 Championship where he help his nation qualify to the 2011 FIFA U-20 World Cup in Colombia.

His senior international debut for Panama came on 11 August 2010 against Venezuela, in a friendly match played in Panama City and he has, as of 8 June 2015, earned a total of 19 caps, scoring no goals.

In 2011, he was called up for the 2011 CONCACAF Gold Cup by Julio Dely Valdés. He played for Panama in the 2015 CONCACAF Gold Cup.

In May 2018, he was named in Panama's 23-man squad for the 2018 FIFA World Cup in Russia, where he played in two matches against England and Tunisia as Panama were knocked out at the Group Stage.

In May 2026, he was selected in Panama's 26-man squad for the 2026 FIFA World Cup. He announced his retirement from international football after the conclusion of the tournament.

== Career statistics ==
=== International ===
As of match played 27 June 2026

Appearances and goals by national team and year
National team	Year	Apps	Goals
Panama	2010	3	0
Panama	2011	8	0
Panama	2012	1	0
Panama	2014	4	0
Panama	2015	10	0
Panama	2016	2	0
Panama	2017	8	0
Panama	2018	8	0
Panama	2019	7	1
Panama	2021	15	3
Panama	2022	7	1
Panama	2023	12	2
Panama	2024	8	0
Panama	2025	9	2
Panama	2026	6	0
Total		109	9

Scores and results list Panama's goal tally first.

List of international goals scored by Eric Davis
No.	Date	Venue	Opponent	Score	Result	Competition
1.	22 June 2019	FirstEnergy Stadium, Cleveland, United States	Guyana	3–1	4–2	2019 CONCACAF Gold Cup
2.	13 July 2021	BBVA Stadium, Houston, United States	Qatar	3–3	3–3	2021 CONCACAF Gold Cup
3.	17 July 2021	BBVA Stadium, Houston, United States	Honduras	1–1	2–3	2021 CONCACAF Gold Cup
4.	12 November 2021	Estadio Olímpico Metropolitano, San Pedro Sula, Honduras	Honduras	3–2	3–2	2022 FIFA World Cup qualification
5.	30 January 2022	Estadio Rommel Fernández, Panama City, Panama	Jamaica	2–1	3–2	2022 FIFA World Cup qualification
6.	12 September 2023	Estadio Doroteo Guamuch Flores, Guatemala City, Guatemala	Guatemala	1–0	1–1	2023–24 CONCACAF Nations League A
7.	17 October 2023	Estadio Rommel Fernández, Panama City, Panama	Guatemala	2–0	3–0	2023–24 CONCACAF Nations League A
8.	10 June 2025	Estadio Rommel Fernández, Panama City, Panama	Nicaragua	3–0	3–0	2026 FIFA World Cup qualification
9.	18 November 2025	Estadio Rommel Fernández, Panama City, Panama	El Salvador	2–0	3–0	2026 FIFA World Cup qualification

== Honours ==
Club

Deportivo Árabe Unido

- Liga LPF: 2009-A, 2010-C

Plaza Amador

- Liga LPF: 2025-A, 2025-C

Panama

- CONCACAF Gold Cup runner-up: 2023; third place: 2015

Individual

- Slovak Super Liga Goal of the Month: September 2019
- Slovak Super Liga Team of the Season: 2019–20

== See also ==
- List of men's footballers with 100 or more international caps
