= Richard Peralta =

Panamanian footballer (born 1993)

Personal information
- Full name: Richard Peralta Robledo
- Date of birth: 20 September 1993 (age 33)
- Place of birth: Panama City, Panama
- Height: 1.82 m (6 ft 0 in)
- Position: Defender

Team information
- Current team: Tauro
- Number: 3

Senior career*
Years	Team	Apps	(Gls)
2010–2020	Alianza	88	(3)
2020-	Tauro	17	(1)

International career^{‡}
2014–	Panama	7	(0)
- * Club domestic league appearances and goals ‡ National team caps and goals as of 3 July 2019

Richard Peralta Robledo (born 20 September 1993) is a Panamanian professional footballer who plays as a defender for Liga LPF club Tauro and the Panama national team.

== Club career ==
He started his career at Alianza in 2010. In January 2015, Peralta went on trial to Honduran giants Motagua but the move was not materialized.

== International career ==
Peralta won the football tournament at the 2013 Central American Games with the Panama U20 team. The same year he played in the CONCACAF U-20 Championship where the team were knocked out of the competition in the group stage.

He made his senior debut for Panama in a 3-0 loss against Peru in August 2014. He was named in Panama's 20-man squad for the 2014 Copa Centroamericana.

In May 2018 he was named in Panama’s preliminary 35 man squad for the 2018 World Cup in Russia. However, he did not make the final 23.
