= Omar Córdoba =

Panamanian footballer (born 1994)

Personal information
- Full name: Omar Federico Córdoba Quintero
- Date of birth: June 13, 1994 (age 32)
- Place of birth: Panama City, Panama
- Height: 1.65 m (5 ft 5 in)
- Position: Defender

Team information
- Current team: Independiente
- Number: 6

Senior career*
Years	Team	Apps	(Gls)
2012–2016	Tauro	51	(1)
2017–	Independiente	109	(3)

International career^{‡}
2021–	Panama	4	(0)
- * Club domestic league appearances and goals as of 3 July 2021 ‡ National team caps and goals as of 17 January 2022

Omar Federico Córdoba Quintero (born 13 June 1994) is a Panamanian footballer currently playing as a defender for Independiente de La Chorrera and the Panama national team.

== Career ==
=== International career ===
In June 2021, Córdoba made his debut for Panama in a 2022 World Cup qualifier against Anguilla.

== Honours ==
Tauro F.C.

- Liga Panameña de Futbol: Apertura 2013

C.A. Independiente de La Chorrera

- Liga Panameña de Futbol: 2018 Clausura, 2019 Clausura
