= Tyrone Sterling =

English-born Grenadian footballer

Personal information
- Full name: Tyrone Zephania Sterling
- Date of birth: 8 October 1987 (age 39)
- Place of birth: Bromley, England
- Position: Defender

Senior career*
Years	Team	Apps	(Gls)
2007–2013	Cray Wanderers	235	(13)
2013–2017	Dover Athletic	128	(5)
2013–2014	→ Dartford (loan)	34	(0)
2017–2018	Bromley	44	(0)
2018–2019	Concord Rangers	39	(1)
2019–2020	Hemel Hempstead Town	31	(0)
2020–2021	Concord Rangers	12	(0)
2021–2022	Dulwich Hamlet	31	(2)
2022–2023	Dover Athletic	35	(1)
2023–2025	Margate	50	(3)
Total		639	(25)

International career^{‡}
2018–2022	Grenada	16	(0)
- * Club domestic league appearances and goals as of 11 September 2025 (UTC) ‡ National team caps and goals as of 11 September 2025 (UTC)

Tyrone Zephania Sterling (born 8 October 1987) is a Grenadian former professional footballer who played as a defender.

== Club career ==
On 24 May 2019, Sterling joined Hemel Hempstead Town.

In June 2022, Sterling returned to Dover Athletic with the club having recently been relegated to the National League South, their first season in the division since Sterling was part of the squad that had earned promotion eight years previously. Following survival on the final day of the season, he was not one of the four players to be retained by the club.

On 18 May 2023, Sterling agreed to join Isthmian League Premier Division club Margate.

On 23 April 2025, Sterling announced that he would be retiring at the end of the season.

== International career ==
Sterling made his debut for the Grenada national football team in a 2–0 CONCACAF Nations League loss to Cuba national football team on 12 October 2018. He also represented England's 6-a-side team at the 2019 Socca World Cup.

== Coaching career ==
Following his retirement from playing, Sterling remained with Isthmian League South East Division club Margate as first-team coach. In September 2025, he departed the club to pursue a new career opportunity in Dubai.

== Honours ==
Dover Athletic

- Conference South play-off winners: 2013–14

Bromley

- FA Trophy runner-up: 2017–18

Concord Rangers

- FA Trophy runner-up: 2019–20
