= César Yanis =

Panamanian footballer (born 1996)

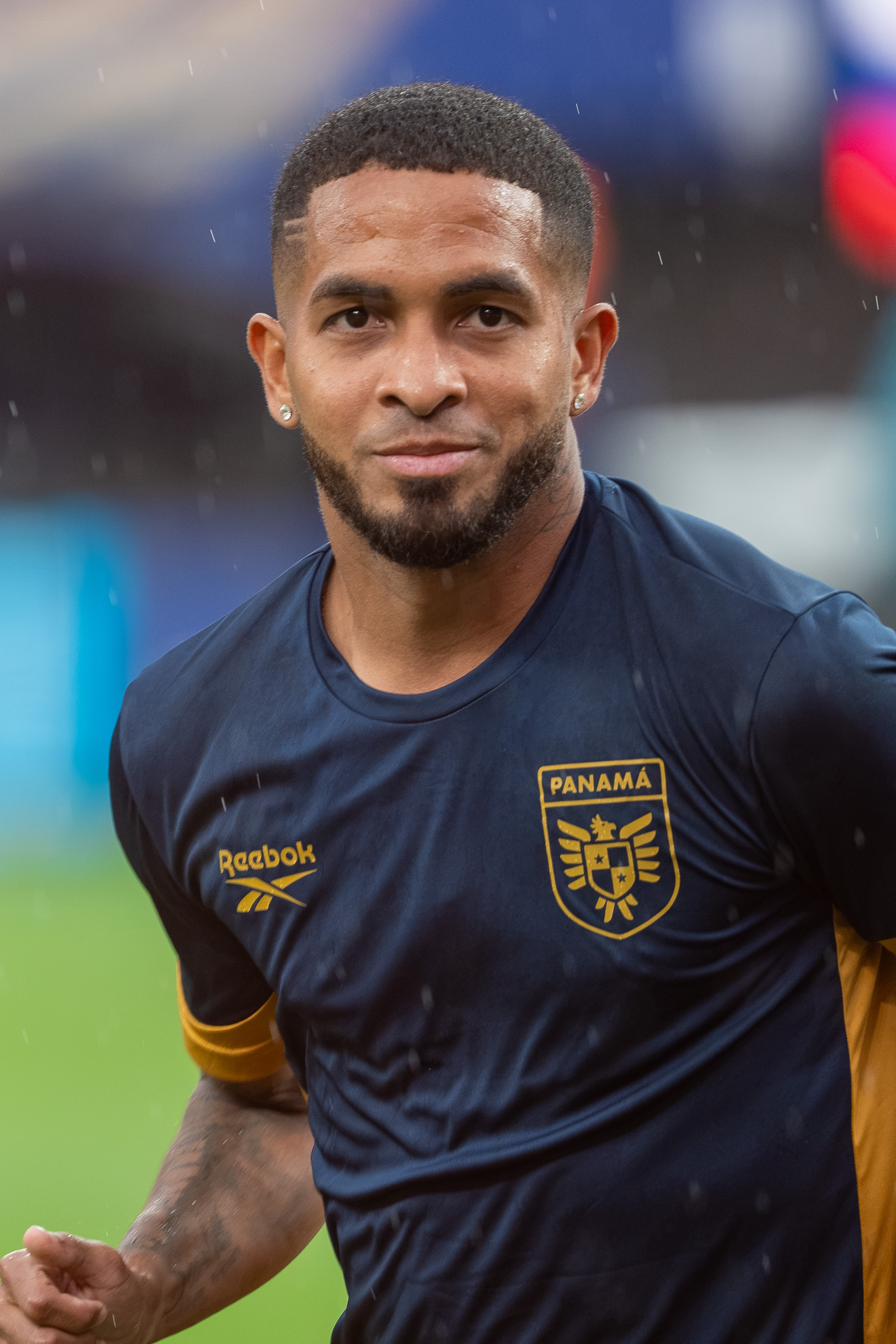
- Yanis with Panama in 2026

Personal information
- Full name: César Augusto Yanis Velasco
- Date of birth: 28 January 1996 (age 30)
- Place of birth: Panama City, Panama
- Height: 1.60 m (5 ft 3 in)
- Position: Winger

Team information
- Current team: Cobresal (on loan from San Carlos)
- Number: 7

Senior career*
Years	Team	Apps	(Gls)
2014–2016	San Francisco	9	(0)
2016–2017	Chorrillo	7	(0)
2017–2020	Costa del Este	67	(6)
2021	Deportivo del Este	16	(3)
2021	→ Zaragoza (loan)	2	(0)
2022–2023	Potros del Este	25	(11)
2022	→ Zamora (loan)	14	(1)
2023–	San Carlos	63	(9)
2025	→ Cobresal (loan)	26	(1)
2026–	Cobresal	11	(0)

International career^{‡}
2020–	Panama	56	(5)
Medal record
Men's football
Representing Panama
CONCACAF Gold Cup
Runner-up	2023 United States–Canada	Team
- * Club domestic league appearances and goals as of 23 May 2025 ‡ National team caps and goals as of 3 June 2026

César Augusto Yanis Velasco (born 28 January 1996) is a Panamanian professional footballer who plays as left winger for Chilean club Cobresal, on loan from Costa Rican club San Carlos, and the Panama national team.

== Club career ==
Born in Panama City, Yanis played for local sides San Francisco, Chorrillo and Costa del Este. On 31 August 2021, he moved abroad and joined Spanish Segunda División side Real Zaragoza on a one-year loan deal.

In 2025, Yanis moved to Chile and joined Cobresal on loan from San Carlos. In December 2025, he renewed with them for a season.

== International career ==
Yanis made his debut for the Panama national team in a 0–0 friendly tie with Nicaragua on 26 February 2020.

On 17 July 2021, Yanis scored his first goal for Panama against Honduras.

== Career statistics ==
=== International ===
As of match played 3 June 2026

Appearances and goals by national team and year
National team	Year	Apps	Goals
Panama	2020	6	0
Panama	2021	18	2
Panama	2022	13	1
Panama	2023	9	0
Panama	2024	4	1
Panama	2025	5	1
Panama	2026	1	0
Total		56	5

=== International goals ===
No.	Date	Venue	Opponent	Score	Result	Competition
1	17 July 2021	BBVA Stadium, Houston, United States	Honduras	2–1	2–3	2021 CONCACAF Gold Cup
2	12 November 2021	Estadio Olímpico Metropolitano, San Pedro Sula, Honduras	Honduras	2–2	3–2	2022 FIFA World Cup qualification
3	15 November 2022	Al Hamriya Sports Club Stadium, Al Hamriyah, United Arab Emirates	Venezuela	2–0	2–2	Friendly
4	1 July 2024	Inter&Co Stadium, Orlando, United States	Bolivia	3–1	3–1	2024 Copa América
5	10 June 2025	Estadio Rommel Fernández, Panama City, Panama	Nicaragua	1–0	3–0	2026 FIFA World Cup qualification

== Honours ==
Panama

- CONCACAF Gold Cup runner-up: 2023
- CONCACAF Nations League runner-up: 2024–25
