= Panama national football team results (2020–present) =

This article provides details of international football games played by the Panama national football team from 2020 to present.

== Results ==
Key
Win
Draw
Defeat

=== 2020 ===
25 February Friendly	Nicaragua	0–0	Panama	Managua, Nicaragua
20:00 UTC−6		Report		Stadium: National Football Stadium; Referee: Óscar Moncada (Honduras)

4 March Friendly	Guatemala	0–2	Panama	Guatemala City, Guatemala
20:00 UTC−6		Report	Murillo 44'; Aguilar 83'	Stadium: Estadio Doroteo Guamuch Flores; Referee: Germán Martínez (El Salvador)

27 March Friendly	El Salvador	Cancelled	Panama	San Salvador, El Salvador
19:00 UTC−6				Stadium: Cuscatlán Stadium

31 March Friendly	Costa Rica	Cancelled	Panama	Cartago, Costa Rica
20:00 UTC−6				Stadium: Estadio Fello Meza

10 October Friendly	Costa Rica	0–1	Panama	San José, Costa Rica
20:00 UTC−6		Report	Ayarza 90+2'	Stadium: Estadio Nacional; Attendance: 0 Referee: Keylor Herrera (Costa Rica)

13 October Friendly	Costa Rica	0–1	Panama	San José, Costa Rica
20:00 UTC−6		Report	Ayarza 39'	Stadium: Estadio Nacional; Attendance: 0 Referee: Juan Calderón (Costa Rica)

13 November Friendly	Japan	1–0	Panama	Graz, Austria
15:15 UTC+1	Minamino 61' (pen.)	Report		Stadium: Liebenauer Stadium; Referee: Christian-Petru Ciochirca (Austria)

16 November Friendly	United States	6–2	Panama	Wiener Neustadt, Austria
20:45 UTC+1	Reyna 18'; Gioacchini 22', 26'; Soto 83', 90+1'; Lletget 87'	Report	Fajardo 8', 79'	Stadium: Stadion Wiener Neustadt; Attendance: 0 Referee: Harald Lechner (Austria)

=== 2021 ===
28 January Friendly	Panama	0–0	Serbia	Panama City, Panama
19:00 UTC−5		Report		Stadium: Estadio Rommel Fernández; Referee: Ameth Ariel Sánchez Pinzón (Panama)

25 March 2022 World Cup qualification	Panama	1–0	Barbados	Santo Domingo, Dominican Republic
20:00 UTC−4	Catuy 82'	Report		Stadium: Félix Sánchez Olympic Stadium; Referee: Nima Saghafi (United States)

28 March 2022 World Cup qualification	Dominica	1–2	Panama	Santo Domingo, Dominican Republic
16:00 UTC−4	Laville 82'	Report	Thomas 28' (o.g.); Fajardo 85'	Stadium: Félix Sánchez Olympic Stadium; Attendance: 1,500; Referee: Marco Antonio Ortíz Nava (Mexico)

5 June 2022 World Cup qualification	Anguilla	0–13	Panama	Panama City, Panama
19:00 UTC−5		Report	Cooper 7', 18'; Aguilar 31'; Torres 35' (pen.), 53', 70', 83' (pen.); Smith 48' (o.g.); Waterman 50'; Camargo 58'; Catuy 73'; Quintero 84'; Palacios 90'	Stadium: Estadio Nacional Rod Carew; Attendance: 5,000; Referee: Sergio Reyna (Guatemala)

8 June 2022 World Cup qualification	Panama	3–0	Dominican Republic	Panama City, Panama
20:00 UTC−5	Godoy 8'; Bárcenas 67'; Waterman 86'	Report		Stadium: Estadio Nacional Rod Carew; Attendance: 5,674; Referee: Walter López (Guatemala)

12 June 2022 World Cup qualification	Panama	2–1	Curaçao	Panama City, Panama
18:15 UTC−5	Quintero 55'; Waterman 77'	Report	Janga 87'	Stadium: Estadio Nacional Rod Carew; Attendance: 7,000; Referee: Jaime Herrera Bonilla (El Salvador)

15 June 2022 World Cup qualification	Curaçao	0–0	Panama	Willemstad, Curaçao
19:00 UTC−4		Report		Stadium: Ergilio Hato Stadium; Attendance: 2,760; Referee: Marco Ortíz (Mexico)

30 June Friendly	Mexico	3–0	Panama	Nashville, United States
19:00 UTC−5	Lainez 21'; Montes 57'; Martín 90+1'	Report		Stadium: Nissan Stadium; Attendance: 30,386; Referee: Kevin Morrison (Jamaica)

13 July 2021 Gold Cup GS	Qatar	3–3	Panama	Houston, United States
19:57 UTC−5 (Note: The match, originally scheduled at 19:00 EDT (UTC−4), was delayed until 20:57 EDT due to thunderstorms in the area.)	Afif 48'; Ali 53'; Al-Haydos 63' (pen.)	Report	Blackburn 51', 58'; Davis 79' (pen.)	Stadium: BBVA Stadium; Attendance: 10,625; Referee: César Ramos (Mexico)

17 July 2021 Gold Cup GS	Panama	2–3	Honduras	Houston, United States
20:30 UTC−5	Davis 32' (pen.); Yanis 45+1'	Report	Quioto 22', 65'; López 61'	Stadium: BBVA Stadium; Attendance: 3,508; Referee: Bakary Gassama (Gambia)

20 July 2021 Gold Cup GS	Panama	3–1	Grenada	Orlando, United States
23:30 UTC−4 (Note: The match, originally scheduled at 21:30 EDT (UTC−4), was delayed until 23:30 EDT due to the weather delay in the Group C match between Costa Rica and Jamaica.)	Quintero 7'; Rodríguez 27', 64'	Report	Frank 76'	Stadium: Exploria Stadium; Attendance: 1,548; Referee: César Ramos (Mexico)

2 September 2022 World Cup qualification	Panama	0–0	Costa Rica	Panama City, Panama
20:05 UTC−5		Report		Stadium: Estadio Rommel Fernández; Attendance: 14,000; Referee: Iván Barton (El Salvador)

5 September 2022 World Cup qualification	Jamaica	0–3	Panama	Kingston, Jamaica
17:00 UTC−5		Report	Andrade 14'; Blackburn 39'; Waterman 81'	Stadium: Independence Park; Attendance: 0 Referee: Ismael Cornejo (El Salvador)

8 September 2022 World Cup qualification	Panama	1–1	Mexico	Panama City, Panama
20:05 UTC−5 (Note: The Panama v Mexico match was originally scheduled on 8 September 2021, 20:05 local time, but was rescheduled to 19:05 local time since Panama maintains a curfew which begins at 00:00 as a preventive measure against the COVID-19 pandemic.)	Blackburn 28'	Report	Corona 76'	Stadium: Estadio Rommel Fernández; Attendance: 16,000; Referee: Mario Escobar (Guatemala)

7 October 2022 World Cup qualification	El Salvador	1–0	Panama	San Salvador, El Salvador
20:05 UTC−6	Hernández 37'	Report		Stadium: Estadio Cuscatlán; Attendance: 10,000; Referee: Oshane Nation (Jamaica)

10 October 2022 World Cup qualification	Panama	1–0	United States	Panama City, Panama
17:00 UTC−5 (Note: The Panama v United States match was originally scheduled on 10 October 2021, 20:05 local time, but was rescheduled to 17:00 local time.)	Godoy 54'	Report		Stadium: Estadio Rommel Fernández; Attendance: 21,000; Referee: César Ramos (Mexico)

13 October 2022 World Cup qualification	Canada	4–1	Panama	Toronto, Canada
19:30 UTC−4	Murillo 28' (o.g.); Davies 66'; Buchanan 71'; David 78'	Report	Blackburn 5'	Stadium: BMO Field; Attendance: 26,622; Referee: Armando Villarreal (United States)

12 November 2022 World Cup qualification	Honduras	2–3	Panama	San Pedro Sula, Honduras
19:05 UTC−6	Elis 30'; Moya 59'	Report	Waterman 77'; Yanis 81'; Davis 85'	Stadium: Estadio Olímpico Metropolitano; Attendance: 10,000; Referee: Drew Fischer (Canada)

16 November 2022 World Cup qualification	Panama	2–1	El Salvador	Panama City, Panama
20:05 UTC−5	Waterman 50'; Góndola 52'	Report	Henríquez 1'	Stadium: Estadio Rommel Fernández; Attendance: 15,000; Referee: Marco Ortíz (Mexico)

=== 2022 ===
16 January Friendly	Peru	1–1	Panama	Lima, Peru
16:00 UTC−5	Valera 38'	Report	Ayarza 72'	Stadium: Estadio Nacional; Referee: Fernando Echenique (Argentina)

27 January 2022 World Cup qualification	Costa Rica	1–0	Panama	San José, Costa Rica
20:05 UTC−6	Ruiz 65'	Report		Stadium: Estadio Nacional; Attendance: 21,000; Referee: Ismail Elfath (United States)

30 January 2022 World Cup qualification	Panama	3–2	Jamaica	Panama City, Panama
17:05 UTC−5	Brown 43' (o.g.); Davis 51'; Ariano 68'	Report	Antonio 5' (pen.); Gray 87'	Stadium: Estadio Rommel Fernández; Attendance: 0 Referee: Selvin Brown (Honduras)

2 February 2022 World Cup qualification	Mexico	1–0	Panama	Mexico City, Mexico
21:00 UTC−6	Jiménez 80' (pen.)	Report		Stadium: Estadio Azteca; Attendance: 2,000; Referee: Iván Barton (El Salvador)

24 March 2022 World Cup qualification	Panama	1–1	Honduras	Panama City, Panama
20:05 UTC−5	Blackburn 23'	Report	K. López 65'	Stadium: Estadio Rommel Fernández; Referee: Ismail Elfath (United States)

27 March 2022 World Cup qualification	United States	5–1	Panama	Orlando, United States
19:00 UTC−4	Pulisic 17' (pen.), 45+4' (pen.), 65'; Arriola 23'; Ferreira 27'	Report	Godoy 86'	Stadium: Exploria Stadium; Attendance: 25,022; Referee: Iván Barton (El Salvador)

30 March 2022 World Cup qualification	Panama	1–0	Canada	Panama City, Panama
20:05 UTC−5	Torres 49'	Report		Stadium: Estadio Rommel Fernández; Referee: Jair Marrufo (United States)

1 May Friendly	El Salvador	3–2; Cancelled (Note: The El Salvador v Panama match was suspended at 3–2 in the 67th minute due to a thunderstorm in the vicinity of the stadium. The match was later cancelled and does not count for Panama's statistics.)	Panama	Cary, United States
16:30 UTC−4	Tamacas 34'; Gil 55'; Henríquez 65'	Report	Londoño 5'; Peralta 16' (pen.)	Stadium: WakeMed Soccer Park; Referee: Selvin Brown (Honduras)

2 June 2022–23 Nations League	Panama	2–0	Costa Rica	Panama City, Panama
18:30 UTC−5	Díaz 52'; Waterman 76'	Report		Stadium: Estadio Rommel Fernández; Referee: Fernando Hernández (Mexico)

9 June 2022–23 Nations League	Panama	5–0	Martinique	Panama City, Panama
19:00 UTC−5	Torres 6'; Vitulin 15' (o.g.); Escobar 56'; Bárcenas 85', 90+3'	Report		Stadium: Estadio Rommel Fernández; Referee: Ismael Cornejo (El Salvador)

11 June Friendly	Uruguay	5–0	Panama	Montevideo, Uruguay
17:00 UTC−3	Cavani 39', 48' (pen.); De la Cruz 58'; Gómez 68'; Rossi 77'	Report		Stadium: Estadio Centenario; Referee: Cristián Garay (Chile)

12 June 2022–23 Nations League	Martinique	0–0	Panama	Fort-de-France, Martinique
18:00 UTC−4		Report		Stadium: Stade Pierre-Aliker; Referee: Fernando Guerrero (Mexico)

27 September Friendly	Bahrain	0–2	Panama	Riffa, Bahrain
18:30 UTC+3		Report	Murillo 18'; Díaz 46'	Stadium: Bahrain National Stadium; Referee: Faisal Nasser Al Qahtani (Saudi Arabia)

5 November Friendly	Qatar	2–1	Panama	Marbella, Spain
18:30 UTC+2	Almoez 18'; Boudiaf 23'	Report	Bárcenas 66' (pen.)	Stadium: Marbella Football Center; Referee: Jason Lee Barcelo (Gibraltar)

10 November Friendly	Panama	1–1	Saudi Arabia	Abu Dhabi, United Arab Emirates
17:00 UTC+4	Díaz 8'	Report	Asiri 37'	Stadium: Sheikh Zayed Cricket Stadium; Referee: Yahya Al Mulla (United Arab Emirates)

15 November Friendly	Venezuela	2–2	Panama	Al Hamriyah, United Arab Emirates
21:00 UTC+4	Rondón 83' (pen.); Torregrossa 90+3'	Report	Fajardo 26'; Yanis 79'	Stadium: Al Hamriya Sports Club Stadium; Referee: Sultan Mohamed Saleh (United Arab Emirates)

18 November Friendly	Cameroon	1–1	Panama	Abu Dhabi, United Arab Emirates
13:00 UTC+4	Choupo-Moting 48'	Report	M. Murillo 55'	Stadium: Mohammed bin Zayed Stadium; Attendance: 1,500; Referee: Sultan Mohamed (United Arab Emirates)

=== 2023 ===
12 March Friendly	Guatemala	1–1	Panama	San Jose, United States
16:30 UTC−7	Lom 85' (pen.)	Report	Harvey 30'	Stadium: PayPal Park; Attendance: 5,000; Referee: Nima Saghafi (United States)

23 March Friendly	Argentina	2–0	Panama	Buenos Aires, Argentina
20:30 UTC−3	Almada 78'; Messi 89'	Report		Stadium: Estadio Monumental; Attendance: 83,214; Referee: Christian Ferreyra (Uruguay)

28 March 2022–23 Nations League	Costa Rica	0–1	Panama	San José, Costa Rica
20:00 UTC−6		Report	Fajardo 77'	Stadium: Estadio Nacional; Referee: César Ramos (Mexico)

10 June Friendly	Panama	3–2	Nicaragua	Penonomé, Panama
19:00 UTC−5	M. Murillo 55', 81'; Miller 84'	Report	Talavera 44'; Acevedo 62'	Stadium: Estadio Universidad Latina; Referee: David Gómez (Costa Rica)

15 June 2022–23 Nations League SF	Panama	0–2	Canada	Paradise, United States
16:00 UTC−7		Report	David 25'; Davies 69'	Stadium: Allegiant Stadium; Attendance: 65,000; Referee: Juan Gabriel Calderón (Costa Rica)

18 June 2022–23 Nations League 3rd	Mexico	1–0	Panama	Paradise, United States
15:00 UTC−7	Gallardo 4'	Report		Stadium: Allegiant Stadium; Attendance: 35,000; Referee: Daneon Parchment (Jamaica)

26 June 2023 Gold Cup GS	Costa Rica	1–2	Panama	Fort Lauderdale, United States
20:30 UTC−4	Suárez 90+1'	Report	Fajardo 23'; Bárcenas 68'	Stadium: DRV PNK Stadium; Attendance: 10,101; Referee: Drew Fischer (Canada)

30 June 2023 Gold Cup GS	Martinique	1–2	Panama	Harrison, United States
18:30 UTC−4	Fabien 90+5'	Report	Fajardo 57'; Murillo 70'	Stadium: Red Bull Arena; Attendance: 22,615; Referee: Saíd Martínez (Honduras)

4 July 2023 Gold Cup GS	Panama	2–2	El Salvador	Houston, United States
19:30 UTC−5	Escobar 26'; Díaz 71'	Report	B. Gil 4'; M. Gil 90+1'	Stadium: Shell Energy Stadium; Attendance: 20,002; Referee: Walter López (Guatemala)

8 July 2023 Gold Cup QF	Panama	4–0	Qatar	Arlington, United States
18:00 UTC−5	Bárcenas 19'; Díaz 56', 63', 65'	Report		Stadium: AT&T Stadium; Attendance: 60,355; Referee: César Ramos (Mexico)

12 July 2023 Gold Cup SF	United States	1–1 (4–5 p)	Panama	San Diego, United States
16:30 UTC−7	Ferreira 105'	Report	I. Anderson 99'	Stadium: Snapdragon Stadium; Attendance: 31,690; Referee: Walter López (Guatemala)
	Penalties
	Ferreira (penalty missed); Mihailovic (penalty scored); Morris (penalty scored); Gressel (penalty scored); Miazga (penalty scored); Roldan (penalty missed)		(penalty scored) Escobar; (penalty scored) Díaz; (penalty missed) Martínez; (penalty scored) Bárcenas; (penalty scored) Waterman; (penalty scored) Carrasquilla

16 July 2023 Gold Cup F	Mexico	1–0	Panama	Inglewood, United States
16:30 UTC−7	Giménez 88'	Report		Stadium: SoFi Stadium; Attendance: 72,963; Referee: Said Martínez (Honduras)

27 August Friendly	Bolivia	1–2	Panama	Cochabamba, Bolivia
16:00 UTC−4	Ursino 52'	Report	Lenis 12', 87'	Stadium: Estadio Félix Capriles; Referee: Pablo Echavarría (Argentina)

7 September 2023–24 Nations League	Panama	3–0	Martinique	Panama City, Panama
19:00 UTC−5	Fajardo 9'; Díaz 47'; Waterman 90+3'	Report		Stadium: Estadio Rommel Fernández; Attendance: 3,145; Referee: Marco Ortiz (Mexico)

10 September 2023–24 Nations League	Guatemala	1–1	Panama	Guatemala City, Guatemala
18:00 UTC−6	Santis 71'	Report	Davis 7' (pen.)	Stadium: Estadio Doroteo Guamuch Flores; Attendance: 18,313; Referee: Saíd Martínez (Honduras)

13 October 2023–24 Nations League	Curaçao	1–2	Panama	Willemstad, Curaçao
17:00 UTC−4	Janga 90+4'	Report	Bárcenas 29'; Rodríguez 77'	Stadium: Ergilio Hato Stadium; Referee: Ismail Elfath (United States)

17 October 2023–24 Nations League	Panama	3–0	Guatemala	Panama City, Panama
20:00 UTC−5	Carrasquilla 14'; Davis 48' (pen.); Ayarza 90'	Report		Stadium: Estadio Rommel Fernández; Referee: Armando Villarreal (United States)

16 November 2023–24 Nations League QF	Costa Rica	0–3	Panama	San José, Costa Rica
21:00 UTC−6		Report	Murillo 4'; Fajardo 29'; Waterman 60'	Stadium: Estadio Ricardo Saprissa Aymá; Attendance: 17,787; Referee: Mario Escobar (Guatemala)

20 November 2023–24 Nations League QF	Panama	3–1 (6–1 agg.)	Costa Rica	Panama City, Panama
21:00 UTC−5	Fajardo 20'; Rodríguez 23'; Bárcenas 43' (pen.)	Report	Calvo 51'	Stadium: Estadio Rommel Fernández; Attendance: 15,288; Referee: Saíd Martínez (Honduras)

=== 2024 ===
21 March 2023–24 Nations League SF	Panama	0–3	Mexico	Arlington, United States
21:15 UTC−5		Report	Álvarez 40'; Quiñones 43'; Pineda 67'	Stadium: AT&T Stadium; Attendance: 40,926; Referee: Walter López (Guatemala)

24 March 2023–24 Nations League 3rd	Panama	0–1	Jamaica	Arlington, United States
17:00 UTC−5		Report	Lembikisa 42'	Stadium: AT&T Stadium; Referee: Tori Penso (United States)

6 June 2026 World Cup qualification	Panama	2–0	Guyana	Panama City, Panama
19:30 UTC−5	Martínez 62'; Rodríguez 65'	Report		Stadium: Estadio Rommel Fernández; Attendance: 8,575; Referee: Filiberto Martinez (El Salvador)

9 June 2026 World Cup qualification	Montserrat	1–3	Panama	Managua, Nicaragua
19:00 UTC−6	Simon 48'	Report	Welch 40'; Fajardo 61'; Rodríguez 70'	Stadium: Estadio Nacional; Attendance: 155; Referee: Ismael Cornejo (El Salvador)

16 June Friendly	Panama	0–1	Paraguay	Panama City, Panama
17:30 UTC−5		Report	Velázquez 25'	Stadium: Estadio Rommel Fernández; Referee: David Gómez (Costa Rica)

23 June 2024 Copa América GS	Uruguay	3–1	Panama	Miami Gardens, United States
21:00 UTC−4	M. Araújo 16'; Núñez 85'; Viña 90+1'	Report	Murillo 90+4'	Stadium: Hard Rock Stadium; Attendance: 33,425; Referee: Piero Maza (Chile)

27 June 2024 Copa América GS	Panama	2–1	United States	Atlanta, United States
18:00 UTC−4	Blackman 26'; Fajardo 83'	Report	Balogun 22'	Stadium: Mercedes-Benz Stadium; Attendance: 59,145; Referee: Iván Barton (El Salvador)

1 July 2024 Copa América GS	Bolivia	1–3	Panama	Orlando, United States
21:00 UTC−4	Miranda 69'	Report	Fajardo 22'; Guerrero 79'; Yanis 90+1'	Stadium: Inter&Co Stadium; Attendance: 16,129; Referee: Edina Alves (Brazil)

6 July 2024 Copa América QF	Colombia	5–0	Panama	Glendale, United States
15:00 UTC−7	Córdoba 8'; Rodríguez 15' (pen.); Díaz 41'; Ríos 70'; Borja 90+4' (pen.)	Report		Stadium: State Farm Stadium; Attendance: 39,740; Referee: Maurizio Mariani (Italy)

12 October Friendly	United States	2–0	Panama	Austin, United States
20:00 UTC−5	Musah 49'; Pepi 90+4'	Report		Stadium: Q2 Stadium; Attendance: 20,239; Referee: Katia García (Mexico)

15 October Friendly	Canada	2–1	Panama	Toronto, Canada
19:30 UTC−4	Larin 44'; David 87'	Report	Fajardo 69'	Stadium: BMO Field; Attendance: 23,315; Referee: Tori Penso (United States)

14 November 2024–25 Nations League QF	Costa Rica	0–1	Panama	San José, Costa Rica
20:00 UTC−6		Report	Fajardo 66' (pen.)	Stadium: Estadio Nacional; Attendance: 29,201; Referee: Saíd Martínez (Honduras)

18 November 2024–25 Nations League QF	Panama	2–2 (3–2 agg.)	Costa Rica	Panama City, Panama
21:00 UTC−5	Blackman 13'; Rodríguez 45+3'	Report	Bran 24'; Martínez 72'	Stadium: Estadio Rommel Fernández; Attendance: 21,249; Referee: César Ramos (Mexico)
Note: Panama won 3–2 on aggregate, advanced to the Finals and qualified for the 2025 Gold Cup. Costa Rica advanced to the 2025 Gold Cup qualification.

=== 2025 ===
8 February Friendly	Chile	6–1	Panama	Santiago, Chile
20:30 UTC−3	Guerra 2', 25', 42'; Uribe 5'; Cepeda 53'; Pino 82'	Report	Waterman 30' (pen.)	Stadium: Estadio Nacional Julio Martínez Prádanos; Attendance: 24,500; Referee: Darío Herrera (Argentina)

20 March 2025 Nations League SF	United States	0–1	Panama	Inglewood, United States
16:00 UTC−7		Report	Waterman 90+4'	Stadium: SoFi Stadium; Referee: Oshane Nation (Jamaica)

23 March 2025 Nations League F	Mexico	2–1	Panama	Inglewood, United States
18:30 UTC−7	Jiménez 8', 90+2' (pen.)	Report	Carrasquilla 45+2' (pen.)	Stadium: SoFi Stadium; Attendance: 68,212; Referee: Mario Escobar (Guatemala)

7 June 2026 World Cup qualification	Belize	0–2	Panama	Belmopan, Belize
19:00 UTC−6		Report	Escobar 10'; Guerrero 50'	Stadium: FFB Field; Referee: Julio Luna (Guatemala)

10 June 2026 World Cup qualification	Panama	3–0	Nicaragua	Panama City, Panama
19:00 UTC−5	Yanis 56'; Díaz 88'; Davis 90+3'	Report		Stadium: Estadio Rommel Fernández; Referee: Ismael López (Mexico)

16 June 2025 Gold Cup GS	Panama	5–2	Guadeloupe	Carson, United States
16:00 UTC−7	Martínez 6'; Díaz 13', 17'; Guerrero 22' (pen.); T. Rodríguez 90+2'	Report	Leborgne 29'; David 71' (pen.)	Stadium: Dignity Health Sports Park; Attendance: 18,262; Referee: Keylor Herrera (Costa Rica)

20 June 2025 Gold Cup GS	Guatemala	0–1	Panama	Austin, United States
21:00 UTC−5		Report	T. Rodríguez 19'	Stadium: Q2 Stadium; Attendance: 12,829; Referee: Adonai Escobedo (Mexico)

24 June 2025 Gold Cup GS	Panama	4–1	Jamaica	Austin, United States
18:00 UTC−5	Díaz 4', 17', 45' (pen.); T. Rodríguez 89'	Report	Bell 27'	Stadium: Q2 Stadium; Attendance: 3,283; Referee: Selvin Brown (Honduras)

28 June 2025 Gold Cup QF	Panama	1–1 (4–5 p)	Honduras	Glendale, United States
16:15 UTC−7	Díaz 45+1' (pen.)	Report	Lozano 82'	Stadium: State Farm Stadium; Attendance: 45,255; Referee: Katia García (Mexico)
	Penalties
	Escobar (penalty scored); Díaz (penalty scored); Godoy (penalty missed); Harvey (penalty scored); Davis (penalty scored); Guerrero (penalty missed)		(penalty scored) Palma; (penalty scored) Arriaga; (penalty scored) Rosales; (penalty scored) Maldonado; (penalty missed) Lozano; (penalty scored) Pineda

4 September 2026 World Cup qualification	Suriname	0–0	Panama	Paramaribo, Suriname
18:30 UTC−3		Report		Stadium: Franklin Essed Stadion; Attendance: 2,685; Referee: Kwinsi Williams (Trinidad and Tobago)

8 September 2026 World Cup qualification	Panama	1–1	Guatemala	Panama City, Panama
20:30 UTC−5	Harvey 37'	Report	Santis 35'	Stadium: Estadio Rommel Fernández; Referee: Saíd Martínez (Honduras)

10 October 2026 World Cup qualification	El Salvador	0–1	Panama	San Salvador, El Salvador
19:00 UTC−6		Report	Fajardo 55'	Stadium: Estadio Cuscatlán; Referee: Drew Fischer (Canada)

14 October 2026 World Cup qualification	Panama	1–1	Suriname	Panama City, Panama
20:00 UTC−5	Díaz 90+6'	Report	Margaret 21'	Stadium: Estadio Rommel Fernández; Referee: Selvin Brown (Honduras)

13 November 2026 World Cup qualification	Guatemala	2–3	Panama	Guatemala City, Guatemala
20:00 UTC−6	Ordóñez 69'; Muñoz 72'		Waterman 30', 44'; Fajardo 78'	Stadium: Estadio Manuel Felipe Carrera; Referee: César Arturo Ramos (Mexico)

18 November 2026 World Cup qualification	Panama	3–0	El Salvador	Panama City, Panama
20:00 UTC−5	Blackman 17'; Davis 45+4' (pen.); Rodríguez 85'	Report		Stadium: Estadio Rommel Fernández; Referee: Saíd Martínez (Honduras)

=== 2026 ===
18 January Friendly	Bolivia	1–1	Panama	Tarija, Bolivia
17:00 UTC−4	Roberts 69' (o.g.)	Report	Barría 5'	Stadium: Estadio IV Centenario; Attendance: 12,000; Referee: Bruno Arleu de Araújo (Brazil)

22 January Friendly	Panama	0–1	Mexico	Panama City, Panama
20:00 UTC−5		Report	Peralta 90+3' (o.g.)	Stadium: Estadio Rommel Fernández; Attendance: 16,447; Referee: Guido Gonzales Jr. (United States)

27 March Friendly	South Africa	1–1	Panama	Durban, South Africa
19:00 UTC+2	Appollis 48'	Report	Bárcenas 23'	Stadium: Moses Mabhida Stadium; Referee: Thabang Ketshabile (Botswana)

31 March Friendly	South Africa	1–2	Panama	Cape Town, South Africa
19:30 UTC+2	Mbokazi 64'	Report	Córdoba 58'; Ramos 77'	Stadium: Cape Town Stadium; Referee: Thabang Ketshabile (Botswana)

31 May Friendly	Brazil	6–2	Panama	Rio de Janeiro, Brazil
18:30 UTC−4	Vinicius Jr. 2'; Casemiro 39'; Rayan 53'; Paquetá 60'; Thiago 63' (pen.); Danilo 81'	Report	Cunha 14' (o.g.); Harvey 83'	Stadium: Maracanã; Attendance: 72,140; Referee: Daniel Schlager (Germany)

3 June Friendly	Panama	4–2	Dominican Republic	Panama City, Panama
19:45 UTC−5	Rodríguez 16'; Griffith 44'; Waterman 57'; Barría 89'	Report	Díaz 47'; Japa 67'	Stadium: Estadio Rommel Fernández; Referee: Nelson Salgado (Honduras)

6 June Friendly	Bosnia and Herzegovina	1–1	Panama	St. Louis, United States
14:00 UTC−5	Katić 24'	Report	Ramos 45+2'	Stadium: Energizer Park; Attendance: 20,000; Referee: Luis Enrique Santander (Mexico)

17 June 2026 World Cup GS	Ghana	1–0	Panama	Toronto, Canada
19:00 UTC−4	Yirenkyi 90+5'	Report		Stadium: BMO Field; Attendance: 42,942; Referee: Glenn Nyberg (Sweden)

23 June 2026 World Cup GS	Panama	0–1	Croatia	Toronto, Canada
19:00 UTC−4		Report	Budimir 54'	Stadium: BMO Field; Attendance: 43,036; Referee: Pierre Atcho (Gabon)

27 June 2026 World Cup GS	Panama	0–2	England	East Rutherford, United States
17:00 UTC−4		Report	Bellingham 62'; Kane 67'	Stadium: MetLife Stadium; Attendance: 80,663; Referee: Abdulrahman Al-Jassim (Qatar)

25 September Friendly	India	1–1	Panama	Bengaluru, India
19:00 UTC+5:30	Williams 41'	Report	O. Valencia 68'	Stadium: Sree Kanteerava Stadium; Attendance: 9,039; Referee: Nazmi Nasaruddin (Malaysia)

1 October 2026 Kirin Cup Soccer	Panama	1–1 (3–5 p)	New Zealand	Yokohama, Japan
15:10 UTC+9	Herbert 45+1'	Report	Stamenić 13'	Stadium: Nissan Stadium; Referee: Rubiel Vazquez (United States)
	Penalties
	Murillo (penalty scored); Harvey (penalty scored); Jiménez (penalty missed); Griffith (penalty scored)		(penalty scored) Bindon; (penalty scored) Stamenić; (penalty scored) Dyer; (penalty scored) Bayliss; (penalty scored) Boxall

5 October 2026 Kirin Cup Soccer	Ecuador	1–1 (6–7 p)	Panama	Tokyo, Japan
15:30 UTC+9	J. Angulo 58'	Report	Vergara 38'	Stadium: National Stadium; Attendance: 14,364; Referee: Kōki Nagamine (Japan)
	Penalties
	Vite (penalty scored); Valencia (penalty missed); Yeboah (penalty scored); N. Angulo (penalty scored); Arroyo (penalty scored); Pacho (penalty scored); F. Caicedo (penalty scored); J. Angulo (penalty missed)		(penalty scored) Murillo; (penalty scored) Harvey; (penalty missed) Griffith; (penalty scored) T. Rodríguez; (penalty scored) R. Mosquera; (penalty scored) Blackman; (penalty scored) Herbert; (penalty scored) D. Murillo

12 November 2026–27 Nations League QF 1st Leg	Curaçao	0–0	Panama	Willemstad, Curaçao
20:00 UTC−4		Report		Stadium: Ergilio Hato Stadium; Referee: Tori Penso (United States)

15 November 2026–27 Nations League QF 2nd Leg	Panama	2–0 (2–0 agg.)	Curaçao	Panama City, Panama
18:00 UTC−5	Fajardo 45', 51'	Report		Stadium: Estadio Rommel Fernández; Referee: Marco Ortíz (Mexico)
Note: Panama won 2–0 on aggregate, advanced to the Finals and qualified for the 2027 Gold Cup.
