= Wesley Natã =

Wesley Natã may refer to:

- Wesley Natã (footballer, born 1995), Brazilian football winger for The Cong-Viettel
- Wesley Natã (footballer, born 2008), Brazilian football forward for Fluminense
