= Ecuador national football team =

Men's association football team

Ecuador
- Nickname(s): La Tri (The Tri); La Tricolor (The Tricolours); La Selección (The Selection)
- Association: Federación Ecuatoriana de Fútbol (FEF)
- Confederation: CONMEBOL (South America)
- Head coach: Marcelo Gallardo
- Captain: Moisés Caicedo
- Most caps: Iván Hurtado (168)
- Top scorer: Enner Valencia (49)
- Home stadium: Estadio Rodrigo Paz Delgado
- FIFA code: ECU
First colours	Second colours	Third colours

FIFA ranking
- Current: 24 (18 November 2026)
- Highest: 10 (June 2013)
- Lowest: 71 (November 2017)

First international
- Bolivia 1–1 Ecuador (Bogotá, Colombia; 8 August 1938)

Biggest win
- Ecuador 6–0 Peru (Quito, Ecuador; 22 June 1975)

Biggest defeat
- Argentina 12–0 Ecuador (Montevideo, Uruguay; 22 January 1942)

World Cup
- Appearances: 5 (first in 2002)
- Best result: Round of 16 (2006)

Copa América
- Appearances: 30 (first in 1939)
- Best result: Fourth place (1959, 1993)

CONCACAF Gold Cup
- Appearances: 1 (first in 2002)
- Best result: Group stage (2002)

The Ecuador national football team (Spanish: Selección de fútbol de Ecuador), nicknamed La Tricolor and La Tri represents Ecuador in men's international football and is controlled by the Federación Ecuatoriana de Fútbol (English: Ecuadorian Football Federation). They joined FIFA in 1926 and CONMEBOL a year later.

Discarding an invitation to participate in the inaugural FIFA World Cup held in Uruguay, Ecuador did not make their tournament debut until 2002. After finishing above Brazil and Uruguay in the standings, the qualifying campaign marked the emergence of several players, such as Agustín Delgado, Álex Aguinaga, Iván Hurtado, Ulises de la Cruz and Iván Kaviedes, who would set the stage for Ecuador's achievements in the next decade. Having reached the Round of 16 in a memorable 2006 World Cup campaign, they were expected to deliver at the 2007 Copa América but were eliminated in the group stage. Along with Venezuela, they have not won the continental tournament. La Tri's best performance was fourth in 1959 and 1993, both times on home soil.

Ecuador plays the majority of their home matches at the Estadio Olímpico Atahualpa in Quito.

== History ==
Historically, Ecuador has been seen as a struggling footballing nation in South America. Despite their past failures, however, Ecuador has risen to be a serious South American competitor in recent years.

Football was introduced to Ecuador by Juan Alfredo Wright, who had recently returned from university in England. On 23 April 1899, he and his brother Roberto founded the first Ecuadorian football team, Guayaquil Sport Club. As the popularity of the sport grew in the country, more teams were established. On 30 May 1925, the Federación Deportiva Nacional del Ecuador was founded. In 1930, FIFA sent an invitation encouraging for a men's national team to participate at the maiden World Cup. However, the then-Minister of Social Security and Sports declined the offer as they did not approve of the financial allocation.

In 1938, the I Bolivarian Games were organized, with Ecuador set to take part in the football tournament. On 8 August 1938, they played their first-ever match; a 1–1 draw with Bolivia. Their following game saw the national team earn a 2–1 win against Colombia. Following a 9–1 crushing by Peru and a 5–2 victory over Venezuela, Ecuador was tied for the silver medal with Bolivia. A playoff saw the Bolivians emerge triumphantly and the Ecuadorians finished the competition with the bronze medal.

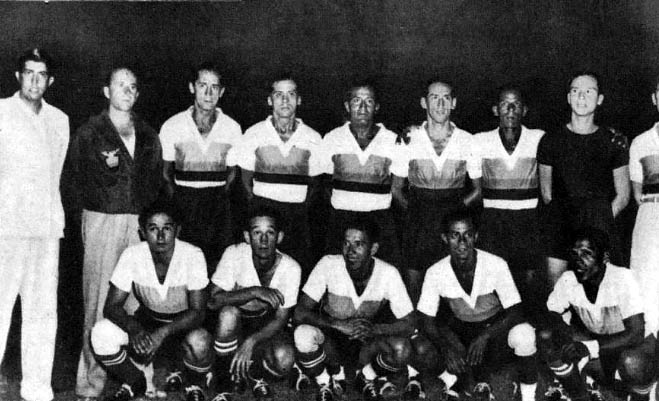
The Ecuador squad that participated at the 1942 South American Championship

After finishing fourth at the 1959 South American Championship, the team entered the World Cup qualifiers for the first time. They failed to qualify for 1962 after inflicted defeats by Argentina.

The 1998 World Cup qualifiers saw the format for qualifying in CONMEBOL changed to a league home-and-away system. This difference made a huge impact on Ecuador's performance as they clinched several important home wins during the campaign. In the end, they achieved a 6th-place finish, just under Peru and Chile.

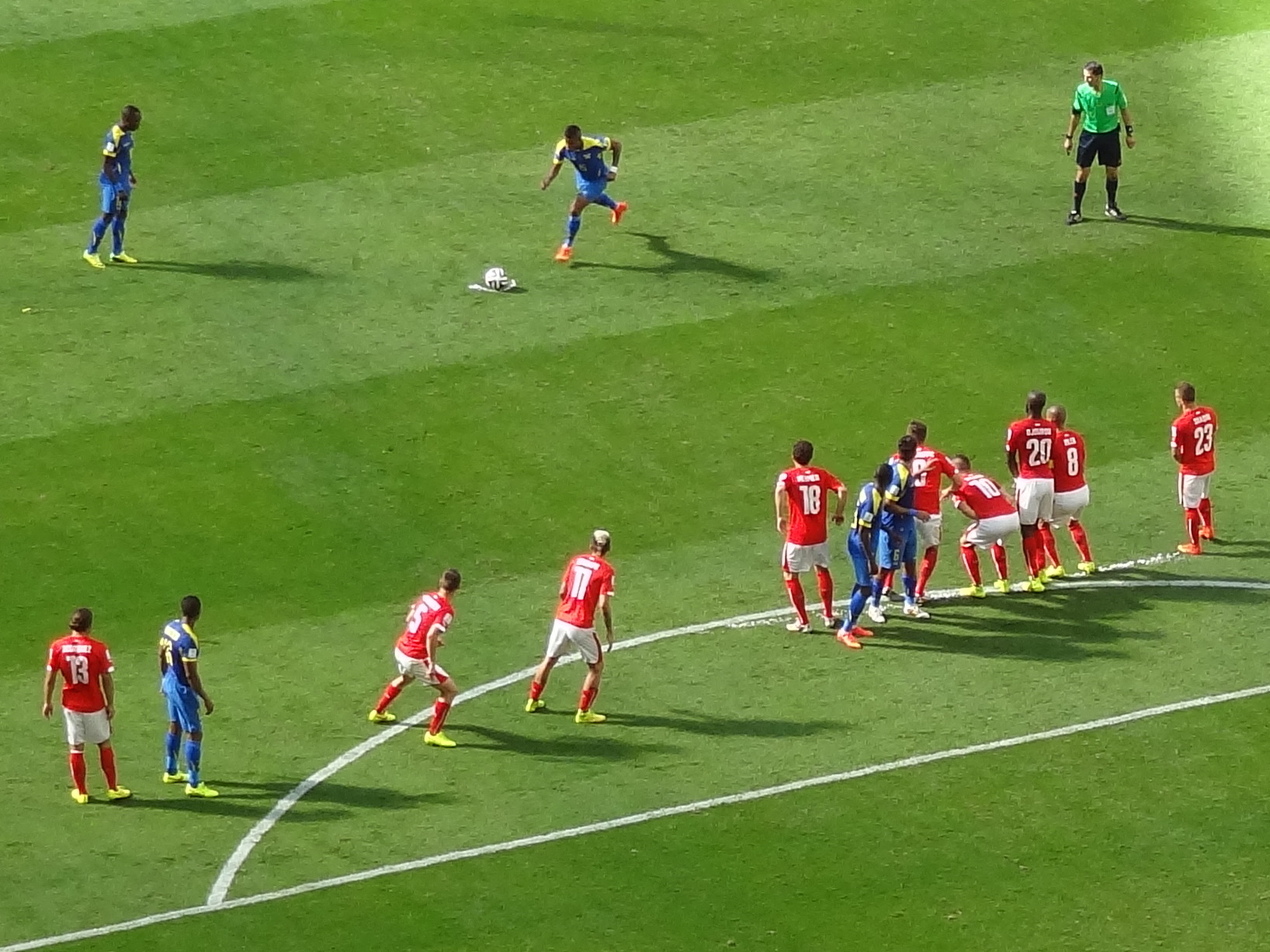
Michael Arroyo executing a free kick against Switzerland at the 2014 World Cup

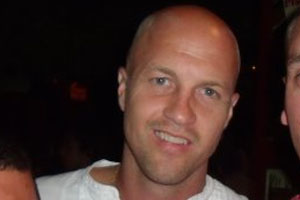
Jordi Cruijff became the manager of Ecuador in 2020

Following the appointment of Hernán Darío Gómez for their 2002 World Cup qualifying campaign, Ecuador recorded a historic 1–0 win against Brazil. A 5–1 win over Bolivia saw la Tricolor only needing a point to qualify for the World Cup. They faced Uruguay, and, after managing to cling onto a 1–1 draw, obtained their spot in the World Cup in East Asia.

Ecuador started the 2002 World Cup with a 2–0 loss to Italy. Agustín Delgado scored his country's first World Cup goal; he opened the scoring in a 2–1 loss to Mexico. Despite defeating Croatia, who had achieved third place in the previous tournament, and eliminating the Croats in process, Ecuador placed fourth in Group G and 24th overall.

A disappointing showing at the 2004 Copa América led to the resignation of Gómez, who was replaced by Luis Fernando Suárez. He led them successfully through the latter stages of the qualification process for the 2006 FIFA World Cup, finishing third to make the finals. In Germany, they were drawn into Group A with the hosts, Poland, and Costa Rica. Wins over Poland and Costa Rica earned Ecuador qualification to the knockout stages for the first time.

After a dull 2014 FIFA World Cup, and an unpleasant streak of failing to advance past the group stages of the Copa América, Gustavo Quinteros was hired to help rebuild the national team. Quinteros helped Ecuador reach the quarter-finals of the Copa América Centenario and started the 2018 World Cup qualifiers strong. They were setback after a loss to Uruguay and finished eighth in the standings.

Gómez was reinstalled to lead Ecuador at the 2019 Copa América. His second stint was short, as he was soon fired after a disastrous tournament, having only earned a point.

For the qualifying for the 2026 FIFA World Cup, as punishment for fielding the player Byron Castillo who had a passport with falsified information in the previous World Cup qualification cycle, Ecuador was deducted three points and fined CHF 100,000.

== Home stadium ==
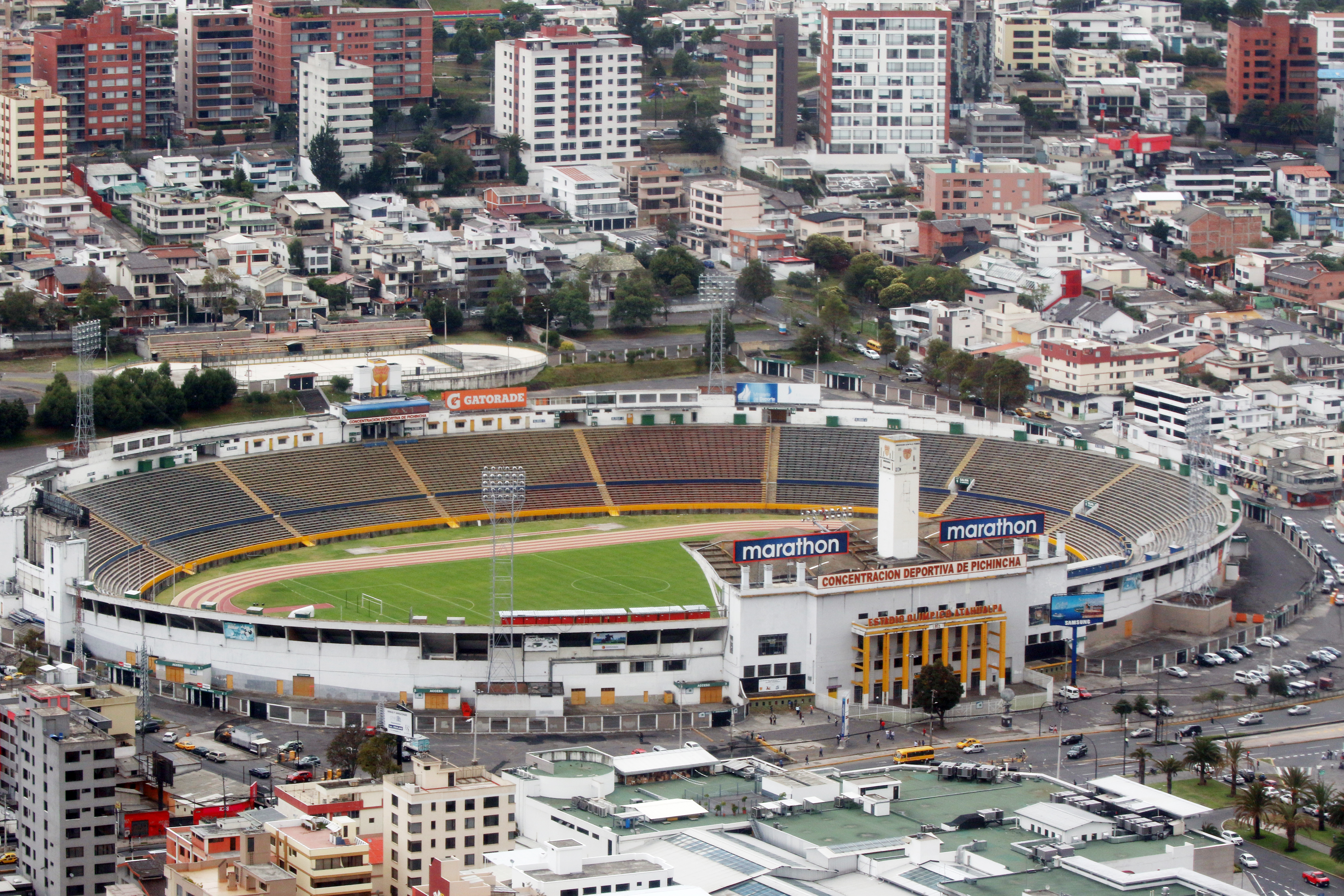
Aerial view of the stadium in 2017

The Ecuador national team plays their home games at the Estadio Olímpico Atahualpa in Quito. Having opened in 1951, it initially had a capacity of 45,000, but was later reduced to 35,724.

The stadium has a running track, which has gone to be one of the most important in South America for events organized by the former International Association of Athletics Federations.

15 gates surround the stadium, allowing for an evacuation to be completed in about 10 minutes. The venue also features an electronic scoreboard located in the northern sector. The screen, manufactured by Hungarian-based company Elektroimpex in 1985, measures 10 meters tall and 30 meters wide.

In this stadium, Ecuador defeated Uruguay at the 1993 Copa América and Brazil at the 2002 World Cup qualifiers. After tying with the former on 7 November 2001, Ecuador qualified for their first World Cup. Since then, Ecuador has qualified three times.

The stadium is set to be demolished in late-2020 for a newer stadium, which in first instance was for preparation for the 2024 Copa América. However, Ecuador declined to host Copa America in 2022.

For the 2022 FIFA World Cup qualifiers, Ecuador played at the Casa Blanca.

== Team image ==
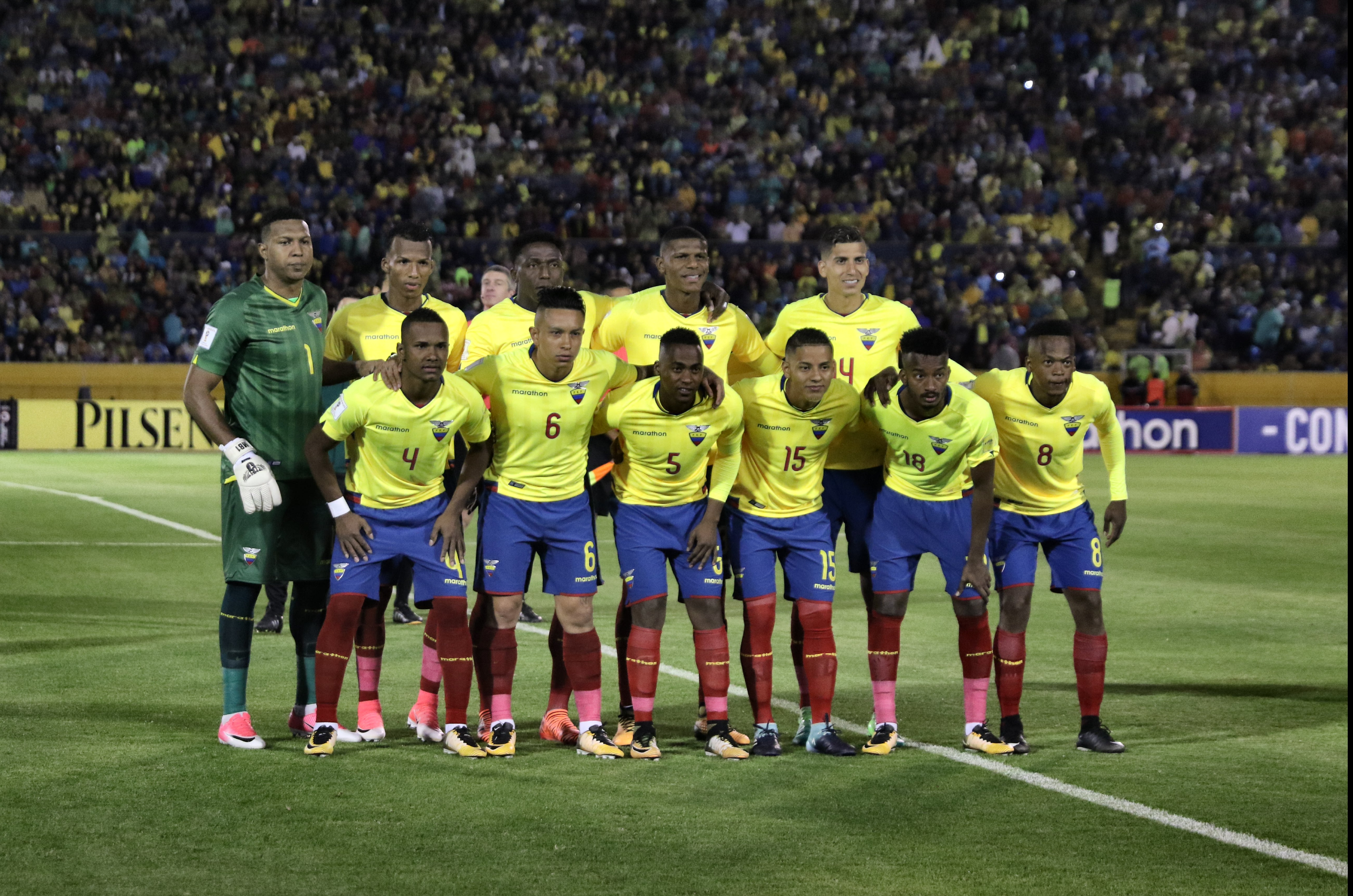
The Ecuador team posing before facing Argentina in October 2017

The standard Ecuador uniform maintains the colours of the national flag, typically a yellow top, blue shorts, and red socks. The alternate colours of the uniform are white and blue, this being based on the flag of the Guayas Province. From 1965 to 2020, the crest featured the Andean condor, Ecuador's national bird, above a shield with the country's colors. In January 2020, the Ecuadorian Football Federation announced a rebrand of the logo; a navy blue shield with an "FEF" monogram attempting to "abstractly build a condor".

=== Kit sponsorship ===
Kit supplier	Period
(West Germany) Adidas	1985
(Ecuador) Credeport	1986–1990
(Germany) Puma	1991–1992
(United States) Reebok	1993–1994
(Ecuador) Marathon	1994–present

== Results and fixtures ==
The following is a list of match results in the last 12 months, as well as any future matches that have been scheduled.

Win Draw Loss Fixture

=== 2025 ===
13 November Friendly	Canada	0–0	Ecuador	Toronto, Canada
19:30 UTC−5		Report		Stadium: BMO Field; Attendance: 28,740; Referee: Fernando Hernández (Mexico)

18 November Friendly	Ecuador	2–0	New Zealand	Harrison, United States
20:30 UTC−5	Angulo 50'; Campana 83'	Report		Stadium: Sports Illustrated Stadium; Attendance: 12,000

=== 2026 ===
27 March Friendly	Morocco	1–1	Ecuador	Madrid, Spain
20:15 UTC+1	El Aynaoui 88'	Report	Yeboah 48'	Stadium: Metropolitano Stadium; Attendance: 61,622; Referee: José Luis Munuera Montero (Spain)

31 March Friendly	Netherlands	1–1	Ecuador	Eindhoven, Netherlands
20:45 UTC+2	Pacho 3' (o.g.)	Report	E. Valencia 24' (pen.)	Stadium: Philips Stadion; Attendance: 29,344; Referee: Sascha Stegemann (Germany)

30 May Friendly	Ecuador	2–1	Saudi Arabia	Harrison, United States
19:30 UTC−4	Porozo 35'; A. Valencia 51'	Report	Mandash 87'	Stadium: Sports Illustrated Stadium; Attendance: 20,000; Referee: Pierre-Luc Lauziere (Canada)

7 June Friendly	Ecuador	3–0	Guatemala	Columbus, United States
16:00 UTC−4	J. Caicedo 19' (pen.); Angulo 73'; Estupiñán 78'	Report		Stadium: ScottsMiracle-Gro Field; Attendance: 14,000; Referee: Marco Ortíz (Mexico)

14 June 2026 FIFA World Cup GS	Ivory Coast	1–0	Ecuador	Philadelphia, United States
19:00 UTC−4	Amad 90'	Report		Stadium: Lincoln Financial Field; Attendance: 68,274; Referee: François Letexier (France)

20 June 2026 FIFA World Cup GS	Ecuador	0–0	Curaçao	Kansas City, United States
19:00 UTC−5		Report		Stadium: Arrowhead Stadium; Attendance: 68,598; Referee: Ma Ning (China)

25 June 2026 FIFA World Cup GS	Ecuador	2–1	Germany	East Rutherford, United States
16:00 UTC−4	Angulo 9'; Plata 77'	Report	Sane 2'	Stadium: MetLife Stadium; Attendance: 80,663; Referee: Tori Penso (United States)

30 June 2026 FIFA World Cup R32	Mexico	2–0	Ecuador	Mexico City, Mexico
20:00 UTC−6	Quiñones 22'; Jiménez 31'	Report		Stadium: Estadio Azteca; Attendance: 80,824; Referee: Slavko Vinčić (Slovenia)

24 September Friendly	South Korea	3–0	Ecuador	Suwon, South Korea
20:00 UTC+9	Oh Hyeon-gyu 54'; Son Heung-min 58'; Lee Dong-gyeong 86'	Report		Stadium: Suwon World Cup Stadium; Attendance: 33,953; Referee: Shen Yinhao (China)

1 October 2026 Kirin Cup Soccer	Japan	0–0 (5–4 p)	Ecuador	Yokohama, Japan
19:25 UTC+9		Report		Stadium: Nissan Stadium; Attendance: 65,012; Referee: Wiwat Jumpaoon (Thailand)
	Penalties
	Ueda (penalty scored); Kamada (penalty scored); H. Itō (penalty scored); Sōma (penalty scored); Maeda (penalty scored)		(penalty scored) J. Caicedo; (penalty scored) Minda; (penalty missed) Castillo; (penalty scored) Sarmiento; (penalty scored) Valencia

5 October 2026 Kirin Cup Soccer	Ecuador	1–1 (6–7 p)	Panama	Tokyo, Japan
15:30 UTC+9	J. Angulo 58'	Report	Vergara 38'	Stadium: National Stadium; Attendance: 14,364; Referee: Kōki Nagamine (Japan)
	Penalties
	Vite (penalty scored); Valencia (penalty missed); Yeboah (penalty scored); N. Angulo (penalty scored); Arroyo (penalty scored); Pacho (penalty scored); F. Caicedo (penalty scored); J. Angulo (penalty missed)		(penalty scored) Murillo; (penalty scored) Harvey; (penalty missed) Griffith; (penalty scored) T. Rodríguez; (penalty scored) R. Mosquera; (penalty scored) Blackman; (penalty scored) Herbert; (penalty scored) D. Murillo

13 November Friendly	Ecuador	2–0	Costa Rica	Quito, Ecuador
19:00 UTC−5	J. Caicedo 22'; M. Caicedo 83' (pen.)	Report		Stadium: Estadio Olímpico Atahualpa; Referee: Bruno Pérez (Peru)

17 November Friendly	Ecuador	2–0	Bolivia	Guayaquil, Ecuador
18:30 UTC−5	Mercado 20'; J. Caicedo 45+4'	Report		Stadium: Estadio Monumental Banco Pichincha; Referee: Kevin Ortega (Peru)

== Coaching staff ==
Position	Name
Head coach	(Argentina) Marcelo Gallardo
Assistant coach	(Argentina) Hernán Buján
Goalkeeper coach	(Argentina) Juan Carlos Docabo
Fitness coach	(Argentina) Pablo Dolce (Argentina) Diego Gamalero (Argentina) Marcelo Tulbovitz

== Coaching history ==
- (Chile) Enrique Lamas (1938)
- (Ecuador) Ramón Unamuno (1939)
- (Argentina) Juan Parodi (1941–1942)
- (Argentina) Rodolfo Orlandini (1945)
- (Ecuador) Ramón Unamuno (1947)
- (Spain) José Planas (1949)
- (Argentina) Iván Esperón (1953)
- (Ecuador) José María Díaz (1955)
- (Italy) (Argentina) Eduardo Spandre (1957)
- (Uruguay) Juan López (1959–1960)
- (Ecuador) Fausto Montalván (1963, 1966)
- (Uruguay) José María Rodríguez (1965)
- (Brazil) José Gomes Nogueira (1969)
- (Ecuador) Ernesto Guerra (1970, 1977–1979, 1983)
- (Ecuador) Jorge Lazo (1972)
- (Argentina) Roberto Resquín (1973)
- (Uruguay) Roque Máspoli (1975–1977)
- (Ecuador) Héctor Morales (1979–1980)
- (Brazil) Otto Vieira (1981)
- (Uruguay) Juan Hohberg (1981–1982)
- (Brazil) Antoninho Ferreira (1984–1985)
- (Uruguay) Luis Grimaldi (1986–1987)
- (Socialist Federal Republic of Yugoslavia) (Montenegro) Dušan Drašković (1988–1993)
- (Ecuador) Carlos Torres Garcés (1994)
- (Ecuador) Carlos Ron (1994)
- (Colombia) Francisco Maturana (1995–1997, 1997)
- (Colombia) Luis Fernando Suárez (1997, 2004–2007)
- (Ecuador) Polo Carrera (1998)
- (Ecuador) Carlos Sevilla (1999)
- (Colombia) Hernán Darío Gómez (1999–2004, 2018–2019)
- (Ecuador) Sixto Vizuete (2007–2010, 2014–2015)
- (Colombia) Reinaldo Rueda (2010–2014)
- (Argentina) (Bolivia) Gustavo Quinteros (2015–2017)
- (Argentina) Jorge Célico (2017–2018, 2019–2020)
- (Netherlands) (Spain) Jordi Cruyff (2020)
- (Argentina) Gustavo Alfaro (2020–2023)
- (Spain) Félix Sánchez (2023–2024)
- (Argentina) Sebastián Beccacece (2024–2026)
- (Argentina) Marcelo Gallardo (2026–present)

== Players ==
=== Current squad ===
The following players were called up to the squad for the friendly matches against Costa Rica and Bolivia on 13 and 17 November, respectively.

Caps and goals current as of 17 November 2026, after the match against Bolivia.

No.	Pos.	Player	Date of birth (age)	Caps	Goals	Club
1	GK	Hernán Galíndez	30 March 1987 (age 39)	43	0	(Argentine Football Association) Huracán
12	GK	Moisés Ramírez	9 September 2000 (age 26)	7	0	(Hellenic Football Federation) Kifisia
22	GK	Gonzalo Valle	28 February 1996 (age 30)	5	0	(Ecuadorian Football Federation) LDU Quito
2	DF	Félix Torres	11 January 1997 (age 29)	53	5	(Brazilian Football Confederation) Internacional
3	DF	Piero Hincapié	9 January 2002 (age 24)	58	3	(The Football Association) Arsenal
6	DF	Willian Pacho	16 October 2001 (age 25)	43	2	(French Football Federation) Paris Saint-Germain
7	DF	Pervis Estupiñán	21 January 1998 (age 28)	60	5	(Italian Football Federation) Milan
14	DF	Bryan Ramírez	11 August 2000 (age 26)	0	0	(United States Soccer Federation) Cincinnati
17	DF	Ángelo Preciado	18 February 1998 (age 28)	63	0	(Brazilian Football Confederation) Atlético Mineiro
25	DF	Jackson Porozo	4 August 2000 (age 26)	15	1	(Mexican Football Federation) Tijuana
4	MF	Óscar Zambrano	20 April 2004 (age 22)	1	0	(The Football Association) Hull City
5	MF	Jordy Alcívar	5 August 1999 (age 27)	15	1	(Ecuadorian Football Federation) Independiente del Valle
8	MF	Anthony Valencia	21 July 2003 (age 23)	7	1	(Brazilian Football Confederation) Flamengo
13	MF	Kendry Páez	4 May 2007 (age 19)	28	2	(The Football Association) Chelsea U21
15	MF	Pedro Vite	9 March 2002 (age 24)	26	1	(Mexican Football Federation) UNAM
16	MF	Jeremy Sarmiento	16 June 2002 (age 24)	27	2	(The Football Association) Middlesbrough
21	MF	Martín Tello	16 September 2004 (age 22)	0	0	(Ecuadorian Football Federation) Macará
23	MF	Moisés Caicedo	2 November 2001 (age 25)	67	3	(The Football Association) Chelsea
9	FW	Jordy Caicedo	18 November 1997 (age 29)	28	5	(Argentine Football Association) Huracán
10	FW	John Yeboah	23 June 2000 (age 26)	32	3	(Italian Football Federation) Venezia
11	FW	Kevin Rodríguez	4 March 2000 (age 26)	37	2	(Royal Belgian Football Association) Union Saint-Gilloise
18	FW	John Mercado	3 June 2002 (age 24)	12	1	(Football Association of the Czech Republic) Sparta Prague
19	FW	Juan Riquelme Angulo	12 January 2008 (age 18)	4	1	(The Football Association) Sunderland
20	FW	Nilson Angulo	19 June 2003 (age 23)	22	3	(The Football Association) Sunderland
24	FW	Keny Arroyo	14 February 2006 (age 20)	7	0	(Brazilian Football Confederation) Cruzeiro
26	FW	Snayder Porozo	12 May 2007 (age 19)	0	0	(Royal Belgian Football Association) Antwerp

=== Recent call-ups ===
The following players have been called up during the last twelve months.

Pos.	Player	Date of birth (age)	Caps	Goals	Club	Latest call-up
GK	Cristhian Loor	9 March 2006 (age 20)	0	0	(Brazil) Botafogo	v. Saudi Arabia, 31 May 2026
GK	David Cabezas	12 June 1995 (age 31)	1	0	(Ecuador) Libertad	v. Netherlands, 31 March 2026
DF	José Hurtado	23 December 2001 (age 24)	11	0	(Brazil) Red Bull Bragantino	v. Panama, 5 October 2026
DF	Leonardo Realpe	26 February 2001 (age 25)	4	0	(Portugal) Famalicão	v. Panama, 5 October 2026
DF	Fricio Caicedo	17 April 2008 (age 18)	2	0	(United States) Inter Miami	v. Panama, 5 October 2026
DF	Deinner Ordóñez ^{TRP}	29 October 2009 (age 17)	0	0	(Ecuador) Independiente del Valle	v. Panama, 5 October 2026
DF	Joel Ordóñez	21 April 2004 (age 22)	20	0	(Belgium) Club Brugge	2026 FIFA World Cup
MF	Alan Franco	21 August 1998 (age 28)	64	1	(Brazil) Atlético Mineiro	v. Costa Rica, 13 November 2026 ^{INJ}
MF	Denil Castillo	24 March 2004 (age 22)	7	0	(Denmark) Midtjylland	v. Costa Rica, 13 November 2026 ^{INJ}
MF	Yaimar Medina	5 November 2004 (age 22)	7	0	(Belgium) Genk	2026 FIFA World Cup
MF	Darwin Guagua	6 November 2007 (age 19)	2	0	(Spain) Mérida	v. Saudi Arabia, 31 May 2026
MF	Bruno Caicedo	15 January 2005 (age 21)	0	0	(Canada) Vancouver Whitecaps	v. Saudi Arabia, 31 May 2026
MF	Ederson Castillo	10 December 2008 (age 17)	0	0	(Ecuador) LDU Quito	v. Saudi Arabia, 31 May 2026
MF	Malcom Dacosta	17 April 2008 (age 18)	0	0	(England) Bournemouth U21	v. Saudi Arabia, 31 May 2026
MF	Luis Fragozo	8 April 2010 (age 16)	0	0	(Ecuador) Emelec	v. Saudi Arabia, 31 May 2026
MF	Patrik Mercado	31 July 2003 (age 23)	3	0	(Ecuador) Independiente del Valle	v. Morocco, 27 March 2026 ^{INJ}
FW	Gonzalo Plata	1 November 2000 (age 26)	55	9	(Brazil) Flamengo	v. Bolivia, 17 November 2026 ^{WD}
FW	Alan Minda	14 May 2003 (age 23)	24	2	(Brazil) Atlético Mineiro	v. Costa Rica, 13 November 2026 ^{INJ}
FW	Enner Valencia (captain)	4 November 1989 (age 37)	109	49	(Argentina) Boca Juniors	2026 FIFA World Cup
FW	Jeremy Arévalo	19 March 2005 (age 21)	4	0	(Portugal) Estrela Amadora	2026 FIFA World Cup
FW	Janner Corozo	8 September 1995 (age 31)	7	1	(Ecuador) LDU Quito	v. Netherlands, 31 March 2026
FW	Elías Legendre	22 April 2008 (age 18)	0	0	(France) Rennes	v. Netherlands, 31 March 2026
FW	Leonardo Campana	24 July 2000 (age 26)	20	1	(United States) New England Revolution	v. Morocco, 27 March 2026 ^{INJ}
^{INJ} Withdrew from the squad due to injury.^{PRE} Preliminary squad / standby.^{RET} Retired from the national team.^{SUS} Withdrew from the squad due to suspension.^{WD} Withdrew from the squad for non-injury related reasons.^{TRP} Invited as a training player.

=== Retired numbers ===
Following the death of Christian Benítez, the Ecuadorian Football Federation retired his jersey number 11 from the national team. According to the Federation's then-president, Luis Chiriboga, to honor Benítez the number would no longer be used by any other team player. However, due to FIFA regulations, the number had to be reinstated for the 2014 World Cup squad, taken by Felipe Caicedo.

== Player records ==
As of 30 June 2026.
Players in bold are still active with Ecuador.

=== Most appearances ===
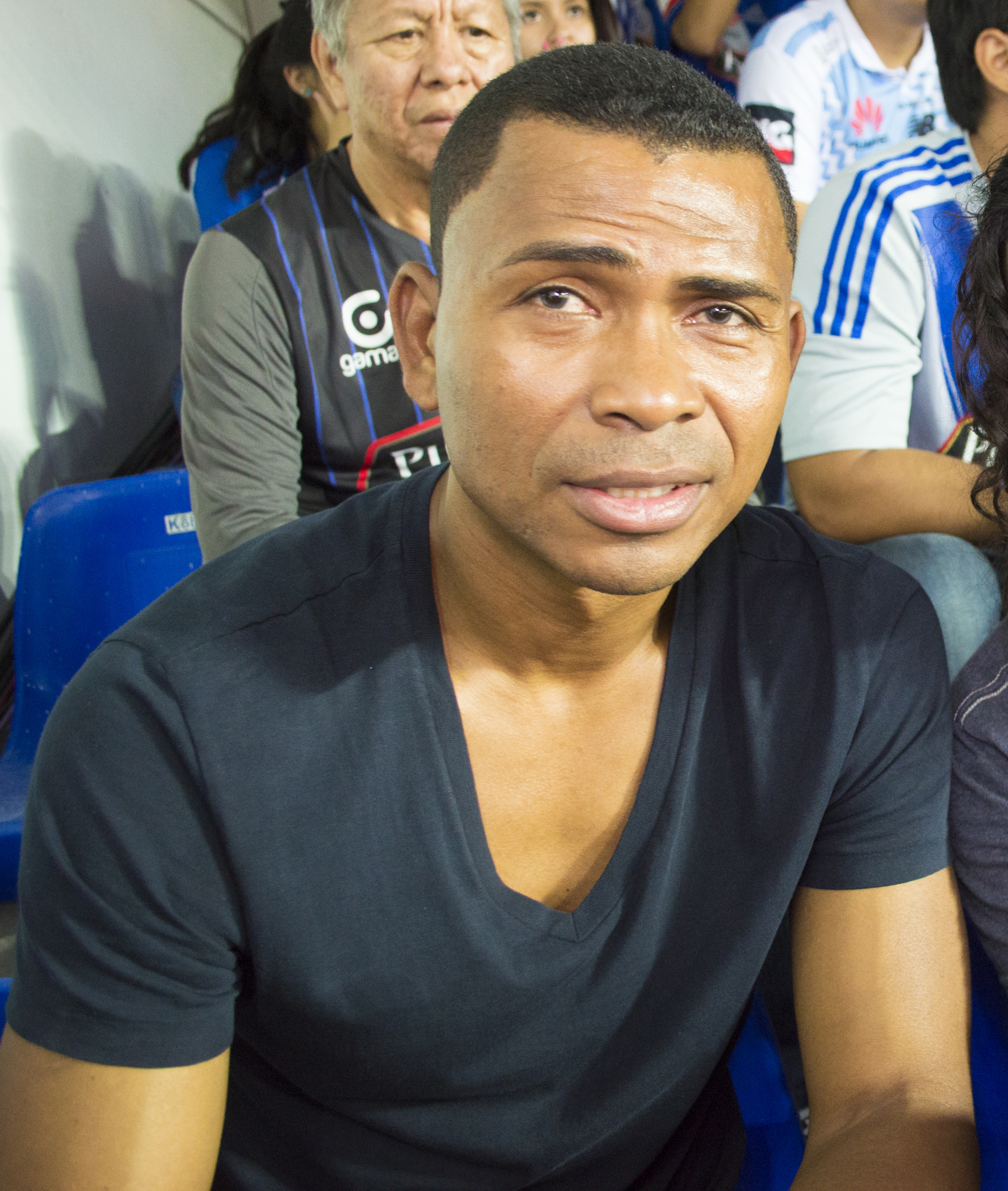
Iván Hurtado is Ecuador's most capped player, with 168 appearances.

Rank	Player	Caps	Goals	Ecuador career
1	Iván Hurtado	168	4	1992–2014
2	Walter Ayoví	121	8	2001–2017
3	Édison Méndez	111	18	2000–2014
4	Enner Valencia	109	49	2012–2026
4	Álex Aguinaga	109	23	1987–2004
6	Ulises de la Cruz	101	6	1995–2010
7	Luis Capurro	100	1	1985–2003
8	Antonio Valencia	99	11	2004–2019
9	Giovanny Espinoza	90	3	2000–2009
10	Segundo Castillo	88	9	2003–2016
10	José Francisco Cevallos	88	0	1994–2010

=== Top goalscorers ===
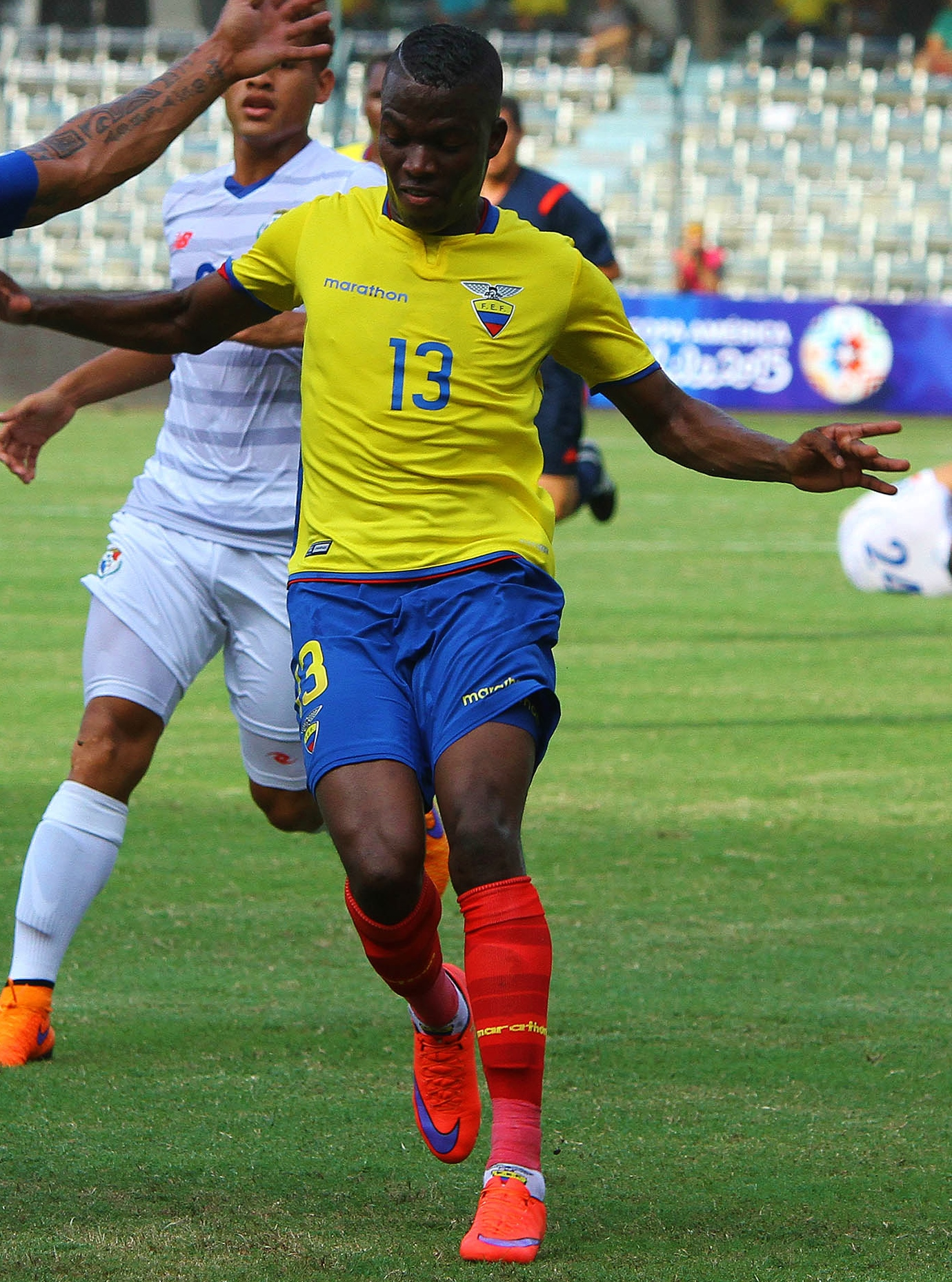
Enner Valencia is Ecuador's top scorer with 49 goals.

Rank	Player	Goals	Caps	Ratio	Ecuador career
1	Enner Valencia	49	109	0.45	2012–2026
2	Agustín Delgado	31	72	0.44	1994–2011
3	Eduardo Hurtado	26	74	0.35	1992–2002
4	Christian Benítez	25	61	0.41	2005–2013
5	Álex Aguinaga	23	109	0.21	1987–2004
6	Felipe Caicedo	22	68	0.32	2005–2017
7	Édison Méndez	18	111	0.16	2000–2014
8	Raúl Avilés	16	55	0.29	1987–1993
8	Iván Kaviedes	16	57	0.28	1996–2012
10	Ariel Graziani	15	34	0.44	1997–2000

== Competitive record ==
=== FIFA World Cup ===
FIFA World Cup record										Qualification record					
Year	Round	Position	Pld	W	D	L	GF	GA	Squad	Pld	W	D	L	GF	GA
(Uruguay) 1930	Did not enter									Declined invitation					
(Italy) 1934	Did not enter									Did not enter					
(France) 1938	Did not enter									Did not enter					
(Brazil) 1950	Withdrew									Withdrew					
(Switzerland) 1954	Did not enter									Did not enter					
(Sweden) 1958	Did not enter									Did not enter					
(Chile) 1962	Did not qualify									2	0	0	2	3	11
(England) 1966	Did not qualify									5	2	1	2	7	7
(Mexico) 1970	Did not qualify									4	0	1	3	2	8
(West Germany) 1974	Did not qualify									4	0	2	2	3	8
(Argentina) 1978	Did not qualify									4	0	1	3	1	9
(Spain) 1982	Did not qualify									4	1	1	2	2	5
(Mexico) 1986	Did not qualify									4	0	1	3	4	11
(Italy) 1990	Did not qualify									4	1	1	2	4	5
(United States) 1994	Did not qualify									8	1	3	4	7	7
(France) 1998	Did not qualify									16	6	3	7	22	21
(South Korea) (Japan) 2002	Group stage	24th	3	1	0	2	2	4	Squad	18	9	4	5	23	20
(Germany) 2006	Round of 16	12th	4	2	0	2	5	4	Squad	18	8	4	6	23	19
(South Africa) 2010	Did not qualify									18	6	5	7	22	26
(Brazil) 2014	Group stage	17th	3	1	1	1	3	3	Squad	16	7	4	5	20	16
(Russia) 2018	Did not qualify									18	6	2	10	26	29
(Qatar) 2022	Group stage	18th	3	1	1	1	4	3	Squad	18	7	5	6	27	19
(Canada) (Mexico) (United States) 2026	Round of 32	25th	4	1	1	2	2	4	Squad	18	8	8	2	14	5
(Morocco) (Portugal) (Spain) 2030	To be determined									To be determined					
(Saudi Arabia) 2034	To be determined									To be determined					
Total	Round of 16	5/23	17	6	3	8	16	18	—	179	62	46	71	210	226

=== Copa América ===
Champions Runners-up Third place Fourth place

South American Championship / Copa América record
Year	Round	Position	Pld	W	D	L	GF	GA	Squad
(Argentina) 1916	No national representative								
(Uruguay) 1917	No national representative								
(Brazil) 1919	No national representative								
(Chile) 1920	No national representative								
(Argentina) 1921	No national representative								
(Brazil) 1922	No national representative								
(Uruguay) 1923	No national representative								
(Uruguay) 1924	No national representative								
(Argentina) 1925	Not a CONMEBOL member								
(Chile) 1926	Not a CONMEBOL member								
(Peru) 1927	Did not participate								
(Argentina) 1929	Did not participate								
(Peru) 1935	Did not participate								
(Argentina) 1937	Did not participate								
(Peru) 1939	Fifth place	5th	4	0	0	4	4	18	Squad
(Chile) 1941	Fifth place	5th	4	0	0	4	1	21	Squad
(Uruguay) 1942	Seventh place	7th	6	0	0	6	4	31	Squad
(Chile) 1945	Seventh place	7th	6	0	1	5	9	27	Squad
(Argentina) 1946	Withdrew								
(Ecuador) 1947	Sixth place	6th	7	0	3	4	3	17	Squad
(Brazil) 1949	Seventh place	7th	7	1	0	6	7	21	Squad
(Peru) 1953	Seventh place	7th	6	0	2	4	1	13	Squad
(Chile) 1955	Sixth place	6th	5	0	0	5	4	22	Squad
(Uruguay) 1956	Withdrew								
(Peru) 1957	Seventh place	7th	6	0	1	5	7	23	Squad
(Argentina) 1959	Withdrew								
(Ecuador) 1959	Fourth place	4th	4	1	1	2	5	9	Squad
(Bolivia) 1963	Sixth place	6th	6	1	2	3	14	18	Squad
(Uruguay) 1967	Did not qualify								
1975	Group stage	9th	4	0	1	3	4	10	Squad
1979	Group stage	9th	4	1	0	3	4	7	Squad
1983	Group stage	9th	4	0	2	2	4	10	Squad
(Argentina) 1987	Group stage	8th	2	0	1	1	1	4	Squad
(Brazil) 1989	Group stage	7th	4	1	2	1	2	2	Squad
(Chile) 1991	Group stage	7th	4	1	1	2	6	5	Squad
(Ecuador) 1993	Fourth place	4th	6	4	0	2	13	5	Squad
(Uruguay) 1995	Group stage	9th	3	1	0	2	2	3	Squad
(Bolivia) 1997	Quarter-finals	5th	4	2	2	0	5	2	Squad
(Paraguay) 1999	Group stage	11th	3	0	0	3	3	7	Squad
(Colombia) 2001	Group stage	9th	3	1	0	2	5	5	Squad
(Peru) 2004	Group stage	12th	3	0	0	3	3	10	Squad
(Venezuela) 2007	Group stage	11th	3	0	0	3	3	6	Squad
(Argentina) 2011	Group stage	10th	3	0	1	2	2	5	Squad
(Chile) 2015	Group stage	10th	3	1	0	2	4	6	Squad
(United States) 2016	Quarter-finals	8th	4	1	2	1	7	4	Squad
(Brazil) 2019	Group stage	11th	3	0	1	2	2	7	Squad
(Brazil) 2021	Quarter-finals	8th	5	0	3	2	5	9	Squad
(United States) 2024	Quarter-finals	8th	4	1	2	1	5	4	Squad
Total	Fourth place	30/38	130	17	28	85	139	331	—

=== Pan American Games ===
Pan American Games record
Year	Round	Position	Pld	W	D	L	GF	GA
(Argentina) 1951	Did not participate							
(Mexico) 1955	Did not participate							
(United States) 1959	Did not participate							
(Brazil) 1963	Did not participate							
(Canada) 1967	Did not participate							
(Colombia) 1971	Did not participate							
(Mexico) 1975	Did not participate							
(Puerto Rico) 1979	Did not participate							
(Venezuela) 1983	Did not participate							
(United States) 1987	Did not participate							
(Cuba) 1991	Did not participate							
(Argentina) 1995	Group stage	9th	3	1	0	2	6	10
Since 1999	See Ecuador national under-23 football team							
Total	Group stage	1/12	3	1	0	2	6	10

== Head-to-head record ==
Below is a result summary of all matches Ecuador have played against FIFA recognized teams.

As of 17 November 2026

Positive Record Neutral Record Negative Record

Opponents	Pld	W	D	L	GF	GA	GD	Win %
Argentina	42	6	12	24	37	99	–62	14.29%
Armenia	1	1	0	0	3	0	+3	100%
Australia	3	2	0	1	7	7	0	66.67%
Belarus	1	0	1	0	1	1	0	0%
Bolivia	40	22	12	6	77	39	+38	55%
Brazil	37	2	7	28	24	99	–75	5.41%
Bulgaria	2	1	0	1	4	3	+1	50%
Cameroon	1	0	1	0	0	0	0	0%
Canada	5	2	3	0	6	3	+3	40%
Cape Verde	1	1	0	0	1	0	+1	100%
Chile	55	12	14	29	54	99	–45	21.82%
China	1	0	1	0	0	0	0	0%
Colombia	50	14	13	23	45	54	–9	28%
Costa Rica	13	7	5	1	24	10	+14	53.85%
Croatia	1	1	0	0	1	0	+1	100%
Cuba	4	0	2	2	1	3	–2	0%
Curaçao	1	0	1	0	0	0	0	0%
El Salvador	10	7	2	1	31	8	+23	70%
England	3	0	1	2	2	5	–3	0%
Estonia	2	2	0	0	3	1	+2	100%
Finland	1	1	0	0	3	1	+2	100%
France	2	0	1	1	0	2	–2	0%
FR Yugoslavia	1	1	0	0	1	0	+1	100%
Germany	3	1	0	2	4	8	–4	33.33%
Greece	1	0	1	0	1	1	0	0%
Guatemala	11	6	3	2	14	4	+10	54.55%
Haiti	6	4	0	2	12	6	+6	66.67%
Honduras	19	7	9	3	24	18	+6	36.84%
Hungary	1	1	0	0	1	0	+1	100%
Iran	3	1	2	0	3	2	+1	33.33%
Iraq	1	0	1	0	0	0	0	0%
Italy	3	0	1	2	1	5	–4	0%
Ivory Coast	1	0	0	1	0	1	–1	0%
Jamaica	5	3	2	0	7	2	+5	60%
Japan	5	0	3	2	1	5	–4	0%
Jordan	1	0	0	1	0	3	–3	0%
Kuwait	1	1	0	0	3	0	+3	100%
Lebanon	1	0	0	1	0	1	–1	0%
Libya	1	0	0	1	0	1	–1	0%
Mexico	27	4	8	15	25	43	–18	14.81%
Morocco	1	0	1	0	1	1	0	0%
Netherlands	4	0	3	1	3	4	–1	0%
New Zealand	1	2	0	0	2	0	+2	100%
Nigeria	1	1	0	0	1	0	+1	100%
North Macedonia	1	0	0	1	1	2	–1	0%
Oman	3	1	1	1	2	2	0	33.33%
Panama	10	6	3	1	22	6	+16	60%
Paraguay	42	12	8	22	52	72	–20	28.57%
Peru	58	18	18	22	71	84	–13	31.03%
Poland	3	1	1	1	4	5	–1	33.33%
Portugal	2	1	0	1	3	5	–2	50%
Qatar	4	2	1	1	8	6	+2	50%
Republic of Ireland	2	0	1	1	3	4	–1	0%
Romania	2	1	0	1	4	3	+1	50%
Scotland	1	0	0	1	1	2	–1	0%
Senegal	2	0	0	2	1	3	–2	0%
Saudi Arabia	3	1	2	0	2	1	+1	33.33%
South Korea	3	1	0	2	2	6	–4	33.33%
Spain	2	0	0	2	0	6	–6	0%
Sweden	2	1	1	0	3	2	+1	50%
Switzerland	1	0	0	1	1	2	–1	0%
Trinidad and Tobago	2	2	0	0	6	1	+5	100%
Turkey	1	1	0	0	1	0	+1	100%
Uganda	1	0	0	1	1	2	–1	0%
Uruguay	50	8	11	31	46	115	–69	16%
United States	16	5	6	5	13	12	+1	31.25%
Venezuela	34	16	6	12	59	37	+22	47.06%
Zambia	2	2	0	0	5	1	+4	100%
Total (68)	633	191	170	272	729	921	–192	30%

== Honours ==
=== Regional ===
- Bolivarian Games
  - (gold) Gold medal (2): 1965, 1985
  - (bronze) Bronze medal (1): 1938

=== Friendly ===
- Korea Cup (1): 1995
- Canada Cup (1): 1999

== See also ==
- Ecuador national under-23 football team
- Ecuador national under-20 football team
- Ecuador national under-17 football team
- Ecuador national futsal team

== Trophies ==
Ecuador has won the Panamerican Games 2006/2007 Trophy, Ecuador also won the 1999 Canada Cup Trophy, 1995 Korea Cup Trophy and Finally Ecuador achieved 1st place Gold Medal at the 1965 Bolivarian Games.
