= Felipe Esquivel =

Argentine footballer (born 2008)

Personal information
- Full name: Felipe Gabriel Esquivel
- Date of birth: 12 May 2008 (age 18)
- Place of birth: Barranqueras, Argentina
- Height: 1.70 m (5 ft 7 in)
- Position: Winger

Team information
- Current team: River Plate
- Number: 47

Youth career
- Sarmiento
- 2024–: River Plate II

International career^{‡}
Years	Team	Apps	(Gls)
2023–2024	Argentina U15	14	(3)
2024–	Argentina U17	7	(1)
- ‡ National team caps and goals as of 3 November 2025

Felipe Gabriel Esquivel (born 12 May 2008) is an Argentine professional footballer who plays as a winger for Argentine Primera División club River Plate.

== Early life ==
Esquivel was born on 12 May 2008 in Argentina. The son of Fabiola, he is a native of Barranqueras, Argentina.

== Club career ==
As a youth player, Esquivel joined the youth academy of Sarmiento. Following his stint there, he joined the youth academy of River.

== International career ==
Esquivel is an Argentina youth international. During October 2024, he played for the Argentina national under-15 football team at the 2023 South American U-15 Championship.

== Style of play ==
Esquivel plays as a winger. Argentine news website Radio Facundo Quiroga wrote in 2024 that he "is a right winger, although he can also play as an attacking midfielder. He stands out for his ball control and his ability to beat defenders. He's fast, a good dribbler, likes to provide assists, and gets forward a lot".
