= Lautaro Pereyra =

Argentine footballer (born 2008)

Personal information
- Full name: Lautaro Víctor Ezequiel Pereyra
- Date of birth: 28 March 2008 (age 18)
- Place of birth: Florida, Buenos Aires, Argentina
- Height: 1.76 m (5 ft 9 in)
- Positions: Midfielder; forward

Team information
- Current team: River Plate
- Number: 25

Youth career
- 2018–2026: River Plate

Senior career*
Years	Team	Apps	(Gls)
2026–	River Plate	4	(0)

International career
2023–2024	Argentina U15	4	(1)
2024–2025	Argentina U17	1	(0)
- * Club domestic league appearances and goals

Lautaro Víctor Ezequiel Pereyra (born 28 March 2008) is an Argentine professional association football player who plays as a midfielder for Argentine Primera División club River Plate. Pereyra can also play as a winger or second striker.

== Club career ==
Pereyra began his career at Club Atlético River Plate's academy being only 10 years old, having outstanding performances in all the divisions in which he played, making his reserve debut on 18 September 2025. He made his professional debut on 5 April 2026, in a match corresponding to the 2026 Apertura match against Club Atlético Belgrano, under the direction of Eduardo Coudet.

Pereyra scored his first goal in a 2026 Copa Sudamericana match against Red Bull Bragantino. It secured a 1–1 draw, which was the final score of the game.

== International career ==
Pereyra would be called up by Argentina U15 coach Diego Placente in 2023. He would make his first international goal against Chile U15 team to win 2–1. He would then be moved to the Argentina U17 team in 2024.
