= Luigi Pagano =

Italian painter

Luigi Pagano was an Italian painter, known for his colorful depictions of his native Campania.

== Biography ==
He was born and a resident of Naples. In 1870 at Parma, he sent Una mattinata ad Amalfi, also exhibited the same year in Naples. In 1877, he exhibited in Naples: Ave Maria, oil canvas; Un burrone nel Beneventano; Autunno presso i Camaldoli di Naples and the Aspetta in vano. In 1881 to the Exhibition of Milan, he sent: Autunno paese; Col cader delle frondi è morto; Prato napoletano. To the 1881 Exhibition of Venice, he sent La Valle del Calore.

A painter of the same name was born in 1963 in Scafati; studied in the Academy of Fine Arts of Naples from 1981 to 1985 and served as docent academic in anatomy from 1995 - 96. Actually he is a docent at Fine Arts High School of Naples by continuing his career of painter with several exhibitions all over Italy and Europe.
