= Eduardo Guerrero (footballer) =

Panamanian footballer (born 2000)

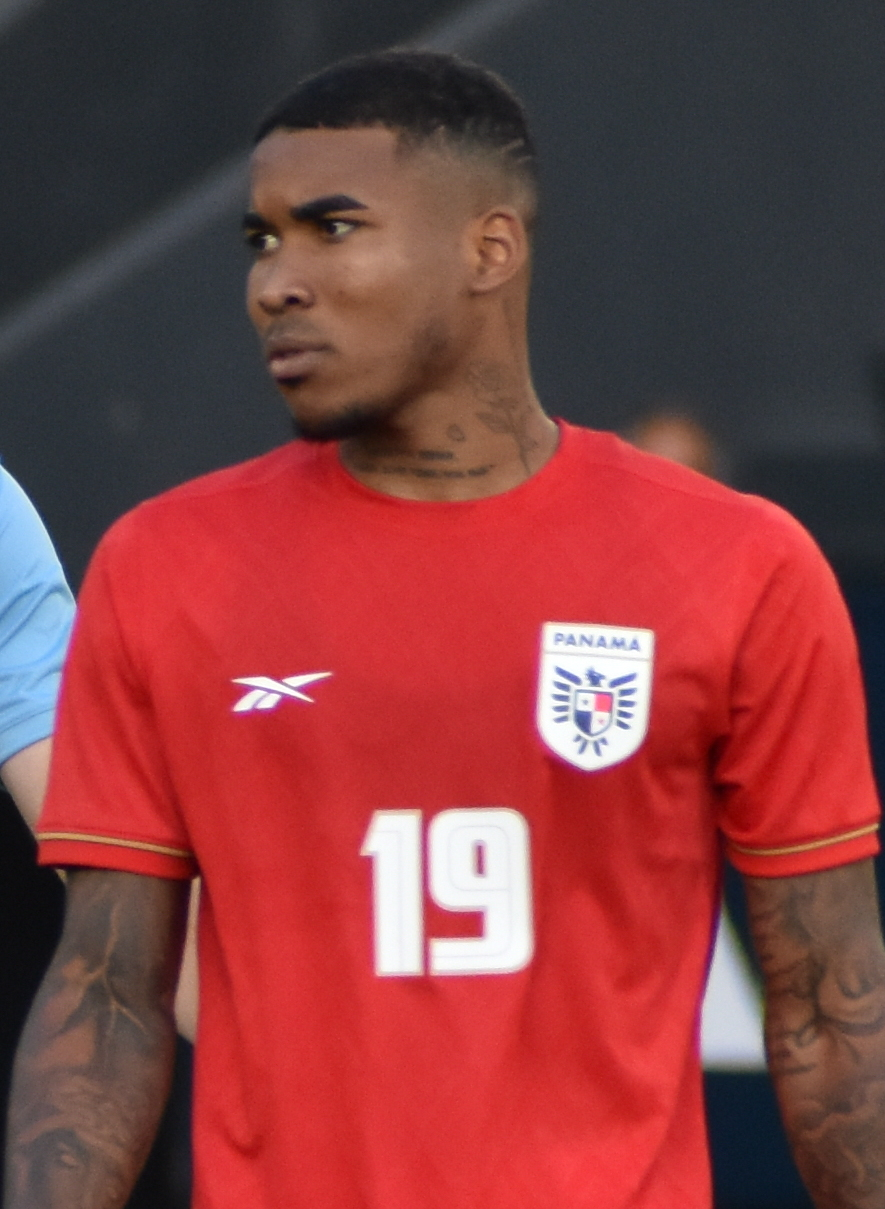
- Guerrero with Panama in 2024

Personal information
- Full name: Eduardo Antonio Guerrero Lozcano
- Date of birth: 21 February 2000 (age 26)
- Place of birth: Panama City, Panama
- Height: 1.77 m (5 ft 10 in)
- Position: Forward

Team information
- Current team: Dynamo Kyiv
- Number: 39

Youth career
- –2017: Chorrillo
- 2018–2019: → Maccabi Tel Aviv (loan)

Senior career*
Years	Team	Apps	(Gls)
2017–2019	Chorrillo	24	(0)
2019–2023	Maccabi Tel Aviv	31	(9)
2019–2020	→ Beitar Tel Aviv Bat Yam (loan)	36	(6)
2022	→ Hapoel Jerusalem (loan)	12	(2)
2022–2023	→ Beitar Jerusalem (loan)	13	(0)
2023	→ Zorya Luhansk (loan)	10	(5)
2023–2024	Zorya Luhansk	28	(10)
2024–	Dynamo Kyiv	43	(3)

International career^{‡}
2017	Panama U17	5	(4)
2019	Panama U20	1	(0)
2017–	Panama	22	(3)
- * Club domestic league appearances and goals as of 23 October 2026 ‡ National team caps and goals as of 28 June 2025

Eduardo Antonio Guerrero Lozcano (born 21 February 2000) is a Panamanian professional footballer who plays as a forward for Ukrainian Premier League club Dynamo Kyiv and the Panama national team.

== Club career ==
On 3 September 2018, Guerrero joined Israeli Premier League side Maccabi Tel Aviv on a season-long loan deal with the option to make the deal permanent, playing for the club's U19 squad.

Maccabi Tel Aviv exercised the option to buy on 17 July 2019.

After a successful loan spell, Zorya Luhansk purchased Guerrero from Maccabi for €500k, with hopes that the Panamanian would continue his good form for the club in their 2023-24 UEFA Europa Conference League campaign. Guerrero was Zorya's top scorer in the competition, netting a goal against each of the team's group stage opponents. Despite this Zorya were eliminated in the group stage, placing 3rd.

The 2023-24 Ukrainian Premier League saw Zorya endure their worst season in over a decade. Despite this, Guerrero scored 13 goals in all competitions. He was also tied for 4th in the Ukrainian League's top scorers for the season, with 9 goals in 23 matches.

On September 4, 2024, Guerrero signed a five-year contract with Dynamo Kyiv.

== International career ==
Guerrero made his international debut for Panama on 24 October 2017 during a friendly match against Grenada. He scored his first goal against Bolivia in the 2024 Copa America, a goal that would qualify Panama to the quarterfinal of the competition.

Having featured in Panama's World Cup qualifying matches in June 2025, Guerrero was included in Thomas Christiansen's 26-man squad for the 2025 CONCACAF Gold Cup. Guerrero started in Panama's opening match against Guadeloupe, scoring a goal from the penalty spot in a 5-2 victory.

== Career statistics ==
=== Club ===
As of match played 27 October 2026

Appearances and goals by club, season and competition
Club	Season	League			National cup (Note: Includes Israel State Cup, Ukrainian Cup)		League cup (Note: Includes Toto Cup)		Continental		Other		Total	
Club	Season	Division	Apps	Goals	Apps	Goals	Apps	Goals	Apps	Goals	Apps	Goals	Apps	Goals
Chorrillo	2016–17	Liga Panameña de Fútbol	3	0	0	0	—		—		—		3	0
Chorrillo	2017–18	Liga Panameña de Fútbol	21	0	—		—		1 (Note: Appearance in CONCACAF League)	0	—		22	0
Chorrillo	2018–19	Liga Panameña de Fútbol	0	0	0	0	—		0	0	—		0	0
Chorrillo	Total		24	0	0	0	0	0	1	0	0	0	25	0
Maccabi Tel Aviv	2019–20	Israeli Premier League	0	0	0	0	0	0	0	0	0	0	0	0
Maccabi Tel Aviv	2020–21	Israeli Premier League	17	7	4	0	1	0	5 (Note: One appearance in UEFA Champions League, four appearances in UEFA Europa League)	0	2 (Note: Appearance(s) in Israel Super Cup)	0	29	7
Maccabi Tel Aviv	2021–22	Israeli Premier League	14	2	1	1	0	0	9 (Note: Appearances in UEFA Europa Conference League)	0	1	0	25	3
Maccabi Tel Aviv	2021–22	Israeli Premier League	0	0	0	0	0	0	0	0	1	0	1	0
Maccabi Tel Aviv	Total		31	9	5	1	1	0	14	0	4	0	55	10
Beitar Tel Aviv Bat Yam (loan)	2019–20	Liga Leumit	36	6	0	0	0	0	—		—		36	6
Hapoel Jerusalem (loan)	2021–22	Israeli Premier League	12	2	0	0	—		—		—		12	2
Beitar Jerusalem (loan)	2022–23	Israeli Premier League	13	0	0	0	1	0	—		—		14	0
Zorya Luhansk (loan)	2022–23	Ukrainian Premier League	10	5	—		—		—		—		10	5
Zorya Luhansk	2023–24	Ukrainian Premier League	23	9	2	1	—		8 (Note: Two appearances in UEFA Europa League, six appearances and three goals in UEFA Europa Conference League)	3	—		33	13
Dynamo Kyiv	2024–25	Ukrainian Premier League	16	0	3	1	—		7 (Note: Appearances in UEFA Europa League)	0	—		26	1
Dynamo Kyiv	2025–26	Ukrainian Premier League	23	4	3	2	—		8 (Note: One appearance in UEFA Champions League, two appearances and one goal in UEFA Europa League, five appearances and one goal in UEFA Conference League)	2	—		34	8
Dynamo Kyiv	2026–27	Ukrainian Premier League	4	0	2	0	—		3 (Note: One appearance in UEFA Europa League, two appearances in UEFA Conference League)	0	—		9	0
Dynamo Kyiv	Total		43	4	8	3	—		18	2	—		69	9
Career total			185	34	14	4	2	0	42	5	4	0	254	5

=== International ===
As of 28 June 2025

National team	Year	Apps	Goals
Panama	2017	1	0
Panama	2018	0	0
Panama	2019	0	0
Panama	2020	1	0
Panama	2021	3	0
Panama	2022	1	0
Panama	2023	2	0
Panama	2024	9	1
Panama	2025	5	2
Total		22	3

Scores and results list Panama's goal tally first, score column indicates score after each Guerrero goal.

List of international goals scored by Eduardo Guerrero
No.	Date	Venue	Opponent	Score	Result	Competition
1	1 July 2024	Inter&Co Stadium, Orlando, United States	Bolivia	2–1	3–1	2024 Copa América
2	7 June 2025	FFB Stadium, Belmopan, Belize	Belize	2–0	2–0	2026 FIFA World Cup qualification
3	16 June 2025	Dignity Health Sports Park, Carson, United States	Guadeloupe	4–0	5–2	2025 CONCACAF Gold Cup

== Honours ==
Maccabi Tel Aviv

- Israeli State Cup: 2020–21
- Israel Super Cup: 2020

Dynamo Kyiv

- Ukrainian Premier League: 2024–25
- Ukrainian Cup: 2025–26

Panama

- CONCACAF Nations League runner-up: 2024–25
