= Ederson Castillo =

Ecuadorian footballer (born 2008)

Personal information
- Full name: Ederson Edwin Castillo Ayoví
- Date of birth: 10 December 2008 (age 17)
- Place of birth: Guayaquil, Guayas, Ecuador
- Height: 1.74 m (5 ft 9 in)
- Position: Midfielder

Team information
- Current team: LDU Quito
- Number: 21

Youth career
- 2023–2024: LDU Quito

Senior career*
Years	Team	Apps	(Gls)
2024–	LDU Quito	7	(0)

International career^{‡}
2024	Ecuador U15	6	(0)
2024	Ecuador U17	2	(0)
- * Club domestic league appearances and goals as of 22:15, 18 July 2026 (UTC) ‡ National team caps and goals as of 16:53, 5 August 2025 (UTC)

Ederson Edwin Castillo Ayoví (born 10 December 2008) is an Ecuadorian footballer who currently plays as a midfielder for LDU Quito.

== Club career ==
At fifteen years old, Castillo was called up to the LDU Quito first team ahead of their LigaPro Serie A match against Aucas on 17 August 2024, with then-manager Vitamina Sánchez stating that the club saw him as someone who could become a "very good player". Though he remained on the bench during this game, he would make his professional debut later in the same year - still aged fifteen - against Deportivo Cuenca on 1 December, replacing Fernando Cornejo as a second-half substitute in Quito's 5–0 win.

== International career ==
Having represented Ecuador at under-15 level for the 2023 South American U-15 Championship, Castillo was called up to the nation's under-17 squad for friendly matches against Costa Rica in August 2024. He was a shock omission from the under-17 squad for the 2025 South American U-17 Championship, with his club coach, Vitamina Sánchez, claiming that Ecuador coach Juan Carlos Burbano had taken issue with Quito previously refusing to allow Castillo to play in both friendly matches against Brazil in February 2025.

In November 2024 he was called up to the full Ecuador national football team by manager Sebastián Beccacece for training sessions, with Beccacece stating that his coaching team "intend to continue developing players." He was called up to the senior squad again in March 2025 for training.

== Career statistics ==
=== Club ===
As of 18 JUuy 2026.

Appearances and goals by club, season and competition
Club	Season	League			Cup		Continental		Other		Total	
Club	Season	Division	Apps	Goals	Apps	Goals	Apps	Goals	Apps	Goals	Apps	Goals
LDU Quito	2024	LigaPro Serie A	1	0	0	0	0	0	0	0	1	0
LDU Quito	2025	LigaPro Serie A	3	0	0	0	1 (Note: Appearances in the Copa Libertadores)	0	0	0	4	0
LDU Quito	2026	LigaPro Serie A	3	0	0	0	0	0	—		3	0
Career total			7	0	0	0	1	0	0	0	8	0
