= Enrique Lamas =

Chilean footballer and manager

Personal information
- Full name: Enrique Lamas
- Place of birth: Chile
- Position: Forward

Senior career*
Years	Team	Apps	(Gls)
1933	Magallanes		
1934–1935	Panamá SC		
1935–1937	Santiago Wanderers		
1937	Panamá SC		

Managerial career
- 1938: Ecuador
- * Club domestic league appearances and goals

Enrique Lamas was a Chilean football manager and former player who played as a forward. He is known as the first manager of the Ecuador national team.

== Career ==
In his homeland, Lamas played for Magallanes in the first season of the Primera División (1933) and Santiago Wanderers in both the Asociación Valparaíso and the 1937 Primera División.

Abroad, he had two stints with the Ecuadorian club Panamá SC in 1934–35 and 1937.

Following his career as a player, he assumed as coach of the Ecuador national team at the 1938 Bolivarian Games, becoming the first manager in its history. He led the team in the five matches getting two wins, a draw and two losses, with 10 goals for to 15 against.

== Personal life ==
He was nicknamed Turco (Turkish).

== Honours ==
=== Manager ===
- Boliviarian Games Bronze medal: 1938
