= Wesley Natã (footballer, born 2008) =

Brazilian footballer (born 2008)

Personal information
- Full name: Wesley Natã de Freitas Prado
- Date of birth: 18 April 2008 (age 18)
- Place of birth: Rio de Janeiro, Brazil
- Height: 1.73 m (5 ft 8 in)
- Position: Forward

Team information
- Current team: Fluminense
- Number: 34

Youth career
- 2021–: Fluminense

Senior career*
Years	Team	Apps	(Gls)
2025–	Fluminense	3	(0)

International career
2024	Brazil U15	4	(1)
2025–	Brazil U17	5	(0)
- * Club domestic league appearances and goals as of 26 April 2025

Wesley Natã de Freitas Prado (born 18 April 2008), better known as Wesley Natã, is a Brazilian professional footballer who plays as a forward for Fluminense.

== Club career ==
Born in Rio de Janeiro, Wesley Natã began his career at the Fluminense academy at the age of 13 in 2021. In 2025, at the age of 16, he was the star of Fluminense, in the titles of Brazilian Championship and the Copa do Brasil under-17. On 24 April 2025, he became the first player born in 2008 to play for Fluminense, coming on as a substitute in the match against Unión Española for the Copa Sudamericana.

== International career ==
Wesley Natã was called up by coach Dudu Patetuci for the 2023 South American U-15 Championship (held in October 2024), and the 2025 South American U-17 Championship.

== Honours ==
Fluminense U17

- Campeonato Brasileiro Sub-17: 2024
- Copa do Brasil Sub-17: 2024
- Torneio Guilherme Embry: 2024

Brazil U17

- South American U-17 Championship: 2025
