= Juan Riquelme Angulo =

Ecuadorian footballer (born 2008)

Personal information
- Full name: Juan Riquelme Angulo Caicedo
- Date of birth: 12 January 2008 (age 18)
- Place of birth: San Lorenzo, Esmeraldas, Ecuador
- Height: 1.93 m (6 ft 4 in)
- Position: Centre-forward

Team information
- Current team: Sunderland
- Number: 50

Youth career
- Independiente del Valle

Senior career*
Years	Team	Apps	(Gls)
2026	Independiente del Valle	15	(6)
2026–	Sunderland	1	(0)

International career^{‡}
2024	Ecuador U15	7	(4)
2025–	Ecuador U17	6	(1)
2026–	Ecuador	3	(1)
- * Club domestic league appearances and goals as of 10 October 2026 ‡ National team caps and goals as of 5 October 2026

Juan Riquelme Angulo Caicedo (born 12 January 2008) is an Ecuadorian professional footballer who plays as a centre-forward for Premier League club Sunderland and the Ecuador national team.

== Club career ==
In August 2025, he went on trial with Spanish club Celta Vigo, alongside Independiente del Valle teammates Ariel Angulo and Zair Arroyo. In October of the same year, he was named by English newspaper The Guardian as one of the best players born in 2008 worldwide.

Angulo marked his professional debut for Independiente del Valle with a goal; the third in the club's 3–1 win against Mushuc Runa on 7 March 2026. Having been linked with a move to English Premier League club Manchester United, Independiente del Valle president Santiago Morales confirmed the club had not received any offers, following Angulo's good performance in the club's 0–0 Copa Libertadores draw with Argentine club Rosario Central.

=== Sunderland ===
On 1 September 2026, Angulo signed a long-term contract with Premier League side Sunderland.

== International career ==
Angulo was called up to the Ecuador under-15 squad for the 2023 South American U-15 Championship, held in October 2024. Goals against Uruguay and Brazil helped his side to a second-place finish in the group stage, and he notched another against Chile in the semi-final. Despite finishing as the tournament's top scorer, he was unable to prevent his side losing 4–3 in a penalty shoot out to Paraguay in the final, after a 0–0 draw in normal time.

In March 2025, following injuries to John Yeboah and Kevin Rodríguez, Angulo was called up by manager Sebastián Beccacece to the senior squad. Despite this, he did not feature in Ecuador's 0–0 2026 FIFA World Cup qualification draw with Chile, and instead was called up to the under-17 squad for the 2025 South American U-17 Championship. Despite scoring in Ecuador's opening 4–0 win against Uruguay, this would be his only goal in the competition, as Ecuador finished eighth.

On 24 September 2026, Angulo made his senior international debut in a friendly against South Korea.

== Style of play ==
Standing at 1.93 m, Angulo has drawn comparisons to prolific Norwegian forward Erling Haaland. He has been lauded for his agility and mobility, despite his height, but in spite of this advantage over other players, his lack of heading ability is a noted weakness, with his brother, José Enrique Angulo, stating that he "doesn't like" heading.

== Personal life ==
Angulo is the brother of fellow professional footballer José Enrique Angulo, and following good performances at the 2023 South American U-15 Championship, José stated that Juan was the "improved version" of him.

== Career statistics ==
=== Club ===
As of 10 October 2026.

Appearances and goals by club, season and competition
Club	Season	League			National cup (Note: Includes Copa Ecuador)		League cup		Continental		Other		Total	
Club	Season	Division	Apps	Goals	Apps	Goals	Apps	Goals	Apps	Goals	Apps	Goals	Apps	Goals
Independiente del Valle	2026	LigaPro Serie A	15	6	2	1	—		5 (Note: Appearances in Copa Libertadores)	0	1 (Note: Appearance in Supercopa Ecuador)	0	23	7
Sunderland	2026–27	Premier League	1	0	0	0	0	0	0	0	—		1	0
Career total			16	6	2	1	0	0	5	0	1	0	24	7

=== International ===
As of match played 5 October 2026

Appearances and goals by national team and year
National team	Year	Apps	Goals
Ecuador	2026	3	1
Total		3	1

Scores and results list Ecuador's goal tally first, score column indicates score after each Angulo goal.

List of international goals scored by Juan Riquelme Angulo
No.	Date	Venue	Opponent	Score	Result	Competition
1.	5 October 2026	National Stadium, Tokyo, Japan	Panama	1–1	1–1 (6–7 p)	2026 Kirin Cup Soccer
