= 2026 Kirin Cup Soccer =

キリンカップサッカー2026

Tournament details
- Host country: Japan
- Dates: 1–5 October
- Teams: 4 (from 4 confederations)
- Venues: 2 (in 2 host cities)

Final positions
- Champions: Japan (12th title)
- Runners-up: New Zealand
- Third place: Panama
- Fourth place: Ecuador

Tournament statistics
- Matches played: 4
- Goals scored: 7 (1.75 per match)
- Attendance: 149,701 (37,425 per match)
- Top scorer(s): Seven players (7 goals each)
- Best player: (Japan) Ayase Ueda

The 2026 Kirin Cup Soccer was the 33rd edition of the international friendly football tournament Kirin Cup Soccer organised by the Japan Football Association (JFA), which was played in Japan between 1 and 5 October 2026, with the participation of four teams: Ecuador, Japan, New Zealand and Panama. This is the first Kirin Cup Soccer tournament in four years, since 2022.

Tunisia are the title holders. Japan won the title for the 12th time in its history after defeating New Zealand 2–1 in the final. Ayase Ueda was named the best player of the tournament

== Teams ==
The friendly tournament featured a total of four national teams for the 2026 edition.

Country	Confederation	Manager	Appearance	Previous best performance	FIFA ranking at start of event
Japan (hosts)	AFC	(Japan) Hajime Moriyasu	33nd	Champions (Eleven times) (Note: Japan won in 1991, 1995, 1996, 1997, 2000, 2001, 2004, 2007, 2008, 2009 and 2011.)	
Ecuador	CONMEBOL	(Argentina) Marcelo Gallardo	2nd	Third place (1995)	
New Zealand	OFC	(England) Darren Bazeley	1st	Debut	
Panama	CONCACAF	(Spain) Thomas Christiansen	1st	Debut	

== Venues ==
Location of areas hosting the 2026 Kirin Cup Soccer
1 Yokohama
2 Tokyo

The two stadiums selected for the tournament are: Nissan Stadium in Yokohama, to host the semi-final matches on 1 October, and National Stadium in Tokyo for the third-place classification match and the final on 5 October.

Yokohama	Tokyo
Nissan Stadium	National Stadium
35°30′36″N 139°36′22″E	35°40′41″N 139°42′43″E
Capacity: 72,327	Capacity: 67,750

== Results ==
All times are local, Japan Standard Time (UTC+9).

=== Bracket ===
Semi-finals
1 October – Yokohama
Panama	1 (3)
New Zealand (p)	1 (5)
1 October – Yokohama
Japan (p)	0 (5)
Ecuador	0 (4)

Final
5 October – Tokyo
Japan	2
New Zealand	1
Third place match
5 October – Tokyo
Ecuador	1 (6)
Panama (p)	1 (7)

=== Semi-finals ===
1 October 2026
15:10 UTC+9

Panama	1–1	New Zealand
Herbert 45+1'	Report (JFA); Report (JFA)	Stamenić 13'
Penalties
Murillo (penalty scored); Harvey (penalty scored); Jiménez (penalty missed); Griffith (penalty scored)	3–5	(penalty scored) Bindon; (penalty scored) Stamenić; (penalty scored) Dyer; (penalty scored) Bayliss; (penalty scored) Boxall

Nissan Stadium, Yokohama, Japan
Attendance: 8,513
Referee: Rubiel Vazquez (United States)

1 October 2026
19:25 UTC+9

Japan	0–0	Ecuador
	Report (JFA); Report (JFA)
Penalties
Ueda (penalty scored); Kamada (penalty scored); H. Itō (penalty scored); Sōma (penalty scored); Maeda (penalty scored)	5–4	(penalty scored) J. Caicedo; (penalty scored) Minda; (penalty missed) Castillo; (penalty scored) Sarmiento; (penalty scored) Valencia

Nissan Stadium, Yokohama, Japan
Attendance: 65,012
Referee: Wiwat Jumpaoon (Thailand)

=== Third place match ===
5 October 2026
15:30 UTC+9

Ecuador	1–1	Panama
J. Angulo 58'	Report (JFA); Report (JFA)	Vergara 38'
Penalties
Vite (penalty scored); Valencia (penalty missed); Yeboah (penalty scored); N. Angulo (penalty scored); Arroyo (penalty scored); Pacho (penalty scored); F. Caicedo (penalty scored); J. Angulo (penalty missed)	6–7	(penalty scored) Murillo; (penalty scored) Harvey; (penalty missed) Griffith; (penalty scored) T. Rodríguez; (penalty scored) R. Mosquera; (penalty scored) Blackman; (penalty scored) Herbert; (penalty scored) D. Murillo

National Stadium, Tokyo, Japan
Attendance: 14,364
Referee: Kōki Nagamine (Japan)

=== Final ===
5 October 2026
19:30 UTC+9

Japan	2–1	New Zealand
Ueda 28'; Dōan 71'	Report (JFA); Report (JFA)	Old 32'

National Stadium, Tokyo, Japan
Attendance: 61,812
Referee: Nazmi Nasaruddin (Malaysia)

== Statistics ==
=== Goalscorers ===
There were 7 goals scored in 4 matches, for an average of 1.75 goals per match.

1 goal

- (Ecuador) Juan Riquelme Angulo
- (Japan) Ayase Ueda
- (Japan) Ritsu Dōan
- (New Zealand) Marko Stamenić
- (New Zealand) Ben Old
- (Panama) Giovany Herbert
- (Panama) Josué Vergara

=== Awards ===
- Best player: (Japan) Ayase Ueda

== See also ==
- Kirin Challenge Cup (an international friendly match)
- Kirin Company (supporting company)
- Japan Football Association (JFA)
