= Deinner Ordóñez =

Ecuadorian footballer (born 2009)

Personal information
- Full name: Deinner Eliut Ordóñez Corozo
- Date of birth: 29 October 2009 (age 17)
- Place of birth: Esmeraldas, Ecuador
- Height: 1.88 m (6 ft 2 in)
- Position: Centre-back

Team information
- Current team: Independiente del Valle
- Number: 50

Youth career
- Independiente del Valle

International career^{‡}
| Years | Team | Apps | (Gls) |
| 2024 | Ecuador U15 | 9 | (1) |
| 2025– | Ecuador U17 | 7 | (1) |
| 2025– | Ecuador U20 | 4 | (0) |
- ‡ National team caps and goals as of 16:53, 21 May 2025 (UTC)

Deinner Eliut Ordóñez Corozo (born 29 October 2009) is an Ecuadorian footballer who currently plays as a centre-back for Independiente Del Valle.

== Club career ==
Ordóñez' impressive performances in Independiente Del Valle's academy earned him promotion to the club's under-17 side at the age of fourteen. In April 2025, he was linked with a move to English Premier League side Liverpool.

In November 2025, it was reported that Chelsea had reached an agreement in principle to sign Ordóñez, with the defender expected to join the club when he becomes eligible in January 2028.

== International career ==
At the age of fourteen, Ordóñez was called up to the Ecuador under-17 side for microcycles in 2024. Later in the same year he was called up to the nation's under-15 side for the 2023 South American U-15 Championship, held in October 2024.

Despite only being fifteen at the time, Ordóñez was called up to Ecuador's under-20 side for the 2025 South American U-20 Championship in January 2025, replacing Diogo Bagüí, who withdrew through injury. He started in Ecuador's opening game against Bolivia, helping his team to a 2–1 win, and becoming Ecuador's youngest ever player at the competition.

In March of the same year, he was called up to the under-17 squad ahead of the 2025 South American U-17 Championship. In Ecuador's opening game against Uruguay, Ordóñez impressed with his performance in the 4–0 win.

== Style of play ==
A tall centre-back, Ordóñez is noted for his pace, strength and heading ability. Ordóñez is a modern, ball-playing centre-back who blends a tall, athletic frame with technical composure. He is known for initiating attacks by carrying the ball from the back and is adept with both feet, giving him a wide passing range.
