= Giovany Herbert =

Panamanian footballer (born 2006)

Personal information
- Full name: Giovany Aymar Herbert Forcheney
- Date of birth: 12 March 2005 (age 21)
- Place of birth: Colón, Panama
- Height: 1.83 m (6 ft 0 in)
- Position: Attacking midfielder

Team information
- Current team: Kryvbas Kryvyi Rih (on loan from Árabe Unido)
- Number: 10

Youth career
- Atlético Bilbao de Calle 8
- Champions Academy
- Árabe Unido

Senior career*
Years	Team	Apps	(Gls)
2023–2025	Árabe Unido	31	(2)
2025–2026	Athletico Paranaense	0	(0)
2026–	Árabe Unido	3	(1)
2026–	→ Kryvbas Kryvyi Rih (loan)	18	(1)

International career^{‡}
2024	Panama U19	2	(0)
2024–	Panama U20	8	(2)
2025–	Panama	6	(1)
- * Club domestic league appearances and goals as of 18 September 2026 ‡ National team caps and goals as of 5 October 2026

Giovany Aymar Herbert Forcheney (born 12 March 2005) is a Panamanian professional footballer who plays as an attacking midfielder for Ukrainian club Kryvbas Kryvyi Rih on loan from Árabe Unido and the Panama national team.

== Playing career ==
Herbert began playing football at the age of 9 with Atlético Bilbao de Calle 8 then Champions Academy, before finishing his development with Árabe Unido. In 2023 he debuted with the senior Árabe Unido team in the Liga Panameña de Fútbol. On 27 February 2025, he joined the Campeonato Brasileiro Série B club Athletico Paranaense on a contract until 2027.

In February 2026, Herbert joined Ukrainian Premier League club Kryvbas Kryvyi Rih on loan for the remainder of the season.

== International career ==
Herbert first played with the Panama U20s at the 2024 CONCACAF U-20 Championship. He debuted with the senior Panama national team in a friendly 6–1 loss to Chile on 8 February 2025. He again made the U20s for the 2025 Maurice Revello Tournament. He was called up to the Panama U20s again for the 2025 FIFA U-20 World Cup.

== Career statistics ==
=== Club ===
As of match played 18 September 2026

Appearances and goals by club, season and competition
Club	Season	League			National cup		Continental		Other		Total	
Club	Season	Division	Apps	Goals	Apps	Goals	Apps	Goals	Apps	Goals	Apps	Goals
Árabe Unido	2023	Liga LPF	9	0	—		—		—		9	0
Árabe Unido	2024	Liga LPF	19	1	—		—		—		19	1
Árabe Unido	2025	Liga LPF	3	1	—		—		—		3	1
Árabe Unido	Total		31	2	—		—		—		31	2
Athletico Paranaense	2025	Série B	0	0	0	0	—		—		0	0
Árabe Unido	2026	Liga LPF	3	1	—		—		—		3	1
Kryvbas Kryvyi Rih (loan)	2025–26	Ukrainian Premier League	12	1	—		—		—		12	1
Kryvbas Kryvyi Rih (loan)	2026–27	Ukrainian Premier League	6	1	2	1	—		—		8	2
Kryvbas Kryvyi Rih (loan)	Total		18	2	2	1	—		—		20	3
Career total			52	5	2	1	0	0	0	0	54	6

=== International ===
As of match played 5 October 2026

Appearances and goals by national team and year
National team	Year	Apps	Goals
Panama	2025	1	0
Panama	2026	5	1
Total		6	1

Scores and results list Panama's goal tally first, score column indicates score after each Herbert goal.

List of international goals scored by Giovany Herbert
No.	Date	Venue	Opponent	Score	Result	Competition
1	1 October 2026	Nissan Stadium, Yokohama, Japan	New Zealand	1–1	1–1 (5–3 p)	2026 Kirin Cup Soccer

== Personal life ==
Herbert's twin brother Antony Herbert is also a professional footballer.
