= MLS Cup =

Annual soccer tournament

- Founded: 1996
- Region: Major League Soccer (CONCACAF)
- Current champions: Inter Miami CF (1st title)
- Most championships: LA Galaxy (6 titles)
- Broadcasters: United States: MLS Season Pass; Fox/Fox Deportes; Canada: TSN/RDS; International: Broadcasters
- Website: mlssoccer.com
- MLS Cup 2025

MLS Cup is the annual championship game of Major League Soccer (MLS) and the culmination of the MLS Cup playoffs. The game is held in November or December and pits the winner of the Eastern Conference Final against the winner of the Western Conference Final. The MLS Cup winner is awarded the title of league champion.

MLS uses a playoff tournament following the regular season to determine its annual league champion, a method used by other major professional sports leagues in the United States and Canada. This format differs from most soccer leagues around the world, which consider the club with the most points at the end of the season to be the champion; MLS honors that achievement with the Supporters' Shield.

The winner of MLS Cup is awarded one of the league's five berths in the following season's CONCACAF Champions Cup. (Note: Canadian MLS teams could not earn a berth through MLS play until 2023.) Starting with the 2024 CONCACAF Champions Cup, the three MLS teams based in Canada were eligible to qualify for the CONCACAF Champions Cup through slots allocated to MLS.

The inaugural MLS Cup was held on October 20, 1996, in which D.C. United defeated the LA Galaxy. The Galaxy are the most successful team in MLS Cup history, winning a record sixth title in 2024.

Three trophy designs have been used for MLS Cup: the Alan I. Rothenberg Trophy from 1996 through 1998, a redesigned Alan I. Rothenberg Trophy from 1999 through 2007, and the Philip F. Anschutz Trophy since 2008.

== History ==
=== D.C. United dynasty ===
MLS Cup's roots trace back to the foundation of Major League Soccer, when the league decided to hold a championship format similar to its contemporary North American sports leagues. The first few editions of the game were dominated by D.C. United, who appeared in the first four MLS Cup finals, winning three.

The inaugural MLS Cup in 1996 featured D.C. United and LA Galaxy. The Galaxy went ahead 2–0 early in the second half, but their lead was relinquished towards the end of the match when Tony Sanneh pulled one back in the 72nd minute. Nine minutes later, Shawn Medved tied the match at two, resulting in overtime between the two sides. Four minutes into overtime, Eddie Pope gave United the golden goal victory.

In 1997, the second league cup final was contested at RFK Stadium, where United won back-to-back titles, a feat that would not be accomplished for another decade (when the Houston Dynamo won the 2006 and 2007 finals). The game ended 2–1 in United's favor over the Colorado Rapids, who would not win a championship until 2010. Jaime Moreno was declared Man of the Match for his goal in the 37th minute of play. This season was also the first time in league history any MLS team won the regular season (Supporters' Shield) and postseason title in the same season.

D.C. United's run ended the third year, when they made a third run to the MLS Cup finals, only to lose to the expansion side Chicago Fire by 2–0. However the following year, United repeated their "double" of winning both the Supporters Shield and MLS Cup the same season. This time, it was a 2–0 win over the Galaxy in the 1999 MLS Cup final.

=== Rise of the California Clásico ===
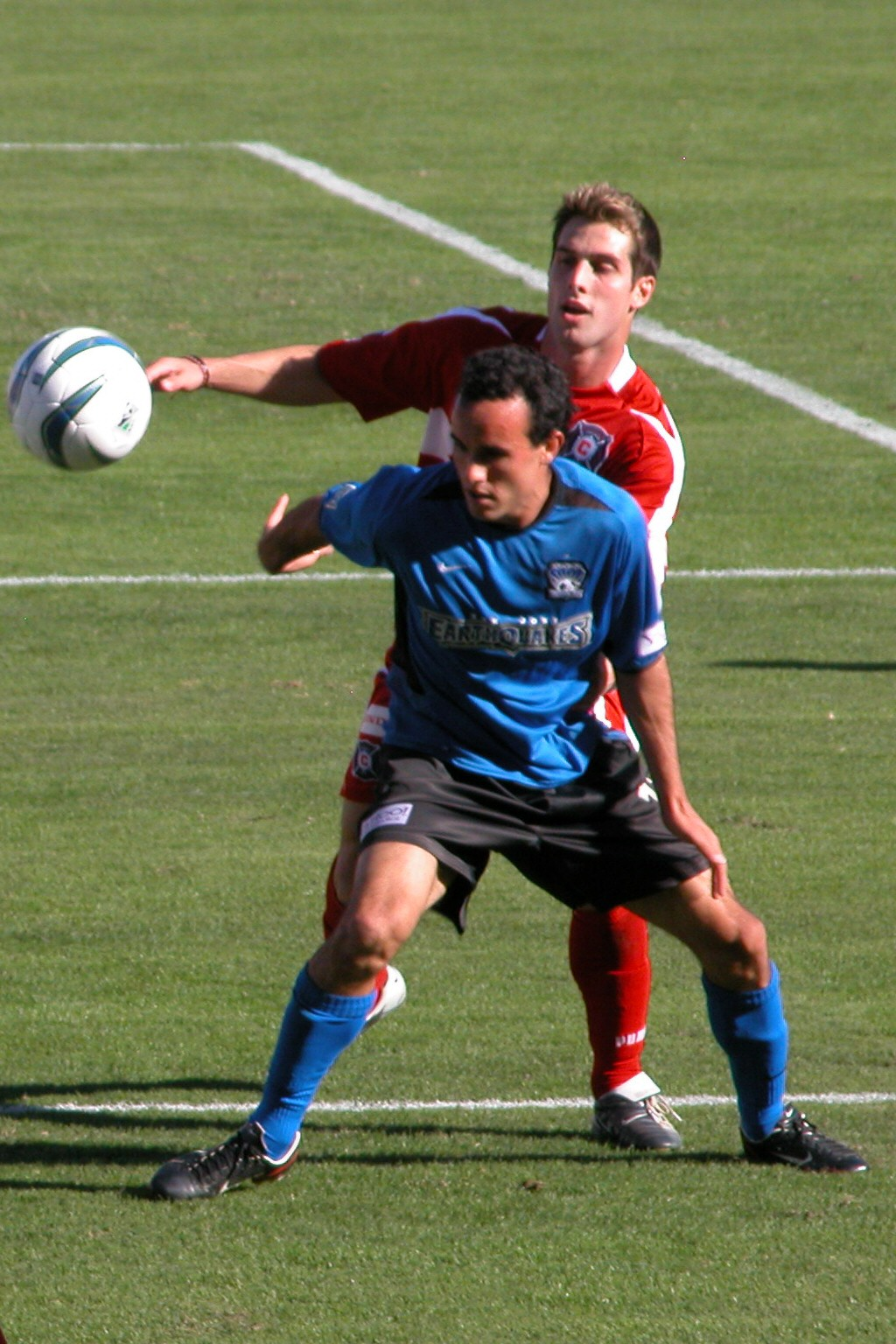
Landon Donovan of San Jose defending against Chicago's Carlos Bocanegra in the 2003 MLS Cup.

For the first time since 1997, the 2000 MLS Cup final saw a new club reach the finals along with the Fire. This time the Kansas City Wizards, now known as Sporting Kansas City, won their first MLS Cup with a 1–0 victory over the Fire.

From 2001 through 2005, the MLS Cup finals saw a rising of the California Clásico when intrastate rivals L.A. Galaxy and the San Jose Earthquakes clashed in the 2001 final. The match also saw the rise of U.S. national Landon Donovan who won a Newcomer of the Year award and tallied the equalizer in the Earthquakes 2–1 championship victory over the Galaxy.

With the largest crowd in MLS Cup history at hand, the New England Revolution took on the Galaxy in the 2002 finals. For the match, over 61,000 fans were in attendance at Gillette Stadium to witness the final. In the second period of sudden-death overtime, the Galaxy nabbed their first MLS Cup title, and sparked the start of a string of MLS Cup losses for the Revolution.

The 2003 final saw the league leaders for that season go head-to-head. Two clubs that had MLS Cup experience, the Fire and Earthquakes, played for the final that year. The two clubs had successful regular season campaigns with the Fire winning their first Supporters' Shield, and the Earthquakes being the Western Conference regular season and post-season champions as well as having the second best overall regular season record. In a hotly contested match, the Earthquakes won with their second MLS Cup title with a 4–2 score making it the highest scoring MLS Cup final in league history (six goals).

After a four-year absence, United made their fifth trip to MLS Cup, playing against the Wizards for MLS Cup 2004. The match had four goals scored in the first 25 minutes, with United rallying for a 3–1 lead. Midway through the second half, United had relinquished a penalty kick. Josh Wolff scored for Kansas City, bringing the game within a goal. D.C. United was able to retain the lead, by winning their fourth MLS Cup title, by a score of 3–2.

For the 2005 season, the Earthquakes, as the Supporters' Shield winners, fell to the Galaxy in the Playoffs. The Galaxy went on to win MLS Cup, matching the Earthquakes at two.

=== Format changes ===
Until 2005, the MLS Cup championship games had been dominated by clubs that had either won or had come close to winning the Supporters Shield. In the 2005 MLS Cup championship, the match was won by the LA Galaxy, which won the league title while having a ninth-place overall record. The Wizards had a better record, but did not qualify for the playoffs because they finished 5th in the Eastern Conference, in spite of an 8th-place overall record. The result prompted MLS to create new wild-cards that were used starting in 2006, where a certain number of clubs per conference could qualify, and the next best overall teams regardless of conference would also qualify. That prompted debates about the league switching to a single table and a balanced schedule. The single table has yet been instituted, but in 2010 the league instituted a balanced schedule. Starting in the 2012 season, the league resumed an unbalanced schedule.

=== Scudetto era ===
Second MLS Scudetto (2009–2012)

At the start of the 2006 season, MLS created their version of the scudetto (Italian for "small shield"), a symbol worn on the jersey by the team who won the previous season's Serie A (the top Italian league).

The MLS scudetto was originally a curved, triangular badge featuring a backdrop of the American flag behind a replica of the Alan I. Rothenberg MLS Cup trophy. First worn by LA Galaxy in 2006, following their 2005 MLS Cup title, the Houston Dynamo wore the same triangular scudettos in 2007 and 2008 during their dual-cup run. It was redesigned after the 2008 season after the change to the MLS Cup trophy. It is now an oval-shaped black badge with the Philip F. Anschutz Trophy in the middle. The MLS scudetto was worn by the winning team the season following the victory. It is only during the subsequent season (two years after winning the championship), that the team adds a star – a common soccer signifier of titles won – above the team logo. The team can display the star on other items beside their jersey in the year after winning the Cup, but only if the scudetto is not shown. The Columbus Crew was the first team to wear the redesigned scudetto. Real Salt Lake wore the scudetto in 2010 after winning their first MLS cup in 2009. A year after the Colorado Rapids also wore it after their cup run in 2010 for the 2011 season. Finally, the LA Galaxy wore the scudetto after winning MLS Cup in 2011, ironically, it was the last team to do so. After the 2012 season, MLS decided not to use the scudetto for upcoming season and instead the defending MLS Cup champions would have a gold star above one or more silver stars indicating the team's MLS Cup wins, followed by an additional silver star added to the lined stars the following season. The LA Galaxy were the first to receive the gold star above the team's three silver stars for the 2013 season.

=== "Buffalo Bills" of MLS ===
While the Galaxy won its second MLS Cup trophy and the Houston Dynamo earned consecutive cups, the New England Revolution went on a run of making three consecutive MLS Cup finals, losing all of them. Two of their three losses were in extra time, while the other was lost on penalty kicks. The infamy gave the club the title of being the Buffalo Bills (an NFL American football team) of MLS. This was in reference to the Buffalo Bills' Super Bowl games in the early 1990s, in which they lost in four consecutive appearances. In the 2005 final, the Revolution lost to the LA Galaxy, a rematch of the 2002 final. In a match held at Pizza Hut Park (now Toyota Stadium) in Frisco, Texas, the Galaxy defeated the Revolution by a score of 1–0 thanks to a 105th-minute overtime goal from Galaxy midfielder and Guatemalan international, Guillermo Ramírez. Ramírez's goal sealed the Galaxy's second MLS Cup title, and left the Revs searching once again.

In 2006, the championship was once again played in Frisco at Pizza Hut Park. This time the Revolution took on the Houston Dynamo. Both were coming off a successful season in which they fell short of winning the Supporters' Shield. A sellout crowd of 22,427 attended the match. Revolution forward Taylor Twellman scored an overtime goal in the 113th minute to give the Revolution the 1–0 lead. However, Dynamo captain and forward Brian Ching immediately tied the score following the Revolution's goal. The match went to penalties, in which the Dynamo won 4–3. This left the Revolution for a second consecutive year searching for league glory. It was also the first time in league history that a club lost consecutive MLS Cups.

In the 2007 final, the Revolution and Dynamo played each other once again for the 2007 cup. Played in Washington, D.C., at RFK Stadium, a crowd just shy of 40,000 witnessed the championship. The announced crowd of 39,859 made it the largest MLS Cup crowd since 2002. The Revolution had a successful season, earning its first U.S. Open Cup title. The Revolution wanted its first MLS Cup crown, and wanted to win its first "Double" in club history. Houston, finishing just shy once again to D.C. United of winning the MLS Supporters' Shield, was determined to finish its second season with some hardware, and to defend its MLS Cup title. The match went in the Revolution's favor early on, as the Revolution's captain, Twellman, netted in the 20th minute to give New England a 1–0 lead. However, midway through the second half, the Dynamo retaliated. Dynamo striker Joseph Ngwenya leveled things at one apiece in the 61st minute, and MLS Cup Man of the Match Dwayne De Rosario gave the Dynamo a 2–1 lead in the 74th. The goal proved to be the winning goal, as the Dynamo earned the first back-to-back MLS Cup titles since D.C. United in 1996 and 1997.

=== Underdogs winning the cup ===
Early in the 2008 Major League Soccer season, the league announced that the championship would be returning to The Home Depot Center (now known as Dignity Health Sports Park). Throughout the regular season, the league was dominated by the Columbus Crew, who finished the season with 57 points, and secured the Supporters' Shield title with three matches remaining before the 2008 MLS Cup Playoffs. Traditionally, the Shield winners only rarely made it to the league championship, in spite of usually being the heavy favorites going into the playoffs. However, for the first time in eight years, a regular season champion made it to MLS Cup. The Sigi Schmid-led club made their first run to the championship, along with their opponents the New York Red Bulls. The Red Bulls making the final was seen as a large surprise, possibly even a fluke. The Red Bulls did not qualify for the playoffs until the last day of the season, where they were the weakest team, in terms of regular season record, to do so. The match ended up being dominated by the Crew as Columbus defeated New York with ease, 3–1. The point gap between the two clubs was the largest in history, and the scoreline between the two clubs made it tied for the largest margin of victory in MLS Cup history. New York's run to the finals was further emphasized as a fluke when the club had the worst record in 2009.

The following championship saw two intra-conference clubs meet in the final for the second consecutive year, this time at Seattle's Qwest Field (later CenturyLink Field and now Lumen Field). The Western Conference regular season and postseason champions, LA Galaxy took on Real Salt Lake, who finished fifth in the West. Although the Sounders FC management had originally planned on capping the seats available in Qwest Field to 35,700, surging demand led to the release of an additional 10,000 seats, expanding the total capacity to roughly 45,700. The announced crowd was 46,011. The crowd size was the first championship crowd since 2002 to draw over 45,000 spectators. Televised on ESPN, it was the first time that the MLS championship match was televised on the cable network; the first thirteen were carried on ABC. In the 41st minute, Galaxy striker Mike Magee scored, only for Salt Lake's Robbie Findley to make the tying goal in the 61st. The stalemate was not broken in regulation nor overtime, requiring penalty kicks to decide the match. Thanks to a strike from Salt Lake's Robbie Russell, Salt Lake won their first major trophy. By winning the championship, they gained entry into the 2010–11 CONCACAF Champions League. There, they made it to the final, only to lose to Monterrey of Mexico.

At the 2010 season's end, six teams from the Western Conference qualified for the playoffs, whereas only two clubs from the East qualified, making it the largest disparity between the two conferences in league history. The league's seeding at the time awarded conference winners earned the top seeds, the two weakest Western Conference teams, San Jose Earthquakes and Colorado Rapids were seeded against the Eastern Conference champion, New York Red Bulls and runner-up Columbus Crew, respectively. Some cited this as an unfair advantage for the Rapids and Earthquakes, as both teams made the semi-finals. In the end, the Rapids played FC Dallas for MLS Cup 2010, winning 2–1 in overtime.

=== LA Galaxy dynasty ===
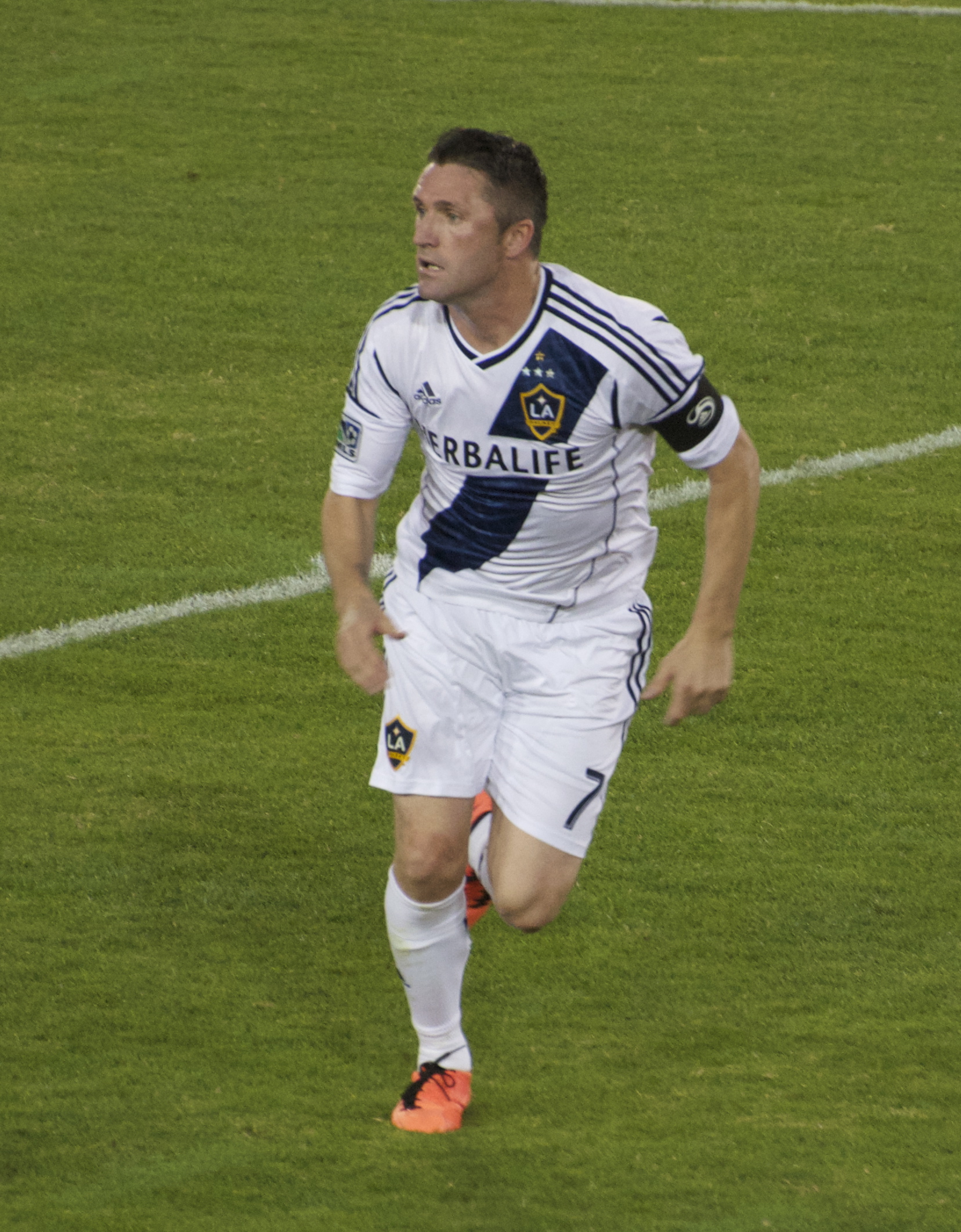
LA Galaxy captain Robbie Keane was the 2014 MLS Cup MVP.

Between the 2011 and 2014 MLS Cups, the LA Galaxy appeared in three MLS Cup finals, having the most success in MLS Cup in a short period of time since United's late 1990s dynasty. The only final that the Galaxy did not win, came in 2013, where they lost in the 2013 Western Conference semi-finals to eventual runner-up, Real Salt Lake. During that time, the Galaxy became the first MLS franchise to win five MLS Cups, when they won MLS Cup 2014. These teams contained several high-profile players including Landon Donovan, Robbie Keane, Gyasi Zardes, David Beckham and Omar Gonzalez.

Some claim that the Galaxy's dynasty began in 2009, when they reached the playoffs for the first time since 2005, and marched to the finals, only to lose on penalties to Real Salt Lake. In 2010, and again, in 2011, the Galaxy won consecutive Supporters' Shield, and completed the league double winning both the Shield and MLS Cup in 2011. This was the first time this had been accomplished since the Columbus Crew achieved it in 2008. In the 2011 MLS Cup final, the Galaxy defeated the Houston Dynamo, 1–0 off a 72nd minute Donovan goal. The goal was scored off a Galaxy counter where Beckham fed a through ball to Donovan who slotted it past Hall. The 2012 final featured both the Galaxy and Dynamo again, making it the first since 2007 that an MLS Cup final was a rematch of the previous final. Again, the Galaxy won the final, this time coming from behind to defeat the Dynamo by a 3–1 scoreline. The match was Beckham's final MLS match.

During the 2013 season, the Galaxy's chance to three-peat was thwarted by Real Salt Lake. Salt Lake defeated the Galaxy, 2–1 on aggregate, to advance to MLS Cup, where they eventually lost to Sporting Kansas City.

The following season, the Galaxy reached MLS Cup again, playing the New England Revolution, making it a rematch of MLS Cup 2002 and MLS Cup 2005. In extra-time a Robbie Keane goal propelled the Galaxy to their fifth MLS match, a victory in the 2014 MLS Cup.

=== Expansion teams from Cascadia, Canada, and Atlanta ===
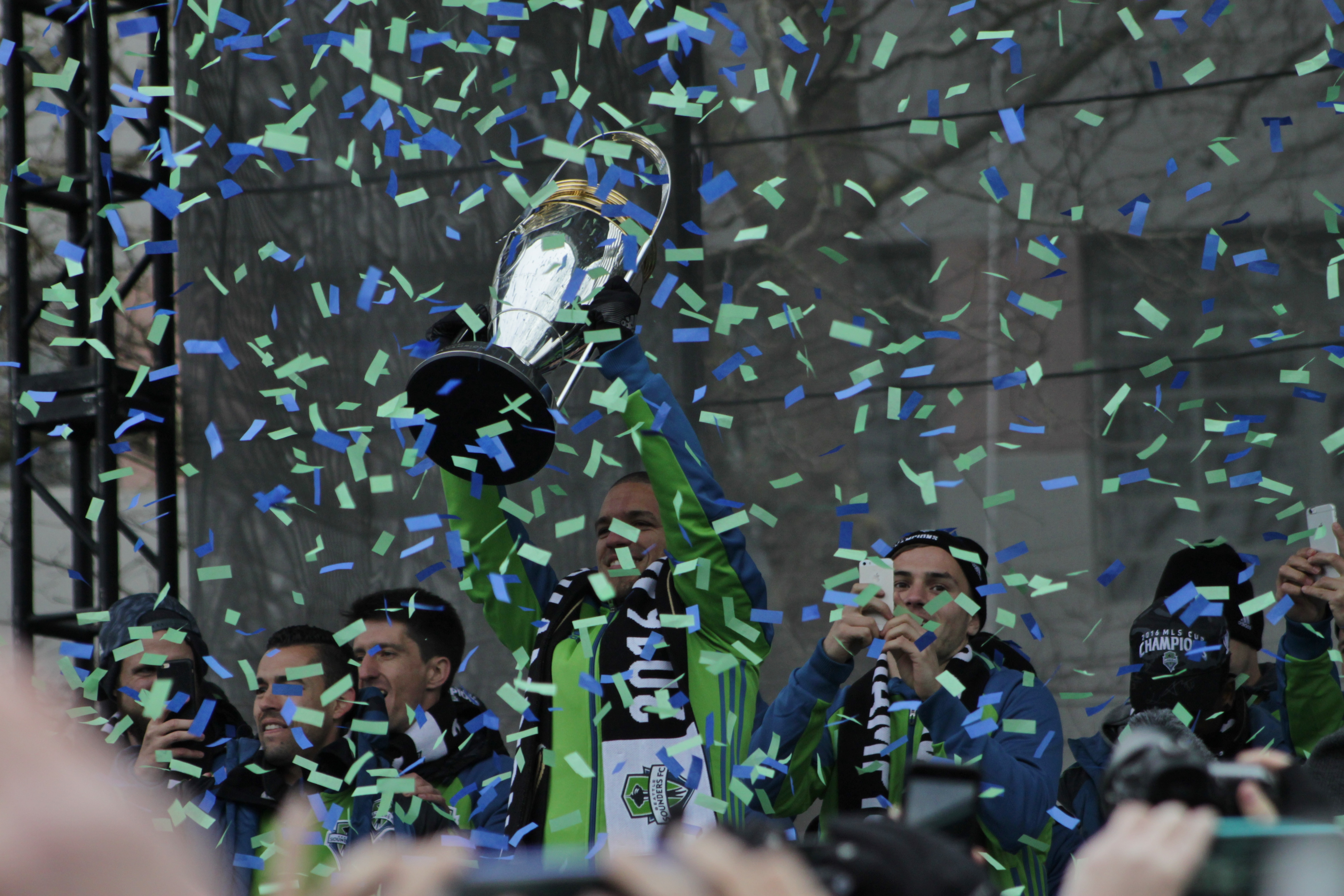
Osvaldo Alonso of Seattle Sounders FC lifting the MLS Cup trophy in December 2016

The Portland Timbers won the 2015 MLS Cup, defeating the Columbus Crew 2–1. Portland's Diego Valeri scored the fastest goal in MLS Cup history at 27 seconds when Crew goalkeeper Steve Clark made a fundamental error after he miscontrolled his defender's back-pass while Valeri had advanced towards the ball to strike at the opportunity.

The Seattle Sounders FC faced Toronto FC in the 2016 MLS Cup, which was played at BMO Field in Toronto on the evening of December 10, 2016. The temperature at the start of the match was 21 °F (−6 °C) (10 °F (−12 °C), when adjusted for wind chill), with strong winds coming off Lake Ontario. The field was watered shortly before the match, and resultant field was described as icy by players. Seattle Sounders FC defeated Toronto FC 5–4 in a penalty shootout after a scoreless match of 90 minutes regular time and 30 minutes overtime. The Sounders did not register a single shot on goal, becoming the first club to do so in an MLS Cup final. The Sounders, despite a very poor start and mid-season managerial change, became the second team from the Pacific Northwest to win the cup, after Portland in 2015.

In the 2017 MLS Cup, Toronto FC and Seattle faced off in a rematch of the previous edition, also at BMO Field. Toronto FC won the match 2–0, and became the first Canadian team to win MLS Cup, and the first MLS team to complete a domestic treble, after winning the Canadian Championship and Supporters' Shield earlier in the year.

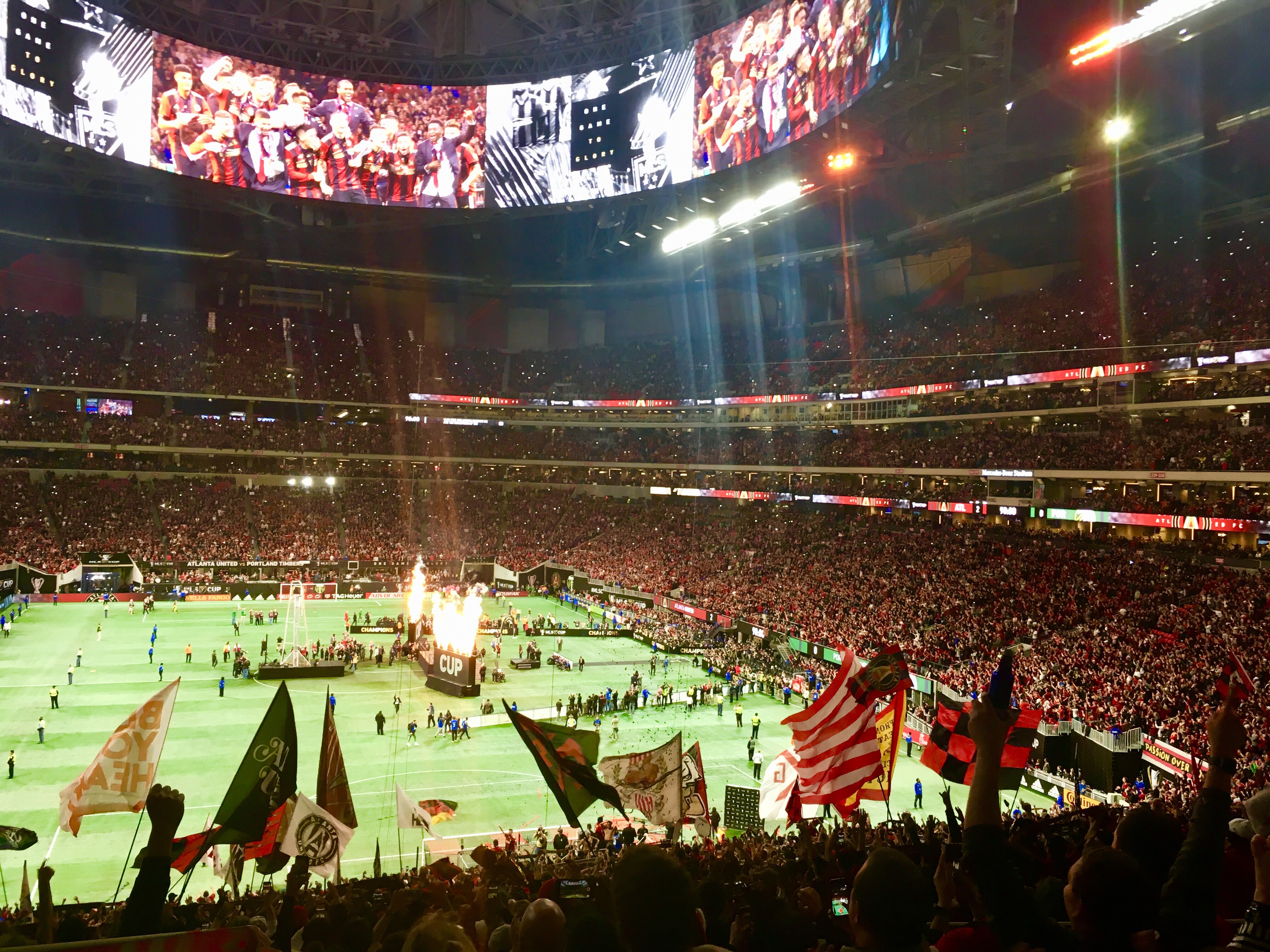
Pyrotechnics display during Atlanta United's trophy ceremony following the 2018 MLS Cup final

Atlanta United FC, in their second season as an expansion team, won the 2018 edition of MLS Cup by defeating the Portland Timbers 2–0. The match, hosted in Atlanta at Mercedes-Benz Stadium, was attended by 73,019 spectators and broke the MLS Cup attendance record set in 2002 by New England. The club became the second-youngest to win an MLS Cup, behind the 1998 Chicago Fire, and brought the first professional sports championship for the city of Atlanta since 1995.

In the 2019 MLS Cup, Toronto FC and Seattle Sounders FC both overcame underdog status in their respective conferences to contest a third final in four years, this time playing at Seattle's home ground. Seattle Sounders FC duly won their second MLS Cup, taking the final match 3–1 at CenturyLink Field in front of a Sounders record attendance of 69,274.

The 2020 edition, which marked the end of a season dramatically affected by the COVID-19 pandemic, saw the Sounders return to MLS Cup, this time facing Columbus Crew at the latter's home of Mapfre Stadium in Columbus, Ohio. The Crew won 3–0 in front of a crowd restricted to 1,500, in the stadium's last playoff game. From 2021 through 2025, MLS Cup has had parity- zero repeat champions across this time. Below is a list of Champs, year by year: 2021: New York City FC 2022: Los Angeles FC 2023: Columbus Crew 2024: LA Galaxy 2025: Inter Miami CF

== Broadcasting ==
=== United States ===
MLS Cup was aired on English-language networks ABC from 1996 to 2008 and ESPN from 2009 to 2014. ESPN/ABC and Fox alternate as MLS Cup Final broadcasters since 2015, with the MLS Cup 2019 on ABC, their first MLS match since 2008. ABC also air four playoff matches including the MLS Cup 2021. MLS Cup has also been aired on Spanish-language networks TeleFutura in 2007 and 2008, Galavision from 2009 to 2011, TeleFutura/UniMás from 2012 to 2018, and Univision in 2019. ABC previously had Spanish announcers under secondary audio program.

From 2015 to 2022, all MLS Cup playoff games are televised on ESPN, Fox Sports, or Univisión networks. UniMás will air two exclusive playoff matches, while ESPN and its affiliated networks will split the rest of the contests – including MLS Cup – with Fox Sports. Univision, UniMás and TUDN also airs the MLS Cup playoffs in Spanish.

With the new Apple TV deal beginning 2023, FOX Sports will be the only linear broadcaster of MLS, and will carry select MLS Cup playoff matches, and every MLS Cup with no alternate broadcaster starting 2023.

=== Canada ===
MLS Cup coverage in Canada started in 2007, with the addition of Toronto FC to the league. MLS Cup bounced around different networks in the first three seasons of the league's presence in Canada; what was then the bold network aired the 2007 Cup Final, with CBC airing the next year's Final and GolTV Canada airing the Final the year after that. Since 2010, TSN has aired MLS Cup on its networks; this includes Toronto FC's victory in 2017.

In French, RDS has exclusive rights to MLS, and thus MLS Cup.

== Format ==
Over the history of the MLS Cup playoffs, numerous formats have been used.

From 1996 to 1999 and 2003 to 2006, the top four teams per conference qualified for the playoffs.

In 2000 and 2001, the three division winners plus the next five teams with the next best records made the playoffs.

In 2002, the top 8 teams qualified for the playoffs regardless of conference.

In 2007, the top two teams per conference plus the next four teams with the next most points qualified.

At the end of the 2008 season, the top three teams of each conference made the playoffs; in addition, the clubs with the next two highest point totals, regardless of conference, were added to the playoffs. In the first round of this knockout tournament, aggregate goals over two matches determined the winners; the Conference Championships were one match each, with the winner of each conference advancing to MLS Cup. In all rounds, the tie-breaking method was two 15-minute periods of overtime, followed by penalty kicks if necessary. The away goals rule was not used.

At the end of the 2009 and 2010 seasons, the top two teams of each conference made the playoffs; in addition, the clubs with the next four highest point totals, regardless of conference, were added to the playoffs. In the first round of this knockout tournament, aggregate (total) goals over two matches determined the winners; the Conference Championships were one match each, with the winner of each conference advancing to MLS Cup. In all rounds, the tie-breaking method was two 15-minute periods of extra time, followed by penalty kicks if necessary. The away goals rule was not used.

At the 2011 season's end, the top three clubs in each of the league's two conferences earned the six automatic spots in the Conference Semifinals. The wild card entrants, seeded seventh through tenth, entered based upon their overall position in the overall league standings. The new format was assembled so that the lowest seed to qualify out of the wild card rounds will play against the Supporters' Shield winner. The highest wild-card seed remaining will play the conference champion that did not win the Shield. The play-in games and Conference Finals were single matches, with the higher-seeded club hosting. The conference semi-finals were a two-leg aggregate series. MLS Cup was held at a predetermined venue.

From 2012 to 2014, the playoff structure was further tweaked with the elimination of the wild card slots. The ten playoff berths were awarded to the top five teams in each conference. In each conference, the No. 4 seeded hosted the No. 5 seed in a single match for a place in the conference semi-finals against the best team in its conference. The Conference Semifinals remained two-legged while the finals changed from a single match to a two-leg aggregate series. Finally, MLS Cup was held at the home field of the finalist with the highest point total during the regular season. The away goals rule was used but did not apply after extra time.

From 2015 to 2018, the top six teams per conference qualified for the playoffs (12 total teams). The first round involved each conference's No. 3 seed hosting the No. 6 seed, and the No. 4 hosting No. 5. In the Conference Semifinals, the top seed played the lowest remaining seed, and the No. 2 seed played the next lowest seed.

In the 2019, 2021, and 2022 seasons, the top seven teams per conference qualified for the playoffs, with only the best-ranked team in each conference earning a first-round bye. Each round is still single-elimination. The playoff brackets were fixed, as the league abolished re-seeding. Due to the COVID-19 pandemic, the top ten teams from the Eastern and top eight teams from the Western conference qualified for the playoffs in the 2020 season, with single-elimination remaining intact. The top six Eastern teams earned byes to the first round while teams seeded 7–10 and competed in play-in games. The lowest-ranked team to advance from the play-in round advanced to play the conference's first-placed team while the highest-ranked remaining team from that round advanced to face the conference's runner-up. In the Western Conference, the top eight teams competed in their first round with no byes.

The playoffs expanded to nine teams per conference in 2023 with the re-addition of a best-of-three series. The eighth and ninth seeds play a wild card match, with the winner advancing to face the best-ranked team in their conference in Round One while teams ranked 2–7 face each other, with the higher seed hosting. The Conference Semifinals, Conference Final, and MLS Cup final remain single-elimination matches hosted by the team with the better regular season record in late November and early December; as before, without re-seeding.

== Sponsorship ==
Since the 2023 edition, the presenting sponsor of MLS Cup has been German automotive company Audi. (Note: On the official MLS website, etc., it is sometimes referred to as MLS Cup Presented by Audi, along with the sponsor's name.) The company had already been the presenting sponsor of the MLS Cup playoffs and the MLS Golden Boot.

== Champions ==
The winner of Major League Soccer's MLS Cup, the final match of the MLS Cup Playoffs, determines that season's league champion. The playoff tournament is organized by the league at the conclusion of the regular season in a format similar to other North American professional sports leagues. The tournament is open to the top nine clubs of the Eastern and Western Conferences.

The first MLS Cup final was played on October 20, 1996. To date, the record for the most championships is held by the LA Galaxy with six cup titles. The record for the most championships lost is held by the New England Revolution, who lost the game five times during their history, while winning none. The championship has been won by the same team in two or more consecutive years on three occasions.

== Records and statistics ==
=== MLS Cup titles ===
As of 2025, 21 of the 32 teams that have played in the league have appeared at an MLS Cup final, and 16 have won a championship. The LA Galaxy has appeared at and won MLS Cup the most times, with six championships in ten appearances. The New England Revolution has appeared five times as a finalist, but has not won an MLS Cup. The Chicago Fire won MLS Cup in their inaugural season in 1998; joining the 1973 Philadelphia Atoms, 1974 Los Angeles Aztecs, and 1975 Tampa Bay Rowdies of the NASL as the only previous professional American soccer teams to win a league championship in their inaugural season.

Apps	Team (Note: Teams are listed by their official name at the time of their most recent final.)	Champion(s)	Runners-up	Win %	Years of appearance (in MLS Cup Finals)
10	LA Galaxy	6	4	.600	1996, 1999, 2001, 2002, 2005, 2009, 2011, 2012, 2014, 2024
5	D.C. United	4	1	.800	1996, 1997, 1998, 1999, 2004
4	Columbus Crew	3	1	.750	2008, 2015, 2020, 2023
4	Houston Dynamo FC	2	2	.500	2006, 2007, 2011, 2012
4	Seattle Sounders FC	2	2	.500	2016, 2017, 2019, 2020
3	Sporting Kansas City	2	1	.667	2000, 2004, 2013
2	San Jose Earthquakes	2	0	1.00	2001, 2003
3	Chicago Fire FC	1	2	.333	1998, 2000, 2003
3	Portland Timbers	1	2	.333	2015, 2018, 2021
3	Toronto FC	1	2	.333	2016, 2017, 2019
2	Colorado Rapids	1	1	.500	1997, 2010
2	Real Salt Lake	1	1	.500	2009, 2013
2	Los Angeles FC	1	1	.500	2022, 2023
1	Inter Miami CF	1	0	1.00	2025
1	Atlanta United FC	1	0	1.00	2018
1	New York City FC	1	0	1.00	2021
5	New England Revolution	0	5	.000	2002, 2005, 2006, 2007, 2014
2	New York Red Bulls	0	2	.000	2008, 2024
1	FC Dallas	0	1	.000	2010
1	Philadelphia Union	0	1	.000	2022
1	Vancouver Whitecaps FC	0	1	.000	2025

=== MLS Cup finalists records in CONCACAF competition ===
For most of the league's history, only U.S. teams were eligible to fill MLS based qualification slots for CONCACAF competitions. Canadian teams, even MLS Cup participants, had to qualify by winning the separate Canadian Championship; as of 2025, the only Canadian winner has been 2017 MLS Cup champion Toronto FC, who also won the Canadian Championship that year. However, starting with the 2024 CONCACAF Champions Cup, Canadian clubs could qualify via MLS slots.

Key

Champions	Runners-up	Semifinals or consolation match

- QR1 = Qualification first round
- PR = Preliminary round
- GS = Group stage
- R16 = Round of 16
- QF = Quarterfinals
- SF = Semifinals or consolation match
- CON = Consolation match
- F = Final

Year	MLS Cup champions	Result	MLS Cup runners-up	Result
1997	D.C. United	CON	LA Galaxy	F
1998	D.C. United	F	Colorado Rapids	QR1
1999	Chicago Fire	CON	D.C. United	CON
2000	D.C. United	CON	LA Galaxy	F
2002	Kansas City Wizards	SF	did not qualify	
2002	San Jose Earthquakes	QF	Chicago Fire	QF
2003	D.C. United	SF	Kansas City Wizards	QF
2006	LA Galaxy	QF	New England Revolution	QF
2007	Houston Dynamo	SF	did not qualify	
2008	Houston Dynamo	SF	did not qualify	
2008–09	Houston Dynamo	QF	New England Revolution	PR
2009–10	Columbus Crew	QF	New York Red Bulls	PR
2010–11	Real Salt Lake	F	LA Galaxy	PR
2011–12	Colorado Rapids	GS	FC Dallas	GS
2012–13	LA Galaxy	SF	Houston Dynamo	QF
2013–14	LA Galaxy	QF	Houston Dynamo	GS
2014–15	Sporting Kansas City	GS	Real Salt Lake	GS
2015–16	LA Galaxy	QF	did not qualify	
2016–17	Portland Timbers	GS	did not qualify	
2018	Toronto FC	F	Seattle Sounders FC	QF
2019	Atlanta United FC	QF	did not qualify	
2020	Seattle Sounders FC	R16	did not qualify	
2021	Columbus Crew	QF	did not qualify	
2022	New York City FC	SF	did not qualify	
2023	Los Angeles FC	F	Philadelphia Union	SF
2024	Columbus Crew	F	did not qualify	
2025	LA Galaxy	QF	did not qualify	
2026	Inter Miami CF	R16	Vancouver Whitecaps FC	R16

Notes

1. 1: The 2001 CONCACAF Champions' Cup was canceled, so both MLS Cup 2000 winner, Kansas City Wizards and the MLS Cup 2001 winner, San Jose Earthquakes qualified for the 2002 CONCACAF Champions Cup.
2. 2: Toronto FC qualified by winning the 2016 and 2017 editions of the Canadian Championship.
3. 3: Seattle Sounders FC qualified as the winners of MLS Cup 2016.

== Trophies ==
The Alan I. Rothenberg Trophy, first version (1996–1998) and second version (1999–2007)

Culminating the championship, the winning team is presented with a trophy, known as the Philip F. Anschutz Trophy, named for the contributions and investment to American soccer and MLS by Philip Anschutz. Typically, the award presentation is held on a podium in the center of the field, where the league commissioner will award the team with the cup.

Before the actual award presentation, the finalists are awarded with silver medals with the league's logo imprinted on them. The champions are then presented with gold medals, before the trophy is handed to the winning team's captain.

In cup history, the MLS Cup champions have been awarded with three different trophies. For the first three MLS Cup finals, the winning team was awarded with the Alan I. Rothenberg Trophy, named for Rothenberg's contributions to American soccer. The Rothenberg Trophy was a dark gold trophy that had two handles around a soccer ball, with the league's logo imprinted on the plaque. In 1999, the Rothenberg Trophy was redesigned with a soccer ball placed on a beacon. In 2008, the trophy was redesigned again to its present state and renamed the Philip F. Anschutz Trophy.

== Venues ==
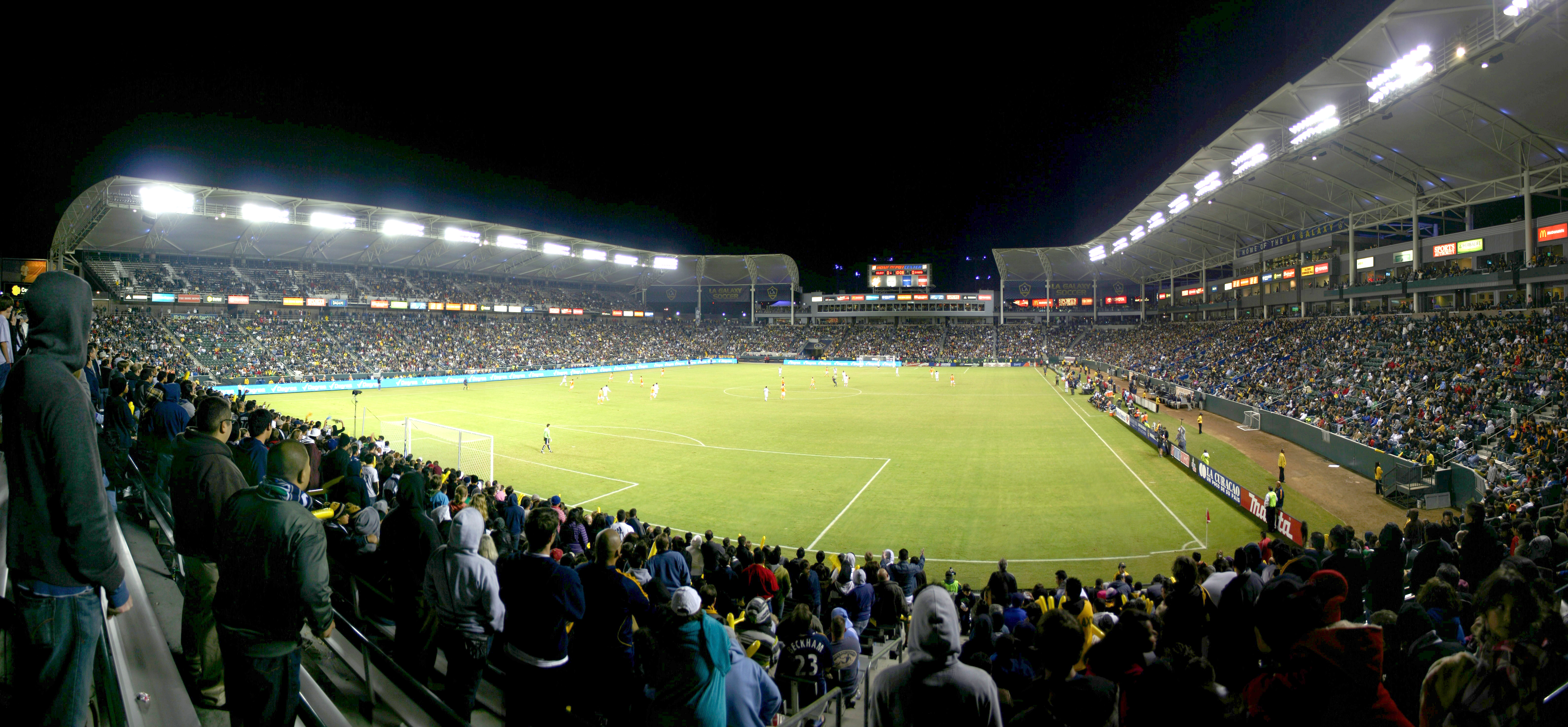
Dignity Health Sports Park has hosted six MLS Cup finals.

In MLS Cup history, eight matches have been played in the Greater Los Angeles area (once at the Rose Bowl in Pasadena, California, six times at Dignity Health Sports Park (formerly StubHub Center and Home Depot Center) in Carson, California, and once at Banc of California Stadium). Columbus, Ohio is alone in second place having hosted MLS Cup final 4 times (3 held at the Historic Crew Stadium and one at Lower.com Field). Three markets are tied for having hosted MLS Cup the third-most number of times, with three matches each: the Greater Boston metro area (twice contested at Foxboro Stadium and once at Gillette Stadium, both in Foxborough, Massachusetts), Washington, D.C. (all played at RFK Stadium), and Toronto (all held at BMO Field).

Through the 2011 season every MLS Cup had been played at a predetermined site (i.e., announced before the playoff participants were known). On the day before the 2011 Cup, MLS announced that starting in 2012, Cup finals would be hosted by the participant with the highest point total during the regular season. As is the case with awarding the Supporters' Shield, if the two finalists are tied on points, the team with the most wins hosts the final. For example, at MLS Cup 2022, Los Angeles FC and the Philadelphia Union both finished with 67 points, but LAFC had two more wins and thus hosted the final.

Before the 2012 Cup and the change to awarding the final to the participant with the higher point total, only three teams played the match on their home field. In the 1997 MLS Cup final, D.C. United won the match in their home stadium over Colorado Rapids, RFK Stadium. The same occurrence applied in the 2002 MLS Cup final, where the LA Galaxy defeated the New England Revolution 1–0, in the Revolution's home stadium Gillette Stadium. As a result, the 1997 and 2002 MLS Cup finals drew the largest crowds in MLS Cup history prior to the 2012 change to the higher point total hosting. In 2011, the LA Galaxy won their 2011 MLS Cup match in their home stadium (Home Depot Center), 1–0, over the Houston Dynamo. The Galaxy became the second team (and first since D.C. United in 1997) to win the Cup at home.

After MLS adopted its current criteria for awarding the MLS Cup match, the first three Cup finals were won by the hosts. The 2012 MLS Cup saw a rematch of the 2011 Cup at the same site, with the Galaxy successfully defending the title with a 3–1 win. In 2013, Sporting Kansas City became the third team to win the cup in their home stadium (Sporting Park) when they beat Real Salt Lake in the penalty kicks, which was the longest shootout in MLS Cup history. Then, in 2014, the Galaxy defeated the New England Revolution 2–1 at the renamed StubHub Center in a match that was also notable as the final competitive match for U.S. national team all-time leading goal scorer Landon Donovan. The pattern was broken in 2015, however, when the Portland Timbers defeated the Columbus Crew in the Crew's home stadium.

Through the 2011 season, MLS typically announced the championship location either prior to the start of its respective season, or even a few weeks into the campaign. For the 2011 championship, the league selected Home Depot Center in Carson, California, making it a fourth time the league's championship had been hosted at the venue.

To date, the coldest MLS Cup final was the 2013 championship game played in Kansas City, Kansas at Sporting Kansas City's Sporting Park where the temperature was 20 °F (−7 °C). The hottest MLS Cup final was the 2005 championship game played in Frisco, Texas at FC Dallas's Pizza Hut Park where the temperature was 75 °F (23 °C).

The 2010 edition of MLS Cup was the first final in league history to be played outside of the United States. The match was played in Canada at Toronto's BMO Field, the home ground of MLS club Toronto FC.

=== Stadiums ===
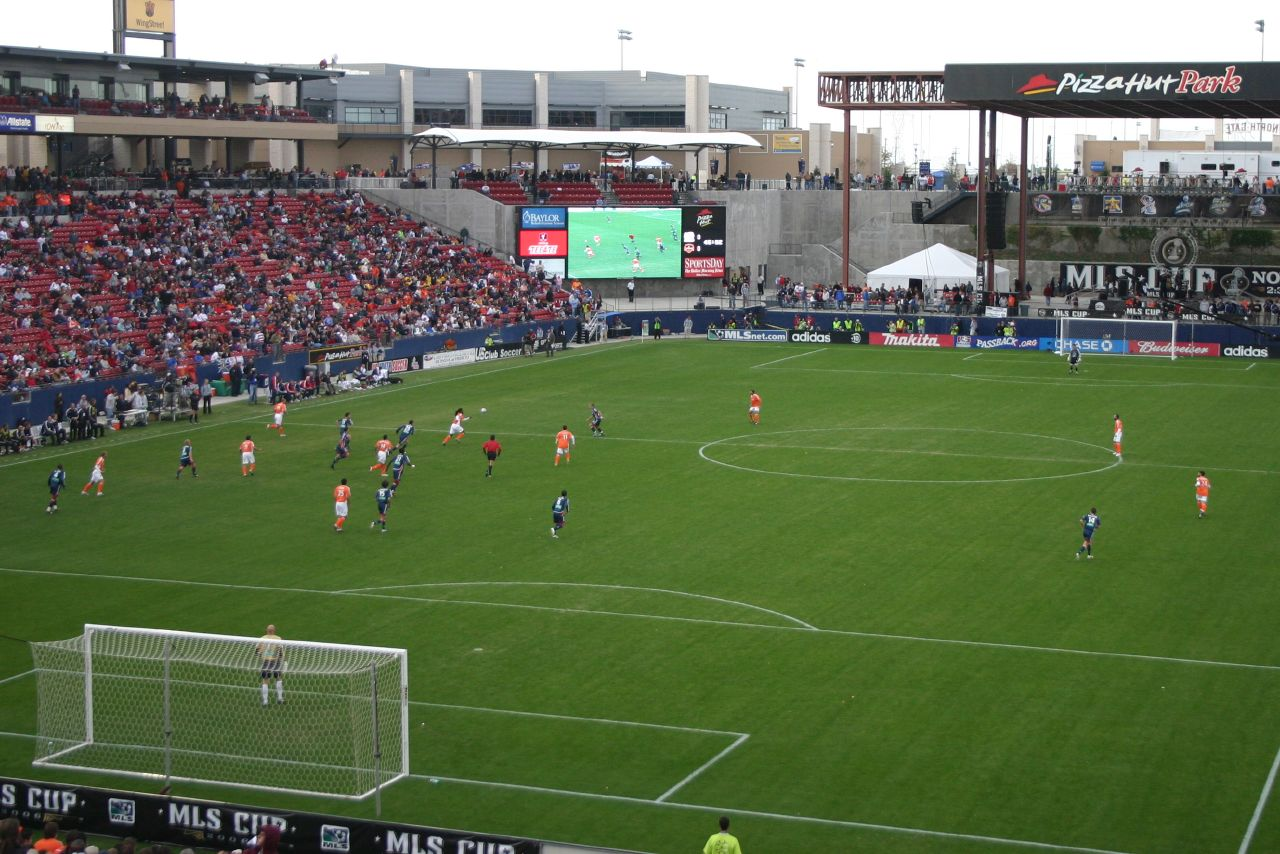
Pizza Hut Park, now Toyota Stadium, hosted the 2005 and 2006 MLS Cups.

Name	Location	Hosted	Years hosted
Dignity Health Sports Park (Note: Known as Home Depot Center prior to the 2013 season and StubHub Center in 2014.)	Carson, California	7	2003, 2004, 2008, 2011, 2012, 2014, 2024
RFK Stadium	Washington, D.C.	3	1997, 2000, 2007
BMO Field	Toronto, Ontario	3	2010, 2016, 2017
Historic Crew Stadium (Note: Known as Columbus Crew Stadium prior to the 2015 season and MAPFRE Stadium from 2015 to 2020. The sponsorship contract with MAPFRE did not end until after MLS Cup 2020. The Crew moved its home matches to the new Lower.com Field early in the 2021 season.)	Columbus, Ohio	3	2001, 2015, 2020
Lumen Field (Note: Known as Qwest Field in 2009 and CenturyLink Field in 2019.)	Seattle, Washington	2	2009, 2019
Toyota Stadium (Note: Known as Pizza Hut Park in 2005 and 2006.)	Frisco, Texas	2	2005, 2006
Foxboro Stadium	Foxborough, Massachusetts	2	1996, 1999
Children's Mercy Park (Note: Known as Sporting Park in 2013.)	Kansas City, Kansas	1	2013
Gillette Stadium	Foxborough, Massachusetts	1	2002
Mercedes-Benz Stadium	Atlanta, Georgia	1	2018
Providence Park	Portland, Oregon	1	2021
Rose Bowl	Pasadena, California	1	1998
BMO Stadium (Note: Known as Banc of California Stadium prior to the 2023 season.)	Los Angeles, California	1	2022
ScottsMiracle-Gro Field (Note: Known as Lower.com Field prior to the 2026 season.)	Columbus, Ohio	1	2023
Chase Stadium	Fort Lauderdale, Florida	1	2025

Italics indicate a stadium that is now inactive.

== Players with multiple MLS Cup titles ==
At least 40 players have won two MLS Cups, mostly for teams with sequential or near-sequential titles (D.C. 1996–1999, San Jose 2001 and 2003, LA Galaxy 2002 and 2005, and 2011–2012, and Houston 2006–2007). Brian Mullan is the only player to have won the Cup with four different teams, while players that have won it with three different teams include: Craig Waibel, Alejandro Moreno, Ezra Hendrickson, and Darlington Nagbe.

MLS Cups	Players (years won)
6	Landon Donovan (2001, 2003, 2005, 2011, 2012, 2014)
5	Jeff Agoos (1996, 1997, 1999, 2001, 2003); Todd Dunivant (2003, 2005, 2011, 2012, 2014); Brian Mullan (2002, 2003, 2006, 2007, 2010)
4	Jaime Moreno (1996, 1997, 1999, 2004); Craig Waibel (2002, 2003, 2006, 2007); Dwayne De Rosario (2001, 2003, 2006, 2007); Eddie Robinson (2001, 2003, 2006, 2007); Josh Saunders (2003, 2005, 2011, 2012); Darlington Nagbe (2015, 2018, 2020, 2023)
3	Richard Mulrooney (2001, 2003, 2007); Marco Etcheverry (1996, 1997, 1999); Brian Kamler (1996, 1997, 1999); John Maessner (1996, 1997, 1999); Clint Peay (1996, 1997, 1999); Eddie Pope (1996, 1997, 1999); Richie Williams (1996, 1997, 1999); Chris Albright (1999, 2002, 2005); Brian Ching (2003, 2006, 2007); Jesse Marsch (1996, 1997, 1998); Alejandro Moreno (2002, 2006, 2008); Ezra Hendrickson (2002, 2004, 2008); Pat Onstad (2003, 2006, 2007); Chad Marshall (2008, 2016, 2019); Juninho (2011, 2012, 2014); Omar Gonzalez (2011, 2012, 2014); Robbie Keane (2011, 2012, 2014); A. J. DeLaGarza (2011, 2012, 2014); Leonardo (2011, 2012, 2014); Hector Jiménez (2011, 2012, 2020)

== See also ==
- MLS Cup Playoffs
- MLS rivalry cups
- Campeones Cup
- CONCACAF Champions Cup
- List of MLS Cup broadcasters
- List of MLS Cup finals
- List of MLS club post-season droughts
- List of MLS Cup referees
- List of MLS Cup winning head coaches

== Notes and references ==
General

- Dure, Beau (May 31, 2010). Long-Range Goals: The Success Story of Major League Soccer. Potomac Books. ISBN 978-1-59797-509-4.
