= List of MLS Cup finals =

List of Major League Soccer championship games and their finalists

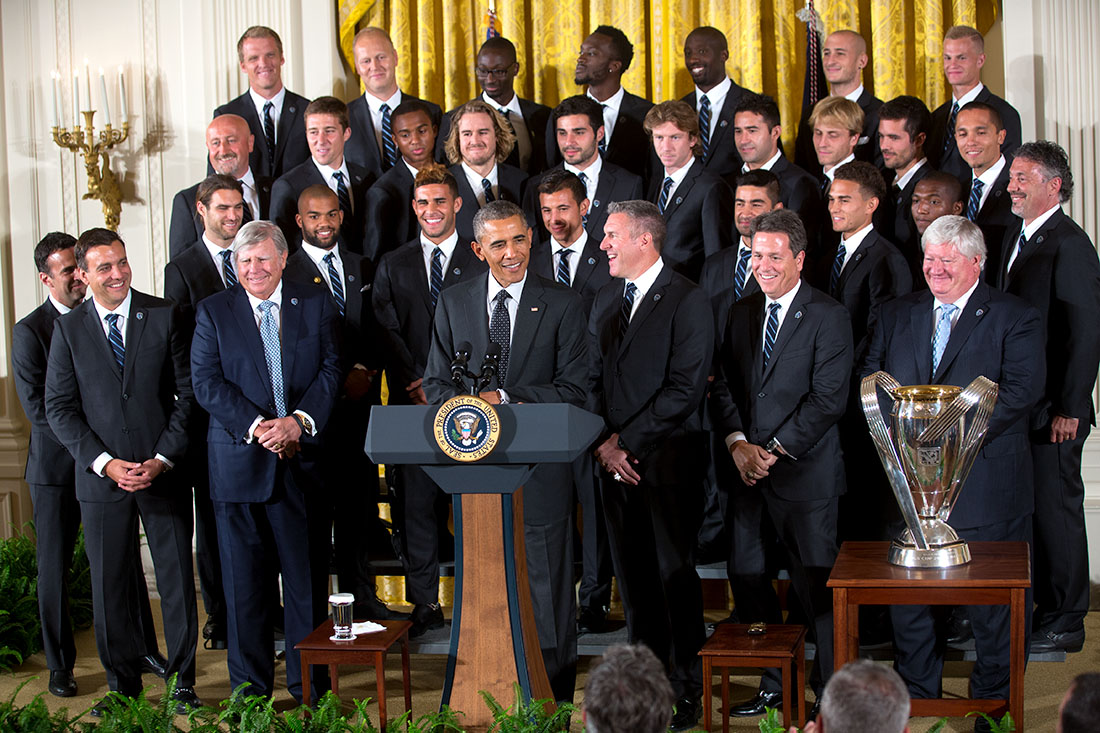
Sporting Kansas City, winners of MLS Cup 2013, are hosted by President Barack Obama at the White House.

The MLS Cup is the annual championship match of Major League Soccer (MLS), the top-level men's soccer league for the United States and Canada. The match marks the conclusion of the MLS Cup playoffs, a five-round knockout competition contested by the top nine teams from each of the league's two conferences. The playoffs tournament is organized by the league at the end of the regular season in a format which is similar to other major professional sports leagues in the United States and Canada, but unlike most soccer leagues. The league also awards the Supporters' Shield to teams that have the most points during the regular season. Both the MLS Cup champion and Supporters' Shield winner qualify for the CONCACAF Champions Cup, contested by the champions of CONCACAF leagues in North America, Central America, and the Caribbean. The MLS Cup champion also qualifies for the Campeones Cup, a friendly held since 2018 against the winners of the Mexican Campeón de Campeones from Liga MX.

First contested in 1996, the MLS Cup was originally hosted by a predetermined neutral site selected by the league before the regular season. Since the 2012 edition, the match has been hosted by the remaining team with the highest regular season standing. The final, originally contested in October, was moved to November and later December as the length of the regular season and playoffs were extended by the league. The playoffs originally allowed for lower-ranked seeds, known as wild cards, to be placed into different sides of the bracket regardless of their actual conference. As a result, several MLS Cups have featured two teams from the same conference.

Inter Miami CF are the reigning cup-holders, having defeated Vancouver Whitecaps FC in the 2025 final for their first title. The LA Galaxy hold the record for most MLS Cup titles, having won six times in ten appearances. The championship has been won by the same team in two or more consecutive years on three occasions, and the match has featured consecutive sets of finalists on three occasions. Five finals have featured two teams participating as finalists for the first time. Nine teams have also won "the double", claiming the MLS Cup and either the Supporters' Shield, the U.S. Open Cup, or the Canadian Championship during the same season; only Toronto FC has won a treble, having achieved it in 2017. Landon Donovan has played in seven MLS Cup finals and totaled 726 minutes—both competition records.

The highest recorded attendance for the MLS Cup was set in the 2018 final, with 73,019 spectators at Mercedes-Benz Stadium in Atlanta, Georgia. From 1996 to 2008, the English broadcast of the MLS Cup was carried in the United States on terrestrial network ABC; it was moved to sister channel ESPN for the following seven editions. From 2015 to 2022, ESPN and Fox held rights to alternating editions of the cup; the 2019 cup, originally slated to be broadcast on ESPN, was moved to ABC. The Spanish language rights for the MLS Cup in the U.S. were awarded to Univision in 2007 and the match was aired on their various networks until 2023. The U.S. linear television rights beginning in 2023 are held by Fox in English and Fox Deportes in Spanish; the MLS Cup final will air on those channels as well as Apple TV+'s MLS Season Pass streaming service worldwide. In Canada, the MLS Cup has been broadcast in English by TSN since 2011 and in French by TVA Sports since 2017. The largest television audience for an MLS Cup broadcast was the 2016 final, which drew 3.5 million viewers in the United States and Canada.

== Finals ==
Key
†	Match went to extra time
‡	Match decided by a penalty shootout after extra time
§	Team also won the Supporters' Shield
*	Team also won a national cup competition (the U.S. Open Cup or the Canadian Championship)
Italics	Team won both a Supporters' Shield and a national cup competition

MLS Cup finals
Season	Date	Winners	Score	Runners–up	Venue	City	Attendance	U.S. TV broadcasters	U.S. TV viewership
1996	October 20	D.C. United *	3–2 † (Note: This final was decided by a golden goal in extra time.)	Los Angeles Galaxy	Foxboro Stadium	Foxborough, Massachusetts	34,643	ABC	2.11 million
1997	October 26	D.C. United §	2–1	Colorado Rapids	RFK Memorial Stadium	Washington, D.C.	57,431	ABC	2.22 million
1998	October 25	Chicago Fire *	2–0	D.C. United	Rose Bowl	Pasadena, California	51,350	ABC	1.12 million
1999	November 21	D.C. United §	2–0	Los Angeles Galaxy	Foxboro Stadium	Foxborough, Massachusetts	44,910	ABC	1.16 million
2000	October 15	Kansas City Wizards §	1–0	Chicago Fire *	RFK Memorial Stadium	Washington, D.C.	39,159	ABC	867,000
2001	October 21	San Jose Earthquakes	2–1 †	Los Angeles Galaxy	Crew Stadium	Columbus, Ohio	21,626	ABC	1.50 million
2002	October 20	Los Angeles Galaxy §	1–0 †	New England Revolution	Gillette Stadium	Foxborough, Massachusetts	61,316	ABC	1.17 million
2003	November 23	San Jose Earthquakes	4–2	Chicago Fire § *	Home Depot Center	Carson, California	27,000	ABC	876,000
2004	November 14	D.C. United	3–2	Kansas City Wizards *	Home Depot Center	Carson, California	25,797	ABC	1.06 million
2005	November 13	Los Angeles Galaxy *	1–0 †	New England Revolution	Pizza Hut Park	Frisco, Texas	21,193	ABC	1.14 million
2006	November 12	Houston Dynamo	1–1 ‡ (4–3 p)	New England Revolution	Pizza Hut Park	Frisco, Texas	22,427	ABC	1.25 million
2007	November 18	Houston Dynamo	2–1	New England Revolution *	RFK Memorial Stadium	Washington, D.C.	39,859	ABC, TeleFutura	1.45 million
2008	November 23	Columbus Crew §	3–1	New York Red Bulls	Home Depot Center	Carson, California	27,000	ABC, TeleFutura	1.23 million
2009	November 22	Real Salt Lake	1–1 ‡ (5–4 p)	LA Galaxy	Qwest Field	Seattle, Washington	46,011	ESPN, Galavisión	1.63 million
2010	November 21	Colorado Rapids	2–1 †	FC Dallas	BMO Field	Toronto, Ontario	21,700	ESPN, Galavisión	980,000
2011	November 20	LA Galaxy §	1–0	Houston Dynamo	Home Depot Center	Carson, California	30,281	ESPN, Galavisión	1.35 million
2012	December 1	LA Galaxy	3–1	Houston Dynamo	Home Depot Center	Carson, California	30,510	ESPN, TeleFutura	1.28 million
2013	December 7	Sporting Kansas City	1–1 ‡ (7–6 p)	Real Salt Lake	Sporting Park	Kansas City, Kansas	21,650	ESPN, UniMás	1.02 million
2014	December 7	LA Galaxy	2–1 †	New England Revolution	StubHub Center	Carson, California	27,000	ESPN, UniMás	1.64 million
2015	December 6	Portland Timbers	2–1	Columbus Crew SC	Mapfre Stadium	Columbus, Ohio	21,747	ESPN, UniMás	1.17 million
2016	December 10	Seattle Sounders FC	0–0 ‡ (5–4 p)	Toronto FC *	BMO Field	Toronto, Ontario	36,045	Fox, UniMás	2.01 million
2017	December 9	Toronto FC § *	2–0	Seattle Sounders FC	BMO Field	Toronto, Ontario	30,584	ESPN, UniMás	1.12 million
2018	December 8	Atlanta United FC	2–0	Portland Timbers	Mercedes-Benz Stadium	Atlanta, Georgia	73,019	Fox, UniMás	1.77 million
2019	November 10	Seattle Sounders FC	3–1	Toronto FC	CenturyLink Field	Seattle, Washington	69,274	ABC, Univision	1.27 million
2020	December 12 (Note: The 2020 final was originally scheduled for November 7, but was delayed to December 12 and played in front of a limited-capacity crowd due to the COVID-19 pandemic.)	Columbus Crew SC	3–0	Seattle Sounders FC	Mapfre Stadium	Columbus, Ohio	1,500	Fox, UniMás	1.57 million
2021	December 11	New York City FC	1–1 ‡ (4–2 p)	Portland Timbers	Providence Park	Portland, Oregon	25,218	ABC, UniMás	1.56 million
2022	November 5	Los Angeles FC §	3–3 ‡ (3–0 p)	Philadelphia Union	Banc of California Stadium	Los Angeles, California	22,384	Fox, Univision	2.15 million
2023	December 9	Columbus Crew	2–1	Los Angeles FC	Lower.com Field	Columbus, Ohio	20,802	MLS Season Pass (Apple), Fox, Fox Deportes	900,000
2024	December 7	LA Galaxy	2–1	New York Red Bulls	Dignity Health Sports Park	Carson, California	26,812	MLS Season Pass (Apple), Fox, Fox Deportes	468,000
2025	December 6	Inter Miami CF	3–1	Vancouver Whitecaps FC *	Chase Stadium	Fort Lauderdale, Florida	21,556	MLS Season Pass (Apple), Fox, Fox Deportes	4.6 million

== Results by team ==
As of 2025, 33 teams have played in the league, 21 of whom have appeared in an MLS Cup final, including 16 that have won a championship. The LA Galaxy has appeared at and won the MLS Cup the most times, with six championships in ten appearances. The New England Revolution has appeared five times as a finalist, but has not won an MLS Cup. The Chicago Fire won the MLS Cup in their inaugural season in 1998; the only previous professional American soccer team to win a league championship in their inaugural season was the Philadelphia Atoms in the 1973 NASL season.

MLS Cup appearances by team
Team (Note: Teams are listed by their official name at the time of their most recent final.)	Total appearances	Wins	Most recent win	Runners-up	Most recent loss
LA Galaxy	10	6	2024	4	2009
D.C. United	5	4	2004	1	1998
New England Revolution	5	0	—	5	2014
Columbus Crew	4	3	2023	1	2015
Houston Dynamo FC	4	2	2007	2	2012
Seattle Sounders FC	4	2	2019	2	2020
Sporting Kansas City	3	2	2013	1	2004
Chicago Fire FC	3	1	1998	2	2003
Portland Timbers	3	1	2015	2	2021
Toronto FC	3	1	2017	2	2019
San Jose Earthquakes	2	2	2003	0	—
Real Salt Lake	2	1	2009	1	2013
Colorado Rapids	2	1	2010	1	1997
Los Angeles FC	2	1	2022	1	2023
New York Red Bulls	2	0	—	2	2024
Atlanta United FC	1	1	2018	0	—
New York City FC	1	1	2021	0	—
Inter Miami CF	1	1	2025	0	—
FC Dallas	1	0	—	1	2010
Philadelphia Union	1	0	—	1	2022
Vancouver Whitecaps FC	1	0	—	1	2025

== Stadiums ==
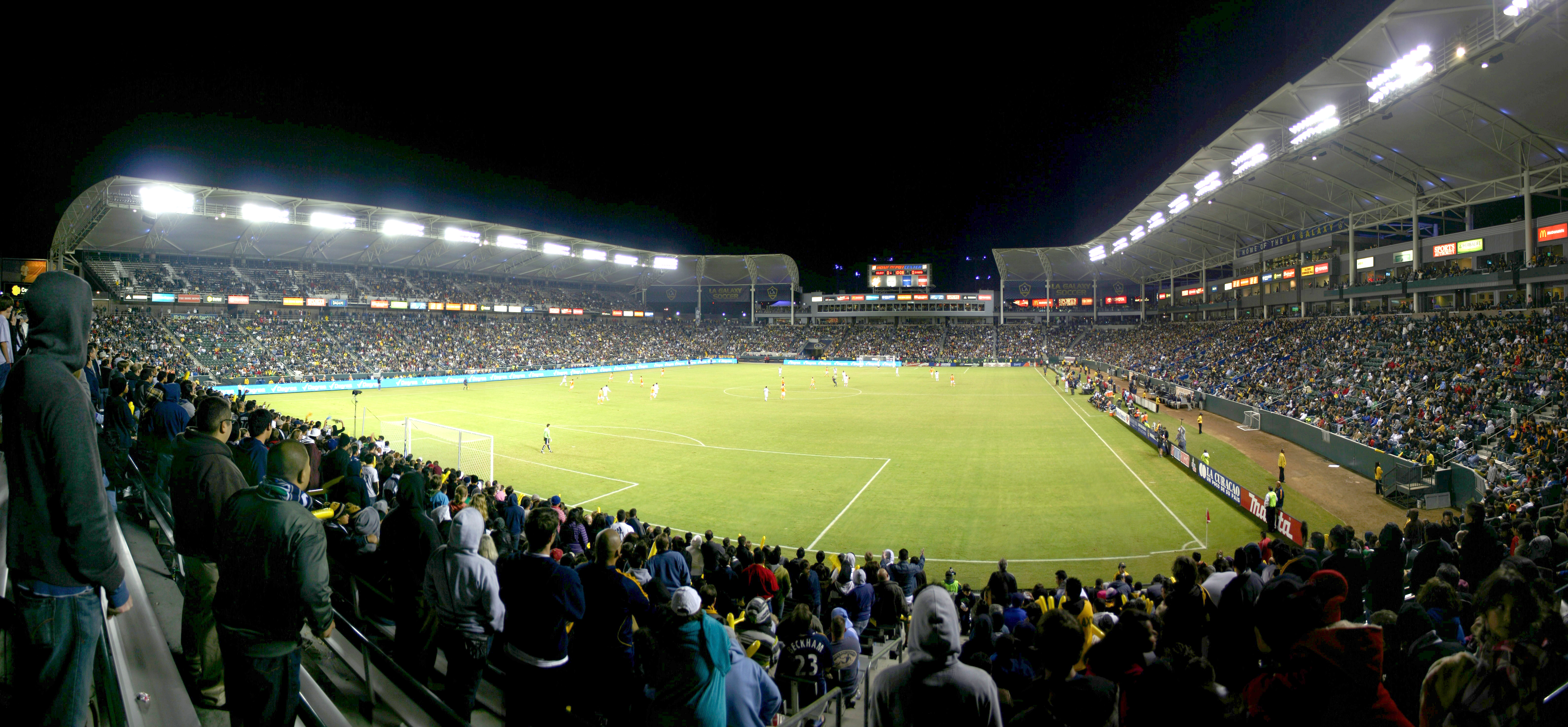
The Dignity Health Sports Park, home of the LA Galaxy, has hosted seven editions of the MLS Cup

From 1996 to 2011, the MLS Cup was hosted by a neutral site selected before the start of the season in a manner similar to the National Football League's Super Bowl championship. Three teams advanced to the final after being named as hosts: D.C. United in 1997, the New England Revolution in 2002, and the LA Galaxy in 2011. Since the 2012 edition, the match has been hosted by the finalist with the highest regular season standing. Several teams with smaller or inadequate stadiums have also considered using larger American football stadiums to host the MLS Cup, but all post-2012 editions have been played at regular MLS venues. The move towards a non-neutral venue was deemed a risk due to the cold November and December weather in some northern cities, as well as the lack of adequate stadiums for some teams.

As of 2023, the MLS Cup has been hosted in 14 stadiums across 10 metropolitan areas in the United States and Canada. Dignity Health Sports Park, previously named the Home Depot Center and StubHub Center, in Carson, California, has hosted the MLS Cup the most times of any venue, with eight editions between 2003 and 2024. The Los Angeles metropolitan area has hosted the MLS Cup nine times at three venues: the Rose Bowl, Dignity Health Sports Park, and Banc of California Stadium. The largest attendance for an MLS Cup final was the 2018 edition at Mercedes-Benz Stadium in Atlanta, Georgia, with 73,019 spectators; the smallest was in 2020 at Mapfre Stadium in Columbus, Ohio, with only 1,500 spectators allowed due to the COVID-19 pandemic. Three editions have been hosted outside the United States, all at BMO Field in Toronto, Canada. As of 2024, 11 of the 14 editions under the non-neutral venue format have been won by the host team.

MLS Cup final venues
Stadium (Note: Stadiums are listed by their official name at the time of their most recent final.)	City	Hosts	Years
Dignity Health Sports Park	Carson, California	7	2003, 2004, 2008, 2011, 2012, 2014, 2024
Robert F. Kennedy Memorial Stadium	Washington, D.C.	3	1997, 2000, 2007
BMO Field	Toronto, Ontario	3	2010, 2016, 2017
Mapfre Stadium	Columbus, Ohio	3	2001, 2015, 2020
Foxboro Stadium	Foxborough, Massachusetts	2	1996, 1999
Pizza Hut Park	Frisco, Texas	2	2005, 2006
CenturyLink Field	Seattle, Washington	2	2009, 2019
Rose Bowl	Pasadena, California	1	1998
Gillette Stadium	Foxborough, Massachusetts	1	2002
Sporting Park	Kansas City, Kansas	1	2013
Mercedes-Benz Stadium	Atlanta, Georgia	1	2018
Providence Park	Portland, Oregon	1	2021
Banc of California Stadium	Los Angeles, California	1	2022
Lower.com Field	Columbus, Ohio	1	2023
Chase Stadium	Fort Lauderdale, Florida	1	2025

== See also ==
- List of American and Canadian soccer champions
