= MLS Cup 2018 =

2018 edition of the MLS Cup

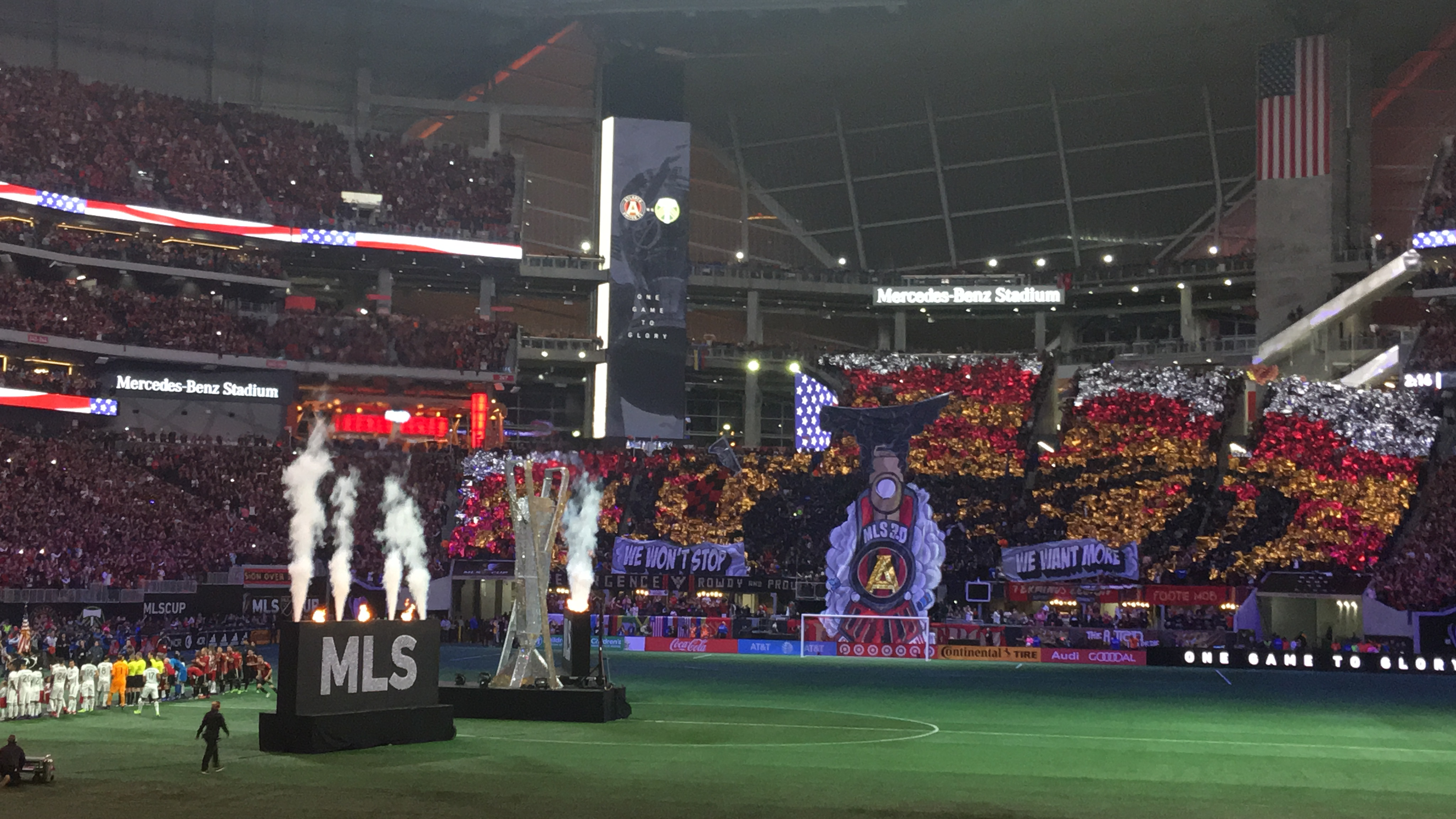
- Tifo display prior to the match
- Event: MLS Cup
Atlanta United FC	Portland Timbers
2	0
- Date: December 8, 2018
- Venue: Mercedes-Benz Stadium, Atlanta, Georgia, US
- MLS Cup MVP: Josef Martínez (Atlanta United FC)
- Referee: Alan Kelly
- Attendance: 73,019
- Weather: Rain, 41 °F (5 °C)

MLS Cup 2018 was the 23rd edition of the MLS Cup, the championship match of Major League Soccer (MLS), which took place on December 8, 2018. It was the final match of the 2018 MLS Cup playoffs and was contested by Atlanta United FC and the Portland Timbers at Mercedes-Benz Stadium in Atlanta, Georgia.

Atlanta, in their second MLS season, qualified for the playoffs as the second seed in the Eastern Conference and defeated New York City FC and Supporters' Shield winners New York Red Bulls in the playoffs. Portland qualified as the fifth seed in the Western Conference and defeated fourth-ranked FC Dallas, second-ranked Seattle Sounders FC, and first-ranked Sporting Kansas City to qualify for their second MLS Cup final.

Atlanta United won the match 2–0 for their first MLS Cup, before a crowd of 73,019. At the time, this was the largest single-match crowd in MLS history; the record was broken in 2022 when 74,479 people watched Charlotte FC's inaugural home match in 2022.

As MLS Cup winners, Atlanta United would have received an automatic berth to the 2019 CONCACAF Champions League, though they had already secured a berth through an alternate qualifying process. Atlanta hosted the 2019 Campeones Cup, which it won against Club América, the winner of the Mexican Campeón de Campeones.

== Road to the final ==
The MLS Cup is the post-season championship of Major League Soccer (MLS), a professional club soccer league in the United States and Canada. The 2018 season was the 23rd in MLS history, and was contested by 23 teams in two conferences—the east and west. Each club played 34 matches during the regular season from March to October, facing each team in the same conference at least twice and teams in the other conference at least once. The playoffs, running from late October to early December, were contested between the top six clubs in each conference and included four rounds: a one-match knockout round for the lowest-seeded teams, two rounds of home-and-away series to determine the conference champions, and the one-match final.

The finalists, Atlanta United FC and the Portland Timbers, were both expansion teams that had played in the league for less than seven seasons. The two teams played each other once in the regular season, tying 1–1 in Atlanta on June 24. The match also marked the first time that two teams coached by managers from Latin America faced each other in the MLS Cup final; both managers had never previously reached an MLS Cup final. The defending MLS Cup champions, Toronto FC, failed to qualify for the 2018 playoffs, while runners-up Seattle Sounders FC were eliminated in the conference semifinals by Portland.

=== Atlanta United FC ===
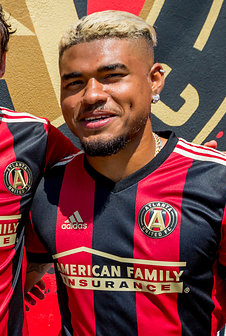
Atlanta United forward Josef Martínez set a new MLS record for goals scored in a season

Atlanta United FC entered the league as an expansion team in 2017 and appeared in their first MLS Cup final in their second season. The team became the first expansion team in eight years to qualify for the playoffs in their inaugural season, but were eliminated in the knockout round after losing to the Columbus Crew in a penalty shootout.

Atlanta started the season with a loss to the Houston Dynamo that was followed by a run of eight matches without a defeat that lasted until May. The team continued to win, particularly at home, and overtook both New York City FC and the New York Red Bulls in the Supporters' Shield rankings by the end of the summer. A loss to the Red Bulls in late September and Toronto FC on the final day of the regular season left Atlanta without a Supporters' Shield, finishing second in the Eastern Conference and second overall to the New York Red Bulls. Josef Martínez set a new league goal-scoring record, with 31 regular season goals, and was named to the MLS Best XI alongside teammate Miguel Almirón, who recorded 12 goals and 14 assists. Both players were also finalists for the league's most valuable player award, which Martínez won. Head coach Gerardo Martino was named MLS Coach of the Year and announced his plans in October to leave the club following the end of the season.

The club faced third-place New York City FC in the conference semifinals, winning 1–0 at Yankee Stadium in New York City on a goal by Eric Remedi. Atlanta defeated New York City 3–1 in the second leg with two goals by Josef Martínez, securing a berth to the conference finals with a 4–1 aggregate win. Atlanta opened the Conference Finals against the New York Red Bulls with a 3–0 victory at Mercedes-Benz Stadium before a crowd of 70,016 spectators. Despite losing 1–0 in the second leg, the club secured its first-ever MLS Cup berth and hosting rights with a 3–1 aggregate win.

Atlanta United FC was the first sports team from Atlanta to play for a league title at their home stadium since the Atlanta Braves in the 1995 World Series, which the team won to bring the city its only sports championship. Other Atlanta-area sports teams, including the Atlanta Falcons and the Georgia Bulldogs college football team, had qualified for the championship games of their respective leagues but were defeated in "heartbreaking" losses that are sometimes attributed to a curse placed after the city hosted the 1996 Olympic Games.

=== Portland Timbers ===
The Portland Timbers entered MLS as an expansion team in 2011 and won their first MLS Cup in 2015, defeating the Columbus Crew. Head coach Giovanni Savarese was hired at the beginning of the season to replace Caleb Porter; Savarese previously led the New York Cosmos to three playoff championships in the second-division North American Soccer League, including one against the Atlanta Silverbacks.

During the offseason, Portland traded away midfielder Darlington Nagbe and defender Gbenga Arokoyo to Atlanta United FC for $1.65 million in allocation money, and also declined contract options for forward Darren Mattocks and defender Ben Zemanski. Savarese used the targeted allocation money to sign several young players, including midfielder Cristhian Paredes and forward Samuel Armenteros, who were placed in the starting lineup. Portland started the season with five straight road games due to an expansion project at Providence Park, which finished in three losses and two draws. After returning to Providence Park in April, the Timbers went on a fifteen-match unbeaten streak (tying a club record) that was broken by a loss to Vancouver Whitecaps FC in August. By late September, however, Portland had only won three more matches and lost six—being outscored 15–5 in away games.

After winning 4–1 and 3–0 in successive matches against Real Salt Lake to close out the season, the Timbers qualified for the playoffs as the fifth-seed in the Western Conference, playing away to FC Dallas in the first knockout round. Despite a red card being shown to defender Larrys Mabiala, Portland won 2–1 on two goals by Diego Valeri and advanced to the semifinals to face longtime rivals and defending Western Conference champions Seattle Sounders FC. After winning the first leg 2–1 at home, the Timbers lost their aggregate lead during the second leg as the Sounders rallied to tie the series at 3–3 and force extra time. The two teams both scored a goal in extra time, tying the series 4–4 on aggregate, and the match went into a penalty shootout that Portland won 4–2 after five rounds. The match in Seattle was called one of the best playoff matches in league history due to its dramatic finish. Portland then played top-seed Sporting Kansas City in the conference finals, drawing 0–0 at home. The Timbers fell behind in the first half of the second leg, but rallied to win 3–2 on a pair of goals by Diego Valeri. The Timbers are the first fifth-seeded team to reach the MLS Cup final.

=== Summary of results ===
Note: In all results below, the score of the finalist is given first (H: home; A: away).

Atlanta United FC				Round	Portland Timbers			
2nd place in Eastern Conference: Pos / Team / Pld / Pts; 1 / New York Red Bulls / 34 / 71; 2 / Atlanta United FC / 34 / 69; 3 / New York City FC / 34 / 56; 4 / D.C. United / 34 / 51; 5 / Columbus Crew / 34 / 51; Source: MLS Qualified for playoffs				Regular season	5th place in Western Conference: Pos / Team / Pld / Pts; 3 / Los Angeles FC / 34 / 57; 4 / FC Dallas / 34 / 57; 5 / Portland Timbers / 34 / 54; 6 / Real Salt Lake / 34 / 49; 7 / LA Galaxy / 34 / 48; Source: MLS Qualified for playoffs			
Opponent	Agg.	1st leg	2nd leg	MLS Cup playoffs	Opponent	Agg.	1st leg	2nd leg
New York City FC	4–1	1–0 (A)	3–1 (H)	Conference Semifinals	Seattle Sounders FC	4–4 (4–2 p)	2–1 (H)	2–3 (A) (a.e.t.)
New York Red Bulls	3–1	3–0 (H)	0–1 (A)	Conference Finals	Sporting Kansas City	3–2	0–0 (H)	3–2 (A)

== Venue and ticketing ==
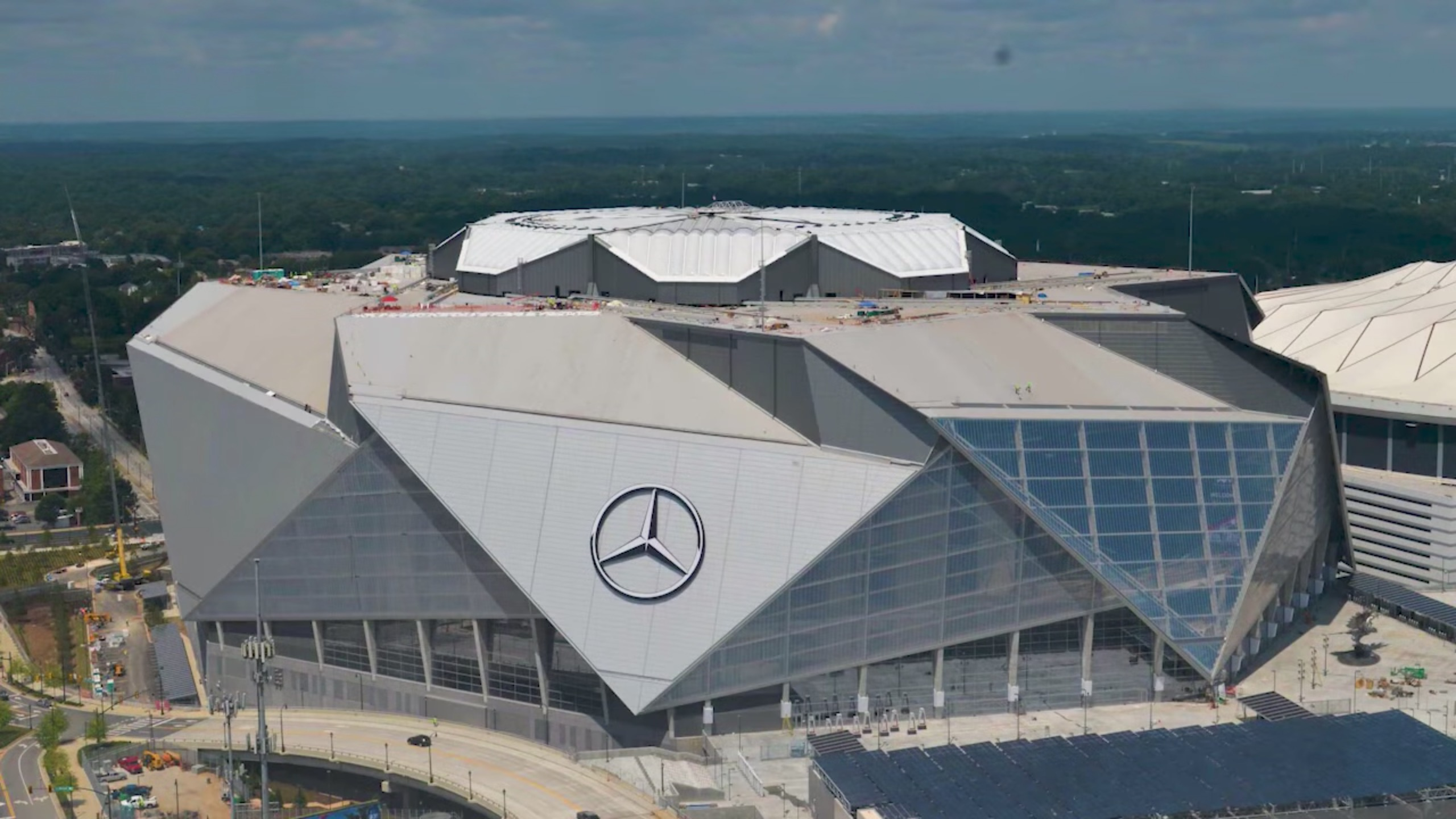
Mercedes-Benz Stadium, the host venue of MLS Cup 2018

As Atlanta United FC had the better regular season record among the two competing teams, the 2018 final was hosted at Mercedes-Benz Stadium in Atlanta. It was the eleventh stadium to host the MLS Cup final and Atlanta was the ninth metropolitan area to host the match. The $1.5 billion stadium was opened in 2017 and is used by Atlanta United FC as well as the Atlanta Falcons of the National Football League (NFL). The stadium features an artificial turf field, a cylindrical video screen, and a retractable roof.

Mercedes-Benz Stadium has a maximum capacity of 71,000, but is downsized to 42,500 for most MLS matches. Atlanta set the league's average attendance record of 53,002 in 2018, as well as the overall single-match attendance records for a regular season match (72,243 in July 2018) and a playoff match (70,526 in November 2018). It also hosted the 2018 MLS All-Star Game in August, attended by a record 72,317 spectators; Atlanta became the third city to host both an MLS Cup and an All-Star Game in the same season. The stadium hosted the 2018 SEC Championship Game, a regional college football championship, a week before the MLS Cup final on December 1, and later hosted Super Bowl LIII, the NFL's championship game, in February 2019. The eight state championship high school football games were originally scheduled to take place over the weekend, but were postponed to December 11–12 by the Georgia High School Association, who had prepared a backup date.

Ticket sales for the final began after the Eastern Conference Championship on November 29, 2018, with early access granted to season ticket members and personal seat license holders. The match was sold-out by the following morning, leaving resell tickets in excess of $300. The ticket allocation for supporters of the away team was initially limited to 900 seats, causing outcry from the supporters groups of the four semifinalist teams. The Timbers Army, Portland's largest supporters group, sold out their allocation of 1,300 tickets within four minutes. An additional 400 tickets were released in a lottery for Timbers season ticket holders, bringing the full away allotment to 1,700—an MLS Cup record. The Timbers also sent a "victory log" and mascot Timber Joey to Atlanta for the cup.

== Broadcasting ==
The MLS Cup final was broadcast in English by Fox in the United States and TSN in Canada. UniMás and Univision Deportes carried the Spanish broadcast in the United States, while TVA Sports carried the French broadcast in Canada. Fox's broadcast was led by play-by-play announcer John Strong, color analyst Stuart Holden, and sideline reporter Katie Witham. The pre-match show was anchored by Rob Stone, Alexi Lalas, and Maurice Edu, with guest appearances from U.S. national team manager Gregg Berhalter and MLS commissioner Don Garber. Fox used a total of 26 cameras for its broadcast, including a new corner flag camera, similar to end zone pylon cameras used in American football broadcasts. UniMás's broadcast was anchored by play-by-play commentators Raúl Guzmán and José Luis López Salido, alongside color analysts Diego Balado and Marcelo Balboa.

The match was also broadcast on the SiriusXM satellite radio network, with commentary from Joe Tolleson, Tony Meola, and Brian Dunseth. The MLS Cup final was broadcast on television in over 170 countries, mainly on Eurosport and Fox Sports Latin America. The Dutch Eurosport broadcast marked the last match for commentator Frank Kramer, who spent most of the MLS Cup final giving monologues and telling stories instead of commenting on the match. Eurosport later issued an apology for the broadcast and announced it would re-air the match in English.

The Fox broadcast on terrestrial television earned a 1.2 metered market rating, the highest for an MLS Cup final since 1998. The broadcast drew an average of approximately 1.56 million viewers, representing a 91 percent increase from Fox's last broadcast in 2016.

== Match ==
=== Summary ===
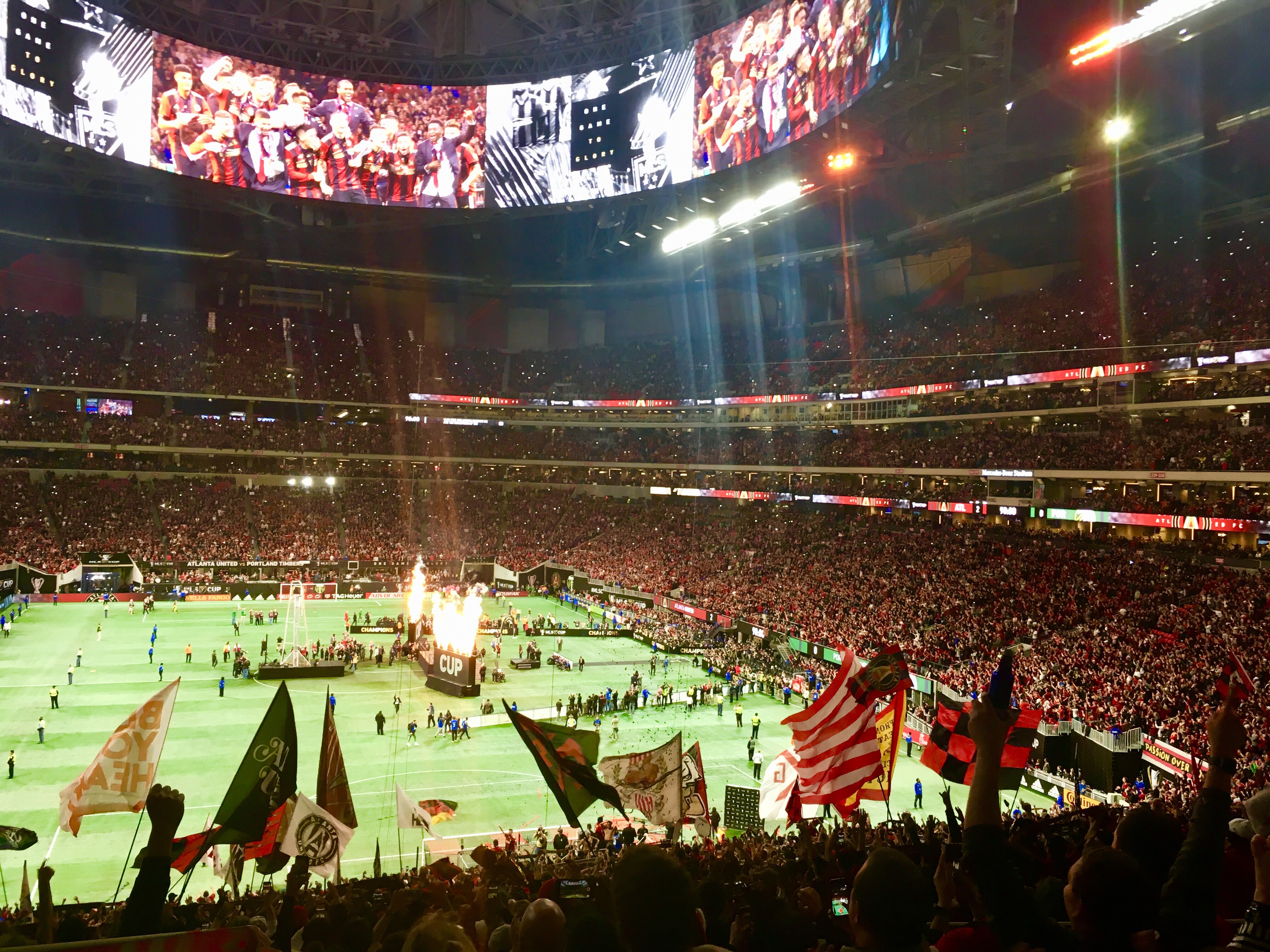
Trophy ceremony for Atlanta United FC after the final

The match began at 8:00 p.m. Eastern Time in Atlanta, with cold weather and freezing rain outside brought by a winter storm. Alan Kelly, recipient of the 2018 MLS Referee of the Year Award, was head referee of the match; it was his second MLS Cup final, having previously officiated the 2016 final in Toronto. Both teams fielded similar lineups to those used in the Conference Finals, with Atlanta using an identical 5–3–2 formation and Portland replacing defender Bill Tuiloma with Larrys Mabiala in their 4–2–3–1 formation. Atlanta midfielder and homegrown player Andrew Carleton was suspended by the club for violating a team rule. Malea Emma Tjandrawidjaja performed the national anthem prior to kickoff, reprising her role from an earlier LA Galaxy game in September. Club owner Arthur Blank was honored at the "Golden Spike" ceremony prior to the match while both sets of supporters unveiled their tifos.

Atlanta opened the first half with the majority of possession, but shared "cautious" attacking chances with Portland. In the 14th minute, Atlanta forward Josef Martínez was allegedly tripped by Timbers defender Larrys Mabiala in the penalty area, but a penalty kick was not called by referee Alan Kelly or the video assistant referee. Atlanta continued to increase its possession of the ball and pressed for further attacks, including a chance for Miguel Almirón in the 28th minute that was volleyed into the hands of Portland goalkeeper Jeff Attinella. A slide tackle in the 39th minute by defender Michael Parkhurst reached Martínez in the penalty area, who dribbled around Attinella and scored the match's opening goal. Portland responded in the 42nd minute with a cross by Sebastián Blanco to Jeremy Ebobisse, who headed the ball into the hands of Atlanta goalkeeper Brad Guzan.

Portland attempted to find an equalizing goal early in the second half with a chance for Ebobisse in the 51st minute that was saved by Guzan. Atlanta won a free kick that was taken by Almirón and headed by Martínez to right-back Franco Escobar, who scored to give the team a 2–0 lead in the 54th minute. Portland made three substitutions to bring on attacking players and saw several chances to score, including missed shots in the 73rd minute for Diego Valeri and the 82nd minute for Alvas Powell. The rest of the second half featured end-to-end plays that resulted in saves or missed shots as Atlanta looked to use up remaining time in the match. Martínez and Almirón were substituted late in the match to standing ovations from the crowd. After the final whistle, Atlanta's substitute players rushed onto the field and were presented with the Philip F. Anschutz Trophy by league commissioner Don Garber. Martínez was named the match's most valuable player for his performance, while Atlanta captain Michael Parkhurst won his first MLS Cup after four earlier attempts with the New England Revolution and Columbus Crew.

=== Details ===
December 8, 2018
8:00 p.m. EST

Atlanta United FC	2–0	Portland Timbers
Martínez 39'; Escobar 54'	Report

Mercedes-Benz Stadium, Atlanta, Georgia
Attendance: 73,019
Referee: Alan Kelly

Atlanta United FC	Portland Timbers

GK	1	(United States) Brad Guzan
CB	18	(United States) Jeff Larentowicz
CB	3	(United States) Michael Parkhurst (c)
CB	5	(Argentina) Leandro González Pírez
RWB	2	(Argentina) Franco Escobar
LWB	4	(United States) Greg Garza		(substituted off) 90+2'
CM	6	(United States) Darlington Nagbe
CM	11	(Argentina) Eric Remedi
CM	24	(Germany) Julian Gressel
CF	7	(Venezuela) Josef Martínez		(substituted off) 76'
CF	10	(Paraguay) Miguel Almirón		(substituted off) 90+1'
Substitutes:
GK	25	(United States) Alec Kann
DF	12	(United States) Miles Robinson
MF	8	(Argentina) Ezequiel Barco		(substituted on) 90+1'
MF	16	(Republic of Ireland) Chris McCann	(yellow card) 90+4'	(substituted on) 90+2'
MF	32	(Germany) Kevin Kratz
FW	15	(Paraguay) Héctor Villalba		(substituted on) 76'
FW	19	(United States) Brandon Vazquez
Manager:
(Argentina) Gerardo Martino

GK	1	(United States) Jeff Attinella
RB	16	(United States) Zarek Valentin
CB	33	(Democratic Republic of the Congo) Larrys Mabiala
CB	24	(England) Liam Ridgewell
LB	4	(United States) Jorge Villafaña
CM	21	(Colombia) Diego Chará	(yellow card) 80'
CM	20	(Costa Rica) David Guzmán		(substituted off) 82'
RW	11	(Peru) Andy Polo		(substituted off) 68'
AM	8	(Argentina) Diego Valeri (c)
LW	10	(Argentina) Sebastián Blanco
CF	17	(United States) Jeremy Ebobisse		(substituted off) 59'
Substitutes:
GK	12	(United States) Steve Clark
DF	2	(Jamaica) Alvas Powell		(substituted on) 82'
DF	25	(New Zealand) Bill Tuiloma
MF	13	(Kenya) Lawrence Olum
MF	14	(El Salvador) Andrés Flores
FW	26	(Argentina) Lucas Melano		(substituted on) 59'
FW	27	(Colombia) Dairon Asprilla		(substituted on) 68'
Manager:
(Venezuela) Giovanni Savarese

MLS Cup MVP:
Josef Martínez (Atlanta United FC)

Assistant referees:
Ian Anderson
Eric Weisbrod
Fourth official:
Nima Saghafi
Reserve assistant referee:
Kathryn Nesbitt
Video assistant referee:
Chris Penso
Assistant video assistant referee:
Thomas Supple

Match rules

- 90 minutes.
- 30 minutes of extra time if necessary.
- Penalty shootout if scores still level.
- Seven named substitutes.
- Maximum of three substitutions, with a fourth allowed in extra time.

== Post-match ==
Atlanta United FC became the 13th club to win the MLS Cup, and only the second team in the city to win a major professional sports championship. The other sports title for Atlanta at the time was won by the Atlanta Braves in the 1995 World Series. It was also the city's second soccer championship, following the North American Soccer League title won by the Atlanta Chiefs at Atlanta Stadium in 1968. Atlanta were the second-youngest franchise to win an MLS Cup, following the Chicago Fire's 1998 title in their first season. The match's announced attendance of 73,019 spectators set a new MLS Cup record, surpassing MLS Cup 2002 in New England. Super Bowl LIII, held two months later at Mercedes-Benz Stadium, drew 3,000 less attendees than the MLS Cup final due to the use of a different seating configuration. The Georgia World Congress Center Authority later reported that attendance figure for the match was 69,004, lower than the ticket distribution figure given earlier.

A one-mile-long (1.6 km) victory parade was held two days later in Downtown Atlanta, with an estimated crowd of 15,000 following the team bus from the Georgia Aquarium to Centennial Olympic Park and a rally outside Mercedes-Benz Stadium. The rally included speeches from Arthur Blank, Georgia governor Nathan Deal, and Atlanta mayor Keisha Lance Bottoms, and culminated in outgoing coach Gerardo Martino hammering in the team's ceremonial golden spike. Several players celebrated after the parade with a party at the Magic City strip club in Atlanta, where they brought the cup onstage.

As MLS Cup winners, Atlanta United FC qualified for the 2019 CONCACAF Champions League. The team had already qualified based on aggregate points for the 2017 and 2018 seasons and its original berth was transferred to the New York Red Bulls, who finished as runners-up in the aggregate table. Atlanta hosted the 2019 Campeones Cup in August against Club América, the winner of the Mexican Campeón de Campeones. They defeated Club América 3–2, becoming the first MLS team to win the Campeones Cup and the first American team to defeat a Liga MX club in a competition final since 1998. Atlanta also qualified for the 2019 MLS Cup playoffs, but were eliminated in the Eastern Conference final by Toronto FC.
