= MLS Cup 2009 =

2009 edition of the MLS Cup

- Event: MLS Cup
Real Salt Lake	LA Galaxy
1	1
- After extra time Real Salt Lake won 5–4 on penalties
- Date: November 22, 2009
- Venue: Qwest Field, Seattle, Washington, US
- MLS Cup MVP: Nick Rimando (Real Salt Lake)
- Referee: Kevin Stott
- Attendance: 46,011
- Weather: Cloudy, 45 °F (7 °C)

MLS Cup 2009 was the 14th edition of the MLS Cup, the championship match of Major League Soccer (MLS). The soccer match took place on November 22, 2009, at Qwest Field in Seattle, Washington, and was contested between the Los Angeles Galaxy and Real Salt Lake.

Real Salt Lake won the match 5–4 in a penalty shootout following a 1–1 draw. Salt Lake goalkeeper Nick Rimando was named most valuable player for making several saves in the shootout, allowing defender Robbie Russell to score the winning goal. It was the club's first championship, coming in their fifth season in the league, and the second MLS Cup to be decided by a shootout.

An attendance of 46,011 people made the 2009 final the sixth-largest in MLS Cup history. It was also the first MLS Cup to be played on artificial turf. The match was broadcast in the United States on ESPN and Galavisión.

== Venue and pre-match ==
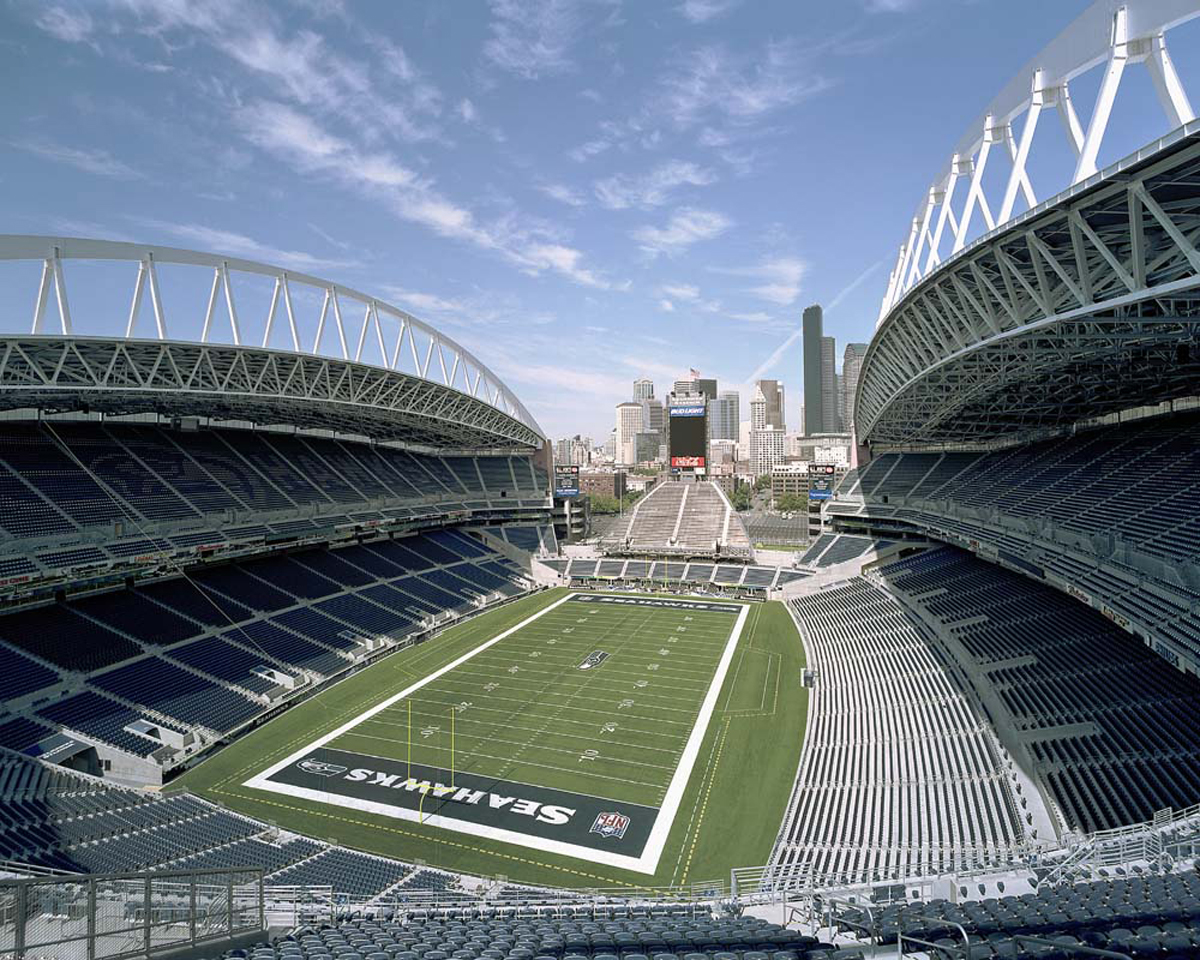
Qwest Field was chosen as host venue of MLS Cup 2009

Qwest Field was announced as the venue for the MLS Cup on March 11, 2009, a week before Seattle Sounders FC played their inaugural match at the stadium. Qwest Field became the eighth stadium to host the MLS Cup and the first new stadium chosen for the final since 2005. The selection of a venue with an artificial turf playing surface, a first for the MLS Cup, was criticized by several players prior to the final.

Qwest Field was built for the Seattle Seahawks of the National Football League in 2003, but was designed with soccer in mind. It hosted several international friendly matches, as well as part of the 2005 CONCACAF Gold Cup, prior to becoming the home stadium of the Seattle Sounders. Due to the use of Qwest Field as the MLS Cup venue, the Seattle Seahawks schedule was modified to include three away games in November. In their inaugural season, the Sounders set the league record for average attendance, with 30,897, prompting additional interest in the cup.

The initial offering of 30,000 tickets were sold out in early November, prompting the release of 6,000 additional tickets. Ticket sales passed 40,000 on the day before the match. To celebrate the MLS Cup final, the logos of the league and the two finalists were painted onto the roof of the city's iconic Space Needle. The Philip F. Anschutz Trophy was brought to the city aboard a state ferry by Sounders coach Sigi Schmid and technical director Chris Henderson. Other pre-cup festivities included a free concert by rock band Third Eye Blind, a summit of supporters representing several MLS clubs, a March to the Match from Pioneer Square, and a "Soccer Celebration" festival outside the stadium plaza.

== Road to the final ==
The MLS Cup is the post-season championship of Major League Soccer (MLS), a professional club soccer league in the United States and Canada. The 2009 season was the 14th in MLS history, and was contested by 15 teams in two conferences. Each club played 30 matches during the regular season from March to October, facing each team twice and two in-conference teams a third time. The playoffs, running from October 29 to November 22, were contested by the top two clubs in each conference and four wild card teams in the next positions regardless of conference. It was organized into three rounds: a home-and-away series in the Conference Semifinals, a single-match Conference Final, and the MLS Cup final.

The 2009 edition of the MLS Cup was contested by the Los Angeles Galaxy and Real Salt Lake. The two teams were from the Western Conference, marking the second consecutive edition to be played between two teams from the same conference. The Galaxy and Real Salt Lake played each other twice in the regular season: a 2–2 draw hosted by Real Salt Lake in May and a 2–0 loss for hosts Los Angeles in June.

=== Los Angeles Galaxy ===
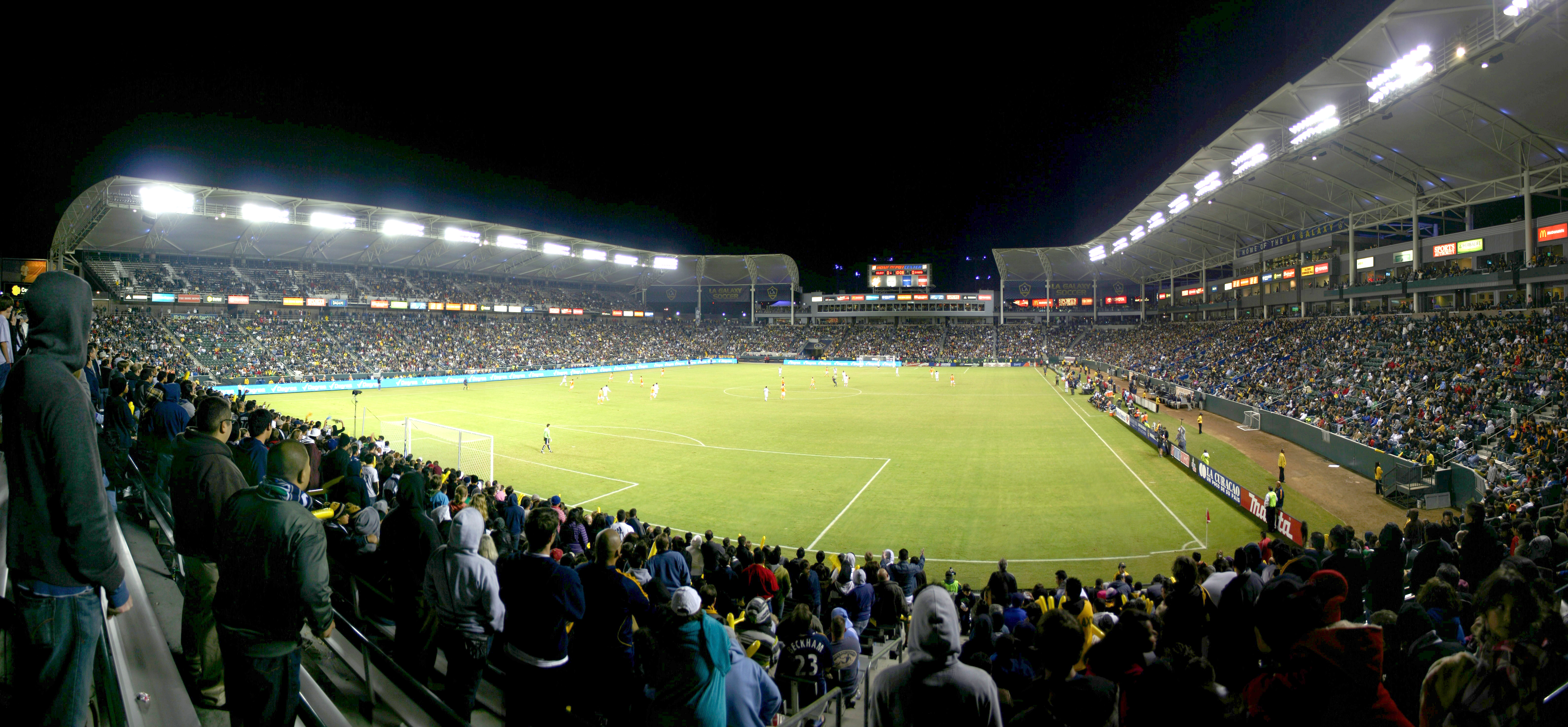
The Western Conference Final, played against the Houston Dynamo at the Home Depot Center in Carson, California

The Los Angeles Galaxy were one of the original teams in MLS and appeared in five previous MLS Cup finals, winning in 2002 and 2005. The team finished joint-last in the league in 2008, replacing manager Ruud Gullit with former United States national team coach Bruce Arena midway through the season.

In the 2009 SuperDraft, the Galaxy selected Omar Gonzalez and A. J. DeLaGarza, both of whom would lead a revamped defense alongside newly-acquired goalkeeper Donovan Ricketts. Though without star midfielder David Beckham due to an extended loan to A.C. Milan, the Galaxy began the season with one loss and two wins in their first twelve matches. After Beckham's return in July, the team went on a six-match unbeaten streak and secured a playoff berth in late August. The Galaxy finished the season with 12 wins, 6 losses, and 12 draws, placing first in the Western Conference with 48 points.

The Galaxy played the Western Conference Semifinals against Chivas USA, the co-tenant of the Home Depot Center appearing in their fourth consecutive playoffs. The first leg ended in a 2–2 draw, marked by four goals that were the result of defensive mistakes by both teams. The Galaxy advanced to the Conference Final after winning 1–0 in the second leg, with Landon Donovan scoring the lone goal from a penalty kick. The Western Conference Final was played against the Houston Dynamo and hosted by the Galaxy at the Home Depot Center. The match was interrupted by two power outages in both halves of regulation time, which ended scoreless after a Dynamo goal in the 80th minute was disallowed. Defender Gregg Berhalter scored in the 103rd minute and was followed six minutes later by a Landon Donovan penalty to give the Galaxy a 2–0 win and a place in the MLS Cup final.

=== Real Salt Lake ===
Real Salt Lake entered MLS as an expansion team in 2005, but failed to qualify for the playoffs in its first three seasons. Veteran midfielder Jason Kreis, who had scored the franchise's first goal, was appointed head coach after six straight losses to begin the 2007 season and worked with new general manager Garth Lagerwey to rebuild the team. After acquiring several key players in 2008, including captain Kyle Beckerman, and defenders Nat Borchers and Jámison Olave, the team qualified for the playoffs and advanced to the Western Conference Final, where they were defeated by the New York Red Bulls.

Salt Lake began the 2009 season, their first to be fully played at Rio Tinto Stadium and fifth overall, with nine home wins, five draws, and one loss. The team failed to produce similar results in away matches and finished with a losing record of 11 wins, 12 losses, and 7 draws. Real Salt Lake qualified for the playoffs on the last day of the season with 40 points, thanks to favorable results from three matches that eliminated five other teams competing for the final two wild card spots.

As a wild card, the team was seeded into the Eastern Conference Semifinals against the Columbus Crew, the defending MLS Cup champions. Real Salt Lake won the home leg 1–0 on a goal by Robbie Findley, but conceded two early goals in the opening 35 minutes of the away leg in Columbus. The team responded with three goals scored by Javier Morales, Findley, and Andy Williams to win 3–2 and advanced 4–2 on aggregate. Real Salt Lake faced the Chicago Fire in the Eastern Conference Final at Toyota Park in Bridgeview, Illinois, which ended in a scoreless draw after extra time. Salt Lake won the ensuing penalty shootout 5–4 after seven rounds, relying on three saves by goalkeeper Nick Rimando. Real Salt Lake became the third MLS Cup finalist to have qualified for the playoffs as the lowest seed, mirroring the New York Red Bulls the previous year, and was the second expansion team to contest an MLS Cup.

=== Summary of results ===
Note: In all results below, the score of the finalist is given first (H: home; A: away).

Real Salt Lake				Round	LA Galaxy			
5th place in Western Conference (Seeded into Eastern Conference bracket): Pos. / Team / Pld / W / L / D / Pts; 3 / Seattle Sounders FC / 30 / 12 / 7 / 11 / 47; 4 / Chivas USA / 30 / 13 / 11 / 6 / 45; 5 / Real Salt Lake / 30 / 11 / 12 / 7 / 40; 6 / Colorado Rapids / 30 / 10 / 10 / 10 / 40; 7 / FC Dallas / 30 / 11 / 13 / 6 / 39; Source: MLS Qualified for playoffs				Regular season	1st place in Western Conference: Pos. / Team / Pld / W / L / D / Pts; 1 / LA Galaxy / 30 / 12 / 6 / 12 / 48; 2 / Houston Dynamo / 30 / 13 / 8 / 9 / 48; 3 / Seattle Sounders FC / 30 / 12 / 7 / 11 / 47; 4 / Chivas USA / 30 / 13 / 11 / 6 / 45; 5 / Real Salt Lake / 30 / 11 / 12 / 7 / 40; Source: MLS Qualified for playoffs			
Opponent	Agg.	1st leg	2nd leg	MLS Cup Playoffs	Opponent	Agg.	1st leg	2nd leg
Columbus Crew	4–2	1–0 (H)	3–2 (A)	Conference Semifinals	Chivas USA	3–2	2–2 (H)	1–0 (A)
Chicago Fire	0–0 (5–4 p) (A)			Conference Final	Houston Dynamo	2–0 (a.e.t.) (H)		

== Broadcasting ==
The MLS Cup final was televised in the United States on ESPN and ESPN360.com in English and Galavisión in Spanish. GolTV Canada broadcast the match in Canada, and ESPN International carried the match in 122 countries, primarily in Latin America, the Middle East, and Oceania. This was the first edition of the MLS Cup to be carried on a cable network, as the previous thirteen were on ABC, and was scheduled later at night to compete with NBC Sunday Night Football. ESPN covered the match using 19 cameras and several digital features, including player tracking statistics and an offside line displayed on instant replays. JP Dellacamera was the lead play-by-play commentator and John Harkes provided color commentary. The network's coverage of the final was later criticized by Salt Lake City-area media outlets for its favoritism of the Galaxy.

== Match ==
=== Summary ===
External videos
- Match highlights on the Major League Soccer's official YouTube channel

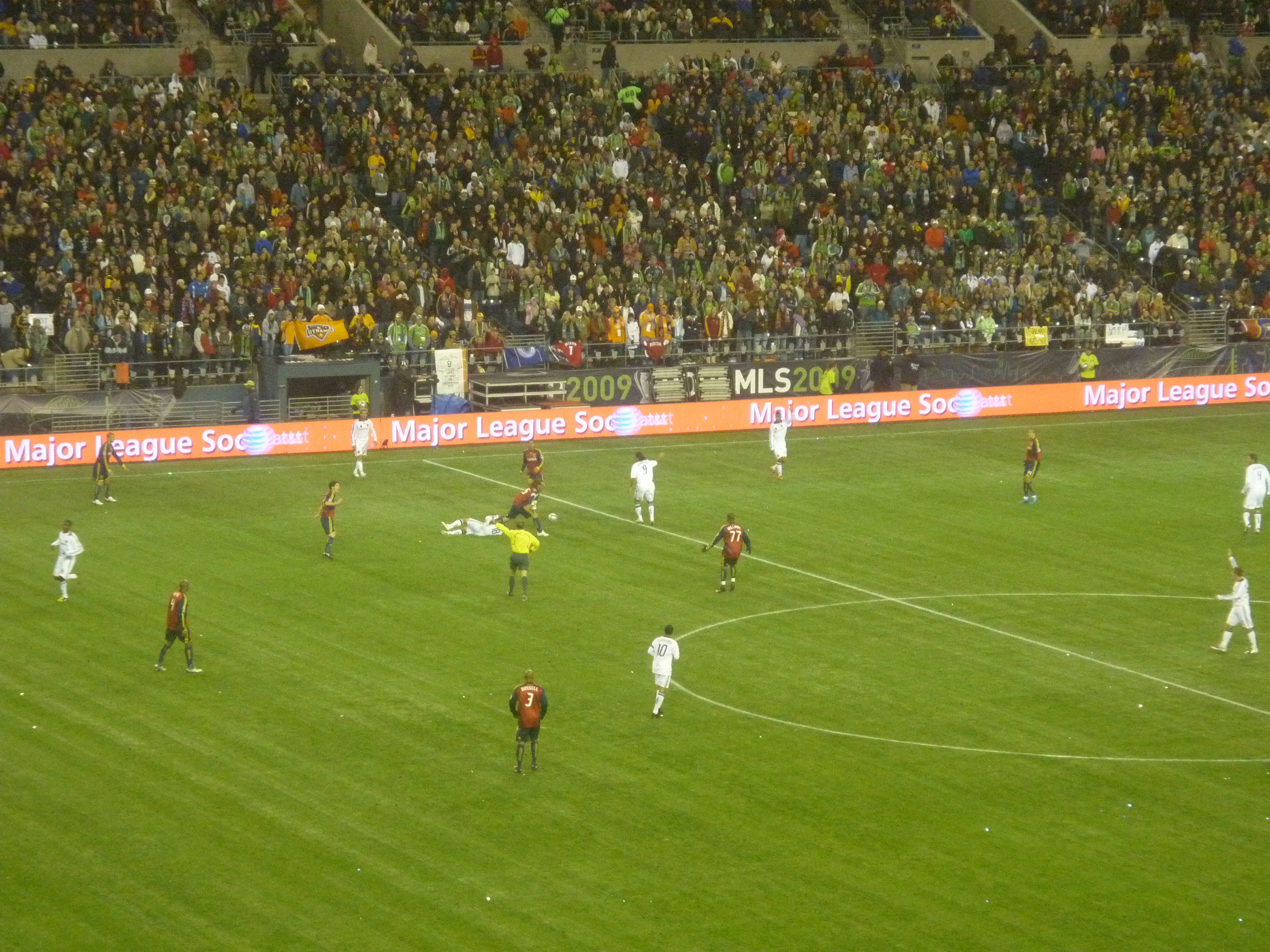
A view of the match from the stands

The Galaxy were described as the favorites in the MLS Cup match-up, with a better set of players and manager Bruce Arena's previous cup victories with D.C. United. Both teams fielded their regular lineups, with no major injuries; David Beckham was forced to skip several practice sessions prior to being injected with a painkiller to alleviate a bruised right ankle. Kevin Stott was named the head referee for his third MLS Cup final, following the 2001 and 2005 finals.

Despite a forecast of rain, the weather at kickoff was cloudy and the air temperature was 45 °F (7 °C). During the first half, the Galaxy had the majority of possession and chances on goal, taking six shots. Real Salt Lake midfielder Javier Morales was substituted in the 22nd minute after suffering from a torn meniscus in his left knee after a collision with David Beckham; Morales left the field in tears and was replaced by Clint Mathis. After two missed opportunities, Los Angeles forward Mike Magee scored the final's opening goal in the 41st minute, finishing a cross from Landon Donovan. At halftime, the Galaxy led 1–0 and Real Salt Lake were forced to substitute midfielder Will Johnson, who was suffering from food poisoning contracted days earlier.

Real Salt Lake regrouped in the second half and set up a chance in the 47th minute for Robbie Findley, who collided with Omar Gonzalez and Galaxy goalkeeper Donovan Ricketts. After being clipped by Gonzalez's right foot, Ricketts broke his right hand but elected to continue playing after being evaluated by on-field trainers. Salt Lake continued attacking and Findley scored the equalizing goal in the 64th minute by finishing a deflected shot from Yura Movsisyan. Ricketts walked off the field and was substituted in the 66th minute for his backup Josh Saunders in what was the first goalkeeper substitution in MLS Cup history. Both teams exchanged several chances late in the second half, including misses from Movsisyan and Donovan, but neither could score a second goal. The half ended with seven minutes of stoppage time due to Ricketts' treatment.

In extra time, Real Salt Lake continued to have the majority of possession and chances, eventually tallying nineteen shots to the Galaxy's thirteen. Shots by Findley and Mathis were blocked and sent wide of the goal, grazing the outside of the side net. The match remained tied after extra time, leaving the MLS Cup to be decided through a penalty shootout for the second time in its history.

The shootout began with David Beckham, who scored on his attempt, and was followed by successful penalties taken by Clint Mathis for Salt Lake, Gregg Berhalter for the Galaxy, and Findley for Salt Lake. With the score tied 2–2, Salt Lake goalkeeper Nick Rimando saved an attempt by Jovan Kirovski, and Saunders saved a kick by Salt Lake captain Kyle Beckerman. Despite his proficiency in penalties, Landon Donovan missed by putting it over the goalpost, and Ned Grabavoy scored to give Salt Lake a 3–2 lead going into the final rounds. Magee scored to keep the Galaxy in the shootout and an attempt by Salt Lake midfielder Andy Williams was saved by Saunders to trigger sudden death rounds. Williams was chosen as the final kick taker for Salt Lake by manager Jason Kreis because of the emotional connection to the team and Seattle that he had due to his wife's then-ongoing battle with a rare form of leukemia, which was being treated in Seattle. Chris Klein and Chris Wingert both scored their respective penalties, bringing the score to 4–4 before Rimando saved an attempt by Galaxy forward Edson Buddle. Salt Lake defender Robbie Russell scored the winning penalty in the seventh round, bringing the score to 5–4. After scoring the penalty, he turned around and fell to his knees as he was swarmed by his teammates.

=== Details ===
November 22, 2009
5:30 pm PST

Real Salt Lake	1–1 (a.e.t.)	LA Galaxy
Findley 64'	Report	Magee 41'
Penalties
Mathis (penalty scored); Findley (penalty scored); Beckerman (penalty missed); Grabavoy (penalty scored); Williams (penalty missed); Wingert (penalty scored); Russell (penalty scored)	5–4	(penalty scored) Beckham; (penalty scored) Berhalter; (penalty missed) Kirovski; (penalty missed) Donovan; (penalty scored) Magee; (penalty scored) Klein; (penalty missed) Buddle

Qwest Field, Seattle, Washington
Attendance: 46,011
Referee: Kevin Stott

Real Salt Lake	LA Galaxy

Real Salt Lake
GK	18	(United States) Nick Rimando
DF	4	(Colombia) Jámison Olave
DF	6	(United States) Nat Borchers
DF	3	(United States) Robbie Russell
DF	17	(United States) Chris Wingert
MF	11	(Argentina) Javier Morales		(substituted off) 22'
MF	5	(United States) Kyle Beckerman (c)
MF	77	(Jamaica) Andy Williams
MF	8	(Canada) Will Johnson	(yellow card) 14'	(substituted off) 46'
FW	9	(Armenia) Yura Movsisyan		(substituted off) 75'
FW	10	(United States) Robbie Findley
Substitutes:
GK	1	(United States) Chris Seitz
DF	2	(United States) Tony Beltran
MF	12	(Haiti) Jean Alexandre
MF	20	(United States) Ned Grabavoy		(substituted on) 46'
MF	84	(United States) Clint Mathis		(substituted on) 22'
FW	16	(Argentina) Fabián Espíndola		(substituted on) 75'
FW	19	(Brazil) Pablo Campos
Manager:
(United States) Jason Kreis

LA Galaxy
GK	1	(Jamaica) Donovan Ricketts		(substituted off) 66'
LB	2	(United States) Todd Dunivant
CB	16	(United States) Gregg Berhalter
CB	4	(United States) Omar Gonzalez		(substituted off) 89'
RB	28	(United States) Sean Franklin
RM	10	(United States) Landon Donovan (c)
CM	23	(England) David Beckham
CM	33	(Trinidad and Tobago) Chris Birchall	(yellow card) 39'	(substituted off) 79'
LM	18	(United States) Mike Magee
FW	14	(United States) Edson Buddle
FW	9	(United States) Jovan Kirovski
Substitutes:
GK	12	(United States) Josh Saunders		(substituted on) 66'
DF	5	(Trinidad and Tobago) Yohance Marshall
DF	20	(United States) A. J. DeLaGarza		(substituted on) 89'
MF	6	(United States) Eddie Lewis
MF	7	(United States) Chris Klein		(substituted on) 79'
MF	8	(Ukraine) Dema Kovalenko
FW	21	(United States) Alan Gordon
Manager:
(United States) Bruce Arena

MLS Cup Most Valuable Player:
(United States) Nick Rimando (Real Salt Lake)

Assistant referees:
C.J. Morgante
Rob Fereday
Fourth official:
Baldomero Toledo

== Post-match ==
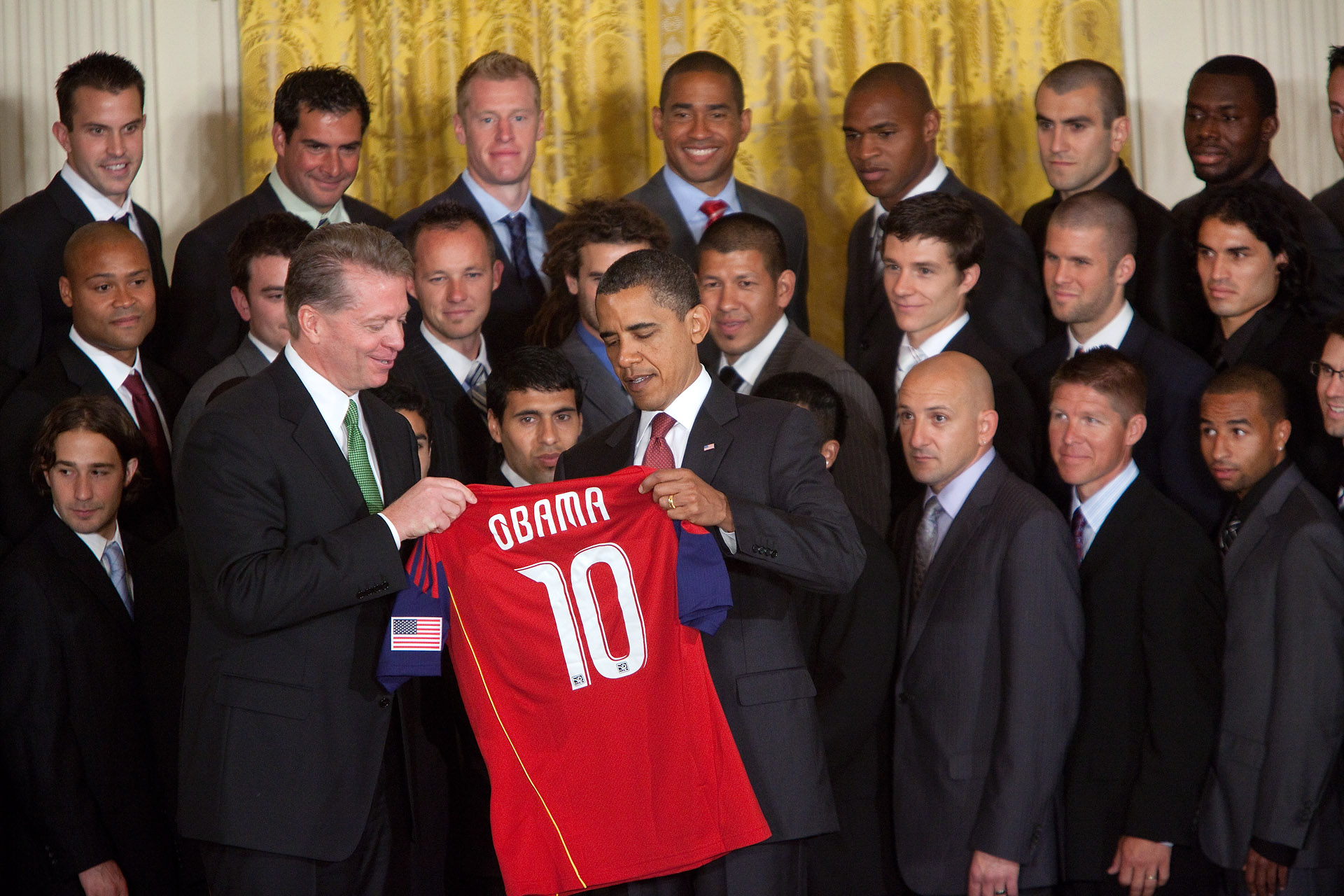
Real Salt Lake are hosted by President Barack Obama at the White House, June 2010

Real Salt Lake's upset victory gave Utah its first major professional sports championship since the Utah Stars won the American Basketball Association championship in 1971. The 2009 final was the second in MLS Cup history to be won by an expansion team and the second to finish with a penalty shootout. Nick Rimando was named the MLS Cup Most Valuable Player, only the second goalkeeper to earn the honor, and Jason Kreis became the youngest coach to win the MLS Cup, along with the fourth former player to coach a championship team.

The 2009 final was attended by 46,011 spectators, then the fourth-largest crowd for an MLS Cup final and the largest since the 2002 final at Gillette Stadium in Foxborough, Massachusetts. Approximately 2,000 fans attended from Salt Lake City and were joined by Seattle Sounders FC supporters, who chose to root for the "underdog" team. The crowd and atmosphere at the stadium were praised by league officials (including executive Don Garber), the teams, and the media. The stadium, later renamed CenturyLink Field, hosted its second MLS Cup final in 2019, which saw the Sounders defeat Toronto FC in front of 69,274 spectators—a stadium record for a sporting event.

The Real Salt Lake team returned the following afternoon and was greeted by hundreds of fans at Salt Lake City International Airport. The team was honored by a reception at the Utah Governor's Mansion and the Utah State Capitol, culminating in a parade from the state capitol to a rally at Rio Tinto Stadium attended by 5,000 fans. Governor Gary R. Herbert declared November 24, 2009, as Real Salt Lake Day. The team was later honored with a traditional champion's ceremony at the White House by President Barack Obama on June 4, 2010.

Real Salt Lake qualified for the 2010–11 CONCACAF Champions League, where they became the first MLS team to reach the modern tournament's finals, losing 3–2 on aggregate to C.F. Monterrey. Real Salt Lake would later return to the MLS Cup final in 2013, finishing as runners-up to Sporting Kansas City after losing a penalty shootout. The Galaxy and Real Salt Lake met in the 2011 Western Conference Final, where Los Angeles won 3–1 and advanced to the MLS Cup final and win their first championship since 2005. Los Angeles would also win the cup in 2012 and 2014, bringing their total number of MLS Cup championships to five and surpassing the record set by D.C. United.
