= Robbie Russell (footballer) =

Ghanaian former footballer (born 1979)

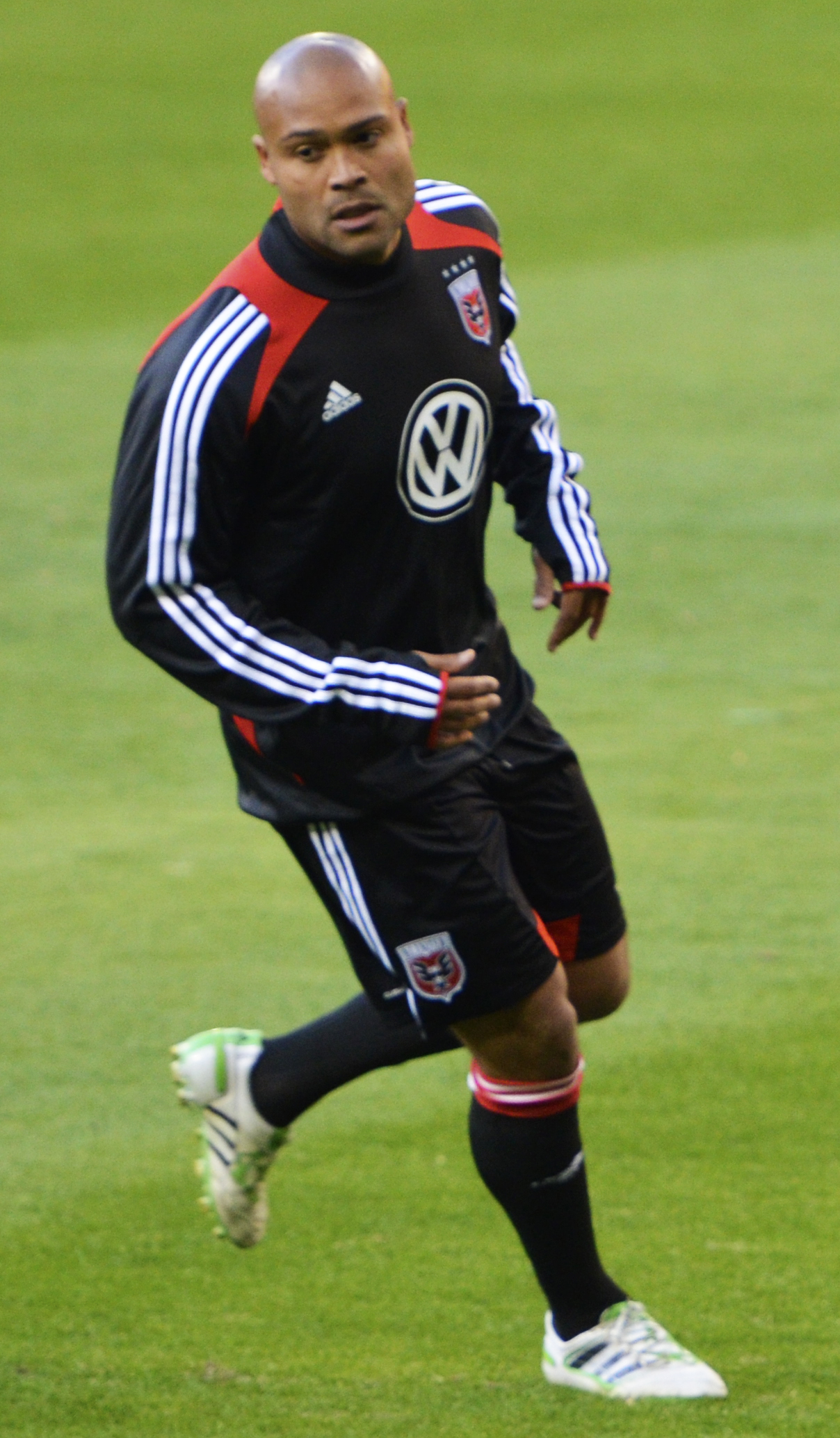

Personal information
- Full name: Robert Isaac Oleen Russell
- Date of birth: 16 July 1979 (age 47)
- Place of birth: Accra, Ghana
- Height: 6 ft 2 in (1.88 m)
- Position: Defender

College career
Years	Team	Apps	(Gls)
1997–2000	Duke Blue Devils		

Senior career*
Years	Team	Apps	(Gls)
2000–2001	Breiðablik	12	(1)
2002–2004	Sogndal	67	(4)
2004–2005	Rosenborg	13	(0)
2006–2008	Viborg	25	(0)
2008–2011	Real Salt Lake	78	(1)
2012–2013	D.C. United	20	(1)
Total		264	(11)
- * Club domestic league appearances and goals as of 1 November 2012

Robert Isaac Oleen Russell (born 16 July 1979) is a Ghanaian former footballer.

== Playing career ==
=== College ===
Russell was born in Accra, Ghana, to an American father and Ghanaian mother and spent his childhood between Ghana and the United States. He went to high school in Amherst, Massachusetts, and played college soccer at Duke University from 1997 to 2000 and decided he would play internationally in Iceland.

=== Professional ===
Russell turned professional in 2001 and spent one season at Icelandic club Breiðablik. He was drafted by the Los Angeles Galaxy of Major League Soccer but opted to try his fortunes overseas.

Russell joined Sogndal of the Norwegian Premier League, where he established himself as one of the best right backs in Norway. This fact was confirmed when Rosenborg BK also from Norway made a move for him in 2004. Russell became a starter at right back in his first season with Rosenborg BK (including two starts for the team in the UEFA Champions League) and helped the team win its 19th league title. Unfortunately he only played in a couple of matches in 2005 due to a knee injury and a change in the coaching staff. In July 2006, Russell moved to Viborg FF of the Danish Superliga. His debut for Viborg FF came in a 3–1 loss at Aalborg BK.

In July 2008, Russell ended his Scandinavian sojourn by signing with Real Salt Lake, where coach Jason Kreis was a fellow alumnus of Duke University.

On 23 November 2009, Russell scored the game-winning goal of the 2009 MLS Cup in the seventh round of a penalty kick shoot out. The goal gave Real Salt Lake their first MLS championship. On 29 May 2010, he scored his first career goal for Real Salt Lake in a 4–1 victory over the Kansas City Wizards at Rio Tinto Stadium.

On 29 November 2011, Russell was traded to D.C. United for a third-round pick in the 2013 MLS SuperDraft, which became a first-round pick in the 2013 MLS Supplemental Draft when the SuperDraft was shortened. Russell announced his retirement from professional soccer on May 15, 2013. He began classes in June 2013 in Georgetown University's Post-baccalaureate Pre-Medical Certificate Program.

Interview with the VOA in 2013.

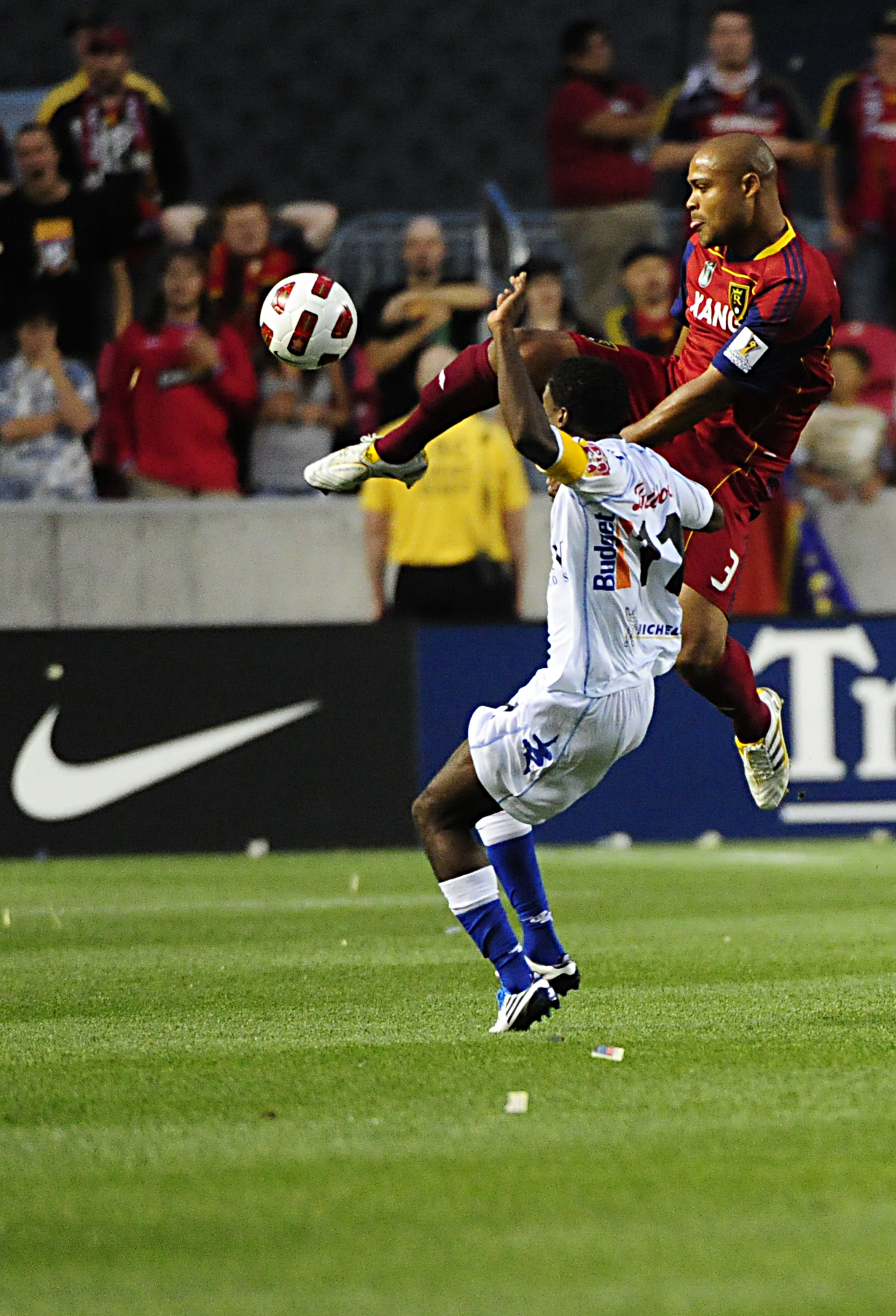
Robbie Russell (in red) scored RSL's winning penalty kick in the 2009 MLS Cup Final

== Medical career ==
Robert Russell enrolled in George Washington University School of Medicine and Health Sciences. He completed an Emergency Medicine residency at the University of Virginia in Charlottesville, Virginia. He is now an attending physician at Virginia Hospital Center in Arlington, Virginia.

== Honours ==
Real Salt Lake

- Major League Soccer MLS Cup: 2009
- Major League Soccer Eastern Conference Championship: 2009

Rosenborg

- Norwegian Premier League: Norwegian Premier League 2004
