= Philip F. Anschutz Trophy =

Major League Soccer trophy

- Sport: Soccer
- Competition: MLS Cup playoffs
- Awarded for: Winning MLS Cup
- Presented by: Major League Soccer

History
- First award: 2008
- First winner: Columbus Crew
- Most recent: Inter Miami CF

The Philip F. Anschutz Trophy is a silver trophy that is awarded to winners of MLS Cup. Since the inaugural MLS Cup in 1996, three trophies have been used: the Alan I. Rothenberg Trophy from 1996 to 1998, a second version of the Rothenberg Trophy from 1999 to 2007, and the Philip F. Anschutz Trophy since 2008. The trophy appears in the logo of the tournament, and was featured on the now-retired "scudetto" that was worn by defending champions from 2009 through 2012.

== Earlier trophies ==
The first MLS Cup trophy, introduced for the inaugural season in 1996, was named for league founder Alan Rothenberg. The trophy was phased out after three seasons, and a new trophy named after Rothenberg was introduced in 1999.

== Current trophy ==
On October 29, 2008, Major League Soccer unveiled a redesigned trophy for MLS Cup, named after Philip F. Anschutz, league co-founder and owner of multiple teams. The new trophy stands 24 inches (61 cm) tall above a 4 5/8-inch (12 cm) base, with two handles that have 11 facets each to represent the 22 players on the field during a match. The gold star represents the championship which typically becomes a permanent fixture of the winning team's crest with a star for each MLS Cup won. On the bottom side of the trophy is a map of North America with a star identifying the location of each MLS Cup-winning market. It weighs 43 pounds (20 kg) and is made of sterling silver. The original trophy is kept by the champions for the offseason before returning to Major League Soccer headquarters in New York City, while a duplicate is awarded to the club.

== See also ==
- List of MLS Cup finals
