= List of MLS Cup referees =

MLS Cup Final Referees are the referees chosen for the MLS Cup, the championship match in Major League Soccer, the top tier soccer league in the United States and Canada.

== Referees ==
| Year | Referee | Assistants | Fourth official | Reserve AR | Video Assistant Referee | Assistant VAR |
|---|---|---|---|---|---|---|
| 1996 | Esse Baharmast | Scott Olson; Paul Tamberino | Brian Hall | | —N/a | —N/a |
| 1997 | Brian Hall | Scott Olson; Greg Barkey | Paul Tamberino | | —N/a | —N/a |
| 1998 | Kevin Terry | Chip Reed; Laszio Negy | Paul Tamberino | | —N/a | —N/a |
| 1999 | Tim Weyland | Nathan Clement; Craig Lowry | Brian Hall | | —N/a | —N/a |
| 2000 | Paul Tamberino | Craig Lowry; George Vergara | Kevin Stott | | —N/a | —N/a |
| 2001 | Kevin Stott | Roger Itaya [Jon Wilson] | Paul Tamberino | | —N/a | —N/a |
| 2002 | Kevin Terry | Greg Barkey; Richard Eddy | Michael Kennedy | | —N/a | —N/a |
| 2003 | Brian Hall | Rob Fereday; Craig Lowry | Noel Kenny | | —N/a | —N/a |
| 2004 | Michael Kennedy | Nathan Clement; Kermit Quisenberry | Abiodun Okulaja | | —N/a | —N/a |
| 2005 | Kevin Stott | Chris Strickland; Greg Barkey | Ricardo Valenzuela | | —N/a | —N/a |
| 2006 | Jair Marrufo | Nate Clement; Craig Lowry | Kevin Stott | | —N/a | —N/a |
| 2007 | Alex Prus | Rob Fereday; Adam Wienckowski | Brian Hall | | —N/a | —N/a |
| 2008 | Baldomero Toledo | Kermit Quisenberry; Greg Barkey | Mark Geiger | | —N/a | —N/a |
| 2009 | Kevin Stott | C. J. Morgante; Rob Fereday | Baldomero Toledo | | —N/a | —N/a |
| 2010 | Baldomero Toledo | C. J. Morgante; Craig Lowry | Silviu Petrescu | | —N/a | —N/a |
| 2011 | Ricardo Salazar | Craig Lowry; Peter Manikowski | Hilario Grajeda | | —N/a | —N/a |
| 2012 | Silviu Petrescu | Daniel Belleau; Darren Clark | Hilario Grajeda | | —N/a | —N/a |
| 2013 | Hilario Grajeda | Paul Scott; Bill Dittmar | Ismail Elfath | | —N/a | —N/a |
| 2014 | Mark Geiger | Peter Manikowski; Joe Fletcher | Armando Villarreal | | —N/a | —N/a |
| 2015 | Jair Marrufo | Peter Manikowski; Corey Parker | Chris Penso | James Conlee | —N/a | —N/a |
| 2016 | Alan Kelly | Frank Anderson; Joe Fletcher | Allen Chapman | Danny Thornberry | —N/a | —N/a |
| 2017 | Allen Chapman | Adam Wienckowski; Jeremy Hanson | Kevin Stott | Jason White | David Gantar | —N/a |
| 2018 | Alan Kelly | Ian Anderson; Eric Weisbrod | Nima Saghafi | Kathryn Nesbitt | Chris Penso | Thomas Supple |
| 2019 | Allen Chapman | Brian Dunn; Corey Rockwell | Rubiel Vazquez | Brian Poeschel | Edvin Jurisevic | Cameron Blanchard |
| 2020 | Jair Marrufo | Corey Parker; Kathryn Nesbitt | Alex Chilowicz | Cory Richardson | Drew Fischer | Fabio Tovar |
| 2021 | Armando Villarreal | Frank Anderson Oscar Mitchell-Carvalho | Fotis Bazakos | Jeremy Hanson | Chris Penso | Cory Richardson |
| 2022 | Ismail Elfath | Corey Rockwell Ian Anderson | Joe Dickerson | Jeffrey Greeson | Drew Fischer | Jeff Muschik |
| 2023 | Armando Villarreal | Cameron Blanchard Ian McKay | Jon Freemon | Jeremy Kieso | Kevin Stott | TJ Zablocki |
| 2024 | Guido Gonzales | Kyle Atkins Logan Brown | Ismir Pekmic | Jose Da Silva | Younes Marrakchi | TJ Zablocki |
| 2025 | Drew Fischer | Cory Richardson Nick Uranga | Pierre-Luc Lauziere | Jeremy Kieso | Carol Anne Chenard | Tom Supple |
