= 2025 MLS Cup playoffs =

2025 edition of the MLS playoffs

Tournament details
- Country: United States; Canada
- Dates: October 22 – December 6
- Teams: 18

Final positions
- Champions: Inter Miami CF (1st title)
- Runners-up: Vancouver Whitecaps FC
- Semifinalists: New York City FC; San Diego FC

Tournament statistics
- Matches played: 30
- Goals scored: 99 (3.3 per match)
- Attendance: 732,920 (24,431 per match)
- Top goal scorer(s): Tadeo Allende (Inter Miami CF); 9 goals

The 2025 MLS Cup playoffs (branded as the Audi 2025 MLS Cup Playoffs for sponsorship reasons) was the post-season championship of Major League Soccer (MLS), the top soccer league in the United States and Canada. It was the 30th edition of the MLS Cup playoffs, following the conclusion of the 2025 season. The playoffs began on October 22 and concluded with MLS Cup 2025 on December 6.

Both of the previous year's MLS Cup finalists, champions LA Galaxy and runners-up New York Red Bulls, failed to qualify, the latter for the first time since 2009. San Diego FC qualified for the playoffs as Western Conference regular season champions in their inaugural MLS season, but were eliminated in the conference finals by Vancouver Whitecaps FC. The Philadelphia Union entered as Supporters' Shield and Eastern Conference regular season champions, but were eliminated in the conference semifinals by New York City FC.

Inter Miami CF won their first MLS Cup title after defeating Vancouver Whitecaps FC 3–1. Inter Miami scored 20 goals across the playoffs, breaking the LA Galaxy's record from the previous year for the most by a team in an MLS playoff campaign. Miami forward Tadeo Allende's tally of nine goals was also the most in an MLS playoff campaign by an individual, surpassing the eight scored by Carlos Ruiz in 2002.

== Format ==
Since the 2023 edition, the MLS Cup playoffs had been contested by a field of 18 teams—the top nine teams from each conference. The top seven teams in each conference automatically qualified for round one, while the eighth and ninth-placed teams in each conference played a single wild card match to determine who drew the best-ranked team in their conference, with only a penalty shoot-out occurring if the game was tied.

The first round comprised a best-of-three format, with higher seeds playing against lower seeds. The round did not use an aggregate score, and tied matches proceeded directly to a penalty shoot-out to determine the winner. The remaining three rounds—the conference semifinals, conference finals, and MLS Cup—were single-elimination matches played with extra time and a penalty shoot-out if still tied.

The team with the better regular season record hosted in all rounds except the best-of-three series in round one, where the team with the lower regular season record hosted the second of three possible matches. All matches were broadcast globally on MLS Season Pass, a streaming service operated by Apple. Select matches were available on Fox Sports channels in the US.

== Qualified teams ==
The playoffs was contested by 18 teams. The date listed indicates when each team qualified for the playoffs.

Eastern Conference

- Charlotte FC (September 13)
- Chicago Fire FC (September 30)
- FC Cincinnati (September 13)
- Columbus Crew (September 27)
- Inter Miami CF (September 24)
- Nashville SC (September 27)
- New York City FC (September 20)
- Orlando City SC (September 27)
- Philadelphia Union (August 30)

Western Conference

- Austin FC (October 5)
- FC Dallas (October 18)
- Los Angeles FC (September 20)
- Minnesota United FC (August 30)
- Portland Timbers (October 5)
- Real Salt Lake (October 18)
- San Diego FC (August 23)
- Seattle Sounders FC (September 27)
- Vancouver Whitecaps FC (September 13)

== Conference standings ==
Eastern Conference

MLS Eastern Conference table (2025)
Pos	Team	Pld	Pts
1	Philadelphia Union	34	66
2	FC Cincinnati	34	65
3	Inter Miami CF (C)	34	65
4	Charlotte FC	34	59
5	New York City FC	34	56
6	Nashville SC	34	54
7	Columbus Crew	34	54
8	Chicago Fire FC	34	53
9	Orlando City SC	34	53

Source: MLS
(C) MLS Cup champions

Western Conference

MLS Western Conference table (2025)
Pos	Team	Pld	Pts
1	San Diego FC	34	63
2	Vancouver Whitecaps FC	34	63
3	Los Angeles FC	34	60
4	Minnesota United FC	34	58
5	Seattle Sounders FC	34	55
6	Austin FC	34	47
7	FC Dallas	34	44
8	Portland Timbers	34	44
9	Real Salt Lake	34	41

Source: MLS

== Bracket ==
The higher seeded teams hosted single-elimination matches, with the MLS Cup host determined by overall points in the Supporters' Shield table. During the best-of-three round, the team with higher seed hosted the first match (and the third match, if required).

Wild card single match
E8	Chicago Fire FC	3
E9	Orlando City SC	1
W8	Portland Timbers	3
W9	Real Salt Lake	1

Round one best-of-three series
E1	Philadelphia Union	2 (4)	3	–
E8	Chicago Fire FC	2 (2)	0	–
E4	Charlotte FC	0	0 (7)	1
E5	New York City FC	1	0 (6)	3
E3	Inter Miami CF	3	1	4
E6	Nashville SC	1	2	0
E2	FC Cincinnati	1	0	2
E7	Columbus Crew	0	4	1
W1	San Diego FC	2	2 (2)	4
W8	Portland Timbers	1	2 (3)	0
W4	Minnesota United FC	0 (3)	2	3 (7)
W5	Seattle Sounders FC	0 (2)	4	3 (6)
W3	Los Angeles FC	2	4	–
W6	Austin FC	1	1	–
W2	Vancouver Whitecaps FC	3	1 (4)	–
W7	FC Dallas	0	1 (2)	–

Conference semifinals single match
E1	Philadelphia Union	0
E5	New York City FC	1
Eastern Conference
E3	Inter Miami CF	4
E2	FC Cincinnati	0
W1	San Diego FC	1
W4	Minnesota United FC	0
Western Conference
W3	Los Angeles FC	2 (3)
W2	Vancouver Whitecaps FC (p)	2 (4)

Conference finals single match
E5	New York City FC	1
E3	Inter Miami CF	5
W1	San Diego FC	1
W2	Vancouver Whitecaps FC	3

MLS Cup single match
E3	Inter Miami CF	3
W2	Vancouver Whitecaps FC	1

== Wild card round ==
Home team	Score	Away team
Eastern Conference
Chicago Fire FC	3–1	Orlando City SC
Western Conference
Portland Timbers	3–1	Real Salt Lake

=== Eastern Conference ===
October 22
7:30 pm CDT

Chicago Fire FC	3–1	Orlando City SC
Gutiérrez 48'; Cuypers 57', 68'	Report	Spicer 89'

SeatGeek Stadium, Bridgeview, Illinois
Attendance: 13,783
Referee: Drew Fischer

=== Western Conference ===
October 22
7:30 pm PDT

Portland Timbers	3–1	Real Salt Lake
Mora 24', 35'; K. Miller 82'	Report	Glad 39'

Providence Park, Portland, Oregon
Attendance: 16,243
Referee: Guido Gonzales Jr.

== Round one ==
Team 1	Series	Team 2	Game 1	Game 2	Game 3
Eastern Conference
Philadelphia Union	2–0	Chicago Fire FC	2–2 (4–2 p)	3–0	—
FC Cincinnati	2–1	Columbus Crew	1–0	0–4	2–1
Inter Miami CF	2–1	Nashville SC	3–1	1–2	4–0
Charlotte FC	1–2	New York City FC	0–1	0–0 (7–6 p)	1–3
Western Conference
San Diego FC	2–1	Portland Timbers	2–1	2–2 (2–3 p)	4–0
Vancouver Whitecaps FC	2–0	FC Dallas	3–0	2–2 (4–2 p)	—
Los Angeles FC	2–0	Austin FC	2–1	4–1	—
Minnesota United FC	2–1	Seattle Sounders FC	0–0 (3–2 p)	2–4	3–3 (7–6 p)

=== Eastern Conference ===
October 26
5:30 pm EDT

Philadelphia Union	2–2	Chicago Fire FC
Vassilev 70'; Iloski 75'	Report	Bamba 84'; Elliott 90+3'
Penalties
Uhre (penalty missed); Westfield (penalty scored); Iloski (penalty scored); Baribo (penalty scored); Bueno (penalty scored)	4–2	(penalty missed) Elliott; (penalty scored) Gutiérrez; (penalty scored) Cuypers; (penalty missed) Waterman

Subaru Park, Chester, Pennsylvania
Attendance: 19,019
Referee: Serhiy Boyko
November 1
4:30 pm CDT

Chicago Fire FC	0–3	Philadelphia Union
	Report	Baribo 8', 16'; Damiani 35'

SeatGeek Stadium, Bridgeview, Illinois
Attendance: 17,431
Referee: Jon Freemon

Philadelphia Union won the series 2–0.

October 27
6:45 pm EDT

FC Cincinnati	1–0	Columbus Crew
Denkey 78'	Report

TQL Stadium, Cincinnati, Ohio
Attendance: 23,371
Referee: Rubiel Vazquez
November 2
6:30 pm EST

Columbus Crew	4–0	FC Cincinnati
Arfsten 33'; Chambost 41'; Herrera 65'; Russell-Rowe 69'	Report

Lower.com Field, Columbus, Ohio
Attendance: 19,506
Referee: Guido Gonzales Jr.
November 8
6:00 pm EST

FC Cincinnati	2–1	Columbus Crew
Brenner 67', 86'	Report	Russell-Rowe 63'

TQL Stadium, Cincinnati, Ohio
Attendance: 25,513
Referee: Chris Penso

FC Cincinnati won the series 2–1.

October 24
8:00 pm EDT

Inter Miami CF	3–1	Nashville SC
Messi 19', 90+6'; Allende 62'	Report	Mukhtar 90+11'

Chase Stadium, Fort Lauderdale, Florida
Attendance: 21,398
Referee: Filip Dujic
November 1
6:30 pm CDT

Nashville SC	2–1	Inter Miami CF
Surridge 9' (pen.); Bauer 45'	Report	Messi 90'

Geodis Park, Nashville, Tennessee
Attendance: 30,109
Referee: Allen Chapman
November 8
8:00 pm EST

Inter Miami CF	4–0	Nashville SC
Messi 10', 39'; Allende 73', 76'	Report

Chase Stadium, Fort Lauderdale, Florida
Attendance: 19,049
Referee: Rosendo Mendoza

Inter Miami CF won the series 2–1.

October 28
6:45 pm EDT

Charlotte FC	0–1	New York City FC
	Report	Martínez 34'

Bank of America Stadium, Charlotte, North Carolina
Attendance: 33,709
Referee: Jon Freemon
November 1
3:30 pm EDT

New York City FC	0–0	Charlotte FC
	Report
Penalties
Martínez (penalty scored); O'Neill (penalty scored); Thiago Martins (penalty scored); Fernández (penalty missed); Haak (penalty scored); Wolf (penalty scored); Raul Gustavo (penalty scored); Ojeda (penalty missed)	6–7	(penalty scored) Goodwin; (penalty missed) Westwood; (penalty scored) Toklomati; (penalty scored) Toffolo; (penalty scored) Zaha; (penalty scored) Malanda; (penalty scored) Diani; (penalty scored) Byrne

Yankee Stadium, New York City, New York
Attendance: 19,051
Referee: Rubiel Vazquez
November 7
7:00 pm EST

Charlotte FC	1–3	New York City FC
Toklomati 81'	Report	Fernández 45+2', 90+10'; Martínez 50'

Bank of America Stadium, Charlotte, North Carolina
Attendance: 34,473
Referee: Pierre-Luc Lauzière

New York City FC won the series 2–1.

=== Western Conference ===
October 26
6:30 pm PDT

San Diego FC	2–1	Portland Timbers
Valakari 23'; Dreyer 30'	Report	Velde 36'

Snapdragon Stadium, San Diego, California
Attendance: 32,502
Referee: Chris Penso
November 1
6:30 pm PDT

Portland Timbers	2–2	San Diego FC
Velde 18'; Guerra 90+8'	Report	Pellegrino 45+12'; Lozano 51'
Penalties
Mora (penalty scored); Paredes (penalty missed); Fernandez (penalty missed); Velde (penalty scored); Antony (penalty scored)	3–2	(penalty scored) Dreyer; (penalty scored) Lozano; (penalty missed) Valakari; (penalty missed) Ingvartsen; (penalty missed) Tverskov

Providence Park, Portland, Oregon
Attendance: 19,260
Referee: Drew Fischer
November 9
6:00 pm PST

San Diego FC	4–0	Portland Timbers
Dreyer 5', 79'; Pellegrino 17', 53'	Report

Snapdragon Stadium, San Diego, California
Attendance: 32,502
Referee: Joe Dickerson

San Diego FC won the series 2–1.

October 26
4:30 pm PDT

Vancouver Whitecaps FC	3–0	FC Dallas
Ríos 43'; Müller 60' (pen.); Cabrera 83'	Report

BC Place, Vancouver, British Columbia
Attendance: 32,066
Referee: Victor Rivas
November 1
8:30 pm CDT

FC Dallas	1–1	Vancouver Whitecaps FC
Musa 25'	Report	Priso 90+3'
Penalties
Musa (penalty scored); Delgado (penalty missed); Moore (penalty scored); Norris (penalty missed)	2–4	(penalty scored) Müller; (penalty scored) Berhalter; (penalty scored) Cabrera; (penalty scored) Halbouni

Toyota Stadium, Frisco, Texas
Attendance: 11,004
Referee: Tori Penso

Vancouver Whitecaps FC won the series 2–0.

October 29
7:30 pm PDT

Los Angeles FC	2–1	Austin FC
Hines-Ike 20' (o.g.); Ordaz 79'	Report	Gallagher 63'

BMO Stadium, Los Angeles, California
Attendance: 22,142
Referee: Rosendo Mendoza
November 2
7:30 pm CST

Austin FC	1–4	Los Angeles FC
Pereira 45+6' (pen.)	Report	Son Heung-min 21'; Bouanga 25', 44'; Ebobisse 90+3'

Q2 Stadium, Austin, Texas
Attendance: 20,738
Referee: Joe Dickerson

Los Angeles FC won the series 2–0.

October 27
8:00 pm CDT

Minnesota United FC	0–0	Seattle Sounders FC
	Report
Penalties
Yeboah (penalty scored); Triantis (penalty scored); Pereyra (penalty scored); Gressel (penalty missed)	3–2	(penalty scored) Rusnák; (penalty missed) Á. Roldán; (penalty scored) Ragen; (penalty missed) C. Roldan; (penalty missed) Leyva

Allianz Field, St. Paul, Minnesota
Attendance: 16,945
Referee: Alexis Da Silva
November 3
7:30 pm PST

Seattle Sounders FC	4–2	Minnesota United FC
Vargas 8', 86'; Morris 21'; Musovski 41'	Report	Triantis 45+1'; Lod 45+5'

Lumen Field, Seattle, Washington
Attendance: 30,085
Referee: Pierre-Luc Lauzière
November 8
3:00 pm CST

Minnesota United FC	3–3	Seattle Sounders FC
Pereyra 19'; Díaz 62'; Markanich 71'	Report	Rusnák 5'; Musovski 8'; Morris 88'
Penalties
Pereyra (penalty missed); Triantis (penalty scored); Gene (penalty scored); Duggan (penalty scored); Boxall (penalty scored); Harvey (penalty scored); Markanich (penalty missed); Dotson (penalty missed); Hlongwane (penalty scored); St. Clair (penalty scored)	7–6	(penalty scored) Rusnák; (penalty missed) Morris; (penalty scored) Ragen; (penalty scored) Kent; (penalty scored) Rothrock; (penalty scored) Minoungou; (penalty missed) Vargas; (penalty missed) De Rosario; (penalty scored) Á. Roldán; (penalty missed) Thomas

Allianz Field, St. Paul, Minnesota
Attendance: 18,645
Referee: Victor Rivas

Minnesota United FC won the series 2–1.

== Conference semifinals ==
The higher-seeded team as determined by regular season ranking hosted the match.

Home team	Score	Away team
Eastern Conference
Philadelphia Union	0–1	New York City FC
FC Cincinnati	0–4	Inter Miami CF
Western Conference
San Diego FC	1–0	Minnesota United FC
Vancouver Whitecaps FC	2–2 (a.e.t.) (4–3 p)	Los Angeles FC

=== Eastern Conference ===
November 23
5:00 pm EST

FC Cincinnati	0–4	Inter Miami CF
	Report	Messi 19'; Silvetti 57'; Allende 62', 74'

TQL Stadium, Cincinnati, Ohio
Attendance: 25,513
Referee: Drew Fischer

November 23
7:30 pm EST

Philadelphia Union	0–1	New York City FC
	Report	Moralez 27'

Subaru Park, Chester, Pennsylvania
Attendance: 19,210
Referee: Guido Gonzales Jr.

=== Western Conference ===
November 22
6:30 pm PST

Vancouver Whitecaps FC	2–2 (a.e.t.)	Los Angeles FC
Sabbi 39'; Laborda 45+1'	Report	Son Heung-min 60', 90+5'
Penalties
Berhalter (penalty scored); Nelson (penalty scored); Gauld (penalty scored); Ocampo (penalty missed); Laborda (penalty scored)	4–3	(penalty missed) Son Heung-min; (penalty scored) Bouanga; (penalty missed) Delgado; (penalty scored) Moran; (penalty scored) Amaya

BC Place, Vancouver, British Columbia
Attendance: 53,957
Referee: Rubiel Vazquez

November 24
7:00 pm PST

San Diego FC	1–0	Minnesota United FC
Dreyer 72'	Report

Snapdragon Stadium, San Diego, California
Attendance: 32,502
Referee: Rosendo Mendoza

== Conference finals ==
The higher-seeded team as determined by regular season ranking hosted the match.

Home team	Score	Away team
Eastern Conference
Inter Miami CF	5–1	New York City FC
Western Conference
San Diego FC	1–3	Vancouver Whitecaps FC

=== Eastern Conference ===
November 29
6:00 pm EST

Inter Miami CF	5–1	New York City FC
Allende 14', 23', 89'; Silvetti 67'; Segovia 83'	Report	Haak 37'

Chase Stadium, Fort Lauderdale, Florida
Attendance: 19,136
Referee: Jon Freemon

=== Western Conference ===
November 29
6:00 pm PST

San Diego FC	1–3	Vancouver Whitecaps FC
Lozano 60'	Report	White 8', 45+2'; Sisniega 11' (o.g.)

Snapdragon Stadium, San Diego, California
Attendance: 32,502
Referee: Joe Dickerson

== MLS Cup 2025 ==
The higher-ranked finalist in the overall Supporters' Shield table (Inter Miami CF) hosted the match.

December 6, 2025
2:30 p.m. EST

Inter Miami CF	3–1	Vancouver Whitecaps FC
Ocampo 8' (o.g.); De Paul 71'; Allende 90+6'	Report	Ahmed 60'

Chase Stadium, Fort Lauderdale, Florida
Attendance: 21,556
Referee: Drew Fischer

== Top goalscorers ==
Rank	Player	Club	Goals
1	(Argentina) Tadeo Allende	Inter Miami CF	9
2	(Argentina) Lionel Messi	Inter Miami CF	6
3	(Denmark) Anders Dreyer	San Diego FC	4
4	(Norway) Amahl Pellegrino	San Diego FC	3
4	(South Korea) Son Heung-min	Los Angeles FC	3
6	(Israel) Tai Baribo	Philadelphia Union	2
6	(Gabon) Denis Bouanga	Los Angeles FC	2
6	(Brazil) Brenner	FC Cincinnati	2
6	(Belgium) Hugo Cuypers	Chicago Fire FC	2
6	(Argentina) Nicolás Fernández	New York City FC	2
6	(Mexico) Hirving Lozano	San Diego FC	2
6	(Costa Rica) Alonso Martínez	New York City FC	2
6	(Chile) Felipe Mora	Portland Timbers	2
6	(United States) Jordan Morris	Seattle Sounders FC	2
6	(United States) Danny Musovski	Seattle Sounders FC	2
6	(Canada) Jacen Russell-Rowe	Columbus Crew	2
6	(Argentina) Mateo Silvetti	Inter Miami CF	2
6	(Mexico) Obed Vargas	Seattle Sounders FC	2
6	(Norway) Kristoffer Velde	Portland Timbers	2
6	(United States) Brian White	Vancouver Whitecaps FC	2
