= Professional Referee Organization =

North American soccer referee organization

- Founded: November 2012; 14 years ago
- Headquarters: 420 Fifth Avenue; 7th Floor; New York, NY 10018
- Area served: United States and Canada
- Key people: Nick Primavera (COO); Mark Geiger (general manager)
- Website: www.proreferees.com

Professional Referee Organization (PRO) is the organization responsible for managing the referee and assistant referee program in professional soccer leagues in the United States and Canada, working alongside the United States Soccer Federation, Major League Soccer, the Canadian Soccer Association, the United Soccer League, the National Women's Soccer League, MLS Next Pro, and the U.S. Open Cup.

The organization's targets are to increase the quality of officiating in U.S. and Canadian professional leagues, develop more professional-quality officials at a younger age, and produce officials who will represent the United States and Canada in FIFA competitions.

The PRO senior match officials primarily referee in Major League Soccer. The PRO2 officials primarily referee in the USL, NWSL, and MLS Next Pro.

== History ==
The U.S. Soccer Federation and Major League Soccer joined forces in 2012 to create the Professional Referee Organization and the aims for PRO is to develop a higher standard of officiating at a younger age and to produce referees who can represent the United States and Canada in FIFA competitions.

Then U.S. Soccer President Sunil Gulati said, "We've always understood that the development of referees is an important aspect to the growth of the game in the United States. PRO is another step toward the improvement and professionalization of our top referees. With the additional resources and funding provided by the formation of PRO, we will continue to build upon the progress we've already made."

The referees employed by PRO are represented by the PSRA. PRO and the PSRA have negotiated several collective bargaining agreements. In 2014, PRO used replacement officials for the first two weekends of the MLS season. During the 2024 MLS referee lockout, replacement officials were used for the first six matchdays.

== Staff ==
Executive Staff and Senior Match Officials Dept
Name	Position
Mark Geiger	General Manager
Nick Primavera	Chief Operating Officer
Joe Fletcher	Chief Refereeing Officer
Alan Kelly	Director of Senior Match Officials
Frank Anderson	Manager of Senior Assistant Referees
Greg Barkey	Manager of Video Review

PRO2 Match Officials Dept
Name	Position
Alex Prus	Director of PRO2 Match Officials
Erich Simmons	Director of PRO2 Referees
Ian Anderson	Director of PRO2 Assistant Referees
Dave Gantar	Manager of PRO2 Video Review
Melissa Borjas	Manager of NWSL officials
Kate Jacewicz	PRO2 Referee Coach
Mark Kadlecik	PRO2 Referee Coach
Abbey Okulaja	PRO2 Referee Coach
Robert Sibiga	PRO2 Referee Coach
Sorin Stoica	PRO2 Referee Coach
Chantel Boundreau	PRO2 Assistant Referee Coach
Steve Montanino	PRO2 Technical Coordinator
Alan Black	Director of Assessment
Chris Rivett	Director of Communication and External Relations

PRO Sports Performance
Name	Position
Tom Beckvermit	Director of Sports Performance
Lisa Stalans	Head of Sports Medicine
John Westbrooks	Head Sports Performance Coach
Heather Betancourt	Sports Performance Coach
Frank Barone	Sports Performance Coach

Administrative Staff
Name	Position
John Loder	Director of Finance and Accounting
Sarah Bettison	Manager of Human Resources and Planning
Dax Almazan	Manager of Payroll and Accounting
Mariam Blount	Human Resources Coordinator
Stephen Mcloughlin	Senior Staff Accountant
Brian Carney	Accounting Coordinator
Wynnifred Sanders	Human Resources Generalist

Operations Dept
Name	Position
Nicole Ward	Director of Operations
Drayden Farci	Manager of Operations
Amy Edwards	Manager of Tactical and Video Analysis
Leisha Alcia	Operations Coordinator
Paolo Mondini	Operations Coordinator
Cheryl Malik	Manager of Travel
Warren Rosario	Manager of Technology
Luke Berry	Tactical and Video Analyst

== Awards ==
=== Major League Soccer awards ===
- For a list of recipients before PRO's creation in 2012: MLS Referee of the Year Award
- For a list of officials who have been appointed to the MLS Cup final: List of MLS Cup Referees

Season	Referee	Assistant Referee
2012	(Canada) Silviu Petrescu	(United States) Ian Anderson
2013	(United States) Hilario Grajeda	(United States) Kermit Quisenberry
2014	(United States) Mark Geiger	(United States) Paul Scott
2015	(Republic of Ireland) Alan Kelly	(United States) Corey Parker
2016	(Republic of Ireland) Alan Kelly	(United States) Frank Anderson
2017	(United States) Allen Chapman	(United States) Corey Parker
2018	(Republic of Ireland) Alan Kelly	(Canada) Joe Fletcher
2019	(United States) Allen Chapman	(United States) Brian Dunn
2020	(United States) Ismail Elfath	(United States) Kathryn Nesbitt
2021	(Poland) / (United States) Robert Sibiga	(United States) Cory Richardson
2022	(United States) Ismail Elfath	(United States) Corey Rockwell
2023	(United States) Victor Rivas	(United States) Ian McKay
2024	(Canada) Drew Fischer	(United States) Kyle Atkins
2025	(Canada) Drew Fischer	(United States) Cory Richardson
2026	(United States) Jon Freemon	(United States) Felisha Mariscal

=== USL Championship awards ===
Season	Referee	Assistant Referee
2019	(United States) Guido Gonzales Jr.	(United States) Ian McKay
2020	(United States) Elton Garcia	(United States) Diego Blas
2021	(United States) Matt Thompson	(United States) Mike Nickerson
2022	(United States) Mark Allatin	(United States) Kali Smith
2023	(United States) Calin Radosav	(France) Christian Clerc
2024	(United States) Abdoe Ndiaye	(United States) Matthew Rodman
2025	(United States) Matthew Corrigan	(United States) Rhett Hammil

=== NWSL awards ===
Season	Referee	Assistant Referee
2025	(United States) Natalie Simon	(United States) Katarzyna Wasiak
2026	(United States) Alyssa Pennington	(United States) Sarah Gaddes

== Roster ==
Ahead of the 2026 Major League Soccer season, these match officials were listed on the PRO rosters.

=== Referees ===
- (United States) Elijio Arreguin
- (United States) Malik Badawi
- (United States) Fotis Bazakos
- (Ukraine) Serhiy Boyko
- (United States) Allen Chapman
- (Brazil) / (United States) Alexis Da Silva
- (Brazil) / (United States) Marcos DeOliveira
- (Ukraine) / (United States) Sergii Demianchuk
- (United States) Joe Dickerson
- (Canada) Filip Dujic
- (United States) Ismail Elfath
- (United States) Ricardo Fierro
- (Canada) Drew Fischer
- (United States) Tim Ford
- (United States) Jon Freemon
- (United States) Guido Gonzales, Jr
- (United States) Lorenzo Hernandez
- (Canada) Pierre-Luc Lauzière
- (United States) Jair Marrufo
- (United States) Rosendo Mendoza
- (Costa Rica) Ricardo Montero
- (United States) Ismir Pekmic
- (United States) Chris Penso
- (United States) Tori Penso
- (United States) Victor Rivas
- (United States) Nima Saghafi
- (Poland) / (United States) Lukasz Szpala
- (United States) Ramy Touchan
- (United States) Rubiel Vazquez
- (United States) Armando Villarreal

=== Assistant referees ===
- (Canada) Lyes Arfa
- (United States) Kyle Atkins
- (United States) Nick Balcer
- (Canada) Micheal Barwegen
- (United States) Andrew Bigelow
- (United States) Cameron Blanchard
- (United States) Diego Blas
- (United States) Logan Brown
- (United States) Jose da Silva
- (United States) Brian Dunn
- (United States) Chris Elliott
- (Canada) Gianni Facchini
- (United States) Adam Garner
- (United States) Ryan Graves
- (United States) Jeffrey Greeson
- (United States) Rhett Hammil
- (United States) Jeremy Hanson
- (United States) Walt Heatherly
- (United States) Justin Howard
- (United States) Eduardo Jeff
- (United States) Jeremy Kieso
- (United States) Kevin Klinger
- (Canada) Gérard-Kader Lebuis
- (United States) Kevin Lock
- (United States) Felisha Mariscal
- (United States) Brooke Mayo
- (United States) Stephen McGonagle
- (United States) Ian McKay
- (Canada) Oscar Mitchell-Carvalho
- (United States) Meghan Mullen
- (United States) Matt Nelson
- (United States) Kathryn Nesbitt
- (United States) Mike Nickerson
- (United States) Corey Parker
- (United States) Ben Pilgrim
- (United States) Brian Poeschel
- (United States) Cory Richardson
- (United States) Corey Rockwell
- (United States) Kali Smith
- (United States) Jeffrey Swartzel
- (Canada) Stefan Tanaka-Freundt
- (United States) Nick Uranga
- (Canada) Chris Wattam
- (United States) Eric Weisbrod
- (United States) Jason White
- (United States) Adam Wienckowski
- (United States) Tyler Wyrostek

=== Video assistant referees ===
- (Canada) David Barrie
- (Canada) Carol Anne Chenard
- (United States) Greg Dopka
- (Canada) Geoff Gamble
- (United States) Jorge Gonzalez
- (United States) Edvin Jurisevic
- (United States) Younes Marrakchi
- (United States) Michael Radchuk
- (United States) Daniel Radford
- (United States) José Carlos Rivero
- (United States) Kevin Stott
- (United States) Shawn Tehini
- (United States) Kevin Terry Jr.

=== Assistant video assistant referees ===
- (United States) Claudiu Badea
- (United States) Tom Felice
- (United States) Jonathan Johnson
- (United States) Mike Kampmeinert
- (United States) John Krill
- (United States) Craig Lowry
- (United States) Jeffrey Muschik
- (United States) Josh Patlak
- (Canada) Robert Schaap
- (United States) Thomas Supple
- (United States) Fabio Tovar
- (United States) TJ Zablocki

=== International roster ===
As of January 2026, these PRO senior match officials' were listed on the international roster:

See also: List of FIFA international referees

Referees
- (United States) Joe Dickerson
- (Canada) Filip Dujic
- (United States) Ismail Elfath
- (Canada) Drew Fischer
- (United States) Jon Freemon
- (United States) Guido Gonzales Jr
- (Canada) Pierre Luc Lauziere
- (United States) Rosendo Mendoza
- (United States) Tori Penso
- (United States) Victor Rivas
- (United States) Lucasz Szpala
- (United States) Rubiel Vazquez
- (United States) Armando Villarreal

Assistant Referees

- (Canada) Lyes Arfa
- (United States) Kyle Atkins
- (Canada) Michael Barwegen
- (United States) Cameron Blanchard
- (United States) Logan Brown
- (United States) Chris Elliot
- (United States) Jose Da Silva
- (United States) Ryan Graves
- (United States) Jeremy Kieso
- (United States) Felisha Mariscal
- (United States) Brooke Mayo
- (United States) Meghan Mullen
- (United States) Kathryn Nesbitt
- (United States) Corey Parker
- (United States) Corey Richardson
- (United States) Kali Smith
- (Canada) Stefan Tanaka-Freudent
- (United States) Nick Urganda
- (Canada) Chris Wattam

Video Match Officials

- (United States) Allen Chapman
- (United States) Tim Ford
- (United States) Edvin Jurisevic
- (United States) Chris Penso
- (United States) Jose Carlos Rivero

== PRO2 Roster ==
As of January 2026, these PRO officials were listed on the PRO2 roster:

=== Referees ===
- (United States) Rodrigo Albuquerque
- (United States) Lauren Aldrich
- (United States) Luis Arroyo
- (United States) Nabil Bensalah
- (United States) Servando Berna
- (United States) Alex Billeter
- (United States) Alijo Calume
- (United States) (Spain) Cristian Campo-Hernandez
- (United States) Edson Carvajal
- (United States) Danielle Chesky
- (United States) (Republic of Ireland) Matthew Corrigan
- (United States) Greg Dopka
- (United States) Marie Durr
- (United States) Joshua Encarnacion
- (United States) Gerald Flores
- (United States) Elton Garcia
- (United States) JC Griggs
- (United States) Amin Hadzic
- (United States) Muhammad Hassan
- (United States) Brad Jensen
- (United States) Muhammad Kaleia
- (United States) Drew Klemp
- (United States) Katja Koroleva
- (United States) John Matto
- (United States) Corbyn May
- (United States) Jaclyn Metz
- (United States) Ben Meyer
- (United States) Adorae Monroy
- (United States) (Ghana) Abdou Ndiaye
- (United States) Elvis Osmanovic
- (United States) Jamie Padilla
- (United States) Alyssa Pennington
- (United States) (Ukraine) Iryna Petrunok
- (United States) Calin Radosav
- (United States) Carlos Rodriguez
- (United States) Laura Rodriguez
- (United States) Jeremy Scheer
- (United States) Natalie Simon
- (United States) Thomas Snyder
- (United States) Brandon Stevis
- (United States) Joe Surgan
- (United States) Shawn Tehini
- (United States) Matt Thompson
- (United States) Mark Verso
- (United States) Robert Vincze
- (United States) Anya Viogt
- (United States) Trevor Wiseman
- (United States) (Turkey) Atahan Yaya

=== Assistant referees ===
- (United States) Alexander Arita
- (United States) Art Arustamyan
- (United States) Colin Ashley
- (United States) Darren Bandy
- (United States) Seth Barton
- (United States) Melissa Beck
- (United States) Jake Brochu
- (United States) Ethan Buege
- (United States) Jessica Carnevale
- (United States) Laura Chambers Waliski
- (United States) (South Korea) Zeno Cho
- (United States) (France) Clarence Clark
- (United States) Christian Clerc
- (United States) Adam Cook
- (United States) Eric Del Rosario
- (United States) Mateusz Dulski
- (United States) Tom Felice
- (United States) Fernando Fierro
- (United States) Justin Fillmore
- (United States) Chana Forstall
- (United States) Sarah Gaddes
- (United States) Jennifer Garner
- (United States) Sharon Gingrich
- (United States) Melissa Gonzalez
- (United States) Peter Hanson
- (United States) Austin Holt
- (United States) Kevin Huet
- (United States) Noah Kenyawani
- (United States) John Krill
- (United States) Eric Krueger
- (United States) Christian Little
- (United States) Jacob Little
- (United States) Brian Marshall
- (United States) Seth Martin
- (United States) Kendall McCarddell
- (United States) Zach McWhorter
- (United States) Alicia Messer
- (United States) Stephen Milhoan
- (United States) Ricardo Ocampo
- (United States) Kristin Patterson
- (United States) Salma Perez
- (United States) Ben Rigel
- (United States) Bruno Rizo
- (United States) Matthew Rodman
- (United States) Bennett Savage
- (United States) Chris Schurfranz
- (United States) Matthew Schwartz
- (United States) Matthew Seem
- (United States) Nicholas Seymour
- (United States) Amilcar Sicaju
- (United States) Cameron Siler
- (United States) Jeremy Smith
- (United States) Max Smith
- (United States) Rachel Smith
- (United States) Joe Suchoski
- (United States) Matt Trotter
- (United States) Tiffini Turpin
- (United States) Katarzyna Wasiak
- (United States) (Australia) Seun Yinka-Kehinde

== International appointments ==
PRO Officials at FIFA Men's World Cups
2014 World Cup Brazil	2018 World Cup Russia	2022 World Cup Qatar	2026 World Cup North America
Mark Geiger (Referee)	Mark Geiger (Referee)	Ismail Elfath (Referee)	Ismail Elfath (Referee)
Sean Hurd (AR)	Jair Marrufo (Referee)	Kyle Atkins (AR)	Tori Penso (Referee)
Joe Fletcher (AR)	Joe Fletcher (AR)	Corey Parker (AR)	Drew Fischer (Referee)
Eric Boria (Support AR)	Frank Anderson (AR)	Kathryn Nesbitt (AR)	Kyle Atkins (AR)
	Corey Rockwell (AR)	Armando Villarreal (VMO)	Corey Parker (AR)
		Drew Fischer (VMO)	Kathryn Nesbitt (AR)
			Brooke Mayo (AR)
			Lyes Arfa (AR)
			Michael Barwegen (AR)
			Joe Dickerson (VMO)
			Armando Villarreal (VMO)

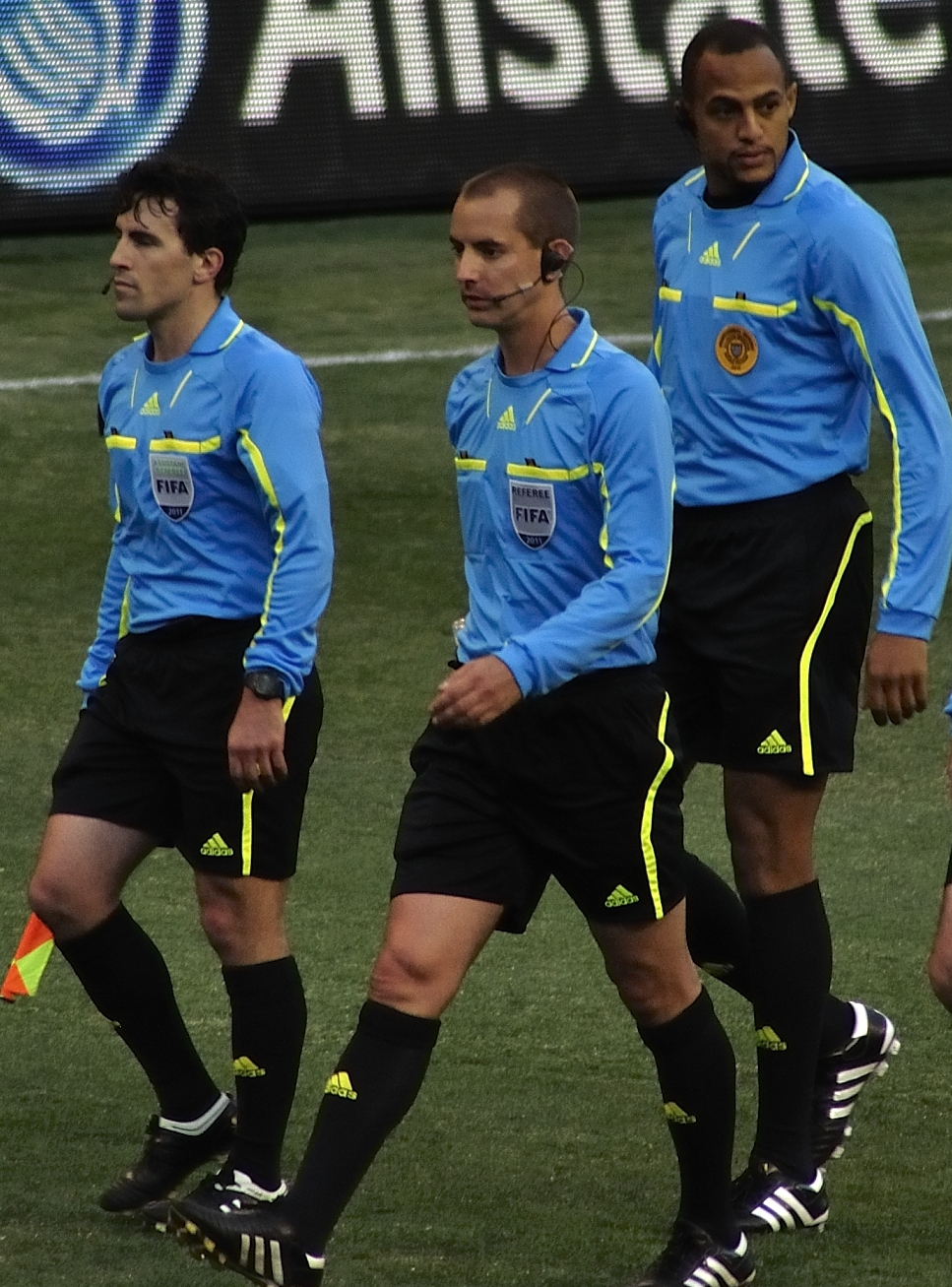
Three of PRO's FIFA World Cup Officials: Eric Boria, Mark Geiger, and Ismail Elfath.

In December 2018, Jair Marrufo as referee, Frank Anderson and Corey Rockwell as assistant referees, and Mark Geiger as an assistant video assistant referee, were selected to oversee the 2018 FIFA Club World Cup final.

At the 2022 World Cup in Qatar, several PRO officials were appointed to the final. Ismail Elfath served as the fourth official, Kathryn Nesbitt was the 5th official, Kyle Atkins was the offside VAR for the match, and Corey Parker was the standby VAR.

In August 2023, six PRO officials were appointed to the FIFA Women's World Cup final—three on-field and three video officials. Tori Penso was chosen to adjudicate the final, alongside assistant referees Brooke Mayo and Kathryn Nesbitt. Also chosen were Support VAR Armando Villarreal, Standby VAR Carol Anne Chenard, and Standby AVAR Drew Fischer.

At the 2026 FIFA World Cup, Ismail Elfath, Kyle Atkins, and Corey Parker took the field for the semifinal between Argentina and England. It was first time a PRO referee has taken charge of a semifinal at a men's World Cup.

== See also ==
- List of MLS Cup Referees
- MLS Referee of the Year Award
- Professional Soccer Referees Association
- List of FIFA international referees
