= MLS Referee of the Year Award =

Annual Major League Soccer award

Major League Soccer

The MLS Referee of the Year is a Major League Soccer award presented to the best referee annually since 1997. Since 2008, the league has also presented an Assistant Referee of the Year award. The awards are voted on by the media, the players, and the club executives.

== Winners ==
Season	Referee	Assistant referee
1997	(Iran) / (United States) Esfandiar Baharmast	Not awarded
1998	(United States) Paul Tamberino	Not awarded
1999	(United States) Paul Tamberino	Not awarded
2000	(United States) Paul Tamberino	Not awarded
2001	(United States) Paul Tamberino	Not awarded
2002	(United States) Kevin Terry	Not awarded
2003	(United States) Brian Hall	Not awarded
2004	(United States) Abiodun Okulaja	Not awarded
2005	(United States) Brian Hall	Not awarded
2006	(United States) Brian Hall	Not awarded
2007	(United States) Brian Hall	Not awarded
2008	(United States) Jair Marrufo	(United States) Kermit Quisenberry
2009	(United States) Alex Prus	(United States) Greg Barkey
2010	(United States) Kevin Stott	(United States) Craig Lowry
2011	(United States) Mark Geiger	(United States) Corey Rockwell
2012	(Canada) Silviu Petrescu	(United States) Ian Anderson
2013	(United States) Hilario Grajeda	(United States) Kermit Quisenberry
2014	(United States) Mark Geiger	(United States) Paul Scott
2015	(Republic of Ireland) Alan Kelly	(United States) Corey Parker
2016	(Republic of Ireland) Alan Kelly	(United States) Frank Anderson
2017	(United States) Allen Chapman	(United States) Corey Parker
2018	(Republic of Ireland) Alan Kelly	(Canada) Joe Fletcher
2019	(United States) Allen Chapman	(United States) Brian Dunn
2020	(United States) Ismail Elfath	(United States) Kathryn Nesbitt
2021	(Poland) / (United States) Robert Sibiga	(United States) Cory Richardson
2022	(United States) Ismail Elfath	(United States) Corey Rockwell
2023	(United States) Victor Rivas	(United States) Ian McKay
2024	(Canada) Drew Fischer	(United States) Kyle Atkins
2025	(Canada) Drew Fischer	(United States) Cory Richardson
2026	(United States) Jon Freemon	(United States) Felisha Mariscal

== See also ==
- Professional Referee Organization
- Referee (association football)
- Assistant referee (association football)
