= Robert Sibiga =

Major League Soccer Referee

- Sibiga during an MLS match
- Born: February 28, 1974
- Other occupation: PRO Referee Coach

Domestic
Years	League	Role
2015-2021	Major League Soccer	Referee

Robert Sibiga is a former referee for the Professional Referee Organization. He refereed in Major League Soccer, and was named referee of the year in 2021.

== Career ==
Robert Sibiga made his MLS debut in 2015 and refereed over 100 Major League Soccer matches in his career. He was selected to referee the MLS All-Star Game in 2018 and was chosen for the MLS Referee of the Year Award at the end of the 2021 season. He was also the referee for the USL final in 2012.

An injury ended Sibiga's career on the field after the 2021 season, but he still remains active mentoring and coaching other referees. He is currently listed as a referee coach for PRO2.
