= Tori Penso =

American soccer referee (born 1986)

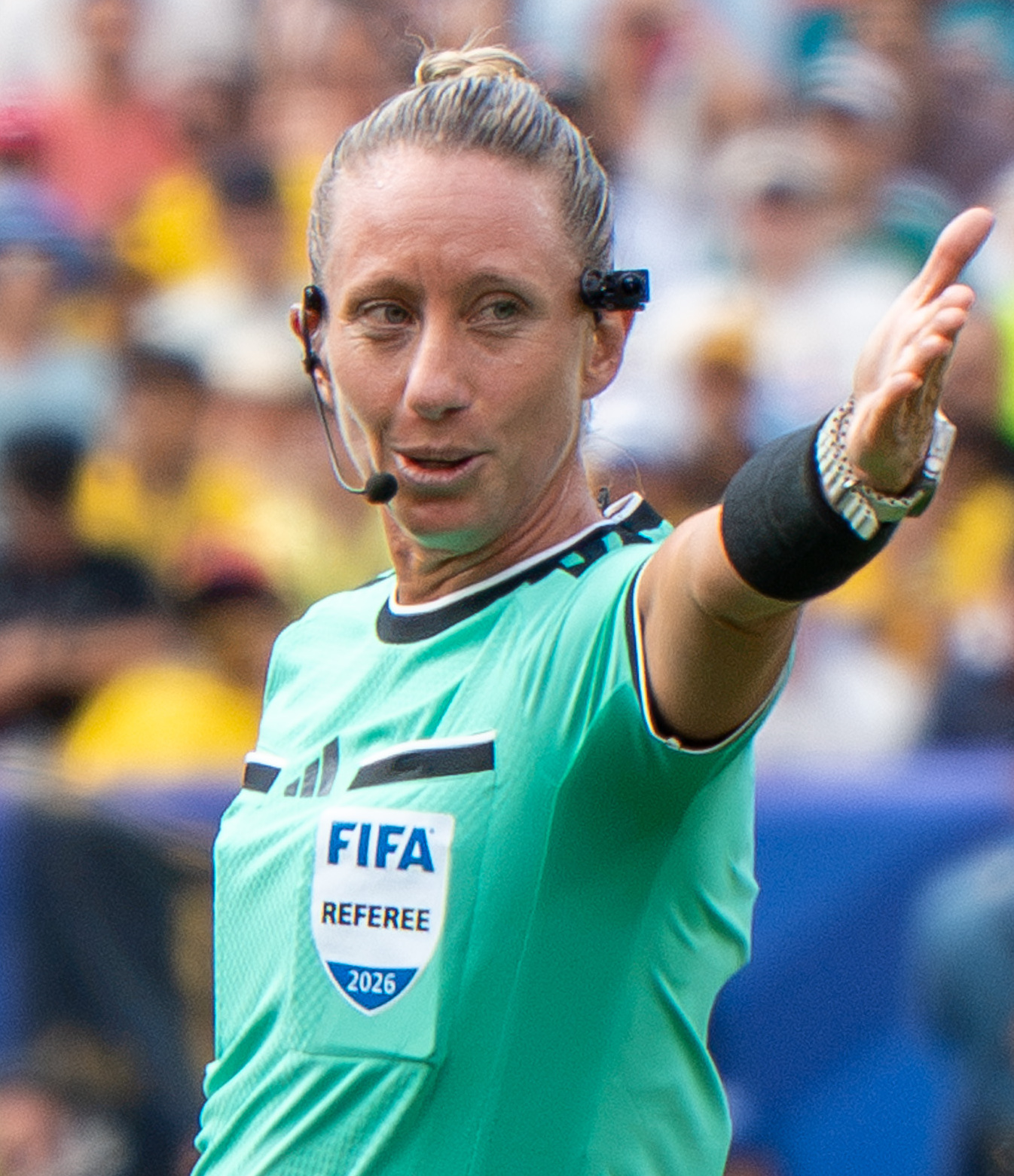
- Penso at the 2026 FIFA World Cup
- Full name: Mary Victoria Penso
- Born: Mary Victoria Hancock; July 8, 1986 (age 40); Stuart, Florida, U.S.
- Other occupation: Digital marketer

Domestic
Years	League	Role
2015–	National Women's Soccer League	Referee
2019–	USL Championship	Referee
2020–	Major League Soccer	Referee

International
Years	League	Role
2021–	FIFA listed	Referee

Mary Victoria Penso (née Hancock; born July 8, 1986) is an American association football referee. Penso was the referee for the 2023 FIFA Women's World Cup final, and was later appointed to the 2026 FIFA World Cup, the first American woman to be a referee at the event. She is currently a member of the Professional Referee Organization and primarily referees in Major League Soccer.

== Career ==
Penso was raised in Stuart, Florida, and began refereeing at the age of 14 alongside her older brothers. She was invited to an Olympic Development Program refereeing camp in Alabama at the age of 18.

=== Domestic ===
Penso joined the United States Soccer Federation as a referee in 2013 and was assigned to women's collegiate tournaments and later the National Women's Soccer League (NWSL). Following the 2019 Generation Adidas Cup, she was invited to join the Professional Referee Organization's PRO2 development program. Penso later served as a fourth official at several Major League Soccer (MLS) and referee in USL Championship matches, in addition to assignments in the NWSL.

On September 25, 2020, she became the fourth woman to referee a MLS match and the first since Sandy Hunt in May 2000. She later refereed the 2021 NWSL Championship. Penso is the first full-time female referee in the league's history.

Penso was assigned as the referee for the 2025 US Open Cup Final between Austin FC and Nashville SC.

=== International ===
==== 2023 FIFA Women's World Cup ====
On January 9, 2023, FIFA appointed her to the officiating pool for the 2023 FIFA Women's World Cup in Australia and New Zealand. Penso was appointed two group stage games, a round of 16 match, and the semi-final between Australia and England.

Penso, along with fellow Americans Kathryn Nesbitt and Brooke Mayo, were appointed to officiate the final—the first referee from the U.S. to have the whistle for a FIFA Womens World Cup final and the first Women's World Cup final referee from the Americas.

==== FIFA Club World Cup ====
Penso officiated the opening match of the 2023 FIFA Club World Cup in Saudi Arabia. She was also assigned the third place match. Penso worked the Club World Cup again in 2025, where she officiated two group stage matches.

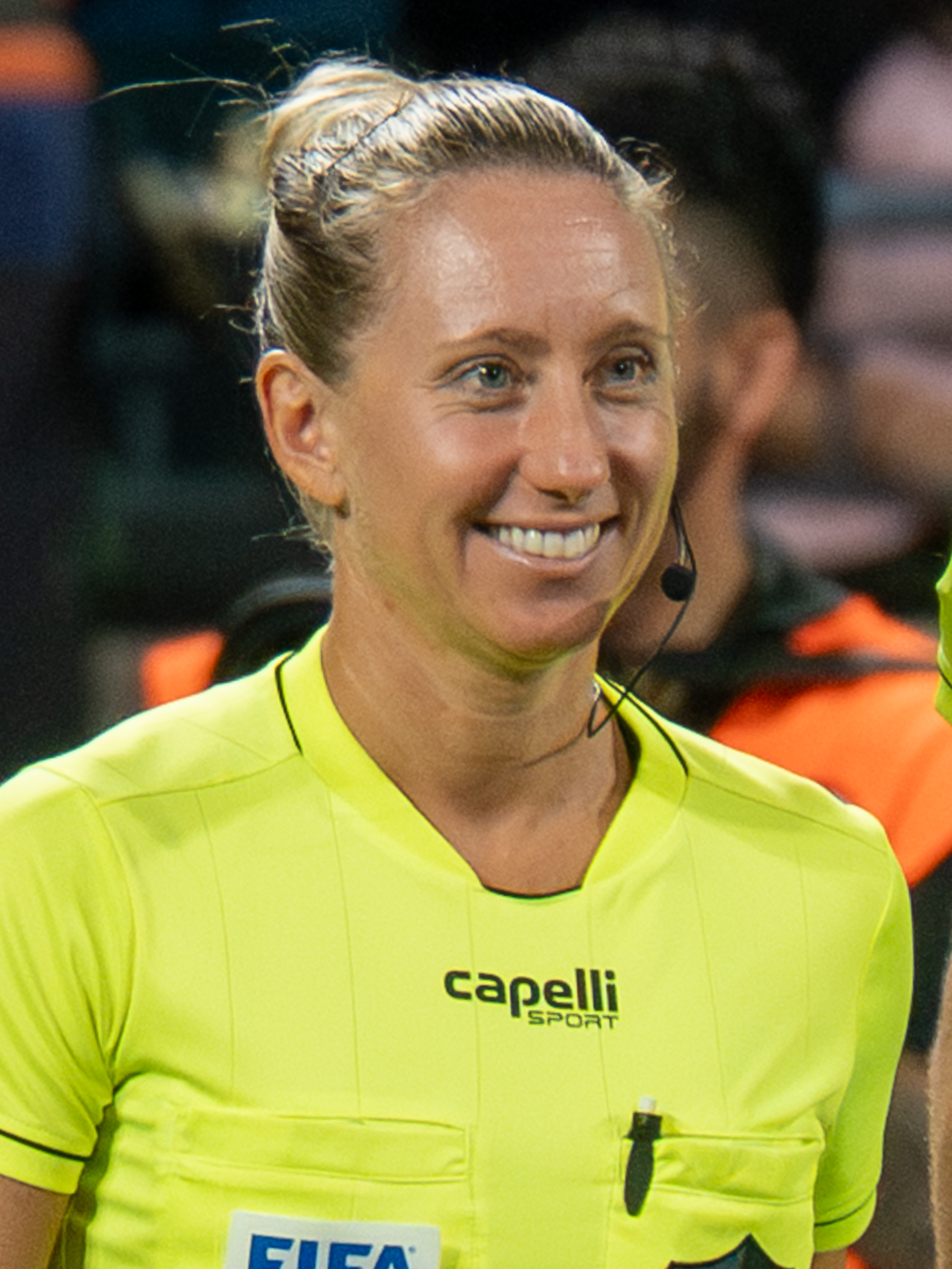
Penso in 2025

==== 2024 Summer Olympics ====
On April 3, 2024, FIFA announced that Penso was appointed to the officiating pool for the 2024 Summer Olympics in Paris. Penso was assigned the opening round Group A match between France and Colombia.

==== 2026 FIFA World Cup ====
Tori Penso was selected as a referee for the 2026 FIFA World Cup in North America alongside Mayo and Nesbitt. Penso is only the second female referee in history to have officiated a men's World Cup match, after Stéphanie Frappart had done so at the 2022 FIFA World Cup. The American trio was assigned to the Group A match between the Czech Republic and South Africa on June 18, 2026, their first game. This made them the first all-female and all-American crew of officials at any men's FIFA World Cup. Penso awarded a penalty to South Africa for a handball offense in the 83rd minute. The match ended in a 1–1 draw.

She was appointed for a second group stage match between Germany and Ecuador. In the 3rd minute, Penso elected not to call a foul against Aleksander Pavlovic that lead to a Germany goal. Penso awarded a penalty to Germany in the 46th minute of the match, but the VAR Joe Dickerson triggered a review and Penso disallowed the penalty due to a foul in the build up. Ecuador won the match 2–1.

2026 FIFA World Cup
Date	Match	Venue	Stage
June 18, 2026	South Africa vs Czech Republic	Atlanta Stadium	Group Stage
June 25, 2026	Germany vs Ecuador	New York New Jersey Stadium	Group Stage

== Personal life ==
Penso is married to Chris Penso, a long-time MLS referee. They have three daughters.

Penso graduated from Florida State University in 2008 with a digital marketing degree. She worked in marketing for Coca-Cola and Red Bull before relocating to Ohio where, in 2015, she earned a Master of Business Administration from the Case Western Reserve University. In addition to refereeing, Penso teaches a University of South Florida course in social media and sports. As of 2026 she lived in Wadsworth, Ohio.

== List of major matches refereed ==
Date	Match	Tournament	Venue	Result	Ref
20 August 2023	Spain vs. England	2023 FIFA Women's World Cup final	Stadium Australia, Sydney	1–0	

Sporting positions
Preceded by (France) Stéphanie Frappart	FIFA Women's World Cup final referee 2023	Succeeded by TBD
