= Brian Hall (referee) =

American soccer referee

- Full name: Brian Hall
- Born: June 5, 1961 (age 65); United States

Domestic
Years	League	Role
1980s–2007	NASL, MLS	Referee

International
Years	League	Role
1992–2007	FIFA-listed	Referee

Brian Hall (born June 5, 1961) is an American former soccer referee from northern California.

== Career ==
He started his professional career as an assistant referee in the NASL at age 19. Hall was a FIFA referee from 1992 until he retired in 2007 at the mandatory retirement age of 45. He was selected for the 2002 FIFA World Cup and refereed two group stage matches. Hall was named Major League Soccer Referee of the Year in 2003, 2005, 2006, and 2007. He refereed the 1997 and 2003 MLS Cup, the 2002 MLS All Star Game, and the 2002 US Open Cup final.

Hall served as the US Soccer Manager of Referee Assessment and Training until 2010. He became the first Director of Referees for CONCACAF in December 2010 and held that post until December 2013. Hall was the match official development manager for the Professional Referee Organization from 2014-2016. He then returned to CONCACAF as the director of referees from 2016-2022.

== World Cup matches officiated ==
Tournament	Date	Venue	Round	Team 1	Result	Team 2
2002	June 3, 2002	Sapporo Dome, Sapporo	First round	Italy	2 – 0	Ecuador
2002	June 12, 2002	Nagai Stadium, Osaka	First round	Nigeria	0 – 0	England
