= Nima Saghafi =

American soccer referee

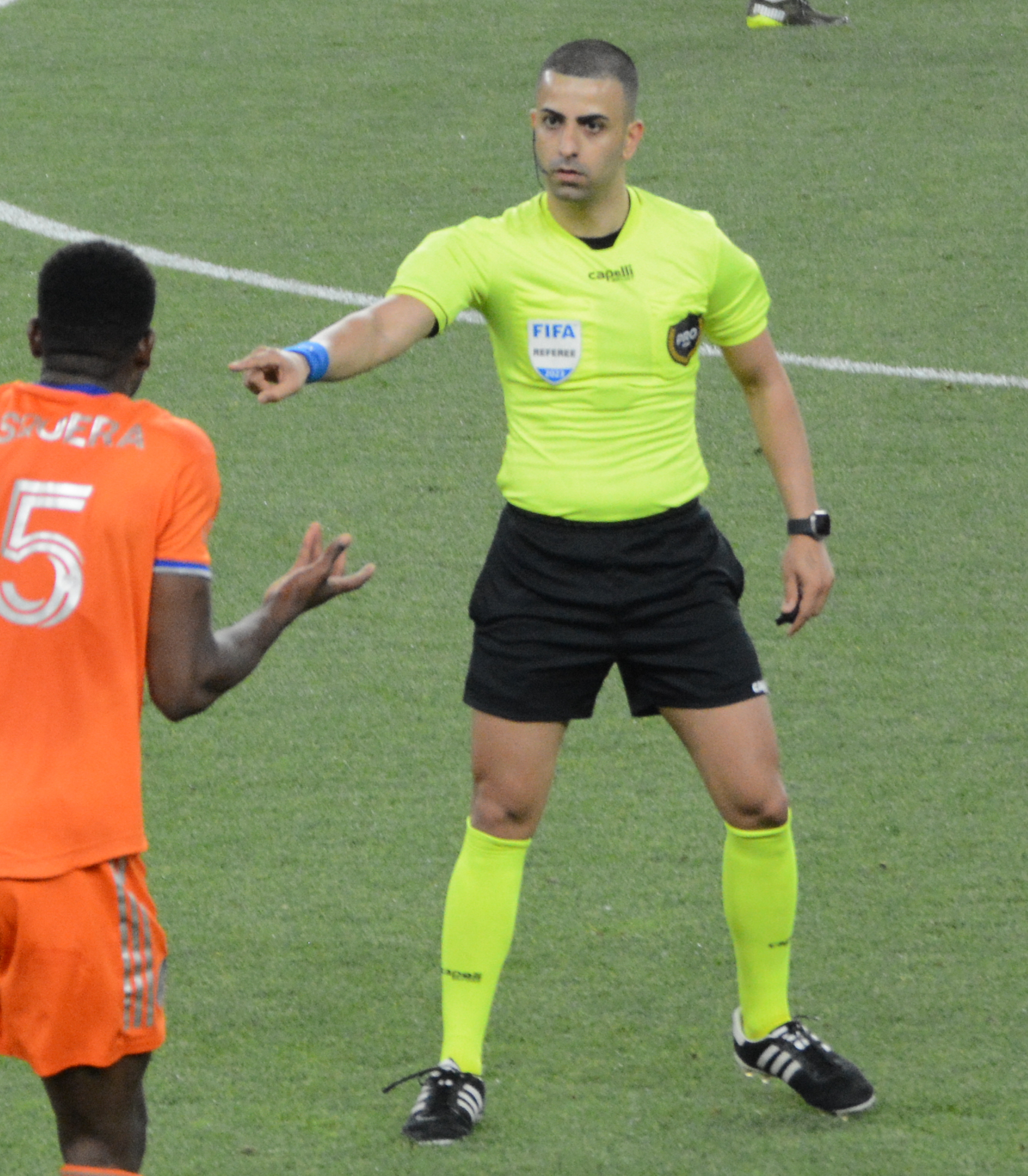
- Saghafi MLS 2023
- Born: January 24, 1990 (age 36); United States

Domestic
| Years | League | |
| 2016– | Major League Soccer | |

International
| Years | League | Role |
| 2020–2023 | FIFA listed | Referee |

Nima Saghafi (born January 24, 1990) is an American soccer referee in Major League Soccer and member of PRO.

== Career ==
Saghafi made his MLS center referee debut on March 20, 2016 in a match between the Philadelphia Union and New England Revolution. He made his international debut on October 16, 2018 in the 2019–20 CONCACAF Nations League qualifying match between Guadeloupe and Aruba. Saghafi was a finalist for the MLS Referee of the Year Award and was selected as the fourth official in the 2018 MLS Cup. He also was the referee for the 2018 US Open Cup final and the 2015 USL Championship final.
