= 2024 MLS referee lockout =

Labor dispute between Major League Soccer and their referees

- Date: February 1 – March 30, 2024 (1 month, 4 weeks and 1 day)
- Location: United States; Canada
- Caused by: Expiration of the previous PRO collective bargaining agreement on January 15, 2024
- Result: Ratification of a new collective bargaining agreement on March 26, 2024; Replacement referees from February 21–March 25

Parties
Professional Soccer Referees Association; Supported by: MLS Players Association	Major League Soccer; Professional Referee Organization

The 2024 MLS referee lockout was a labor dispute between the Professional Referee Organization (PRO), the organization responsible for assigning and managing referees and other match officials for Major League Soccer, and match officials represented by the Professional Soccer Referees Association (PSRA), a labor union for professional match officials in Canada and the United States.

== Timeline ==
On January 15, the previous collective bargaining agreement was set to expire. The PSRA voted to extend the agreement until January 31, but announced the possibility of a work stoppage if certain outstanding issues were not resolved.

On January 22, all voting members of the PSRA voted to authorize strike action in the event that they could not negotiate a favorable collective bargaining agreement with PRO. 100% of participating individuals voted in favor of the potential work stoppage.

On February 17, the PSRA voted to reject a tentative agreement with the PRO, with 95.8% of voting union members voting against ratifying the agreement. The PSRA cited unfair labor practices such as direct dealing, insufficient benefits and compensation, and scheduling issues.

On February 18, PRO locked out the PSRA match officials, and announced that they would assign replacement officials to prevent the postponement of the 2024 Major League Soccer season. The PSRA immediately criticized the decision for being detrimental to the quality of officiating in the league, and referenced an alleged increase in officiating errors during a referee lockout in 2014.

On February 20, the MLS Players Association (MLSPA) made an announcement requesting a quick resolution to the dispute, as well as sharing their concern that the use of replacement officials could be detrimental to the players' health and safety. They also made statement that "all workers deserve a fair wage, safe working conditions, and the ability to collectively bargain in good faith," suggesting that they somewhat supported the PSRA position.

On February 21, the opening match of the regular season as played between Inter Miami CF and Real Salt Lake, with replacement referee Cristian Campo Hernandez taking charge of the match.

On February 25 in the match between LA Galaxy and Inter Miami, replacement referee Gabriele Ciampi controversially sent off (second caution) Mark Delgado for a foul on Sergio Busquets despite replays showing that it was Busquets who initiated contact with Delgado. While shorthanded, LA conceded a goal in additional time which resulted in a 1–1 draw. The decision was generally considered incorrect, including by Busquets himself who stated in an interview that he did not believe the foul to be worthy of a yellow card. Much of the blame was attributed to the league using less experienced replacement referees, with Ciampi struggling to maintain control for the entirety of the match. The league retroactively rescinded Delgado's red card after the match following a successful appeal from the LA Galaxy.

=== Agreement ===
On March 26, the PRO and PSRA announced that they had reached a new collective bargaining agreement that will last until 2030. The PSRA members ratified the agreement by a vote of 72–21. The referees returned to work on March 30. The seven-year agreement is the longest CBA for MLS match officials in MLS history.

== Issues ==
PSRA officials rejected the tentative agreement for the following reasons.

=== Unfair labor practices ===
The PSRA alleged that direct dealing was being committed by managers of PRO, claiming that their members were called individually by PRO representatives to discuss bargaining without union representatives present. The PSRA filed a charge against the PRO with the National Labor Relations Board (NLRB) on January 5.

On February 9, the PSRA filed a second charge with the NLRB, after allegedly receiving a letter from the PRO general manager threatening that if the tentative agreement was not ratified, the PRO would lock out the PSRA match officials, and refuse to agree to favorable terms in future bargaining.

=== League growth and consequences ===
Following their rejection of the tentative agreement, the PSRA stated that the league's recent growth had significantly increased mental demands, physical demands, and the time commitments required of the match officials. The union argued that PRO was not willing to compensate the match officials for these new expectations.

== Results and reactions ==
Prior to the beginning of the season, Major League Soccer announced that they would be testing new rules in the league, such as referees making in-stadium announcements, and enforcing time limits for substitutions and injury stoppages. However, because of the labor dispute, the implementation of the rule changes was postponed to prevent potential officiating controversies while replacement officials were in use.
