= Mark Geiger =

American soccer referee (born 1974)

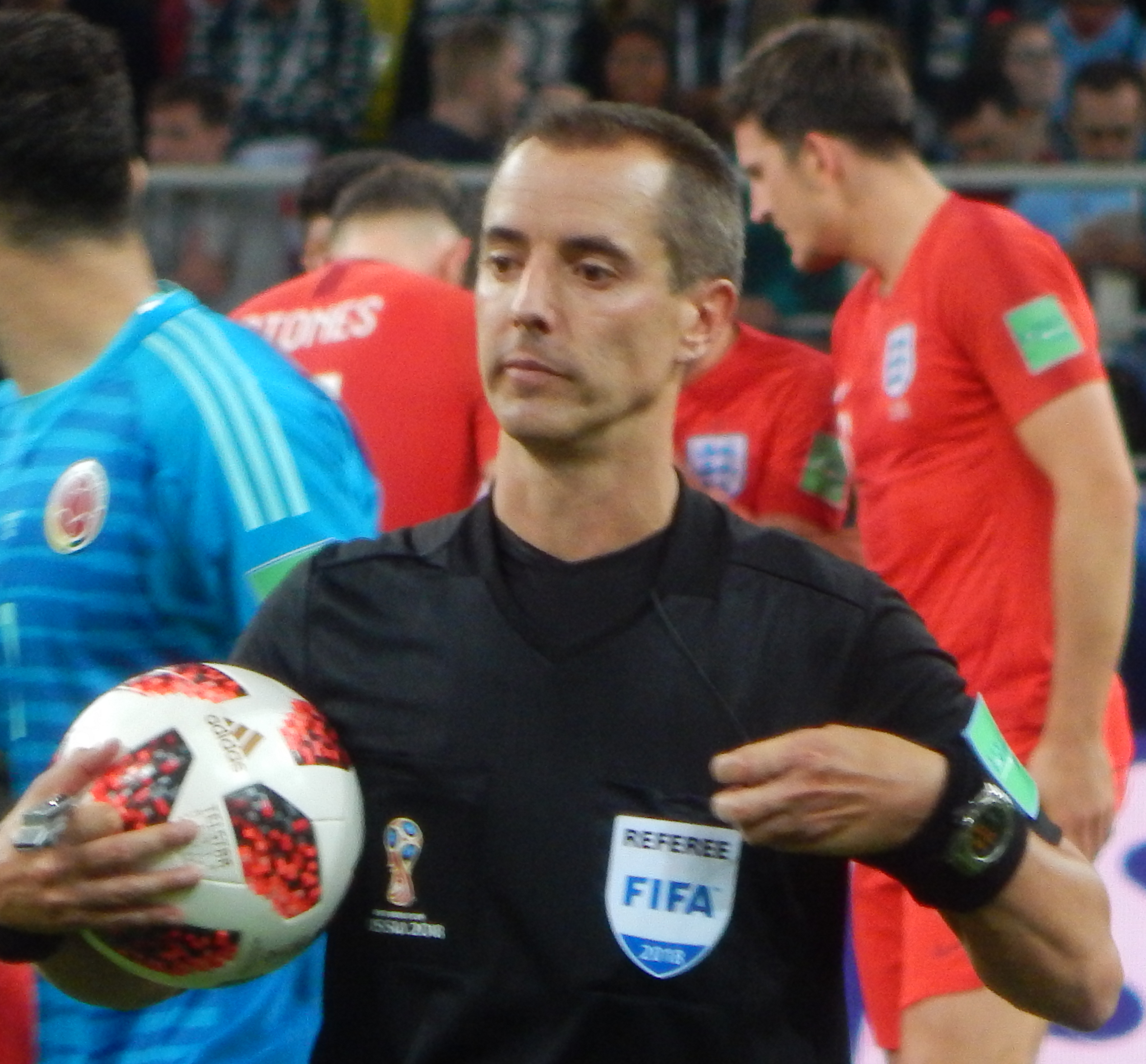
- Geiger in 2018
- Full name: Mark William Geiger
- Born: August 25, 1974 (age 52); Beachwood, New Jersey, U.S.
- Other occupation: General Manager, Professional Referee Organization; Mathematics teacher

Domestic
Years	League	Role
2002–2004	A-League	Referee
2011–2017	NASL	Referee
2004–2019	MLS	Referee

International
Years	League	Role
2008–2019	FIFA listed	Referee

Mark William Geiger (born August 25, 1974) is an American sports administrator and former soccer referee. He is the general manager at the Professional Referee Organization (PRO), which oversees domestic referees in Major League Soccer (MLS).

Geiger previously officiated in MLS and was on the FIFA International Referees List from 2008 to 2019. At the international level, Geiger refereed the 2012 Olympics, the 2013, 2015, and 2017 CONCACAF Gold Cups, and the 2014 and 2018 FIFA World Cups. At the 2014 World Cup, he became the first referee from the United States to officiate a knockout match at a World Cup tournament. Before becoming a full-time referee, Geiger was a high school mathematics teacher.

== Refereeing career ==
Geiger first took up refereeing in 1988. In 2003, he was named Referee of the Year by the New Jersey Soccer Association. He became a United States Soccer Federation National Referee in 2003 and officiated in Major League Soccer from 2004 to 2018. He has officiated in CONCACAF tournaments since becoming a FIFA referee in 2008, and has officiated Gold Cup and other international tournaments and fixtures. Geiger was selected for the CONCACAF U-20 Championship in 2011, where he refereed the final.

=== Major League Soccer ===
Geiger was selected as the Major League Soccer referee of the year for the 2011 season, and then again in 2014. He was the referee for the MLS Cup in 2014

=== 2011 U-20 World Cup ===
Geiger officiated at the 2011 FIFA U-20 World Cup in Colombia. He officiated the Group E game between eventual tournament champions Brazil and Austria at Estadio Metropolitano Roberto Meléndez in Barranquilla. He then took charge of the Group B game between Uruguay and Cameroon at Estadio El Campín in Bogotá. He was appointed to the Round of 16 match between Spain and South Korea at Estadio Palogrande in Manizales. Finally, he refereed the Final with American Assistant Referee Sean Hurd and Canadian Assistant Referee Joe Fletcher, between Brazil and Portugal at Estadio El Campín in Bogotá. This was the first time a referee from the United States has ever officiated a major men's tournament final.

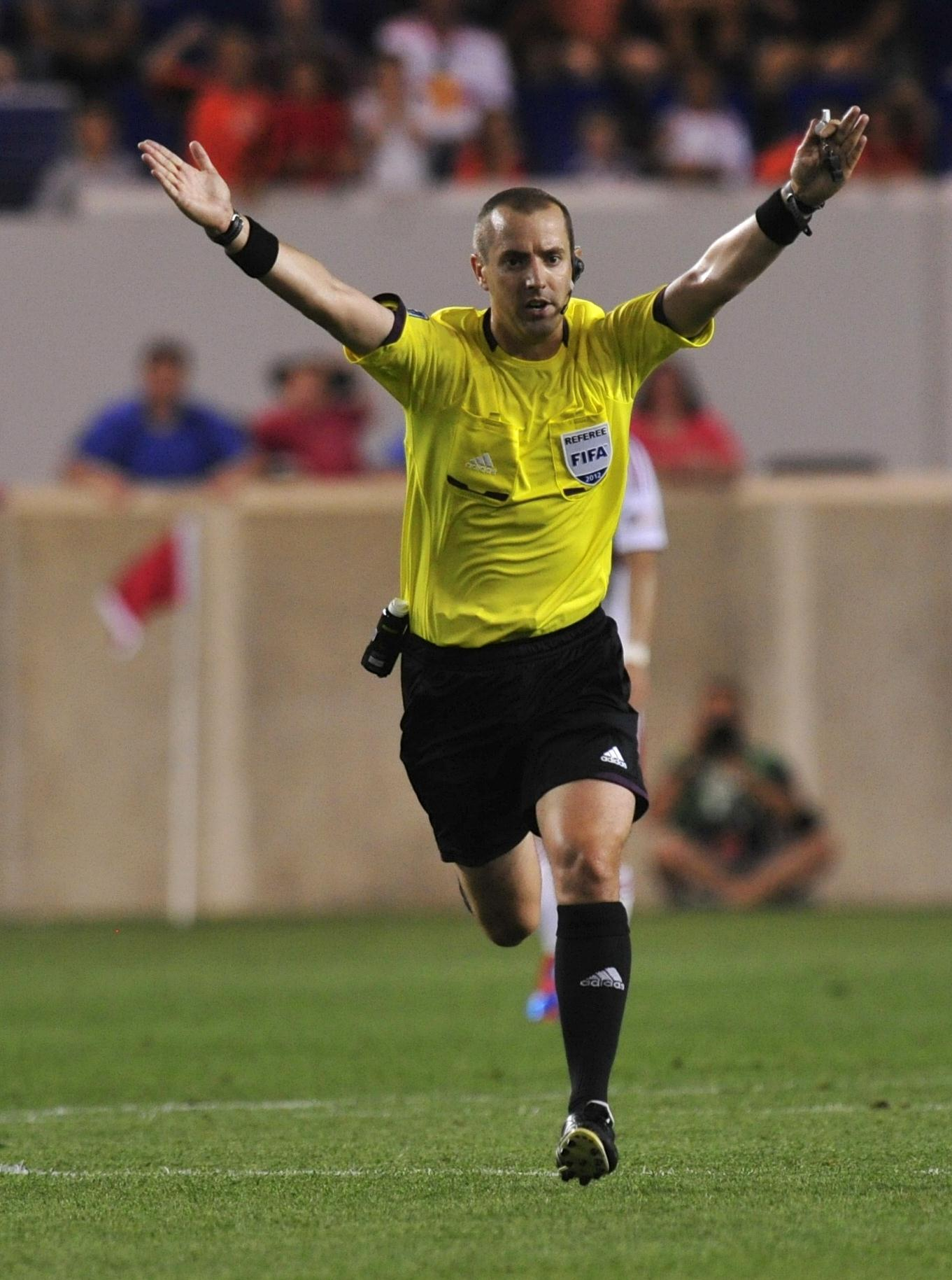
Geiger signalling for advantage during a 2012 MLS match

=== 2012 Summer Olympics ===
In 2012, Geiger was selected as one of 16 referees to officiate at the 2012 Summer Olympics in London. Geiger took charge of the Group D match between Spain vs. Japan and the quarterfinal between Japan vs. Egypt.

=== 2013 Club World Cup ===
Geiger was selected as CONCACAF's representative referee for the 2013 Club World Cup. He took charge of the match for fifth place, which was between Al Ahly and Monterrey.

=== 2014 FIFA World Cup ===
Geiger was one of 25 referees appointed for the 2014 FIFA World Cup in Brazil. Geiger described the assignment to the World Cup as "an immensely proud moment". Geiger officiated the 2014 World Cup Group C match between Colombia and Greece at the Estadio Mineirão in Belo Horizonte; the 2014 World Cup Group B match between Chile and Spain at the Maracanã Stadium in Rio de Janeiro; and the 2014 World Cup Round of 16 match between France and Nigeria at the Estádio Nacional in Brasilia, the first American to referee in the knockout round of a FIFA World Cup.

=== 2016 Copa America Centenario ===
In 2016, Geiger was selected as a referee for the 2016 Copa America Centenario, which was hosted in the United States. Geiger had the whistle for the group stage match between Brazil and Haiti.

=== 2017 FIFA Confederations Cup ===
Geiger was selected to officiate the 2017 FIFA Confederations Cup in Russia. In the Group Stage, Geiger officiated the Group B match between Australia and Germany in Sochi as well as the Group A match between New Zealand and Portugal in Saint Petersburg.

=== 2017 Club World Cup ===
In 2017, Geiger was selected as a VAR for the Club World Cup. Geiger was assigned as a VAR for several matches, then was named the VAR for the final between Real Madrid and Gremio.

=== 2018 FIFA World Cup ===
Geiger was one of 36 referees selected for the 2018 FIFA World Cup, working with a North American crew of Joe Fletcher from Canada and Frank Anderson from the United States. Geiger served as referee on three matches at the tournament and was VAR in five matches.

Geiger's first assignment was the second group stage match of Group B between Portugal and Morocco. Geiger worked as the VAR In the match between Denmark and Australia. During the match he advised the referee, Antonio Mateu Lahoz, to review a possible handball in the penalty area. After review, Lahoz awarded a penalty kick that allowed the Socceroos to score and secure a 1–1 draw. He subsequently worked as VAR for the Group D match between Argentina and Iceland, the Group G match featuring Belgium and Tunisia and the Round of 16 contest between Uruguay and Portugal before his final assignment in the tournament's match for third place.

Geiger then officiated the Group F third match between South Korea and Germany. South Korea defeated Germany 2–0, but neither team advanced since Sweden defeated Mexico. He then officiated at the Round of 16 game between Colombia and England. England advanced on penalties after a 1–1 draw. Geiger was selected as one of the final 12 referees on the shortlist to officiate the final or match for third place, and was ultimately selected to be VAR on the match for third place between Belgium and England.

=== Retirement ===
On January 9, 2019, Geiger announced that he would retire from refereeing and take up a position within PRO as its director of senior match officials.

== Controversies ==
Geiger has been criticized for making controversial calls, such as the 2015 Gold Cup semi final between Panama and Mexico, when he called a controversial penalty for Mexico with Panama up 1–0 in the 90th minute. He admitted to making mistakes in that match as well. Panamanian Football Federation president Pedro Chaluja said the match was "fixed", and he also wanted FIFA and CONCACAF to investigate.

== Management ==
Following his retirement in 2019, Geiger took up a position within PRO as its manager of senior match officials. He served in that role until 2022. Geiger also served as an educator for several FIFA events. He was a VAR instructor for both the 2019 Women's World Cup and the 2022 Men's World Cup in Qatar.

After the 2022 season, Howard Webb announced that he was leaving his general manager position at PRO to become the chief refereeing officer in England. Mark Geiger was later promoted as the new general manager on February 3, 2023.

Geiger was the GM during the 2024 MLS referee lockout. PRO had to use replacement referees for the first six matchdays of the season. During the lockout, Geiger and other managers from PRO had to fill in as video assistant referees.

== FIFA World Cup record ==
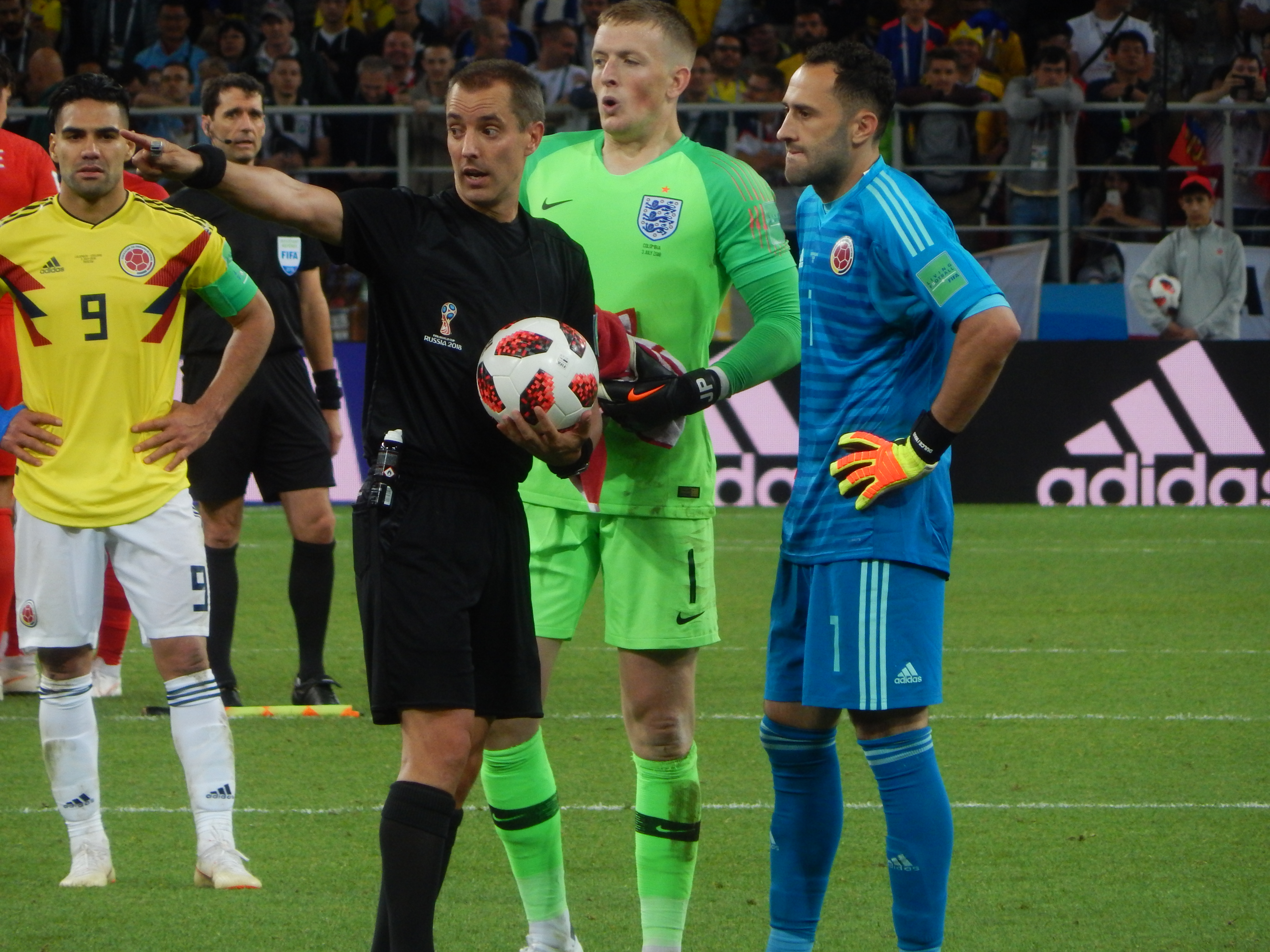
Mark Geiger and goalkeepers Jordan Pickford from England and David Ospina from Colombia before the penalty shootout in the Round of 16

2014 FIFA World Cup – Brazil
Date	Match	Venue	Round
June 14, 2014	Colombia 3–0 Greece	Belo Horizonte	Group stage
June 18, 2014	Spain 0–2 Chile	Rio de Janeiro	Group stage
June 30, 2014	France 2–0 Nigeria	Brasília	Round of 16
2018 FIFA World Cup – Russia
Date	Match	Venue	Round
June 20, 2018	Portugal 1–0 Morocco	Moscow	Group stage
June 27, 2018	South Korea 2–0 Germany	Kazan	Group stage
July 3, 2018	Colombia 1–1 England	Moscow	Round of 16

== Personal life ==
Geiger was born on August 25, 1974, and grew up in Beachwood, New Jersey. After studying teaching at Trenton State College, he became a mathematics teacher at Lacey Township High School in Lanoka Harbor, New Jersey, a role that he gave up to become a full-time referee. While at Lacey Township High School, Geiger was among 103 recipients of the Presidential Award for Excellence in Math and Science Teaching in 2010.

== Honors ==
- New Jersey Soccer Association Referee of the Year: 2003
- Morgan J. Hellebuyck North American Officials Award 2006
- MLS Referee of the Year: 2011, 2014
- CONCACAF Referee of the Year: 2014
