= Hilario Grajeda =

American soccer referee (born 1967)

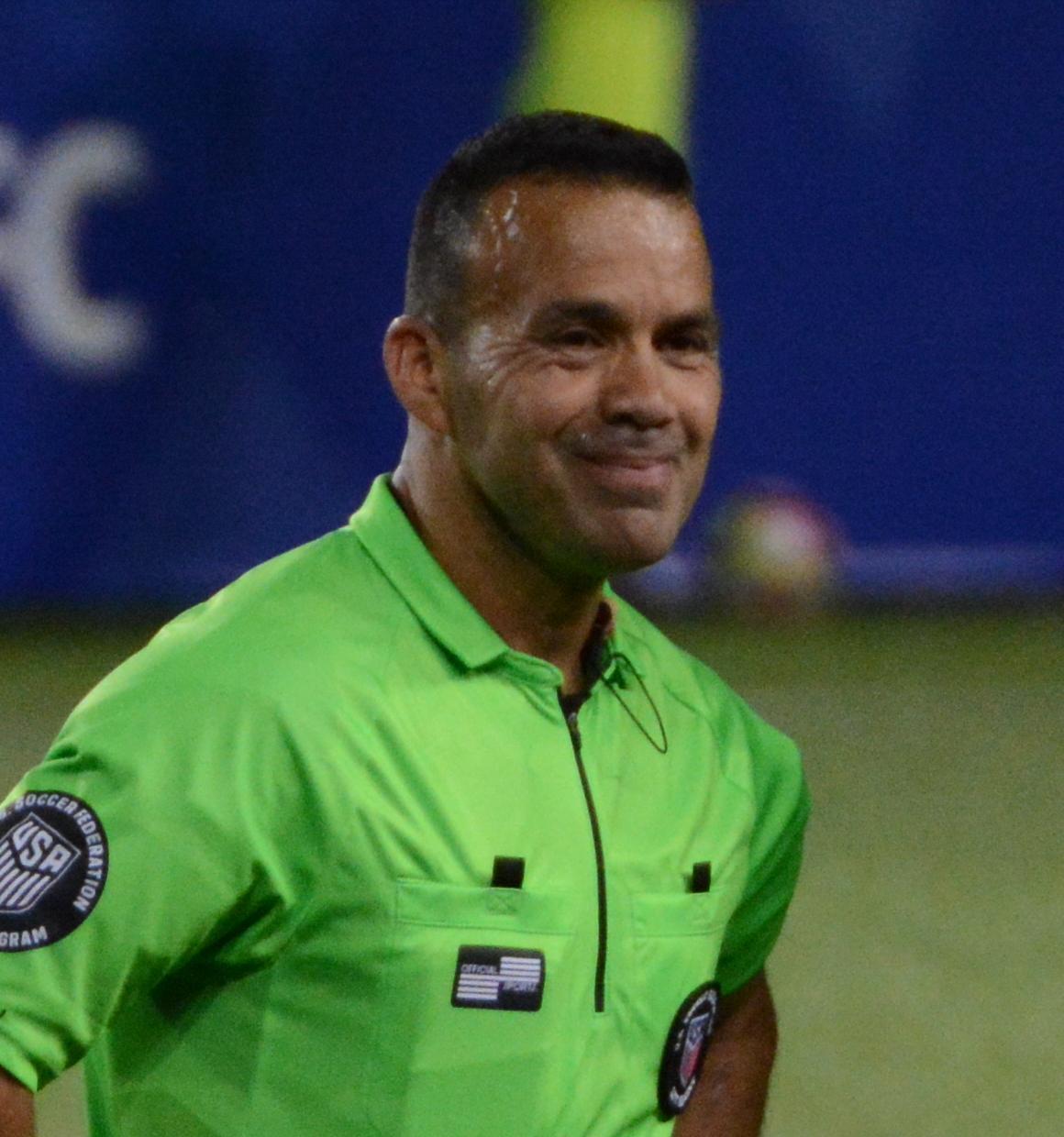
- Grajeda at a 2017 U.S. Open Cup match
- Born: September 2, 1967 (age 59)

Domestic
Years	League	Role
2004–2018	Major League Soccer	Referee
2019–2021	Major League Soccer	Video Assistant Referee

Hilario Grajeda (born September 2, 1967) is an American soccer referee. He was a referee in Major League Soccer from 2004-2018.

== Career ==
His first match in MLS was a game between Dallas Burn and Kansas City Wizards in July 2004. On July 31, 2013, he was the first referee to try out the "Ref Cam" in a friendly game between A.S. Roma and MLS All-Stars, a head-mounted camera that gives the fans the opportunity to see the game in the referee's point of view.

Grajeda was selected as the referee for the 2013 MLS Cup between Sporting KC and Real Salt Lake and was named MLS Referee of the Year. He also whistled the US Open Cup final in 2017.

After the 2018 season, Grajeda transition to primarily performing the role of Video Assistant Referee. He remained on the PRO VAR roster through 2021.

== Card statistics ==
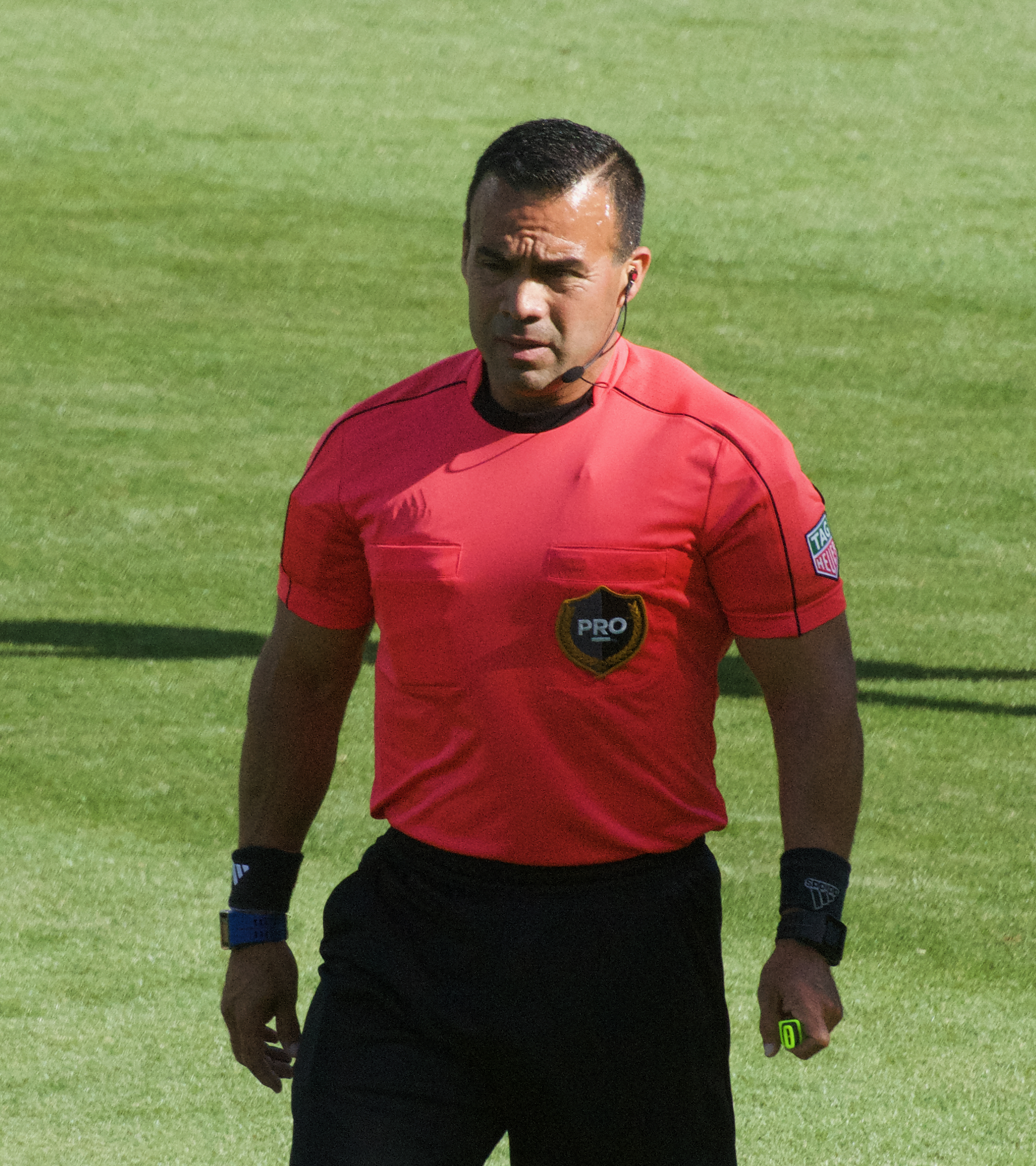
Grajeda at a 2017 Major League Soccer match

Major League Soccer
Season	G	(yellow card) Tot	(yellow card) PG	(red card) Tot	(red card) PG
2013	24	68	2.83	4	0.17
2014	21	80	3.81	2	0.1
2015	2	6	3	0	0
2016	17	49	2.88	4	0.24
2017	17	68	4	1	0.06
2018	20	56	2.8	5	0.25

Updated to matches played on January 14, 2023.
Source: https://proreferees.com/stats/referee-stats/

== Honors ==
- MLS Referee of the Year: 2013
