= Lyes Arfa =

Canadian football assistant referee

- Arfa during an MLS match in 2026
- Born: June 12, 1986 (age 40); Moscow, Russia

Domestic
| Years | League | Role |
| 2020– | Major League Soccer | Assistant Referee |

International
| Years | League | Role |
| 2021– | FIFA | Referee |

Lyes Arfa (born June 12, 1986) is a Canadian football assistant referee who has been listed on the FIFA International Referees List since 2021.

Arfa was born in Moscow, Russia, but grew up in Bejaia, Algeria. He is the older brother of Olympic fencer Fares Arfa.

== Career ==
Arfa began working in Major League Soccer in 2020 and became a FIFA assistant referee in 2021. Arfa has worked the CONCACAF Nations League, the 2024 Summer Olympics, and the 2025 FIFA Club World Cup.

Lyes Arfa was selected for the 2026 FIFA World Cup in North America, becoming part of the first all-Canadian referee crew to officiate a men's World Cup alongside Drew Fischer and Michael Barwegen.
