= Brooke Mayo =

American soccer referee

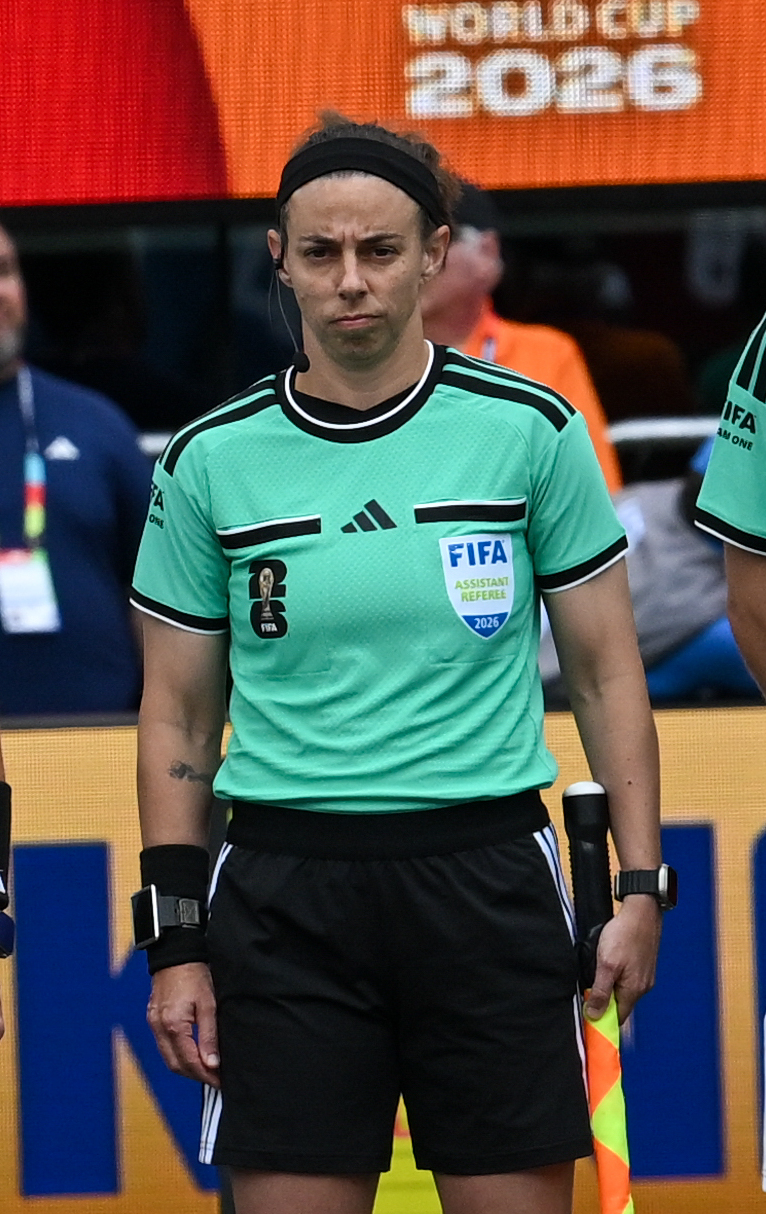
- Mayo World Cup 2026
- Born: 1988 or 1989 (age 37–38); Garland, Texas, U.S.

Domestic
Years	League	Role
2016–present	NWSL	Assistant referee
2020–present	MLS	Assistant referee

International
Years	League	Role
2018–present	FIFA	Assistant referee
2023-present	FIFA	VAR

Brooke Ashley Mayo (born 1988 or 1989) is an American soccer assistant referee who has been listed on the FIFA International Referees List since 2018. She worked the 2023 Women's World Cup final, and the 2026 FIFA World Cup.

== Career ==
Mayo was born in Garland, Texas, and began playing soccer at the age of four. She played recreationally until the age of 13, when she joined competitive leagues. At the same age, Mayo took up refereeing, alternating between being a player and a referee. After graduating from high school, Mayo moved to Tennessee, where she was granted an athletic scholarship at Tennessee Tech University. There she joined the Golden Eagles team in 2007 while continuing to referee and assisting in coaching.

She stated in an interview with the magazine Out that she moved away from the South to be "authentic" to herself. Before leaving Tennessee, she helped open a high school when she was 23 years old. Mayo subsequently pursued a career as an assistant referee, taking part in NWSL for two years before earning her FIFA badge in 2018. In 2020, she also began overseeing games at Major League Soccer.

Among her international achievements, Mayo was appointed to the 2022 CONCACAF W Championship, several editions of the SheBelieves Cup and the 2022 FIFA U-20 Women's World Cup in Costa Rica. One year later, she was selected for the 2023 FIFA Women's World Cup in Australia and New Zealand, where she was part of the officiating trio in the final between Spain and England. Along with Mayo was assistant referee Kathryn Nesbitt, both serving under pitch referee Tori Penso. The trio also served at the 2024 Summer Olympics in Paris. She was also awarded the U.S. Soccer Referee of the Year in 2025.

Mayo was appointed in April 2026 to the 2026 FIFA World Cup in North America, working together with Penso and Nesbitt again. The trio was assigned to the Group A match between the Czech Republic and South Africa as a first game. This made them the first all-female and all-American crew of officials at any men's FIFA World Cup.

== Personal life ==
Mayo lives in Johnstown, Colorado, and works as a substitute teacher at a high school and assisting in sports coaching. She is openly lesbian and was recognized as the first openly gay match official to referee a match at a men's world cup.
