= Kevin Stott =

American soccer referee

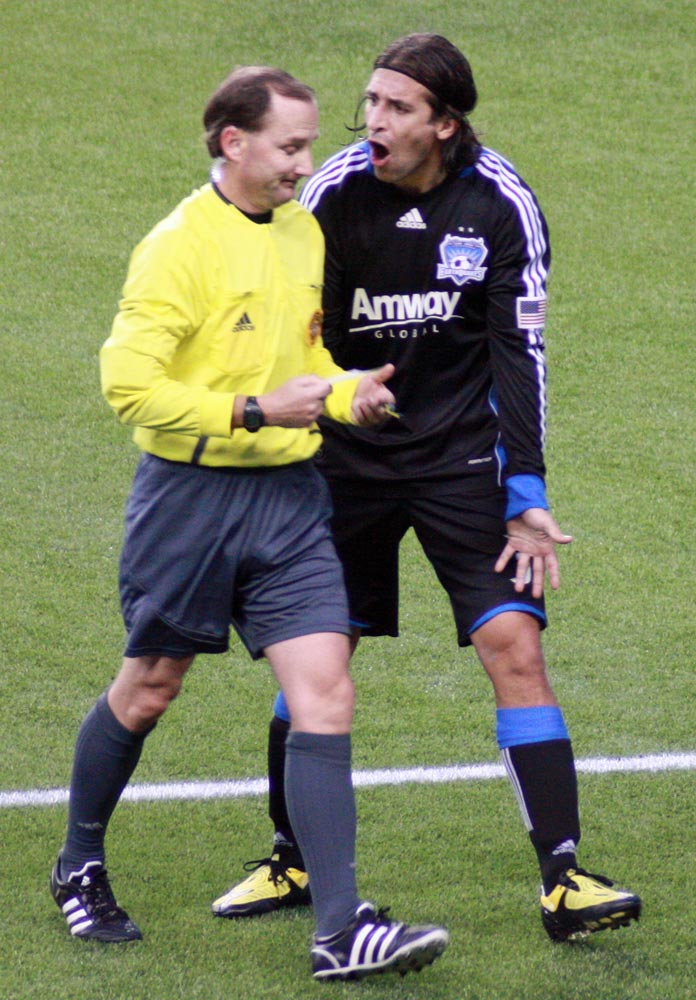
- Stott in 2009
- Born: 1967 (age 58–59)
- Other occupation: Middle School Teacher

Domestic
Years	League	Role
1996-2022	Major League Soccer	Referee
2022-		VAR

International
Years	League	Role
1995–2008	FIFA Listed	Referee

Kevin Stott (born 1967) is a soccer referee for PRO from the United States. He was a FIFA referee from 1995 to 2008. Stott was selected as a support referee for the 2006 FIFA World Cup in Germany.

== Career ==
Stott was selected as MLS Referee of the Year in 2010, after being selected as a finalist seven times. He was the referee for the MLS Cup in 2001, 2005, and 2009. He was also the VAR for the MLS Cup in 2023, and the fourth official in 2000, 2006, and 2017.

Stott was given a referee assignment for an MLS Cup Playoff game every season for 26 straight years.

Stott was the referee for the US Open Cup final in 2000. He also refereed matches at the U20 and U17 World Cups, CONCACAF Gold Cups, CONCACAF Champions League, and World Cup Qualifiers.

Stott transitioned to the primary role of a VAR in 2022, after 27 years on the field as a referee in MLS.

== Personal life ==
Stott lives in California and works as a middle school math teacher. He was named an outstanding teacher of the year by the San Bernardino County in 2023.

== Card statistics ==
Major League Soccer
Season	G	(yellow card) Tot	(yellow card) PG	(red card) Tot	(red card) PG
2013	14	33	2.36	1	0.07
2014	16	43	2.69	3	0.19

Updated to matches played on November 3, 2014.
Source: http://www.proreferees.com/stats-referee-stats.php
