= Serhiy Boyko =

Ukrainian football referee (born 1977)

- Boyko in 2026

Personal information
- Full name: Serhiy Mykolayovych Boyko
- Date of birth: 30 June 1977 (age 49)
- Place of birth: Bilhorod-Dnistrovskyi, Ukrainian SSR, Soviet Union
- Height: 1.82 m (5 ft 11 1/2 in)
- Position: Goalkeeper

Senior career*
Years	Team	Apps	(Gls)
1995–1996	FC Dnistrovets; Bilhorod-Dnistrovskyi	11	(0)
1997–1999	FC Portovyk Illichivsk	17	(0)
Refereeing career
Domestic
Years	League	Role
2008–2021	Ukrainian Premier League	Referee
2023–	Major League Soccer	Referee
International
Years	League	Role
2011–2022	FIFA listed	Referee
2011–2022	UEFA listed (Cat 2)	
- * Club domestic league appearances and goals

Serhiy Mykolayovych Boyko (Ukrainian: Сергій Миколайович Бойко; born 30 June 1977) is a Ukrainian international referee and a former player. Boiko became a FIFA referee in 2011. He has refereed at 2014 FIFA World Cup qualifiers, beginning with the match between Sweden and Kazakhstan.

During the Russian invasion of Ukraine, he became a refugee in the United States and continued working as a referee within the Professional Referee Organization in the United States. He officiated USL Championship games as both a match referee and 4th official, and on 15 April he served as match referee for the MLS regular season match between Real Salt Lake and FC Dallas.
