= Victor Rivas (referee) =

American soccer referee

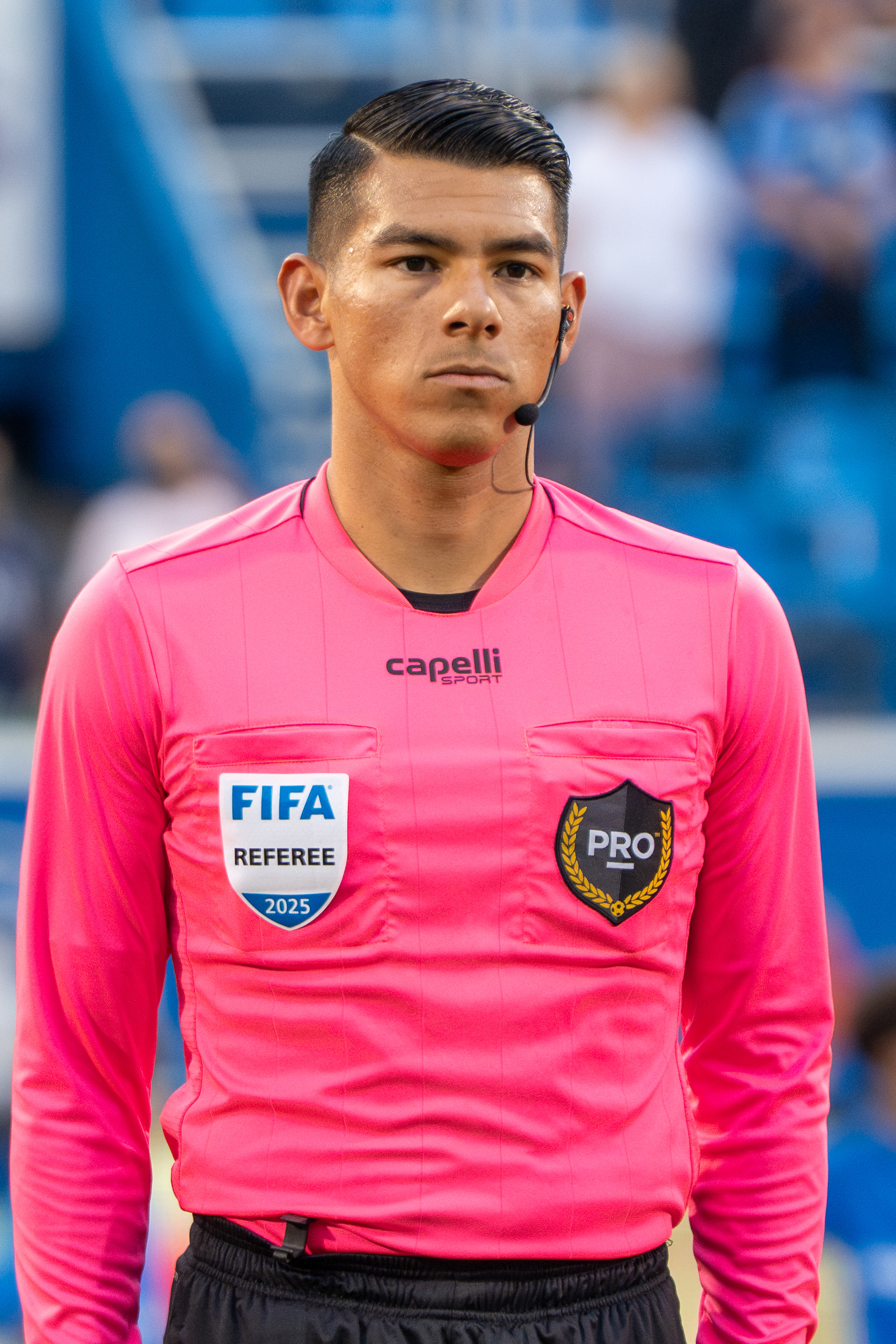
- Rivas in 2025
- Full name: Victor Manuel Rivas
- Born: January 26, 1987 (age 39)

Domestic
Years	League	Role
2018–	Major League Soccer	Referee

International
Years	League	Role
2023–	FIFA	Referee

Victor Manuel Rivas (born January 26, 1987) is an American soccer referee with the Professional Referee Organization. He primarily referees in Major League Soccer.

== Career ==
Rivas began refereeing in California when he was 17 years old. He began rising through the ranks and officiated matches in the USL and NASL.

Rivas made his Major League Soccer refereeing debut on May 12, 2018. He earned his FIFA badge at the start of the 2023 season. Rivas took charge of his first MLS playoff match in 2022, and officiated a semifinal in 2023. He was also the fourth official for the 2021 MLS All-Star Game. In 2023, Rivas was named the MLS Referee of the Year.

Rivas has additionally been chosen for several international events. He has officiated matches at the CONCACAF Under-17 and Under-20 Championships, the CONCACAF Caribbean Cup, and in the CONCACAF Champions Cup. He has also refereed various Leagues Cup matches.

== Personal life ==
Victor Rivas resides in California, and was a swim coach before transitioning to full time refereeing.
