= Ismail Elfath =

American soccer referee (born 1982)

- Elfath in 2019
- Born: March 3, 1982 (age 44); Casablanca, Morocco
- Other occupation: IT Software Sales

Domestic
Years	League	Role
2012–2026	Major League Soccer	Referee

International
Years	League	Role
2016–2026	FIFA	Referee
2022-2024	FIFA	VAR

Ismail Elfath (Arabic: اسماعيل الفتح; born March 3, 1982) is a former soccer referee. Born in Morocco, he worked for the Professional Referee Organization, and refereed Major League Soccer matches. Elfath was FIFA listed referee from 2016 through 2026, and was selected to two FIFA World Cups. He was the fourth official for the 2022 World Cup final.

== Early life ==
Born in Morocco, Elfath immigrated to the United States in 2001 at the age of 18 after winning a Diversity Immigrant Visa. Elfath graduated from the University of Texas at Austin with a degree in mechanical engineering in 2006. As of 2026, Elfath resides in Austin, Texas. He later became a naturalized US citizen.

== Career ==
Elfath was first a Fourth official in MLS in 2011 and made his MLS refereeing debut in 2012. Elfath became a FIFA listed official in 2016.

=== Domestic ===
Elfath was the referee during an August 2016 match between New York Red Bulls II and Orlando City B where the worldwide first on-field Video Assistant Referee review took place as the system was being tested in USL. Elfath was assigned the referee for the USL final between Orlando City and Charlotte Eagles in 2013. Then, in 2015, Elfath took charge of the MLS All Star Game. Elfath was named the MLS Referee of the Year for the first time in his career on November 18, 2020. He received the honor for a second time two years later on October 14, 2022. He was the referee for the MLS Cup in 2022 when LAFC hosted the Philadelphia Union.

=== International ===
On March 26, 2019, Elfath was selected to referee the 2019 FIFA U-20 World Cup in Poland. Elfath, along with American assistant referees Corey Parker and Kyle Atkins, was selected by FIFA to officiate the final of the tournament, which Ukraine won 3-1 over South Korea. On May 17, 2019, Elfath was appointed to officiate in the 2019 CONCACAF Gold Cup in the United States following his participation in the 2019 FIFA U-20 World Cup. Later that year Elfath took charge of the semi-final match at the FIFA Qatar 2019 Club World Cup.

In July 2021, Elfath took charge of three matches at the Tokyo 2020 Olympics, including a quarter-final match between host nation Japan and New Zealand. Elfath was chosen as one of the two referees from CONCACAF for the 2021 Africa Cup of Nations held in Cameroon from January 9 to February 6, 2022.

Ismail Elfath represented the United States at the 2024 Copa America. At the event, he suffered a knee injury that took him off the field for over a year to recover. Elfath returned in 2025 and was selected as a referee for the 2025 FIFA Intercontinental Cup. He was appointed as the referee for the final between PSG and Flamengo. Elfath was the referee for the 2026 CONCACAF Champions Cup Final between Toluca FC and Tigres UANL.

On October 11, 2026, Elfath announced his retirement from refereeing.

=== FIFA World Cups ===
==== 2022 FIFA World Cup Qatar ====
During the 2022 FIFA World Cup in Qatar, Elfath made his World Cup debut during the group H match between Portugal and Ghana. He awarded a penalty to Portugal in the 63rd minute and Portugal won the match 3-2. His second group stage match was between Cameroon and Brazil. In stoppage time, Vincent Aboubakar scored the game winning goal and removed his shirt in celebration. Elfath shook the hand of Aboubakar as he sent him off for a second yellow card.

Elfath was appointed Round of 16 match between Japan and Croatia, where Croatia advanced on penalties. He was later selected as the fourth official for the Final between Argentina and France. Ismail Elfath, Kathryn Nesbitt, Kyle Atkins, and Corey Parker were the first Americans to work a World Cup final.

==== 2026 FIFA World Cup North America ====
Ismail Elfath was selected as a referee for the 2026 FIFA World Cup in North America with his assistants Corey Parker and Kyle Atkins. His first appointment was a group stage match between Japan and the Netherlands at the Dallas Stadium. The match ended in a 2-2 draw. He was appointed to another group stage match between Uruguay and Spain. In stoppage time, Elfath sent off Agustín Canobbio from Uruguay for a dangerous challenge. Spain won the match 1-0, and Uruguay was eliminated from the tournament.

Elfath was appointed to a round of 16 knockout match between Brazil and Norway. In the tenth minute of the match the VAR, Tatiana Guzman sent Elfath to the monitor where he awarded a penalty to Brazil. In stoppage time, Elfath whistled another penalty for Brazil for a careless challenge. Nevertheless, Norway advanced to the quarterfinals 2–1. Elfath was further appointed for the semifinal match between England and Argentina, making him the first American to whistle a World Cup semifinal. Elfath issued four yellow cards in the match, and Argentina advanced to the final.

2022 FIFA World Cup
Date	Match	Venue	Round
November 4, 2022	Portugal vs Ghana	Stadium 974	Group Stage
December 2, 2022	Cameroon vs Brazil	Lusail Stadium	Group Stage
December 5, 2022	Japan vs Croatia	Al Janoub Stadium	Round of 16

2026 FIFA World Cup
Date	Match	Venue	Round
June 14, 2026	Japan vs Netherlands	Dallas Stadium	Group Stage
June 26, 2026	Uruguay vs Spain	Guadalajara Stadium	Group Stage
July 5, 2026	Brazil vs Norway	New York New Jersey Stadium	Round of 16
July 15, 2026	England vs Argentina	Atlanta Stadium	Semifinal

== See also ==
- List of football referees
