= Alan Kelly (referee) =

Irish football referee

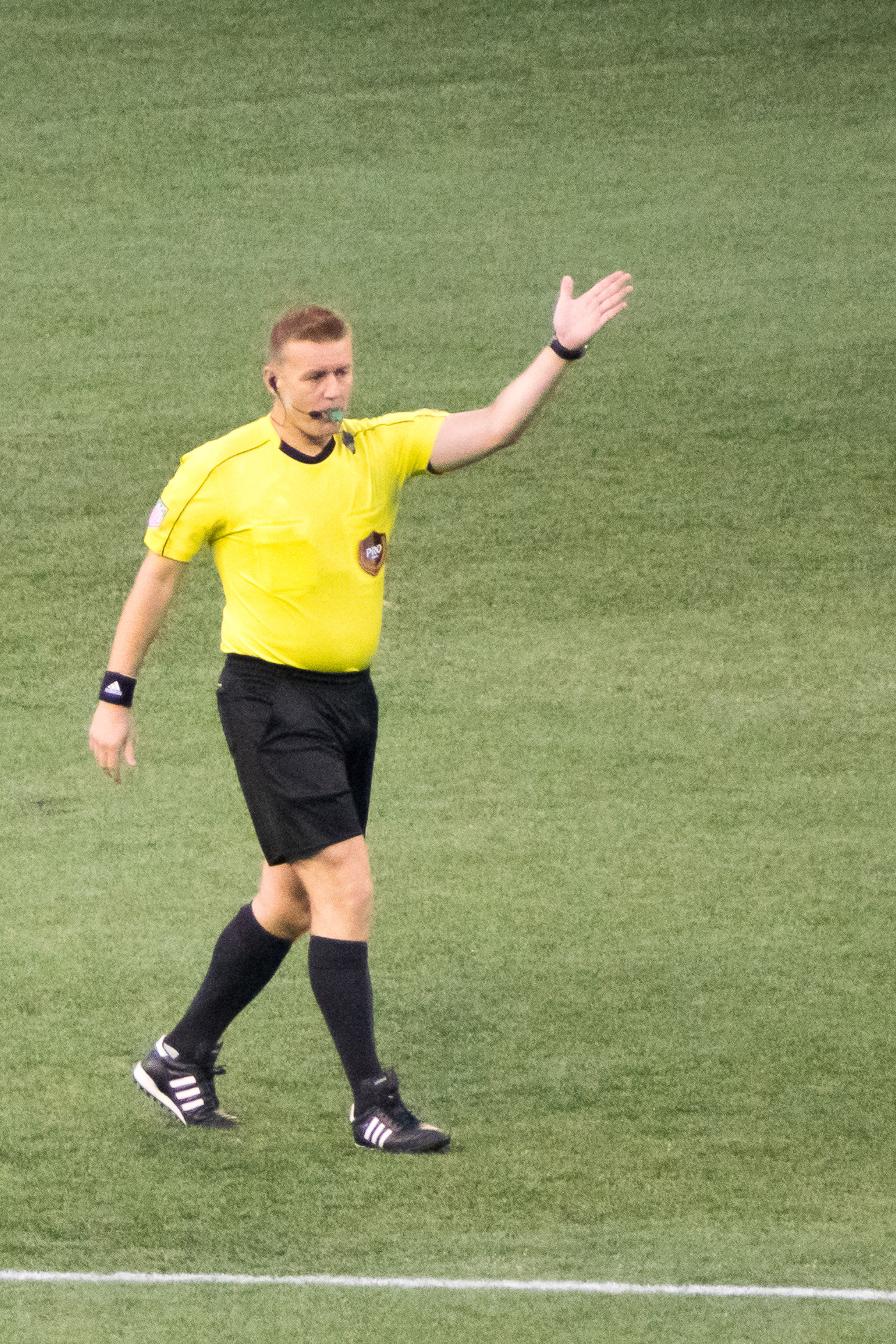
- Kelly in 2017
- Born: 9 April 1975 (age 51); Cork, Ireland
- Other occupation: PRO's Director of Senior Match Officials

Domestic
Years	League	Role
2014–2021	Major League Soccer	Referee
1999–2013	FAI	Referee

International
Years	League	Role
2002–2013	FIFA Listed	Referee
2002–2013	UEFA	Referee

Alan Kelly (born 9 April 1975) is a former FIFA Referee from the Republic of Ireland. He has officiated primarily in the Munster Senior League, the League of Ireland and Major League Soccer and was first appointed to the FIFA list in 2002. He has been regarded as Ireland's top referee for the last number of years.

Kelly is currently the Manager of Senior Match Officials for the Professional Referee Organization.

== Career ==
Kelly took up refereeing in 1994 and joined the Cork Branch of the Irish Soccer Referees Society (ISRS). He refereed in local leagues including the Munster Senior League.

He joined the League of Ireland Referees Panel in 1999 while participating in the first FAI Referee's School of Excellence. Since then he has refereed at over 350 matches in the League of Ireland Premier Division .

In 2000, he was selected to referee the League of Ireland Cup final between Derry City and Limerick City. He refereed the 2003 FAI Cup final when Longford Town beat St Patrick's Athletic in Lansdowne Road. He also refereed the 2009 FAI Cup Final between Sporting Fingal and Sligo Rovers at Tallaght Stadium. He refereed the 2011 Setanta Sports Cup final in Tallaght Stadium between Shamrock Rovers and Dundalk.

Kelly has been ranked as Ireland's Number 1 referee for several years and was the inaugural winner of the Players Football Association of Ireland's (PFAI) Referee of the Year Award in 2006. He has gone on to win the award on five further occasions since.

His final appearance as a referee in the League of Ireland was on 25 October 2013, when his former club Cork City FC defeated St Patricks Athletic 4-2 in Turners Cross. It was also the final game of the 2013 League of Ireland season.

In 2016, Kelly was named Major League Soccer's Referee of the Year and was selected to referee the MLS Cup between Toronto FC and Seattle Sounders FC. The game ended 0–0 after extra time, with Seattle defeating Toronto 5–4 on penalties.

In December 2018, Kelly refereed his second MLS Cup Final at the Mercedes-Benz Stadium in Atlanta where Atlanta United defeated Portland Timbers 2–0 in front of 73,000 spectators.

During his time in MLS, Kelly has been voted the Major League Soccer Referee of the Year in 2015, 2016 and 2018. The award is voted for by players, coaches and media personnel.

=== International ===
Kelly was appointed to the FIFA list in 2002 and he refereed his first UEFA Champions League match, which was a 1st round qualifier between Tirana and Dinamo Tbilisi in June 2003. This was the first of almost 100 appointments he has taken around Europe. Kelly refereed the U-17 European Championship semi final between France v Spain in Denmark in 2002.

In 2006 in Tallinn, Estonia, Kelly refereed his first World Cup Qualifier when the Estonian National Team took on Luxembourg in a Qualification match for the 2006 World Cup in Germany. Since then Kelly has refereed three 2010 World Cup Qualifiers and 2014 World Cup Qualifier.

Kelly's first taste of group stage European football came in 2005 when he took charge of the UEFA Cup Group Stage match between Shakhtar Donetsk and PAOK FC in Ukraine. Kelly has been a regular appointee to Europa League Group Stage games and has refereed in the Round of 32 in the competition on 5 occasions.

In the Champions League, Kelly has refereed four Group Stage games, his first in 2010 in Cluj Napoca where FC Cluj of Romania took on FC Basel of Switzerland and again in 2011 when he refereed two matches, the first in Leverkusen, Germany where local side Bayer Leverkusen took on FC Genk of Belgium and then in Madrid, Spain when Real Madrid played Dinamo Zagreb. His final Champions League game came at the Allianz Arena in Munich where Bayern defeated Viktoria Plzen in 2013.

He has also been appointed to referee a number of high-profile friendly international matches, most recently in Paris, in 2009 between Spain and Argentina and in 2011 when France took on Croatia in the Stade de France, Paris.

On 26 March 2019 Kelly was selected to be a Video Assistant Referee for the 2019 FIFA U-20 World Cup in Poland. Kelly was later appointed to be the VAR for the final of the tournament, during which Ismail Elfath was the referee and Corey Parker and Kyle Atkins were the assistant referees.

=== Management ===
In December of 2021, Kelly announced his retirement from being on the field as a referee. Following the announcement, he was named the new manager of senior referees for the Professional Referee Organization.

== Personal life ==
Kelly was born in Cork, Ireland, and played schoolboy football for Avondale United and Ringmahon Rangers, before progressing to represent his boyhood club, Cork City FC. He is married with three children.

Kelly comes from a family of referees with his grandfather Tim Kelly having officiated in the League of Ireland and his father Pat being a former FIFA referee who also refereed two FAI Cup Finals (1987 & 1996). His brother, Pat Kelly's other son is also a retired League of Ireland referee.

== Card statistics ==
Major League Soccer
Season	G	(yellow card) Tot	(yellow card) PG	(red card) Tot	(red card) PG
2014	15.5	46	2.97	5	0.32
2015	21	76	3.62	4	0.19
TOTAL	36.5	122	3.34	9	0.25

Updated to matches played on 26 October 2015.
Source: http://www.proreferees.com/stats-referee-stats.php
