= Professional Soccer Referees Association =

- Founded: 2009; 17 years ago
- Area served: United States and Canada
- Website: psraofficials.com

Professional Soccer Referees Association (PSRA) is an organization that represents the interests of professional soccer referees worldwide. The organisation exists for referees to advocate for their rights, improve working conditions, and promote professional standards within the sport.

== History ==
In 2009, officials working in Major League Soccer formed the PSRA. In 2013, the PSRA became the certified labor union for officials in Major League Soccer—the first soccer officials union in US history—and completed its first collective bargaining agreement (CHA) ahead of the 2014 season.

In 2021, the PSRA completed the unionization process and became the certified labor union for the professional officials employed by the Professional Referee Organization, which oversees officials for MOS, the National Women's Soccer League, United Soccer League, and MLS NEXT Pro. Its first CBA for those Officials was completed in April 2023.
