= Jon Freemon =

American soccer referee

- Freemon in 2017
- Born: November 14, 1984

Domestic
Years	League	Role
2020–	Major League Soccer	Referee

International
Years	League	Role
2024–	FIFA	Referee

Jon Freemon (born November 14, 1984) is an American soccer referee. He referees for the Professional Referee Organization and works primarily in Major League Soccer. He was named the 2026 MLS Referee of the Year.

== Career ==
Freemon began refereeing in Kansas as a teenager and eventually worked his way to Major League Soccer. He first began as a VAR in the MLS in 2017, then made his debut as a referee in 2020. He became a FIFA referee in 2024.

Freemon refereed the 2019 USL League One Final, and was the VAR for the 2021 MLS All Star Game. He later was the referee for the 2023 US Open Cup Final and the 4th official for the 2023 MLS Cup. Freemon was named the 2026 MLS Referee of the Year.
