= Allen Chapman =

American soccer referee

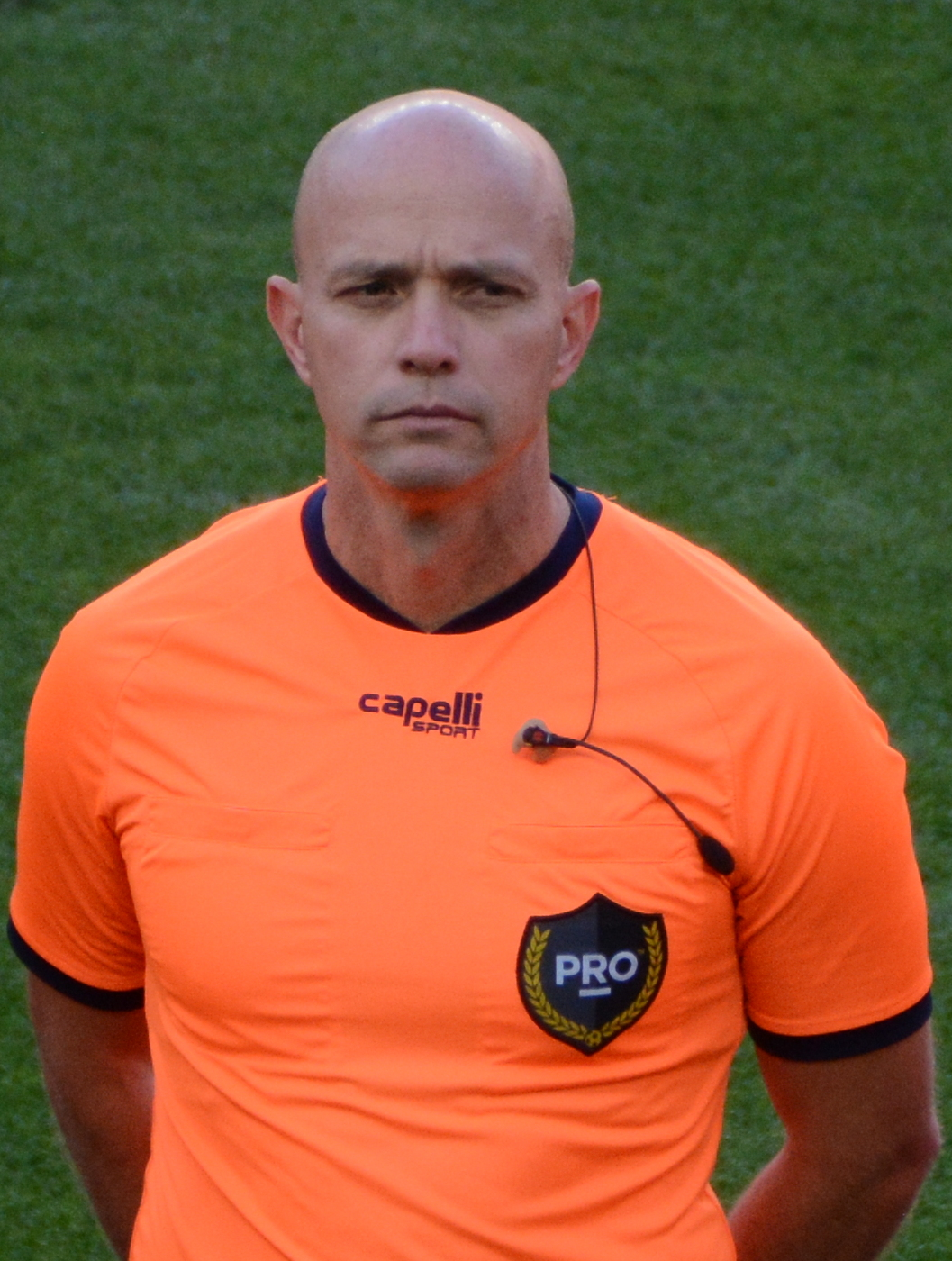
- Chapman in 2022
- Born: August 18, 1974 (age 52); United States

Domestic
Years	League	Role
2012–	Major League Soccer	Referee

International
Years	League	Role
2021-	FIFA	Video Match Official

Allen Chapman (born August 18, 1974) is an American soccer referee employed by PRO. He primarily officiates in Major League Soccer. He has also been a FIFA video match official since 2021.

== Career ==
=== Referee ===
Chapman was named MLS Referee of the Year in 2017 and 2019. He was the referee for MLS Cup 2017 and MLS Cup 2019. He was also the referee for the NASL Soccer Bowl in 2016, and for the US Open Cup final in 2019.

=== Video Assistant Referee ===
During an August 2016 USL match in New Jersey, Chapman became the first video assistant referee to be used during a professional match.

Chapman became a FIFA VAR in 2021. Chapman served as a video match official for the CONCACAF Gold Cup in 2021, 2023, and 2025.

Chapman was assigned as an AVAR for the Leagues Cup Final in 2025. He was also the VAR for the FIFA Intercontinental Final later that year.

Allen Chapman was appointed the VAR for the 2026 CONCACAF Champions Cup Final between Toluca FC and Tigres UNAL.

== Personal life ==
Chapman is also a former player and coach. He played professionally for the Arizona Sahuaros between 2000 and 2002. As of 2019, Chapman is a resident of Utah.

== Card statistics ==
Major League Soccer
Season	G	(yellow card) Tot	(yellow card) PG	(red card) Tot	(red card) PG
2013	23	69	3	4	0.17
2014	17	74	4.35	4	0.24
2015	21	81	3.86	5	0.24
2016	14	55	3.93	2	0.14
2017	22	79	3.59	5	0.23
2018	27	86	3.19	7	0.26
2019	27	109	4.04	10	0.37
2020	14	56	4	3	0.21
2021	20	83	4.15	3	0.15

Updated to matches played on November 29, 2021.
Source: http://proreferees.com/stats/referee-stats/
