= Chris Penso =

American soccer referee (born 1982)

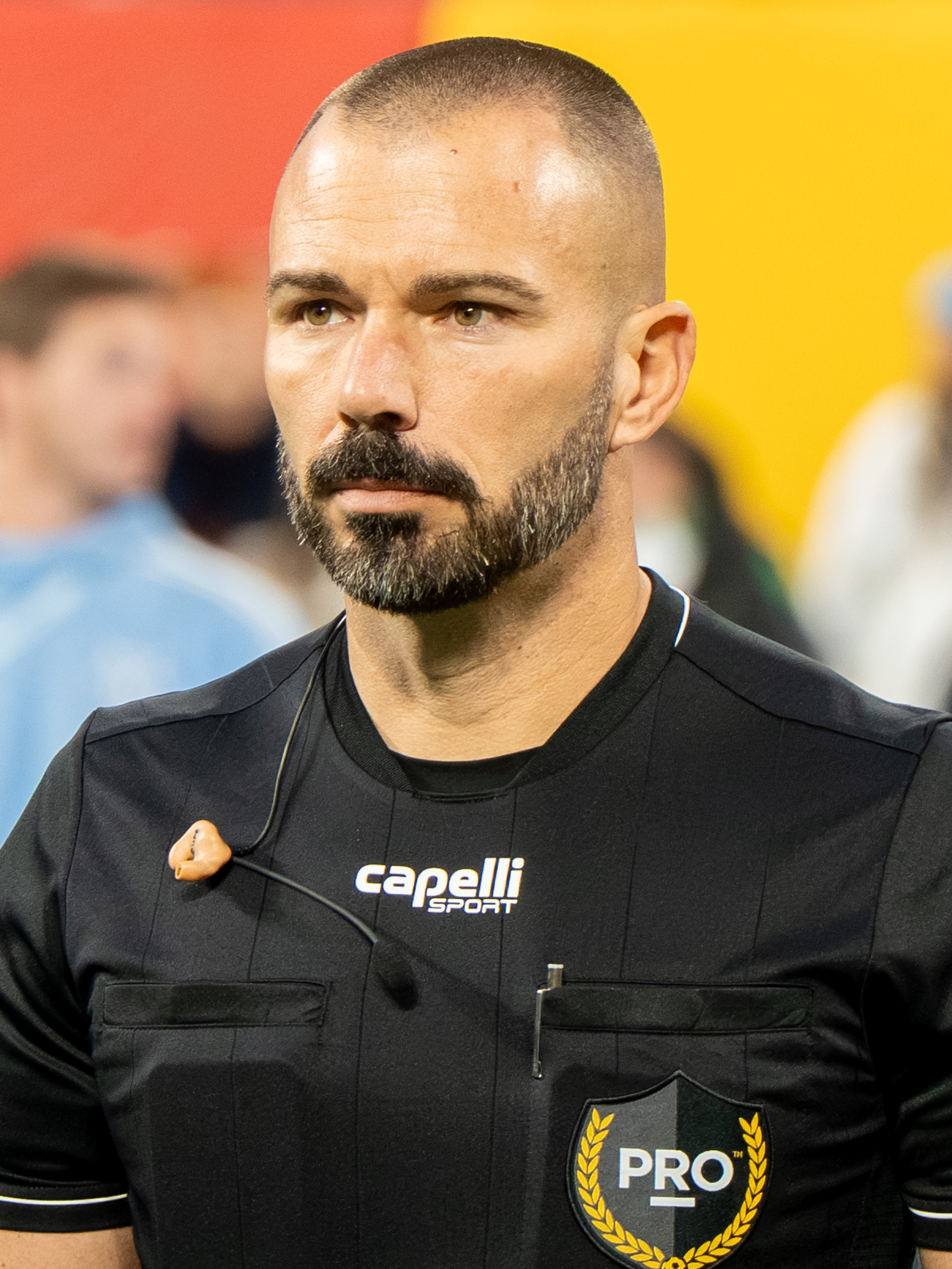
- Penso in 2025
- Born: April 28, 1982 (age 44); Dover, Ohio, U.S.
- Other occupation: College Coordinator of Officials

Domestic
Years	League	Role
2011–	Major League Soccer	Referee

International
Years	League	Role
2013–2015	FIFA listed	Referee
2021–	FIFA listed	VAR

Chris Penso (born April 28, 1982) is an American soccer referee who is active in Major League Soccer.

== Career ==
Penso was raised in Dover, Ohio, and unsuccessfully ran for mayor of the city while studying accounting at Kent State University. He began refereeing in 1997, and also worked at the Transportation Security Administration and the Ohio State Highway Patrol. He quit the state patrol in 2006 to become a full-time referee, and officiated his first Major League Soccer match in 2011.

Penso became FIFA listed in 2013 and his first international assignment was on January 30, 2013, when he refereed a match between Mexico and Denmark. He served as a FIFA referee until 2015. In 2021, Penso was added to the FIFA list as a VAR.

Penso was the VAR for the MLS Cup in 2018 and 2021, and was the 4th official in 2015. He was selected as the referee for the 2016 MLS All Star Game.

In 2021, Penso was selected as a VAR for the Tokyo Olympics. He was the VAR for both the men's and women's gold medal matches.

Penso was assigned as the AVAR for the 2026 CONCACAF Champions Cup Final between Toluca FC and Tigres UANL.

== Internationals ==
Date	Location	Teams	Scoreline	Competition	Yellow card	(yellow card) (red card)	Red card
January 30, 2013	Phoenix	Mexico – Denmark League XI	1 – 1	Friendly	3	0	0
May 28, 2013	Edmonton	Canada – Costa Rica	0 – 1	Friendly	2	0	2
October 31, 2013	San Diego	Mexico – Finland	4 – 2	Friendly	1	0	0
June 3, 2014	Tampa	Costa Rica – Japan	1 – 3	Friendly	3	0	0
September 9, 2014	Commerce City	Bolivia – Mexico	0 – 1	Friendly	2	0	1
November 19, 2014	Panama City	Panama – Canada	0 – 0	Friendly	3	1	0
May 31, 2015	Washington D.C.	Honduras – El Salvador	2 – 0	Friendly	4	0	1
September 8, 2015	Harrison	Colombia – Peru	1 – 1	Friendly	5	0	0
October 14, 2015	Washington D.C.	Canada – Ghana	1 – 1	Friendly	3	0	0

== Personal life ==
Penso's wife, Tori, is also a professional referee. In 2020, she became the first woman to referee a Major League Soccer match in 20 years. She also refereed the 2023 FIFA Women's World Cup final. They have three daughters.
