= Kathryn Nesbitt =

American soccer referee (born 1988)

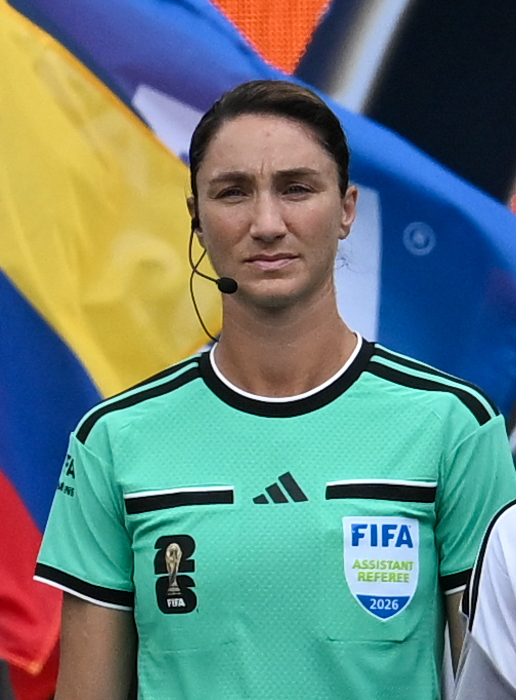
- Nesbitt at the 2026 FIFA World Cup
- Born: November 7, 1988 (age 37); Rochester, New York, U.S.
- Other occupation: Analytical Chemist

Domestic
Years	League	Role
2013–present	NWSL	Assistant Referee
2015–present	MLS	Assistant Referee

International
Years	League	Role
2016–present	FIFA	Assistant Referee
2022–present	FIFA	Video Assistant Referee

Kathryn Nesbitt (born November 7, 1988) is an American soccer assistant referee who has been on the FIFA International Referees List since 2016 and, since 2022, as a video assistant referee. She has worked three FIFA World Cups, and became the first woman to officiate a men's World Cup knockout round in 2022.

== Career ==
Nesbitt was born in Rochester, New York, in November 1988, later moving to Philadelphia, Pennsylvania. She is an analytical chemist, graduating from St. John Fisher University and subsequently from the University of Pittsburgh. Nesbitt also taught at Towson University before resigning to pursue a professional career in refereeing in 2019 in the weeks leading up to the 2019 FIFA Women's World Cup.

Nesbitt took part in her first professional match in April 2013 in an NWSL game. As an assistant referee, she has officiated several friendlies and other matches at international tournaments, including at the 2021 CONCACAF Gold Cup and the 2022 CONCACAF W Championship. In American soccer, Nesbitt also oversaw the MLS is Back Tournament final, the 2020 MLS Cup, and was named MLS's Best Assistant Referee that same year.

In November–December 2022, Nesbitt served as an assistant referee at that year's FIFA World Cup in Qatar, making history by becoming the first female referee to officiate in a men's knockout stage game of the tournament. She was also appointed as a reserve assistant referee at the final match between Argentina and France.

In January 2023, Nesbitt was selected for the 2023 FIFA Women's World Cup in Australia and New Zealand. On August 20, 2023, Nesbitt, along with pitch referee Tori Penso and fellow assistant referee Brooke Mayo, became the first American refereeing team to officiate a World Cup final; the match was played between Spain and England.

Nesbitt was appointed in April 2026 to the 2026 FIFA World Cup as an assistant referee of the American representatives, which as in the 2023 FIFA Women's World Cup, was led by Penso and with assistant referee Mayo. This made them the first all-female and all-American crew of officials at any men's FIFA World Cup.

FIFA World Cup Finals
Tournament	Matchup	Venue	Role
2022 FIFA World Cup final	Argentina vs France	Lusail Stadium	Reserve assistant referee
2023 FIFA Women's World Cup final	Spain vs England	Stadium Australia	Assistant referee

== Personal life ==
Nesbitt was a figure skater during her school years and played volleyball while in college. Upon her appointment to the 2026 FIFA World Cup, former English referee Howard Webb, who officiated in the 2010 FIFA World Cup final, praised Nesbitt for her physical status and temperament skills when on the pitch and while processing information quickly.
