= Joe Dickerson =

American soccer referee

Joseph Dickerson
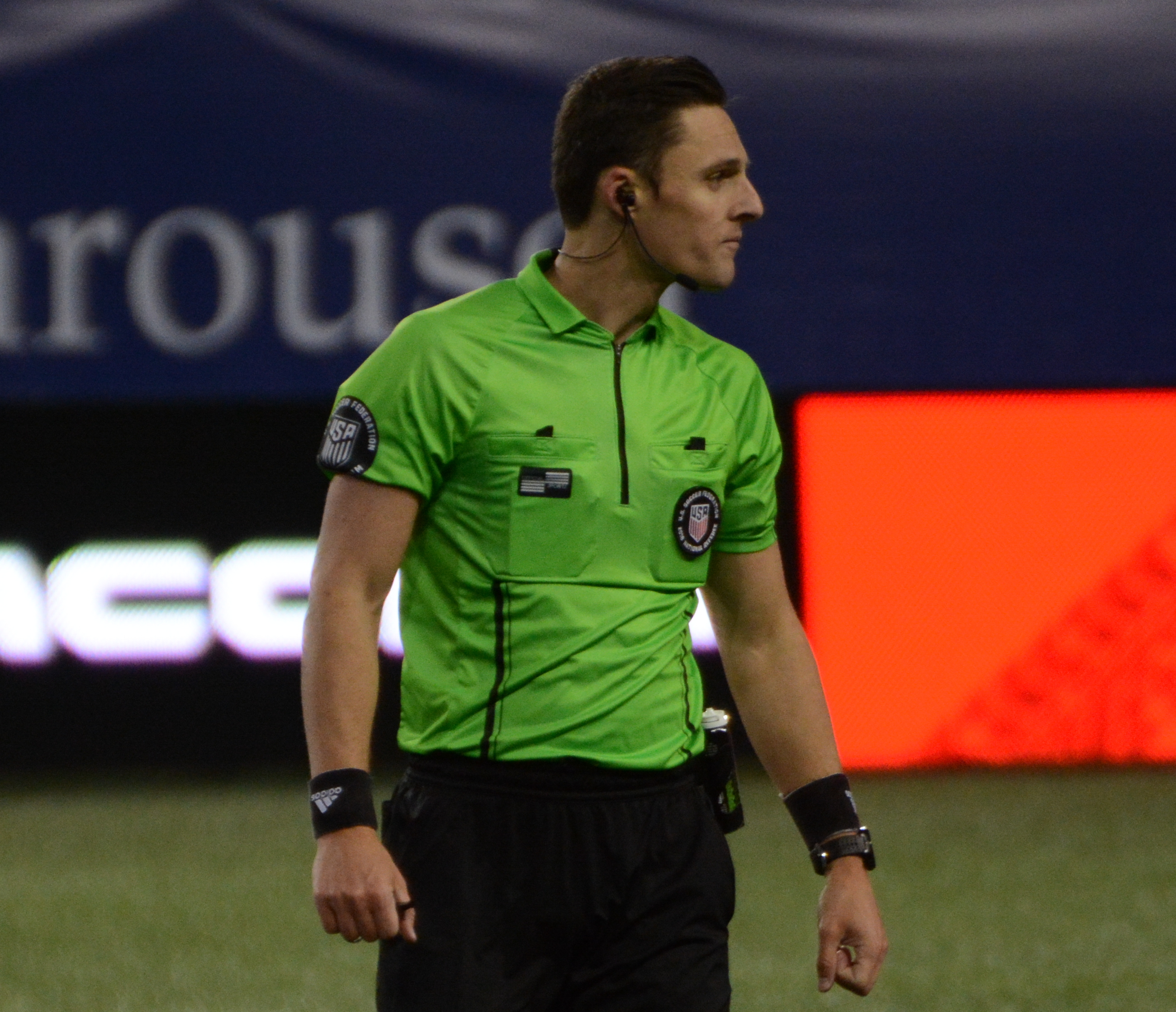
- Dickerson in 2018
- Born: 1987 or 1988 (age 38–39); California, U.S.

Domestic
Years	League	Role
2017–	Major League Soccer	Referee

International
Years	League	Role
2023–	FIFA	Referee
2023–	FIFA	VAR

Joseph "Joe" Dickerson (born 1987 or 1988) is an American soccer referee who officiates in the Major League Soccer since 2017 and as an international FIFA referee since 2023. He was selected as a VAR to the 2026 FIFA World Cup.

== Biography and career ==
Dickerson is a native and a resident of Northern California, and he is also a graduate from the University of California, Davis, where he obtained various degrees in Exercise Biology and Communications. As of 2026, Dickerson is a Master of Liberal Arts student at the University of Chicago.

Dickerson is fluent in Spanish, in addition to his native English, and has practiced many sports, including soccer, baseball, cross-country, rowing and cycling.

=== Domestic ===
He became a professional soccer referee in January 2013, and was listed in the Major League Soccer in October 2017, officiating his first match between Philadelphia Union vs. Orlando City. In the first seven years of his professional career inside the MLS, Dickerson has refereed at least 114 matches.

In August 2023, Dickerson refereed the U.S. Open Cup semifinal match between FC Cincinnati and Inter Miami at the TQL Stadium in Ohio.

In 2025, after a MLS game between Inter Miami and Orlando City, Dickerson had a verbal confrontation with Argentine footballer Lionel Messi, who questioned and disapproved of his refereeing. Dickerson warned Messi with a second yellow card and told him to "walk away."

He was named 2025 US Soccer Male Referee of the Year.

=== International ===
In June 2023, Dickerson received the FIFA International badge, taking charge of his first international match in the Gold Cup First Round game between Suriname and Puerto Rico. His second match on the international stage was a friendly game between Mexico and Ghana in Charlotte, North Carolina, and his third one was another friendly between the USMNT and Ghana in Nashville.

Dickerson later served as a VAR official at the 2023 FIFA U-17 World Cup in Indonesia, as well as in the CONCACAF Nations League and the CONCACAF qualification matches for the 2026 FIFA World Cup.

Dickerson also refereed in the 2025 CONCACAF Gold Cup, leading a chaotic game between El Salvador and Canada, where he showed a straight red card to a Salvadoran player in the Canadians' victory 2-0.

In October 2025, Dickerson was appointed to the FIFA U-20 World Cup in Chile, where he officiated both as a match referee and a VAR official. He was assigned as the fourth official for the final between Argentina and Morocco.

Dickerson was selected as a VAR for the 2026 FIFA World Cup in North America. He was one of eight American officials selected for the tournament. He received 12 assignments including the standby AVAR for the semifinal match.
