= Record attendances in United States club soccer =

Competitive men's professional soccer has been played in the United States since 1912 and since 2001 for women's. Numerous leagues have existed over the years with some recognized by the United States Soccer Federation and some not. The lists below are the single game attendance records for men's outdoor (60,000+), women's outdoor (20,000+), and men's indoor (18,000+) matches in American club soccer.

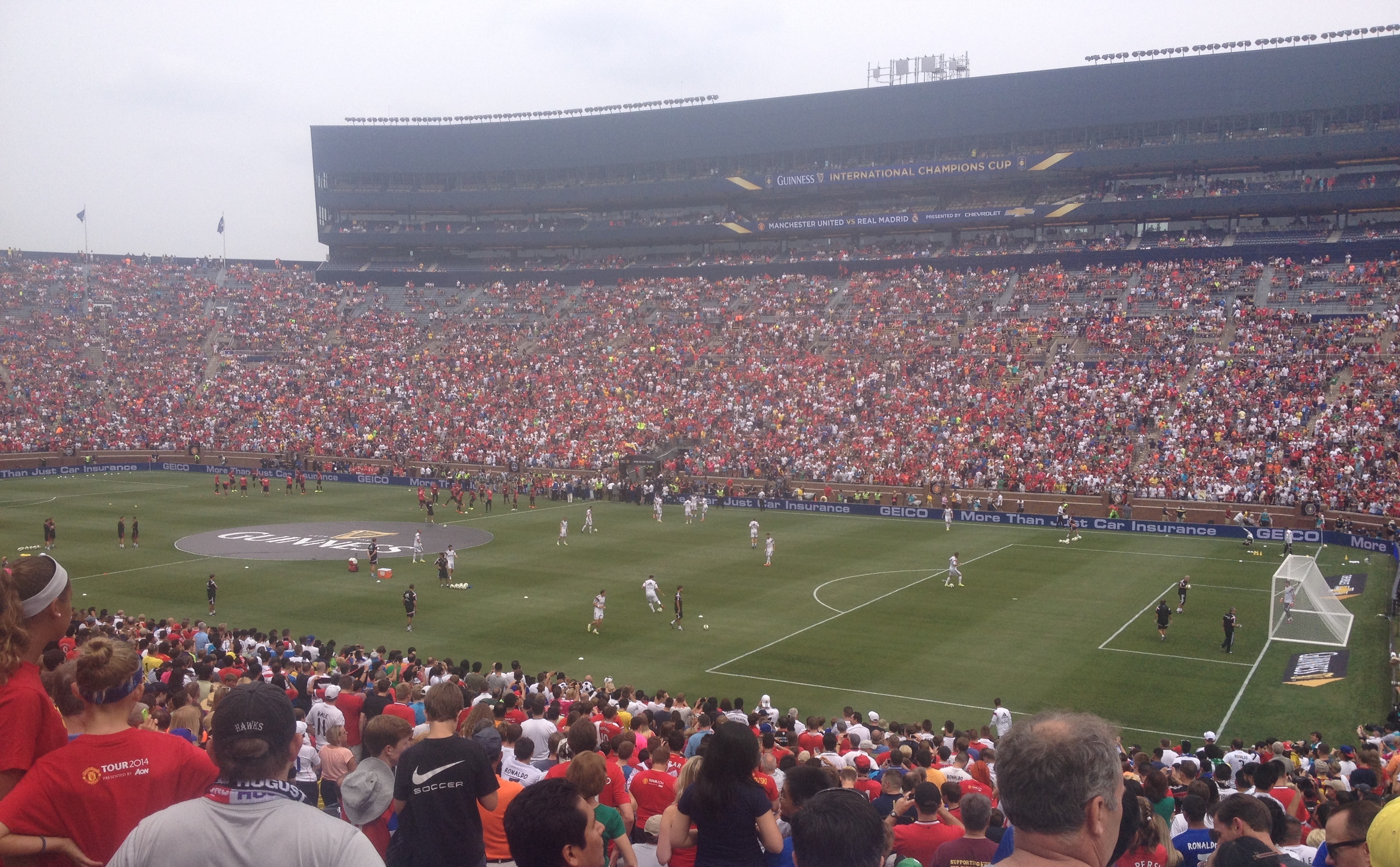
Michigan Stadium during Real Madrid vs. Manchester United friendly game which set a record for most fans to watch a soccer game in the United States, August 2, 2014

== Men's soccer ==
=== MLS attendance ===
This list includes matches in which at least one Major League Soccer team has participated. This list does not include several matches played in the U.S. between two clubs not based in the United States (e.g. Chelsea vs. AC Milan in the 2009 World Football Challenge).

Rank	Year	Attendance	Teams	Competition	Venue & Location
1	2015	93,226	Barcelona at LA Galaxy	2015 ICC	Rose Bowl, Pasadena, California
2	2009	93,137	Barcelona at LA Galaxy	Friendly	Rose Bowl, Pasadena, California
3	2010	89,134	Real Madrid at LA Galaxy	Friendly	Rose Bowl, Pasadena, California
4	2014	86,432	Manchester United at LA Galaxy	Friendly	Rose Bowl, Pasadena, California
5	2023	82,110	Los Angeles FC at LA Galaxy	MLS	Rose Bowl, Pasadena, California
6	2026	75,824	Inter Miami CF at Colorado Rapids	MLS	Empower Field at Mile High
7	2026	75,673	Inter Miami CF at Los Angeles FC	MLS	Los Angeles Memorial Coliseum, Los Angeles, California
8	2022	74,479	LA Galaxy at Charlotte FC (club inaugural home match)	MLS	Bank of America Stadium, Charlotte, North Carolina
9	2018	73,019	Portland Timbers at Atlanta United FC	MLS Cup 2018	Mercedes-Benz Stadium, Atlanta, Georgia
10	2024	72,610	Inter Miami CF at Sporting Kansas City	MLS	Arrowhead Stadium, Kansas City, Missouri
11	2019	72,548	LA Galaxy at Atlanta United FC	MLS	Mercedes-Benz Stadium, Atlanta, Georgia
12	2018	72,317	Juventus at MLS All-Stars	All-Star Game	Mercedes-Benz Stadium, Atlanta, Georgia
13	2018	72,243	Seattle Sounders FC at Atlanta United FC	MLS	Mercedes-Benz Stadium, Atlanta, Georgia
14	2018	72,035	D.C. United at Atlanta United FC	MLS	Mercedes-Benz Stadium, Atlanta, Georgia
15	2018	72,017	Real Salt Lake at Atlanta United FC	MLS	Mercedes-Benz Stadium, Atlanta, Georgia
16	2018	71,932	Orlando City SC at Atlanta United FC	MLS	Mercedes-Benz Stadium, Atlanta, Georgia
17	2017	71,874	Toronto FC at Atlanta United FC	MLS	Mercedes-Benz Stadium, Atlanta, Georgia
18	2018	71,812	Chicago Fire FC at Atlanta United FC	MLS	Mercedes-Benz Stadium, Atlanta, Georgia
19	2023	71,635	Inter Miami CF at Atlanta United FC	MLS	Mercedes-Benz Stadium, Atlanta, Georgia
20	2010	70,728	Manchester United at MLS All-Stars	All-Star Game	Reliant Stadium, Houston, Texas
21	2018	70,526	New York City FC at Atlanta United FC	MLS Playoffs	Mercedes-Benz Stadium, Atlanta, Georgia
22	2017	70,425	Orlando City SC at Atlanta United FC	MLS	Mercedes-Benz Stadium, Atlanta, Georgia
23	2019	70,382	FC Cincinnati at Atlanta United FC	MLS	Mercedes-Benz Stadium, Atlanta, Georgia
24	2024	70,076	Los Angeles FC at LA Galaxy	MLS	Rose Bowl, Pasadena, California
25	2018	70,016	New York Red Bulls at Atlanta United FC	MLS Playoffs	Mercedes-Benz Stadium, Atlanta, Georgia

==== International doubleheaders ====
The following are MLS league matches that were part of a double-header involving international or foreign teams.

Rank	Year	Attendance	Teams	Competition	Venue & location
1	2006	92,516	New England Revolution at Chivas USA	MLS	Los Angeles Memorial Coliseum, Los Angeles, California
2	1996	92,216	Tampa Bay Mutiny at LA Galaxy	MLS	Rose Bowl, Pasadena, California
3	2005	88,816	LA Galaxy at Chivas USA	MLS	Los Angeles Memorial Coliseum, Los Angeles, California
4	1996	78,416	MLS East vs. MLS West	MLS All-Star Game	Giants Stadium, East Rutherford, New Jersey
5	1999	73,123	D.C. United at San Jose Clash	MLS	Stanford Stadium, Stanford, California
6	2022	71,189	Chivas de Guadalajara at LA Galaxy	Leagues Cup	SoFi Stadium, Inglewood, California
6	2022	71,189	América at Los Angeles FC	Leagues Cup	SoFi Stadium, Inglewood, California
8	2006	70,550	LA Galaxy at Houston Dynamo	MLS	Reliant Stadium, Houston, Texas
9	2009	61,572	Columbus Crew at San Jose Earthquakes	MLS	Candlestick Park, San Francisco, California

=== NASL attendance ===
This list includes matches in which at least one team from the North American Soccer League (1968–84) has participated.

Rank	Year	Attendance	Teams	Competition	Venue & location
1	1977	77,691	Ft. Lauderdale Strikers at Cosmos	NASL playoffs	Giants Stadium, East Rutherford, New Jersey
2	1979	76,031	Tulsa Roughnecks at New York Cosmos	NASL playoffs	Giants Stadium, East Rutherford, New Jersey
3	1977	75,646	Santos FC at Cosmos (Pelé farewell, 10/1/77)	friendly	Giants Stadium, East Rutherford, New Jersey
4	1978	74,901	Cosmos vs. Tampa Bay Rowdies	NASL Soccer Bowl	Giants Stadium, East Rutherford, New Jersey
5	1977	73,669	Rochester Lancers at Cosmos	NASL playoffs	Giants Stadium, East Rutherford, New Jersey
6	1979	72,342	Ft. Lauderdale Strikers at New York Cosmos	NASL	Giants Stadium, East Rutherford, New Jersey
7	1980	71,413	NASL Select at New York Cosmos	friendly	Giants Stadium, East Rutherford, New Jersey
8	1978	71,219	Seattle Sounders at Cosmos	NASL	Giants Stadium, East Rutherford, New Jersey
9	1980	70,312	Ft. Lauderdale Strikers at New York Cosmos	NASL	Giants Stadium, East Rutherford, New Jersey
10	1979	70,134	Argentina at New York Cosmos (6/6/79)	friendly	Giants Stadium, East Rutherford, New Jersey
11	1979	70,042	Tampa Bay Rowdies at New York Cosmos (8/8/79)	NASL	Giants Stadium, East Rutherford, New Jersey
12	1978	65,287	Portland Timbers at Cosmos	NASL playoffs	Giants Stadium, East Rutherford, New Jersey
13	1978	62,497	New England Tea Men at Cosmos	NASL	Giants Stadium, East Rutherford, New Jersey
14	1977	62,394	Tampa Bay Rowdies at Cosmos	NASL	Giants Stadium, East Rutherford, New Jersey
15	1980	60,384	Vancouver Whitecaps at New York Cosmos	Trans-Atlantic Challenge	Giants Stadium, East Rutherford, New Jersey
16	1978	60,199	Minnesota Kicks at Cosmos	NASL playoffs	Giants Stadium, East Rutherford, New Jersey
17	1980	60,182	Seattle Sounders at New York Cosmos	NASL	Giants Stadium, East Rutherford, New Jersey
18	1978	60,032	Tampa Bay Rowdies at Cosmos	NASL	Giants Stadium, East Rutherford, New Jersey

*Cosmos dropped "New York" from name in 1977 and 1978 seasons

=== Indoor soccer ===
This list refers to indoor soccer matches, not to regulation soccer matches played in indoor stadiums. Nearly all of the most attended indoor matches occurred during the 1980s in the Major Indoor Soccer League. The majority of these were hosted by the St. Louis Steamers during the early 1980s, or by the Cleveland Force during the mid 1980s.

Rank	Year	Attendance	Teams	Competition	Venue & Location
1	1987	21,728	Dallas Sidekicks at Tacoma Stars	MISL Championship	Tacoma Dome, Tacoma, Washington
2	1987	20,284	Dallas Sidekicks at Tacoma Stars	MISL Championship	Tacoma Dome, Tacoma, Washington
3	1986	20,174	Minnesota Strikers at Cleveland Force	MISL	Richfield Coliseum, Richfield, Ohio
4	1986	19,476	San Diego Sockers at St. Louis Steamers	MISL playoffs	St. Louis Arena, St. Louis, Missouri
5	1986	19,468	Baltimore Blast at Cleveland Force	MISL	Richfield Coliseum, Richfield, Ohio
6	1982	19,398	Tampa Bay Rowdies at Chicago Sting	NASL	Chicago Stadium, Chicago, Illinois
7	1984	19,360	New York Arrows at Cleveland Force	MISL	Richfield Coliseum, Richfield, Ohio
8	1981	19,298	Denver Avalanche at St. Louis Steamers	MISL	Checkerdome, St. Louis, Missouri
9	1980	19,229	Philadelphia Fever at St. Louis Steamers	MISL	Checkerdome, St. Louis, Missouri
10	1981	19,112	Philadelphia Fever at St. Louis Steamers	MISL	Checkerdome, St. Louis, Missouri
11	1980	19,108	Detroit Lightning at St. Louis Steamers	MISL	Checkerdome, St. Louis, Missouri
12	1983	19,106	Chicago Sting at Cleveland Force	MISL playoffs	Richfield Coliseum, Richfield, Ohio
13	1984	19,048	Pittsburgh Spirit at Cleveland Force	MISL	Richfield Coliseum, Richfield, Ohio
14	1983	18,881	Wichita Wings at St. Louis Steamers	MISL	Checkerdome, St. Louis, Missouri
15	1986	18,797	Minnesota Strikers at Cleveland Force	MISL playoffs	Richfield Coliseum, Richfield, Ohio
16	1987	18,674	San Diego Sockers at Cleveland Force	MISL	Richfield Coliseum, Richfield, Ohio
17	1984	18,630	Pittsburgh Spirit at Cleveland Force	MISL playoffs	Richfield Coliseum, Richfield, Ohio
18	1984	18,627	Baltimore Blast at Cleveland Force	MISL	Richfield Coliseum, Richfield, Ohio

== Women's soccer ==
=== WUSA, WPS, NWSL attendance ===
These lists include the top-attended league matches from WUSA (2001–2003), WPS (2009–2011), and NWSL (2013–present), split into standalone matches and matches that were doubleheaders with MLS teams.

==== Standalone matches ====
The Denver Summit of the NWSL set the standalone club match attendance record across all United States women's leagues of 63,004 spectators during their inaugural home opener at Empower Field against Washington Spirit on March 28, 2026.

Portland Thorns FC held the top six NWSL attendance records until the debut home game of the Orlando Pride in 2016, which set the new NWSL record; that record was eclipsed by the Thorns in 2019 and still later by San Diego Wave FC in its debut at the new Snapdragon Stadium in 2022. The Thorns consistently draw over 14,000 fans and averaged slightly over 20,000 in the 2019 season, the last before COVID-19 effects; until that season they were the only NWSL team to have drawn over 10,000 fans more than thrice. Continued strong numbers from Utah Royals FC and a club-record post-World Cup standalone match from the Chicago Red Stars pushed both clubs to their fourth 10,000-plus attendances.

The 2022 NWSL season, the first season since 2019 that was relatively unaffected by COVID-19, not only saw a new league single-game attendance record, but was also marked by very strong attendance for the debuting Angel City FC, which sold out its stadium four times in its first regular season with an average attendance of 19,104 spectators per game. Angel City was also Wave FC's opponent for the latter side's record-setting game.

In 2023, the NWSL broke its single-match record once again at Lumen Field in Seattle, Washington, when OL Reign hosted the Washington Spirit before 34,130 spectators for the team's regular-season finale and final regular-season home match of retiring player Megan Rapinoe.

During the 2024 NWSL season, the Chicago Red Stars set a new standalone club match attendance record of 35,038 at Wrigley Field against Bay FC on June 8, 2024.

The 2025 NWSL season saw Bay FC set the next standalone club match attendance record of 40,091 at Oracle Park against Washington Spirit on August 23, 2025. This record was broken the following season during the Denver Summit's inaugural home opener against the Washington Spirit.

Rank	Year	Attendance	Teams	Competition	Venue, location
1	2026	63,004	Washington Spirit at Denver Summit (inaugural home opener)	NWSL	Empower Field, Denver, Colorado
2	2026	42,175	Washington Spirit at Gotham FC	NWSL	Citi Field, New York City
3	2025	40,091	Washington Spirit at Bay FC	NWSL	Oracle Park, San Francisco, California
4	2024	35,038	Bay FC at Chicago Red Stars	NWSL	Wrigley Field, Chicago, Illinois
5	2001	34,148	Bay Area CyberRays at Washington Freedom (league inaugural match)	WUSA	RFK Stadium, Washington, D.C.
6	2023	34,130	Washington Spirit at OL Reign	NWSL	Lumen Field, Seattle, Washington
7	2023	32,262	OL Reign at San Diego Wave FC	NWSL Playoff	Snapdragon Stadium, San Diego, California
8	2024	32,066	Kansas City Current at San Diego Wave FC (season opener)	NWSL	Snapdragon Stadium, San Diego, California
9	2022	32,000	Angel City FC at San Diego Wave FC (opening match at new stadium) (Note: Wave FC opened its inaugural season in 2022 at another San Diego venue, Torero Stadium. That venue seats only 6,000, compared to the 32,000 of Snapdragon Stadium in its soccer configuration.)	NWSL	Snapdragon Stadium, San Diego, California
10	2023	30,854	Chicago Red Stars at San Diego Wave FC (season opener)	NWSL	Snapdragon Stadium, San Diego, California
11	2023	30,312	Racing Louisville FC at San Diego Wave FC	NWSL	Snapdragon Stadium, San Diego, California
12	2001	30,271	Carolina Courage at Washington Freedom	WUSA	RFK Stadium, Washington, D.C.
13	2026	30,207	Gotham FC at Boston Legacy (club inaugural match)	NWSL	Gillette Stadium, Foxborough, Massachusetts
14	2024	26,516	North Carolina Courage at San Diego Wave FC	NWSL Playoff	Snapdragon Stadium, San Diego, California
15	2022	26,215	Chicago Red Stars at San Diego Wave FC	NWSL Playoff	Snapdragon Stadium, San Diego, California
16	2023	25,515	Angel City FC at San Diego Wave FC	NWSL	Snapdragon Stadium, San Diego, California
17	2019	25,218	North Carolina Courage at Portland Thorns FC	NWSL	Providence Park, Portland, Oregon
17	2023	25,218	OL Reign at Portland Thorns FC	NWSL	Providence Park, Portland, Oregon
17	2023	25,218	Gotham FC at Portland Thorns FC	NWSL Playoff	Providence Park, Portland, Oregon
20	2023	25,111	Gotham FC vs. OL Reign	NWSL Championship Final	Snapdragon Stadium, San Diego, California
21	2023	24,936	Houston Dash at San Diego Wave FC	NWSL	Snapdragon Stadium, San Diego, California
22	2019	24,521	Washington Spirit at Portland Thorns FC	NWSL	Providence Park, Portland, Oregon
23	2024	24,115	Chicago Red Stars at San Diego Wave FC	NWSL	Snapdragon Stadium, San Diego, California
24	2024	23,541	Washington Spirit at San Diego Wave FC	NWSL	Snapdragon Stadium, San Diego, California
25	2016	23,403	Houston Dash at Orlando Pride (club inaugural match)	NWSL	Citrus Bowl, Orlando, Florida
26	2024	23,212	Angel City FC at Portland Thorns FC	NWSL	Providence Park, Portland, Oregon
27	2023	22,682	OL Reign at San Diego Wave FC	NWSL	Snapdragon Stadium, San Diego, California
28	2019	22,329	Houston Dash at Portland Thorns FC	NWSL	Providence Park, Portland, Oregon
29	2023	22,107	North Carolina Courage at Portland Thorns FC	NWSL	Providence Park, Portland, Oregon
30	2022	22,035	San Diego Wave FC at Portland Thorns FC	NWSL Playoff	Providence Park, Portland, Oregon
31	2022	22,000	North Carolina Courage at Angel City FC (club's inaugural regular-season match) (Note: In 2021 and 2022, the NWSL opened its season with the NWSL Challenge Cup, a completely separate competition from the regular league season.)	NWSL	Banc of California Stadium, Los Angeles, California
31	2022	22,000	San Diego Wave FC at Angel City FC	NWSL	Banc of California Stadium, Los Angeles, California
31	2022	22,000	OL Reign at Angel City FC	NWSL	Banc of California Stadium, Los Angeles, California
31	2022	22,000	Racing Louisville FC at Angel City FC	NWSL	Banc of California Stadium, Los Angeles, California
31	2023	22,000	Gotham FC at Angel City FC	NWSL	BMO Stadium, Los Angeles, California
31	2023	22,000	San Diego Wave FC at Angel City FC	NWSL	BMO Stadium, Los Angeles, California
31	2023	22,000	Houston Dash at Angel City FC	NWSL	BMO Stadium, Los Angeles, California
31	2023	22,000	OL Reign at Angel City FC	NWSL	BMO Stadium, Los Angeles, California
31	2023	22,000	Portland Thorns FC at Angel City FC	NWSL	BMO Stadium, Los Angeles, California
31	2024	22,000	Bay FC at Angel City FC	NWSL	BMO Stadium, Los Angeles, California
31	2024	22,000	North Carolina Courage at Angel City FC	NWSL	BMO Stadium, Los Angeles, California
31	2024	22,000	Orlando Pride at Angel City FC	NWSL	BMO Stadium, Los Angeles, California
31	2024	22,000	Portland Thorns FC at Angel City FC	NWSL	BMO Stadium, Los Angeles, California

==== MLS doubleheaders ====
WUSA attendances:

WUSA doubleheader listing:

Rank	Year	Attendance	Teams	Competition	Venue, location
1	2023	42,054	Portland Thorns at OL Reign	NWSL	Lumen Field, Seattle, Washington
2	2001	30,271	Carolina Courage at Washington Freedom	WUSA	RFK Stadium, Washington, D.C.
3	2021	27,278	Portland Thorns FC at OL Reign	NWSL	Lumen Field, Seattle, Washington
4	2002	24,240	San Diego Spirit at Washington Freedom	WUSA	RFK Stadium, Washington, D.C.
5	2022	23,951	San Diego Wave FC at Chicago Red Stars	NWSL	Soldier Field, Chicago, Illinois
6	2003	21,892	New York Power at Washington Freedom	WUSA	RFK Stadium, Washington, D.C.
7	2003	21,859	Carolina Courage at Washington Freedom	WUSA	RFK Stadium, Washington, D.C.
8	2001	21,682	Boston Breakers at Washington Freedom	WUSA	RFK Stadium, Washington, D.C.
9	2002	21,539	Washington Freedom at Boston Breakers	WUSA	CMGI Stadium, Foxborough, Massachusetts
10	2002	20,105	Carolina Courage at Washington Freedom	WUSA	RFK Stadium, Washington, D.C.

== Foreign clubs attendance ==
The following table shows record attendances for club soccer matches played in the U.S. where neither team was from a U.S. based league.

Year	Attendance	Teams	Competition	Venue & Location	Ref.
2014	109,318	Manchester United vs. Real Madrid	2014 ICC	Michigan Stadium, Ann Arbor, Michigan	
2016	105,826	Chelsea vs. Real Madrid	2016 ICC	Michigan Stadium, Ann Arbor, Michigan	
2018	101,254	Liverpool vs. Manchester United	2018 ICC	Michigan Stadium, Ann Arbor, Michigan	
2022	93,702	Real Madrid vs. Juventus	Soccer Champions Tour	Rose Bowl, Pasadena, California	
2017	93,098	Manchester City vs. Real Madrid	2017 ICC	Los Angeles Memorial Coliseum, Los Angeles, California	
2006	92,650	Chivas de Guadalajara vs. Barcelona		Los Angeles Memorial Coliseum, Los Angeles, California	
2016	86,641	Real Madrid vs. Paris Saint-Germain	2016 ICC	Ohio Stadium, Columbus, Ohio	
2023	83,164	Chivas de Guadalajara vs. Club América	Friendly (El Súper Clásico)	Rose Bowl, Pasadena, California	
2024	82,154	Real Madrid vs. Barcelona	Soccer Champions Tour 2024	MetLife Stadium, East Rutherford, New Jersey	
2017	82,104	Juventus vs. Barcelona	2017 ICC	MetLife Stadium, East Rutherford, New Jersey	
2023	82,026	Barcelona vs. Real Madrid	Soccer Champions Tour	AT&T Stadium, Arlington, Texas	
2016	82,012	Bayern Munich vs. Real Madrid	2016 ICC	MetLife Stadium, East Rutherford, New Jersey	
2009	81,807	Chelsea vs. Internazionale	2009 WFC	Rose Bowl, Pasadena, California	
2011	81,807	Manchester United vs. Barcelona	2011 WFC	FedExField, Landover, Maryland	
2017	80,162	Barcelona vs. Manchester United	2017 ICC	FedExField, Landover, Maryland	
2015	78,914	Chelsea vs. Barcelona	2015 ICC	FedExField, Landover, Maryland	
2022	78,128	Bayern Munich vs. Manchester City	Audi Summer Tour	Lambeau Field, Green Bay, Wisconsin	
2024	77,559	Manchester United vs. Liverpool	Friendly	Williams–Brice Stadium, Columbia, South Carolina	
2018	71,597	Real Madrid vs. Juventus	2018 ICC	FedExField, Landover, Maryland	
2024	71,280	Manchester City vs. Chelsea	Friendly	Ohio Stadium, Columbus, Ohio	
2009	71,203	Chelsea vs. Milan	2009 WFC	M&T Bank Stadium, Baltimore, Maryland	
2023	70,814	Real Madrid vs. Milan	Soccer Champions Tour	Rose Bowl, Pasadena, California	
2023	70,789	Newcastle United vs. Chelsea	2023 Premier League Summer Series	Mercedes-Benz Stadium, Atlanta, Georgia	
2023	70,789	Brentford vs. Brighton & Hove Albion	2023 Premier League Summer Series	Mercedes-Benz Stadium, Atlanta, Georgia	
2011	70,780	Chivas de Guadalajara vs. Barcelona	2011 WFC	Sun Life Stadium, Miami Gardens, Florida	
2023	70,223	Arsenal vs. Barcelona	Soccer Champions Tour	SoFi Stadium, Inglewood, California	
2024	69,879	Liverpool vs. Arsenal	Friendly	Lincoln Financial Field, Philadelphia, Pennsylvania	
2014	69,364	Milan vs. Liverpool	2014 ICC	Bank of America Stadium, Charlotte, North Carolina	
2015	68,416	Barcelona vs. Manchester United	2015 ICC	Levi's Stadium, Santa Clara, California	
2023	67,801	Real Madrid vs. Manchester United	Soccer Champions Tour	NRG Stadium, Houston, Texas	
2017	67,401	Manchester United vs. Manchester City	2017 ICC	NRG Stadium, Houston, Texas	
2013	67,273	Real Madrid vs. Chelsea	2013 ICC	Sun Life Stadium, Miami Gardens, Florida	
2018	66,805	Barcelona vs. Tottenham Hotspur	2018 ICC	Rose Bowl, Pasadena, California	
2017	66,014	Real Madrid vs. Barcelona	2017 ICC	Hard Rock Stadium, Miami Gardens, Florida	
2023	65,128	Chelsea vs. Brighton & Hove Albion	2023 Premier League Summer Series	Lincoln Financial Field, Philadelphia, Pennsylvania	
2017	65,109	Real Madrid vs. Manchester United	2017 ICC	Levi's Stadium, Santa Clara, California	
2018	64,141	Manchester United vs. Real Madrid	2018 ICC	Hard Rock Stadium, Miami Gardens, Florida	
2016	64,101	Chelsea vs. Milan	2016 ICC	U.S. Bank Stadium, Minneapolis, Minnesota	
2022	63,811	Arsenal vs. Chelsea	2022 Florida Cup	Camping World Stadium, Orlando, Florida	
2024	62,617	Real Madrid vs. Chelsea	Soccer Champions Tour 2024	Bank of America Stadium, Charlotte, North Carolina	
2023	63,503	Juventus vs. Real Madrid	2023 Florida Cup	Camping World Stadium, Orlando, Florida	
2014	62,583	Real Madrid vs. Internazionale	2014 ICC	California Memorial Stadium, Berkeley, California	
2024	62,486	Arsenal vs. Manchester United	Friendly	SoFi Stadium, Inglewood, California	
2019	61,417	Club América vs. Chivas de Guadalajara	Friendly (El Súper Clásico)	Soldier Field, Chicago, Illinois	
2015	61,351	Manchester United vs. Paris Saint-Germain	2015 ICC	Soldier Field, Chicago, Illinois	
2022	61,299	Real Madrid vs. Barcelona	Soccer Champions Tour	Allegiant Stadium, Paradise, Nevada	
2014	61,238	Manchester United vs. Internazionale	2014 ICC	FedExField, Landover, Maryland	
2015	61,224	Paris Saint-Germain vs. Chelsea	2015 ICC	Bank of America Stadium, Charlotte, North Carolina	
1980	60,384	Manchester City vs. Roma	1980 TACC	Giants Stadium, East Rutherford, New Jersey	
2019	60,143	Bayern Munich vs. Real Madrid	2019 ICC	NRG Stadium, Houston, Texas	
2011	60,087	Barcelona vs. Club América	2011 WFC	Cowboys Stadium, Arlington, Texas	
2019	60,043	Napoli vs. Barcelona	2019 La Liga-Serie A Cup	Michigan Stadium, Ann Arbor, Michigan	

== See also ==
- Major League Soccer attendance
- National Women's Soccer League attendance
- Soccer in the United States
- List of soccer clubs in the United States
- List of soccer stadiums in the United States
- List of women's association football attendance records
