= 2014 International Champions Cup =

Tournament details
- Host countries: Canada; United States
- Dates: July 24 – August 4
- Teams: 8 (from 1 confederation)
- Venues: 13 (in 13 host cities)

Final positions
- Champions: (England) Manchester United (1st title)
- Runners-up: (England) Liverpool

Tournament statistics
- Matches played: 13
- Goals scored: 38 (2.92 per match)
- Attendance: 642,134 (49,395 per match)
- Top scorer(s): (Montenegro) Stevan Jovetić (5 goals)
- Best player: (England) Wayne Rooney

The 2014 International Champions Cup (or ICC) was a friendly association football tournament played in Canada and the United States. It began on July 24 when Olympiacos defeated Milan 3–0 at BMO Field in Toronto, Canada and ended on August 4 at Sun Life Stadium in Miami Gardens, United States. This tournament followed the 2013 edition and was staged throughout the United States, with one match held in Canada. The participating teams were Liverpool, Manchester City and Manchester United of England; Milan, Inter Milan and Roma of Italy; Olympiacos of Greece; and defending champions Real Madrid of Spain. Manchester United won the tournament, having beaten Liverpool 3–1 in the final.

The group match between Real Madrid and Manchester United at Michigan Stadium in Ann Arbor had an attendance of 109,318, a record crowd for a soccer match in the United States.

== Teams ==
Country	Team	Location	Confederation	League
England	Liverpool	Liverpool	UEFA	Premier League
England	Manchester City	Manchester	UEFA	Premier League
England	Manchester United	Manchester	UEFA	Premier League
Italy	Inter Milan	Milan	UEFA	Serie A
Italy	Milan	Milan	UEFA	Serie A
Italy	Roma	Rome	UEFA	Serie A
Greece	Olympiacos	Piraeus	UEFA	Super League Greece
Spain	Real Madrid	Madrid	UEFA	La Liga

== Venues ==
Canada

Toronto	Location of the host city of the 2014 International Champions Cup in Canada.
BMO Field	Location of the host city of the 2014 International Champions Cup in Canada.
43°37′58″N 79°25′07″W	Location of the host city of the 2014 International Champions Cup in Canada.
Capacity: 21,566	Location of the host city of the 2014 International Champions Cup in Canada.

United States

Berkeley	Denver	Dallas	Minneapolis
California Memorial Stadium	Sports Authority Field at Mile High	Cotton Bowl	TCF Bank Stadium
37°52′16″N 122°15′1″W	39°44′38″N 105°1′12″W	32°46′47″N 96°45′35″W	44.976°N 93.225°W
Capacity: 62,467	Capacity: 76,125	Capacity: 92,100	Capacity: 50,805
Chicago	Location of the host cities of the 2014 International Champions Cup in the United States.		Ann Arbor
Soldier Field	Location of the host cities of the 2014 International Champions Cup in the United States.		Michigan Stadium
41°51′45″N 87°37′0″W	Location of the host cities of the 2014 International Champions Cup in the United States.		42°15′57″N 83°44′55″W
Capacity: 63,500	Location of the host cities of the 2014 International Champions Cup in the United States.		Capacity: 109,901
Pittsburgh	Location of the host cities of the 2014 International Champions Cup in the United States.		Charlotte
Heinz Field	Location of the host cities of the 2014 International Champions Cup in the United States.		Bank of America Stadium
40°26′48″N 80°0′57″W	Location of the host cities of the 2014 International Champions Cup in the United States.		35°13′33″N 80°51′10″W
Capacity: 65,500	Location of the host cities of the 2014 International Champions Cup in the United States.		Capacity: 74,455
Miami Gardens	Landover	Philadelphia	New York
Sun Life Stadium	FedExField	Lincoln Financial Field	Yankee Stadium
25°57′29″N 80°14′20″W	38°54′28″N 76°51′52″W	39°54′3″N 75°10′3″W	40°49′45″N 73°55′35″W
Capacity: 74,918	Capacity: 79,000	Capacity: 69,176	Capacity: 54,251

== Format ==
The tournament consisted of two groups of four: Group A and Group B. The groups were played as a round-robin, with each team playing three matches. The winners of each group played in the final at the Sun Life Stadium in Miami Gardens on August 4.

Three points were awarded for a win in regulation time, two for a win by penalty shootout, one for a loss by penalty shootout, and zero for a loss in regulation time. A team's placing was based on (a) points earned in the three group matches (b) head-to-head result, (c) goal differential, (d) goals scored.

== Group stage ==
=== Group A ===
Pos	Team	Pld	W	WP	LP	L	GF	GA	GD	Pts	Qualification
1	(England) Manchester United	3	2	1	0	0	6	3	+3	8	Advance to Final
2	(Italy) Inter Milan	3	1	1	1	0	3	1	+2	6	
3	(Italy) Roma	3	1	0	0	2	3	5	−2	3	
4	(Spain) Real Madrid	3	0	0	1	2	2	5	−3	1	

Source: International Champions Cup
Rules for classification: 1) points; 2) head-to-head result; 3) goal difference; 4) goals scored

==== Matches ====
July 26
14:10 (MDT)

Manchester United (England)	3–2	(Italy) Roma
Rooney 36', 45+1' (pen.); Mata 39'	Report	Pjanić 75'; Totti 89' (pen.)

Sports Authority Field, Denver
Attendance: 54,116
Referee: Allen Chapman (United States)

July 26
15:00 (PDT)

Real Madrid (Spain)	1–1	(Italy) Inter Milan
Bale 10'	Report	Icardi 68' (pen.)
Penalties
Isco (penalty missed); Vázquez (penalty scored); Nacho (penalty scored); Illarramendi (penalty missed); Mascarell (penalty missed)	2–3	(penalty scored) Vidić; (penalty missed) Nagatomo; (penalty missed) M'Vila; (penalty scored) Juan Jesus; (penalty scored) Icardi

California Memorial Stadium, Berkeley
Attendance: 62,583
Referee: Ricardo Salazar (United States)

July 29
19:00 (EDT)

Manchester United (England)	0–0	(Italy) Inter Milan
	Report
Penalties
Young (penalty scored); Hernández (penalty scored); Cleverley (penalty scored); Kagawa (penalty scored); Fletcher (penalty scored)	5–3	(penalty scored) Guarín; (penalty scored) M'Vila; (penalty scored) Taïder; (penalty missed) Andreolli

FedExField, Landover
Attendance: 61,238
Referee: Edvin Jurisevic (United States)

July 29
20:15 (CDT)

Real Madrid (Spain)	0–1	(Italy) Roma
	Report	Totti 58'

Cotton Bowl, Dallas
Attendance: 57,512
Referee: Drew Fischer (Canada)

August 2
13:00 (EDT)

Inter Milan (Italy)	2–0	(Italy) Roma
Vidić 45+2'; Nagatomo 69'	Report

Lincoln Financial Field, Philadelphia
Attendance: 12,169
Referee: Geoff Gamble (Canada)

August 2
16:06 (EDT)

Manchester United (England)	3–1	(Spain) Real Madrid
Young 20', 37'; Hernández 80'	Report	Bale 27' (pen.)

Michigan Stadium, Ann Arbor
Attendance: 109,318
Referee: Hilario Grajeda (United States)

=== Group B ===
Pos	Team	Pld	W	WP	LP	L	GF	GA	GD	Pts	Qualification
1	(England) Liverpool	3	2	1	0	0	5	2	+3	8	Advance to Final
2	(Greece) Olympiacos	3	1	1	0	1	5	3	+2	5	
3	(England) Manchester City	3	1	0	2	0	9	5	+4	5	
4	(Italy) Milan	3	0	0	0	3	1	10	−9	0	

Source: International Champions Cup
Rules for classification: 1) points; 2) head-to-head result; 3) goal difference; 4) goals scored

==== Matches ====
July 24
20:00 (EDT)

Olympiacos (Greece)	3–0	(Italy) Milan
Domínguez 16'; Diamantakos 49'; Bouchalakis 77'	Report

BMO Field, Toronto
Attendance: 10,603
Referee: Silviu Petrescu (Canada)

July 27
16:00 (EDT)

Milan (Italy)	1–5	(England) Manchester City
Muntari 42'	Report	Jovetić 12', 58'; Sinclair 14'; Navas 23'; Iheanacho 26'

Heinz Field, Pittsburgh
Attendance: 34,347
Referee: Armando Villarreal (United States)

July 27
17:00 (CDT)

Liverpool (England)	1–0	(Greece) Olympiacos
Sterling 5'	Report

Soldier Field, Chicago
Attendance: 36,170
Referee: Jose Carlos Rivero (United States)

July 30
19:00 (EDT)

Manchester City (England)	2–2	(England) Liverpool
Jovetić 53', 67'	Report	Henderson 59'; Sterling 85'
Penalties
Kolarov (penalty missed); Touré (penalty missed); Navas (penalty missed); Iheanacho (penalty scored)	1–3	(penalty missed) Sturridge; (penalty scored) Can; (penalty scored) Henderson; (penalty scored) Lucas

Yankee Stadium, New York
Attendance: 49,653
Referee: Silviu Petrescu (Canada)

August 2
14:00 (CDT)

Olympiacos (Greece)	2–2	(England) Manchester City
Diamantakos 37', 66'	Report	Jovetić 35'; Kolarov 89' (pen.)
Penalties
Lykogiannis (penalty scored); Dossevi (penalty missed); Kolovos (penalty scored); Ghazaryan (penalty scored); Papadopoulos (penalty missed); Bouchalakis (penalty scored); Papazoglou (penalty scored)	5–4	(penalty scored) Silva; (penalty scored) Kolarov; (penalty missed) Milner; (penalty missed) Sinclair; (penalty scored) Zuculini; (penalty scored) Guidetti; (penalty missed) Richards

TCF Bank Stadium, Minneapolis
Attendance: 34,047

August 2
18:30 (EDT)

Milan (Italy)	0–2	(England) Liverpool
	Report	Allen 17'; Suso 89'

Bank of America Stadium, Charlotte
Attendance: 69,364
Referee: David Gantar (Canada)

== Final ==
August 4
20:00 (EDT)

Manchester United (England)	3–1	(England) Liverpool
Rooney 55'; Mata 57'; Lingard 88'	Report	Gerrard 14' (pen.)

Sun Life Stadium, Miami Gardens
Attendance: 51,014
Referee: Mark Geiger (United States)

== Top goalscorers ==
Rank	Player	Team	Goals
1	(Montenegro) Stevan Jovetić	(England) Manchester City	5
2	(England) Wayne Rooney	(England) Manchester United	3
2	(Greece) Dimitrios Diamantakos	(Greece) Olympiacos	3
4	(Wales) Gareth Bale	(Spain) Real Madrid	2
4	(England) Ashley Young	(England) Manchester United	2
4	(Spain) Juan Mata	(England) Manchester United	2
4	(England) Raheem Sterling	(England) Liverpool	2
4	(Italy) Francesco Totti	(Italy) Roma	2

== Media coverage ==
Territory	Channel	Ref
Albania	Digitalb (SuperSport)	
Arab League	Abu Dhabi Sports Channel	
Australia	Fox Sports	
Austria	Servus TV	
Brazil	Fox Sports	
Canada	Sportsnet World	
China	CCTV-5 and CCTV-5+	
Denmark	TV3 Sport	
Estonia	Viasat Sport Baltic	
France	beIN Sports	
Germany	Servus TV	
Greece	nova sports 1 (+ HD)	
Hong Kong	Cable TV Hong Kong	
India	SONY SIX HD	
Indonesia	Indosiar	
Iran	IRIB TV3	
Israel	Sport2	
Italy	Sky Sport	
Netherlands	Sport1	
Norway	Viasat	
Philippines	ABS-CBN Sports and Action	
Romania	Dolce Sport	
Serbia	Arena Sport	
South Korea	SBS Sports	
Sweden	Viasat	
Turkey	Kanal D, tv2	
United Kingdom	Sky Sports, LFC TV and MUTV	
United States	Fox Sports, NBCSN, ESPN Deportes	
Vietnam	K+	

== See also ==
- World Football Challenge, an exhibition tournament for mid-season American clubs and pre-season European clubs that was held from 2009 until 2012.
