= 2009–10 AC Milan season =

Milan
2009–10 season
- Chairman: Vacant
- Head coach: Leonardo
- Stadium: San Siro
- Serie A: 3rd
- Coppa Italia: Quarter-finals
- UEFA Champions League: Round of 16
- Top goalscorer: League: Marco Borriello (14); All: Ronaldinho (15)
- Average home league attendance: 42,809
Home colours	Away colours	Third colours

The 2009–10 Associazione Calcio Milan season was the 76th Serie A season in the history of the club.

It was the club's first season since 1983–84 not to feature captain Paolo Maldini, who retired at the end of the previous campaign.

== Club ==
=== Management ===
Position	Staff
Head coach	(Brazil) Leonardo
Assistant coach	(Italy) Mauro Tassotti
Goalkeeping coaches	(Italy) Villiam Vecchi (Italy) Valerio Fiori
Fitness coaches	(Italy) Daniele Tognaccini (Italy) Giovanni Mauri
Club doctor	(Italy) Massimo Manara

Last updated: 7 June 2009

=== Other information ===
President	(Italy) Adriano Galliani
Ground (capacity and dimensions)	San Siro (80, 074 / 105m x 68m)

Source: San Siro

== Players ==
=== Squad information ===

Starting line-up.

Updated 18 August 2009.

Note: Flags indicate national team as defined under FIFA eligibility rules; some limited exceptions apply. Players may hold more than one non-FIFA nationality.

No.	Pos.	Nation	Player
1	GK	BRA	Dida
4	DF	GEO	Kakha Kaladze
5	DF	USA	Oguchi Onyewu
7	FW	BRA	Alexandre Pato
8	MF	ITA	Gennaro Gattuso
9	FW	ITA	Filippo Inzaghi
10	MF	NED	Clarence Seedorf
11	FW	NED	Klaas-Jan Huntelaar
12	GK	ITA	Christian Abbiati
13	DF	ITA	Alessandro Nesta
15	DF	ITA	Gianluca Zambrotta
16	MF	FRA	Mathieu Flamini
17	FW	ITA	Gianmarco Zigoni
18	DF	CZE	Marek Jankulovski
19	DF	ITA	Giuseppe Favalli

No.	Pos.	Nation	Player
20	DF	ITA	Ignazio Abate
21	MF	ITA	Andrea Pirlo
22	FW	ITA	Marco Borriello
23	MF	ITA	Massimo Ambrosini (captain)
25	DF	ITA	Daniele Bonera
30	MF	BRA	Mancini
31	GK	ITA	Flavio Roma
32	MF	ENG	David Beckham
33	DF	BRA	Thiago Silva
40	FW	GHA	Dominic Adiyiah
44	DF	ITA	Massimo Oddo
51	MF	SLE	Rodney Strasser
56	DF	ITA	Andrea De Vito
77	DF	ITA	Luca Antonini
80	MF	BRA	Ronaldinho

=== List of 2009–10 transfers ===
(*) denotes a winter transfer

==== In ====
Note: Flags indicate national team as defined under FIFA eligibility rules; some limited exceptions apply. Players may hold more than one non-FIFA nationality.

No.	Pos.	Nation	Player
33	DF	BRA	Thiago Silva (from Fluminense, €10M)
20	DF	ITA	Ignazio Abate (from Torino, undisclosed)
30	GK	ITA	Marco Storari (loan return from Fiorentina)
17	FW	ITA	Gianmarco Zigoni (from Treviso, undisclosed)
5	DF	USA	Oguchi Onyewu (from Standard Liège, free transfer)
11	FW	NED	Klaas-Jan Huntelaar (from Real Madrid, €15M)

No.	Pos.	Nation	Player
31	GK	ITA	Flavio Roma (from Monaco, undisclosed)
44	DF	ITA	Massimo Oddo (loan return from Bayern Munich)
32	MF	ENG	David Beckham (on loan from Los Angeles Galaxy) *
40	FW	GHA	Dominic Adiyiah (from Fredrikstad) *
30	MF	BRA	Mancini (on loan from Internazionale)

==== Out ====
Note: Flags indicate national team as defined under FIFA eligibility rules; some limited exceptions apply. Players may hold more than one non-FIFA nationality.

No.	Pos.	Nation	Player
3	DF	ITA	Paolo Maldini (retired)
5	MF	BRA	Emerson (Santos)
22	MF	BRA	Kaká (to Real Madrid, €65M)
—	MF	FRA	Yoann Gourcuff (to Bordeaux, €15M)
—	FW	ITA	Alberto Paloschi (co-ownership with Parma, undisclosed)

No.	Pos.	Nation	Player
16	GK	AUS	Zeljko Kalac (Kavala)
20	MF	URU	Tabaré Viudez (Defensor Sporting.)
14	MF	URU	Mathias Cardacio (Defensor Sporting.)
—	DF	ITA	Davide Astori (co-ownership with Cagliari, undisclosed)
—	DF	ITA	Elia Legati (co-ownership with Crotone, undisclosed)

==== Out on loan ====
Note: Flags indicate national team as defined under FIFA eligibility rules; some limited exceptions apply. Players may hold more than one non-FIFA nationality.

No.	Pos.	Nation	Player
—	FW	GAB	Pierre-Emerick Aubameyang (to Lille)
—	FW	GAB	Willy Aubameyang (to KAS Eupen)
—	DF	ITA	Matteo Bruscagin (to Gubbio)
36	DF	ITA	Matteo Darmian (to Padova)
—	DF	BRA	Digão (to Lecce)
—	GK	ITA	Davide Facchin (to Pavia)

No.	Pos.	Nation	Player
—	DF	BRA	Marcus (to Livorno)
—	MF	NGA	Wilfred Osuji (to Varese)
—	MF	NED	Chedric Seedorf (to Monza)
—	FW	NGA	Kingsley Umunegbu (to Varese)
30	GK	ITA	Marco Storari (to Sampdoria)

== Squad statistics ==
Updated to games played 16 May 2010.

No.	Pos	Nat	Player	Total		Serie A		Coppa Italia		UEFA Champions League	
No.	Pos	Nat	Player	Apps	Goals	Apps	Goals	Apps	Goals	Apps	Goals
1	GK	(Brazil) BRA	Dida	28	0	23	0	0	0	5	0
20	DF	(Italy) ITA	Abate	36	0	22+8	0	0+1	0	3+2	0
13	DF	(Italy) ITA	Nesta	30	3	22+1	3	0	0	7	0
33	DF	(Brazil) BRA	Thiago Silva	40	2	33	2	0	0	7	0
77	DF	(Italy) ITA	Antonini	25	1	20+2	1	1	0	2	0
10	MF	(Netherlands) NED	Seedorf	37	6	25+4	5	0	0	6+2	1
8	MF	(Italy) ITA	Gattuso	28	0	23+2	0	2	0	0+1	0
21	MF	(Italy) ITA	Pirlo	43	1	33+1	0	0+1	0	8	1
23	MF	(Italy) ITA	Ambrosini	39	1	26+4	1	1	0	8	0
80	MF	(Brazil) BRA	Ronaldinho	42	15	32+2	12	0	0	7+1	3
22	FW	(Italy) ITA	Borriello	35	15	27+2	14	0+1	0	4+1	1
12	GK	(Italy) ITA	Abbiati	11	0	8+1	0	1	0	1	0
7	FW	(Brazil) BRA	Pato	30	14	20+3	12	0	0	7	2
15	DF	(Italy) ITA	Zambrotta	30	0	19+5	0	1	0	4+1	0
19	DF	(Italy) ITA	Favalli	18	0	15+1	0	1	0	0+1	0
16	MF	(France) FRA	Flamini	32	1	14+11	0	2	1	3+2	0
11	FW	(Netherlands) NED	Huntelaar	30	7	11+14	7	2	0	2+1	0
44	DF	(Italy) ITA	Oddo	18	0	9+5	0	0	0	4	0
32	MF	(England) ENG	Beckham	13	0	7+4	0	0	0	1+1	0
25	DF	(Italy) ITA	Bonera	11	0	6+1	0	2	0	2	0
18	DF	(Czech Republic) CZE	Jankulovski	15	0	5+7	0	1	0	2	0
4	DF	(Georgia (country)) GEO	Kaladze	10	0	5+1	0	2	0	1+1	0
9	FW	(Italy) ITA	Inzaghi	33	5	4+20	2	2	1	3+4	2
30	FW	(Brazil) BRA	Mancini	7	0	3+4	0	0	0	0	0
5	DF	(United States) USA	Onyewu	1	0	0	0	0	0	0+1	0
17	FW	(Italy) ITA	Zigoni	1	0	0+1	0	0	0	0	0
31	GK	(Italy) ITA	Roma	0	0	0	0	0	0	0	0
40	FW	(Ghana) GHA	Adiyiah	0	0	0	0	0	0	0	0
56	DF	(Italy) ITA	De Vito	2	0	0+1	0	1	0	0	0
58	FW	(Italy) ITA	Verdi	2	0	0	0	0+2	0	0	0

Note: Starting appearance + Substitute appearance

== Pre-season and friendlies ==
Win Draw Loss

12 July 2009 Friendly	Varese	0–2	Milan	Varese, Italy
			Inzaghi 10', 48'	Stadium: Stadio Franco Ossola; Referee: Emilio Ostinelli (Italy)

22 July 2009 World Football Challenge	América	2–1	Milan	Atlanta, Georgia, United States
19:00 EDT (UTC-04:00)	Esqueda 56'; Márquez 84'		Inzaghi 66'	Stadium: Georgia Dome; Attendance: 53,600; Referee: Alex Prus (United States)

24 July 2009 World Football Challenge	Chelsea	2–1	Milan	Baltimore, Maryland, United States
20:00 EDT (UTC-04:00)	Drogba 7'; Zhirkov 69'		Seedorf 38'	Stadium: M&T Bank Stadium; Attendance: 71,203; Referee: Mark Geiger (United States)

26 July 2009 World Football Challenge	Inter Milan	2–0	Milan	Foxborough, Massachusetts, United States
17:00 EDT (UTC-04:00)	Milito 4', 75'			Stadium: Gillette Stadium; Attendance: 42,531; Referee: Jorge González (United States)

29 July 2009 Audi Cup	Bayern Munich	4–1	Milan	Munich, Germany
20:45 CEST (UTC+02:00)	Müller 12', 90'; Schweinsteiger 79'; Sène 89'		Pirlo 81'	Stadium: Allianz Arena; Attendance: 61,000; Referee: Günter Perl (Germany)

30 July 2009 Audi Cup	Boca Juniors	1–1 (4–3 p)	Milan	Munich, Germany
18:30 CEST (UTC+02:00)	Viatri 87'		Thiago Silva 27'	Stadium: Allianz Arena; Attendance: 61,000; Referee: Peter Sippel (Germany)
	Penalties
	Palermo (penalty scored); Riquelme (penalty scored); Insúa (penalty missed); Battaglia (penalty scored); Viatri (penalty scored)		(penalty scored) Ronaldinho; (penalty missed) Pirlo; (penalty scored) Jankulovski; (penalty scored) Thiago Silva; (penalty missed) Pato

8 August 2009 Eusébio Cup	Benfica	1–1 (5–4 p)	Milan	Lisbon, Portugal
19:00 CEST (UTC+02:00)	Cardozo 58'		Sidnei 87' (o.g.)	Stadium: Estádio da Luz; Attendance: 62,342; Referee: João Ferreira (Portugal)
	Penalties
	Keirrison (penalty scored); Shaffer (penalty scored); Coentrão (penalty missed); Amorim (penalty scored); Weldon (penalty missed); Yebda (penalty scored); Patric (penalty missed); Sidnei (penalty scored)		(penalty scored) Pirlo; (penalty missed) Ronaldinho; (penalty scored) Jankulovski; (penalty missed) Silva; (penalty scored) Borriello; (penalty scored) Pato; (penalty missed) Zambrotta; (penalty missed) Antonini

14 August 2009 TIM Trophy	Milan	0–1	Internazionale	Pescara, Italy
21:30 CEST (UTC+02:00)		Report	Balotelli 23'	Stadium: Stadio Adriatico; Referee: Paolo Valeri (Italy)

14 August 2009 TIM Trophy	Milan	0–2	Juventus	Pescara, Italy
22:30 CEST (UTC+02:00)		Report	Amauri 13'; Iaquinta 31'	Stadium: Stadio Adriatico; Referee: Carmine Russo (Italy)

17 August 2009 Trofeo Luigi Berlusconi	Milan	1–1 (5–4 p)	Juventus	Milan, Italy
20:45 CEST (UTC+02:00)	Pato 68'		Legrottaglie (yellow card) 3'; Diego 27'	Stadium: San Siro; Attendance: 41,906; Referee: Nicola Rizzoli (Italy)
	Penalties
	Pirlo (penalty scored); Ronaldinho (penalty scored); Borriello (penalty scored); Inzaghi (penalty scored); Silva (penalty scored)		(penalty missed) Falque; (penalty scored) Trezeguet; (penalty scored) Melo; (penalty scored) Marchisio; (penalty scored) Amauri

== Competitions ==
=== Overall ===
Competition	Started round	Final position	Final Round	First match	Last match
Serie A	Round 1	3rd Place	Round 38	22 August 2009	16 May 2010
Coppa Italia	Round of 16	Quarter-finals	Quarter-finals	13 January 2010	27 January 2010
UEFA Champions League	Group Stage	Round of 16	Round of 16	15 September 2009	10 March 2010

=== Serie A ===
==== League table ====
Pos	Team	Pld	W	D	L	GF	GA	GD	Pts	Qualification or relegation
1	Internazionale (C)	38	24	10	4	75	34	+41	82	Qualification to Champions League group stage
2	Roma	38	24	8	6	68	41	+27	80	Qualification to Champions League group stage
3	Milan	38	20	10	8	60	39	+21	70	Qualification to Champions League group stage
4	Sampdoria	38	19	10	9	49	41	+8	67	Qualification to Champions League play-off round
5	Palermo	38	18	11	9	59	47	+12	65	Qualification to Europa League play-off round

Source: Lega Calcio and Yahoo! Sport
Rules for classification: 1) points; 2) head-to-head points; 3) head-to-head goal difference; 4) head-to-head goals scored; 5) goal difference; 6) number of goals scored.
(C) Champions

==== Results summary ====
Overall								Home						Away					
Pld	W	D	L	GF	GA	GD	Pts	W	D	L	GF	GA	GD	W	D	L	GF	GA	GD
38	20	10	8	60	39	+21	70	12	5	2	37	20	+17	8	5	6	23	19	+4

==== Results by round ====
Round	1	2	3	4	5	6	7	8	9	10	11	12	13	14	15	16	17	18	19	20	21	22	23	24	25	26	27	28	29	30	31	32	33	34	35	36	37	38
Ground	A	H	A	H	A	H	A	H	A	A	H	A	H	A	H	H	A	H	A	H	A	H	A	H	A	H	A	H	H	A	H	A	H	A	A	H	A	H
Result	W	L	D	W	L	D	D	W	W	D	W	W	W	W	W	L	W	W	W	W	L	D	D	W	W	W	D	W	D	L	D	W	D	L	L	W	L	W
Position	2	11	10	8	11	11	12	8	6	5	4	3	3	2	2	2	2	2	2	2	2	2	3	3	2	2	2	2	2	3	3	3	3	3	3	3	3	3

A = Away; H = Home; W = Win; D = Draw; L = Loss

==== Matches ====
22 August 2009 1	Siena	1–2	Milan	Siena
20:45 CEST (UTC+02:00)	Ghezzal 34'		Pato 29', 48'	Stadium: Montepaschi Arena; Attendance: 15,028; Referee: Paolo Tagliavento

29 August 2009 2	Milan	0–4	Internazionale	Milan
20:45 CEST (UTC+02:00)			Thiago Motta 29'; Milito 36' (pen.); Maicon 45+1'; Stanković 67'	Stadium: San Siro; Attendance: 78,467; Referee: Nicola Rizzoli

12 September 2009 3	Livorno	0–0	Milan	Livorno
18:00 CEST (UTC+02:00)				Stadium: Stadio Armando Picchi; Attendance: 15,982; Referee: Daniele Orsato

20 September 2009 4	Milan	1–0	Bologna	Milan
15:00 CEST (UTC+02:00)	Seedorf 75'			Stadium: San Siro; Attendance: 35,713; Referee: Paolo Valeri

23 September 2009 5	Udinese	1–0	Milan	Udine
20:45 CEST (UTC+02:00)	Di Natale 22'			Stadium: Stadio Friuli; Attendance: 21,000; Referee: Luca Banti

27 September 2009 6	Milan	0–0	Bari	Milan
20:45 CEST (UTC+02:00)				Stadium: San Siro; Attendance: 37,354; Referee: Christian Brighi

4 October 2009 7	Atalanta	1–1	Milan	Bergamo
15:00 CEST (UTC+02:00)	Tiribocchi 21'		Ronaldinho 83'	Stadium: Stadio Atleti Azzurri d'Italia; Attendance: 15,024; Referee: Gianluca Rocchi

18 October 2009 8	Milan	2–1	Roma	Milan
20:45 CEST (UTC+02:00)	Ronaldinho 56' (pen.); Pato 67'		Ménez 3'	Stadium: San Siro; Attendance: 40,000; Referee: Roberto Rosetti

25 October 2009 9	Chievo	1–2	Milan	Verona
20:45 CET (UTC+01:00)	Pinzi 7'		Nesta 81', 90+2'	Stadium: Stadio Marcantonio Bentegodi; Attendance: 15,737; Referee: Mauro Bergonzi

28 October 2009 10	Napoli	2–2	Milan	Naples
20:45 CET (UTC+01:00)	Cigarini 90+1'; Denis 90+3'		Inzaghi 3'; Pato 6'	Stadium: Stadio San Paolo; Attendance: 55,709; Referee: Nicola Rizzoli

31 October 2009 11	Milan	2–0	Parma	Milan
20:45 CET (UTC+01:00)	Borriello 12', 90+3'			Stadium: San Siro; Attendance: 33,303; Referee: Carmine Russo

8 November 2009 12	Lazio	1–2	Milan	Rome
15:00 CET (UTC+01:00)	Thiago Silva 64' (o.g.)		Thiago Silva 21'; Pato 35'	Stadium: Stadio Olimpico; Attendance: 38,207; Referee: Antonio Damato

22 November 2009 13	Milan	4–3	Cagliari	Milan
15:00 CET (UTC+01:00)	Seedorf 5'; Borriello 38'; Pato 40'; Ronaldinho 61' (pen.)		Matri 9'; Lazzari 30'; Nenê 69'	Stadium: San Siro; Attendance: 39,821; Referee: Paolo Valeri

29 November 2009 14	Catania	0–2	Milan	Catania
20:45 CET (UTC+01:00)			Huntelaar 90+3', 90+5'	Stadium: Stadio Angelo Massimino; Attendance: 16,699; Referee: Christian Brighi

5 December 2009 15	Milan	3–0	Sampdoria	Milan
18:00 CET (UTC+01:00)	Borriello 2'; Seedorf 21'; Pato 23'			Stadium: San Siro; Attendance: 42,824; Referee: Gianluca Rocchi

13 December 2009 16	Milan	0–2	Palermo	Milan
15:00 CET (UTC+01:00)			49' Miccoli; 62' Bresciano	Stadium: San Siro; Attendance: 39,253; Referee: Mauro Bergonzi

24 February 2010 17	Fiorentina	1–2	Milan	Florence
18:30 CET (UTC+01:00)	Gilardino 14'		Huntelaar 81'; Pato 90+1'	Stadium: Stadio Artemio Franchi; Attendance: 38,389; Referee: Roberto Rosetti

6 January 2010 18	Milan	5–2	Genoa	Milan
20:45 CET (UTC+01:00)	Ronaldinho (penalty missed) 12'; Ronaldinho 31' (pen.); Thiago Silva 38'; Borriello 48', 60'; Huntelaar 74' (pen.)		Sculli 25'; Suazo 79'	Stadium: San Siro; Attendance: 33,043; Referee: Daniele Orsato

10 January 2010 19	Juventus	0–3	Milan	Turin
20:45 CET (UTC+01:00)			Nesta 29'; Ronaldinho 72', 88'	Stadium: Stadio Olimpico; Attendance: 24,165; Referee: Antonio Damato

17 January 2010 20	Milan	4–0	Siena	Milan
15:00 CET (UTC+01:00)	Ronaldinho 12' (pen.), 72', 90'; Borriello 28'			Stadium: San Siro; Attendance: 35,958; Referee: Massimiliano Saccani

24 January 2010 21	Internazionale	2–0	Milan	Milan
20:45 CET (UTC+01:00)	Milito 10'; Pandev 65'		Ronaldinho (penalty missed) 90+2'	Stadium: Giuseppe Meazza; Attendance: 80,018; Referee: Gianluca Rocchi

31 January 2010 22	Milan	1–1	Livorno	Milan
15:00 CET (UTC+01:00)	Ambrosini 44'		Lucarelli 53'	Stadium: San Siro; Attendance: 34,998; Referee: Matteo Trefoloni

7 February 2010 23	Bologna	0–0	Milan	Bologna
15:00 CET (UTC+01:00)				Stadium: Stadio Renato Dall'Ara; Attendance: 27,089; Referee: Paolo Mazzoleni

12 February 2010 24	Milan	3–2	Udinese	Milan
20:45 CET (UTC+01:00)	Huntelaar 7', 57'; Pato 39'		Floro Flores 45+1'; Di Natale 87'	Stadium: San Siro; Attendance: 33,837; Referee: Domenico Celi

21 February 2010 25	Bari	0–2	Milan	Bari
20:45 CET (UTC+01:00)			Borriello 43'; Pato 69'	Stadium: Stadio San Nicola; Attendance: 51,943; Referee: Gabriele Gava

28 February 2010 26	Milan	3–1	Atalanta	Milan
15:00 CET (UTC+01:00)	Pato 30', 41'; Ronaldinho (penalty missed) 61'; Borriello 61'		Valdés 56'	Stadium: San Siro; Attendance: 38,688; Referee: Luca Banti

6 March 2010 27	Roma	0–0	Milan	Rome
20:45 CET (UTC+01:00)				Stadium: Stadio Olimpico; Attendance: 61,036; Referee: Paolo Tagliavento

14 March 2010 28	Milan	1–0	Chievo	Milan
20:45 CET (UTC+01:00)	Seedorf 90+1'			Stadium: San Siro; Attendance: 37,866; Referee: Emidio Morganti

21 March 2010 29	Milan	1–1	Napoli	Milan
15:00 CET (UTC+01:00)	Inzaghi 26'		Campagnaro 13'	Stadium: San Siro; Attendance: 51,044; Referee: Mauro Bergonzi

24 March 2010 30	Parma	1–0	Milan	Parma
20:45 CET (UTC+01:00)	Bojinov 90'			Stadium: Stadio Ennio Tardini; Attendance: 20,493; Referee: Emidio Morganti

28 March 2010 31	Milan	1–1	Lazio	Milan
20:45 CEST (UTC+02:00)	Borriello 19' (pen.)		Lichtsteiner 32'	Stadium: San Siro; Attendance: 40,393; Referee: Paolo Tagliavento

3 April 2010 32	Cagliari	2–3	Milan	Cagliari
15:00 CEST (UTC+02:00)	Ragatzu 17'; Matri 32'		Borriello 7'; Huntelaar 19'; Astori 38' (o.g.)	Stadium: Stadio Sant'Elia; Attendance: 20,000; Referee: Christian Brighi

11 April 2010 33	Milan	2–2	Catania	Milan
15:00 CEST (UTC+02:00)	Borriello 47', 80'		Maxi López 12'; Ricchiuti 43'	Stadium: San Siro; Attendance: 47,124; Referee: Daniele Orsato

18 April 2010 34	Sampdoria	2–1	Milan	Genoa
15:00 CEST (UTC+02:00)	Cassano 54' (pen.); Pazzini 90+2'		Borriello 20'	Stadium: Stadio Luigi Ferraris; Attendance: 28,764; Referee: Nicola Rizzoli

24 April 2010 35	Palermo	3–1	Milan	Palermo
20:45 CEST (UTC+02:00)	Bovo 9'; Hernández 18'; Miccoli 69'		Seedorf 55'	Stadium: Stadio Renzo Barbera; Attendance: 25,695; Referee: Andrea Romeo

1 May 2010 36	Milan	1–0	Fiorentina	Milan
20:45 CEST (UTC+02:00)	Ronaldinho 78' (pen.)			Stadium: San Siro; Attendance: 47,579; Referee: Carmine Russo

9 May 2010 37	Genoa	1–0	Milan	Genoa
15:00 CEST (UTC+02:00)	Sculli 57'			Stadium: Stadio Luigi Ferraris; Attendance: 0 Referee: Antonio Damato

15 May 2010 38	Milan	3–0	Juventus	Milan
20:45 CEST (UTC+02:00)	Antonini 14'; Ronaldinho 28', 67'			Stadium: San Siro; Attendance: 66.108; Referee: Matteo Trefoloni

=== Coppa Italia ===
13 January 2010 Round of 16	Milan	2–1	Novara	Milan
16:00 CET (UTC+01:00)	Inzaghi 11'; Flamini 81'		González 46'	Stadium: San Siro; Attendance: 15,061; Referee: Renzo Candussio

27 January 2010 Quarter-finals	Milan	0–1	Udinese	Milan
21:00 CET (UTC+01:00)			Inler 56'	Stadium: San Siro; Attendance: 5,513; Referee: Andrea Gervasoni

=== UEFA Champions League ===
==== Group stage ====
Pos	Team	Pld	W	D	L	GF	GA	GD	Pts	Qualification
1	(Spain) Real Madrid	6	4	1	1	15	7	+8	13	Advance to knockout phase
2	(Italy) Milan	6	2	3	1	8	7	+1	9	Advance to knockout phase
3	(France) Marseille	6	2	1	3	10	10	0	7	Transfer to Europa League
4	(Switzerland) Zürich	6	1	1	4	5	14	−9	4	

Source: RSSSF

15 September 2009 1	Marseille (France)	1–2	(Italy) Milan	Marseille, France
20:45 CEST (UTC+02:00)	Heinze 49'	Report	Inzaghi 28', 74'	Stadium: Stade Vélodrome; Attendance: 55,434; Referee: Claus Bo Larsen (Denmark)

30 September 2009 2	Milan (Italy)	0–1	(Switzerland) Zürich	Milan, Italy
20:45 CEST (UTC+02:00)		Report	Tihinen 10'	Stadium: San Siro; Attendance: 32,439; Referee: Florian Meyer (Germany)

21 October 2009 3	Real Madrid (Spain)	2–3	(Italy) Milan	Madrid, Spain
20:45 CEST (UTC+02:00)	Raúl 19'; Drenthe 76'	Report	Pirlo 62'; Pato 66', 88'	Stadium: Santiago Bernabéu; Attendance: 71,569; Referee: Frank De Bleeckere (Belgium)

3 November 2009 4	Milan (Italy)	1–1	(Spain) Real Madrid	Milan, Italy
20:45 CET (UTC+01:00)	Ronaldinho 35' (pen.)	Report	Benzema 29'	Stadium: San Siro; Attendance: 75,092; Referee: Felix Brych (Germany)

25 November 2009 5	Milan (Italy)	1–1	(France) Marseille	Milan, Italy
20:45 CET (UTC+01:00)	Borriello 10'	Report	Lucho 16'	Stadium: San Siro; Attendance: 49,063; Referee: Howard Webb (England)

8 December 2009 6	Zürich (Switzerland)	1–1	(Italy) Milan	Zürich, Switzerland
20:45 CET (UTC+01:00)	Gajić 29'	Report	Ronaldinho 64' (pen.)	Stadium: Letzigrund; Attendance: 24,100; Referee: Pedro Proença (Portugal)

==== Knockout phase ====
===== Round of 16 =====
16 February 2010 First leg	Milan (Italy)	2–3	(England) Manchester United	Milan, Italy
20:45 CET (UTC+01:00)	Ronaldinho 3'; Seedorf 85'	Report	Scholes 36'; Rooney 66', 74'	Stadium: San Siro; Attendance: 78,587; Referee: Olegário Benquerença (Portugal)

10 March 2010 Second leg	Manchester United (England)	4–0 (7–2 agg.)	(Italy) Milan	Manchester, England
20:45 CET (UTC+01:00)	Rooney 13', 46'; Park Ji-sung 59'; Fletcher 88'	Report		Stadium: Old Trafford; Attendance: 74,595; Referee: Massimo Busacca (Switzerland)

== Player seasonal records ==
Competitive matches only. Numbers in brackets indicate appearances made. Updated to games played 28 March 2010.

=== Goalscorers ===
Rank	Name	Serie A	Coppa Italia	UEFA Champions League	Total
1	(Brazil) Ronaldinho	12	-	3	15
2	(Italy) Marco Borriello	14	-	1	15
3	(Brazil) Alexandre Pato	12	-	2	14
4	(Netherlands) Klaas-Jan Huntelaar	7	-	-	7
5	(Netherlands) Clarence Seedorf	5	-	1	6
6	(Italy) Filippo Inzaghi	2	1	2	5
7	(Italy) Alessandro Nesta	3	-	-	3
8	(Brazil) Thiago Silva	2	-	-	2
9	(Italy) Andrea Pirlo	-	-	1	1
9	(France) Mathieu Flamini	-	1	-	1
9	(Italy) Massimo Ambrosini	1	-	-	1

=== Goals conceded ===
Rank	Name	Serie A	Coppa Italia	UEFA Champions League	Total	Average per game
1	(Brazil) Dida	16 (15)	-	7 (5)	23 (20)	1.150
2	(Italy) Marco Storari	7 (7)	1 (1)	2 (2)	10 (10)	1
3	(Italy) Christian Abbiati	3 (6)	1 (1)	4 (1)	8 (8)	1
