= 2017 International Champions Cup =

Tournament details
- Host country: China; Singapore; United States
- Dates: 18–30 July 2017
- Teams: 15 (from 1 confederation)
- Venue: 16 (in 16 host cities)

Final positions
- Champions: China: None; Singapore: (Italy) Inter Milan (1st title); United States: (Spain) Barcelona (1st title)

Tournament statistics
- Matches played: 19
- Goals scored: 62 (3.26 per match)
- Attendance: 917,619 (48,296 per match)
- Top scorer: (Brazil) Neymar (3 goals)

The 2017 International Champions Cup (or ICC) was the fifth edition of a series of friendly association football matches, organized to simulate a tournament. It began on 18 July and ended on 30 July 2017.

== Teams ==
China

Nation	Team
England	Arsenal
Germany	Bayern Munich
Germany	Borussia Dortmund
Italy	Inter Milan
Italy	Milan
France	Lyon

Singapore

Nation	Team
England	Chelsea
Germany	Bayern Munich
Italy	Inter Milan

United States

Nation	Team
England	Manchester City
England	Manchester United
England	Tottenham Hotspur
France	Paris Saint-Germain
Italy	Juventus
Italy	Roma
Spain	Barcelona
Spain	Real Madrid

== Venues ==
China

Nanjing	Shenzhen	Location of the host cities of the 2017 International Champions Cup in China.
Nanjing Olympic Sports Center	Longgang Stadium	Location of the host cities of the 2017 International Champions Cup in China.
Capacity: 61,443	Capacity: 60,334	Location of the host cities of the 2017 International Champions Cup in China.
Shanghai	Guangzhou	Location of the host cities of the 2017 International Champions Cup in China.
Shanghai Stadium	Guangzhou Higher Education Stadium	Location of the host cities of the 2017 International Champions Cup in China.
Capacity: 56,842	Capacity: 39,346	Location of the host cities of the 2017 International Champions Cup in China.

Singapore

Singapore	Location of the host city of the 2017 International Champions Cup in Singapore.
Singapore National Stadium	Location of the host city of the 2017 International Champions Cup in Singapore.
Capacity: 55,000	Location of the host city of the 2017 International Champions Cup in Singapore.

United States

Los Angeles	East Rutherford	Landover	Houston
Los Angeles Memorial Coliseum	MetLife Stadium	FedExField	NRG Stadium
Capacity: 93,098	Capacity: 82,566	Capacity: 80,162	Capacity: 71,795
Nashville	Location of the host cities of the 2017 International Champions Cup in the United States.		Santa Clara
Nissan Stadium	Location of the host cities of the 2017 International Champions Cup in the United States.		Levi's Stadium
Capacity: 69,143	Location of the host cities of the 2017 International Champions Cup in the United States.		Capacity: 68,500
Miami Gardens	Location of the host cities of the 2017 International Champions Cup in the United States.		Foxborough
Hard Rock Stadium	Location of the host cities of the 2017 International Champions Cup in the United States.		Gillette Stadium
Capacity: 66,014	Location of the host cities of the 2017 International Champions Cup in the United States.		Capacity: 65,878
Orlando	Detroit	Harrison	
Camping World Stadium	Comerica Park	Red Bull Arena	
Capacity: 60,219	Capacity: 41,299	Capacity: 26,192	

== Matches ==
=== China ===
18 July 2017
19:20 CST

Milan (Italy)	1–3	(Germany) Borussia Dortmund
Bacca 24'	Report	Şahin 16'; Aubameyang 20' (pen.), 62'

Guangzhou Higher Education Stadium, Guangzhou
Attendance: 19,000
Referee: Zhang Lei (China)

19 July 2017
19:20 CST
Audi Football Summit

Bayern Munich (Germany)	1–1	(England) Arsenal
Lewandowski 9' (pen.)	Report	Iwobi 90+4'
Penalties
Alaba (penalty missed); Hummels (penalty scored); Coman (penalty scored); Sanches (penalty missed); Bernat (penalty missed)	2–3	(penalty scored) Ramsey; (penalty missed) Elneny; (penalty scored) Monreal; (penalty scored) Iwobi

Shanghai Stadium, Shanghai
Attendance: 55,891
Referee: Guan Xing (China)

22 July 2017
17:35 CST
Audi Football Summit

Bayern Munich (Germany)	0–4	(Italy) Milan
	Report	Kessié 14'; Cutrone 25', 43'; Çalhanoğlu 85'

Longgang Stadium, Shenzhen
Attendance: 39,998
Referee: Ai Kun (China)

24 July 2017
20:05 CST

Inter Milan (Italy)	1–0	(France) Lyon
Jovetić 74'	Report

Nanjing Olympic Sports Centre, Nanjing
Referee: Ma Ning (China)

=== Singapore ===
25 July 2017
19:35 SGT

Chelsea (England)	2–3	(Germany) Bayern Munich
Alonso 45+3'; Batshuayi 85'	Report	Rafinha 6'; Müller 12', 27'

Singapore National Stadium, Singapore
Attendance: 48,522
Referee: Muhammad Taqi Aljaafari Bin Jahari (Singapore)

27 July 2017
19:35 SGT

Bayern Munich (Germany)	0–2	(Italy) Inter Milan
	Report	Éder 8', 30'

Singapore National Stadium, Singapore
Attendance: 23,388
Referee: Jansen Foo (Singapore)

29 July 2017
19:35 SGT

Chelsea (England)	1–2	(Italy) Inter Milan
Kondogbia 74' (o.g.)	Report	Jovetić 45+3'; Perišić 53'

Singapore National Stadium, Singapore
Attendance: 32,547
Referee: Sukhbir Singh (Singapore)

=== United States ===
19 July 2017
20:05 EDT

Roma (Italy)	1–1	(France) Paris Saint-Germain
Sadiq 60'	Report	Marquinhos 36'
Penalties
Bruno Peres (penalty scored); Nainggolan (penalty scored); Gerson (penalty missed); De Rossi (penalty scored)	3–5	(penalty scored) Lucas; (penalty scored) Nkunku; (penalty scored) Callegari; (penalty scored) Édouard; (penalty scored) Marquinhos

Comerica Park, Detroit, Michigan
Attendance: 36,289
Referee: Chris Penso (United States)

20 July 2017
21:05 CDT
Manchester derby

Manchester United (England)	2–0	(England) Manchester City
Lukaku 37'; Rashford 39'	Report

NRG Stadium, Houston, Texas
Attendance: 67,401
Referee: Ismail Elfath (United States)

22 July 2017
18:05 EDT

Juventus (Italy)	1–2	(Spain) Barcelona
Chiellini 63'	Report	Neymar 15', 26'

MetLife Stadium, East Rutherford, New Jersey
Attendance: 82,104
Referee: Edvin Jurisevic (United States)

22 July 2017
20:05 EDT

Paris Saint-Germain (France)	2–4	(England) Tottenham Hotspur
Cavani 6'; Pastore 36'	Report	Eriksen 11'; Dier 18'; Alderweireld 82'; Kane 88' (pen.)

Camping World Stadium, Orlando, Florida
Attendance: 33,322
Referee: Ted Unkel (United States)

23 July 2017
14:05 PDT

Real Madrid (Spain)	1–1	(England) Manchester United
Casemiro 69' (pen.)	Report	Lingard 45+1'
Penalties
Kovačić (penalty missed); Óscar (penalty missed); Quezada (penalty scored); Hernandez (penalty missed); Casemiro (penalty missed)	1–2	(penalty missed) Martial; (penalty missed) McTominay; (penalty scored) Mkhitaryan; (penalty missed) Lindelöf; (penalty scored) Blind

Levi's Stadium, Santa Clara, California
Attendance: 65,109
Referee: Kevin Stott (United States)

25 July 2017
20:05 EDT

Tottenham Hotspur (England)	2–3	(Italy) Roma
Winks 87'; Janssen 90+1'	Report	Perotti 13' (pen.); Ünder 70'; Tumminello 90+2'

Red Bull Arena, Harrison, New Jersey
Attendance: 26,192
Referee: Hilario Grajeda (United States)

26 July 2017
19:30 EDT

Barcelona (Spain)	1–0	(England) Manchester United
Neymar 31'	Report

FedExField, Landover, Maryland
Attendance: 80,162
Referee: Armando Villarreal (United States)

26 July 2017
21:05 EDT

Paris Saint-Germain (France)	2–3	(Italy) Juventus
Guedes 53'; Pastore 80'	Report	Higuaín 45'; Marchisio 62', 89' (pen.)

Hard Rock Stadium, Miami Gardens, Florida
Attendance: 44,444
Referee: Ted Unkel (United States)

26 July 2017
20:35 PDT

Manchester City (England)	4–1	(Spain) Real Madrid
Otamendi 52'; Sterling 59'; Stones 67'; Brahim 81'	Report	Óscar 90'

Los Angeles Memorial Coliseum, Los Angeles, California
Attendance: 93,098
Referee: Baldomero Toledo (United States)

29 July 2017
17:05 CDT

Manchester City (England)	3–0	(England) Tottenham Hotspur
Stones 10'; Sterling 72'; Brahim 90+1'	Report

Nissan Stadium, Nashville, Tennessee
Attendance: 56,232
Referee: Fotis Bazakos (United States)

29 July 2017
20:05 EDT
El Clásico Miami

Real Madrid (Spain)	2–3	(Spain) Barcelona
Kovačić 14'; Asensio 36'	Report	Messi 3'; Rakitić 7'; Piqué 50'

Hard Rock Stadium, Miami Gardens, Florida
Attendance: 66,014
Referee: Jair Marrufo (United States)

30 July 2017
16:05 EDT

Roma (Italy)	1–1	(Italy) Juventus
Džeko 74'	Report	Mandžukić 29'
Penalties
Tumminello (penalty missed); Pellegrini (penalty scored); Iturbe (penalty scored); Bruno Peres (penalty scored); Ünder (penalty scored)	4–5	(penalty scored) Lichtsteiner; (penalty scored) Barzagli; (penalty scored) Bernardeschi; (penalty scored) Khedira; (penalty scored) Douglas Costa

Gillette Stadium, Foxborough, Massachusetts
Attendance: 33,039
Referee: Jorge Gonzalez (United States)

== Tables ==
=== China ===
Pos	Team	Pld	W	WPEN	LPEN	L	GF	GA	GD	Pts
1	(Germany) Borussia Dortmund	1	1	0	0	0	3	1	+2	3
2	(Italy) Inter Milan	1	1	0	0	0	1	0	+1	3
3	(Italy) Milan	2	1	0	0	1	5	3	+2	3
4	(England) Arsenal	1	0	1	0	0	1	1	0	2
5	(Germany) Bayern Munich	2	0	0	1	1	1	5	−4	1
6	(France) Lyon	1	0	0	0	1	0	1	−1	0

Source: ICC
Rules for classification: 1) Points; 2) Goal difference; 3) Goals scored

=== Singapore ===
Pos	Team	Pld	W	WPEN	LPEN	L	GF	GA	GD	Pts	Final result
1	(Italy) Inter Milan	2	2	0	0	0	4	1	+3	6	2017 ICC Singapore Champions
2	(Germany) Bayern Munich	2	1	0	0	1	3	4	−1	3	
3	(England) Chelsea	2	0	0	0	2	3	5	−2	0	

Source: ICC
Rules for classification: 1) Points; 2) Goal difference; 3) Goals scored

=== United States ===
Pos	Team	Pld	W	WPEN	LPEN	L	GF	GA	GD	Pts	Final result
1	(Spain) Barcelona	3	3	0	0	0	6	3	+3	9	2017 ICC United States Champions
2	(England) Manchester City	3	2	0	0	1	7	3	+4	6	
3	(Italy) Roma	3	1	0	2	0	5	4	+1	5	
4	(England) Manchester United	3	1	1	0	1	3	2	+1	5	
5	(Italy) Juventus	3	1	1	0	1	5	5	0	5	
6	(England) Tottenham Hotspur	3	1	0	0	2	6	8	−2	3	
7	(France) Paris Saint-Germain	3	0	1	0	2	5	8	−3	2	
8	(Spain) Real Madrid	3	0	0	1	2	4	8	−4	1	

Source: ICC
Rules for classification: 1) Points; 2) Goal difference; 3) Goals scored
