= International Champions Cup =

Annual club association football exhibition competition

- Founded: 2013
- Abolished: 2020; 6 years ago
- Teams: 8 – 18 (depending on the year)
- Last champions: (Portugal) Benfica (2019; 1st title)
- Most championships: (Spain) Real Madrid (3 titles)
- Website: internationalchampionscup.com

The International Champions Cup (ICC) was an annual club association football (soccer) exhibition competition staged from 2013 to 2019. COVID-19 resulted in the 2020 edition being cancelled. The tournament was later abolished, but the Women's International Champions Cup has continued to play in 2021 and 2022.

== Format ==
The format has changed in each competition. Subsequent tournaments have had different numbers of teams in the three locations.

In the 2013 iteration, the participants were designated as part an "Eastern" and a "Western" group based on the location of their group stage matches. The groups were not played as a round-robin; rather, the winners of the first-round matches played each other in the second round, and the first-round losers also played each other in the second round. The two teams with two wins from the first two matches advanced to the final. The other three teams of each group were then ranked based on their records in the two matches played, with a game won in regulation time counting for two points and a game won on a deciding penalty shootout (no tied games were permitted) counting for one, with traditional methods of ranking – goal difference, goals scored, etc – determining order in case of two teams having the same points total. After the teams in each group had been ranked, they were paired against their opposite number from the other group, second playing second, third playing third, fourth playing fourth, with the results of these final matches determining a definitive placing for each team, from first place to eighth.

In the 2014 season, this slightly awkward system was done away with, the teams separating into non-geographical groups and playing a round-robin format with one game played against each other team in their group. After each team has played three games, the top-placed team from each group contested a final to determine the overall winner.

Starting with the 2015 season, the tournament was separated into three geographic editions with a winner crowned for each region based on points total. The 2015 and 2016 tournaments held editions in North America and Europe, Australia, and China. The Australia and China tournaments were contested as three-team round-robin competitions (Real Madrid participated in both), and the North America and Europe edition featured ten teams (including three US-based MLS teams) which played four matches each. The 2016 season retained the same format and regions, with Melbourne Victory of the A-League joining as the fourth team in the Australia region. In the 2017 iteration, Singapore replaced Australia as one of the three regions.

In 2018, all 18 participating teams contested the tournament as part of a single table, with each team playing three matches and the champion crowned based on points total. Matches were held across 15 venues in the United States, 7 in Europe, and 1 in Singapore.

For the 2019 edition, 12 teams participated in the tournament. Guadalajara took place in this tournament, being the only non-European team participating. Games were played across 17 cities in the United States, Europe, Singapore and China.

== History ==
The ICC is owned and operated by Relevent Sports Group, founded by RSE ventures based out of northern New Jersey, a sports venture firm founded in 2012 by billionaire real estate magnate and Miami Dolphins owner Stephen Ross and Matt Higgins, a former executive with the New York Jets and international soccer executive Charlie Stillitano. It replaced the World Football Challenge, which had featured a more even distribution of European- and American-based sides. Daniel Sillman is the chief executive officer of Relevent Sports Group and during his tenure, Relevent Sports Group launched the Women's International Champions Cup Tournament and International Champions Cup Futures Tournament.

During the 2014 tournament, a match between Manchester United and Real Madrid at Michigan Stadium in Ann Arbor, Michigan set the all-time record for attendance at a soccer game in the United States with 109,318 spectators. In 2017, Real Madrid and Barcelona played in the second El Clásico held outside of Spain.

In 2018, the ICC Futures tournament began with 24 teams including 8 academies from Europe, 8 MLS Academies, and 8 US based state all-star teams. Bayern Munich topped Chelsea to win the first ICC Futures trophy.

The Women's International Champions Cup was established in 2018.

=== 2020 cancellation and future ===
Shutdowns and restrictions related to the COVID-19 pandemic caused the cancelation of the 2020 edition, and the tournament has not returned. An open letter from the organization's CEO had stated that the men's tournament planned to return in 2022 in the United States and Asia. The 2022 men's edition did not materialize. However, a women's edition was held in United States in 2022.

== Sponsors ==
The trophy was created by silversmiths Thomas Lyte in partnership with EPICO Studios.

For the first two years (2013–2014), Guinness signed on to be the title sponsor for the entire tournament which, at that time, was only in North America.

For the 2015 competition, there was no overall sponsor, rather there was a unique Presenting Sponsor for each regional tournament. The North American tournament was presented by Guinness, whereas the Australian tournament was presented by Audi. Heineken became the presenting sponsor of the tournament from 2016 onward. UnionPay became the sponsor of the tournament for the Singapore leg since 2018.

== Results by year ==
=== Regional editions (2013–2017) ===
Edition	Teams	North America and Europe (Note: 2014 and 2017 editions were not played in Europe.)		Australia		China		Singapore	
Edition	Teams	Winner	Runner-up	Winner	Runner-up	Winner	Runner-up	Winner	Runner-up
2013	8	(Spain) Real Madrid	(England) Chelsea	not held		not held		not held	
2014	8	(England) Manchester United	(England) Liverpool	not held		not held		not held	
2015	15	(France) Paris Saint-Germain	(United States) New York Red Bulls	(Spain) Real Madrid	(Italy) Roma	(Spain) Real Madrid	(Italy) Milan	not held	
2016	17	(France) Paris Saint-Germain	(England) Liverpool	(Italy) Juventus	(Spain) Atlético Madrid	uncrowned – match canceled		not held	
2017	15	(Spain) Barcelona	(England) Manchester City	not held		uncrowned (Note: Because Borussia Dortmund, Inter Milan, Arsenal and Lyon played once, while Milan and Bayern Munich played twice.)		(Italy) Inter Milan	(Germany) Bayern Munich

=== Worldwide (2018–2020) ===
Edition	Teams	Winner	Runner-up
2018	18	(England) Tottenham Hotspur	(Germany) Borussia Dortmund
2019	12	(Portugal) Benfica	(Spain) Atlético Madrid
2020	Canceled due to the COVID-19 pandemic		

== Top goalscorers by year ==
=== 2013 ===
Rank	Name	Team	Goals
1	(Portugal) Cristiano Ronaldo	(Spain) Real Madrid	3
2	(Spain) Jonathan Viera	(Spain) Valencia	2
2	(France) Karim Benzema	(Spain) Real Madrid	2

=== 2014 ===
Rank	Name	Team	Goals
1	(Montenegro) Stevan Jovetić	(England) Manchester City	5
2	(England) Wayne Rooney	(England) Manchester United	3
2	(Greece) Dimitrios Diamantakos	(Greece) Olympiacos	3
4	(Wales) Gareth Bale	(Spain) Real Madrid	2
4	(England) Ashley Young	(England) Manchester United	2
4	(Spain) Juan Mata	(England) Manchester United	2
4	(England) Raheem Sterling	(England) Liverpool	2
4	(Italy) Francesco Totti	(Italy) Roma	2

=== 2015 ===
Rank	Name	Team	Goals
1	(Sweden) Zlatan Ibrahimović	(France) Paris Saint-Germain	3
1	(France) Jean-Kévin Augustin	(France) Paris Saint-Germain	3
1	(Uruguay) Luis Suárez	(Spain) Barcelona	3
4	(Belgium) Eden Hazard	(England) Chelsea	2
4	(France) Blaise Matuidi	(France) Paris Saint-Germain	2
4	(United States) Sean Davis	(United States) New York Red Bulls	2
4	(Italy) Federico Bernardeschi	(Italy) Fiorentina	2

Note: Goals from the Worldwide edition are not included.

== Results by clubs ==
Performances
Club	Titles	Runner-up	Seasons won	Seasons runner-up
(Spain) Real Madrid	3	0	2013, 2015 (Note: In two editions (Australia and China).)	—
(France) Paris Saint-Germain	2	0	2015, 2016	—
(England) Manchester United	1	0	2014	—
(Italy) Juventus	1	0	2016	—
(Spain) FC Barcelona	1	0	2017	—
(Italy) Inter Milan	1	0	2017	—
(England) Tottenham Hotspur	1	0	2018	—
(Portugal) Benfica	1	0	2019	—
(England) Liverpool	0	2	—	2014, 2016
(Spain) Atlético Madrid	0	2	—	2016, 2019
(England) Chelsea	0	1	—	2013
(Italy) A.C. Milan	0	1	—	2015
(United States) New York Red Bulls	0	1	—	2015
(Italy) Roma	0	1	—	2015
(Germany) Bayern Munich	0	1	—	2017
(England) Manchester City	0	1	—	2017
(Germany) Borussia Dortmund	0	1	—	2018

== Results by countries ==
Performances
Nation	Titles	Runners-up	Total
Spain	4	2	6
England	2	4	6
Italy	2	2	4
France	2	0	2
Portugal	1	0	1
Germany	0	2	2
United States	0	1	1

== See also ==
- Women's International Champions Cup
