= 2016 International Champions Cup =

Series of association football friendly tournaments in 2016

Tournament details
- Host country: Australia; China; England; Republic of Ireland; Scotland; Sweden; United States
- Dates: July 22 – August 13
- Teams: 17 (from 2 confederations)
- Venues: 19 (in 19 host cities)

Final positions
- Champions: Australia: (Italy) Juventus (1st title); China: None; United States and Europe: (France) Paris Saint-Germain (2nd title)

Tournament statistics
- Matches played: 20
- Goals scored: 67 (3.35 per match)
- Attendance: 963,900 (48,195 per match)
- Top scorer(s): (United States) Julian Green (Brazil) Marcelo (Spain) Munir (France) Franck Ribéry (3 goals each)

The 2016 International Champions Cup (or ICC) was a series of friendly association football tournaments that began on 22 July and ended on 13 August 2016.

In December 2015, Juventus, Tottenham Hotspur and Melbourne Victory were confirmed to play in the Australian version of the tournament. Atlético Madrid were confirmed as the fourth team on 1 March. Melbourne Victory was the first team from the Asian Football Confederation to compete in the International Champions Cup.

On 5 February 2016, Manchester City was announced as a competing team once again, this time in the China edition. They were joined by Manchester United and Borussia Dortmund on 23 March 2016. Borussia Dortmund topped the table of this edition but as the match between Manchester City and Manchester United was cancelled no trophy was awarded.

The American dates were reported in March 2016 as featuring Barcelona, Bayern Munich, Celtic, Chelsea, Liverpool, Inter Milan, Milan, Real Madrid, Leicester City, and Paris Saint-Germain.

== Teams ==
Australia

Nation	Team	Location	League
Australia	Melbourne Victory	Melbourne	A-League
England	Tottenham Hotspur	London	Premier League
Italy	Juventus	Turin	Serie A
Spain	Atlético Madrid	Madrid	La Liga

China

Nation	Team	Location	League
England	Manchester City	Manchester	Premier League
England	Manchester United	Manchester	Premier League
Germany	Borussia Dortmund	Dortmund	Bundesliga

United States and Europe

Nation	Team	Location	League
England	Chelsea	London	Premier League
England	Leicester City	Leicester	Premier League
England	Liverpool	Liverpool	Premier League
France	Paris Saint-Germain	Paris	Ligue 1
Germany	Bayern Munich	Munich	Bundesliga
Italy	Inter Milan	Milan	Serie A
Italy	Milan	Milan	Serie A
Scotland	Celtic	Glasgow	Scottish Premiership
Spain	Barcelona	Barcelona	La Liga
Spain	Real Madrid	Madrid	La Liga

== Venues ==
Australia

Melbourne	2016 International Champions Cup is located in Australia
Melbourne Cricket Ground	2016 International Champions Cup is located in Australia
37°49′12″S 144°59′0″E	2016 International Champions Cup is located in Australia
Capacity: 100,024	2016 International Champions Cup is located in Australia

China

Beijing	Shenzhen	Shanghai	2016 International Champions Cup is located in China
National Stadium	Longgang Stadium	Shanghai Stadium	2016 International Champions Cup is located in China
39°59′30″N 116°23′26″E	22°41′49.70″N 114°12′43.90″E	31°11′0.61″N 121°26′14.28″E	2016 International Champions Cup is located in China
Capacity: 91,000	Capacity: 60,334	Capacity: 56,842	2016 International Champions Cup is located in China

United States

Ann Arbor	Columbus	Pasadena	East Rutherford
Michigan Stadium	Ohio Stadium	Rose Bowl	MetLife Stadium
47°35′42.72″N 122°19′53.76″W	40°0′6″N 83°1′11″W	34°9′41″N 118°10′3″W	40°44′12″N 74°9′1″W
Capacity: 107,601	Capacity: 104,944	Capacity: 92,542	Capacity: 82,566
Charlotte	2016 International Champions Cup is located in the United States		Santa Clara
Bank of America Stadium	2016 International Champions Cup is located in the United States		Levi's Stadium
35°13′33″N 80°51′10″W	2016 International Champions Cup is located in the United States		37°24′10.8″N 121°58′12″W
Capacity: 74,455	2016 International Champions Cup is located in the United States		Capacity: 68,500
Minneapolis	Chicago	Eugene	Carson
U.S. Bank Stadium	Soldier Field	Autzen Stadium	StubHub Center
44°58′26″N 93°15′28″W	41°51′45″N 87°37′0″W	44°3′30″N 123°4′7″W	33°51′52″N 118°15′40″W
Capacity: 66,792	Capacity: 61,500	Capacity: 59,000	Capacity: 27,000

Europe

London	Glasgow	Dublin	Solna	Limerick
Wembley Stadium	Celtic Park	Aviva Stadium	Friends Arena	Thomond Park
51°33′21″N 0°16′47″W	55°50′58.96″N 4°12′20.12″W	53°20′6.5″N 6°13′42.0″W	59°22′21″N 18°00′00″E	52°40′27″N 8°38′33″W
Capacity: 90,000	Capacity: 60,411	Capacity: 51,700	Capacity: 50,653	Capacity: 25,630
2016 International Champions Cup is located in Europe

== Matches ==
=== Australia ===
23 July 2016
19:00 AEST

Melbourne Victory (Australia)	1–1	(Italy) Juventus
Ingham 83'	Report	Blanco 58'
Penalties
Valeri (penalty missed); Ingham (penalty scored); Baró (penalty scored); Galloway (penalty scored); Pasquali (penalty scored)	4–3	(penalty scored) Marrone; (penalty scored) Vitale; (penalty missed) Macek; (penalty scored) Rosseti; (penalty missed) Padovan

Melbourne Cricket Ground, Melbourne
Attendance: 23,174
Referee: Hiroyuki Kimura (Japan)

26 July 2016
20:00 AEST

Juventus (Italy)	2–1	(England) Tottenham Hotspur
Dybala 6'; Benatia 14'	Report	Lamela 67'

Melbourne Cricket Ground, Melbourne
Attendance: 31,447
Referee: Ben Williams (Australia)

29 July 2016
20:00 AEST

Tottenham Hotspur (England)	0–1	(Spain) Atlético Madrid
	Report	Godín 40'

Melbourne Cricket Ground, Melbourne
Attendance: 42,107
Referee: Chris Beath (Australia)

=== China ===
22 July 2016
20:00 CST

Manchester United (England)	1–4	(Germany) Borussia Dortmund
Mkhitaryan 59'	Report	Castro 19', 86'; Aubameyang 36' (pen.); Dembélé 57'

Shanghai Stadium, Shanghai
Attendance: 38,285
Referee: Wang Di (China)

25 July 2016
19:30 CST

Manchester City (England)	Cancelled (Note: The match was cancelled due to adverse weather and poor pitch conditions.)	(England) Manchester United
	Report

Beijing National Stadium, Beijing
Referee: Ma Ning (China)

28 July 2016
19:30 CST

Borussia Dortmund (Germany)	1–1	(England) Manchester City
Pulisic 90+6'	Report	Agüero 79'
Penalties
Passlack (penalty missed); Kagawa (penalty scored); Castro (penalty scored); Burnić (penalty scored); Pulisic (penalty scored); Hober (penalty scored); Bruun Larsen (penalty missed); Merino (penalty missed)	5–6	(penalty missed) García; (penalty scored) Adarabioyo; (penalty scored) Fernandinho; (penalty scored) Silva; (penalty scored) Agüero; (penalty scored) Nolito; (penalty missed) Sterling; (penalty scored) Angeliño

Longgang Stadium, Shenzhen
Attendance: 32,008
Referee: Fu Ming (China)

=== United States and Europe ===
23 July 2016
17:30 BST

Celtic (Scotland)	1–1	(England) Leicester City
O'Connell 59'	Report	Mahrez 46'
Penalties
Çiftçi (penalty scored); Johansen (penalty scored); Allan (penalty scored); O'Connell (penalty scored); Christie (penalty scored); Forrest (penalty missed)	5–6	(penalty scored) Fuchs; (penalty scored) Wasilewski; (penalty scored) Drinkwater; (penalty scored) Chilwell; (penalty scored) Okazaki; (penalty scored) Amartey

Celtic Park, Glasgow
Attendance: 32,658
Referee: John Beaton (Scotland)

24 July 2016
14:00 PDT

Inter Milan (Italy)	1–3	(France) Paris Saint-Germain
Jovetić 45+3' (pen.)	Report	Aurier 14', 87'; Kurzawa 61'

Autzen Stadium, Eugene
Attendance: 24,147
Referee: Jair Marrufo (United States)

27 July 2016
19:30 EDT

Real Madrid (Spain)	1–3	(France) Paris Saint-Germain
Marcelo 44' (pen.)	Report	Ikoné 2'; Meunier 35', 40'

Ohio Stadium, Columbus
Attendance: 86,641
Referee: Hilario Grajeda (United States)

27 July 2016
20:00 CDT
Audi Football Summit

Bayern Munich (Germany)	3–3	(Italy) Milan
Ribéry 29', 90' (pen.); Alaba 38'	Report	Niang 23'; Bertolacci 49'; Kucka 61'
Penalties
Lahm (penalty scored); Alaba (penalty scored); Bernat (penalty scored); Rafinha (penalty missed)	3–5	(penalty scored) Honda; (penalty scored) Matri; (penalty scored) Kucka; (penalty scored) Romagnoli; (penalty scored) Bonaventura

Soldier Field, Chicago
Attendance: 44,826
Referee: Mark Geiger (United States)

27 July 2016
20:00 PDT

Chelsea (England)	1–0	(England) Liverpool
Cahill 10'	Report

Rose Bowl, Pasadena
Attendance: 53,117
Referee: Baldomero Toledo (United States)

30 July 2016
18:00 IST

Barcelona (Spain)	3–1	(Scotland) Celtic
Turan 11'; Ambrose 31' (o.g.); Munir 41'	Report	Griffiths 29'

Aviva Stadium, Dublin
Attendance: 47,900
Referee: Neil Doyle (Republic of Ireland)

30 July 2016
15:00 EDT

Real Madrid (Spain)	3–2	(England) Chelsea
Marcelo 19', 26'; Mariano 37'	Report	Hazard 80', 90+1'

Michigan Stadium, Ann Arbor
Attendance: 105,826
Referee: Younes Marrakchi (United States)

30 July 2016
17:00 EDT

Inter Milan (Italy)	1–4	(Germany) Bayern Munich
Icardi 90'	Report	Green 7', 30', 35'; Ribéry 13'

Bank of America Stadium, Charlotte
Attendance: 53,629
Referee: Mark Kadlecik (United States)

30 July 2016
19:00 PDT

Liverpool (England)	2–0	(Italy) Milan
Origi 59'; Firmino 73'	Report

Levi's Stadium, Santa Clara
Attendance: 30,758
Referee: Kevin Stott (United States)

30 July 2016
20:30 PDT

Paris Saint-Germain (France)	4–0	(England) Leicester City
Cavani 26' (pen.); Ikoné 45'; Lucas 64'; Édouard 90'	Report

StubHub Center, Carson
Attendance: 25,667
Referee: Ismail Elfath (United States)

3 August 2016
20:00 CEST

Barcelona (Spain)	4–2	(England) Leicester City
Munir 26', 45'; L. Suárez 34'; Mújica 84'	Report	Musa 47', 66'

Friends Arena, Solna
Attendance: 42,879
Referee: Martin Strömbergsson (Sweden)

3 August 2016
19:30 EDT
Audi Football Summit

Bayern Munich (Germany)	0–1	(Spain) Real Madrid
	Report	Danilo 79'

MetLife Stadium, East Rutherford
Attendance: 82,012
Referee: Jaime Herrera (United States)

3 August 2016
20:00 CDT

Milan (Italy)	1–3	(England) Chelsea
Bonaventura 38'	Report	Traoré 24'; Oscar 70' (pen.), 87'

U.S. Bank Stadium, Minneapolis
Attendance: 64,101
Referee: Edvin Jurisevic (United States)

6 August 2016
17:15 BST

Liverpool (England)	4–0	(Spain) Barcelona
Mané 15'; Mascherano 47' (o.g.); Origi 48'; Grujić 90+3'	Report

Wembley Stadium, London
Attendance: 89,845
Referee: Martin Atkinson (England)

13 August 2016
19:00 IST

Inter Milan (Italy)	2–0	(Scotland) Celtic
Éder 45+1'; Candreva 71'	Report

Thomond Park, Limerick
Attendance: 12,873
Referee: Paul McLaughlin (Republic of Ireland)

== Tables ==
=== Australia ===
Pos	Team	Pld	W	WP	LP	L	GF	GA	GD	Pts	Final result
1	(Italy) Juventus	2	1	0	1	0	3	2	+1	4	2016 ICC Australia Champions
2	(Spain) Atlético Madrid	1	1	0	0	0	1	0	+1	3	
3	(Australia) Melbourne Victory	1	0	1	0	0	1	1	0	2	
4	(England) Tottenham Hotspur	2	0	0	0	2	1	3	−2	0	

Source: ICC
Rules for classification: 1) Points; 2) Goal difference; 3) Goals scored

=== China ===
Since a match was cancelled, no champion was declared.

Pos	Team	Pld	W	WP	LP	L	GF	GA	GD	Pts
1	(Germany) Borussia Dortmund	2	1	0	1	0	5	2	+3	4
2	(England) Manchester City	1	0	1	0	0	1	1	0	2
3	(England) Manchester United	1	0	0	0	1	1	4	−3	0

Source: ICC
Rules for classification: 1) Points; 2) Goal difference; 3) Goals scored

=== United States and Europe ===
Pos	Team	Pld	W	WP	LP	L	GF	GA	GD	Pts	Final result
1	(France) Paris Saint-Germain	3	3	0	0	0	10	2	+8	9	2016 ICC United States and Europe Champions
2	(England) Liverpool	3	2	0	0	1	6	1	+5	6	
3	(England) Chelsea	3	2	0	0	1	6	4	+2	6	
4	(Spain) Barcelona	3	2	0	0	1	7	7	0	6	
5	(Spain) Real Madrid	3	2	0	0	1	5	5	0	6	
6	(Germany) Bayern Munich	3	1	0	1	1	7	5	+2	4	
7	(Italy) Inter Milan	3	1	0	0	2	4	7	−3	3	
8	(Italy) Milan	3	0	1	0	2	4	8	−4	2	
9	(England) Leicester City	3	0	1	0	2	3	9	−6	2	
10	(Scotland) Celtic	3	0	0	1	2	2	6	−4	1	

Source: ICC
Rules for classification: 1) Points; 2) Goal difference; 3) Goals scored

== Media coverage ==
Market	Countries	Broadcast partner	Ref.
Albania; Kosovo	2	TRING TV	
Argentina	1	Canal de la Ciudad, TyC Sports	
Australia	1	Nine Network, Optus Sport	
Bosnia and Herzegovina; Croatia; Macedonia; Montenegro; Serbia	5	Arena Sport	
Belarus	1	Belarus TV	
Belgium	1	Belgacom	
Bolivia; Paraguay	2	Tigo Sports	
Brazil	1	Esporte Interativo	
Bulgaria	1	RING.BG	
Burma	1	Sky Net	
Canada	1	TSN	
Central America	6	ESPN	
China	1	LeTV + regional channels	
Colombia	1	RCN	
Cyprus	1	Cyta	
Czech Republic; Latvia; Lithuania	3	Setanta	
Dominican Republic	1	ESPN	
Estonia	1	ETV 4 Sport	
Eurasia	10	Setanta	
France	1	beIN Sports	
Germany; Switzerland; Austria	3	Sport 1 (16+ matches)	
Greece	1	Nova Sports	
Hong Kong	1	i-Cable	
Iceland	1	365 Media	
Indonesia	2	Global TV, Super Soccer TV	
Israel	1	Charlton	
Italy	1	Mediaset Premium	
India	1	Sony ESPN	
Japan	1	J Sports	
Macau	1	Macau Cable	
Malaysia	1	Telekom Malaysia	
Mexico	1	ESPN	
Malta	1	Go	
Mongolia	1	Monnar Online Channel /ICC China/	
Middle East and North Africa	22	beIN Sports	
Netherlands	1	Eredivisie	
New Zealand	1	VDR (3 Aus. matches only)	
Norway	1	MAX, Eurosport 2	
Philippines	1	Perform	
Poland	1	Eleven Sports Network	
Portugal	1	Sport TV	
Hungary; Romania; Moldova	3	RDS	
Russia	1	VGTRK	
Scandinavia; Finland	4	SBS Discovery	
Singapore	1	StarHub	
Slovakia	1	TV Dajto	
Slovenia	1	Šport TV	
South America (excl. Brazil)	9	ESPN, DirecTV	
SouthAsia	6	SonyEspn	
South Korea	1	JTBC3 Fox sports	
Spain	1	Atresmedia, Canal+ Liga, TV3	
Sub Saharan Africa	49	StarTimes	
Taiwan	1	Sportcast	
Turkey	1	Dogan Group	
Thailand	1	PPTV	
United Kingdom; Republic of Ireland	5	Chelsea TV (Chelsea games only); LFC TV (Liverpool games only); MUTV (Manchester United games only); Sky Sports (every game except those including Chelsea and Manchester United.)	
United States; Puerto Rico; U.S. Virgin Islands; Caribbean; Falkland Islands	27	ESPN (English), ESPN Deportes (Spanish)	
Vietnam	1	SCTV	
