= Andrea De Vito =

Italian professional footballer (born 1991)

Personal information
- Date of birth: 27 November 1991 (age 34)
- Place of birth: Pavia, Italy
- Height: 1.80 m (5 ft 11 in)
- Position: Left-back

Youth career
- Sant'Alessio
- 2002–2011: Milan

Senior career*
Years	Team	Apps	(Gls)
2010–2011	Milan	1	(0)
2011–2013	Cittadella	20	(0)
2013–2014	Avellino	5	(0)
2014–2015	Varese	22	(0)
2015–2017	Messina	64	(0)
2017–2018	Siracusa	12	(0)
2018–2019	Viterbese	30	(0)
2019	Rieti	11	(0)
2019–2021	Fano	28	(0)
2021	Cavese	5	(0)
2021–2022	Cattolica	23	(0)
2022	Grosseto	0	(0)
2022–2023	Imolese	23	(0)
- * Club domestic league appearances and goals as of 23 April 2023

Andrea De Vito (born 27 November 1991) is an Italian professional footballer who plays as a defender.

== Club career ==
Born to parents from Montepaone, province of Catanzaro, Calabria, De Vito started playing football for amateur side Sant'Alessio, before joining Milan in 2002. In the 2009–10 season, he was a member of the under-20 squad who won the Coppa Italia Primavera, 25 years after the club's last success in the competition.

De Vito made his professional debut in a Coppa Italia game against Novara, on 13 January 2010. Three months later, on 24 April, he also made his Serie A debut, in an away game versus Palermo.

On 25 June 2011, Andrea De Vito was confirmed to have signed a deal with Lega Pro Prima Divisione club Foggia. But in July 2011 he left for Serie B club Cittadella in co-ownership deal.

On 31 January 2019, he signed with Rieti.

On 8 August 2019, he joined Fano on a 2-year contract.

On 15 January 2021, he moved to Cavese.
