= 2013 International Champions Cup =

Tournament details
- Host countries: Spain; United States
- Dates: July 27 – August 7
- Teams: 8 (from 2 confederations)
- Venues: 7 (in 7 host cities)

Final positions
- Champions: (Spain) Real Madrid (1st title)
- Runners-up: (England) Chelsea
- Third place: (Italy) Milan
- Fourth place: (United States) LA Galaxy

Tournament statistics
- Matches played: 12
- Goals scored: 33 (2.75 per match)
- Attendance: 492,575 (41,048 per match)
- Top scorer: (Portugal) Cristiano Ronaldo (3 goals)
- Best player: (Portugal) Cristiano Ronaldo

The 2013 International Champions Cup (or ICC) was an exhibition association football tournament played in Spain and the United States. It began on Saturday, July 27 and culminated on Wednesday, August 7, 2013. This tournament replaced the World Football Challenge and was staged mainly throughout the United States, and with one match in Spain. The participating teams were LA Galaxy of the United States, Real Madrid and Valencia of Spain, Milan, Juventus and Inter Milan of Italy, and Chelsea and Everton of England. In the United States, Fox Soccer televised 11 of 12 matches live, and Fox Sports broadcast one match live on August 3. ESPN Deportes televised all matches live on TV and on WatchESPN in Spanish.

Real Madrid won the tournament, defeating Chelsea 3–1 in the final.

== Teams ==
| Country | Team | Location | Confederation | League |
|---|---|---|---|---|
| England | Chelsea | London | UEFA | Premier League |
| England | Everton | Liverpool | UEFA | Premier League |
| Italy | Milan | Milan | UEFA | Serie A |
| Italy | Inter Milan | Milan | UEFA | Serie A |
| Italy | Juventus | Turin | UEFA | Serie A |
| Spain | Real Madrid | Madrid | UEFA | La Liga |
| Spain | Valencia | Valencia | UEFA | La Liga |
| United States | LA Galaxy | Los Angeles | CONCACAF | Major League Soccer |

== Venues ==
Spain

| Valencia | Location of the host city of the 2013 International Champions Cup in Spain. |
| Estadio de Mestalla | Location of the host city of the 2013 International Champions Cup in Spain. |
| 39°28′28.76″N 0°21′30.10″W | Location of the host city of the 2013 International Champions Cup in Spain. |
| Capacity: 49,430 | Location of the host city of the 2013 International Champions Cup in Spain. |

United States

| San Francisco | Los Angeles | Glendale |
|---|---|---|
| AT&T Park | Dodger Stadium | University of Phoenix Stadium |
| 37°46′43″N 122°23′21″W | 34°4′25″N 118°14′24″W | 33°31′39″N 112°15′45″W |
| Capacity: 41,915 | Capacity: 56,000 | Capacity: 63,400 |
Location of the host cities of the 2013 International Champions Cup in the United States.
| Indianapolis | Miami Gardens | East Rutherford |
| Lucas Oil Stadium | Sun Life Stadium | MetLife Stadium |
| 39°45′36.2″N 86°9′49.7″W | 25°57′29″N 80°14′20″W | 40°48′49″N 74°4′28″W |
| Capacity: 63,000 | Capacity: 75,000 | Capacity: 82,500 |

== Format ==
The tournament had two groups of four: an "Eastern" and a "Western" group. The groups were not played as a round-robin; rather, the winners of the first round matches played each other in the second round, and the first round losers also played each other in the second round. The two teams with two wins from the first two matches advanced to the final. For the other teams, positions in the final round were determined by their position in their group, with the following rules:

- All matches tied at the end of regulation were decided by a penalty shoot-out.
- Three points were awarded for a regulation win, two points for a penalty shoot-out win, one point for a penalty shoot-out loss, and no points for a regulation loss.
- Tiebreakers were: head-to-head, goal difference, number of goals scored.

In other words, though the team placing first (two wins) in each group would be apparent, the determination of second, third (both teams: one win, one loss) and fourth place (two losses) was based on the above tiebreakers.

== Bracket ==
Seventh place match
(Italy) Juventus | 1 (8)
(Italy) Inter Milan (p) | 1 (9)
Fifth place match
(England) Everton | 0
(Spain) Valencia | 1

Second round (First round losers)
(Italy) Juventus | 1
(United States) LA Galaxy | 3
(Spain) Valencia | 4
(Italy) Inter Milan | 0

First round
(Italy) Juventus | 1 (5)
(England) Everton (p) | 1 (6)
(Spain) Real Madrid | 3
(United States) LA Galaxy | 1
(Italy) Milan | 2
(Spain) Valencia | 1
(England) Chelsea | 2
(Italy) Inter Milan | 0

Second round (First round winners)
(England) Everton | 1
(Spain) Real Madrid | 2
(Italy) Milan | 0
(England) Chelsea | 2

Final
(Spain) Real Madrid | 3
(England) Chelsea | 1
Third place match
(United States) LA Galaxy | 0
(Italy) Milan | 2

== Western Group ==
=== Standings ===
| Pos | Team | Pld | W | PW | PL | L | GF | GA | GD | Pts | Final result |
|---|---|---|---|---|---|---|---|---|---|---|---|
| 1 | (Spain) Real Madrid | 2 | 2 | 0 | 0 | 0 | 5 | 2 | +3 | 6 | Final |
| 2 | (United States) LA Galaxy | 2 | 1 | 0 | 0 | 1 | 4 | 4 | 0 | 3 | Third place match |
| 3 | (England) Everton | 2 | 0 | 1 | 0 | 1 | 2 | 3 | −1 | 2 | Fifth place match |
| 4 | (Italy) Juventus | 2 | 0 | 0 | 1 | 1 | 2 | 4 | −2 | 1 | Seventh place match |

=== Matches ===
First round

July 31, 2013
20:00 PDT (UTC−07:00)

| Juventus (Italy) | 1–1 | (England) Everton |
|---|---|---|
| Asamoah 80' | Report | Mirallas 61' |
Penalties
| Matri (penalty scored); Asamoah (penalty scored); Vučinić (penalty scored); Vidal (penalty scored); Pirlo (penalty missed); Motta (penalty scored); Peluso (penalty missed) | 5–6 | (penalty missed) Osman; (penalty scored) Barkley; (penalty scored) Mirallas; (penalty scored) Jagielka; (penalty scored) Oviedo; (penalty scored) Stones; (penalty scored) Coleman |

AT&T Park, San Francisco
Attendance: 22,208
Referee: Ricardo Salazar (United States)
August 1, 2013
19:30 MST (UTC−07:00)

| Real Madrid (Spain) | 3–1 | (United States) LA Galaxy |
|---|---|---|
| Di María 15'; Benzema 51', 74' | Report | Villarreal 63' |

University of Phoenix Stadium, Glendale
Attendance: 38,922
Referee: Juan Guzman (United States)

Second round (First round losers)

August 3, 2013
19:30 PDT (UTC−07:00)

| Juventus (Italy) | 1–3 | (United States) LA Galaxy |
|---|---|---|
| Matri 39' | Report | Gonzalez 36'; Donovan 60'; Keane 89' |

Dodger Stadium, Los Angeles
Attendance: 40,681
Referee: Baldomero Toledo (United States)

Second round (First round winners)

August 3, 2013
17:00 PDT (UTC−07:00)

| Everton (England) | 1–2 | (Spain) Real Madrid |
|---|---|---|
| Jelavić 61' | Report | Ronaldo 17'; Özil 31' |

Dodger Stadium, Los Angeles
Attendance: 40,681
Referee: Matthew Foerster (United States)

== Eastern Group ==
=== Standings ===
| Pos | Team | Pld | W | PW | PL | L | GF | GA | GD | Pts | Final result |
|---|---|---|---|---|---|---|---|---|---|---|---|
| 1 | (England) Chelsea | 2 | 2 | 0 | 0 | 0 | 4 | 0 | +4 | 6 | Final |
| 2 | (Italy) Milan | 2 | 1 | 0 | 0 | 1 | 2 | 3 | −1 | 3 | Third place match |
| 3 | (Spain) Valencia | 2 | 1 | 0 | 0 | 1 | 5 | 2 | +3 | 3 | Fifth place match |
| 4 | (Italy) Inter Milan | 2 | 0 | 0 | 0 | 2 | 0 | 6 | −6 | 0 | Seventh place match |

=== Matches ===
First round

July 27, 2013
17:00 CEST (UTC+02:00)

| Milan (Italy) | 2–1 | (Spain) Valencia |
|---|---|---|
| Robinho 22'; De Jong 38' | Report | Parejo 53' |

Estadio de Mestalla, Valencia
Attendance: 17,000
Referee: Carbonell Hernández (Spain)
August 1, 2013
20:00 EDT (UTC−04:00)

| Chelsea (England) | 2–0 | (Italy) Inter Milan |
|---|---|---|
| Oscar 13'; Hazard 29' (pen.) | Report |

Lucas Oil Stadium, Indianapolis
Attendance: 41,983
Referee: Ismail Elfath (United States)

Second round (First round losers)

August 4, 2013
16:00 EDT (UTC−04:00)

| Valencia (Spain) | 4–0 | (Italy) Inter Milan |
|---|---|---|
| Banega 7'; Viera 34', 90'; Jonas 56' | Report |

MetLife Stadium, East Rutherford
Attendance: 39,764
Referee: Mark Kadlecik (United States)

Second round (First round winners)

August 4, 2013
18:30 EDT (UTC−04:00)

| Milan (Italy) | 0–2 | (England) Chelsea |
|---|---|---|
| | Report | De Bruyne 29'; Schürrle 90+2' |

MetLife Stadium, East Rutherford
Attendance: 39,764
Referee: Jose Carlos Rivero (United States)

== Championship Round ==
=== Seventh place match ===
August 6, 2013
18:30 EDT (UTC−04:00)

| Juventus (Italy) | 1–1 | (Italy) Inter Milan |
|---|---|---|
| Vidal 45' (pen.) | Report | Álvarez 28' |
Penalties
| Giovinco (penalty missed); Marchisio (penalty scored); Llorente (penalty scored); Pirlo (penalty scored); Vidal (penalty scored); Ogbonna (penalty scored); Cáceres (penalty scored); Chiellini (penalty scored); De Ceglie (penalty scored); Isla (penalty missed) | 8–9 | (penalty missed) Guarín; (penalty scored) Ranocchia; (penalty scored) Álvarez; (penalty scored) Icardi; (penalty scored) Belfodil; (penalty scored) Olsen; (penalty scored) Andreolli; (penalty scored) Pereira; (penalty scored) Jonathan; (penalty scored) Carrizo |

Sun Life Stadium, Miami Gardens
Attendance: 38,513
Referee: Hilario Grajeda (United States)

=== Fifth place match ===
August 6, 2013
21:00 EDT (UTC−04:00)

| Everton (England) | 0–1 | (Spain) Valencia |
|---|---|---|
| | Report | Míchel 52' |

Sun Life Stadium, Miami Gardens
Attendance: 38,513
Referee: Allen Chapman (United States)

=== Third place match ===
August 7, 2013
18:30 EDT (UTC−04:00)

| LA Galaxy (United States) | 0–2 | (Italy) Milan |
|---|---|---|
| | Report | Balotelli 17'; Niang 40' |

Sun Life Stadium, Miami Gardens
Attendance: 67,273
Referee: Ted Unkel (United States)

=== Final ===
August 7, 2013
21:00 EDT (UTC−04:00)

| Real Madrid (Spain) | 3–1 | (England) Chelsea |
|---|---|---|
| Marcelo 14'; Ronaldo 31', 57' | Report | Ramires 17' |

Sun Life Stadium, Miami Gardens
Attendance: 67,273
Referee: Edvin Jurisevic (United States)

== Final ranking ==
| Rank | Team |
|---|---|
| 1st place, gold medalist(s) | (Spain) Real Madrid |
| 2nd place, silver medalist(s) | (England) Chelsea |
| 3rd place, bronze medalist(s) | (Italy) Milan |
| 4 | (United States) LA Galaxy |
| 5 | (Spain) Valencia |
| 6 | (England) Everton |
| 7 | (Italy) Inter Milan |
| 8 | (Italy) Juventus |

== Top goalscorers ==
| Rank | Name | Team | Goals |
|---|---|---|---|
| 1 | (Portugal) Cristiano Ronaldo | (Spain) Real Madrid | 3 |
| 2 | (France) Karim Benzema | (Spain) Real Madrid | 2 |
| 2 | (Spain) Jonathan Viera | (Spain) Valencia | 2 |
| 4 | 26 players | | 1 |

== Official song ==
The official song of the 2013 International Champions Cup "Exotic" was performed by the Indian Bollywood actress turned singer Priyanka Chopra, and was sung in both English and Hindi.

== See also ==
- World Football Challenge, an exhibition tournament for mid-season American clubs and pre-season European clubs that was held from 2009 until 2012
