= 2011 World Football Challenge =

Herbalife World Football Challenge 2011
- The 2011 World Football Challenge official logo

Tournament details
- Country: Canada; United States
- Venues: 14 (in 14 host cities)
- Teams: 13 (from 2 confederations)

Final positions
- Champions: (Spain) Real Madrid
- Runners-up: (England) Manchester United

Tournament statistics
- Matches played: 14
- Goals scored: 42 (3 per match)
- Attendance: 583,764 (41,697 per match)
- Top goal scorer(s): (Portugal) Cristiano Ronaldo (4 goals)

The 2011 World Football Challenge was the second World Football Challenge event, a series of friendly association football matches played in Canada and the United States in July and August.

== Participants ==
The 2011 tournament increased in scale from the 2009 incarnation, bringing in thirteen teams from seven countries. All the teams were either members of the UEFA or CONCACAF confederations. The field was highlighted by Spanish league and European champions Barcelona and English champion Manchester United. América was the only team that returned from the 2009 competition.

This tournament for the first time also included five teams from Major League Soccer, the top-flight league for the host countries, Canada and United States. As another first, there were games played outside the United States, at Empire Field in Vancouver, British Columbia and BMO Field in Toronto, Ontario (both in Canada).

North American clubs that competed in 2011 included Chicago Fire, Guadalajara, América, Los Angeles Galaxy, New England Revolution, Philadelphia Union, and Vancouver Whitecaps FC.

Four representatives from Europe's top leagues of England and Spain, all of whom won their country's blue ribbon competitions in the 2010–11 season joined the North American clubs, those being: Spanish and European champions Barcelona, FA Cup winners Manchester City, Premier League champions Manchester United and Copa del Rey winners Real Madrid.

Team	Location	Confederation	Professional League	Notes
Manchester United	Manchester	UEFA	Premier League	2010–11 Premier League champions
New England Revolution	Foxborough	CONCACAF	Major League Soccer	2010 North American SuperLiga runner-up
Real Madrid	Madrid	UEFA	La Liga	2010–11 Copa del Rey holders
Los Angeles Galaxy	Los Angeles	CONCACAF	Major League Soccer	2010 MLS Supporters' Shield holders
América	Mexico City	CONCACAF	Primera División	2011 Primera División de México Clausura Liguilla quarter-finalists
Manchester City	Manchester	UEFA	Premier League	2010–11 FA Cup holders
Vancouver Whitecaps FC	Vancouver	CONCACAF	Major League Soccer	2011 Canadian Championship runner-up
Guadalajara	Zapopan	CONCACAF	Primera División	2011 Primera División de México Clausura Liguilla semi-finalists
Chicago Fire	Chicago	CONCACAF	Major League Soccer	2009 North American SuperLiga runner-up
Philadelphia Union	Chester	CONCACAF	Major League Soccer	
Juventus	Turin	UEFA	Serie A	
Barcelona	Barcelona	UEFA	La Liga	2010–11 La Liga and 2010–11 UEFA Champions League winners
Sporting CP	Lisbon	UEFA	Primeira Liga	

== Venues ==
Canada

Vancouver, British Columbia	Toronto, Ontario	Location of the host cities of the 2011 World Football Challenge in Canada.
Empire Field	BMO Field	Location of the host cities of the 2011 World Football Challenge in Canada.
Capacity: 27,528	Capacity: 21,566	Location of the host cities of the 2011 World Football Challenge in Canada.

United States

Foxborough, Massachusetts	San Francisco, California	Los Angeles, California	San Diego, California	Chicago, Illinois
Gillette Stadium	AT&T Park	Los Angeles Memorial Coliseum	Qualcomm Stadium	Soldier Field
Capacity: 68,756	Capacity: 41,915	Capacity: 93,607	Capacity: 70,561	Capacity: 61,500
Philadelphia, Pennsylvania	Location of the host cities of the 2011 World Football Challenge in the United States.			Carson, California
Lincoln Financial Field	Location of the host cities of the 2011 World Football Challenge in the United States.			The Home Depot Center
Capacity: 69,144	Location of the host cities of the 2011 World Football Challenge in the United States.			Capacity: 27,000
New York, New York	Raleigh, North Carolina	Landover, Maryland	Miami Gardens, Florida	Arlington, Texas
Citi Field	Carter–Finley Stadium	FedExField	Sun Life Stadium	Cowboys Stadium
Capacity: 45,000	Capacity: 57,583	Capacity: 82,000	Capacity: 75,192	Capacity: 80,000

== Event rules ==
The event rules differed considerably from the 2009 event, due to differences in the number of teams.

=== Match rules ===
Match rules followed the Laws of the Game, with a few notable exceptions.

- In the event of a tie after the regulation 90 minutes, a penalty shootout immediately followed. These penalties did not accrue points in the table as a regulation goal or penalty would.
- Cautions and sending offs did not carry into the next competitive game, however, a player may have been suspended for their club's next WFC match.
- Teams had a roster of 25 players, and clubs were able to substitute eleven players during the course of the match rather than the standard three.

=== Table setup ===
The format was a single table, accruing points as follows:

- Three points for a regulation victory
- Two points for a penalty shootout victory
- One point for a penalty shootout loss
- No points for a regulation loss
- One point for each goal scored (up to three per match)

Sporting CP, who played only one game, did not accrue points, but their opponent, Juventus, were able to in their matchup. The five Major League Soccer teams were split up into two different "clubs" for the purposes of the table, the MLS Eastern Conference (containing the Chicago Fire, New England Revolution, and Philadelphia Union), and the MLS Western Conference (containing the Los Angeles Galaxy, who played two games, and the Vancouver Whitecaps FC). Each of the other seven clubs played three games and accrued points as normal.

=== Table tiebreakers ===
In the event of a tie in the final table standings, the following tiebreakers were used in order:

1. Regulation goal difference
2. Most goals for in regulation
3. Fewest goals against in regulation
4. Most goals scored in regulation in one match
5. Drawing of lots

== Standings ==
Pos	Team	Pld	W	PKW	PKL	L	GF	GA	GD	BP	Pts
1	(Spain) Real Madrid (C)	3	3	0	0	0	9	2	+7	8	17
2	(England) Manchester United	3	3	0	0	0	9	3	+6	8	17
3	(England) Manchester City	3	2	1	0	0	5	2	+3	5	13
4	(Italy) Juventus	3	2	0	0	1	3	2	+1	3	9
5	(Spain) Barcelona	3	1	0	0	2	4	6	−2	4	7
6	(Mexico) Guadalajara	3	1	0	0	2	4	5	−1	3	6
7	(United States) MLS Western (Note: MLS Western Conference composed of one game by the Vancouver Whitecaps and two games by the Los Angeles Galaxy)	3	0	0	1	2	3	7	−4	3	4
8	(United States) MLS Eastern (Note: MLS Eastern Conference composed of one game each by the New England Revolution, Philadelphia Union, and Chicago Fire)	3	0	0	0	3	3	9	−6	3	3
9	(Mexico) Club América	3	0	0	0	3	0	5	−5	0	0

Source: World Football Challenge Standings
Note: Sporting CP played only one game and did not accrue points.
(C) Champion

== Matches ==
All times are in the EDT time zone (UTC−4) (Local Times in parentheses).

July 13
20:00 (20:00 UTC−4)

New England Revolution (United States)	1–4	(England) Manchester United
Mansally 56'	Report	Owen 51'; Macheda 54', 61'; Park 80'

Gillette Stadium, Foxborough, Massachusetts
Attendance: 51,523
Referee: Mark Geiger

July 16
20:00 (17:00 UTC−7)

Club América (Mexico)	0–2	(England) Manchester City
	Report	McGivern 17'; Wright-Phillips 27'

AT&T Park, San Francisco, California
Attendance: 11,250
Referee: Hilario Grajeda

July 16
22:00 (19:00 UTC−7)

Los Angeles Galaxy (United States)	1–4	(Spain) Real Madrid
Cristman 67'	Report	Callejón 31'; Joselu 40'; Ronaldo 53'; Benzema 58'

Los Angeles Memorial Coliseum, Los Angeles, California
Attendance: 56,211
Referee: Jorge González

July 18
22:00 (19:00 UTC−7)

Vancouver Whitecaps FC (Canada)	1–2	(England) Manchester City
Sanvezzo 30'	Report	Guidetti 68'; Wright-Phillips 84'

Empire Field, Vancouver, British Columbia
Attendance: 24,074
Referee: Mauricio Navarro

July 20
23:00 (20:00 UTC−7)

Guadalajara (Mexico)	0–3	(Spain) Real Madrid
	Report	Ronaldo 73', 76' (pen.), 82'

Qualcomm Stadium, San Diego, California
Attendance: 38,211
Referee: Ricardo Salazar

July 23
17:00 (16:00 UTC−5)

Chicago Fire (United States)	1–3	(England) Manchester United
Gibbs 13'	Report	Rooney 66'; Rafael 75'; Nani 82'

Soldier Field, Chicago, Illinois
Attendance: 61,308
Referee: Terry Vaughn

July 23
19:00 (19:00 UTC−4)

Juventus (Italy)	1–2	(Portugal) Sporting CP
Del Piero 80'	Report	Djaló 13', 36'

BMO Field, Toronto, Ontario
Attendance: 10,028
Referee: Drew Fischer

July 23
21:00 (21:00 UTC−4)

Philadelphia Union (United States)	1–2	(Spain) Real Madrid
M. Farfan 80'	Report	Callejón 2'; Özil 11'

Lincoln Financial Field, Philadelphia, Pennsylvania
Attendance: 57,305
Referee: Alex Prus

July 24
16:00 (13:00 UTC−7)

Los Angeles Galaxy (United States)	1–1	(England) Manchester City
Magee 53'	Report	Balotelli 20' (pen.)
Penalties
Keat (penalty scored); Birchall (penalty scored); Juninho (penalty missed); Dunivant (penalty scored); Stephens (penalty scored); McBean (penalty missed); Gonzalez (penalty scored); McCarty (penalty scored); DeLaGarza (penalty missed)	6–7	(penalty scored) Milner; (penalty scored) Weiss; (penalty scored) Suárez; (penalty scored) Kolarov; (penalty missed) Guidetti; (penalty missed) Lescott; (penalty scored) De Jong; (penalty scored) Wright-Phillips; (penalty scored) Hart

The Home Depot Center, Carson, California
Attendance: 24,897
Referee: Ricardo Salazar

July 26
19:30 (19:30 UTC−4)

Juventus (Italy)	1–0	(Mexico) Club América
Pasquato 42'	Report

Citi Field, New York, New York
Attendance: 20,859
Referee: Jorge González

July 28
20:00 (20:00 UTC−4)

Juventus (Italy)	1–0	(Mexico) Guadalajara
Quagliarella 12'	Report

Carter–Finley Stadium, Raleigh, North Carolina
Attendance: 16,124
Referee: Mark Kadlecik

July 30
19:00 (19:00 UTC−4)

Barcelona (Spain)	1−2	(England) Manchester United
Thiago 70'	Report	Nani 22'; Owen 76'

FedExField, Landover, Maryland
Attendance: 81,807
Referee: Ricardo Salazar

August 3
20:00 (20:00 UTC−4)

Barcelona (Spain)	1–4	(Mexico) Guadalajara
Villa 3'	Report	Fabián 60', 63'; Casillas 72'; Verduzco 90+3'

Sun Life Stadium, Miami Gardens, Florida
Attendance: 70,080
Referee: Baldomero Toledo

August 6
16:00 (15:00 UTC−5)

Barcelona (Spain)	2–0	(Mexico) Club América
Villa 24'; Keita 90'	Report

Cowboys Stadium, Arlington, Texas
Attendance: 60,087
Referee: Ricardo Salazar

== Top goalscorers ==
Rank	Name	Team	Goals
1	(Portugal) Cristiano Ronaldo	Real Madrid	4
2	(Spain) José Callejón	Real Madrid	2
2	(Portugal) Yannick Djaló	Sporting	2
2	(Mexico) Marco Fabián	Guadalajara	2
2	(Italy) Federico Macheda	Manchester United	2
2	(Portugal) Nani	Manchester United	2
2	(England) Michael Owen	Manchester United	2
2	(Spain) David Villa	Barcelona	2
2	(England) Shaun Wright-Phillips	Manchester City	2
10	(Italy) Mario Balotelli	Manchester City	1
10	(France) Karim Benzema	Real Madrid	1
10	(Mexico) Giovani Casillas	Guadalajara	1
10	(United States) Adam Cristman	Los Angeles Galaxy	1
10	(Italy) Alessandro Del Piero	Juventus	1
10	(United States) Michael Farfan	Philadelphia Union	1
10	(United States) Cory Gibbs	Chicago Fire	1
10	(Sweden) John Guidetti	Manchester City	1
10	(South Korea) Park Ji-sung	Manchester United	1
10	(Spain) Joselu	Real Madrid	1
10	(Mali) Seydou Keita	Barcelona	1
10	(United States) Mike Magee	Los Angeles Galaxy	1
10	(The Gambia) Kenny Mansally	New England Revolution	1
10	(Northern Ireland) Ryan McGivern	Manchester City	1
10	(Germany) Mesut Özil	Real Madrid	1
10	(Italy) Cristian Pasquato	Juventus	1
10	(Italy) Fabio Quagliarella	Juventus	1
10	(Brazil) Rafael	Manchester United	1
10	(England) Wayne Rooney	Manchester United	1
10	(Brazil) Camilo Sanvezzo	Vancouver Whitecaps FC	1
10	(Spain) Thiago	Barcelona	1
10	(Mexico) José Verduzco	Guadalajara	1

== Media coverage ==
Country / Region	Broadcaster	Matches
(Arab League) Arab World Countries: Algeria; Bahrain; Comoros; Djibouti; Egypt; Iraq; Jordan; Kuwait; Lebanon; Oman; Palestine; Libya; Mauritania; Morocco; Qatar; Saudi Arabia; Somalia; Sudan; Syria; Tunisia; United Arab Emirates; Yemen	Al Jazeera Sports	All Real Madrid and Manchester United matches
Israel	Sport 2	All Manchester United matches
Israel	Sport 5	All Real Madrid matches
Italy	Sportitalia	All Real Madrid matches
Norway	TV 2 Premier League HD 1	All Real Madrid and Manchester United matches
United States	ESPN	All
United Kingdom	MUTV	All Manchester United matches
