= World Football Challenge =

- Founded: 2009
- Abolished: 2013
- Region: Canada; United States
- Teams: Varies
- Broadcaster(s): ESPN; Univisión
- Website: mlssoccer.com

The World Football Challenge was an international club association football exhibition competition featuring club teams from Europe and North America, that was held from 2009 until 2012, when it was replaced by the International Champions Cup.

== History ==
The 2009 World Football Challenge was the first World Football Challenge event, featuring Chelsea from the Premier League in England, América from the Primera División de México in Mexico, and Internazionale and AC Milan from Serie A in Italy. Chelsea were the 2009 champions.

The 2011 World Football Challenge was held in July and August 2011. It featured thirteen different squads meeting up in fourteen matches across the United States and Canada. The tournament format was very different from the 2009 event, due to the increase in number of teams, including five MLS teams. Four of the MLS teams played one match at home while L.A. Galaxy played one match on their home pitch and one at the larger Los Angeles Memorial Coliseum. Real Madrid emerged as the World Football Challenge winners for 2011 with 17 points, narrowly edging-out Manchester United on goal differential. The only European clubs to play against each other in this tournament were Juventus and Sporting CP. This was Sporting CP's only match in the exhibition.

The 2012 World Football Challenge was held in seven American and one Canadian stadium in July and August 2012. Eleven clubs competed from UEFA and CONCACAF. Real Madrid played the most matches and went undefeated.

On April 15, 2013, it was announced that the International Champions Cup would be replacing the World Football Challenge.

== Winners ==
Tournament	Winner	Nation	Runner-up	Nation	Third	Nation
2009	Chelsea	England	América	Mexico	Internazionale	Italy
2011	Real Madrid	Spain	Manchester United	England	Manchester City	England
2012	Real Madrid	Spain	n/a (changed to unbalanced format)			
