= 2009 World Football Challenge =

Tournament details
- Country: United States
- Venues: 6 (in 6 host cities)
- Teams: 4 (from 2 confederations)

Final positions
- Champions: (England) Chelsea
- Runners-up: (Mexico) América

Tournament statistics
- Matches played: 6
- Goals scored: 14 (2.33 per match)
- Attendance: 336,813 (56,136 per match)
- Top goal scorer(s): (Ivory Coast) Didier Drogba (Argentina) Diego Milito (2 goals)

The 2009 World Football Challenge was the first edition of the World Football Challenge, an exhibition international club association football competition featuring football clubs from Europe and North America, which has been held first in summer of 2009 in the United States. Chelsea was the champions.

== Format ==
In 2009, each team played the other three teams in the tournament once in a round-robin tournament format, with each game played at a neutral venue in the United States. Chelsea emerged as the World Football Challenge champion for 2009. The following four clubs participated in the 2009 tournament:

- Chelsea from the Premier League in England
- América from the Primera División in Mexico
- Inter Milan from the Serie A in Italy
- Milan from the Serie A in Italy

== Venues ==
Six cities served as the venues of the 2009 World Football Challenge.

Stanford, California	Pasadena, California	Atlanta, Georgia
Stanford Stadium	Rose Bowl	Georgia Dome
Capacity: 50,000	Capacity: 95,542	Capacity: 71,228
Location of the host cities of the 2009 World Football Challenge.
Baltimore, Maryland	Foxborough, Massachusetts	Arlington, Texas
M&T Bank Stadium	Gillette Stadium	Cowboys Stadium
Capacity: 71,008	Capacity: 68,756	Capacity: 80,000

== Rules ==
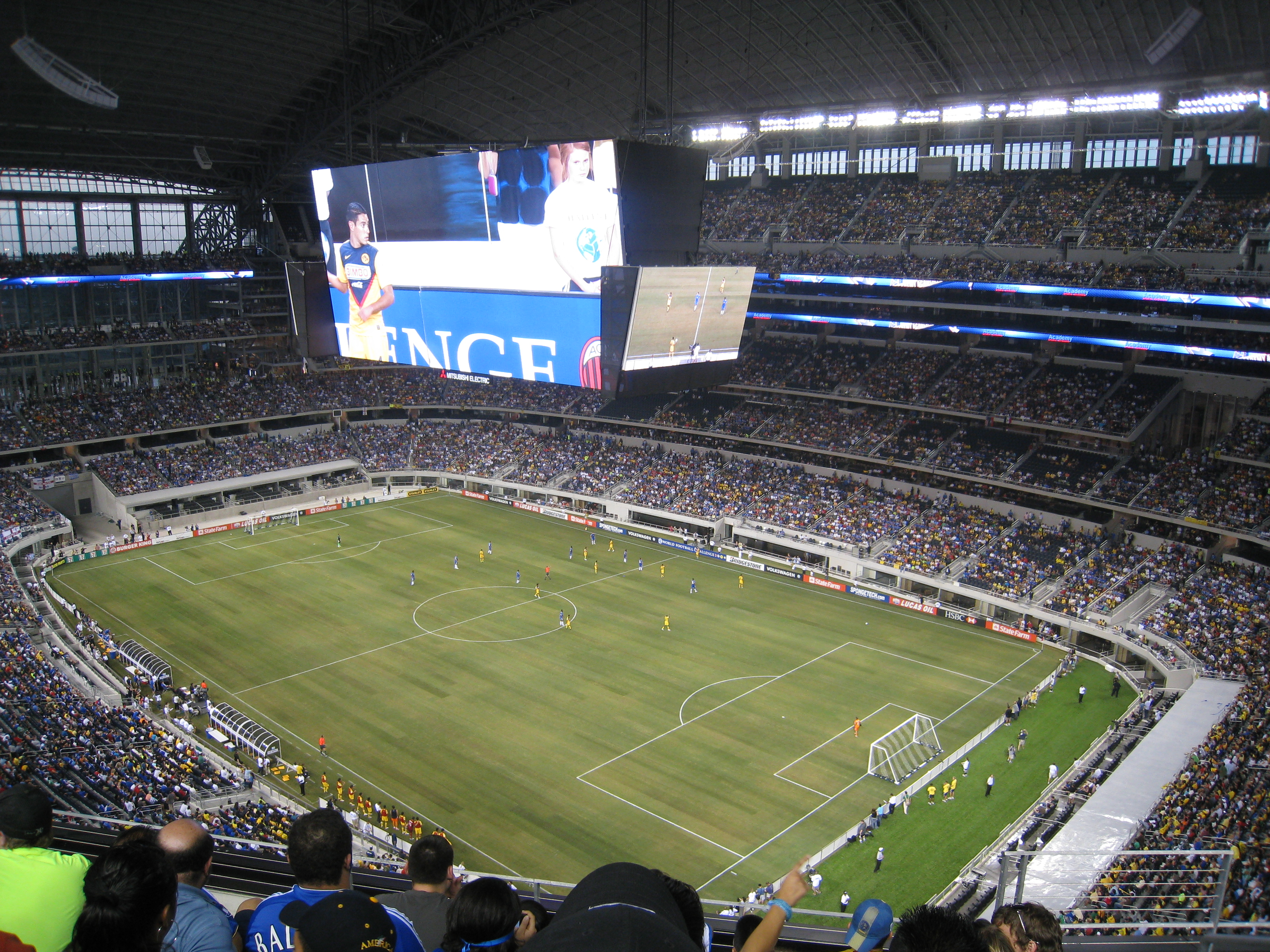
Chelsea vs América at the Cowboys Stadium.

Clubs received one point for each goal scored in regulation time (up to three goals per game). Clubs earned three points for a win that does not go into penalty kicks. After 90 minutes of play, if the match was tied, each team received one point and the winner of the penalty kicks received an additional point. The team with the highest overall number of points determined the World Football Challenge champion.

== Standings ==
Pos	Nation	Team	Pld	W	PKW	PKL	L	GF	GA	GD	Pts
1	England	Chelsea	3	3	0	0	0	6	1	+5	15
2	Mexico	América	3	1	1	0	1	3	4	−1	8
3	Italy	Inter Milan	3	1	0	1	1	3	3	0	7
4	Italy	Milan	3	0	0	0	3	2	6	−4	2

== Matches ==
July 19
19:00 EST

América (Mexico)	1–1	(Italy) Inter Milan
Silva 51'	Report	Córdoba 61'
Penalties
Chitiva (penalty scored); Mosquera (penalty scored); Silva (penalty scored); Márquez (penalty scored); Ó. Rojas (penalty scored)	5–4	(penalty scored) Balotelli; (penalty scored) Milito; (penalty scored) Ibrahimović; (penalty missed) Vieira; (penalty scored) Burdisso

Stanford Stadium, Stanford, California
Attendance: 31,026
Referee: Baldomero Toledo (California)

July 21
23:00 EST

Chelsea (England)	2–0	(Italy) Inter Milan
Drogba 11'; Lampard 50' (pen.)	Report

Rose Bowl, Pasadena, California
Attendance: 81,224
Referee: Ricardo Salazar (California)

July 22
19:00 EST

América (Mexico)	2–1	(Italy) Milan
Esqueda 56'; Márquez 84'	Report	Inzaghi 66'

Georgia Dome, Atlanta, Georgia
Attendance: 53,600
Referee: Alex Prus (South Carolina)

July 24
20:00 EST

Chelsea (England)	2–1	(Italy) Milan
Drogba 7'; Zhirkov 69'	Report	Seedorf 38'

M&T Bank Stadium, Baltimore, Maryland
Attendance: 71,203
Referee: Mark Geiger (New Jersey)

July 26
17:00 EST

Inter Milan (Italy)	2–0	(Italy) Milan
Milito 4', 75'	Report

Gillette Stadium, Foxborough, Massachusetts
Attendance: 42,531
Referee: Jorge González (New York)

July 26
19:00 EST

Chelsea (England)	2–0	(Mexico) América
Di Santo 76'; Malouda 78'	Report

Cowboys Stadium, Arlington, Texas
Attendance: 57,229
Referee: Paul Ward (Vancouver)

== Top goalscorers ==
Rank	Player	Nation	Club	Goals
1	Didier Drogba	CIV	Chelsea	2
1	Diego Milito	ARG	Inter Milan	2
3	Iván Córdoba	COL	Inter Milan	1
3	Enrique Esqueda	MEX	América	1
3	Filippo Inzaghi	ITA	Milan	1
3	Frank Lampard	ENG	Chelsea	1
3	Florent Malouda	FRA	Chelsea	1
3	Daniel Márquez	MEX	América	1
3	Franco Di Santo	ARG	Chelsea	1
3	Clarence Seedorf	NED	Milan	1
3	Juan Carlos Silva	MEX	América	1
3	Yuri Zhirkov	RUS	Chelsea	1
