= Edvin Jurisevic =

American soccer referee

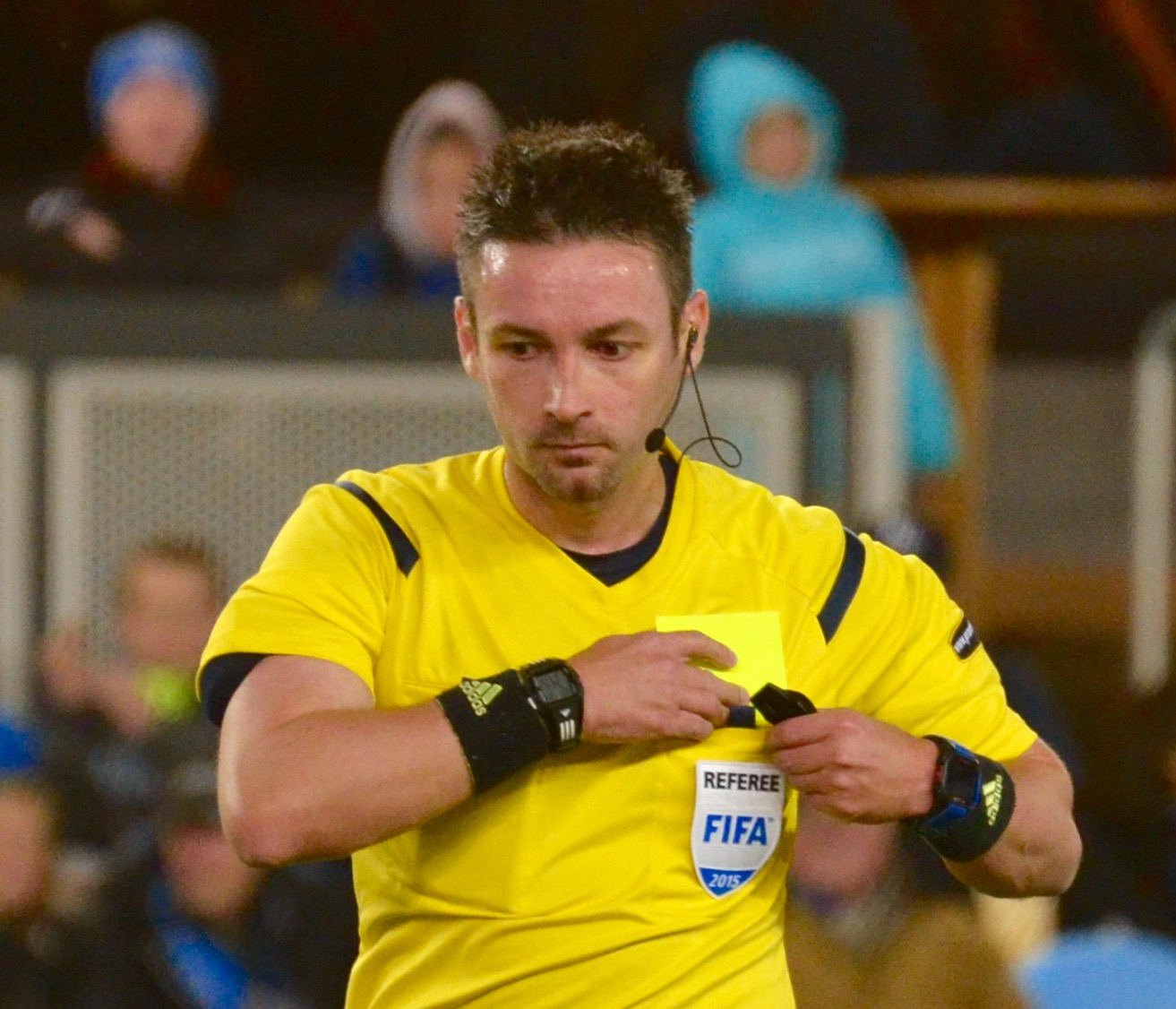
- Jurisevic at Avaya Stadium in 2015
- Born: June 7, 1975 (age 51); Rijeka, SR Croatia, SFR Yugoslavia

Domestic
Years	League	Role
2008-2017	MLS	Referee
2017-	MLS	VAR
2011-2017	NASL	Referee

International
Years	League	Role
2010-2017	FIFA	Referee
2021-	FIFA	VAR

Edvin Jurisevic (Croatian: Edvin Jurišević; born June 7, 1975) is a Croatian-American soccer referee from Rijeka, Croatia, living Omaha, Nebraska. He was a FIFA referee from 2010 to 2017, and has been a FIFA VAR since 2021.

== Referee ==
Jurisevic made his Major League Soccer debut in 2008 and received his FIFA badge in 2010. He refereed over 100 regular season matches, and was assigned an MLS Cup playoff game in 2012. He also refereed US Open Cup semifinals in 2009 and 2016.

Jurisevic was assigned 2013 NASL Soccer Bowl Final. He was also appointed to the 2013 International Champions Cup Final between Real Madrid and Chelsea. He refereed at the 2013 CONCACAF U-20 Championships, where took charge of a group stage match and a quarterfinal. In 2015, Jurisevic worked the CONCACAF U-17 Championships, and was assigned as the fourth official for the final.

== Video Assistant Referee ==
Edvin Jurisevic transitioned to being a VAR when it debuted in the MLS in 2017. Jurisevic became a FIFA video match official in 2021.

Jurisevic was selected as the VAR for the MLS All Star game in 2019, and was also assigned the MLS Cup final between Toronto FC and the Seattle Sounders FC.

In 2021, Jurisevic was selected as a VAR for the Tokyo Olympics. He was appointed the VAR for a group stage match. He has been a video match official for the CONCACAF Gold Cup in 2021, 2023, and 2025. Edvin Jurisevic was the VAR for the Leauges Cup Final in 2024 between the Columbus Crew and LAFC.
