= List of MLS club post-season droughts =

These are lists of active and all-time Major League Soccer (MLS) droughts in the MLS Cup playoffs, CONCACAF Champions Cup, U.S. Open Cup, and Canadian Championship. Those teams which have never made it in club history are listed by the season that they entered the league.

Among the current 30 MLS clubs to have completed at least one season, 14 have never won the MLS Cup. The longest MLS Cup drought is jointly held by the New York Red Bulls (formerly the MetroStars), New England Revolution, and FC Dallas, all of whom have played in every MLS season since the inaugural 1996 campaign without ever winning the championship. Among those clubs which have won the MLS Cup, the longest title drought is that of Chicago Fire FC, who have not won the honor since winning MLS Cup 1998. 15 clubs have never won the Supporters' Shield, with Colorado Rapids being the only club to play in every season without ever winning the Shield. Among those clubs who have won the Shield, the longest drought is that of Sporting Kansas City, who have not won it since the 2000 season, when they were still known as the Kansas City Wizards.

== List of active droughts ==
=== MLS Cup playoffs appearance ===
Updated through 2026 Major League Soccer season. This list does not include clubs that made the post-season as of that year.

Club	Last appearance in post-season	Length of drought
D.C. United	2019	7 seasons
Toronto FC	2020	6 seasons
Sporting Kansas City	2023	3 seasons
Atlanta United FC	2024	2 seasons
Colorado Rapids	2024	2 seasons
LA Galaxy	2024	2 seasons
CF Montréal	2024	2 seasons
New York Red Bulls	2024	2 seasons
Austin FC	2025	1 season
Minnesota United FC	2025	1 season
New York City FC	2025	1 season
San Diego FC	2025	1 season

=== MLS Cup round one appearance ===
Updated through 2026 Major League Soccer season. This list does not include clubs that reached round one as of that year.

Club	Last appearance in round one	Length of drought
D.C. United	2019	7 seasons
Toronto FC	2020	6 seasons
CF Montréal	2022	4 seasons
Sporting Kansas City	2023	3 seasons
Atlanta United FC	2024	2 seasons
Colorado Rapids	2024	2 seasons
LA Galaxy	2024	2 seasons
New York Red Bulls	2024	2 seasons
Orlando City SC	2024	2 seasons
Austin FC	2025	1 season
Minnesota United FC	2025	1 season
New York City FC	2025	1 season
San Diego FC	2025	1 season
Seattle Sounders FC	2025	1 season

=== MLS Cup conference semifinals appearance ===
Updated through 2025 Major League Soccer season. This list does not include clubs that reached the conference semifinals that year.

Club	Last appearance in conference semifinals	Length of drought
Chicago Fire FC	2009	16 seasons
San Jose Earthquakes	2012	13 seasons
D.C. United	2015	10 seasons
Toronto FC	2019	6 seasons
Charlotte FC	never (club entered MLS in 2022)	4 seasons
Colorado Rapids	2021	4 seasons
Nashville SC	2021	4 seasons
New England Revolution	2021	4 seasons
Portland Timbers	2021	4 seasons
Real Salt Lake	2021	4 seasons
Austin FC	2022	3 seasons
CF Montréal	2022	3 seasons
FC Dallas	2022	3 seasons
St. Louis City SC	never (club entered MLS in 2023)	3 seasons
Columbus Crew	2023	2 season
Houston Dynamo FC	2023	2 season
Sporting Kansas City	2023	2 season
Atlanta United FC	2024	1 season
LA Galaxy	2024	1 season
New York Red Bulls	2024	1 season
Orlando City SC	2024	1 season
Seattle Sounders FC	2024	1 season

=== MLS Cup conference finals appearance ===
Updated through 2025 Major League Soccer season. Does not include clubs that reached the conference finals that year.

Club	Last appearance in conference finals	Length of drought
Chicago Fire FC	2009	16 seasons
San Jose Earthquakes	2010	15 seasons
D.C. United	2012	13 seasons
FC Dallas	2015	10 seasons
CF Montréal	2016	9 seasons
Colorado Rapids	2016	9 seasons
Sporting Kansas City	2018	7 seasons
Atlanta United FC	2019	6 seasons
Nashville SC	never (club entered MLS in 2020)	6 seasons
Toronto FC	2019	6 seasons
Minnesota United FC	2020	5 seasons
New England Revolution	2020	5 seasons
Charlotte FC	never (club entered MLS in 2022)	4 seasons
Portland Timbers	2021	4 seasons
Real Salt Lake	2021	4 seasons
Austin FC	2022	3 seasons
Philadelphia Union	2022	3 seasons
St. Louis City SC	never (club entered MLS in 2023)	3 seasons
Columbus Crew	2023	2 seasons
FC Cincinnati	2023	2 seasons
Houston Dynamo FC	2023	2 seasons
Los Angeles FC	2023	2 seasons
LA Galaxy	2024	1 season
New York Red Bulls	2024	1 season
Orlando City SC	2024	1 season
Seattle Sounders FC	2024	1 season

=== MLS Cup final appearance ===
Updated through 2025 Major League Soccer season. Does not include clubs that appeared in MLS Cup 2025.

Club	Last appearance in MLS Cup	Length of drought
Chicago Fire FC	2003	22 seasons
D.C. United	2004	21 seasons
San Jose Earthquakes	2003	20 seasons^{1}
Colorado Rapids	2010	15 seasons
FC Dallas	2010	15 seasons
CF Montréal	never (club entered MLS in 2012)	14 seasons
Houston Dynamo FC	2012	13 seasons
Real Salt Lake	2013	12 seasons
Sporting Kansas City	2013	12 seasons
New England Revolution	2014	11 seasons
Orlando City SC	never (club entered MLS in 2015)	11 seasons
Minnesota United FC	never (club entered MLS in 2017)	9 seasons
Atlanta United FC	2018	7 seasons
FC Cincinnati	never (club entered MLS in 2019)	7 seasons
Nashville SC	never (club entered MLS in 2020)	6 seasons
Toronto FC	2019	6 seasons
Austin FC	never (club entered MLS in 2021)	5 seasons
Seattle Sounders FC	2020	5 seasons
Charlotte FC	never (club entered MLS in 2022)	4 seasons
New York City FC	2021	4 seasons
Portland Timbers	2021	4 seasons
Philadelphia Union	2022	3 seasons
St. Louis City SC	never (club entered MLS in 2023)	3 seasons
Columbus Crew	2023	2 seasons
Los Angeles FC	2023	2 seasons
LA Galaxy	2024	1 season
New York Red Bulls	2024	1 season
San Diego FC	never (club entered MLS in 2025)	1 season

^{1} Does not include 2006–2007 when San Jose was dormant.

=== MLS Cup championship ===
Updated through 2025 Major League Soccer season. Does not include the winner of MLS Cup 2025 (Inter Miami CF).

Club	Last MLS Cup	Subsequent final losses	Length of drought
FC Dallas	never (club entered MLS in 1996)	2010	30 seasons
New England Revolution	never (club entered MLS in 1996)	2002, 2005, 2006, 2007, 2014	30 seasons
New York Red Bulls	never (club entered MLS in 1996)	2008, 2024	30 seasons
Chicago Fire FC	1998	2000, 2003	27 seasons
D.C. United	2004		21 seasons
San Jose Earthquakes	2003		20 seasons^{1}
Houston Dynamo FC	2007	2011, 2012	18 seasons
Real Salt Lake	2009	2013	16 seasons
Philadelphia Union	never (club entered MLS in 2010)	2022	16 seasons
Colorado Rapids	2010		15 seasons
Vancouver Whitecaps FC	never (club entered MLS in 2011)	2025	15 seasons
CF Montréal	never (club entered MLS in 2012)		14 seasons
Sporting Kansas City	2013		12 seasons
Orlando City SC	never (club entered MLS in 2015)		11 seasons
Portland Timbers	2015	2018, 2021	10 seasons
Minnesota United FC	never (club entered MLS in 2017)		9 seasons
Toronto FC	2017	2019	8 seasons
Atlanta United FC	2018		7 seasons
FC Cincinnati	never (club entered MLS in 2019)		7 seasons
Nashville SC	never (club entered MLS in 2020)		6 seasons
Seattle Sounders FC	2019	2020	6 seasons
Austin FC	never (club entered MLS in 2021)		5 seasons
Charlotte FC	never (club entered MLS in 2022)		4 seasons
New York City FC	2021		4 seasons
Los Angeles FC	2022	2023	3 seasons
St. Louis City SC	never (club entered MLS in 2023)		3 seasons
Columbus Crew	2023		2 seasons
LA Galaxy	2024		1 season
San Diego FC	never (club entered MLS in 2025)		1 season

^{1} Does not include 2006–2007 when San Jose was dormant.

=== Supporters' Shield win ===
Updated through 2026 Major League Soccer season. This list does not include the current holder of the Supporters' Shield (Nashville SC).

Club	Last Supporters' Shield won	Length of drought
Colorado Rapids	never (club entered MLS in 1996)	31 seasons
Sporting Kansas City	2000	26 seasons
Chicago Fire FC	2003	23 seasons
Real Salt Lake	never (club entered MLS in 2005)	22 seasons
Houston Dynamo FC	never (club entered MLS in 2006)	21 seasons
D.C. United	2007	19 seasons
Columbus Crew	2009	17 seasons
Portland Timbers	never (club entered MLS in 2011)	16 seasons
Vancouver Whitecaps FC	never (club entered MLS in 2011)	16 seasons
CF Montréal	never (club entered MLS in 2012)	15 seasons
LA Galaxy	2011	15 seasons
San Jose Earthquakes	2012	14 seasons
New York City FC	never (club entered MLS in 2015)	12 seasons
Orlando City SC	never (club entered MLS in 2015)	12 seasons
Seattle Sounders FC	2014	12 seasons
Atlanta United FC	never (club entered MLS in 2017)	10 seasons
FC Dallas	2016	10 seasons
Minnesota United FC	never (club entered MLS in 2017)	10 seasons
Toronto FC	2017	9 seasons
New York Red Bulls	2018	8 seasons
Austin FC	never (club entered MLS in 2021)	6 seasons
Charlotte FC	never (club entered MLS in 2022)	5 seasons
New England Revolution	2021	5 seasons
Los Angeles FC	2022	4 seasons
St. Louis City SC	never (club entered MLS in 2023)	4 seasons
FC Cincinnati	2023	3 seasons
Inter Miami CF	2024	2 seasons
San Diego FC	never (club entered MLS in 2025)	2 seasons
Philadelphia Union	2025	1 season

=== CONCACAF Champions Cup appearance ===
Updated through 2026 CONCACAF Champions Cup. From the 2008–09 season to the 2023 season, the competition was known as the Champions League, before reverting back to the Champions Cup name.

Club	Last appearance in CONCACAF Champions Cup	Length of drought
Chicago Fire FC	2004	22 seasons
San Jose Earthquakes	2013–14	12 seasons
D.C. United	2015–16	10 seasons
FC Dallas	2018	8 seasons
Minnesota United FC	never (club entered MLS in 2017)^{1}	8 seasons
New York Red Bulls	2019	7 seasons
Atlanta United FC	2021	5 seasons
Portland Timbers	2021	5 seasons
Toronto FC	2021	5 seasons
CF Montréal	2022	4 seasons
Charlotte FC	never (club entered MLS in 2022)	4 seasons
New York City FC	2022	4 seasons
Austin FC	2023	3 seasons
Houston Dynamo FC	2024	2 seasons
New England Revolution	2024	2 seasons
Orlando City SC	2024	2 seasons
St. Louis City SC	2024	2 seasons
Colorado Rapids	2025	1 season
Columbus Crew	2025	1 season
Real Salt Lake	2025	1 season
Sporting Kansas City	2025	1 season

^{1} This club played in another league before joining MLS and could have qualified for the Champions League by winning the U.S. Open Cup. This table only counts their drought from when they joined MLS.

=== Domestic cup championship ===
Updated through 2026 U.S. Open Cup and 2026 Canadian Championship. This list does not include the current champions (St. Louis City SC and Forge FC).

Club	Last domestic cup won	Subsequent final losses	Length of drought^{1}
Colorado Rapids	never (club entered MLS in 1996)	1999	29 seasons
New York Red Bulls	never (club entered MLS in 1996)	2003, 2017	29 seasons
San Jose Earthquakes	never (club entered MLS in 1996)		27 seasons^{2}
Columbus Crew	2002 U.S. Open Cup	2010, 2026	22 seasons
Real Salt Lake	never (club entered MLS in 2005)	2013	20 seasons
LA Galaxy	2005 U.S. Open Cup	2006	19 seasons
Chicago Fire FC	2006 U.S. Open Cup	2011	18 seasons
New England Revolution	2007 U.S. Open Cup	2016	17 seasons
Philadelphia Union	never (club entered MLS in 2010)	2014, 2015, 2018	15 seasons
Portland Timbers	never (club entered MLS in 2011)^{3}		14 seasons
D.C. United	2013 U.S. Open Cup		11 seasons
New York City FC	never (club entered MLS in 2015)		10 seasons
Seattle Sounders FC	2014 U.S. Open Cup		10 seasons
FC Dallas	2016 U.S. Open Cup		8 seasons
Minnesota United FC	never (club entered MLS in 2017)^{3}	2019	8 seasons
Sporting Kansas City	2017 U.S. Open Cup	2024	7 seasons
FC Cincinnati	never (club entered MLS in 2019)^{3}		6 seasons
Toronto FC	2020 Canadian Championship	2021, 2022, 2024	6 seasons^{4}
Atlanta United FC	2019 U.S. Open Cup		5 seasons
Austin FC	never (club entered MLS in 2021)	2025	5 seasons
CF Montréal	2021 Canadian Championship	2023, 2026	5 seasons^{4}
Charlotte FC	never (club entered MLS in 2022)		5 seasons
Inter Miami CF	never (club entered MLS in 2020)	2023	5 seasons
Orlando City SC	2022 U.S. Open Cup		4 seasons
Houston Dynamo FC	2023 U.S. Open Cup		3 seasons
Los Angeles FC	2024 U.S. Open Cup		2 seasons
San Diego FC	never (club entered MLS in 2025)		2 seasons
Nashville SC	2025 U.S. Open Cup		1 season
Vancouver Whitecaps FC	2025 Canadian Championship		1 season

^{1} Does not include 2020 and 2021 when the U.S. Open Cup was canceled.
^{2} Does not include 2006–2007 when San Jose was dormant.
^{3} This club played in another league before joining MLS and competed in the U.S. Open Cup during those years. This table only counts its drought from when it joined MLS.
^{4} The final of the 2020 Canadian Championship did not take place until after the conclusion of the 2021 tournament. This table nevertheless treats the 2020 tournament as happening before the 2021 tournament.

=== Competitive trophy win ===
Updated through 2026.

Club	Last trophy won	Length of drought
Chicago Fire FC	2006 U.S. Open Cup	20 seasons
Real Salt Lake	MLS Cup 2009	17 seasons
Colorado Rapids	MLS Cup 2010	16 seasons
San Jose Earthquakes	2012 Supporters' Shield	14 seasons
D.C. United	2013 U.S. Open Cup	13 seasons
FC Dallas	2016 Supporters' Shield	10 seasons
Minnesota United FC	never (club entered MLS in 2017)	10 seasons
Sporting Kansas City	2017 U.S. Open Cup	9 seasons
New York Red Bulls	2018 Supporters' Shield	8 seasons
Atlanta United FC	2019 U.S. Open Cup	7 seasons
Austin FC	never (club entered MLS in 2021)	6 seasons
Portland Timbers	2020 MLS is Back Tournament	6 seasons
Toronto FC	2020 Canadian Championship	6 seasons
CF Montréal	2021 Canadian Championship	5 seasons
Charlotte FC	never (club entered MLS in 2022)	5 seasons
New England Revolution	2021 Supporters' Shield	5 seasons
New York City FC	2022 Campeones Cup	4 seasons
Orlando City SC	2022 U.S. Open Cup	4 seasons
Houston Dynamo FC	2023 U.S. Open Cup	3 seasons
FC Cincinnati	2023 Supporters' Shield	3 seasons
Columbus Crew	2024 Leagues Cup	2 seasons
LA Galaxy	MLS Cup 2024	2 seasons
Los Angeles FC	2024 U.S. Open Cup	2 seasons
San Diego FC	never (club entered MLS in 2025)	2 seasons
Philadelphia Union	2025 Supporters' Shield	1 season
Seattle Sounders FC	2025 Leagues Cup	1 season
Vancouver Whitecaps FC	2025 Canadian Championship	1 season
Inter Miami CF	2026 Campeones Cup	0 seasons
Nashville SC	2026 Supporters' Shield	0 seasons
St. Louis City SC	2026 U.S. Open Cup	0 seasons

== Longest all-time droughts ==
Each list below shows the 20 longest droughts, plus ties, in the given category.

=== MLS Cup playoffs appearance ===
The list only includes MLS clubs that failed to make the playoffs for three or more consecutive seasons. Updated through 2026 Major League Soccer season.

Active club streak is highlighted

Club	Previous post-season appearance	Next post-season appearance	Length of drought
Toronto FC	never (club entered MLS in 2007)	2015	8 seasons
Chicago Fire FC	2017	2025	7 seasons
D.C. United	2019		7 seasons
Toronto FC	2020		6 seasons
Chivas USA	2009	never (club folded after 2014)	5 seasons
Orlando City SC	never (club entered MLS in 2015)	2020	5 seasons
Houston Dynamo FC	2017	2023	5 seasons
San Jose Clash/Earthquakes	1996	2001	4 seasons
D.C. United	2007	2012	4 seasons
Philadelphia Union	2011	2016	4 seasons
Chicago Fire	2012	2017	4 seasons
San Jose Earthquakes	2012	2017	4 seasons
D.C. United	1999	2003	3 seasons
Columbus Crew	2004	2008	3 seasons
Real Salt Lake	never (club entered MLS in 2005)	2008	3 seasons
LA Galaxy	2005	2009	3 seasons
Colorado Rapids	2006	2010	3 seasons
New England Revolution	2009	2013	3 seasons
Houston Dynamo FC	2013	2017	3 seasons
New England Revolution	2015	2019	3 seasons
Colorado Rapids	2016	2020	3 seasons
Montreal Impact	2016	2020	3 seasons
Vancouver Whitecaps FC	2017	2021	3 seasons
FC Cincinnati	never (club entered MLS in 2019)	2022	3 seasons
Sporting Kansas City	2023		3 seasons

=== MLS Cup round one appearance ===
The list only includes MLS clubs that failed to make round one for three or more consecutive seasons. Updated through 2026 Major League Soccer season.

Active club streak is highlighted

Club	Previous appearance	Next appearance	Length of drought
Toronto FC	never (club entered MLS in 2007)	2015	8 seasons
Chicago Fire FC	2017	2025	7 seasons
D.C. United	2019		7 seasons
Toronto FC	2020		6 seasons
Chivas USA	2009^{1}	never (club folded after 2014)	5 seasons
Orlando City SC	never (club entered MLS in 2015)	2020	5 seasons
Montreal Impact/CF Montréal	2016	2022	5 seasons
Houston Dynamo FC	2017	2023	5 seasons
San Jose Earthquakes	2020	2026	5 seasons
San Jose Clash/Earthquakes	1996^{1}	2001^{1}	4 seasons
D.C. United	2007^{1}	2012^{2}	4 seasons
Philadelphia Union	2011^{2}	2016	4 seasons
Chicago Fire	2012	2017	4 seasons
San Jose Earthquakes	2012^{2}	2017	4 seasons
D.C. United	1999^{1}	2003^{1}	3 seasons
Columbus Crew	2004^{1}	2008^{1}	3 seasons
Real Salt Lake	never (club entered MLS in 2005)	2008^{1}	3 seasons
LA Galaxy	2005^{1}	2009^{1}	3 seasons
Colorado Rapids	2006^{1}	2010^{1}	3 seasons
New England Revolution	2009^{1}	2013^{2}	3 seasons
Houston Dynamo FC	2013	2017	3 seasons
New England Revolution	2015	2019	3 seasons
Colorado Rapids	2016^{2}	2020	3 seasons
Vancouver Whitecaps FC	2017	2021	3 seasons
FC Cincinnati	never (club entered MLS in 2019)	2022	3 seasons
Portland Timbers	2021	2025	3 seasons
CF Montréal	2022		4 seasons
Sporting Kansas City	2023		3 seasons

^{1} This club did not actually appear in round one because the round had not yet been created, with the playoffs commencing with the conference semifinals. For the purposes of this table, the club is treated as if it did appear in round one.
^{2} This club did not actually appear in round one because it received a bye to the conference semifinals. For the purposes of this table, the club is treated as if it did appear.

=== MLS Cup conference semifinals appearance ===
The list only includes clubs that failed to make the conference semifinals for four or more consecutive seasons. Updated through 2025 Major League Soccer season.

Active club streak is highlighted

Club	Previous appearance	Next appearance	Length of drought
Chicago Fire FC	2009		16 seasons
San Jose Earthquakes	2012		13 seasons
D.C. United	2015		10 seasons
Toronto FC	never (club entered MLS in 2007)	2016	9 seasons
Philadelphia Union	2011	2019	7 seasons
Vancouver Whitecaps FC	2017	2025	7 seasons
Toronto FC	2019		6 seasons
Chivas USA	2009	never (club folded after 2014)	5 seasons
New England Revolution	2014	2020	5 seasons
Orlando City SC	never (club entered MLS in 2015)	2020	5 seasons
Montreal Impact/CF Montréal	2016	2022	5 seasons
Houston Dynamo FC	2017	2023	5 seasons
New York Red Bulls	2018	2024	5 seasons
Inter Miami CF	never (club entered MLS in 2020)	2025	5 seasons
San Jose Clash/Earthquakes	1996	2001	4 seasons
D.C. United	2007	2012	4 seasons
Vancouver Whitecaps FC	never (club entered MLS in 2011)	2015	4 seasons
Colorado Rapids	2011	2016	4 seasons
Sporting Kansas City	2013	2018	4 seasons
Colorado Rapids	2016	2021	4 seasons
Atlanta United FC	2019	2024	4 seasons
Charlotte FC	never (club entered MLS in 2022)		4 seasons
Colorado Rapids	2021		4 seasons
Nashville SC	2021		4 seasons
New England Revolution	2021		4 seasons
Portland Timbers	2021		4 seasons
Real Salt Lake	2021		4 seasons

=== MLS Cup conference finals appearance ===
The list only includes clubs that failed to make the conference finals for six or more consecutive seasons. Updated through 2025 Major League Soccer season.

Active club streak is highlighted

Club	Previous appearance	Next appearance	Length of drought
Chicago Fire FC	2009		16 seasons
San Jose Earthquakes	2010		15 seasons
Vancouver Whitecaps FC	never (club entered MLS in 2011)	2025	14 seasons
D.C. United	2012		13 seasons
Philadelphia Union	never (club entered MLS in 2010)	2021	11 seasons
Dallas Burn/FC Dallas	1999	2010	10 seasons
Chivas USA	never (club entered MLS in 2005)	never (club folded after 2014)	10 seasons
FC Dallas	2015		10 seasons
Toronto FC	never (club entered MLS in 2007)	2016	9 seasons
LA Galaxy	2014	2024	9 seasons
Orlando City SC	never (club entered MLS in 2015)	2024	9 seasons
Montreal Impact/CF Montréal	2016		9 seasons
Colorado Rapids	2016		9 seasons
MetroStars/New York Red Bulls	2000	2008	7 seasons
Real Salt Lake	2013	2021	7 seasons
Sporting Kansas City	2018		7 seasons
New England Revolution	never (club entered MLS in 1996)	2002	6 seasons
New England Revolution	2007	2014	6 seasons
Columbus Crew	2008	2015	6 seasons
New York City FC	never (club entered MLS in 2015)	2021	6 seasons
Atlanta United FC	2019		6 seasons
Nashville SC	never (club entered MLS in 2020)		6 seasons
Toronto FC	2019		6 seasons

=== MLS Cup final appearance ===
The list only includes clubs that failed to make the MLS Cup final for nine or more consecutive seasons. Updated through 2025 Major League Soccer season.

Active club streak is highlighted

Club	Previous appearance	Next appearance	Length of drought
Chicago Fire FC	2003		22 seasons
D.C. United	2004		21 seasons
San Jose Earthquakes	2003		20 seasons^{1}
New York Red Bulls	2008	2024	15 seasons
Colorado Rapids	2010		15 seasons
FC Dallas	2010		15 seasons
Dallas Burn/FC Dallas	never (club entered MLS in 1996)	2010	14 seasons
Vancouver Whitecaps FC	never (club entered MLS in 2011)	2025	14 seasons
Montreal Impact/CF Montréal	never (club entered MLS in 2012)		14 seasons
Houston Dynamo FC	2012		13 seasons
Columbus Crew	never (club entered MLS in 1996)	2008	12 seasons
MetroStars/New York Red Bulls	never (club entered MLS in 1996)	2008	12 seasons
Colorado Rapids	1997	2010	12 seasons
Philadelphia Union	never (club entered MLS in 2010)	2022	12 seasons
Real Salt Lake	2013		12 seasons
Sporting Kansas City	2013		12 seasons
New England Revolution	2014		11 seasons
Orlando City SC	never (club entered MLS in 2015)		11 seasons
Chivas USA	never (club entered MLS in 2005)	never (club folded after 2014)	10 seasons
Toronto FC	never (club entered MLS in 2007)	2016	9 seasons
LA Galaxy	2014	2024	9 seasons
Minnesota United FC	never (club entered MLS in 2017)		9 seasons

^{1} Does not include 2006–2007 when San Jose was dormant.

=== MLS Cup championship ===
The list only includes clubs that failed to win an MLS Cup championship for ten or more consecutive seasons. Updated through 2025 Major League Soccer season.

Active club streak is highlighted

Club	Previous championship	Next championship	Length of drought
Dallas Burn/FC Dallas	never (club entered MLS in 1996)		30 seasons
MetroStars/New York Red Bulls	never (club entered MLS in 1996)		30 seasons
New England Revolution	never (club entered MLS in 1996)		30 seasons
Chicago Fire FC	1998		27 seasons
D.C. United	2004		21 seasons
San Jose Earthquakes	2003		20 seasons^{1}
Houston Dynamo FC	2007		18 seasons
Philadelphia Union	never (club entered MLS in 2010)		16 seasons
Real Salt Lake	2009		16 seasons
Colorado Rapids	never (club entered MLS in 1996)	2010	15 seasons
Colorado Rapids	2010		15 seasons
Vancouver Whitecaps FC	never (club entered MLS in 2011)		15 seasons
Montreal Impact/CF Montréal	never (club entered MLS in 2012)		14 seasons
Kansas City Wizards/Sporting Kansas City	2000	2013	13 seasons
Sporting Kansas City	2013		12 seasons
Columbus Crew	2008	2020	11 seasons
Orlando City SC	never (club entered MLS in 2015)		11 seasons
Chivas USA	never (club entered MLS in 2005)	never (club folded after 2014)	10 seasons
Toronto FC	never (club entered MLS in 2007)	2017	10 seasons
Portland Timbers	2015		10 seasons

^{1} Does not include 2006–2007 when San Jose was dormant.

=== Supporters' Shield win ===
The list only includes clubs that failed to win a Supporters' Shield for ten or more consecutive seasons. Updated through 2026 Major League Soccer season.

Active club streak is highlighted

Club	Previous Supporters' Shield won	Next Supporters' Shield won	Length of drought
Colorado Rapids	never (club entered MLS in 1996)		31 seasons
New England Revolution	never (club entered MLS in 1996)	2021	25 seasons
Kansas City Wizards/Sporting Kansas City	2000		26 seasons
Chicago Fire FC	2003		23 seasons
Real Salt Lake	never (club entered MLS in 2005)		22 seasons
Dallas Burn/FC Dallas	never (club entered MLS in 1996)	2016	20 seasons
Houston Dynamo FC	never (club entered MLS in 2006)		21 seasons
D.C. United	2007		19 seasons
MetroStars/New York Red Bulls	never (club entered MLS in 1996)	2013	17 seasons
Columbus Crew	2009		17 seasons
Portland Timbers	never (club entered MLS in 2011)		16 seasons
Vancouver Whitecaps FC	never (club entered MLS in 2011)		16 seasons
Montreal Impact/CF Montréal	never (club entered MLS in 2012)		15 seasons
LA Galaxy	2011		15 seasons
San Jose Earthquakes	2012		14 seasons
New York City FC	never (club entered MLS in 2015)		12 seasons
Orlando City SC	never (club entered MLS in 2015)		12 seasons
Seattle Sounders FC	2014		12 seasons
Chivas USA	never (club entered MLS in 2005)	never (club folded after 2014)	10 seasons
Toronto FC	never (club entered MLS in 2007)	2017	10 seasons
Philadelphia Union	never (club entered MLS in 2010)	2020	10 seasons
Atlanta United FC	never (club entered MLS in 2017)		10 seasons
FC Dallas	2016		10 seasons
Minnesota United FC	never (club entered MLS in 2017)		10 seasons

=== CONCACAF Champions Cup appearance ===
The list only includes clubs that failed to qualify for the CONCACAF Champions Cup for five or more consecutive seasons. Updated through 2026 CONCACAF Champions Cup.

Active club streak is highlighted

Club	Previous appearance	Next appearance	Length of drought
Chicago Fire FC	2004		22 seasons
Dallas Burn/FC Dallas	never (club entered MLS in 1996)	2011–12	14 seasons
MetroStars/New York Red Bulls	never (club entered MLS in 1996)	2009–10	12 seasons
Colorado Rapids	1998	2011–12	12 seasons
New England Revolution	2008–09	2022	12 seasons
San Jose Earthquakes	2013–14		12 seasons
D.C. United	2015–16		10 seasons
Columbus Crew	2010–11	2021	9 seasons
Philadelphia Union	never (club entered MLS in 2010)	2021	9 seasons
Kansas City Wizards/Sporting Kansas City	2005	2013–14	8 seasons
LA Galaxy	2015–16	2025	8 seasons
Real Salt Lake	2015–16	2025	8 seasons
FC Dallas	2018		8 seasons
Minnesota United FC	never (club entered MLS in 2017)^{1}		8 seasons
Chivas USA	2008–09	never (club folded after 2014)	7 seasons
New York Red Bulls	2019		7 seasons
Columbus Crew	2003	2009–10	6 seasons
San Jose Earthquakes	2004	2013–14	6 seasons^{2}
Orlando City SC	never (club entered MLS in 2015)^{1}	2023	6 seasons
Columbus Crew	never (club entered MLS in 1996)	2003	5 seasons
New England Revolution	never (club entered MLS in 1996)	2003	5 seasons
Tampa Bay Mutiny	never (club entered MLS in 1996)	never (club folded after 2001)	5 seasons
Real Salt Lake	never (club entered MLS in 2005)	2010–11	5 seasons
Colorado Rapids	2011–12	2018	5 seasons
Vancouver Whitecaps FC	2015–16	2023	5 seasons
Sporting Kansas City	2019	2025	5 seasons
Atlanta United FC	2021		5 seasons
Portland Timbers	2021		5 seasons
Toronto FC	2021		5 seasons

^{1} This club played in another league before joining MLS and could have qualified for the Champions League by winning the U.S. Open Cup. This table only counts its drought from when it joined MLS.
^{2} Does not include the 2007, 2008, and 2008−09 tournaments which San Jose could not qualify for due to being on hiatus.

=== Domestic cup championship ===
The list only includes clubs that failed to win the U.S. Open Cup or Canadian Championship for seven or more consecutive seasons. Updated through 2026 U.S. Open Cup and 2026 Canadian Championship.

Active club streak is highlighted

Club	Previous championship	Next championship	Length of drought
Colorado Rapids	never (club entered MLS in 1996)		29 seasons^{1}
MetroStars/New York Red Bulls	never (club entered MLS in 1996)		29 seasons^{1}
San Jose Clash/Earthquakes	never (club entered MLS in 1996)		27 seasons^{1, 2}
Columbus Crew	2002 U.S. Open Cup		22 seasons^{1}
Real Salt Lake	never (club entered MLS in 2005)		20 seasons^{1}
LA Galaxy	2005 U.S. Open Cup		19 seasons^{1}
Dallas Burn/FC Dallas	1997 U.S. Open Cup	2016 U.S. Open Cup	18 seasons
Chicago Fire FC	2006 U.S. Open Cup		18 seasons^{1}
New England Revolution	2007 U.S. Open Cup		17 seasons^{1}
Philadelphia Union	never (club entered MLS in 2010)		15 seasons^{1}
Portland Timbers	never (club entered MLS in 2011)^{3}		14 seasons^{1}
Houston Dynamo FC	never (club entered MLS in 2006)	2018 U.S. Open Cup	12 seasons
New England Revolution	never (club entered MLS in 1996)	2007 U.S. Open Cup	11 seasons
D.C. United	1996 U.S. Open Cup	2008 U.S. Open Cup	11 seasons
D.C. United	2013 U.S. Open Cup		11 seasons^{1}
Chivas USA	never (club entered MLS in 2005)	never (club folded after 2014)	10 seasons
New York City FC	never (club entered MLS in 2015)		10 seasons^{1}
Seattle Sounders FC	2014 U.S. Open Cup		10 seasons^{1}
Kansas City Wizards	never (club entered MLS in 1996)	2004 U.S. Open Cup	8 seasons
FC Dallas	2016 U.S. Open Cup		8 seasons^{1}
Minnesota United FC	never (club entered MLS in 2017)^{3}		8 seasons^{1}
Kansas City Wizards/Sporting Kansas City	2004 U.S. Open Cup	2012 U.S. Open Cup	7 seasons
Sporting Kansas City	2017 U.S. Open Cup		7 seasons^{1}

^{1} Does not include 2020 and 2021 when the U.S. Open Cup was canceled.
^{2} Does not include 2006–2007 when San Jose was dormant.
^{3} The club played in another league before joining MLS and competed in the U.S. Open Cup during those years. This table only counts its drought from when it joined MLS.

=== Competitive trophy win ===
The list only includes clubs that failed to win a competitive trophy for seven or more consecutive seasons. Updated through 2026.

Active club streak is highlighted

Club	Previous trophy won	Next trophy won	Length of drought
Chicago Fire FC	2006 U.S. Open Cup		20 seasons
Dallas Burn/FC Dallas	1997 U.S. Open Cup	2016 U.S. Open Cup	18 seasons
Real Salt Lake	MLS Cup 2009		17 seasons
MetroStars/New York Red Bulls	never (club entered MLS in 1996)	2013 Supporters' Shield	16 seasons
Colorado Rapids	MLS Cup 2010		16 seasons
Colorado Rapids	never (club entered MLS in 1996)	MLS Cup 2010	14 seasons
San Jose Earthquakes	2012 Supporters' Shield		14 seasons
D.C. United	2013 U.S. Open Cup		13 seasons
New England Revolution	2008 North American SuperLiga	2021 Supporters' Shield	12 seasons
New England Revolution	never (club entered MLS in 1996)	2007 U.S. Open Cup	11 seasons
Chivas USA	never (club entered MLS in 2005)	never (club folded after 2014)	10 seasons
Houston Dynamo FC	MLS Cup 2007	2018 U.S. Open Cup	10 seasons
Columbus Crew	2009 Supporters' Shield	MLS Cup 2020	10 seasons
Philadelphia Union	never (club entered MLS in 2010)	2020 Supporters' Shield	10 seasons
FC Dallas	2016 Supporters' Shield		10 seasons
Minnesota United FC	never (club entered MLS in 2017)		10 seasons
LA Galaxy	MLS Cup 2014	MLS Cup 2024	9 seasons
Sporting Kansas City	2017 U.S. Open Cup		9 seasons
New York Red Bulls	2018 Supporters' Shield		8 seasons
Kansas City Wizards/Sporting Kansas City	2004 U.S. Open Cup	2012 U.S. Open Cup	7 seasons
Orlando City SC	never (club entered MLS in 2015)	2022 U.S. Open Cup	7 seasons
Atlanta United FC	2019 U.S. Open Cup		7 seasons

== See also ==
- Major League Soccer
- List of Major League Baseball franchise postseason droughts
- List of National Basketball Association franchise post-season droughts
- List of National Football League franchise post-season droughts
- List of National Hockey League franchise post-season droughts
