= 2016 MLS Cup playoffs =

2016 edition of the MLS playoffs

Tournament details
- Country: United States; Canada
- Dates: October 26 – December 10
- Teams: 12

Final positions
- Champions: Seattle Sounders FC (1st title)
- Runners-up: Toronto FC
- Semifinalists: Colorado Rapids; Montreal Impact

Tournament statistics
- Matches played: 17
- Goals scored: 50 (2.94 per match)
- Attendance: 472,461 (27,792 per match)
- Top goal scorer(s): (United States) Jozy Altidore (5 goals)

The 2016 MLS Cup playoffs (branded as the Audi 2016 MLS Cup Playoffs for sponsorship reasons) began on October 26, and ended on December 10 with MLS Cup 2016, the 21st league championship match for MLS. This was the 21st version of the MLS Cup playoffs, the tournament culminating the Major League Soccer regular season.

Twelve teams (the top six per conference) competed. The first round of each conference had the third-seeded team hosting the sixth seed, while the fourth-seed hosted the fifth in a single match to determine who advanced to the conference semifinals. In the conference semifinals, the top seed played the lowest remaining seed, while the second played the next-lowest. The winners advanced to the conference finals. Both the conference semifinals and conference finals were played as two-legged aggregate series, with the higher-seeded team hosting the second leg. The winners advanced to the MLS Cup, a single match hosted by the participant with the better regular season record.

Seattle Sounders FC defeated Toronto FC 5–4 on penalties at BMO Field in Toronto, Ontario to win their first-ever MLS Cup. The game ended scoreless after extra time. It was the first MLS Cup in league history that two expansion teams participated in the final. It was also the first time in the league's history that a Canadian MLS team competed in the MLS Cup.

== Qualified teams ==
The top six teams from each conference advanced to the MLS Cup playoffs.

Eastern Conference

Pos	Team	Pld	Pts
1	New York Red Bulls	34	57
2	New York City FC	34	54
3	Toronto FC	34	53
4	D.C. United	34	46
5	Montreal Impact	34	45
6	Philadelphia Union	34	42
7	New England Revolution	34	42
8	Orlando City SC	34	41
9	Columbus Crew SC	34	36
10	Chicago Fire	34	31

Source: MLS

Western Conference

Pos	Team	Pld	Pts
1	FC Dallas	34	60
2	Colorado Rapids	34	58
3	LA Galaxy	34	52
4	Seattle Sounders FC	34	48
5	Sporting Kansas City	34	47
6	Real Salt Lake	34	46
7	Portland Timbers	34	44
8	Vancouver Whitecaps FC	34	39
9	San Jose Earthquakes	34	38
10	Houston Dynamo	34	34

Source: MLS

== Bracket ==
Knockout round	Conference semifinals
E5	Montreal Impact	1	2	3
October 27 – Washington, D.C.
E1	New York Red Bulls	0	1	1
E4	D.C. United	2
E5	Montreal Impact	4
Eastern Conference
E3	Toronto FC	2	5	7
October 26 – Toronto, Ontario
E2	New York City FC	0	0	0
E3	Toronto FC	3
E6	Philadelphia Union	1
W4	Seattle Sounders FC	3	1	4
October 27 – Seattle, Washington
W1	FC Dallas	0	2	2
W4	Seattle Sounders FC	1
W5	Sporting Kansas City	0
Western Conference
W3	LA Galaxy	1	0	1 (1)
October 26 – Carson, California
W2	Colorado Rapids (p)	0	1	1 (3)
W3	LA Galaxy	3
W6	Real Salt Lake	1

Conference finals
E5	Montreal Impact	3	2	5
E3	Toronto FC (a.e.t.)	2	5	7
W4	Seattle Sounders FC	2	1	3
W2	Colorado Rapids	1	0	1

MLS Cup; December 10 – Toronto, Ontario
E3	Toronto FC	0 (4)
W4	Seattle Sounders FC (p)	0 (5)

== Knockout round ==
=== Summary ===
Team 1	Score	Team 2
Eastern Conference
Toronto FC	3–1	Philadelphia Union
D.C. United	2–4	Montreal Impact
Western Conference
LA Galaxy	3–1	Real Salt Lake
Seattle Sounders FC	1–0	Sporting Kansas City

=== Eastern Conference ===
October 26
7:30 pm EDT

Toronto FC	3–1	Philadelphia Union
Giovinco 15'; Osorio 48'; Altidore 85'	Report	Bedoya 73'

BMO Field, Toronto, Ontario
Attendance: 21,759
Referee: Baldomero Toledo

October 27
7:30 pm EDT

D.C. United	2–4	Montreal Impact
Neagle 90'; Kemp 90+4'	Report	Ciman 4'; Mancosu 43', 58'; Piatti 83'

RFK Stadium, Washington, D.C.
Attendance: 12,773
Referee: Jair Marrufo

=== Western Conference ===
October 26
7:30 pm PDT

LA Galaxy	3–1	Real Salt Lake
Gordon 14'; Boateng 26', 34'	Report	Plata 21' (pen.)

StubHub Center, Carson, California
Attendance: 18,124
Referee: Alan Kelly

October 27
7:00 pm PDT

Seattle Sounders FC	1–0	Sporting Kansas City
Valdez 88'	Report

CenturyLink Field, Seattle, Washington
Attendance: 36,151
Referee: Ismail Elfath

== Conference semifinals ==
=== Summary ===
Team 1	Agg.	Team 2	1st leg	2nd leg
Eastern Conference
Toronto FC	7–0	New York City FC	2–0	5–0
Montreal Impact	3–1	New York Red Bulls	1–0	2–1
Western Conference
LA Galaxy	1–1 (1–3 p)	Colorado Rapids	1–0	0–1 (a.e.t.)
Seattle Sounders FC	4–2	FC Dallas	3–0	1–2

=== Eastern Conference ===
October 30
7:00 pm EDT

Toronto FC	2–0	New York City FC
Altidore 84'; Ricketts 90+2'	Report

BMO Field, Toronto, Ontario
Attendance: 28,220
Referee: Silviu Petrescu
November 6
6:30 pm EST

New York City FC	0–5	Toronto FC
	Report	Giovinco 6', 20' (pen.), 90+1'; Altidore 30'; Osorio 50'

Yankee Stadium, New York City, New York
Attendance: 28,355
Referee: Kevin Stott

Toronto FC won 7–0 on aggregate.

October 30
3:00 pm EDT

Montreal Impact	1–0	New York Red Bulls
Mancosu 61'	Report

Saputo Stadium, Montreal, Quebec
Attendance: 15,027
Referee: Robert Sibiga
November 6
4:00 pm EST

New York Red Bulls	1–2	Montreal Impact
Wright-Phillips 77'	Report	Piatti 51', 85'

Red Bull Arena, Harrison, New Jersey
Attendance: 24,314
Referee: Baldomero Toledo

Montreal Impact won 3–1 on aggregate.

=== Western Conference ===
October 30
2:00 pm PDT

LA Galaxy	1–0	Colorado Rapids
Dos Santos 55'	Report

StubHub Center, Carson, California
Attendance: 24,487
Referee: Drew Fischer
November 6
12:00 pm MST

Colorado Rapids	1–0 (a.e.t.)	LA Galaxy
Gashi 36'	Report
Penalties
Doyle (penalty scored); Le Toux (penalty scored); Pappa (penalty scored)	3–1	(penalty scored) Gerrard; (penalty missed) Dos Santos; (penalty missed) Cole; (penalty missed) Larentowicz

Dick's Sporting Goods Park, Commerce City, Colorado
Attendance: 17,782
Referee: Mark Geiger

1–1 on aggregate. Colorado Rapids won 3–1 on penalties.

October 30
6:30 pm PDT

Seattle Sounders FC	3–0	FC Dallas
Valdez 50'; Lodeiro 55', 58'	Report

CenturyLink Field, Seattle, Washington
Attendance: 37,073
Referee: Ricardo Salazar
November 6
8:00 pm CST

FC Dallas	2–1	Seattle Sounders FC
Akindele 25'; Urruti 56'	Report	Lodeiro 54'

Toyota Stadium, Frisco, Texas
Attendance: 14,878
Referee: Hilario Grajeda

Seattle Sounders FC won 4–2 on aggregate.

== Conference finals ==
=== Summary ===
Team 1	Agg.	Team 2	1st leg	2nd leg
Eastern Conference
Montreal Impact	5–7	Toronto FC	3–2	2–5 (a.e.t.)
Western Conference
Seattle Sounders FC	3–1	Colorado Rapids	2–1	1–0

=== Eastern Conference ===
November 22
8:00 pm EST

Montreal Impact	3–2	Toronto FC
Oduro 10'; Mancosu 12'; Oyongo 53'	Report	Altidore 68'; Bradley 73'

Olympic Stadium, Montreal, Quebec
Attendance: 61,004
Referee: Juan Guzman
November 30
7:00 pm EST

Toronto FC	5–2 (a.e.t.)	Montreal Impact
Cooper 37'; Altidore 45'; Hagglund 68'; Cheyrou 98'; Ricketts 100'	Report	Oduro 24'; Piatti 53'

BMO Field, Toronto, Ontario
Attendance: 36,000
Referee: Jair Marrufo

Toronto FC won 7–5 on aggregate.

=== Western Conference ===
November 22
7:35 pm PST

Seattle Sounders FC	2–1	Colorado Rapids
Morris 19'; Lodeiro 61' (pen.)	Report	Doyle 13'

CenturyLink Field, Seattle, Washington
Attendance: 42,774
Referee: Chris Penso
November 27
2:00 pm MST

Colorado Rapids	0–1	Seattle Sounders FC
	Report	Morris 56'

Dick's Sporting Goods Park, Commerce City, Colorado
Attendance: 17,695
Referee: Ricardo Salazar

Seattle Sounders FC won 3–1 on aggregate.

== MLS Cup 2016 ==
December 10, 2016
8:00 p.m. EST

Toronto FC	0–0 (a.e.t.)	Seattle Sounders FC
	Report
Penalties
Altidore (penalty scored); Bradley (penalty missed); Cheyrou (penalty scored); Johnson (penalty scored); Moor (penalty scored); Morrow (penalty missed)	4–5	(penalty scored) Evans; (penalty scored) Ivanschitz; (penalty missed) Fernández; (penalty scored) J. Jones; (penalty scored) Lodeiro; (penalty scored) Torres

BMO Field, Toronto, Ontario
Attendance: 36,045
Referee: Alan Kelly

== Top goalscorers ==
Rank	Player	Club	Goals
1	(United States) Jozy Altidore	Toronto FC	5
2	(Italy) Sebastian Giovinco	Toronto FC	4
2	(Uruguay) Nicolás Lodeiro	Seattle Sounders FC	4
2	(Italy) Matteo Mancosu	Montreal Impact	4
2	(Argentina) Ignacio Piatti	Montreal Impact	4
6	(Ghana) Emmanuel Boateng	LA Galaxy	2
6	(United States) Jordan Morris	Seattle Sounders FC	2
6	(Ghana) Dominic Oduro	Montreal Impact	2
6	(Canada) Jonathan Osorio	Toronto FC	2
6	(Canada) Tosaint Ricketts	Toronto FC	2
6	(Paraguay) Nelson Valdez	Seattle Sounders FC	2
