= MLS Cup playoffs =

Annual postseason elimination tournament of Major League Soccer

- Founded: 1996
- Region: United States; Canada
- Teams: 18
- Current champions: Inter Miami CF (1st title)
- Most championships: LA Galaxy (6 titles)
- 2026 MLS Cup playoffs

The MLS Cup playoffs is the annual postseason elimination tournament of Major League Soccer. The MLS Cup, the league's championship game, is the final match of the tournament. Under the current format adopted for the 2023 season, 18 teams qualify for the tournament based on regular-season point totals — the nine highest-placed teams from each the Eastern Conference and the Western Conference. Audi is the title sponsor of this tournament.

Awarding a championship through a postseason tournament is standard in most U.S.-based leagues. However, it differs from most other soccer leagues around the world, where the team with the most points at the end of the season is deemed champion. MLS awards the regular-season champions with the Supporters' Shield and both champions earn a berth in the CONCACAF Champions Cup, the continental tournament.

== Playoff system ==
Since 2023, the top nine teams from each of the Eastern and Western Conference qualify for the playoffs, playing in separate brackets. The wild-card round, conference semifinals, conference finals, and the MLS Cup are single-match eliminations hosted by the team with the better regular season record, while round one is a best-of-3 series with the higher seeds hosting the odd-numbered games with no re-seeding in any round. A penalty shoot-out is used if the teams are still tied in all games while extra time (divided into two 15-minute periods) is utilized from conference semifinals onwards.

The teams ranked 8th and 9th in each conference compete in the Wild-card round, with the winner advancing to Round One against the first-place team in the conference. The other six teams play each other using the highest v. lowest matchups: 2 v 7, 3 v 6, and 4 v 5. The winners of the first-round series advance to the conference semifinals, then the conference finals, and finally the MLS Cup, a single match hosted by the finalist with the better regular-season record.

Previously, the top seven teams per conference qualified for the playoffs, with only the team with the best regular-season record in each conference earning a first-round bye to the conference semifinals. Due to the COVID-19 pandemic, the top ten teams from the Eastern and top eight teams from the Western conference qualified for the playoffs in the 2020 season, with single-elimination remaining intact. The top six Eastern teams earned byes to the first round while teams seeded 7–10 and competed in play-in games. The lowest-ranked team to advance from the play-in round advanced to play the conference's first-placed team while the highest-ranked remaining team from that round advanced to face the conference's runner-up. In the Western Conference, the top eight teams competed in their first round with no byes.

The conference semifinals and conference finals were formerly conducted in a home-and-away, aggregate-goal format. From 2014 to 2018, the away goals rule was used for these rounds. In both rounds, the higher-seeded team hosted the second leg. If the teams were tied after two games (180 minutes), the team that scored more goals on the road advanced. If there was still a tie after the away goals rule had been applied, the teams played 30 minutes of extra time (divided into two 15-minute periods), followed by a penalty shoot-out if necessary. The away goals rule did not apply to goals scored in these extra periods.

== Qualification ==
Eighteen teams qualify for the playoffs: the top nine teams from the Eastern Conference and the Western Conference that had earned the best points per game record during the 34-game regular season. The top seven teams in each conference get a first-round bye, advancing to the conference quarterfinals.

=== Tie-breaking procedures ===
If at least two teams finish the regular season with an equal number of points, the following criteria are used to break the tie, with coin tosses (two teams) or drawing of lots (at least three teams) used if all of those below fail.

- Most wins
- Higher goal differential
- Higher goals scored
- Fewer disciplinary points
- Higher away goal differential
- Higher away goals scored
- Higher home goal differential
- Higher home goals scored

Note:

- If two clubs remain tied after another club with the same number of points advances during any step, the tie breaker reverts to step 1 for the two remaining clubs.
- Head-to-head competition results have not been used in tie-breakers since 2012.

== History ==
| Seasons | League teams | Playoff teams | % of teams | Matches played |
|---|---|---|---|---|
| 1996–1997 | 10 | 8 | 80% | 13–19 (Note: Teams played either a best-of-3 first round (1996–1999, 2023–2025) or a points-based series with the first team to 5 points advancing (2000–2002), leading to a variable number of matches played each year depending on whether the 3rd game was required for each matchup.) |
| 1998–2001 | 12 | 8 | 66.7% | 13–19 |
| 2002 | 10 | 8 | 80% | 13–19 |
| 2003–2004 | 10 | 8 | 80% | 11 |
| 2005–2006 | 12 | 8 | 66.7% | 11 |
| 2007 | 13 | 8 | 61.5% | 11 |
| 2008 | 14 | 8 | 57.1% | 11 |
| 2009 | 15 | 8 | 53.3% | 11 |
| 2010 | 16 | 8 | 50% | 11 |
| 2011 | 18 | 10 | 55.6% | 13 |
| 2012–2014 | 19 | 10 | 52.6% | 15 |
| 2015–2016 | 20 | 12 | 60% | 17 |
| 2017 | 22 | 12 | 54.5% | 17 |
| 2018 | 23 | 12 | 52.2% | 17 |
| 2019 | 24 | 14 | 58.3% | 13 |
| 2020 | 26 | 18 (Note: Temporarily expanded due to the shortened regular season.) | 69.2% | 17 |
| 2021 | 27 | 14 | 51.9% | 13 |
| 2022 | 28 | 14 | 50% | 13 |
| 2023–2024 | 29 | 18 | 62.1% | 25–33 |
| 2025–2026 | 30 | 18 | 60% | 25–33 |
| 2027 | 30 | 16 | 53.3% | 15 |

== MLS playoff records ==
- Records include all knockout playoff matches, individual legs of aggregate-goal rounds, and MLS Cup appearances.

=== Goals ===
Note: Players in bold are still active for an MLS club.

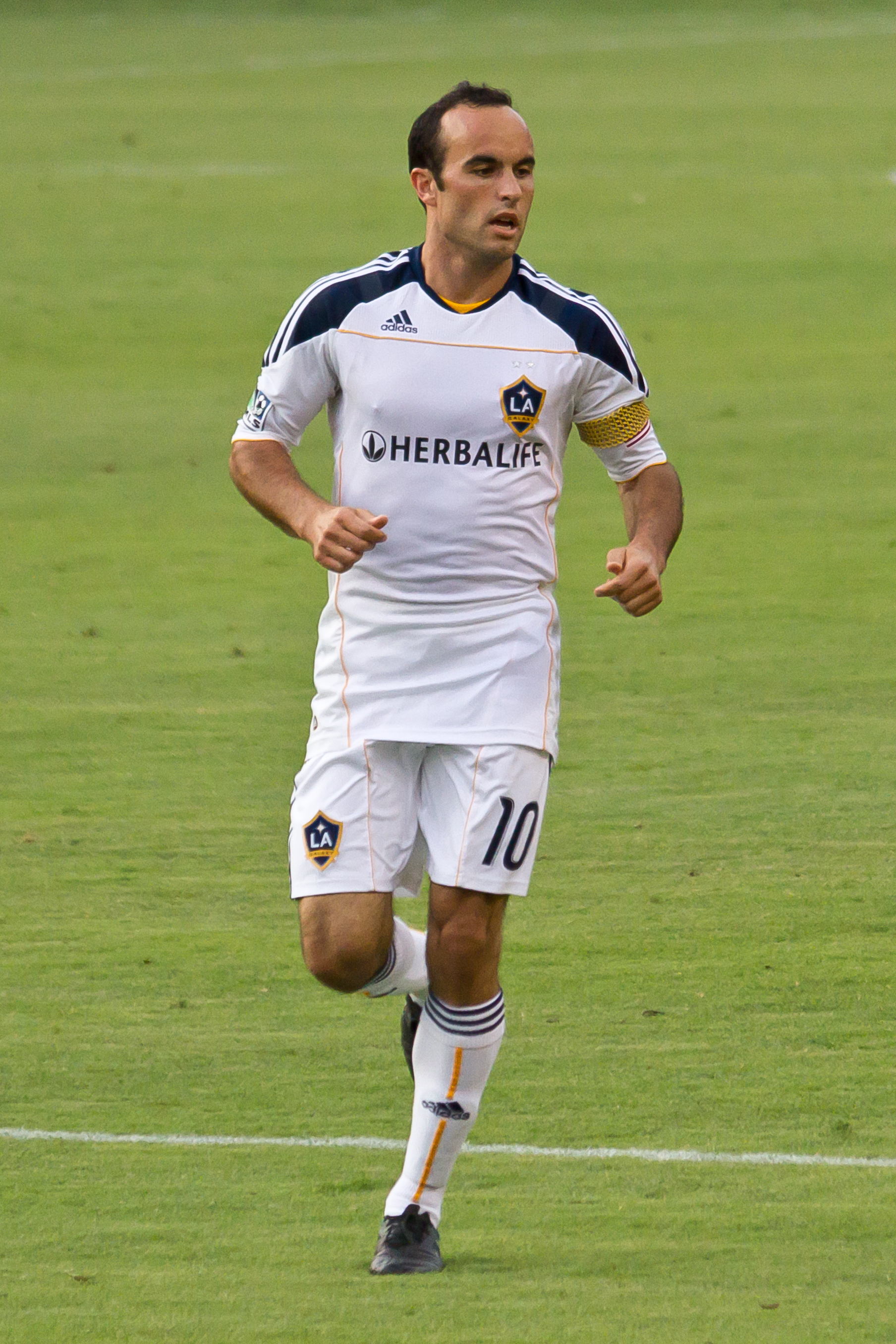
Landon Donovan has the most goals in MLS playoff history.

| Rank | Player | Years | Goals |
|---|---|---|---|
| 1 | (United States) Landon Donovan | 2001–2014; 2016 | 25 |
| 2 | (Guatemala) Carlos Ruiz | 2002–2008; 2011; 2013; 2016 | 16 |
| 3 | (United States) Roy Lassiter | 1996–1999; 2001–2002 | 13 |
| 4 | (Bolivia) Jaime Moreno | 1996–2010 | 12 |
| 5 | (United States) **Jordan Morris** | 2016–present | 11 |
| 5 | (United States) Ante Razov | 1996–2009 | 11 |
| 7 | (Gabon) **Denis Bouanga** | 2022–present | 10 |
| 7 | (United States) Brian McBride | 1996–2003; 2008–2010 | 10 |
| 7 | (United States) Preki | 1996–2005 | 10 |
| 7 | (United States) Taylor Twellman | 2002–2010 | 10 |

=== Most goals by season ===
| Season | Player(s) | Club(s) | Goals |
|---|---|---|---|
| 1996 | (El Salvador) Raúl Díaz Arce | D.C. United | 6 |
| 1996 | (United States) Roy Lassiter (1) | Tampa Bay Mutiny | 6 |
| 1997 | (United States) Paul Bravo | Colorado Rapids | 3 |
| 1997 | (Bolivia) Jaime Moreno (1) | D.C. United | 3 |
| 1997 | (United States) Tony Sanneh | D.C. United | 3 |
| 1998 | (United States) Roy Lassiter (2) | D.C. United | 4 |
| 1998 | (United States) Brian McBride | Columbus Crew | 4 |
| 1999 | (Argentina) Ariel Graziani | Dallas Burn | 5 |
| 1999 | (Trinidad and Tobago) Stern John | Columbus Crew | 5 |
| 1999 | (Bolivia) Jaime Moreno (2) | D.C. United | 5 |
| 2000 | (Denmark) Miklos Molnar | Kansas City Wizards | 5 |
| 2001 | (United States) Landon Donovan (1) | San Jose Earthquakes | 5 |
| 2002 | (Guatemala) Carlos Ruiz | Los Angeles Galaxy | 8 |
| 2003 | (United States) Landon Donovan (2) | San Jose Earthquakes | 4 |
| 2004 | (United States) Alecko Eskandarian | D.C. United | 4 |
| 2005 | (United States) Landon Donovan (3) | Los Angeles Galaxy | 4 |
| 2006 | (United States) Brian Ching | Houston Dynamo | 3 |
| 2006 | (United States) Taylor Twellman (1) | New England Revolution | 3 |
| 2007 | (United States) Taylor Twellman (2) | New England Revolution | 3 |
| 2008 | (Colombia) Juan Pablo Ángel | New York Red Bulls | 2 |
| 2008 | (United States) Chad Marshall | Columbus Crew | 2 |
| 2008 | (United States) John Wolyniec | New York Red Bulls | 2 |
| 2009 | (United States) Landon Donovan (4) | Los Angeles Galaxy | 3 |
| 2009 | (United States) Robbie Findley | Real Salt Lake | 3 |
| 2010 | (United States) Edson Buddle | Los Angeles Galaxy | 2 |
| 2010 | (United States) Conor Casey | Colorado Rapids | 2 |
| 2010 | (United States) Bobby Convey | San Jose Earthquakes | 2 |
| 2010 | (Colombia) David Ferreira | FC Dallas | 2 |
| 2011 | (United States) Landon Donovan (5) | Los Angeles Galaxy | 3 |
| 2011 | (United States) Mike Magee | Los Angeles Galaxy | 3 |
| 2011 | (Costa Rica) Álvaro Saborío | Real Salt Lake | 3 |
| 2012 | (Republic of Ireland) Robbie Keane | Los Angeles Galaxy | 6 |
| 2013 | (France) Aurélien Collin | Sporting Kansas City | 3 |
| 2014 | (United States) Charlie Davies | New England Revolution | 4 |
| 2014 | (England) Bradley Wright-Phillips | New York Red Bulls | 4 |
| 2015 | (Sierra Leone) Kei Kamara | Columbus Crew | 4 |
| 2016 | (United States) Jozy Altidore | Toronto FC | 5 |
| 2017 | (United States) Clint Dempsey | Seattle Sounders FC | 3 |
| 2018 | (Venezuela) Josef Martínez | Atlanta United FC | 4 |
| 2018 | (Argentina) Diego Valeri | Portland Timbers | 4 |
| 2019 | (Peru) Raúl Ruidíaz | Seattle Sounders FC | 4 |
| 2020 | (Trinidad and Tobago) Kevin Molino | Minnesota United FC | 4 |
| 2021 | (Argentina) Valentín Castellanos | New York City FC | 3 |
| 2021 | (Germany) Hany Mukhtar | Nashville SC | 3 |
| 2022 | (Argentina) Sebastián Driussi | Austin FC | 3 |
| 2022 | (Argentina) Maximiliano Moralez | New York City FC | 3 |
| 2023 | (Gabon) Denis Bouanga | Los Angeles FC | 5 |
| 2023 | (Colombia) Cucho Hernández | Columbus Crew | 5 |
| 2024 | (Serbia) Dejan Joveljić | Los Angeles Galaxy | 6 |
| 2025 | (Argentina) Tadeo Allende | Inter Miami CF | 9 |

=== Most goals in MLS Cup finals ===
Note: Players in bold are still active for an MLS club. Finals in italics indicate an all-time record for a single final match.

| Rank | Player | Finals scored in | Goals |
|---|---|---|---|
| 1 | (United States) Landon Donovan | 2001, 2003, 2011, 2012 | 5 |
| 2 | (United States) Jozy Altidore | 2017, 2019 | 2 |
| 2 | (Canada) Dwayne De Rosario | 2001, 2007 | 2 |
| 2 | (England) **Jack Elliott** | 2022 | 2 |
| 2 | (United States) Alecko Eskandarian | 2004 | 2 |
| 2 | (Republic of Ireland) Robbie Keane | 2012, 2014 | 2 |
| 2 | (Bolivia) Jaime Moreno | 1997, 1999 | 2 |
| 2 | (United States) Tony Sanneh | 1996, 1997 | 2 |
| 2 | (United States) Taylor Twellman | 2006, 2007 | 2 |
| 2 | (Armenia) Lucas Zelarayán | 2020 | 2 |

=== Club records and appearances ===
- Single-elimination matches decided by a penalty shoot-out are counted as draws.
- Matches decided by a penalty shoot-out in best-of-three series are counted as a win/loss based on the shoot-out's outcome.

As of the conclusion of 2025 MLS Cup playoffs

Teams in bold took part in the 2025 MLS Cup playoffs

Defunct team

MLS Cup club records and appearances
| Club | MLS Cups | MLS Cup apps | Wins | Losses | Draws |
|---|---|---|---|---|---|
| Atlanta United FC | 1 | 1 | 9 | 7 | 2 |
| **Austin FC** | 0 | 0 | 1 | 3 | 1 |
| CF Montreal | 0 | 0 | 7 | 5 | 1 |
| **Charlotte FC** | 0 | 0 | 2 | 5 | 0 |
| **Chicago Fire FC** | 1 | 3 | 22 | 19 | 6 |
| Chivas USA | 0 | 0 | 1 | 4 | 3 |
| Colorado Rapids | 1 | 2 | 12 | 26 | 5 |
| **Columbus Crew** | 3 | 4 | 29 | 29 | 7 |
| D.C. United | 4 | 5 | 26 | 15 | 7 |
| **FC Cincinnati** | 0 | 0 | 7 | 6 | 0 |
| **FC Dallas** | 0 | 1 | 15 | 29 | 10 |
| Houston Dynamo FC | 2 | 4 | 19 | 14 | 7 |
| **Inter Miami CF** | 1 | 1 | 6 | 5 | 0 |
| LA Galaxy | 6 | 10 | 50 | 24 | 7 |
| **Los Angeles FC** | 1 | 2 | 11 | 6 | 2 |
| Miami Fusion | 0 | 0 | 3 | 7 | 0 |
| **Minnesota United FC** | 0 | 0 | 6 | 6 | 1 |
| **Nashville SC** | 0 | 0 | 4 | 6 | 1 |
| New England Revolution | 0 | 5 | 20 | 19 | 10 |
| **New York City FC** | 1 | 1 | 11 | 11 | 3 |
| New York Red Bulls | 0 | 2 | 24 | 34 | 8 |
| **Orlando City SC** | 0 | 0 | 5 | 7 | 1 |
| **Philadelphia Union** | 0 | 1 | 8 | 9 | 2 |
| **Portland Timbers** | 1 | 3 | 13 | 9 | 7 |
| **Real Salt Lake** | 1 | 2 | 11 | 16 | 10 |
| **San Diego FC** | 0 | 0 | 3 | 2 | 0 |
| San Jose Earthquakes | 2 | 2 | 12 | 12 | 3 |
| **Seattle Sounders FC** | 2 | 4 | 28 | 18 | 7 |
| Sporting Kansas City | 2 | 3 | 21 | 25 | 12 |
| St. Louis City SC | 0 | 0 | 0 | 2 | 0 |
| Tampa Bay Mutiny | 0 | 0 | 2 | 9 | 0 |
| Toronto FC | 1 | 3 | 10 | 5 | 2 |
| **Vancouver Whitecaps FC** | 0 | 1 | 6 | 10 | 3 |

- Miami Fusion and Tampa Bay Mutiny folded after the completion of the 2001 season.
- Chivas USA folded after the completion of the 2014 season.

=== Appearances ===
As of November 7, 2026

Defunct team

MLS playoff appearance records
| Club | MLS playoff appearances | Active streak | Longest streak |
|---|---|---|---|
| Atlanta United FC | 6 | 0 | 3 |
| Austin FC | 2 | 0 | 1 |
| Charlotte FC | 4 | 4 | 4 |
| Chicago Fire FC | 15 | 2 | 6 |
| Chivas USA | 4 | 0 | 4 |
| Colorado Rapids | 16 | 0 | 5 |
| Columbus Crew | 20 | 4 | 4 |
| D.C. United | 15 | 0 | 4 |
| FC Cincinnati | 5 | 5 | 5 |
| FC Dallas | 22 | 2 | 7 |
| Houston Dynamo FC | 11 | 1 | 4 |
| Inter Miami CF | 5 | 3 | 3 |
| LA Galaxy | 21 | 0 | 10 |
| Los Angeles FC | 8 | 5 | 5 |
| Miami Fusion | 3 | 0 | 2 |
| Minnesota United FC | 6 | 0 | 4 |
| CF Montréal | 6 | 0 | 2 |
| Nashville SC | 6 | 2 | 4 |
| New England Revolution | 18 | 1 | 8 |
| New York City FC | 9 | 0 | 7 |
| New York Red Bulls | 25 | 0 | 15 |
| Orlando City SC | 7 | 7 | 7 |
| Philadelphia Union | 10 | 2 | 6 |
| Portland Timbers | 10 | 3 | 5 |
| Real Salt Lake | 16 | 6 | 7 |
| San Diego FC | 1 | 0 | 1 |
| San Jose Earthquakes | 12 | 1 | 5 |
| Seattle Sounders FC | 17 | 4 | 13 |
| Sporting Kansas City | 20 | 0 | 8 |
| St. Louis City SC | 2 | 1 | 1 |
| Tampa Bay Mutiny | 4 | 0 | 2 |
| Toronto FC | 5 | 0 | 3 |
| Vancouver Whitecaps FC | 9 | 4 | 4 |

- Miami Fusion and Tampa Bay Mutiny folded after the completion of the 2001 season.
- Chivas USA folded after the completion of the 2014 season.

=== MLS Cup playoffs shoot-outs ===
Won
Lost
- MLS began implementing a shoot-out to determine the winner of a playoff series in 2004.
- From 2014 to 2018 the away goals rule was used (but not in extra time).

As of November 19, 2026

Longest MLS Cup playoffs shoot-outs
| Rank | Rounds | Home team | Score | Away team | Season / stage |
|---|---|---|---|---|---|
| 1 | 11 | Portland Timbers | 2–2 (7–6) | Sporting Kansas City | 2015 knockout round |
| 2 | 10 | Sporting Kansas City | 1–1 (7–6) | Real Salt Lake | 2013 MLS Cup |
| 2 | 10 | New York Red Bulls | 1–1 (7–8) | FC Cincinnati | 2023 round one |
| 2 | 10 | Minnesota United FC | 3–3 (7–6) | Seattle Sounders FC | 2025 round one |
| 5 | 9 | FC Cincinnati | 0–0 (5–6) | New York City FC | 2024 round one |
| 6 | 8 | Portland Timbers | 1–1 (7–8) | FC Dallas | 2020 first round |
| 6 | 8 | New York City FC | 0–0 (6–7) | Charlotte FC | 2025 round one |
| 8 | 7 | Chicago Fire | 0–0 (4–5) | Real Salt Lake | 2009 conference finals |
| 8 | 7 | Real Salt Lake | 1–1 (5–4) | Los Angeles Galaxy | 2009 MLS Cup † |
| 8 | 7 | Orlando City SC | 1–1 (6–5) | New York City FC | 2020 first round |
| 8 | 7 | New York Red Bulls | 1–1 (5–4) | Columbus Crew | 2024 round one |
| 8 | 7 | Houston Dynamo FC | 1–1 (6–7) | Seattle Sounders FC | 2024 round one |
**5** games have been decided in 6 rounds **17** games have been decided in 5 rounds **12** games have been decided in 4 rounds **1** game has been decided in 3 rounds

† Game played at neutral location

== See also ==
- MLS Cup
- Playoffs
- List of MLS club post-season droughts
