= 2020 MLS Cup playoffs =

2020 edition of the MLS Cup playoffs tournament

Tournament details
- Country: United States
- Dates: November 20 – December 12
- Teams: 18

Final positions
- Champions: Columbus Crew SC (2nd title)
- Runners-up: Seattle Sounders FC
- Semifinalists: Minnesota United FC; New England Revolution

Tournament statistics
- Matches played: 17
- Goals scored: 50 (2.94 per match)
- Top goal scorer(s): (Trinidad and Tobago) Kevin Molino (4 goals)

The 2020 MLS Cup playoffs (branded as the Audi 2020 MLS Cup Playoffs for sponsorship reasons) was the 25th edition of the MLS Cup playoffs, the post-season championship of Major League Soccer (MLS), the top soccer league in the United States and Canada. The tournament culminated the 2020 MLS regular season. The playoffs began on November 20 and concluded with MLS Cup 2020 on December 12.

On October 29, the league announced that the final regular season standings and playoff qualification would be determined by points per game rather than by overall points. This was due to eight MLS clubs, all in the Western Conference, being unable to play all of their scheduled 23 regular season matches in time due to the COVID-19 pandemic. Seven postponed matches were cancelled altogether in order for the playoffs to be able to start on the scheduled date. A twelve-day break between Decision Day and the start of the playoffs was added to accommodate an international break; MLS waived quarantine requirements for players who returned on charter flights, but several positive cases affected the opening rounds.

The 2020 regular season Supporters' Shield champions were the Philadelphia Union, who were eliminated in the first round by the New England Revolution.

Seattle Sounders FC were the defending MLS Cup champions, having won their second title in 2019. They were beaten by Columbus Crew SC 3–0 in the MLS Cup final. As a result, Columbus Crew SC earned their second MLS Cup title, and first since 2008.

== Qualified teams ==
Eastern Conference

- Columbus Crew SC
- Inter Miami CF
- Montreal Impact
- Nashville SC
- New England Revolution
- New York City FC
- New York Red Bulls
- Orlando City SC
- Philadelphia Union
- Toronto FC

Western Conference

- Colorado Rapids
- FC Dallas
- Los Angeles FC
- Minnesota United FC
- Portland Timbers
- San Jose Earthquakes
- Seattle Sounders FC
- Sporting Kansas City

== Conference standings ==
The top ten teams in the Eastern Conference and the top eight teams in the Western Conference advanced to the MLS Cup playoffs, with the teams ranked seventh to tenth in the East going through an initial play-in round. Background colors denote playoff teams, with green also qualifying for the 2021 CONCACAF Champions League, and blue also qualifying for the 2021 Leagues Cup. The Portland Timbers and non-playoff Atlanta United FC qualified for the 2021 CONCACAF Champions League as winners of the MLS is Back Tournament and 2019 U.S. Open Cup, respectively. Toronto FC qualified after being nominated by Canada Soccer by virtue of being the MLS finalists of the 2020 Canadian Championship.

Eastern Conference

| Pos | Team | Pld | Pts | PPG |
|---|---|---|---|---|
| 1 | Philadelphia Union | 23 | 47 | 2.04 |
| 2 | Toronto FC | 23 | 44 | 1.91 |
| 3 | Columbus Crew SC (C) | 23 | 41 | 1.78 |
| 4 | Orlando City SC | 23 | 41 | 1.78 |
| 5 | New York City FC | 23 | 39 | 1.70 |
| 6 | New York Red Bulls | 23 | 32 | 1.39 |
| 7 | Nashville SC | 23 | 32 | 1.39 |
| 8 | New England Revolution | 23 | 32 | 1.39 |
| 9 | Montreal Impact | 23 | 26 | 1.13 |
| 10 | Inter Miami CF | 23 | 24 | 1.04 |

Source: MLS
(C) Champions

Western Conference

| Pos | Team | Pld | Pts | PPG |
|---|---|---|---|---|
| 1 | Sporting Kansas City | 21 | 39 | 1.86 |
| 2 | Seattle Sounders FC | 22 | 39 | 1.77 |
| 3 | Portland Timbers | 23 | 39 | 1.70 |
| 4 | Minnesota United FC | 21 | 34 | 1.62 |
| 5 | Colorado Rapids | 18 | 28 | 1.56 |
| 6 | FC Dallas | 22 | 34 | 1.55 |
| 7 | Los Angeles FC | 22 | 32 | 1.45 |
| 8 | San Jose Earthquakes | 23 | 30 | 1.30 |

Source: MLS

== Play-in round ==
This round was only applied to the Eastern Conference. The seventh-placed team, Nashville SC, played the tenth-placed team, Inter Miami CF, while the eighth-placed team, the New England Revolution, faced the ninth-placed team, the Montreal Impact. The lowest-ranked team to advance from this round, the New England Revolution, advanced to play the conference's first-placed team, the Philadelphia Union. The highest-ranked remaining team, Nashville SC, advanced to face the conference's second-placed team, Toronto FC.

November 20
6:30 pm EST

| New England Revolution | 2–1 | Montreal Impact |
|---|---|---|
| Gil 38'; Bou 90+5' | Report | Quioto 61' |

Gillette Stadium, Foxborough, Massachusetts
Attendance: 0 (Note: The match was held behind closed doors due to the COVID-19 pandemic in the United States.)
Referee: Jair Marrufo

November 20
8:00 pm CST

| Nashville SC | 3–0 | Inter Miami CF |
|---|---|---|
| Leal 14'; Mukhtar 24' (pen.); McCarty 57' | Report |

Nissan Stadium, Nashville, Tennessee
Attendance: 3,240 (Note: The match was held in restricted capacity due to the COVID-19 pandemic in the United States.)
Referee: Ismail Elfath

== Bracket ==
First round November 21–22, 24 | Conference semifinals November 29, December 1–3
E1 | Philadelphia Union | 0
E8 | New England Revolution | 2
E8 | New England Revolution | 3
E4 | Orlando City SC | 1
E4 | Orlando City SC (p) | 1 (6)
E5 | New York City FC | 1 (5)
Eastern Conference
E3 | Columbus Crew SC | 3
E6 | New York Red Bulls | 2
E3 | Columbus Crew SC (a.e.t.) | 2
E7 | Nashville SC | 0
E2 | Toronto FC | 0
E7 | Nashville SC (a.e.t.) | 1
W1 | Sporting Kansas City (p) | 3 (3)
W8 | San Jose Earthquakes | 3 (0)
W1 | Sporting Kansas City | 0
W4 | Minnesota United FC | 3
W4 | Minnesota United FC | 3
W5 | Colorado Rapids | 0
Western Conference
W3 | Portland Timbers | 1 (7)
W6 | FC Dallas (p) | 1 (8)
W6 | FC Dallas | 0
W2 | Seattle Sounders FC | 1
W2 | Seattle Sounders FC | 3
W7 | Los Angeles FC | 1

Conference finals December 6–7
E8 | New England Revolution | 0
E3 | Columbus Crew SC | 1
W4 | Minnesota United FC | 2
W2 | Seattle Sounders FC | 3

MLS Cup; December 12
E3 | Columbus Crew SC | 3
W2 | Seattle Sounders FC | 0

Note: The higher-seeded team hosted matches in the first three rounds. The team with the better regular season record hosted the final.
Source: 2020 MLS Cup Playoffs Bracket

== First round ==
The top four teams in each conference hosted the first round matches.

=== Eastern Conference ===
November 21
12:00 pm EST

| Orlando City SC | 1–1 (a.e.t.) | New York City FC |
|---|---|---|
| Nani 5' (pen.) | Report | Chanot 8' |
Penalties
| Akindele (penalty scored); Perea (penalty scored); Antônio Carlos (penalty scored); Urso (penalty scored); Nani (penalty missed); Jansson (penalty scored); Michel (penalty scored) | 6–5 | (penalty missed) Moralez; (penalty scored) Medina; (penalty scored) Rocha; (penalty scored) Tajouri-Shradi; (penalty scored) Castellanos; (penalty scored) Acevedo; (penalty missed) Þórarinsson |

Exploria Stadium, Orlando, Florida
Attendance: 6,250
Referee: Allen Chapman

November 21
3:00 pm EST

| Columbus Crew SC | 3–2 | New York Red Bulls |
|---|---|---|
| Pedro Santos 26' (pen.); Nagbe 46'; Zardes 68' | Report | Clark 23'; White 90' |

Mapfre Stadium, Columbus, Ohio
Attendance: 0
Referee: Alex Chilowicz

November 24
6:00 PM EST

| Toronto FC | 0–1 (a.e.t.) | Nashville SC |
|---|---|---|
| | Report | Ríos 108' |

Pratt & Whitney Stadium, East Hartford, Connecticut (Note: Toronto FC hosted their playoff match at Pratt & Whitney Stadium in East Hartford, Connecticut. BMO Field was not available due to travel restrictions between Canada and the United States.)
Attendance: 0
Referee: Robert Sibiga

November 24
8:00 pm EST

| Philadelphia Union | 0–2 | New England Revolution |
|---|---|---|
| | Report | Buksa 26'; Buchanan 30' |

Subaru Park, Chester, Pennsylvania
Attendance: 3,000
Referee: Joe Dickerson

=== Western Conference ===
November 22
3:00 pm CST

| Sporting Kansas City | 3–3 (a.e.t.) | San Jose Earthquakes |
|---|---|---|
| R. Espinoza 4'; Ilie 47'; Busio 90+1' | Report | Fierro 22'; Salinas 34'; Wondolowski 90+7' |
Penalties
| Russell (penalty scored); Ilie (penalty scored); Shelton (penalty scored) | 3–0 | (penalty missed) Alanís; (penalty missed) Yueill; (penalty missed) C. Espinoza |

Children's Mercy Park, Kansas City, Kansas
Attendance: 3,324
Referee: Nima Saghafi

November 22
6:30 pm CST

| Minnesota United FC | 3–0 | Colorado Rapids |
|---|---|---|
| Molino 22', 79'; Lod 54' | Report |

Allianz Field, Saint Paul, Minnesota
Attendance: 0
Referee: Ted Unkel

November 22
7:00 pm PST

| Portland Timbers | 1–1 (a.e.t.) | FC Dallas |
|---|---|---|
| Villafaña 82' | Report | Pepi 90+3' |
Penalties
| Valeri (penalty scored); Farfan (penalty scored); Župarić (penalty scored); Ebobisse (penalty scored); Bodily (penalty scored); D. Chará (penalty scored); Loría (penalty scored); Villafaña (penalty missed) | 7–8 | (penalty scored) Ziegler; (penalty scored) Jara; (penalty scored) Bressan; (penalty scored) Pepi; (penalty scored) Hollingshead; (penalty scored) Hedges; (penalty scored) Tessmann; (penalty scored) Twumasi |

Providence Park, Portland, Oregon
Attendance: 0
Referee: Armando Villarreal

November 24
7:30 pm PST

| Seattle Sounders FC | 3–1 | Los Angeles FC |
|---|---|---|
| Lodeiro 18'; Ruidíaz 66'; Morris 80' | Report | Atuesta 77' |

Lumen Field, Seattle, Washington
Attendance: 0
Referee: Kevin Stott

== Conference semifinals ==
The higher-seeded teams in each match-up hosted the tie.

=== Eastern Conference ===
November 29
3:00 pm EST

| Orlando City SC | 1–3 | New England Revolution |
|---|---|---|
| Urso 33' | Report | Gil 17' (pen.); Bou 25', 86' |

Exploria Stadium, Orlando, Florida
Referee: Alex Chilowicz

November 29
8:00 pm EST

| Columbus Crew SC | 2–0 (a.e.t.) | Nashville SC |
|---|---|---|
| Pedro Santos 99'; Zardes 103' | Report |

Mapfre Stadium, Columbus, Ohio
Attendance: 0
Referee: Armando Villarreal

=== Western Conference ===
December 1
6:30 pm PST

| Seattle Sounders FC | 1–0 | FC Dallas |
|---|---|---|
| O'Neill 49' | Report |

Lumen Field, Seattle, Washington
Attendance: 0
Referee: Robert Sibiga

December 3
7:00 pm CST

| Sporting Kansas City | 0–3 | Minnesota United FC |
|---|---|---|
| | Report | Molino 27', 35'; Dibassy 39' |

Children's Mercy Park, Kansas City, Kansas
Attendance: 3,324
Referee: Drew Fischer

== Conference finals ==
The higher-seeded teams in each conference hosted the matches.

=== Eastern Conference ===
December 6
3:00 pm EST

| Columbus Crew SC | 1–0 | New England Revolution |
|---|---|---|
| Artur 59' | Report |

Mapfre Stadium, Columbus, Ohio
Attendance: 1,500
Referee: Armando Villarreal

=== Western Conference ===
December 7
6:30 pm PST

| Seattle Sounders FC | 3–2 | Minnesota United FC |
|---|---|---|
| Bruin 75'; Ruidíaz 89'; Svensson 90+3' | Report | Reynoso 29'; Dibassy 67' |

Lumen Field, Seattle, Washington
Attendance: 0
Referee: Ismail Elfath

== MLS Cup 2020 ==
As the highest-ranked team remaining in the overall table, Columbus Crew SC hosted the match.

December 12, 2020
8:30 PM EST

| Columbus Crew SC | 3–0 | Seattle Sounders FC |
|---|---|---|
| Zelarayán 25', 82'; Etienne 31' | Report |

Mapfre Stadium, Columbus, Ohio
Attendance: 1,500
Referee: Jair Marrufo

== Top goalscorers ==
There were 50 goals scored in 17 matches, for an average of 2.94 goals per match.

| Rank | Player | Club | Goals |
|---|---|---|---|
| 1 | (Trinidad and Tobago) Kevin Molino | Minnesota United FC | 4 |
| 2 | (Argentina) Gustavo Bou | New England Revolution | 3 |
| 3 | (Mali) Bakaye Dibassy | Minnesota United FC | 2 |
| 3 | (Spain) Carles Gil | New England Revolution | 2 |
| 3 | (Peru) Raúl Ruidíaz | Seattle Sounders FC | 2 |
| 3 | (Portugal) Pedro Santos | Columbus Crew SC | 2 |
| 3 | (United States) Gyasi Zardes | Columbus Crew SC | 2 |
| 3 | (Armenia) Lucas Zelarayán | Columbus Crew SC | 2 |
