= 2009 MLS Cup playoffs =

2009 edition of the MLS playoffs

Tournament details
- Country: United States
- Teams: 8

Final positions
- Champions: Real Salt Lake (1st title)
- Runners-up: Los Angeles Galaxy
- Semifinalists: Chicago Fire; Houston Dynamo

Tournament statistics
- Matches played: 11
- Goals scored: 21 (1.91 per match)
- Attendance: 259,149 (23,559 per match)
- Top goal scorer(s): (United States) Landon Donovan (United States) Robbie Findley (3 goals each)

The 2009 MLS Cup playoffs was the postseason to Major League Soccer's 2009 season. MLS Cup 2009 concluded the season on November 22, 2009, at Qwest Field in Seattle, Washington. Real Salt Lake won the Cup on penalties over the Los Angeles Galaxy.

== Format ==
At the 2009 season's end, the top two teams of each conference made the playoffs; in addition, the clubs with the next four highest point totals, regardless of conference, were added to the playoffs. In the first round of this knockout tournament, aggregate goals over two matches determined the winners; the Conference Championships were one match each, with the winner of each conference advancing to MLS Cup. In all rounds, the tie-breaking method was two 15-minute periods of extra time, followed by penalty kicks if necessary. The away goals rule was not used.

== Qualified teams ==
=== Conference standings ===
Eastern Conference

Pos	Team	Pld	W	L	T	GF	GA	GD	Pts	Qualification
1	Columbus Crew	30	13	7	10	41	31	+10	49	MLS Cup Playoffs
2	Chicago Fire	30	11	7	12	39	34	+5	45	MLS Cup Playoffs
3	New England Revolution	30	11	10	9	33	37	−4	42	MLS Cup Playoffs
4	D.C. United	30	9	8	13	43	44	−1	40	
5	Toronto FC	30	10	11	9	37	46	−9	39	
6	Kansas City Wizards	30	8	13	9	33	42	−9	33	
7	New York Red Bulls	30	5	19	6	27	47	−20	21	

Source: MLS

Western Conference

Pos	Team	Pld	W	L	T	GF	GA	GD	Pts	Qualification
1	LA Galaxy	30	12	6	12	36	31	+5	48	MLS Cup Playoffs
2	Houston Dynamo	30	13	8	9	39	29	+10	48	MLS Cup Playoffs
3	Seattle Sounders FC	30	12	7	11	38	29	+9	47	MLS Cup Playoffs
4	Chivas USA	30	13	11	6	34	31	+3	45	MLS Cup Playoffs
5	Real Salt Lake	30	11	12	7	43	35	+8	40	MLS Cup Playoffs
6	Colorado Rapids	30	10	10	10	42	38	+4	40	
7	FC Dallas	30	11	13	6	50	47	+3	39	
8	San Jose Earthquakes	30	7	14	9	36	50	−14	30	

Source: MLS

=== Overall standings ===
Pos	Team	Pld	W	L	T	GF	GA	GD	Pts	Qualification
1	Columbus Crew (S)	30	13	7	10	41	31	+10	49	CONCACAF Champions League
2	LA Galaxy	30	12	6	12	36	31	+5	48	CONCACAF Champions League
3	Houston Dynamo	30	13	8	9	39	29	+10	48	North American SuperLiga
4	Seattle Sounders FC	30	12	7	11	38	29	+9	47	CONCACAF Champions League
5	Chicago Fire	30	11	7	12	39	34	+5	45	North American SuperLiga
6	Chivas USA	30	13	11	6	34	31	+3	45	North American SuperLiga
7	New England Revolution	30	11	10	9	33	37	−4	42	North American SuperLiga
8	Real Salt Lake (C)	30	11	12	7	43	35	+8	40	CONCACAF Champions League
9	Colorado Rapids	30	10	10	10	42	38	+4	40	
10	D.C. United	30	9	8	13	43	44	−1	40	
11	FC Dallas	30	11	13	6	50	47	+3	39	
12	Toronto FC	30	10	11	9	37	46	−9	39	CONCACAF Champions League
13	Kansas City Wizards	30	8	13	9	33	42	−9	33	
14	San Jose Earthquakes	30	7	14	9	36	50	−14	30	
15	New York Red Bulls	30	5	19	6	27	47	−20	21	

Source: MLS
Rules for classification: 1) points; 2) head-to-head record; 3) goal difference; 4) number of goals scored
(C) Champions; (S) Supporters' Shield

== Bracket ==
Conference semifinals
E1	Columbus Crew	0	2
E4	Real Salt Lake	1	3
Eastern Conference
E3	New England Revolution	2	0
E2	Chicago Fire	1	2
W1	Los Angeles Galaxy	2	1
W4	Chivas USA	2	0
Western Conference
W3	Seattle Sounders FC	0	0
W2	Houston Dynamo (a.e.t.)	0	1

Conference finals
E4	Real Salt Lake (p)	0 (5)
E2	Chicago Fire	0 (4)
W1	Los Angeles Galaxy (a.e.t.)	2
W2	Houston Dynamo	0

MLS Cup
E4	Real Salt Lake (p)	1 (5)
W1	Los Angeles Galaxy	1 (4)

^{1} Real Salt Lake earned the eighth and final playoff berth, despite finishing fifth in the Western Conference. They represented the fourth seed in the Eastern Conference playoff bracket, as only three teams in the Eastern Conference qualified for the playoffs.

== Conference semifinals ==
=== Eastern Conference ===
October 31
4:30 pm MDT

Real Salt Lake	1–0	Columbus Crew
Findley 88'	Report

Rio Tinto Stadium, Sandy, Utah
Attendance: 11,499
Referee: Mark Geiger
November 5
8:00 pm EST

Columbus Crew	2–3	Real Salt Lake
Barros Schelotto 17', 35'	Report	Morales 37'; Findley 45+2' (pen.); Williams 77'

Columbus Crew Stadium, Columbus, Ohio
Attendance: 10,109
Referee: Silviu Petrescu

Real Salt Lake won 4–2 on aggregate.

November 1
2:00 pm EST

New England Revolution	2–1	Chicago Fire
Osei 45+1'; Joseph 75'	Report	Rolfe 17'

Gillette Stadium, Foxborough, Massachusetts
Attendance: 7,416
Referee: Baldomero Toledo
November 7
7:30 pm CST

Chicago Fire	2–0	New England Revolution
Thorrington 35'; Blanco 83'	Report

Toyota Park, Bridgeview, Illinois
Attendance: 21,528
Referee: Alex Prus

Chicago Fire won 3–2 on aggregate.

=== Western Conference ===
November 1
8:00 pm PST

Chivas USA	2–2	Los Angeles Galaxy
Maicon Santos 4'; Galindo 50'	Report	Magee 14'; Donovan 41'

Home Depot Center, Carson, California
Attendance: 25,218
Referee: Kevin Stott
November 8
4:30 pm PST

Los Angeles Galaxy	1–0	Chivas USA
Donovan 73' (pen.)	Report

Home Depot Center, Carson, California
Attendance: 27,000
Referee: Ricardo Salazar

Los Angeles Galaxy won 3–2 on aggregate.

October 29
7:00 pm PDT

Seattle Sounders FC	0–0	Houston Dynamo
	Report

Qwest Field, Seattle, Washington
Attendance: 35,807
Referee: Ricardo Salazar
November 8
3:00 pm CST

Houston Dynamo	1–0 (a.e.t.)	Seattle Sounders FC
Ching 96'	Report

Robertson Stadium, Houston, Texas
Attendance: 27,465
Referee: Jorge Gonzalez

Houston Dynamo won 1–0 on aggregate.

== Conference finals ==
=== Eastern Conference ===
November 14
7:00 pm CST

Chicago Fire	0–0 (a.e.t.)	Real Salt Lake
	Report
Penalties
Blanco (penalty scored); McBride (penalty scored); Conde (penalty scored); Thorrington (penalty missed); Brown (penalty scored); Pause (penalty missed); Prideaux (penalty missed)	4–5	(penalty scored) Mathis; (penalty missed) Morales; (penalty scored) Findley; (penalty scored) Beckerman; (penalty scored) Johnson; (penalty missed) Espíndola; (penalty scored) Grabavoy

Toyota Park, Bridgeview, Illinois
Attendance: 21,723
Referee: Ricardo Salazar

=== Western Conference ===
November 13
8:00 pm PST

Los Angeles Galaxy	2–0 (a.e.t.)	Houston Dynamo
Berhalter 103'; Donovan 109' (pen.)	Report

Home Depot Center, Carson, California
Attendance: 25,373
Referee: Terry Vaughn

== MLS Cup 2009 ==
November 22, 2009
5:30 pm PST

Real Salt Lake	1–1 (a.e.t.)	LA Galaxy
Findley 64'	Report	Magee 41'
Penalties
Mathis (penalty scored); Findley (penalty scored); Beckerman (penalty missed); Grabavoy (penalty scored); Williams (penalty missed); Wingert (penalty scored); Russell (penalty scored)	5–4	(penalty scored) Beckham; (penalty scored) Berhalter; (penalty missed) Kirovski; (penalty missed) Donovan; (penalty scored) Magee; (penalty scored) Klein; (penalty missed) Buddle

Qwest Field, Seattle, Washington
Attendance: 46,011
Referee: Kevin Stott

== See also ==
- 2009 Major League Soccer season
