= FSG =

FSG can refer to:

- Finite state grammar
- Falling sand game
- Fishersgate railway station, a railway station in Sussex, England
- Fluorosilicate glass
- Focal segmental glomerulosclerosis
- Free Spirit Gathering, an American Pagan and Pantheist event
- United States Federal Sentencing Guidelines

== Organizations ==
- Fellow of the Society of Genealogists
- Florida State Guard, active during World War II
- Folkestone School for Girls, in England
- Fortress Study Group, a British historical charity
- Free Standards Group, a defunct open-source standards organization

=== Businesses ===
- Facility Solutions Group, an American electrical engineering company
- Farrar, Straus and Giroux, an American book publisher
- Fenway Sports Group, an American sports investment company
- Flensburger Schiffbau-Gesellschaft, a German shipbuilder
- Frontier Services Group, a Hong Kong–based, Africa-focused security, aviation, and logistics company
