= AT&T Stadium =

Stadium in Arlington, Texas

- Jerry World; The Palace in Dallas; The Cowboys Cathedral

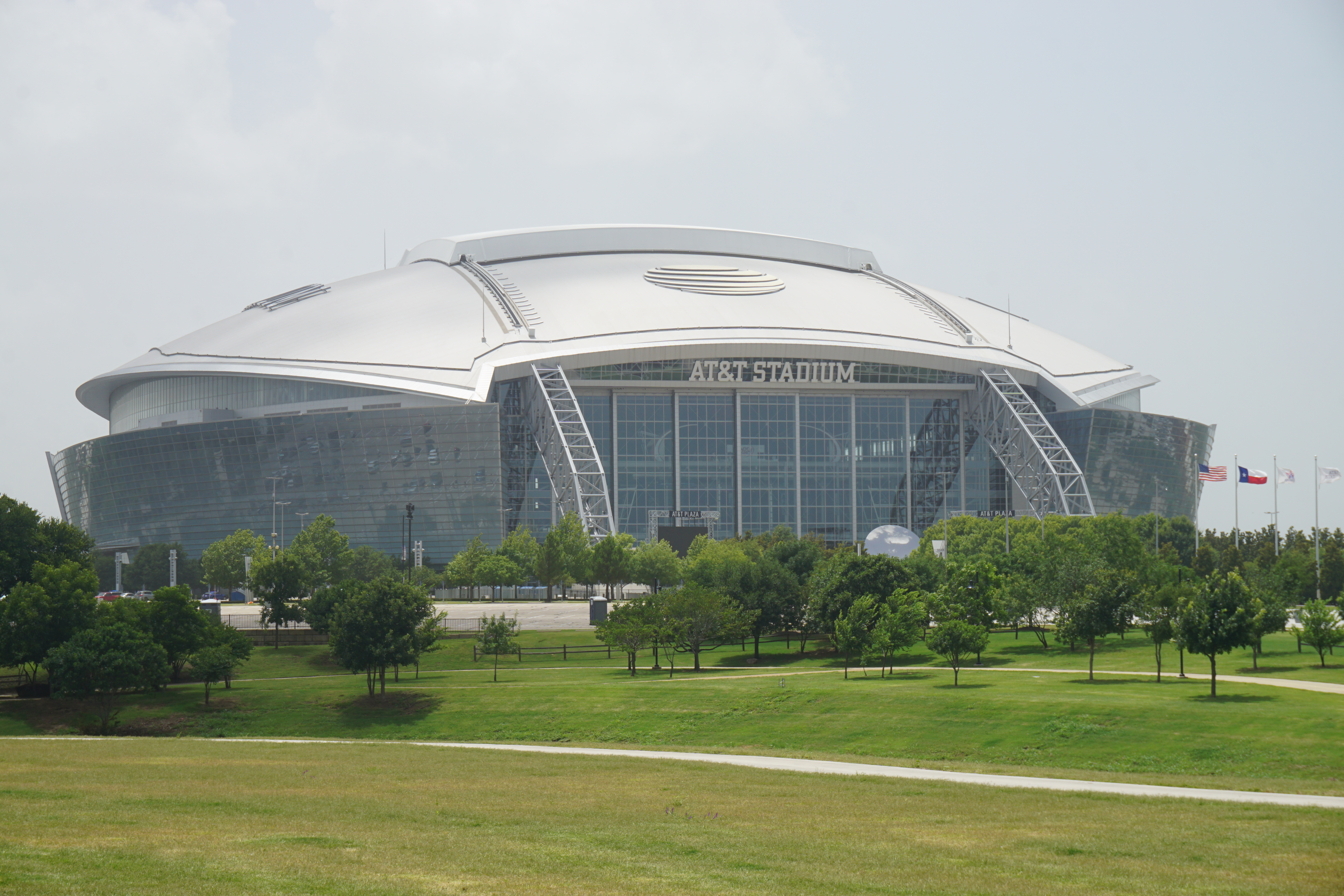
- Exterior of the stadium in June 2020

- Location in Texas Location in the United States
- Former names: Cowboys Stadium (2009–2013); Dallas Stadium (2026 FIFA World Cup)
- Address: 1 AT&T Way
- Location: Arlington, Texas, U.S.
- Coordinates: 32°44′52″N 97°5′34″W
- Owner: City of Arlington
- Operator: Dallas Cowboys
- Capacity: 80,000 (expandable to over 100,000 with standing room); 70,649 (2026 FIFA World Cup)
- Executive suites: 380
- Roof: Retractable
- Surface: Hellas Matrix Turf with Helix Soft Top artificial turf
- Record attendance: List: Football: 105,121 September 20, 2009 Dallas Cowboys vs. New York Giants; Basketball: 108,713 February 14, 2010 2010 NBA All-Star Game; Boxing: 72,300 (first fight) November 15, 2024 Paul vs. Tyson; Professional wrestling: 156,352 April 2 & 3 2022 WrestleMania 38

Construction
- Groundbreaking: September 20, 2005 (21 years ago)
- Built: 2006–2009
- Opened: May 27, 2009 (17 years ago)
- Cost: $1.3 billion ($1.95 billion in 2025 dollars)
- Architect: HKS, Inc.
- Project manager: Blue Star Development/Jack Hill
- Structural engineers: Walter P Moore Engineers and Consultants; Campbell & Associates Consulting Engineers, Inc.
- Services engineers: M-E Engineers, Inc.
- General contractor: Manhattan/Rayco/3i

Tenants
- Dallas Cowboys (NFL) 2009–present Southwest Classic (NCAA) 2009–2011, 2014–2019, 2021–2024; Big 12 Championship Game (NCAA) 2009, 2010, 2017–present Cotton Bowl Classic (NCAA) 2010–present

Website
- attstadium.com

AT&T Stadium is a retractable roof stadium in Arlington, Texas, United States. It serves as the home of the Dallas Cowboys of the National Football League (NFL) and opened in 2009. It is also the home of the Cotton Bowl Classic and the Big 12 Championship Game, and hosted the Southwest Classic until 2024. The stadium was one of 11 US venues that hosted matches during the 2026 FIFA World Cup. The facility, owned by the City of Arlington, has also been used for a variety of other activities, such as concerts, basketball games, soccer, college and high-school football contests, rodeos, motocross, Spartan Races and professional wrestling. It replaced the partially covered Texas Stadium, which served as the Cowboys' home from 1971 through the 2008 season.

The stadium is widely referred to as Jerry World after Dallas Cowboys owner Jerry Jones, who originally envisioned it as a large entertainment venue. The stadium seats 80,000 people, but can be reconfigured to hold over 100,000 people by the use of standing room, making it the largest stadium in the NFL by seating capacity. Additional attendance is made possible by the Party Pass (open areas) sections behind the seats in each end zone that are positioned on a series of six elevated platforms connected by stairways. The record attendance for an NFL regular season game was set in 2009 with a crowd of 105,121. It also has twin video boards that are among the top 100 largest high-definition video screens in the world.

== Construction and design ==
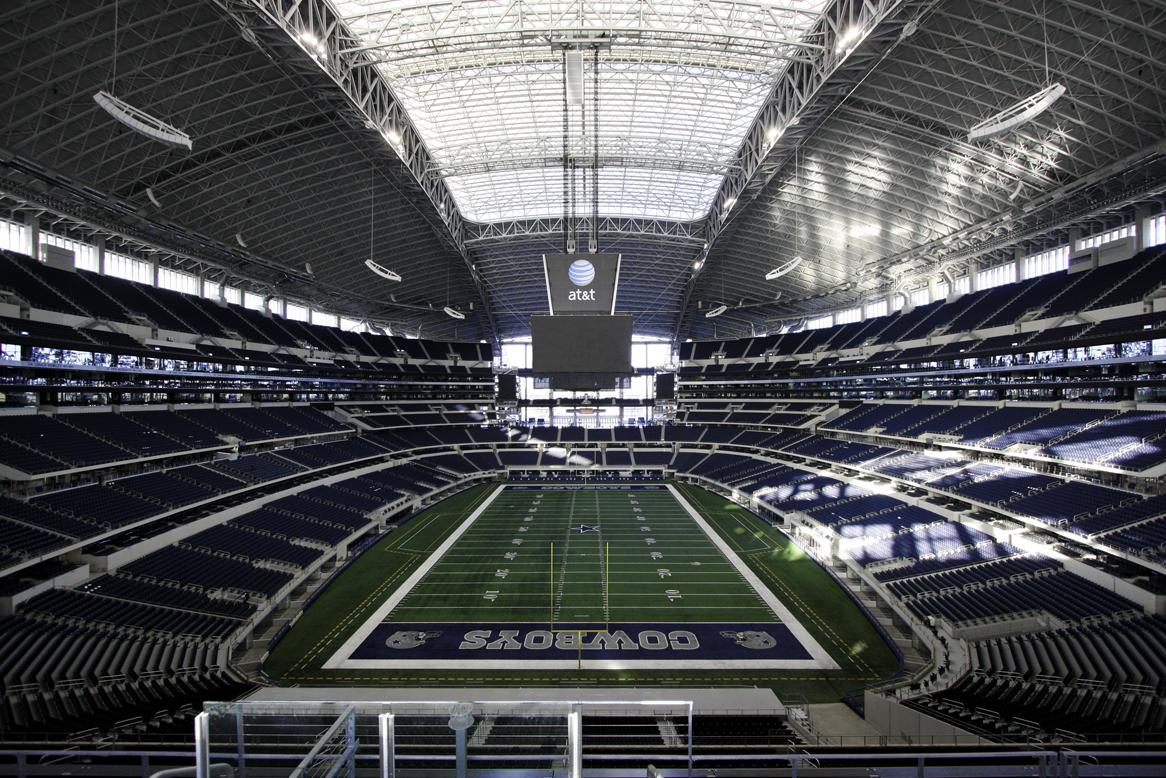
Interior of the stadium in 2010

Originally estimated at $650 million, the stadium's actual construction cost rose to $1.15 billion, making it one of the most expensive sports venues ever built. To aid Cowboys owner and general manager, Jerry Jones, in paying the construction costs of the new stadium, Arlington voters approved the increase of the city's sales tax by 0.5%, the hotel occupancy tax by 2%, and car rental tax by 5%. The City of Arlington provided over $325 million (including interest) in bonds as funding, and Jones covered any cost overruns. The NFL provided the Cowboys with an additional $150 million loan, following its policy for facilitating financing for the construction of new stadiums.

The lead architect on the design team at HKS Architects for the project was Bryan Trubey, who has stated that the overarching concept for the stadium was "...that this should not be just a stadium, but should almost be built like a civic structure."

A pair of nearly 300 ft (91 m)-tall arches spans the length of the stadium dome (one of the tallest domes in the world), anchored to the ground at each end. The new stadium also includes "more than 3,000 Sony LCD screens throughout the luxury suites, concourses, concession areas and more, offering fans viewing options that extend beyond the action on the field". It also houses a center-hung Mitsubishi video display board that was the largest HDTV screen in the world at the time of its installation. It has since been surpassed in size by the Panasonic "Big Hoss" video board (218 feet (66 m) wide and 94.6 feet (28.8 m) tall) at Texas Motor Speedway. Glass doors, allowing each end zone to be opened, were designed and constructed by Dallas-based Haley-Greer glass systems.

The retractable roof was designed by structural engineering firm Walter P Moore and the systems were implemented by mechanization consultants Uni-Systems. The electrification of Cowboys Stadium's retractable roof was developed by VAHLE, Inc. These kinetic architecture fundamentals are employed to create quick conversions of the facility to accommodate a variety of events. When the design was officially unveiled on December 12, 2006, it showed that from inside the stadium, the roof (membrane installed by K Post Company of Dallas) would look very similar to the Texas Stadium roof, with its trademark hole. However, it can be covered by the retractable roof panel to protect against the elements.

The football turf field was built by Hellas Construction, which developed a special SoftTop Convertible Turf system that has 26 interchangeable panels to allow the stadium to host a variety of events from concerts, dirt bike races, and monster truck rallies to college football, basketball, and soccer games.

== Renovations and improvements ==
AT&T Stadium has seen several renovations and improvements since it opened in 2009. In August 2023, the Dallas Cowboys announced a series of renovations and improvements for technology and interior spaces within the stadium. The planned improvements included changes to the center-hung video board, retail, concessions, luxury suites, interior areas, and other spaces inside the stadium. The total improvement project was estimated at $295 million, and about $180 million of that was for interior improvements within the stadium.

The improvements were expected to include a center-hung video board with 4K capability. The improvements also included planned renovations to seven AT&T Stadium Pro Shops. New permanent concessions and bars were also planned. Additionally, wellness areas were planned for the main clubs and upper concourse. The project also included planned changes to interior design, technology, and luxury suites. Corridors connecting the luxury suites were also scheduled for renovation. According to reports from August 2023, the renovations were planned to occur over multiple phases of the project while minimizing disruptions to events and games.

In August 2023, a project for interior renovations at AT&T Stadium was registered with the Texas Department of Licensing and Regulation as project TABS2023026459. The project, titled "AT&T Stadium Interior Refresh," had an estimated project budget of $180 million and covered approximately 575,000 square feet. The project included planned improvements to luxury suites and premium clubs, including finishes and millwork. The registered design architect for the project was HKS Inc., the architectural firm that designed the original AT&T Stadium. The project listed a proposed start date of January 2, 2024, and a proposed completion date of July 31, 2025. The project was also listed in the Texas Department of Licensing and Regulation database as having an inspection status of "Inspection Complete."

The project improvements were scheduled ahead of the 2026 FIFA World Cup. AT&T Stadium served as one of the tournament's venues. According to 2023 reporting, the improvements were planned to continue into 2025 with the goal of completion prior to the World Cup. The interior renovations and improvements were expected to include upgrades to interior, premium seating, technology, and service areas within the stadium, with a goal of little or no changes to the exterior appearance of the stadium.

In April 2026, the Arlington City Council approved an extension of the Dallas Cowboys' lease at AT&T Stadium through 2055. The previous lease on AT&T Stadium was set to expire in 2040, and this lease extension added 15 years. As part of the agreement, the Cowboys agreed to invest a minimum of $750 million in maintenance, improvements, and operations of the stadium through the new lease. The City of Arlington also agreed to provide a maximum of $273 million over a 20-year period through a maintenance and operations fund. Funds for the City of Arlington would be drawn from existing voter-approved venue taxes and would not be drawn from the city's general fund or from new taxes.

The agreement also included planned improvements to the stadium and other public elements within the stadium complex. Improvements included plans for changes to event operations, security, traffic flow, pedestrian access, and safety. The Dallas Cowboys would continue to operate and maintain the stadium as well as be responsible for the design and construction of improvements. The Cowboys would fund eligible improvements and receive reimbursement from the city over time. The improvements were scheduled to be completed by 2043, and the Cowboys' lease would remain in effect through 2055 under this agreement.

== Timeline ==
Video of inside the stadium

- 1994: Cowboys owner Jerry Jones proposed to expand the 65,000-seat Texas Stadium by up to 40,000 seats, add retractable roof panels and install a climate-control system to make the stadium a year-round venue for sporting events, including the Super Bowl, concerts, and conventions.
- 1997–2000: The Cowboys held preliminary talks with Arlington officials about building a stadium there. The team also publicly discussed a $260 million plan to upgrade Texas Stadium. In 2000, the Cowboys compiled a list of potential stadium sites, which included Grapevine, Coppell, and Arlington. The team continued negotiating with Irving to renovate Texas Stadium.
- 2001: Jones said Arlington is a leading contender for a $500 million stadium. The primary site considered is the 2,000 acres (810 ha) Lakes of Arlington tract on Farm to Market Road 157. Other cities in the running included Grapevine and Grand Prairie. In October, Jones discussed the new stadium with the mayors of Arlington, Irving, Grapevine, and Dallas.
- 2003: The Cowboys asked the Irving City Council to extend their lease at Texas Stadium, which was to expire at the end of the 2008 season, on a year-to-year basis. They narrowed their search to sites in Las Colinas and Dallas, and state legislators filed bills that would allow Dallas County to increase its hotel-occupancy and car-rental taxes to pay for a new stadium.
- 2004: In April, the Cowboys announced plans to build a $650 million stadium at Fair Park in Dallas. The deal required $425 million in public financing from a 3% hotel-occupancy tax and a 6% car-rental tax. The deal fell apart in June when Dallas County commissioners said they cannot justify asking voters to approve the team's request for $425 million in public funding. In July, the Cowboys and Arlington announced they are negotiating to locate the stadium near Globe Life Park (then Ameriquest Field). In August, the Arlington City Council agreed unanimously to put before voters a tax increase that would fund the city's $325 million portion of the project. Voters approved the tax increase on November 2.
- 2005: Arlington and the Cowboys chose the site south of Randol Mill Road and east of Collins Street for the new stadium. The city began notifying residents and property owners of its plans to acquire their property. The Cowboys hired the HKS architectural firm to design the stadium. Early blueprints showed 414 luxury suites and a two-panel retractable roof. The city completed its sale of $297.9 million in bonds to pay for its portion of the construction. Demolition of houses began November 1. This included homes that the city had seized from residents who wanted to keep their house and refused to sell. One such resident characterized the negotiation for his home as "...giving me pennies and telling me to get out"
- January 2006: The Cowboys hired Oklahoma-based Manhattan Construction as the general contractor for the stadium and the city completed its land purchases, although it still faced a number of lawsuits over land acquisition. Later that month, Tarrant County work crews began demolition of more than 150 Arlington residences and small-business structures to make room for the stadium.
- March 2006: An alliance was announced between Manhattan Construction and two general contractors, Rayco Construction of Grand Prairie and 3i Construction of Dallas, to manage the stadium's construction.
- April 2006: Excavation began by Mario Sinacola and Sons Excavating. By August, they had moved over 1.4 million cubic yards (1,100,000 m^{3}) of earth, shaping a 13-to-14-acre (5.3 to 5.7 ha) stadium bowl an average of 54 feet (16 m) deep.
- August 2006: Two construction cranes were raised on the site.
- October 2006: The grass amphitheater on Randol Mill Road was leveled to make way for the extension of Baird Farm Road.
- December 2006: The stadium's structure began to go up, and on December 12, Jerry Jones unveiled the in-depth plans and designs of the stadium to the public.
- January 2007: A construction worker was injured in a 20 ft (6 m) fall.
- February 2007: Masonry work began.
- March 2007: Heldenfels Enterprises was awarded the contract to manufacture and erect the precast/prestressed concrete structural components and placement of them began in April.
- June 2007: Work on the retractable roof, designed by Uni-Systems, started.
- July 2007: Exterior facade and enclosure work began.
- October 2007: The first steel arch was completed.

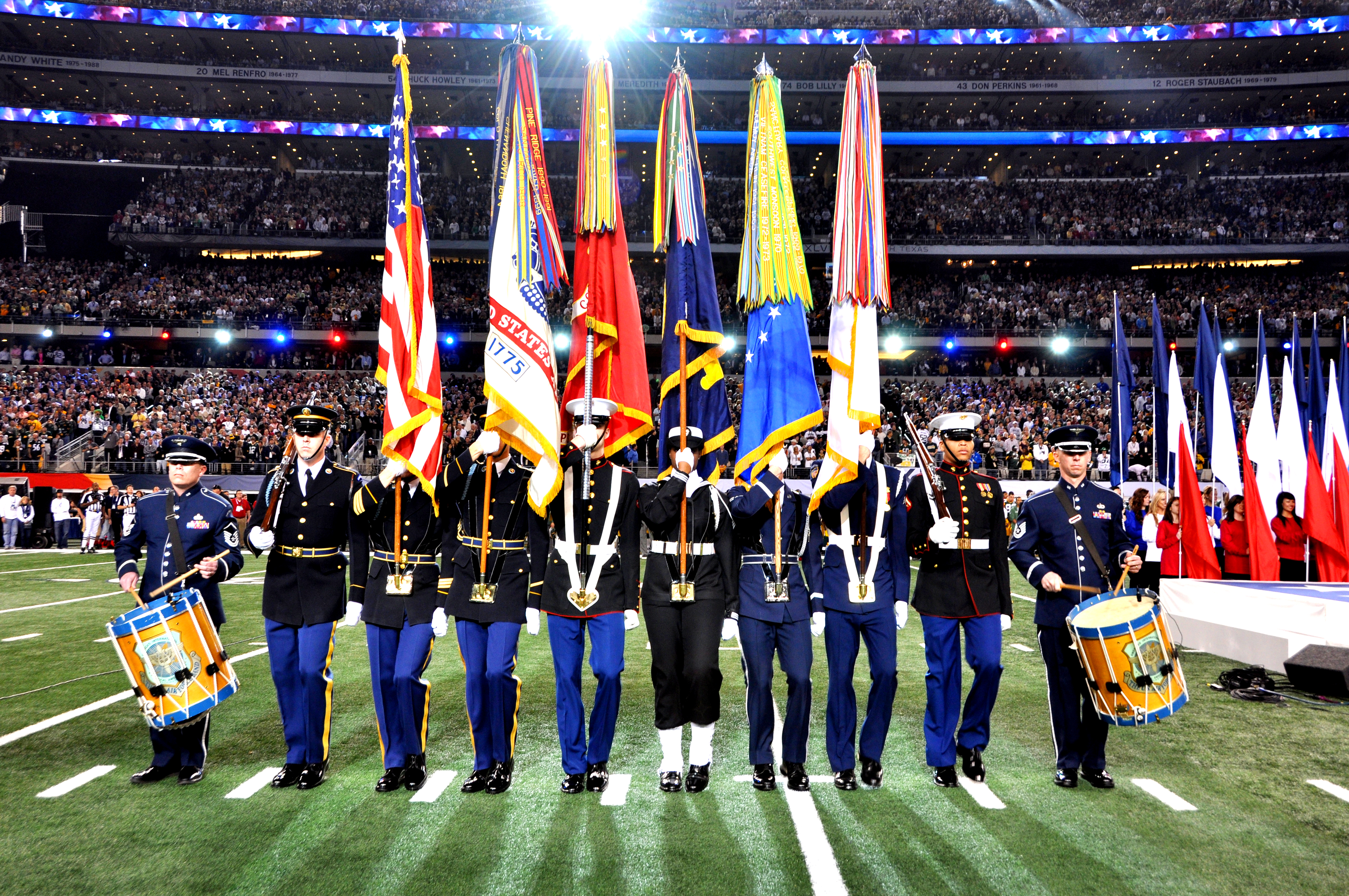
Armed Forces Color Guard at Super Bowl XLV; then Cowboys Stadium

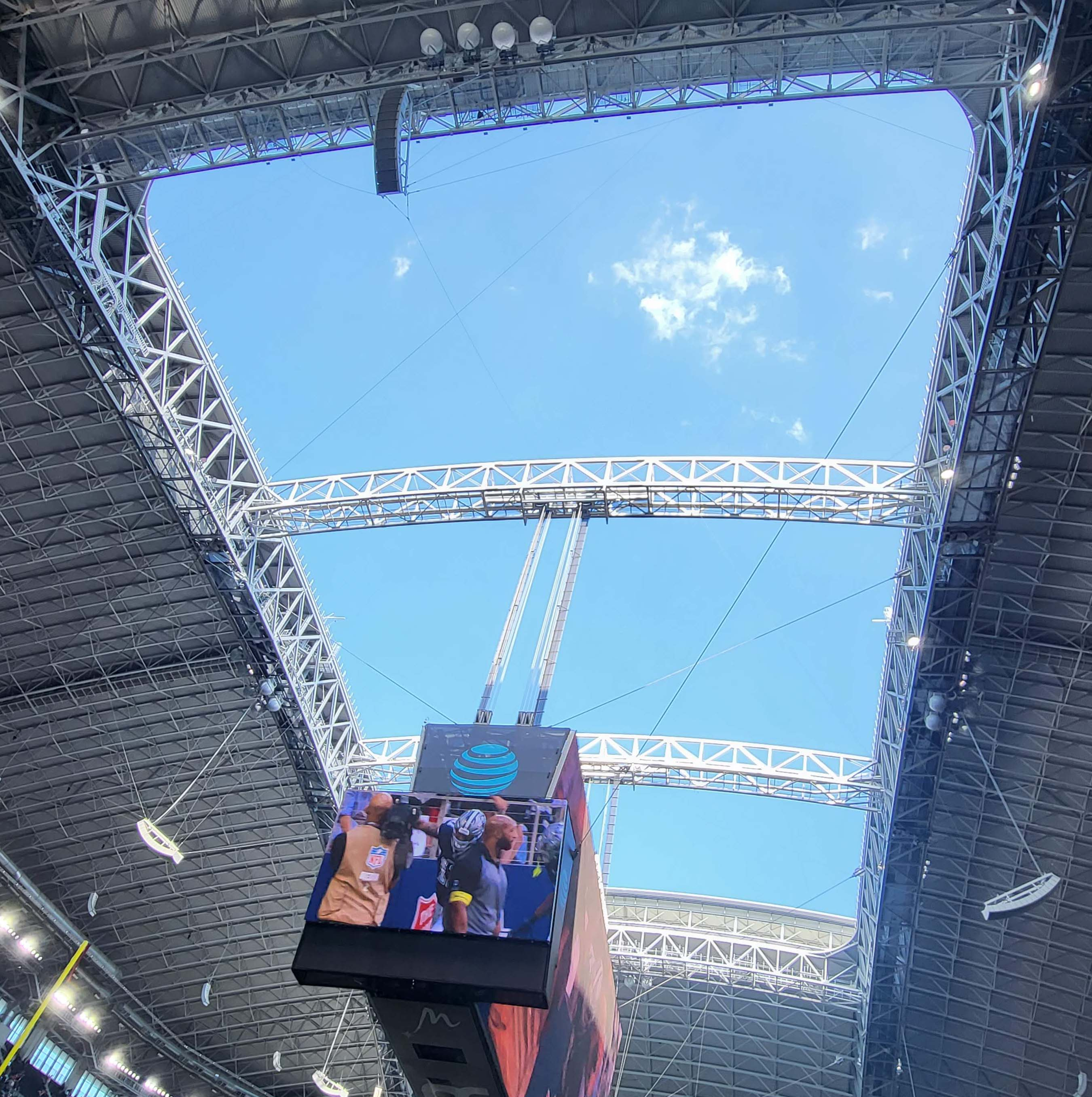
The roof open at the stadium during a game between the Dallas Cowboys and Chicago Bears in 2022.

- February 2008: The second steel arch was completed.
- June 2008: Jones commissioned the world's largest 1080p HDTV, to hang above field.
- June 2008: An electrician was electrocuted while working on the stadium. Two days before, three people were injured while assembling a crane.
- 2009: The stadium was scheduled for "substantial completion" in June. The artificial-turf field was brought into the stadium in July. The Cowboys played their first preseason home game on August 21 and their first regular-season home game on Sunday, September 20.
- May 13, 2009: Jerry Jones announced the official name of the new venue as Cowboys Stadium.
- June 6, 2009: The first event was held at the stadium, with country concert showcasing Lee Ann Womack, Blake Shelton, Reba McEntire, and George Strait.
- February 6, 2011: The 2010 NFL season Super Bowl was hosted at the Cowboys Stadium, which had the Green Bay Packers defeat the Pittsburgh Steelers in Super Bowl XLV.
- July 25, 2013: Jerry Jones announced that the official name of the venue was changed to AT&T Stadium as part of a naming rights deal.
- April 5–7, 2014: The stadium was home for the Final Four of the 2014 NCAA Division I men's basketball tournament.
- January 12, 2015: The stadium served as host of the first championship game in the College Football Playoff era. Ohio State defeated Oregon, 42–20.
- April 19, 2015: The stadium served as host of the 50th Annual Academy of Country Music Awards hosted by Blake Shelton and Luke Bryan.
- April 3, 2016: The stadium served as the host of WWE's WrestleMania 32.
- September 26, 2016: The Stadium Club opened, which was the first public five-days-a-week restaurant and bar located within the AT&T Stadium.
- April 2–3, 2022: The stadium served as the host of WWE's WrestleMania 38.
- June 22, 2026: The stadium hosted nine matches in the 2026 FIFA World Cup under the name Dallas Stadium.

=== Opening ===
- May 27, 2009: The stadium was completed and opened to the public. Ribbon cutting ceremony includes Cowboys players (including Rayfield Wright, Troy Aikman, Emmitt Smith, Michael Irvin, Daryl Johnston, Preston Pearson, and Chad Hennings), North Texas mayors and various media personalities.
- June 6, 2009: Country music star George Strait, along with Reba McEntire, headlined the first event in the new stadium. Opening acts included Blake Shelton and Lee Ann Womack.
- July 19, 2009: The first sporting event is held in Cowboys Stadium. Costa Rica won in the Gold Cup Quarterfinal game versus Guadeloupe, with the first goal scored in stadium history during the 2nd minute by Celso Borges. That match was immediately followed by a sold out match between Mexico and Haiti, with 82,252 in attendance.
- July 26, 2009: The final match of the 2009 World Football Challenge is held between Chelsea F.C. and Club America. The London club won the match 2–0 in front of 57,229. The event was the second sporting event held in the new stadium, but was notable as the first event held during a severe thunderstorm.
- August 20, 2009: Jody Dean, a member of the Texas Radio Hall of Fame and KLUV-FM (98.7) talk show host, will be Cowboys Stadium's public address announcer. Dean replaces his longtime nemesis KTCK 1310 AM "The Ticket"'s George Dunham, the Hot Fry enthusiast and former voice of Texas Stadium.
- August 21, 2009: The Cowboys played the Tennessee Titans in their first preseason home game and first American football game ever played at Cowboys Stadium. The game was nationally televised on FOX at 7 pm CDT. Dallas won the game 30–10, with one play from scrimmage blown dead when a ball punted by Titans' rookie punter A. J. Trapasso struck the main video screen after repeatedly striking it during pregame warmups.
- September 5, 2009: Brigham Young defeated Oklahoma 14–13 in the first "regular-season" game played in the new stadium.
- September 20, 2009: The Cowboys played their first NFL regular-season game in the new stadium, with former President and Texas resident George W. Bush handling the opening coin toss. The Cowboys lost to their long-time NFC East division rivals, the New York Giants, 33–31 with Eli Manning leading them on a last-second field goal by Lawrence Tynes. It was televised on NBC. This game attracted a record-breaking crowd of 105,121. After the game, Manning signed the wall of the visitor's locker room with the message, "First win in the New Stadium."
- September 28, 2009: The Cowboys got their first home regular season win in AT&T Stadium, beating the Carolina Panthers 21–7 with 90,588 in attendance. The game was televised on ESPN's Monday Night Football and marked a record 42nd win for the Cowboys on that show.

== Naming ==
Although the stadium had yet to sell naming rights, many fans started referring to the project with various nicknames such as "Jerry World", "The Palace in Dallas" (for which announcer Bob Costas was criticized by the Arlington mayor), "Cowboys Cathedral", "Jerrassic Park" and others. There was also a petition by some fans to have the stadium named after longtime Cowboys' coach Tom Landry.

On May 13, 2009, Jerry Jones announced the official name as Cowboys Stadium.

On July 25, 2013, Jerry Jones announced that the Dallas Cowboys had agreed to grant naming rights to AT&T. The name change from Cowboys Stadium to AT&T Stadium took effect immediately. The sponsorship deal was reported to be worth about $17–19 million per year. Facility Solutions Group installed the "AT&T Stadium" letters on the top of the stadium. Signage includes two sets of letters 43 feet (13 m) tall stretching 385 feet (117 m). The letters are made of lightweight components and aluminum and are insulated and heated to melt ice and snow.

== Video boards ==
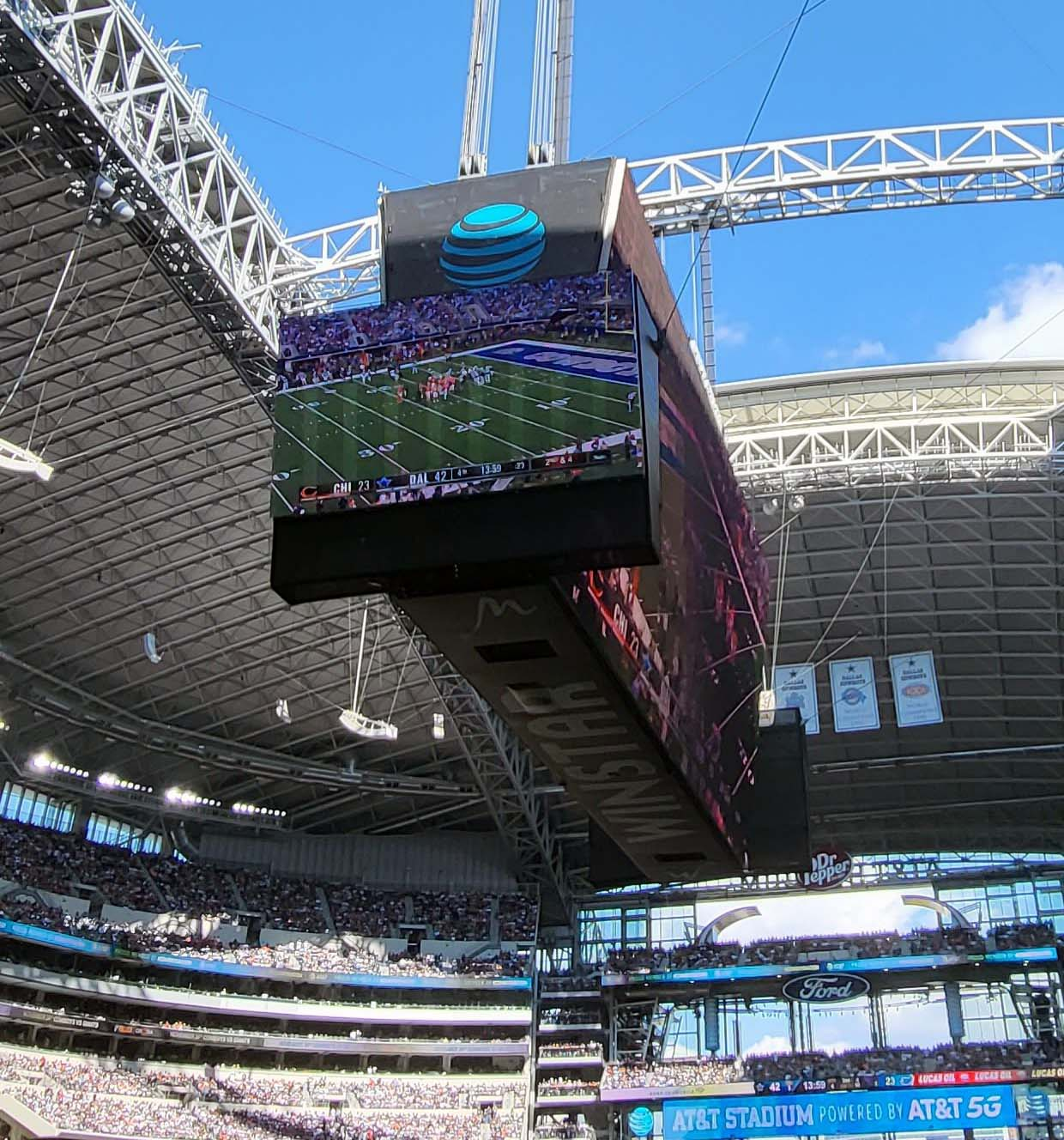
The video boards at the stadium in 2022.

The AT&T Stadium is renowned for its massive high-definition video displays, which enhance the spectator experience for fans throughout the venue. At the center of the stadium hangs a pair of twin video boards, each measuring 160 feet (49 m) wide by 72 feet (22 m) tall, making them among the largest in the world at the time of their installation in 2009. These screens, manufactured by Mitsubishi, span nearly the length of the field from one 20-yard line to the other and provide crystal-clear, nearly life-sized views of the action on the pitch. Additional end-zone displays, each 51 feet (15.5 m) wide by 29 feet (8.8 m) tall, complement the main boards, while over 3,000 smaller Sony LCD screens are distributed throughout the suites, concourses, and concession areas. Although surpassed by newer installations elsewhere, these video boards remain iconic features of "Jerry World" and continue to rank among the largest high-definition screens in sports venues globally.

Guinness World Records was on hand at the September 28, 2009, game against the Carolina Panthers to award certificates to the chairman of Mitsubishi Electric and Cowboys owner Jerry Jones for the world's largest HD video display. For basketball events played at the stadium, such as the 2010 NBA All-Star Game, the 175 feet (58 yd) twin video screens that comprise the length of the scoreboard are actually larger than the court. The video boards have since been surpassed in size, including at several other NFL stadiums, but remain among the largest in the world.

== Major events ==
=== NBA All-Star Weekend ===
On February 14, 2010, the stadium hosted the 2010 NBA All-Star Game. With an announced crowd of 108,713, the game became the highest-attended basketball game in history, setting a new Guinness World Record. The East squad prevailed with a 141–139 victory over the West.

=== NFL ===
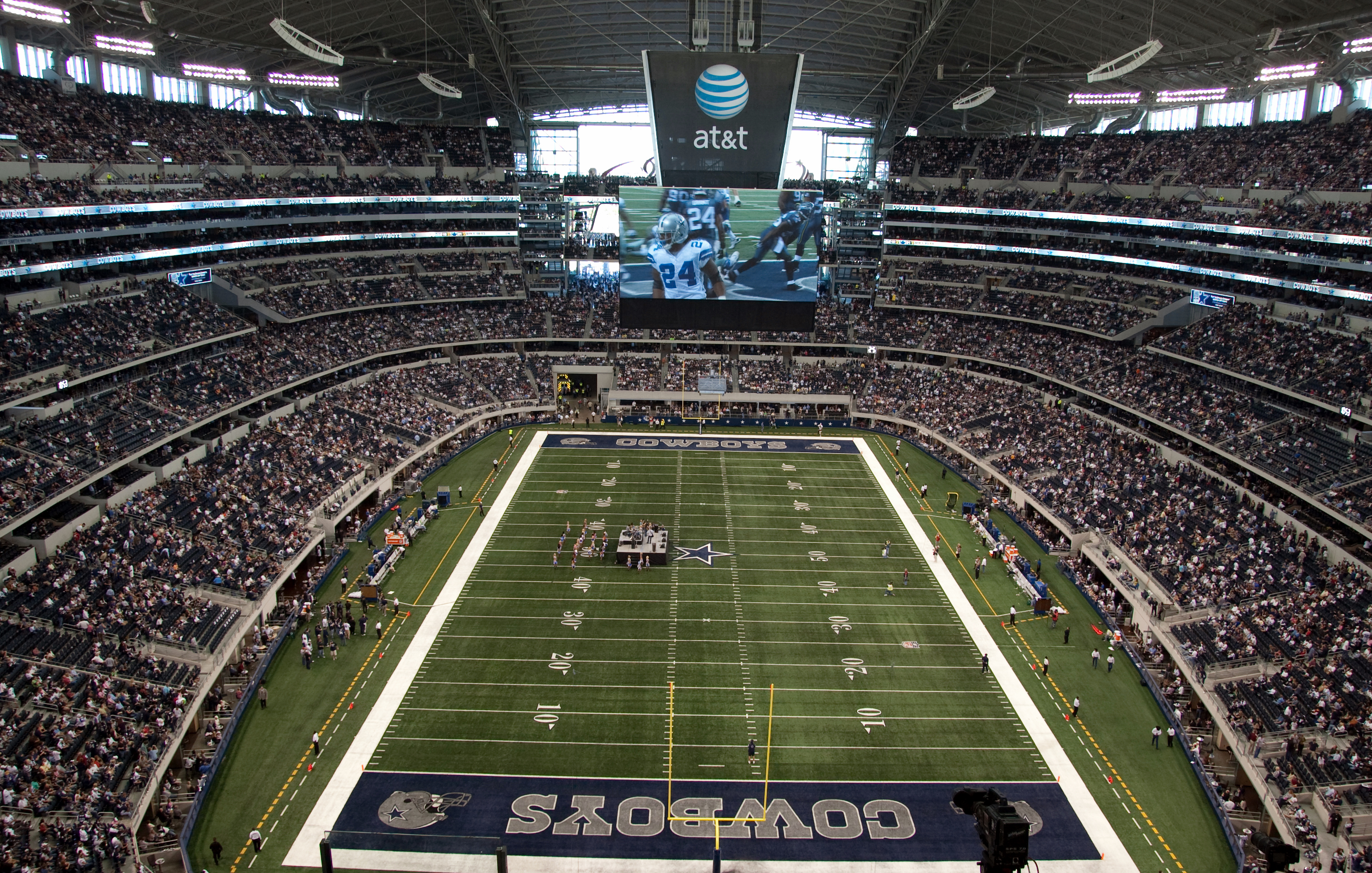
Cowboys playing at the stadium

- On January 3, 2010, the Cowboys defeated the Philadelphia Eagles in a 24–0 shutout to win the NFC East division title and complete the first ever back-to-back shutouts in franchise history.
- On January 9, 2010, the Cowboys hosted the stadium's first playoff game, again playing the Eagles. Dallas won 34–14 in the 2009 NFC Wild Card Game, ending a 13-year playoff win drought.
- On February 6, 2011, the stadium hosted Super Bowl XLV, in which the Green Bay Packers defeated the Pittsburgh Steelers, 31–25. Others bidding for the game's location were the University of Phoenix Stadium in Glendale, Arizona and Lucas Oil Stadium in Indianapolis, Indiana. The Cowboys attempted to increase the stadium's capacity to 105,000 seats in hopes of setting the record for attendance at a Super Bowl. During a last-minute attempt to add seats, seven construction workers were injured by ice sliding off of the stadium roof during an ice storm. Hours before kickoff, over 1,200 seats were blocked off in the interest of safety; according to a police officer in the affected area, the seats had not been finished in time for the fire marshal to inspect them. Approximately 800 people were given other seats inside the stadium, however, about 400 people were unable to be seated. Individuals in the latter group were given free tickets to the next year's Super Bowl and a letter from the NFL that could be exchanged for three times the face value of the Super Bowl XLV ticket. They were also given the option to either watch Super Bowl XLV on a TV in one of the stadium's lounges, where they would be unable to see the field in person, or watch on screens outside the stadium. Over 1,000 displaced fans later joined a lawsuit against the NFL, the Cowboys, and Jerry Jones. Super Bowl XLV's attendance of 103,219 fell 766 short of the record set in Super Bowl XIV.
- In 2018, the stadium hosted the 2018 NFL draft.

=== College football ===
==== College Football Playoff National Championship ====
- January 12, 2015: The (4) Ohio State Buckeyes defeated the (2) Oregon Ducks 42–20, before a crowd of 85,689 in the inaugural 2015 College Football Playoff National Championship.

==== Big 12 Championship Game ====
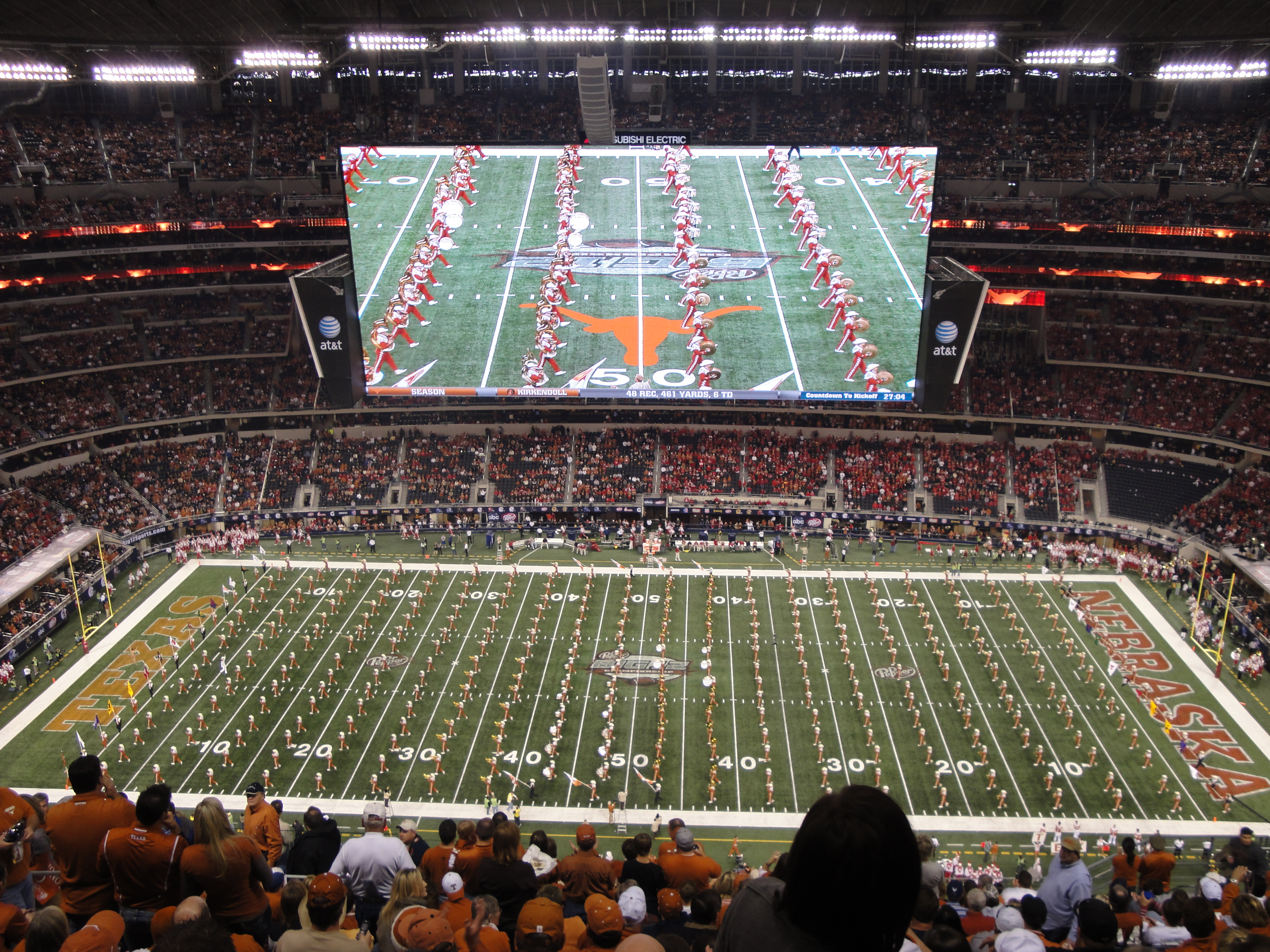
University of Texas marching band during the Big 12 Championship game

AT&T Stadium was the site of the 2009 and 2010 Big 12 Championship Games, the last two held prior to the 2010–13 Big 12 Conference realignment. On December 5, 2009, the Texas Longhorns defeated the Nebraska Cornhuskers 13–12 in the 2009 Big 12 Championship Game, the first to be held in the stadium with attendance announced at 76,211. The following year, on December 4, 2010, the Oklahoma Sooners and Nebraska Cornhuskers rekindled their rivalry as the Sooners won 23–20 in the final Big 12 Championship game until the 2017 season. The stadium was scheduled to host the games through the 2013 season, but the realignment of the Big 12 Conference to 10 teams meant they were not allowed to host a championship game because of NCAA rules requiring conferences to have at least 12 teams divided into two divisions in order to stage a championship game. However, the NCAA would later change its rules and allow a conference championship game regardless of the number of members of said conference.

==== Cotton Bowl Classic ====
- January 2, 2010: In the first bowl game played at the stadium, the Ole Miss Rebels defeated the Oklahoma State Cowboys, 21–7 in the 74th installment of the AT&T Cotton Bowl Classic. Attendance was 77,928 and was the third largest attendance of any preceding Cotton Bowl game. With Oklahoma State having played in the Cotton Bowl, all Big 12 South Teams have played at least one game in the Cowboys Stadium.
- January 7, 2011: In the 75th installment of the AT&T Cotton Bowl Classic, the LSU Tigers by a score of 41–24 defeated the Texas A&M Aggies with an outstanding attendance of 83,514 making it the second largest attendance in Cotton Bowl history. LSU finished with an 11–2 record and Texas A&M finished 9–4 making it their 49th meeting all time.
- January 6, 2012: The Arkansas Razorbacks defeated Kansas State Wildcats, 29–16. Attendance was 80,956, currently the third-highest attendance in Cotton Bowl history. During the game, Arkansas receiver Joe Adams returned a punt 51 yards for a touchdown, which was the first punt return for a touchdown in the Cotton Bowl since former Arkansas Razorback Lance Alworth returned a punt 49 yards for a touchdown in a 7–6 loss to Duke in 1961. The win also propelled the Razorbacks to a #5 ranking in the final AP poll and gave them their first 11-win season since joining the Southeastern Conference in 1991. Kansas State ended the season with a 10–3 record and ranked #15 in the final AP poll.
- January 4, 2013: The (10) Texas A&M Aggies defeated the (12) Oklahoma Sooners 41–13 to finish the season with an 11–2 record. Johnny Manziel rushed for 229 yards (on just 17 carries) during the game, a Cotton Bowl record and national bowl record for a quarterback, rushing for two touchdowns and throwing for two more. Manziel totaled 516 total yards also a Cotton Bowl Classic record. Though the halftime score was 14–13 Texas A&M, the Aggies went on to score 27 unanswered second half points to win the game. The game's attendance of 87,025 is the second highest in Cotton Bowl Classic history, behind the 2009 game between Mississippi-Texas Tech at 88,175.
- January 3, 2014: The (9) Missouri Tigers defeated the (13) Oklahoma State Cowboys 41–31 in front of an attendance of 72,690.
- January 1, 2015: The (7) Michigan State Spartans rallied from a 20-point deficit to defeat the (4) Baylor Bears 42–41 in front of an attendance of 71,464. This was the first Cotton Bowl Classic game to be featured as one of the "New Year's Six" bowls of the College Football Playoff.
- January 2, 2017: The (8) Wisconsin Badgers defeated the (15) Western Michigan Broncos in front of 59,615.
- December 29, 2017: The (5) Ohio State Buckeyes defeated the (8) USC Trojans by a score of 24–7 in front of 67,510.
- December 29, 2018: The (2) Clemson Tigers defeated the (3) Notre Dame Fighting Irish 30–3 in front of 72,183.
- December 28, 2019: The (13) Penn State Nittany Lions defeated the (15) Memphis Tigers 53–39 in front of 72,183.
- December 30, 2020: The (8) Oklahoma Sooners defeated the (10) Florida Gators 55–20 in front of 17,323.
- December 31, 2021: The (1) Alabama Crimson Tide defeated the (4) Cincinnati Bearcats 27–6 in front of 76,313 in a College Football Playoff semifinal.
- January 2, 2023: The (14) Tulane Green Wave defeated the (8) USC Trojans 46–45 in front of 55,329.
- December 29, 2023: The (9) Missouri Tigers defeated the (7) Ohio State Buckeyes 14–3 in front of 70,114.
- January 10, 2025: The (8) Ohio State Buckeyes defeated the (5) Texas Longhorns 28-14 in the College Football Playoff semifinal.

==== Rose Bowl ====
- January 1, 2021: The (1) Alabama Crimson Tide defeated the (4) Notre Dame Fighting Irish 31–14 in front of 18,373. This game was the first since 1942 that the Rose Bowl was not played in Pasadena, California, prompted by restrictions due to the COVID-19 pandemic.

==== Advocare Classic ====
- September 5, 2009: The (20) Brigham Young University Cougars and (3) Oklahoma Sooners played the first college football game in the new stadium, with the Cougars upsetting the Sooners, 14–13, in front of 75,437 spectators. So BYU holds the distinction of being the first college team to win a game in the stadium, and the team to win the first (non-preseason) game in the stadium.
- September 4, 2010: (6) TCU defeated (24) Oregon State 30–21, before a crowd of 46,138, in a season-opening encounter between ranked teams.
- September 3, 2011: (4) LSU defeated (3) Oregon 40–27, before a crowd of 87,711 in the third installment of the Cowboys Classic.
- September 1, 2012: Defending 2011 champion (2) Alabama defeated (8) Michigan 41–14, before a crowd of 90,413 in the fourth installment of the Cowboys Classic.
- August 31, 2013: (12) LSU defeated (20) TCU 37–27, before a crowd of 80,230 in the fifth installment of the Cowboys Classic.
- August 30, 2014: Defending 2013 champion (1) Florida State defeated unranked Oklahoma State 37–31, before a crowd of 61,521 in the sixth installment of the Cowboys Classic.
- August 31, 2019: (16) Auburn defeated the Oregon Ducks 27–21, after rallying from a 15-point deficit in the 3rd quarter, and scoring the winning touchdown with 9 seconds left.

==== Southwest Classic ====
The Arkansas Razorbacks vs. Texas A&M Aggies football rivalry, which began in 1903, was renewed in 2009 as the Southwest Classic, and was played at Cowboys Stadium from 2009 through 2011. In 2012, Texas A&M joined Arkansas in the Southeastern Conference, and the series reverted to the schools' home fields, Kyle Field in College Station, Texas for the 2012 game and Donald W. Reynolds Razorback Stadium in Fayetteville, Arkansas in 2013. The Southwest Classic returned to AT&T Stadium in 2014 and will remain there through at least 2024.

The 2020 game was moved from Arlington to College Station due to the COVID-19 pandemic.

- October 3, 2009: Cowboys owner Jerry Jones watched his alma mater, the Arkansas Razorbacks, defeat the Texas A&M Aggies 47–19 in the first of ten games called the Southwest Classic to be played at the stadium.
- October 9, 2010: The Arkansas Razorbacks jumped out to an early 21–7 lead, and held on to defeat the Texas A&M Aggies, 24–17.
- October 1, 2011: The Arkansas Razorbacks rallied from an 18-point halftime deficit to defeat the Texas A&M Aggies 41–38.
- September 27, 2014: The Texas A&M Aggies rallied from a deficit to force overtime and then scored the only TD for the 35–28 win to defeat the Arkansas Razorbacks.
- September 26, 2015: Texas A&M rallied from a fourth quarter deficit for the second straight year versus Arkansas, beating the Razorbacks 28–21 in OT.
- September 24, 2016: After being tied at halftime, the Aggies dominated the second half to defeat the Razorbacks 45–24.
- September 25, 2021: Arkansas snaps 9-game losing streak against the Aggies, defeating Texas A&M 20–10 and going 4-0 for the first time since 2003.

==== Texas Farm Bureau Insurance Shootout ====
In 2009, the Big 12 Conference game between the Baylor Bears and Texas Tech Red Raiders was held at Cowboys Stadium, the first time in the series the match-up was held on a neutral site. The game was the highest attended in the series' history, with 71,964 in attendance.

After the 2010 game was held at the Cotton Bowl in Fair Park, Dallas during the State Fair of Texas, the series returned to AT&T Stadium for the 2011 and 2012 games. The series' neutral site contract at AT&T Stadium could continue until 2014.

==== East–West Shrine Bowl ====
The 100th edition of the East–West Shrine Bowl, a postseason all-star game, was held at AT&T Stadium on January 30, 2025.

=== Basketball ===
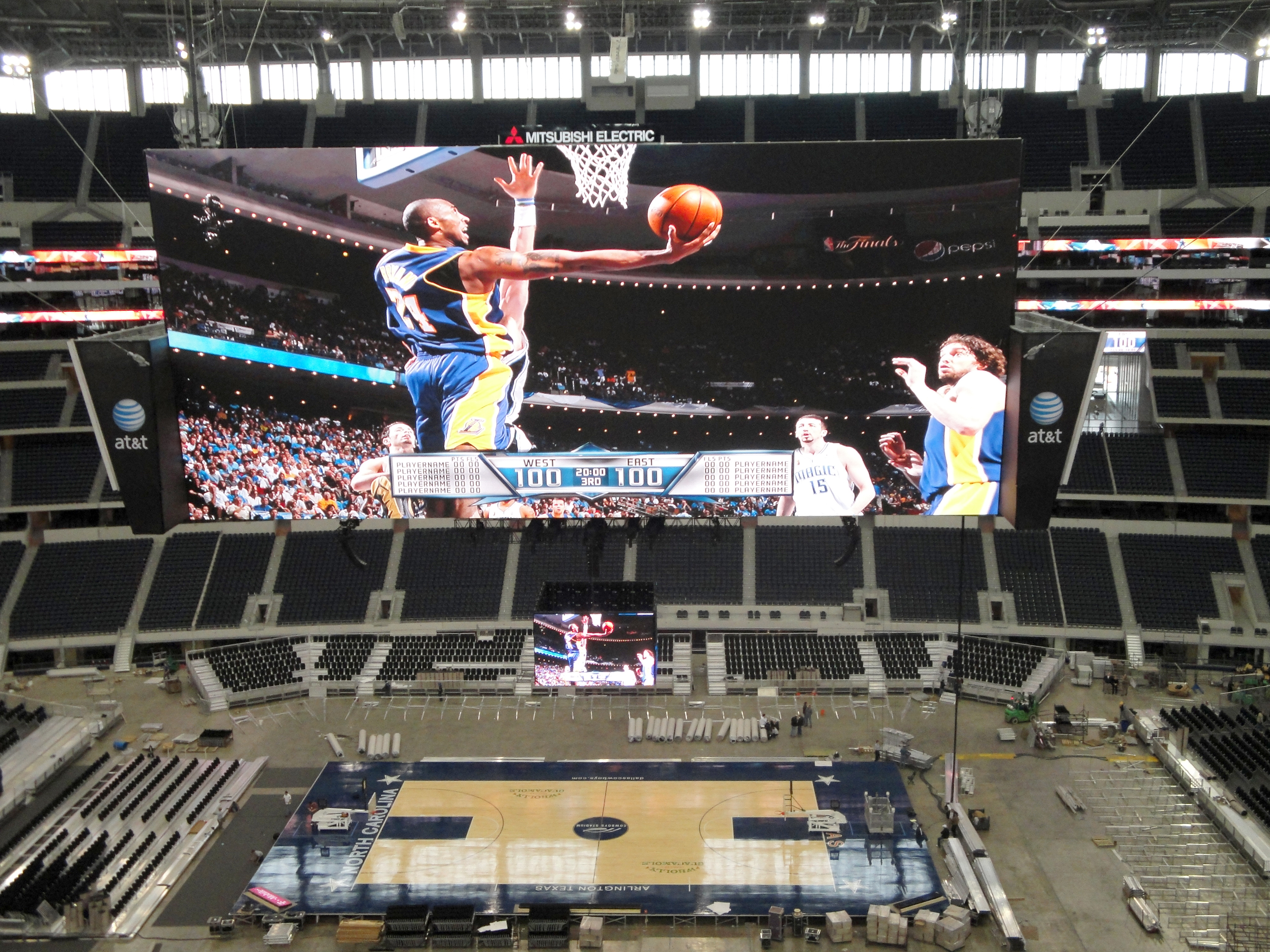
The stadium being set up for Texas vs. North Carolina game

- December 19, 2009: In the first college basketball game at the stadium, before a crowd of 38,052, the Texas Longhorns defeated the defending national champion North Carolina Tar Heels, 103–90.
- March 2013: 2013 NCAA Tournament South Regional featuring 3 games with the winner of the third going to the NCAA men's Final Four.
- 2014: 2014 NCAA men's Final Four

=== Soccer ===
- July 19, 2009 – 2009 CONCACAF Gold Cup quarterfinals. Costa Rica defeats Guadeloupe 5–1; Mexico shut out Haiti, 4–0 in front of 85,000 fans.
- July 26, 2009 – 2009 World Football Challenge. Chelsea defeats Club America 2–0 in the final match of the tournament.
- July 17, 2010 – San Luis F.C. defeats Club America 3–0 in a friendly match.
- June 5, 2011 – 2011 CONCACAF Gold Cup group stage. In the opening matches of the tournament, Costa Rica defeats Cuba 5–0 in the opener; Mexico defeats El Salvador 5–0 in the nightcap in front of 80,108 fans.
- August 6, 2011 – 2011 World Football Challenge. Club America vs FC Barcelona; score 2–0 in front of 60,087 fans.
- June 3, 2012 – In a friendly match, Mexico defeats Brazil 2–0 with goals from Giovani dos Santos and Javier Hernández.
- July 24, 2013 – 2013 CONCACAF Gold Cup semifinals. United States defeats Honduras 3–1; Panama defeats Mexico 2–1. It was the last event at the venue using the name Cowboys Stadium, and was the first appearance of the U.S. soccer team at the stadium.
- July 22, 2017 – 2017 CONCACAF Gold Cup semi-final. United States defeats Costa Rica 2–0.
- July 31, 2018 – 2018 International Champions Cup. AS Roma defeats FC Barcelona 4–2
- July 10, 2021 – 2021 CONCACAF Gold Cup group stage. Mexico draws with Trinidad and Tobago 0–0.
- July 25, 2021 – 2021 CONCACAF Gold Cup quarter-final. United States defeats Jamaica 1–0.
- July 8, 2023 – 2023 CONCACAF Gold Cup quarter-finals. Mexico defeats Costa Rica 2–0, Panama defeats Qatar 4–0.
- July 29, 2023 – In a friendly match, Barcelona defeats Real Madrid 3–0 in front of 82,026 fans.
- March 21–24, 2024 – 2024 CONCACAF Nations League Finals. United States defeats Mexico 2–0.
- June 21, 2024 – 2024 Copa América group stage. Peru ties Chile 0–0.
- June 23, 2024 – 2024 Copa América group stage. United States defeats Bolivia 2–0.
- July 5, 2024 – 2024 Copa América quarter-final. Canada defeats Venezuela 4–3 on penalties after tying 1–1.
- June 18, 2025 – 2025 CONCACAF Gold Cup group stage. Costa Rica defeats the Dominican Republic 2–1, Mexico defeats Suriname 2–0.
- June 22, 2025 – 2025 CONCACAF Gold Cup group stage. United States defeats Haiti 2–1, Dominican Republic draws with Suriname 0–0.
- June 14, 2026 – 2026 FIFA World Cup group stage. AT&T Stadium hosts the first World Cup game in Dallas/Fort Worth in 32 years. The Netherlands and Japan tie 2–2.
- June 22, 2026 – 2026 FIFA World Cup group stage. Lionel Messi scores twice to set the all-time World Cup scoring record. Argentina defeats Austria 2–0.
- June 27, 2026 – 2026 FIFA World Cup group stage. Lionel Messi becomes the first player to score in seven consecutive World Cup matches. Argentina defeats Jordan 3–1.

==== 2026 FIFA World Cup ====
AT&T Stadium hosted nine matches during the 2026 FIFA World Cup, which was organized and hosted across the United States, Canada and Mexico. It was also one of two venues in Texas which were selected to host matches, the other being Reliant Stadium in Houston. The stadium underwent renovations in the years prior to the start of the tournament. Prior to the start of the tournament, the stadium temporarily changed its name to "Dallas Stadium" in accordance with FIFA's policy on corporate sponsored names. The stadium hosted the most matches of any venue in the tournament. Those nine matches included five group stage matches, two Round of 32 matches, one Round of 16 match, and one semifinal match.

Date	Time (UTC−5)	Team #1	Result	Team #2	Round	Attendance
June 14, 2026	15:00	Netherlands	2–2	Japan	Group F	69,285
June 17, 2026	15:00	England	4–2	Croatia	Group L	70,389
June 22, 2026	12:00	Argentina	2–0	Austria	Group J	70,649
June 25, 2026	18:00	Japan	1–1	Sweden	Group F	70,137
June 27, 2026	21:00	Jordan	1–3	Argentina	Group J	70,649
June 30, 2026	12:00	Ivory Coast	1–2	Norway	Round of 32	69,665
July 3, 2026	13:00	Australia	1–1 (a.e.t.); 2–4 (pen.)	Egypt	Round of 32	70,244
July 6, 2026	14:00	Portugal	0–1	Spain	Round of 16	70,649
July 14, 2026	14:00	France	0–2	Spain	Semifinal	70,176

=== Boxing ===
The stadium has hosted multiple world championship boxing fights since its opening, as the large capacity and retractable roof make it an ideal venue for boxing events throughout the year. Many of the sport's biggest stars including Manny Pacquiao and Canelo Álvarez have headlined championship bouts there.

- March 13, 2010 - The Event: Before a crowd of 50,994, Manny Pacquiao recorded a unanimous decision over Joshua Clottey to retain his WBO welterweight title.
- November 13, 2010 – The Eighth Wonder of the World: In front of 41,734 fans, Manny Pacquiao defeated Antonio Margarito to win the WBC super welterweight title. In doing so, he made history in becoming the first fighter to win world titles in 8 different weight classes.
- September 17, 2016 – Before a crowd of 51,420, Canelo Álvarez defeated Liam Smith by knockout in round nine to win the WBO light middleweight title. The event broke the then-AT&T Stadium attendance record for boxing.
- March 16, 2019 - Before a crowd of 47,525, Errol Spence Jr. defended his IBF welterweight title in his 12-round shutout of undefeated four-division world champion Mikey Garcia on Fox Sports PPV.
- December 5, 2020 - In front of 16,978 fans due to COVID-19 restrictions, Errol Spence Jr. defeated Danny García by unanimous decision in 12 rounds.
- May 8, 2021 - Face The Fearless: Before a crowd of 73,126 people, which broke the all-time attendance record for a boxing event at an indoor venue in the United States, Canelo Álvarez unified the WBA (Super), WBC and WBO super-middleweight titles when he beat undefeated two-division world champion Billy Joe Saunders by eighth-round corner retirement.
- April 15, 2022 - Errol Spence Jr. unified the WBA (Super), WBC and IBF welterweight titles when he beat Yordenis Ugas by tenth-round knockout before a crowd of 40,828.
- November 5, 2024, YouTuber-turned-professional boxer Jake Paul defeated former undisputed heavyweight world champion Mike Tyson in a unanimous decision before a crowd of 72,300.See: Jake Paul vs. Mike Tyson. The bout was streamed globally on Netflix, with 65 million people watching the event concurrently.

=== WrestleMania ===
AT&T Stadium hosted WWE's WrestleMania 32 on April 3, 2016. It was the third WrestleMania to be hosted in Texas. The area also hosted activities throughout the region for the week-long celebration leading up to WrestleMania itself. 101,763 people attended the event breaking the previous WrestleMania attendance record set at WrestleMania III.

On April 2 and 3, 2022, the stadium hosted WrestleMania 38. 131,372 people attended the two night event.

=== Supercross ===
AT&T Stadium has hosted a round of the AMA Supercross Championship since 2010, replacing Texas Stadium, which had been host since 1975.

=== Ice Hockey ===
AT&T Stadium is set to host the 2027 NHL Stadium Series between the Dallas Stars and the Vegas Golden Knights. The game is scheduled for February 20, 2027.

=== Concerts ===
Date	Artist	Opening act(s)	Tour / Concert name	Attendance	Revenue	Notes
2009
June 6, 2009	George Strait	Reba McEntire; Blake Shelton; Lee Ann Womack		60,188 / 60,188	$5,340,005	Very first concert at the stadium Stadium project was not finished yet
June 20, 2009	Jonas Brothers	Honor Society; Jessie James; Jordin Sparks; Wonder Girls	Jonas Brothers World Tour 2009	—N/a	—N/a	Stadium project was not finished yet
August 19, 2009	Paul McCartney	—N/a	Summer Live '09	35,903 / 35,903	$5,054,620	Stadium project complete
October 12, 2009	U2	Muse	U2 360° Tour	70,766 / 70,766	$6,664,880	To make room for the large claw-shaped stage, the video board was raised 25 feet (7.6 m) and was not used during the concert
2011
April 16, 2011	Kenny Chesney	Zac Brown Band; Billy Currington; Uncle Kracker	Goin' Coastal Tour	46,551 / 47,256	$4,173,338	
October 8, 2011	Taylor Swift	Needtobreathe; Charlie Worsham	Speak Now World Tour	55,451 / 55,451	$4,337,062	B.o.B was the special guest.
2012
June 9, 2012	Kenny Chesney; Tim McGraw	Grace Potter and the Nocturnals; Jake Owen	Brothers of the Sun Tour	47,269 / 50,425	$4,421,768	
2013
May 11, 2013	Kenny Chesney; Eric Church	Eli Young Band; Kacey Musgraves	No Shoes Nation Tour	47,269 / 50,425	$4,421,768	
May 25, 2013	Taylor Swift	Ed Sheeran; Austin Mahone; Florida Georgia Line	The Red Tour	53,020 / 53,020	$4,589,266	
2014
June 7, 2014	George Strait	Martina McBride	The Cowboy Rides Away Tour	104,793 / 104,793	$18,194,374	Jason Aldean, Kenny Chesney, Eric Church, Ronnie Dunn, Vince Gill, Faith Hill, Alan Jackson, Miranda Lambert, Lee Ann Womack, and Asleep at the Wheel joined Strait for his "last show ever"
May 25, 2014	Beyoncé; Jay-Z	—N/a	On the Run Tour	41,463 / 41,463	$5,050,479	
August 24, 2014	One Direction	Jamie Scott	Where We Are Tour	51,074 / 51,074	$4,517,012	
2015
April 19, 2015	—N/a	—N/a	50th Academy of Country Music Awards	70,252	—N/a	
June 6, 2015	The Rolling Stones	—N/a	Zip Code Tour	47,535 / 47,535	$9,294,552	
October 17, 2015	Taylor Swift	Vance Joy; Shawn Mendes	The 1989 World Tour	62,630 / 62,630	$7,396,733	Ellie Goulding was a special guest. They performed Goulding's 2015 hit Love Me Like You Do.
2016
May 9, 2016	Beyoncé	DJ Khaled	The Formation World Tour	42,235 / 42,235	$5,954,775	
August 3, 2016	Guns N' Roses	The Cult	Not in This Lifetime... Tour	39,015 / 43,449	$4,786,948	
August 27, 2016	Coldplay	Alessia Cara; Bishop Briggs	A Head Full of Dreams Tour	52,538 / 52,538	$5,679,031	
October 22, 2016	Luke Bryan	Chris Stapleton; Little Big Town; Dustin Lynch	Kill the Lights Tour	41,638 / 45,000	$3,613,825	
2017
March 25, 2017	Performers: Demi Lovato; The Band Perry; Jake Owen; Cole Swindell	—N/a	A Concert For The Causes	—N/a	$2,000,000	Randy Travis was a special guest
May 26, 2017	U2	The Lumineers	The Joshua Tree Tour 2017	49,087 / 49,087	$6,044,330	
June 16, 2017	Metallica	Avenged Sevenfold; Local H Mix Master Mike	WorldWired Tour	45,860 / 45,860	$5,481,881	
2018
May 19, 2018	Kenny Chesney	Thomas Rhett; Old Dominion; Brandon Lay	Trip Around the Sun Tour	46,274 / 48,625	$3,770,669	
September 11, 2018	Beyoncé; Jay-Z	Chloe X Halle; DJ Khaled	On the Run II Tour	41,626 / 41,626	$5,713,125	
October 5, 2018	Taylor Swift	Camila Cabello; Charli XCX	Taylor Swift's Reputation Stadium Tour	105,002 / 105,002	$15,006,157	Maren Morris was the special guest at the first show. Taylor and Maren performed "The Middle". Sugarland were the special guests on the second show. They performed their collaboration with Swift "Babe". Netflix also captured the night for their Reputation Tour Film on Netflix.
October 6, 2018	Taylor Swift	Camila Cabello; Charli XCX	Taylor Swift's Reputation Stadium Tour	105,002 / 105,002	$15,006,157	Maren Morris was the special guest at the first show. Taylor and Maren performed "The Middle". Sugarland were the special guests on the second show. They performed their collaboration with Swift "Babe". Netflix also captured the night for their Reputation Tour Film on Netflix.
October 27, 2018	Ed Sheeran	Snow Patrol; Lauv	÷ Tour	46,249 / 46,249	$4,528,561	
2019
November 2, 2019	Post Malone	Performers Meek Mill; Pharrell Williams; Rae Sremmurd; Jaden Smith; Dominic Fike; Doja Cat; Yella Beezy; Tyla Yaweh; Saint Jhn; Iann Dior; Beach Fossils; Snowy; Maj; Kerwin Frost; G-Eazy	Posty Fest			
2022
June 4, 2022	Kenny Chesney	Dan + Shay; Old Dominion; Carly Pearce	Here and Now Tour	50,033 / 50,033	$4,588,994	
July 30, 2022	Garth Brooks	Matt Rossi; Trisha Yearwood	The Garth Brooks Stadium Tour	TBA	TBA	
August 14, 2022	The Weeknd	Snoh Aalegra; Mike Dean	After Hours til Dawn Stadium Tour	49,783 / 49,783	$8,043,625	
September 9, 2022	Bad Bunny	Alesso	World's Hottest Tour	54,637 / 54,637	$12,384,432	
2023
March 31, 2023	Taylor Swift	Muna; Gayle	The Eras Tour	210,607 / 210,607	—	First artist ever to perform and sell out three straight days Highest three-day attendance in stadium history.
April 1, 2023	Taylor Swift	Beabadoobee; Gracie Abrams	The Eras Tour	210,607 / 210,607	—	First artist ever to perform and sell out three straight days Highest three-day attendance in stadium history.
April 2, 2023	Taylor Swift	Beabadoobee; Gracie Abrams	The Eras Tour	210,607 / 210,607	—	First artist ever to perform and sell out three straight days Highest three-day attendance in stadium history.
May 6, 2023	Ed Sheeran	Khalid; Dylan	+–=÷× Tour	59,265 / 59,265	$5,733,414	
August 18, 2023	Metallica	Pantera; Mammoth WVH	M72 World Tour	139,630 / 139,630	$18,524,712	
August 20, 2023	Metallica	Five Finger Death Punch; Ice Nine Kills	M72 World Tour	139,630 / 139,630	$18,524,712	
September 21, 2023	Beyoncé	-	Renaissance World Tour	52,953 / 52,953	$13,849,491	
2024
March 9, 2024	Billy Joel; Stevie Nicks		Two Icons, One Night 2024			
May 11, 2024	Kenny Chesney; Zac Brown Band	Megan Moroney; Uncle Kracker	Sun Goes Down 2024 Tour			
May 17, 2024	Kid Rock		Kid Rock's Rock N Rodeo			
July 25, 2024	Morgan Wallen	Jelly Roll; Nate Smith; Bryan Martin	One Night At A Time World Tour			
July 26, 2024	Morgan Wallen	TBD; Nate Smith; Bryan Martin	One Night At A Time World Tour			
August 17, 2024	Zach Bryan	Levi Turner; Jason Isbell and the 400 Unit	Quittin Time Tour			
2025
April 14, 2025	AC/DC	The Pretty Reckless	Power Up Tour			
April 26, 2025	Kendrick Lamar; SZA		Grand National Tour			
May 9, 2025	Post Malone; Jelly Roll	Sierra Ferrell	Big Ass Stadium Tour			
August 27, 2025	The Weeknd	Playboi Carti; Mike Dean	After Hours til Dawn Tour			
August 28, 2025	The Weeknd	Playboi Carti; Mike Dean	After Hours til Dawn Tour			
2026
August 15, 2026	BTS		Arirang World Tour			
August 16, 2026	BTS		Arirang World Tour			
August 22, 2026	Zach Bryan	Fey Fili; Ryan Bingham and the Texas Gentlemen	With Heaven On Tour			
August 28, 2026	Zach Bryan					
September 10, 2026	Usher; Chris Brown		The R&B Tour			
September 12, 2026	Usher; Chris Brown		The R&B Tour			
September 13, 2026	Usher; Chris Brown		The R&B Tour			
October 15, 2026	Karol G		Viajando Por El Mundo Tropitour			
October 24, 2026	Ed Sheeran	Lukas Graham; Aaron Rowe	Loop Tour			Macklemore was removed as an opening act when AT&T Stadium and other venues would not allow him to perform.
November 7, 2026	Kanye West		Ye Live Concert Tour			
2027
April 3, 2027	Luke Combs	Treaty Oak Revival; Avery Anna; Shenandoah; Wyatt McCubbin	My Kinda Saturday Night Tour			
April 9, 2027	Harry Styles	CA7RIEL & PACO AMOROSO	Together, Together			
April 10, 2027	Harry Styles	CA7RIEL & PACO AMOROSO	Together, Together			
April 14, 2027	Harry Styles	CA7RIEL & PACO AMOROSO	Together, Together			
April 16, 2027	Harry Styles	CA7RIEL & PACO AMOROSO	Together, Together			
April 17, 2027	Harry Styles	CA7RIEL & PACO AMOROSO	Together, Together			
May 8, 2027	Kenny Chesney	Eric Church; Sheryl Crow; Greylan James	The Original Vibe Room Tour			
June 3, 2027	Stray Kids		Run It World Tour			

=== Other events ===
- September 5, 2009 – Led by a strong defensive effort and quarterback Max Hall's 329 yards passing, No. 20 BYU defeated No. 3 Oklahoma 14–13 in the first college game played in the new Dallas Cowboys Stadium in Arlington, Texas.
- September 7, 2009 – The first high school football game played at Cowboys Stadium was between Euless Trinity and Bingham (Utah). Trinity won, 42–21.
- November 12, 2009 – The first Texas high school football playoff game played at Cowboys Stadium was between Bowie High School (Arlington, Texas) and Richland High School (North Richland Hills; Texas).
- February 2010 – The Professional Bull Riders hosted the Dickies Iron Cowboy Invitational in February 2010.
- February 2010 – The first MDA Muscle Walk in the Dallas-Fort Worth area took place. This event was held annually, having returned in 2011, 2012, and 2013. That event has since moved to Globe Life Park in Arlington (formerly Rangers Ballpark) starting in 2014.

Several participants walk at the 2013 DFW MDA Muscle Walk; then known as Cowboys Stadium.

- February 27, 2010 – The stadium hosted its first Monster Jam event with 11 trucks. This event is now held annually, having returned in 2011 and scheduled for 2012 and onward.
- June 30, 2011 – The final round of the 2011 US Women's Open in bowling was played at Cowboys Stadium, with Leanne Hulsenberg winning.
- Dec. 7 – 17, 2011 – Cowboys Stadium hosted all the Texas 11-man football state championships for the first time. It was also the first time all 11-man state championships were held in one location.
- February 2011 – The Professional Bull Riders hosted the Dickies Iron Cowboy Invitational in February 2011.
- February 2012 – The Professional Bull Riders hosted the Dickies Iron Cowboy Invitational in February 2012.
- February 2013 – The Professional Bull Riders hosted the Dickies Iron Cowboy Invitational in February 2013.
- February 11, 2013 – American Sniper Chris Kyle's memorial ceremony proceeded by a 200-mile (320 km) procession across Texas.
- March 2014 – The Professional Bull Riders hosted the Dickies Iron Cowboy Invitational in February 2014.
- March 2014 – The inaugural The American Rodeo was held.
- April 26, 2014 – AT&T Stadium hosted the senior prom of South Garland High School.
- June 27 – 29, 2014 – International Assembly of Jehovah's Witnesses
- July 6, 2014 – Semi-pro football (EFL) held its first indoor Pro Bowl game.
- July 25–27, 2014 – International Assembly of Jehovah's Witnesses
- February 2015 – The Professional Bull Riders hosted the Choctaw Casino Resort Iron Cowboy in February 2015.
- March 2015 – The American Rodeo was held.
- March 7, 2015 – The 2015 AT&T American Cup, an FIG World Cup event, is held at the stadium.
- June 20, 2015 – AT&T Stadium hosted thousands of Spartans for Reebok's Spartan Race.
- January 12, 2016 – The world premiere of 13 Hours: The Secret Soldiers of Benghazi was shown on the stadium's high-definition video board. It was attended by over 30,000 people.
- February 2016 – The Professional Bull Riders hosted the Choctaw Casino Resort Iron Cowboy in February 2016.
- February 2016 – The American Rodeo was held.
- March 6, 2016 – Greg Laurie's Harvest America took place at the stadium. It is considered the largest evangelical event ever. Special guests included Chris Tomlin, Lecrae, MercyMe, and Switchfoot.
- February 2017 – The Professional Bull Riders hosted the Choctaw Casino Resort Iron Cowboy in February 2017.
- February 2017 – The American Rodeo was held.
- February 2018 – The Professional Bull Riders hosted the WinStar World Casino and Resort Iron Cowboy in 2018.
- February 2018 – The American Rodeo was held.
- February 2019 – The third PBR Global Cup took place at AT&T Stadium.
- March 2019 – The American Rodeo was held.
- February 2020 – The fourth PBR Global Cup was held.
- March 2020 – The American Rodeo was held.
- November 2020 – The annual PBR World Finals took place at AT&T Stadium after being moved from Las Vegas due to Nevada state restrictions stemming from the COVID-19 pandemic.
- March 2021 – The American Rodeo was held.
- February 2022 – The fifth PBR Global Cup was held.
- March 2022 – The American Rodeo was held.
- May 2024 – Kid Rock's Rock n' Rodeo was held.
- May 2024 – The final two days of the 2024 PBR World Finals were held.
- November 2, 2024 - Major League Wiffle Ball hosted its 2024 World Series at the stadium.
- May 2025 – Kid Rock's Rock n' Rodeo was held.
- March 2026 – Grand Prix of Arlington's course featured AT&T Stadium.

== Concessions and merchandising ==
On October 20, 2008, Cowboys owner Jones and New York Yankees owner George Steinbrenner announced a joint business venture called Legends Hospitality Management LLC that would operate the concessions and merchandising sales at the new Cowboys stadium in Arlington, Texas, and at the new Yankee Stadium in the Bronx, New York, along with the stadiums of the Yankees' minor league affiliates. Former Pizza Hut President Michael Rawlings will run the company from its new headquarters in Newark, New Jersey. The company was also backed by Wall Street investment firm Goldman Sachs and Dallas private equity firm CIC Partners LP.

== Art collection ==
The Jones family commissioned 18 contemporary artists to create site-specific artworks for the stadium. The stadium features paintings, sculptures, and installations by Franz Ackermann, Doug Aitken, Ricci Albenda, Mel Bochner, Daniel Buren, Olafur Eliasson, Teresita Fernandez, Wayne Gonzales, Terry Haggerty, Trenton Doyle Hancock, Jacqueline Humphries, Jim Isermann, Annette Lawrence, Dave Muller, Gary Simmons, and Lawrence Weiner.

In 2013, the stadium acquired Sky Mirror, a sculpture by Anish Kapoor. It sits in a plaza outside the east end of the stadium.

== Transportation ==
=== Parking ===
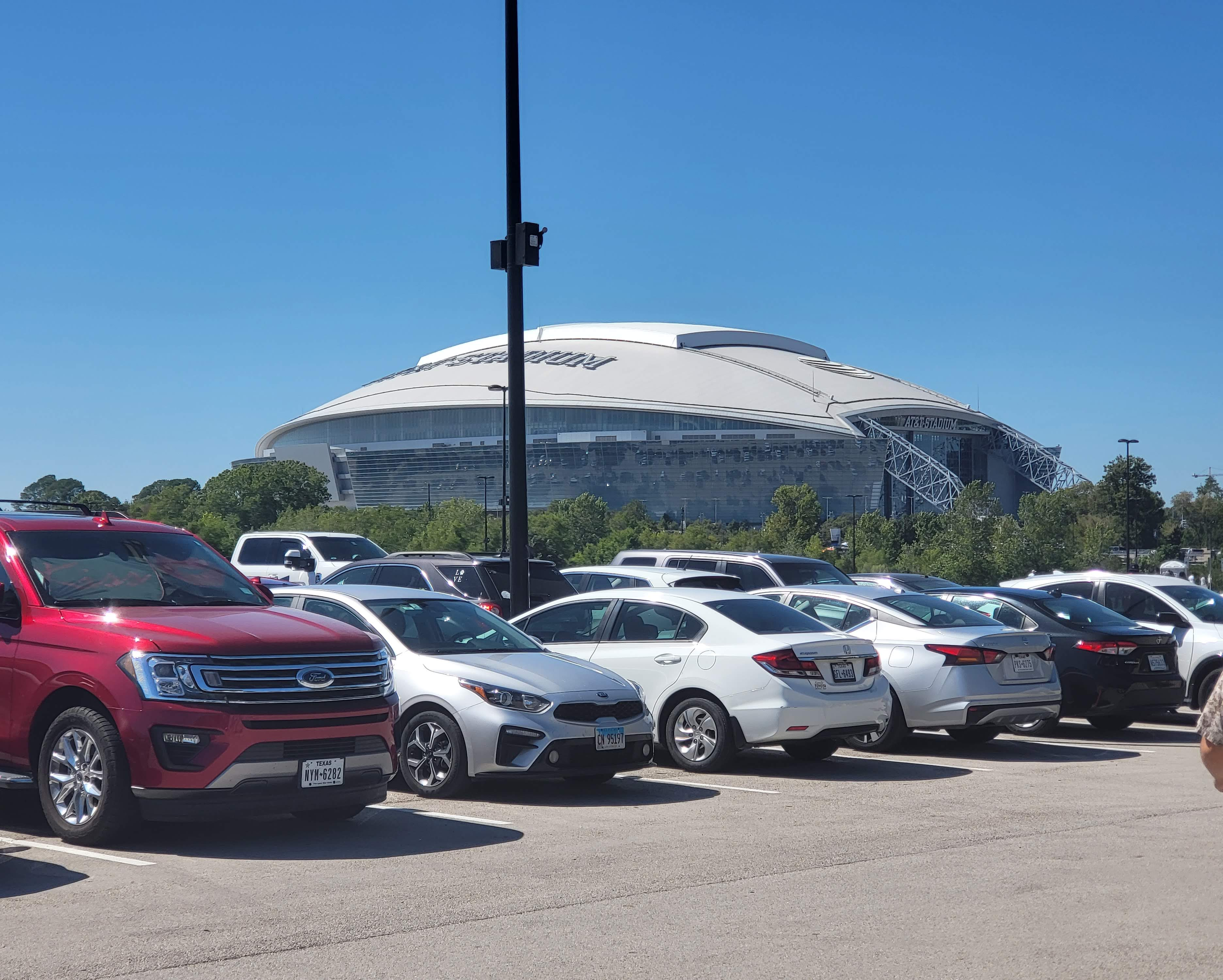
Parking at AT&T Stadium for a Dallas Cowboys game in 2022.

The fees for premium parking at Dallas Cowboys games are estimated at $75 per game, based on season ticket holder parking charges. The fees to park at major concerts and other sporting events will be nearly $40 per space at the new stadium. A shuttle operates between the T&P Station and AT&T Stadium for all Cowboys regular season and postseason games and selected college football games, which averages approximately 900 riders per game. For special events like Super Bowl XLV parking prices can increase to as much as $990.

=== Public transit ===
The stadium was only accessible via the weekday-only Metro Arlington Xpress (MAX) bus system; a 0.4 mi (0.64 km) walk from the Collins and Andrews stop that connected with the Trinity Rail Express (TRE) station at CentrePort/DFW Airport. The bus system was an experimental program operated by Dallas Area Rapid Transit that commenced in April 2013 and was replaced by a ride-sharing service in December 2017. Although the replacement service offers connections at CentrePort/DFW Airport station, it does not operate on Sundays.

== Criticisms ==
=== Video boards ===
Since its opening, the unorthodox size and positioning of the video boards above the field has been the source of controversy, specifically due to its interference with punts on multiple occasions. During the stadium's first preseason game, on August 21, 2009, a punt by Tennessee Titans punter A. J. Trapasso hit the scoreboard. By rule, the down was replayed. Jerry Jones later remarked that Trapasso was trying to hit the scoreboard, saying, "If you look at how you punt the football, unless you're trying to hit the scoreboard, you punt the ball to get downfield. You certainly want to get some hangtime, but you punt the ball to get downfield, and you sure don't punt the ball down the middle. You punt it off to the side." Whether the screen would affect an opposing team's punting strategy has been debated. For teams with strategies centered on maximizing hang time, physicist Christopher Moore of Longwood University has shown via computer simulation that well-kicked punts have the potential to hit the screen no matter the field position. Trapasso disputed Jones' suggestion that he was intentionally trying to hit the board, and other NFL punters have suggested that the board may pose a problem for longer hang-time punts. The screen was retrofitted with 16 custom winches using 11,000 feet (3,400 m) of 1.5 inches (3.8 cm) domestic galvanized wire rope to transport the video board in time to make room for U2's massive set during their 360° Tour, and was moved back down after the concert. The video board is also the primary attachment point for up to 370,000 pounds (170,000 kg) of concert and theatrical rigging.

On August 24, 2013, during a preseason game against the Cincinnati Bengals, Cowboys punter Chris Jones became the second player to hit the scoreboard. He conceded a touchdown on the rekick. Other punters to hit the scoreboard with an in-game kick include Bryan Anger and Jake Camarda.

=== Sunlight glare ===
AT&T Stadium's field was constructed on an east–west orientation, and despite being a domed stadium, it features large glass windows behind both end zones. The majority of NFL stadiums are built with the field set in a north–south orientation to avoid sun glare. For stadium sites which require an east–west layout, teams either use blackout curtains or sliding opaque panels to filter or block sunlight, or limit large windows to sides of the building where direct sunlight is not an issue. AT&T Stadium does have curtains, which are used for other events but never closed during Cowboys games. As a result, during Sunday late afternoon Cowboys games starting between 3:05–3:25 p.m. Central, the sunset has created a glare that shines through the stadium's windows behind the west end zone, which have at times interfered with players' vision. Wide receivers have complained about being unable to see the ball being thrown to them due to the glare, and kick/punt returners have complained about being unable to see the ball being kicked towards them.

In a 2024 game against the Philadelphia Eagles, Cowboys wide receiver CeeDee Lamb appeared to miss a potential touchdown throw from quarterback Cooper Rush due to the sunlight glare. In a postgame interview, Lamb stated: "I couldn’t see the ball. Couldn’t see the ball, at all. The sun." When asked if he was in favor of using the stadium's existing curtains to block the sunlight (which are used for other non-football events), Lamb responded: "Yes. One thousand percent."

When asked about the sunlight issue, Jerry Jones stated: "We do know where the damn sun's going to be at our own stadium", and when asked about closing the existing curtains during games, Jones rejected the idea, saying, "Well, let's just tear the damn stadium down and build another one? You kidding me?...Everybody's got the same thing...Every team that comes in here has the same issues. They know where the sun's going to be. Every team has the same thing." Ironically, the Cowboys had to jury-rig a shade for head coach Mike McCarthy's press conference the day after Lamb's comments, as the sun was shining right into his eyes.

== See also ==
- History of the Dallas Cowboys
- Globe Life Field
- List of tallest domes
- Lists of stadiums

Preceded by Texas Stadium	Home of the Dallas Cowboys; 2009 – present	Succeeded by current
Preceded by Arrowhead Stadium	Home of the Big 12 Championship Game; 2009–2010, 2017	Succeeded by current
Preceded by Georgia Dome; Lucas Oil Stadium	NCAA Men's Division I Basketball Tournament; Finals Venue; 2014; 2030	Succeeded by Lucas Oil Stadium; Mercedes-Benz Stadium
Preceded by Sun Life Stadium	Host of the Super Bowl; XLV 2011	Succeeded by Lucas Oil Stadium
Preceded by first stadium	Home of the College Football Playoff National Championship; 2015	Succeeded by University of Phoenix Stadium
Preceded by Levi's Stadium; Raymond James Stadium	Host of WrestleMania; 2016 (32); 2022 (38)	Succeeded by Camping World Stadium; SoFi Stadium
Preceded by Philadelphia City Hall; 2017	Venues of the NFL draft 2018	Succeeded by Nissan Stadium; 2019
Preceded by US Airways Center	Host of the NBA All-Star Game; 2010	Succeeded by Staples Center
