= Ricci Albenda =

American painter and sculptor

- Born: 1966 (age 59–60)
- Education: Rhode Island School of Design
- Occupations: Contemporary visual artist and sculptor

Ricci Albenda (born 1966) is an American contemporary visual artist and sculptor. He specializes in three-dimensional representations of distorted architectural spaces and walls of words. His work has been covered by The New York Times repeatedly, which said "[t]he effect is cool, weird, magical" about a project in PS1 and "it's a warped, sexualized, through-the-looking-glass version of the chaste but uninnocent 'white cube' space of modern art" about the reviewed work which, however, "doesn't look nearly as good, but it shares similar features, and is based on ambitious ideas"; "very fetching;" "the words come and go, and the wall seems to buckle and swell." He received his MFA from the Rhode Island School of Design in 1988. He is represented by the Andrew Kreps Gallery. He had a solo exhibition at the Museum of Modern Art in New York from November 16, 2001, to January 22, 2002. On Friday March 21, 2008, he opened his back yard to the public as an adjunct to an exhibition at the Horticultural Society of New York.

== Public Commissions ==
- AT&T Stadium of the Dallas Cowboys in Arlington, TX, 2010
- Penny Pritzker, Hyatt Center, Chicago, 2005

== Exhibitions ==
- Museum of Modern Art, New York, NY – Projects 74 – November 16, 2001 – May 2002.
- The Rachofsky House, Dallas, TX – The quick brown fox jumps over the lazy dog – May 11 – Jul 22, 2009.
- Andrew Kreps Gallery, New York, NY – Panoramas – May 5 – Jun. 16, 2007.
- Andrew Kreps Gallery, New York, NY – Paintings – Sept. 16 – Oct. 23, 2010.
