= Bryan Trubey =

American architect

Bryan K. Trubey
- Born: Bryan K. Trubey; Dallas, Texas
- Education: Texas A&M University, Bachelor of Environmental Design
- Occupation: architect
- Buildings: Globe Life Field, AT&T Stadium, Lucas Oil Field, U.S. Bank Stadium

Bryan K. Trubey, FAIA, is an American architect specializing in sports and entertainment facilities.

== Early life ==
Bryan Trubey grew up in the Oak Cliff neighborhood of Dallas, Texas.

== Education ==
Trubey holds a Bachelor of Environmental Design degree from Texas A&M University.

== Career ==
Trubey began his architectural career in Arlington, Texas working for the architectural firm of Harry Allison. He later worked in Chicago for HOK, where he first became involved in sports architecture.

In 1992, Trubey began work with the architectural firm HKS, Inc. During his nearly three-decade career at HKS, Trubey would work as a design principal, eventually serving as a Global Director and Executive Vice President, as well as head of the firm's sports practice. While at HKS, Trubey worked on many notable projects, including sports facilities used by the Dallas Mavericks, Dallas Stars, Texas Rangers, Dallas Cowboys, Minnesota Vikings, Los Angeles Rams, Los Angeles Chargers and Indianapolis Colts. Trubey's international projects include the Territorio Santos Modelo in Mexico, venues for the 2014 FIFA World Cup in Brazil, the Royal Arena in Copenhagen, and a planned stadium for Liverpool FC. He is known for combining the sports environment with entertainment, often incorporating retractable roofs and numerous display screens into his designs.

In 2016, Trubey was named one of the 50 Most Influential People in Sports Facility Design, Architecture and Development by Sports Business Journal.

In 2021, Trubey left HKS, and three months later joined Overland Partners, a San Antonio based architectural firm, along with many of his other colleagues who had also recently departed from HKS. With this change, Overland Partners expanded to open new office space in Dallas to accommodate Trubey and his team.

== Honors ==
Trubey is a Fellow member of the American Institute of Architects (FAIA), the Texas Society of Architects, as well as the Dallas chapter of the AIA.

Trubey's design for the Hong Kong Jockey Club Stadium won the American Institute of Architects National Design Award.

In spring 2016, he was awarded the Thomas Bullock Endowed Chair in Leadership and Innovation at the Texas A&M College of Architecture, allowing him to teach a semester at the institution.

== Notable projects ==
- Globe Life Field, Arlington, Texas
- American Airlines Center, Dallas, Texas (sports architect)
- AT&T Stadium, Arlington, Texas
- Lone Star Park, Grand Prairie, Texas
- Toyota Stadium (Texas), Frisco, Texas
- U.S. Bank Stadium, Minneapolis, Minnesota
- Lucas Oil Stadium, Indianapolis, Indiana
- Royal Arena, Copenhagen, Denmark
- Territorio Santos Modelo, Torreón, Mexico
- SoFi Stadium, Los Angeles, California
- Stanley Park Stadium for Liverpool F.C., Liverpool, England (planned)
