= Wayne Gonzales =

American painter

- Born: 1957 (age 68–69); New Orleans, Louisiana, US
- Education: University of New Orleans

Wayne Gonzales (born 1957) is an American painter, whose work confronts the conversations between photography, history, and memory. He is based in New York City.

== Early life and education ==
Wayne Gonzales was born in 1957 in New Orleans, Louisiana. He grew up on the same street as Lee Harvey Oswald, which inspired his later art work. Gonzales earned a Bachelor of Arts degree in 1985, from the University of New Orleans.

He moved to New York City in the late 1980s. Early in his career Gonzales worked as a studio assistant for artist Peter Halley. His first solo exhibition was in 1997.

== Work ==
Gonzales' paintings depict scenes of American Culture by using sources of imagery often taken from mass media and the internet. He uses factual components to find instinctive connections to abstraction through painting. Up close, the paintings appear pixelated; once glanced from a far the pixelation comes together and forms an intricate image much like Op Art. Gonzales became well known for presenting socially and political imagery, such as his paintings based around the assassination of President John F. Kennedy. This body of work gained much acknowledgement when it opened at Paula Cooper Gallery in 2001.

His work has traveled to galleries and museums across the world where he has exhibited in group and solo shows.

=== Collections ===
- Albright-Knox Art Gallery, Buffalo, New York, United States
- Dallas Museum of Art, Dallas, Texas, United States
- Solomon R. Guggenheim Museum, New York City, New York, United States
- Museum of Fine Arts, Boston, Boston, Massachusetts, United States
- Neuberger Museum of Art, Purchase, New York, United States
- Whitney Museum of American Art, New York, United States
