= Facility Solutions Group =

Facility Solutions Group (FSG)
- Industry: Construction; Services; Distribution; Energy Management
- Founded: 1982
- Founder: Bill Graham; Stephen Byrne
- Headquarters: Austin, Texas, USA
- Number of locations: Six divisions, 30 branches, four regional distribution centers
- Area served: United States; Canada; Puerto Rico
- Key people: Jason Zipprian; (CEO); Bill Graham; (Chairman & CFO); Jeremy Ripley; (COO Construction); Leon Mowadia; (COO Distribution); Victor Williams; (COO Service); Brannon Bourland; (CMO)
- Products: Chariot Enterprise energy management system
- Services: Commercial Lighting; Electrical Contracting; Electrical Construction; Enterprise Energy Management; Sign Fabrication; Low Voltage Cabling; AV Design; Electric Vehicle Charging Station Installation; Indoor Air Quality Solutions; Solar & Renewable Energy
- Revenue: $920+ million (2024)
- Number of employees: 3,000+
- Divisions: Construction, Lighting, Electrical, Smart Buildings, Technology, Signs
- Website: fsg.com

Facility Solutions Group (FSG) is a company headquartered in Austin, Texas, that provides lighting, electrical and energy management products and services in the United States and Canada.

== Company history, structure and services ==
FSG is a privately held company and was founded as American Light in 1982 by Chairman Bill Graham and COO Steve Byrne. Chief Marketing and Sales Officer Bob Graham joined American Light in 1985. An electrical services company, Design Electric, was established in 1986; a national accounts division in 1995; and a smart building division in 1998. In 2000, American Light and Design Electric combined to form Facility Solutions Group. As of August 2018, FSG had six divisions, 42 branches, four regional distribution centers and 2,300 employees serving customers in all 50 states, Canada and Puerto Rico. FSG is a privately held company. The six FSG divisions are Construction, Lighting, Electrical, Smart Buildings, Technology, and Signs.

In 2023, FSG acquired Lighting Management, Inc. (LMI), a lighting services company with offices in New York, North Carolina, South Carolina, and Florida, expanding its national lighting service offerings. In 2024, FSG acquired Greenleaf Energy Solutions, a commercial solar and renewable energy provider, further expanding its energy services capabilities. By 2024, FSG reported combined revenues of over $920 million, ranking among the top 2% of electrical contractors nationally, with more than 3,000 employees serving customers in all 50 states, Canada and Puerto Rico.

In March 2026, FSG named Jason Zipprian as Chief Executive Officer. A 30-year FSG veteran who began his career as an apprentice electrician, Zipprian previously served as Chief Operating Officer of FSG's Construction division. Bill Graham, FSG's founder, transitioned to the role of Chairman of the Board and CFO.

== Projects and clients ==
FSG Signs installed the "AT&T Stadium" letters on top of AT&T Stadium in Arlington, Texas. AT&T Stadium is the home of the Dallas Cowboys. The signage includes two sets of 43-foot-tall letters stretching 385 feet. The letters are made of lightweight components and aluminum and are insulated and heated to melt ice and snow. They have 36,000 LED lights using 52 amps of power, or the amount used by 144 100-watt light bulbs. FSG also worked with a national coffee retailer to upgrade lighting to LED fixtures in 9300 locations, in less than 9 months.

FSG Smart Buildings clients include Circle K, Walgreens and Verizon. FSG has completed several projects in conjunction with the Port Authority of New York and New Jersey at Newark Liberty International Airport, including an advanced lighting system upgrade and replacement of the HVAC chillers in the airport's three terminals. Following Hurricane Sandy in October 2012, FSG provided backup generation and services to school districts, hotels, municipal complexes and the Federal Emergency Management Agency (FEMA) headquarters in Garden City, Long Island, New York. FSG implemented the largest North American deployment of networked submeters throughout Simon Property Group's more than 100 shopping malls. The submeters were integrated into an existing energy management system.

FSG Indianapolis delivered the electrical infrastructure for Indiana University Indianapolis' $60 million STEM Lab expansion, a four-story facility designed to support advanced research, healthcare innovation, and hands-on learning, scheduled to open in fall 2026.
