= Fluorosilicate glass =

Fluorosilicate glass (FSG) is a glass material composed primarily of fluorine, silicon and oxygen. It has a number of uses in industry and manufacturing, especially in semiconductor fabrication where it forms an insulating dielectric. The related fluorosilicate glass-ceramics have good mechanical and chemical properties.

== Semiconductor fabrication ==
FSG has a small relative dielectric constant (low-κ dielectric) and is used between metal copper interconnect layers during silicon integrated circuit fabrication process. It is widely used by semiconductor fabrication plants on geometries under 0.25 microns (μ). FSG is effectively a fluorine-containing silicon dioxide (κ=3.5, while κ of undoped silicon dioxide is 3.9). FSG is used by IBM. Intel started using Cu metal layers and FSG on its 1.2 GHz Pentium processor at 130 nm complementary metal–oxide–semiconductor (CMOS). Taiwan Semiconductor Manufacturing Company (TSMC) combined FSG and copper in the Altera APEX.

== Fluorosilicate glass-ceramics ==
Fluorosilicate glass-ceramics are crystalline or semi-crystalline solids formed by careful cooling of molten fluorosilicate glass. They have good mechanical properties.

Potassium fluororichterite based materials are composed from tiny interlocked rod-shaped amphibole crystals; they have good resistance to chemicals and can be used in microwave ovens. Richterite glass-ceramics are used for high-performance tableware.

Fluorosilicate glass-ceramics with sheet structure, derived from mica, are strong and machinable. They find a number of uses and can be used in high vacuum and as dielectrics and precision ceramic components. A number of mica and mica-fluoroapatite glass-ceramics were studied as biomaterials.

== See also ==
- Fluoride glass
- Glass
- Silicate
