= 2026 New York City FC season =

New York City FC
2026 season
- Head coach: Pascal Jansen
- Stadium: Yankee Stadium (The Bronx, New York); Citi Field (Queens, New York) (6 matches)
- MLS: Conference: 11th Overall: 23rd
- MLS Cup playoffs: Did not qualify
- U.S. Open Cup: Quarterfinals
- Leagues Cup: League phase
- Top goalscorer: League: Nicolás Fernández (16); All: Nicolás Fernández (16)
Home colors	Away colors

The 2026 New York City FC season was the club's 12th season in Major League Soccer (MLS), the top division of soccer in the United States. The club played most of its home games at Yankee Stadium and several games at Citi Field. NYCFC began its season on February 22 against the LA Galaxy in Carson; their first home match was on March 7 against Orlando City SC.

== Player movement ==
=== In ===
No.	Pos.	Player	Transferred from	Fee/notes	Date
45	DF	(United States) Kamran Acito	(United States) Duke Blue Devils	Homegrown player	December 22, 2025
27	MF	(United States) Cooper Flax	(United States) Wake Forest Demon Deacons	Homegrown player	December 22, 2025
31	GK	(United States) Mac Learned	(United States) New York City FC II	Free	January 9, 2026
5	DF	(Australia) Kai Trewin	(Australia) Melbourne City FC	Transfer	January 27, 2026
15	DF	(United States) Kevin Pierre	(United States) Georgia Southern Eagles	SuperDraft	February 20, 2026
87	FW	(Spain) Arnau Farnós	(United States) New York City FC II	Free	April 24, 2026
9	FW	(Ivory Coast) Bénie Traoré	(Switzerland) FC Basel	Transfer	June 29, 2026
20	FW	(Brazil) Luighi	(Brazil) Palmeiras	Loan	July 28, 2026
3	DF	(United States) Matt Miazga	(United States) FC Cincinnati	Waivers	September 22, 2026

=== Out ===
No.	Pos.	Player	Transferred to	Fee/notes	Date
80	MF	(United States) Justin Haak	(United States) LA Galaxy	Free	December 29, 2025
35	DF	(Slovenia) Mitja Ilenič	(Poland) Raków Częstochowa	Loan	January 17, 2026
33	DF	(United States) Prince Amponsah	(Canada) Whitecaps FC 2	Free	January 19, 2026
14	FW	(Argentina) Julián Fernández	(Argentina) Rosario Central	Loan	January 27, 2026
9	FW	(Serbia) Jovan Mijatović	(Germany) Eintracht Braunschweig	Loan	January 29, 2026
36	FW	(Chile) Zidane Yáñez	(United States) Huntsville City FC	Loan	June 3, 2026
36	FW	(Chile) Zidane Yáñez	(United States) Nashville SC	Trade	July 20, 2026
99	FW	(Jamaica) Seymour Garfield-Reid	(United States) Sporting Kansas City	Loan	September 3, 2026

== Players and staff ==
=== Roster ===
As of September 22, 2026

Note: Flags indicate national team as defined under FIFA eligibility rules; some limited exceptions apply. Players may hold more than one non-FIFA nationality.

No.	Pos.	Nation	Player
2	DF	USA	Nico Cavallo
3	DF	USA	Matt Miazga
5	DF	AUS	Kai Trewin
6	MF	USA	James Sands
7	MF	ARG	Nicolas Fernandez
8	MF	USA	Andres Perea
9	FW	CIV	Bénie Traoré
10	MF	ARG	Maximiliano Moralez
11	FW	BRA	Talles Magno
13	DF	BRA	Thiago Martins (captain)
15	MF	USA	Kevin Pierre
16	FW	CRC	Alonso Martínez
17	MF	AUT	Hannes Wolf
18	GK	TTO	Greg Ranjitsingh
20	FW	BRA	Luighi (on loan from Palmeiras until December 31, 2026)
21	MF	AUS	Aiden O'Neill

No.	Pos.	Nation	Player
22	DF	IRL	Kevin O'Toole
23	DF	USA	Max Murray
24	DF	JAM	Tayvon Gray
26	FW	ARG	Agustin Ojeda
29	MF	USA	Máximo Carrizo
30	GK	ESA	Tomás Romero
32	MF	USA	Jonathan Shore
34	DF	BRA	Raul Gustavo
35	DF	SLO	Mitja Ilenič
38	DF	USA	Drew Baiera
47	MF	USA	Jacob Arroyave
49	GK	USA	Matt Freese
55	MF	USA	Keaton Parks
87	FW	ESP	Arnau Farnós
88	FW	SLE	Malachi Jones

=== Out on loan ===
Note: Flags indicate national team as defined under FIFA eligibility rules; some limited exceptions apply. Players may hold more than one non-FIFA nationality.

No.	Pos.	Nation	Player
9	FW	SRB	Jovan Mijatović (at Eintracht Braunschweig until December 31, 2026)
14	MF	ARG	Julián Fernández (at Rosario Central until December 31, 2026)
99	FW	JAM	Seymour Garfield-Reid (at Sporting Kansas City until May 31, 2027)

=== Current technical staff ===
Executive
Chief executive officer	Brad Sims
Vice president for partnerships	Andres Gonzalez
Vice president for communications	Sam Cooke
Sporting director	Todd Dunivant
Coaching staff
Head coach	Pascal Jansen
Assistant coach	Mehdi Ballouchy
Assistant coach	Robert Vartughian
Assistant coach	Leon Hapgood
Goalkeeping coach	Danny Cepero
Head Athletic Trainer	Martin Ramiz
Youth technical coordinator	Rodrigo Marion

Last updated: November 9, 2022

== Non-competitive matches ==
=== Preseason ===
February 8, 2026 Coachella Valley Invitational	Los Angeles FC	1–1	New York City FC	Indio, California
1:00 p.m. EST	Bouanga 88'	Report	Fernandez 51'	Stadium: Empire Polo Club

February 11, 2026 Coachella Valley Invitational	Sporting Kansas City	2–1	New York City FC	Indio, California
2:00 p.m. EST	Harris 23'; Joveljic 26'	Report	Ried 50' (pen.)	Stadium: Empire Polo Club

February 14, 2026 Coachella Valley Invitational	New York City FC	0–2	San Jose Earthquakes	Indio, California
4:00 p.m. EST		Report	Bouda 71'; Tsakiris 88' (pen.)	Stadium: Empire Polo Club

== Competitions ==
=== Overview ===
Competition	First match	Last match	Starting round	Final position	Record							
Competition	First match	Last match	Starting round	Final position	Pld	W	D	L	GF	GA	GD	Win %
Major League Soccer	February 22, 2026	November 7, 2026	Matchday 1	TBD	30	8	10	12	43	41	+2	26.67
MLS Cup Playoffs	TBD	TBD	TBD	TBD	0	0	0	0	0	0	+0	—
U.S. Open Cup	April 14, 2026	May 20, 2026	Round of 32	Quarterfinals	3	2	0	1	8	4	+4	66.67
Leagues Cup	August 6, 2026	August 13, 2026	League phase	League phase	3	1	0	2	4	4	+0	33.33
Total					36	11	10	15	55	49	+6	30.56

Last updated: October 17, 2026
Source: Competitions

Win Draw Loss

All matches are in Eastern Time

=== Major League Soccer ===
==== Standings ====
MLS Eastern Conference table (2026)
Pos	Team	Pld	W	L	T	GF	GA	GD	Pts	Qualification
9	FC Cincinnati	34	12	12	10	67	75	−8	46	Qualification for the wild card round
10	New York Red Bulls	34	12	16	6	48	62	−14	42	
11	New York City FC	34	10	12	12	49	45	+4	42	
12	Toronto FC	34	9	13	12	52	67	−15	39	
13	Atlanta United FC	34	9	19	6	43	60	−17	33	

Source: MLS
Rules for classification: 1) points; 2) total wins; 3) total goal differential; 4) total goals scored; 5) fewer disciplinary points; 6) away goal differential; 7) away goals scored; 8) home goals differential; 9) home goals scored; 10) coin toss (2 clubs tied) or drawing of lots (≥3 clubs tied)

Overall MLS standings table
Pos	Team	Pld	W	L	T	GF	GA	GD	Pts
21	Colorado Rapids	34	12	15	7	47	50	−3	43
22	New York Red Bulls	34	12	16	6	48	62	−14	42
23	New York City FC	34	10	12	12	49	45	+4	42
24	Toronto FC	34	9	13	12	52	67	−15	39
25	San Diego FC	34	9	14	11	57	63	−6	38

Source: MLS
Rules for classification: 1) points; 2) total wins; 3) total goal differential; 4) total goals scored; 5) fewer disciplinary points; 6) away goal differential; 7) away goals scored; 8) home goals differential; 9) home goals scored; 10) coin toss (2 clubs tied) or drawing of lots (≥3 clubs tied)

=== Results summary ===
Overall								Home						Away					
Pld	Pts	W	L	T	GF	GA	GD	W	L	T	GF	GA	GD	W	L	T	GF	GA	GD
34	42	10	12	12	49	45	+4	5	6	6	30	24	+6	5	6	6	19	21	−2

Last updated: October 31, 2026
Source: MLS Results
Pld = Matches played; Pts = Points; W = Matches won; T = Matches tied; L = Matches lost; GF = Goals for; GA = Goals against; GD = Goal difference

=== Results by round ===
Round	1	2	3	4	5	6	7	8	9	10	11	12	13	14	15	16	17	18	19	20	21	22	23	24	25	26	27	28	29	30	31	32	33	34
Stadium	A	A	H	H	H	H	A	H	H	A	H	H	H	A	A	A	A	H	H	H	A	A	A	H	H	A	H	A	A	A	A	H	H	A
Result	D	W	W	W	L	D	L	L	D	L	L	W	W	D	L	W	W	D	L	L	D	D	D	L	W	L	D	L	L	D	D	W	D	W
Points	1	4	7	10	10	11	11	11	12	12	12	15	18	19	19	22	25	26	26	26	27	28	29	29	32	32	33	33	33	34	35	38	39	42
Position (East)	6	3	1	1	2	2	4	7	7	7	9	7	5	5	8	6	5	5	7	7	7	7	7	9	8	10	9	10	10	12	12	12	11	11

Source: Match reports
A = Away; H = Home; N = Neutral; W = Win; D = Draw; L = Loss; = Conference leader; = Playoffs berth; = Wild card berth

==== Match results ====
Win Draw Loss Void Postponed

=== February ===
February 22 1	LA Galaxy	1–1	New York City FC	Carson, California
7:00 p.m. EST	Klauss 2'; Garcés (yellow card) 59' (yellow-red card) 65'; Aude (yellow card) 59'	Report	Gray (yellow card) 42'; Trewin (yellow card) 56'; Fernández 66' (pen.); Parks (yellow card) 86'	Stadium: Dignity Health Sports Park; Attendance: 25,025; Referee: Victor Rivas

=== March ===
March 1 2	Philadelphia Union	1–2	New York City FC	Chester, Pennsylvania
4:30 p.m. EST	Makhanya (yellow card) 23' (yellow-red card) 90+2'; Vassilev 89' (pen.); Sery Larsen (yellow card) 90+5'	Report	Gray (yellow card) 20', (goal) 90+9'; Wolf 36'; O'Neill (yellow card) 39'	Stadium: Subaru Park; Attendance: 18,513; Referee: Chris Penso

March 7 3	New York City FC	5–0	Orlando City SC	New York, New York
2:30 p.m. EST	A. Ojeda 21'; Fernández 42'; Moralez 45+7' (pen.); Parks 49', 54'	Report	Reid-Brown (yellow card) 7'; Crépeau (red card) 16'	Stadium: Yankee Stadium; Attendance: 25,055; Referee: Guido Gonzales Jr.

March 14 4	New York City FC	3–1	Colorado Rapids	New York, New York
7:30 p.m. EDT	Fernández 22', 45', (yellow card) 31'; O'Neill (yellow card) 39'; Magno 86'	Report	Ojediran (yellow card) 8'; Yapi (yellow card) 42', (goal) 45+4'	Stadium: Yankee Stadium; Attendance: 18,079; Referee: Brandon Stevis

March 22 5	New York City FC	2–3	Inter Miami CF	New York, New York
1:00 p.m. EDT	Fernández 17'; Ojeda 59'; Moralez (yellow card) 61'	Report	Luján 4', (yellow card) 38'; Micael (yellow card) 53', (goal) 74'; Allende (yellow card) 55'; Messi 61'	Stadium: Yankee Stadium; Attendance: 45,845; Referee: Armando Villareal

=== April ===
April 4 6	New York City FC	1–1	St. Louis City SC	New York, New York
7:30 p.m. EDT	Wolf 51', (yellow card) 58'	Report	Edelman (yellow card) 43'; Orozco (yellow card) 56'; Polvara (yellow card) 61'; McSorley 90+6'	Stadium: Citi Field; Attendance: 20,867; Referee: Pierre-Luc Lauziere

April 11 7	Vancouver Whitecaps FC	2–0	New York City FC	Vancouver, British Columbia
7:30 p.m. EDT	Laborda 45'; Cubas (yellow card) 53'; Larraz (yellow card) 80'; White 87'	Report		Stadium: BC Place; Attendance: 25,460; Referee: Jair Marrufo

April 18 8	New York City FC	1–2	Charlotte FC	New York, New York
7:30 p.m. EDT	Gustavo (yellow card) 17'; Parks (yellow card) 85'; Fernández 90+3'	Report	Bronico (yellow card) 3'; Toklomati 54'; Privett (yellow card) 68'; Byrne (yellow card) 81'; Kahlina (yellow card) 83'; Vargas 90'	Stadium: Citi Field; Attendance: 20,997; Referee: Tori Penso

April 22 9	New York City FC	4–4	FC Cincinnati	New York, New York
7:30 p.m. EDT	Fernández 20', 35'; Ojeda 53'; Magno 79'	Report	Denkey 32', 65'; Flores (yellow card) 50'; Smith (yellow card) 71'; Chirila 90+2'; Anunga (yellow card) 90+6'; Evander 90+5' (pen.)	Stadium: Yankee Stadium; Attendance: 17,847; Referee: Sergii Boiko

April 25 10	CF Montréal	1–0	New York City FC	Montreal, Quebec
2:30 p.m. EDT	Owusu 18'; Piette (yellow card) 63'; Escobar (yellow card) 81'; Vera (yellow card) 84'; Longstaff (yellow card) 87'; Bugaj (yellow card) 88'	Report	Gray (yellow card) 74' (yellow-red card) 78'; Fernández (yellow card) 81'; Trewin (yellow card) 90+1'	Stadium: Saputo Stadium; Attendance: 14,015; Referee: Ramy Touchan

=== May ===
May 3 11	New York City FC	0–2	D.C. United	New York, New York
3:00 p.m. EDT	Fernández (yellow card) 80'	Report	Kurokawa (yellow card) 26'; Munteanu 29', 75' (pen.); Hefti (yellow card) 45+3'; Peglow (yellow card) 70'; Murrell (yellow card) 90+3'	Stadium: Citi Field; Attendance: 14,040; Referee: Ismail Elfath

May 10 12	New York City FC	3–0	Columbus Crew	New York, New York
4:30 p.m. EDT	Wolf 12', 16', 66'	Report	Habroune (yellow card) 63'	Stadium: Yankee Stadium; Attendance: 17,770; Referee: Rubiel Vazquez

May 13 13	Charlotte FC	0–1	New York City FC	Charlotte, North Carolina
7:00 p.m. EDT	Ojeda (yellow card) 33'; Diani (yellow card) 36'; Biel (yellow card) 38'; Zaha (yellow card) 71'; Goodwin (yellow card) 87'	Report	Fernández 8', (yellow card) 29'; Wolf (yellow card) 40'; Jones (yellow card) 84'; Gustavo (yellow card) 90+4'	Stadium: Bank of America Stadium; Attendance: 23,903; Referee: Jon Freemon

May 16 14	New York Red Bulls	1–1	New York City FC	Harrison, New Jersey
7:30 p.m. EDT	Marshall-Rutty (yellow card) 24'; Ruvalcaba 44', (yellow card) 67'; Nealis (yellow card) 82'; Parker (yellow card) 86'	Report	Gustavo (yellow card) 24'; Parks (yellow card) 49'; Perea 52'; Cavallo (yellow card) 77'	Stadium: Sports Illustrated Stadium; Attendance: 25,219; Referee: Victor Rivas

May 23 15	Nashville SC	2–1	New York City FC	Nashville, Tennessee
8:30 p.m. EDT	Palacios 23'; Woledzi 49'; Qasem (yellow card) 66'; Espinoza (yellow card) 86'	Report	Fernández 23' (pen.); Trewin (yellow card) 26'	Stadium: Geodis Park; Attendance: 25,835; Referee: Alexis Da Silva

=== July ===
July 22 16	Columbus Crew	1–2	New York City FC	Columbus, Ohio
7:30 p.m. EDT	Thiaré (yellow card) 57'; Arfsten (yellow card) 60'; Habroune (yellow card) 82'; Gazdag 90+3'	Report	Fernández 28'; Gray (yellow card) 40'; Ojeda 70'; Sands (yellow card) 90+5'	Stadium: ScottsMiracle-Gro Field; Attendance: 20,036; Referee: Lorenzo Hernandez

July 25 17	New York City FC	3–1	Chicago Fire FC	New York, New York
7:30 p.m. EDT	Fernández 10', (yellow card) 62'; Ojeda 29'; Jones 41'	Report	Waterman 21', (yellow card) 77'; D'Avilla (yellow card) 51'; Dithejane (yellow card) 80'	Stadium: Yankee Stadium; Attendance: 27,419; Referee: Ricardo Montero

July 31 18	New York City FC	1–1	Toronto FC	New York, New York
7:30 p.m. EDT	Fernández 8', (yellow card) 18'; Magno (yellow card) 11'	Report	Laryea (yellow card) 6'; Osorio (yellow card) 45+6'; Mihailovic 45+6'; Dorsch (yellow card) 56'; Gilman (yellow card) 61'	Stadium: Yankee Stadium; Attendance: 21,085; Referee: Ramy Touchan

=== August ===
August 16 19	New York City FC	2–3	Philadelphia Union	New York, New York
6:30 p.m. EDT	Traoré 4' (pen.); Luighi (yellow card) 43', (goal) 45+2' (pen.); Gray (yellow card) 79'; Jones (yellow card) 90'	Report	Harriel (yellow card) 16'; Lukić (yellow card) 44'; Jean Jacques 48'; Iloski (yellow card) 50'; Damiani 69', 75'; Wagner (yellow card) 86'	Stadium: Yankee Stadium; Attendance: 20,034; Referee: Sergii Demianchuk

August 19 20	FC Cincinnati	2–1	New York City FC	Cincinnati, Ohio
7:30 p.m. EDT	Mboma Dem 11'; Miazga (yellow card) 33'; Nwobodo (yellow card) 50'; Gidi (yellow card) 82'; Evander 90+1'	Report	Luighi 21', (yellow card) 55'; Parks (yellow card) 36'; Fernández (yellow card) 74'	Stadium: TQL Stadium; Attendance: 23,317; Referee: Fotis Bazakos

August 23 21	New England Revolution	1–1	New York City FC	Foxborough, Massachusetts
4:30 p.m. EDT	Gil (penalty missed) 27'; Turgeman 36'; Harrison (yellow card) 69'	Report	Sands 45+1'; Parks (yellow card) 61'	Stadium: Gillette Stadium; Attendance: 30,055; Referee: Guido Gonzales Jr.

August 29 22	Toronto FC	1–1	New York City FC	Toronto, Ontario
7:30 p.m. EDT	Kuscevic (yellow card) 18'; Mihailović (yellow card) 59'; Pereira (yellow card) 64'; Sallói 70'	Report	Fernández 29', (yellow card) 40'; Perea (yellow card) 54'; Shore (yellow card) 90+1'	Stadium: BMO Field; Attendance: 23,174; Referee: Malik Badawi

=== September ===
September 4 23	New York City FC	0–0	Nashville SC	New York, New York
7:30 p.m. EDT	O'Toole (yellow card) 68'; Jones (yellow card) 90'	Report	Najar (yellow card) 13'; Yazbek (yellow card) 49'; Mukhtar (yellow card) 53'; Acosta (yellow card) 90+2'	Stadium: Yankee Stadium; Attendance: 20,393; Referee: Rosendo Mendoza

September 9 24	New York City FC	1–2	New England Revolution	New York, New York
7:30 p.m. EDT	Luighi 71'	Report	Gil 12' (pen.); Yusuf (yellow card) 18'; Polster (yellow card) 31'; Gazdag 90+3'	Stadium: Citi Field; Attendance: 17,197; Referee: Allen Chapman

September 12 25	Real Salt Lake	0–2	New York City FC	Sandy, Utah
9:30 p.m. EDT	Katranis (yellow card) 64'; Rodrigues (yellow card) 69'	Report	Fernández 41'; Luighi 61'; O'Toole (yellow card) 81'; Freese (yellow card) 90+8'	Stadium: America First Field; Attendance: 20,293; Referee: Abdou Ndiaye

September 18 26	New York City FC	0–1	New York Red Bulls	New York, New York
7:30 p.m. EDT	Cavallo (yellow card) 30'; O'Neill (yellow card) 55'	Report	Mehmeti (yellow card) 6'; Cowell (yellow card) 22'; Sofo (yellow card) 40'; Hall 57'	Stadium: Yankee Stadium; Attendance: 29,270; Referee: Jon Freemon

September 26 27	Atlanta United FC	2–2	New York City FC	Atlanta, Georgia
7:30 p.m. EDT	Galoppo 10'; Brennan (yellow card) 43'; Fortune 74'	Report	Edwards 5' (o.g.); Perea 56'; Gustavo (yellow card) 90+5'	Stadium: Mercedes-Benz Stadium; Attendance: 37,478; Referee: Alexis Da Silva

=== October ===
October 10 28	Chicago Fire FC	2–1	New York City FC	Chicago, Illinois
2:30 p.m. EDT	D'Avilla (yellow card) 20' (red card) 43'; Salétros 55'; Mbokazi (yellow card) 64'; Haile-Selassie 87'; Pineda (yellow card) 90+4'	Report	Wolf 19'	Stadium: Soldier Field; Attendance: 31,893; Referee: Brandon Stevis

October 14 29	Inter Miami CF	2–0	New York City FC	Miami, Florida
7:30 p.m. EDT	Berterame 20'; De Paul 45+5'; Galarza (yellow card) 52'; Riquelme (yellow card) 85'	Report	Fernández (penalty missed) 90+7'	Stadium: Nu Stadium; Attendance: 25,773; Referee: Lorenzo Hernandez

October 17 30	New York City FC	1–1	Los Angeles FC	New York, New York
7:30 p.m. EDT	Wolf (yellow card) 28'; O'Neill (yellow card) 44'; Ojeda (yellow card) 54'; Perea 59'	Report	Walta 45+1'	Stadium: Citi Field; Attendance: 23,873; Referee: Rosendo Mendoza
Note: Match originally scheduled for May 6 was rescheduled due to Los Angeles FC's participation in the 2026 CONCACAF Champions Cup.

October 24 31	Orlando City SC	2–2	New York City FC	Orlando, Florida
7:30 p.m. EDT	Griezmann 32'; Nogueira (yellow card) 38'; Ojeda 49'; Teodoro (yellow card) 63'; Cartagena (yellow card) 78'; Atuesta (yellow card) 86'	Report	Martínez 18'; Sands (yellow card) 44'; Shore 90+10'	Stadium: Inter.co Stadium; Attendance: 21,151; Referee: Elijio Arreguin

October 28 32	New York City FC	2–1	Atlanta United FC	New York, New York
7:30 p.m. EDT	Gray (yellow card) 7'; Talles Magno (yellow card) 43'; Fernández 70'; Traoré 90+5'	Report	Amaro (yellow card) 11'; Díaz (yellow card) 34'; Muyumba (yellow card) 68'; Edwards (yellow card) 81'; Embolo 88'	Stadium: Citi Field; Referee: Tori Penso

October 31 33	New York City FC	1–1	CF Montréal	New York, New York
2:00 p.m. EDT	O'Toole (yellow card) 23'; Perea 41'; Shore (yellow card) 52'; Talles Magno (yellow card) 56'	Report	Sánchez (yellow card) 29'; Pereira (yellow card) 38'; Escobar (yellow card) 47'; Radojević (yellow card) 73'; Herbers (yellow card) 90'; Ríos 90+1'	Stadium: Yankee Stadium; Attendance: 17,522; Referee: Timothy Ford

=== November ===
November 7 34	D.C. United	0–1	New York City FC	Washington, D.C.
4:00 p.m. EST	Servania (yellow card) 14'	Report	Talles Magno (yellow card) 24', (goal) 87'; Raul Gustavo (yellow card) 28'	Stadium: Audi Field; Attendance: 19,215; Referee: Matthew Thompson

=== U.S. Open Cup ===
April 14 Round of 32	Westchester SC (New York (state))	2–5	(New York (state)) New York City FC	Mount Vernon, New York
7:30 p.m. EDT	Burko 22'; McGlynn (yellow card) 61'; Evans 73'	Report	Ojeda 13'; Magno 24' (pen.), 37', 70'; Farnós 41'; Jones (yellow card) 86'	Stadium: The Stadium at Memorial Field; Attendance: 5,145; Referee: Muhammad Hassan

April 29 Round of 16	New York Red Bulls (New Jersey)	1–3	(New York (state)) New York City FC	Harrison, New Jersey
7:00 p.m. EDT	Hall 14'; Sofo (yellow card) 86'	Report	Trewin 9'; Raul 39'; Martins 57'; Fernández (yellow card) 90+2'	Stadium: Sports Illustrated Stadium; Attendance: 9,000; Referee: Chris Penso

May 20 Quarterfinals	Columbus Crew (Ohio)	1–0	(New York (state)) New York City FC	Columbus, Ohio
7:30 p.m. EDT	Arfsten 59'	Report	Farnós (yellow card) 78'	Stadium: ScottsMiracle-Gro Field; Referee: Marcos de Oliveira

=== Leagues Cup ===
August 6	New York City FC (United States)	2–0	(Mexico) Santos Laguna	Harrison, New Jersey
7:30 p.m. EDT	Gray 50'; Cavallo 66'	Report	González (yellow card) 82'; Di Yorio (yellow card) 90'	Stadium: Sports Illustrated Stadium; Attendance: 12,275; Referee: Andrew Samuel

August 9	Cruz Azul (Mexico)	2–1	(United States) New York City FC	Harrison, New Jersey
7:30 p.m. EDT	Palavecino 35'; Piovi (yellow card) 53'; Paradela 78'	Report	Freese (yellow card) 36'; Cavallo (yellow card) 37'; Murray 45+1'; Gray (yellow card) 51'; Fernández (yellow card) 83'; Jones (yellow card) 90+5'	Stadium: Sports Illustrated Stadium; Attendance: 20,969; Referee: Jesús López

August 13	New York City FC (United States)	1–2	(Mexico) Necaxa	Harrison, New Jersey
7:30 p.m. EDT	Parks 37'; Perea (yellow card) 57'	Report	González (yellow card) 54'; Valencia 58'; Ruiz (yellow card) 66'; Ochoa (yellow card) 75'; Torres 79'; Zaleta (yellow card) 83'	Stadium: Sports Illustrated Stadium; Attendance: 11,281; Referee: Fernando Moron
