= List of New York City FC seasons =

Since its inaugural season in 2015, the American soccer club New York City FC has competed in Major League Soccer.

== Key ==
Key to competitions

- Major League Soccer (MLS) – The top-flight of soccer in the United States, established in 1996.
- U.S. Open Cup (USOC) – The premier knockout cup competition in U.S. soccer, first contested in 1914.
- CONCACAF Champions League (CCL) – The premier competition in North American soccer since 1962. It went by the name of Champions' Cup until 2008.

Key to colors and symbols

1st or W	Winners
2nd or RU	Runners-up
3rd	Third place
Last	Wooden Spoon
♦	MLS Golden Boot
	Highest average attendance
Italics	Ongoing competition

Key to league record

- Season = The year and article of the season
- Div = Division/level on pyramid
- League = League name
- Pld = Games played
- W = Games won
- L = Games lost
- D = Games drawn
- GF = Goals for
- GA = Goals against
- GD = Goal difference
- Pts = Points
- PPG = Points per game
- Conf. = Conference position
- Overall = League position

Key to cup record

- DNE = Did not enter
- DNQ = Did not qualify
- NH = Competition not held or canceled
- QR = Qualifying round
- PR = Preliminary round
- GS = Group stage
- R1 = First round
- R2 = Second round
- R3 = Third round
- R4 = Fourth round
- R5 = Fifth round
- Ro16 = Round of 16
- QF = Quarterfinals
- SF = Semifinals
- F = Final
- RU = Runners-up
- W = Winners

== Seasons ==
Season	League										Position		Playoffs	USOC	Continental / Other		Average attendance (Note: Average attendance only includes statistics from regular season matches.)	Top goalscorer(s) (Note: Top goalscorer(s) includes all goals scored in the regular season, MLS Cup Playoffs, U.S. Open Cup, MLS is Back Tournament, CONCACAF Champions League, FIFA Club World Cup, and other competitive continental matches.)	
Season	League	Pld	W	L	D	GF	GA	GD	Pts	PPG	Conf.	Overall	Playoffs	USOC	Continental / Other		Average attendance	Name(s)	Goals
2015	MLS	34	10	17	7	49	58	–9	37	1.09	8th	17th	DNQ	R4	DNE		29,016	(Spain) David Villa	18
2016	MLS	34	15	10	9	62	57	+5	54	1.59	2nd	4th	QF	R4	DNQ		27,196	(Spain) David Villa	23
2017	MLS	34	16	9	9	56	43	+13	57	1.68	2nd	2nd	QF	R4	DNQ		22,177	(Spain) David Villa	24
2018	MLS	34	16	10	8	59	45	+14	56	1.65	3rd	7th	QF	R4	DNQ		23,211	(Spain) David Villa	15
2019	MLS	34	18	6	10	63	42	+21	64	1.88	1st	2nd	QF	QF	DNQ		21,107	(Brazil) Héber	15
2020	MLS	23	12	8	3	37	25	+12	39	1.70	5th	7th	R1	NH	CONCACAF Champions League MLS is Back Tournament	QF QF	N/A	(Argentina) Valentín Castellanos (Paraguay) Jesús Medina	7
2021	MLS	34	14	11	9	56	36	+20	51	1.50	4th	8th	W	NH	Leagues Cup	QF	5,937	(Argentina) Valentín Castellanos	23
2022	MLS	34	16	11	7	57	41	+16	55	1.62	3rd	5th	SF	QF	Campeones Cup	W	17,180	(Argentina) Valentín Castellanos	13
2023	MLS	34	9	11	14	35	39	-4	41	1.21	11th	22nd	DNQ	RO32	Leagues Cup	RO32	19,816	(Brazil) Gabriel Pereira	6
2024	MLS	34	14	12	8	54	49	+5	50	1.47	6th	13th	QF	DNE	Leagues Cup	QF	21,765	(Costa Rica) Alonso Martínez	16
2025	MLS	34	17	12	5	50	44	+6	56	1.65	5th	9th	SF	RO32	Leagues Cup	GS	21,971	(Costa Rica) Alonso Martínez	17
Total		363	157	117	89	578	479	+99	560	1.54	—	—	—	—	—		—	(Spain) David Villa	80
