= Matt Freese =

American soccer player (born 1998)

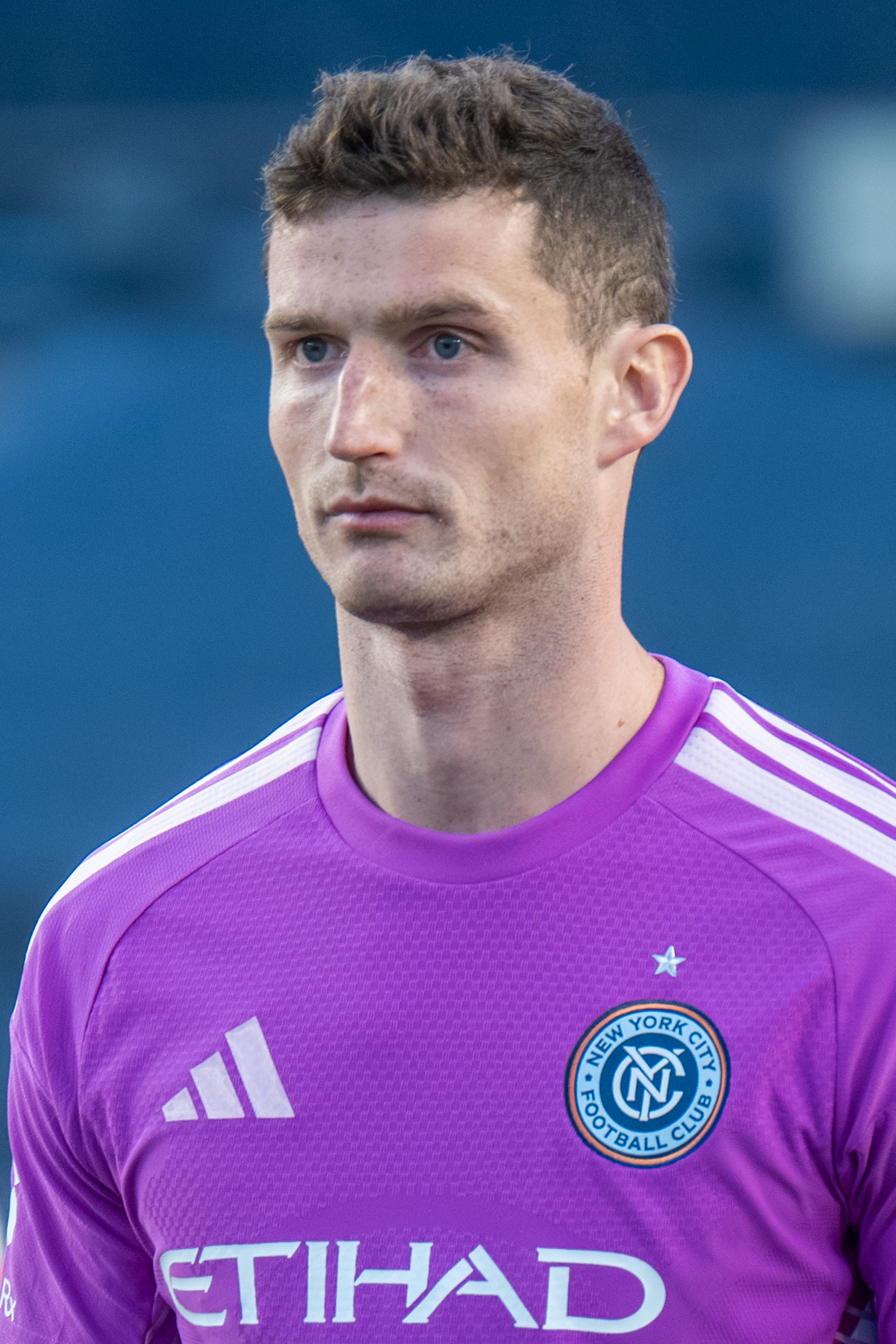
- Freese with New York City FC in 2026

Personal information
- Full name: Matthew Andrew Geary Freese
- Date of birth: September 2, 1998 (age 28)
- Place of birth: Wayne, Pennsylvania, U.S.
- Height: 6 ft 3 in (1.91 m)
- Position: Goalkeeper

Team information
- Current team: New York City FC
- Number: 49

Youth career
- 2016–2017: Philadelphia Union

College career
Years	Team	Apps	(Gls)
2017–2018	Harvard Crimson	16	(0)

Senior career*
Years	Team	Apps	(Gls)
2017	Bethlehem Steel	0	(0)
2019–2022	Philadelphia Union	13	(0)
2019–2022	Philadelphia Union II	31	(1)
2023–	New York City FC	108	(0)

International career^{‡}
2019	United States U23	1	(0)
2025–	United States	20	(0)
Medal record
Representing United States
Men's football
CONCACAF Gold Cup
Runner-up	2025 Canada–United States
- * Club domestic league appearances and goals as of November 7, 2026 ‡ National team caps and goals as of September 26, 2026

Matthew Andrew Geary Freese (born September 2, 1998) is an American professional soccer player who plays as a goalkeeper for Major League Soccer club New York City FC and the United States national team.

== Youth career ==
Born in Wayne, Pennsylvania, Freese went through the Philadelphia Union youth academy before appearing on the bench with Union reserve side, Bethlehem Steel, during the 2017 season. Not long after, Freese enrolled at Harvard, where his older brother Jack rowed heavyweight crew, and played college soccer for the Harvard Crimson. At Harvard, he found success against Ivy League opponents as a freshman and sophomore. In 2018, he led the Ivy League with an average of 6 saves per game.

== Club career ==
=== Philadelphia Union ===
On December 21, 2018, it was announced that Freese would leave Harvard early and join Major League Soccer club Philadelphia Union at the beginning of their 2019 season.

Freese made his professional debut on April 19, 2019, coming on as a 54th-minute substitute for Andre Blake in a 3–0 home win against the Montreal Impact.

On November 8, 2020, Freese made his lone start of the 2020 season against the New England Revolution on MLS Decision Day. He made one save and kept a clean sheet as the Union clinched their first trophy in club history, the Supporters' Shield.

=== New York City FC ===
On January 27, 2023, Freese was traded to New York City FC in exchange for a guaranteed $350,000 of General Allocation Money, with a possibility of an additional $400,000, as well as a percentage of a future transfer fee. On December 27, 2024, Freese was named New York City FC's MVP (Most Valuable Player) for the 2024 season after finishing third in the MLS in saves and fourth in save percentage. This marked the first time since 2021 that New York City FC gave out the award.

== International career ==
=== 2019: Youth level ===
Freese represented the United States at the U-19 and U-23 levels. Freese was named to the final 20-player United States under-23 roster for the 2020 CONCACAF Men's Olympic Qualifying Championship in March 2021.

=== 2025: Senior debut and first CONCACAF Gold Cup ===
Freese was called up to the United States national team by head coach Mauricio Pochettino ahead of the January 2025 camp in Florida with friendlies against Venezuela and Costa Rica, but did not play in either game.

Freese was again called up by Pochettino to the national team for the June 2025 training camp in Chicago ahead of matches against Turkey and Switzerland. Freese made his United States senior team debut against Turkey on June 7, 2025, where he allowed no goals and made three saves in a 90-minute performance. Freese was then included in the final 26-player roster for the 2025 CONCACAF Gold Cup, where he played in every match of the tournament. He kept two clean sheets in the group stage, and conceded a total of six goals across the competition.

=== 2026–present: First FIFA World Cup ===
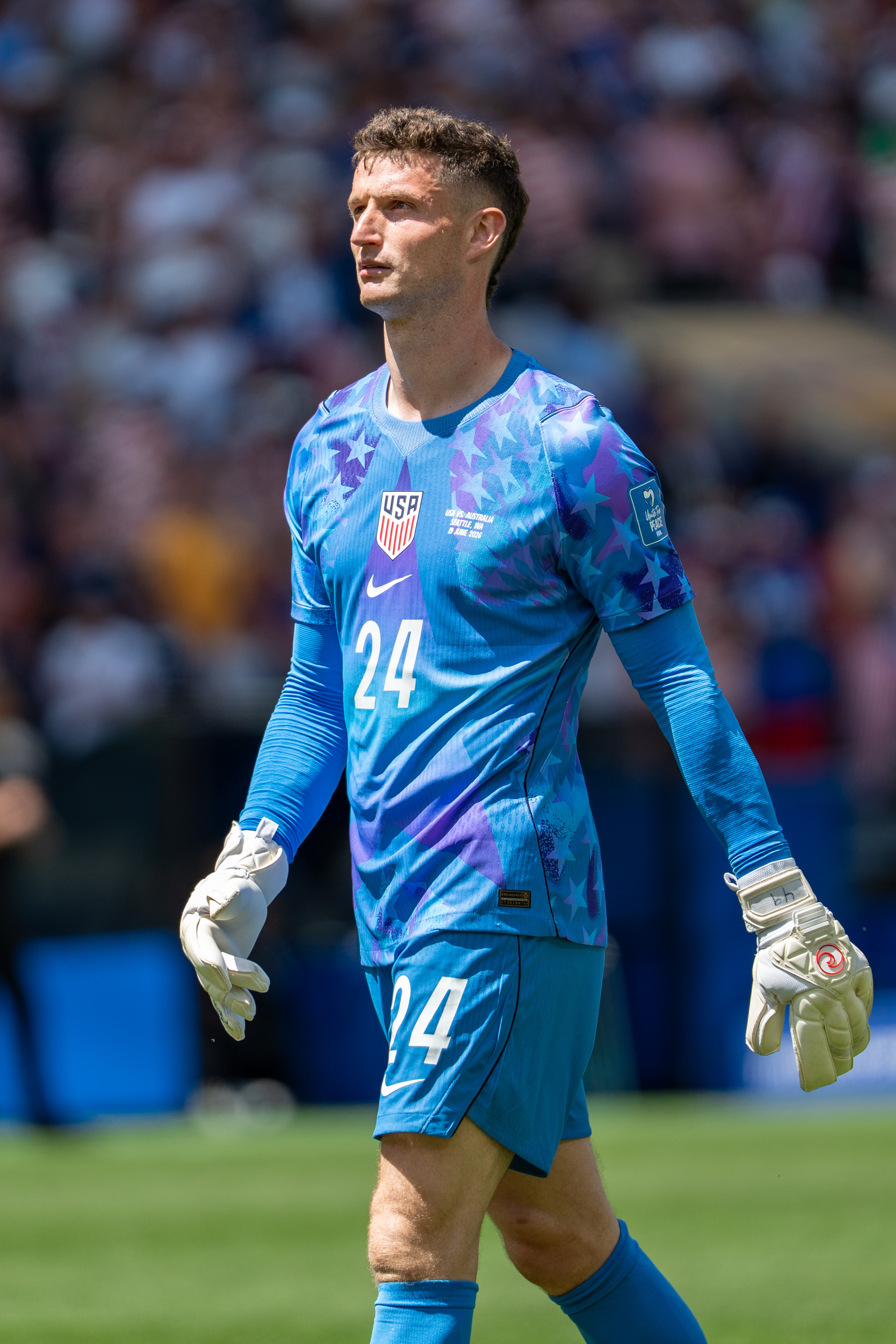
Freese with the United States at the 2026 FIFA World Cup

Freese was selected in the 26-man squad for the 2026 FIFA World Cup.

With Freese, the United States finished top of Group D, with a 4–1 win against Paraguay and a 2–0 victory over Australia (Matt Turner was the goalkeeper for the team's final game of the group stage, a 3–2 defeat to Turkey). They defeated Bosnia and Herzegovina 2–0 in the Round of 32, before being eliminated 1–4 by Belgium in the Round of 16. During the match against Belgium, Freese made a significant error, leaving his goalkeeping area and mishandling the ball, which allowed Hans Vanaken to score.

== Personal life ==
Freese is a devout Roman Catholic.

Freese's paternal grandparents, Ernst and Elisabeth Freese, were German scientists who immigrated to the U.S. after World War II and worked for the National Institutes of Health. Freese's father, Andrew Freese, was a neurosurgeon who earned a Ph.D. in neurobiology from the Massachusetts Institute of Technology.

Freese attended Episcopal Academy in Newtown Square, Pennsylvania.

After taking leave from Harvard to join the Philadelphia Union, Freese completed his course work online during the COVID pandemic and graduated from Harvard in 2022 with a degree in Economics.

Freese is currently dating Kelsey Mentzer, their relationship dates back to 2022. Mentzer is a relatively private person and mostly keeps out of the public view.

== Career statistics ==
=== Club ===
As of match played November 7, 2026

Appearances and goals by club, season and competition
Club	Season	League			National cup (Note: Includes U.S. Open Cup)		League cup (Note: Includes MLS Cup playoffs)		Continental		Other		Total	
Club	Season	Division	Apps	Goals	Apps	Goals	Apps	Goals	Apps	Goals	Apps	Goals	Apps	Goals
Bethlehem Steel	2017	United Soccer League	0	0	—		0	0	—		—		0	0
Philadelphia Union	2019	MLS	6	0	1	0	0	0	—		—		7	0
Philadelphia Union	2020	MLS	1	0	—		0	0	—		—		1	0
Philadelphia Union	2021	MLS	6	0	—		1	0	—		0	0	7	0
Philadelphia Union	2022	MLS	0	0	1	0	0	0	—		0	0	1	0
Philadelphia Union	Total		13	0	2	0	1	0	—		0	0	16	0
Philadelphia Union II	2019	USL	8	0	—		0	0	—		—		8	0
Philadelphia Union II	2020	USL	7	0	—		0	0	—		—		7	0
Philadelphia Union II	2022	MLS Next Pro	16	0	—		0	0	—		—		16	0
Philadelphia Union II	Total		31	0	—		0	0	—		0	0	31	0
New York City FC	2023	MLS	10	0	1	0	0	0	—		2 (Note: Appearances in Leagues Cup)	0	13	0
New York City FC	2024	MLS	34	0	—		4	0	—		3	0	41	0
New York City FC	2025	MLS	31	0	0	0	5	0	—		3	0	39	0
New York City FC	2026	MLS	33	0	2	0	—		—		2	0	37	0
New York City FC	Total		108	0	3	0	9	0	—		10	0	130	0
Career total			152	0	5	0	10	0	0	0	10	0	177	0

=== International ===
As of match played September 26, 2026

Appearances and goals by national team and year
National team	Year	Apps	Goals
United States	2025	13	0
United States	2026	7	0
Total		20	0

== Honors ==
Philadelphia Union

- Supporters' Shield: 2020
- MLS Cup runner-up: 2022

Individual

- MLS All-Star: 2026
