= Kevin Pierre Jr. =

American soccer player (born 2003)

- Pierre with New York City FC in 2026

Personal information
- Full name: Kevin Gabriel Pierre Jr.
- Date of birth: June 21, 2003 (age 23)
- Place of birth: Okinawa, Japan
- Height: 6 ft 1 in (1.85 m)
- Position: Midfielder

Team information
- Current team: New York City FC
- Number: 15

Youth career
- San Diego Surf

College career
Years	Team	Apps	(Gls)
2021–2023	Lander Bearcats	17	(0)
2023–2025	Georgia Southern Eagles	52	(4)

Senior career*
Years	Team	Apps	(Gls)
2025	Dothan United	4	(0)
2026–	New York City FC	2	(0)
2026–	New York City FC II	15	(1)
- * Club domestic league appearances and goals as of October 18, 2026

Kevin Gabriel Pierre Jr. (born June 21, 2003) is an American professional soccer player who plays as a midfielder for Major League Soccer club New York City FC.

== Club career ==
In April 2, 2025, he played with Dothan United in USL League Two.

At the 2026 MLS SuperDraft, Jones was selected in the first round (57th overall) by New York City FC. In February 2026, he signed a one-year contract with the club, with club options for 2026 and 2027.

== International career ==
Pierre Jr. is eligible to play for Japan through birth along with the United States and the Trinidad and Tobago through parentage.

== Career statistics ==
=== Club ===
As of match played 31 October 2026

Appearances and goals by club, season and competition
Club	Season	League			National cup (Note: Includes U.S. Open Cup)		Continental		Other		Total	
Club	Season	League	Apps	Goals	Apps	Goals	Apps	Goals	Apps	Goals	Apps	Goals
Dothan United	2025	USL League Two	4	0	–		–		–		4	0
Dothan United	Total		4	0	–		—		—		4	0
New York City FC	2026	Major League Soccer	2	0	1	0	–		–		7	0
New York City FC	Total		2	0	1	0	—		—		7	0
New York City FC II	2026	MLS Next Pro	15	1	–		–		–		15	1
New York City FC II	Total		17	1	1	0	–		—		15	1
Career total			21	1	1	0	–		–		22	1
