= Kai Trewin =

Australian soccer player (born 2001)

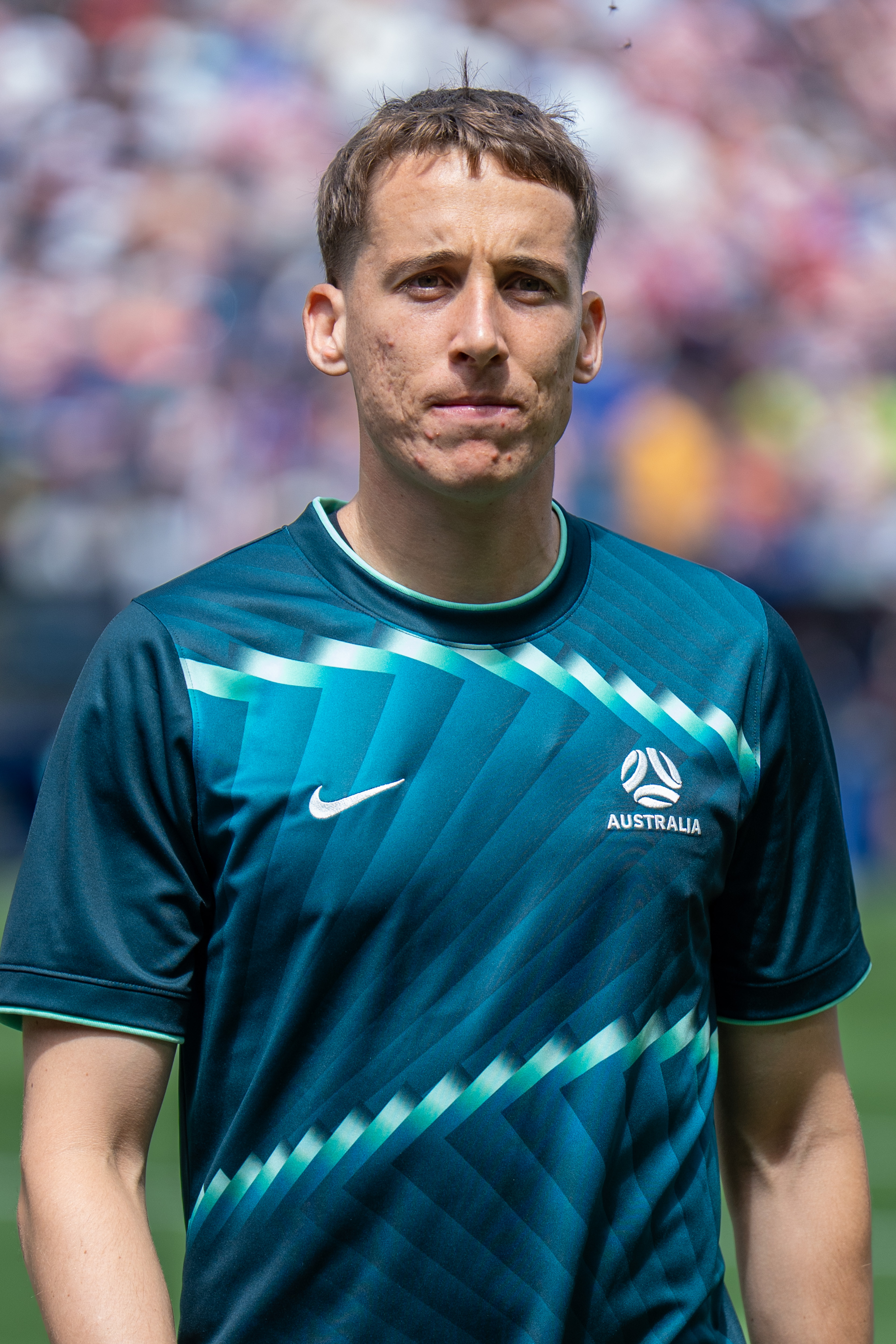
- Trewin with Australia in 2026

Personal information
- Full name: Kai Clifton Trewin
- Date of birth: 18 May 2001 (age 25)
- Place of birth: Batemans Bay, New South Wales, Australia
- Height: 1.83 m (6 ft 0 in)
- Position: Central defender

Team information
- Current team: New York City FC
- Number: 5

Youth career
- Gungahlin United
- 2018–2020: Brisbane Roar

Senior career*
Years	Team	Apps	(Gls)
2016–2017	FFA CoE	31	(4)
2018–2020	Brisbane Roar NPL	27	(2)
2020–2024	Brisbane Roar	105	(1)
2024–2026	Melbourne City	28	(3)
2026–	New York City FC	12	(0)

International career^{‡}
2019–2020	Australia U20	8	(2)
2022–2024	Australia U23	7	(0)
2025–	Australia	7	(0)
Medal record
Men's football
Representing Australia
AFF U-19 Youth Championship
First place	Vietnam 2019	Team
AFF U-16 Youth Championship
First place	Cambodia 2016	Team
- * Club domestic league appearances and goals as of 31 May 2025 ‡ National team caps and goals as of 3 July 2026

Kai Clifton Trewin (/ˈtruːɪn/; born 18 May 2001) is an Australian professional soccer player who plays as a central defender for Major League Soccer club New York City FC and the Australia national team.

== Club career ==
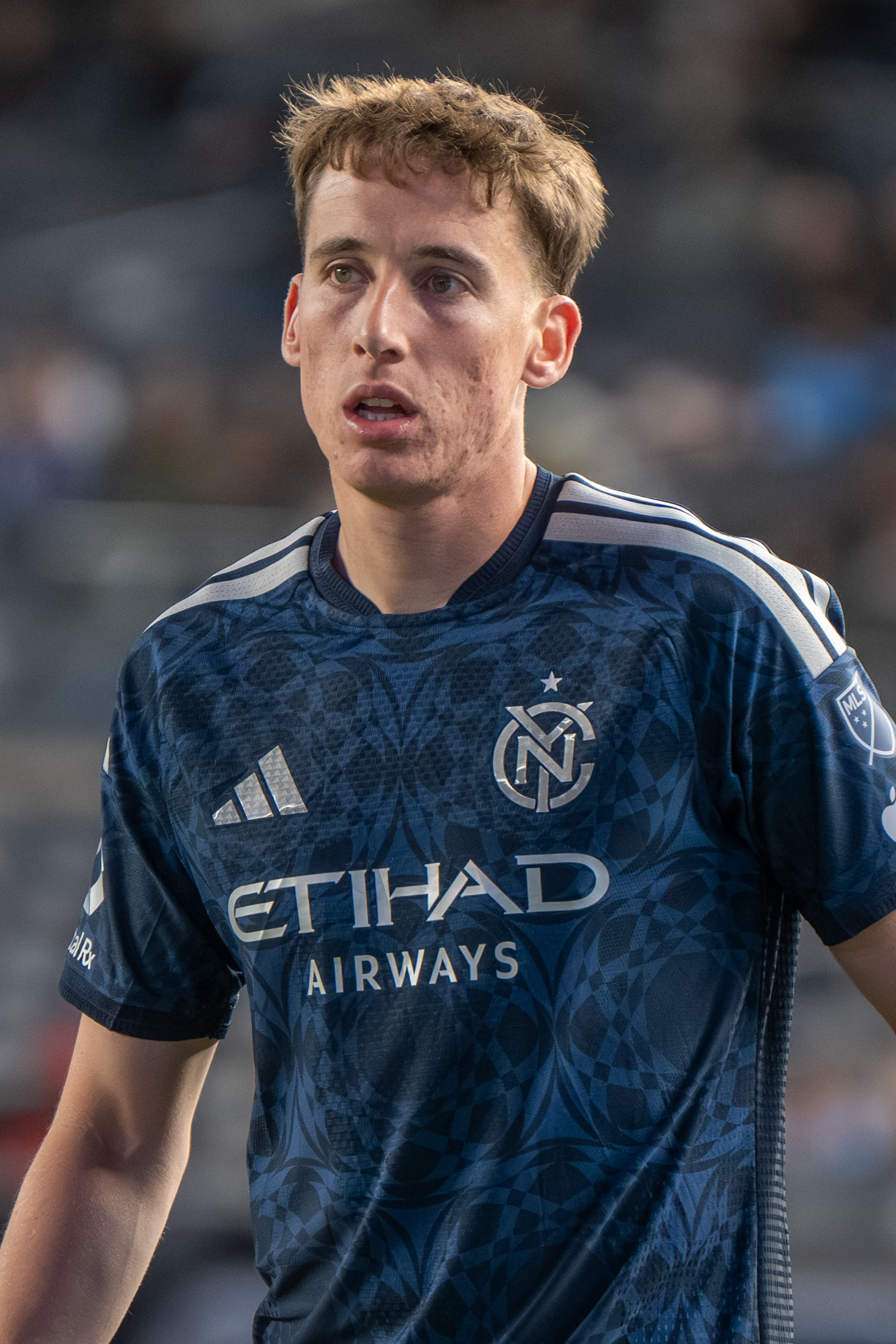
Trewin with New York City FC in 2026

On 6 March 2020, Trewin made his professional debut for Brisbane Roar in a league match against Western Sydney Wanderers, replacing Scott McDonald in the 92nd minute as the Roar won 3–1.

On 17 May 2024, it was announced that Trewin would join fellow A-League Men club Melbourne City on a permanent deal on 1 July, signing a three-year contract.

On 28 January 2026, New York City FC announced that Trewin had been acquired from fellow City Football Group club Melbourne City FC for an undisclosed fee, signing a contract through the 2028–29 season, with an option for the 2029–30 season.

== International career ==
On 31 May 2026, Trewin was selected in Australia senior national team's 26-man squad for the 2026 FIFA World Cup.

== Career statistics ==
As of match played on 10 February 2024

Club statistics
Club	Season	League			National Cup		Other		Total	
Club	Season	Division	Apps	Goals	Apps	Goals	Apps	Goals	Apps	Goals
Brisbane Roar	2019–20	A-League	2	0	0	0	1 (Note: Appearance in the 2019–20 A-League Final Series)	0	3	0
Brisbane Roar	2020–21	A-League	24	0	0	0	1 (Note: Appearance in the 2020–21 A-League Final Series)	0	25	0
Brisbane Roar	2021–22	A-League	25	0	3	0	—		28	0
Brisbane Roar	2022–23	A-League	26	0	4	0	—		30	0
Brisbane Roar	2023–24	A-League	26	1	3	0	—		29	1
Brisbane Roar	Total		103	1	10	0	2	0	115	1
Melbourne City FC	2024-2025	A-League	24	3	1	0	3	0	28	3
Melbourne City FC	2025-2026	A-League	13	0	0	0	6	0	19	0
Melbourne City FC	Total		37	3	1	0	9	0	47	3
New York City FC	2026	MLS	15	0	3	1	0	0	18	1
Career totals			145	4	14	1	11	0	180	5

== International career ==
Trewin has represented Australia at various youth levels.

== Honours ==
Melbourne City

- A-League: 2024–25

Brisbane Roar

- Y-League: 2018–19

Australia U20

- AFF U-19 Youth Championship: 2019

Australia U17

- AFF U-16 Youth Championship: 2016

Individual

- A-Leagues All Stars: 2024
