= Jonathan Shore =

American soccer player (born 2007)

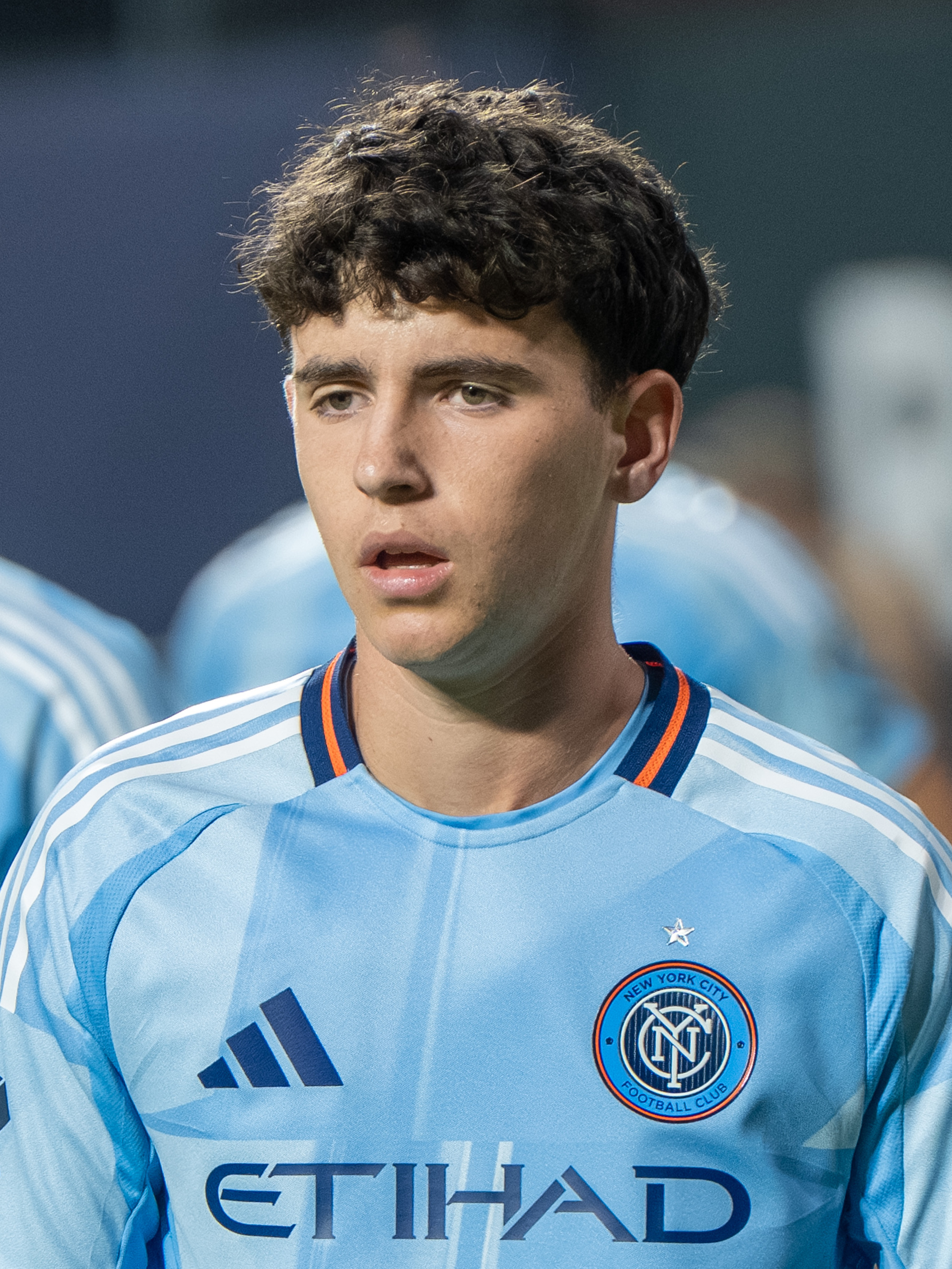
- Shore with New York City FC in 2025

Personal information
- Date of birth: April 13, 2007 (age 19)
- Place of birth: New York City, New York, US
- Height: 5 ft 8 in (1.73 m)
- Position: Midfielder

Team information
- Current team: New York City FC
- Number: 32

Youth career
- 2017–2023: New York City FC

Senior career*
Years	Team	Apps	(Gls)
2023–2026	New York City FC II	40	(11)
2024–	New York City FC	43	(1)

International career^{‡}
2023	United States U16	3	(0)
2024	United States U18	1	(0)
2025–	United States U19	6	(2)
- * Club domestic league appearances and goals as of 1 July 2025 ‡ National team caps and goals as of 28 March 2026

Jonathan Shore (born April 13, 2007) is an American professional soccer player who plays as a midfielder for Major League Soccer club New York City FC.

== Early life and youth career ==
Born and raised in New York City, Shore joined the New York City FC Academy in 2017 at age ten, having previously played for the Manhattan Kickers.

== Club career ==
=== NYCFC II ===
In March 2023, at age 15, Shore signed a Homegrown Player contract with NYCFC, becoming the club’s eleventh Homegrown signing, and made two appearances for NYCFC II in MLS Next Pro that season.

=== New York City FC ===
Shore debuted for the first team in MLS on February 22, 2025, coming on at halftime in a 2–2 draw against Inter Miami.

== International career ==
Born in the United States and of Mexican heritage, Shore is eligible to represent either the United States or Mexico. Shore has been involved with the United States youth national teams at U15, U16, U18 & U19 levels.

== Recognition ==
In 2023, he was named to the MLS Next All‑Star roster.

== Style of play ==
Shore has been described by NYCFC Sporting Director David Lee as "an intelligent, creative and dynamic central midfield player".

== Career statistics ==
As of Matches played 19 August 2026

Club	Season	Division	League		National cup		Playoffs		Continental		Other		Total	
Club	Season	Division	Apps	Goals	Apps	Goals	Apps	Goals	Apps	Goals	Apps	Goals	Apps	Goals
New York City FC II	2022	MLS Next Pro	2	0	—		—		—		—		2	0
New York City FC II	2023	MLS Next Pro	15	2	—		—		—		—		15	2
New York City FC II	2024	MLS Next Pro	20	8	3	0	1	0	—		—		24	8
New York City FC II	2026	MLS Next Pro	3	1	—		—		—		—		3	1
New York City FC II	Totals		40	11	3	0	1	0	0	0	0	0	44	11
New York City FC	2025	MLS	28	1	1	0	2	0	—		2 (Note: Appearances in Leagues Cup)	0	33	1
New York City FC	2026	MLS	15	0	2	0	—		—		3 (Note: Appearances in Leagues Cup)	0	20	0
New York City FC	Totals		43	1	3	0	2	0	0	0	5	0	53	1
Career Totals			83	12	6	0	3	0	0	0	5	0	97	12
