= New York City FC =

American professional soccer club based in New York City

- Full name: New York City Football Club
- Nicknames: The Pigeons; The Boys in Blue
- Short name: NYCFC
- Founded: May 21, 2013; 13 years ago
- Stadium: Yankee Stadium; The Bronx, New York; Citi Field; Queens, New York
- Capacity: Yankee Stadium: 28,743 (expandable to 47,422); Citi Field: 41,922
- Owners: City Football Group (80%); Marcelo Claure (10%); Yankee Global Enterprises (10%)
- Sporting director: Todd Dunivant
- Coach: vacant
- League: Major League Soccer
- 2026: Eastern Conference: 11th Overall: 23rd Playoffs: Did not qualify
- Website: newyorkcityfc.com
Home colors	Away colors

Clubs owned by CFG Listed in order of acquisition/foundation. Bold indicates the club was founded by CFG. * indicates the club was acquired by CFG. § indicates the club is co-owned. † indicates the club is no longer owned by CFG.
2008	(England) Manchester City*
2009–2012
2013	(United States) **New York City FC**^{§}
2014	(Australia) Melbourne City*
2014	(Japan) Yokohama F. Marinos*^{†}
2015–2016
2017	(Uruguay) Montevideo City*
2017	(Spain) Girona*^{§}
2018
2019	(China) Shenzhen Peng City*^{§}
2019	(India) Mumbai City^{†}
2020	(Belgium) Lommel*
2020	(France) Troyes*
2021
2022	(Italy) Palermo*^{§}
2023	(Brazil) Bahia*^{§}

New York City Football Club (often referred to as NYCFC) is an American professional football club in New York City. The club competes in Major League Soccer (MLS) as a member of the Eastern Conference. New York City FC is owned by City Football Group, a subsidiary of the Abu Dhabi United Group, with minority stakes held by Yankee Global Enterprises (owners of the New York Yankees) and investor Marcelo Claure.

New York City FC played its first league game in the 2015 MLS season, as the twentieth expansion team of the league; it is the first franchise based in the city, and the second in the New York metropolitan area, after the New York Red Bulls, with whom they contest the Hudson River Derby. Since 2015, the club has primarily played its home games at Yankee Stadium in the Bronx. Beginning in the 2022 season, NYCFC has played at least six of its seventeen home matches at Citi Field in Queens, across the street from its future home, Etihad Park, which is scheduled to open in 2027. Several alternative venues have been used when Yankee Stadium and Citi Field are unavailable, including Sports Illustrated Stadium in Harrison, New Jersey.

After five years of performing well in the regular season but falling short in the playoffs, New York City FC won the 2021 MLS Cup. The club then won its first international trophy when they defeated Atlas at the 2022 Campeones Cup, becoming the first New York–based soccer club to win an international trophy.

New York City FC is the fifteenth best attended club in the league, and the fifth most valuable, worth $1 billion, based on attendance data from the 2024 regular season and valuations by Sportico.

== History ==
=== Foundation ===
In early 2006, Major League Soccer had an interest in placing a second team in the New York City area, following the expiry of MetroStars' exclusive territorial rights as a condition of the creation of New York Red Bulls. By 2007, the league had held talks with several groups, including New York Mets owner Fred Wilpon and his family, about owning the second New York franchise. The Wilpons' interest in MLS reportedly faded following the family's losses in the Madoff investment scandal, but the league continued to look for investors.

In 2010, MLS commissioner Don Garber officially announced the league's intent to make its 20th franchise a second team in the New York area. At that point, the league hoped to have the new team beginning operations by 2013. Garber held discussions with the owners of the rebooted New York Cosmos, but they balked at the league's expansion fee and single-entity structure and decided not to apply for entry, instead joining the second-tier North American Soccer League.

In 2012, following a failed bid for a Miami expansion team led by Barcelona Garber reached out to Ferran Soriano, Barcelona's vice president at the time of the Miami bid, who had since been Manchester City CEO. In December 2012, unnamed sources told the media that Manchester City were close to being announced as the new owners of the 20th team of MLS, and the brand name "New York City Football Club" was trademarked, although the club quickly denied the report.

Manchester City, in association with the New York Yankees baseball team, paid the $100 million expansion fee to join the league. New York City Football Club, LLC was also registered with the New York State Department on May 7, 2013, and on May 21, the team was officially announced as the 20th Major League Soccer franchise.

On May 22, 2013, the club named former United States and Manchester City midfielder Claudio Reyna as its director of football operations, responsible for coaching staff and player recruitment ahead of the team's inaugural MLS season in 2015. Reyna, a New Jersey native, also played for the nearby New York Red Bulls. The team announced an English-language radio deal with WFAN on October 3, 2013.

On December 11, 2013, Jason Kreis was announced as the first head coach of the new franchise, after declining to extend his contract at Real Salt Lake. The move came just four days after his squad's second-place finish in the 2013 MLS Cup, losing on penalties to Sporting Kansas City. Kreis's tenure began with a trip to Manchester, England, to familiarize himself with the set-up of the franchise owners. Kreis' official unveiling was made at a press conference on January 10, 2014, where he made it public that his former assistant Miles Joseph had joined him at the club.

On June 2, 2014, the club announced that Spanish World Cup-winning striker David Villa had signed as the first player. While the team awaited the start of the 2015 MLS season, Villa was loaned to Melbourne City, a club also owned by City Football Group, and was called back after only four matches. On July 24, 2014, New York City announced at a live press conference in Brooklyn that ex-England international and Chelsea all-time top goal scorer Frank Lampard would be joining them as their second Designated Player. On July 6, 2015, the club also signed ex-Italian international Andrea Pirlo from Juventus as their third Designated Player.

In the 2015 MLS SuperDraft, as an expansion team, New York City had the second overall pick, choosing Oregon State forward Khiry Shelton as their first pick.

=== 2015–2020: Inaugural season and initial MLS Playoffs failure ===
An up-and-down pre-season saw the new squad dominate their first exhibition match, played against Scotland's St Mirren, with Villa scoring the club's first goal in a regulated match, while in the Carolina Challenge Cup, they finished second out of four teams after a slow start ruled out their chances of picking up the non-competitive silverware. Their first league game was played on March 8 against fellow expansion side Orlando City SC, with Mix Diskerud scoring their first competitive goal in a game which finished 1–1 in front of a packed Citrus Bowl stadium. A week later in their first home game, Villa and Patrick Mullins scored in their first home win against New England Revolution in front of a crowd of 43,507. The team eventually suffered an eleven-game winless streak which ended on June 16, after defeating the Philadelphia Union 2–1.

New York City faced the New York Cosmos in the fourth round of the 2015 Lamar Hunt U.S. Open Cup, and were eliminated on penalties. The team finished 8th in the Eastern Conference, and 17th overall. After the season ended, Kreis was relieved from his head coaching duties on November 2. The team's failure to make the playoffs and the team's second lowest points in the league, were the main factors in his release. A week later, Patrick Vieira was announced as the new head coach of the team.

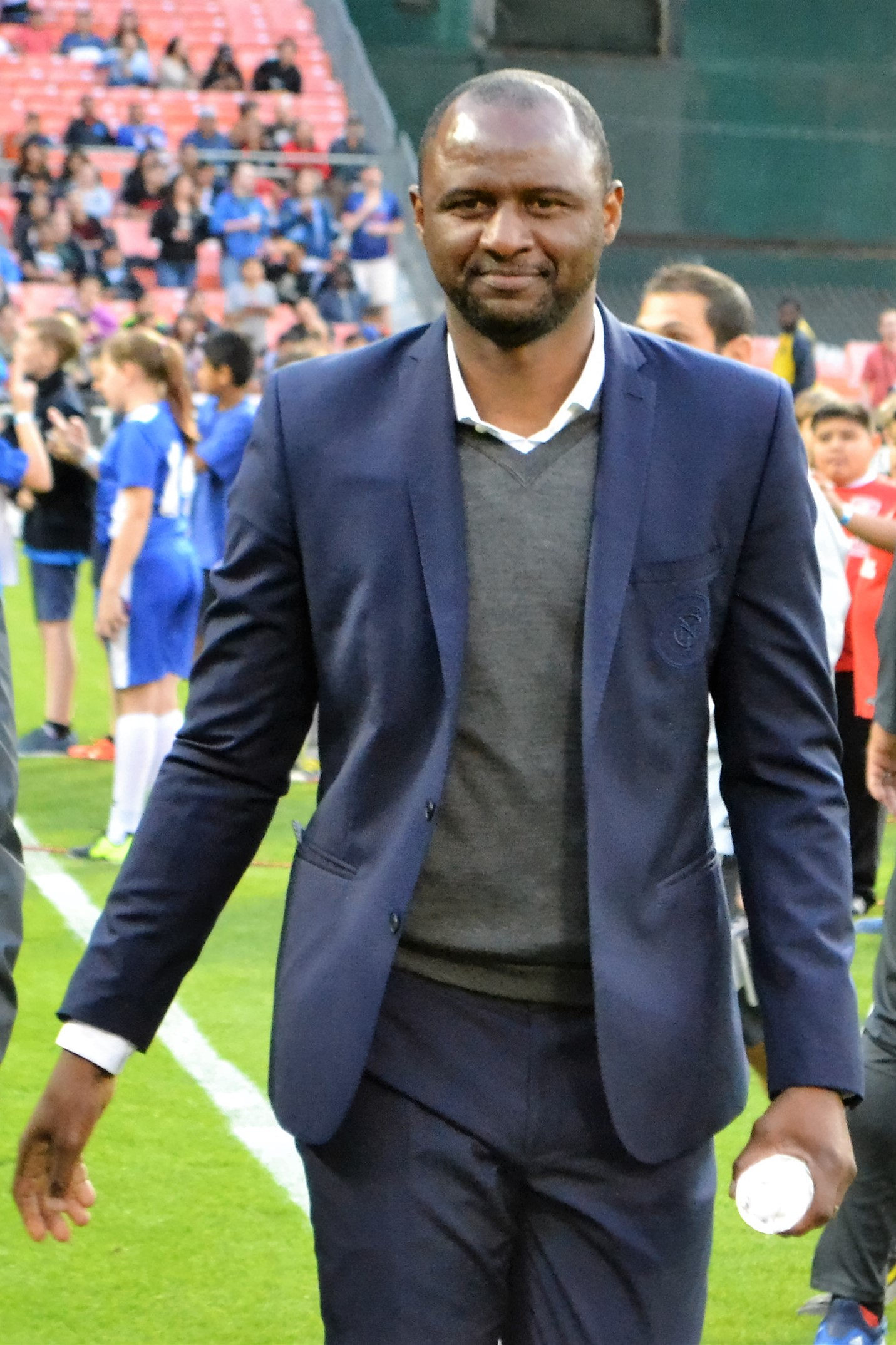
Patrick Vieira was the second head coach

Under Vieira's stewardship, the club had a remarkable season in 2016. The squad adopted a free-flowing, attacking, press-based system, which gained both the team and coach several plaudits from experts, players, and fellow coaches. The club began pre-season trading for Jack Harrison, the first overall pick in the 2016 MLS SuperDraft. Harrison made an immediate impact and became a core squad component in his first year with the team, creating a formidable partnership with Villa. Villa also regained his striking form, and eventually became the 2016 league MVP after scoring 23 goals. New York City qualified for the playoffs for the first time in franchise history, eventually losing to Toronto in a two-game series in the Eastern Conference semi-finals. Following the season's conclusion, the club parted ways with Lampard, who had become injury prone during his time with the club.

The 2017 season saw similar success, with the club replacing the departing Lampard with Argentine midfielder Maximiliano Moralez as their new third Designated Player, while Alexander Ring joined from Kaiserslautern. The club were runners-up for the 2017 Supporters' Shield, finishing the regular season with a record of 16–9–9, as well as a record 57 point total. They were once again eliminated from the playoffs in the conference semi-finals, losing to the fifth-seed Columbus Crew by a 4–3 goal aggregate.

New York City utilized the following off-season to aggressively overhaul the squad, with ten senior players departing. Among them was Andrea Pirlo, who announced his retirement prior to the club's final playoff game against Columbus Crew. He was replaced by Paraguayan international Jesus Medina on New Year's Eve, who became New York City's third Designated Player. The club promoted both Jonathan Lewis, the third-overall pick in the 2017 MLS SuperDraft, and James Sands, the club's first Homegrown Player to fill in for departing players. Rónald Matarrita, the 2016 Defensive Player of the Year, extended his contract to remain with the club beyond the 2018 season. The club then made its first acquisition on December 13, with the signing of defender Anton Tinnerholm, who joined from Allsvenskan champions Malmö. The club then rounded out the roster with a trio of internationals, as striker Jo Inge Berget, central defender Cédric Hountondji, and speedster Ismael Tajouri-Shradi all joined the team. Brad Stuver was also acquired in a trade with Columbus, in order to provide cover as third-choice goalkeeper. Finally, Ghanaian international Ebenezer Ofori joined on loan from Bundesliga side VfB Stuttgart, while the club selected goalkeeper Jeff Caldwell with the nineteenth overall pick in the 2018 MLS SuperDraft, as they began the season in search of an MLS Cup.

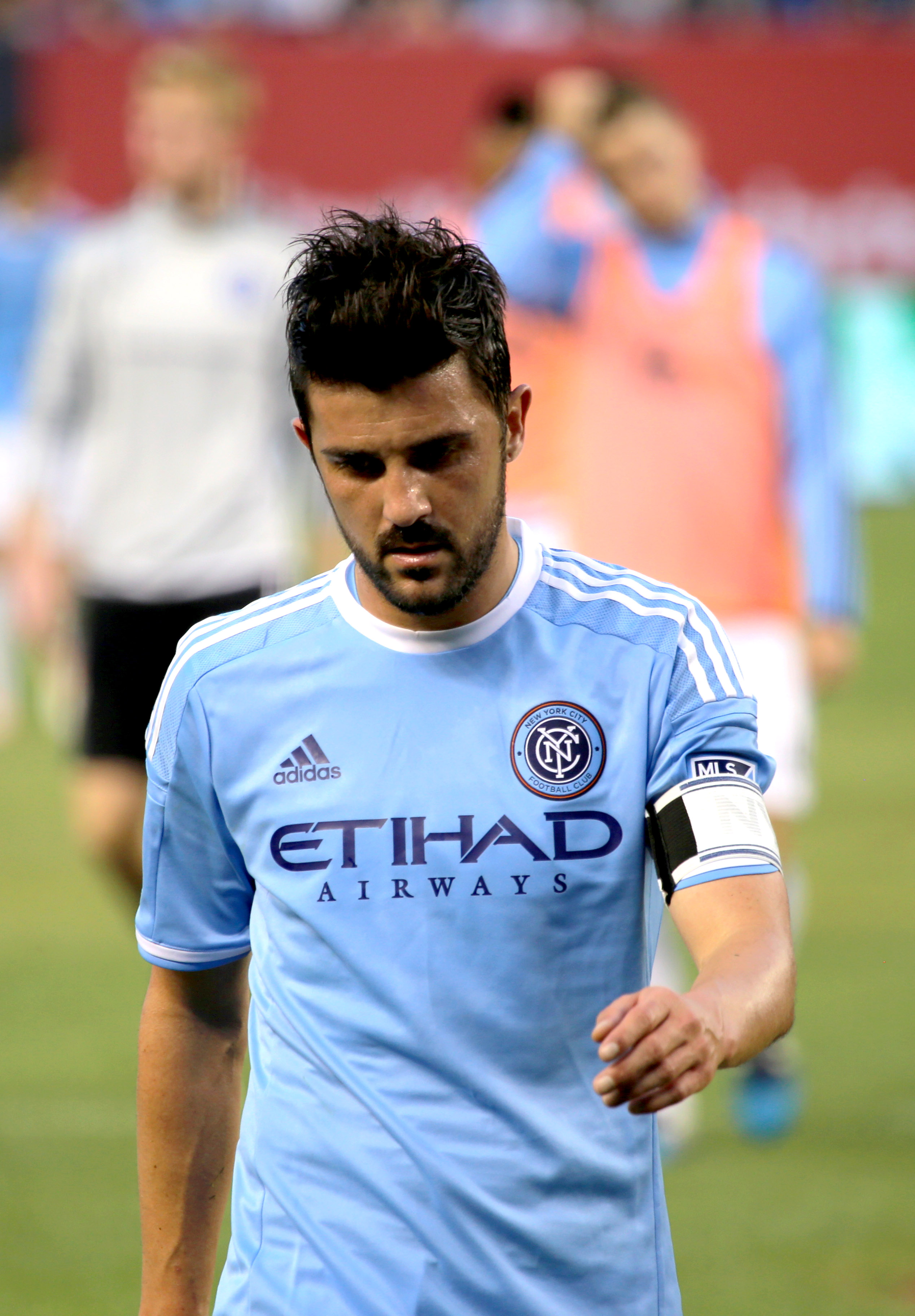
David Villa is the club's all-time top goalscorer.

Midway through the 2018 season, Vieira would depart the club to return to France, in order to coach at Ligue 1 club Nice. He departed alongside his band of assistant coaches: Christian Lattanzio, Kristian Wilson and Matt Cook. Vieira was then quickly replaced by Domènec Torrent, long-time assistant coach to Pep Guardiola. Torrent was successful in his first game, securing a 2–1 win at home against Toronto on June 24. The club added to its roster during the season, with free agent Eloi joining as Torrent's first signing, who arrived from CFG sister club Girona on July 25. The team then concluded a loan deal for youth prospect Valentín Castellanos two days later. Castellanos would score on his debut on August 4. Torrent's strong start faded during the season, only registering an additional six victories, including a period in which the club notched only one win in two months. Despite this performance, New York City eventually qualified for the playoffs as the third seed in the Eastern Conference, but were again defeated in the second round to conclude the 2018 season. Individually, Moralez shone, and was voted an All-Star for his performances.

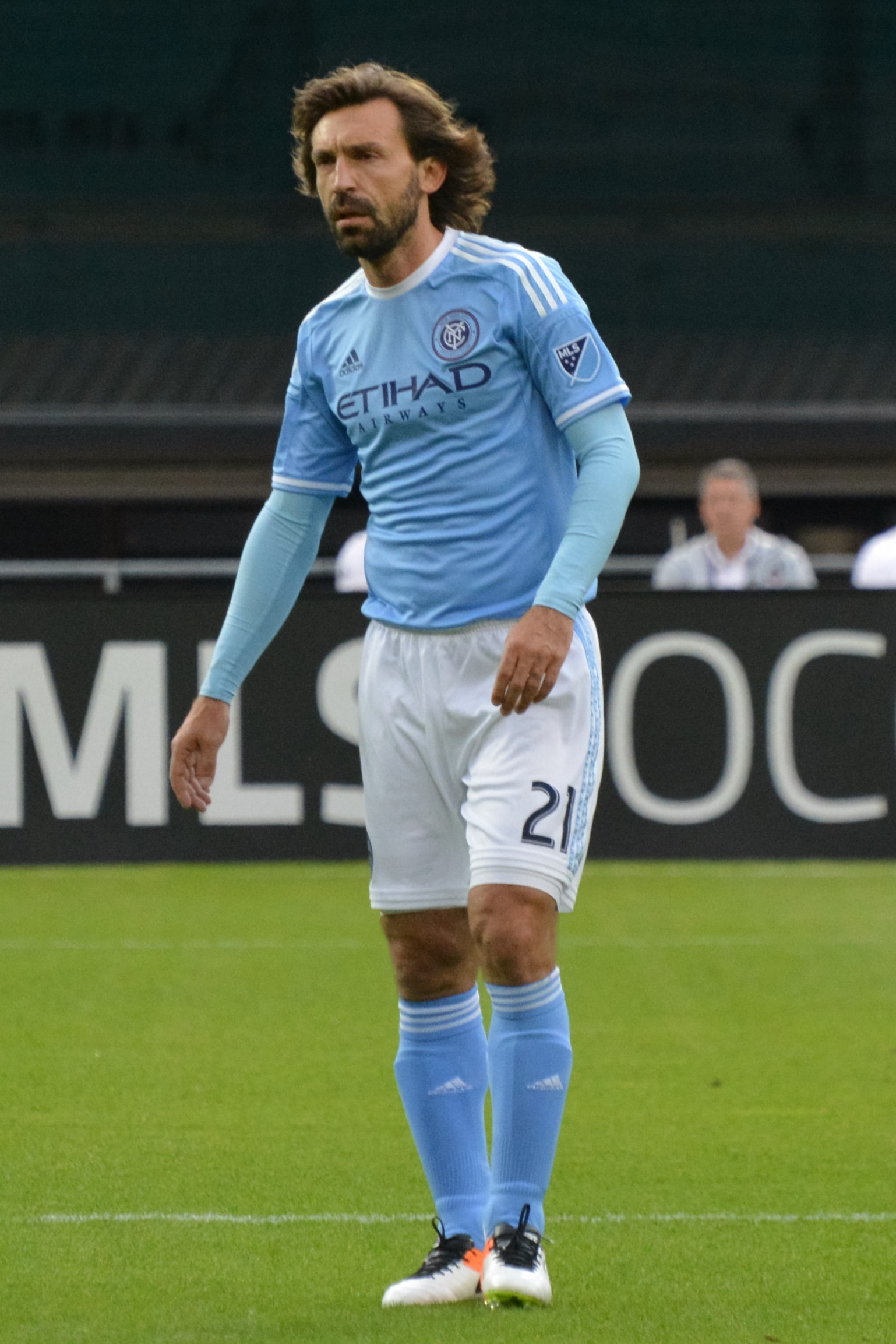
Andrea Pirlo playing for New York City in 2016

The club then underwent another period of transition in the off-season, with several players' options declined on November 29, including cult-hero Tommy McNamara, recent signings Ofori and Eloi, and first team regulars Maxime Chanot and Rodney Wallace. Berget's contract with the club was mutually terminated after just a single season. The club also parted ways with record appearance maker and goalscorer Villa—who had been voted into the MLS Best XI twice and was a four-time MLS All-Star in his four seasons with New York—who joined J-League side Vissel Kobe. Alexander Ring was named the club's second captain after Villa's departure.

An option to buy in Castellanos' loan deal was exercised, making his transfer permanent. Chanot was eventually resigned to a multi-year contract on December 8, while Ofori's loan was extended for another season. New York City made their first acquisition, Tony Rocha, just under a week later in a trade with Orlando City SC, whereby the team parted with a fourth-round pick in the 2019 MLS SuperDraft. The club later loaned in U.S. international Keaton Parks in January, who joined from Portuguese side Benfica, while Juan Pablo Torres joined from Belgian Pro League side Lokeren. Meanwhile, Justin Haak was promoted to the senior team as the club's second Homegrown Player. Hountondji was later waived in order to clear a roster spot for the club's 12th overall draft pick in the 2019 MLS SuperDraft, goalkeeper Luis Barraza. New York City then signed Romanian international Alexandru Mitriță as the club's third Designated Player on February 4, for a rumored club-record transfer fee of US$9.1 million, making him also one of the most expensive transfers in MLS history. The club later signed Brazilian forward Héber on March 21, and in June, signed Scottish forward Gary Mackay-Steven on a free transfer from Aberdeen.

Mid-season, the club traded for defender Eric Miller from Minnesota United FC on July 29, for $50,000 in general allocation money. Despite these roster changes, the team again failed in the playoffs, falling to previous MLS Cup champions Toronto, despite the club finishing atop the regular season standings in Eastern Conference for the first time. Following this, the club "mutually parted ways" with head coach Torrent. The club announced its end of season awards on November 12, with Chanot receiving Defensive Player of the Year, while Héber won Newcomer of the Year. Moralez again shone in New York for a second successive season, being voted into the 2019 MLS Best XI.

At the start of the off-season, the team oversaw a number of departures; veteran defender Ben Sweat left after being selected by upstart MLS club Inter Miami CF as their first overall pick in the 2019 MLS Expansion Draft, while Sporting Director Claudio Reyna also left the club, joining expansion side Austin. Reyna was replaced by the in-house promotion of Technical Director David Lee, who assumed the role as Sporting Director. Moreover, the club also announced Homegrown Player Joe Scally would depart to join Bundesliga club Borussia Mönchengladbach, effective January 1, 2021. The official transfer fee was undisclosed, although, multiple reports suggested the fee is to be a seven-figure sum that could rise to become one of the highest transfer fees received for a player in MLS history. Soon thereafter, Parks' loan was made permanent, while the club completed the acquisition of Gedion Zelalem on a free transfer. On January 28, 2020, New York City signed Icelandic midfielder Guðmundur Þórarinsson from Swedish club Norrköping, and the club announced the appointment of Ronny Deila as the new head coach; Deila signed a three-year contract.

New York City began the 2020 season with their debut in the CONCACAF Champions League, and advanced to the quarter finals after defeating Costa Rican outfit San Carlos 6–3 over two legs. The club then began the 2020 MLS season with a defeat, losing 1–0 away against Columbus Crew. New York City subsequently announced the signing of Uruguayan midfielder Nicolás Acevedo from Liverpool Montevideo on March 2, 2020. After the season was suspended due to the COVID-19 pandemic, New York City returned to play in July in the MLS is Back Tournament, where they placed third in Group A, progressing to the quarter-finals before falling to eventual champions Portland Timbers 3–1. They finished at the same stage of the CONCACAF Champions League, losing to Mexican side UANL. In the regular season, New York City also failed to see significant success, finishing fifth in the Eastern Conference and losing to Orlando City in the first round of the playoffs.

=== 2021: MLS Cup winners ===
In the subsequent postseason, the club sanctioned the departures of club captain Alexander Ring, leftback Ronald Matarrita, and Gary Mackay-Steven, while former club record transfer Alexandru Mitriță left on loan. The club signed Malte Amundsen in 2021, their first signing of the decade, for a reported fee of $1.6 million, on February 12. The club later completed several additions by June: they drafted Andres Jasson and Vuk Latinovich, signed goalkeeper Cody Mizell, re-signed Zelalem and brought Chris Gloster back to MLS, signed eventual first-team regular Alfredo Morales, and the Brazilian pair Thiago Andrade and Talles Magno; they also loaned Uruguayan midfielder Santiago Rodríguez. Meanwhile, reserve goalkeepers Stuver and Mason Stajduhar departed.

After a start to the season that saw the club slightly struggle while playing multiple home games at Red Bull Arena in New Jersey, the team was sitting in fourth place in the Eastern Conference standings at the end of August after a 2–0 win over the eventual Supporters Shield winners New England Revolution. The team struggled through September and the beginning of October, winning one game in nine and drawing three others. This included a draw and two losses to the New York Red Bulls and a five-game stretch where the club did not score a goal. As the pressure began to rise on the squad and manager, Ronny Deila, unlikely hero Guðmundur Þórarinsson broke the club's scoreless streak in the 90th minute of a 1–1 draw against Atlanta. The team went on to win the next three games and scrape a draw with 10 men against Philadelphia in the season finale, clawing their way from being temporarily out of the playoffs in mid-October into fourth place going into the playoffs. Valentín Castellanos finished the season as the MLS Golden Boot winner with 19 goals and eight assists.

New York City began the playoffs by beating Atlanta United FC 2–0 at Yankee Stadium, followed by a dramatic win in penalties in Foxboro over Supporters Shield winners New England Revolution in the Eastern Conference semi-finals. After a 2–2 draw after extra time, NYCFC beat the Revolution 5–3 in penalties after Sean Johnson saved an attempt by Adam Buska. It was the first penalty shootout win for New York City in five tries and their first MLS Playoffs win on the road. In the Eastern Conference finals, New York City defeated the Philadelphia Union in a comeback 2–1 win with a late goal in the 88th minute by Talles Magno. Philadelphia was without the services of 11 players in this match due to MLS COVID-19 Health and Safety protocols, while New York City were without star forward Valentin Castellanos due to a red card in the previous match against New England.

The club went on to face Portland Timbers in their first MLS Cup at Providence Park in Portland. After Castellanos began the scoring in the 41st minute, New York City were seconds away from their first title before a dramatic 94th-minute equalizer by Portland's Felipe Mora. After a scoreless extra time, Sean Johnson saved two Portland penalties and New York City prevailed 4–2 in the shootout. Alexander Callens blasted the final penalty into the back of the net for the club's title win. It was the first MLS championship for a team from the New York region and the first title for a New York sports franchise since the New York Giants won Super Bowl XLVI following the 2011 season. Additionally, it was the first top division soccer championship for a New York team since the New York Cosmos won the Soccer Bowl in 1982.

=== 2022–present: Campeones Cup winners and struggles for form ===
International play figured prominently in the club's 2022 season, which began with a run in the 2022 CONCACAF Champions League, ending in the semifinals with a defeat by the Seattle Sounders. With their MLS Cup victory the prior year, New York City FC earned the right to play in the 2022 Campeones Cup in September, defeating Mexican side Atlas to win their first international trophy and becoming the first New York–based club to do so. The year also included the beginning of a long string of departures, as the championship squad lost players and staff to new opportunities. Ismael Tajouri-Shradi was chosen by the newly established Charlotte FC in the 2022 MLS Expansion Draft, but was immediately traded to Los Angeles FC. Head coach Ronny Delia also departed in June to manage Belgian Pro League side Standard Liège, and was replaced by assistant coach Nick Cushing, who gained the full-time manager's seat after an interim period. Star striker Taty Castellanos was loaned to CFG side Girona a mere six weeks into the competition. The squad saw success in both the regular and post-season, finishing 3rd in the Eastern Conference, and 5th overall, and reaching the conference finals of the MLS Cup 2022 where they were defeated by the Philadelphia Union in a rematch of the prior year's cup.

In November, the club, along with New York City mayor Eric Adams announced the construction of Etihad Park, granting the club a permanent home in the five boroughs.

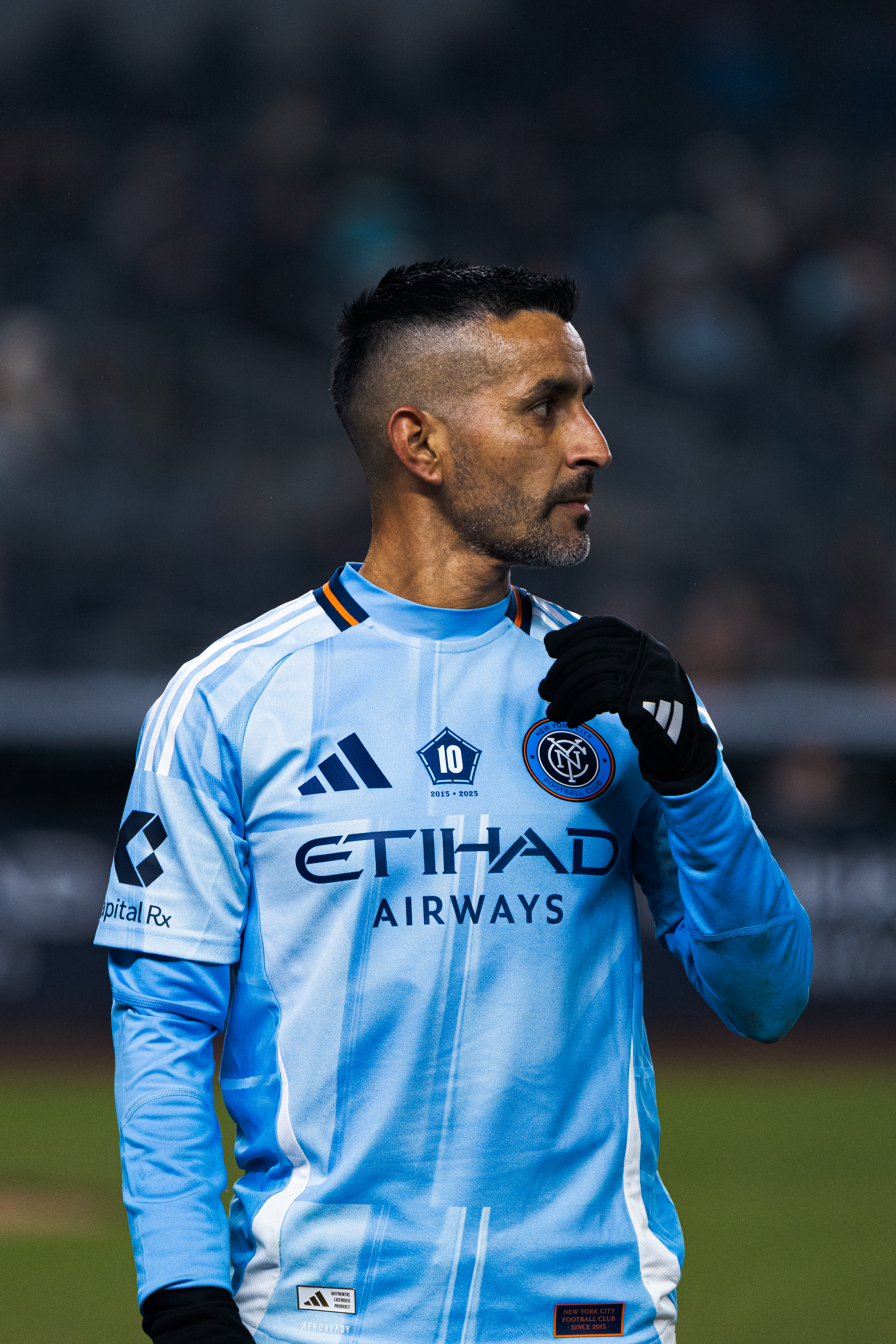
Maximiliano Moralez in 2025 playing for New York City

New York City struggled for form throughout the 2023 campaign, as continued departures crippled the club's performance, including critical members of the 2021 championship-winning squad—among them, goalkeeper Sean Johnson, defenders Anton Tinnerholm and Alexander Callens, and midfielder Maxi Moralez (who returned after a six-month stint at Racing Club). Several key new additions were made to the squad, including Santiago Rodríguez, James Sands, and Matt Freese. Despite this, the club had one of its worst statistical seasons, including a disastrous stretch that saw only 2 wins in 21 matches between April and August, across all competitions. For the first time since the club's inaugural season, the club missed the MLS Cup playoffs, finishing 11th in the conference and 22nd overall.

The 2024 season saw a return to success for the club, with significant challenges. Despite spending over $20 million on new players, including Jovan Mijatović and Agustín Ojeda, the club achieved a middling regular season result, finishing at 6th in the conference and 13th overall. That result enabled the club's returned to playoff action, defeating FC Cincinnati on penalties in the first round. That victory set up an eastern conference semifinal clash with the Red Bulls in the first ever post-season edition of the Hudson River Derby, ending in a 0–2 defeat. Three days after the season-ending loss, head coach Nick Cushing was fired and replaced by Dutch-English manager Pascal Jansen, most recently of Ferencváros.

Prior to the 2025 season, Santi Rodríguez departed the club for Botafogo for a reported $17 million fee, the second-highest in club history. A clear replacement was not found until the mid-season transfer of Nico Fernández Mercau, who joined as a designated player from Elche CF. Despite significant injuries to the squad, including mid-playoff incidents involving Andres Perea and Alonso Martinez, the club posted a good regular season result, placing 5th in the Eastern Conference. NYC knocked the 2025 Supporters' Shield-winning Philadelphia Union in the Eastern Conference semifinals, before losing in the conference finals to Inter Miami.

== Colors and badge ==
The badge used at the launch of the club.

The team did not unveil colors or a badge at its 2013 launch ceremony, instead only using a placeholder image of a blue circle with "New York City FC" in Helvetica, the font used in New York City Subway signage.

Although club chairman Ferran Soriano emphasized the desire to create a club with its own identity, rather than relying entirely on the brands of club owners Manchester City and the New York Yankees, the club consistently referred to the City sky blue and the Yankees navy. Director of Football Operations Claudio Reyna said at the press conference announcing his appointment that he was "excited to again wear City's 'Sky Blue' as part of the expansion of the MLS".

Fans voted on two finalist badges created by Rafael Esquer of Alfalfa Studio. The circular badge was unveiled as the winner on March 20, 2014.

In November 2013, Manchester City FC hired Rafael Esquer of New York-based Alfalfa Studio to create the badge and brand guidelines for New York City FC. After a week of brand immersion at Manchester City FC in the UK, Esquer produced more than 200 badge sketches, ultimately presenting his top 5 to the NYCFC and Manchester City FC client team.

On February 4, 2014, the club also launched a "Badge of Badges" campaign— inviting fans to create their own crests on a hosted badge-designer page, with every entry ultimately to be incorporated into a mosaic of the official badge after selection of its final design—and announced that after fan submissions, NYCFC would reveal two badge designs "by a hired outside partner" for fans to vote on. March 3 was originally set for the release of the two badges and the start of voting, but the date was pushed out by a week because the Yankees vetoed another finalist created by the NYCFC in-house design team for infringing their own trademark.

The two final badge options were revealed on March 10, 2014, one incorporating the shield from the city's seal, the other a circular badge inspired by the design of a subway token. Both were created by Rafael Esquer, the designer of the Made in NY mark. At that time, the club's official color scheme of navy blue, sky blue and orange was also announced. The orange is an homage to the city's Dutch origins, and is the same shade found in the city's flag. Fans were given four days to vote on the final design, and over 100,000 votes were cast. The circular design was announced as the winner on March 20, 2014, in a ceremony at the adidas store in New York, hosted by NYCFC leaders Tim Pernetti, Chief Business Officer, Claudio Reyna, Sporting Director, and Jason Kreis, Head Coach.

The shape and layout of the NYCFC badge is intended to evoke a New York City Subway token. It features the club name around the outside in Gotham, a common typeface seen around the city. The design would go on to inspire badges for most of the other clubs owned by City Football Group: Melbourne City, Manchester City, Montevideo City Torque, Mumbai City, Girona, Lommel, and Shenzhen Peng City.

The 2024 updated club badge

On March 5, 2024, the club announced what it termed a "refreshed" visual identity, in conjunction with Brooklyn-based design studio Gretel. It features a darker shade of navy and brighter shade of light blue, a new secondary color scheme, a series of soccer- and New York-themed icons, and two new custom typefaces based on 1940s subway tile signage and designed by acclaimed New York City-based type designer Tobias Frere-Jones. The badge was initially unchanged except for the team's slightly altered primary colors. At the same time, the club announced that it would be using the full name "New York City FC" and that the shortened form "NYCFC", while not eliminated, would be downplayed. The updated badge was unveiled on September 9, 2024. It incorporates one of the club's proprietary Frere-Jones' typefaces, a new "NYC" monogram designed by Frere-Jones, and a simpler, bolder configuration with fewer rings and less empty space. The new badge was rolled out across the club on January 1, 2025.

== Kits ==
New York City unveiled its inaugural jersey at an event at Terminal 5 in Hell's Kitchen on November 13, 2014. The away jersey was revealed on November 24, a black shirt with sky blue and orange trim and five reflective black stripes to represent the five boroughs of the city.

For the club's second season, a new away uniform was unveiled, featuring shirt, shorts and socks all of navy blue trimmed in orange. The shirt was dominated by lighter-blue concentric circles radiating out from the logo that "celebrate the energy of New York City". The home uniform remained virtually unchanged, with sky blue socks substituting for the white. On January 7, 2017, the club unveiled its second-ever home uniform, pairing the sky blue shirt with navy blue shorts. A small New York City flag is on the front of the shirt. The club's third away uniform was unveiled on February 7, 2018. The kit is primarily gray with sky blue details, "inspired by the concrete jungle that is the Big Apple".

=== Kit suppliers and shirt sponsors ===
Season	Kit manufacturer	Shirt sponsor	Sleeve sponsor	Ref.
2015–2021	Adidas	Etihad Airways	—	
2021	Adidas	Etihad Airways	Sol Cacao Mastercard	
2022–2023	Adidas	Etihad Airways	DUDE Wipes	
2024–present	Adidas	Etihad Airways	Judi Health (fka. Capital Rx)	

City Football Group sponsor Etihad Airways was announced as New York City's inaugural jersey sponsor at the club's first kit-reveal event at on November 13, 2014.

== Broadcasting ==
In one of the club's first announcements on October 3, 2013 – before announcing where the team would play and before any players had been signed – New York City signed an agreement with WFAN to broadcast English-language radio commentary to the New York area for club games and also serves as the flagship station of the 'New York City FC Radio Network', powered by CBS. A year later, on December 18, 2014, the club announced that it was following up its radio deal with an agreement with the YES Network to televise all home and away games. On top of the YES broadcasting rights, the deal included free streaming of all games across the internet via the Fox Sports Go website. With club co-owners the New York Yankees also part-owners of YES, the deals were of little surprise, with even Yankees president Randy Levine openly speculating on the possibility within days of the club's unveiling.

Games were broadcast on radio by WFAN and WNYM during the team's first season; the games were available via webstream for the subsequent two seasons. Broadcasts returned to terrestrial radio in 2018, as noncommercial WNYE became the team's flagship audio outlet. In 2019, Spanish-language radio station WEPN began to broadcast New York City games, with play-by-play from announcer Roberto Abramowitz and color commentary from Ariel Judas.

From 2023, every New York City match is available via MLS Season Pass on the Apple TV app.

Play-by-play	Analyst	Flagship station
Glenn Crooks	Matthew Lawrence	WNYE
Roberto Abramowitz	Ariel Judas	WEPN (Spanish Radio)

== Stadium ==
Name	Location	Years
**Yankee Stadium**	The Bronx, New York	2015–present
Coffey Field	The Bronx, New York	2016; 1 match in U.S. Open Cup
**Citi Field**	Queens, New York	2017; 1 home regular season match; 2019; 1 home match MLS playoffs; 2022–present
Belson Stadium	Queens, New York	2019; 1 match in U.S. Open Cup; 2022; 2 matches in U.S. Open Cup
Sports Illustrated Stadium	Harrison, New Jersey	2020; 5 home regular season matches; 2 home Champions Cup matches; 2021; 8 home regular season matches; 2022; 3 home regular season match; 1 home CONCACAF Champions Cup match; 2023; 1 home regular season match; 1 home Leagues Cup game; 2024; 2 home regular season match; 1 home Leagues Cup match; 2025; 2 home Leagues Cup match
Pratt & Whitney Stadium at Rentschler Field	East Hartford, Connecticut	2017; 1 home regular season match 2022; 1 home CONCACAF Champions Cup match
BMO Stadium	Los Angeles, California	2022; 1 home CONCACAF Champions League match

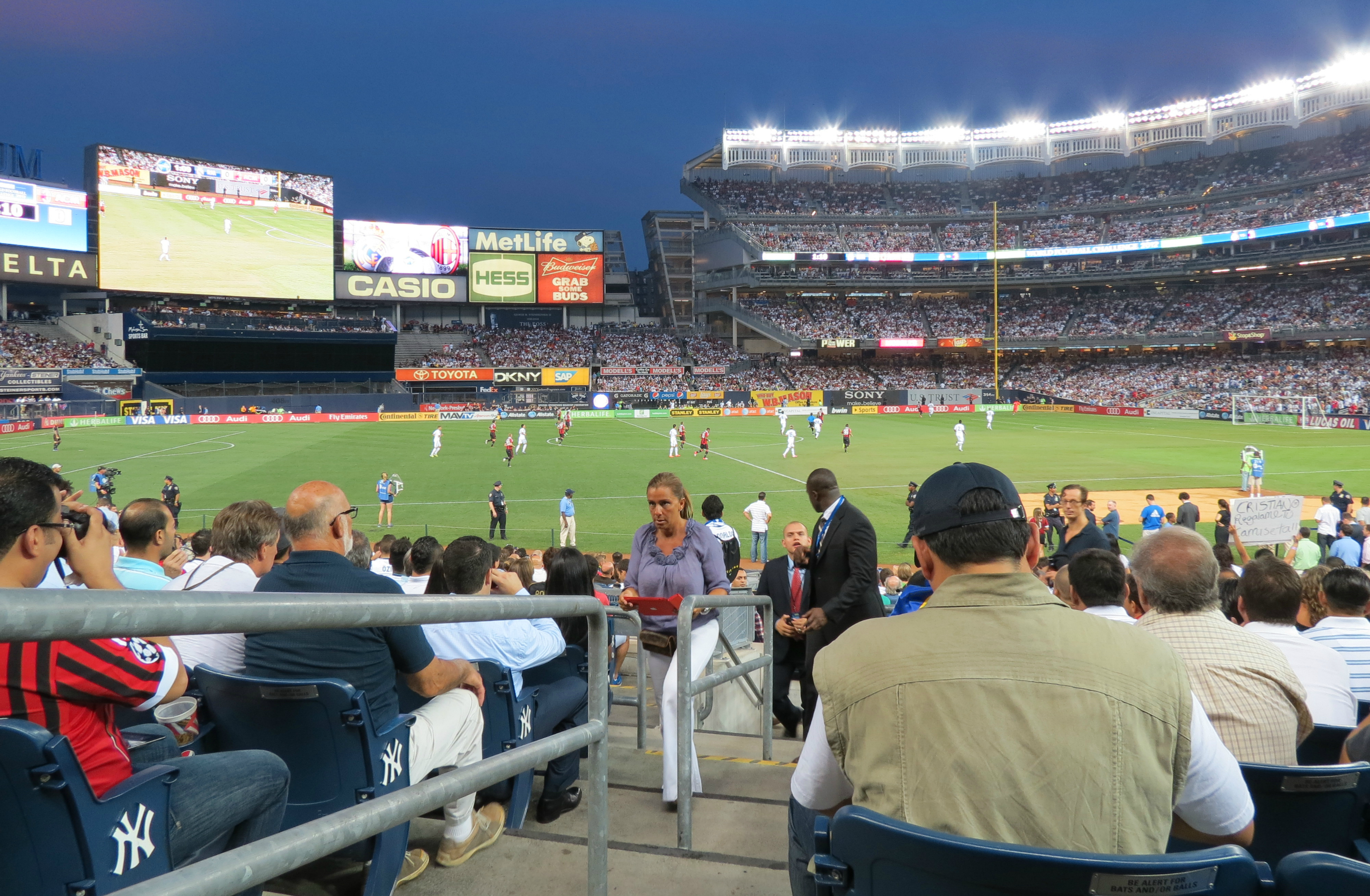
The club currently plays most of its home games at Yankee Stadium in the Bronx

On April 21, 2014, the club confirmed that they would play their first season home games at Yankee Stadium, and that plans for a future stadium were in progress.

Before the official team was announced, plans were presented by MLS to build a soccer stadium in Flushing Meadows–Corona Park in Queens. However, due to opposition to building a stadium on park land as well as objections from the New York Mets, who play nearby, the site lost favor once the new team was announced. The team came up with an alternate proposal to build the stadium in the Bronx adjacent to Yankee Stadium. In 2015, New York property lawyer Martin Edelman, a member of Manchester City's board of directors, said that New York City had abandoned plans for the Bronx site. On August 17, 2017, the club's architects attended a site visit of Belmont Park on Long Island held by the Empire State Development Corporation for parties interested in developing land adjacent to the racetrack.

Club president Jon Patricof confirmed in September 2017 that the franchise "(has) multiple sites under active consideration – some involve public processes and some are private." On September 25, 2017, it was reported that the club would submit a proposal to build a soccer-specific stadium on the 43-acre (17 ha) site at Belmont Park. On December 19, 2017, the site at Belmont Park was selected by the Empire State Development Corporation for the New York Islanders' new 18,000-seat arena, ending the club's pursuit of a soccer-specific stadium at the site.

On September 23, 2017, New York City played a home match at Pratt & Whitney Stadium at Rentschler Field in East Hartford, Connecticut, 107 miles (172 km) from the city, due to a scheduling conflict with a rescheduled Yankees game.

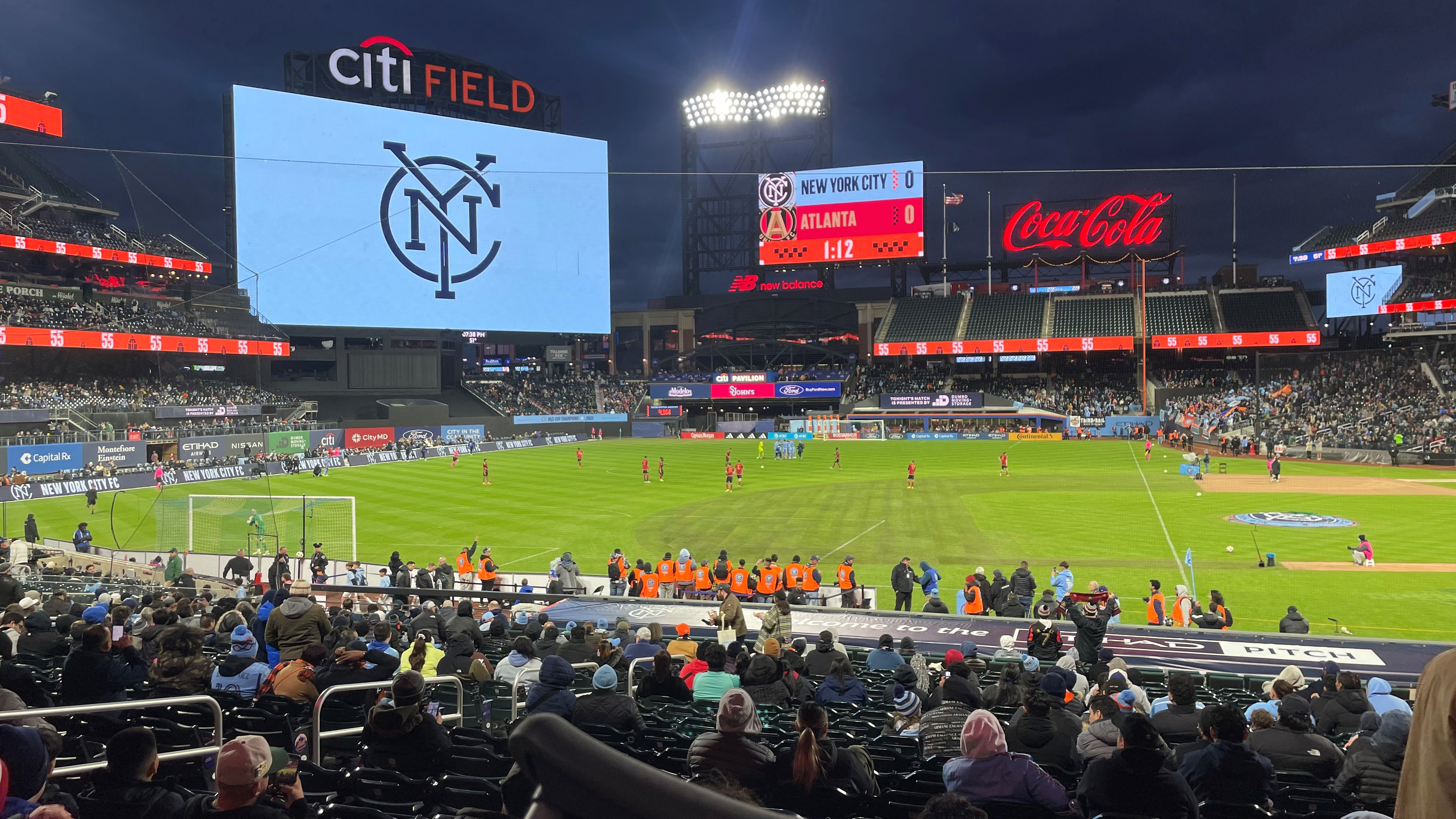
Citi Field before a New York City FC match

On October 22, 2017, New York City played their final regular season home match at Queens' Citi Field, home of the New York Mets, due to another scheduling conflict with a Yankees American League Championship Series game at Yankee Stadium.

In April 2018, new plans for the Harlem River Yards development in the south Bronx were revealed, for the land north of the Willis Avenue Bridge; the area would be anchored by the new stadium of 26,000 seats, which would be designed by Rafael Viñoly. On April 25, 2018, it was reported by club president Jon Patricof that the club is focusing on other sites more seriously than Harlem Yards. "We submitted something to the State [of New York] as part of a request for expressions of interest," said Patricof about the Harlem River Yards site. "But that's it. That site is not an active site."

In 2020, they used Red Bull Arena for two matches of the 2020 CONCACAF Champions League due to both Yankee Stadium and Citi Field undergoing unavoidable winterization procedures at the time. The team would also use the arena again between August and September 2020 after scheduling conflicts at Yankee Stadium prevented the team from using the stadium. The club hosted an additional eight home matches at Red Bull Arena for the 2021 MLS Season due to scheduling conflicts at Yankee Stadium.

In 2022, after NYCFC appeared again for the 2022 CONCACAF Champions League, the club later confirmed that neither Yankee Stadium nor Citi Field are approved venues by CONCACAF for the CONCACAF Champions League, meaning that any CCL matches would be required to be played at a CONCACAF approved venue such as Red Bull Arena or at another available CONCACAF approved venue. Both the Round of 16 and Quarterfinals were required to be played outside of the New York City area, with the Round of 16 match played at the Banc of California Stadium in Los Angeles, California due to the close proximity of LA Galaxy's home stadium where they played their first MLS season match, as well as Pratt & Whitney Stadium in East Hartford, Connecticut. The club played at Red Bull Arena in April 2022 for the second leg of the semifinals. They again played at Red Bull Arena in August 2024 for a quarterfinals match in the CONCACAF Champions Cup.

In November 2022, New York City and NYCFC came to an agreement to build Etihad Park, a 25,000-seat stadium in Willets Point, Queens. Construction began in December 2024 and is expected to be completed in time for the 2027 regular season.

== Culture ==
=== Supporters ===
New York City's official supporter group, The Third Rail, began to form after the club's announcement in May 2013, when fans met through social media, and through member drives and viewing parties for 2014 FIFA World Cup matches. It had registered 1,600 members before the team's first season. Although the group operates independently from the club, it was recognized as the official supporter group and has received exclusive access to one section in Yankee Stadium. Then-group president Chance Michaels said the name reflected the group's desire to "power NYCFC" the way the third rail powers the New York City Subway system.

Before the club began play in March 2015, the club's season-ticket membership had already surpassed 14,000, and by April 2015 season-ticket sales had reached 16,000. In October of that year, the club announced that it had sold 20,000 season tickets for the inaugural season.

The club recognized Los Templados #12 as its second official supporters group on February 11, 2022.

=== Rivalries ===
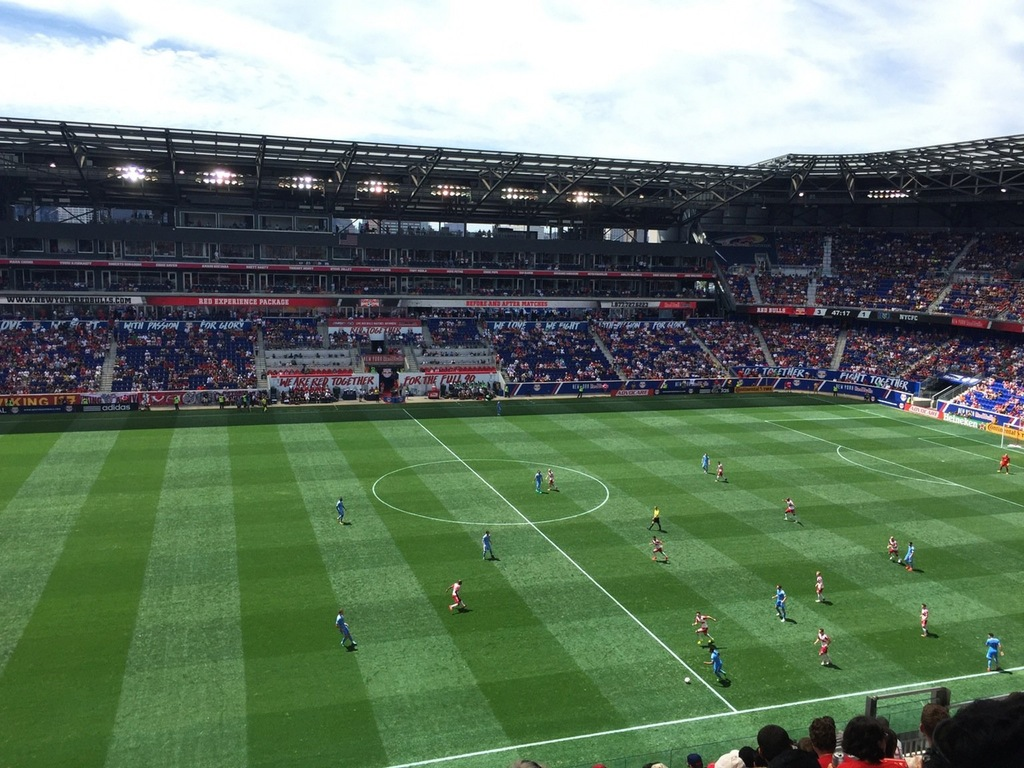
Hudson River Derby played at the Red Bull Arena in 2016.

In May 2015, the New York metropolitan area experienced a genuine local derby in MLS league play for the first time, when New York City played their first game against the New York Red Bulls. Although initially regarded as a manufactured rivalry with little of the traditional banter apparent between long-time local rivals, the first meetings between the two clubs displayed an increasing level of animosity between the two sides. The Red Bulls won the first encounter between the two, a league game on May 10, 2015, at Red Bull Arena. A series of brawls between supporters of the two teams occurred before and after matches between the two teams. The contest has been dubbed the Hudson River Derby by supporters.

Outside of their traditional rivalry with the Red Bulls, NYCFC has also developed a rivalry with the Philadelphia Union, in line with many other New York-Philadelphia sports rivalries. Though early fixtures between the two clubs were relatively routine, the rivalry began to develop after New York City eliminated the Union in the 2021 Eastern Conference Final after the latter lost several players for violating MLS's COVID-19 protocols. This rivalry further developed when the two sides faced off again in the 2022 Eastern Conference Final in the following season, with the Union winning the rematch. After many years of insignificance, Philadelphia Union defeated New York City 1–0 to seal the 2025 Supporters Shield, only for NYCFC to get revenge a month later, knocking the Union out of the 2025 Eastern Conference Semifinal.

=== Social media campaigns ===
In 2015, MLS hosted a contest between New York City and New York Red Bulls ahead of the Hudson River Derby on June 28. The team with the most votes would have the Empire State Building lit up in their favor. New York City, with over one million Facebook followers, launched the 'WINNYCFC' campaign on the platform and won the contest. In the 2016 MLS season, the club started the 'We Are One' campaign on social media, followed by the 'Support Your City' campaign during the playoffs later that year.

== Players and staff ==
=== Roster ===
As of September 22, 2026

Note: Flags indicate national team as defined under FIFA eligibility rules; some limited exceptions apply. Players may hold more than one non-FIFA nationality.

No.	Pos.	Nation	Player
2	DF	USA	Nico Cavallo
3	DF	USA	Matt Miazga
5	DF	AUS	Kai Trewin
6	DF	USA	James Sands
7	FW	ARG	Nicolás Fernández Mercau
8	MF	USA	Andres Perea
9	FW	CIV	Bénie Traoré
10	MF	ARG	Maxi Moralez
11	FW	BRA	Talles Magno
13	DF	BRA	Thiago Martins (captain)
15	MF	USA	Kevin Pierre
16	FW	CRC	Alonso Martínez
17	MF	AUT	Hannes Wolf
18	GK	TTO	Greg Ranjitsingh
20	FW	BRA	Luighi (on loan from Palmeiras)
21	MF	AUS	Aiden O'Neill
22	DF	IRL	Kevin O'Toole

No.	Pos.	Nation	Player
23	DF	USA	Max Murray
24	DF	JAM	Tayvon Gray
26	FW	ARG	Agustin Ojeda
27	MF	USA	Cooper Flax
29	MF	USA	Máximo Carrizo
30	GK	ESA	Tomás Romero
31	GK	USA	Mac Learned
32	MF	USA	Jonathan Shore
34	DF	BRA	Raul Gustavo
38	DF	USA	Drew Baiera
45	DF	USA	Kamran Acito
47	MF	USA	Jacob Arroyave
49	GK	USA	Matt Freese
55	MF	USA	Keaton Parks
87	FW	ESP	Arnau Farnós
88	FW	SLE	Malachi Jones

=== Out on loan ===
Note: Flags indicate national team as defined under FIFA eligibility rules; some limited exceptions apply. Players may hold more than one non-FIFA nationality.

No.	Pos.	Nation	Player
9	FW	SRB	Jovan Mijatović (at Eintracht Braunschweig until December 31, 2026)
14	MF	ARG	Julián Fernández (at Rosario Central until December 31, 2026)
99	FW	JAM	Seymour Garfield-Reid (at Sporting Kansas City until December 31, 2026)

=== Current technical staff ===
Executive
Chief executive officer	Brad Sims
Vice president for partnerships	Andres Gonzalez
Vice president for communications	Sam Cooke
Sporting director	Todd Dunivant
Coaching staff
Head coach	Vacant
Assistant coach	Mehdi Ballouchy
Assistant coach	Robert Vartughian
Assistant coach	Leon Hapgood
Goalkeeping coach	Danny Cepero
Head Athletic Trainer	Martin Ramiz
Youth technical coordinator	Rodrigo Marion

Last updated: November 9, 2022

=== Executives ===
Title	Name	Tenure
President	Tim Pernetti	September 9, 2013 – February 1, 2015
President	Tom Glick	February 1, 2015 – March 1, 2016
President	Jon Patricof	March 1, 2016–December 31, 2018
CEO	Brad Sims	January 1, 2019 – present

== Affiliates and club academy ==
The club's official reserve squad and minor-league affiliate is New York City FC II, who play in the third-tier MLS Next Pro league. NYCFC II plays home games at Belson Stadium in Queens and, beginning in 2024, Icahn Stadium on Randalls Island, following a $3 million donation from the main club to install a new Kentucky bluegrass pitch.

New York City also began building its youth development program in April 2014 by partnering with eight local youth soccer clubs. The club formally announcing the creation of an academy in February 2015, beginning with a single team at U-13 and U-14 level. The academy saw its first success in 2017, with the U-16 team winning the Generation Adidas Cup, becoming the first major silverware earned by New York City FC in any capacity.

Considering the club is part of City Football Group, the following clubs are all natural affiliates with NYCFC: Manchester City, Girona, Lommel, Troyes, Palermo, Montevideo City, Bahia, Bolívar, Melbourne City, Yokohama F. Marinos, Peng City, Geylang International, İstanbul Başakşehir, and Vannes OC.

=== Prior affiliates ===
The USL's Wilmington Hammerheads were New York City's first affiliate club, announced on January 16, 2015. One year later, both clubs announced a long-term extension to that original agreement. On April 21, 2016, the club also announced that the Long Island Rough Riders would be their official Premier Development League partner beginning with the 2016 season. After the Wilmington Hammerheads dropped to an amateur league following the 2016 season, New York City further announced another affiliation agreement, partnering with San Antonio on February 9, 2017.

== Team records ==
=== Year-by-year ===
For the full season-by-season history, see List of New York City FC seasons.

Season	League										Position		Playoffs	USOC	Continental / Other		Average attendance (Note: Average attendance only includes statistics from regular season matches.)	Top goalscorer(s) (Note: Top goalscorer(s) includes all goals scored in the regular season, MLS Cup Playoffs, U.S. Open Cup, MLS is Back Tournament, CONCACAF Champions League, FIFA Club World Cup, and other competitive continental matches.)	
Season	League	Pld	W	L	D	GF	GA	GD	Pts	PPG	Conf.	Overall	Playoffs	USOC	Continental / Other		Average attendance	Name(s)	Goals
2015	MLS	34	10	17	7	49	58	–9	37	1.09	8th	17th	DNQ	R4	DNE		29,016	(Spain) David Villa	18
2016	MLS	34	15	10	9	62	57	+5	54	1.59	2nd	4th	QF	R4	DNQ		27,196	(Spain) David Villa	23
2017	MLS	34	16	9	9	56	43	+13	57	1.68	2nd	2nd	QF	R4	DNQ		22,177	(Spain) David Villa	24
2018	MLS	34	16	10	8	59	45	+14	56	1.65	3rd	7th	QF	R4	DNQ		23,211	(Spain) David Villa	15
2019	MLS	34	18	6	10	63	42	+21	64	1.88	1st	2nd	QF	QF	DNQ		21,107	(Brazil) Héber	15
2020	MLS	23	12	8	3	37	25	+12	39	1.70	5th	7th	R1	NH	CONCACAF Champions League MLS is Back Tournament	QF QF	N/A	(Argentina) Valentín Castellanos (Paraguay) Jesús Medina	7
2021	MLS	34	14	11	9	56	36	+20	51	1.50	4th	8th	**W**	NH	Leagues Cup	QF	5,937	(Argentina) Valentín Castellanos	23
2022	MLS	34	16	11	7	57	41	+16	55	1.62	3rd	5th	SF	QF	Campeones Cup	**W**	17,180	(Argentina) Valentín Castellanos	13
2023	MLS	34	9	11	14	35	39	-4	41	1.21	11th	22nd	DNQ	RO32	Leagues Cup	RO32	19,816	(Brazil) Gabriel Pereira	6
2024	MLS	34	14	12	8	54	49	+5	50	1.47	6th	13th	QF	DNE	Leagues Cup	QF	21,765	(Costa Rica) Alonso Martínez	16
2025	MLS	34	17	12	5	50	44	+6	56	1.65	5th	9th	SF	RO32	Leagues Cup	GS	21,971	(Costa Rica) Alonso Martínez	17
Total		**363**	**157**	**117**	**89**	**578**	**479**	**+99**	**560**	**1.54**	—	—	—	—	—		—	(Spain) **David Villa**	**80**

1. Avg. attendance include statistics from league matches only.
2. Top goalscorer(s) includes all goals scored in League, MLS Cup Playoffs, U.S. Open Cup, CONCACAF Champions League, MLS is Back Tournament, FIFA Club World Cup, and other competitive continental matches.

=== International competition ===
Scores and results list New York City FC's goal tally first.

Year	Competition	Round	Club	Home	Away	Aggregate
2020	CONCACAF; Champions League	Round of 16	(Costa Rica) San Carlos	1–0	5–3	6–3
2020	CONCACAF; Champions League	Quarterfinals	(Mexico) UANL	0–1	0–4	0–5
2022	CONCACAF; Champions League	Round of 16	(Costa Rica) Santos de Guápiles	4–0	2–0	6–0
2022	CONCACAF; Champions League	Quarterfinals	(Guatemala) Comunicaciones	3–1	2–4	5–5 (A)
2022	CONCACAF; Champions League	Semifinals	(United States) Seattle Sounders FC	1–1	1-3	2-4

=== Head coaches ===
- Across all competitions, including regular season, playoff, Leagues Cup, CONCACAF Champions League, U.S. Open Cup, and MLS is Back Tournament games.

As of November 26, 2024.

All-Time New York City Coaching Stats
Coach	Nationality	Tenure	Games	Win	Loss	Draw	Win %
Jason Kreis	United States	December 11, 2013 – November 2, 2015	35	10	18	7	28.57
Patrick Vieira	France	January 1, 2016 – June 11, 2018	90	40	28	22	44.44
Domènec Torrent	Spain	June 12, 2018 – November 8, 2019	60	29	16	15	48.33
Ronny Deila	Norway	January 6, 2020 – June 13, 2022	90	44	27	19	48.89
Nick Cushing	England	June 13, 2022 – November 26, 2024	107	37	39	31	34.58
Pascal Jansen	Netherlands	November 26, 2024 – November 8, 2026	0	0	0	0	—

=== Captains ===
Name	Nationality	Years
David Villa	Spain	2015–2019
Alexander Ring	Finland	2019–2021
Sean Johnson	United States	2021–2023
Thiago Martins	Brazil	2023–

=== Average attendance ===
As of 2024 season.

New York City average attendance
Season	Regular season	MLS Cup Playoffs
2015	29,021	-
2016	27,196	28,355
2017	22,321	23,246
2018	23,211	17,176
2019	21,107	19,829
2020	No attendance permitted due to COVID pandemic.	
2021	9,541	25,267
2022	17,179	18,066
2023	19,842	-
2024	21,764	19,585

== Honors ==
=== Domestic ===
- **MLS Cup**
  - Champions (1): 2021
- **Supporters' Shield**
  - Runners-up (2): 2017, 2019
- **Eastern Conference (Playoff)**
  - Champions (1): 2021
  - Runners-up (2): 2022, 2025
- **Eastern Conference (Regular Season)**
  - Champions (1): 2019
  - Runners-up (2): 2016, 2017

=== International ===
- **Campeones Cup**
  - Champions (1): 2022

== See also ==
- Soccer in the New York metropolitan area
- Manchester City
- Melbourne City
- Montevideo City Torque
- Soccer in New York City
- Expansion of Major League Soccer
