= Arnau Farnós =

Spanish footballer (born 2003)

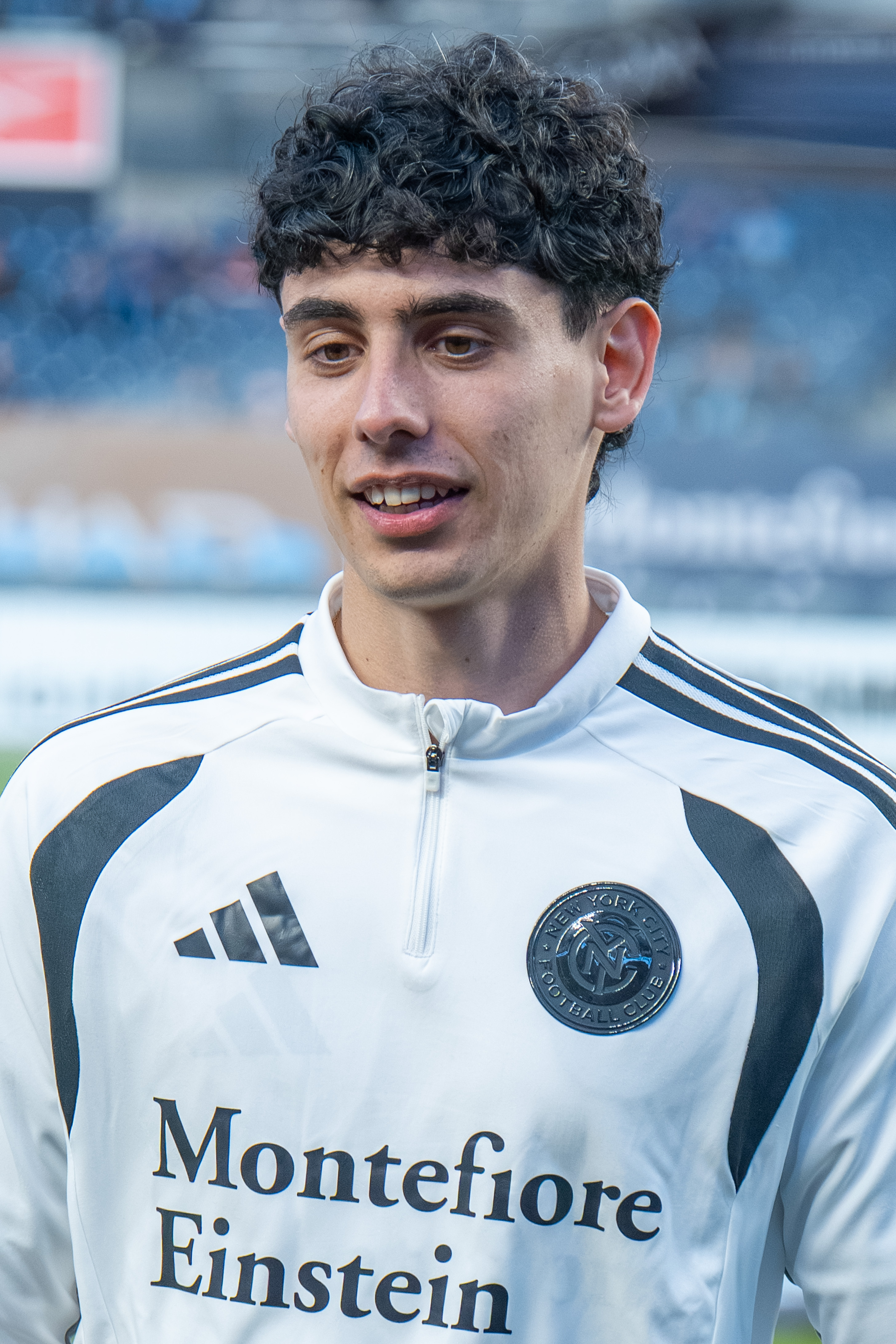
- Farnós with New York City FC in 2026

Personal information
- Full name: Arnau Farnós
- Date of birth: January 18, 2003 (age 23)
- Place of birth: Riudoms, Catalonia, Spain
- Height: 5 ft 9 in (1.75 m)
- Positions: Attacking midfielder; forward

Team information
- Current team: New York City FC
- Number: 87

Youth career
- Barcelona
- Celta Vigo
- Girona

College career
Years	Team	Apps	(Gls)
2022–2025	Oregon State Beavers	60	(28)

Senior career*
Years	Team	Apps	(Gls)
2026	New York City FC II	2	(0)
2026–	New York City FC	7	(0)
- * Club domestic league appearances and goals

Arnau Farnós (born January 18, 2003) is a Spanish professional footballer who plays as an attacking midfielder and forward for New York City FC in Major League Soccer (MLS). He played college soccer for the Oregon State Beavers, where he became the first player in program history to earn multiple United Soccer Coaches All-America honors, finishing his career tied for the program record in points and tied for fourth in career goals.

== Early life ==
Farnós was born in Riudoms, a small municipality in Catalonia, Spain. He came through the youth academies of FC Barcelona, Celta Vigo, and Girona FC before moving to the United States to pursue college soccer.

== College career ==
Farnós enrolled at Oregon State University in 2022 to play for the Oregon State Beavers in NCAA Division I in the West Coast Conference (WCC). In his sophomore season of 2023, he tallied one assist on the year. He broke out in his junior season of 2024, scoring nine goals — second in the WCC — and recording three assists, including a hat trick against Gonzaga in a 4–2 win and a brace in a 2–1 win over Michigan State. For his performances he was named West Coast Conference Midfielder of the Year, All-WCC First Team, and United Soccer Coaches All-Region, and earned Third Team All-American honors — the first All-American in Oregon State men's soccer history.

Despite being selected by New York City FC in the third round of the 2025 MLS SuperDraft, Farnós opted to return to Oregon State for his senior season, with NYCFC retaining his MLS rights. In his senior season of 2025, Farnós had one of the strongest individual campaigns in program history, scoring 9 goals and finishing with 28 career goals, tied for fourth in program history, while also finishing tied for the program's all-time record of 75 career points. He led the nation in points per game and was third in the NCAA in goals per game, earning WCC Offensive Player of the Year honors. He was named a United Soccer Coaches Third Team All-American for the second consecutive year, becoming the first player in Oregon State program history to earn multiple All-America honors. Oregon State finished the season 10–5–2, placing second in the WCC and qualifying for the NCAA Division I Men's Soccer Tournament.

== Professional career ==
=== New York City FC II ===
Following his senior season, Farnós signed with New York City FC II in MLS NEXT Pro ahead of the 2025–26 season. He signed four short-term agreements with the club, making appearances with both NYCFC II and the first team.

=== New York City FC ===
On April 24, 2026, New York City FC signed Farnós to a first-team contract through the 2026 MLS season, with club options through the 2027–28 season. NYCFC Sporting Director Todd Dunivant said of the signing: "Arnau has taken advantage of his opportunities with both the first team and New York City FC II and has shown that he belongs. His soccer IQ has earned the trust of his teammates and the staff." Farnós had previously made his MLS debut as a substitute on April 11, 2026, in a match at Vancouver Whitecaps FC. He scored his first senior goal in NYCFC's 5–2 win over Westchester SC in the Lamar Hunt U.S. Open Cup.

== Honors ==
Individual

- WCC Midfielder of the Year: 2024
- All-WCC First Team: 2024, 2025
- United Soccer Coaches All-Region: 2024, 2025
- United Soccer Coaches Third Team All-American: 2024, 2025
- WCC Offensive Player of the Year: 2025
