= Nicolás Fernández (footballer, born 2000) =

Argentine footballer (born 2000)

- Fernández with New York City FC in 2026

Personal information
- Full name: Nicolás Ezequiel Fernández Mercau
- Date of birth: 11 January 2000 (age 26)
- Place of birth: Buenos Aires, Argentina
- Height: 1.72 m (5 ft 8 in)
- Positions: Forward; attacking midfielder; right winger

Team information
- Current team: New York City FC
- Number: 7

Youth career
- San Lorenzo

Senior career*
| Years | Team | Apps | (Gls) |
| 2018–2022 | San Lorenzo | 48 | (2) |
| 2022–2025 | Elche | 91 | (10) |
| 2025– | New York City FC | 42 | (19) |
- * Club domestic league appearances and goals as of 30 October 2026

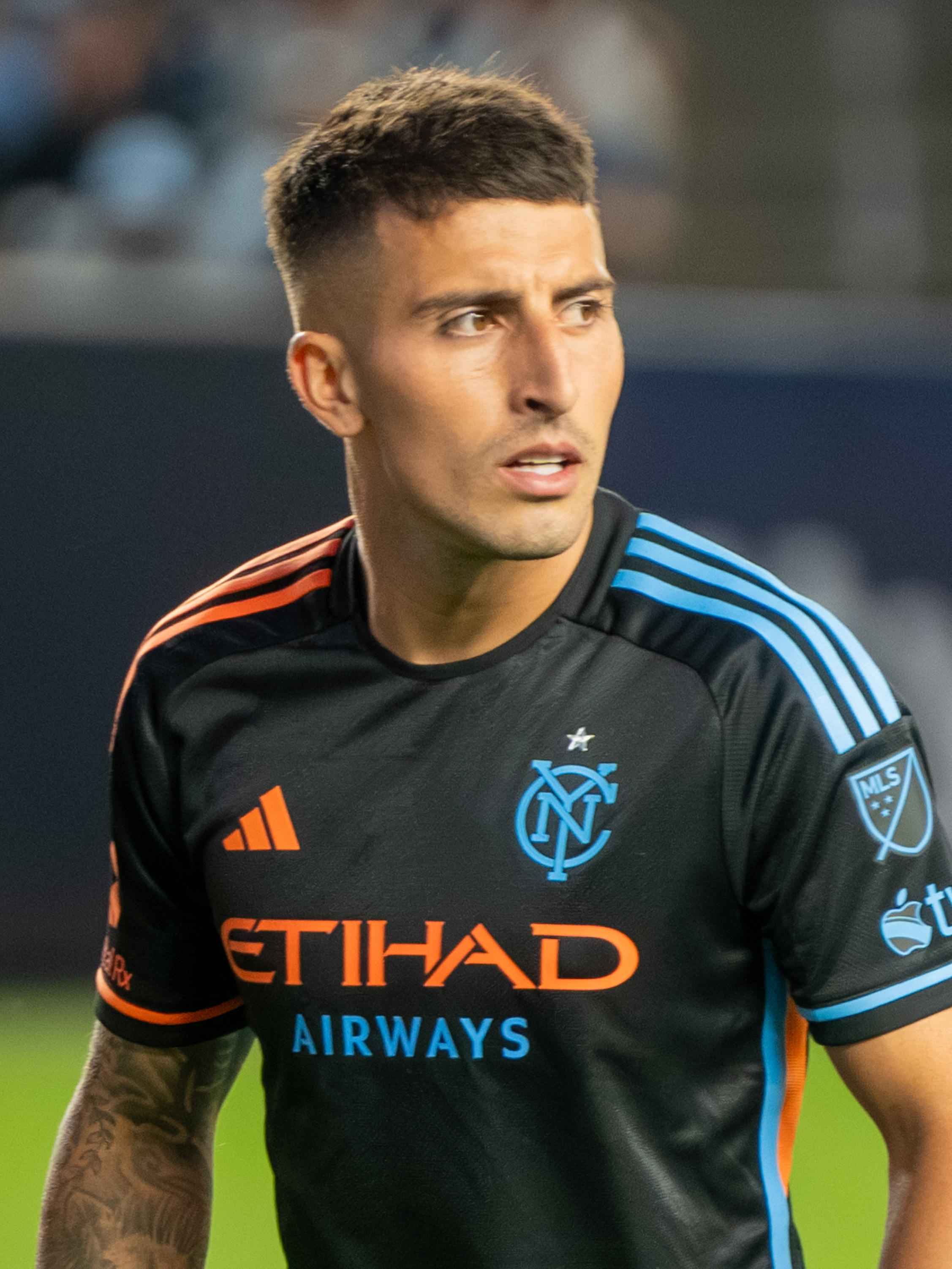
Fernández with New York City FC in 2025

Nicolás Ezequiel Fernández Mercau (born 11 January 2000) is an Argentine professional footballer who plays as a forward, attacking midfielder or right winger for Major League Soccer side New York City FC.

== Club career ==
=== San Lorenzo ===
Fernández progressed through all of the youth levels at San Lorenzo. He signed his first professional contract on 5 September 2018, prior to appearing on the bench for a Copa Argentina defeat to Temperley in October. He didn't appear on another first-team teamsheet until November 2020; for a Copa de la Liga Profesional match with Estudiantes, though again didn't get onto the pitch. Fernández's senior debut soon arrived though, with Mariano Soso selecting to come on for Juan Ramírez in a victory away to Aldosivi on 14 November.

=== Elche ===
On 1 September 2022, Fernández moved abroad and signed a five-year contract with La Liga side Elche CF.

=== New York City FC ===
On 11 July 2025, Fernández signed with Major League Soccer side New York City FC for an undisclosed fee.

== Career statistics ==
As of 15 November 2020.

Appearances and goals by club, season and competition
| Club | Season | League | | | Cup | | League Cup | | Continental | | Other | | Total | |
| Club | Season | Division | Apps | Goals | Apps | Goals | Apps | Goals | Apps | Goals | Apps | Goals | Apps | Goals |
|---|---|---|---|---|---|---|---|---|---|---|---|---|---|---|
| San Lorenzo | 2018–19 | Primera División | 0 | 0 | 0 | 0 | 0 | 0 | 0 | 0 | 0 | 0 | 0 | 0 |
| San Lorenzo | 2019–20 | Primera División | 0 | 0 | 0 | 0 | 0 | 0 | — | | 0 | 0 | 0 | 0 |
| San Lorenzo | 2020–21 (Note: Soccerway counts Copa de la Liga Profesional appearances as league appearances.) | Primera División | 1 | 0 | 0 | 0 | 0 | 0 | — | | 0 | 0 | 1 | 0 |
| Career total | | | 1 | 0 | 0 | 0 | 0 | 0 | 0 | 0 | 0 | 0 | 1 | 0 |
