= Prince Amponsah =

Prince Amponsah may refer to:

- Prince Amponsah (actor), Canadian actor
- Prince Amponsah (footballer) (born 1996), Ghananian footballer who plays as a striker
