= Nico Cavallo =

American soccer player (born 2001)

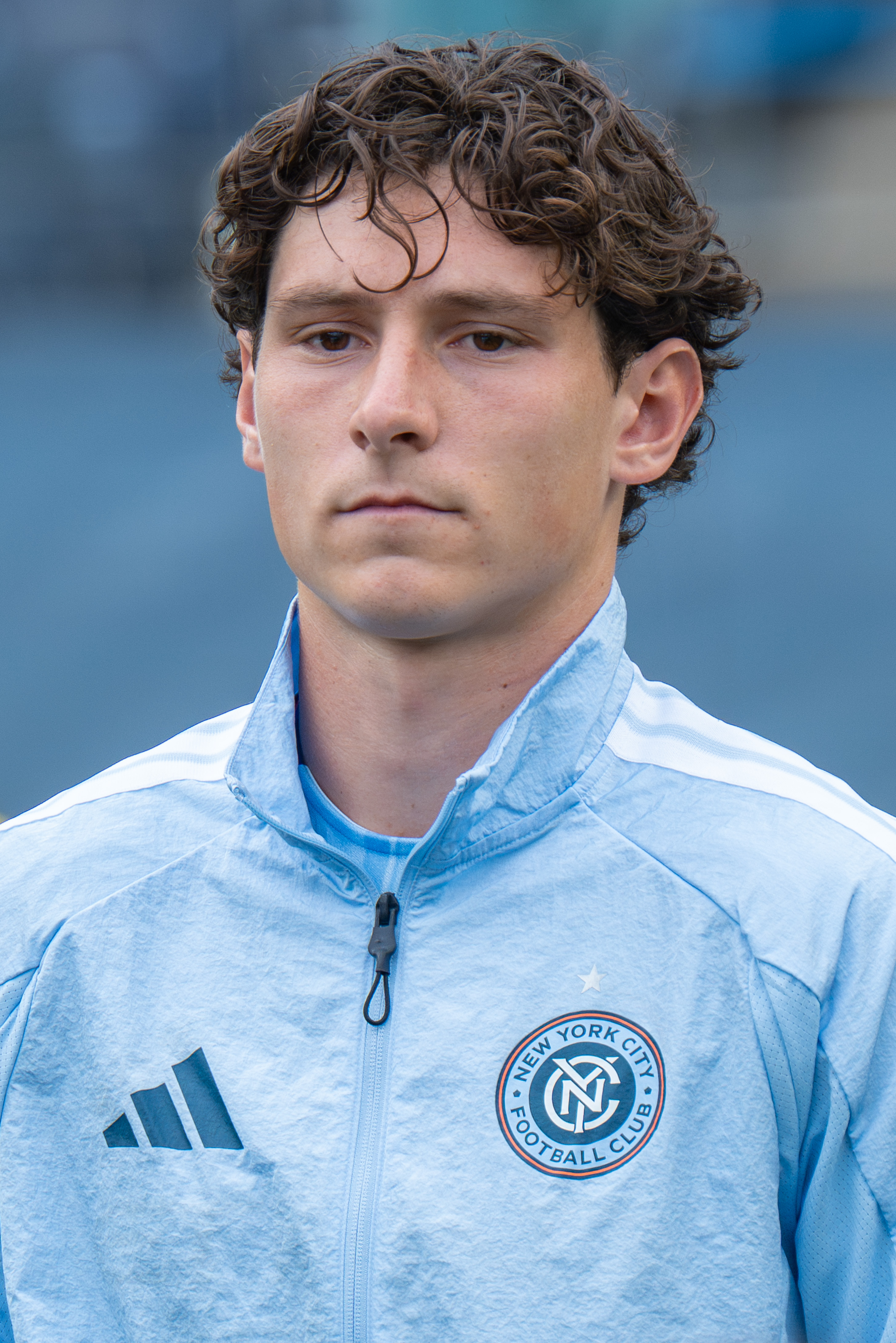
- Cavallo with New York City FC in 2026

Personal information
- Full name: Nicholas Cavallo
- Date of birth: December 27, 2001 (age 24)
- Place of birth: Richmond, Virginia, U.S.
- Height: 6 ft 1 in (1.85 m)
- Position: Left-back

Team information
- Current team: New York City FC
- Number: 2

Youth career
- Richmond Strikers

College career
Years	Team	Apps	(Gls)
2020–2023	Davidson Wildcats	58	(1)
2024	UCLA Bruins	19	(1)

Senior career*
Years	Team	Apps	(Gls)
2022–2023	Long Island Rough Riders	30	(0)
2024	Asheville City SC	11	(0)
2025–	New York City FC	34	(0)
2025–	New York City FC II	5	(1)
- * Club domestic league appearances and goals as of November 8, 2026

Nicholas Cavallo (born December 27, 2001) is an American soccer player who plays for New York City FC in Major League Soccer.

== Playing career ==
=== Youth ===
Cavallo was born in Richmond, Virginia where he played club soccer with local side Richmond Strikers.

=== College ===
In 2020, Cavallo attended Davidson College to play college soccer. He played four seasons with the Wildcats, making 58 appearances, scoring one goal and tallying eight assists. In 2024, Cavallo attended University of California, Los Angeles as a graduate student, where he earned all-Big Ten Second-Team honors after making 19 appearances with one goal and two assists to his name.

Whilst at college, Cavallo also spent time in the USL League Two with Long Island Rough Riders in 2022 and 2023, and Asheville City SC in 2024.

=== Professional ===
On December 20, 2024, Cavallo was selected 88th overall in the 2025 MLS SuperDraft by New York City FC. He earned a first time contract with the club on February 21, 2025, signing a one-year deal.Had his option picked up for the 2026 and 2027 seasons.
