= 2025 New York City FC season =

New York City FC
2025 season
- Head coach: Pascal Jansen
- Stadium: Yankee Stadium (The Bronx, New York); Citi Field (Queens, New York) (6 matches)
- MLS: Conference: 5th Overall: 9th
- MLS Cup playoffs: Conference finals
- U.S. Open Cup: Round of 32
- Leagues Cup: League phase
- Top goalscorer: League: Alonso Martínez (17); All: Alonso Martínez (21)
- Average home league attendance: 21,591
Home colors	Away colors

The 2025 New York City FC season was the club's 11th season in Major League Soccer (MLS), the top division of soccer in the United States. The club played most of its home games at Yankee Stadium and several games at Citi Field. NYCFC began their season on February 22 against Inter Miami CF in Florida; their first home match was on March 15 against the New England Revolution.

== Player movement ==
=== In ===
No.	Pos.	Player	Transferred from	Fee/notes	Date	Source
10	AM	Maximiliano Moralez	Free Agent	Re-Signed	January 13, 2025	(1)
18	GK	Greg Ranjitsingh	Free Agent	Free Transfer	January 14, 2025	(2)
23	CB	Max Murray	Vermont Catamounts men's soccer	Picked in the First Round of the	February 21, 2025	(3)
2	LB	Nico Cavallo	UCLA Bruins men's soccer	Picked in the Third Round of the	February 21, 2025	(4)
21	DM	Aiden O'Neill	Standard Liège	Transfer	April 25, 2025	(5)
7	AM	Nicolás Fernández Mercau	Elche CF	Transfer	July 11, 2025	(6)
34	CB	Raul Gustavo	Ferencvárosi TC	Transfer	August 15, 2025	(7)

=== Out ===
No.	Pos.	Player	Transferred to	Fee/notes	Date	Source
1	GK	Luis Barraza	D.C. United	$150,000 in General Allocation Money	December 9, 2024	(8)
6	DM	James Sands	FC St. Pauli	Loan	January 1, 2025	(9)
18	LB	Christian McFarlane	Manchester City F.C.	Transfer	January 27, 2025	(10)
7	ST	Jovan Mijatović	Oud-Heverlee Leuven	Loan	January 31, 2025	(11)
10	AM	Santiago Rodríguez	Botafogo FR	Transfer	February 22, 2025	(12)
5	CB	Birk Risa	Molde FK	Transfer	July 14, 2025	(13)
9	ST	Monsef Bakrar	GNK Dinamo Zagreb	Transfer	August 1, 2025	(14)

=== Roster ===
As of September 14, 2025

Note: Flags indicate national team as defined under FIFA eligibility rules; some limited exceptions apply. Players may hold more than one non-FIFA nationality.

No.	Pos.	Nation	Player
2	DF	USA	Nico Cavallo
5	DF	NOR	Birk Risa
7	MF	ARG	Nicolás Fernández
8	MF	USA	Andrés Perea
9	FW	ALG	Monsef Bakrar
11	FW	ARG	Julián Fernández
12	DF	SRB	Strahinja Tanasijević
13	DF	BRA	Thiago Martins
16	FW	CRC	Alonso Martínez
17	FW	AUT	Hannes Wolf
18	GK	TTO	Greg Ranjitsingh
21	MF	AUS	Aiden O'Neill
22	DF	IRL	Kevin O'Toole
23	DF	USA	Max Murray
24	DF	JAM	Tayvon Gray
26	FW	ARG	Agustín Ojeda

No.	Pos.	Nation	Player
27	MF	ARG	Maxi Moralez
29	MF	USA	Máximo Carrizo
30	GK	ESA	Tomás Romero
32	MF	USA	Jonny Shore
33	DF	USA	Prince Amponsah
34	DF	BRA	Raul Gustavo
35	DF	SLO	Mitja Ilenič
36	FW	USA	Zidane Yañez
38	DF	USA	Drew Baiera
44	GK	USA	Alex Rando
47	MF	USA	Jacob Arroyave
49	GK	USA	Matt Freese
55	MF	USA	Keaton Parks
80	MF	USA	Justin Haak
88	FW	SLE	Malachi Jones
99	FW	JAM	Seymour Garfield-Reid

=== Out on loan ===
Note: Flags indicate national team as defined under FIFA eligibility rules; some limited exceptions apply. Players may hold more than one non-FIFA nationality.

No.	Pos.	Nation	Player
6	MF	USA	James Sands (at FC St. Pauli)
7	FW	SRB	Jovan Mijatović (at OH Leuven)
43	FW	BRA	Talles Magno (at Corinthians)

=== Current technical staff ===
Executive
Chief executive officer	Brad Sims
Vice president for partnerships	Andres Gonzalez
Vice president for communications	Sam Cooke
Sporting director	David Lee
Coaching staff
Head coach	Pascal Jansen
Assistant coach	Mehdi Ballouchy
Assistant coach	Robert Vartughian
Assistant coach	Leon Hapgood
Goalkeeping coach	Danny Cepero
Head Athletic Trainer	Kevin Christen
Youth technical coordinator	Rodrigo Marion

Last updated: November 9, 2022

== Competitions ==
Win Draw Loss

All matches are in Eastern Time

=== Preseason ===
January 24 1	Real Salt Lake	2–2	New York City FC	Santa Barbara, California
3:05 PM EST	Marczuk 37'; Ojeda 60'	Report	Parks 13'; Martínez 14'
Note: Behind Closed Doors.

January 27 2	LA Galaxy	0–2	New York City FC	Carson, California
3:00 PM EST			Bakrar (2nd half); Fernández (2nd half)	Stadium: Dignity Health Sports Park; Attendance: 0
Note: Behind Closed Doors.

February 5 3 (CVI)	New York City FC	0–0	Sporting Kansas City	Indio, California
6:00 p.m. EST		Report		Stadium: Empire Polo Club

February 8 4 (CVI)	New York City FC	3–1	San Diego FC	Indio, California
3:00 p.m.EST	Martinez 28', 65'; Bakrar 39'; Romero (yellow card) 88'	Report	NcNair 19'; Alvarado (yellow card) 35'; Tverskov (yellow card) 61'; Diop (yellow card) 73'	Stadium: Empire Polo Club

February 12 5 (CVI)	New York City FC	1–3	St. Louis City SC	Indio, California
6:00 p.m. EST	Risa 86'	Report	Hartel 9'; Becher 67', 79'	Stadium: Empire Polo Club

February 15 6 (CVI)	New York City FC	1–0	Minnesota United FC	Indio, California
3:00 p.m. EST	Martínez 78'	Report		Stadium: Empire Polo Club

=== Major League Soccer ===
==== League tables ====
===== Eastern Conference =====
MLS Eastern Conference table (2025)
Pos	Team	Pld	W	L	T	GF	GA	GD	Pts	Qualification
3	Inter Miami CF (C)	34	19	7	8	81	55	+26	65	Qualification for round one
4	Charlotte FC	34	19	13	2	55	46	+9	59	Qualification for round one
5	New York City FC	34	17	12	5	50	44	+6	56	Qualification for round one
6	Nashville SC	34	16	12	6	58	45	+13	54	Qualification for round one
7	Columbus Crew	34	14	8	12	55	51	+4	54	Qualification for round one

Source: MLS
Rules for classification: 1) points; 2) total wins; 3) total goal differential; 4) total goals scored; 5) fewer disciplinary points; 6) away goal differential; 7) away goals scored; 8) home goals differential; 9) home goals scored; 10) coin toss (2 clubs tied) or drawing of lots (≥3 clubs tied)
(C) MLS Cup champions

===== Overall =====
Overall MLS standings table (2025)
Pos	Team	Pld	W	L	T	GF	GA	GD	Pts	Qualification
7	Charlotte FC	34	19	13	2	55	46	+9	59	
8	Minnesota United FC	34	16	8	10	56	39	+17	58	
9	New York City FC	34	17	12	5	50	44	+6	56	
10	Seattle Sounders FC (L)	34	15	9	10	58	48	+10	55	Qualification for the CONCACAF Champions Cup round of 16 (Note: As winners of Leagues Cup)
11	Nashville SC (U)	34	16	12	6	58	45	+13	54	Qualification for the CONCACAF Champions Cup round one (Note: As winners of U.S. Open Cup)

Source: MLS
Rules for classification: 1) points; 2) total wins; 3) total goal differential; 4) total goals scored; 5) fewer disciplinary points; 6) away goal differential; 7) away goals scored; 8) home goals differential; 9) home goals scored; 10) coin toss (2 clubs tied) or drawing of lots (≥3 clubs tied)
(L) Leagues Cup winners; (U) U.S. Open Cup winners

== Overview ==
Competition	First match	Last match	Starting round	Final position	Record							
Competition	First match	Last match	Starting round	Final position	Pld	W	D	L	GF	GA	GD	Win %
Major League Soccer	February 22, 2025	October 18, 2025	Matchday 1	TBD	25	12	5	8	36	30	+6	48.00
MLS Cup Playoffs	TBD	TBD	TBD	TBD	0	0	0	0	0	0	+0	—
U.S. Open Cup	May 7, 2025	May 7, 2025	Round of 32	Round of 32	1	0	0	1	0	1	−1	0.00
Leagues Cup	July 29, 2025	August 5, 2025	Matchday 1	League phase	3	1	0	2	3	5	−2	33.33
Total					29	13	5	11	39	36	+3	44.83

Last updated: August 17, 2025
Source: Competitions

== Results summary ==
Overall								Home						Away					
Pld	Pts	W	L	T	GF	GA	GD	W	L	T	GF	GA	GD	W	L	T	GF	GA	GD
34	56	17	12	5	50	44	+6	11	6	0	28	21	+7	6	6	5	22	23	−1

Last updated: October 4, 2025
Source: MLS Results
Pld = Matches played; Pts = Points; W = Matches won; T = Matches tied; L = Matches lost; GF = Goals for; GA = Goals against; GD = Goal difference

=== Results by round ===
Round	1	2	3	4	5	6	7	8	9	10	11	12	13	14	15	16	17	18	19	20	21	22	23	24	25	26	27	28	29	30	31	32	33	34
Stadium	A	A	H	H	A	A	H	H	A	A	H	H	A	H	H	H	A	H	A	H	A	A	A	A	H	A	H	A	H	H	H	A	A	H
Result	D	L	W	W	D	L	L	W	L	W	W	L	D	W	W	L	D	W	L	W	L	W	D	W	W	W	L	W	W	W	L	W	L	L
Points	1	1	4	7	8	8	8	11	11	14	17	17	18	21	24	24	25	28	28	31	31	34	35	38	41	44	44	47	50	53	53	56	56	56
Position (East)	5	10	8	7	8	10	11	10	10	9	8	10	9	7	6	8	9	7	9	7	7	7	8	8	8	8	8	7	4	3	5	3	5	5

Updated to match(es) played on October 4, 2025. Source: Match reports
A = Away; H = Home; N = Neutral; W = Win; D = Draw; L = Loss; = Conference leader; = Playoffs berth; = Wild card berth

== Match results ==
Win Draw Loss Void Postponed

February 22 1	Inter Miami CF	2–2	New York City FC	Fort Lauderdale, Florida
2:30 PM EST	Avilés 5', (red card) 23'; Alba (yellow card) 23'; Cremaschi (yellow card) 41'; Segovia 90+10'; Messi (yellow card) 90+11'	Report	Ilenič 26'; Tanasijević (yellow card) 45+1'; Martínez 55'; Freese (yellow card) 90+4'	Stadium: Chase Stadium; Attendance: 21,184; Referee: Alexis Da Silva

March 1 2	Los Angeles FC	1–0	New York City FC	Los Angeles, California
10:30 PM EST	Ordaz (yellow card) 57'; Hollingshead 86'	Report	Parks (yellow card) 42'; Bakrar (yellow card) 45+1'	Stadium: BMO Stadium; Attendance: 22,021; Referee: Chris Penso

March 8 3	New York City FC	2–1	Orlando City SC	New York, New York
7:30 PM EST	Martínez 59'; Moralez (yellow card) 66'; Wolf 71'; O'Toole (yellow card) 77' (yellow-red card) 86'	Report	Angulo (yellow card) 61'; Muriel 69'; Atuesta (yellow card) 82'	Stadium: Yankee Stadium; Attendance: 25,846; Referee: Pierre-Luc Lauziere

March 15 4	New York City FC	2–1	New England Revolution	New York, New York
7:30 PM EDT	Fernández 38'; Shore (yellow card) 61'; Martínez 68'; K. Parks (yellow card) 90'	Report	Thiago 26' (o.g.); Feingold (yellow card) 90+4'	Stadium: Yankee Stadium; Attendance: 18,892; Referee: Malik Badawi

March 22 5	Columbus Crew	0–0	New York City FC	Columbus, Ohio
7:30 PM EDT		Report		Stadium: Lower.com Field; Attendance: 20,235; Referee: Rubiel Vazquez

March 29 6	Atlanta United FC	4–3	New York City FC	Atlanta, Georgia
7:30 PM EDT	Miranchuk 42'; Parks 62' (o.g.); Almirón 75'; Latte Lath 84'; Guzan (yellow card) 90+4'	Report	Wolf 15', 51'; Martínez 48' (pen.)	Stadium: Mercedes-Benz Stadium; Attendance: 42,518; Referee: Filip Dujic

April 6 7	New York City FC	1–2	Minnesota United FC	New York, New York
5:00 PM EDT	Risa (yellow card) 36'; Parks 89'	Report	Oluwaseyi 2'; Trapp 29'; Boxall (yellow card) 43'	Stadium: Yankee Stadium; Attendance: 18,279; Referee: Sergii Boiko

April 12 8	New York City FC	1–0	Philadelphia Union	New York, New York
7:30 PM EDT	Martínez 55'	Report	Makhanya (yellow card) 33'; Westfield (yellow card) 90+3'	Stadium: Citi Field; Attendance: 19,897; Referee: Guido Gonzales Jr.

April 19 9	New England Revolution	2–0	New York City FC	Foxborough, Massachusetts
7:30 PM EDT	Campana 43'; Ganago 48'; Polster (yellow card) 54'	Report	Gray (yellow card) 90+2'	Stadium: Gillette Stadium; Attendance: 21,081; Referee: Marcos de Oliveira

April 26 10	Toronto FC	0–1	New York City FC	Toronto, Ontario
2:30 PM EDT	Flores (yellow card) 21'; Long (yellow card) 31'	Report	O'Toole (yellow card) 22'; Martínez 64' (pen.); Fernández (yellow card) 71'; Gray (yellow card) 90+7'	Stadium: BMO Field; Attendance: 22,699; Referee: Pierre-Luc Lauziere

May 4 11	New York City FC	1–0	FC Cincinnati	New York, New York
5:00 PM EDT	Fernández 9'; Freese (yellow card) 39'; Wolf (yellow card) 72'; Haak (yellow card) 75'	Report	Miazga (yellow card) 12'; Evander (yellow card) 90+2'	Stadium: Citi Field; Attendance: 21,611; Referee: Drew Fischer

May 10 12	New York City FC	0–1	CF Montréal	New York, New York
7:30 PM EDT	Haak (yellow card) 44'; Ilenič (yellow card) 90'	Report	Piette (yellow card) 39'; Owusu 48'; Waterman (yellow card) 87'	Stadium: Yankee Stadium; Attendance: 19,679; Referee: Chris Penso

May 14 13	D.C. United	0–0	New York City FC	Washington, D.C.
7:30 PM EDT	Rowles (yellow card) 23'; Enow (yellow card) 34'; Tubbs (yellow card) 87'	Report	Perea (yellow card) 57'	Stadium: Audi Field; Attendance: 14,283; Referee: Armando Villarreal

May 17 14	New York City FC	2–0	New York Red Bulls	New York, New York
4:30 PM EDT	Martínez 13'; Fernández (yellow card) 31'; Moralez 50'	Report	Eile (yellow card) 42'; Nealis (yellow card) 54'; Duncan (yellow card) 63'	Stadium: Citi Field; Attendance: 30,804; Referee: Allen Chapman

May 25 15	New York City FC	3–1	Chicago Fire FC	New York, New York
5:00 PM EDT	Haak (yellow card) 14'; Moralez (yellow card) 28'; Gray (yellow card) 45+3'; Martins (yellow card) 56'; Bakrar 58'; Wolf 70'; Martínez 89' (pen.)	Report	Zinckernagel 19'; Gutiérrez (red card) 32'; Dean (yellow card) 45+1'; D'Avilla (yellow card) 60' (yellow-red card) 84'	Stadium: Yankee Stadium; Attendance: 18,524; Referee: Rosendo Mendoza

May 28 16	New York City FC	0–3	Houston Dynamo FC	New York, New York
7:30 PM EDT	Gray (yellow card) 65'; O'Neill (yellow card) 85'; Cavallo (yellow card) 90+2'	Report	Haak 26' (o.g.); Dueñas (yellow card) 35'; Segal 50', 90+4' (pen.); Andrade (yellow card) 63'	Stadium: Yankee Stadium; Attendance: 17,070; Referee: Rubiel Vazquez

May 31 17	Nashville SC	2–2	New York City FC	Nashville, Tennessee
4:30 PM EDT	Surridge 27', 41'; Acosta (yellow card) 84'	Report	O'Neill (yellow card) 40'; Wolf 54', 87'; Tanasijević (yellow card) 75'; Parks (yellow card) 83'	Stadium: Geodis Park; Attendance: 28,351; Referee: Jon Freemon

June 12 18	New York City FC	4–0	Atlanta United FC	New York, New York
7:30 PM EDT	Moralez 44'; Bakrar 55'; Wolf 57', 59'	Report		Stadium: Yankee Stadium; Attendance: 18,062; Referee: Sergii Boiko

June 28 19	CF Montréal	1–0	New York City FC	Montreal, Quebec
7:30 PM EDT	Loturi 23'	Report	Perea (yellow card) 37'; Moralez (yellow card) 56'; Gray (yellow card) 90+4'	Stadium: Saputo Stadium; Attendance: 17,070; Referee: Victor Rivas

July 3 20	New York City FC	3–1	Toronto FC	New York, New York
7:30 PM EDT	Wolf 20'; Martínez (yellow card) 25'; Ilenič 49'; O'Toole 74'	Report	Long (yellow card) 2'; Longstaff (yellow card) 19'; Dominguez (yellow card) 67'; Romero 70' (o.g.); Henry (yellow card) 71'	Stadium: Yankee Stadium; Attendance: 19,395; Referee: Fotis Bazakos

July 12 21	Charlotte FC	2–0	New York City FC	Charlotte, North Carolina
7:30 PM EDT	Toklomati 14'; Marshall-Rutty (yellow card) 17'; Scardina (yellow card) 61'; Vargas 81'; Bronico (yellow card) 84'	Report	Wolf (yellow card) 43'; Fernández (yellow card) 67'; Moralez (yellow card) 90+4'	Stadium: Bank of America Stadium; Attendance: 28,164; Referee: Guido Gonzales Jr.

July 16 22	Orlando City SC	1–2	New York City FC	Orlando, Florida
7:30 PM EDT	Jansson 36'; Araújo (yellow card) 60'	Report	Tanasijević (yellow card) 39'; O'Neill (yellow card) 85'; Smith 87' (o.g.); Martínez 90+1'	Stadium: Inter&Co Stadium; Attendance: 18,521; Referee: Jair Marrufo

July 19 23	Sporting Kansas City	1–1	New York City FC	Kansas City, Kansas
8:30 PM EDT	Bassong (yellow card) 47'; Bartlett (yellow card) 66'; Sallói 74'	Report	Perea 22'	Stadium: Children's Mercy Park; Attendance: 16,987; Referee: Timothy Ford

July 25 24	FC Dallas	3–4	New York City FC	Frisco, Texas
8:30 PM EDT	Musa 15'; Farrington 17', 45+8'; Torquato (yellow card) 25'; Cappis (yellow card) 90+2'	Report	Shore 11'; Martínez 22', 46', 84'; Haak (yellow card) 31'; Perea (yellow card) 73'	Stadium: Toyota Stadium; Attendance: 11,004; Referee: Jon Freemon

August 17 26	New York City FC	2–1	Nashville SC	New York, New York
5:00 PM EDT	Perea 40' (yellow card) 90+4'; Moralez (yellow card) 58'; Martínez 77' (yellow card) 82'	Report	Shaffelburg 10'; Tagseth (yellow card) 48'; Surridge (yellow card) 82'	Stadium: Yankee Stadium; Attendance: 20,077; Referee: Filip Dujic

August 23 27	FC Cincinnati	0–1	New York City FC	Cincinnati, Ohio
7:30 PM EDT		Report	Fernández Mercau (yellow card) 29'; Martínez 55'; Ojeda (yellow card) 63'; O'Toole (yellow card) 89'	Stadium: TQL Stadium; Attendance: 25,513; Referee: Victor Rivas

August 30 28	New York City FC	1–2	D.C. United	New York, New York
7:30 PM EDT	Haak 19'; Perea (yellow card) 30'	Report	Schnegg (yellow card) 18'; Pirani 43', 77'; Benteke (yellow card) 45+1'; Enow (yellow card) 87'; Herrera (yellow card) 90+4'	Stadium: Yankee Stadium; Attendance: 20,192; Referee: Alexis Da Silva

September 13 29	Chicago Fire FC	1–3	New York City FC	Chicago, Illinois
8:30 PM EDT	Zinckernagel 13'	Report	O'Neill (yellow card) 37'; Fernández 40'; Martínez 57'; Reid 90+3'	Stadium: Soldier Field; Attendance: 20,636; Referee: Pierre-Luc Lauziere

September 17 25	New York City FC	3–2	Columbus Crew	New York, New York
7:30 PM EDT	Wolf 45+3', 73'; Fernández 90+4', (yellow card) 90+5'	Report	Gazdag 40' (pen.); Abou Ali 60'	Stadium: Yankee Stadium; Attendance: 17,413; Referee: Sergii Boiko
Note: Match originally scheduled for August 9 at Citi Field rescheduled and moved to Yankee Stadium due to field maintenance at the former.

September 20 30	New York City FC	2–0	Charlotte FC	New York, New York
7:30 PM EDT	Martínez 11' (pen.), 58' (pen.); N. Fernández (yellow card) 45+3'; O'Toole (yellow card) 60'; Perea (yellow card) 64'; J. Fernández (yellow card) 90+3'	Report	Khalina (yellow card) 10'; Bronico (yellow card) 16'; Byrne (yellow card) 20'; Westwood (yellow card) 58'; Privett (yellow card) 90+6'	Stadium: Yankee Stadium; Referee: Timothy Ford
Note: Match originally scheduled for September 19.

September 24 31	New York City FC	0–4	Inter Miami CF	New York, New York
7:30 PM EDT	Perea (yellow card) 32'; Haak (yellow card) 83'	Report	Silvetti (yellow card) 18'; Alba (yellow card) 41'; Rodríguez 43'; Messi 74', 86'; Suárez 83' (pen.)	Stadium: Citi Field; Attendance: 40,845; Referee: Filip Dujic

September 27 32	New York Red Bulls	2–3	New York City FC	Harrison, New Jersey
7:30 PM EDT	Edwards (yellow card) 8'; Hall 23'; Forsberg 47'; Gjengarr (yellow card) 82'; S. Nealis (yellow card) 90+3'	Report	N. Fernández 2'; Perea 26'; Moralez (yellow card) 54'; Martins 65'; J. Fernández (yellow card) 90+12'	Stadium: Sports Illustrated Stadium; Attendance: 25,219; Referee: Guido Gonzales Jr.

October 4 33	Philadelphia Union	1–0	New York City FC	Chester, Pennsylvania
7:30 PM EDT	Jean Jacques (yellow card) 19'; Glesnes (yellow card) 36'; Uhre 40'; Damiani (yellow card) 55'	Report	O'Toole (yellow card) 34'	Stadium: Subaru Park; Attendance: 19,176; Referee: Jon Freemon

October 18 34	New York City FC	1–2	Seattle Sounders FC	New York, New York
6:00 PM EDT	O'Toole (yellow card) 45+2'; Haak (yellow card) 45+3'; Freese (yellow card) 45+8'; Fernández 82'	Report	Morris 61'; Rusnák (yellow card) 64'; Ragen 87'	Stadium: Citi Field; Attendance: 24,832; Referee: Chris Penso

=== MLS Cup playoffs ===
==== Round One ====
October 28 Round One	Charlotte FC	0–1	New York City FC	Charlotte, North Carolina
6:45 pm EDT		Report	Martínez 34'; O'Neill (yellow card) 36'; Gray (yellow card) 56'; Gustavo (yellow card) 68'; Haak (yellow card) 71'; O'Toole (yellow card) 90'	Stadium: Bank of America Stadium; Attendance: 33,709; Referee: Jon Freemon

November 1 Round One	New York City FC	0–0 (6–7 p)	Charlotte FC	New York, New York
3:30 pm EDT	O'Neill (yellow card) 27'; Gray (yellow card) 84'	Report	Diani (yellow card) 61'; Byrne (yellow card) 72'; Zaha (yellow card) 81'	Stadium: Yankee Stadium; Attendance: 19,051; Referee: Rubiel Vazquez
	Penalties
	Martínez (penalty scored); O'Neill (penalty scored); Thiago Martins (penalty scored); J. Fernández (penalty missed); Haak (penalty scored); Wolf (penalty scored); Raul Gustavo (penalty scored); Ojeda (penalty missed)		(penalty scored) Goodwin; (penalty missed) Westwood; (penalty scored) Toklomati; (penalty scored) Toffolo; (penalty scored) Zaha; (penalty scored) Malanda; (penalty scored) Diani; (penalty scored) Byrne

November 7 Round One	Charlotte FC	1–3	New York City FC	Charlotte, North Carolina
7:00 pm EST	Toklomati 81'; Goodwin (yellow card) 87'; Ream (yellow card) 90+2'	Report	N. Fernández 45+2', 90+10', (yellow card) 90+2'; Martínez 50'; Perea (yellow card) 67'; O'Neill (yellow card) 67'	Stadium: Bank of America Stadium; Attendance: 34,473; Referee: Pierre-Luc Lauzière

==== Conference Semifinals ====
November 23 Conference Semifinals	Philadelphia Union	0–1	New York City FC	Chester, Pennsylvania
7:30 pm EST	Baribo (yellow card) 33'	Report	Moralez 27', (yellow card) 35'; Wolf (yellow card) 32'; Freese (yellow card) 77'; Raul Gustavo (yellow card) 85'	Stadium: Subaru Park; Attendance: 19,210; Referee: Guido Gonzales Jr.

==== Conference Finals ====
November 29 Conference Final	Inter Miami CF	5–1	New York City FC	Fort Lauderdale, Florida
6:00 pm EST	Allende 14', 23', 89'; Weigandt (yellow card) 22'; Allen (yellow card) 33'; Silvetti 67'; Rodríguez (yellow card) 70'; Segovia 83'; Bright (yellow card) 87'	Report	Moralez (yellow card) 20'; Fernandez (yellow card) 31'; Haak 37', (yellow card) 73'; O'Toole (yellow card) 65'	Stadium: Chase Stadium; Attendance: 19,136; Referee: Jon Freemon

=== U.S. Open Cup ===
May 7 Round of 32	Pittsburgh Riverhounds SC (Pennsylvania)	1–0	(New York (state)) New York City FC	Pittsburgh, Pennsylvania
7:00 p.m. EDT	Ydrach 90+6', (yellow card) 90+7'	Report	Tanasijević (red card) 78'	Stadium: Highmark Stadium; Attendance: 3,661; Referee: Rodrigo Albuquerque

=== Leagues Cup ===
July 29 Group stage	New York City FC (United States)	0–3	(Mexico) Puebla	Harrison, New Jersey
8:00 p.m. EDT	Cavallo (yellow card) 27'; Carrizo (yellow card) 70'; Haak (yellow card) 90+3'	Report	Fedorco 2'; Moyano (yellow card) 23'; Gómez 38'; Pachuca (yellow card) 42'; Díaz (yellow card) 77'; González 88'	Stadium: Sports Illustrated Stadium; Attendance: 9,384; Referee: Iván Barton

August 1 Group stage	New York City FC (United States)	2–0	(Mexico) León	Harrison, New Jersey
6:00 p.m. EDT	Martínez 7'; Ojeda 32'	Report	Barreiro (yellow card) 59'; Funes Mori (yellow card) 90+4'	Stadium: Sports Illustrated Stadium; Attendance: 12,149; Referee: Reon Radix

August 5 Group stage	Toluca (Mexico)	2–1	(United States) New York City FC	New York, New York
7:30 p.m. EDT	Angulo 37'; Paulinho 39'; Pereira (yellow card) 45+8'; Gallardo (yellow card) 45+8'; Romero (yellow card) 57'; Morales (yellow card) 87'	Report	Martínez 10'; O'Neill (yellow card) 45+8'; Tanasijević (yellow card) 45+9'	Stadium: Yankee Stadium; Attendance: 18,496; Referee: Pierre-Luc Lauziere
