= 2024 New York City FC season =

New York City FC
2024 season
- Head coach: Nick Cushing
- Stadium: Yankee Stadium (The Bronx, New York); Citi Field (Queens, New York) (6 matches)
- MLS: Conference: 6th Overall: 13th
- MLS Cup Playoffs: Conference Semifinals
- Leagues Cup: Quarter-finals
- Average home league attendance: 23,286
- Biggest win: NYC 5–1 SJE (May 31); NY 1–5 NYC (Sept 28)
- Biggest defeat: NYC 1–5 PHL (Sept 18)
Home colors	Third colors

The 2024 New York City FC season was the club's tenth season in Major League Soccer, the top division of soccer in the United States. The club split its home games between Yankee Stadium and Citi Field, and played their season opener against Charlotte FC on February 24, 2024.

== Player movement ==
=== In ===
No.	Pos.	Player	Transferred from	Fee/notes	Date	Source
7	FW	(Serbia) Jovan Mijatović	(Serbia) Red Star Belgrade	Transfer	February 19, 2024	
8	MF	(United States) Andrés Perea	(United States) Philadelphia Union	$650,000 in General Allocation Money	January 15, 2024	
12	DF	(Serbia) Strahinja Tanasijević	(Serbia) FK Spartak Subotica	Transfer	February 5, 2024	
17	FW	(Austria) Hannes Wolf	(Germany) Borussia Mönchengladbach	Transfer	January 16, 2024	
26	FW	(Argentina) Agustín Ojeda	(Argentina) Racing Club	Transfer	February 2, 2024	
30	GK	(El Salvador) Tomás Romero	(Canada) Toronto FC	Transfer	February 6, 2024	
88	FW	(Sierra Leone) Malachi Jones	(United States) Lipscomb Bisons	Picked in the First Round of the 2024 MLS SuperDraft	January 22, 2024	

=== Out ===
No.	Pos.	Player	Transferred to	Fee/notes	Date	Source
7	DM	(United States) Alfredo Morales	(United States) San Jose Earthquakes	Transfer	January 4, 2024	
8	FW	(Brazil) Thiago Andrade	(China) Shenzhen Peng City	Loan	February 8, 2024	
19	FW	(United States) Gabe Segal	(United States) Houston Dynamo FC	Transfer	February 16, 2024	
20	AM	(United States) Richard Ledezma	(Netherlands) PSV	End of Loan	December 31, 2023	
26	MF	(Uruguay) Nicolás Acevedo	(Brazil) Bahia	Loan	January 26, 2024	
3	LB	(Argentina) Braian Cufré	(Argentina) Vélez Sarsfield	Transfer	February 12, 2024	

== Current roster ==
As of November 27, 2024

Squad No.	Name	Nationality	Position(s)	Since	Date of birth (age)	Signed from	Games played	Goals
Goalkeepers
1	Luis Barraza	(United States)	GK	2019	November 8, 1996 (age 29)	Chicago FC United	37	0
30	Tomás Romero	(El Salvador)	GK	2021	September 19, 2000 (age 26)	Toronto FC	0	0
49	Matt Freese	(United States)	GK	2023	February 9, 1998 (age 28)	Philadelphia Union	44	0
Defenders
5	Birk Risa	(Norway)	CB	2023	February 13, 1998 (age 28)	Molde FK	44	0
12	Strahinja Tanasijević	(Serbia)	DF	2024	June 12, 1997 (age 29)	FK Spartak Subotica	19	0
13	Thiago Martins Bueno	(Brazil)	CB	2022	March 17, 1995 (age 31)	Yokohama F. Marinos	106	1
18	Christian McFarlane	(England)	LB	2021	January 25, 2007 (age 19)	NYCFC Academy	13	0
22	Kevin O'Toole	(Republic of Ireland)	LB	2022	December 14, 1998 (age 27)	Princeton Tigers men's soccer	71	1
24	Tayvon Gray	(Jamaica)	RB	2017	August 19, 2002 (age 24)	New York City Academy	114	1
35	Mitja Ilenic	(Slovenia)	RB	2023	December 26, 2004 (age 21)	NK Domžale	53	1
Midfielders
6	James Sands	(United States)	DM	2017	July 6, 2000 (age 26)	Rangers F.C.	132	1
15	Andrés Perea	(United States)	DM	2023	November 14, 2000 (age 25)	Philadelphia Union	42	4
42	Piero Elias	(United States)	DM	2024	September 8, 2002 (age 24)	NYCFC II	1	0
10	Santiago Rodríguez	(Uruguay)	AM	2023	January 8, 2000 (age 26)	Montevideo City Torque	154	34
21	Andres Jasson	(United States)	MF	2020	January 17, 2002 (age 24)	New York Soccer Club	69	4
27	Maximiliano Moralez	(Argentina)	AM	2017	February 27, 1987 (age 39)	Racing Avellaneda	224	37
55	Keaton Parks	(United States)	CM	2019	August 6, 1997 (age 29)	Benfica	191	16
80	Justin Haak	(United States)	CM	2019	September 12, 2001 (age 25)	New York Soccer Club	65	1
Forwards
43	Talles Magno Bacelar Martins	(Brazil)	AM	2021	June 26, 2002 (age 24)	Vasco da Gama	101	19
9	Monsef Bakrar	(Algeria)	ST	2023	January 13, 2001 (age 25)	NK Istra 1961	48	8
11	Julián Fernández	(Argentina)	FW	2023	January 30, 2004 (age 22)	Club Atlético Vélez Sarsfield	36	4
26	Agustín Ojeda	(Argentina)	FW	2024	June 19, 2004 (age 22)	Racing Club de Avellaneda	25	3
16	Alonso Martínez	(Costa Rica)	FW	2023	October 15, 1998 (age 27)	Lommel SK	38	18
7	Jovan Mijatović	(Serbia)	FW	2024	July 11, 2005 (age 21)	Red Star Belgrade	15	1
17	Hannes Wolf	(Austria)	FW	2024	April 16, 1999 (age 27)	Borussia Monchengladbach	42	5
88	Makachi Jones	(Sierra Leone)	FW	2024	September 23, 2003 (age 23)	Lipscomb Bisons	14	1

== Competitions ==
=== Preseason ===
January 24 1	Barcelona SC	0-1	New York City FC	Bradenton, FL

January 27 2	Philadelphia Union	3-1	New York City FC	Clearwater, FL

February 7 3	San Jose Earthquakes	2-2	New York City FC	Coachella Valley, CA

February 10 4	Portland Timbers	1-1	New York City FC	Coachella Valley, CA

February 14 5	LA Galaxy	2-2	New York City FC	Coachella Valley, CA

February 17 6	Austin FC	2-3	New York City FC	Coachella Valley, CA

=== Major League Soccer ===
==== League tables ====
===== Eastern Conference =====
MLS Eastern Conference table (2024)
Pos	Team	Pld	W	L	T	GF	GA	GD	Pts	Qualification
4	Orlando City SC	34	15	12	7	59	50	+9	52	Qualification for round one and the 2025 Leagues Cup
5	Charlotte FC	34	14	11	9	46	37	+9	51	Qualification for round one and the 2025 Leagues Cup
6	New York City FC	34	14	12	8	54	49	+5	50	Qualification for round one and the 2025 Leagues Cup
7	New York Red Bulls	34	11	9	14	55	50	+5	47	Qualification for round one and the 2025 Leagues Cup
8	CF Montréal	34	11	13	10	48	64	−16	43	Qualification for the wild-card round and the 2025 Leagues Cup

Source: MLS
Rules for classification: 1) points; 2) total wins; 3) total goal differential; 4) total goals scored; 5) fewer disciplinary points; 6) away goal differential; 7) away goals scored; 8) home goals differential; 9) home goals scored; 10) coin toss (2 clubs tied) or drawing of lots (≥3 clubs tied)

===== Overall =====
Overall MLS standings table
Pos	Team	Pld	W	L	T	GF	GA	GD	Pts	Qualification
11	Charlotte FC	34	14	11	9	46	37	+9	51	Qualification for the U.S. Open Cup Round of 32 (Note: As one of the best U.S. teams in the overall table to not qualify for the 2025 CONCACAF Champions Cup)
12	Colorado Rapids	34	15	14	5	61	60	+1	50	Qualification for the CONCACAF Champions Cup Round One (Note: As third place of Leagues Cup)
13	New York City FC	34	14	12	8	54	49	+5	50	Qualification for the U.S. Open Cup Round of 32
14	Vancouver Whitecaps FC (V)	34	13	13	8	52	49	+3	47	Qualification for the CONCACAF Champions Cup Round One (Note: As winners of Canadian Championship)
15	Portland Timbers	34	12	11	11	65	56	+9	47	Qualification for the U.S. Open Cup Round of 32

Source: MLS
Rules for classification: 1) points; 2) total wins; 3) total goal differential; 4) total goals scored; 5) fewer disciplinary points; 6) away goal differential; 7) away goals scored; 8) home goals differential; 9) home goals scored; 10) coin toss (2 clubs tied) or drawing of lots (≥3 clubs tied)
(V) Canadian Championship winners

===== Match results =====
February 24 1	Charlotte FC	1–0	New York City FC	Charlotte, NC
7:30 PM EST	Malanda 8'; Westwood (yellow card) 34'; Vargas (yellow card) 73'; Urso (yellow card) 79'	Report	Ilenič (yellow card) 9'; Thiago (yellow card) 65'	Stadium: Bank of America Stadium; Attendance: 62,291; Referee: Mario Maric

March 2 2	St. Louis City SC	2–0	New York City FC	St. Louis, MO
8:30 PM EST	Markanich 21'; Pompeu (yellow card) 35'; Vassilev (yellow card) 41'; Totland (yellow card) 45+3'; Adeniran 72'; Durkin (yellow card) 82'; Ostrák (yellow card) 90'	Report	Perea (yellow card) 28'; Sands (yellow card) 52' (red card) 83'; Ilenič (yellow card) 88'	Stadium: CityPark; Attendance: 22,423; Referee: Erick Lezama Pavon

March 9 3	New York City FC	1–2	Portland Timbers	New York, NY
2:00 PM EST	Rodríguez 10', (yellow card) 76'	Report	McGraw (yellow card) 19'; Paredes (yellow card) 31'; Antony 85'; Evander 90+7'	Stadium: Yankee Stadium; Attendance: 24,774; Referee: Esteban Rosano

March 16 4	New York City FC	2–1	Toronto FC	New York, NY
7:30 PM EDT	Rodríguez 24'; Risa (yellow card) 42'; Parks (yellow card) 63' (red card) 68'; O'Toole 65'; Haak (yellow card) 90+3'; Sands (yellow card) 90+5'	Report	Marshall-Rutty 7'; Long (yellow card) 23'; Bernardeschi (yellow card) 28'; O'Neill (yellow card) 72'; Insigne (yellow card) 90+7'; Thompson (yellow card) 90+7'	Stadium: Yankee Stadium; Attendance: 18,623; Referee: Muhammad Hassan

March 23 5	FC Cincinnati	1–0	New York City FC	Cincinnati, OH
7:30 PM EDT	Acosta (yellow card) 20', (goal) 57'	Report	Perea (yellow card) 45+5'	Stadium: TQL Stadium; Attendance: 24,282; Referee: Rafael Bonilla

March 30 6	Inter Miami CF	1–1	New York City FC	Fort Lauderdale, FL
7:30 PM EDT	Suárez 15', (yellow card) 90'; Gressel (yellow card) 53'; Sailor (yellow card) 62'; Avilés (yellow card) 80'	Report	Tanasijević (yellow card) 33'; Martínez 34'; Jones (yellow card) 88'	Stadium: Chase Stadium; Attendance: 21,550; Referee: Filip Dujic

April 6 7	New York City FC	1–1	Atlanta United FC	New York, NY
7:30 PM EDT	Sands (yellow card) 15'; Rodríguez 43'; Gray (yellow card) 50'; Parks (yellow card) 74'	Report	Williams (yellow card) 61'; Thiaré 65'	Stadium: Citi Field; Attendance: 21,497; Referee: Rosendo Mendoza

April 13 8	New York City FC	2–0	New England Revolution	New York, NY
7:30 PM EDT	Freese (yellow card) 45+6'; Ojeda 57'; Parks (yellow card) 78'; Fernández 90+3'	Report	Chancalay (yellow card) 22'; Harkes (yellow card) 43'; Kessler (yellow card) 77'	Stadium: Yankee Stadium; Attendance: 20,744; Referee: Pierre-Luc Lauziere

April 20 9	New York City FC	2–0	D.C. United	New York, NY
7:30 PM EDT	Rodríguez 20'; Bakrar (yellow card) 63'; Fernández 90+1'	Report	Akinmboni (yellow card) 34'; Bartlett (yellow card) 50'	Stadium: Citi Field; Attendance: 21,073; Referee: Malik Badawi

April 27 10	New York City FC	2–1	Charlotte FC	New York, NY
7:30 PM EDT	Parks 41'; Martínez 90+3'	Report	Vargas 3', (yellow card) 50'; Urso (yellow card) 21'; Westwood (yellow card) 53'	Stadium: Yankee Stadium; Attendance: 20,119; Referee: Ismir Pekmic

May 5 11	New York City FC	0–2	Colorado Rapids	New York, NY
4:00 PM EDT	Sands (yellow card) 37'	Report	Navarro 16'; Larraz (yellow card) 20'; Bassett 86'	Stadium: Citi Field; Attendance: 19,456; Referee: Allen Chapman

May 11 12	Toronto FC	2–3	New York City FC	Toronto, ON
7:30 PM EDT	Bernardeschi (yellow card) 22' (yellow-red card) 91', (goal) 55'; Rosted (yellow card) 36'; Long (yellow card) 53'; Petretta 89'	Report	Rodríguez 23'; Martínez (yellow card) 29'; Jones 44', (yellow card) 50'; Perea 78', (yellow card) 90+9'	Stadium: BMO Field; Attendance: 26,925; Referee: Lukasz Szpala

May 15 13	Philadelphia Union	1–2	New York City FC	Chester, PA
7:30 PM EDT	Wagner (yellow card) 45'; Carranza 47'; Elliott (yellow card) 71'	Report	Martínez 2'; Wolf 45+2'; Rodríguez (yellow card) 51'; Ojeda (yellow card) 62'; Perea (yellow card) 78'; Bakrar (yellow card) 87'; Jones (yellow card) 90'	Stadium: Subaru Park; Attendance: 18,531; Referee: Tori Penso

May 18 14	New York City FC	2–1	New York Red Bulls	New York, NY
7:30 PM EDT	Wolf 3'; Sands (yellow card) 32'; Bakrar 64'	Report	Harper (yellow card) 25', (goal) 45+1'; Amaya (yellow card) 65'; Nealis (yellow card) 67' (yellow card) 90+3' (yellow-red card) 90+3'; Tolkin (yellow card) 90'	Stadium: Citi Field; Attendance: 30,731; Referee: Armando Villarreal

May 25 15	New England Revolution	0–1	New York City FC	Foxborough, MA
7:30 PM EDT	Kessler (yellow card) 13'; Borrero (yellow card) 73'; Arreaga (yellow card) 86'	Report	Bakrar (yellow card) 33'; Thiago (yellow card) 41'; Parks 81'	Stadium: Gillette Stadium; Attendance: 26,625; Referee: Ted Unkel

May 31 16	New York City FC	5–1	San Jose Earthquakes	New York, NY
7:30 PM EDT	Fernández (yellow card) 15'; Tanasijević (yellow card) 17'; Wolf 50'; Sands (yellow card) 60'; Rodríguez 80'; Martínez 85', 90+2', 90+5'	Report	Yueill (yellow card) 23'; Pellegrino 53'	Stadium: Yankee Stadium; Attendance: 20,188; Referee: Mark Allatin

June 14 17	New York City FC	2–3	Columbus Crew	New York, NY
7:30 PM EDT	Tanasijević (yellow card) 32'; Ilenič (red card) 39'; Ojeda 44'; Rodríguez 86', (yellow card) 90+15'; Moralez (yellow card) 90+9'; Parks (yellow card) 90+10'	Report	Ramírez 48'; Farsi 53'; Cheberko (yellow card) 58'; Hernández 65'; Rossi (yellow card) 90+1'	Stadium: Yankee Stadium; Attendance: 20,622; Referee: Alexis Da Silva

June 19 18	LA Galaxy	2–0	New York City FC	Carson, CA
10:30 PM EDT	Neal (yellow card) 19'; Aude (yellow card) 29'; Joveljić 41'; Fagúndez 49'; Delgado (yellow card) 62'	Report	Rodríguez (yellow card) 31'; Wolf (yellow card) 45+1'	Stadium: Dignity Health Sports Park; Attendance: 20,043; Referee: Rubiel Vazquez

June 22 19	Nashville SC	1–0	New York City FC	Nashville, TN
8:30 PM EDT	Boyd 23'	Report	Rodríguez (yellow card) 26'; Gray (yellow card) 86'	Stadium: Geodis Park; Attendance: 29,663; Referee: Victor Rivas

June 28 20	New York City FC	4–2	Orlando City SC	New York, NY
7:30 PM EDT	Rodríguez 15'; Wolf 45+4'; Ojeda 45+12'; Freese (yellow card) 78'; Thiago (yellow card) 78'; Bakrar 90+4'	Report	Thórhallsson 72'; McGuire 90+2'	Stadium: Yankee Stadium; Attendance: 21,497; Referee: Sergii Boiko

July 3 21	New York City FC	2–0	CF Montréal	New York, NY
7:30 PM EDT	Martínez 9', 56'; Sands (yellow card) 90+3'	Report	Campbell (yellow card) 52'	Stadium: Citi Field; Attendance: 18,209; Referee: Marcos de Oliveira

July 6 22	Austin FC	2–1	New York City FC	Austin, TX
8:30 PM EDT	Gallagher (yellow card) 45+4'; Zardes 45+7', 69'	Report	Perea 5'	Stadium: Q2 Stadium; Attendance: 20,738; Referee: Timothy Ford

July 13 23	Chicago Fire FC	0–0	New York City FC	Chicago, IL
8:30 PM EDT	Omsberg (yellow card) 25'; Acosta (yellow card) 45'; Koutsias (yellow card) 80'; Pineda (yellow card) 84'	Report	Haak (yellow card) 21'; Sands (yellow card) 59'	Stadium: Soldier Field; Attendance: 25,179; Referee: Rosendo Mendoza

July 17 24	Atlanta United FC	2–2	New York City FC	Atlanta, GA
7:30 PM EDT	Ríos 1'; Lobjanidze 38'; Muyumba (yellow card) 61'; Lennon (yellow card) 86'	Report	Bakrar 65'; Haak (yellow card) 77'; Talles Magno 82'	Stadium: Mercedes-Benz Stadium; Attendance: 42,524; Referee: Lukasz Szpala

July 20 25	Orlando City SC	1–1	New York City FC	Orlando, FL
7:30 PM EDT	Araújo (yellow card) 13'; Enrique 52'	Report	Sands (yellow card) 42'; Wolf 57', (yellow card) 71'; Tanasijević (yellow card) 70'; Haak (yellow card) 90+6'	Stadium: Inter&Co Stadium; Attendance: 22,827; Referee: Joe Dickerson

August 24 26	New York City FC	2–2	Chicago Fire FC	New York, NY
7:30 PM EDT	15', 22' Martínez; (yellow card) 50' Gray; (yellow card) 90' Parks; (yellow card) 90+3' Freese	Report	(yellow card) 65' Giménez; 78' Cuypers; (yellow card) 90' Navarro; 90+4' (pen.) Gutiérrez	Stadium: Citi Field; Attendance: 24,428; Referee: Malik Badawi

August 31 27	Columbus Crew	4–2	New York City FC	Columbus, OH
7:30 PM EDT	Rossi 17'; Amundsen (yellow card) 21'; Arfsten 58'; Jones 90+3'; Russell-Rowe 90+10'	Report	Martínez 4'; Moralez (yellow card) 72'; Rodríguez (yellow card) 85'; Bakrar 86'; Fernández (red card) 90+7'	Stadium: Lower.com Field; Attendance: 20,618; Referee: Ted Unkel

September 14 28	D.C. United	1–1	New York City FC	Washington, D.C.
7:30 PM EDT	Benteke (yellow card) 16', (goal) 67' (pen.); Bartlett (yellow card) 27'; Santos (yellow card) 55'; Badji (yellow card) 80'	Report	Rodríguez 32'; Sands (yellow card) 41'; Moralez (yellow card) 69'; Thiago (yellow card) 82'	Stadium: Audi Field; Attendance: 19,215; Referee: Ramy Touchan

September 18 29	New York City FC	1–5	Philadelphia Union	New York, NY
7:30 PM EDT	Martínez 45+5'; Tanasijević (yellow card) 51'; O'Toole (yellow card) 90+3'	Report	Baribo 15'; Uhre 25'; Gazdag 32', (yellow card) 42'; Glesnes 74'; Bueno 85'	Stadium: Yankee Stadium; Attendance: 19,153; Referee: Pierre-Luc Lauziere

September 21 30	New York City FC	1–1	Inter Miami CF	New York, NY
2:00 PM EDT	Tanasijević (yellow card) 27'; Rodriguez (yellow card) 71'; Parks (yellow card) 80'; Moralez (yellow card) 86'; Sands 90+5'	Report	Fray (yellow card) 35'; Alba (yellow card) 63'; Avilés (yellow card) 64'; Suárez (yellow card) 68'; Campana 75'	Stadium: Yankee Stadium; Attendance: 44,738; Referee: Jon Freemon

September 28 31	New York Red Bulls	1–5	New York City FC	Harrison, NJ
7:30 PM EDT	Reyes (yellow card) 14'; Vanzeir 28'; Stroud (yellow card) 90+5'	Report	Moralez 5'; Martínez 7', 45+5'; Perea 30'; Gray 68'	Stadium: Red Bull Arena; Attendance: 25,291; Referee: Tori Penso

October 2 32	New York City FC	3–2	FC Cincinnati	Harrison, NJ
7:30 PM EDT	Ilenič 16'; Sands (yellow card) 41'; Martínez 65'; Thiago (yellow card) 66'; Rodríguez 75' (pen.); Perea (yellow card) 84'; Gray (yellow card) 90+1'; Wolf (yellow card) 90+14'	Report	Kelsy (yellow card) 34'; Acosta 69' (pen.); Baird 90+6'	Stadium: Red Bull Arena; Referee: Guido Gonzales, Jr.

October 6 33	New York City FC	3–1	Nashville SC	Harrison, NJ
4:00 PM EDT	Rodríguez 1', 18'; Martínez 21'	Report	Zimmerman (yellow card) 45+2'; Mukhtar 58'; Yazbek (yellow card) 60'	Stadium: Red Bull Arena; Referee: Serhiy Boyko

October 19 34	CF Montréal	2–0	New York City FC	Montreal, QC
6:00 PM EDT	Clark 18', (yellow card) 59'; Martínez 45+1'; Waterman (yellow card) 88'	Report	Haak (yellow card) 7'; Parks (yellow card) 69'; Risa (yellow card) 90'	Stadium: Saputo Stadium; Attendance: 19,619; Referee: Allen Chapman

=== MLS Cup playoffs ===
==== Round One ====
October 28 First leg	FC Cincinnati	1–0	New York City FC	Cincinnati, OH
6:45 pm EDT	Orellano (yellow card) 29'; Asad 51', (yellow card) 89'	Report	Sands (yellow card) 41'; Moralez (yellow card) 82'; Gray (red card) 90+9'	Stadium: TQL Stadium; Attendance: 21,413; Referee: Sergii Boiko

November 2 Second leg	New York City FC	3–1	FC Cincinnati	New York, NY
5:00 pm EDT	Martínez 22'; Thiago Martins 40'; Rodríguez (yellow card) 52', (goal) 90+7' (pen.); Sands (yellow card) 72'	Report	Bucha (yellow card) 43'; Yedlin (yellow card) 56'; Orellano 65'; Kubo (yellow card) 68'	Stadium: Citi Field; Attendance: 19,585; Referee: Ismir Pekmic

November 9 First leg	FC Cincinnati	0–0 (5–6 p)	New York City FC	Cincinnati, OH
4:00 pm EDT	Bucha (yellow card) 65'; Powell (yellow card) 85'; Awaziem (yellow card) 90'	Report	Parks (yellow card) 11'; O'Toole (yellow card) 83'; Rodríguez (yellow card) 89'	Stadium: TQL Stadium; Attendance: 22,487; Referee: Drew Fischer
	Penalties
	Acosta (penalty scored); Asad (penalty scored); Santos (penalty scored); Bucha (penalty missed); Kelsy (penalty scored); Robinson (penalty scored); Valenzuela (penalty missed); Awaziem (penalty missed); Hadebe (penalty missed)		(penalty scored) Rodríguez; (penalty scored) Bakrar; (penalty scored) Parks; (penalty scored) Sands; (penalty missed) Thiago Martins; (penalty scored) Haak; (penalty missed) O'Toole; (penalty missed) Perea; (penalty scored) Ilenič
Note: New York City FC won the series 2–1.

==== Conference Semifinals ====
November 23 Conference Semifinals	New York City FC	0–2	New York Red Bulls	New York, NY
5:30 PM EST	Sands (yellow card) 33'; O'Toole (yellow card) 39'	Report	Carballo 16'; Vanzeir 25'; Edelman (yellow card) 28'	Stadium: Citi Field; Attendance: 24,891; Referee: Allen Chapman

=== Leagues Cup ===
The Leagues Cup took place from July 26 to August 25. New York City FC entered in the group stage in Pot 2, based on the 2023 Major League Soccer standings.

==== East 1 ====
Pos	Team	Pld	W	PW	PL	L	GF	GA	GD	Pts	Qualification	CIN	NYC	QFC
1	(United States Soccer Federation) FC Cincinnati	2	2	0	0	0	5	2	+3	6	Advance to knockout stage	—	5–2	1–0
2	(United States Soccer Federation) New York City FC	2	0	1	0	1	2	4	−2	2	Advance to knockout stage	—	—	0–0
3	(Mexican Football Federation) Querétaro	2	0	0	1	1	0	1	−1	1		—	—	—

Source: Leagues Cup
Rules for classification: Tiebreakers

July 28 Group stage	New York City FC (United States)	0–0 (4–3 p)	(Mexico) Querétaro	New York, NY
8:00 PM EDT	Bakrar (yellow card) 23'; Magno (yellow card) 38'; Mijatović (yellow card) 75'	Report	Vázquez (yellow card) 17'	Stadium: Yankee Stadium; Attendance: 16,834; Referee: Keylor Herrera
	Penalties
	Martínez (penalty scored); Thiago Martins (penalty scored); Moralez (penalty scored); Mijatović (penalty scored)		(penalty scored) Barrera; (penalty scored) Sosa; (penalty scored) Lértora; (penalty missed) Escamilla; (penalty missed) Cisneros

August 5 Group stage	FC Cincinnati (United States)	4–2	(United States) New York City FC	Cincinnati, OH
8:00 PM EDT	Nwobodo (yellow card) 78'; Bucha 79'; Asad 82'; Kubo 86'; Sérgio Santos 89'	Report	Fernández (yellow card) 33'; Rodríguez 25'; Mijatović 61'; Wolf (yellow card) 90+3'	Stadium: TQL Stadium; Attendance: 22,098; Referee: Ismael Rosario López

==== Knockout stage ====
August 9 Round of 32	New England Revolution (United States)	1–1 (6–7 p)	(United States) New York City FC	Foxborough, MA
19:30	Wood 40'	Report	Rodríguez 35' (pen.), (yellow card) 41'; Sands (yellow card) 45+2'; Haak (yellow card) 90+5'	Stadium: Gillette Stadium; Attendance: 7,267; Referee: Julio Luna (Guatemala)
	Penalties
	McNamara (penalty scored); Polster (penalty scored); Harkes (penalty scored); Arreaga (penalty scored); Bye (penalty scored); Panayotou (penalty scored); Kaye (penalty missed)		(penalty scored) Martínez; (penalty scored) Martins; (penalty scored) Moralez; (penalty scored) Sands; (penalty scored) Rodríguez; (penalty scored) Fernández; (penalty scored) Haak

August 13 Round of 16	UANL (Mexico)	1–2	(United States) New York City FC	Harrison, NJ
	Pizarro 18'; Gorriarán (yellow card) 49'	Report	Moralez 20'; Parks (yellow card) 36'; McFarlane (yellow card) 58'; Rodríguez 65', (yellow card) 83'; Gray (yellow card) 82'	Stadium: Red Bull Arena; Referee: Keylor Herrera

August 17 Quarter-finals	Columbus Crew (United States)	1–1 (4–3 p)	(United States) New York City FC	Columbus, OH
	Hernández 41'	Report	Martínez 1'; McFarlane (yellow card) 26'; Rodríguez (yellow card) 88'	Stadium: Lower.com Field; Attendance: 14,071; Referee: Joe Dickerson
	Penalties
	Camacho (penalty scored); Russell-Rowe (penalty scored); Rossi (penalty missed); Hernández (penalty scored); Jones (penalty scored)		(penalty scored) Thiago Martins; (penalty scored) Bakrar; (penalty missed) Moralez; (penalty scored) Sands; (penalty missed) Rodríguez

=== U.S. Open Cup ===
New York City FC was not sent to the tournament, but their MLS Next Pro team New York City FC II was sent instead following the deal reached on March 1, 2024.
