= Thiago Martins (footballer, born 1995) =

Brazilian footballer (born 1995)

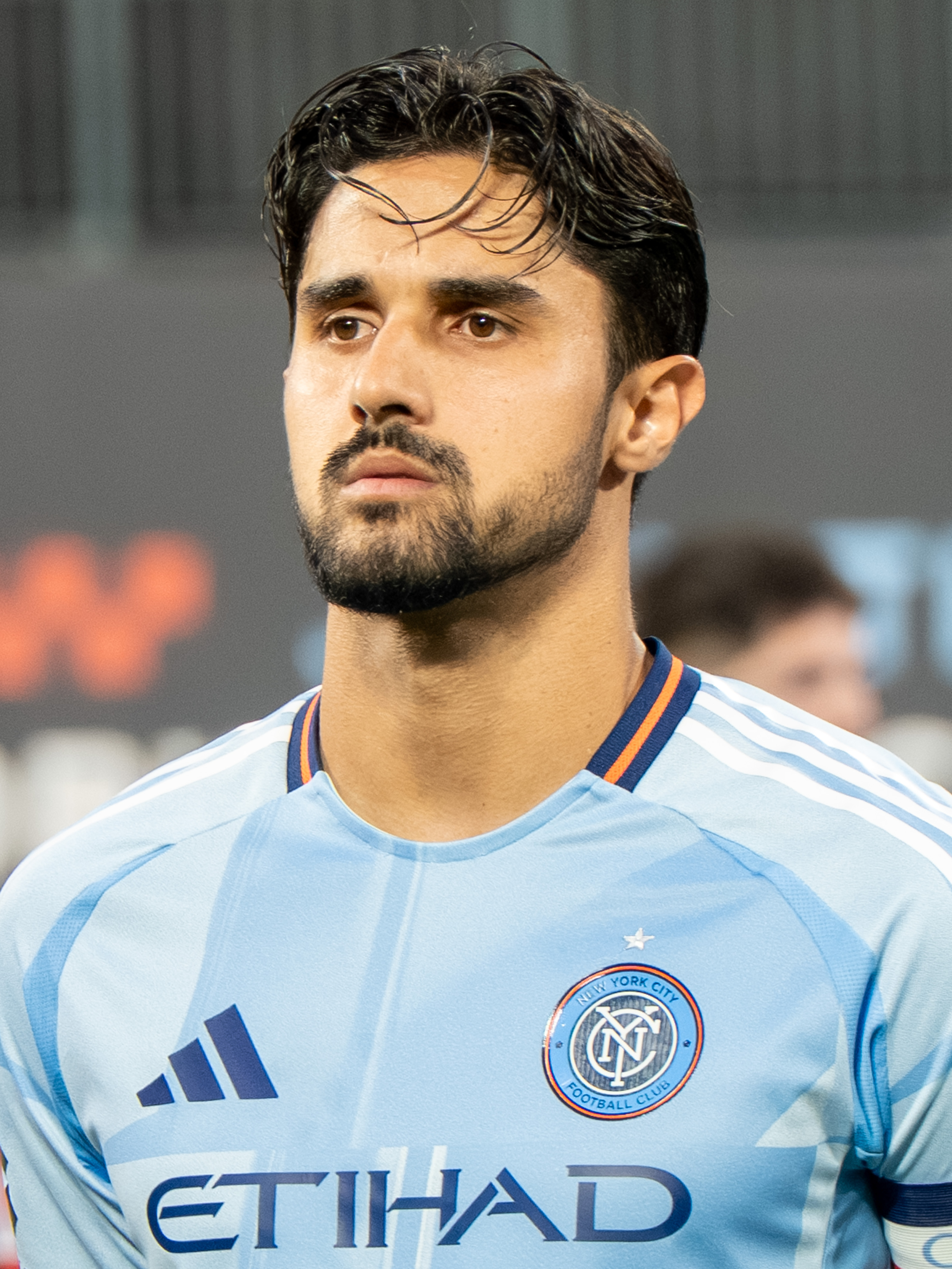
- Martins with New York City FC in 2025

Personal information
- Full name: Thiago Martins Bueno
- Date of birth: 17 March 1995 (age 31)
- Place of birth: São João Evangelista, Brazil
- Height: 1.85 m (6 ft 1 in)
- Position: Centre-back

Team information
- Current team: New York City FC
- Number: 13

Youth career
- –2014: Palmeiras

Senior career*
Years	Team	Apps	(Gls)
2013	Mogi Mirim	0	(0)
2014–2019	Palmeiras	50	(3)
2015	→ Paysandu (loan)	29	(2)
2017	→ Bahia (loan)	11	(0)
2018–2019	→ Yokohama F. Marinos (loan)	46	(0)
2020–2022	Yokohama F. Marinos	53	(1)
2022–	New York City FC	144	(1)
- * Club domestic league appearances and goals as of 14 November 2026

Thiago Martins Bueno (born 17 March 1995) is a Brazilian professional footballer who plays as a centre-back for Major League Soccer club New York City FC.

== Club career ==
=== Palmeiras ===
Martins began his career in the youth system of Palmeiras, making his professional debut in 2013. He was part of the team that won the Campeonato Brasileiro Série B that year and later contributed to Palmeiras winning the Série A title in 2016. He made over 50 appearances for the club, including loan spells at Paysandu in 2015 and Bahia in 2017.

=== Yokohama F. Marinos ===
In 2018, Martins joined J1 League side Yokohama F. Marinos on loan. After an impressive campaign, the move was made permanent in 2020. He was a key figure in the club's 2019 league title and was named to the J.League Best XI.

=== New York City FC ===
On February 7, 2022, Martins signed with New York City FC as a Designated Player, becoming the most expensive defender in MLS history at the time. He played a key role in the team’s Campeones Cup win later that year and was named NYCFC’s Etihad Player of the Month for July 2022. In 2024, he was selected as an MLS All-Star.

== Playing style ==
Martins is known for his speed, strength, and composure on the ball. He often plays in a high line and is valued for his passing range and defensive leadership. Coaches have praised his ability to transition quickly from defense to attack.

== Career statistics ==
As of Matches Played 16 October 2026

Appearances and goals by club, season, and competition
Club	Season	League			State League		National Cup		League Cup		Continental		Other		Total	
Club	Season	Division	Apps	Goals	Apps	Goals	Apps	Goals	Apps	Goals	Apps	Goals	Apps	Goals	Apps	Goals
Palmeiras	2013	Série B	1	0	—		—		—		—		—		1	0
Palmeiras	2016	Série A	17	2	8	1	2	1	—		4 (Note: Appearances in Copa Libertadores)	0	—		31	4
Palmeiras	2017	Série A	—		0	0	—		—		—		—		0	0
Palmeiras	2018	Série A	7	0	17	0	0	0	—		4	1	—		28	1
Palmeiras	Total		25	2	25	1	2	1	—		8	1	—		60	5
Paysandu (loan)	2015	Série B	29	2	—		6	0	—		—		—		35	2
Bahia (loan)	2017	Série A	11	0	—		—		—		—		—		11	0
Yokohama F. Marinos (loan)	2018	J1 League	13	0	—		1	0	4	0	—		—		18	0
Yokohama F. Marinos (loan)	2019	J1 League	33	0	—		0	0	1	0	—		—		34	0
Yokohama F. Marinos	2020	J1 League	21	1	—		—		2	0	5	0	1	0	29	1
Yokohama F. Marinos	2021	J1 League	32	0	—		1	0	4	0	—		—		37	0
Yokohama F. Marinos	Total		99	1	—		2	0	11	0	5	0	1	0	118	1
New York City FC	2022	Major League Soccer	26	0	—		1	0	3 (Note: Appearances in MLS Cup Playoffs)	0	5 (Note: Appearances in CONCACAF Champions Cup)	0	—		35	0
New York City FC	2023	Major League Soccer	26	0	—		1	0	—		—		3 (Note: Appearances in Leagues Cup)	0	30	0
New York City FC	2024	Major League Soccer	31	0	—		—		4 (Note: Appearances in MLS Cup Playoffs)	1	—		5 (Note: Appearances in Leagues Cup)	0	40	1
New York City FC	2025	Major League Soccer	31	1	—		0	0	5	0	—		0	0	36	1
New York City FC	2026	Major League Soccer	26	0	—		2	1	—		—		0	0	28	1
New York City FC	Total		140	1	—		4	1	7	1	5	0	8	0	169	3
Career total			304	6	25	1	14	2	18	1	18	1	9	0	393	11

== Honours ==
Palmeiras

- Campeonato Brasileiro Série B: 2013
- Campeonato Brasileiro Série A: 2016

Yokohama F. Marinos

- J1 League: 2019

New York City FC

- Campeones Cup: 2022

Individual

- J.League Best XI: 2019
- MLS All-Star: 2024
