= Keaton Parks =

American soccer player (born 1997)

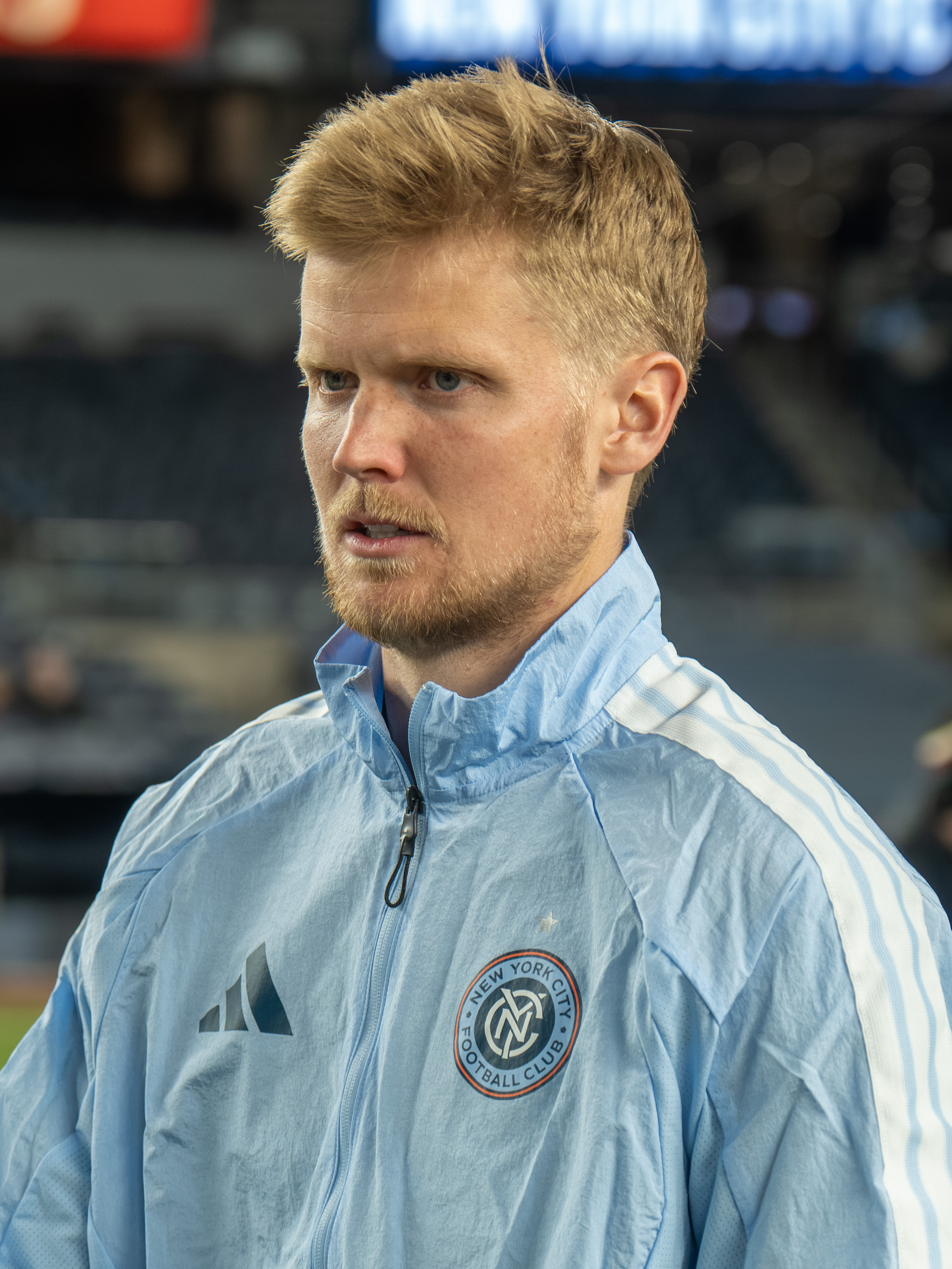
- Parks with New York City FC in 2026

Personal information
- Full name: Keaton Alexander Parks
- Date of birth: August 6, 1997 (age 29)
- Place of birth: Plano, Texas, United States
- Height: 6 ft 3 in (1.91 m)
- Position: Midfielder

Team information
- Current team: New York City FC
- Number: 55

Youth career
- 2014–2015: Liverpool Warriors
- 2015–2016: Varzim

Senior career*
Years	Team	Apps	(Gls)
2015–2016	Varzim B	4	(0)
2016–2017	Varzim	10	(2)
2017–2019	Benfica B	42	(7)
2017–2020	Benfica	4	(0)
2019	→ New York City FC (loan)	22	(1)
2020–	New York City FC	171	(16)

International career^{‡}
2019	United States U23	2	(0)
2018	United States	1	(0)
- * Club domestic league appearances and goals as of November 14, 2026 ‡ National team caps and goals as of May 28, 2018

Keaton Alexander Parks (born August 6, 1997) is an American professional soccer player who plays as a midfielder for Major League Soccer club New York City FC.

== Club career ==
Born in Plano, Texas, Parks played soccer three years with Liberty High School in Frisco before joining NPSL side Liverpool Warriors. With the help of his coach, Parks managed to trial at several Portuguese clubs such as Benfica, Braga and Sporting CP. While playing with the Warriors during a tournament in Póvoa de Varzim, Parks was scouted and signed with Varzim. In signing for Varzim, Parks rejected an offer to attend Southern Methodist University and play for their soccer team.

=== Varzim ===
After playing for Varzim's reserve side for a season, Parks made his professional debut for the club in a LigaPro match on September 4, 2016, against Aves. He came on as an 83rd-minute substitute for Diego Barcelos as Varzim lost 2–0. Parks then established himself as a regular starter for the side and then scored his first two professional goals during two matches. The first goal came on December 17, 2016, against Famalicão. His 52nd-minute strike was the first of two as Varzim won 2–0. His second goal came in the next match on December 21 against Fafe. His 69th-minute goal was the equalizer for Varzim as they eventually won the match 2–1.

On July 25, 2017, Parks signed with Portuguese champions Benfica, joining its reserve team in LigaPro. His first appearance for the senior team came in the 71st minute of the fourth round of the Taça de Portugal, against Vitória in November that year. Later, on December 6, Parks signed a new contract with Benfica, keeping him at the club until 2022.

On January 19, 2019, Parks joined Major League Soccer side New York City FC on loan until the end of their 2019 season. The deal to New York City FC was made permanent by the club on January 8, 2020.

== International career ==
Parks has been involved with the United States national under-20 team, attending a training camp in London in April 2017. He received his first senior call-up for a friendly against Bolivia on May 28, 2018, making his debut in that match as a 61st-minute substitute for Joe Corona.

== Career statistics ==
=== Club ===
As of match played October 6, 2024

Club	Season	League			National cup (Note: Includes Taça de Portugal and U.S. Open Cup)		League cup (Note: Includes Taça da Liga and MLS Cup Playoffs)		Continental		Other		Total	
Club	Season	Division	Apps	Goals	Apps	Goals	Apps	Goals	Apps	Goals	Apps	Goals	Apps	Goals
Varzim B	2015–16	Campeonato de Portugal	4	0	—		—		—		—		4	0
Varzim	2016–17	LigaPro	10	2	1	0	2	0	—		—		13	2
Benfica	2017–18	Primeira Liga	4	0	1	0	1	0	—		—		6	0
Benfica B	2017–18	LigaPro	29	7	—		—		—		—		29	7
Benfica B	2018–19	LigaPro	13	0	—		—		—		—		13	0
Benfica B	Total		60	9	2	0	3	0	—		—		65	9
New York City FC (loan)	2019	MLS	22	1	3	2	1	0	—		—		26	3
New York City FC	2020	MLS	23	3	—		1	0	3 (Note: Appearance(s) in CONCACAF Champions League)	0	1 (Note: One appearance in MLS is Back Tournament knockout stage)	0	28	3
New York City FC	2021	MLS	31	4	—		—		—		1 (Note: Appearance(s) in Leagues Cup)	0	32	4
New York City FC	2022	MLS	18	2	2	0	3	0	6	0	1 (Note: Appearance in Campeones Cup)	0	30	2
New York City FC	2023	MLS	32	2	—		—		—		3	0	35	2
New York City FC	2024	MLS	32	2	—		4	0	—		4	0	40	2
New York City FC	2025	MLS	0	0	—		0	0	—		0	0	0	0
New York City FC	Total		158	14	5	2	9	0	9	0	10	0	191	16
Career total			218	23	7	2	12	0	9	0	10	0	256	25

=== International ===
As of match played May 28, 2018

Appearances and goals by national team and year
National team	Year	Apps	Goals
United States	2018	1	0
Total		1	0

== Honors ==
New York City FC

- MLS Cup: 2021
- Campeones Cup: 2022
