= Justin Haak =

American soccer player (born 2001)

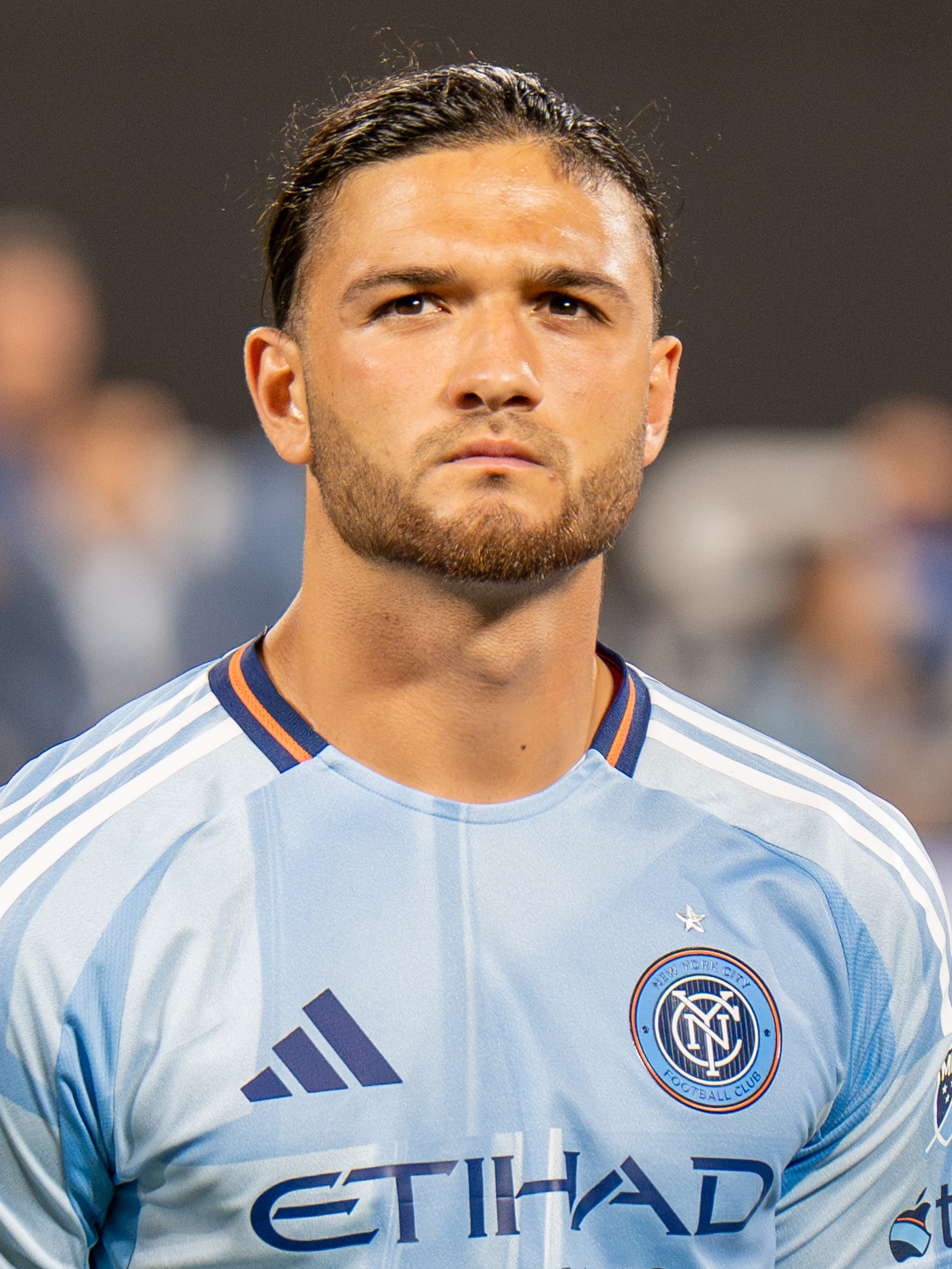
- Haak with New York City FC in 2025

Personal information
- Date of birth: September 12, 2001 (age 25)
- Place of birth: Brooklyn, New York, US
- Height: 6 ft 0 in (1.83 m)
- Position: Defensive midfielder

Team information
- Current team: LA Galaxy
- Number: 15

Youth career
- 2015–2019: New York City FC

Senior career*
Years	Team	Apps	(Gls)
2019–2025	New York City FC	51	(1)
2020	→ Hartford Athletic (loan)	7	(1)
2021	→ Hartford Athletic (loan)	16	(0)
2022–2023	→ New York City FC II (loan)	6	(1)
2026–	LA Galaxy	0	(0)

International career^{‡}
2018–2019	United States U18	3	(0)
2019	United States U20	1	(0)
- * Club domestic league appearances and goals as of March 15, 2025 ‡ National team caps and goals as of September 21, 2020

Justin Haak (born September 12, 2001) is an American professional soccer player who plays as a defensive midfielder for Major League Soccer club LA Galaxy.

== Early life ==
Haak attended Tompkins Square Middle School from 2012 to 2015 and the High School for Environmental Studies in New York City from 2015 to 2019. While attending he played for NYCFC's Academy.

== Club career ==
=== New York City FC ===
==== 2019: Debut season ====
On January 24, 2019, Haak signed as a Homegrown Player with Major League Soccer side New York City FC.

Haak made his professional debut on June 4, 2019, appearing as an 86th-minute substitute during a 5–2 win against FC Cincinnati.

==== 2020–21: Loan spells at Hartford Athletic ====
On September 9, 2020, Haak joined USL Championship side Hartford Athletic on loan from New York City for the rest of the 2020 season. On September 17, Haak scored his first professional goal in Hartford's 3–1 victory over New York Red Bulls II. On August 16, 2021, Haak rejoined Hartford Athletic on loan for the remainder of their 2021 season.

Following the 2022 season, Haak's contract with NYCFC expired, but he re-signed with the club ahead of the 2023 season.

=== LA Galaxy ===
At the end of the season, Haak's contract expired again, and although the team negotiated his return he signed with LA Galaxy on December 29, 2025.

== Career statistics ==
=== Club ===
As of match played 28 October, 2025

Appearances and goals by club, season and competition
Club	Season	League			Playoffs		National cup		Continental		Other		Total	
Club	Season	Division	Apps	Goals	Apps	Goals	Apps	Goals	Apps	Goals	Apps	Goals	Apps	Goals
New York City FC	2019	Major League Soccer	3	0	0	0	3	0	—		—		6	0
New York City FC	2020	Major League Soccer	0	0	0	0	—		—		—		0	0
New York City FC	2021	Major League Soccer	0	0	0	0	—		—		—		0	0
New York City FC	2022	Major League Soccer	15	0	2	0	2	0	1 (Note: Appearances in CONCACAF Champions Cup)	0	1 (Note: Appearance in Campeones Cup)	0	21	0
New York City FC	2023	Major League Soccer	14	1	0	0	1	0	—		3 (Note: Appearances in Leagues Cup)	0	18	1
New York City FC	2024	Major League Soccer	15	0	3	0	—		—		5	0	23	0
New York City FC	2025	Major League Soccer	35	1	0	0	—		—		—		35	1
New York City FC	Total		82	2	5	0	6	0	1	0	9	0	103	2
Hartford Athletic (loan)	2020	USL Championship	7	1	1	0	—		—		0	0	8	1
Hartford Athletic (loan)	2021	USL Championship	16	0	0	0	—		—		—		16	0
Hartford Athletic (loan)	Total		23	1	1	0	—		—		0	0	24	1
New York City FC II (loan)	2022	MLS Next Pro	6	1	0	0	—		—		—		6	1
LA Galaxy	2026	Major League Soccer	0	0	—		—		0	0	0	0	0	0
Career total			111	4	6	0	6	0	1	0	9	0	133	4

== Honors ==
New York City FC

- Campeones Cup: 2022
