= Tayvon Gray =

Jamaican footballer (born 2002)

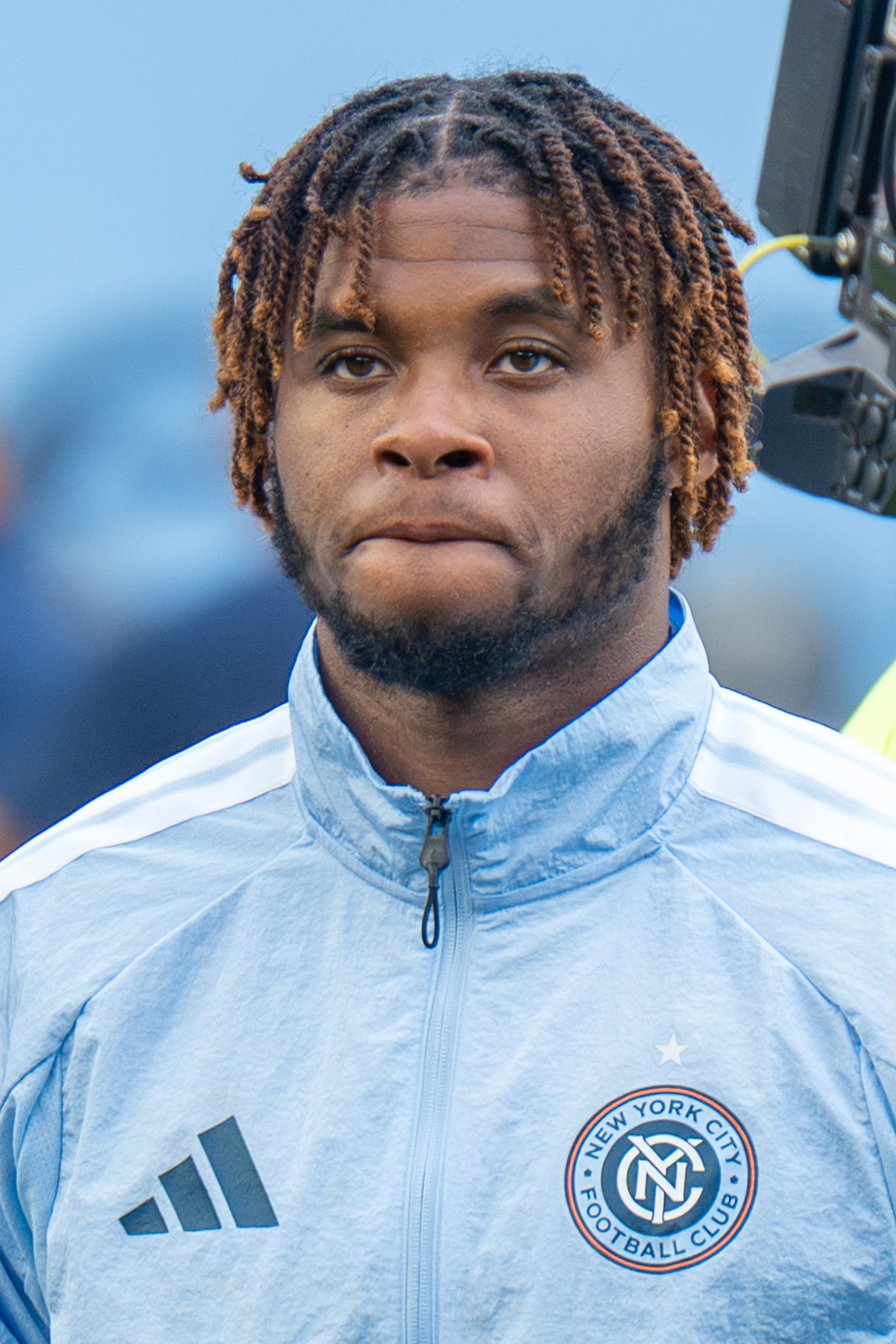
- Gray with New York City FC in 2026

Personal information
- Full name: Tayvon Howard Gray
- Date of birth: August 19, 2002 (age 24)
- Place of birth: The Bronx, New York, United States
- Height: 5 ft 11 in (1.80 m)
- Position: Right-back

Team information
- Current team: New York City FC
- Number: 24

Youth career
- –2012: SDFC Gunners
- 2012–2017: Cedar Stars Academy
- 2017–2020: New York City FC

Senior career*
Years	Team	Apps	(Gls)
2020–	New York City FC	131	(2)
2025–	New York City FC II	2	(0)

International career^{‡}
2018–2019	United States U17	18	(0)
2023–	Jamaica	9	(0)
Medal record
Men's football
Representing Jamaica
CONCACAF Nations League
Bronze medal – third place	2024 United States	Team
- * Club domestic league appearances and goals as of October 27, 2024 ‡ National team caps and goals as of November 18, 2024

Tayvon Howard Gray (born August 19, 2002) is a professional footballer who plays as a right-back for Major League Soccer club New York City FC. Born in the United States, he plays for the Jamaica national team.

== Early life ==
Gray was born in The Bronx, New York. He attended high school in Hackensack High School and Alexander Hamilton High School, while also playing club soccer at Soccer Domain FC Gunners. At just nine years old, Gray had trials with Fulham and Tottenham Hotspur. He later joined the Cedar Stars academy. In 2017, Gray joined the New York City FC academy. He is of Jamaican descent.

== Club career ==
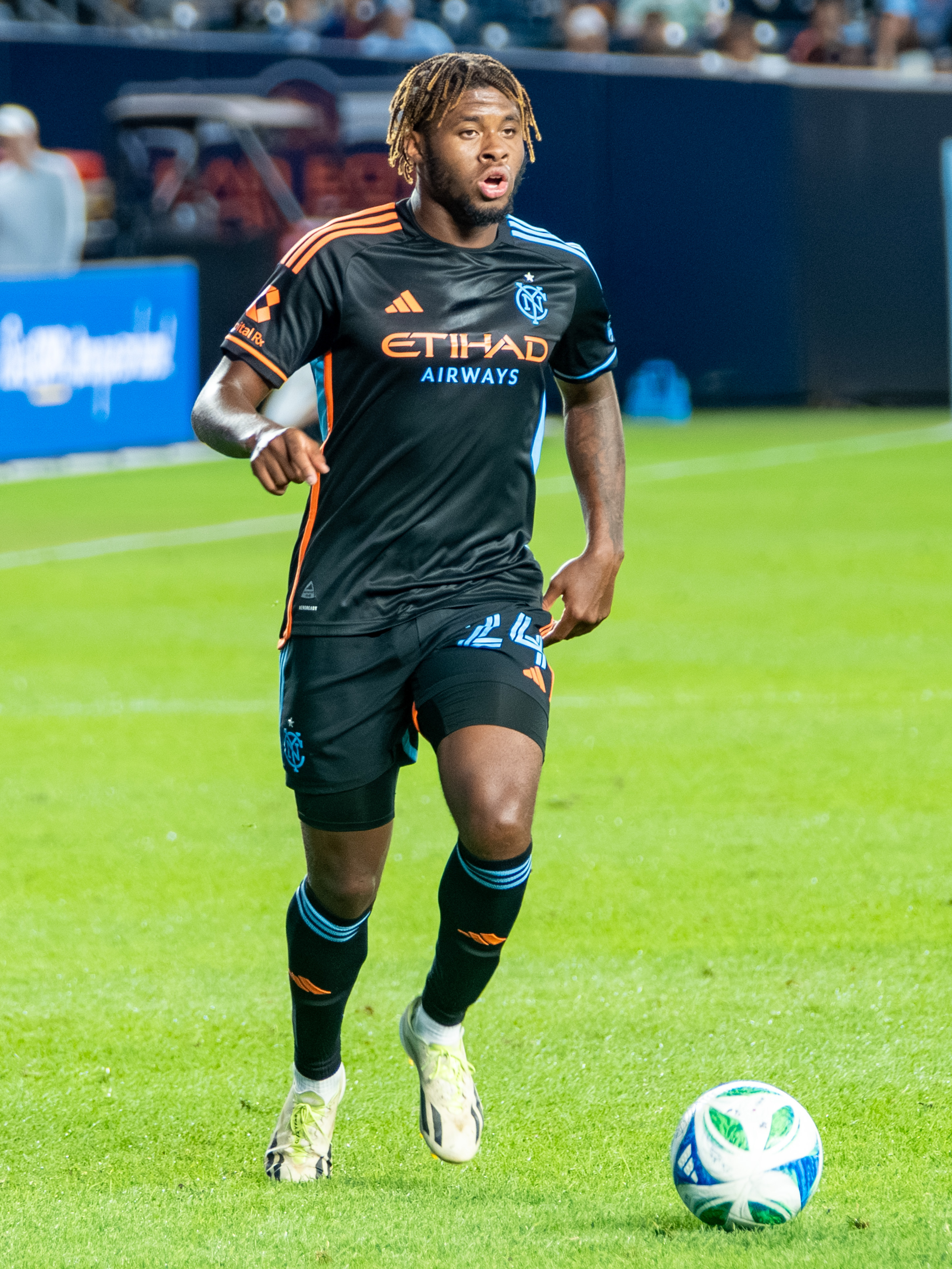
Tayvon Gray in 2025

=== New York City ===
On November 26, 2019, Gray signed as a homegrown player with Major League Soccer side New York City FC ahead of the 2020 season. This made him the first Bronx native to play for New York City FC. He made the bench three times during the 2020 MLS season but did not make an appearance. He made his professional debut on April 24, 2021, appearing as an 83rd-minute substitute during a 5–0 win over FC Cincinnati. Gray consistently made the bench in the first part of the season and made his continental competition debut in a start in the quarterfinals of the 2021 Leagues Cup, playing 88 minutes in the match that NYCFC lost on penalties to UNAM Pumas. After Anton Tinnerholm, NYCFC's, starting right back, tore his achilles tendon in a match against Nashville SC on October 10, Gray was able to establish himself as a consistent presence in the lineup. He ended the 2021 season with 10 appearances, 375 minutes, and one assist. He then went on to start in all four a NYCFC's playoff matches, playing every minute and recording an assist in their run to the 2021 MLS Cup.

Gray made his CONCACAF Champions League debut in NYCFC's first match of 2022, playing in a 2–0 win against Costa Rican side Santos de Guápiles.

== International career ==
=== United States ===
Gray has represented the United States at the under-17 level.

=== Jamaica ===
In September 2023, Gray was called up to the Jamaica senior national team for CONCACAF Nations League matches versus Honduras and Haiti. He made his debut on September 8 against Honduras.

== Career statistics ==
=== Club ===
As of Matches played 16 May 2026

Appearances and goals by club, season, and competition
Club	Season	League			National cup		Playoffs		Continental		Other		Total	
Club	Season	Division	Apps	Goals	Apps	Goals	Apps	Goals	Apps	Goals	Apps	Goals	Apps	Goals
New York City FC	2020	MLS	0	0	—		—		—		—		0	0
New York City FC	2021	MLS	10	0	—		4	0	—		1 (Note: Appearance(s) in Leagues Cup)	0	15	0
New York City FC	2022	MLS	27	0	2	0	—		4 (Note: Appearances in CONCACAF Champions League)	0	1 (Note: Appearance in Campeones Cup)	0	34	0
New York City FC	2023	MLS	28	0	1	0	—		—		3	0	32	0
New York City FC	2024	MLS	27	1	0	0	1	0	—		5	0	34	1
New York City FC	2025	MLS	26	0	1	0	5	0	—		3	0	34	0
New York City FC	2026	MLS	13	1	2	0	—		—		—		15	1
New York City FC	Total		131	2	6	0	10	0	4	0	13	0	164	2
Career total			131	2	6	0	10	0	4	0	13	0	164	2

=== International ===
As of match played 18 November 2024

National team	Year	Apps	Goals
Jamaica	2023	3	0
Jamaica	2024	6	0
Total		9	0

== Honours ==
New York City FC

- MLS Cup: 2021
- Campeones Cup: 2022
