= Mitja Ilenič =

Slovenian footballer (born 2004)

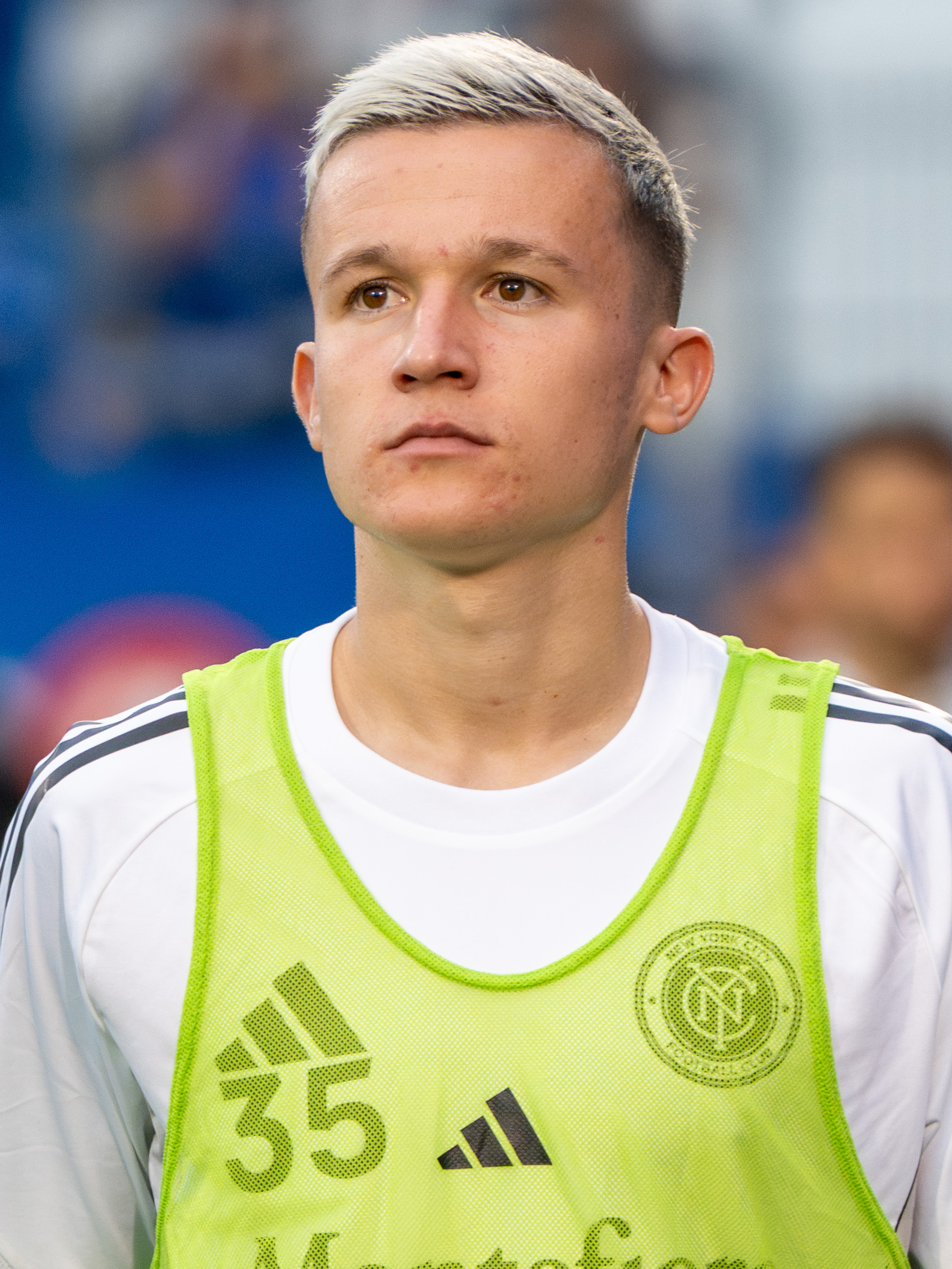
- Ilenič with New York City FC in 2025

Personal information
- Date of birth: 26 December 2004 (age 21)
- Place of birth: Slovenia
- Height: 1.80 m (5 ft 11 in)
- Position: Right-back

Team information
- Current team: New York City FC
- Number: 35

Youth career
- 2011–2016: NK Bela Krajina
- 2016–2019: NŠ Bela Krajina
- 2019–2021: Domžale

Senior career*
| Years | Team | Apps | (Gls) |
| 2021–2023 | Domžale | 32 | (3) |
| 2023– | New York City FC | 64 | (3) |
| 2026 | → Raków Częstochowa (loan) | 5 | (0) |

International career
| 2020 | Slovenia U17 | 1 | (0) |
| 2021–2022 | Slovenia U18 | 3 | (1) |
| 2022–2023 | Slovenia U19 | 6 | (0) |
| 2022–2026 | Slovenia U21 | 24 | (2) |
| 2024 | Slovenia | 1 | (0) |
- * Club domestic league appearances and goals as of 19:13, 29 May 2026 (UTC)

Mitja Ilenič (born 26 December 2004) is a Slovenian professional footballer who plays as a right-back for Major League Soccer club New York City FC.

== Club career ==
=== Early career ===
Ilenič started his football career in 2011, at the age of six, with Bela Krajina, and then joined Domžale in the summer of 2019. He initially played as a forward, but later moved to the position of right-back when he was still a youngster. He signed his first professional contract with Domžale at the age of sixteen, and made his Slovenian PrvaLiga debut on 22 May 2021 against Aluminij, in the final round of the 2020–21 season.

In October 2022, Ilenič extended his contract with Domžale until 2025. Throughout 2022, he established himself in the club's starting eleven, as he attracted the interest of several foreign clubs, including Sturm Graz, Hellas Verona, Lugano, Sparta Prague and New York City FC.

=== New York City FC ===
On 4 January 2023, Ilenič joined Major League Soccer club New York City FC on a permanent deal, signing a contract until 2026, with an option for another year.

==== Loan to Raków Częstochowa ====
On 17 January 2026, Ilenič moved to Polish Ekstraklasa club Raków Częstochowa on a one-year loan with an option to buy.

== International career ==
Ilenič represented Slovenia at all youth international levels from under-17 to under-21. He made his debut for the under-21 team on 25 March 2022, starting the match and playing the full 90 minutes in a goalless draw against Kosovo in the qualification round of the 2023 UEFA European Under-21 Championship. At the age of 17 years, two months and 27 days, he became the second youngest player to ever represent the team, behind only Jan Oblak.

He made his debut for the senior team on 20 January 2024 in a friendly against the United States.

== Career statistics ==
=== Club ===
As of match played 23 May 2026

Appearances and goals by club, season and competition
| Club | Season | League | | | National cup (Note: Includes Slovenian Cup, Polish Cup) | | Continental | | Other | | Total | |
| Club | Season | Division | Apps | Goals | Apps | Goals | Apps | Goals | Apps | Goals | Apps | Goals |
|---|---|---|---|---|---|---|---|---|---|---|---|---|
| Domžale | 2020–21 | 1. SNL | 1 | 0 | 0 | 0 | — | | — | | 1 | 0 |
| Domžale | 2021–22 | 1. SNL | 15 | 3 | 1 | 0 | 0 | 0 | — | | 16 | 3 |
| Domžale | 2022–23 | 1. SNL | 16 | 0 | 0 | 0 | — | | — | | 16 | 0 |
| Domžale | Total | | 32 | 3 | 1 | 0 | 0 | 0 | — | | 33 | 3 |
| New York City FC | 2023 | MLS | 22 | 0 | 0 | 0 | — | | 2 (Note: Appearances in Leagues Cup) | 0 | 24 | 0 |
| New York City FC | 2024 | MLS | 23 | 1 | — | | — | | 6 (Note: Three appearances in Leagues Cup, three appearances in MLS Cup playoffs) | 0 | 29 | 1 |
| New York City FC | 2025 | MLS | 19 | 2 | 0 | 0 | — | | 3 (Note: Two appearances in Leagues Cup, one appearance in MLS Cup playoffs) | 0 | 22 | 2 |
| New York City FC | Total | | 64 | 3 | 0 | 0 | — | | 11 | 0 | 75 | 3 |
| Raków Częstochowa (loan) | 2025–26 | Ekstraklasa | 5 | 0 | 1 | 0 | 0 | 0 | — | | 6 | 0 |
| Career total | | | 101 | 6 | 2 | 0 | 0 | 0 | 11 | 0 | 114 | 6 |

=== International ===
As of match played 20 January 2024

Appearances and goals by national team and year
| National team | Year | Apps | Goals |
|---|---|---|---|
| Slovenia | 2024 | 1 | 0 |
| Total | | 1 | 0 |
