= Malachi Jones (footballer) =

Sierra Leonean footballer (born 2003)

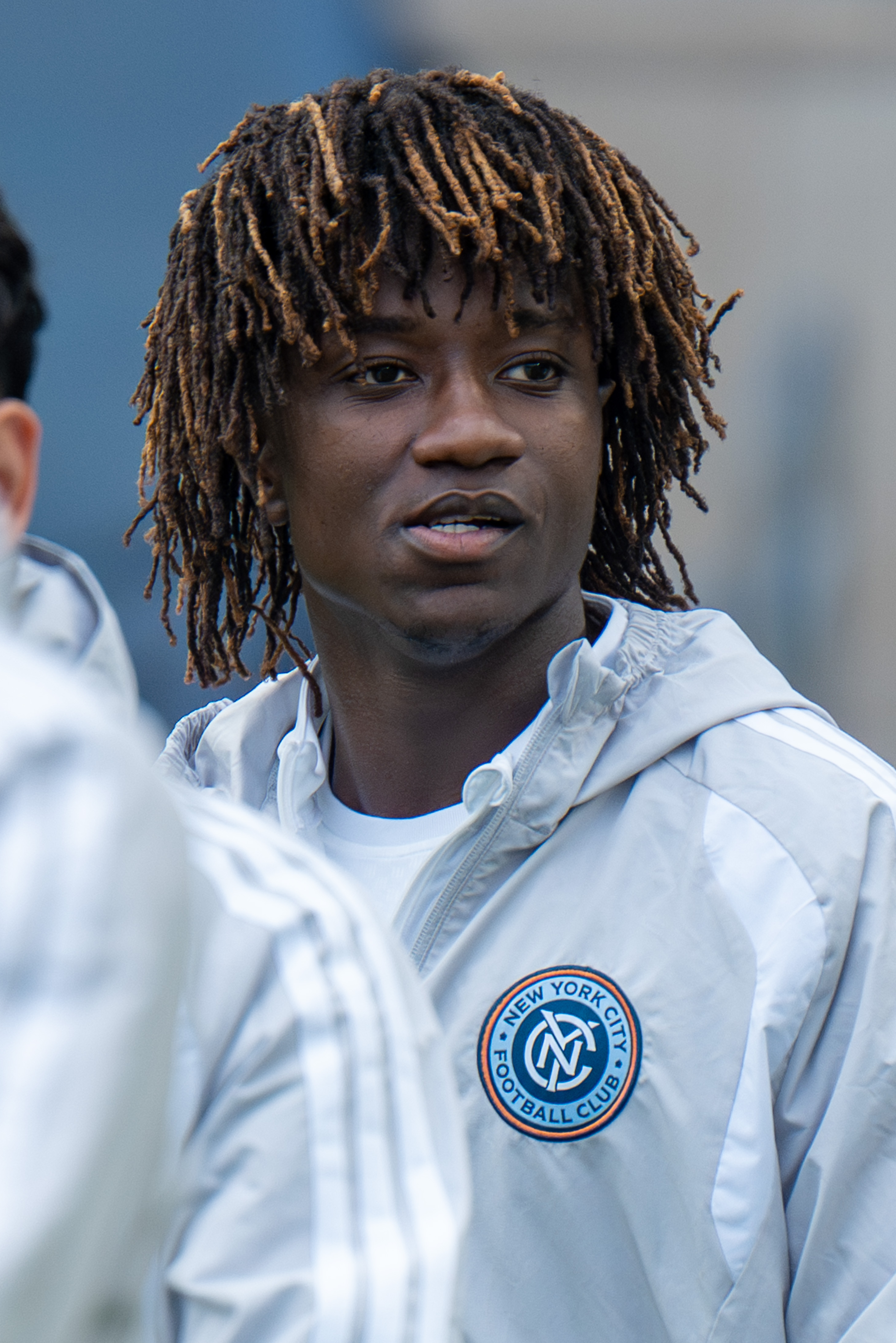
- Jones with NYCFC in 2026

Personal information
- Date of birth: 23 September 2003 (age 23)
- Place of birth: Freetown, Sierra Leone
- Height: 5 ft 10 in (1.78 m)
- Position: Forward

Team information
- Current team: New York City FC
- Number: 88

Youth career
- Nashville United SA

College career
| Years | Team | Apps | (Gls) |
| 2022–2023 | Lipscomb Bisons | 35 | (12) |

Senior career*
| Years | Team | Apps | (Gls) |
| 2023 | Tennessee SC | | |
| 2024– | New York City FC | 14 | (1) |
| 2024– | → New York City FC II (loan) | 1 | (0) |
- * Club domestic league appearances and goals as of 28 June 2024

Malachi Jones (born 23 September 2003) is a Sierra Leonean professional footballer who plays for Major League Soccer club New York City FC.

== Early life ==
Jones was born in Freetown, Sierra Leone. In 2013, he moved to the United States from Sierra Leone, along with his seven siblings, after they were all adopted by an American family (as the siblings were orphans) from Thompson's Station, Tennessee. There, he played youth soccer with Nashville United Soccer Academy.

Jones attended Grace Christian Academy in Tennessee. He led the Lions to a Division I State Title in 2019, a Division II State Runner Up in 2021, and capped off his high school career with a Division II State Title in 2022.

In June 2022, he was named the Tennessee Gatorade Player of the Year. He was a four-time First Team All-State selection and helped them win the Division II, Class A soccer state championship in 2022.

== College career ==
In November 2021, he committed to attend Lipscomb University to play for the men's soccer team in the fall of 2022. On 25 August 2022, he made his collegiate debut against the Purdue Fort Wayne Mastodons. On 10 September 2022, he scored his first collegiate goal in a victory over the Jacksonville Dolphins.

On 4 October 2022, he scored a brace in a 3–1 victory over the Mercer Bears, earning ASUN and TSWA Player of the Week honors. At the end of his freshman season, he was named to the ASUN All-Freshman Tea, the All-ASUN Conference First Team, and a College Soccer News Third Team All-Freshman.

Ahead of his sophomore season in 2023, he was named to the ASUN All-Preseason Team. In the season opener, he scored a brace in a loss against the Florida Atlantic Owls. In the first week of September, he was named the ASUN Player of the Week and also named to the TopDrawerSoccer National Team of the Week. At the end of the season, he was named to the All-ASUN First Team and the All-Region First Team. He led the ASUN Conference in assists in 2023. He chose to depart the school after his sophomore season to turn professional.

== Club career ==
In 2023, he played with Tennessee SC in USL League Two.

At the 2024 MLS SuperDraft, Jones was selected in the first round (8th overall) by New York City FC. In January 2024, he signed a two-year contract with the club, with club options for 2026 and 2027. Jones began his career quickly for New York City, making 14 appearances in the season's first 20 games, including 4 starts, often ahead of players signed for a substantial transfer fee. He scored his first Major League Soccer goal on 11 May 2024 in a 3–2 victory over Toronto FC and finished the season with one goal and three assists.

On 28 June 2024, Jones broke his right tibia and fibula in a collision with Orlando City goalkeeper Mason Stajduhar, who also suffered a broken tibia and fibula. The injury occurred as Jones was played in behind the defense and used his considerable pace to chase the ball, with Jones and Stajduhar arriving simultaneously. While Jones was able to reach the sideline with assistance, Stajduhar had to be taken off the pitch in a cart, with the game being delayed over ten minutes.

On 1 July 2024, New York City announced that Jones had undergone surgery to repair both breaks. On 18 March 2025, New York City announced that Jones had undergone additional surgery on his right tibia. As of 4 September 2025, Jones was still working his way back to fitness and had not made another appearance in a match.

== Personal life ==
In June 2024, Jones got engaged to his long-time girlfriend, Delaney Smith. The pair met at Lipscomb University, where she played libero for the Bison’s volleyball team. Smith is the Atlantic Sun Conference’s all-time record holder for career aces and finished her career with over 1000 digs. She was named the 2023 ASUN Academic Volleyball Player of the Year and went on to earn a graduate degree from Vanderbilt University. The duo wed on May 25, 2025.

Malachi is the older brother of Isaiah Jones (footballer, born 2006) who currently plays for Chattanooga FC.

== Career statistics ==
As of 28 June 2024

| Club | Season | League | | | Playoffs | | Domestic Cup | | Continental | | Total | |
| Club | Season | Division | Apps | Goals | Apps | Goals | Apps | Goals | Apps | Goals | Apps | Goals |
|---|---|---|---|---|---|---|---|---|---|---|---|---|
| New York City FC | 2024 | Major League Soccer | 14 | 1 | 0 | 0 | – | | – | | 14 | 1 |
| New York City FC II (loan) | 2024 | MLS Next Pro | 1 | 0 | 0 | 0 | 1 | 1 | – | | 2 | 1 |
| Career total | | | 15 | 1 | 0 | 0 | 1 | 1 | 0 | 0 | 16 | 2 |
