= Agustín Ojeda (footballer, born 2004) =

Argentine footballer (born 2004)

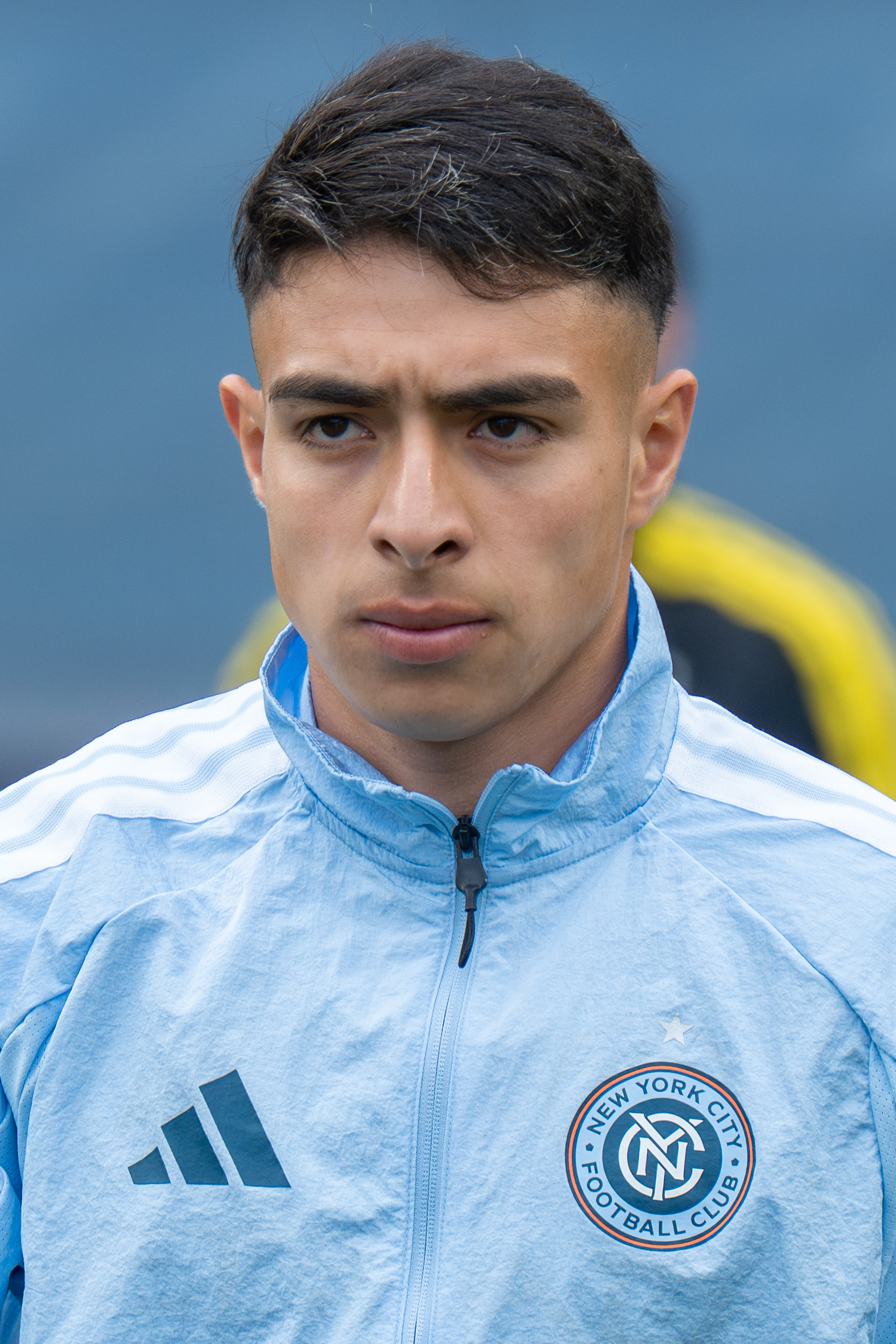
- Ojeda in 2026 with New York City FC

Personal information
- Full name: Axel Agustín Ojeda
- Date of birth: 19 June 2004 (age 22)
- Place of birth: Rosario, Santa Fe, Argentina
- Height: 1.69 m (5 ft 7 in)
- Position: Winger

Team information
- Current team: New York City
- Number: 26

Youth career
- 2015–2022: Racing

Senior career*
Years	Team	Apps	(Gls)
2022–2024	Racing	5	(1)
2024–	New York City	22	(3)

International career
2019	Argentina U15		
- Argentina U17
2021–	Argentina U20		
- * Club domestic league appearances and goals as of 17:25, 12 January 2025 (UTC)

Axel Agustín Ojeda (born 19 June 2004) is an Argentine professional footballer who plays as a winger for Major League Soccer club New York City FC.

== Early life ==
Ojeda was born in Rosario in the Santa Fe Province of Argentina, and raised in the neighbourhood of Tablada, one of the most dangerous areas of the city.

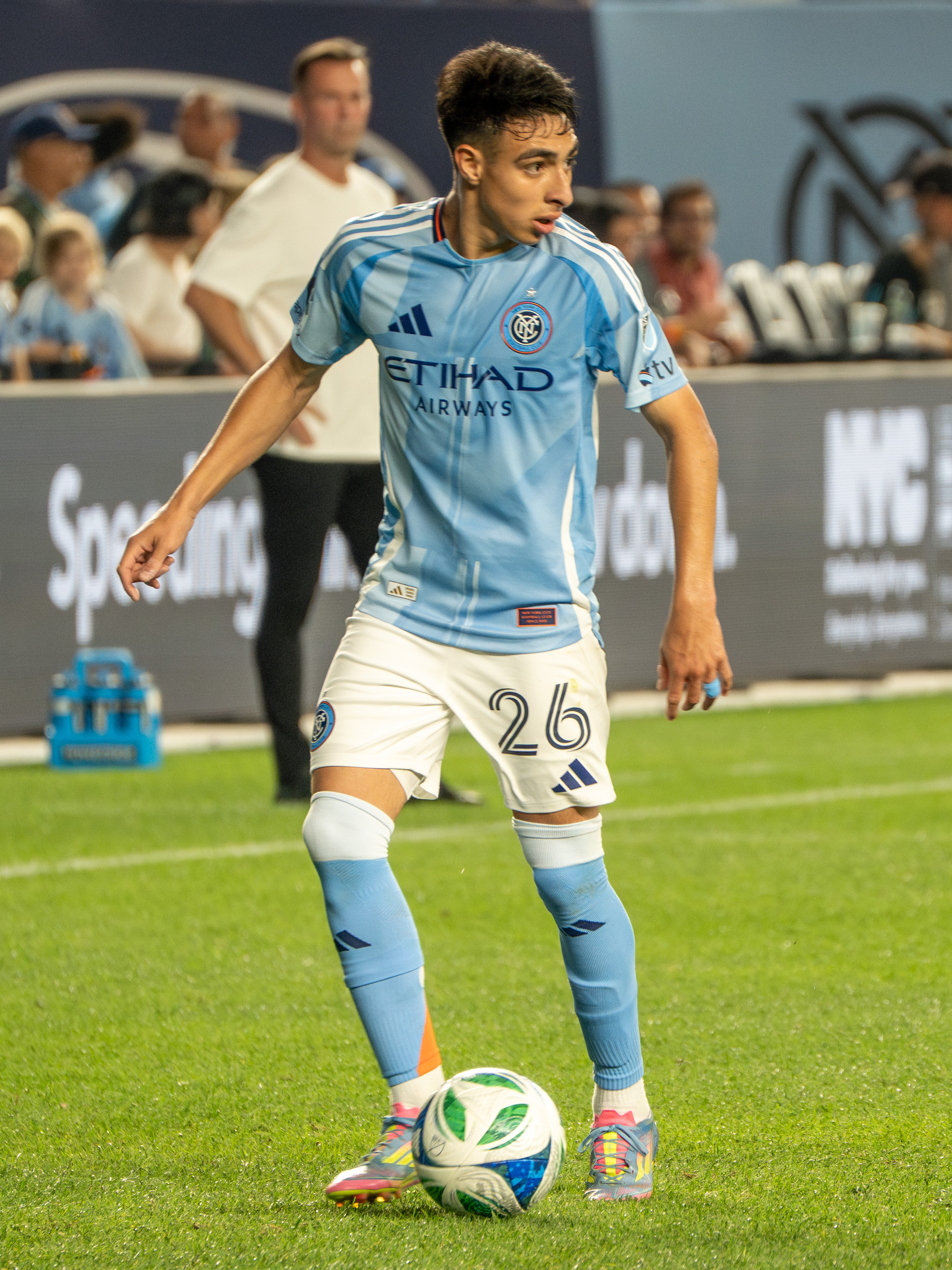
Agustín Ojeda during New York City FC vs Atlanta United in 2025

== Club career ==
Ojeda was spotted by Racing scout Jorge García in 2015, while García was on a scouting assignment in Rosario. García had initially gone to watch local team Alianza Sport, but Ojeda, as well as teammate Lautaro Ronchi, who were both playing for the opposition side, caught his eye. Despite receiving interest from Newell's Old Boys and Rosario Central, he eventually joined the academy of Racing.

Having progressed through the academy, he was called up to the first team by manager Fernando Gago ahead of a Copa de la Liga Profesional fixture against Atlético Tucumán on 14 March 2022, and made his professional debut for the club in the 4–0 away win when he replaced Enzo Copetti late in the second half. Following the game, Ojeda would not feature for the first team again, with Gago stating in August 2023 that Ojeda had made a "mistake", and was sent to train with the reserves. It was later reported that Ojeda had arrived late to training on more than one occasion, hence his demotion.

The following season, he was handed his first start by Gago, and repaid his manager's trust with his first goal in professional football against Central Córdoba on 24 July 2023. Playing on the left wing, he latched on to a through-ball from Tomás Avilés before placing the ball underneath goalkeeper Matías Mansilla to make the score 2–0 in Racing's eventual 3–1 victory.

On 10 August 2023, Ojeda was named as a starter again ahead of Racing's Copa Libertadores tie against Colombian opposition Atlético Nacional. Five minutes into the second half, with the score 1–0 in Racing's favour, Ojeda doubled his side's advantage; dribbling from the right wing into the penalty area, he slid the ball under goalkeeper Harlen Castillo as Racing went on to win 3–0.

On 2 February 2024, Ojeda signed with Major League Soccer side New York City on a five-year deal for an undisclosed transfer fee.

== International career ==
Ojeda has represented Argentina at under-15, under-17 and under-20 level.

== Career statistics ==
=== Club ===
As of match played 23 November 2024

Appearances and goals by club, season and competition
Club	Season	League			National cup		League cup		Continental		Other		Total	
Club	Season	Division	Apps	Goals	Apps	Goals	Apps	Goals	Apps	Goals	Apps	Goals	Apps	Goals
Racing	2022	Argentine Primera División	0	0	0	0	1 (Note: Appearance(s) in the Copa de la Liga Profesional)	0	0	0	—		1	0
Racing	2023	Argentine Primera División	5	1	2 (Note: Appearances in the Copa Argentina)	0	11	1	5 (Note: Appearances in the Copa Libertadores)	1	0	0	23	3
Racing	Total		5	1	2	0	12	1	5	1	0	0	24	3
New York City FC	2024	Major League Soccer	22	3	1 (Note: Appearance(s) in the U.S. Open Cup)	0	1 (Note: Appearance(s) in the MLS Cup Playoffs)	0	—		2 (Note: Appearance(s) in the Leagues Cup)	0	26	3
Career total			27	4	3	0	13	1	5	1	2	0	50	6
