= Christian McFarlane =

English footballer (born 2007)

Personal information
- Full name: Christian Hector McFarlane
- Date of birth: 25 January 2007 (age 19)
- Place of birth: Brentwood, England
- Position: Left-back

Team information
- Current team: Leicester City (on loan from Manchester City)
- Number: 18

Youth career
- 2014–2018: JIGS Soccer Academy
- 2018–2022: New York City FC

Senior career*
Years	Team	Apps	(Gls)
2021–2025	New York City FC II	29	(0)
2021–2025	New York City FC	8	(0)
2025–	Manchester City	0	(0)
2026–	→ Leicester City (loan)	0	(0)

International career^{‡}
2022	England U16	5	(0)
2023	United States U16	3	(0)
2023–2024	England U17	13	(1)
2024	England U18	2	(0)
2025–	England U19	4	(0)
- * Club domestic league appearances and goals as of 16:30, 9 October 2024 (UTC) ‡ National team caps and goals as of 12:37, 16 April 2026 (UTC)

Christian Hector McFarlane (born 25 January 2007) is an English professional footballer who plays as a left-back for League One club Leicester City, on loan from Premier League club Manchester City.

== Early life ==
Christian Hector McFarlane was born on 25 January 2007 in Brentwood, England. He moved to the United States at the age of three and grew up in Queens, New York. He is of Jamaican descent.

== Club career ==
=== New York City FC ===
A youth product of the JIGS Soccer Academy, McFarlane moved to the New York City FC youth academy in 2018 and worked his way up their youth categories. On 16 September 2021, at the age of 14 years and seven months, he signed his first professional contract with New York City FC. In doing so he was the third youngest player to sign a Major League Soccer contract. He was promoted to New York City FC II and made his senior and professional debut with them as a half-time substitute in a 2–1 win over Inter Miami CF II on 29 May 2022.

=== Manchester City ===
On 27 January 2025, McFarlane was sold by New York City to fellow City Football Group club, Manchester City.

==== Leicester City (loan) ====
On 29 July 2026, McFarlane joined Leicester City on loan from Manchester City for the 2026–27 season.

== International career ==
McFarlane is eligible to represent England, the United States, or Jamaica. He was called up to a training camp for the United States under-16s in August 2022. He represented England under-16 in a set of friendlies in November 2022. He was called up to a training camp with the United States U17s in January 2023 in preparation for the 2023 CONCACAF U-17 Championship. He was called up to the United States under-16s for the 2023 U-16 International Dream Cup.

On 6 September 2023, McFarlane made his England U17 debut during a 3–2 defeat to Portugal at the Pinatar Arena. On 20 May 2024, McFarlane was included in the England squad for the 2024 UEFA European Under-17 Championship. He started three of their four games at the tournament including the quarter-final elimination against Italy.

On 4 September 2024, McFarlane made his England U18 debut during a 2-2 draw with Portugal at the Lafarge Foot Avenir.

McFarlane made his U19 debut during a 2-0 win over Ukraine at Pinatar Arena on 3 September 2025.

== Career statistics ==
=== Club ===
As of match played 19 October 2024

Appearances and goals by club, season and competition
Club	Season	League			National cup (Note: Includes MLS Cup)		League Cup		Continental		Other		Total	
Club	Season	Division	Apps	Goals	Apps	Goals	Apps	Goals	Apps	Goals	Apps	Goals	Apps	Goals
New York City FC II	2022	MLS Next Pro	7	0	—		—		—		—		7	0
New York City FC II	2023	MLS Next Pro	20	0	—		—		—		—		20	0
New York City FC II	2024	MLS Next Pro	2	0	—		—		—		1 (Note: Appearance in MLS Next Pro Playoffs)	0	3	0
New York City FC II	Total		29	0	—		—		—		1	0	30	0
New York City FC	2023	MLS	0	0	—		—		—		0	0	0	0
New York City FC	2024	MLS	8	0	3	0	—		—		5 (Note: Appearances in Leagues Cup)	0	16	0
New York City FC	Total		8	0	3	0	—		—		5	0	16	0
Career total			37	0	3	0	0	0	0	0	6	0	46	0
