= Kevin O'Toole (soccer) =

American footballer (born 1998)

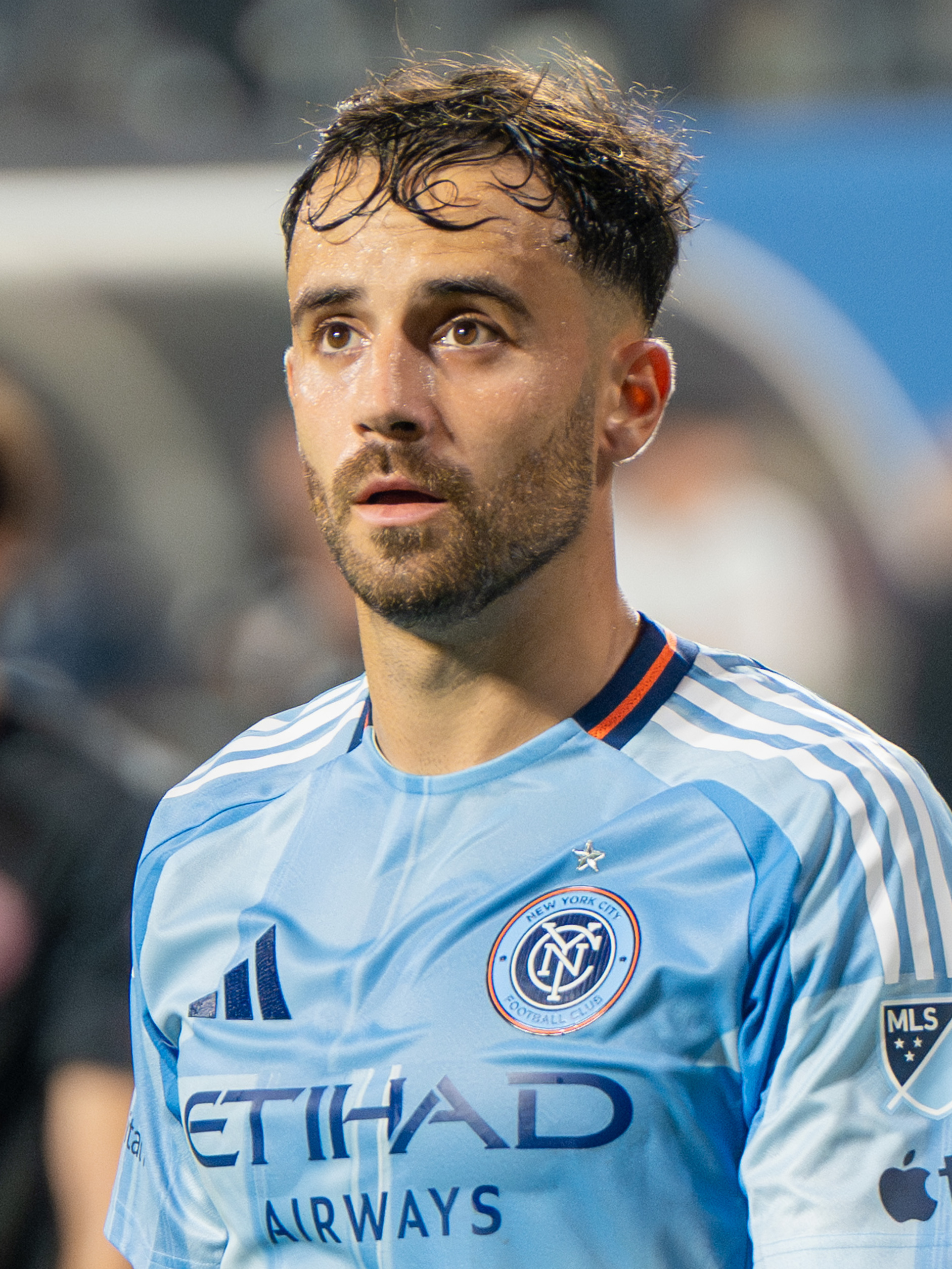
- O'Toole with New York City FC in 2025

Personal information
- Full name: Kevin William Nathaniel O'Toole
- Date of birth: 14 December 1998 (age 27)
- Place of birth: Montclair, New Jersey, U.S.
- Height: 5 ft 10 in (1.78 m)
- Position: Left-back

Team information
- Current team: New York City FC
- Number: 22

Youth career
- 2015–2016: New York Red Bulls

College career
Years	Team	Apps	(Gls)
2017–2021	Princeton Tigers	58	(15)

Senior career*
Years	Team	Apps	(Gls)
2016–2017	New York Red Bulls II	22	(1)
2018–2021	New York Red Bulls U-23	21	(0)
2022–	New York City FC	80	(2)
2022–2024	New York City FC II	103	(2)
- * Club domestic league appearances and goals as of 17 November 2025

Kevin William Nathaniel O'Toole (born 14 December 1998) is a professional footballer who plays as a left-back for Major League Soccer club New York City FC. Born in the United States, he is eligible to play for the Republic of Ireland national team.

== Club career ==
O'Toole is a member of the New York Red Bulls Academy. During the 2015/16 season he appeared in 2 matches for the U-17/18 team. He also appeared for United Soccer League side New York Red Bulls II in 2016, signing on an amateur contract.

O'Toole made his debut for the New York Red Bulls II in the summer of 2016 at the age of 17. He scored his first professional goal on July 23 in a 3–2 loss to Charleston Battery. On October 23, 2016, O'Toole helped the club to a 5–1 victory over Swope Park Rangers in the 2016 USL Cup Final, appearing as a starter in the cup final.

O'Toole was selected by New York City FC with the 34th overall pick in the 2022 MLS SuperDraft. On March 7, 2022, O'Toole officially signed with New York City FC.

== International career ==
He is eligible to play for the Republic of Ireland due to his Dublin-born grandfather - he has said he ''would be proud'' to represent Ireland internationally. He received his first call up to the Irish national team on 6 November 2025 from head coach Heimir Hallgrímsson for their 2026 FIFA World Cup qualification fixtures against Portugal and Hungary.

== Personal life ==
O'Toole's sister Jillian played for LOI Women's Premier Division club Treaty United.

== Career statistics ==
As of match played 24 November 2025

Appearances and goals by club, season, and competition
Club	Season	League			Playoffs		National cup		Continental		Other		Total	
Club	Season	Division	Apps	Goals	Apps	Goals	Apps	Goals	Apps	Goals	Apps	Goals	Apps	Goals
New York Red Bulls II	2016	USL	12	1	3	0	—		—		—		15	1
New York Red Bulls II	2017	USL	10	0	0	0	—		—		—		10	0
New York Red Bulls II	Total		22	1	3	0	—		—		—		25	1
New York Red Bulls U-23	2018	PDL	12	0	2	0	—		—		—		14	0
New York Red Bulls U-23	2019	USL2	6	0	0	0	—		—		—		6	0
New York Red Bulls U-23	Total		18	0	2	0	—		—		—		20	1
New York City FC	2022	MLS	3	0	3	0	1	0	0	0	1	0	8	0
New York City FC	2023	MLS	21	0	—		1	0	—		1	0	23	0
New York City FC	2024	MLS	30	1	4	0	—		—		2	0	36	1
New York City FC	2025	MLS	26	1	4	0	—		—		3	0	33	1
New York City FC	Total		80	2	11	0	2	0	0	0	7	0	100	2
New York City FC II	2022	MLS Next Pro	10	0	—		—		—		—		10	0
New York City FC II	2023	MLS Next Pro	6	0	—		—		—		—		1	0
New York City FC II	Total		11	0	—		—		—		—		11	0
Career total			105	3	12	0	2	0	0	0	4	0	156	3

== Honors ==
New York City FC

- Campeones Cup: 2022

New York Red Bulls II

- USL Cup: 2016
