= Julián Fernández (footballer, born 2004) =

Argentine footballer (born 2004)

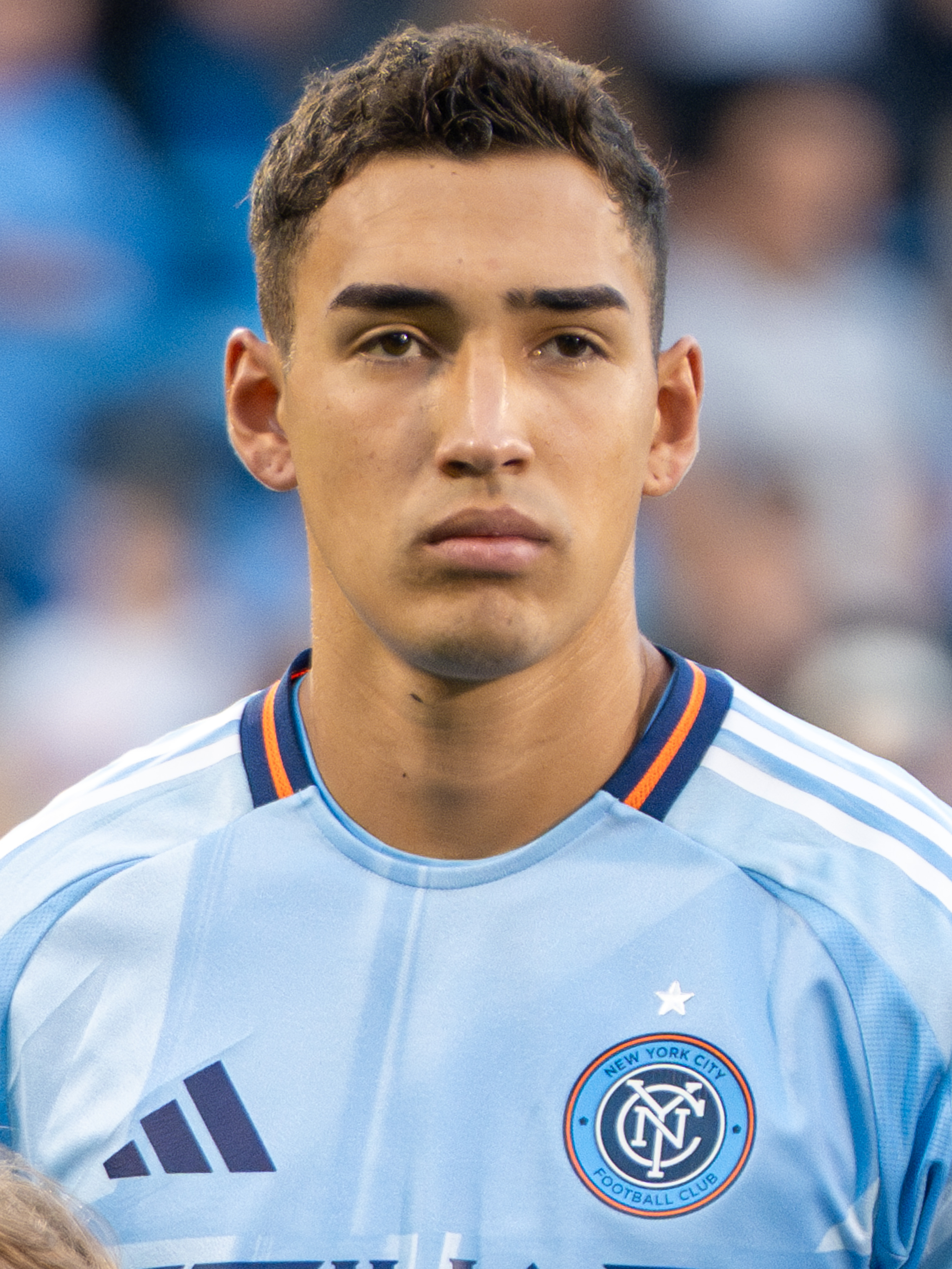
- Fernández with New York City FC in 2025

Personal information
- Full name: Julián Fernández
- Date of birth: 30 January 2004 (age 22)
- Place of birth: Buenos Aires, Argentina
- Height: 1.83 m (6 ft 0 in)
- Position: Forward

Team information
- Current team: Rosario Central (on loan from New York City FC)
- Number: 18

Youth career
- –2022: Vélez Sarsfield

Senior career*
Years	Team	Apps	(Gls)
2022–2023	Vélez Sarsfield	54	(4)
2023–	New York City FC	62	(7)
2026–	→ Rosario Central (loan)	11	(1)
- * Club domestic league appearances and goals as of 17:10, 10 July 2026 (UTC)

Julián Fernández (born 30 January 2004) is an Argentine professional footballer who plays as a forward for Rosario Central, on loan from Major League Soccer club New York City FC.

== Club career ==
=== Vélez Sarsfield ===
Fernández came through the youth system of Club Atlético Vélez Sarsfield, making his professional debut in 2022. He played in both domestic league matches and continental competitions, including the Copa Libertadores.

=== New York City FC ===
On 31 August 2023, Fernández signed with New York City FC in Major League Soccer. The move was part of NYCFC's continued investment in young South American talent. Fernández quickly integrated into the squad, showcasing his pace, dribbling, and ability to stretch defenses from wide areas.

== Style of play ==
Fernández is known for his speed, technical ability, and attacking versatility. Primarily a winger, he can operate on either flank or as a second striker. His dribbling and direct approach make him a constant threat in the final third.

== Honours ==
Rosario Central

- Supercopa Internacional: 2026
