= Strahinja Tanasijević =

Serbian footballer

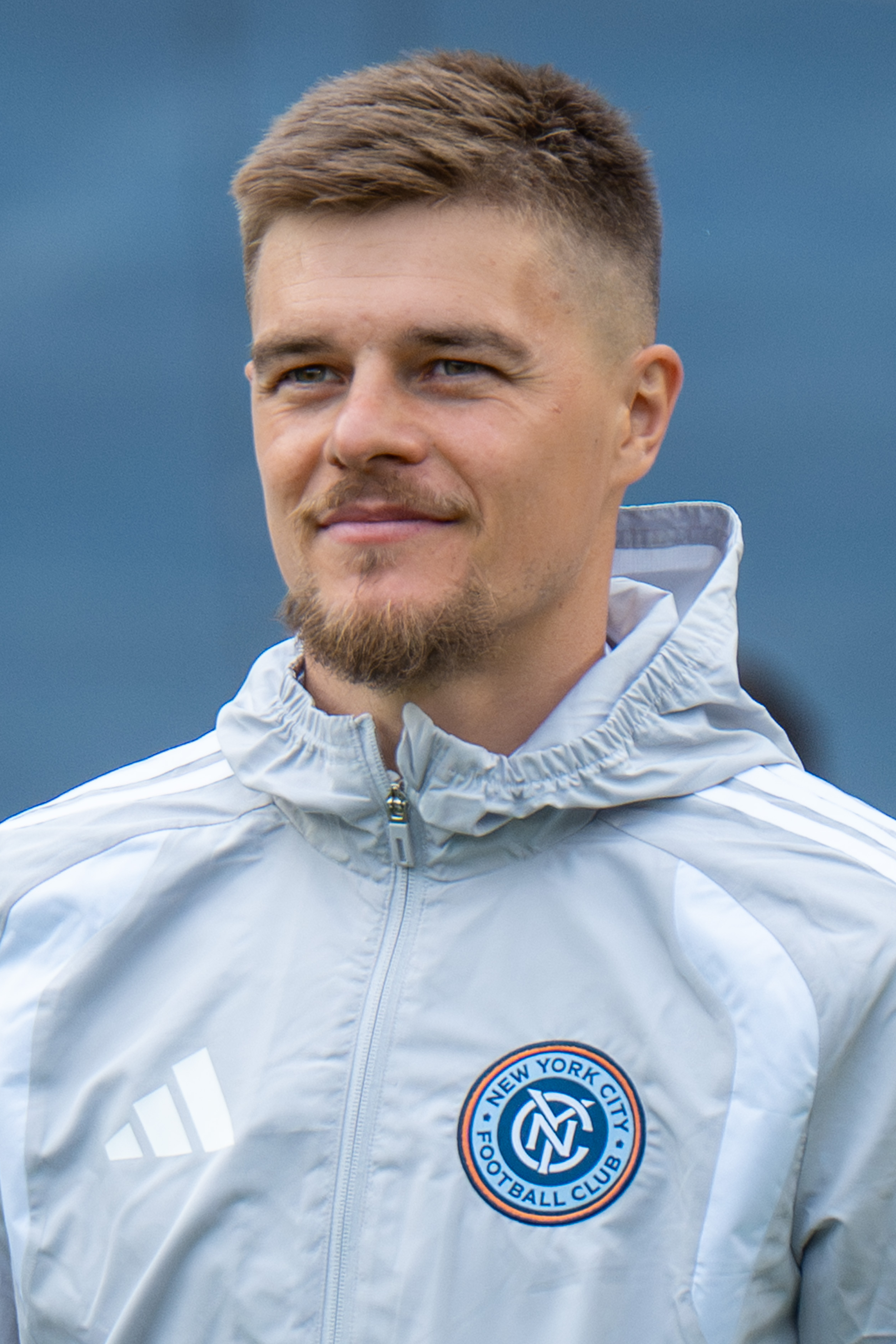
- Tanasijević with New York City in 2026

Personal information
- Date of birth: 12 June 1997 (age 29)
- Place of birth: Mladenovac, FR Yugoslavia
- Height: 1.83 m (6 ft 0 in)
- Position: Centre-back

Team information
- Current team: Yelimay
- Number: 26

Youth career
- Mladenovac
- 2008–2016: Rad

Senior career*
Years	Team	Apps	(Gls)
2015–2018	Rad	9	(0)
2016–2017	→ Žarkovo (loan)	8	(0)
2017	→ Šumadija Aranđelovac (loan)	0	(0)
2018	→ Chievo (loan)	0	(0)
2018–2021	Chievo	1	(0)
2019–2020	→ Paris FC (loan)	0	(0)
2020	→ Rad (loan)	8	(0)
2021–2022	Čukarički	30	(1)
2022–2023	Mladost GAT	15	(0)
2023	Spartak Subotica	17	(0)
2024–2026	New York City	33	(0)
2026–	Yelimay	14	(0)
- * Club domestic league appearances and goals as of 1 November 2026

Strahinja Tanasijević (Serbian Cyrillic: Страхиња Танасијевић, pronounced [strǎxiɲa tanasǐːjeʋitɕ]; born 12 June 1997) is a Serbian professional footballer who plays for Kazakhstan Premier League club Yelimay. He is capable of playing as a central defender or as a full-back on the right flank.

== Club career ==
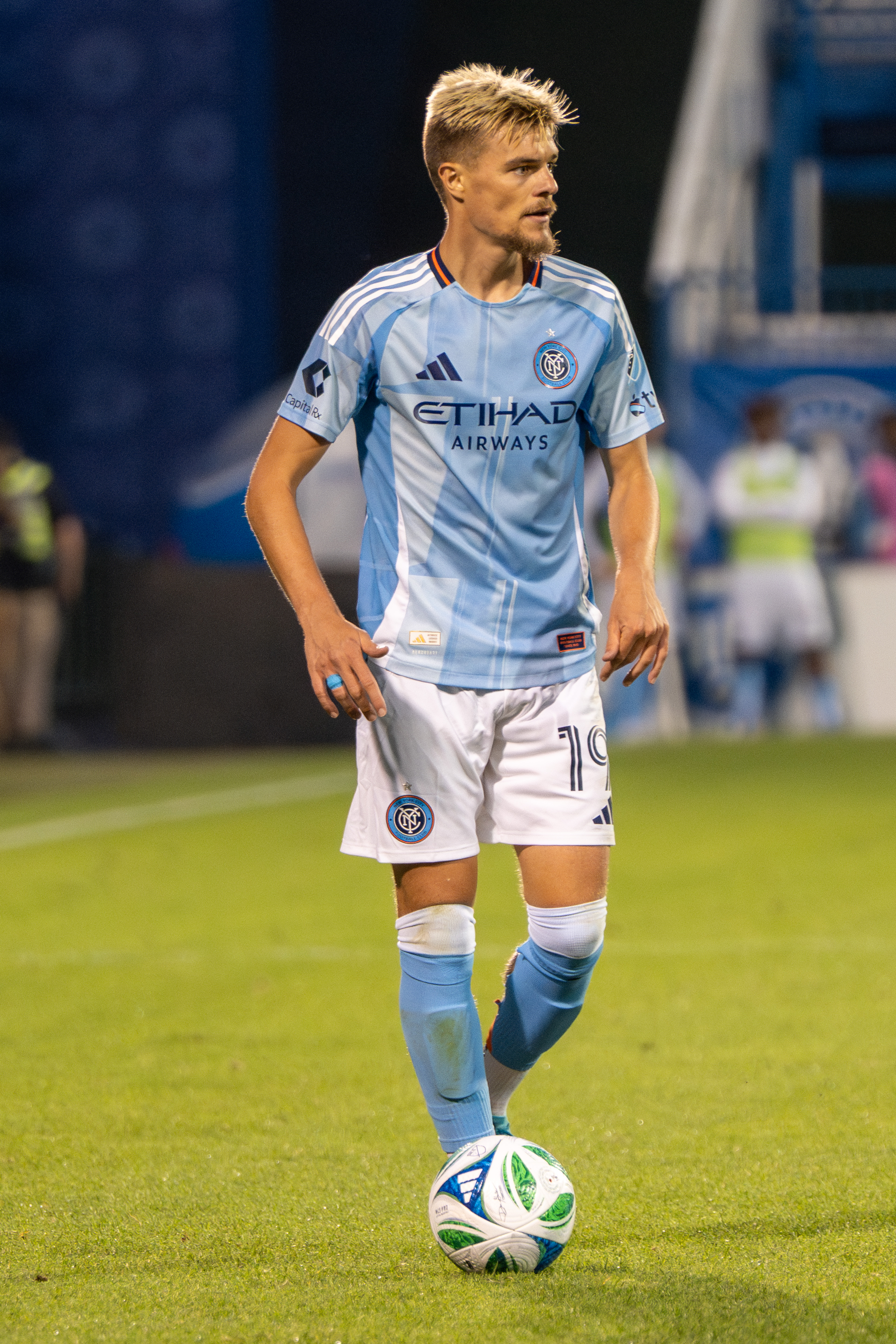
Tanasijevićwith NYCFC in 2025

=== Rad ===
Born in Mladenovac, Tanasijević started playing football with the same named club. He moved to FK Rad youth academy at the age of 11, where he later passed all categories. He signed his first scholarship contract in 2013, after which he extended the deal for two years in 2015. During the 2015–16 campaign, Tanasijević appeared in the UEFA Youth League and he was also licensed for the Serbian SuperLiga, where failed to make any appearance until the end of season. In summer 2016, after overgrown youth selection, Tanasijević was loaned to the satellite club Žarkovo, making 8 caps for the 2016–17 campaign in the Serbian League Belgrade as a bonus player. Returning to Rad, Tanasijević signed his first professional contract with the club in summer 2017, passing the whole pre-season under coach Gordan Petrić. Shortly after, Tanasijević moved on loan to the Serbian League West side Šumadija Aranđelovac, but after he missed opening matches, a deal was terminated and Tanasijević returned to Rad in last days of the summer transfer window.

Tanasijević became a full member of the first team since October 2017 under Slađan Nikolić. He made his official debut for Rad in 3–0 away defeat from Voždovac in 14 fixture of the 2017–18 Serbian SuperLiga campaign. As one of the most deserving home players for 1–0 victory over Napredak Kruševac on 4 November same year, Tanasijević was named in the team of the week in the Serbian SuperLiga.

=== Chievo ===
On the last day of January 2018, Tanasijević moved on six-month loan deal to Chievo, with an option to purchase the contract. Tanasijević stayed on the bench as an unused substitution in 37 fixture away match of the 2017–18 Serie A campaign, against Bologna. On 14 June 2018, Chievo permanently signed with Tanasijević, penning a deal that would keep him in the club until June 2021. At the beginning of the 2018–19 Serie A campaign, Tanasijević converted his squad number and took number 3 jersey.

On 19 July 2019, Tanasijević joined Ligue 2 club Paris FC on a one-year loan.

=== Čukarički ===
On 8 February 2021, he moved to Čukarički.

== International career ==
Tanasijević was called into the Serbian under-19 national team in late 2015, under coach Branislav Nikolić. He was training with the team, but failed to make any appearance in the official competition.

== Career statistics ==
=== Club ===
As of 21 December 2023

Appearances and goals by club, season and competition
Club	Season	League			Cup		League Cup		Continental		Other		Total	
Club	Season	Division	Apps	Goals	Apps	Goals	Apps	Goals	Apps	Goals	Apps	Goals	Apps	Goals
Rad	2015–16	Serbian SuperLiga	0	0	0	0	—		—		—		0	0
Rad	2016–17	Serbian SuperLiga	0	0	—		—		—		—		0	0
Rad	2017–18	Serbian SuperLiga	9	0	1	0	—		—		—		10	0
Rad	Total		9	0	1	0	—		—		—		10	0
Žarkovo (loan)	2016–17	Serbian League Belgrade	8	0	—		—		—		—		8	0
Šumadija Aranđelovac (loan)	2017–18	Serbian League West	0	0	—		—		—		—		0	0
Chievo (loan)	2017–18	Serie A	0	0	—		—		—		—		0	0
Chievo	2018–19	Serie A	1	0	1	0	—		—		—		2	0
Chievo	Total		1	0	1	0	—		—		—		2	0
Paris FC (loan)	2019–20	Ligue 2	0	0	0	0	1	0	—		—		1	0
Rad (loan)	2019–20	Serbian SuperLiga	8	0	—		—		—		—		8	0
Čukarički	2020–21	Serbian SuperLiga	12	1	0	0	—		—		—		12	1
Čukarički	2021–22	Serbian SuperLiga	18	0	1	0	—		4	0	—		23	0
Čukarički	Total		30	1	1	0	—		4	0	—		35	1
Mladost GAT	2022–23	Serbian SuperLiga	15	0	0	0	—		—		—		15	0
Spartak Subotica	2023–24	Serbian SuperLiga	17	0	—		—		—		—		17	0
Career total			88	1	3	0	1	0	4	0	0	0	96	1
