= 2019 Ivy League men's soccer season =

- League: NCAA Division I
- Sport: Soccer
- Duration: August 2019 – November 2019
- Teams: 8

2020 MLS SuperDraft
- Top draft pick: None

Season
- Season champions: Yale
- Runners-up: Penn

Ivy League men's soccer seasons
- ← 2018 2020 →

2019 Ivy League men's soccer standings
	Conf.					Overall
Team	W		L		T	W		L		T
Yale †	6	–	1	–	0	13	–	3	–	2
Penn	4	–	1	–	2	8	–	5	–	3
Cornell	3	–	2	–	2	10	–	5	–	2
Dartmouth	3	–	3	–	1	6	–	7	–	2
Princeton	2	–	2	–	3	10	–	5	–	3
Columbia	2	–	3	–	2	5	–	8	–	4
Brown	2	–	3	–	2	4	–	10	–	3
Harvard	0	–	7	–	0	0	–	14	–	1
† – Conference champion + – Invited to the 2019 NCAA Tournament; As of 17 December 2019; Rankings from United Soccer Coaches

The 2019 Ivy League men's soccer season was the 65th season of the conference sponsoring men's varsity soccer. The season began in August 2019 and concluded in November 2019.

Princeton entered the 2019 season as the defending conference champions by virtue of having the best regular season record. The Ivy League is one of three NCAA Division I men's soccer conferences that do not have a conference tournament to determine their NCAA Tournament berth (the other two are the Pac-12 and the West Coast Conferences).

Princeton was unable to defend its title, as Yale had won its first Ivy League championship since 1989.

== Background ==
=== Previous season ===
The 2018 season was the conference's 64th season sponsoring men's varsity soccer. Princeton won the Ivy League championship with a 5–1–1 record. In the first round, Princeton played Michigan. The match ended in a 1–1 draw, and ended with a 14-round penalty shoot-out. There, Princeton lost 10–11 on penalty kicks to Michigan.

=== Coaching changes ===
There have been no coaching changes during the 2018–19 offseason.

== Head coaches ==
As of the 2018 season

Team	Head coach	Previous job	Years at school	Overall record	Record at school	Ivy League record	NCAA Tournaments	NCAA College Cups	NCAA Titles	Ref.
Brown	Patrick Laughlin	Maine	9	91–77–30 (.535)	83–52–26 (.596)	27–22–14 (.540)	3	0	0	
Columbia	Kevin Anderson	Boston College (asst.)	9	93–69–20 (.566)	80–67–20 (.539)	32–27–11 (.536)	1	0	0	
Cornell	John Smith	Stanford (asst.)	3	19–28–4 (.412)	19–28–4 (.412)	6–14–1 (.310)	0	0	0	
Dartmouth	Bo Oshoniyi	East Tennessee State	2	43–29–20 (.576)	7–5–5 (.559)	4–1–2 (.714)	1	0	0	
Harvard	Pieter Lehrer	California (asst.)	6	35–36–10 (.494)	35–36–10 (.494)	15–13–5 (.530)	0	0	0	
Penn	Brian Gill	Georgetown (asst.)	2	5–5–6 (.500)	5–5–6 (.500)	2–4–1 (.357)	0	0	0	
Princeton	Jim Barlow	Princeton (asst.)	23	178–157–60 (.527)	178–157–60 (.527)	72–61–28 (.534)	4	0	0	
Yale	Kylie Stannard	Michigan State (asst.)	5	16–39–10 (.323)	16–39–10 (.323)	5–15–8 (.321)	0	0	0	

== Preseason ==
=== Preseason poll ===
The preseason poll was released on August 28, 2019.

	Team ranking	Raw Points	First place votes
1.	Princeton	121	11
2.	Dartmouth	102	3
3.	Cornell	94	1
4.	Columbia	90	1
5.	Yale	60	0
6.	Penn	43	0
7.	Brown	41	0
8.	Harvard	25	0

=== Preseason national polls ===
The preseason national polls will be released in July and August 2019.

	United; Soccer	CSN	Soccer; America	Top Drawer; Soccer
Brown	—	—	—	—
Columbia	—	—	—	—
Cornell	—	—	—	—
Dartmouth	—	—	—	—
Harvard	—	—	—	—
Penn	—	—	—	—
Princeton	RV	RV	RV	—
Yale	—	—	—	—

== Regular season ==
=== Early season tournaments ===
Early season tournaments will be announced in late Spring and Summer 2019.

Team	Tournament	Finish
Brown	D.C. Invitational	2nd
Columbia	Creighton Classic	4th
Cornell	Wolverine Classic	3rd
Harvard	Carolina Classic	4th
Yale	Central New York Classic	3rd

== Postseason ==
=== NCAA Tournament ===
The NCAA Tournament will begin in November 2019 and conclude on December 17, 2019.

Seed	Region	School	1st Round	2nd Round	3rd Round	Quarterfinals	Semifinals	Championship
—N/a	3	Yale	L 0–3 vs. Boston College – (Boston, MA)					

== Rankings ==
=== National rankings ===
	Improvement in ranking
	Drop in ranking
RV	Received votes but were not ranked in Top 25
NV	No votes received

		Pre	Wk 1	Wk 2	Wk 3	Wk 4	Wk 5	Wk 6	Wk 7	Wk 8	Wk 9	Wk 10	Wk 11	Wk 12	Wk 13	Wk 14	Wk 15	Wk 16	Final
Brown	USC	NV	NV	NV	NV	NV	NV	NV	NV	NV	NV	NV	NV	NV	None released				NV
Brown	TDS	NV	NV	NV	NV	NV	NV	NV	NV	NV	NV	NV	NV	NV	NV	NV	NV	NV	NV
Columbia	USC	NV	NV	NV	NV	NV	NV	NV	NV	NV	NV	NV	NV	NV	None released				NV
Columbia	TDS	NV	NV	NV	NV	NV	NV	NV	NV	NV	NV	NV	NV	NV	NV	NV	NV	NV	NV
Cornell	USC	NV	NV	NV	NV	NV	NV	NV	RV	NV	NV	NV	NV	NV	None released				NV
Cornell	TDS	NV	NV	NV	NV	NV	NV	NV	NV	NV	NV	NV	NV	NV	NV	NV	NV	NV	NV
Dartmouth	USC	NV	NV	NV	NV	NV	NV	NV	NV	NV	NV	NV	NV	NV	None released				NV
Dartmouth	TDS	NV	NV	NV	NV	NV	NV	NV	NV	NV	NV	NV	NV	NV	NV	NV	NV	NV	NV
Harvard	USC	NV	NV	NV	NV	NV	NV	NV	NV	NV	NV	NV	NV	NV	None released				NV
Harvard	TDS	NV	NV	NV	NV	NV	NV	NV	NV	NV	NV	NV	NV	NV	NV	NV	NV	NV	NV
Penn	USC	NV	NV	NV	NV	NV	NV	NV	NV	NV	NV	NV	NV	NV	None released				NV
Penn	TDS	NV	NV	NV	NV	NV	NV	NV	NV	NV	NV	NV	NV	NV	NV	NV	NV	NV	NV
Princeton	USC	RV	RV	NV	NV	NV	NV	NV	NV	NV	RV	RV	NV	NV	None released				NV
Princeton	TDS	NV	NV	NV	NV	NV	NV	NV	NV	NV	NV	RV	RV	NV	NV	NV	NV	NV	NV
Yale	USC	NV	NV	NV	RV	RV	RV	RV	24	24	RV	RV	RV	25	None released				RV
Yale	TDS	NV	NV	NV	NV	RV	RV	NV	RV	RV	RV	RV	RV	NV	RV	NV	NV	NV	NV

=== Regional rankings - USC Northeast Region ===
	Improvement in ranking
	Drop in ranking
RV	Received votes but were not ranked in Top 10
NV	No votes received

The United Soccer Coaches' Northeast poll features teams from the Ivy League, America East, NEC, and MAAC.

	Wk 1	Wk 2	Wk 3	Wk 4	Wk 5	Wk 6	Wk 7	Wk 8	Wk 9	Wk 10	Wk 11	Wk 12
Brown	NV	NV	NV	NV	NV	NV	NV	NV	NV	NV	NV	NV
Columbia	8	NV	NV	NV	NV	NV	NV	NV	NV	NV	NV	NV
Cornell	10	3	3	4	2	5	4	5	7	7	7	7
Dartmouth	6	NV	4	5	9	NV	NV	9	NV	NV	NV	NV
Harvard	NV	NV	NV	NV	NV	NV	NV	NV	NV	NV	NV	NV
Penn	NV	6	7	3	NV	8	8	NV	9	10	10	9
Princeton	2	NV	NV	10	6	7	9	4	2	2	3	3
Yale	NV	10	2	2	3	2	2	2	3	3	2	2

== Awards and honors ==
=== Player of the week honors ===
Week	Player of the Week			Rookie of the Week			Ref.
Week	Player	Position	Team	Player	Position	Team	Ref.
Sep. 9	Mark Winhoffer	MF	Yale	Will Citron	DF	Cornell	
Sep. 16	Zach Kalk	MF	Dartmouth	Walker Gillespie	FW	Princeton	
Sep. 23	Harry Fuller	MF	Cornell	Walker Gillespie	FW	Princeton	
Sep. 30	Ryan Bayne	DF	Cornell	Michael Collodi	GK	Columbia	
Oct. 7	John Denis	MF	Columbia	Sigfus Árnason	MF	Yale	
Oct. 14	Mark Winhoffer	MF	Yale	Griffin Garrard	FW	Cornell	
Oct. 21	Miguel Yuste	MF	Yale	Daniel Diaz Bonilla	FW	Princeton	
Oct. 28	Brandon Bartel	MF	Penn	Jack Rosener	MF	Penn	
Nov. 4	Walker Gillespie	FW	Princeton	Walker Gillespie	FW	Princeton	
Nov. 11	John Denis	MF	Columbia	Uri Zeitz	MF	Columbia	
Nov. 18	Miguel Yuste	MF	Yale	Kai Lammers	DF	Penn	

=== Postseason honors ===
2019 Ivy League Men's Soccer Individual Awards
Award	Recipient(s)
Offensive Player of the Year	Mark Winhoffer, Yale
Defensive Player of the Year	Alex Touche, Penn
Rookie of the Year	Uri Zeitz, Columbia
Coach of the Year	Kylie Stannard, Yale

2019 Ivy League Men's Soccer All-Conference Teams
First Team Honorees	Second Team Honorees	Honorable Mention
Alex Touche, Penn (Jr., D); Enzo Okpoye, Yale (So., M); Ryan Bayne, Cornell (Sr., D); Jacob Schachner, Princeton (Sr., GK); Elian Haddock, Yale (So., GK); Mark Winhoffer, Yale (Jr., M); Joey Bhangdia, Penn (Jr., M); John Scearce, Cornell (Sr., M ) Miguel Yuste, Yale (Sr., M); Walker Gillespie, Princeton (Fr., F); John Denis, Columbia (Sr., M/F); Kevin O'Toole, Princeton (Jr., M)	Henry Baldwin, Dartmouth (Sr., D); Justin Lobe, Yale (Sr., D); Connor Drought, Cornell (Fr., D); Kai Lammers, Penn (Fr., D); Cole Morokhovich, Princeton (Sr., D); Alex Budnik, Dartmouth (So., GK); Uri Zeitz, Columbia (Fr., M); Danny Schiller, Brown (Sr., M); Braden Salvati, Dartmouth (Sr., M/D); Ryan Matteo, Yale (Sr., M); Dawson McCartney, Dartmouth (Jr., M); Matt Chow, Brown (Sr., F)	Owen Schwartz, Brown (Fr., D); Matthew Swain, Columbia (Sr., M/F); Matthew Glass, Harvard (Sr., M); Alex Charles, Princeton (So., D); Jeremy Haddock, Yale (So., D); Derek Waleffe, Brown (So., M); Brandon Bartel, Penn (Sr., M); Andrew Stevens, Columbia (So., M); Emeka Eneli, Cornell (So., F); Danny Laranetto, Columbia (Sr., M); Harry Fuller, Cornell (Jr., M ) Ohad Yahalom, Dartmouth (So., M); Moulay Hamza Kanzi Belghiti, Princeton (So., M); Zach Kalk, Dartmouth (Sr., M); Paolo Carroll, Yale (So., F); Jake Kohlbrenner, Penn (Jr., F)

==== Regional awards ====
Award	Recipients
CoSIDA Academic All-District	John Leisman, Yale
CoSIDA Academic All-District	Matthew Swain, Columbia
United Soccer All-Northeast First-Team	Walker Gillespie, Princeton
United Soccer All-Northeast First-Team	Mark Winhoffer, Yale
United Soccer All-Northeast First-Team	Miguel Yuste, Yale
United Soccer All-Northeast Second-Team	John Scearce, Cornell
United Soccer All-Northeast Second-Team	Kevin O'Toole, Princeton
United Soccer All-Northeast Second-Team	Enzo Okpoye, Yale
United Soccer All-Northeast Third-Team	Alex Touche, Penn
United Soccer All-Northeast Third-Team	Ryan Matteo, Yale

== 2020 MLS Draft ==
The 2020 MLS SuperDraft was held in January 2020. No players from the Ivy League were selected in the SuperDraft.

== Homegrown players ==
The Homegrown Player Rule is a Major League Soccer program that allows MLS teams to sign local players from their own development academies directly to MLS first team rosters. Before the creation of the rule in 2008, every player entering Major League Soccer had to be assigned through one of the existing MLS player allocation processes, such as the MLS SuperDraft.

To place a player on its homegrown player list, making him eligible to sign as a homegrown player, players must have resided in that club's home territory and participated in the club's youth development system for at least one year. Players can play college soccer and still be eligible to sign a homegrown contract.

No players from the Ivy League signed homegrown contracts with their parent MLS clubs.
