= 2020 Ivy League men's soccer season =

- League: NCAA Division I
- Sport: Soccer
- Duration: Cancelled
- Teams: 8

2021 MLS SuperDraft
- Top draft pick: Dawson McCartney (#43)
- Picked by: Portland Timbers

Season

Ivy League men's soccer seasons
- ← 2019 2021 →

2020 Ivy League men's soccer standings
	Conf.					Overall
Team	W		L		T	W		L		T
Brown	0	–	0	–	0	0	–	0	–	0
Columbia	0	–	0	–	0	0	–	0	–	0
Cornell	0	–	0	–	0	0	–	0	–	0
Dartmouth	0	–	0	–	0	0	–	0	–	0
Harvard	0	–	0	–	0	0	–	0	–	0
Penn	0	–	0	–	0	0	–	0	–	0
Princeton	0	–	0	–	0	0	–	0	–	0
Yale	0	–	0	–	0	0	–	0	–	0
As of September 18, 2020

The 2020 Ivy League men's soccer season was to be the 66th season of the conference sponsoring men's varsity soccer. The season initially was scheduled to begin on August 28, 2020 and conclude on November 14, 2020, but has postponed to begin on February 3, 2021 and conclude on April 17, 2021.

On July 8, 2020, the Ivy League announced that no sports would be played until January 1, 2021, at the earliest, because of the COVID-19 pandemic. It has not yet been determined whether men's soccer will take place in the spring or not at all. On September 16, 2020, the NCAA announced that the season will resume on February 3, 2021.

On November 13, 2020, the Ivy League announced that spring sports, including men's soccer, will be cancelled, making it the first year since 1954 that men's soccer will not be played.

Yale were going to enter the season as the defending champions.

== Background ==
=== Previous season ===
The 2019 season was the conference's 65th season sponsoring men's varsity soccer. Yale won the Ivy League championship with a 6–1–0 conference record, at one point being ranked as high as 24th in the nation. In the first round, Princeton played Boston College, where they were defeated 0–3.

=== Coaching changes ===
Following the conclusion of the 2019 season, Harvard head coach, Pieter Lehrer, was fired. Lehrer was replaced by Josh Shapiro on January 13, 2020.

== Head coaches ==
As of the 2019 season

Team	Head coach	Previous job	Years at school	Overall record	Record at school	Ivy League record	NCAA Tournaments	NCAA College Cups	NCAA Titles	Ref.
Brown	Patrick Laughlin	Maine	10	95–87–33 (.519)	87–62–29 (.570)	29–25–16 (.529)	3	0	0	
Columbia	Kevin Anderson	Boston College (asst.)	10	98–77–24 (.553)	85–75–24 (.527)	34–30–13 (.526)	1	0	0	
Cornell	John Smith	Stanford (asst.)	4	29–33–6 (.471)	29–33–6 (.471)	9–16–3 (.375)	0	0	0	
Dartmouth	Bo Oshoniyi	East Tennessee State	3	49–36–22 (.561)	13–12–7 (.516)	7–4–3 (.607)	1	0	0	
Harvard	Josh Shapiro	Tufts	1	126–37–30 (.731)	0–0–0 (–)	0–0–0 (–)	0	0	0	
Penn	Brian Gill	Georgetown (asst.)	3	13–10–9 (.547)	13–10–9 (.547)	6–5–3 (.536)	0	0	0	
Princeton	Jim Barlow	Princeton (asst.)	24	188–162–63 (.531)	188–162–63 (.531)	74–63–31 (.533)	4	0	0	
Yale	Kylie Stannard	Michigan State (asst.)	6	29–42–12 (.422)	29–42–12 (.422)	11–16–8 (.429)	1	0	0	

== MLS SuperDraft ==
The MLS SuperDraft was held on January 21, 2021 and we held virtually through its website. One player from the Ivy League was selected in the draft.

=== Total picks by school ===
Team	Round 1	Round 2	Round 3	Total
Brown	0	0	0	0
Columbia	0	0	0	0
Cornell	0	0	0	0
Dartmouth	0	1	0	1
Harvard	0	0	0	0
Penn	0	0	0	0
Princeton	0	0	0	0
Yale	0	0	0	0
Total	0	1	0	1

=== List of selections ===
Round	Pick #	MLS team	Player	Position	College	Ref
2	43	Portland Timbers	Dawson McCartney	FW	Dartmouth	

=== Notable undrafted players ===
The following are notable players who went pro following the end of the season that were not selected in the 2021 MLS SuperDraft.

Player	Position	College	Moving to	Ref.
Alex Touche	MF	Penn	New Mexico United	

== Homegrown players ==
The Homegrown Player Rule is a Major League Soccer program that allows MLS teams to sign local players from their own development academies directly to MLS first team rosters. Before the creation of the rule in 2008, every player entering Major League Soccer had to be assigned through one of the existing MLS player allocation processes, such as the MLS SuperDraft.

To place a player on its homegrown player list, making him eligible to sign as a homegrown player, players must have resided in that club's home territory and participated in the club's youth development system for at least one year. Players can play college soccer and still be eligible to sign a homegrown contract.

Original MLS team	Player	Pos.	School
New York City FC	Andres Jasson	MF	Yale (Fr.)
Atlanta United FC	Will Crain	D	Brown (So.)
