= 2021 MLS SuperDraft =

College draft for soccer teams

General information
- Sport: Soccer
- Date: January 21, 2021
- Time: 2:00 p.m. EST
- Network: MLSSoccer.com

Overview
- 76 total selections in 3 rounds
- League: Major League Soccer
- Teams: 27
- First selection: Daniel Pereira, Austin FC
- Most selections: Austin FC, FC Dallas, Nashville SC (5)

The 2021 MLS SuperDraft was the 22nd edition of the SuperDraft conducted by Major League Soccer. The SuperDraft is held every January prior to the start of the MLS season. The 2020 SuperDraft was the first held exclusively via conference call and web streaming. The Draft was once again held virtually, and began on January 21, 2021 at 2:00 p.m. Eastern Time, and consisted of three rounds (shortened from four rounds in prior years). Compensatory picks were conveyed to teams that received fourth-round picks via trades.

== Format ==
The SuperDraft format has remained constant throughout its history and closely resembles that of the NFL draft:

1. Any expansion teams receive the first picks. MLS has announced that Austin FC would begin play as an expansion team in 2021.
2. Non-playoff clubs receive the next picks in reverse order of prior season finish.
3. Teams that made the MLS Cup Playoffs are then ordered by which round of the playoffs they are eliminated.
4. The winners of the MLS Cup are given the last selection, and the losers the penultimate selection.

== Player selection ==
Player key
*	Denotes player who has been selected for an MLS Best XI team						
^	Member of 2021 Generation Adidas class						
†	Player who was named to an MLS Best XI and Generation Adidas						
Signed key
29	Denotes player who signed for an MLS team (Division I)						
21	Denotes player who signed for a USL Championship team (Division II)						
16	Denotes player who signed for a USL League One, MLS Next Pro, or NISA team (Division III)						
3	Denotes player who signed for a team outside the United States soccer league system						
Positions key
GK	Goalkeeper	DF	Defender	MF	Midfielder	FW	Forward

=== Round 1 ===
P	MLS team	Player	Pos.	College	Conference	Academy team	Amateur team	Signed
1	Austin FC	(Venezuela) Daniel Pereira	MF	Virginia Tech	ACC	Virginia Blue Ridge Star	—N/a	(United States) Austin FC
2	FC Cincinnati	(England) Calvin Harris	FW	Wake Forest	ACC	Wellington Phoenix	—N/a	(United States) FC Cincinnati
3	Colorado Rapids (Note: No. 3: Houston Dynamo → Colorado Rapids. January 21, 2021: Colorado Rapids acquired a first-round selection in the 2021 SuperDraft from Houston Dynamo in exchange for $200,000 in general allocation money and the 6th overall draft pick. The pick was Houston's natural selection.)	(Kenya) Philip Mayaka	MF	Clemson	ACC	Orlando City SC	—N/a	(United States) Colorado Rapids
4	D.C. United	(England) Kimarni Smith	FW	Clemson	ACC	Sheffield United	Greenville FC	(United States) D.C. United
5	D.C. United (Note: No. 5: Atlanta United → D.C. United. January 21, 2021: D.C. United acquired the 5th and 32nd picks from Atlanta United FC in exchange for the 31st pick and $125,000 in general allocation money.)	(United States) Michael DeShields	DF	Wake Forest	ACC	Baltimore Celtic	Treasure Coast Tritons	(United States) D.C. United
6	Houston Dynamo (Note: No. 6: Chicago Fire → Colorado Rapids → Houston Dynamo. December 13, 2020: Colorado Rapids acquired a first-round selection in the 2021 SuperDraft from Chicago Fire FC in exchange for $125,000 in general allocation money. The pick was Chicago's natural selection.) (Note: No. 6: Colorado Rapids → Houston Dynamo. January 21, 2021: Colorado Rapids acquired a first-round selection in the 2021 SuperDraft from Houston Dynamo in exchange for $200,000 in general allocation money and the 6th overall draft pick. The pick was Houston's natural selection.)	(United States) Ethan Bartlow	DF	Washington	Pac-12	Crossfire Premier	Crossfire Redmond	(United States) Houston Dynamo
7	Real Salt Lake	(United States) Bret Halsey	DF	Virginia	ACC	Loudoun Soccer	Northern Virginia United	(United States) Real Salt Lake
8	Orlando City SC (Note: No. 8: LA Galaxy → Portland Timbers → Orlando City. January 12, 2021: Portland Timbers acquired a first-round selection in the 2021 SuperDraft from LA Galaxy in exchange for Jorge Villafaña and swapping first-round selections. The pick was Galaxy's natural selection. Portland subsequently traded Galaxy's pick on January 21, 2021, to Orlando City in exchange for $100,000 general allocation money.)	(United States) Derek Dodson	FW	Georgetown	Big East	Sockers FC	Treasure Coast Tritons	(United States) Orlando City SC
9	Vancouver Whitecaps FC	(Nigeria) David Egbo	FW	Akron	MAC	Century Soccer	Black Rock FC	(Canada) Vancouver Whitecaps FC
10	Inter Miami CF	(United States) Josh Penn	FW	Indiana	Big Ten	Sockers FC	Indy Eleven	(United States) Inter Miami CF
11	Austin FC (Note: No. 11: CF Montréal → Austin FC. December 15, 2020: Austin FC acquired a first-round selection in the 2021 SuperDraft from CF Montréal and $225,000 in general allocation money in exchange for Kamal Miller.)	(United States) Freddy Kleemann	DF	Washington	Pac-12	Real So Cal	Ventura County Fusion	(United States) Austin FC
12	San Jose Earthquakes	(United States) Thomas Williamson	FW	California	Pac-12	Strikers FC	Orange County SC U23	(United States) San Jose Earthquakes
13	New York Red Bulls	(Guadeloupe) Luther Archimède	FW	Syracuse	ACC	Sochaux	—N/a	(United States) New York Red Bulls II
14	Los Angeles FC	(Mexico) Danny Trejo	FW	CSUN	Big West	Olé Soccer Club	FC Golden State Force	(United States) Las Vegas Lights
15	FC Dallas (Note: No. 15: Colorado Rapids → FC Dallas. January 13, 2021: FC Dallas acquired a first-round selection in the 2021 SuperDraft from Colorado Rapids in exchange for Michael Barrios and swapping first-round selections. The pick was Colorado's natural selection.)	(United States) Nicky Hernandez	MF	SMU	American	Dallas Texans	Texas United	(United States) FC Dallas
16	LA Galaxy (Note: No. 16: Portland Timbers → LA Galaxy. See No. 8: LA Galaxy → Portland Timbers → Orlando City.)	(United States) Josh Drack	FW	Denver	Summit	Portland Timbers	Colorado Pride Switchbacks U23	(United States) LA Galaxy II
17	Minnesota United FC (Note: No. 17: New York City FC → Minnesota United. January 21, 2021: Minnesota United acquired the 17th selection from New York City FC in exchange for $50,000 in general allocation money.)	(Jamaica) Justin McMaster	FW	Wake Forest	ACC	Philadelphia Union	Bethlehem Steel	(United States) Minnesota United FC
18	Minnesota United FC (Note: No. 18: Toronto FC → Minnesota United. Minnesota United acquired the 18th selection from Toronto FC in exchange for the 25th selection and $50,000 in general allocation money.)	(Kenya) Nabilai Kibunguchy	DF	UC Davis	Big West	Sacramento Republic	San Francisco Glens	(United States) Minnesota United FC
19	Orlando City SC (Note: No. 19: Philadelphia Union → Orlando City. July 17, 2020: Orlando City SC acquired a first-round selection in the 2021 SuperDraft in exchange for the homegrown player rights to Nathan Harriel. The traded pick was Philadelphia's natural selection.)	(United States) Rio Hope-Gund	DF	Georgetown	Big East	New York SC	Manhattan SC	(United States) Orlando City SC
20	Nashville SC	(Burundi) Irakoze Donasiyano	MF	Virginia	ACC	Roanoke Star	Daytona Rush	(United States) Nashville SC
21	Austin FC (Note: No. 21: FC Dallas → Colorado Rapids → Austin FC. See No. 15: Colorado Rapids → FC Dallas. Austin FC subsequently acquired the FC Dallas selection (21st overall) from Colorado Rapids in exchange for $50,000 in general allocation money.)	(United States) Aedan Stanley	DF	Duke	ACC	St. Louis Scott Gallagher	Portland Timbers 2	(United States) Austin FC
22	Orlando City SC	(United States) Brandon Hackenberg	DF	Penn State	Big Ten	Richmond United	Reading United	(United States) Orlando City B
23	Vancouver Whitecaps FC (Note: No. 23: Sporting Kansas City → Vancouver Whitecaps FC. December 14, 2018: Vancouver Whitecaps FC acquired a first-round selection in the 2021 SuperDraft in exchange for Erik Hurtado. The traded picks were Kansas City's natural selections.)	(Jamaica) Javain Brown	DF	South Florida	American	Harbour View	Treasure Coast Tritons	(Canada) Vancouver Whitecaps FC
24	New England Revolution	(Uganda) Edward Kizza	FW	Pittsburgh	ACC	Montverde Academy	—N/a	(United States) New England Revolution
25	Toronto FC (Note: No. 25: Minnesota United → Toronto FC. See No. 18: Toronto FC → Minnesota United.)	(United States) Matt Di Rosa	MF	Maryland	Big Ten	Bethesda SC	—N/a	(United States) Loudoun United
26	Inter Miami CF (Note: No. 26: Seattle Sounders FC → Inter Miami. September 28, 2020: Inter Miami CF acquired a first-round selection in the 2021 SuperDraft in exchange for Román Torres.)	(Zambia) Aimé Mabika	DF	Kentucky	C-USA	—N/a	Cincinnati Dutch Lions	(United States) Fort Lauderdale CF
27	Columbus Crew	(Senegal) Justin Malou	DF	Clemson	ACC	Montverde Academy	SIMA Águilas	(United States) Columbus Crew 2

=== Round 2 ===
P	MLS team	Player	Pos.	College	Conference	Academy team	Amateur team	Signed
28	Austin FC	(Scotland) Daniel Steedman	MF	Virginia	ACC	Charlotte Soccer Academy	Charlotte Independence	(United States) North Carolina FC
29	FC Cincinnati	(United States) Avionne Flanagan	DF	South Florida	American	D.C. United	Treasure Coast Tritons	(United States) FC Cincinnati
30	Houston Dynamo FC	(United States) Kristo Strickler	FW	Virginia Tech	ACC	Blast FC	Dayton Dutch Lions	(United States) South Georgia Tormenta
31	Atlanta United FC (Note: No. 31: D.C. United → Atlanta United. See No. 5: Atlanta United → D.C. United.)	(United States) Josh Bauer	DF	New Hampshire	America East	GPS New Hampshire	Seattle Sounders FC U-23	(United States) Atlanta United FC
32	D.C. United (Note: No. 32: Atlanta United → D.C. United. See No. 5: Atlanta United → D.C. United.)	(United States) Logan Panchot	DF	Stanford	Pac-12	St. Louis Scott Gallagher	San Francisco City	(United States) Loudoun United
33	Chicago Fire FC	(United States) Jackson Ragen	DF	Michigan	Big Ten	Seattle Sounders FC	OSA Seattle FC	(United States) Tacoma Defiance
34	Real Salt Lake	(United States) Elijah Amo	MF	Louisville	ACC	Bethesda SC	—N/a	(United States) Maryland Bobcats
35	LA Galaxy	(United States) Preston Judd	FW	Denver	Summit	LVSA	—N/a	(United States) LA Galaxy II
36	Nashville SC (Note: No. 36: Vancouver Whitecaps FC → Nashville SC. January 21, 2021: Nashville SC traded a 2021 international spot and its second-round selection (46th overall) in the 2021 MLS SuperDraft, to Vancouver Whitecaps FC for $175,000 in general allocation money and Vancouver's second-round selection (36th overall).)	(United States) Tom Judge	DF	James Madison	CAA	Christian Brothers Academy	Cedar Stars Rush	(United States) Nashville SC
37	Inter Miami CF	(United States) Joe Hafferty	DF	Oregon State	Pac-12	Seattle Sounders FC	Eastside FC	(United States) Tacoma Defiance
38	Minnesota United FC (Note: No. 38: CF Montréal → Minnesota United. October 1, 2020: Minnesota United FC acquired a second-round selection in the 2021 SuperDraft and $600,000 in general allocation money from CF Montréal in exchange for forward Mason Toye.)	(United States) Sean O'Hearn	DF	Georgetown	Big East	PA Classics	Treasure Coast Tritons	(United States) New England Revolution II
39	San Jose Earthquakes	(Ghana) George Asomani	MF	NC State	ACC	New York Cosmos	North Carolina FC U23	(United States) San Jose Earthquakes
40	New York Red Bulls	(Guinea) Lamine Conte	DF	Louisville	ACC	Philadelphia Union	Reading United	(United States) New York Red Bulls II
41	Los Angeles FC	(United States) CC Uche	DF	Ohio State	Big Ten	Georgia United	Chicago FC United	(United States) Las Vegas Lights
42	Colorado Rapids	PASS	—N/a	—N/a	—N/a	—N/a	—N/a	—N/a
43	Portland Timbers	(United States) Dawson McCartney	MF	Dartmouth	Ivy	Philadelphia Union	Reading United	(United States) Portland Timbers 2
44	New York City FC	(United States) Ben Di Rosa	DF	Maryland	Big Ten	Bethesda SC	—N/a	(United States) Charleston Battery
45	Toronto FC	(England) Nathaniel Crofts	FW	Virginia	ACC	Sheffield United	Long Island Rough Riders	(England) Stocksbridge Park Steels
46	Vancouver Whitecaps FC (Note: No. 46: Philadelphia Union → Nashville SC → Vancouver Whitecaps FC. January 19, 2021: Nashville SC acquired second- and third-round selections in the 2021 SuperDraft and a first-round selection in the 2022 SuperDraft in exchange for up to $225,000 of general allocation money.) (Note: No. 46: Vancouver Whitecaps FC → Nashville SC. See No. 36: Nashville SC → Vancouver Whitecaps.)	(United States) Eric Iloski	MF	UCLA	Pac-12	Real Salt Lake AZ	Ogden City SC	(United States) Las Vegas Lights
47	Chicago Fire FC (Note: No. 47: Nashville → Chicago Fire. November 12, 2019: Chicago Fire FC acquired a second-round selection in the 2021 SuperDraft, $50,000 in general allocation money, and $50,000 in targeted allocation money from Nashville SC in exchange for midfielder Dax McCarty.)	(United States) Christian Pinzón	FW	Cal State Fullerton	Big West	California Rush	FC Golden State Force	(Mexico) Tapatío
48	FC Dallas	(United States) Colin Shutler	GK	Virginia	ACC	Loudoun Soccer	Northern Virginia United	(United States) North Texas SC
49	Orlando City SC	(United States) Andrew Pannenberg	GK	Wake Forest	ACC	Charlotte Independence	Charlotte Eagles	(United States) Colorado Springs Switchbacks
50	Sporting Kansas City	(Canada) Matt Constant	DF	North Carolina	ACC	Dallas Texans	Texas United	(United States) Sporting Kansas City II
51	New England Revolution	(Haiti) Francois Dulysse	DF	Manhattan College	MAAC	Portland Timbers	Treasure Coast Tritons	(United States) New England Revolution II
52	Columbus Crew (Note: No. 52: Minnesota United → Columbus Crew. February 12, 2020: Columbus Crew acquired a second-round selection in the 2021 SuperDraft from Minnesota United FC in exchange for the MLS rights to Aaron Schoenfeld.)	(United States) Joshua Jackson-Ketchup	DF	Ohio State	Big Ten	Montverde Academy	—N/a	
53	Vancouver Whitecaps FC (Note: No. 53: Seattle Sounders FC → Vancouver Whitecaps FC. August 22, 2019: Vancouver Whitecaps FC acquired a second-round selection in the 2021 SuperDraft from Seattle Sounders FC in exchange for an international roster spot for the remainder of the 2019 MLS season.)	(Canada) Joel Harrison	DF	Michigan	Big Ten	Vancouver Whitecaps FC	Whitecaps FC 2	
54	FC Cincinnati (Note: No. 54: Columbus Crew → FC Cincinnati. August 17, 2020: FC Cincinnati acquired a second-round selection in the 2021 SuperDraft from Columbus Crew in exchange for Fatai Alashe.)	(Norway) Jonas Fjeldberg	MF	Dayton	A-10	Ull/Kisa	Dayton Dutch Lions	(United States) FC Cincinnati

=== Round 3 ===
P	MLS team	Player	Pos.	College	Conference	Academy team	Amateur team	Signed
55	Austin FC	(United States) Noah Lawrence	GK	Ohio State	Big Ten	D.C. United	Cincinnati Dutch Lions	(United States) Portland Timbers 2
56	FC Cincinnati	(United States) Matthew Vowinkel	FW	Hofstra	CAA	Massapequa SC	Westchester Flames	(United States) One Knoxville
57	Houston Dynamo FC	(United States) Brandon Terwege	DF	SMU	American	FC Dallas	Denton Diablos	
58	Columbus Crew (Note: No. 58: DC United → Columbus Crew. January 8, 2021: Columbus Crew acquired a third-round selection in the 2021 SuperDraft from D.C. United in exchange for goalkeeper Jon Kempin.)	PASS	—N/a	—N/a	—N/a	—N/a	—N/a	—N/a
59	Atlanta United FC	(United States) Aiden McFadden	MF	Notre Dame	ACC	Penn Fusion	West Chester United SC	(United States) Atlanta United 2
60	Chicago Fire FC	(United States) Mitch Guitar	MF	Wisconsin	Big Ten	Vardar	Flint City Bucks	(United States) Memphis 901
61	Real Salt Lake	(United States) Aris Briggs	FW	Georgia State	Sun Belt	Concorde Fire	Greenville FC	(United States) Real Monarchs
62	LA Galaxy	PASS	—N/a	—N/a	—N/a	—N/a	—N/a	—N/a
63	CF Montréal (Note: No. 63: Vancouver Whitecaps FC → CF Montréal. September 28, 2020: CF Montréal acquired a third-round selection in the 2021 SuperDraft from Vancouver Whitecaps FC in exchange for goalkeeper Evan Bush.)	(United States) Giuseppe Barone	MF	Michigan State	Big Ten	Crew SC Academy Wolves	Flint City Bucks	
64	Toronto FC (Note: No. 64: Inter Miami → Toronto FC. December 28, 2019: Toronto FC acquired a third-round selection in the 2021 SuperDraft from Inter Miami CF in exchange for the MLS rights to forward Juan Agudelo.)	(United States) Paul Rothrock	MF	Georgetown	Big East	Seattle Sounders FC	OSA Seattle FC	(Canada) Toronto FC II
65	CF Montréal	PASS	—N/a	—N/a	—N/a	—N/a	—N/a	—N/a
66	San Jose Earthquakes	PASS	—N/a	—N/a	—N/a	—N/a	—N/a	—N/a
67	New York Red Bulls	(United States) AJ Marcucci	GK	Connecticut College	NESCAC	Penn Fusion SA	West Chester United SC	(United States) New York Red Bulls II
68	Los Angeles FC	(United States) Alvaro Quezada	FW	UC Irvine	Big West	LA Premier FC	—N/a	(United States) Los Angeles FC
69	Colorado Rapids	PASS	—N/a	—N/a	—N/a	—N/a	—N/a	—N/a
70	Portland Timbers	(United States) Diego Gutierrez	FW	Creighton	Big East	Elite Academy	—N/a	(United States) Portland Timbers
71	New York City FC	(Serbia) Vuk Latinovich	MF	Milwaukee	Horizon	FK Brodarac	Chicago FC United	(United States) New York City FC
72	Toronto FC	(United States) Talen Maples	DF	SMU	American	Lonestar SC	Brazos Valley Cavalry	(Canada) Toronto FC II
73	Nashville SC (Note: No. 73: Philadelphia Union → Nashville SC. See No. 46: Philadelphia Union → Nashville SC → Vancouver Whitecaps.)	(Norway) Sondre Norheim	DF	Syracuse	ACC	Viking FK	New York Red Bulls U-23	(Norway) Bryne
74	Nashville SC	(United States) Tor Saunders	GK	Coastal Carolina	Sun Belt	Seattle Sounders FC	Tormenta FC 2	(United States) Nashville SC
75	FC Dallas	(France) Thibaut Jacquel	FW	Campbell	Big South	FC Metz	Lionsbridge FC	(United States) North Texas SC
76	FC Dallas (Note: No. 76: Orlando City → FC Dallas. February 27, 2020: FC Dallas acquired a third-round selection in the 2021 SuperDraft from Orlando City SC.)	(United States) Mark Salas	DF	North Carolina	ACC	FC Dallas	Denton Diablos	(United States) North Texas SC
77	Sporting Kansas City	(England) Jamil Roberts	FW	Marshall	C-USA	Plymouth Argyle	West Virginia Alliance	(United States) Sporting Kansas City II
78	New England Revolution	PASS	—N/a	—N/a	—N/a	—N/a	—N/a	—N/a
79	FC Dallas (Note: No. 79: Minnesota United → FC Dallas. January 21, 2020: FC Dallas acquired a third-round selection in the 2021 SuperDraft from Minnesota United FC in exchange for midfielder Jacori Hayes.)	(United States) Giovanni Montesdeoca	FW	North Carolina	ACC	FC Dallas	Denton Diablos	(United States) Loudoun United
80	Seattle Sounders FC	(United States) TJ Bush	GK	James Madison	CAA	Southwestern Strikers	GPS Portland Phoenix	(United States) Charlotte Independence
81	New York Red Bulls (Note: No. 81: Columbus Crew → Inter Miami → New York Red Bulls. August 14, 2020: Inter Miami CF acquired a third-round selection in the 2021 SuperDraft from Columbus Crew SC in exchange for defender Grant Lillard. On December 23, 2020, New York Red Bulls acquired this pick in exchange for Patrick Seagrist.)	PASS	—N/a	—N/a	—N/a	—N/a	—N/a	—N/a

=== Compensatory picks ===
The draft was shortened to three rounds, from four rounds as in prior years. Compensatory picks were awarded to clubs that had acquired fourth round picks via earlier trades.

P	MLS team	Player	Pos.	College	Conference	Academy team	Amateur team	Signed
82	Sporting Kansas City (Note: No. 82: Atlanta United → Sporting Kansas City. December 10, 2017: Sporting Kansas City acquired a fourth-round selection in the 2021 SuperDraft, forward Kenwyne Jones, and goalkeeper Alexander Tambakis from Atlanta United FC in exchange for a second-round selection in the 2018 MLS SuperDraft, midfielder Kévin Oliveira, and defender Tyler Pasher. The traded picks were both natural selections.)	PASS	—N/a	—N/a	—N/a	—N/a	—N/a	—N/a
83	Inter Miami CF (Note: No. 83: Vancouver Whitecaps FC → Inter Miami. January 29, 2020: Inter Miami CF acquired a fourth-round selection in the 2021 SuperDraft from Vancouver Whitecaps FC in exchange for goalkeeper Bryan Meredith. The traded pick was Vancouver's natural selection.)	PASS	—N/a	—N/a	—N/a	—N/a	—N/a	—N/a
84	Real Salt Lake (Note: No. 84: Colorado Rapids → Real Salt Lake. February 19, 2018: Real Salt Lake acquired a fourth-round selection in the 2021 SuperDraft from Colorado Rapids in exchange for the MLS rights to midfielder Enzo Martínez.)	(United States) Rene White	FW	NJIT	America East	TSF Academy	Lionsbridge FC	
85	Inter Miami CF (Note: No. 85: New England Revolution → Inter Miami. September 8, 2020: New England Revolution reacquired midfielder Lee Nguyen from Inter Miami CF in exchange for a fourth-round selection in the 2021 SuperDraft and up to $50,000 in general allocation money.)	PASS	—N/a	—N/a	—N/a	—N/a	—N/a	—N/a
86	Nashville SC (Note: No. 86: Minnesota United → Nashville. September 18, 2020: Minnesota United FC acquired goalkeeper Adrian Zendejas in exchange for a fourth-round selection in the 2021 SuperDraft and up to $100,000 in general allocation money if he meets certain performance-based metrics for Minnesota.)	(Kenya) Leroy Enzugusi	FW	Drake	MVC	Sporting Kansas City	Lansing United	

Signed with club prior to the 2021 MLS SuperDraft

== 2021 SuperDraft trades ==
Round 1

Round 2

Round 3

Compensatory picks

== Notable undrafted players ==
=== Homegrown players ===
Original MLS team	Player	Position	College	Conference	Notes	Ref.
Atlanta United FC	(South Sudan) Machop Chol	MF	Wake Forest	ACC		
New York City FC	(United States) Andres Jasson	FW	Yale	Ivy		
Columbus Crew	(United States) Isaiah Parente	MF	Wake Forest	ACC		

=== Players who signed outside of MLS ===
This is a list of eligible players who signed in leagues outside of MLS prior to the SuperDraft

Player	Nat.	Position	College	Conference	Team	League	Notes	Ref.
Francois Dulysse	HAI	DF	Manhattan College	MAAC	New England Revolution II	USL League One	Drafted by New England Revolution	
Mitch Guitar	USA	MF	Wisconsin	Big Ten	Indy Eleven	USL Championship	Signed for 2020 season Drafted by Chicago Fire FC	
Sean O'Hearn	USA	DF	Georgetown	Big East	New England Revolution II	USL League One	Drafted by Minnesota United FC	
Aedan Stanley	USA	DF	Duke	ACC	Sporting Kansas City II	USL Championship	Drafted by Austin FC	
Alex Touche	ENG	DF	Penn	Ivy	New Mexico United	USL Championship	Undrafted	

=== Other notable players ===
Player	Pos	Affiliation	Played in MLS	Notes
Will Pulisic	GK	Duke	2021–2022	

== Summary ==
=== Selections by college athletic conference ===
Conference	Round 1	Round 2	Round 3	Comp.	Total
NCAA Division I conferences
ACC	12	9	4	0	25
America East	0	1	0	1	2
American	2	1	2	0	5
Atlantic 10	0	1	0	0	1
Big East	2	1	2	0	5
Big South	0	0	1	0	1
Big Ten	3	5	3	0	11
Big West	2	1	1	0	4
CAA	0	1	2	0	3
Conference USA	1	0	1	0	2
Horizon	0	0	1	0	1
Ivy	0	1	0	0	1
MAAC	0	1	0	0	1
Mid-American	1	0	0	0	1
Missouri Valley	0	0	0	1	1
Pac-12	3	3	0	0	6
Summit	1	1	0	0	2
Sun Belt	0	0	2	0	2
NCAA Division III conference
NESCAC	0	0	1	0	1
Passes
Pass	0	1	7	3	11

=== Schools with multiple draft selections ===
Selections	Schools
5	Virginia
4	Georgetown
3	Clemson, North Carolina, Ohio State, SMU, Wake Forest
2	Denver, James Madison, Louisville, Maryland, Michigan, South Florida, Virginia Tech, Washington
