= Mark Winhoffer =

Filipino footballer

Personal information
- Full name: Mark Anthony Almeda Winhoffer
- Date of birth: 1 March 1999 (age 27)
- Height: 1.83 m (6 ft 0 in)
- Position: Midfielder

Team information
- Current team: North Carolina Tar Heels
- Number: 38

Youth career
- St. Charles North High School
- Campton United
- 2012–2017: International School Manila
- 2012–2015: Global
- 2017: Sockers FC

College career
Years	Team	Apps	(Gls)
2017–2020	Yale Bulldogs	47	(8)
2021–	North Carolina Tar Heels		

Senior career*
Years	Team	Apps	(Gls)
2015–2016	Global	5	(1)
2021	ADT	0	(0)

International career^{‡}
2013	Philippines U15		
2016	Philippines U19	4	(1)
2019	Philippines U22	3	(0)
2021	Philippines U23	2	(0)
2021–	Philippines	3	(0)
- * Club domestic league appearances and goals as of 01:48, 26 August 2021 (UTC) ‡ National team caps and goals as of 9:42, 16 June 2021 (UTC)

Mark Anthony Almeda Winhoffer (born 1 March 1999) is a footballer who plays as a midfielder for the North Carolina Tar Heels of the Atlantic Coast Conference (NCAA Division I). Born in the United States, he plays for the Philippines national team.

== Early career ==
=== High school ===
Winhoffer played for International School Manila in the Interscholastic Association of Southeast Asian Schools (IASAS) for three years. He won the golden boot in his sophomore year, and was the IASAS most valuable player (MVP) in his junior year. He was the top assist provider in each of his three seasons there, with a total of 46, and scored a total of 30 goals. He then graduated from St. Charles North High School in St. Charles, Illinois.

=== Youth ===
During his time in the Philippines, he was a youth player for Global. He also played for Sockers FC when he was in the Chicago area.

== College career ==
=== Yale ===
Winhoffer played college soccer for the Yale University Bulldogs. In his first year, he was the only rookie to feature in every game. In the 2019 season, Yale won the Ivy League title, and Winhoffer was named the Offensive Player of the Year (the first Yale player to win the award) and was also among the First Team Honorees. The following season, he became Yale's team captain, but the season was cancelled due to the COVID-19 pandemic.

=== University of North Carolina ===
In August 2021, as a graduate student, he joined the North Carolina Tar Heels.

== Club career ==
=== Global ===
Winhoffer and teammate Marco Casambre were among the youth players promoted to the first-team squad of Global for the 2015 United Football League (UFL) season. On 7 May 2016, he came on as a second-half substitute and scored in their 8–0 thrashing of Laos. Global won the 2016 UFL cup and league titles.

=== Azkals Development Team ===
In mid-2021, he reportedly joined the Azkals Development Team (ADT) of the Philippines Football League (PFL).

== International career ==
Winhoffer represented the Philippines U-15 team at the Football Association of Malaysia-Frenz ASEAN Champions Trophy in 2013. In 2016, he played for Philippines U-19 in the China-ASEAN International Youth Football Tournament and AFF U-19 Youth Championship, scoring once against Vietnam U-19 in the latter. He then represented Philippines U-22 at the 2019 AFF U-22 Youth Championship, and Philippines U-23 at the 2022 AFC U-23 Asian Cup qualifiers.

He made his debut for the senior national team as a second-half substitute in their 2–0 World Cup qualifier loss to China PR on 7 June 2021.

== Personal life ==
Winhoffer was born on 1 March 1999. His father, Ernest Winhoffer, played collegiate soccer for the Fordham Rams and Mercy Mavericks. His mother, Mariels Almeda Winhoffer, was born and raised in Manila. She moved to Illinois as a teenager and eventually graduated from Fordham University (finance and computer science) and worked for IBM. Mark has three siblings: Nicole, Ernest Jr., and Michael—who also played soccer for Fordham. The Winhoffers lived in St. Charles, Illinois until 2012, when they moved to the Philippines as Mariels became the president and country general manager of IBM Philippines. Mark lived in the Philippines for 5 years and studied at International School Manila before moving back to St. Charles.

Winhoffer studied economics at Yale University. He was named twice in the Fall Academic All-Ivy League selection, a distinction for Ivy League student-athletes with grade point averages (GPAs) of 3.00 or higher. He graduated in May 2021.

== Honors ==
Yale Bulldogs

- Ivy League Men's Soccer: 2019

Global

- United Football League: 2016
- United Football League Cup: 2016

Individual

- Ivy League Men's Soccer Offensive Player of the Year: 2019
- Ivy League Men's Soccer All-Conference First Team: 2019
