= 2020 New York City FC season =

New York City FC
2020 season
- Head coach: Ronny Deila
- Stadium: Yankee Stadium (The Bronx, New York); Red Bull Arena (Temporary) (Harrison, New Jersey)
- MLS: Conference: 5th Overall: 7th
- MLS Cup Playoffs: First round
- U.S. Open Cup: Canceled
- CONCACAF Champions League: Quarter-finals
- MLS is Back Tournament: Quarter-finals
- Biggest win: +4 goals: NYC 4–0 CIN (Sept. 26)
- Biggest defeat: –4 goals: UANL 4–0 NYC (Dec. 15)
| Home colors | Away colors |

The 2020 New York City FC season was the club's sixth season of competition and its sixth in the top tier of American soccer, Major League Soccer. New York City FC usually played its home games at Yankee Stadium in the New York City borough of The Bronx. However, the 2020 MLS season saw the club play several of their home games at Red Bull Arena in Harrison, New Jersey due to scheduling conflicts at both Yankee Stadium and Citi Field as well as winterization procedures during the 2020 CONCACAF Champions League which were unavoidable.

The club's season began on February 20, 2020, with their CONCACAF Champions League fixture against San Carlos.

== Player movement ==
=== In ===
Per Major League Soccer and club policies, terms of the deals do not get disclosed.

| No. | Pos. | Player | Transferred from | Fee/notes | Date | Source |
|---|---|---|---|---|---|---|
| 24 | DF | (United States) Tayvon Gray | (United States) New York City FC | Promoted from the Academy | November 26, 2019 | |
| 55 | MF | (United States) Keaton Parks | (Portugal) Benfica | Made permanent by the Club | January 8, 2020 | |
| 23 | MF | (United States) Gedion Zelalem | (United States) Sporting Kansas City | Free transfer | January 8, 2020 | |
| 20 | DF | (Iceland) Guðmundur Þórarinsson | (Sweden) Norrköping | Free transfer | January 10, 2020 | |
| 26 | MF | (Uruguay) Nicolás Acevedo | (Uruguay) Liverpool Montevideo | Undisclosed | March 2, 2020 | |

=== Out ===
Per Major League Soccer and club policies, terms of the deals do not get disclosed.

| No. | Pos. | Player | Transferred to | Fee/notes | Date | Source |
|---|---|---|---|---|---|---|
| 80 | MF | (United States) Justin Haak | (United States) Hartford Athletic | Loan out | September 9, 2020 | |
| 21 | MF | (Colombia) Dan Bedoya | (Dominican Republic) Atlético Pantoja | Option declined | November 20, 2019 | |
| | GK | (United States) Jeff Caldwell | (United States) New England Revolution | Option declined | November 20, 2019 | |
| 5 | DF | (United States) Eric Miller | (United States) Nashville SC | Option declined | November 20, 2019 | |
| 19 | DF | (Somalia) Abdi Mohamed | (United States) Greenville Triumph | Option declined | November 20, 2019 | |
| 12 | MF | (Ghana) Ebenezer Ofori | (Germany) VfB Stuttgart | Loan return | November 20, 2019 | |
| 2 | DF | (United States) Ben Sweat | (United States) Inter Miami CF | Expansion pick | November 20, 2019 | |

== Roster ==
As of November 4, 2020

| Squad No. | Name | Nationality | Position(s) | Since | Date of birth (age) | Signed from | Games played | Goals scored |
Goalkeepers
| 1 | Sean Johnson | (United States) | GK | 2016 | May 31, 1989 (age 36) | (United States) Chicago Fire FC | 129 | 0 |
| 13 | Luis Barraza | (United States) | GK | 2019 | November 8, 1996 (age 29) | (United States) Chicago FC United | 0 | 0 |
| 41 | Brad Stuver | (United States) | GK | 2018 | April 16, 1991 (age 34) | (United States) Columbus | 11 | 0 |
Defenders
| 3 | Anton Tinnerholm | (Sweden) | RB | 2018 | February 26, 1991 (age 35) | (Sweden) Malmö | 98 | 9 |
| 4 | Maxime Chanot | (Luxembourg) | CB | 2016 | January 21, 1990 (age 36) | (Belgium) Kortrijk | 110 | 5 |
| 6 | Alexander Callens | (Peru) | CB | 2017 | May 4, 1992 (age 33) | (Spain) Numancia | 124 | 7 |
| 20 | Guðmundur Þórarinsson | (Iceland) | LB | 2020 | April 15, 1992 (age 33) | (Sweden) IFK Norrköping | 21 | 0 |
| 22 | Rónald Matarrita | (Costa Rica) | LB | 2016 | July 9, 1994 (age 31) | (Costa Rica) Alajuelense | 121 | 4 |
| 24 | Tayvon Gray | (United States) | CB | 2017 | August 19, 2002 (age 23) | (United States) New York City Academy | 0 | 0 |
| 25 | Joseph Scally | (United States) | RB | 2018 | December 31, 2002 (age 23) | (United States) New York City Academy | 9 | 0 |
| 33 | Sebastien Ibeagha | (United States) | CB | 2018 | January 21, 1992 (age 34) | (United States) San Antonio | 63 | 0 |
Midfielders
| 8 | Alexander Ring (captain) | (Finland) | CM | 2017 | April 9, 1991 (age 34) | (Germany) Kaiserslautern | 125 | 10 |
| 10 | Maximiliano Moralez | (Argentina) | AM | 2017 | February 27, 1987 (age 39) | (Mexico) León | 120 | 24 |
| 14 | Juan Pablo Torres | (United States) | DM | 2019 | July 6, 1999 (age 26) | (Belgium) Lokeren | 9 | 0 |
| 15 | Tony Rocha | (United States) | CM | 2019 | August 21, 1993 (age 32) | (United States) Orlando City SC | 31 | 1 |
| 16 | James Sands | (United States) | DM | 2017 | July 6, 2000 (age 25) | (United States) New York Soccer Club | 45 | 0 |
| 23 | Gedion Zelalem | (United States) | CM | 2020 | January 26, 1997 (age 29) | (United States) Sporting Kansas City | 1 | 0 |
| 26 | Nicolás Acevedo | (Uruguay) | DM | 2020 | April 14, 1999 (age 26) | (Uruguay) Liverpool Montevideo | 15 | 0 |
| 55 | Keaton Parks | (United States) | CM | 2019 | August 6, 1997 (age 28) | (Portugal) Benfica | 54 | 6 |
Forwards
| 9 | Héber | (Brazil) | CF | 2019 | August 10, 1991 (age 34) | (Croatia) Rijeka | 47 | 16 |
| 11 | Valentín Castellanos | (Argentina) | CF | 2018 | October 3, 1998 (age 27) | (Uruguay) Atlético Torque | 73 | 19 |
| 17 | Gary Mackay-Steven | (Scotland) | LW / RW | 2019 | August 31, 1990 (age 35) | (Scotland) Aberdeen | 37 | 3 |
| 19 | Jesús Medina | (Paraguay) | RW / AM | 2018 | April 30, 1997 (age 28) | (Paraguay) Libertad | 78 | 15 |
| 28 | Alexandru Mitriță | (Romania) | LW / AM | 2019 | February 8, 1995 (age 31) | (Romania) Universitatea Craiova | 51 | 18 |
| 29 | Ismael Tajouri-Shradi | (Libya) | RW | 2018 | March 28, 1994 (age 31) | Austria Wien | 72 | 22 |

- Included the caps in the 2 games of the knockout stage in the "MLS is Back Tournament".

== Competitions ==
=== Preseason ===
| January 15 1 | New York City FC | 1–2 | Corinthians | Orlando, FL |
| 6:00 PM EST | Méndez 75' (o.g.) | Report | Luan 10', 30' | Stadium: Exploria Stadium |

| January 18 2 | New York City FC | 1–2 | Palmeiras | Orlando, FL |
| EST | De Rosario 45+2' | Report | Willian 56', 73' | Stadium: Exploria Stadium |

| January 31 3 | Los Angeles FC | 3–1 | New York City FC | Los Angeles, CA |
| EST | Rodríguez 23'; A. Perez 31'; Gonzalez 60' | Report | De Rosario 73' | Stadium: Banc of California Stadium |

| February 4 4 | Orange County SC | 1–2 | New York City FC | Long Beach, CA |
| 4:00 PM EST | Ohanyan | Report | Jasson, | Stadium: George Allen Field |

| February 13 5 | Miami FC | 0–0 | New York City FC | Boca Raton, FL |
| EST | | Report | | Stadium: Florida Atlantic University |

| February 6 | Inter Miami CF | v | New York City FC | Boca Raton, FL |
| EST | | | | Stadium: TBD |

=== MLS ===
==== League tables ====
===== Eastern Conference =====
| Pos | Team | Pld | W | L | T | GF | GA | GD | Pts | PPG | Qualification |
|---|---|---|---|---|---|---|---|---|---|---|---|
| 3 | Columbus Crew SC | 23 | 12 | 6 | 5 | 36 | 21 | +15 | 41 | 1.78 | MLS Cup First Round |
| 4 | Orlando City SC | 23 | 11 | 4 | 8 | 40 | 25 | +15 | 41 | 1.78 | MLS Cup First Round |
| 5 | New York City FC | 23 | 12 | 8 | 3 | 37 | 25 | +12 | 39 | 1.70 | MLS Cup First Round |
| 6 | New York Red Bulls | 23 | 9 | 9 | 5 | 29 | 31 | −2 | 32 | 1.39 | MLS Cup First Round |
| 7 | Nashville SC (Note: On June 10, 2020, Major League Soccer announced that Nashville SC would switch from the Western Conference to the Eastern Conference for the remainder of the 2020 season.) | 23 | 8 | 7 | 8 | 24 | 22 | +2 | 32 | 1.39 | MLS Cup Play-in Round |

Source: MLS
Rules for classification: 1) points per game; 2) total wins per match played; 3) total goal differential per match played; 4) total goals scored per match played; 5) fewest disciplinary points per match played; 6) away goal differential per away match played; 7) away goals scored per away match played; 8) home goal differential per home match played; 9) home goals scored per home match played; 10) coin toss or drawing of lots.

===== Overall =====
2020 MLS overall standings
| Pos | Team | Pld | W | L | T | GF | GA | GD | Pts | PPG | Qualification |
|---|---|---|---|---|---|---|---|---|---|---|---|
| 5 | Orlando City SC | 23 | 11 | 4 | 8 | 40 | 25 | +15 | 41 | 1.78 | Leagues Cup |
| 6 | Seattle Sounders FC | 22 | 11 | 5 | 6 | 44 | 23 | +21 | 39 | 1.77 | Leagues Cup |
| 7 | New York City FC | 23 | 12 | 8 | 3 | 37 | 25 | +12 | 39 | 1.70 | Leagues Cup |
| 8 | Portland Timbers (M) | 23 | 11 | 6 | 6 | 46 | 35 | +11 | 39 | 1.70 | CONCACAF Champions League |
| 9 | Minnesota United FC | 21 | 9 | 5 | 7 | 36 | 26 | +10 | 34 | 1.62 | |

Source: MLS
Rules for classification: 1) points per game; 2) total wins per match played; 3) total goal differential per match played; 4) total goals scored per match played; 5) fewest disciplinary points per match played; 6) away goal differential per away match played; 7) away goals scored per away match played; 8) home goal differential per home match played; 9) home goals scored per home match played; 10) coin toss or drawing of lots.
(M) MLS is Back Tournament champions

===== Match results =====
| March 1 1 | Columbus Crew SC | 1–0 | New York City FC | Columbus, OH |
| 12:30 PM EST | Wormgoor (yellow card) 10'; Santos (yellow card) 20'; Artur (yellow card) 53'; Zelarayán 56'; Harrison (yellow card) 77' | Report | Chanot (red card) 3'; Héber (yellow card) 31' | Stadium: Mapfre Stadium; Attendance: 17,473; Referee: Ramy Touchan |

| March 7 2 | Toronto FC | 1–0 | New York City FC | Toronto, ON |
| 5:00 PM EST | Achara 81'; Auro Jr. (yellow card) 87' | Report | Ring (yellow card) 22'; Sands (yellow card) 35'; Parks (yellow card) 69' | Stadium: BMO Field; Attendance: 26,171; Referee: Ted Unkel |

| July 9 3 MLSiBT Group stage | New York City FC | 0–1 | Philadelphia Union | Bay Lake, FL |
| 9:00 AM EDT | | Report | Bedoya 63' | Stadium: ESPN Wide World of Sports Complex; Attendance: 0 (closed door); Referee: Armando Villarreal |
Note: Group stage match of the MLS is Back Tournament that counts towards regular season standings.

| July 14 4 MLSiBT Group stage | New York City FC | 1–3 | Orlando City SC | Bay Lake, FL |
| 8:00 PM EDT | Castellanos (yellow card) 18'; Sands (yellow card) 37'; Medina 38'; Ring (yellow card) 52' | Report | Mueller 4', 10'; Jansson (yellow card) 22'; Moutinho (yellow card) 56'; Gallese (yellow card) 73'; Pereyra (yellow card) 79'; Akindele 81' | Stadium: ESPN Wide World of Sports Complex; Attendance: 0 (closed door); Referee: Robert Sibiga |
Note: Group stage match of the MLS is Back Tournament that counts towards regular season standings.

| July 20 5 MLSiBT Group stage | Inter Miami CF | 0–1 | New York City FC | Bay Lake, FL |
| 9:00 AM EDT | Agudelo (yellow card) 19' (yellow-red card) 90'; Figal (yellow card) 41' | Report | Sands (yellow card) 23'; Chanot (yellow card) 39'; Tinnerholm (yellow card) 45+3'; Tajouri-Shradi 64' | Stadium: ESPN Wide World of Sports Complex; Attendance: 0 (closed door); Referee: Rosendo Mendoza |
Note: Group stage match of the MLS is Back Tournament that counts towards regular season standings.

| August 20 6 Hudson River Derby | New York Red Bulls | 1–0 | New York City FC | Harrison, NJ |
| 7:00 PM EDT | Duncan 59' | Report | | Stadium: Red Bull Arena; Attendance: 0 Referee: Allen Chapman |

| August 24 7 | New York City FC | 1–0 | Columbus Crew SC | Harrison, NJ |
| 7:00 PM EDT | Héber (yellow card) 22'; Ring 59'; Medina (yellow card) 67' | Report | | Stadium: Red Bull Arena; Attendance: 0 Referee: Nima Saghafi |

| August 29 8 | New York City FC | 3–1 | Chicago Fire FC | Harrison, NJ |
| 6:30 EDT | Parks 16'; Sands (yellow card) 36'; Tinnerholm 53'; Ring 75'; Callens (yellow card) 83' | Report | Frankowski (yellow card) 42'; Pineda 45+2'; Calvo (yellow card) 90+1' | Stadium: Red Bull Arena; Attendance: 0 Referee: Rubiel Vazquez |

| September 2 9 | New England Revolution | 0–2 | New York City FC | Foxborough, MA |
| 8:00 PM EDT | Bunbury (yellow card) 40'; Rowe (yellow card) 76' | Report | Parks (yellow card) 33'; Mancienne 60' (o.g.); Héber 72'; Callens (yellow card) 83' | Stadium: Gillette Stadium; Attendance: 0 Referee: Armando Villarreal |

| September 6 10 | D.C. United | 0–0 | New York City FC | Washington, D.C. |
| 7:00 PM EDT | Segura (yellow card) 16' | Report | Tinnerholm (yellow card) 76' | Stadium: Audi Field; Attendance: 0 Referee: Ted Unkel |

| September 12 11 | New York City FC | 2–1 | FC Cincinnati | Harrison, NJ |
| 7:30 PM EDT | Ring 39'; Tinnerholm 55'; Sands (yellow card) 78'; Chanot (yellow card) 84' | Report | Waston (yellow card) 52'; Vázquez 74'; Deplagne (yellow card) 90+5' | Stadium: Red Bull Arena; Attendance: 0 Referee: Rubiel Vazquez |

| September 19 12 | New England Revolution | 0–0 | New York City FC | Foxborough, MA |
| 4:30 PM EDT | | Report | Ring (yellow card) 22'; Scally (yellow card) 47'; Parks (yellow card) 54'; Thórarinsson (yellow card) 64'; Callens (yellow card) 67'; Castellanos (yellow card) 80' | Stadium: Gillette Stadium; Attendance: 0 Referee: Ramy Touchan |

| September 23 13 | New York City FC | 0–1 | Toronto FC | Harrison, NJ |
| 7:00 p.m. ET | Callens (yellow card) 23'; Castellanos (yellow card) 36'; Sands (yellow card) 72'; Acevedo (yellow card) 89' | Report | Piatti (yellow card) 25'; DeLeon (yellow card) 40'; Altidore (yellow card) 56'; Nelson (yellow card) 64'; Pozuelo 90' (pen.) | Stadium: Red Bull Arena; Attendance: 0 Referee: Joseph Dickerson |

| September 26 14 | New York City FC | 4–0 | FC Cincinnati | Harrison, NJ |
| 7:00 p.m. ET | Mitriță 1', 43'; Tinnerholm 25'; Callens (yellow card) 34'; Matarrita (yellow card) 61'; Castellanos (yellow card) 78'; Medina 88' | Report | Waston (yellow card) 64'; Medunjanin (yellow card) 71' | Stadium: Red Bull Arena; Attendance: 0 Referee: Armando Villarreal |

| October 3 15 | Inter Miami CF | 2–3 | New York City FC | Fort Lauderdale, FL |
| 8:00 p.m. ET | Pírez (yellow card) 25'; Morgan 27', 38'; Trapp (yellow card) 47'; Pellegrini (yellow card) 72' | Report | Mitriță 4', 43'; Tinnerholm 35'; Ibeagha (yellow card) 75'; Chanot (yellow card) 90+1'; Mackay-Steven (yellow card) 90+2' | Stadium: Inter Miami CF Stadium; Attendance: 0 Referee: Jair Marrufo |

| October 7 16 | New York City FC | 4–1 | D.C. United | New York, NY |
| 8:15pm ET | Castellanos 4' (pen.), (yellow card) 81'; Tajouri-Shradi 55' (pen.), 63'; Parks 88' | Report | Kamara 12' (pen.) | Stadium: Yankee Stadium; Attendance: 0 Referee: Drew Fischer |

| October 11 17 | New York City FC | 1–2 | New England Revolution | New York, NY |
| 4:30 p.m. ET | Callens 90+3' | Report | Teal Bunbury 3'; Lee Nguyen (yellow card) 45', (goal) 80' (pen.); Scott Caldwell (yellow card) 58'; Kelyn Rowe (yellow card) 76'; DeJuan Jones (yellow card) 83' | Stadium: Yankee Stadium; Attendance: 0 Referee: Armando Villarreal |

| October 14 18 | Orlando City SC | 1–1 | New York City FC | Orlando, FL |
| 7:30 p.m. ET | Carlos (yellow card) 3'; Mueller 18'; Jansson (yellow card) 37'; Miller (yellow card) 53' | Report | Ring (yellow card) 5'; Parks 43', (yellow card) 82'; Tinnerholm (yellow card) 45+5' | Stadium: Exploria Stadium; Attendance: 2,745; Referee: Silviu Petrescu |

| October 18 19 | Columbus Crew SC | 3–1 | New York City FC | Columbus, OH |
| 7:30 p.m. ET | Artur 26'; Santos 50'; Díaz (yellow card) 82'; Zardes 90+3' | Report | Ring (yellow card) 10'; Castellanos 55', (yellow card) 84'; Chanot (yellow card) 90+1' | Stadium: Mapfre Stadium; Attendance: 1,500; Referee: Alex Chilowicz |

| October 24 20 | New York City FC | 3–1 | Montreal Impact | New York, NY |
| 7:30 p.m. ET | Tinnerholm (yellow card) 68'; Medina 68'; Moralez 83'; Rocha 86'; Matarrita (yellow card) 89' | Report | Quioto 89' | Stadium: Yankee Stadium; Attendance: 0 Referee: Ramy Touchan |

| October 28 21 | Toronto FC | 0–1 | New York City FC | East Hartford, CT |
| 7:30 p.m. ET | Morrow (yellow card) 3' | Report | Callens (yellow card) 45+1'; Medina 51', (yellow card) 90+2'; Castellanos (yellow card) 75' | Stadium: Pratt & Whitney Stadium; Attendance: 0 Referee: Nima Saghafi |

| November 1 22 Hudson River Derby | New York City FC | 5–2 | New York Red Bulls | New York, NY |
| 7:00 PM EST | Castellanos 12', 76', 84' (pen.); Mackay-Steven 42'; Ring 51'; Parks (yellow card) 68'; Medina (yellow card) 70' | Report | White 18'; Cásseres Jr. 38'; Duncan (yellow card) 41' | Stadium: Yankee Stadium; Attendance: 0 Referee: Joseph Dickerson |

| November 8 23 | Chicago Fire FC | 3–4 | New York City FC | Chicago, IL |
| 3:30 p.m. ET | Berić 33'; Frankowski 42', 43' | Report | Callens 15'; Mackay-Steven 32'; Medina 37'; Castellanos 77' | Stadium: Soldier Field; Attendance: 0 Referee: Fotis Bazakos |

===== MLS Cup Playoffs =====
| November 21 First round | Orlando City SC | 1–1 (a.e.t.) (6–5 p) | New York City FC | Orlando, FL |
| 12:00 PM | Nani 5' (pen.); Carlos (yellow card) 71'; Ruan (yellow card) 77' (red card) 87'; Jansson (yellow card) 90+4'; Perea (yellow card) 90+6'; Gallese (yellow card) 103' (yellow-red card) SO' | Report | Chanot 8'; Castellanos (yellow card) 70'; Mackay-Steven (yellow card) 88'; Ibeagha (yellow card) 120+2' | Stadium: Exploria Stadium; Attendance: 6,250; Referee: Allen Chapman |
| | Penalties |
| | Akindele (penalty scored); Perea (penalty scored); Carlos (penalty scored); Urso (penalty scored); Nani (penalty missed); Jansson (penalty scored); Michel (penalty scored) | | (penalty missed) Moralez; (penalty scored) Medina; (penalty scored) Rocha; (penalty scored) Tajouri-Shradi; (penalty scored) Castellanos; (penalty scored) Acevedo; (penalty missed) Þórarinsson |

=== U.S. Open Cup ===
Due to their final standings for the 2019 season, the NYCFC were scheduled to enter the competition in the Fourth Round, to be played May 19–20. The ongoing coronavirus pandemic, however, forced the U.S. Soccer Federation to cancel the tournament on August 17, 2020.

=== CONCACAF Champions League ===
==== Round of 16 ====
| February 20 First leg | San Carlos (Costa Rica) | 3–5 | (United States) New York City FC | San Carlos, Costa Rica |
| 8:00 PM EST | Aguilar 45'; Mena 63', (yellow card) 72'; Browne 79' | Report | Héber 13', 35', 52' (pen.), (yellow card) 38'; Callens 61'; Castellanos (yellow card) 65'; Mitriță (yellow card) 77', (goal) 90+3' | Stadium: Estadio Carlos Ugalde Álvarez; Referee: César Arturo Ramos (Mexico) |

| February 26 Second leg | New York City FC (United States) | 1–0 (6–3 agg.) | (Costa Rica) San Carlos | Harrison, United States |
| 6:00 PM EST | Callens 41' | Report | Meza (yellow card) 39'; Arboine (yellow card) 82'; Cruz (yellow card) 87' | Stadium: Red Bull Arena (Note: Due to unavoidable winterization procedures at their home stadium Yankee Stadium as well as back up stadium Citi Field, the match was played in Red Bull Arena.); Attendance: 4,396; Referee: John Pitti (Panama) |

==== Quarter-finals ====
| March 11 First leg | New York City FC (United States) | 0–1 | (Mexico) UANL | Harrison, United States |
| 8:00 PM EDT | Medina (yellow card) 85' | Report | Vargas 90+3' | Stadium: Red Bull Arena; Attendance: 10,212; Referee: Juan Gabriel Calderón (Costa Rica) |

| December 15 Second leg | UANL (Mexico) | 4–0 (5–0 agg.) | (United States) New York City FC | Orlando, United States |
| 10:30 PM EST | Gignac 30'; Dueñas (yellow card) 35'; Fernández 49'; Carioca 64'; Pizarro (yellow card) 75'; Aquino 85' | Report | Mackay-Steven (yellow card) 37'; Castellanos (yellow card) 61'; Medina (yellow card) 69' | Stadium: Exploria Stadium; Attendance: 0 Referee: Daneon Parchment (Jamaica) |
Note: Postponed due to the COVID-19 pandemic. The match was originally scheduled to take place at Estadio Universitario, San Nicolás de los Garza on March 17, 2020 (8:00 PM UTC−6).

=== MLS is Back Tournament ===
==== Group A ====
Group A results
| Pos | Team | Pld | W | D | L | GF | GA | GD | Pts | Qualification |
|---|---|---|---|---|---|---|---|---|---|---|
| 1 | Orlando City SC (H) | 3 | 2 | 1 | 0 | 6 | 3 | +3 | 7 | Advanced to knockout stage |
| 2 | Philadelphia Union | 3 | 2 | 1 | 0 | 4 | 2 | +2 | 7 | Advanced to knockout stage |
| 3 | New York City FC | 3 | 1 | 0 | 2 | 2 | 4 | −2 | 3 | Advanced to knockout stage |
| 4 | Inter Miami CF | 3 | 0 | 0 | 3 | 2 | 5 | −3 | 0 | |

Source: MLS
(H) Hosts

| July 9 1 | New York City FC | 0–1 | Philadelphia Union | Bay Lake, FL |
| 9:00 AM EDT | | Report | Bedoya 63' | Stadium: ESPN Wide World of Sports Complex; Attendance: 0 (closed door); Referee: Armando Villarreal |
Note: Group stage match of the MLS is Back Tournament that counts towards regular season standings.

| July 14 2 | New York City FC | 1–3 | Orlando City SC | Bay Lake, FL |
| 8:00 PM EDT | Castellanos (yellow card) 18'; Sands (yellow card) 37'; Medina 38'; Ring (yellow card) 52' | Report | Mueller 4', 10'; Jansson (yellow card) 22'; Moutinho (yellow card) 56'; Gallese (yellow card) 73'; Pereyra (yellow card) 79'; Akindele 81' | Stadium: ESPN Wide World of Sports Complex; Attendance: 0 (closed door); Referee: Robert Sibiga |

| July 20 3 | Inter Miami CF | 0–1 | New York City FC | Bay Lake, FL |
| 9:00 AM EDT | Agudelo (yellow card) 19' (yellow-red card) 90'; Figal (yellow card) 41' | Report | Sands (yellow card) 23'; Chanot (yellow card) 39'; Tinnerholm (yellow card) 45+3'; Tajouri-Shradi 64' | Stadium: ESPN Wide World of Sports Complex; Attendance: 0 (closed door); Referee: Rosendo Mendoza |

==== Knockout stage ====
| July 26 Round of 16 | Toronto FC | 1–3 | New York City FC | Bay Lake, FL |
| 8:30 PM EDT | Gonzalez (yellow card) 15'; Osorio (yellow card) 83'; Mullins 87' | Report | Medina 5'; Ring (yellow card) 12'; Castellanos 55'; Sands (yellow card) 66'; Moralez 81' | Stadium: ESPN Wide World of Sports Complex; Attendance: 0 (closed door); Referee: Alex Chilowicz |

| August 1 Quarterfinal | New York City FC | 1–3 | Portland Timbers | Bay Lake, FL |
| 10:30 PM EDT | Medina 27' (pen.) | Report | Blanco 43'; Valeri 65'; Polo 76' | Stadium: ESPN Wide World of Sports Complex; Attendance: 0 (closed door); Referee: Allen Chapman |

== Statistics ==
=== Appearances and goals ===
Last updated on November 21, 2020

- (Only the 3 games of the "MLS is Back Tournament", also valid for the MLS regular season, are considered).

| No. | Pos | Nat | Player | Total | | MLS | | MLS Cup Playoffs | | U.S. Open Cup | | CONCACAF Champions League | |
| No. | Pos | Nat | Player | Apps | Goals | Apps | Goals | Apps | Goals | Apps | Goals | Apps | Goals |
Goalkeepers
| 1 | GK | (United States) USA | Sean Johnson | 27 | 0 | 23 | 0 | 1 | 0 | 0 | 0 | 3 | 0 |
| 13 | GK | (United States) USA | Luis Barraza | 1 | 0 | 0 | 0 | 0 | 0 | 0 | 0 | 1 | 0 |
| 41 | GK | (United States) USA | Brad Stuver | 0 | 0 | 0 | 0 | 0 | 0 | 0 | 0 | 0 | 0 |
Defenders
| 3 | DF | (Sweden) SWE | Anton Tinnerholm | 28 | 4 | 22+1 | 4 | 1 | 0 | 0 | 0 | 4 | 0 |
| 4 | DF | (Luxembourg) LUX | Maxime Chanot | 25 | 1 | 20 | 0 | 1 | 1 | 0 | 0 | 4 | 0 |
| 6 | DF | (Peru) PER | Alexander Callens | 27 | 4 | 22 | 2 | 1 | 0 | 0 | 0 | 4 | 2 |
| 22 | DF | (Costa Rica) CRC | Rónald Matarrita | 26 | 0 | 19+2 | 0 | 1 | 0 | 0 | 0 | 4 | 0 |
| 24 | DF | (United States) USA | Tayvon Gray | 0 | 0 | 0 | 0 | 0 | 0 | 0 | 0 | 0 | 0 |
| 25 | DF | (United States) USA | Joseph Scally | 6 | 0 | 1+3 | 0 | 0+1 | 0 | 0 | 0 | 0+1 | 0 |
| 33 | DF | (United States) USA | Sebastien Ibeagha | 10 | 0 | 3+4 | 0 | 0+1 | 0 | 0 | 0 | 0+2 | 0 |
Midfielders
| 8 | MF | (Finland) FIN | Alexander Ring | 27 | 4 | 23 | 4 | 1 | 0 | 0 | 0 | 3 | 0 |
| 10 | MF | (Argentina) ARG | Maximiliano Moralez | 16 | 1 | 13 | 1 | 1 | 0 | 0 | 0 | 2 | 0 |
| 14 | MF | (United States) USA | Juan Pablo Torres | 2 | 0 | 0+2 | 0 | 0 | 0 | 0 | 0 | 0 | 0 |
| 15 | MF | (United States) USA | Tony Rocha | 12 | 0 | 0+10 | 0 | 0+1 | 0 | 0 | 0 | 0+1 | 0 |
| 16 | MF | (United States) USA | James Sands | 19 | 0 | 16 | 0 | 0 | 0 | 0 | 0 | 3 | 0 |
| 19 | MF | (Paraguay) PAR | Jesús Medina | 26 | 5 | 22 | 5 | 1 | 0 | 0 | 0 | 3 | 0 |
| 20 | MF | (Iceland) ISL | Gudmundur Thorarinsson | 21 | 0 | 7+12 | 0 | 0+1 | 0 | 0 | 0 | 0+1 | 0 |
| 23 | MF | (United States) USA | Gedion Zelalem | 1 | 0 | 0+1 | 0 | 0 | 0 | 0 | 0 | 0 | 0 |
| 26 | MF | (Uruguay) URU | Nicolás Acevedo | 14 | 0 | 1+11 | 0 | 0+1 | 0 | 0 | 0 | 1 | 0 |
| 55 | MF | (United States) USA | Keaton Parks | 27 | 3 | 20+3 | 3 | 1 | 0 | 0 | 0 | 2+1 | 0 |
| 21 | MF | (United States) USA | Andres Jasson | 1 | 0 | 0 | 0 | 0 | 0 | 0 | 0 | 0+1 | 0 |
Forwards
| 9 | FW | (Brazil) BRA | Héber | 14 | 4 | 11+1 | 1 | 0 | 0 | 0 | 0 | 2 | 3 |
| 11 | FW | (Argentina) ARG | Valentín Castellanos | 27 | 6 | 14+8 | 6 | 1 | 0 | 0 | 0 | 2+2 | 0 |
| 17 | FW | (Scotland) SCO | Gary Mackay-Steven | 25 | 2 | 11+11 | 2 | 1 | 0 | 0 | 0 | 1+1 | 0 |
| 28 | FW | (Romania) ROU | Alexandru Mitriță | 15 | 5 | 8+4 | 4 | 0 | 0 | 0 | 0 | 3 | 1 |
| 29 | FW | (Libya) LBY | Ismael Tajouri-Shradi | 19 | 3 | 6+9 | 3 | 0+1 | 0 | 0 | 0 | 2+1 | 0 |
Players who have made an appearance or had a squad number this season but have left the club
