= Jesús Medina =

Paraguayan footballer (born 1997)

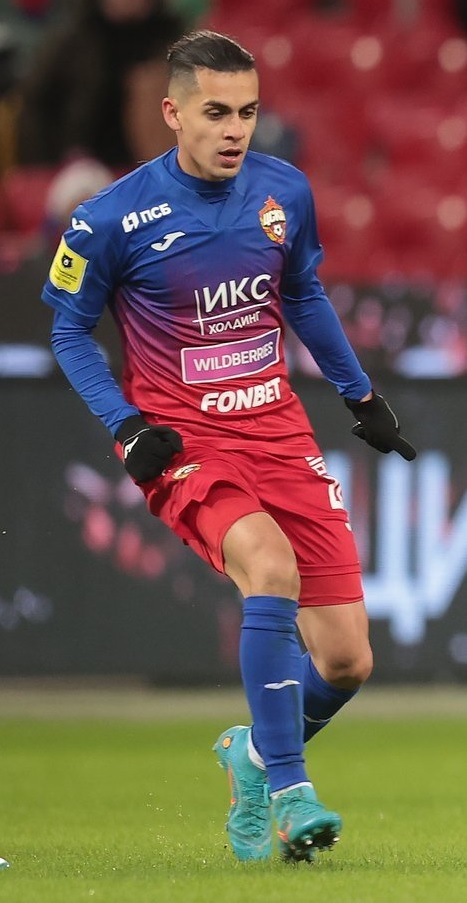
- Medina with CSKA Moscow in 2022

Personal information
- Full name: Jesús Manuel Medina Maldonado
- Date of birth: 30 April 1997 (age 29)
- Place of birth: Asunción, Paraguay
- Height: 1.78 m (5 ft 10 in)
- Positions: Winger; attacking midfielder

Team information
- Current team: Atlético San Luis
- Number: 28

Youth career
- 2010–2016: Libertad

Senior career*
Years	Team	Apps	(Gls)
2012–2017	Libertad	74	(17)
2018–2021	New York City FC	101	(23)
2022–2023	CSKA Moscow	35	(9)
2023–2025	Spartak Moscow	42	(6)
2025–2026	Damac	12	(1)
2026–	Atlético San Luis	6	(1)

International career^{‡}
2013	Paraguay U17	15	(7)
2015–2017	Paraguay U20	11	(4)
2017–	Paraguay	9	(0)
- * Club domestic league appearances and goals as of 7 May 2026 ‡ National team caps and goals as of 27 March 2023

Jesús Manuel Medina Maldonado (born 30 April 1997) is a Paraguayan professional footballer who plays for Liga MX club Atlético San Luis and the Paraguay national team.

== Club career ==
Medina made his senior debut as a 15-year-old for Libertad on 7 July 2012 in a 1–0 win over Club Rubio Ñu.

On 31 December 2017, it was announced that Medina was signing with Major League Soccer (MLS) side New York City FC ahead of their 2018 season. Medina ultimately played over a hundred MLS games. However, after a disappointing 2021 season, New York City opted to decline their contract option on Medina.

On 17 January 2022, he signed a contract with Russian Premier League (RPL) club CSKA Moscow until the end of the 2024–25 season.

In July 2023, there were reports in the press about the imminent transition of Medina to Spartak Moscow. The fee for the transfer, which led to significant media attention due to CSKA and Spartak being rivals, was estimated to be between 7 million and 7.5 million euros. On 10 July 2023, Spartak formally announced the transfer and Medina signed a three-year contract. On 5 August 2023, Medina scored within the first 40 seconds of making his debut after coming on as a substitute in what was eventually a 1-4 win over Rubin Kazan. This was the quickest goal by any player in their debut in RPL history.

On 6 September 2025, Medina signed with Damac in Saudi Arabia.

== International career ==
=== Paraguay U17 and U20 ===
Medina was part of the Paraguay U17 squad for the 2013 South American Under-17 Football Championship, scoring four times as the team finished fifth.

He was also named to the Paraguay U20 squad for the 2015 and 2017 South American Youth Football Championships (CONMEBOL U-20 Championship). In the 2015 tournament, he scored a goal in a 4–2 win over Bolivia U20 in the group stage, and in the 2017 tournament he scored twice in a 3–2 group stage loss to Brazil U20.

=== Paraguay ===
He was named in the senior team's provisional squad for Copa América Centenario, but was cut from the final squad. On 1 July 2017, Medina made his debut for Paraguay in a friendly match against Mexico, coming in as a substitute in the 85th minute.

== Personal life ==
In February 2019, Medina earned a U.S. green card which qualifies him as a domestic player for MLS roster purposes.

== Career statistics ==
=== Club ===
As of match played on 18 May 2025

Appearances and goals by club, season and competition
Club	Season	League			Domestic Cup		Continental		Other		Total	
Club	Season	Division	Apps	Goals	Apps	Goals	Apps	Goals	Apps	Goals	Apps	Goals
Libertad	2012	Paraguayan Primera División	1	0	—		—		—		1	0
Libertad	2016	Paraguayan Primera División	38	9	—		1	0	—		39	9
Libertad	2017	Paraguayan Primera División	35	8	—		13 (Note: 5 appearances and 1 goal in Copa Libertadores and 8 appearances and 1 goal in Copa Sudamerica)	2	—		48	10
Libertad	Total		74	17	0	0	14	2	0	0	88	19
New York City FC	2018	Major League Soccer	28	6	1	0	—		2 (Note: Appearance(s) in MLS Cup Playoffs)	0	31	6
New York City FC	2019	Major League Soccer	18	3	2	1	—		0	0	20	4
New York City FC	2020	Major League Soccer	22	5	—		4 (Note: Appearance(s) in CONCACAF Champions League)	0	3 (Note: Two appearances and one goal in MLS is Back Tournament knockout stage, one appearance in MLS Cup Playoffs)	2	29	7
New York City FC	2021	Major League Soccer	33	9	—		1 (Note: Appearance in 2021 Leagues Cup)	0	4	0	38	9
New York City FC	Total		101	23	3	1	5	0	9	0	118	26
CSKA Moscow	2021–22	Russian Premier League	10	1	2	0	—		—		12	1
CSKA Moscow	2022–23	Russian Premier League	25	8	8	3	—		—		33	11
CSKA Moscow	Total		35	9	10	3	0	0	0	0	45	12
Spartak Moscow	2023–24	Russian Premier League	24	5	10	0	—		—		34	5
Spartak Moscow	2024–25	Russian Premier League	18	1	6	2	—		—		24	3
Spartak Moscow	Total		42	6	16	2	—		—		58	8
Career total			252	55	29	6	19	2	9	2	309	65

=== International ===
As of match played on 27 March 2023

Appearances and goals by national team and year
National team	Year	Apps	Goals
Paraguay	2017	1	0
Paraguay	2022	7	0
Paraguay	2023	1	0
Total		9	0

== Honours ==
New York City FC

- MLS Cup: 2021

CSKA Moscow

- Russian Cup: 2022–23

== See also ==
- Players and Records in Paraguayan Football
