= 2021 New York City FC season =

New York City FC
2021 season
- Head coach: Ronny Deila
- Stadium: Yankee Stadium (The Bronx, New York); Red Bull Arena (Temporary) (Harrison, New Jersey)
- MLS: Conference: 4th Overall: 8th
- MLS Cup Playoffs: Champions
- U.S. Open Cup: Canceled
- Leagues Cup: Quarter-finals
- Biggest win: NYC 6–0 DC (10/23)
- Biggest defeat: NSH 3–1 NYC (9/3)
Home colors	Away colors

The 2021 New York City FC season was the club's seventh season of competition and its seventh in the top tier of American soccer, Major League Soccer. New York City FC usually played its home games at Yankee Stadium in the New York City borough of The Bronx. Like the 2020 MLS season, the club also played several of their home games at Red Bull Arena in Harrison, New Jersey due to scheduling conflicts with Yankee Stadium and its backup stadium, Citi Field. New York City FC won the clubs' first MLS Cup title by defeating the Portland Timbers 2–4 in penalty shoot-outs with a 1–1 score before going into extra time, in which neither of the teams scored.

In addition to the MLS season, the club also competed in the Leagues Cup for the first time, finishing up in the quarter-finals after losing to UNAM in a penalty shoot-out.

== Player movement ==
=== In ===
No.	Pos.	Player	Transferred from	Fee/notes	Date	Source
12	DF	(Denmark) Malte Amundsen	(Denmark) Vejle BK	Signed on permanent transfer	February 12, 2021	
21	MF	(United States) Andres Jasson	(United States) Yale Bulldogs	Homegrown Contract	November 19, 2020	
25	GK	(United States) Cody Mizell	(United States) New Mexico United	Transfer	March 4, 2021	
23	MF	(United States) Gedion Zelalem	(United States) New York City FC	Re-sign	March 8, 2021	
2	DF	(United States) Chris Gloster	(Netherlands) Jong PSV	Transfer	March 22, 2021	
7	MF	(United States) Alfredo Morales	(Germany) Fortuna Düsseldorf	Transfer	April 7, 2021	
8	FW	(Brazil) Thiago Andrade	(Brazil) Esporte Clube Bahia	Transfer	April 10, 2021	
32	DF	(Serbia) Vuk Latinovich	(United States) Chicago FC United	2021 MLS SuperDraft	May 1, 2021	
43	MF	(Brazil) Talles Magno	(Brazil) CR Vasco da Gama	Transfer	May 19, 2021	
42	MF	(Uruguay) Santiago Rodríguez	(Uruguay) Montevideo City Torque	Loan	June 10, 2021	

=== Out ===
No.	Pos.	Player	Transferred to	Fee/notes	Date	Source
	DF	(United States) Joe Scally	(Germany) Borussia Mönchengladbach	$2 million	September 9, 2020	
	MF	(Finland) Alexander Ring	(United States) Austin FC	$1.25 million in General Allocation Money	December 17, 2020	
	DF	(Costa Rica) Rónald Matarrita	(United States) FC Cincinnati	$500,000 of General Allocation Money	December 29, 2020	
	FW	(Scotland) Gary Mackay-Steven	(Scotland) Heart of Midlothian	Free transfer	January 8, 2021	
	GK	(United States) Brad Stuver	(United States) Austin FC	Free transfer	December 28, 2020	
	FW	(Romania) Alexandru Mitriță	(Saudi Arabia) Al-Ahli	Loan	October 8, 2020	
	GK	(United States) Mason Stajduhar	(United States) Orlando City SC	Loan return	November 20, 2019	

== Roster ==
Squad No.	Name	Nationality	Position(s)	Since	Date of birth (age)	Signed from	Games played	Goals
Goalkeepers
1	Sean Johnson (captain)	(United States)	GK	2017	May 31, 1989 (age 36)	Chicago Fire FC	163	0
13	Luis Barraza	(United States)	GK	2019	November 8, 1996 (age 29)	Chicago FC United	5	0
25	Cody Mizell	(United States)	GK	2021	September 30, 1991 (age 34)	New Mexico United	0	0
Defenders
3	Anton Tinnerholm	(Sweden)	RB	2018	February 26, 1991 (age 35)	Malmö	123	9
4	Maxime Chanot	(Luxembourg)	CB	2016	November 21, 1989 (age 36)	Kortrijk	144	5
6	Alexander Callens	(Peru)	CB	2017	May 4, 1992 (age 33)	Numancia	155	9
20	Guðmundur Þórarinsson	(Iceland)	LB	2020	April 15, 1992 (age 33)	IFK Norrköping	49	2
2	Chris Gloster	(United States)	LB	2020	July 28, 2000 (age 25)	Jong PSV	6	0
24	Tayvon Gray	(United States)	CB	2017	August 19, 2002 (age 23)	New York City Academy	15	0
5	Sebastien Ibeagha	(United States)	CB	2021	January 21, 1992 (age 34)	San Antonio	71	0
32	Vuk Latinovich	(Serbia)	CB	2021	September 14, 1997 (age 28)	Chicago Football United	3	0
12	Malte Amundsen	(Denmark)	CB	2018	February 11, 1998 (age 28)	Vejle	36	1
Midfielders
10	Maximiliano Moralez	(Argentina)	AM	2017	February 27, 1987 (age 39)	León	155	28
43	Talles Magno Bacelar Martins	(Brazil)	AM	2021	June 26, 2002 (age 23)	Vasco da Gama	18	3
42	Santiago Rodríguez	(Uruguay)	AM	2021	January 8, 2000 (age 26)	Montevideo City Torque	26	4
23	Gedion Zelalem	(United States)	CM	2020	January 26, 1997 (age 29)	Sporting Kansas City	8	0
14	Juan Pablo Torres	(United States)	DM	2019	July 26, 1999 (age 26)	Lokeren	9	0
7	Alfredo Morales	(United States)	DM	2021	May 12, 1990 (age 35)	Fortuna Düsseldorf	32	0
15	Tony Rocha	(Belize)	CM	2019	August 21, 1993 (age 32)	Orlando City SC	38	1
16	James Sands	(United States)	DM	2017	July 6, 2000 (age 25)	New York Soccer Club	76	0
26	Nicolás Acevedo	(Uruguay)	DM	2020	April 14, 1999 (age 26)	Liverpool Montevideo	40	0
55	Keaton Parks	(United States)	CM	2019	August 6, 1997 (age 28)	Benfica	86	10
80	Justin Haak	(United States)	CM	2019	September 12, 2001 (age 24)	New York Soccer Club	3	0
Forwards
9	Héber	(Brazil)	CF	2019	August 10, 1991 (age 34)	Rijeka	55	16
8	Thiago Andrade	(Brazil)	LW	2021	October 31, 2000 (age 25)	Esporte Clube Bahia	23	4
11	Valentín Castellanos	(Argentina)	CF	2018	October 3, 1998 (age 27)	Montevideo City Torque	109	42
19	Jesús Medina	(Paraguay)	RW / AM	2018	April 30, 1997 (age 28)	Libertad	116	24
21	Andres Jasson	(United States)	LW	2020	January 17, 2002 (age 24)	New York Soccer Club	21	0
17	Ismael Tajouri-Shradi	(Libya)	RW	2018	March 28, 1994 (age 31)	Austria Wien	99	29

== Non-competitive ==
=== Preseason ===
March 13	Chicago Fire FC	2–1	New York City FC	Citrus Ridge, Florida
12:00 EST	Berić 14'; Collier 54'	Report	Calvo 1' (o.g.)	Stadium: ChampionsGate Sports Complex; Attendance: 0

March 18	Orlando City SC	2–3	New York City FC	Kissimmee, Florida
11:00 EDT	Jansson 43'; Pato 65'	Report	Castellanos 7' (pen.), 67'; Medina 39' (pen.)	Stadium: Osceola County Stadium; Attendance: 0

March 24	Columbus Crew	0–3	New York City FC	St. Petersburg, Florida
19:00 EDT		Report	Medina 3'; Moralez 65'; Tajouri-Shradi 86'	Stadium: Al Lang Stadium; Attendance: 0

March 27	New York City FC	Cancelled	Nashville SC	St. Petersburg, Florida
13:00 EDT		Report		Stadium: Al Lang Stadium
Note: The match was cancelled due to health and safety concerns.

April 4	D.C. United	1–2	New York City FC	Chester, Pennsylvania
15:00 EDT	Smith 29' (Flores); Moreno (red card) 44'	Report	Castellanos 25' (Þórarinsson), (red card) 44'; Jasson 50'	Stadium: Power Training Complex

April 10	New York City FC	2–0	Hartford Athletic	Orangeburg, New York
12:00 EDT	Medina 40', 44'	Recap		Stadium: Etihad City Football Academy

== Competitive ==
=== Major League Soccer ===
==== Standings ====
===== Eastern Conference =====
Pos	Team	Pld	W	L	T	GF	GA	GD	Pts	Qualification
2	Philadelphia Union	34	14	8	12	48	35	+13	54	MLS Cup First Round
3	Nashville SC	34	12	4	18	55	33	+22	54	MLS Cup First Round
4	New York City FC	34	14	11	9	56	36	+20	51	MLS Cup First Round
5	Atlanta United FC	34	13	9	12	45	37	+8	51	MLS Cup First Round
6	Orlando City SC	34	13	9	12	50	48	+2	51	MLS Cup First Round

Source: MLS
Rules for classification: 1) points; 2) total wins; 3) total goal differential; 4) total goals scored; 5) fewer disciplinary points; 6) away goal differential; 7) away goals scored; 8) home goals differential; 9) home goals scored; 10) coin toss (2 clubs tied) or drawing of lots (≥3 clubs tied)

===== Overall table =====
Pos	Team	Pld	W	L	T	GF	GA	GD	Pts	Qualification
6	Philadelphia Union	34	14	8	12	48	35	+13	54	
7	Nashville SC	34	12	4	18	55	33	+22	54	
8	New York City FC (C)	34	14	11	9	56	36	+20	51	CONCACAF Champions League
9	Atlanta United FC	34	13	9	12	45	37	+8	51	
10	Orlando City SC	34	13	9	12	50	48	+2	51	

Source: MLS
Rules for classification: 1) points; 2) total wins; 3) total goal differential; 4) total goals scored; 5) fewer disciplinary points; 6) away goal differential; 7) away goals scored; 8) home goals differential; 9) home goals scored; 10) coin toss (2 clubs tied) or drawing of lots (≥3 clubs tied)
(C) MLS Cup champions

==== Results summary ====
Overall								Home						Away					
Pld	Pts	W	L	T	GF	GA	GD	W	L	T	GF	GA	GD	W	L	T	GF	GA	GD
34	51	14	11	9	56	36	+20	10	3	4	37	13	+24	4	8	5	19	23	−4

Source: MLS standings
Pld = Matches played; Pts = Points; W = Matches won; T = Matches tied; L = Matches lost; GF = Goals for; GA = Goals against; GD = Goal difference

==== Results by round ====
Round	1	2	3	4	5	6	7	8	9	10	11	12	13	14	15	16	17	18	19	20	21	22	23	24	25	26	27	28	29	30	31	32	33	34
Stadium	A	H	A	A	H	H	A	H	H	H	A	A	H	H	H	A	A	H	A	H	A	A	H	A	A	H	A	H	A	A	H	H	A	H
Result	L	W	W	D	D	L	W	L	W	W	L	L	W	W	W	D	D	W	L	W	L	L	D	W	D	L	L	D	L	D	W	W	W	D

Source: NYCFC schedule
A = Away; H = Home; W = Win; D = Draw; L = Loss

==== Results ====
April 17 1	D.C. United	2–1	New York City FC	Washington, D.C.
8:00 PM EDT	Brillant (yellow card) 9'; Hines-Ike 39'; Canouse 44'; Gressel (yellow card) 77'	Report	Castellanos 15', (yellow card) 74'; Tinnerholm (yellow card) 82'	Stadium: Audi Field; Attendance: 4,500; Referee: Ted Unkel

April 24 2	New York City FC	5–0	FC Cincinnati	New York, New York
8:00 PM EDT	Medina 7', 83'; Hagglund 54' (o.g.); Thórarinsson (yellow card) 50', (goal) 57'; Castellanos (yellow card) 60', (goal) 67'	Report	Harris (yellow card) 10'; Cruz (yellow card) 56'	Stadium: Yankee Stadium; Attendance: 9,000; Referee: David Gantar

May 1 3	Philadelphia Union	0–2	New York City FC	Chester, Pennsylvania
7:30 PM EDT	Martínez (red card) 16'; Monteiro (yellow card) 38'	Report	Medina 5'; Morales (yellow card) 18'; Ibeagha (yellow card) 25'; Moralez (yellow card) 45+2'; Castellanos 65'	Stadium: Subaru Park; Referee: Ismail Elfath

May 8 4	Orlando City SC	1–1	New York City FC	Orlando, Florida
6:00 PM EDT	Smith (yellow card) 34'; Nani 52'	Report	Sands (yellow card) 64'; Castellanos 77'	Stadium: Exploria Stadium; Attendance: 11,503; Referee: Robert Sibiga

May 15 5	New York City FC	1–1	Toronto FC	New York, New York
1:00 PM EDT	Acevedo (yellow card) 30'; Jasson (yellow card) 42'; Medina 53'	Report	Mavinga (yellow card) 65'; Shaffelburg 74'	Stadium: Yankee Stadium; Referee: David Gantar

May 22 6	New York City FC	1–2	Columbus Crew	Harrison, New Jersey
7:30 PM EDT	Tajouri-Shradi 18'; Chanot (yellow card) 89'; Ibeagha (yellow card) 90+4'	Report	Santos (yellow card) 25'; Artur (yellow card) 46'; Zelarayán 82', 90+5'	Stadium: Red Bull Arena; Attendance: 3,154; Referee: Drew Fischer

May 29 7	Los Angeles FC	1–2	New York City FC	Los Angeles, California
6:00 PM EDT	Atuesta (yellow card) 48'; Baird 56'	Report	Medina (yellow card) 53', (goal) 70'; Acevedo (yellow card) 65' (yellow-red card) 86'; Tajouri-Shradi 90'	Stadium: Banc of California Stadium; Attendance: 10,703; Referee: Kevin Stott

June 19 8	New York City FC	2–3	New England Revolution	Harrison, New Jersey
7:30 PM EDT	Castellanos (yellow card) 39'; Thiago 55', (yellow card) 56'; Sands (yellow card) 77'; Tajouri-Shradi 85'	Report	Polster (yellow card) 19'; Bou 27'; Maciel (yellow card) 53'; Bell 78'; McNamara 88'	Stadium: Red Bull Arena; Attendance: 4,929; Referee: Allen Chapman

June 23 9	New York City FC	1–0	Atlanta United FC	Harrison, New Jersey
7:30 PM EDT	Tajouri-Shradi 69'	Report	Sosa (yellow card) 12'; Barco (yellow card) 45'; López (yellow card) 55'	Stadium: Red Bull Arena; Attendance: 3,564; Referee: Ismail Elfath

June 27 10	New York City FC	2–1	D.C. United	Harrison, New Jersey
6:00 PM EDT	Parks 84'; Andrade 90+5'	Report	Robertha 9', (yellow card) 70'; Mora (yellow card) 52'; Najar (yellow card) 78'	Stadium: Red Bull Arena; Attendance: 4,533; Referee: Robert Sibiga

July 7 11	CF Montréal	2–1	New York City FC	Orlando, Florida
7:30 PM EDT	Toye 43'; Brault-Guillard (yellow card) 57'	Report	Parks 29'; Ibeagha (yellow card) 70'; Moralez (yellow card) 77'	Stadium: Exploria Stadium; Attendance: 0 Referee: Marcos de Oliveira
Note: Due to travel restrictions, Montreal, at the time, was using DRV PNK Stadium as their home field. However, due to scheduling conflicts with DRV PNK Stadium with the 2021 CONCACAF Gold Cup qualification, the match was played at Exploria Stadium instead. CF Montréal played as the home team for this match.

July 17 12	Columbus Crew	2–1	New York City FC	Columbus, Ohio
7:30 PM EDT	Abdul-Salaam (yellow card) 9'; Hairston (yellow card) 37'; Nagbe 45+3'; Zelarayán 62'; Santos (yellow card) 77'; Francis (yellow card) 79'	Report	Chanot (yellow card) 31'; Medina (yellow card) 34', (goal) 47'; Acevedo (yellow card) 39'; Thórarinsson (yellow card) 51'	Stadium: Lower.com Field; Attendance: 19,113; Referee: Ramy Touchan

July 21 13	New York City FC	1–0	CF Montréal	Harrison, New Jersey
7:30 PM EDT	Tajouri-Shradi 29'; Chanot (yellow card) 62'	Report	Waterman (yellow card) 42'; Hamdi (yellow card) 76'	Stadium: Red Bull Arena; Attendance: 2,873; Referee: Ted Unkel

July 25 14	New York City FC	5–0	Orlando City SC	New York, New York
6:00 PM EDT	Medina 40'; Tajouri-Shradi 53'; Moralez 65'; Acevedo (yellow card) 74'; Amundsen 79'; Castellanos 82'	Report	Carlos (yellow card) 40'; Schlegel (yellow card) 87'	Stadium: Yankee Stadium; Attendance: 13,503; Referee: Rosendo Mendoza

July 30 15	New York City FC	4–1	Columbus Crew SC	New York, New York
6:00 PM EDT	Castellanos 14', (yellow card) 55'; Rodríguez 22'; Thiago 35', (yellow card) 36'; Thórarinsson (yellow card) 41'; Parks 51'; Medina (yellow card) 69'	Report	Santos (yellow card) 49', (goal) 90+7' (pen.)	Stadium: Yankee Stadium; Referee: Alan Kelly

August 4 16	Chicago Fire FC	0–0	New York City FC	Chicago, Illinois
8:00 PM EDT	Kappelhof (yellow card) 90'	Report	Parks (yellow card) 42' (yellow-red card) 73'; Tajouri-Shradi (yellow card) 84'	Stadium: Soldier Field; Attendance: 8,371; Referee: Baldomero Toledo

August 7 17	Toronto FC	2–2	New York City FC	Toronto, Ontario
8:00 PM EDT	Soteldo (yellow card) 25'; Laryea (yellow card) 36', (goal) 49'; Pozuelo 55'; Priso (yellow card) 63'	Report	Rodríguez 12'; Ismael Tajouri-Shradi 21'; Morales (yellow card) 90+2'	Stadium: BMO Field; Attendance: 9,331; Referee: Robert Sibiga

August 14 18	New York City FC	2–0	Inter Miami CF	Harrison, New Jersey
3:30 PM EDT	Amundsen (yellow card) 10'; Castellanos 20', 45+1' (pen.); Parks (yellow card) 66'	Report	Gregore (yellow card) 41'; Leerdam (yellow card) 45+1'; Gibbs (yellow card) 54'	Stadium: Red Bull Arena; Referee: Alex Chilowicz

August 18 19	Philadelphia Union	1–0	New York City FC	Chester, Pennsylvania
7:30 PM EDT	Bedoya 67'; Elliott (yellow card) 78'	Report	Medina (yellow card) 25'; Sands (yellow card) 36'	Stadium: Subaru Park; Attendance: 15,263; Referee: Drew Fischer

August 21	New York Red Bulls	Postponed	New York City FC	Harrison, New Jersey
8:00 PM EDT		Report		Stadium: Red Bull Arena
Note: The match was originally scheduled to kick off at 8:00 PM EDT and was delayed up to 10:42 PM EDT due to a rain delay. After the referees determined that the pitch was unplayable, the match was postponed and was later rescheduled to September 22.

August 28 20	New York City FC	2–0	New England Revolution	New York, New York
7:30 PM EDT	Castellanos 31', 55'; Rodríguez (yellow card) 37'; Sands (yellow card) 40'; Chanot (yellow card) 45+2'; Þórarinsson (yellow card) 87'; Jasson (yellow card) 90+3'	Report	Farrell (yellow card) 45+3'; Polster (yellow card) 86'	Stadium: Yankee Stadium; Referee: Kevin Stott

September 3 21	Nashville SC	3–1	New York City FC	Nashville, Tennessee
8:30 PM EDT	Mukhtar 30', 68', (yellow card) 73'; Latinovich 32' (o.g.); McCarty (red card) 45'; Muyl (yellow card) 71'; Haakenson (yellow card) 89'	Report	Medina (yellow card) 38'; Moralez (red card) 45'; Castellanos (yellow card) 64', (goal) 90'; Acevedo (yellow card) 73'	Stadium: Nissan Stadium; Attendance: 20,126; Referee: Timothy Ford

September 11 22	New England Revolution	2–1	New York City FC	Foxborough, Massachusetts
7:00PM EDT	Boateng 21'; Kessler (yellow card) 63'; Buksa (yellow card) 64'; Buchanan 65'; Polster (yellow card) 90'; Gil (yellow card) 90+3'	Report	Rodríguez 11'; Morales (yellow card) 45+2' (yellow-red card) 53'; Castellanos (yellow card) 52'; Thiago (yellow card) 74'	Stadium: Gillette Stadium; Attendance: 19,481; Referee: Chris Penso

September 14 23	New York City FC	3–3	FC Dallas	Harrison, New Jersey
7:30 PM EDT	Moralez 20'; Medina 57'; Magno 67'; Andrade (red card) 90+2'	Report	Obrian 4', 73'; Ferreira 63'	Stadium: Red Bull Arena; Referee: Joseph Dickerson

September 18 24	FC Cincinnati	1–2	New York City FC	Cincinnati, Ohio
7:30 PM EDT	Brenner 4'; Cameron (yellow card) 48'; Barreal (yellow card) 74', (red card) 85'; Atanga (red card) 90+5'	Report	Tajouri-Shradi (yellow card) 26'; Parks 37'; Castellanos 60' (pen.); Morales (yellow card) 69'; Jasson (yellow card) 77'; Johnson (yellow card) 83'; Callens (yellow card) 90+7'	Stadium: TQL Stadium; Attendance: 21,978; Referee: Ted Unkel

September 22 25	New York Red Bulls	1–1	New York City FC	Harrison, New Jersey
8:00 PM EDT	Davis (yellow card) 45'; Reyes (yellow card) 61'; Klimala (yellow card) 80', (goal) 90+12' (pen.); Duncan (yellow card) 82'; Clark (yellow card) 85'	Report	Callens (yellow card) 24'; Castellanos 31'; Tinnerholm (yellow card) 44'; Parks (red card) 73'; Chanot (yellow card) 84' (yellow-red card) 90+1'	Stadium: Red Bull Arena; Attendance: 16,072; Referee: Ismail Elfath
Note: This match was originally scheduled on August 21 which was postponed due to unsafe pitch conditions after a rain delay.

September 25 26	New York City FC	0–1	New York Red Bulls	New York, New York
8:00PM EDT	Sands (yellow card) 62'; Castellanos (yellow card) 75'	Report	Tolkin (yellow card) 13'; Fernandez 43'; Duncan (yellow card) 85'	Stadium: Yankee Stadium; Referee: Armando Villarreal

September 29 27	Chicago Fire FC	2–0	New York City FC	Bridgeview, Illinois
8:00 PM EDT	Navarro (yellow card) 16'; Beric 48'; Gimenez (yellow card) 59'; Navarro 66'	Report	Medina (yellow card) 10'; Acevedo (yellow card) 27'	Stadium: Seatgeek Stadium; Attendance: 5593; Referee: Baldomero Toledo

October 3 28	New York City FC	0–0	Nashville SC	Harrison, New Jersey
6:00 PM EDT	Moralez (yellow card) 70'; Gray (yellow card) 88'	Report		Stadium: Red Bull Arena; Referee: Marcos de Oliveira

October 17 29	New York Red Bulls	1–0	New York City FC	Harrison, New Jersey
1:00 PM EDT	Cásseres 3'; Nealis (yellow card) 16'; Davis (yellow card) 21'	Report	Chanot (yellow card) 34'; Amundsen (yellow card) 82'	Stadium: Red Bull Arena; Attendance: 18,613; Referee: Jair Marrufo

October 20 30	Atlanta United FC	1–1	New York City FC	Atlanta, Georgia
7:30 PM EDT	Moreno 17'; Franco (yellow card) 60'; Robinson (yellow card) 85'	Report	Moralez (yellow card) 24'; Þórarinsson 90'; Sands (yellow card) 90+3'	Stadium: Mercedes-Benz Stadium; Attendance: 42,511; Referee: Rubiel Vazquez

October 23 31	New York City FC	6–0	D.C. United	New York, New York
7:30 PM EDT	Andrade 1'; Castellanos 7', 11'; Sands (yellow card) 33'; Moralez 43'; Callens 52'; Medina 74'	Report	Canouse (yellow card) 3'; Birnbaum (yellow card) 54'	Stadium: Yankee Stadium; Referee: Joseph Dickerson

October 27 32	New York City FC	1–0	Chicago Fire FC	New York, New York
7:30 PM EDT	Castellanos 51' (pen.), (yellow card) 90+1'	Report	Pineda (yellow card) 32'	Stadium: Yankee Stadium; Referee: Fotis Bazakos

October 30 33	Inter Miami CF	1–3	New York City FC	Fort Lauderdale, Florida
1:30 PM EDT	Shea (yellow card) 29'; Gregore (yellow card) 45+4'; Figal 56'; González Pírez (yellow card) 81'	Report	Castellanos 33', 60'; Callens (yellow card) 52'; Medina (yellow card) 57'; Talles Magno 83'	Stadium: DRV PNK Stadium; Attendance: 17,595; Referee: Rosendo Mendoza

November 7 34	New York City FC	1–1	Philadelphia Union	New York, New York
3:30 PM EST	Zelalem (red card) 21'; Castellanos 53'; Medina (yellow card) 82'	Report	Glesnes (yellow card) 25'; Przybyłko 26'; Wagner (yellow card) 31'; Martínez (yellow card) 50'; Bedoya (yellow card) 85'	Stadium: Yankee Stadium; Referee: Guido Gonzales Jr.

=== MLS Cup Playoffs ===
November 21 First round	New York City FC	2–0	Atlanta United FC	New York, New York
2:00PM EST	Castellanos 49'; Callens 53'	Report	Franco (yellow card) 43' (yellow-red card) 90+3'; Moreno (yellow card) 81'	Stadium: Yankee Stadium; Attendance: 25,267; Referee: Chris Penso

November 30 Eastern Conference Semifinals	New England Revolution	2–2 (a.e.t.) (3–5 p)	New York City FC	Foxborough, Massachusetts
6:30 PM EST	Buksa 9', (yellow card) 54'; Polster (yellow card) 27'; Buchanan 118'	Report	Rodríguez 3', (yellow card) 58'; Morales (yellow card) 84'; Castellanos 109', (yellow card) 18' (yellow-red card) 113'	Stadium: Gillette Stadium; Attendance: 25,509; Referee: Drew Fischer
	Penalties
	Gil (penalty scored); Buksa (penalty missed); Bunbury (penalty scored); Jones (penalty scored)		(penalty scored) Morales; (penalty scored) Andrade; (penalty scored) Tajouri-Shradi; (penalty scored) Moralez; (penalty scored) Callens
Note: New York City FC advance on penalties 5–3.

December 5 Eastern Conference Finals	Philadelphia Union	1–2	New York City FC	Chester, Pennsylvania
3:00PM EST	Callens 63' (o.g.); Monteiro (yellow card) 71'; Mbaizo (yellow card) 75'	Report	Moralez (yellow card) 41', (goal) 65'; Magno 88'	Stadium: Subaru Park; Attendance: 19,487; Referee: Ted Unkel

December 11 MLS Cup 2021	Portland Timbers	1–1 (a.e.t.) (2–4 p)	New York City FC	Portland, Oregon
3:00 PM EST	Mora 90+4'	Report	Castellanos 41'	Stadium: Providence Park; Attendance: 25,218; Referee: Armando Villarreal
	Penalties
	Mora (penalty missed); Valeri (penalty missed); Moreno (penalty scored); Paredes (penalty scored)		(penalty scored) Castellanos; (penalty missed) Morales; (penalty scored) Moralez; (penalty scored) Talles Magno; (penalty scored) Callens

=== U.S. Open Cup ===
On July 20, US Soccer announced that the tournament would be cancelled for 2021 and would resume in 2022.

=== Leagues Cup ===
August 11 Quarterfinals	New York City FC (United States)	1–1 (2–3 p)	(Mexico) UNAM	New York, New York
8:00 PM EDT	Castellanos 61'	Report	Rogério 72'	Stadium: Yankee Stadium; Attendance: 17,276; Referee: Oshane Nation (Jamaica)
	Penalties
	Castellanos (penalty scored); Tajouri-Shradi (penalty missed); Callens (penalty missed); Sands (penalty scored); Moralez (penalty missed)		(penalty missed) Velarde; (penalty missed) Mozo; (penalty scored) Lira; (penalty scored) Galindo; (penalty scored) Saucedo

== Statistics ==
=== Appearances and goals ===
Last updated on December 12, 2021

No.	Pos	Nat	Player	Total		MLS		MLS Cup Playoffs		U.S. Open Cup		2021 Leagues Cup	
No.	Pos	Nat	Player	Apps	Goals	Apps	Goals	Apps	Goals	Apps	Goals	Apps	Goals
Goalkeepers
1	GK	(United States) USA	Sean Johnson	34	0	29	0	4	0	0	0	1	0
13	GK	(United States) USA	Luis Barraza	5	0	5	0	0	0	0	0	0	0
25	GK	(United States) USA	Cody Mizell	0	0	0	0	0	0	0	0	0	0
Defenders
3	DF	(Sweden) SWE	Anton Tinnerholm	25	0	23+2	0	0	0	0	0	0	0
4	DF	(Luxembourg) LUX	Maxime Chanot	34	0	29+1	0	4	0	0	0	0	0
6	DF	(Peru) PER	Alexander Callens	31	2	25+1	1	4	1	0	0	1	0
20	DF	(Iceland) ISL	Guðmundur Þórarinsson	28	2	20+4	2	1+2	0	0	0	1	0
24	DF	(United States) USA	Tayvon Gray	15	0	3+7	0	4	0	0	0	1	0
2	DF	(United States) USA	Chris Gloster	5	0	1+3	0	0	0	0	0	0+1	0
5	DF	(United States) USA	Sebastien Ibeagha	8	0	3+5	0	0	0	0	0	0	0
32	DF	(Serbia) SRB	Vuk Latinovich	3	0	1+2	0	0	0	0	0	0	0
12	DF	(Denmark) DEN	Malte Amundsen	36	1	14+18	1	3+1	0	0	0	0	0
Midfielders
10	MF	(Argentina) ARG	Maximiliano Moralez	35	4	27+3	3	4	1	0	0	1	0
43	MF	(Brazil) BRA	Talles Magno Bacelar Martins	20	3	5+12	2	0+3	1	0	0	0	0
42	MF	(Uruguay) URU	Santiago Rodríguez	26	4	11+10	3	4	1	0	0	1	0
16	MF	(United States) USA	James Sands	31	0	26	0	4	0	0	0	1	0
7	MF	(United States) USA	Alfredo Morales	32	0	20+7	0	4	0	0	0	0+1	0
26	MF	(Uruguay) URU	Nicolás Acevedo	25	0	15+9	0	0	0	0	0	1	0
55	MF	(United States) USA	Keaton Parks	32	4	28+3	4	0	0	0	0	1	0
21	MF	(United States) USA	Andres Jasson	21	0	6+14	0	0+1	0	0	0	0	0
15	MF	(United States) USA	Tony Rocha	7	0	0+5	0	0+2	0	0	0	0	0
23	MF	(United States) USA	Gedion Zelalem	7	0	1+6	0	0	0	0	0	0	0
14	MF	(United States) USA	Juan Pablo Torres	0	0	0	0	0	0	0	0	0	0
80	MF	(United States) USA	Justin Haak	0	0	0	0	0	0	0	0	0	0
Forwards
9	FW	(Brazil) BRA	Héber	8	0	0+7	0	1	0	0	0	0	0
8	FW	(Brazil) BRA	Thiago Andrade	23	4	9+12	4	0+1	0	0	0	0+1	0
11	FW	(Argentina) ARG	Valentín Castellanos	36	23	32	19	3	3	0	0	1	1
17	FW	(Libya) LBY	Ismael Tajouri-Shradi	27	7	14+9	7	0+3	0	0	0	0+1	0
19	FW	(Paraguay) PAR	Jesús Medina	38	9	27+6	9	4	0	0	0	1	0
