= Taty Castellanos =

Argentine footballer (born 1998)

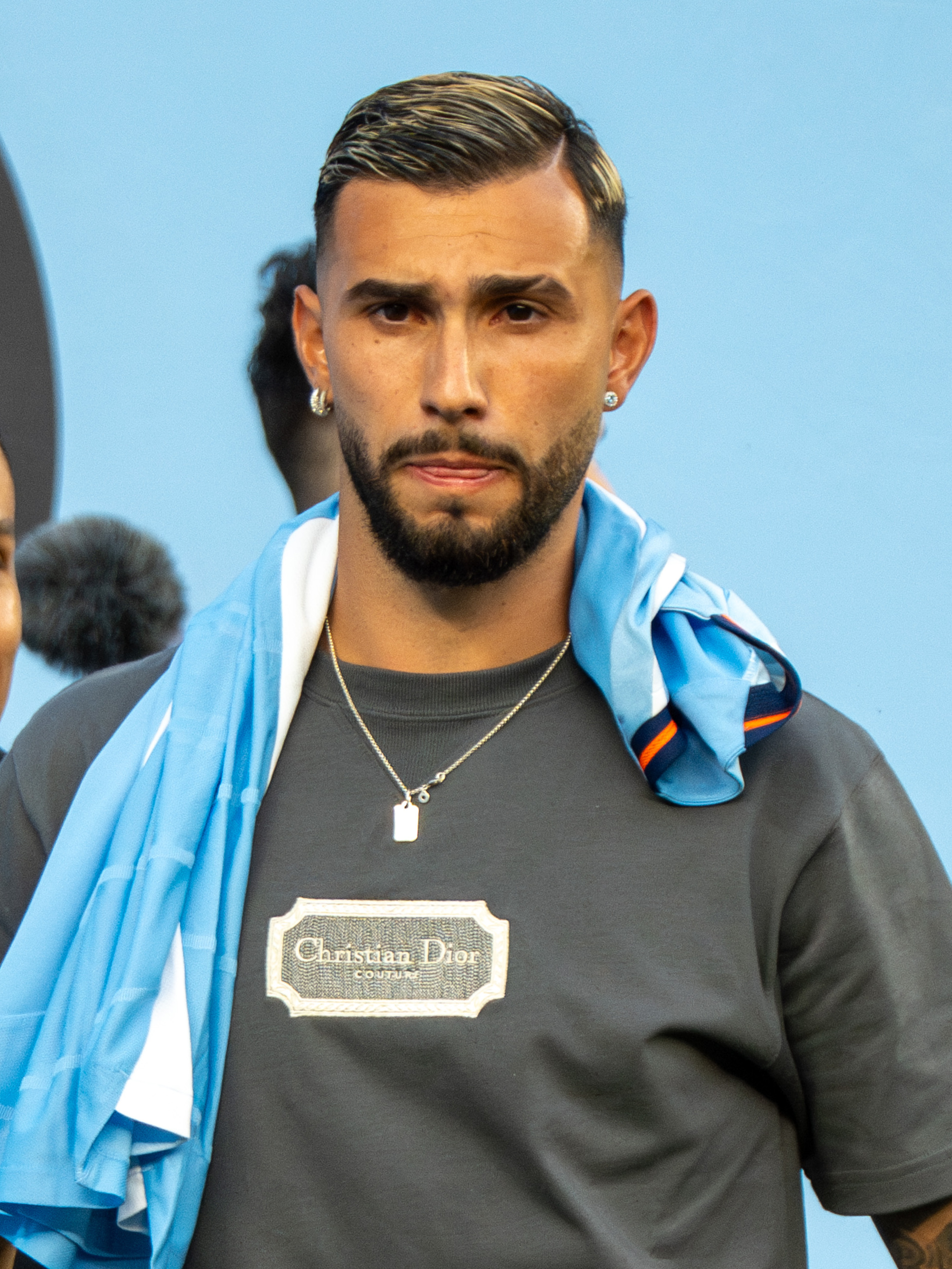
- Castellanos 2022

Personal information
- Full name: Valentín Mariano José Castellanos Giménez
- Date of birth: 3 October 1998 (age 28)
- Place of birth: Mendoza, Argentina
- Height: 1.78 m (5 ft 10 in)
- Position: Forward

Team information
- Current team: West Ham United
- Number: 11

Youth career
- Villa Nueva
- Independiente Rivadavia
- –2015: Leonardo Murialdo
- 2015–2017: Universidad de Chile

Senior career*
Years	Team	Apps	(Gls)
2017–2018	Universidad de Chile	0	(0)
2017–2018	→ Torque (loan)	11	(2)
2018	Torque	12	(2)
2018	→ New York City FC (loan)	8	(1)
2019–2023	New York City FC	101	(49)
2022–2023	→ Girona (loan)	35	(13)
2023–2026	Lazio	75	(16)
2026–	West Ham United	33	(9)

International career^{‡}
2019–2020	Argentina Olympic	8	(0)
2024	Argentina	2	(0)
Medal record
Representing Argentina
CONMEBOL Pre-Olympic Tournament
Winner	2020
- * Club domestic league appearances and goals as of 17:00, 21 November 2026 (UTC) ‡ National team caps and goals as of 14 November 2024

Valentín Mariano José Castellanos Giménez (born 3 October 1998), known as Taty Castellanos, is an Argentine professional footballer who plays as a forward for EFL Championship club West Ham United. He also represented the Argentina national team.

== Club career ==
=== Early career ===
As a youth, Castellanos was rejected by both River Plate and Lanús. Castellanos started his club career in the youth academy of Universidad de Chile. He made his senior team debut in the 2017 Copa Sudamericana against Corinthians playing 14 minutes. He then moved to Torque on a one-year loan in July 2017. While on loan, he scored two goals in 11 appearances and helped the club win the Segunda Division title and secure promotion to Uruguay's top flight. On 1 July 2018, his move from Universidad de Chile to Torque was made permanent.

=== New York City ===
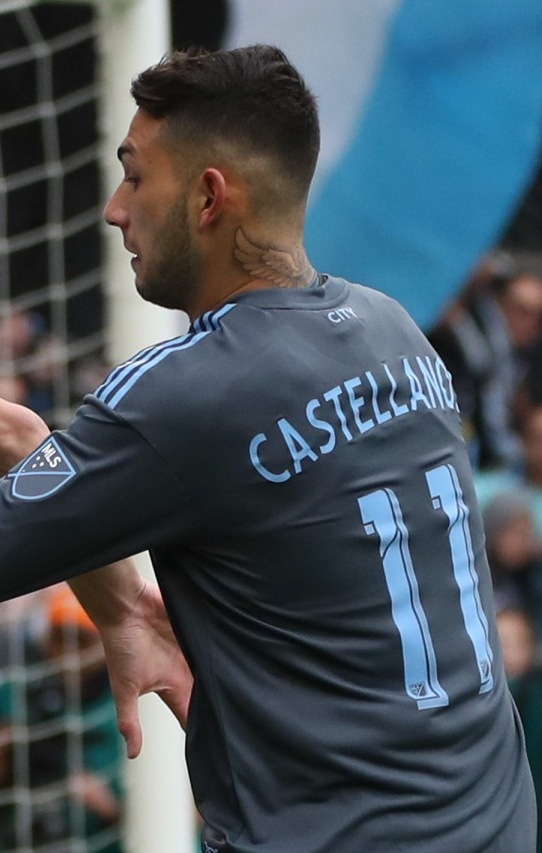
Castellanos playing for New York City FC in 2019

On 27 July 2018, Castellanos joined Major League Soccer side New York City FC on loan until the end of the 2018 season. In his first match with New York City, he started and scored a goal against the Vancouver Whitecaps. NYCFC exercised their option to buy Castellanos on 29 November 2018, ahead of the 2019 season.

In 2019, Castellanos played an integral role in New York City's attack, scoring 11 times and adding seven assists in 30 matches. This form helped NYCFC finish atop the Eastern Conference standings and qualify for their first CONCACAF Champions League.

In 2020, Castellanos declined in his production, scoring six goals and adding three assists in 22 matches during a season shortened by the COVID-19 pandemic. Castellanos suffered from an inability to finish chances as he had an xG/90 of 0.65, but ended the season with G/90 of only 0.40. NYCFC would finish fifth in the Eastern Conference standings. During the first round of the 2020 MLS Cup Playoffs, Castellanos had his initial penalty in a shootout vs. Orlando City saved, but VAR overturned the call due to goalkeeper Pedro Gallese leaving the goal line early. He scored his second penalty, but NYCFC lost 6–5 in the shootout, eliminating them from the playoffs.

Castellanos was able to finish much more consistently during the 2021 season, becoming only the fifth player in MLS history to score in each of their club's first four matches. Shortly after this milestone, on 13 May 2021, Castellanos signed a new deal with NYCFC through 2025. Castellanos again played an integral role in New York City's attack throughout the 2021 season. He significantly improved his G/90 to 0.62 and raised his xG/90 to 0.70 showing improvement in his movement, creation ability, and finishing. He was especially good near the season's conclusion, scoring 12 goals in NYCFC's last 14 matches. During this stretch, he was awarded MLS Player of the Month for August and the NYCFC Player of the Month for both August and September. He ended the season as the team's leading scorer with 19 goals and added eight assists, winning the MLS Golden Boot over DC United's Ola Kamara on the assist tiebreaker. Castellanos also led the league in shots and shots on target with 132 and 57, respectively. Castellanos scored in all three of his 2021 MLS Cup Playoff appearances, including the first goal of the 2021 MLS Cup, which NYCFC won on penalties, giving Castellanos the first domestic trophy of his career.

==== Girona (loan) ====
On 25 July 2022, Castellanos joined newly promoted La Liga club Girona on a season-long loan. On 25 April 2023, he scored four goals for Girona in their 4–2 victory against Real Madrid, making him the first player to score four against Real Madrid in a league match since December 1947, when Esteban Echevarría scored five goals for Oviedo in a 7–1 win.

=== Lazio ===
On 21 July 2023, Castellanos joined Serie A side Lazio for an undisclosed fee. Later that year, on 8 October, he recorded his first goal and assist for the club in a 3–2 victory over Atalanta. During the 2024–25 season, he finished as the club's joint top scorer in Serie A with ten goals, alongside Pedro.

=== West Ham United ===
On 5 January 2026, Castellanos joined Premier League side West Ham United for an undisclosed fee on a four-and-a-half year contract. On 11 January 2026, he scored his first goal for West Ham United and the winning goal in an FA Cup victory over Queens Park Rangers, a header during extra-time.

== International career ==
Castellanos' father is a naturalised Chilean, and through him he was eligible to play for the Chile national team.

In October 2019, Castellanos was called up for the first time to the Argentina national under-23 football team by coach Fernando Batista for two friendly matches against Mexico. However, he debuted during the 2020 CONMEBOL Pre-Olympic Tournament, which Argentina managed to win.

In August 2024, Castellanos received his first call-up for the senior national team for the games against Chile and Colombia for the 2026 FIFA World Cup qualifiers. He debuted on 5 September the same year against the former opponent, coming on as a substitute to Julián Alvarez in the 89th minute that resulted in a 3–0 victory for Argentina.

== Career statistics ==
=== Club ===
As of match played 31 October 2026

Appearances and goals by club, season and competition
Club	Season	League			National cup (Note: Includes U.S. Open Cup, Copa del Rey, Coppa Italia, FA Cup)		League cup (Note: Includes Torneo Intermedio, EFL Cup)		Continental		Other		Total	
Club	Season	Division	Apps	Goals	Apps	Goals	Apps	Goals	Apps	Goals	Apps	Goals	Apps	Goals
Torque (loan)	2017	Uruguayan Segunda División	11	2	0	0	0	0	—		—		11	2
Torque (loan)	2018	Uruguayan Primera División	12	2	0	0	7	1	—		—		19	3
Torque (loan)	Total		23	4	0	0	7	1	—		—		30	5
New York City FC (loan)	2018	MLS	8	1	0	0	—		—		2 (Note: Appearance(s) in MLS Cup playoffs)	0	10	1
New York City FC	2019	MLS	30	11	3	0	—		—		1	0	34	11
New York City FC	2020	MLS	22 (Note: Includes three appearances in MLS is Back Tournament group stage)	6	—		—		4 (Note: Appearances in CONCACAF Champions League)	0	3 (Note: Two appearances and one goal in MLS is Back Tournament knockout stage, one appearance in MLS Cup playoffs)	1	29	7
New York City FC	2021	MLS	32	19	—		—		—		4 (Note: One appearance and one goal in Leagues Cup, three appearances and three goals in MLS Cup playoffs)	4	36	23
New York City FC	2022	MLS	17	13	2	0	—		6	4	—		25	17
New York City FC	Total		101	49	5	0	—		10	4	8	5	124	59
Girona (loan)	2022–23	La Liga	35	13	2	1	—		—		—		37	14
Lazio	2023–24	Serie A	35	4	4	2	—		7 (Note: Appearances in UEFA Champions League)	0	—		46	6
Lazio	2024–25	Serie A	29	10	0	0	—		11 (Note: Appearances in UEFA Europa League)	4	—		40	14
Lazio	2025–26	Serie A	11	2	1	0	—		—		—		12	2
Lazio	Total		75	16	5	2	—		18	4	—		98	22
West Ham United	2025–26	Premier League	18	6	4	1	—		—		—		22	7
West Ham United	2026–27	Championship	12	1	0	0	3	3	—		—		17	4
West Ham United	Total		30	7	4	1	3	3	—		—		39	11
Career total			272	90	14	4	10	4	28	8	10	5	336	112

=== International ===
As of match played 14 November 2024

Appearances and goals by national team and year
National team	Year	Apps	Goals
Argentina	2024	2	0
Total		2	0

== Honours ==
Torque

- Uruguayan Segunda División: 2017

New York City

- MLS Cup: 2021

Argentina Olympic

- CONMEBOL Pre-Olympic Tournament: 2020

Individual

- NYCFC Player of the Month: August 2021, September 2021
- MLS Player of the Month: October/November 2020, August 2021
- MLS Golden Boot: 2021
- MLS Best XI: 2021
