= Connor Drought =

American soccer player

Personal information
- Date of birth: June 14, 2001 (age 25)
- Place of birth: Mukilteo, Washington, United States
- Height: 5 ft 7 in (1.70 m)
- Position: Left back

Team information
- Current team: Cornell Big Red
- Number: 16

Youth career
- 2015–2019: Seattle Sounders FC

College career
Years	Team	Apps	(Gls)
2019–	Cornell Big Red	17	(0)

Senior career*
Years	Team	Apps	(Gls)
2019	Tacoma Defiance	1	(0)
- * Club domestic league appearances and goals as of 08:48, 9 July 2019 (UTC)

Connor Drought (born June 14, 2001) is an American soccer player who plays as a left back for Cornell Big Red.

== Honors ==
- Ivy League Men's Soccer All-Second Team: 2019
