= Lucas Meza =

Argentine footballer

Personal information
- Full name: Lucas Maximiliano Meza
- Date of birth: 10 March 1992 (age 34)
- Place of birth: Buenos Aires, Argentina
- Height: 1.84 m (6 ft 1/2 in)
- Position: Centre-back

Team information
- Current team: Deportes Iquique
- Number: 2

Youth career
- Boca Juniors

Senior career*
Years	Team	Apps	(Gls)
2015–2016	UAI Urquiza	16	(0)
2016–2017	Pérez Zeledón	38	(3)
2017–2018	UAT	16	(0)
2019	Orense SC		
2020	San Carlos	13	(0)
2020–2021	San Telmo	40	(1)
2022–	Deportes Iquique	9	(1)
- * Club domestic league appearances and goals as of 19:10, 31 July 2022 (UTC)

Lucas Maximiliano Meza (born 10 March 1992) is an Argentine footballer who plays as a centre-back for Deportes Iquique.
