= Andres Jasson =

American soccer player (born 2002)

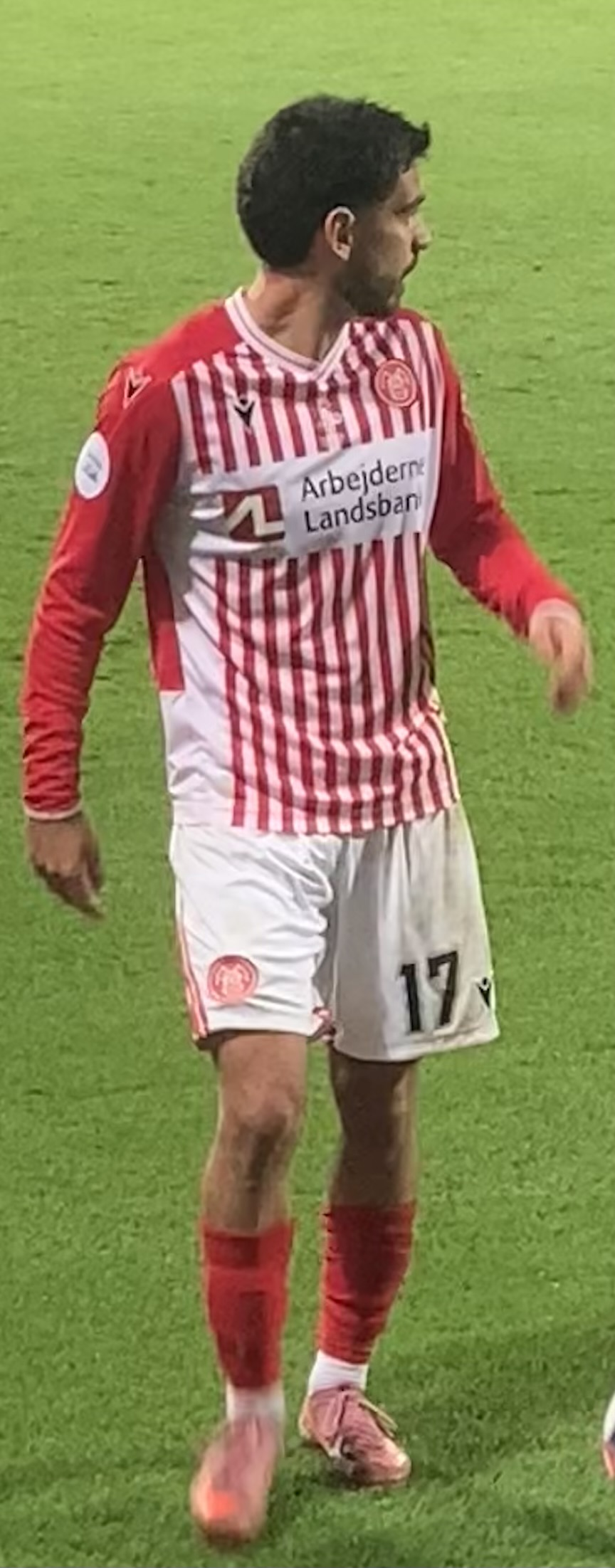
- Jasson with AaB in 2025

Personal information
- Full name: Andres Jasson
- Date of birth: January 17, 2002 (age 24)
- Place of birth: Greenwich, Connecticut, United States
- Height: 5 ft 9 in (1.75 m)
- Position: Winger

Team information
- Current team: AaB
- Number: 17

Youth career
- 2013–2016: FC Westchester
- 2016–2020: New York City FC

College career
Years	Team	Apps	(Gls)
2020	Yale Bulldogs	0	(0)

Senior career*
Years	Team	Apps	(Gls)
2020–2024	New York City FC	59	(3)
2022–2023	New York City FC II	8	(3)
2024–	AaB	52	(1)

International career^{‡}
2016–2017	United States U15		
2018–2019	United States U17	15	(1)
- * Club domestic league appearances and goals as of June 2, 2026 ‡ National team caps and goals as of December 31, 2020

Andres Jasson (born January 17, 2002) is an American professional soccer player who plays for Danish 1st Division club AaB.

== Club career ==
Jasson grew up in Greenwich, Connecticut and was raised by an Argentine father and Spanish mother. A four-star recruit, he signed a National Letter of Intent to play college soccer for Yale University. Jasson enrolled in Yale in August 2020, but due to the ongoing COVID-19 pandemic, the Ivy League soccer season was delayed to February 2021, before Jasson could play a competitive game for the Bulldogs.

On November 19, 2020, Jasson signed a homegrown player contract with New York City FC, forgoing his four years of collegiate eligibility. On December 15, 2020, he made his professional debut, coming on in the 70th minute of a CONCACAF Champions League match against UANL Tigres.

On June 7, 2024, Jasson signed with Danish Superliga side AaB.

== International career ==
Jasson has regularly appeared with the United States youth national team setup, joining the U-15 boys' team in 2016 and 2017, before joining the U.S. under-17 men's team at the October 2018 U17 International Youth Tournament in England.

== Career statistics ==
=== Club ===
As of August 3, 2023

Club Performance			League		Playoffs		National cup		Continental		Total	
Club	Season	League	Apps	Goals	Apps	Goals	Apps	Goals	Apps	Goals	Apps	Goals
New York City FC	2020	MLS	—		—		—		1 (Note: Appearance(s) in CONCACAF Champions League)	0	1	0
New York City FC	2021	MLS	20	0	1	0	—		—		21	0
New York City FC	2022	MLS	15	0	—		2	0	3	0	20	0
New York City FC	2023	MLS	13	1	—		1	0	2 (Note: Appearances in Leagues Cup)	1	16	2
New York City FC	Total		48	1	1	0	3	0	6	1	58	2
New York City FC II	2022	MLS Next Pro	7	2	—		—		—		7	2
Career totals			55	3	1	0	3	0	6	1	65	4

== Honors ==
New York City FC

- MLS Cup: 2021
- Campeones Cup: 2022
