= Pieter Lehrer =

Antigua and Barbudan canoeist and soccer coach (born 1965)

Personal information
- Date of birth: 29 January 1965 (age 61)
- Place of birth: Antigua and Barbuda

Team information
- Current team: Harvard Crimson (Head coach)

Youth career
- Years: Team
- 1984–1985: UCLA Bruins

Managerial career
- 2005–2012: California Golden Bears (assistant)
- 2013–2019: Harvard Crimson

Pieter Sand Lehrer (born 29 January 1965) is a sprint canoer from Antigua and Barbuda who competed in the mid-1990s. He was also a footballer. At the 1996 Summer Olympics, he advanced to the semifinals of the C-2 1000 m event, but did not compete. Lehrer was the head coach for the Harvard Crimson men's soccer program until 2019.
