= Dawson McCartney =

American soccer player (born 1998)

Personal information
- Date of birth: October 15, 1998 (age 28)
- Place of birth: Voorhees, New Jersey, United States
- Height: 6 ft 1 in (1.85 m)
- Position: Midfielder

Team information
- Current team: Birmingham Legion
- Number: 11

Youth career
- Highland Soccer
- 2011–2012: NJSA 04
- 2012–2013: FC DELCO
- 2013–2017: Philadelphia Union

College career
Years	Team	Apps	(Gls)
2017–2019	Dartmouth Big Green	43	(8)
2020–2021	Notre Dame Fighting Irish	30	(8)

Senior career*
Years	Team	Apps	(Gls)
2017	Bethlehem Steel	3	(0)
2018	Reading United	6	(0)
2019	GPS Portland Phoenix	0	(0)
2022–2023	Portland Timbers 2	38	(4)
2024–	Birmingham Legion	72	(5)
- * Club domestic league appearances and goals as of October 31, 2026

Dawson Edward McCartney (born October 15, 1998) is an American soccer player who currently plays as a midfielder for Birmingham Legion. Dawson played for the Dartmouth Big Green through the 2020 season.

== Early life ==
McCartney was born in Voorhees, NJ where he spent the majority of his childhood. His parents, Edward and Annemarie, played collegiate soccer and field hockey, respectively.

McCartney has three siblings, Edward, Troy and Cole. Edward played soccer for The College of New Jersey, graduated from the University of North Carolina School of Law and is an attorney at Milbank LLP. Troy played soccer at the University of Delaware, graduated from the University of Pennsylvania School of Dental Medicine and is a dentist in his orthodontic residency at the University of Nevada Las Vegas.

== Club career ==
McCartney joined Bethlehem Steel on an academy level contract for the 2017 USL season. He made his debut in a 1–0 home loss to Charleston Battery, and retained his place in the team for the following game against the Harrisburg City Islanders.

He committed to playing college soccer at Dartmouth College in 2017. In 2017, he was named Ivy League Rookie of the Year and Top Drawer Soccer Freshman Best XI First Team. In 2018 and 2019, he was named Second Team All-Ivy.

He was selected by the Portland Timbers in the second round of the 2021 MLS SuperDraft.

In December 2020, McCartney transferred to the University of Notre Dame.
