= MLS SuperDraft =

Annual player selection event of Major League Soccer

The MLS SuperDraft is an annual college draft for teams of Major League Soccer in the United States and Canada in which MLS clubs take turns selecting from a pool of eligible amateur players. These drafted players usually come from university teams competing in the National Collegiate Athletic Association (NCAA). It takes place in December or January and is used by teams to select players who have graduated from college or otherwise been signed by the league. The SuperDraft was first instituted in 2000, as a combination of the MLS College Draft, in which players having graduated from college were selected, and the MLS Supplemental Draft, in which all other players were chosen. The draft is divided into three rounds in which each club has a selection, the order of which is determined by a combination of the teams' playoff and regular season positions, with the last placed team (or expansion teams) getting the first pick.

== History ==
From 1996 to 1999, all American players graduating college were entered into the MLS College Draft, and were eligible to be selected by all Major League Soccer teams. Players who had already graduated from college were entered into a separate MLS Supplemental Draft. The division between the two was eliminated in 2000, when they were combined into a single MLS SuperDraft. Originally created to ensure strict parity in the league, the draft was designed to allow weaker clubs to develop their rosters. The first SuperDraft was held in 2000, and since then has become the primary draft of the league. Recently, the draft has been considered to be secondary to youth academies.

The importance of the SuperDraft waned in the 2010s as MLS teams established their own youth academy systems and acquired young players from other leagues. The 2020 MLS SuperDraft was conducted exclusively by conference calls and online streaming for the first time.

== Eligible players ==
Only players from the American college sports system (e.g., the NCAA and the NAIA) are eligible to be drafted. Canadian U Sports men's soccer players are not included, despite numerous proposals and discussions in 2010 and 2012 when U Sports was Canadian Interuniversity Sport (CIS). In previous SuperDrafts, a few players were drafted directly from clubs outside the U.S. or Canada. While the NFL and NBA rely heavily on the annual event for an infusion of workers, MLS is now 10 years into allowing teams to groom talent in their youth academies and maintain exclusive rights to those players, even if they do end up playing NCAA soccer. They are called homegrown players.

== Rules of draft selection ==
The draft process for the SuperDraft closely resembles the NFL draft. Below is the process for the 2023 MLS SuperDraft:

1. Any expansion club automatically gets the first pick; should there be two expansion teams, a coin toss determines who picks first in the SuperDraft and who picks first in the expansion draft.
2. Teams that did not make the playoffs are ordered by their regular-season record.
3. Teams that made the MLS Cup playoffs are then ordered by which round of the playoffs they are eliminated.
4. The winners of the MLS Cup are given the last selection, and the losers the penultimate selection.
5. Remaining ties are broken by the goal differential, goals scored, goals conceded, and then the flip of a coin.

Status	Draft picks
Expansion clubs	1
Non-playoff clubs	2–17
Eliminated in knockout round	18–21
Eliminated in conference semifinals	22–25
Eliminated in conference championships	26–27
MLS Cup finalist	28
MLS Cup winner	29

== List of MLS College Drafts ==
Year	Date	Rounds	Picks	City	First selection	Team
1996	March 4, 1996	3	30	Fort Lauderdale, FL	(United States) Matt McKeon	Kansas City Wiz
1997	February 1, 1997	3	30	Fort Lauderdale, FL	(United States) Tahj Jakins	Colorado Rapids
1998	January 31, 1998	3	36	Fort Lauderdale, FL	(United States) Leo Cullen	Miami Fusion
1999	February 6, 1999	3	36	Fort Lauderdale, FL	(United States) Jason Moore	D.C. United

== List of MLS SuperDrafts ==
Year	Date	Rounds	Picks	City	First selection	Team
2000	February 6, 2000	6	72	Fort Lauderdale, FL	(United States) Steve Shak	MetroStars
2001	February 5, 2001	6	72	Davie, FL	(United States) Chris Carrieri	San Jose Earthquakes
2002	February 10, 2002	6	70	Lake Buena Vista, FL	(Liberia) Chris Gbandi	Dallas Burn
2003	January 17, 2003	6	60	Kansas City, MO	(United States) Alecko Eskandarian	D.C. United
2004	January 16, 2004	6	60	Charlotte, NC	(United States) Freddy Adu	D.C. United
2005	January 14, 2005	4	48	Baltimore, MD	(United States) Nikolas Besagno	Real Salt Lake
2006	January 20, 2006	4	48	Philadelphia, PA	(United States) Marvell Wynne	MetroStars
2007	January 12, 2007	4	52	Indianapolis, IN	(United States) Maurice Edu	Toronto FC
2008	January 18, 2008	4	56	Baltimore, MD	(United States) Chance Myers	Kansas City Wizards
2009	January 15, 2009	4	60	St. Louis, MO	(Democratic Republic of the Congo) Steve Zakuani	Seattle Sounders FC
2010	January 14, 2010	4	64	Philadelphia, PA	(United States) Danny Mwanga	Philadelphia Union
2011	January 13, 2011	3	54	Baltimore, MD	(United States) Omar Salgado	Vancouver Whitecaps FC
2012	January 12, 2012	2	38	Kansas City, MO	(United States) Andrew Wenger	Montreal Impact
2013	January 17, 2013	2	38	Indianapolis, IN	(United States) Andrew Farrell	New England Revolution
2014	January 16, 2014	4	77	Philadelphia, PA	(Jamaica) Andre Blake	Philadelphia Union
2015	January 15, 2015	4	84	Philadelphia, PA	(Canada) Cyle Larin	Orlando City SC
2016	January 14, 2016	4	75	Baltimore, MD	(England) Jack Harrison	Chicago Fire
2017	January 13, 2017	4	81	Los Angeles, CA	(Ghana) Abu Danladi	Minnesota United FC
2018	January 19, 2018	4	81	Philadelphia, PA	(Portugal) João Moutinho	Los Angeles FC
2019	January 11, 2019	4	75	Chicago, IL	(United States) Frankie Amaya	FC Cincinnati
2020	January 9, 2020	4	77	via teleconference	(United States) Robbie Robinson	Inter Miami CF
2021	January 21, 2021	3	75	via teleconference	(Venezuela) Dani Pereira	Austin FC
2022	January 11, 2022	3	79	via teleconference	(United States) Ben Bender	Charlotte FC
2023	December 21, 2022 (Note: Beginning this year, drafts were held in December but continued to be branded with the upcoming year)	3	83	via teleconference	(Senegal) Hamady Diop	Charlotte FC
2024	December 19, 2023	3	87	via teleconference	(Trinidad and Tobago) Tyrese Spicer	Toronto FC
2025	December 20, 2024	3	90	via teleconference	(Ghana) Manu Duah	San Diego FC
2026	December 18, 2025	3	90	via teleconference	(Canada) Nikola Markovic	D.C. United
