= 2022 New York City FC season =

New York City FC
2022 season
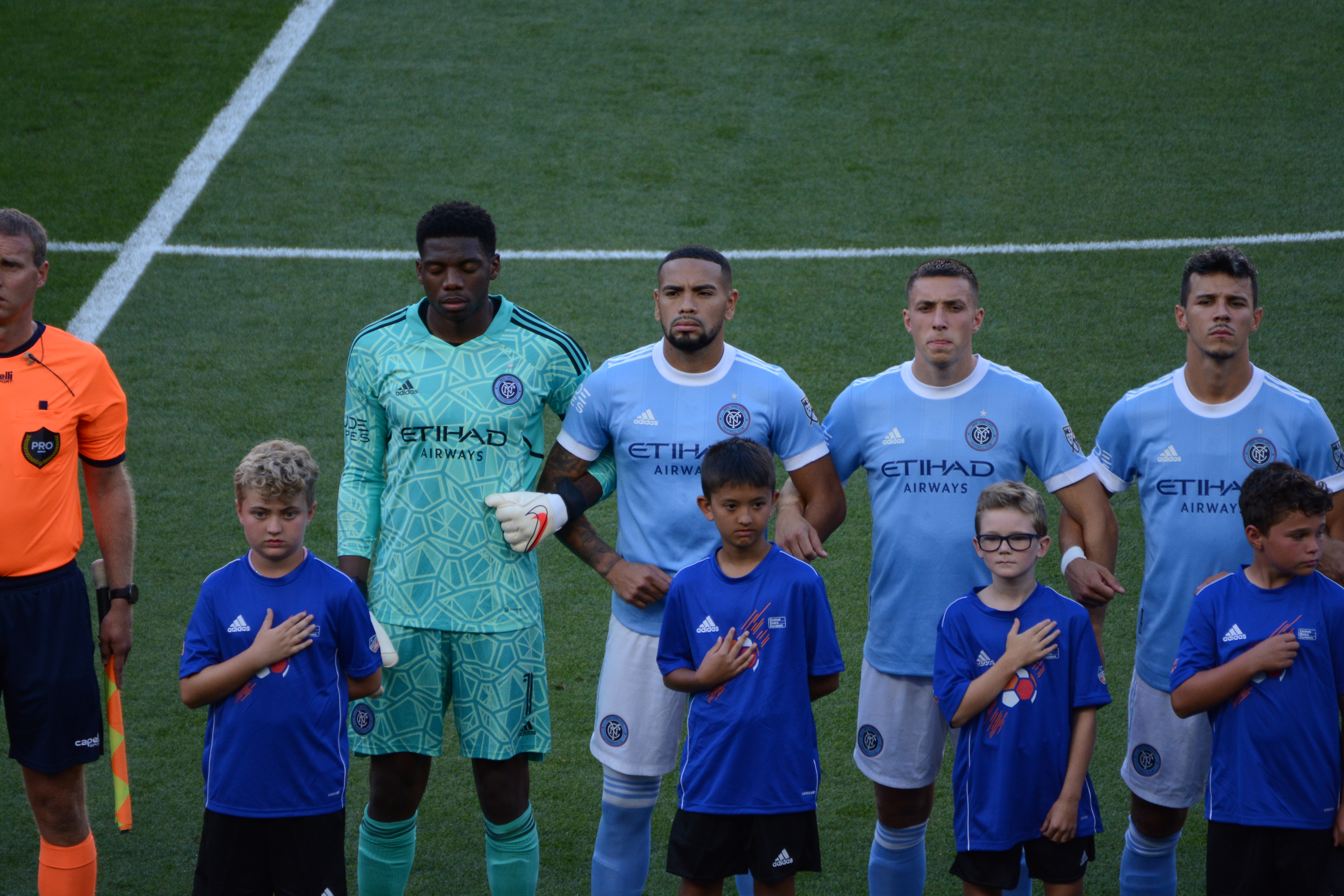
- New York City FC players lining up before a match against FC Cincinnati in June 2022
- Head coach: Nick Cushing (interim)
- Stadium: Yankee Stadium (The Bronx, New York); Citi Field (Queens, New York) (4 matches); Red Bull Arena (Harrison, New Jersey) (3 matches); Belson Stadium (Queens, New York) (At least 2 matches); Banc of California Stadium (Los Angeles, California) (1 match); Pratt & Whitney Stadium at Rentschler Field (East Hartford, Connecticut) (1 match)
- MLS: Conference: 3rd Overall: 5th
- MLS Cup Playoffs: Conference Finals
- U.S. Open Cup: Quarter-finals
- CONCACAF Champions League: Semi-finals
- Campeones Cup: Champions
- Top goalscorer: League: Valentín Castellanos (13); All: Valentín Castellanos (17)
- Highest home attendance: 23,277 vs. Inter Miami CF
- Biggest win: League/All: NYCFC 6–0 RSL (4/17)
- Biggest defeat: League: NYCFC 0–2 PHI (3/19); All: RBNY 3–0 NYCFC (6/22, USOC QF)
Home colors	Away colors

The 2022 New York City FC season was the club's eighth season in Major League Soccer, the top division of soccer in the United States. The club entered the season as the defending MLS Cup champions, having won the 2021 title. NYCFC also participated in the 2022 CONCACAF Champions League and were eliminated in the semifinals by Seattle Sounders FC.

== Player movement ==
=== In ===
No.	Pos.	Player	Transferred from	Fee/notes	Date	Source
5	DF	(Brazil) Thiago Martins	(Japan) Yokohama F. Marinos	Transfer	February 7, 2022	
22	FW	(Republic of Ireland) Kevin O'Toole	(United States) Princeton	2022 MLS SuperDraft pick	March 7, 2022	
38	AM	(Brazil) Gabriel Pereira dos Santos	(Brazil) Corinthians	Transfer	March 17, 2022	
17	CM	(Argentina) Matías Pellegrini	(United States) Inter Miami CF	Transfer	August 19, 2022	

=== Out ===
No.	Pos.	Player	Transferred to	Fee/notes	Date	Source
14	DM	(United States) Juan Pablo Torres	(United States) Rio Grande Valley FC	Option Declined	December 13, 2021	
15	CM	(Belize) Tony Rocha	(United States) Orange County SC	Option Declined	December 13, 2021	
16	DM	(United States) James Sands	(Scotland) Rangers F.C.	Loan	January 5, 2022	
19	RW / AM	(Paraguay) Jesús Medina	(Russia) CSKA Moscow	Option Declined	December 13, 2021	
20	LB	(Iceland) Guðmundur Þórarinsson	(Denmark) AaB Fodbold	Option Declined	December 13, 2021	
17	RW	(Libya) Ismael Tajouri-Shradi	(United States) Los Angeles FC	2021 MLS Expansion Draft pick/Transfer	December 14, 2021	
11	CF	(Argentina) Valentín Castellanos	(Spain) Girona FC	Loan	July 25, 2022	

1. Originally, Tajouri-Shradi was selected as part of the Expansion Draft to play with the newly formed Charlotte FC, however, he was immediately traded to Los Angeles FC in exchange for $400,000 in General Allocation money.

== Roster ==
Current as of November 2, 2022.

Squad No.	Name	Nationality	Position(s)	Since	Date of birth (age)	Signed from	Games played	Goals
Goalkeepers
1	Sean Johnson	(United States)	GK	2017	May 31, 1989 (age 36)	Chicago Fire FC	206	0
13	Luis Barraza	(United States)	GK	2019	November 8, 1996 (age 29)	Chicago FC United	9	0
25	Cody Mizell	(United States)	GK	2021	September 30, 1991 (age 34)	New Mexico United	0	0
Defenders
3	Anton Tinnerholm	(Sweden)	RB	2018	February 26, 1991 (age 35)	Malmö	130	9
4	Maxime Chanot	(Luxembourg)	CB	2016	November 21, 1989 (age 36)	Kortrijk	176	8
6	Alexander Callens	(Peru)	CB	2017	May 4, 1992 (age 33)	Numancia	193	15
5	Thiago Martins Bueno	(Brazil)	CB	2022	March 17, 1995 (age 31)	Yokohama F. Marinos	36	0
2	Chris Gloster	(United States)	LB	2020	July 28, 2000 (age 25)	Jong PSV	20	0
24	Tayvon Gray	(United States)	CB	2017	August 19, 2002 (age 23)	New York City Academy	49	0
32	Vuk Latinovich	(Serbia)	CB	2021	September 14, 1997 (age 28)	Chicago Football United	12	0
12	Malte Amundsen	(Denmark)	CB	2018	February 11, 1998 (age 28)	Vejle	71	1
Midfielders
10	Maximiliano Moralez	(Argentina)	AM	2017	February 27, 1987 (age 39)	León	194	35
43	Talles Magno Bacelar Martins	(Brazil)	AM	2021	June 26, 2002 (age 23)	Vasco da Gama	63	14
42	Santiago Rodríguez	(Uruguay)	AM	2021	January 8, 2000 (age 26)	Montevideo City Torque	79	11
38	Gabriel Pereira dos Santos	(Brazil)	AM	2022	August 1, 2001 (age 24)	Corinthians	31	9
23	Gedion Zelalem	(United States)	CM	2020	January 26, 1997 (age 29)	Sporting Kansas City	24	0
7	Alfredo Morales	(United States)	DM	2021	May 12, 1990 (age 35)	Fortuna Düsseldorf	63	1
26	Nicolás Acevedo	(Uruguay)	DM	2020	April 14, 1999 (age 26)	Liverpool Montevideo	82	0
55	Keaton Parks	(United States)	CM	2019	August 6, 1997 (age 28)	Benfica	116	12
80	Justin Haak	(United States)	CM	2019	September 12, 2001 (age 24)	New York Soccer Club	24	0
17	Matías Pellegrini	(Argentina)	CM	2022	March 11, 2000 (age 26)	Inter Miami CF	6	0
Forwards
9	Héber	(Brazil)	CF	2019	August 10, 1991 (age 34)	Rijeka	95	27
8	Thiago Andrade	(Brazil)	LW	2021	October 31, 2000 (age 25)	Esporte Clube Bahia	66	11
11	Valentín Castellanos	(Argentina)	CF	2018	October 3, 1998 (age 27)	Montevideo City Torque	134	59
21	Andres Jasson	(United States)	LW	2020	January 17, 2002 (age 24)	New York Soccer Club	42	0
22	Kevin O'Toole	(Republic of Ireland)	CF	2022	December 14, 1998 (age 27)	Princeton Tigers men's soccer	12	0

== Non-competitive ==
Win Draw Loss

=== Preseason ===
January 23 Friendly	New York City FC	3–1	New York Red Bulls	Kissimmee, Florida
	Héber 22', 37'; Owusu 73'	Report	Ryan 60'	Stadium: Osceola Heritage Park; Attendance: 0

January 29 Friendly	New York City FC	2–2	CF Montréal	Orlando, Florida
12:00 EST	Andrade 30'; Jasson 56'	Report	Torres 67'; Ibrahim 88'	Stadium: Orlando City Training Grounds; Attendance: 0

February 5 Friendly	Cancún	1–7	New York City FC	Cancún, Mexico
	47'	Report	Héber 22'; Rodríguez 28', 40'; Talles Magno 41'; Castellanos 57', 69', 71'

February 9 Friendly	Querétaro	1–4	New York City FC	Cancún, Mexico
	Goal	Report	Rodríguez; Castellanos; Talles Magno

February 9 Friendly	Inter Playa del Carmen	1–2	New York City FC	Cancún, Mexico
	Goal	Report	Andrade pen.' pen.'	Attendance: 0

== Competitive ==
=== Major League Soccer ===
==== Standings ====
===== Eastern Conference =====
Pos	Team	Pld	W	L	T	GF	GA	GD	Pts	Qualification
1	Philadelphia Union	34	19	5	10	72	26	+46	67	Qualification for the Conference semifinals & 2023 CONCACAF Champions League
2	CF Montréal (Note: Canadian clubs cannot qualify for the 2023 CONCACAF Champions League through the MLS regular season or playoffs.)	34	20	9	5	63	50	+13	65	Qualification for the first round
3	New York City FC	34	16	11	7	57	41	+16	55	Qualification for the first round
4	New York Red Bulls	34	15	11	8	50	41	+9	53	Qualification for the first round
5	FC Cincinnati	34	12	9	13	64	56	+8	49	Qualification for the first round

Source: MLS
Rules for classification: 1) points; 2) total wins; 3) total goal differential; 4) total goals scored; 5) fewer disciplinary points; 6) away goal differential; 7) away goals scored; 8) home goals differential; 9) home goals scored; 10) coin toss (2 clubs tied) or drawing of lots (≥3 clubs tied)

===== Overall table =====
Pos	Team	Pld	W	L	T	GF	GA	GD	Pts	Qualification
3	CF Montréal (Note: Canadian clubs cannot qualify for the 2023 CONCACAF Champions League through the MLS regular season or playoffs.)	34	20	9	5	63	50	+13	65	
4	Austin FC	34	16	10	8	65	49	+16	56	Qualification for the 2023 CONCACAF Champions League (Note: As highest-ranked U.S. based Division I club (based on 2022 MLS regular season record) not already qualified (USA3))
5	New York City FC	34	16	11	7	57	41	+16	55	
6	New York Red Bulls	34	15	11	8	50	41	+9	53	
7	FC Dallas	34	14	9	11	48	37	+11	53	

Source: MLS
Rules for classification: 1) points; 2) total wins; 3) total goal differential; 4) total goals scored; 5) fewer disciplinary points; 6) away goal differential; 7) away goals scored; 8) home goals differential; 9) home goals scored; 10) coin toss (2 clubs tied) or drawing of lots (≥3 clubs tied)

==== Matches ====
February 27 1	LA Galaxy	1–0	New York City FC	Carson, California
5:00 p.m. EST	Douglas Costa (yellow card) 41'; Hernández 90'	Report	Acevedo (yellow card) 15'; Amundsen (yellow card) 54'; Callens (yellow card) 90+5'	Stadium: Dignity Health Sports Park; Attendance: 25,174; Referee: Joseph Dickerson

March 5 2	Vancouver Whitecaps FC	0–0	New York City FC	Vancouver, British Columbia
6:00 p.m. EST	Cavallini (yellow card) 39'; Jungwirth (yellow card) 62'	Report	Castellanos (yellow card) 62'; Rodríguez (yellow card) 90'	Stadium: BC Place; Attendance: 18,643; Referee: Marcos de Oliveira

March 12 3	New York City FC	4–1	CF Montréal	New York, New York
1:00 p.m. EST	Callens 7'; Rodríguez 20'; Morales (yellow card) 22'; Talles Magno 64'; Thiago Andrade 83'	Report	Miljevic (yellow card) 36'; Brault-Guillard 52'	Stadium: Yankee Stadium; Attendance: 21,113; Referee: Armando Villarreal

March 19 4	New York City FC	0–2	Philadelphia Union	New York, New York
1:00 p.m. EDT	Jasson (yellow card) 11'; Rodríguez (yellow card) 50'; Castellanos (yellow card) 72'; Talles Magno (yellow card) 85'	Report	Bedoya 12'; Carranza (yellow card) 14'; Gazdag 33', (yellow card) 67'; Wagner (yellow card) 72'; Burke (yellow card) 73'	Stadium: Yankee Stadium; Attendance: 15,968; Referee: Ted Unkel

April 2 5	Toronto FC	2–1	New York City FC	Toronto, Ontario
4:00 p.m. EDT	Jiménez 31'; Martins 43' (o.g.)	Report	Martins (yellow card) 59'; Callens (yellow card) 59'; Héber 90+2'	Stadium: BMO Field; Attendance: 21,802; Referee: Drew Fischer

April 17 6	New York City FC	6–0	Real Salt Lake	New York, New York
1:00 p.m. EDT	Castellanos 9', 40' (pen.), 57' (pen.), 80', (yellow card) 34'; Thiago Andrade 15', 55'; Gray (yellow card) 31'	Report	Schmitt (yellow card) 38'; Herrera (yellow card) 42'; Caldwell (yellow card) 63'	Stadium: Yankee Stadium; Attendance: 14,513; Referee: Ismail Elfath

April 24 7	New York City FC	5–4	Toronto FC	New York, New York
5:00 p.m. EDT	Castellanos 38'; Acevedo (yellow card) 40'; Thiago Andrade 49'; Rodríguez 54'; Parks 58'; Pereira 75'; Morales (yellow card) 83' (yellow-red card) 89'	Report	Jiménez 13', 27', (yellow card) 44'; Kerr 86'; Bradley 90'	Stadium: Citi Field; Attendance: 17,626; Referee: Rubiel Vazquez

May 1 8	New York City FC	3–0	San Jose Earthquakes	New York, New York
1:00 p.m. EDT	Parks 74'; Callens (yellow card) 77'; Pereira 78'; Castellanos (yellow card) 80'; Rodríguez (yellow card) 82'; Gloster 88'	Report		Stadium: Yankee Stadium; Attendance: 17,174; Referee: Guido Gonzales, Jr.

May 7 9	New York City FC	0–0	Sporting Kansas City	New York, New York
7:00 p.m. EDT	Acevedo (yellow card) 64'	Report	Ndenbe (yellow card) 45'; Ford (yellow card) 89'	Stadium: Citi Field; Attendance: 15,031; Referee: Timothy Ford

May 14 10	New York City FC	2–0	Columbus Crew	New York, New York
7:00 p.m. EDT	Talles Magno 9'; Moralez (yellow card) 18'; Castellanos 57'; Parks (yellow card) 84'; Martins (yellow card) 90'	Report	Mensah (yellow card) 86'	Stadium: Yankee Stadium; Attendance: 18,813; Referee: Marcos De Oliviera

May 18 11	D.C. United	0–2	New York City FC	Washington, D.C.
7:30 p.m. EDT	Romo (yellow card) 19'	Report	Callens 6'; Rodríguez (yellow card) 36'; Castellanos 45+5' (pen.), (yellow card) 63'; Zelalem (yellow card) 90+4'	Stadium: Audi Field; Attendance: 16,072; Referee: Chris Penso

May 22 12	New York City FC	1–0	Chicago Fire FC	New York, New York
5:00 p.m. EDT	Héber 23' (pen.); Acevedo (yellow card) 46'; Martins (yellow card) 89'; Parks (yellow card) 90+4'	Report	Sekulic (yellow card) 63'	Stadium: Citi Field; Attendance: 18,823; Referee: Fotis Bazakos

May 28 13	Minnesota United FC	0–1	New York City FC	Saint Paul, Minnesota
8:00 p.m. EDT	Dibassy (yellow card) 31'; Trapp (yellow card) 36'; Taylor (yellow card) 39'; Rosales (yellow card) 44'	Report	Callens 29'; Thiago Andrade (yellow card) 82'	Stadium: Allianz Field; Attendance: 19,695; Referee: Michael Radchuk

June 19 14	New York City FC	1–1	Colorado Rapids	New York, New York
5:00 p.m. EDT	Castellanos (yellow card) 68'; Talles Magno 72'; Morales (yellow card) 83'	Report	Price (yellow card) 30'; Abubakar (yellow card) 56'; Barrios 68'; Acosta (yellow card) 73'; Wilson (yellow card) 76'	Stadium: Yankee Stadium; Attendance: 19,812; Referee: Marcos de Oliveira

June 26 15	Philadelphia Union	2–1	New York City FC	Chester, Pennsylvania
6:00 p.m. EDT	Uhre 9'; Carranza (yellow card) 81'; Burke 90+6'	Report	Rodríguez (yellow card) 13'; Callens (yellow card) 79'; Castellanos (yellow card) 80', (goal) 89' (pen.); Moralez (yellow card) 87'	Stadium: Subaru Park; Attendance: 18,589; Referee: Armando Villarreal

June 29 16	FC Cincinnati	4–4	New York City FC	Cincinnati, Ohio
7:30 p.m. EDT	Acosta 15'; Brenner 24', 30', 70', (yellow card) 90'; Nwobodo (yellow card) 57'; Cruz (yellow card) 62'	Report	Haak (yellow card) 31'; Callens (yellow card) 31'; Talles Magno 45'; Héber 45+2', 45+7'; Pereira 52'	Stadium: TQL Stadium; Attendance: 21,258; Referee: Ismir Pekmic

July 3 17	New York City FC	2–2	Atlanta United FC	New York, New York
5:00 p.m. EDT	Chanot (yellow card) 18'; Rodríguez (yellow card) 24'; Castellanos 37', 58'; Talles Magno (yellow card) 52'; Morales (yellow card) 71'	Report	McFadden (yellow card) 16'; Araújo (yellow card) 47'; Martínez 56'; Dwyer 86'	Stadium: Yankee Stadium; Attendance: 17,704; Referee: Rosendo Mendoza

July 9 18	New York City FC	4–2	New England Revolution	New York, New York
1:00 p.m. EDT	Talles Magno 10' (pen.); Castellanos (penalty missed) 34', (yellow card) 36', (goal) 44' (pen.), 82'; Pereira 49'; Haak (yellow card) 70'	Report	Bou 18', 77'; Farrell (red card) 41'; Gil (yellow card) 84'	Stadium: Yankee Stadium; Attendance: 17,991; Referee: Timothy Ford

July 13 19	FC Dallas	0–1	New York City FC	Frisco, Texas
9:00 p.m. EDT	Ntsabeleng (yellow card) 50'; Jara (yellow card) 90+6'	Report	Chanot (yellow card) 8'; Héber 29'; Johnson (yellow card) 90+4'	Stadium: Toyota Stadium; Attendance: 13,656; Referee: Victor Rivas

July 17 20	New York Red Bulls	0–1	New York City FC	Harrison, New Jersey
5:00 p.m. EDT	Cásseres Jr. (yellow card) 84'; Amaya (yellow card) 86'; Nealis (yellow card) 90+4'	Report	Morales (yellow card) 41'; Castellanos 69', (yellow card) 88'; Acevedo (yellow card) 71'	Stadium: Red Bull Arena; Attendance: 25,219; Referee: Chris Penso

July 23 21	New York City FC	2–0	Inter Miami CF	New York, New York
7:00 p.m. EDT	Moralez 12'; Morales (yellow card) 14'; Héber 75'	Report		Stadium: Yankee Stadium; Attendance: 23,277; Referee: Allen Chapman

July 30 22	CF Montréal	0–0	New York City FC	Montreal, Quebec
7:30 p.m. EDT	Johnston (yellow card) 35'; Mihailovic (yellow card) 53'	Report		Stadium: Saputo Stadium; Attendance: 19,619; Referee: Ramy Touchan

August 6 23	Columbus Crew	3–2	New York City FC	Columbus, Ohio
7:30 p.m. EDT	Mensah (yellow card) 5'; Hernández 20'; Zelarayán 27', 75'; Etienne (yellow card) 63'	Report	Mensah 3' (o.g.); Rodríguez (yellow card) 18'; Morales (yellow card) 47'; Pereira 64'; Tinnerholm (yellow card) 74'; Amundsen (yellow card) 82'	Stadium: Lower.com Field; Attendance: 18,609; Referee: Rubiel Vazquez

August 13 24	Inter Miami CF	3–2	New York City FC	Fort Lauderdale, FL
8:00 p.m. EDT	Pozuelo 39', 84', (yellow card) 84'; Gregore (yellow card) 32'; Taylor (yellow card) 48'; Lassiter 63'	Report	Magno 34'; Morales (yellow card) 41'; Thiago Andrade 45+2'; Amundsen (yellow card) 55'; Chanot (yellow card) 77'; Rodríguez (yellow card) 86'	Stadium: DRV PNK Stadium; Attendance: 11,419; Referee: Drew Fischer

August 17 25	New York City FC	1–3	Charlotte FC	Harrison, New Jersey
8:00 p.m. EDT	Chanot 28'	Report	Świderski 4', (yellow card) 16'; McNeill (yellow card) 57'; Bronico 77'; Fuchs 90+1' (pen.)	Stadium: Red Bull Arena; Attendance: 8,531; Referee: Jon Freemon

August 21 26	Chicago Fire FC	0–2	New York City FC	Bridgeview, Illinois
6:30 p.m. EDT	Czichos (yellow card) 18'; Terán (yellow card) 60'; M. Navarro (yellow card) 77'	Report	Pereira 16'; Rodríguez 46', (yellow card) 72'	Stadium: SeatGeek Stadium; Attendance: 11,720; Referee: Rosendo Mendoza

August 28 27	Orlando City SC	2–1	New York City FC	Orlando, Florida
7:30 p.m. EDT	Urso 7'; Carlos (yellow card) 50'; Akindele 90+6'	Report	Haak (yellow card) 45+1'; Moralez 53', (yellow card) 89'; Chanot (yellow card) 90+3'	Stadium: Exploria Stadium; Attendance: 16,289; Referee: Chris Penso

August 31 28	New York City FC	1–2	D.C. United	Harrison, New Jersey
8:00 p.m. EDT	Héber 27'; Acevedo (yellow card) 56'; Amundsen (yellow card) 62'; Latinovich (yellow card) 69'	Report	Odoi-Atsem (yellow card) 22'; Kamara 24'; Rodríguez (yellow card) 25'; Birnbaum 57'; Fletcher (yellow card) 90+3'	Stadium: Red Bull Arena; Attendance: 8,113; Referee: Ismir Pekmic
Note: The match was originally scheduled for April 9 with the originally venue at Citi Field which was rescheduled to August 29 in order to allow NYCFC to prepare for the CONCACAF Champions League semifinals. The venue was also switched over to Red Bull Arena as it was the only venue available at the time.

September 4 29	New England Revolution	3–0	New York City FC	Foxborough, Massachusetts
8:00 p.m. EDT	Bell 12'; Buck 33', (yellow card) 41'; McNamara 66'	Report		Stadium: Gillette Stadium; Attendance: 17,793; Referee: Guido Gonzales Jr.

September 7 30	New York City FC	1–1	FC Cincinnati	New York, New York
8:00 p.m. EDT	Pereira 41', (yellow card) 43'; Martins (red card) 75'; Acevedo (yellow card) 83'; Chanot (yellow card) 90+3'	Report	Martins 22' (o.g.); Nwobodo (yellow card) 63'	Stadium: Citi Field; Attendance: 14,248; Referee: Ted Unkel

September 10 31	Charlotte FC	1–0	New York City FC	Charlotte, North Carolina
1:00 p.m. EDT	Ríos 5'; Fuchs (red card) 56'; Walkes (yellow card) 90+4'; Bronico (yellow card) 90+6'; Shinyashiki (yellow card) 90+9'	Report	Jasson (yellow card) 47'; Rodríguez (yellow card) 74'; Callens (yellow card) 90+4'	Stadium: Bank of America Stadium; Attendance: 30,159; Referee: Victor Rivas

September 17 32	New York City FC	2–0	New York Red Bulls	New York, New York
1:00 p.m. EDT	Callens 1'; Rodríguez 23' (yellow card) 89'; Acevedo (yellow card) 46'; Moralez (yellow card) 63'	Report	Morgan (yellow card) 25'; Duncan (yellow card) 28'; Cásseres Jr. (yellow card) 86'; Edelman (yellow card) 89'	Stadium: Yankee Stadium; Attendance: 30,151; Referee: Allen Chapman

October 2 33	New York City FC	2–1	Orlando City SC	Harrison, New Jersey
1:00 p.m. EDT	Callens 66'; Moralez (yellow card) 69'; Magno 81', (yellow card) 82'	Report	Torres 47'; Araújo (yellow card) 57'; Urso (yellow card) 89'	Stadium: Red Bull Arena; Attendance: 13,169; Referee: Joseph Dickerson
Note: The match was originally scheduled to play on October 1, 2022, at Citi Field with the venue subject to change depending on New York Mets post-season contention. However, the MLB lockout affected the availability on both Citi Field and Yankee Stadium, causing the match to move to Red Bull Arena instead. It also moved the match date to October 2 as Red Bull Arena was unavailable on October 1.

October 9 34	Atlanta United FC	1–2	New York City FC	Atlanta, Georgia
2:30 p.m. EDT	Araújo (yellow card) 45+6'; Almada (yellow card) 64'; Gutman 67'; Purata (yellow card) 81'	Report	Pereira 9'; Callens (yellow card) 10'; Héber 60'; Rodríguez (yellow card) 72'; Johnson (yellow card) 83'; Tinnerholm (yellow card) 85'	Stadium: Mercedes-Benz Stadium; Attendance: 43,312; Referee: Chris Penso

=== MLS Cup Playoffs ===
October 17 First round	New York City FC	3–0	Inter Miami CF	New York, New York
7:00 PM EDT	Pereira 63'; Moralez 69'; Acevedo (yellow card) 77'; Héber 90 +2'	Report	Lassiter (yellow card) 58'; Lowe (yellow card) 66'; Pozuelo (yellow card) 90'	Stadium: Citi Field; Attendance: 18,066; Referee: Rubiel Vazquez

October 23 Eastern Conference Semifinals	CF Montréal	1–3	New York City FC	Montreal, Quebec
1:00 PM EDT	Camacho (yellow card) 53'; Waterman (yellow card) 67'; Mihailovic (yellow card) 69' (goal) 85'	Report	Moralez 6'; O'Toole (yellow card) 33'; Rodríguez (yellow card) 38'; Callens (yellow card) 42'; Héber 45 +3'; Magno 61' (pen.)	Stadium: Stade Saputo; Attendance: 19,619; Referee: Drew Fischer

October 30 Eastern Conference Finals	Philadelphia Union	3–1	New York City FC	Chester, Pennsylvania
8:00 PM EDT	Martinez (yellow card) 39'; Carranza 65'; Gazdag 67'; Burke 76'; Glesnes (yellow card) 90+3'	Report	Moralez 57'	Stadium: Subaru Park; Attendance: 19,770; Referee: Allen Chapman

=== U.S. Open Cup ===
May 11 Round of 32	New York City FC (MLS) (New York (state))	3–1	(New York (state)) Rochester New York FC (MLSNP)	New York, New York
7:00 pm EDT	Morales (yellow card) 21'; Thiago Andrade 23'; Héber 31', (yellow card) 62'; Zelalem (yellow card) 55'; Pereira (yellow card) 68' (yellow-red card) 90+1'; Chanot 76'	Report	Wood (yellow card) 33'; Baitz 45+3'; Akanyirige (yellow card) 55'; Rayo (yellow card) 58'; Djaló (yellow card) 84'; Lopez (yellow card) 90+2'; Popp (red card) 90+6'	Stadium: Belson Stadium; Attendance: 1,002; Referee: Ernie Constantine

May 25 Round of 16	New York City FC (MLS) (New York (state))	1–0 (a.e.t.)	(Massachusetts) New England Revolution (MLS)	New York, New York
7:30 pm EDT	Thiago Andrade (yellow card) 8'; Haak (yellow card) 60'; Zelalem (yellow card) 84'; Rodríguez 94', (yellow card) 100'; Castellanos (yellow card) 120+1'	Report	Spaulding (yellow card) 55'; Polster (yellow card) 62'	Stadium: Belson Stadium; Attendance: 1,200; Referee: Luis Arroyo

June 22 QF	New York Red Bulls (MLS) (New Jersey)	3–0	(New York (state)) New York City FC (MLS)	Harrison, New Jersey
7:00 pm EDT	Long (yellow card) 35'; Morgan 52'; Cásseres Jr. (yellow card) 56'; Luquinhas 70'; Nealis (yellow card) 77'; Fernandez 90+1'; Harper (yellow card) 90+3'; Edwards (red card) 90+6'	Report	Parks (yellow card) 15'; Rodríguez (yellow card) 18'; Amundsen (yellow card) 20'; Thiago Andrade (red card) 62'; Moralez (red card) 90+6'	Stadium: Red Bull Arena; Attendance: 12,575; Referee: Matthew Thompson

=== CONCACAF Champions League ===
==== Round of 16 ====
February 15 First leg	Santos de Guápiles (Costa Rica)	0–2	(United States) New York City FC	San José, Costa Rica
8:00 PM EST	Arboine (yellow card) 36'; Barquero (yellow card) 61'	Report	Castellanos 5' (pen.), 30'; Rodríguez (red card) 69'	Stadium: Estadio Nacional de Costa Rica; Attendance: 3,435; Referee: José Torres (Puerto Rico)

February 23 Second leg	New York City FC (United States)	4–0 (6–0 agg.)	(Costa Rica) Santos de Guápiles	Los Angeles, California
6:00 PM EST	Morales 32'; Chanot 36'; Talles Magno 80', 86'; Castellanos (yellow card) 90+1'	Report	Bennett (red card) 83'	Stadium: Banc of California Stadium; Attendance: 100; Referee: Fernando Guerrero (Mexico)
Note: NYCFC's home ground, Yankee Stadium, and second-choice venue, Citi Field, were not CONCACAF-approved, and the club's third-choice venue, Red Bull Arena, was unavailable due to stadium and pitch renovations, the club chose to host the match at Banc of California Stadium, chosen because of its proximity to LA Galaxy's stadium, where NYCFC would play four days later in MLS regular season.

==== Quarter-finals ====
March 8, 2022 First leg	New York City FC (United States)	3–1	(Guatemala) Communicaciones	East Hartford, Connecticut
8:00 PM EST	Castellanos 29'; Moralez 65'; Amundsen (yellow card) 68'; Rodríguez 71'	Report	Aparicio (yellow card) 43'; Gamboa 60'	Stadium: Pratt & Whitney Stadium at Rentschler Field; Attendance: 15,642; Referee: Marco Ortiz (Mexico)
Note: As with the previous CONCACAF Champions League match, New York City FC's home stadium, Yankee Stadium, as well as its second choice venue, Citi Field, were unavailable because they were not CONCACAF approved venues, and the club's third choice venue, Red Bull Arena, was also unavailable, requiring the team to play elsewhere. New York City FC eventually went for Pratt & Whitney Stadium at Rentschler Field in East Hartford, Connecticut as their venue for the first leg on the quarter-finals.

March 15, 2022 Second leg	Communicaciones (Guatemala)	4–2 (5–5 (a) agg.)	(United States) New York City FC	Guatemala City, Guatemala
10:00 PM EDT	Lezcano 45'; Samayoa 69'; López (yellow card) 72'; L. García 72'; Anangonó (yellow card) 80'; Contreras (yellow card) 29', (goal) 88'	Report	Castellanos 32'; Moralez (yellow card) 45+2'; Talles Magno 53'	Stadium: Estadio Doroteo Guamuch Flores; Attendance: 7,165; Referee: Ricardo Montero (Costa Rica)

==== Semi-finals ====
April 6, 2022 First leg	Seattle Sounders FC (United States)	3–1	(United States) New York City FC	Seattle, Washington
10:00 PM EDT	Rusnák 16'; Morris 34'; Lodeiro 68' (pen.); Arreaga (yellow card) 80'	Report	Thiago Andrade 27'; Morales (yellow card) 79'	Stadium: Lumen Field; Attendance: 31,074; Referee: Enrique Santander (Mexico)

April 13, 2022 Second leg	New York City FC (United States)	1–1 (2–4 agg.)	(United States) Seattle Sounders FC	Harrison, New Jersey
9:00 PM EDT	Castellanos (yellow card) 2'; Rodríguez 51', (yellow card) 90+1'; Callens (yellow card) 90+6'	Report	Ruidíaz 21'; Ragen (yellow card) 45+1'; Frei (yellow card) 84'	Stadium: Red Bull Arena; Attendance: 6,413; Referee: Daneion Parchment (Jamaica)
Note: New York City FC's home stadium, Yankee Stadium, as well as its second choice venue, Citi Field, are unavailable because they are not CONCACAF approved venues, requiring the match to be played at Red Bull Arena.

=== Campeones Cup ===
September 14, 2022
19:30 EDT (UTC−04:00)

New York City FC (United States)	2–0	(Mexico) Atlas
Callens 4'; Moralez 49'	Report

Yankee Stadium, New York, New York
Attendance: 24,823
Referee: Saíd Martínez (Honduras)
