= 2023 New York City FC season =

New York City FC
2023 season
- Head coach: Nick Cushing
- Stadium: Yankee Stadium (The Bronx, New York); Citi Field (Queens, New York) (6 matches)
- MLS: Conference: 11th Overall: 22nd
- MLS Cup Playoffs: Did not qualify
- U.S. Open Cup: Round of 32
- Leagues Cup: Round of 32
- Average home league attendance: 19,816
Home colors	Away colors	Third colors

The 2023 New York City FC season was the club's ninth season in Major League Soccer, the top division of soccer in the United States. The club split its home games between Yankee Stadium and Citi Field, and began play against Nashville SC on February 25, 2023.

== Player movement ==
=== In ===
No.	Pos.	Player	Transferred from	Fee/notes	Date	Source
3	DF	(Argentina) Braian Cufré	(Spain) RCD Mallorca	Loan	February 3, 2023	
6	DF	(United States) James Sands	(Scotland) Rangers F.C.	End of loan	March 1, 2023	
9	ST	(Algeria) Monsef Bakrar	(Croatia) NK Istra 1961	Transfer	July 11, 2023	
10	AM	(Uruguay) Santiago Rodríguez	(Uruguay) Montevideo City Torque	Transfer	March 3, 2023	
27	AM	(Argentina) Maximiliano Moralez	(Argentina) Racing Club de Avellaneda	Transfer	August 8, 2023	
11	FW	(Argentina) Julián Fernández	(Argentina) Club Atlético Vélez Sarsfield	Transfer	August 1, 2023	
16	FW	(Costa Rica) Alonso Martínez	(Belgium) Lommel SK	Transfer	August 2, 2023	
19	ST	(United States) Gabriel Segal	(Germany) 1. FC Köln II	Transfer	January 10, 2023	
20	AM	(United States) Richard Ledezma	(Netherlands) PSV	Loan	March 23, 2023	
35	DF	(Slovenia) Mitja Ilenič	(Slovenia) NK Domžale	Transfer	January 4, 2023	
49	GK	(United States) Matt Freese	(United States) Philadelphia Union	$350,000 in General Allocation Money	January 27, 2023	
15	DM	(United States) Andrés Perea	(United States) Philadelphia Union	Transfer	July 28, 2023	
5	DF	(Norway) Birk Risa	(Norway) Molde FK	Transfer	July 17, 2023	
93	DF	(Mexico) Tony Alfaro	(United States) D.C. United	Transfer	December 22, 2022	

=== Out ===
No.	Pos.	Player	Transferred to	Fee/notes	Date	Source
1	GK	(United States) Sean Johnson	(Canada) Toronto FC	Free transfer	January 27, 2023	
2	LB	(United States) Chris Gloster		Buyout	February 17, 2023	
3	RB	(Sweden) Anton Tinnerholm	(Sweden) Malmö FF	Free transfer	November 14, 2022	
6	CB	(Peru) Alexander Callens	(Spain) Girona FC	Free transfer	January 23, 2023	
8	FW	(Brazil) Thiago Andrade	(Brazil) Athletico Paranaense	Loan	April 3, 2023	
9	ST	(Brazil) Héber	(United States) Seattle Sounders FC	$400,000 of General Allocation Money	December 29, 2022	
10	CAM	(Argentina) Maximiliano Moralez	(Argentina) Racing Club de Avellaneda	Free transfer	December 23, 2022	
11	MF	(Brazil) Gabriel Pereira dos Santos	(Qatar) Al-Rayyan SC	Transfer	July 22, 2023	
12	LB	(Denmark) Malte Amundsen	(United States) Columbus Crew	$500,000 of General Allocation Money	April 25, 2023	
20	AM	(Uruguay) Santiago Rodríguez	(Uruguay) Montevideo City Torque	End of loan	December 31, 2022	
23	MF	(United States) Gedion Zelalem	(Netherlands) FC Den Bosch	Option declined	November 15, 2022	
26	MF	(Uruguay) Nicolás Acevedo	(Brazil) Bahia	Loan	December 20, 2022	
32	DF	(United States) Vuk Latinovich	(Estonia) FCI Levadia Tallinn	Option declined	November 15, 2022	
93	DF	(Mexico) Tony Alfaro	(United States) LA Galaxy	$500,000 of General Allocation Money	July 11, 2023	
4	CB	(Luxembourg) Maxime Chanot	(France) AC Ajaccio	Free	August 29, 2023	

== Current roster ==
As of October 27, 2023

Squad No.	Name	Nationality	Position(s)	Since	Date of birth (age)	Signed from	Games played	Goals
Goalkeepers
1	Luis Barraza	(United States)	GK	2019	November 8, 1996 (age 29)	Chicago FC United	34	0
25	Cody Mizell	(United States)	GK	2021	September 30, 1991 (age 34)	New Mexico United	0	0
49	Matt Freese	(United States)	GK	2023	February 9, 1998 (age 28)	Philadelphia Union	3	0
Defenders
3	Braian Cufré	(Argentina)	LB	2023	December 15, 1996 (age 29)	RCD Mallorca	28	2
4	Maxime Chanot	(Luxembourg)	CB	2016	November 21, 1989 (age 36)	Kortrijk	199	10
5	Birk Risa	(Norway)	CB	2023	February 13, 1998 (age 28)	Molde FK	10	0
12	Malte Amundsen	(Denmark)	LB	2018	February 11, 1998 (age 28)	Vejle	71	1
13	Thiago Martins Bueno	(Brazil)	CB	2022	March 17, 1995 (age 30)	Yokohama F. Marinos	66	0
24	Tayvon Gray	(Jamaica)	RB	2017	August 19, 2002 (age 23)	New York City Academy	81	0
33	Nicholás Enrique Benalcázar	(United States)	CB	2022	June 6, 2001 (age 24)	New York City Academy	1	0
34	Stephen Turnbull (soccer, born 1998)	(United States)	RB	2023	March 13, 1998 (age 27)	NYCFC II	11	0
35	Mitja Ilenic	(Slovenia)	RB	2023	December 26, 2004 (age 21)	NK Domžale	24	0
93	Tony Alfaro	(Mexico)	CB	2023	June 15, 1993 (age 32)	D.C. United	7	0
Midfielders
6	James Sands	(United States)	DM	2017	July 6, 2000 (age 25)	Rangers F.C.	94	0
7	Alfredo Morales	(United States)	DM	2021	May 12, 1990 (age 35)	Fortuna Düsseldorf	86	1
15	Andrés Perea	(United States)	DM	2023	November 14, 2000 (age 25)	Philadelphia Union	10	1
10	Santiago Rodríguez	(Uruguay)	AM	2023	January 8, 2000 (age 26)	Montevideo City Torque	114	18
11	Gabriel Pereira dos Santos	(Brazil)	AM	2022	August 1, 2001 (age 24)	Corinthians	54	15
17	Matías Pellegrini	(Argentina)	CM	2022	March 11, 2000 (age 25)	Inter Miami CF	33	1
20	Richard Ledezma	(United States)	AM	2023	September 6, 2000 (age 25)	PSV	27	0
21	Andres Jasson	(United States)	MF	2020	January 17, 2002 (age 24)	New York Soccer Club	66	4
27	Maximiliano Moralez	(Argentina)	AM	2017	February 27, 1987 (age 39)	Racing Avellaneda	198	35
55	Keaton Parks	(United States)	CM	2019	August 6, 1997 (age 28)	Benfica	151	14
80	Justin Haak	(United States)	CM	2019	September 12, 2001 (age 24)	New York Soccer Club	42	1
Forwards
8	Thiago Andrade	(Brazil)	LW	2021	October 31, 2000 (age 25)	Esporte Clube Bahia	70	12
22	Kevin O'Toole	(Republic of Ireland)	LW	2022	December 14, 1998 (age 27)	Princeton Tigers men's soccer	35	0
43	Talles Magno Bacelar Martins	(Brazil)	AM	2021	June 26, 2002 (age 23)	Vasco da Gama	97	18
9	Monsef Bakrar	(Algeria)	ST	2023	January 13, 2001 (age 25)	NK Istra 1961	13	4
19	Gabriel Segal	(United States)	ST	2023	May 17, 2001 (age 24)	1. FC Köln II	13	2
11	Julián Fernández	(Argentina)	FW	2023	January 30, 2004 (age 22)	Club Atlético Vélez Sarsfield	9	2
16	Alonso Martínez	(Costa Rica)	FW	2023	October 15, 1998 (age 27)	Lommel SK	3	0

== Competitions ==
=== Preseason ===
January 18 1	Minnesota United FC	1–0	New York City FC	Orlando, FL
	Oluwaseyi 90'	NYC Report; MLS Report

January 24 2	San Jose Earthquakes	2–2	New York City FC	Santa Barbara, CA
	30'; 53'	NYC Report; SJE Report	Jiménez 65' (pen.); Haxhari 72'

January 28 3	Los Angeles FC	1–1	New York City FC	Los Angeles, CA
	30'	Report	Magno 32' (pen.)

February 4 4	LA Galaxy	1–2	New York City FC	Los Angeles, CA
	Hernández 52'; Costa (penalty missed) 90'	Report	Andrade 37'; Denis 82'

February 15 5	St. Louis City SC	3–3	New York City FC	Indio, CA

February 15 6	San Diego Loyal SC	Cancelled	New York City FC	Indio, CA
		Report

February 18 7	Portland Timbers	1–0	New York City FC	Indio, CA

=== Friendlies ===
November 10 Friendly	Inter Miami CF	1–2	New York City FC	Fort Lauderdale, Florida
8:00p.m. EST	Robinson 81'	Report	Magno 43'; Fernandez 48'	Stadium: DRV PNK Stadium; Referee: Ismir Pekmic

=== Major League Soccer ===
==== League tables ====
===== Eastern Conference =====
MLS Eastern Conference table (2023)
Pos	Team	Pld	W	L	T	GF	GA	GD	Pts	Qualification
9	Charlotte FC	34	10	11	13	45	52	−7	43	MLS Cup Wild Card
10	CF Montréal	34	12	17	5	36	52	−16	41	
11	New York City FC	34	9	11	14	35	39	−4	41	
12	D.C. United	34	10	14	10	45	49	−4	40	
13	Chicago Fire FC	34	10	14	10	39	51	−12	40	

Source: MLS
Rules for classification: 1) points; 2) total wins; 3) total goal differential; 4) total goals scored; 5) fewer disciplinary points; 6) away goal differential; 7) away goals scored; 8) home goals differential; 9) home goals scored; 10) coin toss (2 clubs tied) or drawing of lots (≥3 clubs tied)

===== Overall =====
Overall MLS standings table
Pos	Team	Pld	W	L	T	GF	GA	GD	Pts
20	CF Montréal	34	12	17	5	36	52	−16	41
21	Minnesota United FC	34	10	13	11	46	51	−5	41
22	New York City FC	34	9	11	14	35	39	−4	41
23	D.C. United	34	10	14	10	45	49	−4	40
24	Chicago Fire FC	34	10	14	10	39	51	−12	40

Source: MLS
Rules for classification: 1) points; 2) total wins; 3) total goal differential; 4) total goals scored; 5) fewer disciplinary points; 6) away goal differential; 7) away goals scored; 8) home goals differential; 9) home goals scored; 10) coin toss (2 clubs tied) or drawing of lots (≥3 clubs tied)

===== Match results =====
February 25 1	Nashville SC	2–0	New York City FC	Nashville, TN
4:30 PM EST	Zimmerman 34'; Shaffelburg (yellow card) 58', (goal) 80'	Report	Cufré (yellow card) 28'; Talles Magno (yellow card) 62'; Thiago (yellow card) 75'; Chanot (yellow card) 90+3'	Stadium: Geodis Park; Attendance: 28,051; Referee: Armando Villarreal

March 4 2	Chicago Fire	1–1	New York City FC	Chicago, IL
8:30 PM EST	Pineda (yellow card) 34'; Herbers 75'	Report	Perreira 39'; Pellegrini (yellow card) 44'; Jasson (yellow card) 58'	Stadium: Soldier Field; Attendance: 19,671; Referee: Filip Dujic

March 11 3	New York City FC	1–0	Inter Miami FC	New York, NY
7:30 PM EST	Cufré (yellow card) 32'; McVey 36' (o.g.); Ilenic (yellow card) 53'; Pellegrini (yellow card) 70'; Gray (yellow card) 77'	Report	Negri (yellow card) 6'; Mota (yellow card) 47'; Yedlin (yellow card) 51'; Kryvtsov (yellow card) 59'	Stadium: Yankee Stadium; Attendance: 24,489; Referee: Lukasz Szpala

March 18 4	New York City FC	3–2	D.C. United	New York, NY
7:30 PM EST	Talles Magno 17'; Rodríguez 37', (yellow card) 53'; Pellegrini (yellow card) 73'; Andrade 88'	Report	Canouse (yellow card) 8'; Benteke 46'; Pálsson (yellow card) 49'; Jeahze (yellow card) 58'; Birnbaum 90'	Stadium: Yankee Stadium; Attendance: 17,281; Referee: Mark Allatin

March 25 5	Houston Dynamo FC	1–0	New York City FC	Houston, TX
8:30 PM EST	Artur (yellow card) 18'; Bassi 55' (pen.); Dorsey (yellow card) 90'	Report	Parks (yellow card) 29'; Rodríguez (yellow card) 55'; Gray (yellow card) 90+3'; Barraza (yellow card) 90+9'	Stadium: Shell Energy Stadium; Attendance: 13,024; Referee: Guido Gonzales Jr.

April 1 6	New England Revolution	1–1	New York City FC	Foxborough, MA
7:30 PM EST	Gil 70'	Report	Ilenič (yellow card) 32'; Magno 80'	Stadium: Gillette Stadium; Attendance: 18,521; Referee: Ismail Elfath

April 8 7	New York City FC	1–1	Atlanta United FC	New York, NY
7:30 PM EST	Pellegrini (yellow card) 54'; Pereira 72'; Chanot (yellow card) 77'; Ilenic (yellow card) 90+2'	Report	Giakoumakis (yellow card) 45+1', (goal) 70'; Ibarra (red card) 62'	Stadium: Yankee Stadium; Attendance: 20,095; Referee: Drew Fischer

April 15 8	New York City FC	2–1	Nashville SC	New York, NY
7:30 PM EST	Parks 11'; Chanot 25'; Ilenič (yellow card) 45'; Jasson (yellow card) 76'	Report	Mukhtar 81'	Stadium: Citi Field; Attendance: 18,687; Referee: Allen Chapman

April 22 9	New York City FC	3–1	FC Dallas	New York, NY
7:30 PM EST	Rodríguez 44', 50', (yellow card) 90'; Magno 55'	Report	Pomykal (yellow card) 51'; Obrian (yellow card) 66'; Paul Arriola (yellow card) 71'; Jiménez 77'	Stadium: Citi Field; Attendance: 20,922; Referee: Fotis Bazakos

April 29 10	Toronto FC	1–0	New York City FC	Toronto, ON
7:30 PM EST	Sapong 46'; Laryea (yellow card) 65'; Hedges (yellow card) 72'; Johnson (yellow card) 80'	Report	Parks (yellow card) 54'	Stadium: BMO Field; Attendance: 21,847; Referee: Armando Villarreal

May 6 11	Charlotte FC	3–2	New York City FC	Charlotte, NC
7:30 PM EST	Jones (yellow card) 2'; Copetti 8', 39' (yellow card) 66'; Meram (yellow card) 14'; Ledezma 74' (o.g.)	Report	Ledezma (yellow card) 14'; Pereira 37'; Rodríguez 57' (pen.)	Stadium: Bank of America Stadium; Attendance: 30,454; Referee: Chris Penso

May 13 12	New York Red Bulls	1–0	New York City FC	Harrison, NJ
7:30 PM EST	Reyes (yellow card) 67'; Nealis (yellow card) 72'; Fernandez 76'; Cásseres Jr. (yellow card) 88'	Report	Parks (yellow card) 37'	Stadium: Red Bull Arena; Attendance: 23,121; Referee: Ted Unkel

May 17 13	Orlando City SC	1–1	New York City FC	Orlando, FL
7:30 PM EST	Kara 7'; Smith (yellow card) 33'; McGuire (yellow card) 67'	Report	Chanot (yellow card) 71'; Segal 89'	Stadium: Exploria Stadium; Attendance: 17,012; Referee: Sergii Boiko

May 27 14	New York City FC	1–3	Philadelphia Union	New York, NY
7:30 PM EST	Pereira 37'; Gray (yellow card) 38'; Thiago Martins (yellow card) 52'; O'Toole (yellow card) 61'	Report	Glesnes (yellow card) 30'; Carranza 45+1', 45+3'; Gazdag 53' (pen.); Uhre (yellow card) 69'; Bueno (yellow card) 83'	Stadium: Citi Field; Attendance: 22,830; Referee: Guido Gonzales Jr.

May 31 15	New York City FC	1–3	FC Cincinnati	New York, NY
7:30 PM EST	Cufré (yellow card) 41' (goal) 64'; Chanot (yellow card) 53'; Sands (yellow card) 56'; Gray (yellow card) 58'; Pereira (yellow card) 66'; Alfaro (yellow card) 82'; Morales (yellow card) 88'	Report	38' (yellow card) 50' Acosta; (yellow card) 43' Mosquera; (yellow card) 45+5' (goal) 70' (pen.) Vazquez; 59' Barreal; (yellow card) 90+1' Gaddis	Stadium: Yankee Stadium; Attendance: 14,806; Referee: Armando Villarreal

June 3 16	New York City FC	0–0	New England Revolution	New York, NY
3:30 PM EST	Chanot (yellow card) 81'; Cufré (red card) 90+1'	Report	Boateng (yellow card) 43'; Gil (yellow card) 85'	Stadium: Yankee Stadium; Attendance: 22,203; Referee: Rosendo Mendoza

June 10 17	Real Salt Lake	0–0	New York City FC	Sandy, UT
9:30 PM EST	Glad (yellow card) 42'	Report	Pereira (yellow card) 32'; Haak (yellow card) 70'; Barraza (yellow card) 83'; Alfaro (yellow card) 84'	Stadium: America First Field; Attendance: 20,301; Referee: Fotis Bazakos

June 17 18	New York City FC	1–1	Columbus Crew	New York, NY
3:30 PM EST	Cufré (yellow card) 32'; Parks (yellow card) 90'; Segal 90+4'; Rodríguez (yellow card) 90+6'	Report	Ramírez 48'	Stadium: Yankee Stadium; Attendance: 30,615; Referee: Pierre-Luc Lauziere

June 21 19	Atlanta United FC	2–2	New York City FC	Atlanta, GA
7:30 PM EST	Wolff 11'; Cobb (yellow card) 22'; Gutman (yellow card) 75'; Firmino 90+5'	Report	Pereira 1', 56'; Cufré (yellow card) 75'; Pellegrini (yellow card) 81'; Rodríguez (yellow card) 86'	Stadium: Mercedes-Benz Stadium; Attendance: 42,557; Referee: Jon Freemon

June 24 20	Portland Timbers	1–1	New York City FC	Portland, OR
10:30 PM EST	Evander 38', (yellow card) 90+3'; Mabiala (yellow card) 50'; Bravo (yellow card) 70'	Report	Parks 51'; Turnbull (yellow card) 90'	Stadium: Providence Park; Attendance: 22,676; Referee: Nima Saghafi

July 1 21	CF Montréal	0–1	New York City FC	Montreal, QC
7:30 PM EST	Lassiter (yellow card) 30'	Report	Pellegrini (yellow card) 29', (goal) 33'; Ilenic (yellow card) 64'; Rodríguez (yellow card) 85'	Stadium: Stade Saputo; Attendance: 16,038; Referee: Victor Rivas

July 5 22	New York City FC	1–1	Charlotte FC	New York, NY
7:30 PM EST	Haak (yellow card) 58'; Cufré 81'; Parks (yellow card) 88'	Report	Gaines II 17'; Świderski (yellow card) 58'; Tuiloma (yellow card) 90+2'	Stadium: Citi Field; Attendance: 15,122; Referee: Filip Dujic

July 8 23	Columbus Crew	1–1	New York City FC	Columbus, OH
7:30 PM EST	Zelarayán (yellow card) 41'; Hernández (yellow card) 45+2' (yellow-red card) 68'; Amundsen (yellow card) 57'; Nagbe (yellow card) 64'; Zawadzki (yellow card) 85', (goal) 90+4'; Degenek (yellow card) 90+9'	Report	Barraza (yellow card) 13'; Rodríguez (yellow card) 68'; Haak 75', (yellow card) 90+12'; Cufré (yellow card) 90+8'	Stadium: Lower.com Field; Attendance: 20,533; Referee: Sergii Boiko

July 15 24	Philadelphia Union	2–1	New York City FC	Chester, PA
7:30 PM EST	Martínez 23'; Donovan 81'	Report	Jasson 86'	Stadium: Subaru Park; Attendance: 19,363; Referee: Alex Chilowicz

August 20 25	New York City FC	0–2	Minnesota United FC	New York, NY
7:30 PM EST	Sands (yellow card) 32'; Pellegrini (yellow card) 39'	Report	Greguš 53'; Trapp (yellow card) 60'; Reynoso (yellow card) 62'; García 90+5'	Stadium: Citi Field; Attendance: 18,606; Referee: Nima Saghafi

August 26 26	FC Cincinnati	3–0	New York City FC	Cincinnati, OH
7:30 PM EST	Boupendza 6'; Miazga (yellow card) 45'; Kubo (yellow card) 50'; Moreno 52'; Hagglund 59'	Report	Risa (yellow card) 88'; Perea (yellow card) 90+2'	Stadium: TQL Stadium; Attendance: 25,513; Referee: Chris Penso

August 30 27	New York City FC	2–0	CF Montréal	New York, NY
7:30 PM EST	Jasson 30'; Bakrar 37'; Perea (yellow card) 58'	Report	Waterman (yellow card) 45'	Stadium: Yankee Stadium; Attendance: 15,273; Referee: Fotis Bazakos

September 2 28	New York City FC	1–1	Vancouver Whitecaps FC	New York, NY
3:30 PM EST	Perea (yellow card) 20'; Rodríguez (yellow card) 37'; Bakrar 55'; Sands (yellow card) 57'	Report	Laborda (yellow card) 28'; Gauld 60' (pen.); Berhalter (yellow card) 90+1'	Stadium: Yankee Stadium; Attendance: 17,942; Referee: Pierre-Luc Lauziere

September 16 29	New York City FC	0–0	New York Red Bulls	New York, NY
3:30 PM EST	Pellegrini (yellow card) 42'; Morales (yellow card) 63'; Sands (yellow card) 90+3'	Report	Barlow (yellow card) 48'; Ndam (yellow card) 69'; Harper (yellow card) 90+7'	Stadium: Yankee Stadium; Attendance: 29,657; Referee: Joseph Dickerson

September 20 30	New York City FC	2–0	Orlando City SC	New York, NY
7:30 PM EST	Bakrar 37'; Ledezma (yellow card) 41'; Talles Magno 68'	Report	Pereyra (yellow card) 45+1'; Cartagena (yellow card) 54'	Stadium: Citi Field; Attendance: 15,238; Referee: Ismail Elfath

September 24 31	New York City FC	3–0	Toronto FC	Harrison, NJ
1:00 PM EST	Perea 2'; Bakrar (penalty missed) 31'; Jasson 45+4'; Fernández 54', (yellow card) 90+2'	Report	O'Neill (yellow card) 30'	Stadium: Red Bull Arena; Attendance: 7,417; Referee: Sergii Boiko
Note: Match postponed from September 23 due to water main break at Red Bull Arena.

September 30 32	Inter Miami CF	1–1	New York City FC	Fort Lauderdale, FL
8:30 PM EST	Cremaschi (yellow card) 33'; Avilés (yellow card) 40', (goal) 90+5'; Farías (yellow card) 62'; Kryvtsov (yellow card) 69'; Arroyo (yellow card) 70'; Allen (yellow card) 90+8'	Report	Ledezma (yellow card) 52'; Rodríguez 77'; Jasson (yellow card) 81'	Stadium: DRV PNK Stadium; Attendance: 20,135; Referee: Victor Rivas
Note: Match delayed an hour due to lightning in the area

October 7 33	D.C. United	2–0	New York City FC	Washington, DC
7:30 PM EST	Klich 45', (yellow card) 90+2'; Birnbaum (yellow card) 45+1'; Durkin 62'; Canouse (yellow card) 67'	Report	O'Toole (yellow card) 75'; Perea (yellow card) 90+6'	Stadium: Audi Field; Attendance: 19,215; Referee: Fotis Bazakos

October 21 34	New York City FC	1–0	Chicago Fire FC	New York, NY
6:00 PM EST	Fernández 64'; Rodríguez (yellow card) 78'; O'Toole (yellow card) 89'; Perea (yellow card) 90+4'	Report		Stadium: Citi Field; Attendance: 23,260; Referee: Allen Chapman

=== Leagues Cup ===
The Leagues Cup took place from July 21 to August 19. New York City FC entered in the group stage as a seeded team, based on the 2022 Major League Soccer standings.

==== East 3 ====
Pos	Team	Pld	W	PW	PL	L	GF	GA	GD	Pts	Qualification	ATL	NYC	TOR
1	(Mexico) Atlas	2	2	0	0	0	2	0	+2	6	Advance to knockout stage	—	—	1–0
2	(United States) New York City FC	2	1	0	0	1	5	1	+4	3	Advance to knockout stage	0–1	—	5–0
3	(Canada) Toronto FC	2	0	0	0	2	0	6	−6	0		—	—	—

Source: Leagues Cup
Rules for classification: Tiebreakers

July 23, 2023 Group stage	New York City FC (United States)	0–1	(Mexico) Atlas	New York, NY
19:00 ET	Chanot (yellow card) 20'	Report	Rocha 7'; Santamaría (yellow card) 14'; Martínez (yellow card) 58'; Rocha (yellow card) 86'	Stadium: Citi Field; Attendance: 22,267; Referee: Bryan López

July 26, 2023 Group stage	New York City FC (United States)	5–0	(Canada) Toronto FC	Harrison, NJ
19:30 ET	Chanot 30'; Bakrar 45'; Rodríguez 45+2', 75'; Jasson 56'; Gray (yellow card) 90'	Report	O'Neill (yellow card) 38' (yellow-red card) 84'; Mabika (yellow card) 90'	Stadium: Red Bull Arena; Attendance: 7,417; Referee: Guillermo Pacheco Larios

August 3, 2023 R32	New York Red Bulls (United States)	1–0	(United States) New York City FC	Harrison, NJ
20:00 ET	Fernandez 31' (pen.), (yellow card) 59'; Amaya (yellow card) 34'; Reyes (yellow card) 48'; Tolkin (yellow card) 63'; Luquinhas (yellow card) 75'	Report	Gray (yellow card) 28'; Parks (yellow card) 59'; Rodríguez (yellow card) 78'	Stadium: Red Bull Arena; Attendance: 11,004; Referee: Daniel Quintero Huitrón

=== U.S. Open Cup ===
New York City FC entered the Open Cup in the Round of 32, based on the 2022 Major League Soccer standings.

May 10 Round of 32	FC Cincinnati (MLS) (Ohio)	1–0	(New York (state)) New York City FC (MLS)	Cincinnati, OH
7:00 PM EDT	(yellow card) 11' Nwobodo; (yellow card) 20' Mosquera; 56' Vazquez; (yellow card) 81' Miazga	Report	(yellow card) 82' Gray; (yellow card) 89' Haak	Stadium: TQL Stadium; Attendance: 7,196; Referee: Timothy Ford
