= 2021 MLS Cup playoffs =

2021 edition of the MLS Cup playoffs tournament

Tournament details
- Country: United States; Canada
- Dates: November 20 – December 11
- Teams: 14

Final positions
- Champions: New York City FC (1st title)
- Runners-up: Portland Timbers
- Semifinalists: Philadelphia Union; Real Salt Lake

Tournament statistics
- Matches played: 13
- Goals scored: 32 (2.46 per match)
- Attendance: 299,891 (23,069 per match)
- Top goal scorer(s): (Argentina) Taty Castellanos (Germany) Hany Mukhtar (3 goals each)

The 2021 MLS Cup playoffs (branded as the Audi 2021 MLS Cup Playoffs for sponsorship reasons) was the 26th edition of the MLS Cup playoffs, the post-season championship of Major League Soccer (MLS), the top soccer league in the United States and Canada. The tournament culminated the 2021 MLS regular season. The tournament began on November 20 and concluded with MLS Cup 2021 on December 11.

The Columbus Crew were the defending MLS Cup champions, but failed to qualify for the playoffs after finishing ninth in the Eastern Conference.

The 2021 playoffs marked the first time since 2004 that no teams from Texas qualified, and the first time ever that no teams from California qualified. This was also the only time that no teams from the Los Angeles area qualified.

== Qualified teams ==
Eastern Conference

- Atlanta United FC
- Nashville SC
- New England Revolution
- New York City FC
- New York Red Bulls
- Orlando City SC
- Philadelphia Union

Western Conference

- Colorado Rapids
- Minnesota United FC
- Portland Timbers
- Real Salt Lake
- Seattle Sounders FC
- Sporting Kansas City
- Vancouver Whitecaps FC

== Conference standings ==
The top seven teams in the Eastern and Western Conference qualified for the MLS Cup playoffs, with the conference champions receiving second round byes. Background colors denote playoff teams, with green also qualifying for the 2022 CONCACAF Champions League.

Eastern Conference

Pos	Team	Pld	Pts
1	New England Revolution	34	73
2	Philadelphia Union	34	54
3	Nashville SC	34	54
4	New York City FC	34	51
5	Atlanta United FC	34	51
6	Orlando City SC	34	51
7	New York Red Bulls	34	48

Source: MLS

Western Conference

Pos	Team	Pld	Pts
1	Colorado Rapids	34	61
2	Seattle Sounders FC	34	60
3	Sporting Kansas City	34	58
4	Portland Timbers	34	55
5	Minnesota United FC	34	49
6	Vancouver Whitecaps FC	34	49
7	Real Salt Lake	34	48

Source: MLS

== Bracket ==
First round November 20–23	Conference semifinals November 25–30
E1	New England Revolution	2 (3)
E4	New York City FC (p)	2 (5)
E4	New York City FC	2
E5	Atlanta United FC	0
Eastern Conference
E3	Nashville SC	3
E6	Orlando City SC	1
E3	Nashville SC	1 (0)
E2	Philadelphia Union (p)	1 (2)
E2	Philadelphia Union (a.e.t.)	1
E7	New York Red Bulls	0
W1	Colorado Rapids	0
W4	Portland Timbers	1
W4	Portland Timbers	3
W5	Minnesota United FC	1
Western Conference
W3	Sporting Kansas City	3
W6	Vancouver Whitecaps FC	1
W3	Sporting Kansas City	1
W7	Real Salt Lake	2
W2	Seattle Sounders FC	0 (5)
W7	Real Salt Lake (p)	0 (6)

Conference finals December 4–5
E4	New York City FC	2
E2	Philadelphia Union	1
W4	Portland Timbers	2
W7	Real Salt Lake	0

MLS Cup; December 11
E4	New York City FC (p)	1 (4)
W4	Portland Timbers	1 (2)

Note: The higher seeded teams hosted matches, with the MLS Cup host determined by overall points.

== First round ==
The second through fourth-seeded teams in each conference hosted the first round matches. The team with the best record in each conference received a bye to the conference semifinals.

=== Eastern Conference ===
November 20
2:30 pm EST

Philadelphia Union	1–0 (a.e.t.)	New York Red Bulls
Glesnes 120+3'	Report

Subaru Park, Chester, Pennsylvania
Attendance: 18,623
Referee: Fotis Bazakos

November 21
3:00 pm EST

New York City FC	2–0	Atlanta United FC
Castellanos 49'; Callens 53'	Report

Yankee Stadium, New York City, New York
Attendance: 25,267
Referee: Chris Penso

November 23
7:00 pm CST

Nashville SC	3–1	Orlando City SC
Mukhtar 21', 74'; Cádiz 90+4'	Report	Dike 14'

Nissan Stadium, Nashville, Tennessee
Attendance: 26,043
Referee: Ismail Elfath

=== Western Conference ===
November 20
4:00 pm CST

Sporting Kansas City	3–1	Vancouver Whitecaps FC
Shelton 17'; Isimat-Mirin 45+3'; Zusi 58'	Report	Dájome 39' (pen.)

Children's Mercy Park, Kansas City, Kansas
Attendance: 19,817
Referee: Alan Kelly

November 21
2:30 pm PST

Portland Timbers	3–1	Minnesota United FC
Mabiala 43'; Blanco 47', 66'	Report	Fragapane 11'

Providence Park, Portland, Oregon
Attendance: 22,533
Referee: Armando Villarreal

November 23
7:30 pm PST

Seattle Sounders FC	0–0 (a.e.t.)	Real Salt Lake
	Report
Penalties
Ruidíaz (penalty scored); João Paulo (penalty scored); Cissoko (penalty scored); A. Roldan (penalty scored); Lodeiro (penalty scored); Rowe (penalty missed)	5–6	(penalty scored) Herrera; (penalty scored) Ruíz; (penalty scored) Kreilach; (penalty scored) Wood; (penalty scored) Silva; (penalty scored) Glad

Lumen Field, Seattle, Washington
Attendance: 34,012
Referee: Joe Dickerson

== Conference semifinals ==
The higher-seeded teams in each match-up as determined by regular season ranking hosted the matches.

=== Eastern Conference ===
November 28
5:30 pm EST

Philadelphia Union	1–1 (a.e.t.)	Nashville SC
Gazdag 45+2'	Report	Mukhtar 38'
Penalties
Elliott (penalty scored); Santos (penalty missed); McGlynn (penalty scored)	2–0	(penalty missed) Mukhtar; (penalty missed) Godoy; (penalty missed) Muyl; (penalty missed) Zimmerman

Subaru Park, Chester, Pennsylvania
Attendance: 19,076
Referee: Allen Chapman

November 30
7:30 PM EST

New England Revolution	2–2 (a.e.t.)	New York City FC
Buksa 9'; Buchanan 118'	Report	Rodríguez 3'; Castellanos 109'
Penalties
Gil (penalty scored); Buksa (penalty missed); Bunbury (penalty scored); Jones (penalty scored)	3–5	(penalty scored) Morales; (penalty scored) Andrade; (penalty scored) Tajouri-Shradi; (penalty scored) Moralez; (penalty scored) Callens

Gillette Stadium, Foxborough, Massachusetts
Attendance: 25,509
Referee: Drew Fischer

=== Western Conference ===
November 25
2:30 pm MST

Colorado Rapids	0–1	Portland Timbers
	Report	Mabiala 90'

Dick's Sporting Goods Park, Commerce City, Colorado
Attendance: 17,438
Referee: Ted Unkel

November 28
2:00 pm CST

Sporting Kansas City	1–2	Real Salt Lake
Russell 24' (pen.)	Report	Julio 72'; Wood 90+1'

Children's Mercy Park, Kansas City, Kansas
Attendance: 21,650
Referee: Kevin Stott

== Conference finals ==
The higher-seeded teams in each conference as determined by regular season ranking hosted the matches.

=== Eastern Conference ===
December 5
3:00 pm EST

Philadelphia Union	1–2	New York City FC
Callens 63' (o.g.)	Report	Moralez 65'; Talles Magno 88'

Subaru Park, Chester, Pennsylvania
Attendance: 19,487
Referee: Ted Unkel

=== Western Conference ===
December 4
3:30 pm PST

Portland Timbers	2–0	Real Salt Lake
Mora 5'; Moreno 61'	Report

Providence Park, Portland, Oregon
Attendance: 25,218
Referee: Alan Kelly

== MLS Cup 2021 ==
The highest-ranked team remaining in the overall table (Portland Timbers) hosted the match.

December 11, 2021
12:00 p.m. PST

Portland Timbers	1–1 (a.e.t.)	New York City FC
Mora 90+4'	Report	Castellanos 41'
Penalties
Mora (penalty missed); Valeri (penalty missed); Moreno (penalty scored); Paredes (penalty scored)	2–4	(penalty scored) Castellanos; (penalty missed) Morales; (penalty scored) Moralez; (penalty scored) Talles Magno; (penalty scored) Callens

Providence Park, Portland, Oregon
Attendance: 25,218
Referee: Armando Villarreal

== Goalscorers ==
Rank	Player	Club	Goals
1	(Argentina) Taty Castellanos	New York City FC	3
1	(Germany) Hany Mukhtar	Nashville SC	3
3	(Argentina) Sebastián Blanco	Portland Timbers	2
3	(Democratic Republic of the Congo) Larrys Mabiala	Portland Timbers	2
3	(Chile) Felipe Mora	Portland Timbers	2
6	(Canada) Tajon Buchanan	New England Revolution	1
6	(Poland) Adam Buksa	New England Revolution	1
6	(Venezuela) Jhonder Cádiz	Nashville SC	1
6	(Peru) Alexander Callens	New York City FC	1
6	(Colombia) Cristian Dájome	Vancouver Whitecaps FC	1
6	(United States) Daryl Dike	Orlando City SC	1
6	(Argentina) Franco Fragapane	Minnesota United FC	1
6	(Hungary) Dániel Gazdag	Philadelphia Union	1
6	(Norway) Jakob Glesnes	Philadelphia Union	1
6	(France) Nicolas Isimat-Mirin	Sporting Kansas City	1
6	(Ecuador) Anderson Julio	Real Salt Lake	1
6	(Brazil) Talles Magno	New York City FC	1
6	(Argentina) Maxi Moralez	New York City FC	1
6	(Colombia) Santiago Moreno	Portland Timbers	1
6	(Uruguay) Santiago Rodríguez	New York City FC	1
6	(Scotland) Johnny Russell	Sporting Kansas City	1
6	(United States) Khiry Shelton	Sporting Kansas City	1
6	(United States) Bobby Wood	Real Salt Lake	1
6	(United States) Graham Zusi	Sporting Kansas City	1
