= Gabriel Pereira (footballer, born 2001) =

Brazilian footballer (born 2001)

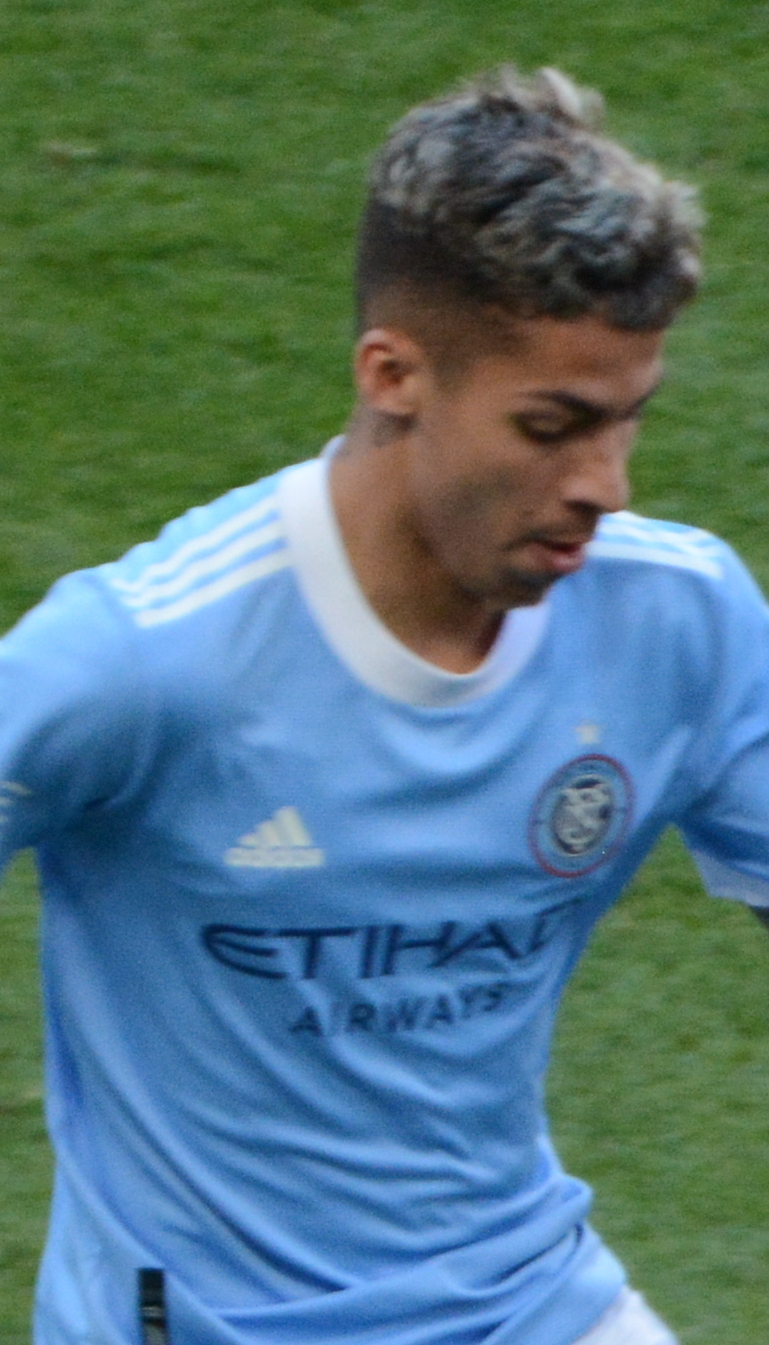
- Pereira with New York City in 2022

Personal information
- Full name: Gabriel Pereira dos Santos
- Date of birth: 1 August 2001 (age 25)
- Place of birth: São Paulo, Brazil
- Height: 1.75 m (5 ft 9 in)
- Positions: Attacking midfielder; winger

Team information
- Current team: Al-Rayyan
- Number: 11

Youth career
- 2018–2020: Corinthians

Senior career*
Years	Team	Apps	(Gls)
2020–2022	Corinthians	43	(2)
2022–2023	New York City	48	(14)
2023–	Al-Rayyan	26	(4)
- * Club domestic league appearances and goals as of 13 September 2024

Gabriel Pereira dos Santos (born 1 August 2001), known as Gabriel Pereira or GP, is a Brazilian professional football player who plays as an attacking midfielder or winger for Qatar Stars League side Al-Rayyan.

== Club career ==
=== Corinthians ===
Gabriel Pereira signed with Corinthians youth squad.

Coming through the youth system, Gabriel made his professional debut for Corinthians in a 2020 Campeonato Brasileiro Série A away match against Atlético Mineiro on 13 August 2020.

=== New York City FC ===
On 17 March 2022, Pereira signed a four-year deal with Major League Soccer club New York City FC.

=== Al-Rayyan ===
On 22 July 2023, Pereira signed with Qatar Stars League side Al-Rayyan for an undisclosed fee reported to be $10,000,000.

== Career statistics ==
Club	Season	League			National cup		League cup		Continental		Total	
Club	Season	Division	Apps	Goals	Apps	Goals	Apps	Goals	Apps	Goals	Apps	Goals
Corinthians	2020	Série A	10	0	—		—		—		10	0
Corinthians	2021	Série A	21	2	1	0	7 (Note: Appearances in Campeonato Paulista)	0	3	0	32	2
Corinthians	2022	Série A	0	0	0	0	5 (Note: Appearances in Campeonato Paulista)	0	0	0	5	0
Corinthians	Total		31	2	1	0	12	0	3	0	47	2
New York City FC	2022	MLS	26	8	2	0	3	1	2 (Note: 1 Appearance in Campeones Cup and 1 appearance in CONCACAF Champions League)	0	33	9
New York City FC	2023	MLS	22	6	1	0	—		—		23	6
New York City FC	Total		48	14	3	0	3	1	2	0	56	15
Al-Rayyan	2022–23	QSL	22	3	3	0	0	0	0	0	25	3
Al-Rayyan	2024–25	QSL	4	1	0	0	2	1	0	0	6	2
Career total			105	20	7	0	17	2	5	1	134	22

== Honours ==
New York City FC

- Campeones Cup: 2022
