= Nicolás Acevedo =

Uruguayan footballer (born 1999)

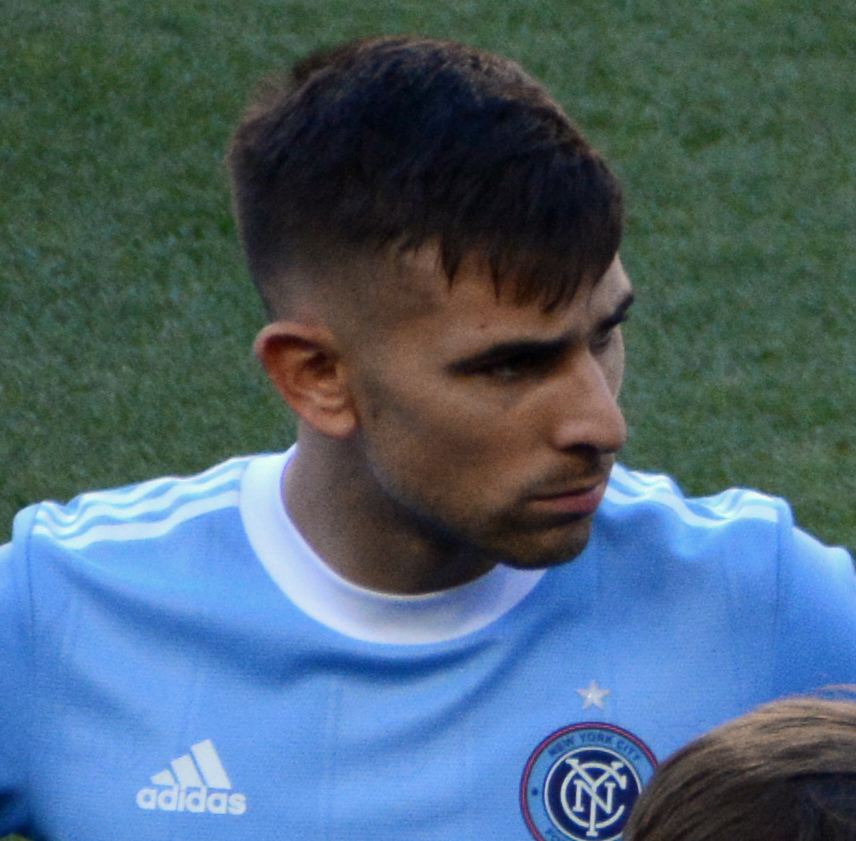
- Acevedo with New York City FC in 2022

Personal information
- Full name: Nicolás Brian Acevedo Tabárez
- Date of birth: 14 April 1999 (age 27)
- Place of birth: Montevideo, Uruguay
- Height: 1.73 m (5 ft 8 in)
- Position: Midfielder

Team information
- Current team: Bahia
- Number: 5

Youth career
- 2011–2018: Liverpool Montevideo

Senior career*
Years	Team	Apps	(Gls)
2018–2020	Liverpool Montevideo	35	(0)
2020–2024	New York City FC	67	(0)
2023–2024	→ Bahia (loan)	48	(0)
2025–	Bahia	75	(2)

International career
2018–2019	Uruguay U20	17	(2)
2020	Uruguay U23	7	(0)
- * Club domestic league appearances and goals as of 21:52, 10 November 2026 (UTC)

Nicolás Brian Acevedo Tabárez (born 14 April 1999) is a Uruguayan professional footballer who plays as a midfielder for Campeonato Brasileiro Série A club Bahia.

== Club career ==
A youth academy graduate of Liverpool Montevideo, Acevedo made his professional debut on 14 October 2018 in a 2–1 win against Defensor Sporting.

=== New York City FC ===
On 2 March 2020, MLS side New York City FC announced the signing of Acevedo on a permanent transfer using allocation money.

=== Bahia ===
On 20 December 2022, it was announced that Acevedo would spend the entirety of 2023 on loan with Brazilian side Bahia. He was permanently transferred to Bahia for an undisclosed amount following the 2024 MLS Season.

== International career ==
Acevedo is a former Uruguay youth international. He has represented Uruguay at 2019 South American U-20 Championship and 2019 FIFA U-20 World Cup.

== Personal life ==
Nicolás is the younger brother of Deportes Temuco forward Luis Acevedo.

== Career statistics ==
=== Club ===
As of 10 November 2026

Club	Season	League			Cup		Continental		State League (Note: Includes Campeonato Baiano.)		Other		Total	
Club	Season	Division	Apps	Goals	Apps	Goals	Apps	Goals	Apps	Goals	Apps	Goals	Apps	Goals
Liverpool Montevideo	2018	Uruguayan Primera División	4	0	—		—		—		—		4	0
Liverpool Montevideo	2019	Uruguayan Primera División	31	0	—		1 (Note: Appearance in Copa Sudamericana.)	0	—		—		32	0
Liverpool Montevideo	Total		35	0	0	0	1	0	—		—		36	0
New York City FC	2020	MLS	12	0	—		1 (Note: Appearance in CONCACAF Champions League.)	0	—		2 (Note: One appearance each in knockout stage of MLS is Back Tournament and MLS Cup Playoffs.)	0	15	0
New York City FC	2021	MLS	24	0	—		—		—		1 (Note: Appearance in Leagues Cup.)	0	25	0
New York City FC	2022	MLS	31	0	2	0	5	0	—		4 (Note: Three appearances in MLS Cup Playoffs, one appearance in Campeones Cup.)	0	42	0
New York City FC	Total		67	0	2	0	6	0	—		7	0	82	0
Bahia	2023	Série A	31	0	8	0	—		9	0	6 (Note: Appearances in Copa do Nordeste.)	0	54	0
Bahia	2024	Série A	8	0	0	0	—		0	0	0	0	8	0
Bahia	2025	Série A	32	0	5	0	5 (Note: Three appearances in Copa Libertadores, two appearances in Copa Sudamericana.)	0	9	1	8	0	59	1
Bahia	2026	Série A	31	1	2	0	2 (Note: Appearances in Copa Libertadores.)	0	3	0	—		38	1
Bahia	Total		102	1	15	0	7	0	21	1	14	0	159	2
Career total			204	1	17	0	14	0	21	1	21	0	277	2

== Honours ==
New York City FC

- Campeones Cup: 2022
- MLS Cup: 2021

Bahia

- Campeonato Baiano: 2023, 2025, 2026
- Copa do Nordeste: 2025
