= Santiago Rodríguez (footballer, born 2000) =

Uruguayan footballer (born 2000)

Personal information
- Full name: Santiago Mariano Rodríguez Molina
- Date of birth: 8 January 2000 (age 26)
- Place of birth: Montevideo, Uruguay
- Height: 1.68 m (5 ft 6 in)
- Position: Attacking midfielder

Team information
- Current team: Columbus Crew
- Number: 8

Senior career*
Years	Team	Apps	(Gls)
2019–2020	Nacional	34	(9)
2020–2023	Montevideo City Torque	3	(1)
2020–2021	→ Nacional (loan)	4	(2)
2021–2022	→ New York City FC (loan)	53	(7)
2023–2025	New York City FC	63	(17)
2025–2026	Botafogo	44	(5)
2026–	Columbus Crew	12	(3)

International career
2014–2015	Uruguay U15	20	(4)
2016–2017	Uruguay U17	21	(0)
2018	Uruguay U18	1	(1)
2018–2019	Uruguay U20	10	(0)
2020	Uruguay U23	8	(0)
Medal record
Men's football
Representing Uruguay
South American Games
Silver medal – second place	2018 Cochabamba	Team
- * Club domestic league appearances and goals as of 8 November 2026

Santiago Mariano Rodríguez Molina (born 8 January 2000) is a Uruguayan professional footballer who plays as an attacking midfielder for Major League Soccer club Columbus Crew.

== Club career ==
Rodríguez is a youth academy graduate of Nacional. He made his official debut for the club in a 2019 Supercopa Uruguaya win against Peñarol on 4 February 2019. On 5 March 2020, he scored a goal 12 seconds into the match against Peruvian club Alianza Lima in the Copa Libertadores.

=== Montevideo City Torque ===
On 3 November 2020, Montevideo City Torque confirmed they had signed Rodríguez, with the midfielder remaining at Nacional for the rest of the year.

=== New York City FC ===
On 9 June 2021, New York City FC confirmed they had signed Rodríguez on loan, with the midfielder joining the Major League Soccer side through to December 2022. He made over 50 league appearances for the club over two seasons, helping the team advance to and eventually win the MLS Cup in 2021. In September 2022, he was named the club's player of the month.

Rodríguez returned to the club on a permanent contract in March 2023, ending months of uncertainty surrounding his future with the club. After returning to Torque, which had loaned Rodríguez to New York City FC, he was subject to interest from Brazilian club Bahia and stated that Major League Soccer needed to "become more important." However, Rodríguez would return to New York City FC as a Designated Player, signing a five-year deal with the club.

=== Botafogo ===
On 22 February 2025, Rodríguez signed for Brazilian club Botafogo on a fee reported to be worth up to $17 million. Rodriguez commented on the move, stating, "I believe it will be an important step to grow and advance my career. I dream of going to Europe, but I want to enjoy Brazilian football and Botafogo first." On 25 August 2026, in what would be his final match for the club, he came on in the 72nd minute and scored a brace in a league match against Athletico Paranaense. However, his efforts were not enough to prevent Botafogo from losing 3–2.

=== Columbus Crew ===
On 2 September 2026, Rodríguez returned to MLS with the Columbus Crew as a Designated Player signing. He scored on his debut just three days later, netting the first goal in the eventual 3–0 victory for his new side.

== International career ==
In 2019, Rodríguez represented the Uruguay under-20 team at the 2019 FIFA U-20 World Cup. In 2020, Rodríguez represented the Uruguay under-23 team at the 2020 CONMEBOL Pre-Olympic Tournament.

== Career statistics ==
As of 21 October 2023

Appearances and goals by club, season and competition
Club	Season	League			National cup (Note: Includes U.S. Open Cup)		Continental		Other		Total	
Club	Season	Division	Apps	Goals	Apps	Goals	Apps	Goals	Apps	Goals	Apps	Goals
Nacional	2019	Uruguayan Primera División	22	6	—		6 (Note: Appearance(s) in Copa Libertadores)	0	1 (Note: Appearance in Supercopa Uruguaya)	0	29	6
Nacional	2020	Uruguayan Primera División	15	3	—		4	2	—		19	5
Nacional	Total		37	9	—		10	2	1	0	48	11
Montevideo City Torque	2021	Uruguayan Primera División	2	0	—		6 (Note: Appearances in Copa Sudamericana)	0	—		8	0
Montevideo City Torque	2023	Uruguayan Primera División	1	1	—		—		—		1	1
Montevideo City Torque	Total		3	1	—		6	0	—		9	1
Nacional (loan)	2020	Uruguayan Primera División	4	2	—		1	0	—		5	2
New York City FC (loan)	2021	Major League Soccer	21	3	—		—		5 (Note: Four appearances and one goal in MLS Cup playoffs, one appearance in Leagues Cup)	1	26	4
New York City FC (loan)	2022	Major League Soccer	32	4	3	1	4 (Note: Appearances in CONCACAF Champions League)	2	4 (Note: Three appearances in MLS Cup playoffs, one appearance in Campeones Cup)	0	43	7
New York City FC (loan)	Total		53	7	3	1	4	2	9	1	69	11
New York City FC	2023	Major League Soccer	31	5	1	0	—		3 (Note: Appearances in Leagues Cup)	2	35	7
Career total			128	24	4	1	21	4	13	3	166	32

== Honours ==
Nacional U20

- U-20 Copa Libertadores: 2018

Nacional

- Uruguayan Primera División: 2019, 2020
- Supercopa Uruguaya: 2019

New York City

- Campeones Cup: 2022
- MLS Cup: 2021

Uruguay U20

- South American Games silver medal: 2018
