= Talles Magno =

Brazilian footballer (born 2002)

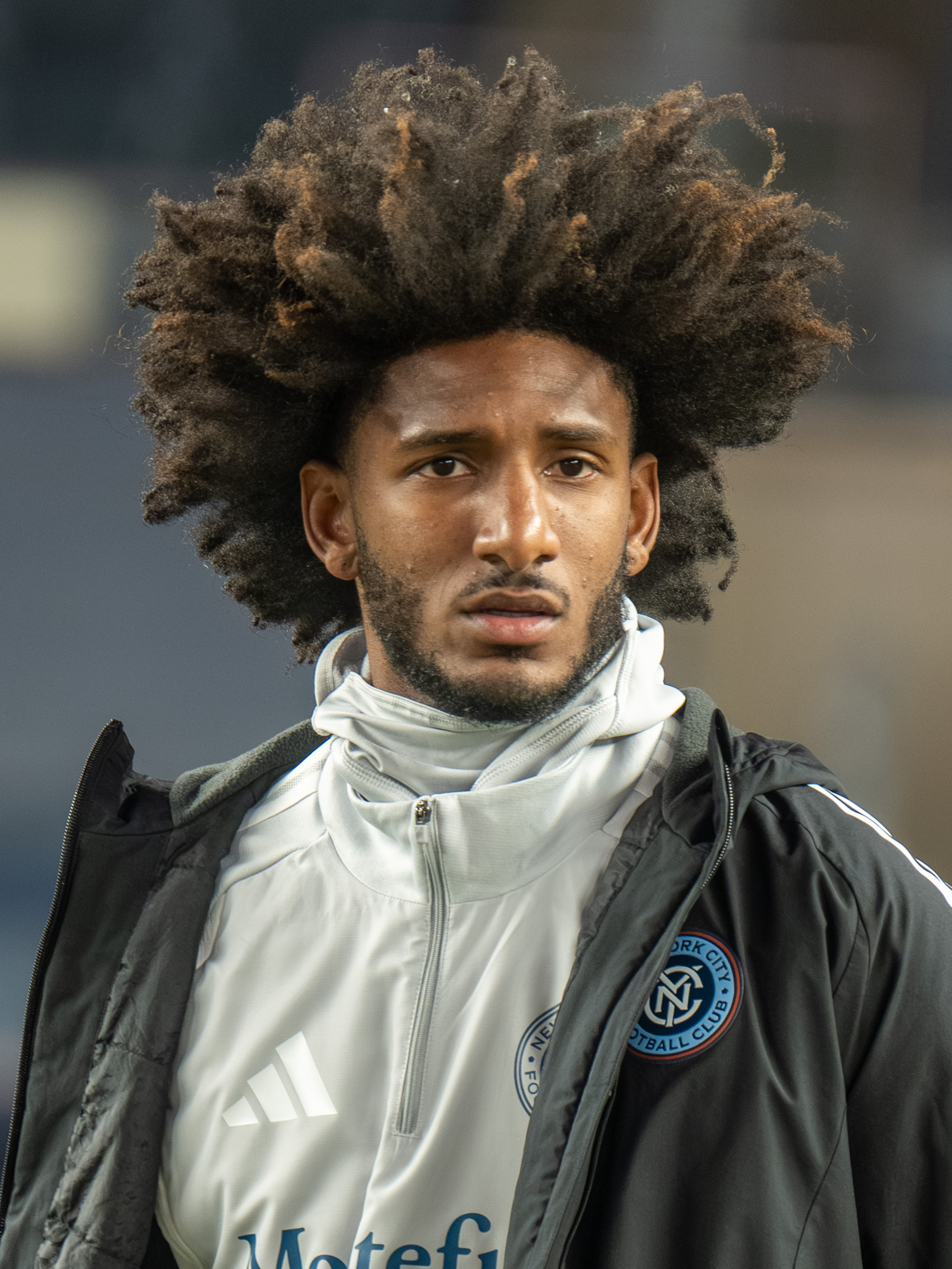
- Talles Magno with New York City FC in 2026

Personal information
- Full name: Talles Magno Bacelar Martins
- Date of birth: 26 June 2002 (age 24)
- Place of birth: Rio de Janeiro, Brazil
- Height: 1.86 m (6 ft 1 in)
- Position: Winger

Team information
- Current team: New York City FC
- Number: 11

Youth career
- Vasco da Gama

Senior career*
Years	Team	Apps	(Gls)
2019–2021	Vasco da Gama	58	(5)
2021–	New York City FC	98	(16)
2024–2025	→ Corinthians (loan)	50	(8)

International career^{‡}
2019	Brazil U17	10	(5)
- * Club domestic league appearances and goals as of 29 September 2026 ‡ National team caps and goals as of 16 August 2019

Talles Magno Bacelar Martins (born 26 June 2002), commonly known as Talles Magno, is a Brazilian professional footballer who plays as a winger for Major League Soccer club New York City FC. He was included in The Guardian's "Next Generation 2019".

== Club career ==
Talles Magno broke into Vasco da Gama's first team in 2019.

On 19 May 2021, Major League Soccer club New York City FC announced the signing of Talles Magno on a permanent deal from Vasco da Gama. He signed a Young Designated Player contract with the club until 2026.

On 9 January 2024, Talles Magno returned to his native Brazil, joining Corinthians on loan until December 2025. At the same time, he extended his contract with NYCFC through until December 2027. Since his arrival in New York, Magno made 100 appearances for the club across all competitions, scoring 19 goals and providing 11 assists.

== International career ==
Magno was a regular with Brazil's youth international sides and scored five goals in 10 appearances for the Brazil U17 national team.

== Career statistics ==
As of match played 8 December 2025

Appearances and goals by club, season, and competition
Club	Season	League			State league (Note: Includes Campeonato Carioca)		National cup (Note: Includes Copa do Brasil, U.S. Open Cup)		Continental		Other (Note: Includes MLS Cup Playoffs, Leagues Cup)		Total	
Club	Season	Division	Apps	Goals	Apps	Goals	Apps	Goals	Apps	Goals	Apps	Goals	Apps	Goals
Vasco da Gama	2019	Série A	15	2	0	0	0	0	0	0	—		15	2
Vasco da Gama	2020	Série A	34	3	6	0	4	0	2 (Note: Appearances in Copa Sudamericana)	0	—		46	3
Vasco da Gama	2021	Série A	—		3	0	1	0	—		—		4	0
Vasco da Gama	Total		49	5	9	0	5	0	2	0	0	0	65	5
New York City FC	2021	MLS	15	2	—		—		—		3 (Note: Appearances in MLS Cup Playoffs)	1	18	3
New York City FC	2022	MLS	34	7	—		3	0	6 (Note: Appearances in CONCACAF Champions League)	3	1	1	44	11
New York City FC	2023	MLS	30	4	—		1	0	—		3 (Note: Appearances in Leagues Cup)	0	34	4
New York City FC	2024	MLS	3	1	—		0	0	—		1	0	4	1
New York City FC	Total		82	14	0	0	4	0	6	3	8	2	100	19
Corinthians (loan)	2024	Série A	14	2	0	0	2	0	3	1	—		19	3
Corinthians (loan)	2025	Série A	24	1	12	5	3	0	9 (Note: Four appearances in Copa Libertadores, three appearances in Copa Sudamericana)	0	—		48	6
Corinthians (loan)	Total		38	3	12	5	5	0	12	1	—		67	9
Career total			169	22	21	5	14	0	20	4	8	2	232	33

== Honours ==
New York City FC

- MLS Cup: 2021
- Campeones Cup: 2022

Corinthians

- Copa do Brasil: 2025
- Campeonato Paulista: 2025

Brazil U17

- FIFA U-17 World Cup: 2019

Individual

- CONCACAF Champions League Best Young Player: 2022
- CONCACAF Champions League Best XI: 2022
