= Thiago Andrade =

Brazilian footballer (born 2000)

Personal information
- Full name: Thiago Eduardo de Andrade
- Date of birth: 31 October 2000 (age 26)
- Place of birth: Araras, Brazil
- Height: 5 ft 11 in (1.80 m)
- Position: Forward

Team information
- Current team: Cerezo Osaka
- Number: 11

Youth career
- –2019: Fluminense
- 2019: Portimonense
- 2019–2021: Bahia

Senior career*
| Years | Team | Apps | (Gls) |
| 2021 | Bahia | 9 | (1) |
| 2021–2024 | New York City FC | 58 | (10) |
| 2023 | → Athletico Paranaense (loan) | 10 | (0) |
| 2024 | → Shenzhen Peng City (loan) | 22 | (2) |
| 2025– | Cerezo Osaka | 54 | (10) |
- * Club domestic league appearances and goals as of 10 August 2026

Thiago Eduardo de Andrade (born 31 October 2000) is a Brazilian professional footballer who plays as a forward for Japanese club Cerezo Osaka in the J1 League.

== Early life ==
Born in Araras, Andrade began his youth career at Fluminense. He later joined Portuguese club Portimonense for six months, before returning to Brazil to join Bahia. He was the top scorer in the Brazil U20 Cup in 2020, earning a call-up to the first team the following year.

== Club career ==
Andrade made his professional debut for Bahia on 6 January 2021 against Grêmio, starting in a 2–1 defeat. He scored his first goal a couple weeks later on 20 January in a 1–0 victory over Athletico Paranaense. In April 2021, he agreed to a mutual termination of his contract with the club.

In April 2021, Andrade joined Major League Soccer club New York City FC on a contract through 2024, with an option for 2025. He made his debut for the club on 19 June 2021, scoring his first goal in the match. In April 2023, Andrade was loaned to Campeonato Brasileiro Série A club Athletico Paranaense on a season-long loan deal with a purchase option. At the end of the year, Athletico Paranaense opted to decline the purchase option and he returned to New York City. In February 2024, he was sent on a season-long loan to Chinese Super League club Shenzhen Peng City.

In December 2024, Andrade was selected by San Diego FC in the 2024 MLS Expansion Draft, before immediately being traded to Toronto FC in exchange for a first-round pick in the 2025 MLS SuperDraft and $250,000 in conditional General Allocation Money. However, he instead chose to transfer to Japanese J1 League club Cerezo Osaka.

== Career statistics ==
As of match played 10 August 2026

Appearances and goals by club, season and competition
| Club | Season | League | | | Playoffs (Note: Includes MLS Cup playoffs) | | National cup (Note: Includes Copa do Brasil, U.S. Open Cup, Chinese FA Cup, Emperor's Cup) | | Continental | | Other (Note: Includes J.League Cup) | | Total | |
| Club | Season | Division | Apps | Goals | Apps | Goals | Apps | Goals | Apps | Goals | Apps | Goals | Apps | Goals |
|---|---|---|---|---|---|---|---|---|---|---|---|---|---|---|
| Bahia | 2020 | Série A | 9 | 1 | — | | — | | — | | 0 | 0 | 9 | 1 |
| Bahia | 2021 | Série A | 0 | 0 | — | | 1 | 0 | — | | 2 (Note: Appearances in Copa do Nordeste) | 0 | 3 | 0 |
| Bahia | Total | | 9 | 1 | 0 | 0 | 1 | 0 | 0 | 0 | 2 | 0 | 12 | 1 |
| New York City FC | 2021 | MLS | 21 | 4 | 1 | 0 | — | | — | | 1 (Note: Appearance in Leagues Cup) | 0 | 23 | 4 |
| New York City FC | 2022 | MLS | 33 | 5 | 2 | 0 | 3 | 1 | 5 (Note: Appearances in CONCACAF Champions League) | 1 | 1 (Note: Appearance in Campeones Cup) | 0 | 44 | 7 |
| New York City FC | 2023 | MLS | 4 | 1 | — | | 0 | 0 | — | | 0 | 0 | 4 | 1 |
| New York City FC | Total | | 58 | 10 | 3 | 0 | 3 | 1 | 5 | 1 | 2 | 0 | 71 | 12 |
| Athletico Paranaense (loan) | 2023 | Série A | 10 | 0 | — | | 2 | 0 | 4 (Note: Appearances in Copa Libertadores) | 0 | — | | 16 | 0 |
| Shenzhen Peng City (loan) | 2024 | Chinese Super League | 25 | 2 | — | | 2 | 1 | — | | — | | 27 | 3 |
| Cerezo Osaka | 2025 | J1 League | 34 | 4 | — | | 3 | 1 | — | | 4 | 3 | 41 | 8 |
| Cerezo Osaka | 2026 | J1 League | 19 | 6 | — | | 0 | 0 | — | | 0 | 0 | 19 | 6 |
| Cerezo Osaka | 2026-27 | J1 League | 1 | 0 | — | | 0 | 0 | — | | 0 | 0 | 1 | 0 |
| Cerezo Osaka | Total | | 54 | 10 | — | | 3 | 1 | 0 | 0 | 4 | 3 | 61 | 14 |
| Career total | | | 156 | 23 | 3 | 0 | 11 | 3 | 9 | 1 | 8 | 3 | 187 | 30 |

== Honours ==
New York City

- MLS Cup: 2021
- Campeones Cup: 2022
