= Vuk Latinovich =

American soccer player (born 1997)

Personal information
- Full name: Vukashin Latinovich
- Date of birth: September 14, 1997 (age 29)
- Place of birth: Brookfield, Wisconsin, United States
- Height: 6 ft 1 in (1.86 m)
- Position: Defender

Team information
- Current team: Brooklyn FC
- Number: 6

Youth career
- Milwaukee Kickers
- 2014–2017: FK Brodarac

College career
Years	Team	Apps	(Gls)
2017–2019	Milwaukee Panthers	57	(11)

Senior career*
Years	Team	Apps	(Gls)
2019	Chicago FC United	9	(0)
2021–2022	New York City FC	8	(0)
2023	Levadia	5	(1)
2023–2024	Ilioupolis	17	(1)
2024	Sandnes Ulf	9	(0)
2025	Orange County SC	25	(2)
2026–	Brooklyn FC	26	(0)
- * Club domestic league appearances and goals as of November 4, 2026

Vukashin Latinovich (born September 14, 1997) is an American professional soccer player who plays as a defender for USL Championship club Brooklyn FC.

== Club career ==
Born in Brookfield, Wisconsin, Latinovich is the son of Rade, a former Marquette Golden Eagles player, and Biljana, a former professional women's handball player. He began his career with the Milwaukee Kickers before joining the youth academy at FK Brodarac in Serbia. After spending four seasons with Brodarac, Latinovich returned to the United States and began playing college soccer for the Milwaukee Panthers. During his three seasons with the Panthers, Latinovich played in 57 games, scoring 11 goals. While in college, Latinovich also spent a season with USL League Two club Chicago FC United, making his debut on May 28, 2019, against Flint City Bucks. He started and played the whole match as Chicago FC United won 5–0.

=== New York City FC ===
On January 21, 2021, Latinovich was selected with the 71st overall pick by New York City FC in the MLS SuperDraft. On April 15, 2021, after impressing during pre-season, Latinovich signed a professional contract with the club.

On May 1, 2021, he made his Major League Soccer debut against the Philadelphia Union, coming on as a late substitute during a 2–0 victory. His contract option was declined on November 15, 2022.

=== FCI Levadia Tallinn ===
On January 26, 2023, he signed with FCI Levadia Tallinn in the Meistriliiga, the top flight of Estonian football.

=== Brooklyn FC ===
On February 3 2026, Brooklyn FC announced they had signed Latinovich to a contract for the 2026 USL Championship season.

== International career ==
While in Serbia, Latinovich was called up into the Serbia under-18 side.

== Career statistics ==
As of match played May 30, 2021

Appearances and goals by club, season and competition
Club	Season	League			National cup		Continental		Total	
Club	Season	Division	Apps	Goals	Apps	Goals	Apps	Goals	Apps	Goals
Chicago FC United	2019	USL League Two	9	0	0	0	—		9	0
New York City FC	2021	Major League Soccer	3	0	0	0	0	0	3	0
Career total			12	0	0	0	0	0	12	0

== Honors ==
New York City FC

- MLS Cup: 2021
- Campeones Cup: 2022
