= Sean Johnson (soccer) =

American soccer player (born 1989)

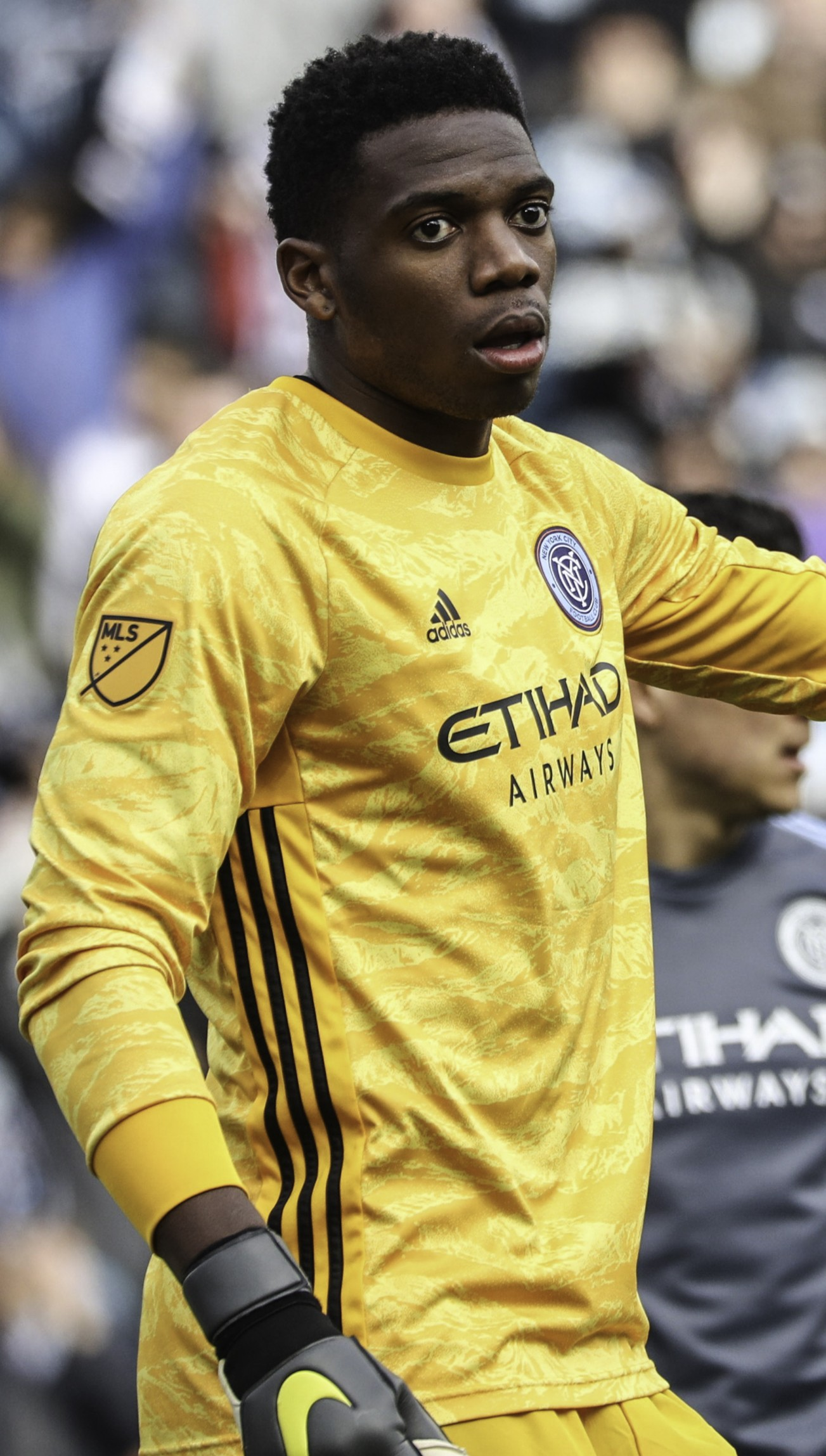
- Johnson with New York City FC in 2019

Personal information
- Full name: Sean Everet Johnson
- Date of birth: May 31, 1989 (age 37)
- Place of birth: Lilburn, Georgia, US
- Height: 6 ft 3 in (1.90 m)
- Position: Goalkeeper

Team information
- Current team: D.C. United
- Number: 1

College career
Years	Team	Apps	(Gls)
2007–2008	UCF Knights	37	(0)

Senior career*
Years	Team	Apps	(Gls)
2009	Atlanta Blackhawks	7	(0)
2010–2016	Chicago Fire	176	(0)
2017–2022	New York City FC	179	(0)
2023–2025	Toronto FC	76	(0)
2026–	D.C. United	31	(0)

International career
2009	United States U20	4	(0)
2012	United States U23	2	(0)
2011–2024	United States	13	(0)
Medal record
Representing United States
Men's soccer
CONCACAF Gold Cup
Winner	2013
Winner	2017
Winner	2021
Runner-up	2019
CONCACAF Nations League
Winner	2022–23
- * Club domestic league appearances and goals as of October 28, 2026

Sean Everet Johnson (born May 31, 1989) is an American professional soccer player who plays as a goalkeeper for Major League Soccer club D.C. United.

== Club career ==
=== College and amateur ===
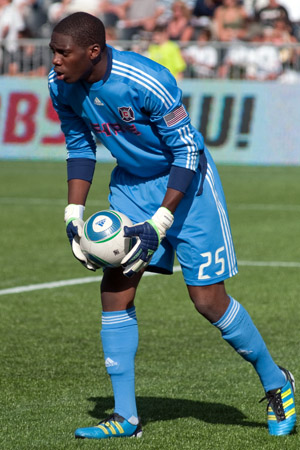
Sean Johnson in 2011

Johnson grew up in Lilburn, Georgia, where he attended Brookwood High School. For a brief period he attended school in California where he played for his high school in Los Angeles County. He would graduate from there in 2005.

Johnson moved to Florida to play college soccer at the University of Central Florida, where he earned Member of the C-USA Commissioner's Honor Roll and was named Team MVP in 2008. He left college early to enter the 2010 MLS SuperDraft as a Generation Adidas player.

During his college years Johnson also played one season with Atlanta Blackhawks in the USL Premier Development League.

=== Professional ===
Sean Johnson was drafted in the fourth round (51st overall) of the 2010 MLS SuperDraft by Chicago Fire. He was the last Generation Adidas player selected in that draft. He made his MLS debut on August 1, 2010, during a 3–2 victory over Los Angeles Galaxy after earning the starting spot over Andrew Dykstra. In his rookie season, he earned back to back "Save of the Week" honors. In 2013, he was named the Chicago Fire's Defender of the Year. He had an 11–9–7 record with the Fire, including with 6 clean sheets.

On December 11, 2016, Atlanta United acquired Johnson from the Chicago Fire for general allocation money. Later that day New York City FC acquired Johnson from Atlanta United in exchange for general allocation money and target allocation money. He made 206 total appearances for NYCFC and won the 2021 MLS Cup with the club as their starting goalkeeper.

On January 27, 2023, Johnson signed a two-year contract with Toronto FC. Following the 2025 season, Johnson became a free agent. On December 23, 2025, Johnson signed a contract with D.C. United through June 2027.

== International career ==
Johnson holds United States and Jamaican citizenships. He had brief tryouts with the Jamaican under-17 team in 2005 and under-20 team in 2008.

Johnson was selected to the United States men's national under-20 team in 2009. He appeared in one match in the 2009 CONCACAF U-20 Championship and later took part in three friendly matches. He also participated in the 2009 FIFA U-20 World Cup as an unused substitute.

Johnson was a member of the under-23 national team that participated in the 2012 Olympic Games qualifying tournament. After an injury to Bill Hamid, Johnson entered the game on the 39th minute of the last group match against El Salvador.

Johnson earned his first senior cap for the United States national team entering as a halftime substitute in a friendly match against Chile on January 22, 2011.

Johnson was named one of three goalkeepers assigned to the United States's 2013 CONCACAF Gold Cup roster by coach Jurgen Klinsmann. He served as second choice keeper to Nick Rimando during a pre-tournament friendly against Guatemala and for the duration of the tournament. Johnson earned his first senior national team start on July 17, 2013, in the final match of the group stage, recording a clean sheet in a 1–0 victory against rival Costa Rica. During that game he made a key save in the 80th minute which led to the US's winning goal. The start officially cap-tied the dual-national Johnson to the United States.

On November 9, 2022, Johnson was named to the United States's roster for the 2022 FIFA World Cup. He did not play during the tournament, serving as a backup to Matt Turner.

Johnson won the 2022-23 CONCACAF Nations League despite not playing during the tournament.

== Personal life ==
His parents, Everet and Joy Johnson, are of Jamaican and African-American descent respectively.

== Career statistics ==
=== Club ===
As of match played October 28, 2026

Appearances and goals by club, season and competition
Club	Season	League			Playoffs (Note: Includes MLS Cup playoffs)		National cup (Note: Includes U.S. Open Cup, Canadian Championship)		Continental		Other		Total	
Club	Season	Division	Apps	Goals	Apps	Goals	Apps	Goals	Apps	Goals	Apps	Goals	Apps	Goals
Atlanta Blackhawks	2009	Premier Development League	7	0	—		—		—		—		7	0
Chicago Fire	2010	Major League Soccer	13	0	—		1	0	2 (Note: Appearances in North American SuperLiga)	0	—		16	0
Chicago Fire	2011	Major League Soccer	28	0	—		4	0	—		—		32	0
Chicago Fire	2012	Major League Soccer	31	0	1 (Note: Appearance(s) in MLS Cup Playoffs)	0	0	0	—		—		32	0
Chicago Fire	2013	Major League Soccer	28	0	—		3	0	—		—		31	0
Chicago Fire	2014	Major League Soccer	33	0	—		4	0	—		—		37	0
Chicago Fire	2015	Major League Soccer	21	0	—		3	0	—		—		24	0
Chicago Fire	2016	Major League Soccer	22	0	—		0	0	—		—		22	0
Chicago Fire	Total		176	0	1	0	15	0	2	0	—		194	0
New York City FC	2017	Major League Soccer	32	0	2	0	1	0	—		—		35	0
New York City FC	2018	Major League Soccer	32	0	3	0	0	0	—		—		35	0
New York City FC	2019	Major League Soccer	29	0	1	0	0	0	—		—		30	0
New York City FC	2020	Major League Soccer	23 (Note: Includes three appearances in MLS is Back Tournament group stage)	0	1	0	—		3 (Note: Appearance(s) in CONCACAF Champions League)	0	2 (Note: Two appearances in MLS is Back Tournament knockout stage)	0	29	0
New York City FC	2021	Major League Soccer	29	0	4	0	—		—		1 (Note: Appearance(s) in Leagues Cup)	0	34	0
New York City FC	2022	Major League Soccer	34	0	3	0	—		6	0	—		43	0
New York City FC	Total		179	0	14	0	1	0	9	0	3	0	206	0
Toronto FC	2023	Major League Soccer	20	0	—		1	0	—		2	0	23	0
Toronto FC	2024	Major League Soccer	25	0	—		2	0	—		3	0	30	0
Toronto FC	2025	Major League Soccer	31	0	—		0	0	—		—		31	0
Toronto FC	Total		76	0	—		3	0	—		5	0	84	0
D.C. United	2026	Major League Soccer	31	0	—		0	0	—		—		31	0
Career total			469	0	15	0	19	0	11	0	8	0	522	0

=== International ===
As of match played June 28, 2023

Appearances and goals by national team and year
National team	Year	Apps	Goals
United States	2011	1	0
United States	2012	1	0
United States	2013	2	0
United States	2014	0	0
United States	2015	1	0
United States	2016	0	0
United States	2017	0	0
United States	2018	0	0
United States	2019	3	0
United States	2020	1	0
United States	2021	0	0
United States	2022	1	0
United States	2023	3	0
Total		13	0

== Honors ==
New York City FC

- MLS Cup: 2021

United States

- CONCACAF Gold Cup: 2013, 2017, 2021
- CONCACAF Nations League: 2022–23

Individual

- MLS Cup MVP: 2021
- MLS All-Star: 2022
