= MLS Cup 2021 =

2021 edition of the MLS Cup

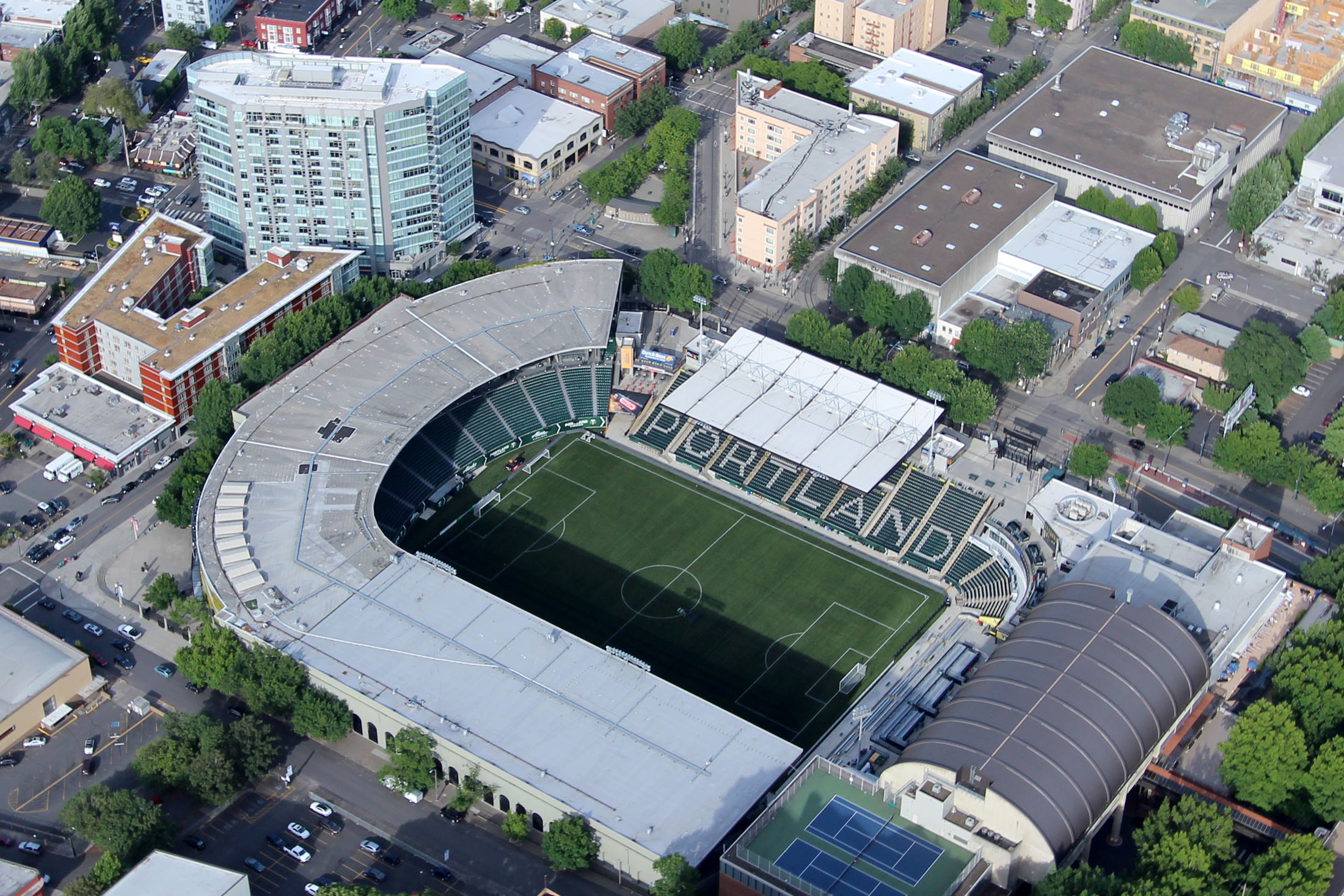
- Aerial view of Providence Park, the host venue of MLS Cup 2021
- Event: MLS Cup
Portland Timbers	New York City FC
1	1
- After extra time New York City FC won 4–2 on penalties
- Date: December 11, 2021
- Venue: Providence Park, Portland, Oregon, U.S.
- MLS Cup MVP: Sean Johnson (New York City FC)
- Referee: Armando Villarreal
- Attendance: 25,218
- Weather: Rain, 49 °F (9 °C)

MLS Cup 2021 was the 26th edition of the MLS Cup, the championship match of Major League Soccer (MLS) at the conclusion of the 2021 MLS Cup Playoffs. The soccer match was played on December 11, 2021, at Providence Park in Portland, Oregon, United States. It was contested by hosts Portland Timbers and New York City FC to determine the champion of the 2021 season.

New York City FC won their first MLS Cup title by defeating the Timbers in a penalty shootout following a 1–1 draw in regulation and extra time. NYCFC goalkeeper Sean Johnson was named the match's most valuable player for his performance in the shootout, which included two saves. The match was broadcast by ABC and drew an audience of 1.14 million viewers in the United States.

== Road to the final ==
The MLS Cup is the post-season championship of Major League Soccer (MLS), a professional club soccer league in the United States and Canada. The 2021 season was the 26th in MLS history, and was contested by 27 teams organized into the eastern and western conferences. Each team played 34 matches during the regular season from April to early November, primarily against intra-conference opponents with the schedule varying based on conference to minimize travel due to the COVID-19 pandemic. The playoffs, running from November to early December, were contested between the top seven clubs in each conference through four rounds. Each round had a single-elimination match hosted by the higher-seeded team; the top team in each conference was also given a bye to the Conference Semifinals.

The finalists, the Portland Timbers and New York City FC (NYCFC), both finished as the fourth seed in the western and eastern conferences, respectively. The Timbers finished with four more points and were named hosts for the MLS Cup final. Portland previously won the MLS Cup in the 2015 final and lost in the 2018 final, while NYCFC had never advanced to a previous final. The two clubs did not play each other in the regular season and last met in the 2020 MLS is Back Tournament quarterfinals, where the Timbers won 3–1. It was the seventh consecutive season where the Western Conference champion was either Portland or their rivals Seattle Sounders FC, who have won the cup twice.

=== Portland Timbers ===
The Portland Timbers had previously won the MLS Cup in 2015 and finished as runners-up in 2018 under new manager Giovanni Savarese. During the pandemic-shortened 2020 season, the club finished as champions of the MLS is Back Tournament in Florida and third in the Western Conference, but were eliminated in the first round of the playoffs by FC Dallas in a penalty shootout. During the 2020–21 offseason, the Timbers traded away two of their left backs, Jorge Villafaña and Marco Farfan, and acquired wingbacks Claudio Bravo and Josecarlos Van Rankin as replacements. The club also signed Chilean striker Felipe Mora to a permanent contract after his one-year loan from Pumas UNAM expired. Portland were expected to rely heavily on their veteran midfield trio of Diego Chará, Diego Valeri, and Sebastián Blanco (who was injured for most of the 2020 season).

Portland started the season with three wins and four losses in their first seven matches, earning nine points and holding seventh place in the Western Conference by June. The Timbers also played in the CONCACAF Champions League, having qualified through the MLS is Back Tournament, and were eliminated in the quarterfinals by Club América in early May. The inconsistent performances were blamed in part on the loss of several key players to injuries, including winger Andy Polo, starting goalkeepers Jeff Attinella and Steve Clark, backup goalkeeper Aljaz Ivacic, and midfielder Diego Chará. By the end of May, ten of their players were listed as injured or otherwise unable to play.

Following an early June break in league play for the 2021 CONCACAF Gold Cup, the Timbers were able to earn a win against Sporting Kansas City and a comeback draw with the Houston Dynamo to reach fifth in the conference. Savarese used different formations in each match to rotate players, switching from a 4–2–3–1 against Kansas City to a 5–2–3 for Houston and a subsequent match against Minnesota United FC that ended in a loss. Portland dropped below the playoffs cutoff to eighth place in the west following road losses to Austin FC, Minnesota, and the LA Galaxy in July; the club had, however, won their two home matches against FC Dallas and Los Angeles FC.

During the summer transfer window, Portland signed midfielders George Fochive as a replacement for Polo and Santiago Moreno as a Young Designated Player; the club also traded Jeremy Ebobisse to the San Jose Earthquakes, a move that opened a starting role for striker Felipe Mora. The Timbers re-entered playoff contention in early August by tying San Jose Earthquakes and defeating Real Salt Lake to begin a three-match homestand, which finished with a 6–2 loss to rivals Seattle Sounders FC. Several prominent players began to return from injuries, including Sebastián Blanco, striker Jarosław Niezgoda, defender Larrys Mabiala, and goalkeeper Steve Clark, but the team remained shorthanded and began a stretch of five away matches by drawing against Austin and losing to Kansas City.

After dropping to ninth place in the west, the Timbers closed out August with a 2–0 win against the Sounders in the middle of five consecutive road matches, but lost midfielder Eryk Williamson for the rest of the season due to an ACL tear. The match was the first of an eight-game undefeated streak (including seven wins) that lasted through September and allowed them to rise up to fourth place in the conference. The streak was snapped by a loss to the LA Galaxy that was followed by two more losses to Vancouver Whitecaps FC and the Colorado Rapids, but Portland remained in fourth place. The Timbers clinched a playoff berth in their last match of October, winning 2–0 against San Jose, and finished the season by defeating Real Salt Lake and Austin FC. Portland finished the 2021 regular season with 55 points and 17 wins, setting a club record for their time in MLS, and earned the fourth playoffs seed in the Western Conference.

Portland began their playoffs run with a 3–1 victory at home against fifth-place Minnesota United FC, breaking a seven-match winless streak against the visitors, in the first round. Franco Fragapane scored the opening goal for Minnesota with a sliding shot in the 11th minute, but Larrys Mabiala's header shortly before half-time tied the match. The Timbers took the lead in the 48th minute with a strike from Blanco, who had been treated for an injury before half-time and went on to score his second goal in the 67th minute with a 22-yard (20 m) shot. Portland advanced to the Conference Semifinals, hosted by the top-seeded Colorado Rapids on Thanksgiving, and won 1–0 with a Mabiala goal in the 90th minute amid a scramble in the penalty area. The team, however, lost Blanco to an injury in the 50th minute and would be without Dairon Asprilla, who was suspended for earning a red card in stoppage time.

The Timbers hosted seventh-place Real Salt Lake, who had produced two upsets in the 2021 playoffs, in a rematch of the 2013 Western Conference Final. Portland took the lead in the fifth minute through a shot by Felipe Mora, who redirected a mishit clearance from RSL defender Aaron Herrera in the penalty area. Santiago Moreno then extended the lead in the 61st minute, scoring his first MLS goal with a strike from 25 yards (23 m) that hit the post and was deflected off goalkeeper David Ochoa into the goal. The Timbers advanced to the MLS Cup final with their 2–0 victory, breaking a winless streak against RSL in playoff matches.

=== New York City FC ===
New York City FC entered the league as an expansion team in 2015 and qualified for the playoffs in six consecutive seasons beginning in 2016. The team reached the Conference Semifinals five times, but had never advanced beyond that stage. The 2020 season, their first under new manager Ronny Deila, ended with a fifth-place finish in the Eastern Conference and a first round exit from the playoffs in a penalty shootout against Orlando City SC. During the offseason, NYCFC traded away former captain Alexander Ring and defender Rónald Matarrita to other MLS clubs and signed several young players in their place. The 2021 season also saw the return of attacking midfielder Maximiliano Moralez, one of two Designated Players on the team, who missed most of the 2020 season due to multiple injuries. Unlike its early seasons where the team relied on veteran players from European leagues, NYCFC had instead opted to invest in younger talent from South America scouted from smaller leagues.

NYCFC started the season with the best goal differential in the Eastern Conference but went winless for three weeks in May and entered the June break in fourth place. The team were then without goalkeeper Sean Johnson and James Sands during the Gold Cup, as well as new signing Talles Magno due to an injury, as they entered a stretch of 10 matches in 36 days beginning in mid-July. The team reached second in the East by early August, but later went on a stretch of 10 matches with only one victory.

NYCFC finished fourth in the East and began their 2021 playoffs run by defeating Atlanta United FC 2–0 in the first round at home, scoring twice within four minutes in the second half. NYCFC advanced to play Supporters' Shield champions New England Revolution in the Conference Semifinals at Gillette Stadium, where they drew 2–2 after extra time despite leading goalscorer Valentín Castellanos being sent off by earning a second yellow card. New York City earned an upset victory by winning the ensuing penalty shootout 5–3 after Adam Buksa's shot was saved by Sean Johnson.

Their Eastern Conference Final opponents, the Philadelphia Union, were unable to field a full roster due to the absence of 11 players—including several starters—required to quarantine under the league's COVID protocols. New York City FC won 2–1 against the Union, conceding first but equalizing within 90 seconds and going on to score a match-winning goal in the 87th minute.

=== Summary of results ===
Note: In all results below, the score of the finalist is given first (H: home; A: away).

Portland Timbers		Round	New York City FC	
4th place in Western Conference: Pos / Team / Pld / Pts; 1 / Colorado Rapids / 34 / 61; 2 / Seattle Sounders FC / 34 / 60; 3 / Sporting Kansas City / 34 / 58; 4 / Portland Timbers / 34 / 55; 5 / Minnesota United FC / 34 / 49; 6 / Vancouver Whitecaps FC / 34 / 49; 7 / Real Salt Lake / 34 / 48; Source: MLS Qualified for playoffs Qualified for CONCACAF Champions League		Regular season	4th place in Eastern Conference: Pos / Team / Pld / Pts; 1 / New England Revolution / 34 / 73; 2 / Philadelphia Union / 34 / 54; 3 / Nashville SC / 34 / 54; 4 / New York City FC / 34 / 51; 5 / Atlanta United FC / 34 / 51; 6 / Orlando City SC / 34 / 51; 7 / New York Red Bulls / 34 / 48; Source: MLS Qualified for playoffs Qualified for CONCACAF Champions League	
Opponent	Score	MLS Cup Playoffs	Opponent	Score
Minnesota United FC	3–1 (H)	First round	Atlanta United FC	2–0 (H)
Colorado Rapids	1–0 (A)	Conference Semifinals	New England Revolution	2–2 (5–3 p) (A)
Real Salt Lake	2–0 (H)	Conference Finals	Philadelphia Union	2–1 (A)

== Venue ==
Providence Park in Portland, Oregon, the home venue of the Portland Timbers, hosted the MLS Cup final for the first time in its history because the Timbers had the best record remaining. It was built as a multi-purpose venue in 1926 and renovated in 2011 into a soccer-specific stadium for the Timbers' MLS debut; following an expansion completed in 2019, Providence Park holds 25,218 spectators. Prior to its renovations, the stadium had hosted the 1977 Soccer Bowl, the championship game of the original North American Soccer League, and several matches during the 1999 and 2003 editions of the FIFA Women's World Cup. The 2015 and 2018 NWSL Championships were also played at Providence Park; the MLS Cup was the third tournament final to be played at the stadium in 2021, following the NWSL Challenge Cup in April and the Women's International Champions Cup in August.

Tickets went on sale on December 7, beginning with season ticket holders who had renewed for the 2022 season and followed by other season ticket holders and the general public. The match was declared sold out within 20 minutes of the first release, with only general admission seating left available, amid an Amazon Web Services outage that affected SeatGeek, the league's ticket vendor. The Timbers Army, the club's largest supporters group, distributed 1,000 priority entry wristbrands for the general admission section the day before the MLS Cup final; a line began forming outside Providence Park several days before. By December 11, ticket prices on secondary and resale markets ranged from $550 to $2,500, with an average of $779.

NYCFC were allocated five sections for away supporters as part of the league's distribution of tickets; the club announced plans to subsidize some tickets, pricing them at $10. The club also hosted an official viewing party for the MLS Cup final at the Hammerstein Ballroom in Manhattan.

== Broadcasting ==
The match was broadcast in the United States on ABC in English and UniMás and TUDN in Spanish. The Canadian broadcast was carried on TSN in English and TVA Sports in French. The ABC broadcast featured Jon Champion as the play-by-play announcer and Taylor Twellman as color commentator, along with Sam Borden as sideline reporter and Mark Clattenburg as rules analyst. It was filmed with 28 cameras, including nine fixed cameras, four goalpost cameras, and a skycam above the pitch. The UniMás broadcast featured commentary from Luis Omar Tapia, Diego Balado, Ramses Sandoval, and Daniel Nohra. The match was also broadcast internationally in 200 countries, including on ESPN International in Latin America, the Caribbean, and Oceania. The national anthem was performed before the match by Portugal. The Man, a Portland-based alternative rock band.

The ABC broadcast was watched by an average of 1.14 million viewers, peaking at 1.63 million during the penalty shootout. It was slightly higher than the Fox broadcast for MLS Cup 2020 and 38 percent higher than the MLS Cup 2019 broadcast on ABC, but lower than the Thanksgiving playoff match featuring Colorado and Portland. The top viewing markets included Portland, where the match garnered a 11.7 rating, Greenville, South Carolina, Seattle, and New York City. The UniMás and TUDN broadcast in Spanish drew 354,000 viewers.

== Match ==
=== Summary ===
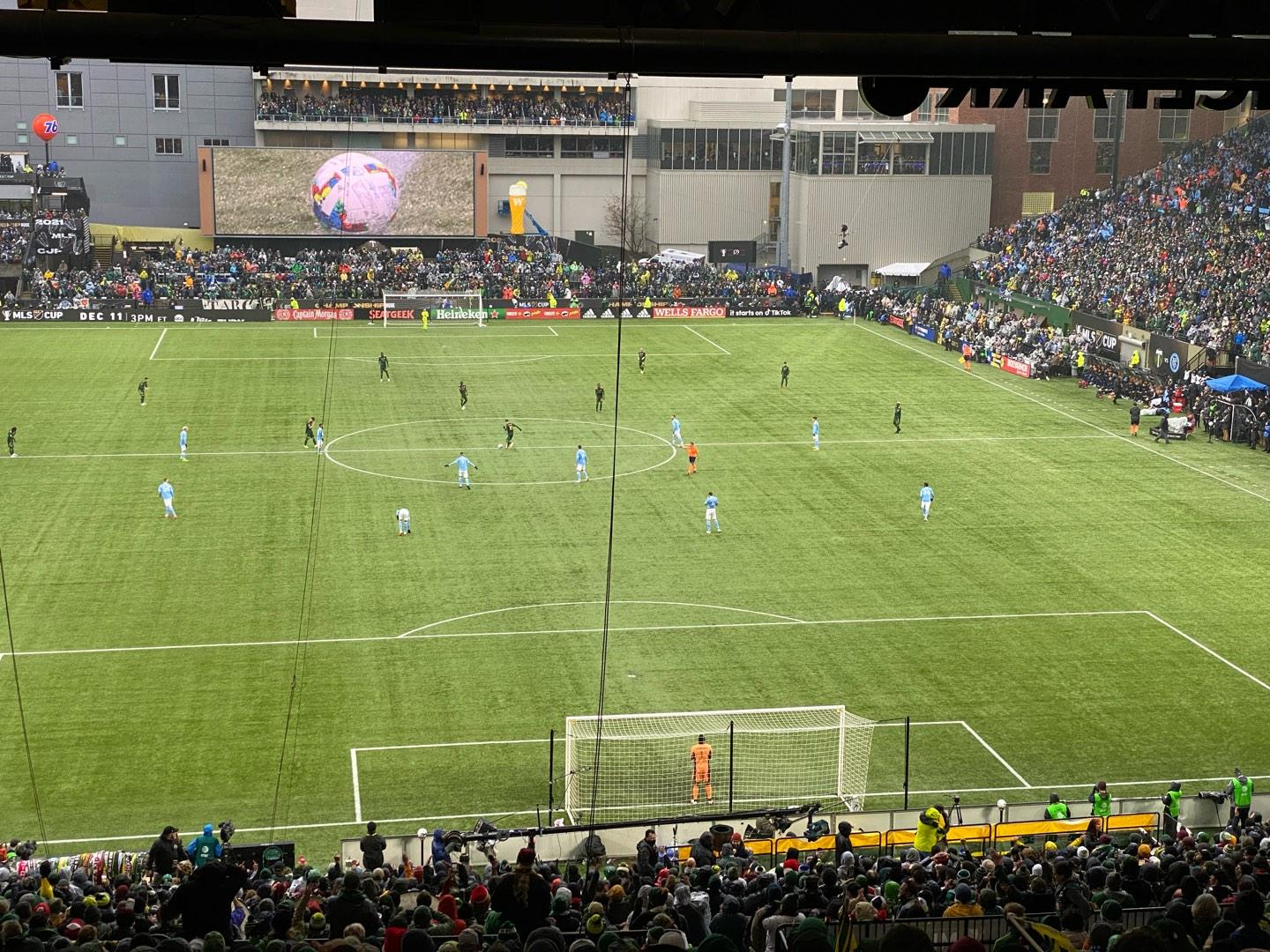
A view of the match from the north stand

The final began at 12:23 p.m. at Providence Park, in front of a sold-out crowd of 25,218 spectators. The official match ball for the 2022 season was used in the match, making an early debut. Valentín Castellanos opened the scoring for NYCFC in the 41st minute through a header off a free kick that slipped through the gloves of goalkeeper Steve Clark. During the goal celebration, Jesús Medina was hit in the face by one of two beer cans thrown from the stands, resulting in a brief pause in the match. The Timbers equalized in the fourth minute of stoppage time, the latest regulation-time goal in MLS Cup history, as Felipe Mora struck from within the penalty area off a rebounded ball. The match remained tied after extra time and proceeded into a penalty shootout, which NYCFC won 4–2 in five rounds. Goalkeeper Sean Johnson (named the match's MVP) made two saves on penalties attempted by Mora and Diego Valeri in the early rounds, while Alexander Callens scored the last kick in the fifth round.

=== Details ===
December 11, 2021
12:00 p.m. PST

Portland Timbers	1–1 (a.e.t.)	New York City FC
Mora 90+4'	Report	Castellanos 41'
Penalties
Mora (penalty missed); Valeri (penalty missed); Moreno (penalty scored); Paredes (penalty scored)	2–4	(penalty scored) Castellanos; (penalty missed) Morales; (penalty scored) Moralez; (penalty scored) Talles Magno; (penalty scored) Callens

Providence Park, Portland, Oregon, U.S.
Attendance: 25,218
Referee: Armando Villarreal

Portland Timbers	New York City FC

GK	12	(United States) Steve Clark
RB	2	(Mexico) Josecarlos Van Rankin	(yellow card) 59'	(substituted off) 89'
CB	33	(Democratic Republic of the Congo) Larrys Mabiala
CB	13	(Croatia) Dario Župarić
LB	5	(Argentina) Claudio Bravo
CM	21	(Colombia) Diego Chará (c)	(yellow card) 90'
CM	20	(United States) George Fochive		(substituted off) 62'
RW	23	(Colombia) Yimmi Chará
AM	10	(Argentina) Sebastián Blanco		(substituted off) 62'
LW	27	(Colombia) Dairon Asprilla		(substituted off) 84'
CF	9	(Chile) Felipe Mora
Substitutes:
GK	31	(Slovenia) Aljaž Ivačič
DF	25	(New Zealand) Bill Tuiloma
DF	28	(Venezuela) Pablo Bonilla
DF	85	(United States) Zac McGraw
MF	8	(Argentina) Diego Valeri		(substituted on) 89'
MF	22	(Paraguay) Cristhian Paredes		(substituted on) 62'
MF	30	(Colombia) Santiago Moreno		(substituted on) 62'
MF	44	(Costa Rica) Marvin Loría
FW	11	(Poland) Jarosław Niezgoda		(substituted on) 84'
Head coach:
(Venezuela) Giovanni Savarese

GK	1	(United States) Sean Johnson (c)	(yellow card) 88'
RB	24	(Jamaica) Tayvon Gray
CB	4	(Luxembourg) Maxime Chanot
CB	6	(Peru) Alexander Callens
LB	20	(Iceland) Guðmundur Þórarinsson		(substituted off) 90+2'
CM	16	(United States) James Sands
CM	7	(United States) Alfredo Morales
RW	19	(Paraguay) Jesús Medina	(yellow card) 90+1'	(substituted off) 95'
AM	10	(Argentina) Maximiliano Moralez
LW	42	(Uruguay) Santiago Rodríguez	(yellow card) 80'	(substituted off) 80'
CF	11	(Argentina) Valentín Castellanos
Substitutes:
GK	13	(United States) Luis Barraza
DF	12	(Denmark) Malte Amundsen		(substituted on) 90+2'
MF	15	(Belize) Tony Rocha
MF	23	(United States) Gedion Zelalem
MF	26	(Uruguay) Nicolás Acevedo
FW	8	(Brazil) Thiago Andrade
FW	9	(Brazil) Héber
FW	17	(Libya) Ismael Tajouri-Shradi		(substituted on) 80'
FW	43	(Brazil) Talles Magno		(substituted on) 95'
Head coach:
(Norway) Ronny Deila

MLS Cup MVP:
Sean Johnson (New York City FC)

Assistant referees:
Frank Anderson
Oscar Mitchell-Carvalho
Fourth official:
Fotis Bazakos
Reserve assistant referee:
Jeremy Hanson
Video assistant referee:
Chris Penso
Assistant video assistant referee:
Cory Richardson

Match rules

- A single match with 90 minutes of regulation time.
- 30 minutes of extra time (divided into 15-minute halves) if necessary.
- Penalty shootout if scores still level.
- Maximum of nine named substitutes.
- Maximum of five substitutions, with a sixth allowed in extra time. Each team was only given three opportunities to make substitutions, with a fourth opportunity in extra time, excluding substitutions made at half-time, before the start of extra time and at half-time in extra time. Two additional substitutions are available for concussed players.

== Post-match ==
NYCFC became the fourteenth team to win the MLS Cup and the first from the New York City area. They also became the fourth City Football Group team to win a national championship in 2021. It was the first top-flight soccer championship for the region since the New York Cosmos won the 1982 Soccer Bowl; the cross-town New York Red Bulls had played in MLS Cup 2008, but lost to the Columbus Crew. The title was also the first for any of the city's major professional sports team since the New York Giants won Super Bowl XLVI in 2012. As MLS Cup champions, NYCFC qualified for the 2022 CONCACAF Champions League, where they were eliminated in the semifinals by Seattle Sounders FC.

A ceremony at New York City Hall with attendance limited to 1,000 people was held on December 14 to celebrate NYCFC's MLS Cup title. Mayor Bill de Blasio awarded keys to the city to members of the team. The traditional ticker tape parade, offered to any local sports team that wins a national title, was declined by NYCFC due to "the team's capacity". The championship banner at Yankee Stadium was raised at their 2022 home opener and was ridiculed due to its small size. The Philip F. Anschutz Trophy awarded to the club is planned to be displayed at the American Museum of Natural History in 2026 as part of an exhibition of sports championship memorabilia.

Two Portland Timbers spectators were arrested after they allegedly threw cans at NYCFC forward Jesus Medina on the field following NYCFC's goal in the 46th minute.
