= 2022 Campeones Cup =

Soccer match in New York City

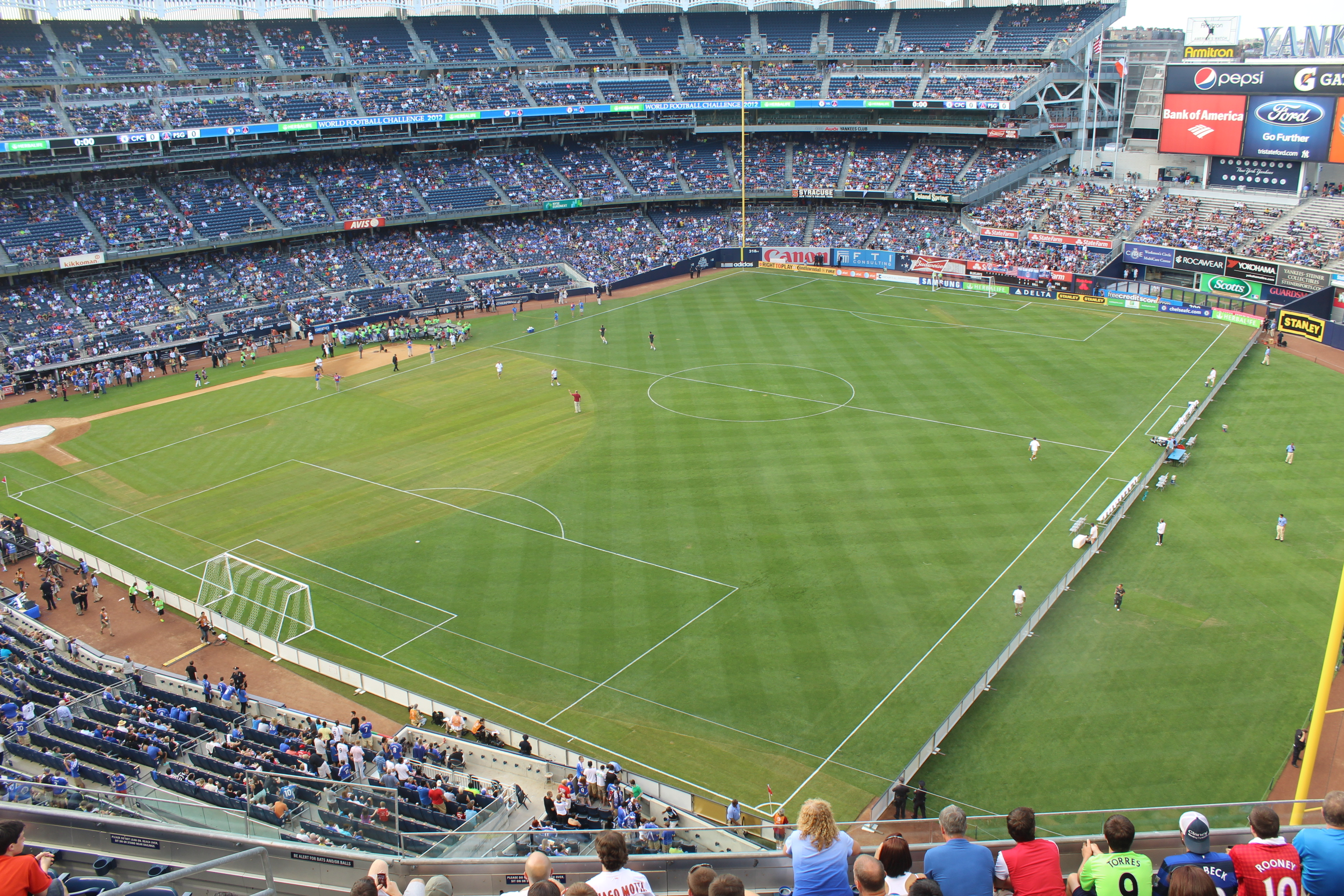
- Yankee Stadium in New York City, New York hosted the match
- Event: Campeones Cup
New York City FC	Atlas
(United States)	(Mexico)
2	0
- Date: September 14, 2022
- Venue: Yankee Stadium, New York City, New York
- Man of the Match: Luis Barraza (New York City FC)
- Referee: Saíd Martínez (Honduras)
- Attendance: 24,823

The 2022 Campeones Cup was the fourth edition of the Campeones Cup, an annual North American football match contested between the reigning champion of Major League Soccer and the winner of the Campeón de Campeones of Liga MX.

The match featured New York City FC, winners of the 2021 MLS Cup, and Atlas, the winners of the 2022 Campeón de Campeones. (Note: Although the winner of the Campeón de Campeones determined by the champions of both Apertura and Clausura tournaments, Atlas won the Campeón de Campeones title automatically by winning both the 2021 Apertura and 2022 Clausura seasons.) New York City FC hosted the match on September 14, 2022, at Yankee Stadium in New York, New York, United States. New York City won 2–0 with goals from Alexander Callens and Maximiliano Moralez while starting several reserve players. They became the third consecutive MLS team to win the Campeones Cup.

== Match ==
=== Details ===
September 14, 2022
7:30 p.m. EDT (UTC−4)

New York City FC (United States)	2–0	(Mexico) Atlas
Callens 4'; Moralez 49'	Report

Yankee Stadium, New York City, New York
Attendance: 24,823
Referee: Saíd Martínez (Honduras)
