= 2017 Minnesota United FC season =

Minnesota United FC
2017 season
- Head coach: Adrian Heath
- Stadium: TCF Bank Stadium
- Conference: 9th
- Overall: 19th
- U.S. Open Cup: Fourth Round
- Top goalscorer: Christian Ramirez (14)
- Highest home attendance: 35,043
- Lowest home attendance: 17,491
- Average home league attendance: 20,538
Home colors	Away colors

The 2017 Minnesota United FC season was the eighth season of Minnesota United FC's existence and their first season in Major League Soccer, the top-tier of American soccer. United played at TCF Bank Stadium and was coached by Adrian Heath, who coached United until October 6, 2023. Outside of MLS, Minnesota United also participated in the 2017 U.S. Open Cup, as well as various preseason competitions.

This was the first year that a first-division American soccer team had played in Minnesota since the Minnesota Strikers in 1984. Between that time, the Minnesota Thunder and the NASL Minnesota United FC played in the second division.

== Club ==
As of October 4, 2017

No.	Name	Nationality	Position	Date of birth (age)	Signed from	Start	Goals
Goalkeepers
24	Patrick McLain	(United States)	GK	22 August 1988 (age 37)	(United States) Orlando City SC	0	0
32	Alex Kapp	(United States)	GK	18 October 1994 (age 31)	(United States) Atlanta United FC	0	0
33	Bobby Shuttleworth	(United States)	GK	13 May 1987 (age 38)	(United States) New England Revolution	29	0
Defenders
2	Justin Davis	(United States)	DF	6 May 1988 (age 37)	(United States) Minnesota United FC (NASL)	5	0
3	Jérôme Thiesson	(Switzerland)	DF	6 August 1987 (age 38)	(Switzerland) FC Luzern	30	1
4	Jermaine Taylor	(Jamaica)	DF	14 January 1985 (age 41)	(United States) Portland Timbers	5	0
5	Francisco Calvo	(Costa Rica)	DF	8 July 1992 (age 33)	(Costa Rica) Saprissa	25	1
6	Vadim Demidov	(Norway)	DF	10 October 1986 (age 39)	(Norway) Brann	3	0
8	Marc Burch	(United States)	DF	7 May 1984 (age 41)	(United States) Colorado Rapids	15	0
12	Joseph Greenspan	(United States)	DF	12 September 1992 (age 33)	(United States) Colorado Rapids	2	0
14	Brent Kallman	(United States)	DF	4 October 1990 (age 35)	(United States) Minnesota United FC (NASL)	22	1
22	Kevin Venegas	(United States)	DF	29 July 1989 (age 36)	(United States) Minnesota United FC (NASL)	6	0
25	Michael Boxall	(New Zealand)	DF	18 August 1988 (age 37)	(South Africa) SuperSport United	10	0
31	Thomas de Villardi	(France)	DF/MF	27 March 1994 (age 32)	(United States) Delaware	0	0
Midfielder
7	Ibson	(Brazil)	MF	7 November 1983 (age 42)	(United States) Minnesota United FC (NASL)	26	0
10	Miguel Ibarra	(United States)	MF	15 March 1990 (age 36)	(Mexico) Club León	19	3
11	Johan Venegas	(Costa Rica)	MF	27 November 1988 (age 37)	(Canada) Montreal Impact	12	2
13	Ethan Finlay	(United States)	MF	6 August 1990 (age 35)	(United States) Columbus Crew	4	4
17	Collin Martin	(United States)	MF	9 November 1994 (age 31)	(United States) D.C. United	5	0
18	Kevin Molino	(Trinidad and Tobago)	MF	17 June 1990 (age 35)	(United States) Orlando City SC	28	7
19	Sam Cronin	(United States)	MF	12 December 1986 (age 39)	(United States) Colorado Rapids	21	0
23	Bernardo Añor	(Venezuela)	MF	28 May 1988 (age 37)	(United States) Sporting Kansas City	0	0
26	Collen Warner	(United States)	MF	24 June 1988 (age 37)	(United States) Houston Dynamo	11	1
28	Sam Nicholson	(Scotland)	MF	20 January 1995 (age 31)	(Scotland) Heart of Midlothian F.C.	7	1
77	José Leitón	(Costa Rica)	MF	6 August 1993 (age 32)	On loan from (Costa Rica) Club Sport Herediano	0	0
Forwards
9	Abu Danladi (GA)	(Ghana)	FW	18 October 1995 (age 30)	(United States) UCLA	13	8
15	Ismaila Jome	(The Gambia)	FW/MF	4 November 1994 (age 31)	(United States) Portland Timbers	7	0
16	Bashkim Kadrii	(Denmark)	FW/MF	9 July 1991 (age 34)	(Denmark) F.C. Copenhagen (loan)	5	0
21	Christian Ramirez	(United States)	FW	4 April 1991 (age 35)	(United States) Minnesota United FC (NASL)	24	14
30	Brandon Allen	(United States)	FW	8 October 1993 (age 32)	On loan from (United States) New York Red Bulls	0	0

== Transfers ==
=== Transfers in ===
Entry date	Position(s)	No.	Player	From club	Ref.
December 1, 2016	DF	2	(United States) Justin Davis	(United States) Minnesota United FC (NASL)	
December 1, 2016	DF	22	(United States) Kevin Venegas	(United States) Minnesota United FC (NASL)	
December 11, 2016	DF	12	(United States) Joseph Greenspan	(United States) Colorado Rapids	
December 13, 2016	MF	11	(Costa Rica) Johan Venegas	(Canada) Montreal Impact	
December 27, 2016	MF	5	(Costa Rica) Francisco Calvo	(Costa Rica) Saprissa	
January 3, 2017	MF	17	(United States) Collin Martin	(United States) D.C. United	
January 5, 2017	MF	10	(United States) Miguel Ibarra	(Mexico) Club León	
January 5, 2017	FW	21	(United States) Christian Ramirez	(United States) Minnesota United FC (NASL)	
January 10, 2017	DF	6	(Norway) Vadim Demidov	(Norway) Brann	
January 23, 2017	DF	14	(United States) Brent Kallman	(United States) Minnesota United FC (NASL)	
January 23, 2017	MF	7	(Brazil) Ibson	(United States) Minnesota United FC (NASL)	
January 24, 2017	MF	23	(Venezuela) Bernardo Añor	(United States) Sporting Kansas City	
January 24, 2017	DF	4	(Jamaica) Jermaine Taylor	(United States) Portland Timbers	
January 24, 2017	MF	20	(Finland) Rasmus Schüller	(Sweden) BK Häcken	
January 26, 2017	MF	18	(Trinidad and Tobago) Kevin Molino	(United States) Orlando City SC	
January 26, 2017	GK	24	(United States) Patrick McLain	(United States) Orlando City SC	
February 15, 2017	FW/MF	45	(United States) Josh Gatt	(Norway) Molde	
February 15, 2017	GK	22	(United States) Bobby Shuttleworth	(United States) New England Revolution	
February 21, 2017	DF	3	(Switzerland) Jérôme Thiesson	(Switzerland) FC Luzern	
March 31, 2017	DF	8	(United States) Marc Burch	(United States) Colorado Rapids	
March 31, 2017	MF	19	(United States) Sam Cronin	(United States) Colorado Rapids	
July 10, 2017	MF	28	(Scotland) Sam Nicholson	(Scotland) Heart of Midlothian F.C.	
July 12, 2017	DF	25	(New Zealand) Michael Boxall	(South Africa) SuperSport United	
August 8, 2017	GK	32	(United States) Alex Kapp	(United States) Atlanta United FC	
August 9, 2017	MF	13	(United States) Ethan Finlay	(United States) Columbus Crew	

=== MLS Expansion Draft ===
Pick	Player	Position	Previous club	Ref
2	(United States) Chris Duvall	DF	(United States) New York Red Bulls	
4	(United States) Collen Warner	MF	(United States) Houston Dynamo	
6	(Sweden) Mohammed Saeid	MF	(United States) Columbus Crew	
8	(United States) Jeff Attinella	GK	(United States) Real Salt Lake	
10	(Benin) Femi Hollinger-Janzen	FW	(United States) New England Revolution	

The MLS Expansion Draft took place on December 13, 2016.

=== MLS SuperDraft ===
Any player marked with a * is part of the Generation Adidas program.

Round	Pick	Player	Position	Previous club	Ref
1	1	(Ghana) Abu Danladi*	FW	(United States) UCLA	
2	23	(United States) Alec Ferrell	GK	(United States) Wake Forest	
2	42	(France) Thomas de Villardi	MF	(United States) Delaware	
4	67	(United States) Tanner Thompson	MF	(United States) Indiana	

1. Acquired from the Colorado Rapids via the Philadelphia Union for $50,000 in 2018 General Allocation Money and the 3rd pick (25th overall) selection in the 2017 MLS SuperDraft (which was acquired from Chicago Fire along with general allocation money and the #3 ranking in the MLS Allocation Order for the #2 place in the MLS Allocation Order)

Rounds 1 and 2 of the SuperDraft took place on January 13, 2017.
Rounds 3 and 4 of the SuperDraft took place on January 17, 2017.

=== Transfers out ===
Exit date	Position	No.	Player	To club	Notes	Ref.
December 13, 2016	DF	—	(United States) Chris Duvall	(Canada) Montreal Impact	Traded for Johan Venegas	
December 20, 2016	GK	—	(United States) Jeff Attinella	(United States) Portland Timbers	Traded for Portland's second round pick in the 2018 MLS SuperDraft	
February 15, 2017	FW	88	(Benin) Femi Hollinger-Janzen	(United States) New England Revolution	Traded for Bobby Shuttleworth	
March 31, 2017	FW	45	(United States) Joshua Gatt	(United States) Colorado Rapids	Traded for Sam Cronin & Marc Burch	
March 31, 2017	MF	8	(Sweden) Mohammed Saeid	(United States) Colorado Rapids	Traded for Sam Cronin & Marc Burch	

=== Loans in ===
Start date	End date	Position	No.	Player	From club	Ref.
January 25, 2017	July 23, 2017	GK	1	(Sweden) John Alvbåge	(Sweden) IFK Göteborg	
February 8, 2017	September 1, 2017	FW/MF	16	(Denmark) Bashkim Kadrii	(Denmark) F.C. Copenhagen	
July 15, 2017	End of season	FW	30	(United States) Brandon Allen	(United States) New York Red Bulls	
August 10, 2017	July 10, 2018	MF	77	(Costa Rica) José Leitón	(Costa Rica) Club Sport Herediano	

=== Loans out ===
Start date	End date	Position	No.	Player	Loaned to	Ref.
August 9, 2017	December 31, 2017	MF	20	(Finland) Rasmus Schüller	(Finland) Helsingin Jalkapalloklubi	
September 28, 2017	October 1, 2017	DF	12	(United States) Joseph Greenspan	(United States) Pittsburgh Riverhounds	
October 14, 2017	October 15, 2017	DF	12	(United States) Joseph Greenspan	(United States) Pittsburgh Riverhounds	

== Friendlies ==
Win Loss Draw

January 31, 2017	New England Revolution	1–1	Minnesota United FC	Casa Grande, Arizona
12:30 p.m. CST	Kamara 78'	Report	Starikov 39'	Stadium: Kino Sports Complex

February 3, 2017	Minnesota United FC (United States)	1–1	(Croatia) NK Istra 1961	Casa Grande, Arizona
1:00 p.m. CST	Starikov 80'		Roce 64'	Stadium: Kino Sports Complex

February 19, 2017	Minnesota United FC	3–1	Wisconsin Badgers
CST	Ramirez, pen.' Greenspan	Report	T. Barlow	Attendance: Closed door

February 22, 2017	Toronto FC	3–0	Minnesota United FC	Orlando, Florida
2:00 p.m. CST	Giovinco 17', 23'; Hamilton 53'

February 26, 2017	Minnesota United FC	0–2	San Antonio FC (USL)	Orlando, Florida
TBD			Hedrick 39'; Vega 90'

July 15, 2017	(United States) Minnesota United FC	1–1	(Mexico) Club Atlas	Minneapolis, Minnesota
7:30 p.m. CST	Bashkim Kadrii 25'	Report	Milton Caraglio 40'	Stadium: TCF Bank Stadium; Attendance: 17,010

=== Timbers preseason tournament ===
Pos	Team	GP	W	L	D	GF	GA	GD	Pts
1	(United States) Portland Timbers	3	1	0	2	7	6	+1	5
2	(United States) Real Salt Lake	3	0	0	3	7	7	0	3
3	(United States) Minnesota United FC	3	0	0	3	6	6	0	3
4	(Canada) Vancouver Whitecaps FC	3	0	1	2	3	4	−1	2

February 9, 2017 1	Minnesota United FC	1–1	Vancouver Whitecaps FC	Portland, Oregon
7:00 p.m. CST	Molino 50'; Venegas (yellow card) 86'; Gonzalez (yellow card) 88'	Report	Jacobson (yellow card) 24'; Teibert 82', (yellow card) 86'	Stadium: Providence Park

February 12, 2017 2	Portland Timbers	2–2	Minnesota United FC	Portland, Oregon
7:00 p.m. CST	McInerney 51'; Adi 85'	Report	Greenspan (yellow card) 9'; Venegas 25', 32'	Stadium: Providence Park

February 15, 2017 3	Real Salt Lake	3–3	Minnesota United FC	Portland, Oregon
7:00 p.m. CST	Schuler (yellow card) 10'; Movsisyan 57'; Barrett 79'; Brody 88'; Hernández (yellow card) 90+'	Report	Molino 24', 48'; Schuller (yellow card) 81'; Venegas 90+'	Stadium: Providence Park

== Competitions ==
=== Overview ===
Competition	Record							
Competition	G	W	D	L	GF	GA	GD	Win %
MLS	34	10	6	18	47	70	−23	29.41
MLS Cup	0	0	0	0	0	0	+0	—
U.S. Open Cup	1	0	0	1	0	4	−4	0.00
Total	35	10	6	19	47	74	−27	28.57

Updated to match played October 22, 2017.
Source: Competitions

=== MLS ===
Pos	Team	Pld	W	L	T	GF	GA	GD	Pts	Qualification
1	Portland Timbers	34	15	11	8	60	50	+10	53	MLS Cup Conference Semifinals
2	Seattle Sounders FC	34	14	9	11	52	39	+13	53	MLS Cup Conference Semifinals
3	Vancouver Whitecaps FC	34	15	12	7	50	49	+1	52	MLS Cup Knockout Round
4	Houston Dynamo	34	13	10	11	57	45	+12	50	MLS Cup Knockout Round
5	Sporting Kansas City	34	12	9	13	40	29	+11	49	MLS Cup Knockout Round
6	San Jose Earthquakes	34	13	14	7	39	60	−21	46	MLS Cup Knockout Round
7	FC Dallas	34	11	10	13	48	48	0	46	
8	Real Salt Lake	34	13	15	6	48	56	−8	45	
9	Minnesota United FC	34	10	18	6	47	70	−23	36	
10	Colorado Rapids	34	9	19	6	31	51	−20	33	
11	LA Galaxy	34	8	18	8	45	67	−22	32	

Source: MLS

==== Overall table ====
Pos	Team	Pld	W	L	T	GF	GA	GD	Pts	Qualification
1	Toronto FC (C, S)	34	20	5	9	74	37	+37	69	CONCACAF Champions League
2	New York City FC	34	16	9	9	56	43	+13	57	
3	Chicago Fire	34	16	11	7	61	47	+14	55	
4	Atlanta United FC	34	15	9	10	70	40	+30	55	
5	Columbus Crew	34	16	12	6	53	49	+4	54	
6	Portland Timbers	34	15	11	8	60	50	+10	53	
7	Seattle Sounders FC	34	14	9	11	52	39	+13	53	
8	Vancouver Whitecaps FC	34	15	12	7	50	49	+1	52	
9	New York Red Bulls	34	14	12	8	53	47	+6	50	
10	Houston Dynamo	34	13	10	11	57	45	+12	50	
11	Sporting Kansas City	34	12	9	13	40	29	+11	49	CONCACAF Champions League
12	San Jose Earthquakes	34	13	14	7	39	60	−21	46	
13	FC Dallas	34	11	10	13	48	48	0	46	
14	Real Salt Lake	34	13	15	6	49	55	−6	45	
15	New England Revolution	34	13	15	6	53	61	−8	45	
16	Philadelphia Union	34	11	14	9	50	47	+3	42	
17	Montreal Impact	34	11	17	6	52	58	−6	39	
18	Orlando City SC	34	10	15	9	39	58	−19	39	
19	Minnesota United FC	34	10	18	6	47	70	−23	36	
20	Colorado Rapids	34	9	19	6	31	51	−20	33	
21	D.C. United	34	9	20	5	31	60	−29	32	
22	LA Galaxy	34	8	18	8	45	67	−22	32	

Source: MLS
Rules for classification: 1) points; 2) total wins; 3) total goal differential; 4) total goals scored; 5) disciplinary points; 6) away goals scored; 7) away goal differential; 8) coin toss or drawing of lots
(C) MLS Cup Champion; (S) Supporters' Shield

==== Results summary ====
Overall								Home						Away					
Pld	W	D	L	GF	GA	GD	Pts	W	D	L	GF	GA	GD	W	D	L	GF	GA	GD
34	10	6	18	47	70	−23	36	7	4	6	25	26	−1	3	2	12	22	44	−22

Source: Match reports

==== Results by round ====
Round	1	2	3	4	5	6	7	8	9	10	11	12	13	14	15	16	17	18	19	20	21	22	23	24	25	26	27	28	29	30	31	32	33	34
Stadium	A	H	A	A	H	A	A	H	H	H	A	H	H	A	A	H	H	A	H	H	H	H	H	A	A	H	A	A	H	A	A	H	A	A
Result	L	L	D	L	W	L	D	W	L	W	L	L	W	L	L	W	D	L	L	D	L	W	L	L	W	D	L	W	W	L	W	D	L	L

Source: Match reports
A = Away; H = Home; W = Win; D = Draw; L = Loss

==== Matches ====
Win Loss Draw

March 3, 2017 Match 1	Portland Timbers	5–1	Minnesota United FC	Portland, Oregon
8:30 p.m. CST	Olum 14'; Valeri 47', 82' (pen.); Adi 90+1', 90+3'	Report	Ramirez 79'	Stadium: Providence Park; Attendance: 21,144; Referee: Chris Penso

March 12, 2017 Match 2	Minnesota United FC	1–6	Atlanta United FC	Minneapolis, Minnesota
4:00 p.m. CDT	Schüller (yellow card) 19'; Molino 30' (pen.) (yellow card) 57'; Calvo (yellow card) 41'	Report	Martínez 3', 27', 75'; Almirón 13', 52'; Pírez (yellow card) 34'; Villalba (yellow card) 48'; Peterson 90+4'	Stadium: TCF Bank Stadium; Attendance: 35,043; Referee: Ismail Elfath

March 18, 2017 Match 3	Colorado Rapids	2–2	Minnesota United FC	Commerce City, Colorado
8:00 p.m. CDT	Baddi 17'; Cronin (yellow card) 56'; Hairston 59'; Williams (yellow card) 89'	Report	Warner (yellow card) 41'; Molino 50' (pen.); Ramirez 58'; Thiesson (yellow card) 64'; Davis (red card) 70'; Shuttleworth (yellow card) 90+4'; Danladi (yellow card) 90+5'	Stadium: Dick's Sporting Goods Park; Attendance: 14,013; Referee: Nima Saghafi

March 25, 2017 Match 4	New England Revolution	5–2	Minnesota United FC	Foxborough, Massachusetts
1:00 p.m. CDT	Agudelo 4', 41'; Kamara 21'; Nguyen 32' (pen.); Tierney 53' (pen.)	Report	Warner 15'; Kallman 49'	Stadium: Gillette Stadium; Attendance: 11,571; Referee: Ricardo Salazar

April 1, 2017 Match 5	Minnesota United FC	4–2	Real Salt Lake	Minneapolis, Minnesota
7:00 p.m. CDT	Molino 16'; Ramirez 52', 62'; Venegas 68'	Report	Mulholland 4'; Movsisyan 87'	Stadium: TCF Bank Stadium; Attendance: 17,728; Referee: Armando Villarreal

April 8, 2017 Match 6	FC Dallas	2–0	Minnesota United FC	Frisco, Texas
7:00 p.m. CDT	Gruezo (yellow card) 30'; Morales 43'; Barrios 49'; González (yellow card) 88'; Grana (yellow card) 89'	Report	Warner (yellow card) 5'; Ibson (yellow card) 61'; Kallman (yellow card) 72'	Stadium: Toyota Stadium; Referee: Chris Penso

April 15, 2017 Match 7	Houston Dynamo	2–2	Minnesota United FC	Houston, Texas
7:00 p.m. CDT	Manotas 14'; Elis 43'	Report	Ramirez 47'; Venegas 59'	Stadium: BBVA Compass Stadium; Attendance: 16,125; Referee: Robert Sibiga

April 23, 2017 Match 8	Minnesota United FC	1–0	Colorado Rapids	Minneapolis, Minnesota
5:00 p.m. CDT	Ibarra 72'	Report		Stadium: TCF Bank Stadium; Attendance: 17,491; Referee: Fotis Bazakos

April 29, 2017 Match 9	Minnesota United FC	0–1	San Jose Earthquakes	Minneapolis, Minnesota
7:00 p.m. CDT	Thiesson (yellow card) 90+3'	Report	Jungwirth 54'; Bingham (yellow card) 87'	Stadium: TCF Bank Stadium; Attendance: 17,605; Referee: Ted Unkel

May 7, 2017 Match 10	Minnesota United FC	2–0	Sporting Kansas City	Minneapolis, Minnesota
12:30 p.m. CDT	Danladi 22'; Ramirez 39' (yellow card) 51'; Calvo (yellow card) 72'	Report	Julião (yellow card) 17'; Dwyer (yellow card) 72'	Stadium: TCF Bank Stadium; Attendance: 17,709; Referee: Alan Kelly

May 13, 2017 Match 11	Toronto FC	3–2	Minnesota United FC	Toronto, Ontario
CDT	Giovinco 21' (pen.); Ramirez 54' (o.g.); Ricketts 77'; Altidore (yellow card) 90+3'	Report	Molino 52' 62'	Stadium: BMO Field; Attendance: 27,249; Referee: Allen Chapman

May 21, 2017 Match 12	Minnesota United FC	1–2	LA Galaxy	Minneapolis, Minnesota
4:00 p.m. CDT	Ramirez 66'; Ibarra (yellow card) 74'	Report	G.dos Santos 38' (yellow card) 90+3'; Van Damme (yellow card) 45+2'; Steres (yellow card) 73'; Alessandrini (yellow card) 79'; Ramirez 84' (o.g.)	Stadium: TCF Bank Stadium; Attendance: 19,107; Referee: Chris Penso

May 27, 2017 Match 13	Minnesota United FC	1–0	Orlando City SC	Minneapolis, Minnesota
7:00 p.m. CDT	Venegas (yellow card) 38'; Ramirez 56'; Cronin (yellow card) 66'; Jome (yellow card) 76'; Burch (yellow card) 81'; Ibarra (yellow card) 90+1'	Report		Stadium: TCF Bank Stadium; Attendance: 18,896; Referee: Nima Saghafi

June 3, 2017 Match 14	Sporting Kansas City	3–0	Minnesota United FC	Kansas City, Kansas
16:00 CDT	Feilhaber (yellow card) 12'; Melia (yellow card) 44'; Opara 45+2'; Medranda 54'; Abdul-Salaam 87'	Report	Jome (yellow card) 7'; Warner (yellow card) 23'; Shuttleworth (yellow card) 43'	Stadium: Children's Mercy Park; Attendance: 20,361; Referee: Jorge González

June 17, 2017 Match 15	Real Salt Lake	1–0	Minnesota United FC	Sandy, Utah
9:00 p.m. CDT	Beckerman (yellow card) 75'; Movsisyan 85'	Report	Kallman (yellow card) 21'; Ibson (yellow card) 86'	Stadium: Rio Tinto Stadium; Attendance: 19,256; Referee: Marco de Oliveira

June 21, 2017 Match 16	Minnesota United FC	3–2	Portland Timbers	Minneapolis, Minnesota
7:00 p.m. CDT	Okugo 7' (o.g.); Ramirez 47'; Danladi 64' (red card) 70'	Report	Valeri 37' (pen.); Calvo 50' (o.g.); Blanco (red card) 71'; Miller (yellow card) 85'	Stadium: TCF Bank Stadium; Attendance: 18,442; Referee: Ted Unkel

June 24, 2017 Match 17	Minnesota United FC	2–2	Whitecaps FC	Minneapolis, Minnesota
7:00 p.m. CDT	Shuttleworth (yellow card) 16'; Kallman (yellow card) 45+1'; Calvo 50'; Thiesson (yellow card) 54' (goal) 63'; Ibson (yellow card) 59'	Report	Techera 17' (pen.) (yellow card) 65'; Tchani (yellow card) 26' (goal) 45+2'	Stadium: TCF Bank Stadium; Attendance: 19,016; Referee: Jose Carlos Rivero

June 29, 2017 Match 18	New York City FC	3–1	Minnesota United FC	New York City, New York
6:30 p.m. CDT	Callens 38'; Villa (yellow card) 45+4' (goal) 63'; Harrison 52'; Wallace (yellow card) 68'	Report	Ramirez 9'; Molino (yellow card) 23'; Venegas (yellow card) 45+4'	Stadium: Yankee Stadium; Attendance: 21,572; Referee: Armando Villarreal

July 4, 2017 Match 19	Minnesota United FC	0–1	Columbus Crew SC	Minneapolis, Minnesota
6:00 p.m. CDT	Ibson (yellow card) 9'	Report	Manneh 58'; Steffen (yellow card) 90+1'	Stadium: TCF Bank Stadium; Attendance: 18,564; Referee: Rubiel Vazquez

July 19, 2017 Match 20	Minnesota United FC	0–0	Houston Dynamo	Minneapolis, Minnesota
7:00 p.m. CDT	Jome (yellow card) 36'; Kallman (yellow card) 90+2'; Martin (yellow card) 90+6'	Report	Clark (yellow card) 45'; Machado (yellow card) 63'	Stadium: TCF Bank Stadium; Attendance: 19,456; Referee: Silviu Petrescu

July 22, 2017 Match 21	Minnesota United FC	0–3	New York Red Bulls	Minneapolis, Minnesota
3:00 p.m. CDT	Kallman (yellow card) 53'; Ibson (yellow card) 90'	Report	Royer 16'; Adams (yellow card) 16'; Wright-Phillips 67'; Muyl 90'	Stadium: TCF Bank Stadium; Attendance: 20,022; Referee: Hilario Grajeda

July 29, 2017 Match 22	Minnesota United FC	4–0	D.C. United	Minneapolis, Minnesota
7:00 p.m. CDT	Ramirez 7'; Danladi 40'; Jeffrey 54' (o.g.); Shuttleworth (yellow card) 79'; Cronin (yellow card) 86'; Ibarra 90+1'	Report	Kemp (yellow card) 36'	Stadium: TCF Bank Stadium; Attendance: 20,146; Referee: Robert Sibiga

August 5, 2017 Match 23	Minnesota United FC	0–4	Seattle Sounders FC	Minneapolis, Minnesota
7:00 p.m. CDT	Cronin (yellow card) 84'		Bruin 9'; Dempsey 18', 73'; Morris 71'	Stadium: TCF Bank Stadium; Attendance: 22,649; Referee: José Carlos Rivero

August 20, 2017 Match 24	Seattle Sounders FC	2–1	Minnesota United FC	Seattle, Washington
9:00 p.m. CDT	Marshall 31'; Dempsey 90'+4' (pen.)	Report	Finlay 21'; Danladi (yellow card) 25'; Taylor (yellow card) 90'+3'	Stadium: CenturyLink Field; Attendance: 40,312; Referee: Ismail Elfath

August 26, 2017 Match 25	Chicago Fire	1–2	Minnesota United FC	Bridgeview, Illinois
7:30 p.m. CDT	Dax McCarty (yellow card) 69'; David Accam 77'; Bastian Schweinsteiger (yellow card) 84'	Report	Danladi 36' (45) (yellow card) 78'	Stadium: Toyota Park; Attendance: 18408; Referee: Kevin Stott

September 9, 2017 Match 26	Minnesota United FC	1–1	Philadelphia Union	Minneapolis, Minnesota
7:00 p.m. CDT	Finlay 40'	Report	Sapong 6'; Wijnaldum (yellow card) 38'; Onyewu (yellow card) 55'; Ilsinho (yellow card) 60'	Stadium: TCF Bank Stadium; Attendance: 22,148; Referee: Sorin Stoica

September 13, 2017 Match 27	Vancouver Whitecaps FC	3–0	Minnesota United FC	Vancouver, British Columbia
CDT	Reyna 5'; Hurtado 31'; Shea 88'	Report	Boxall (yellow card) 45'; Warner (yellow card) 52'	Stadium: BC Place; Attendance: 17,368; Referee: David Gantar

September 16, 2017 Match 28	Montreal Impact	2–3	Minnesota United FC	Montreal, Quebec
CDT	Bernier 9'; Džemaili (yellow card) 53' (goal) 55'; Piette (yellow card) 62'; Cabrera (yellow card) 90+3'	Report	Martin (yellow card) 2'; Molino 20' (pen.); Ramirez 60'; Danladi 89'	Stadium: Saputo Stadium; Attendance: 20,801; Referee: Ted Unkel

September 23, 2017 Match 29	Minnesota United FC	4–1	FC Dallas	Minneapolis, Minnesota
7:00 p.m. CDT	Ramirez 24'; Ibarra 35'; Calvo (yellow card) 40'; Finlay (yellow card) 42' (goal) 71'; Collin Martin (yellow card) 58'; Molino 88'	Report	Akindele 14' (red card) 81'; Barrios (yellow card) 75'; Grana (yellow card) 78'	Stadium: TCF Bank Stadium; Attendance: 22,055; Referee: Alex Chilowicz

September 30, 2017 Match 30	Houston Dynamo	2–1	Minnesota United FC	Houston, Texas
7:30 p.m. CDT	Alberth Elis 69', (yellow card) 70'; Romell Quioto 85', (yellow card) 85'	Report	Michael Boxall (yellow card) 68'; Francisco Calvo (yellow card) 87'; Sam Nicholson 90+1'	Stadium: BBVA Compass Stadium; Attendance: 16,133; Referee: Ismail Elfath

October 3, 2017 Match 31	Atlanta United FC	2–3	Minnesota United FC	Atlanta, Georgia
5:00 p.m. CDT	Tyrone Mears (yellow card) 38'; Kyle Reynish (yellow card) 60'; Villalba 67'; Gressel 72'; Asad (yellow card) 79'	Report	Martin (yellow card) 30'; Danladi 48'; Kallman (yellow card) 80'; Ramirez 90'; Molino 90+6', (yellow card) 90+7'	Stadium: Mercedes-Benz Stadium; Attendance: 43,185; Referee: Armando Villarreal

October 7, 2017 Match 32	Minnesota United FC	1–1	Sporting Kansas City	Minneapolis, Minnesota
7:00 p.m. CDT	Thiesson (yellow card) 41'; Kallman 84'; Joseph Greenspan (yellow card) 86' (yellow-red card) 90+1'	Report	Diego Rubio 42'; Sinovic (yellow card) 70'; Dykstra (yellow card) 72'	Stadium: TCF Bank Stadium; Attendance: 23,060; Referee: José Carlos Rivero

October 15, 2017 Match 33	LA Galaxy	3–0	Minnesota United FC	Carson, California
4:00 p.m. CDT	Alessandrini 11', 90+3'; Jonathan 22'; Ciani (yellow card) 83'	Report	Thiesson (yellow card) 44'; Warner (yellow card) 77'	Stadium: StubHub Center; Attendance: 23,377; Referee: Alex Chilowicz

October 22, 2017 Match 34	San Jose Earthquakes	3–2	Minnesota United FC	San Jose, California
3:00 p.m. CDT	Hoesen 15'; Wondolowski 55'; Godoy (yellow card) 68'; Ureña 90+3'	Report	Ibson (yellow card) 23'; Thiesson 36'; Warner (yellow card) 40'; Danladi (yellow card) 76'; Calvo 81'	Stadium: Avaya Stadium; Attendance: 18,000; Referee: Hilario Grajeda

=== U.S. Open Cup ===
June 14 Fourth round	Sporting Kansas City	4–0	Minnesota United FC	Kansas City, Kansas
7:30 PM CDT	Opara 43'; Fernandes 45+1'; Dwyer 72'; Sallói 83'	Report		Stadium: Children's Mercy Park; Attendance: 15,260; Referee: Juan Guzman (Nevada)

== Player statistics ==
=== Top scorers ===
Rank	Position	Name	MLS	MLS Cup	U.S. Open Cup	Total
1	FW	(United States) Christian Ramirez	14	0	0	14
2	FW	(Ghana) Abu Danladi	8	0	0	8
3	MF	(Trinidad and Tobago) Kevin Molino	7	0	0	7
3	MF	(United States) Ethan Finlay	4	0	0	4
4	MF	(United States) Miguel Ibarra	3	0	0	3
5	FW	(Costa Rica) Johan Venegas	2	0	0	2
5	DF	(United States) Brent Kallman	2	0	0	2
5	MF	(Switzerland) Jérôme Thiesson	2	0	0	2
5	MF	(Costa Rica) Francisco Calvo	2	0	0	2
6	MF	(United States) Collen Warner	1	0	0	1
6	MF	(Scotland) Sam Nicholson	1	0	0	1
6	N/A	Own Goal	1	0	0	1
Total			47	0	0	47

As of October 22, 2017.

=== Shutouts ===
Rank	Player	MLS	MLS Cup	U.S. Open Cup	Total
1	(United States) Bobby Shuttleworth	5	0	0	5
2	(Sweden) John Alvbåge	0	0	0	0
2	(United States) Patrick McLain	0	0	0	0
Total		5	0	0	5

=== Appearances ===
No.	Pos.	Name	MLS			MLS Cup			U.S. Open Cup			Total		
No.	Pos.	Name	Apps	Goals	Assists	Apps	Goals	Assists	Apps	Goals	Assists	Apps	Goals	Assists
2	DF	(United States) Justin Davis	3 (2)	0	0	0	0	0	1	0	0	4 (2)	0	0
3	DF	(Switzerland) Jérôme Thiesson	13	0	1	0	0	0	(1)	0	0	13 (1)	0	1
4	DF	(Jamaica) Jermaine Taylor	3 (4)	0	0	0	0	0	0	0	0	3 (4)	0	0
5	DF	(Costa Rica) Francisco Calvo	12	0	0	0	0	0	0	0	0	12	0	0
6	DF	(Norway) Vadim Demidov	3	0	0	0	0	0	0	0	0	3	0	0
7	MF	(Brazil) Ibson	9 (2)	0	0	0	0	0	(1)	0	0	9 (3)	0	0
8	DF	(United States) Marc Burch	12	0	1	0	0	0	(1)	0	0	12 (1)	0	1
9	FW	(Ghana) Abu Danladi	3 (7)	1	1	0	0	0	1	0	0	4 (7)	1	1
10	MF	(United States) Miguel Ibarra	9 (3)	1	2	0	0	0	0	0	0	9 (3)	1	2
11	MF	(Costa Rica) Johan Venegas	9 (3)	2	3	0	0	0	0	0	0	9 (3)	2	3
12	DF	(United States) Joseph Greenspan	0	0	0	0	0	0	1	0	0	1	0	0
13	DF	(France) Thomas de Villardi	0	0	0	0	0	0	0	0	0	0	0	0
14	DF	(United States) Brent Kallman	12	1	0	0	0	0	0	0	0	12	1	0
15	FW	(The Gambia) Ismaila Jome	2 (3)	0	0	0	0	0	1	0	0	3 (3)	0	0
16	FW	(Denmark) Bashkim Kadrii	4 (4)	0	0	0	0	0	1	0	0	5 (4)	0	0
17	MF	(United States) Collin Martin	0 (2)	0	0	0	0	0	1	0	0	1 (2)	0	0
18	MF	(Trinidad and Tobago) Kevin Molino	12	5	3	0	0	0	0	0	0	12	5	3
19	MF	(United States) Sam Cronin	11	0	1	0	0	0	0	0	0	11	0	1
20	MF	(Finland) Rasmus Schüller	4 (2)	0	0	0	0	0	1	0	0	5 (2)	0	0
21	FW	(United States) Christian Ramirez	13 (1)	8	1	0	0	0	0	0	0	13 (1)	8	1
22	DF	(United States) Kevin Venegas	1	0	0	0	0	0	1	0	0	2	0	0
23	MF	(Venezuela) Bernardo Añor	0	0	0	0	0	0	0	0	0	0	0	0
24	GK	(United States) Patrick McLain	0	0	0	0	0	0	1	0	0	1	0	0
26	MF	(United States) Collen Warner	8 (3)	1	0	0	0	0	1	0	0	9 (3)	1	0
33	GK	(United States) Bobby Shuttleworth	12 (1)	0	0	0	0	0	0	0	0	12 (1)	0	0
Players who left the club in Trade or on loan
1	GK	(Sweden) John Alvbåge	2 (1)	0	0	0	0	0	0	0	0	2 (1)	0	0
8	MF	(Sweden) Mohammed Saeid	3	0	0	0	0	0	0	0	0	3	0	0
45	FW	(United States) Joshua Gatt	0	0	0	0	0	0	0	0	0	0	0	0

As of June 5, 2017.

=== Discipline ===
Place	Position	No.	Name	Yellow card	Red card
1	DF	2	(United States) Justin Davis	0	1
1	FW	9	(Ghana) Abu Danladi	3	1
2	DF	14	(United States) Brent Kallman	7	0
3	MF	7	(Brazil) Ibson	5	0
3	MF	19	(United States) Sam Cronin	5	0
3	DF	5	(Costa Rica) Francisco Calvo	5	0
3	MF	18	(Trinidad and Tobago) Kevin Molino	5	0
4	DF	3	(Switzerland) Jérôme Thiesson	4	0
4	MF	11	(Costa Rica) Johan Venegas	4	0
4	DF	17	(United States) Collin Martin	4	0
4	GK	33	(United States) Bobby Shuttleworth	4	0
4	MF	26	(United States) Collen Warner	4	0
5	MF	15	(The Gambia) Ismaila Jome	3	0
5	MF	10	(United States) Miguel Ibarra	3	0
6	FW	4	(Jamaica) Jermaine Taylor	1	0
6	DF	8	(United States) Marc Burch	1	0
6	MF	20	(Finland) Rasmus Schüller	1	0
6	FW	21	(United States) Christian Ramirez	1	0
6	FW	25	(United States) Michael Boxall	1	0
Total				52	2

As of October 4, 2017.

=== Attendance ===
Total	Games	Average	Season highest
349,138	17	20,538	Atlanta United FC (35,043)

As of October 7, 2017
