= 2019 Minnesota United FC season =

Minnesota United FC
2019 season
- Owner: Bill McGuire
- CEO: Chris Wright
- Head coach: Adrian Heath
- Stadium: Allianz Field
- Western Conference: 4th
- Overall: 7th
- MLS Cup Playoffs: First Round
- U.S. Open Cup: Runner-up
- Top goalscorer: Darwin Quintero (9)
- Highest home attendance: 19,906
- Lowest home attendance: 19,600
- Average home league attendance: 19,740
- Biggest win: 7–1 (June 29 vs. CIN)
- Biggest defeat: 0–3 (May 29 at ATL)
Home colors	Away colors

The 2019 Minnesota United FC season was the tenth season of Minnesota United FC's existence and their third season in Major League Soccer, the top-tier of American soccer. It was the first season that United played at Allianz Field, their new home stadium. They were coached by Adrian Heath. Outside of MLS, Minnesota United also participated in the 2019 U.S. Open Cup, as well as various preseason competitions.

== Club ==
No.	Name	Nationality	Position	Date of birth (age)	Signed from
Goalkeepers
1	Vito Mannone	(Italy)	GK	2 March 1988 (age 38)	(England) Reading
97	Dayne St. Clair (GA)	(Canada)	GK	9 May 1997 (age 29)	(United States) Maryland
Defenders
2	Carter Manley	(United States)	DF	29 April 1996 (age 30)	(United States) Duke
3	Ike Opara	(United States)	DF	21 February 1989 (age 37)	(United States) Sporting Kansas City
14	Brent Kallman	(United States)	DF	4 October 1990 (age 35)	(United States) Minnesota United FC (NASL)
15	Michael Boxall	(New Zealand)	DF	18 August 1988 (age 38)	(South Africa) SuperSport United
19	Romain Métanire	(Madagascar)	DF	28 March 1990 (age 36)	(France) Stade Reims
22	Wyatt Omsberg	(United States)	DF	21 September 1995 (age 30)	(United States) Dartmouth
77	Chase Gasper	(United States)	DF	25 January 1996 (age 30)	(United States) Maryland
86	Wilfried Moimbé	(France)	DF	18 October 1988 (age 37)	(France) AS Nancy
Midfielder
6	Osvaldo Alonso	(Cuba)	MF	11 November 1985 (age 40)	(United States) Seattle Sounders FC
7	Kevin Molino	(Trinidad and Tobago)	MF	17 June 1990 (age 36)	(United States) Orlando City SC
8	Ján Greguš (DP)	(Slovakia)	MF	29 January 1991 (age 35)	(Denmark) F.C. Copenhagen
10	Miguel Ibarra	(United States)	MF	15 March 1990 (age 36)	(Mexico) Club León
11	Thomás Chacón (DP)	(Uruguay)	MF	17 August 2000 (age 26)	(Uruguay) Danubio FC
12	Lawrence Olum	(Kenya)	MF	10 July 1984 (age 42)	(United States) Portland Timbers
13	Ethan Finlay	(United States)	MF	6 August 1990 (age 36)	(United States) Columbus Crew
16	Robin Lod	(Finland)	MF	6 August 1997 (age 29)	(Spain) Sporting Gijón
17	Collin Martin	(United States)	MF	9 November 1994 (age 31)	(United States) D.C. United
20	Rasmus Schüller	(Finland)	MF	18 June 1991 (age 35)	(Sweden) BK Häcken
25	Darwin Quintero (DP)	(Colombia)	MF	19 September 1987 (age 38)	(Mexico) Club America
31	Hassani Dotson	(United States)	MF	6 August 1997 (age 29)	(United States) Oregon State
Forwards
9	Ángelo Rodríguez	(Colombia)	FW	4 April 1989 (age 37)	(Colombia) Deportes Tolima
23	Mason Toye (GA)	(United States)	FW	16 October 1998 (age 27)	(United States) Indiana
99	Abu Danladi (GA)	(Ghana)	FW	18 October 1995 (age 30)	(United States) UCLA

== Transfers ==
=== Transfers in ===
Entry date	Position	No.	Player	From club	Ref.
December 20, 2018	MF	8	(Slovakia) Ján Greguš	(Denmark) F.C. Copenhagen	
January 10, 2019	MF	6	(Cuba) Osvaldo Alonso	(United States) Seattle Sounders FC	
January 25, 2019	DF	19	(Madagascar) Romain Métanire	(France) Stade Reims	
January 28, 2019	DF	3	(United States) Ike Opara	(United States) Sporting Kansas City	
March 15, 2019	MF	12	(Kenya) Lawrence Olum	(United States) Portland Timbers	
July 16, 2019	MF	16	(Finland) Robin Lod	(Spain) Sporting Gijón	
July 23, 2019	DF	86	(France) Wilfried Moimbé	(France) AS Nancy	
August 7, 2019	MF	11	(Uruguay) Thomás Chacón	(Uruguay) Danubio FC	

=== MLS SuperDraft ===
Any player marked with a * is part of the Generation Adidas program.

Round	Pick	Player	Position	Previous club	Status	Ref
1	7	(Canada) Dayne St. Clair*	Goalkeeper	Maryland	Signed	
1	15	(United States) Chase Gasper	Defender	Maryland	Signed	
2	31	(United States) Hassani Dotson	Midfield	Oregon State	Signed	
4	75	(United States) Kevin Rodriguez	Forward	NIU	Not signed	
4	94	(Australia) Mitch Osmond	Defender	Rio Grande	Not signed	

1. Acquired from FC Dallas via Chicago Fire for $50,000 in General Allocation Money
2. Acquired from Orlando City SC along with the #1 spot in the MLS Waiver Order and additional fourth round selection in exchange for the #4 spot in the MLS Waiver Order and a second round selection in the 2020 MLS SuperDraft
3. Acquired from New York Red Bulls via Orlando City SC along with the #1 spot in the MLS Waiver Order and additional fourth round selection in exchange for the #4 spot in the MLS Waiver Order and a second round selection in the 2020 MLS SuperDraft

=== Transfers out ===
Exit date	Position	No.	Player	To club	Notes	Ref.
November 26, 2018	DF	3	(Switzerland) Jérôme Thiesson	(Switzerland) FC Rapperswil-Jona	Option declined	
November 26, 2018	MF	7	(Brazil) Ibson	(Brazil) Tombense FC	Option declined	
November 26, 2018	DF	8	(United States) Marc Burch	(United States) Memphis 901 FC	Option declined	
November 26, 2018	MF	12	(Brazil) Fernando Bob	Free agent	Option declined	
November 26, 2018	MF	16	(England) Harrison Heath	(United States) Miami FC	Contract expired	
November 26, 2018	MF	19	(Cameroon) Frantz Pangop	(Germany) SC Rheindorf Altach	Option declined	
November 26, 2018	GK	24	(United States) Alex Kapp	Free agent	Option declined	
November 26, 2018	MF	26	(United States) Collen Warner	(Denmark) FC Helsingør	Option declined	
November 26, 2018	DF	27	(Cameroon) Bertrand Owundi	(Canada) Forge FC	Option declined	
November 26, 2018	GK	28	(United States) Matt Lampson	(United States) LA Galaxy	Option declined	
November 26, 2018	MF	29	(Brazil) Maximiniano	(Brazil) Fluminense FC	Loan expired	
November 26, 2018	MF	32	(Peru) Alexi Gomez	(Peru) Club Universitario de Deportes	Loan expired	
November 26, 2018	MF		(Costa Rica) Johan Venegas	(Costa Rica) Saprissa	Contract expired	
March 1, 2019	MF		(United States) Sam Cronin	Retired	Contract buyout	
May 4, 2019	DF	5	(Costa Rica) Francisco Calvo	(United States) Chicago Fire	Traded	
July 29, 2019	DF	4	(United States) Eric Miller	(United States) New York City FC	Traded	

=== Loans in ===
Start date	End date	Position	No.	Player	From club	Ref.
February 10, 2019	January 1, 2020	GK	1	(Italy) Vito Mannone	(England) Reading	
March 4, 2019	End of season	MF		(Tanzania) Ally Hamis Ng'anzi	(Czech Republic) MFK Vyškov	

=== Loans out ===
Start date	End date	Position	No.	Player	To club	Ref.
March 4, 2019	End of season	MF		(Tanzania) Ally Hamis Ng'anzi	(United States) Forward Madison FC	
May 21, 2019	June 2020	MF	11	(Ecuador) Romario Ibarra	(Mexico) Pachuca	
August 6, 2019	End of Season	GK	33	(United States) Bobby Shuttleworth	(United States) Sacramento Republic FC	

== Friendlies ==
Win Loss Draw

January 29, 2019	FC Tucson	2–9	Minnesota United FC	Tucson, Arizona
10:00 a.m. CST	Goal		Schüller, R. Ibarra (pen.), Toyama,, Toye,	Stadium: Kino North Stadium

February 2, 2019 2019 Mobile Mini Sun Cup	Phoenix Rising FC	0–0	Minnesota United FC	Tucson, Arizona
3:00 p.m. CST	Mala (yellow card) 85'	PHX Report		Stadium: Kino North Stadium

February 6, 2019 2019 Mobile Mini Sun Cup	Minnesota United FC	0–0	Houston Dynamo	Tucson, Arizona
7:00 p.m. CST	Calvo (red card) 40'; Conner (yellow card) 108'		Quioto (yellow card) 43'	Stadium: Kino North Stadium

February 16, 2019 Orlando City Invitational	New England Revolution	0–1	Minnesota United FC	Orlando, Florida
3:30 p.m. CST	Caicedo (yellow card) 38'	MLS Report; NER Report	M. Ibarra 67'; Alonso (yellow card) 68'	Stadium: Orlando City Stadium

February 17, 2019 Scrimmage	FIU Panthers	0–1	Minnesota United FC	Deltona, Florida
CST		Report	Toye	Stadium: Dewey O. Boster Sports Complex

February 20, 2019 Orlando City Invitational	New York City FC	0–1	Minnesota United FC	Orlando, Florida
3:30 p.m. CST			Ibarra 26'	Stadium: Orlando City Stadium

February 23, 2019 Scrimmage	Orlando City SC	1–3	Minnesota United FC	Orlando, Florida
11:00 a.m. CST			Boxall; R. Ibarra,	Stadium: Orlando City Stadium

May 22, 2019	Minnesota United FC (United States)	0–1	(Germany) Hertha BSC	St Paul, Minnesota
7:00 p.m. CST			Pekarík 43'	Stadium: Allianz Field

June 25, 2019	Forward Madison FC	1–2	Minnesota United FC	Madison, Wisconsin
	Tobin 57'	Report	Toye 24', 80'; Kallman (yellow card) 68'	Stadium: Breese Stevens Field

July 17, 2019	Minnesota United FC (United States)	0–3	(England) Aston Villa	St Paul, Minnesota
7:00 p.m. CST	Ng'anzi (yellow card) 75'	Report	Grealish 37'; Lansbury 82'; Bjarnason 87'	Stadium: Allianz Field

Sept 7, 2019	Minnesota United FC (United States)	2–2	(Mexico) Pachuca	St Paul, Minnesota
7:00 p.m. CST	Wilfried Moimbe 44'; Abu Danladi 78'	Report	Luis Chávez 62'; Rubens Sambueza 68'	Stadium: Allianz Field

== Competitions ==
=== Overview ===
Competition	Record							
Competition	G	W	D	L	GF	GA	GD	Win %
MLS	34	15	8	11	52	43	+9	44.12
U.S. Open Cup	5	4	0	1	16	7	+9	80.00
MLS Cup Playoffs	1	0	0	1	1	2	−1	0.00
Total	40	19	8	13	69	52	+17	47.50

Updated to match played Nov. 10th, 2019
Source: Competitions

=== MLS ===
2019 MLS Western Conference standings
Pos	Team	Pld	W	L	T	GF	GA	GD	Pts	Qualification
1	Los Angeles FC	34	21	4	9	85	37	+48	72	MLS Cup Conference Semifinals
2	Seattle Sounders FC	34	16	10	8	51	49	+2	56	MLS Cup First Round
3	Real Salt Lake	34	16	13	5	45	41	+4	53	MLS Cup First Round
4	Minnesota United FC	34	15	11	8	52	42	+10	53	MLS Cup First Round
5	LA Galaxy	34	16	15	3	56	55	+1	51	MLS Cup First Round
6	Portland Timbers	34	14	13	7	49	48	+1	49	MLS Cup First Round
7	FC Dallas	34	13	12	9	48	46	+2	48	MLS Cup First Round
8	San Jose Earthquakes	34	13	16	5	51	52	−1	44	
9	Colorado Rapids	34	12	16	6	57	60	−3	42	
10	Houston Dynamo	34	12	18	4	45	57	−12	40	
11	Sporting Kansas City	34	10	16	8	49	67	−18	38	
12	Vancouver Whitecaps FC	34	8	16	10	37	58	−21	34	

Source: MLS
Rules for classification: 1) points; 2) total wins; 3) total goal differential; 4) total goals scored; 5) disciplinary points; 6) away goal differential; 7) away goals scored; 8) home goals scored; 9) home goal differential; 10) coin toss or drawing of lots

==== Overall table ====
2019 MLS regular season standings
Pos	Team	Pld	W	L	T	GF	GA	GD	Pts	Qualification
1	Los Angeles FC (S)	34	21	4	9	85	37	+48	72	CONCACAF Champions League
2	New York City FC	34	18	6	10	63	42	+21	64	CONCACAF Champions League
3	Atlanta United FC	34	18	12	4	58	43	+15	58	CONCACAF Champions League
4	Seattle Sounders FC (C)	34	16	10	8	52	49	+3	56	CONCACAF Champions League
5	Philadelphia Union	34	16	11	7	58	50	+8	55	
6	Real Salt Lake	34	16	13	5	46	41	+5	53	
7	Minnesota United FC	34	15	11	8	52	43	+9	53	
8	LA Galaxy	34	16	15	3	58	59	−1	51	
9	Toronto FC	34	13	10	11	57	52	+5	50	
10	D.C. United	34	13	10	11	42	38	+4	50	
11	Portland Timbers	34	14	13	7	52	49	+3	49	
12	New York Red Bulls	34	14	14	6	53	51	+2	48	
13	FC Dallas	34	13	12	9	54	46	+8	48	
14	New England Revolution	34	11	11	12	50	57	−7	45	
15	San Jose Earthquakes	34	13	16	5	52	55	−3	44	
16	Colorado Rapids	34	12	16	6	58	63	−5	42	
17	Chicago Fire	34	10	12	12	55	47	+8	42	
18	Montreal Impact	34	12	17	5	47	60	−13	41	CONCACAF Champions League
19	Houston Dynamo	34	12	18	4	49	59	−10	40	
20	Columbus Crew SC	34	10	16	8	39	47	−8	38	
21	Sporting Kansas City	34	10	16	8	49	67	−18	38	
22	Orlando City SC	34	9	15	10	44	52	−8	37	
23	Vancouver Whitecaps FC	34	8	16	10	37	59	−22	34	
24	FC Cincinnati	34	6	22	6	31	75	−44	24	

Source: MLS
Rules for classification: 1) points; 2) total wins; 3) total goal differential; 4) total goals scored; 5) disciplinary points; 6) away goals scored; 7) away goal differential; 8) coin toss or drawing of lots
(C) MLS Cup champion; (S) Supporters' Shield winner

==== Results summary ====
Overall								Home						Away					
Pld	W	D	L	GF	GA	GD	Pts	W	D	L	GF	GA	GD	W	D	L	GF	GA	GD
28	13	6	9	45	35	+10	45	8	5	1	22	9	+13	5	1	8	23	26	−3

Last updated: Sept 2, 2019.
Source: Match reports

==== Results by round ====
Round	1	2	3	4	5	6	7	8	9	10	11	12	13	14	15	16	17	18	19	20	21	22	23	24	25	26	27	28	29	30	31	32	33	34
Stadium	A	A	A	A	A	H	A	H	H	H	A	H	H	A	H	H	H	H	A	H	A	H	H	A	H	H	A	A	A	H	A	H	H	A
Result	W	W	L	L	W	D	L	D	W	D	L	W	W	L	L	L	W	W	W	W	D	D	W	L	W	D	L	W	L	W	D	W	D	L

Updated to match(es) played on Sept 16, 2019. Source: Match reports
A = Away; H = Home; W = Win; D = Draw; L = Loss

==== Matches ====
March 2, 2019 Match 1	Vancouver Whitecaps FC	2–3	Minnesota United FC	Vancouver, British Columbia
5:00 p.m. CST	Godoy 6'; Erice (yellow card) 31'; Cornelius (yellow card) 45'; Henry 81'	Report	Alonso (yellow card) 24'; Quintero 37' (pen.); Calvo 66' (yellow card) 79'; Ibarra 45' (yellow card) 70'	Stadium: BC Place; Attendance: 27,837; Referee: Rubiel Vazquez

March 9, 2019 Match 2	San Jose Earthquakes	0–3	Minnesota United FC	San Jose, California
7:00 p.m. CST	Eriksson (yellow card) 3'; Godoy (yellow card) 61'	Report	Quintero 49' (pen.); Miguel Ibarra 52'; Schüller (yellow card) 65'; Cummings 75' (o.g.)	Stadium: Avaya Stadium; Attendance: 16,411; Referee: Marcos DeOliveira

March 16, 2019 Match 3	LA Galaxy	3–2	Minnesota United FC	Carson, California
9:30 p.m. CST	dos Santos 36' (pen.); Pontius 41'; Lletget 81'; Corona (yellow card) 82'	Report	Ibarra (yellow card) 60'; Greguš 75'; Rodríguez 87'; Danladi (yellow card) 90+2'	Stadium: StubHub Center; Attendance: 21,177; Referee: Jair Marrufo

March 30, 2019 Match 4	New England Revolution	2–1	Minnesota United FC	Foxborough, Massachusetts
1:00 p.m. CST	Anibaba 10' (yellow card) 72'; Gil (yellow card) 45+2'; Bye 62'; Castillo (yellow card) 74'	Report	Opara (yellow card) 12'; Quintero 26' (pen.); Métanire (yellow card) 54'; Alonso (yellow card) 70'	Stadium: Gillette Stadium; Attendance: 10,657; Referee: Allen Chapman

April 6, 2019 Match 5	New York Red Bulls	1–2	Minnesota United FC	Harrison, New Jersey
1:00 p.m. CST	Cásseres 70'	Report	Danladi 34'; R. Ibarra 50'	Stadium: Red Bull Arena; Attendance: 15,706; Referee: Joseph Dickerson

April 13, 2019 Match 6	Minnesota United FC	3–3	New York City FC	Saint Paul, Minnesota
6:00 p.m. CST	Alonso (yellow card) 8', (goal) 12'; Rodríguez 20'; Johnson 32' (o.g.)	Report	Castellanos 16'; Tajouri-Shradi 18', 64'	Stadium: Allianz Field; Attendance: 19,796; Referee: Alan Kelly

April 19, 2019 Match 7	Toronto FC	4–3	Minnesota United FC	Toronto, Ontario
7:00 p.m. CST	Pozuelo 28', 30'; Delgado (yellow card) 51'; Hamilton 77', 79'	Report	Quintero 17', 70' (pen.), (yellow card) 90+3'; Rodríguez 57'; Greguš (red card) 89'; Calvo (yellow card) 90' (yellow-red card) 90+1'	Stadium: BMO Field; Attendance: 22,651; Referee: Ismail Elfath

April 24, 2019 Match 8	Minnesota United FC	0–0	LA Galaxy	Saint Paul, Minnesota
7:00 p.m. CST	Métanire (yellow card) 40'	Report	Bingham (yellow card) 84'; Skjelvik (yellow card) 90+6'	Stadium: Allianz Field; Attendance: 19,779; Referee: Chris Penso

April 28, 2019 Match 9	Minnesota United FC	1–0	D.C. United	Saint Paul, Minnesota
12:30 p.m. CST	Métanire (yellow card) 19'; Rodríguez 82'	Report	Birnbaum (yellow card) 45'	Stadium: Allianz Field; Attendance: 19,620; Referee: Nima Saghafi

May 4, 2019 Match 10	Minnesota United FC	1–1	Seattle Sounders FC	Saint Paul, Minnesota
7:00 p.m. CST	Opara 26'; Greguš (yellow card) 45'	Recap	Roldan 42'	Stadium: Allianz Field; Attendance: 19,832; Referee: Timothy Ford

May 11, 2019 Match 11	Chicago Fire	2–0	Minnesota United FC	Bridgeview, Illinois
7:00 p.m. CST	Gaitán 21'; Katai 34'; Schweinsteiger (yellow card) 77'	Report	Métanire (yellow card) 42'; Rodríguez (yellow card) 78'; Danladi (yellow card) 90+2'; Quintero (yellow card) 90+3'	Stadium: Toyota Park; Attendance: 11,531; Referee: Marcos DeOliveira

May 18, 2019 Match 12	Minnesota United FC	1–0	Columbus Crew SC	Saint Paul, Minnesota
7:00 p.m. CST	Kallman (yellow card) 52'; Ibarra (yellow card) 63'; Finlay 70'	Report	David Guzmán (yellow card) 62'	Stadium: Allianz Field; Attendance: 19,600; Referee: David Gantar

May 25, 2019 Match 13	Minnesota United FC	1–0	Houston Dynamo	Saint Paul, Minnesota
7:00 p.m. CST	Métanire 20', (yellow card) 90'	Report	Fuenmayor (yellow card) 40'; B. García (yellow card) 66'	Stadium: Allianz Field; Attendance: 19,701; Referee: Joseph Dickerson

May 29, 2019 Match 14	Atlanta United FC	3–0	Minnesota United FC	Atlanta, Georgia
6:00 p.m. CST	Escobar 23', (yellow card) 83'; Robinson (yellow card) 29'; J. Martínez 90+1', 90+4'	Report	Opara (yellow card) 32'; Danladi (yellow card) 49'	Stadium: Mercedes-Benz Stadium; Attendance: 42,703; Referee: Alex Chilowicz

June 2, 2019 Match 15	Minnesota United FC	2–3	Philadelphia Union	Saint Paul, Minnesota
3:00 p.m. CST	Kallman (yellow card) 17'; Dotson 28'; Molino 77'	Report	Monteiro 18' (pen.); Medunjanin 44'; Aaronson (yellow card) 45+2'; Trusty 86'; Wagner (yellow card) 89'; Gaddis (yellow card) 90+1'; Blake (yellow card) 90+3'	Stadium: Allianz Field; Attendance: 19,738; Referee: Allen Chapman

June 8, 2019 Match 16	Colorado Rapids	1–0	Minnesota United FC	Commerce City, Colorado
8:00 p.m. CST	Shinyashiki (yellow card) 26'; Kamara 29'; Mezquida (yellow card) 90+1'; Acosta (yellow card) 90+5'	Report	Gasper (yellow card) 69'; Quintero (yellow card) 78'	Stadium: Dick's Sporting Goods Park; Attendance: 14,160; Referee: Ramy Touchan

June 29, 2019 Match 17	Minnesota United FC	7–1	FC Cincinnati	Saint Paul, Minnesota
6:00 p.m. CST	Opara 18', 70'; Dotson 23'; Finlay 30', (yellow card) 79'; Rodríguez 43', (yellow card) 59'; Ibarra (yellow card) 54'; Toye 75'; Molino 87'	Report	Ledesma 59'; Hoyte (yellow card) 54'	Stadium: Allianz Field; Attendance: 19,778; Referee: Joseph Dickerson

July 3, 2019 Match 18	Minnesota United FC	3–1	San Jose Earthquakes	Saint Paul, Minnesota
7:00 p.m. CST	Quintero 5', (yellow card) 78'; Finlay (yellow card) 45+1'; Boxall 52'; Greguš (yellow card) 76'; Alonso (yellow card) 90+1'; Molino 90+2', (yellow card) 90+3'	Report	López (yellow card) 30'; Thompson 45+2'; Wondolowski (yellow card) 55'	Stadium: Allianz Field; Attendance: 19,653; Referee: Marcos de Oliveira

July 6, 2019 Match 19	Montreal Impact	2–3	Minnesota United FC	Montreal, Quebec
6:30 p.m. CST	Jackson-Hamel 1'; Camacho 13'; Bush (yellow card) 45+1'	Report	Toye 9', 47'; Finlay 45+2' (pen.)	Stadium: Saputo Stadium; Attendance: 16,796; Referee: Alan Kelly

July 13, 2019 Match 20	Minnesota United FC	1–0	FC Dallas	Saint Paul, Minnesota
7:00 p.m. CST	Gasper (yellow card) 59'; Toye (yellow card) 80', (goal) 90+1'	Report	Servania (yellow card) 35'; Acosta (yellow card) 45+2'; González (yellow card) 90+5'	Stadium: Allianz Field; Attendance: 19,906; Referee: Baldomero Toledo

July 20, 2019 Match 21	Real Salt Lake	1–1	Minnesota United FC	Sandy, Utah
9:00 p.m. CST	Lennon (yellow card) 21'; Silva 70'	Report	Greguš (yellow card) 26'; Quintero 57'	Stadium: Rio Tinto Stadium; Attendance: 16,992; Referee: David Gantar

July 27, 2019 Match 22	Minnesota United FC	0–0	Vancouver Whitecaps FC	Saint Paul, Minnesota
7:00 p.m. CST	Finlay (yellow card) 35'; Quintero (yellow card) 67'	Report	Felipe (yellow card) 37'; Hwang (yellow card) 57'	Stadium: Allianz Field; Attendance: 19,845; Referee: Armando Villarreal

August 4, 2019 Match 23	Minnesota United FC	1–0	Portland Timbers	Saint Paul, Minnesota
3:00 p.m. CST	Boxall (yellow card) 75'; Finlay 90+2' (pen.)	Report	Mabiala (yellow card) 39'; Clark (yellow card) 50'; Chará (yellow card) 58'; Cascante (yellow card) 75'	Stadium: Allianz Field; Attendance: 19,726; Referee: Chris Penso

August 10, 2019 Match 24	FC Dallas	5–3	Minnesota United FC	Frisco, Texas
7:00 p.m. CST	Hollingshead 28'; Mosquera 32'; Cannon 45' (yellow card) 90+6'; Badji (yellow card) 72'; Servania 85', 90+3'	Report	Finlay 11', 41'; Ibarra (yellow card) 48'; Dotson (yellow card) 58' (goal) 73'; Boxall (yellow card) 69'; Toye (red card) 90+6'	Stadium: Toyota Stadium; Attendance: 15,168; Referee: Alex Chilowicz

August 14, 2019 Match 25	Minnesota United FC	1–0	Colorado Rapids	Saint Paul, Minnesota
7:00 p.m. CST	Quintero 39'; Gasper (yellow card) 60'; Boxall (yellow card) 83'	Report	Acosta (yellow card) 45'	Stadium: Allianz Field; Attendance: 19,629; Referee: Drew Fischer

August 17, 2019 Match 26	Minnesota United FC	1–1	Orlando City SC	Saint Paul, Minnesota
7:00 p.m. CST	Gregus (yellow card) 32'; Gasper (yellow card) 63'; Opara (yellow card) 70'; Danladi 90+2'	Report	Dwyer (yellow card) 57'; Nani 70' (pen.)	Stadium: Allianz Field; Attendance: 19,738; Referee: Jair Marrufo

August 22, 2019 Match 27	Sporting Kansas City	1–0	Minnesota United FC	Kansas City, Kansas
8:30 p.m. CST	Zusi (yellow card) 81'; Hurtado 88'	Report	Dotson (yellow card) 74'	Stadium: Children's Mercy Park; Attendance: 17,083; Referee: Rubiel Vazquez

September 1, 2019 Match 28	Los Angeles FC	0–2	Minnesota United FC	Los Angeles, California
9:30 p.m. CST	Blessing (yellow card) 90+3'	Report	Toye 25', 29'	Stadium: Banc of California Stadium; Attendance: 22,143; Referee: Armando Villarreal

September 11, 2019 Match 29	Houston Dynamo	2–0	Minnesota United FC	Houston, Texas
9:30 p.m. CST	Manotas 37'; Ramirez 44'; Rodríguez (yellow card) 82'	Report	Gasper (yellow card) 26'	Stadium: BBVA Compass Stadium; Attendance: 13,166; Referee: Timothy Ford

September 15, 2019 Match 30	Minnesota United FC	3 –1	Real Salt Lake	Saint Paul, Minnesota
4:30 p.m. CST	Quintero 20', 51'; Finlay 83'	Report	Rusnák 17'	Stadium: Allianz Field; Attendance: 19,635; Referee: Rosendo Mendoza

September 22, 2019 Match 31	Portland Timbers	0–0	Minnesota United FC	Portland, Oregon
3:00 p.m. CST	Valentin (yellow card) 78'	Report		Stadium: Providence Park; Attendance: 25,218; Referee: Robert Sibiga

September 25, 2019 Match 32	Minnesota United FC	2–1	Sporting Kansas City	Saint Paul, Minnesota
4:30 p.m. CST	Alonso 70'; Gasper (yellow card) 79' (yellow-red card) 90+4'; Dotson 90'	Report	Baráth 7'; Gutiérrez (yellow card) 90+3'; Németh (yellow card) 90+6'	Stadium: Allianz Field; Attendance: 19,609; Referee: Ismail Elfath

September 29, 2019 Match 33	Minnesota United FC	1–1	Los Angeles FC	Saint Paul, Minnesota
6:30 p.m. CST	Toye (yellow card) 43'; Boxall 75'	Report	Vela 70'	Stadium: Allianz Field; Attendance: 19,706; Referee: Drew Fischer

October 6, 2019 Match 34	Seattle Sounders FC	1–0	Minnesota United FC	Seattle, Washington
3:00 p.m. CDT	Torres 29'	Boxscore	Opara (yellow card) 23'	Stadium: CenturyLink Field; Attendance: 47,297; Referee: Kevin Stott

=== MLS Cup Playoffs ===
==== First round ====
October 20, 2019 First Round	Minnesota United FC	1–2	LA Galaxy	Saint Paul, Minnesota
7:30 p.m. CDT	Alonso (yellow card) 80'; Greguš 87'	Report	Polenta (yellow card) 33'; González (yellow card) 44'; Lletget 71'; Dos Santos 75'; Alessandrini (yellow card) 90+1'	Stadium: Allianz Field; Attendance: 19,939; Referee: Ted Unkel

Win Loss Draw

=== U.S. Open Cup ===
June 12, 2019 Round 4	Minnesota United FC	4–1	Sporting Kansas City	Saint Paul, Minnesota
7:00 p.m. CDT	Rodríguez 2'; Olum (yellow card) 39'; Finlay 46'; Quintero 55', 67'; Martin (yellow card) 72'; Dotson (yellow card) 85'	Report	Gerso 27'; Gutiérrez (yellow card) 43'	Stadium: Allianz Field; Attendance: 7,211; Referee: Guido Gonzales Jr.

June 18, 2019 Round 5	Houston Dynamo (Texas)	2–3	Minnesota United FC	Houston, Texas
6:00 p.m. CDT	Peña 9'; Martínez 37'; Fuenmayor (yellow card) 40'	Report	Boxall (yellow card) 20'; Quintero 66', 82'; Toye 89'; Olum (yellow card) 90+4'	Stadium: BBVA Compass Stadium; Attendance: 4,559; Referee: Farhad Dadkho

July 10, 2019 Quarter-final	Minnesota United FC	6–1	New Mexico United	Saint Paul, Minnesota
7:00 p.m. CDT	Rodríguez 10', 18', 45'; Quintero 16'; Greguš 23'; Ibarra 62'	Report	Moar 7'; Wehan (yellow card) 54'	Stadium: Allianz Field; Attendance: 12,401; Referee: Ramy Touchan

August 7, 2019 Semi-final	Minnesota United FC	2–1	(Oregon) Portland Timbers	Saint Paul, Minnesota
7:00 p.m. CDT	Quintero 22' (pen.); Greguš (yellow card) 26'; Boxall (yellow card) 37'; Opara (yellow card) 51'; Toye 64'	Report	Fernández 45+2'; Dielna (yellow card) 76'; Valentin (yellow card) 90+3'	Stadium: Allianz Field; Attendance: 15,073; Referee: Ismail Elfath

August 27, 2019 Final	Atlanta United (Georgia (U.S. state))	2–1	Minnesota United FC	Atlanta, Georgia
7:00 p.m. CDT	Gasper 10' (o.g.); G. Martínez 16'; González Pírez (yellow card) 71' (yellow-red card) 74'; Escobar (yellow card) 87'	Report	Dotson (yellow card) 29'; Alonso (yellow card) 44'; Lod 47'; Gasper (yellow card) 87'	Stadium: Mercedes-Benz Stadium; Attendance: 35,709; Referee: Allen Chapman

== Statistics ==
=== Player statistics ===
As of July 18, 2019

Appearances (Apps.) numbers are for appearances in competitive games only including sub appearances
Red card numbers denote: Numbers in parentheses represent red cards overturned for wrongful dismissal.

No.	Nat.	Player	Pos.	MLS				U.S. Open Cup				Total			
No.	Nat.	Player	Pos.	Apps	Goal	Booked	Sent off (straight red)	Apps	Goal	Booked	Sent off (straight red)	Apps	Goal	Booked	Sent off (straight red)
1	(Italy)	Vito Mannone	GK	20	0	0	0	3	0	0	0	23	0	0	0
2	(United States)	Carter Manley	DF	0	0	0	0	0(1)	0	0	0	0(1)	0	0	0
3	(United States)	Ike Opara	DF	16(1)	3	2	0	2	0	0	0	18(1)	3	2	0
4	(United States)	Eric Miller	DF	5(1)	0	0	0	2(1)	0	0	0	7(2)	0	0	0
6	(Cuba)	Osvaldo Alonso	MF	19	2	4	0	1	0	0	0	20	2	4	0
7	(Trinidad and Tobago)	Kevin Molino	MF	4(4)	3	0	0	1	0	0	0	5(4)	3	0	0
8	(Slovakia)	Ján Greguš	MF	17	1	2	1	2	1	0	0	19	2	2	1
9	(Colombia)	Ángelo Rodríguez	FW	15(5)	5	2	0	3	4	0	0	18(5)	9	2	0
10	(United States)	Miguel Ibarra	MF	13(4)	1	3	0	1(1)	1	0	0	14(5)	2	3	0
12	(Kenya)	Lawrence Olum	MF	2(3)	0	0	0	2	0	2	0	4(3)	0	2	0
13	(United States)	Ethan Finlay	MF	14(6)	3	2	0	2(1)	1	0	0	16(7)	4	2	0
14	(United States)	Brent Kallman	DF	12(2)	0	2	0	0	0	0	0	12(2)	0	2	0
15	(New Zealand)	Michael Boxall	DF	15	1	0	0	3	0	1	0	18	1	1	0
17	(United States)	Collin Martin	MF	1(1)	0	0	0	1	0	1	0	2(1)	0	1	0
19	(Madagascar)	Romain Métanire	DF	14	1	5	0	0	0	0	0	14	1	5	0
20	(Finland)	Rasmus Schuller	MF	10(4)	0	1	0	0	0	0	0	10(4)	0	1	0
22	(United States)	Wyatt Omsberg	DF	0	0	0	0	1	0	0	0	1	0	0	0
23	(United States)	Mason Toye	FW	1(4)	4	0	0	0(3)	1	0	0	1(7)	5	0	0
25	(Colombia)	Darwin Quintero	MF	16(2)	6	3	0	3	5	0	0	19(2)	11	3	0
31	(United States)	Hassani Dotson	MF	7(5)	2	0	0	3	0	1	0	10(5)	2	1	0
77	(United States)	Chase Gasper	DF	4(1)	0	2	0	3	0	0	0	7(1)	0	2	0
97	(Canada)	Dayne St. Clair	GK	0	0	0	0	0	0	0	0	0	0	0	0
99	(Ghana)	Abu Danladi	FW	4(9)	1	3	0	0	0	0	0	4(9)	1	3	0
17	(Finland)	Robin Lod	MF	10	0	0	0	2	1	0	0	12	1	0	0
Players who left the club in trade or on loan
5	(Costa Rica)	Francisco Calvo	DF	7	1	2	1	0	0	0	0	7	1	2	1
11	(Ecuador)	Romario Ibarra	MF	4(4)	2	1	0	0	0	0	0	4(4)	2	1	0
33	(United States)	Bobby Shuttleworth	GK	0	0	0	0	0	0	0	0	0	0	0	0
Own goals					2				0				2		
Totals					37	34	2		13	5	0		50	39	2

Source: (for players and positions) First Team Squad (for squad numbers), 2019 Stats (for actual stats.)

=== Clean sheets ===
As of February 20, 2020

No.	Player	MLS	US Open Cup	Total
1	(Italy) Mannone	11	0	11
Total		11	0	11

=== Attendance ===
As of August 11, 2019

Total	Games	Average	Season highest
236,974	12	19,748	19,906

==== By game ====
Date	Opponent	Attendance	Score
April 13	New York City FC	19,796	3–3
April 25	LA Galaxy	19,779	0–0
April 28	D.C. United	19,620	1–0
May 10	Seattle Sounders FC	19,832	1–1
May 18	Columbus Crew SC	19,600	1–0
May 25	Houston Dynamo	19,701	1–0
June 2	Philadelphia Union	19,738	2–3
June 29	FC Cincinnati	19,778	7–1
July 3	San Jose Earthquakes	19,653	3–1
July 13	FC Dallas	19,906	1–0
July 27	Vancouver Whitecaps FC	19,845	0–0
Aug 4	Portland Timbers	19,726	1–0
Aug 14	Colorado Rapids	19,629	1–0
