= Michael Boxall =

New Zealand footballer (born 1988)

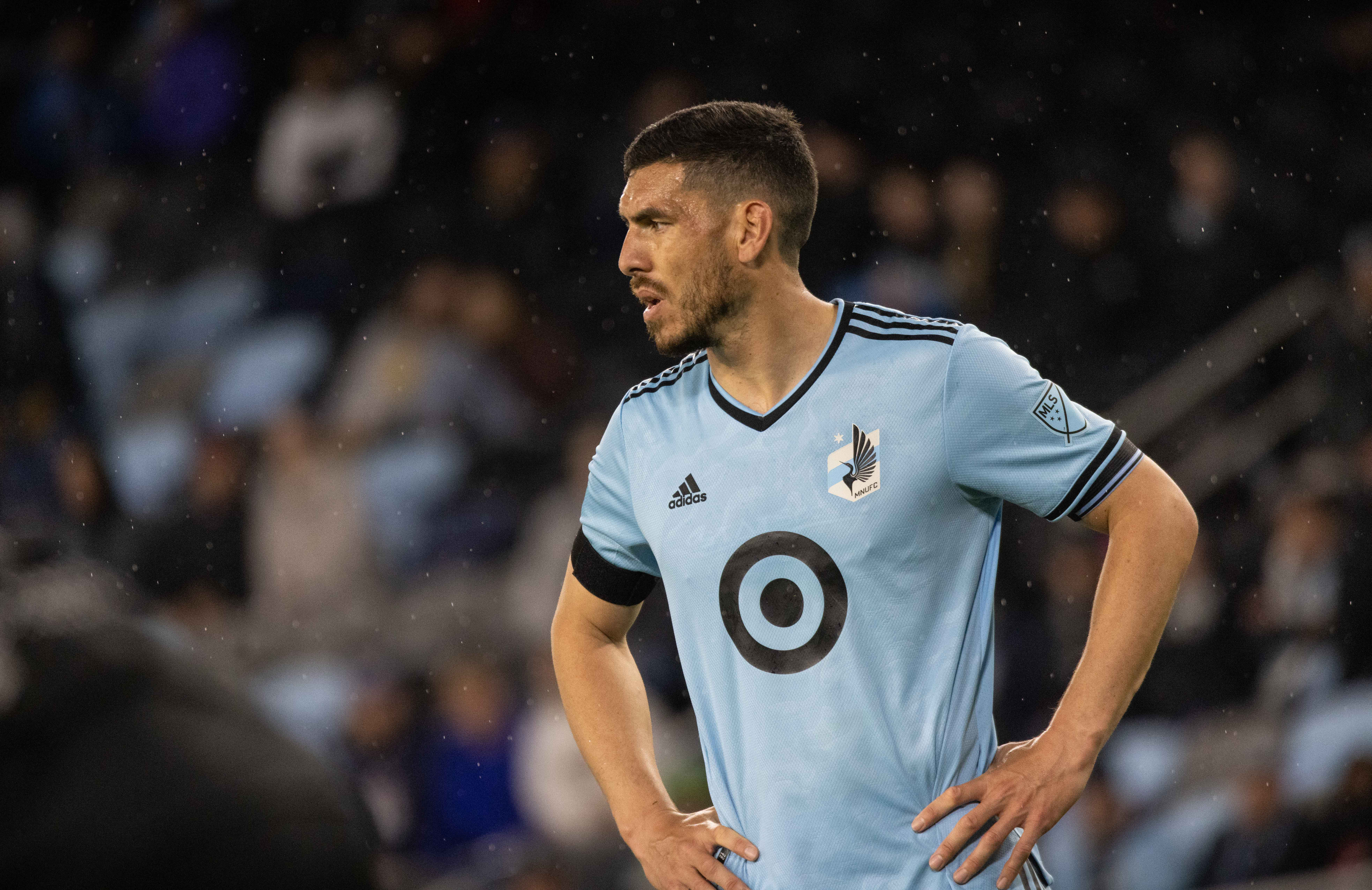
- Boxall with Minnesota United in 2022

Personal information
- Full name: Michael Joseph Boxall
- Date of birth: 18 August 1988 (age 38)
- Place of birth: Auckland, New Zealand
- Height: 1.88 m (6 ft 2 in)
- Position: Defender

Team information
- Current team: Minnesota United
- Number: 15

Youth career
- Three Kings United
- Mount Albert Grammar School

College career
Years	Team	Apps	(Gls)
2007–2010	UC Santa Barbara Gauchos	78	(1)

Senior career*
Years	Team	Apps	(Gls)
- Ellerslie
- Central United
2006–2007	Auckland City	4	(0)
2011–2012	Vancouver Whitecaps	19	(0)
2011	→ Vancouver Whitecaps U-23 (loan)	1	(0)
2012	→ Vancouver Whitecaps U-23 (loan)	2	(1)
2013–2015	Wellington Phoenix	39	(2)
2013	→ Oakleigh Cannons (loan)	11	(1)
2014–2015	Wellington Phoenix Reserves	2	(0)
2015–2017	SuperSport United	53	(4)
2017–	Minnesota United	236	(8)

International career^{‡}
2005–2007	New Zealand U20	14	(0)
2007–2008	New Zealand U23	12	(1)
2021–2024	New Zealand Olympic (O.P.)	3	(0)
2006	New Zealand A	2	(0)
2011–	New Zealand	66	(1)
- * Club domestic league appearances and goals as of 25 May 2025 ‡ National team caps and goals as of 27 June 2026

Michael Joseph Boxall (born 18 August 1988) is a New Zealand professional footballer who plays as a defender for Major League Soccer club Minnesota United and the New Zealand national team.

== Early life and education ==
Boxall was born on 18 August 1988 in Auckland, New Zealand. He attended and played for Mount Albert Grammar School. With Boxall anchoring the defence, Mount Albert won the league title in 2004 and 2005 and placed first at the national tournament in 2005. In his senior season in 2006, Boxall was named the team captain. He led the team to a second Knockout Cup title in three years. They also went to the Auckland Secondary School Soccer Association Championship. Mt. Albert went on to finish second at nationals that year.

Boxall played for teams in his native New Zealand including Ellerslie AFC, Three Kings United, Central United, and Auckland City FC, leading Central United to the 2007 Lotto Sport Italia NRFL Premier title. In addition, Boxall won the NZFC with Auckland City, where he made 6 appearances that year despite scoring zero goals. He was named the Auckland City Young Player of the Year with Central United in 2006 and then again with Auckland City FC in 2007.

Boxall was recruited to play college soccer at the University of California, Santa Barbara by head coach Tim Vom Steeg. He followed in the footsteps of other New Zealand players at Santa Barbara such as Tony Lochhead and Neil Jones, both of whom have received senior international caps after appearing for UCSB. In his first season with the Gauchos, Boxall played in 12 games, starting 10. He provided no goals nor assists but proved to be a solid defensive rock alongside Gaucho defensive stalwart Andy Iro. Boxall's season was cut short due to a knee injury which forced him to miss the rest of the year. Despite missing half the season, Boxall led all rookies with 10 starts and tied for the team-high in both yellow and red cards, 6 and 1 respectively.

== Playing career ==
=== Vancouver Whitecaps FC ===
Boxall was selected first overall in the 2011 MLS Supplemental Draft by Vancouver Whitecaps FC. He agreed to terms with the club on 17 March 2011, and made his professional debut on 19 March, in Vancouver's 2011 MLS opener against Toronto FC. After appearing in three matches for the Whitecaps in the 2012 season, Boxall was waived on 22 June 2012.

=== Wellington Phoenix ===
On 10 July 2012, it was confirmed by the club that Boxall officially joined the Wellington Phoenix of his native New Zealand on a two-year contract. Instrumental in signing Boxall was Ricki Herbert, coach of both the Phoenix and the New Zealand national team at the time. Boxall debuted for the club on 14 October 2012, in the 1–1 away draw against Melbourne Heart in Round 2. After the beginning to his time in Wellington which saw him play backup to Ben Sigmund and Andrew Durante, Boxall was loaned to the Oakleigh Cannons of the Victorian Premier League. Following a disappointing first season with the Phoenix, Boxall signed a one-year contract extension on 15 January 2014. Boxall stated that the club's direction under new head coach Ernie Merrick was the deciding factor in signing a new deal with the club. In the 2013–14 season, Boxall appeared in 20 games for the Phoenix, starting 18.

=== SuperSport United ===
Boxall joined SuperSport United, a South African team in the Premier Division, in 2015. He scored five goals and made 68 appearances for SuperSport in league and cup competition over two seasons, winning the Nedbank Cup in the process.

=== Minnesota United FC ===
After his stint in the Confederations Cup, Boxall returned to the United States in July 2017 and signed with the MLS expansion team Minnesota United FC. In his first four seasons with the club, Boxall made 124 total appearances—leading Minnesota overall—and scored four goals. He signed a contract extension in 2021.

During his first Leagues Cup match on 23 July 2023 against Puebla FC, Boxall earned his first career MLS red card for a foul on Guillermo Martínez.

== International career ==
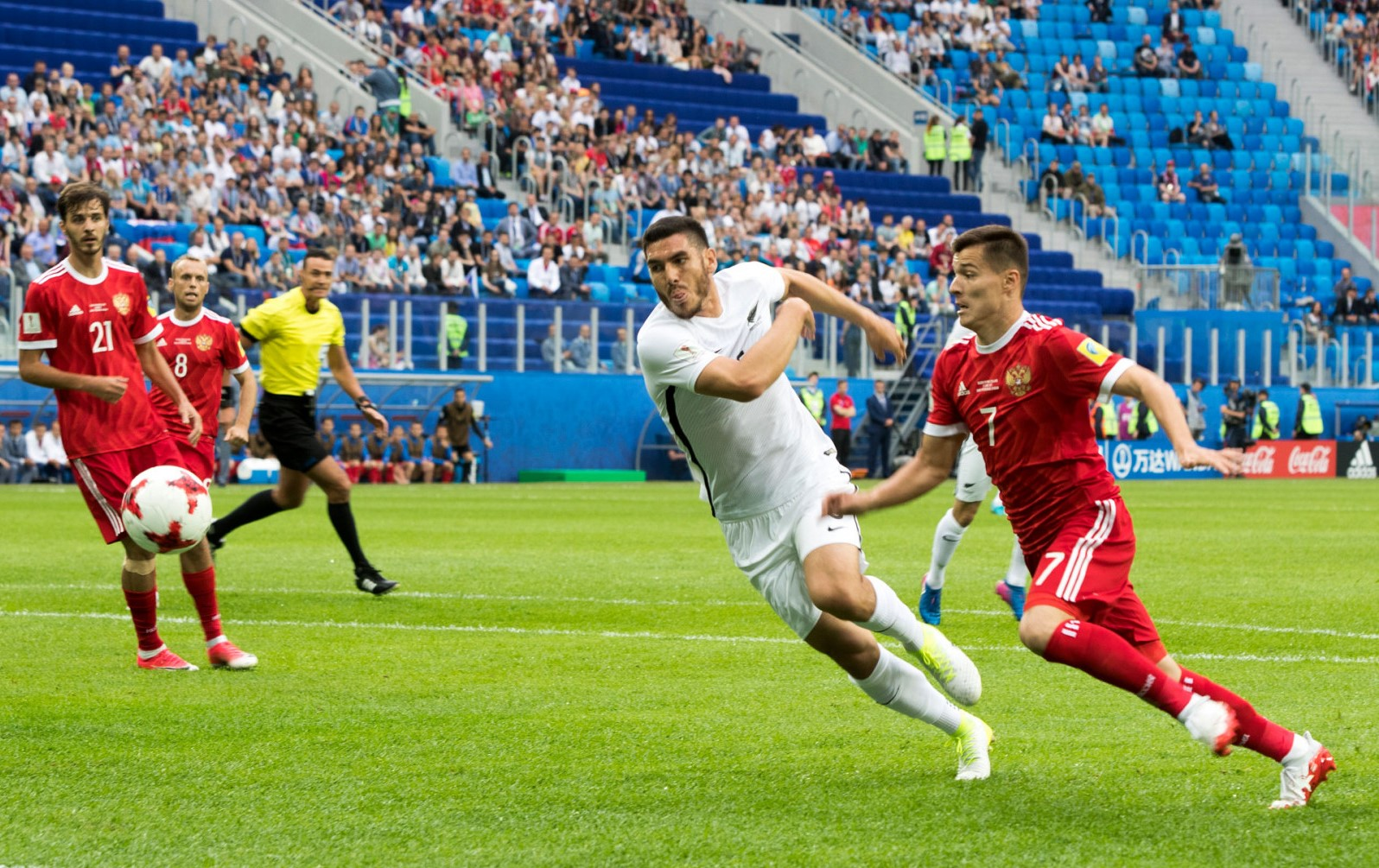
Boxall (centre) playing for New Zealand at the 2017 FIFA Confederations Cup

Boxall has represented New Zealand at various international levels. His début with the national setup was with the Junior All-Whites (U-20s) in which he made 14 appearances with no goals. During this time, he appeared in the 2007 U-20 World Cup OFC qualifying tournament and ultimately the 2007 FIFA U-20 World Cup. He played in all three U-20 World Cup games before New Zealand were knocked out.

Boxall has also represented the New Zealand U-23 Olympic team, known as the Oly-Whites. He played in all 5 2008 OFC Olympic Qualifiers which saw New Zealand advance to their first ever Olympic Games. At the 2008 Summer Olympics, Boxall again appeared in all three of New Zealand's games before they were eliminated. In addition to these eight games, he played four Olympic warm-up matches against Central Coast Mariners, Persikota Tangerang, Indonesia (senior squad), and Persija Jakarta between the Qualifying Tournament and the Beijing Olympic Tournament.

Boxall made two appearances for New Zealand A at the Agribank Cup in Vietnam during October 2006, appearing against Thailand and Bahrain. Both games were held at the Mỹ Đình National Stadium in Hanoi, Vietnam.

Only days after making his Whitecaps debut, Boxall was called up to the All Whites' squad for their match against China on 25 March 2011, where he came on as a second-half substitute.

Boxall was called up as one of three overage players for the New Zealand U-23 Olympic team to play at the 2020 Summer Olympics. However, a thigh injury just before the tournament meant he had to pull out of the squad.

In June 2023, the New Zealand team walked out of an international friendly against Qatar after an alleged incident of racial abuse against Boxall.

On 24 March 2025, Boxall scored the opening goal, a header, for the New Zealand All Whites in their 3–0 victory over New Caledonia to help the All Whites qualify for the 2026 FIFA World Cup. It was his first ever goal for New Zealand, scored at the age of 36. He was later named in the 26-man squad for the tournament.

== Personal life ==
Boxall is of Samoan heritage and is the older brother of New Zealand international footballer Nikko Boxall.

== Career statistics ==
=== Club ===
As of match played 19 November 2026

Appearances and goals by club, season and competition
Club	Season	League			National cup		League cup		Continental		Other		Total	
Club	Season	Division	Apps	Goals	Apps	Goals	Apps	Goals	Apps	Goals	Apps	Goals	Apps	Goals
Auckland City	2006–07	NZ Premiership	4	0	—		—		0	0	—		4	0
Vancouver Whitecaps FC	2011	Major League Soccer	19	0	2	0	—		—		—		21	0
Vancouver Whitecaps FC	2012	Major League Soccer	0	0	0	0	—		—		0	0	0	0
Vancouver Whitecaps FC	Total		19	0	2	0	0	0	0	0	0	0	21	0
Vancouver Whitecaps U23 (loan)	2012	USL PDL	2	1	—		—		—		—		2	1
Wellington Phoenix	2012–13	A-League	4	0	—		—		—		—		4	0
Wellington Phoenix	2013–14	A-League	16	0	—		—		—		—		16	0
Wellington Phoenix	2014–15	A-League	18	2	—		—		—		1	0	19	2
Wellington Phoenix	Total		38	2	0	0	0	0	0	0	1	0	39	2
Oakleigh Cannons (loan)	2013	PL Victoria	11	1	—		—		—		—		11	1
SuperSport United	2015–16	SA Premier Division	25	2	4	1	2	0	—		1 (Note: Appearance(s) in MTN 8)	0	32	3
SuperSport United	2016–17	SA Premier Division	28	2	3	0	4	0	2	0	1	0	38	2
SuperSport United	Total		53	4	7	1	6	0	2	0	2	0	70	5
Minnesota United	2017	Major League Soccer	12	0	—		—		—		—		12	0
Minnesota United	2018	Major League Soccer	32	2	2	0	—		—		—		34	2
Minnesota United	2019	Major League Soccer	29	2	5	0	—		—		1 (Note: Appearance(s) in MLS Cup Playoffs)	0	35	2
Minnesota United	2020	Major League Soccer	19	0	—		—		—		3	0	22	0
Minnesota United	2021	Major League Soccer	17	0	—		—		—		0	0	17	0
Minnesota United	2022	Major League Soccer	31	0	2	0	—		—		1	0	34	0
Minnesota United	2023	Major League Soccer	32	2	2	0	4 (Note: Appearance(s) in Leagues Cup)	0	—		—		34	2
Minnesota United	2024	Major League Soccer	32	1	—		0	0	—		3	0	35	1
Minnesota United	2025	Major League Soccer	31	1	3	0	2	0	—		4	0	40	1
Minnesota United	2026	Major League Soccer	23	0	0	0	1	0	—		—		24	0
Minnesota United	Total		258	8	14	0	7	0	0	0	12	0	291	8
Career total			341	14	23	1	6	0	2	0	14	0	380	13

=== International ===
As of 26 June 2026

Appearances and goals by national team and year
National team	Year	Apps	Goals
New Zealand	2011	3	0
New Zealand	2012	4	0
New Zealand	2013	0	0
New Zealand	2014	4	0
New Zealand	2015	3	0
New Zealand	2016	6	0
New Zealand	2017	11	0
New Zealand	2018	0	0
New Zealand	2019	1	0
New Zealand	2021	3	0
New Zealand	2022	4	0
New Zealand	2023	7	0
New Zealand	2024	6	0
New Zealand	2025	8	1
New Zealand	2026	5	0
Total		66	1

Scores and results list New Zealand's goal tally first, score column indicates score after each Boxall goal.

List of international goals scored by Michael Boxall
No.	Date	Venue	Opponent	Score	Result	Competition
1	24 March 2025	Eden Park, Auckland, New Zealand	New Caledonia	1–0	3–0	2026 FIFA World Cup qualification

== Awards and honours ==
Auckland City FC

- Northern Premier League: 2007
- New Zealand Football Championship: 2007

SuperSport United

- Nedbank Cup: 2016, 2017

New Zealand

- OFC Nations Cup: 2016

Individual

- ACFC Young Player of the Year: 2006, 2007
- All-Big West Honorable Mention: 2008
- All-Big West First Team: 2009
- NSCAA Third Team All-American: 2010
- College Soccer News Third Team All-America: 2010
- All-Far West Region First Team: 2010
- Big West Defender of the Year: 2010
- MLS All-Star: 2025
