= Ethan Finlay =

American soccer player (born 1990)

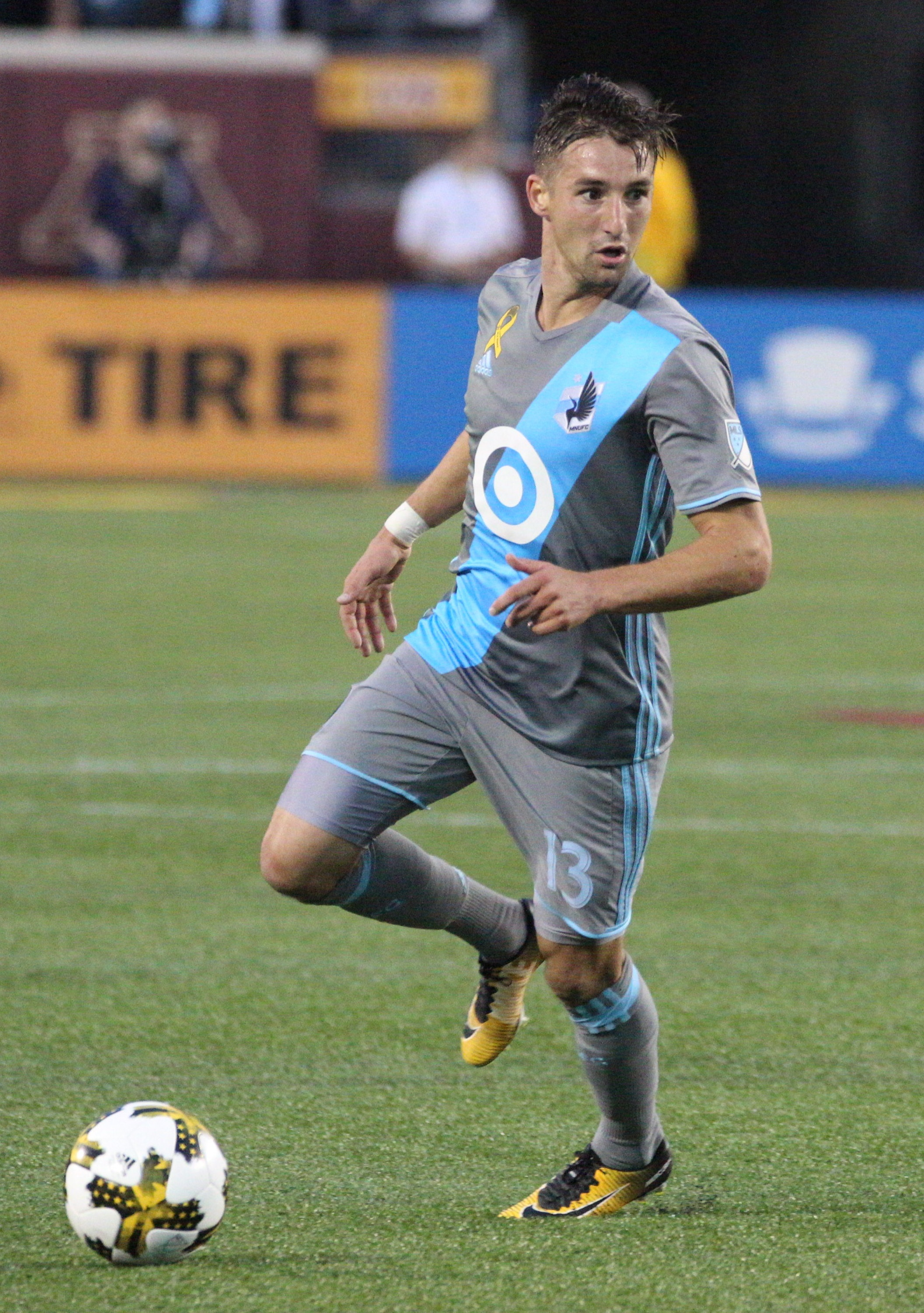
- Finlay with Minnesota United FC in 2017

Personal information
- Full name: Ethan Finlay
- Date of birth: August 6, 1990 (age 36)
- Place of birth: Duluth, Minnesota, United States
- Height: 5 ft 9 in (1.75 m)
- Position: Winger

College career
Years	Team	Apps	(Gls)
2008–2011	Creighton Bluejays	79	(43)

Senior career*
Years	Team	Apps	(Gls)
2010	Chicago Fire Premier	15	(3)
2012–2017	Columbus Crew	150	(30)
2017–2021	Minnesota United	84	(16)
2022–2024	Austin FC	90	(11)
Total		339	(60)

International career^{‡}
2016	United States	3	(0)
- * Club domestic league appearances and goals as of 03:10, October 22, 2024 (UTC) ‡ National team caps and goals as of February 5, 2016

Ethan Christopher Finlay (born August 6, 1990) is an American former professional soccer player who played as a winger.

== Early life ==
Born in Duluth, Minnesota, Finlay's family moved across the U.S. during his childhood and he grew up in Minnesota, North Carolina and Wisconsin where he played high school soccer in Marshfield, Wisconsin.

== Youth and college career ==
Nationally recognized as a top-30 recruit by Rise Magazine and an NSCAA Youth All-American, Finlay set high school records with 98 career goals and 59 assists. As a senior, he tallied 41 goals and 19 assists, earning team MVP honors. His club soccer achievements with FC Milwaukee included four state championships, two regional titles, and national runner-up and third-place finishes.

Finlay played college soccer at Creighton University from 2008 to 2011. As a freshman, he was named to the Missouri Valley Conference (MVC) All-Freshman Team and All-Tournament Team. CollegeSoccerNews.com recognized him as a Third-Team Freshman All-American. That season, he led the team and the MVC with four game-winning goals, scoring six goals in total, including the decisive goal in the MVC Tournament championship against Missouri State.

In 2009, Finlay earned NSCAA First-Team All-Midwest Region and All-MVC First-Team honors and was again named to the MVC All-Tournament Team. He led the team in goals for the second consecutive year, recording five game-winning goals to top the MVC.

As a junior in 2010, Finlay was named MVC Player of the Year and earned NSCAA Second-Team All-America honors. He was also selected to the NSCAA First-Team All-Midwest Region and All-MVC First-Team. A semifinalist for the MAC Hermann Trophy, he received additional accolades from Soccer America, CollegeSoccerNews.com, and other outlets. That year, he led the MVC with 15 goals and was named Creighton Male Athlete of the Year. By the end of his junior season, he was tied for sixth in school history with 29 career goals.

During his senior season in 2011, Finlay set an MVC record with five Offensive Player of the Week awards and led the conference in game-winning goals for the fourth consecutive year. He finished his collegiate career with 43 goals, 20 of which were game-winners, ranking fifth in Creighton history and seventh in MVC history for career goals. Starting all 79 matches during his career, he recorded 10 multi-goal games, including five in his senior year.

Finlay played a key role in leading Creighton to a 21-2-1 record and the College Cup semifinals in 2011, scoring the game-winning overtime goal against South Florida in the NCAA quarterfinals. He earned NSCAA First-Team All-America honors for the second time, becoming just the third player in Creighton history to receive the recognition twice. He was a finalist for the MAC Hermann Trophy and made history as the first two-time MVC Player of the Year in school history and the third in league history. He also became one of six players in Creighton history to earn NSCAA First-Team All-Midwest Region honors three times. In 2011, he was awarded the Fred Ware Award as Nebraska's College Athlete of the Year.

== Club career ==
Columbus Crew selected Finlay in the first round (No. 10 overall) of the 2012 MLS SuperDraft. Finlay made his debut during a 2–0 loss at Colorado Rapids, coming on as a first-half substitute for the injured Dilly Duka in the 12th minute on March 10, 2012. He scored his first MLS goal vs the Portland Timbers in a 3–3 tie in May 2014.

Finlay had a breakout year in the 2015 season, starting every single game in the regular and postseason, while finishing the regular season with 12 goals and 13 assists, and adding an additional goal in the playoffs.

On August 13, 2016, Finlay scored a brace in a 3–3 draw at home versus NYCFC, with his second goal coming in the 5th minute of second-half stoppage time.

On August 9, 2017, Finlay was traded to Minnesota United FC in exchange for $100,000 in Targeted Allocation Money for the 2017 Major League Soccer season, $250,000 in Target Allocation Money for the 2018 MLS season and $75,000 in General Allocation Money for the 2018 MLS season. He scored on his debut for his new club on August 20th in a 2–1 loss at Seattle Sounders FC.

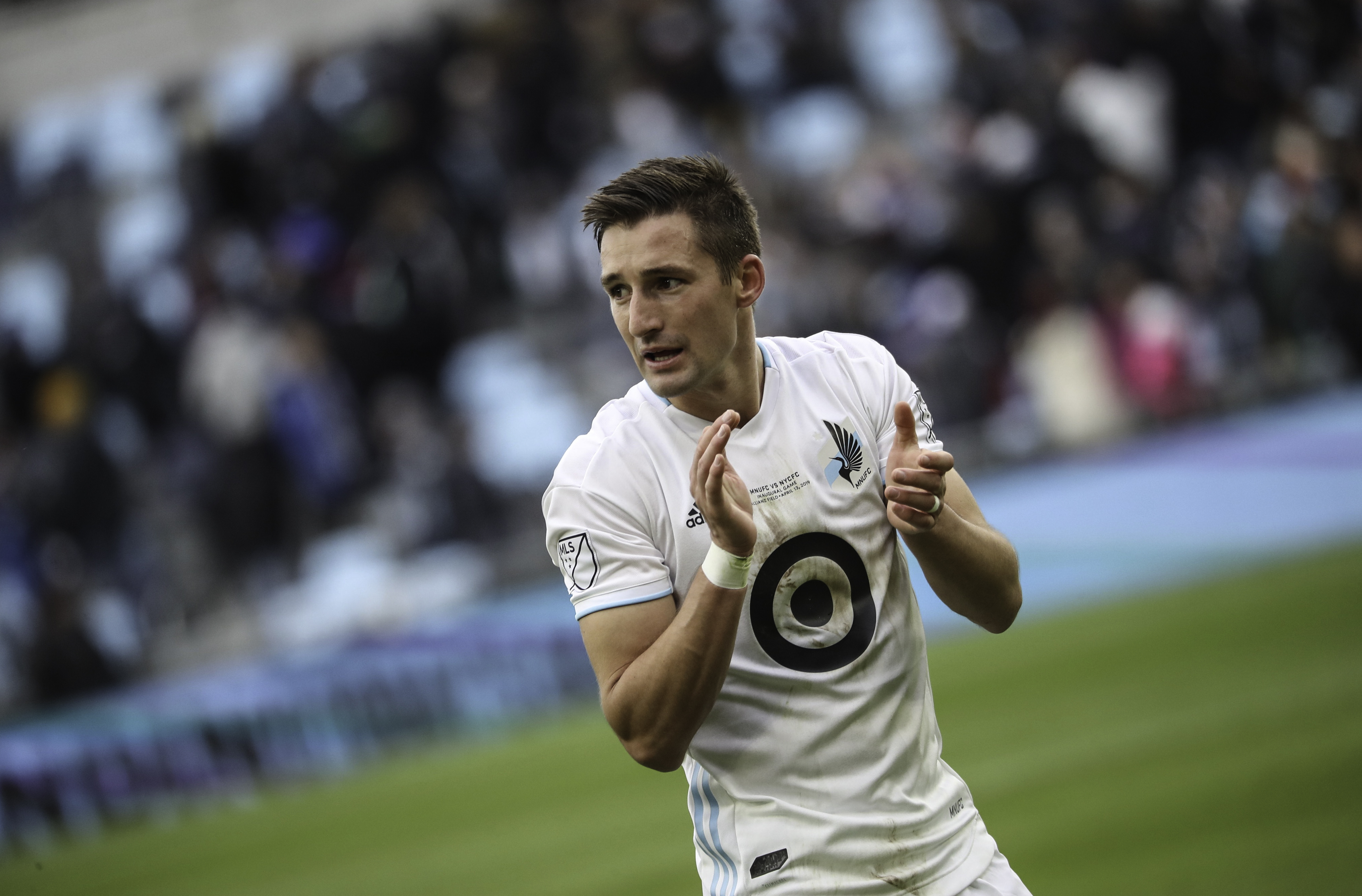
Finlay during a match for Minnesota United in 2019

On December 20, 2021, Finlay signed as a free agent on a two-year deal for Austin FC. As a role player for Austin FC, Finlay continued to produce, becoming the sixth active player with 50 goals and 50 assists in his career, after he produced one of each in a 2–1 win against Seattle Sounders FC. On October 31, 2023, Austin FC agreed to a contract extension with Finlay through the 2024 season, with a club option for 2025. He concluded his three-season stint with Austin at the end of 2024 after making 90 regular-season appearances and scoring 11 goals.

== International career ==
Finlay made his international debut for the United States men's national soccer team on January 31, 2016, in an international friendly against Iceland. In his second game with United States men's national soccer team, Finlay recorded an assist on the USA's game-winning goal against Canada. Finlay was eligible to represent the United States, his country of birth, or Canada, through his Canadian father. He was cap-tied for the United States in the March 29, 2016, qualifier versus Guatemala.

== Career statistics ==
As of October 19, 2024

Appearances and goals by club, season and competition
Club	Season	League			Playoffs (Note: Includes appearances in MLS Cup Playoffs)		U.S. Open Cup		CCL		Other (Note: Includes appearance(s) in Leagues Cup)		Total	
Club	Season	Division	Apps	Goals	Apps	Goals	Apps	Goals	Apps	Goals	Apps	Goals	Apps	Goals
Chicago Fire Premier	2010	PDL	15	3	–		–		–		–		15	3
Columbus Crew	2012	MLS	15	0	–		1	0	–		–		16	0
Columbus Crew	2013	MLS	19	0	–		2	0	–		–		21	0
Columbus Crew	2014	MLS	29	11	2	0	1	0	–		–		32	11
Columbus Crew	2015	MLS	34	12	5	1	1	1	–		–		40	14
Columbus Crew	2016	MLS	34	6	–		2	2	–		–		36	8
Columbus Crew	2017	MLS	19	1	0	0	1	0	—		–		20	1
Columbus Crew	Club Total		150	30	7	1	8	3	0	0	–		165	34
Minnesota United FC	2017	MLS	11	3	—		0	0	—		–		11	3
Minnesota United FC	2018	MLS	7	2	—		0	0	—		–		7	2
Minnesota United FC	2019	MLS	33	7	1	0	5	1	—		–		39	8
Minnesota United FC	2020	MLS	14	4	0	0	—		—		–		14	4
Minnesota United FC	2021	MLS	30	3	—		—		—		–		30	3
Minnesota United FC	Club Total		95	19	1	0	5	1	0	0	–		101	20
Austin FC	2022	MLS	34	5	3	0	1	0	—		–		37	5
Austin FC	2023	MLS	34	5	0	0	2	0	2	0	2	1	40	6
Austin FC	2024	MLS	22	1	0	0	–		–		0	0	22	1
Austin FC	Club Total		90	11	3	0	3	0	2	0	2	1	100	12
Career total			335	60	11	1	16	4	2	0	2	1	367	66

== Honors ==
Individual

- MLS Best XI: 2015
- MLS All-Star: 2015
