= Chase Gasper =

American soccer player (born 1996)

Personal information
- Full name: Chase Blair Gasper
- Date of birth: January 25, 1996 (age 30)
- Place of birth: Alexandria, Virginia, U.S.
- Height: 6 ft 0 in (1.83 m)
- Position: Left-back

Youth career
- 2011–2014: Bethesda SC

College career
| Years | Team | Apps | (Gls) |
| 2014–2016 | UCLA Bruins | 43 | (2) |
| 2017–2018 | Maryland Terrapins | 28 | (0) |

Senior career*
| Years | Team | Apps | (Gls) |
| 2015 | PSA Elite | | |
| 2016–2017 | FC Golden State Force | 3 | (0) |
| 2019–2022 | Minnesota United FC | 63 | (2) |
| 2022 | → Minnesota United 2 (loan) | 1 | (0) |
| 2022–2023 | LA Galaxy | 17 | (0) |
| 2023 | Houston Dynamo | 5 | (0) |
| 2023 | → Houston Dynamo 2 (loan) | 6 | (0) |
| 2024–2025 | Chicago Fire | 4 | (0) |
| 2025 | → Chicago Fire II (loan) | 5 | (1) |

International career^{‡}
| 2013–2014 | United States U18 | 12 | (0) |
| 2016–2017 | United States U21 | 9 | (0) |
| 2020 | United States | 1 | (0) |
- * Club domestic league appearances and goals as of October 25, 2025 ‡ National team caps and goals as of February 1, 2020

Chase Blair Gasper (born January 25, 1996) is an American former professional soccer player who played as a left-back.

== Career ==
After graduating from Gonzaga College High School, Gasper attended the University of California, Los Angeles, where he played college soccer for the Bruins. As a freshman, Gasper helped UCLA win the Pac-12 Conference championship and was named to the All-Freshman Second Team. He only played in 3 games as a junior due to a groin injury. Gasper was granted a medical redshirt by the NCAA.

In 2017, Gasper transferred to the University of Maryland to be closer to his father, who was diagnosed with small-fiber neuropathy. He helped the Terrapins win the 2018 national championship, playing every minute of Maryland's 6 College Cup games.

While in college, Gasper played with PSA Elite during their U.S. Open Cup campaign in 2015, as well as in the Premier Development League with FC Golden State Force in 2016.

=== Professional ===
On January 11, 2019, Gasper was drafted 15th overall in the 2019 MLS SuperDraft by Minnesota United FC after they traded $50,000 of GAM to the Chicago Fire to secure the pick. He missed the first 15 games of the season due to a hamstring injury. He made his debut for Minnesota United on June 8, coming off the bench in a 1–0 loss to the Colorado Rapids. Gasper ended the regular season with 15 appearances, helping the Loons finish 4th in the Western Conference to qualify for the MLS Cup Playoffs for the first time in team history. They lost 2–1 in the first round to the LA Galaxy, with Gasper playing the full match. Gasper also started all 5 of Minnesota's Open Cup games, helping the Loons reach the final, where were defeated 2–1 by Atlanta United FC.

On September 6, 2020, Gasper scored his first goal for Minnesota United in a 4–0 win over Real Salt Lake. In a shortened 2020 season due to the COVID-19 pandemic, Gasper finished with 1 goal and 1 assist while appearing in 18 of a possible 21 regular season games as Minnesota finished 4th in the conference. He played every minute of their 3 playoff games to help Minnesota reach the conference finals where they lost 3–2 to Seattle Sounders FC.

The 2021 season saw Gasper make 30 regular season appearances and score 1 goal, with Minnesota finishing 5th in the West to qualify for the playoffs for the third straight year. Gasper and the Loons were eliminated in the first round, losing 3–1 to the Portland Timbers. On September 16, Gasper and Minnesota United agreed to a four-year contract extension.

Gasper missed the first three games of the 2022 season after picking up a concussion in preseason. On March 16 he left the team and entered the league's Substance Abuse and Behavioral Health program. He rejoined the team a month later. He made an Open Cup appearance for the Loons and played once for Minnesota United 2 prior to being traded.

On May 4, 2022, Gasper was traded to the LA Galaxy in exchange for $450,000 in General Allocation Money, with an additional $300,000 if certain performance metrics are achieved. He made his Galaxy debut on May 8 as a substitute in a 1–0 win over Austin FC. He ended the regular season with 17 appearances for the Galaxy, with 8 of them starts. The Galaxy finished 4th in the West, but Gasper did not appear in their 2 playoff games. On April 13, 2023, Gasper was waived by the Galaxy.

On April 16, 2023, Gasper was claimed off waivers by the Houston Dynamo.

On January 29, 2024, Gasper signed with Chicago Fire in exchange for the Fire's third round pick in the 2026 MLS SuperDraft. Following the 2025 season with Chicago Fire, Gasper retired from professional soccer.

== International ==
On February 1, 2020, Gasper earned his first senior cap for the United States national team as a substitute in a 1–0 friendly win against Costa Rica.

== Career statistics ==
=== Club ===
As of match played June 6, 2023

Appearances and goals by club, season and competition
| Club | Season | League | | | National cup | | Playoffs | | Other | | Total | |
| Club | Season | Division | Apps | Goals | Apps | Goals | Apps | Goals | Apps | Goals | Apps | Goals |
|---|---|---|---|---|---|---|---|---|---|---|---|---|
| PSA Elite | 2015 | SoCal Premier League | ? | ? | 1 | 0 | — | | — | | 1 | 0 |
| FC Golden State Force | 2016 | USL PDL | 3 | 0 | — | | 2 | 0 | — | | 5 | 0 |
| FC Golden State Force | 2017 | USL PDL | 0 | 0 | 0 | 0 | 0 | 0 | — | | 0 | 0 |
| FC Golden State Force | Total | | 3 | 0 | 0 | 0 | 2 | 0 | 0 | 0 | 5 | 0 |
| Minnesota United FC | 2019 | MLS | 15 | 0 | 5 | 0 | 1 | 0 | — | | 21 | 0 |
| Minnesota United FC | 2020 | MLS | 18 | 1 | — | | 3 | 0 | 3 (Note: Appearances in MLS is Back Tournament knockout stage) | 0 | 24 | 1 |
| Minnesota United FC | 2021 | MLS | 30 | 1 | — | | 1 | 0 | — | | 31 | 1 |
| Minnesota United FC | 2022 | MLS | 0 | 0 | 1 | 0 | — | | — | | 1 | 0 |
| Minnesota United FC | Total | | 63 | 2 | 6 | 0 | 5 | 0 | 3 | 0 | 77 | 2 |
| Minnesota United 2 | 2022 | MLS Next Pro | 1 | 0 | — | | — | | — | | 1 | 0 |
| LA Galaxy | 2022 | MLS | 17 | 0 | 1 | 0 | — | | — | | 18 | 0 |
| Houston Dynamo | 2023 | MLS | 5 | 0 | 3 | 0 | 0 | 0 | 0 | 0 | 8 | 0 |
| Career total | | | 89 | 2 | 11 | 0 | 7 | 0 | 3 | 0 | 110 | 2 |

=== International ===
As of match played February 1, 2020

Appearances and goals by national team and year
| National team | Year | Apps | Goals |
|---|---|---|---|
| United States | 2020 | 1 | 0 |
| Total | | 1 | 0 |
