= Abu Danladi =

Ghanaian footballer

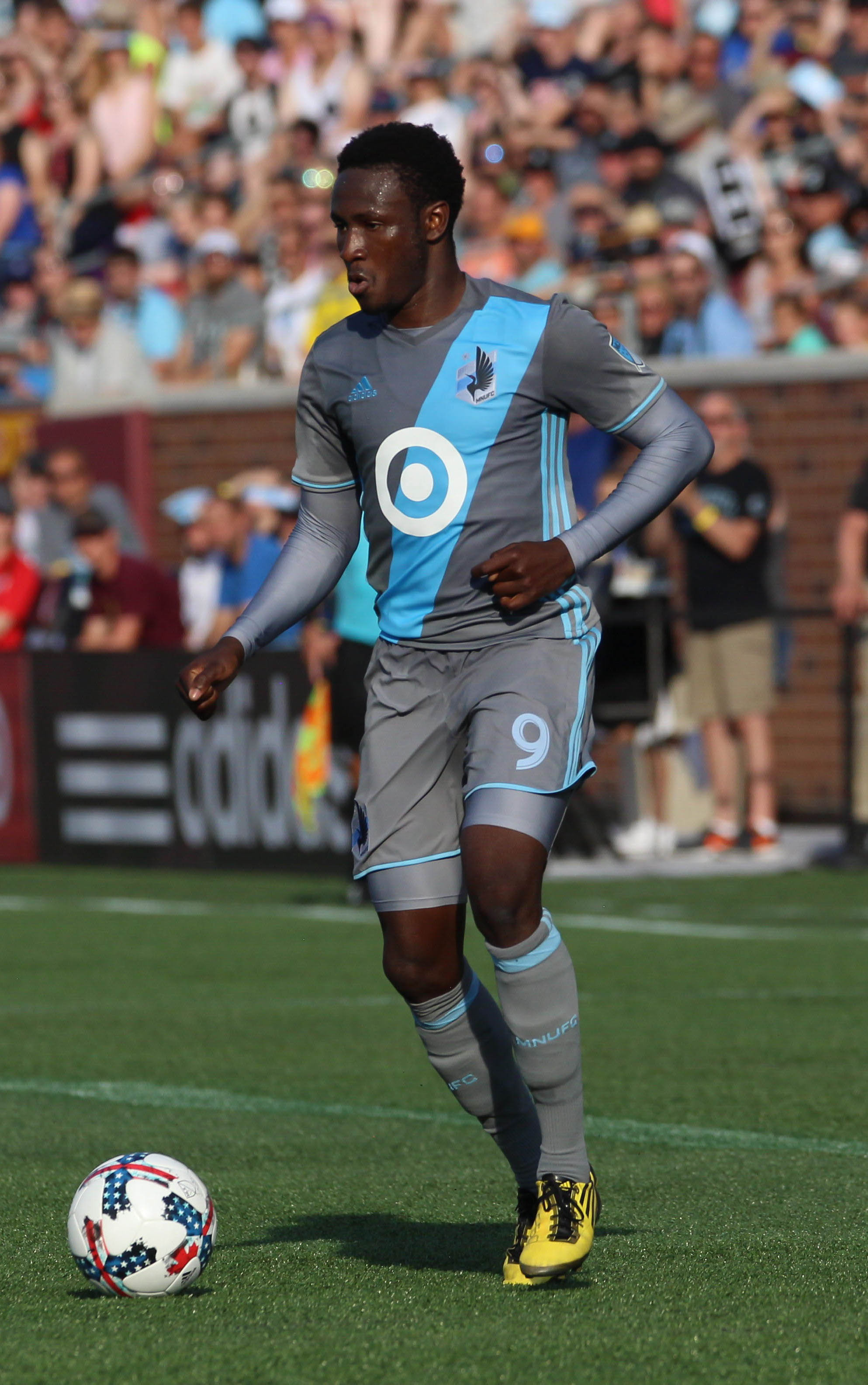
- Danladi playing for Minnesota United in 2017

Personal information
- Full name: Abu Danladi
- Date of birth: October 18, 1995 (age 31)
- Place of birth: Takoradi, Ghana
- Height: 5 ft 10 in (1.78 m)
- Position: Forward

Youth career
- –2011: Right to Dream Academy
- 2011–2014: Santa Barbara Soccer Club

College career
Years	Team	Apps	(Gls)
2014–2016	UCLA Bruins	42	(18)

Senior career*
Years	Team	Apps	(Gls)
2015–2016	Ventura County Fusion	11	(6)
2017–2019	Minnesota United	67	(11)
2019	→ Forward Madison (loan)	1	(0)
2020–2021	Nashville SC	25	(3)
2022	Minnesota United	19	(2)
2022	Minnesota United 2	2	(0)
2023	Bylis	10	(1)
2024	New Mexico United	3	(0)
- * Club domestic league appearances and goals as of November 4, 2024

Abu Danladi (born October 18, 1995) is a Ghanaian footballer who plays as a forward.

== Career ==
=== Amateur & College ===
Abu Danladi graduated from Ghana's Right to Dream Academy. He attended Dunn High School in Los Olivos, California. He played college soccer with the UCLA Bruins. Danladi received the Gatorade Player of the Year award in 2013–14 while playing for Dunn School.

=== Professional ===
On January 4, 2017, Danladi signed a Generation Adidas contract with Major League Soccer. On January 13, Danladi was selected by the expansion Minnesota United with the first overall selection of the 2017 MLS SuperDraft. He scored his first career MLS goal on May 7, 2017, at home versus Sporting Kansas City. He was the runner-up for the 2017 MLS Rookie of the Year Award, behind Julian Gressel.

On November 19, 2019, Danladi was selected by MLS expansion side Nashville SC in the 2019 MLS Expansion Draft. Following the 2021 season Danladi's contract expired with Nashville and he became a free agent.

Following his release from Nashville, Danladi returned to Minnesota United on 13 January 2022, signing a one-year deal. After the 2022 season, his contract option was declined by Minnesota.'

Danladi signed with USL Championship club New Mexico United on January 10, 2024.

== Career statistics ==
As of November 9, 2020

Club	Season	League			Cup		Other		Total	
Club	Season	Division	Apps	Goals	Apps	Goals	Apps	Goals	Apps	Goals
Ventura County Fusion	2016	Premier Development League	11	6	0	0	0	0	11	6
Minnesota United FC	2017	Major League Soccer	27	8	1	0	0	0	28	8
Minnesota United FC	2018	Major League Soccer	16	1	1	0	0	0	16	1
Minnesota United FC	2019	Major League Soccer	24	2	0	0	1	0	25	2
Forward Madison FC (loan)	2019	USL League One	1	0	0	0	0	0	1	0
Nashville SC	2020	Major League Soccer	17	2	0	0	0	0	17	2
Career total			96	12	2	0	1	0	98	19
