= Kevin Molino =

Trinidadian footballer (born 1990)

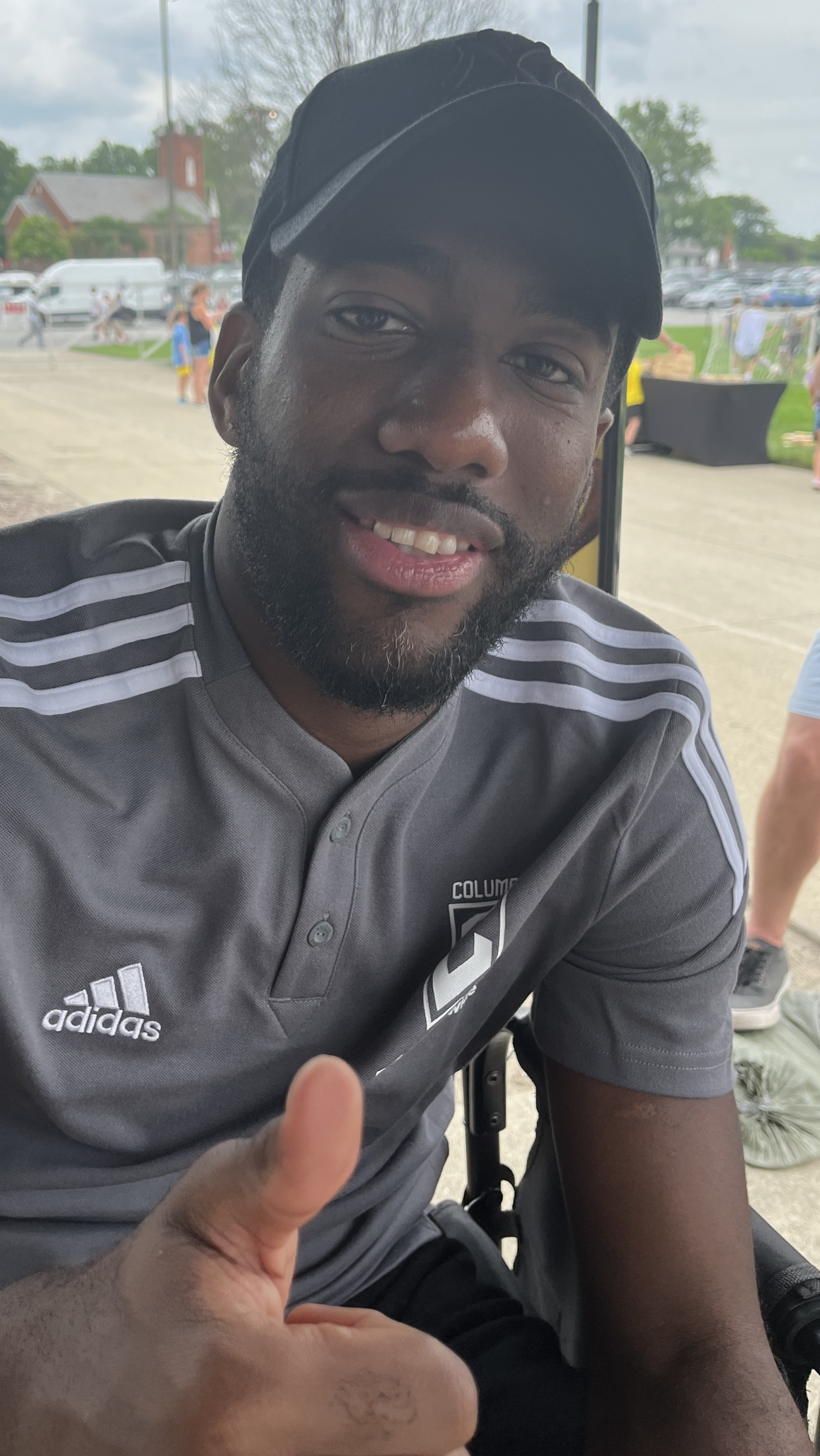
- Molino with Columbus Crew in 2022

Personal information
- Full name: Kevin Reginald Molino
- Date of birth: 17 June 1990 (age 36)
- Place of birth: Carenage, Trinidad and Tobago
- Height: 5 ft 8 in (1.73 m)
- Position: Winger

Team information
- Current team: Defense Force
- Number: 10

Senior career*
Years	Team	Apps	(Gls)
2008	San Juan Jabloteh		
2009–2011	Ma Pau SC		
2011–2016	Orlando City	121	(36)
2017–2020	Minnesota United	67	(21)
2021–2023	Columbus Crew	31	(2)
2023	Columbus Crew 2	1	(0)
2024–	Defence Force	7	(10)

International career^{‡}
2007	Trinidad and Tobago U17	1	(0)
2009	Trinidad and Tobago U20	13	(0)
2011–2013	Trinidad and Tobago U23	6	(5)
2010–	Trinidad and Tobago	75	(27)
- * Club domestic league appearances and goals as of 19:31, 24 January 2025 (UTC) ‡ National team caps and goals as of 22:18, 18 November 2025 (UTC)

Kevin Reginald Molino (born 17 June 1990) is a Trinidadian professional footballer who plays as a winger for and captains TT Pro League club Defence Force F.C. and the Trinidad & Tobago national team.

== Club career ==
=== Orlando City ===
After playing for several years in the TT Pro League, with San Juan Jabloteh and Ma Pau SC, Molino signed with Orlando City in the USL Professional Division on 18 March 2011. He scored his first goal for his new club on 14 May in a 1–0 win over the Pittsburgh Riverhounds. Following two seasons with Orlando, Molino had week-long trials with PSV Eindhoven of the Netherlands and Zulte Waregem of Belgium in hopes of continuing his career in Europe. However, on 13 March 2013, it was announced that Molino had re-signed with Orlando for the 2013 USL Pro season. On 10 January 2014, Molino signed a new two-year contract with Orlando City which would keep him at the club when they transition into Major League Soccer for the 2015 season despite heavy interest from other MLS and foreign suitors. The deal made Molino the first player signed to Orlando's MLS roster.

Molino began the 2014 USL Pro season, the club's final season in the league, with 15 goals in his first 21 matches, the most in the league at that point in the season. Molino tied the league single-season goal scoring record of 15 shared by Dom Dwyer and José Angulo on 16 August 2014 with six games left in the season. Two games later on 23 August 2014, Molino scored in a league match against the Richmond Kickers to bring his goal tally to 16 for the season, setting the new single-season record in the process. Molino concluded Orlando City's final USL Pro season with a goal against the Richmond Kickers, raising his final record-tally to 20 as Orlando City won its third Commissioner's Cup in four years.

On 2 May 2015, during Orlando City's friendly against Ponte Preta, Molino tore his right ACL and missed the remainder of the 2015 MLS season. On 3 April 2016, Molino scored his first goal for Orlando City from a penalty in a 4–1 win over Portland Timbers.

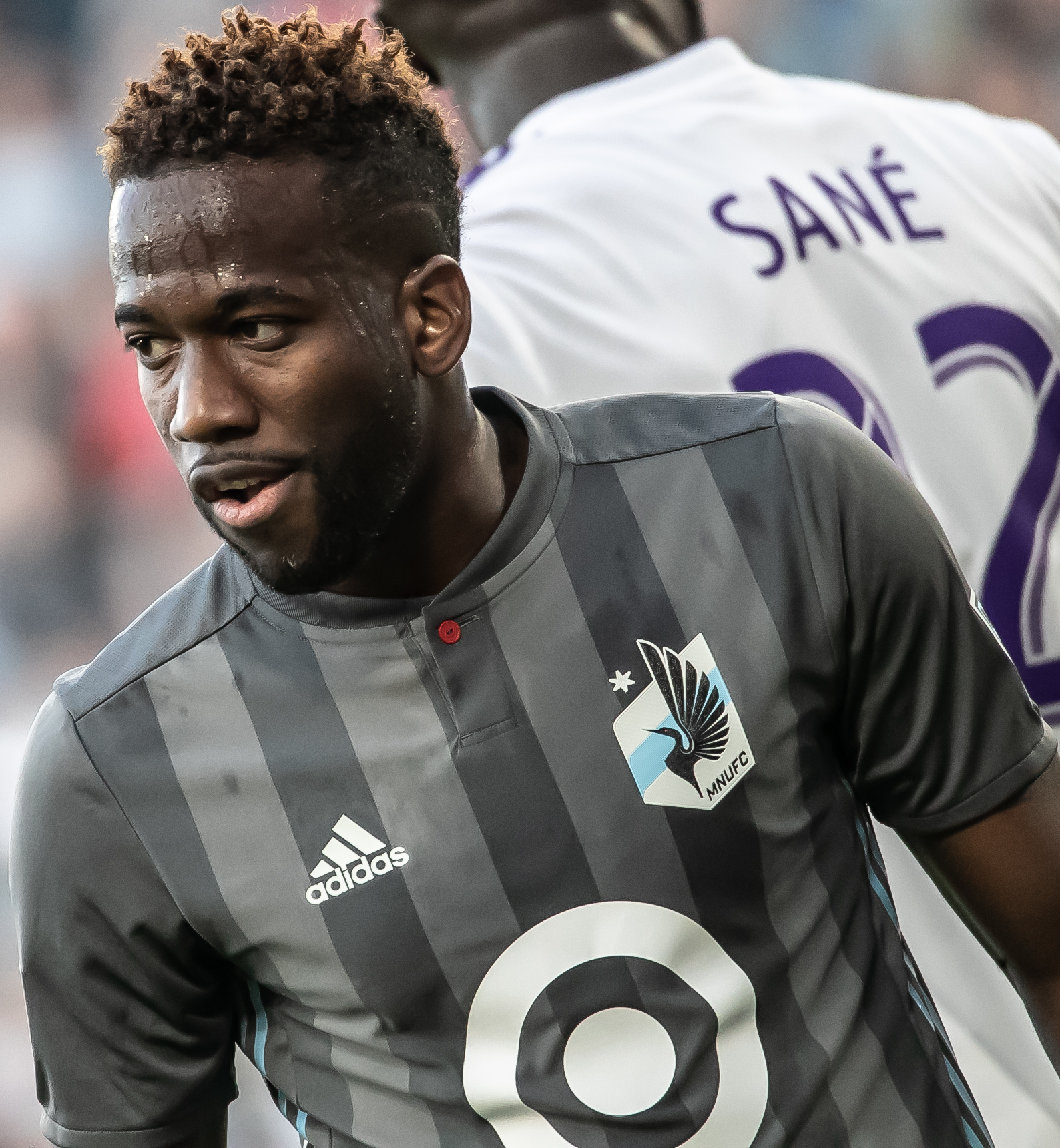
Molino with Minnesota United in 2019

=== Minnesota United ===
On 26 January 2017 it was announced that Molino would rejoin former coach Adrian Heath at Minnesota United FC after Minnesota paid Orlando City $650,000 in allocation money for the player. The transfer fee paid was reportedly tied for the largest exchange in league history. On 10 March 2018, during the second game of Minnesota United FC's season, Molino tore his left ACL in a match against Orlando City FC after scoring two goals in the first game of the season.

Following Minnesota's 2020 season, Molino's contract expired. On 16 December 2020, Molino announced that he would not be rejoining Minnesota United.

=== Columbus Crew ===
On 7 January 2021, Columbus Crew announced the signing of Molino for the 2021 Major League Soccer season.

On 26 August 2021, it was announced that Molino had torn his right ACL, his second ACL tear in his right knee and third total in his MLS career.

=== Defence Force ===
In October 2024, Molino signed with, and was named captain of TT Pro League club Defence Force. He scored a hat-trick in a match versus AC Port of Spain, and in the following match scored a second hat-trick, this time versus Morvant Caledonia United.

== International career ==
Molino has represented Trinidad and Tobago at international level. He was named in Trinidad's 2010 Caribbean Cup squad, and made his international debut versus Guyana on 4 November 2010. He announced his retirement from international duty on 1 September 2023, but returned to play in late 2024 in the team's 2–2 tie versus Cuba in the 2024–25 CONCACAF Nations League.

== Personal ==
In early 2015, Molino received his U.S. green card which qualifies him as a domestic player for MLS roster purposes. His brother, Kevon Cooper is a cricketer from Trinidad and Tobago. He has played for Trinidad and Tobago and Leeward Islands as well as for Rajasthan Royals in the Indian Premier League and in various other Twenty20 leagues around the world.

== Career statistics ==
=== Club ===
As of 9 June 2024

Appearances and goals by club, season and competition
Club	Season	League			National cup		League cup		Continental		Total	
Club	Season	Division	Apps	Goals	Apps	Goals	Apps	Goals	Apps	Goals	Apps	Goals
Ma Pau SC	2010–11	TT Pro League	4	0	—		1	0	—		5	0
Ma Pau SC	Total		4	0	—		1	0	—		5	0
Orlando City	2011	USL	24	2	1	1	—		—		25	3
Orlando City	2012	USL	24	2	1	1	—		—		25	3
Orlando City	2013	USL	18	2	3	0	—		—		18	2
Orlando City	2014	USL	28	20	2	2	—		—		30	22
Orlando City	2015	MLS	7	0	—		—		—		7	0
Orlando City	2016	MLS	30	11	2	1	—		—		32	12
Orlando City	Total		131	37	9	5	—		—		140	42
Minnesota United	2017	MLS	30	7	—		—		—		30	7
Minnesota United	2018	MLS	2	2	—		—		—		2	2
Minnesota United	2019	MLS	17	3	3	0	1	0	—		21	3
Minnesota United	2020	MLS	18	9	—		3	4	—		21	13
Minnesota United	Total		67	21	3	0	1	0	—		74	25
Columbus Crew	2021	MLS	11	1	0	0	—		0	0	11	1
Columbus Crew	2022	MLS	11	1	0	0	—		—		11	1
Columbus Crew	2023	MLS	14	0	0	0	—		—		14	0
Columbus Crew	Total		36	2	0	0	0	0	—		22	2
Career total			228	60	12	5	2	0	0	0	241	69

=== International ===
As of match played 18 November 2025

Appearances and goals by national team and year
National team	Year	Apps	Goals
Trinidad and Tobago	2010	4	0
Trinidad and Tobago	2011	4	1
Trinidad and Tobago	2012	7	2
Trinidad and Tobago	2013	7	2
Trinidad and Tobago	2014	7	7
Trinidad and Tobago	2015	1	0
Trinidad and Tobago	2016	5	4
Trinidad and Tobago	2017	8	3
Trinidad and Tobago	2019	7	2
Trinidad and Tobago	2021	5	2
Trinidad and Tobago	2022	2	0
Trinidad and Tobago	2023	3	0
Trinidad and Tobago	2024	2	0
Trinidad and Tobago	2025	13	4
Total		75	27

Scores and results list Trinidad and Tobago's goal tally first.

List of international goals scored by Kevin Molino
No.	Date	Venue	Opponent	Score	Result	Competition
1.	7 October 2011	Bermuda National Stadium, Hamilton, Bermuda	Bermuda	1–2	1–2	2014 FIFA World Cup qualification
2.	22 January 2012	Hasley Crawford Stadium, Port of Spain, Trinidad and Tobago	Finland	2–1	2–3	Friendly
3.	11 December 2012	Antigua Recreation Ground, St. John's, Antigua and Barbuda	Dominican Republic	2–1	2–1	2012 Caribbean Cup
4.	15 July 2013	BBVA Compass Stadium, Houston, United States	Honduras	2–0	2–0	2013 CONCACAF Gold Cup
5.	5 September 2013	King Fahd International Stadium, Riyadh, Saudi Arabia	United Arab Emirates	3–3	3–3	2013 OSN Cup
6.	8 October 2014	Ato Boldon Stadium, Couva, Trinidad and Tobago	Dominican Republic	1–0	6–1	2014 Caribbean Cup qualification
7.	8 October 2014	Ato Boldon Stadium, Couva, Trinidad and Tobago	Dominican Republic	2–0	6–1	2014 Caribbean Cup qualification
8.	8 October 2014	Ato Boldon Stadium, Couva, Trinidad and Tobago	Dominican Republic	3–0	6–1	2014 Caribbean Cup qualification
9.	12 October 2014	Ato Boldon Stadium, Couva, Trinidad and Tobago	Antigua and Barbuda	1–0	1–0	2014 Caribbean Cup qualification
10.	11 November 2014	Montego Bay Sports Complex, Montego Bay, Jamaica	Curaçao	3–2	3–2	2014 Caribbean Cup
11.	13 November 2014	Montego Bay Sports Complex, Montego Bay, Jamaica	French Guiana	1–0	4–2	2014 Caribbean Cup
12.	13 November 2014	Montego Bay Sports Complex, Montego Bay, Jamaica	French Guiana	2–0	4–2	2014 Caribbean Cup
13.	29 March 2016	Hasley Crawford Stadium, Port of Spain, Trinidad and Tobago	Saint Vincent and the Grenadines	4–0	6–0	2018 FIFA World Cup qualification
14.	5 October 2016	Ato Boldon Stadium, Couva, Trinidad and Tobago	Dominican Republic	1–0	4–0	2017 Caribbean Cup qualification
15.	5 October 2016	Ato Boldon Stadium, Couva, Trinidad and Tobago	Dominican Republic	2–0	4–0	2017 Caribbean Cup qualification
16.	5 October 2016	Ato Boldon Stadium, Couva, Trinidad and Tobago	Dominican Republic	4–0	4–0	2017 Caribbean Cup qualification
17.	24 March 2017	Hasley Crawford Stadium, Port of Spain, Trinidad and Tobago	Panama	1–0	1–0	2018 FIFA World Cup qualification
18.	12 June 2017	Estadio Nacional de Costa Rica, San José, Costa Rica	Costa Rica	1–1	1–2	2018 FIFA World Cup qualification
19.	11 November 2017	Ato Boldon Stadium, Couva, Trinidad and Tobago	Grenada	2–2	2–2	Friendly
20.	26 June 2019	Children's Mercy Park, Kansas City, United States	Guyana	1–1	1–1	2019 CONCACAF Gold Cup
21.	9 September 2019	Hasley Crawford Stadium, Port of Spain, Trinidad and Tobago	Martinique	1–0	2–2	2019–20 CONCACAF Nations League A
22.	2 July 2021	DRV PNK Stadium, Fort Lauderdale, United States	Montserrat	1–0	6–1	2021 CONCACAF Gold Cup qualification
23.	6 July 2021	DRV PNK Stadium, Fort Lauderdale, United States	French Guiana	1–0	1–1	2021 CONCACAF Gold Cup qualification
24.	23 March 2025	Ato Boldon Stadium, Couva, Trinidad and Tobago	Cuba	3–0	4–0	2025 CONCACAF Gold Cup qualification
25.	28 May 2025	Brentford Community Stadium, London, England	Jamaica	2–2	2–3	2025 Unity Cup

== Honours ==
Orlando City

- USL Pro Cup: 2011, 2013
- Commissioner's Cup: 2011, 2012, 2014

Columbus Crew

- MLS Cup: 2023

Defence Force

- TT Premier Football League: 2024–25, 2025–26

Trinidad and Tobago

- Caribbean Cup runner-up: 2014

Individual

- USL Pro MVP: 2012, 2014
- USL Pro Team of the Season: 2014
- USL Pro single-season goal scoring record: 20 (2014)
- USL Pro single-season points record: 49 (2014)
- Caribbean Cup top scorer: 2014 (joint with Darren Mattocks and Kervens Belfort)
