= José Leitón =

Costa Rican footballer (born 1993)

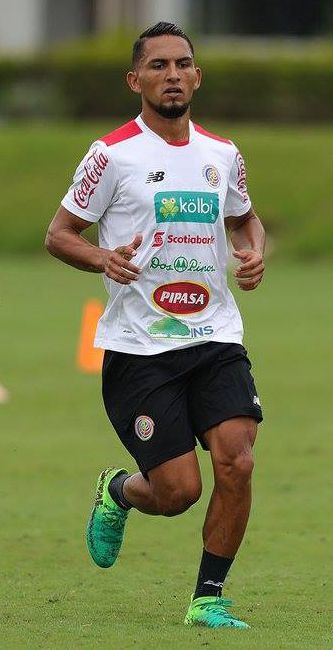

Personal information
- Full name: José Martín Leitón Rodríguez
- Date of birth: 6 August 1993 (age 33)
- Place of birth: Moravia, San José, Costa Rica
- Height: 1.74 m (5 ft 9 in)
- Position: Left midfielder

Team information
- Current team: Municipal Grecia
- Number: 77

Senior career*
Years	Team	Apps	(Gls)
2012–2015	CS Uruguay	14	(0)
2015	Puntarenas		
2016	CS Uruguay	17	(1)
2016–2019	Herediano	43	(3)
2017–2018	→ Minnesota United (loan)	1	(0)
2020–	Municipal Grecia	14	(2)

International career^{‡}
2017–	Costa Rica	1	(0)
- * Club domestic league appearances and goals as of 11 February 2021 (UTC) ‡ National team caps and goals as of 10 August 2017

José Martín Leitón Rodríguez (born 6 August 1993) is a Costa Rican footballer who plays for Municipal Grecia.

== Career ==
=== Beginnings ===
Leitón grew up in Moravia, Costa Rica. He had no formal football education so he learned how to play in the street. After a strong performance in an amateur tournament in San Jerónimo de Moravia Leitón's brother managed to get him a trial with Deportivo Saprissa. Leitón did not know how to run the drills for the club and he was corrected repeatedly by the coach. The coaches at Saprissa told Leitón that they would call him back in a few days about with their decision. In this time, Leitón decided to ride his bike to Coronado, Costa Rica to try out for C.S. Uruguay de Coronado. After a week, the coaches at C.S. Uruguay told Leitón to go to the club's office to sign a contract. A few days later, Saprissa's youth coach called Leitón to ask him to sign a contract but he turned them down as he had already signed with C.S. Uruguay.

=== Club ===
On 10 August 2017 it was announced that Leitón was to be loaned from C.S. Herediano in the Primera División de Costa Rica to Minnesota United in Major League Soccer through 10 July 2018.

=== International ===
In June 2017 Leitón was chosen the preliminary 40-man roster for Costa Rica's 2017 CONCACAF Gold Cup squad. He was not selected by Óscar Ramírez to participate in the group stage of that tournament, however, he was called up to join the squad for the knockout stage. Leitón earned his first cap for the national team in their 0–2 defeat against the United States in the semi-finals.
