= Jérôme Thiesson =

Swiss footballer (born 1987)

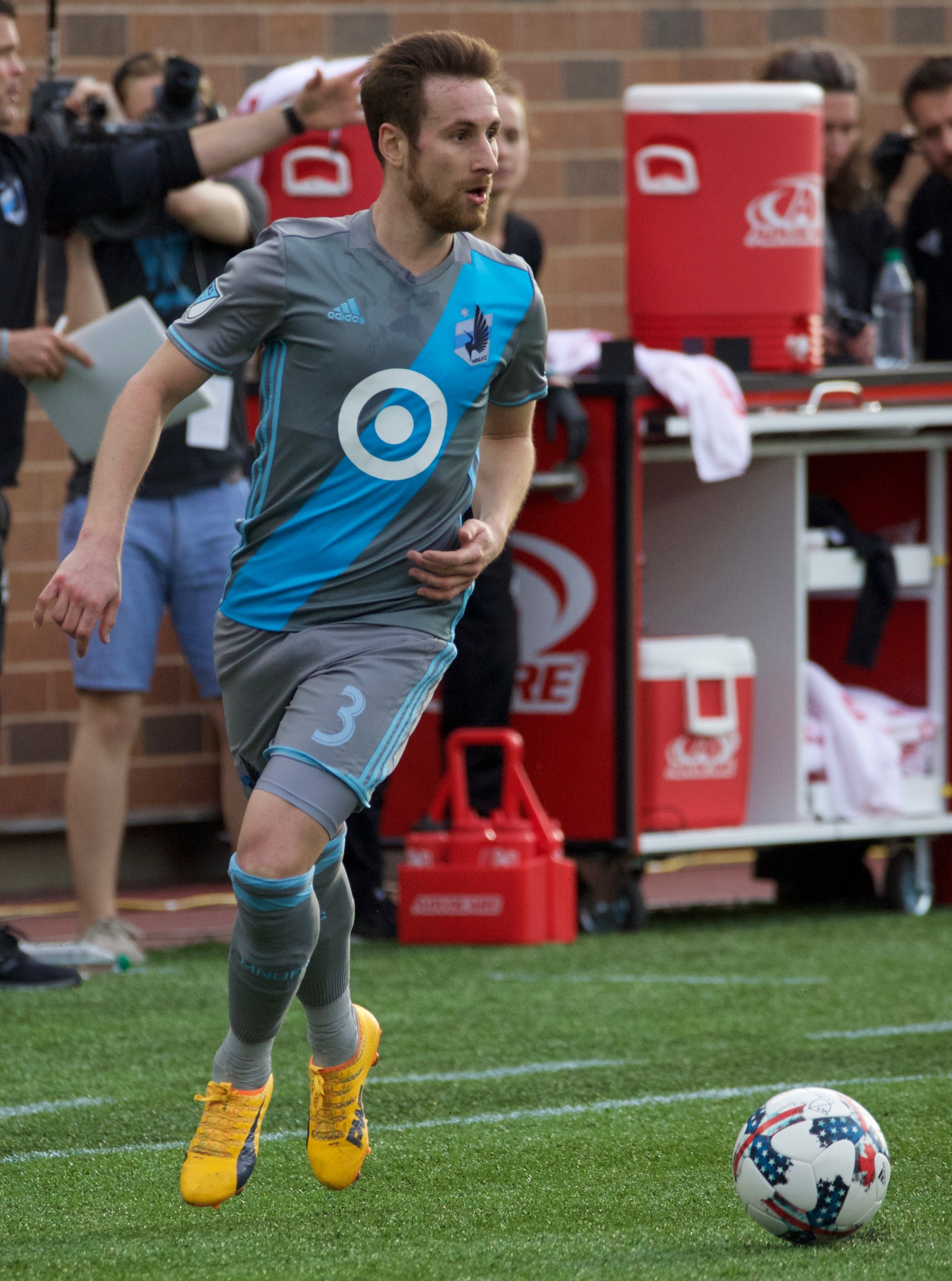
- Thiesson playing for Minnesota United in 2017

Personal information
- Date of birth: 6 August 1987 (age 39)
- Place of birth: Switzerland
- Height: 1.76 m (5 ft 9 1/2 in)
- Position: Full back

Team information
- Current team: FC Mutschellen (manager)

Senior career*
Years	Team	Apps	(Gls)
2006–2007	Zürich	0	(0)
2007–2008	FC Wil	44	(2)
2008–2011	AC Bellinzona	77	(1)
2011–2017	Luzern	98	(1)
2017–2018	Minnesota United	47	(2)
2019	Rapperswil-Jona	12	(0)
2019–2022	Aarau	70	(1)

International career
2007	Switzerland U-21	1	(0)

Managerial career
- 2022–: FC Mutschellen
- * Club domestic league appearances and goals

Jérôme Thiesson (born 6 August 1987) is a Swiss football coach and a former player. He was manager of FC Mutschellen in the fifth-tier 2. Liga Interregional, joined FC Aarau as head of operations in 2024 and became their U15 coach for two years.

== Career ==
In January 2011 Thiesson agreed to a contract to join FC Luzern as of summer 2011.

In February 2017 Thiesson agreed to a contract to join Minnesota United FC as of winter 2017. Thiesson was released by Minnesota at the end of their 2018 season.

In January 2019 Thiesson agreed to a contract to join FC Rapperswil-Jona for the remainder of the 2018-2019 season. However, already on 20 May 2019, FC Aarau announced that they had signed Thiesson from the upcoming 2019/20 season.
