= List of Minnesota United FC players =

This list comprises all players who have participated in at least one league match for the Minnesota United FC since the team's first Major League Soccer season in 2017. Players who were on the roster but never appeared in a regular season game are not listed.

== Players ==
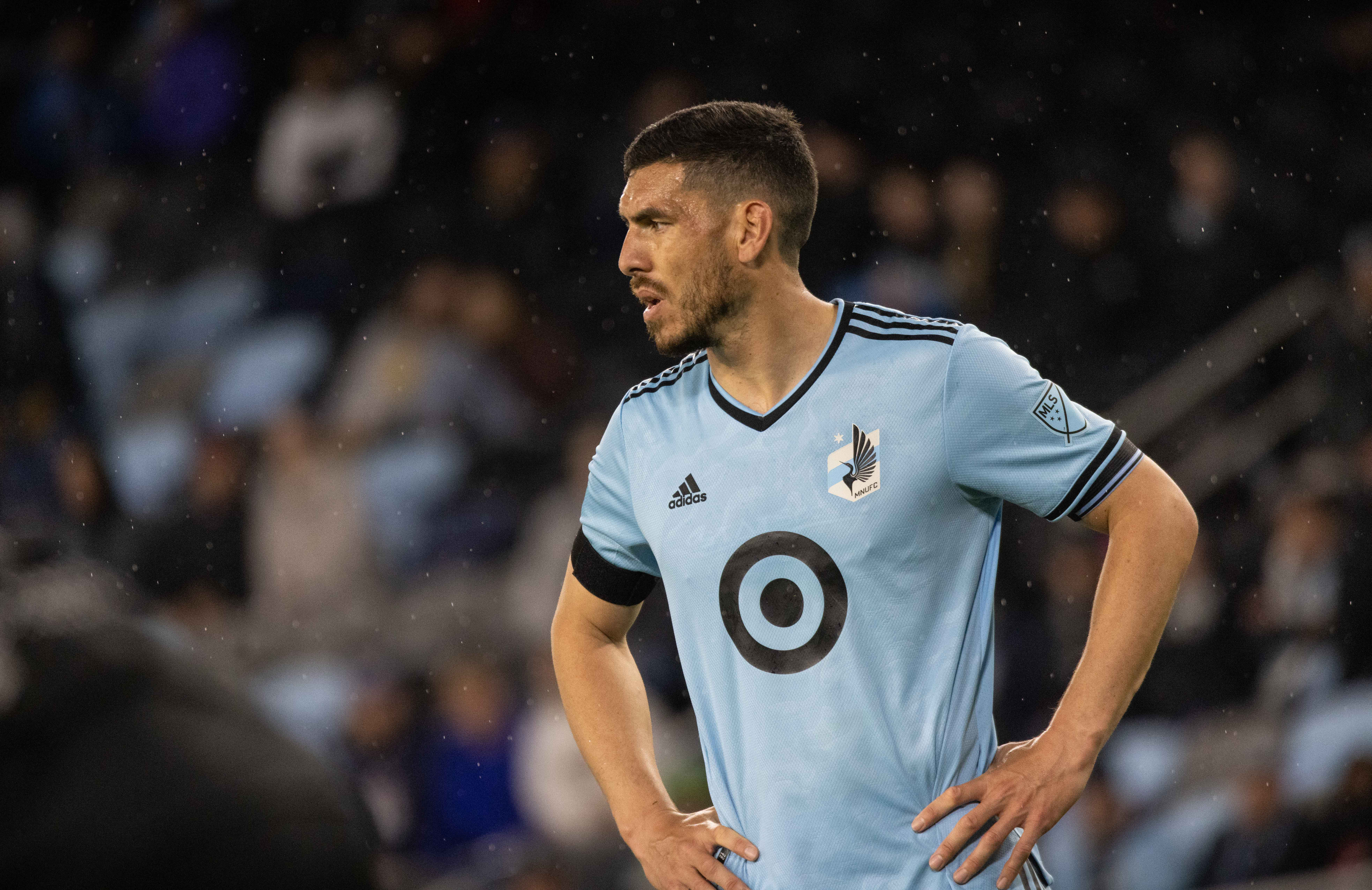
Michael Boxall has the most appearances as a player for Minnesota United and is the current Captain for Minnesota United, a role he has held since 2024.

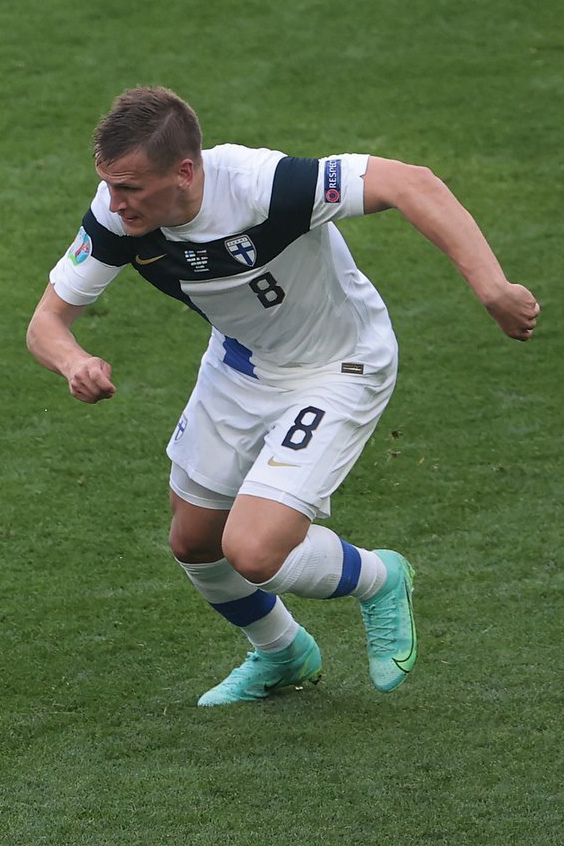
Robin Lod is the top goalscorer and has the most assists for Minnesota United.

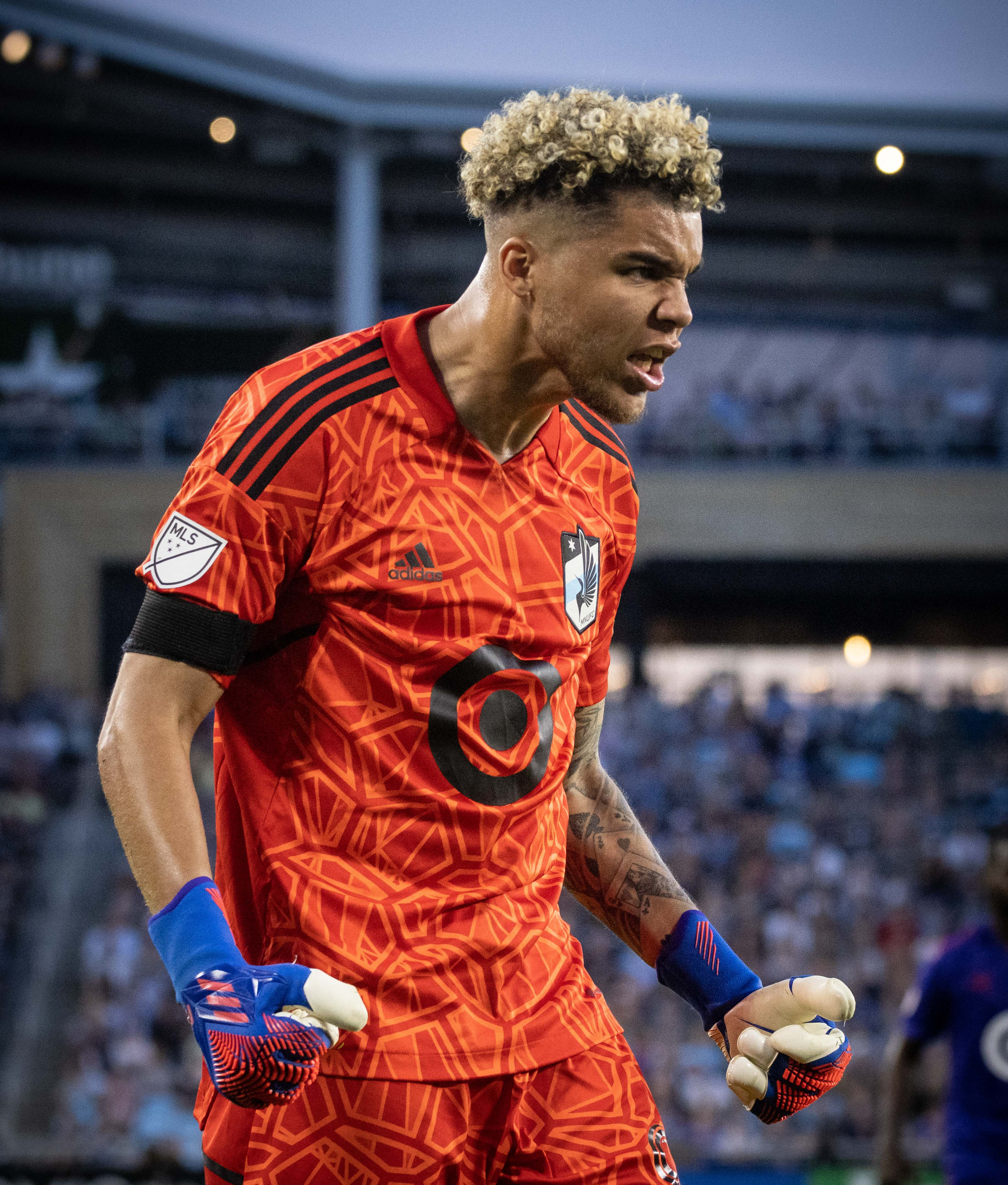
Dayne St. Clair has the most appearances for Minnesota United as a goalkeeper and has kept the most clean sheets.

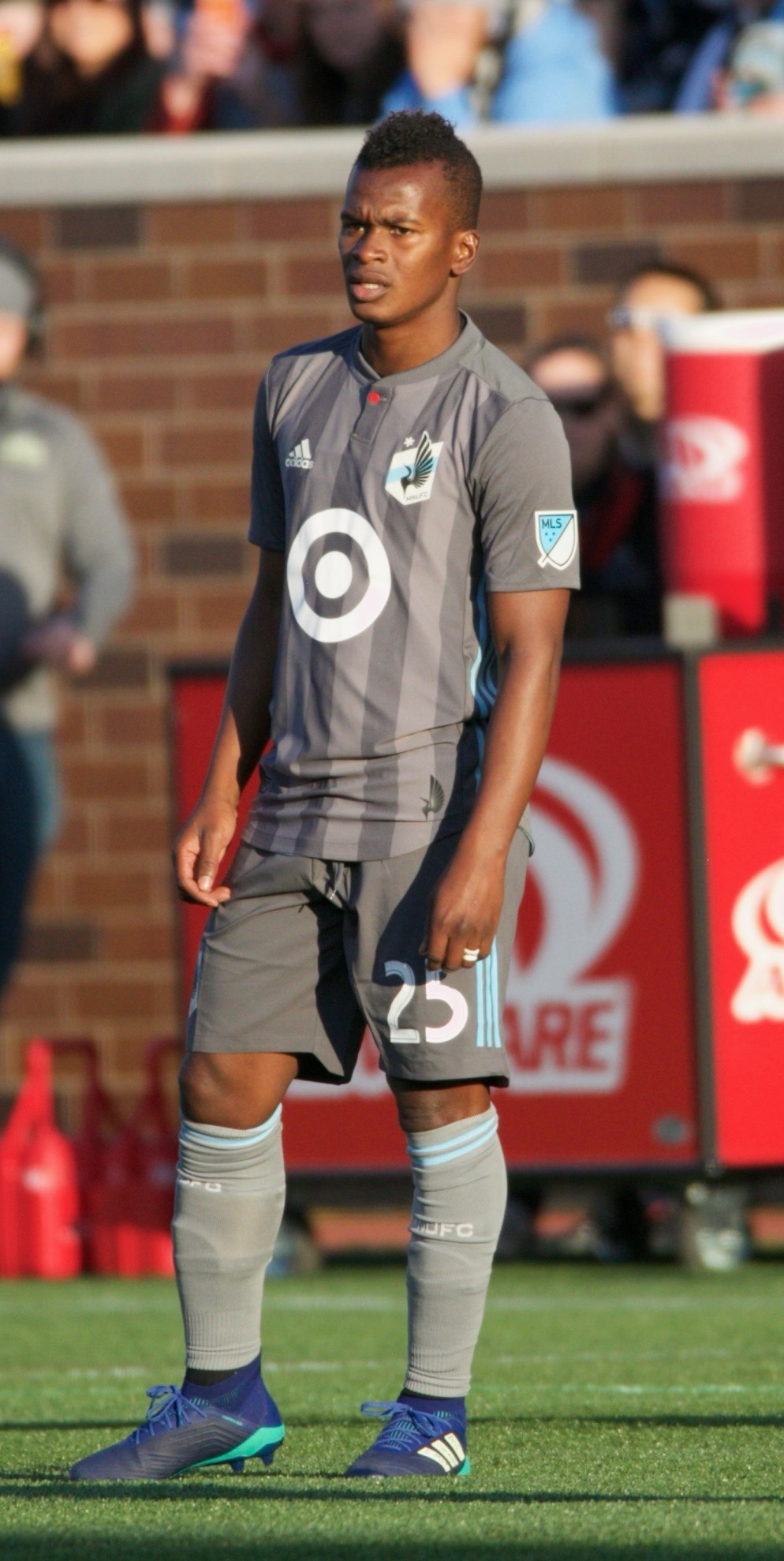
Darwin Quintero was the first Designated Player in club history.

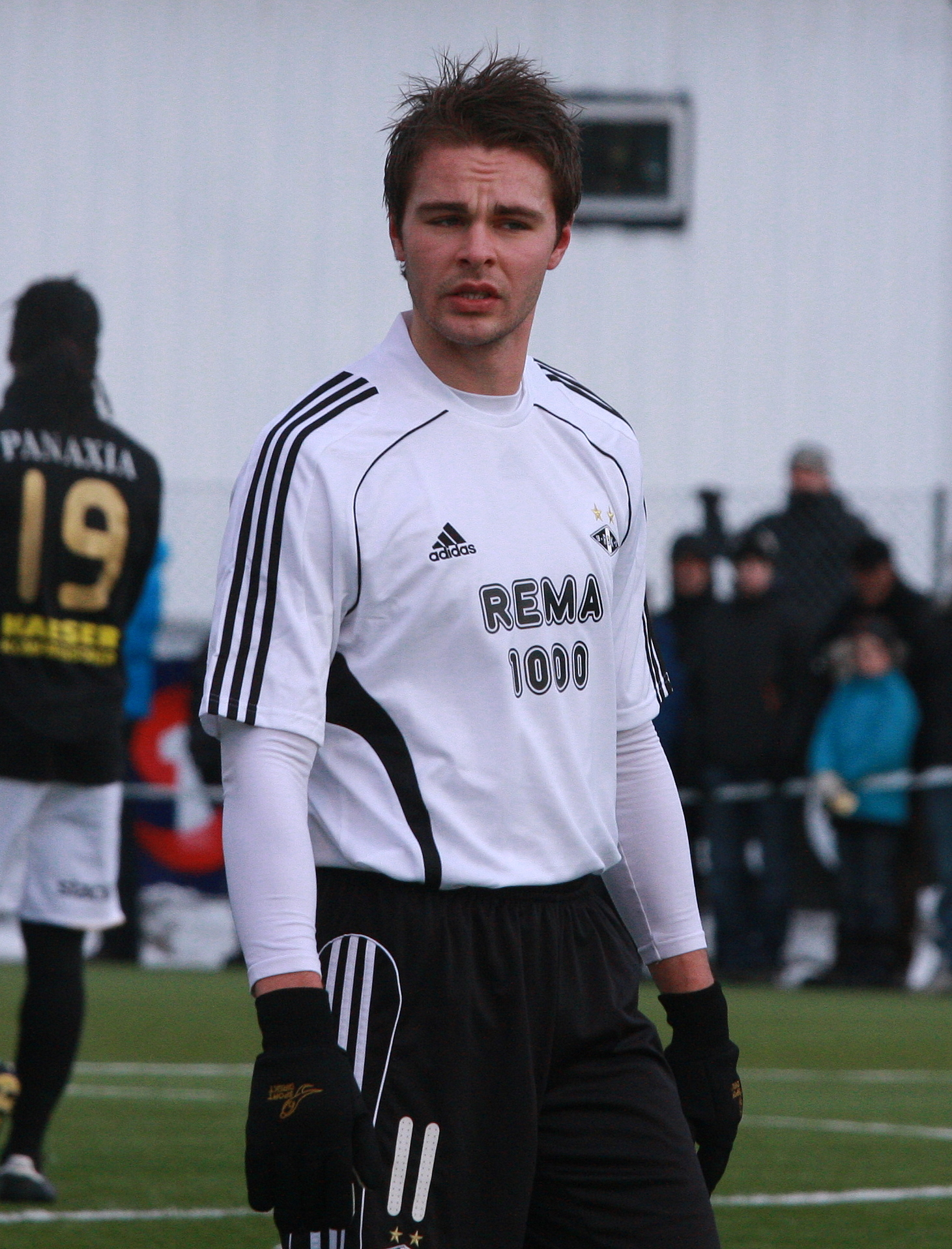
Vadim Demidov (here pictured on Rosenborg BK) was the first Captain in club history, in 2017.

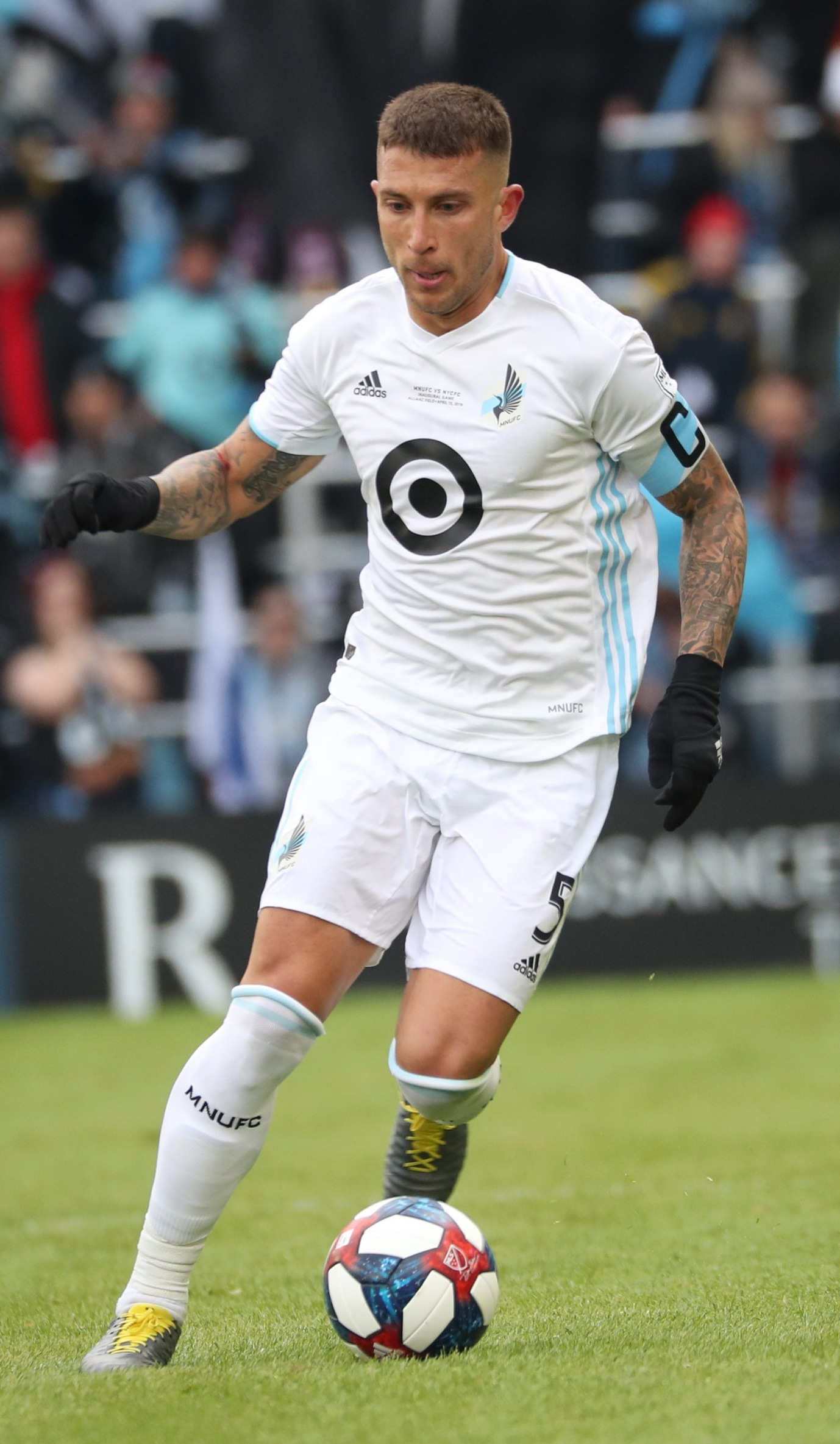
Francisco Calvo was the second Captain in club history, from 2017 to 2019.

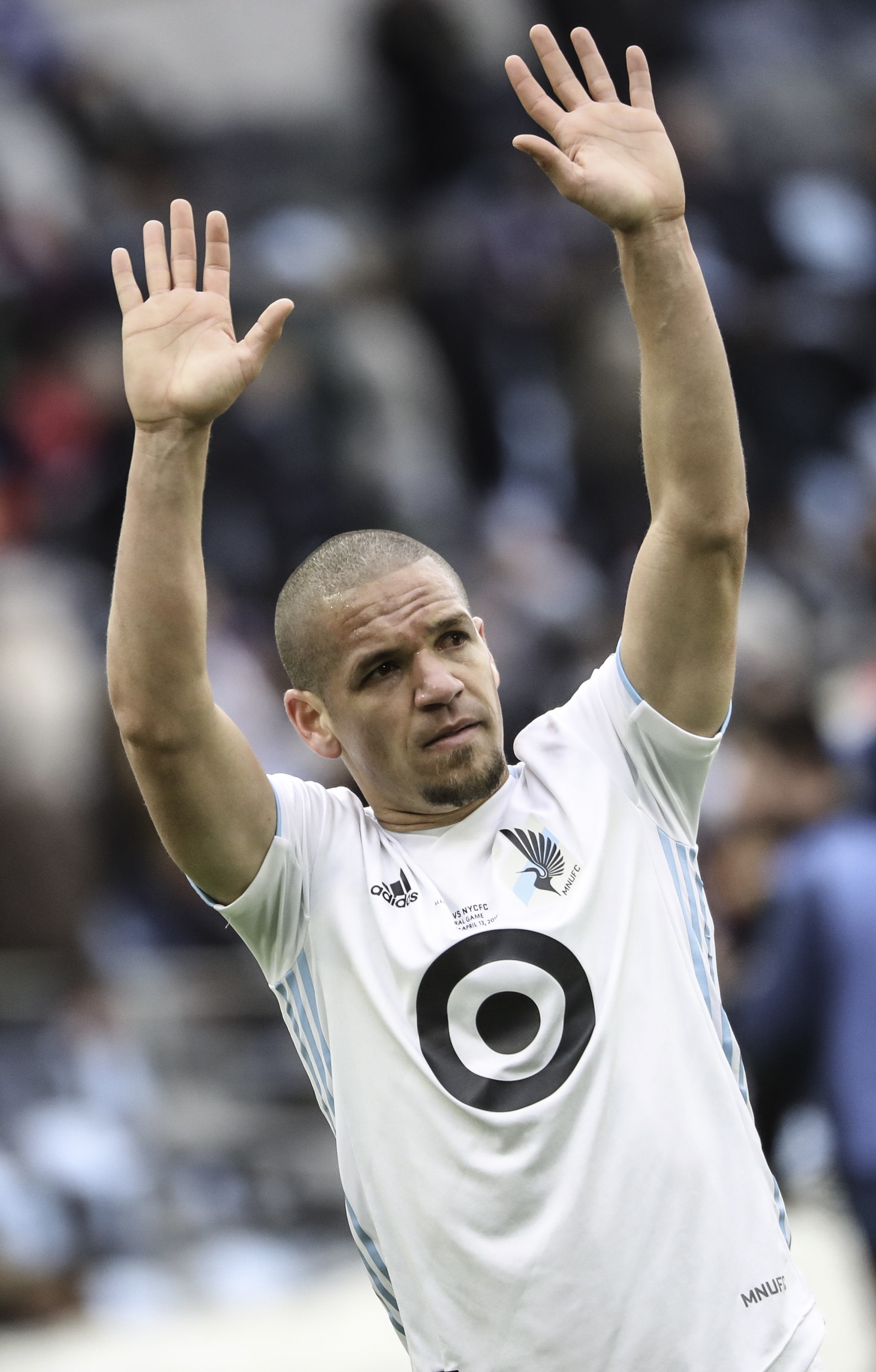
Ozzie Alonso was the third Captain in club history, from 2019 to 2021.

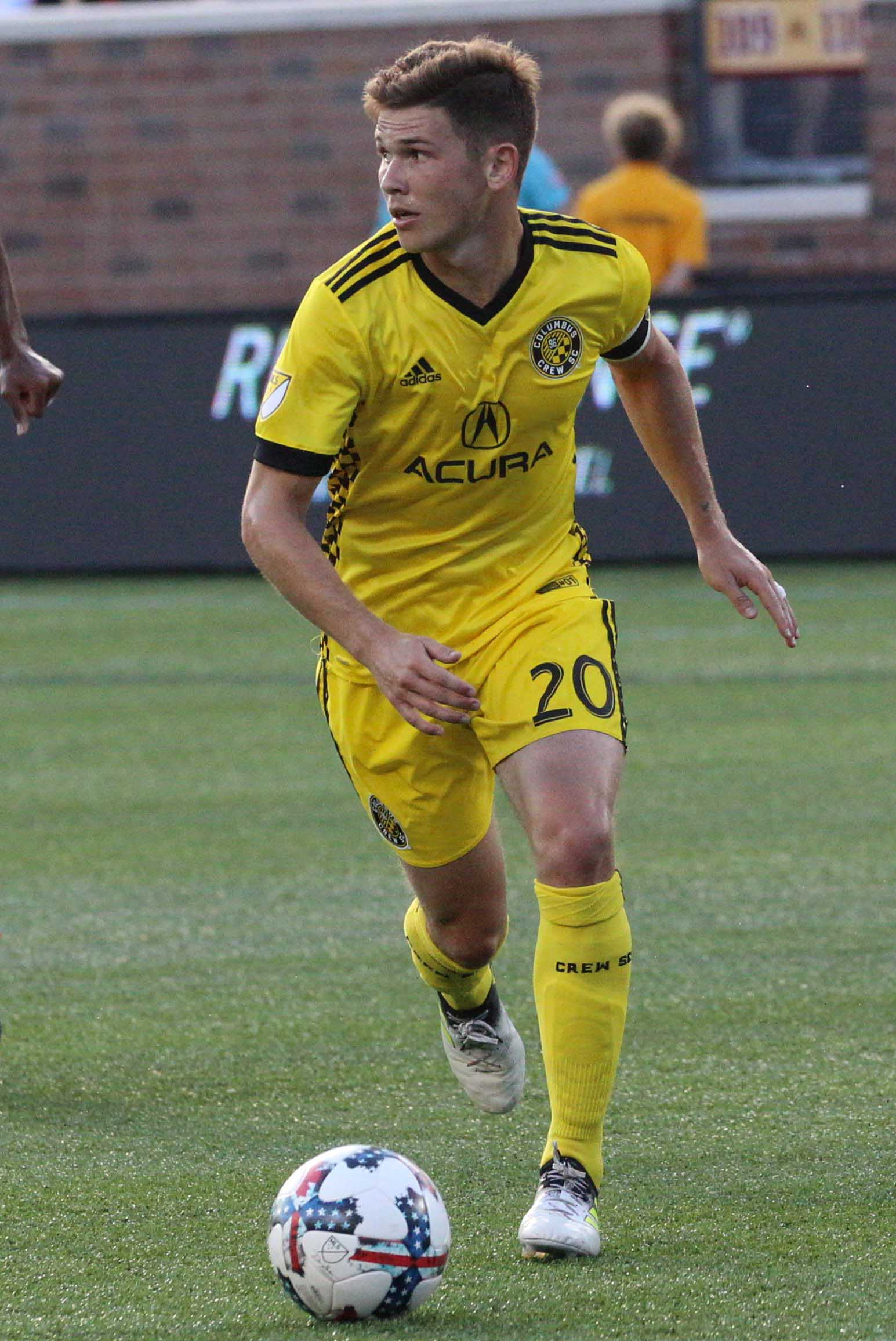
Wil Trapp (here pictured on Columbus Crew) was the fourth Captain in club history, from 2022 to 2023.

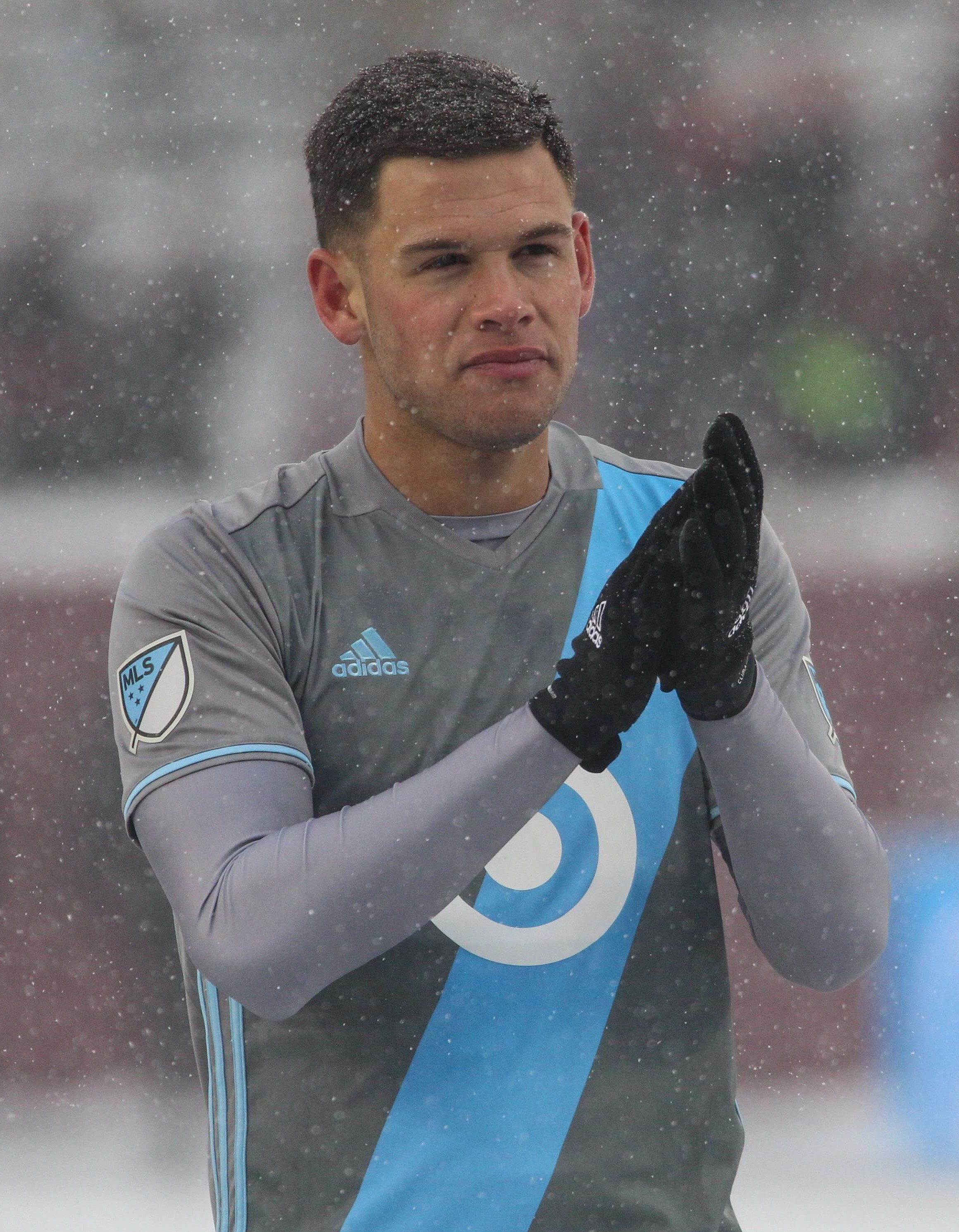
Christian Ramirez was the first goalscorer in the club's MLS history and has also scored the most MLS goals in a single season. He is also one of 7 players who played for Minnesota United in both their NASL and MLS iterations.

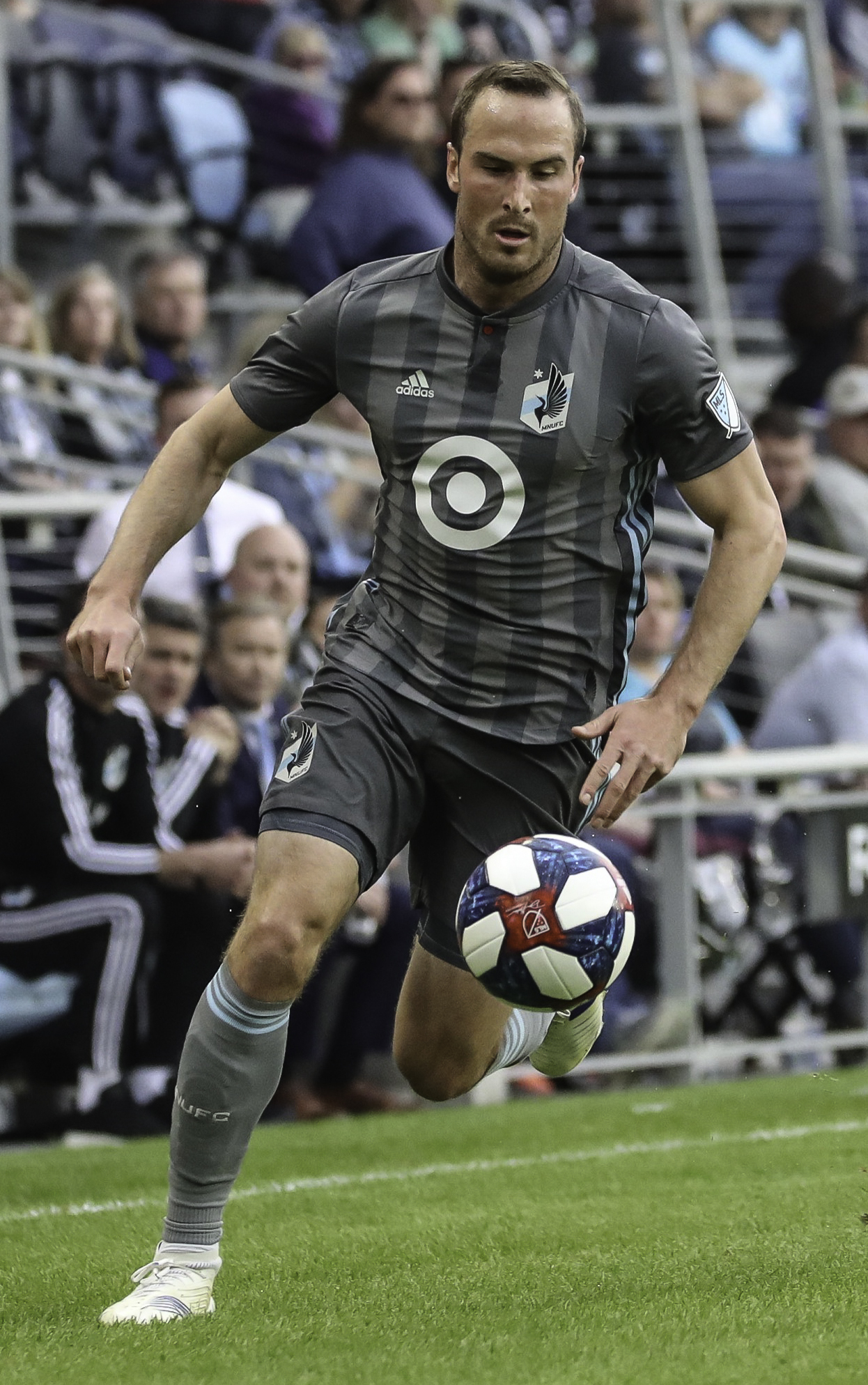
Brent Kallman is one of 7 players who played for Minnesota United in both their NASL and MLS iterations.

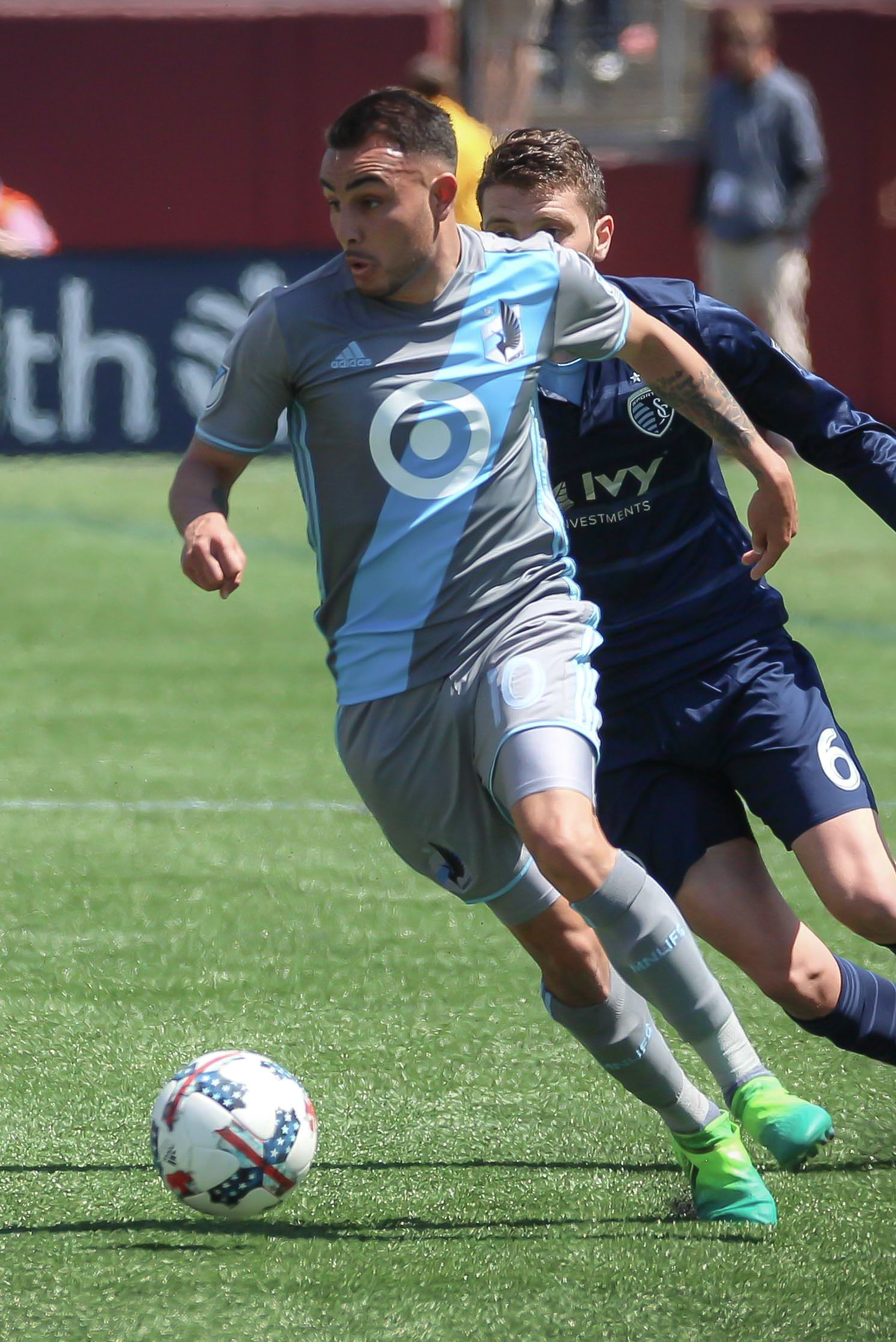
Miguel Ibarra is one of 7 players who played for Minnesota United in both their NASL and MLS iterations.

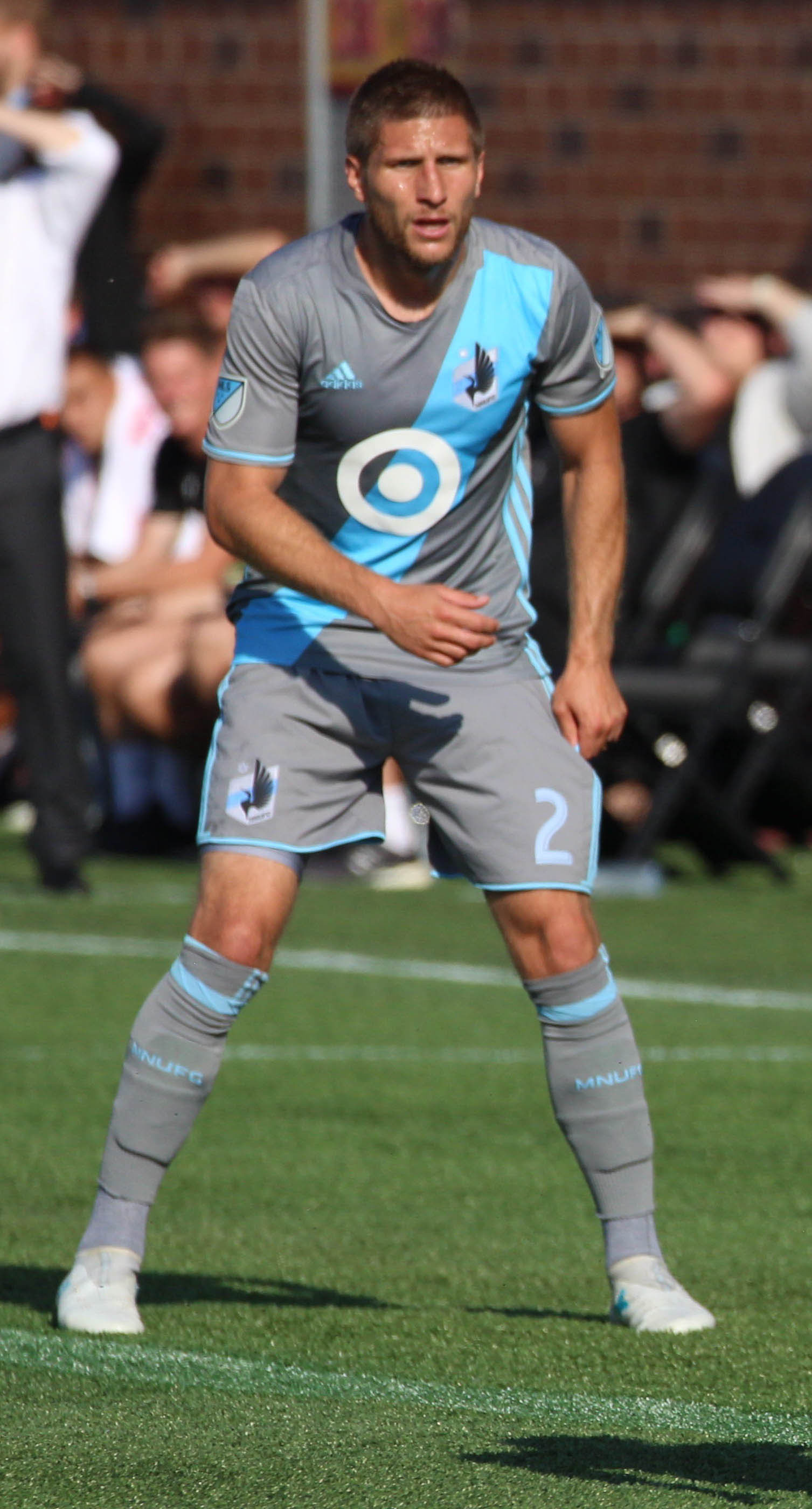
Justin Davis is one of 7 players who played for Minnesota United in both their NASL and MLS iterations.

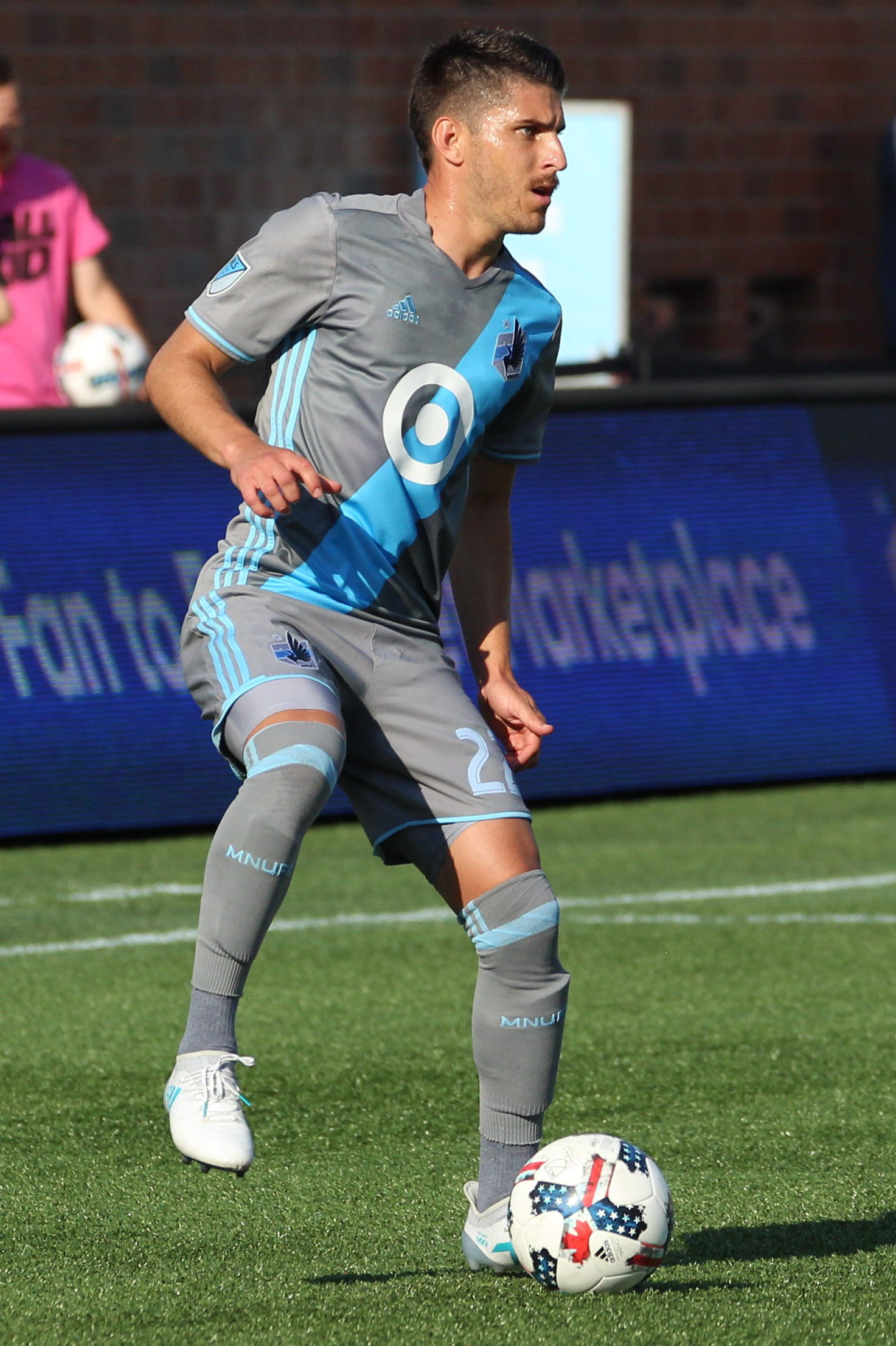
Kevin Venegas is one of 7 players who played for Minnesota United in both their NASL and MLS iterations.

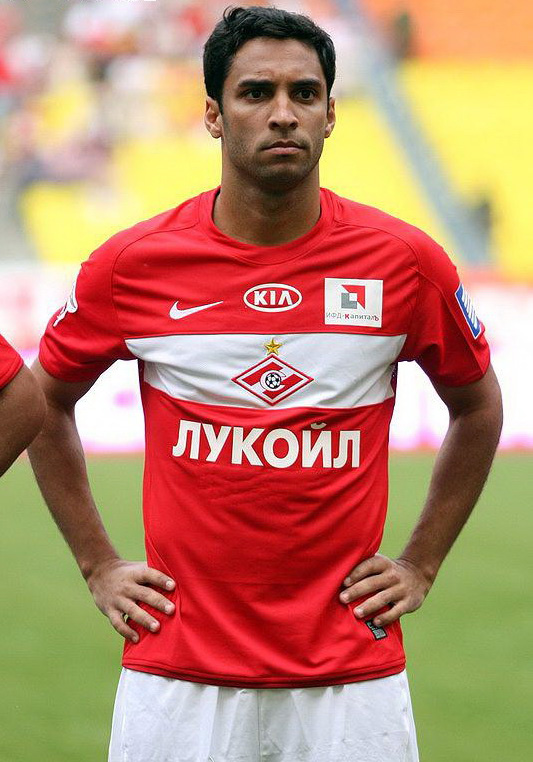
Ibson (here pictured on FC Spartak Moscow) is one of 7 players who played for Minnesota United in both their NASL and MLS iterations.

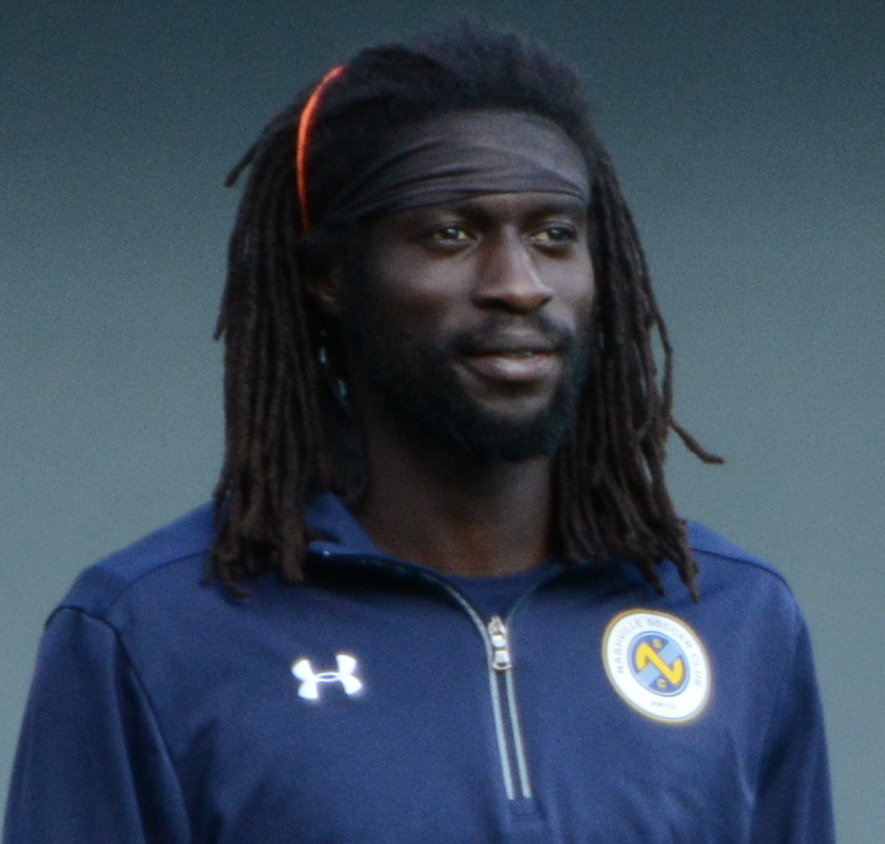
Ismaila Jome (here pictured on Nashville SC) is one of 7 players who played for Minnesota United in both their NASL and MLS iterations.

As of August 29th, 2026

Note: Bold indicates current Minnesota United Player

Name	Position	Nationality	Years	Games	Goals	Assists	Source
Ramón Ábila	FW	Argentina	2021	10	2	0	
**Jordan Adebayo-Smith**	FW	(United States) USA	2024-	11	0	1	
Fanendo Adi	FW	Nigeria	2021	10	1	1	
Juan Agudelo	FW	(United States) USA	2021	13	0	0	
José Aja	DF	Uruguay	2020	13	1	0	
Brandon Allen	FW	(United States) USA	2017	1	0	0	
Osvaldo Alonso	MF	Cuba	2019-2021	61	3	3	
Luis Amarilla	FW	Paraguay	2020; 2022-2023	53	13	6	
Kervin Arriaga	MF	Honduras	2022-2024	57	6	3	
Hugo Bacharach	DF	Spain	2024	1	0	0	
Zaydan Bello	MF	Australia	2023	1	0	0	
Alan Benítez	DF	Paraguay	2022	11	1	2	
Noah Billingsley	DF	New Zealand	2020-2021	1	0	0	
**Michael Boxall**	DF	New Zealand	2017-	257	8	9	
Alejandro Bran	MF	Costa Rica	2024-2025	11	1	0	
Ethan Bristow	DF	Saint Kitts and Nevis	2023-2024	9	0	0	
Marc Burch	DF	(United States) USA	2017-2018	21	0	0	
**Marcus Caldeira**	FW	Canada	2026-	5	2	1	
Francisco Calvo	DF	Costa Rica	2017-2019	60	5	4	
Thomás Chacón	MF	Uruguay	2019-2022	6	0	0	
**Tomás Chancalay**	FW	Argentina	2026-	22	2	4	
**Kieran Chandler**	DF	(United States) USA	2025-	2	0	0	
Caden Clark	MF	(United States) USA	2024	23	0	1	
Sam Cronin	MF	(United States) USA	2017-2018	18	0	1	
Abu Danladi	FW	Ghana	2017-2019; 2022	86	13	6	
Justin Davis	DF	(United States) USA	2017	8	0	0	
Vadim Demidov	DF	Norway	2017	3	0	0	
**Jefferson Díaz**	DF	Colombia	2024-	56	0	6	
Bakaye Dibassy	DF	Mali	2020-2023	71	2	1	
**Mamadou Dieng**	FW	Senegal	2025-	22	0	0	
Hassani Dotson	MF	(United States) USA	2019-2025	149	17	14	
**Morris Duggan**	DF	Germany	2024-	45	1	1	
Cameron Dunbar	MF	(United States) USA	2023	3	0	0	
**Kyle Duncan**	DF	(United States) USA	2026-	18	1	4	
Raheem Edwards	FW	Canada	2020	12	0	3	
Victor Eriksson	DF	Sweden	2024	4	0	0	
Luiz Fernando	MF	Brazil	2018	11	0	0	
Fernando Bob	MF	Brazil	2018	7	0	1	
Ethan Finlay	MF	(United States) USA	2017-2021	95	19	12	
Oniel Fisher	DF	Jamaica	2022	11	0	0	
**Dominik Fitz**	MF	Austria	2025-	6	0	0	
Franco Fragapane	FW	Argentina	2021-2024	97	14	18	
Ménder García	FW	Colombia	2022-2023	39	4	2	
Chase Gasper	DF	(United States) USA	2019-2022	63	2	1	
**Owen Gene**	MF	France	2025-	43	0	4	
Alexi Gómez	MF	Peru	2018	18	0	0	
Jonathan González	MF	Mexico	2022	8	1	0	
**Mauricio González**	FW	(Colombia) Columbia	2026-	12	2	0	
Joseph Greenspan	DF	(United States) USA	2017	4	0	0	
Ján Greguš	MF	Slovakia	2019-2021; 2023	75	3	18	
**Julian Gressel**	MF	(United States) USA	2025-	25	1	3	
Marlon Hairston	MF	(United States) USA	2020	9	0	0	
Niko Hansen	MF	Denmark	2021-2022	17	1	2	
**Carlos Harvey**	MF/DF	Panama	2024-	51	2	2	
Jacori Hayes	MF	(United States) USA	2020-2022	34	1	2	
Harrison Heath	MF	England	2018	4	0	0	
**Luke Hille**	FW	(United States) USA	2025-	1	0	0	
**Bongokuhle Hlongwane**	FW	South Africa	2022-	140	24	14	
Adrien Hunou	MF	France	2021-2022	35	7	2	
Miguel Ibarra	MF	(United States) USA	2017-2019	84	11	14	
Romario Ibarra	MF	Ecuador	2018-2020	17	5	1	
Ibson	MF	Brazil	2017-2018	58	4	9	
Emmanuel Iwe	MF	Nigeria	2023	3	0	0	
**Aziel Jackson**	MF	(United States) USA	2021-2022; 2026-	1	0	0	
**Jeong Ho-yeon**	MF	South Korea	2025-	4	0	0	
Jeong Sang-bin	FW	South Korea	2023-2025	70	7	3	
Ismaila Jome	MF	(The Gambia) Gambia	2017	12	0	0	
Bashkim Kadrii	MF	Denmark	2017	11	0	0	
Brent Kallman	DF	(United States) USA	2017-2023	114	6	1	
Kei Kamara	FW	Sierra Leone	2020	7	1	1	
Nabilai Kibunguchy	DF	Kenya	2021-2022	2	0	0	
Foster Langsdorf	FW	(United States) USA	2020-2021	2	0	0	
Kemar Lawrence	DF	Jamaica	2022-2023	41	1	2	
José Leitón	MF	Costa Rica	2017-2018	1	0	0	
Robin Lod	MF	Finland	2019-2025	158	34	35	
Carter Manley	DF	(United States) USA	2018-2019	9	0	1	
**Anthony Markanich**	DF	(United States) USA	2024-	55	15	4	
Mikael Marqués	DF	Sweden	2023-2024	1	0	0	
Collin Martin	MF	(United States) USA	2017-2019	26	0	3	
Justin McMaster	FW	Jamaica	2021-2022	7	0	1	
Tyrone Mears	DF	England	2018	11	1	0	
Loïc Mesanvi	FW/MF	Togo	2024-2025	5	0	0	
Romain Métanire	DF	Madagascar	2019-2022	77	1	13	
Eric Miller	DF	(United States) USA	2018-2019	24	0	1	
Wilfried Moimbé	DF	France	2019	4	0	0	
Kevin Molino	MF	Trinidad and Tobago	2017-2020	67	21	18	
James Musa	MF	New Zealand	2020	6	0	0	
Sam Nicholson	MF	Scotland	2017-2018	20	2	2	
Moses Nyeman	MF	(United States) USA	2024	4	0	0	
Rory O'Driscoll	MF	(United States) USA	2024	1	0	0	
Lawrence Olum	DF	Kenya	2019	10	0	1	
Tani Oluwaseyi	FW	Canada	2022-2025	51	18	14	
Wyatt Omsberg	DF	(United States) USA	2018-2020	7	0	0	
Ike Opara	DF	(United States) USA	2019-2021	32	5	1	
**Devin Padelford**	DF	(United States) USA	2021-	52	2	2	
Frantz Pangop	MF	Cameroon	2018	9	0	0	
**Joaquín Pereyra**	MF	Argentina	2024-	62	9	22	
Teemu Pukki	FW	Finland	2023-2024	35	14	0	
**Troy Putt**	FW	New Zealand	2026-	1	0	0	
Darwin Quintero	FW	Colombia	2018-2019	57	21	20	
Jukka Raitala	DF	Finland	2021	9	0	0	
Christian Ramirez	FW	(United States) USA	2017-2018	50	21	5	
**Darius Randell**	FW	Liberia	2025-	4	0	0	
Emanuel Reynoso	MF	Argentina	2020-2024	90	22	33	
Ángelo Rodríguez	FW	Colombia	2018-2019	39	9	3	
James Rodríguez	MF	Colombia	2026	6	0	2	
**Kage Romanshyn Jr.**	MF	(United States) USA	2024-	1	0	0	
**Nicolás Romero**	DF	Argentina	2025-	36	0	6	
Joseph Rosales	MF	Honduras	2021-2025	103	2	14	
Mohammed Saeid	MF	Sweden	2017	3	0	0	
Aaron Schoenfeld	FW	(United States) USA	2020	14	1	0	
Rasmus Schüller	MF	Finland	2017-2019	53	1	4	
Samuel Shashoua	FW	England	2024-2025	8	0	0	
**Peter Stroud**	MF	(United States) USA	2026-	1	0	0	
Ismael Tajouri-Shradi	MF	Libya	2023	10	1	3	
Miguel Tapias	DF	Mexico	2023-2024	57	1	1	
**D.J. Taylor**	DF	(United States) USA	2021-	99	1	6	
Jermaine Taylor	DF	Jamaica	2017	14	0	0	
Jérôme Thiesson	DF	Switzerland	2017-2018	47	2	4	
Mason Toye	FW	(United States) USA	2018-2020	42	7	4	
**Wil Trapp**	MF	(United States) USA	2021-	170	4	12	
**Nectarios Triantis**	MF	Greece	2025-	22	3	3	
Zarek Valentin	DF	Puerto Rico	2023-2024	24	0	2	
Johan Venegas	FW	Costa Rica	2017-2018	22	2	5	
Kevin Venegas	DF	(United States) USA	2017	6	0	0	
Collen Warner	MF	(United States) USA	2017-2018	42	1	1	
Patrick Weah	FW	Liberia	2021-2024	5	0	0	
**Kelvin Yeboah**	FW	Italy	2024-	60	27	5	

=== Goalkeepers ===
Name	Nationality	Years	Games	Conceded	Clean Sheets	Source
John Alvbåge	Sweden	2017	3	10	0	
**Drake Callender**	(United States) USA	2026-	22	30	5	
Clint Irwin	(United States) USA	2023-2024	9	19	0	
Matt Lampson	(United States) USA	2018	9	20	0	
Vito Mannone	Italy	2019	34	43	11	
Tyler Miller	(United States) USA	2020-2022	38	43	11	
Greg Ranjitsingh	Trinidad and Tobago	2020	3	8	0	
Bobby Shuttleworth	(United States) USA	2017-2019	58	111	7	
**Alec Smir**	(United States) USA	2024-	6	11	0	
**Wessel Speel**	Netherlands	2025-	3	6	0	
Dayne St. Clair	Canada	2019-2025	135	174	36	
