= 2023 Minnesota United FC season =

Minnesota United FC
2023 season
- Owner: Bill McGuire
- Head coach: Sean McAuley (Interim)
- Stadium: Allianz Field
- Major League Soccer: Conference: 11th Overall: 21st
- MLS Cup Playoffs: DNQ
- U.S. Open Cup: Round of 16
- Leagues Cup: Quarterfinals
- Top goalscorer: League: Teemu Pukki (10); All: Bongokuhle Hlongwane (17)
- Highest home attendance: 19,954
- Lowest home attendance: 18,410
- Average home league attendance: 19,568
- Biggest win: MIN 5-2 LAG (10/7)
- Biggest defeat: MIN 0-4 MTL (6/10)
Home colors	Away colors

The 2023 Minnesota United FC season was the club's fourteenth season of existence and seventh season in Major League Soccer. Their season began on February 25, 2023, where they faced FC Dallas in Frisco. The club played its home matches at Allianz Field in Saint Paul, Minnesota. The club failed to reach the MLS Cup Playoffs for the first time since 2018. On October 6, the club fired Technical Director Mark Watson and Head Coach Adrian Heath.

== Technical Staff ==
As of October 7th, 2023

Position	Name
Sporting Director	(United States) Manny Lagos
Technical Director	vacant
Head coach	vacant
Assistant coaches	(England) Sean McAuley (Interim Head Coach)
Assistant coaches	(United States) Ian Fuller
Goalkeeper coach	(Scotland) Stewart Kerr

== Roster ==
As of August 4th, 2023

No.	Name	Nationality	Position	Date of birth (age)	Signed from
Goalkeepers
1	Clint Irwin	(United States)	GK	April 1, 1989 (age 37)	(United States) Colorado Rapids
13	Eric Dick	(United States)	GK	October 3, 1994 (age 32)	(United States) Columbus Crew
97	Dayne St. Clair	(Canada)	GK	May 9, 1997 (age 29)	(United States) Maryland Terrapins
99	Fred Emmings (HGP)	(United States)	GK	February 8, 2004 (age 22)	(United States) MNUFC Academy
Defenders
2	Devin Padelford (HGP)	(United States)	DF	January 3, 2003 (age 23)	(United States) MNUFC Academy
3	Zarek Valentin	(Puerto Rico)	DF	August 6, 1991 (age 35)	(United States) Houston Dynamo FC
4	Miguel Tapias	(Mexico)	DF	January 9, 1997 (age 29)	(Mexico) C.F. Pachuca
5	Ethan Bristow	(Saint Kitts and Nevis)	DF	November 27, 2001 (age 24)	(England) Tranmere Rovers F.C.
6	Mikael Marqués	(Sweden)	DF	September 8, 2001 (age 25)	(Sweden) AFC Eskilstuna
12	Bakaye Dibassy	(Mali)	DF	August 11, 1989 (age 37)	(France) Amiens SC
14	Brent Kallman	(United States)	DF	October 4, 1990 (age 36)	(United States) Minnesota United FC (NASL)
15	Michael Boxall	(New Zealand)	DF	August 18, 1988 (age 38)	(South Africa) SuperSport United
26	Ryen Jiba	(South Sudan)	DF	April 29, 2001 (age 25)	(United States) Union Omaha
27	DJ Taylor	(United States)	DF	August 26, 1997 (age 29)	(United States) North Carolina FC
Midfielders
8	Joseph Rosales	(Honduras)	MF	November 6, 2000 (age 26)	(Argentina) CA Independiente
10	Emanuel Reynoso (DP)	(Argentina)	MF	November 16, 1995 (age 30)	(Argentina) Boca Juniors
11	Jeong Sang-bin	(South Korea)	MF	April 1, 2002 (age 24)	(England) Wolverhampton Wanderers F.C.
17	Robin Lod	(Finland)	MF	April 17, 1993 (age 33)	(Spain) Sporting Gijón
18	Ismael Tajouri-Shradi	(Libya)	MF	March 28, 1994 (age 32)	(Cyprus) AC Omonia
20	Wil Trapp	(United States)	MF	January 15, 1993 (age 33)	(United States) Inter Miami CF
24	Ján Greguš	(Slovakia)	MF	January 29, 1991 (age 35)	(United States) Nashville SC
31	Hassani Dotson	(United States)	MF	August 6, 1997 (age 29)	(United States) Lane United FC
33	Kervin Arriaga	(Honduras)	MF	January 5, 1998 (age 28)	(Honduras) C.D. Marathon
42	Emmanuel Iwe	(Nigeria)	MF	September 12, 2000 (age 26)	(United States) Minnesota United FC 2
Forwards
7	Franco Fragapane	(Argentina)	FW	February 6, 1993 (age 33)	(Argentina) Talleres
16	Tani Oluwaseyi	(Nigeria)	FW	May 15, 2000 (age 26)	(United States) St John's Red Storm
21	Bongokuhle Hlongwane	(South Africa)	FW	June 20, 2000 (age 26)	(South Africa) Maritzburg United
22	Teemu Pukki (DP)	(Finland)	FW	March 29, 1990 (age 36)	(England) Norwich City F.C.
23	Cameron Dunbar (HGP)	(United States)	FW	October 22, 2002 (age 24)	(United States) LA Galaxy
28	Ménder García (DP)	(Colombia)	FW	October 28, 1998 (age 28)	(Colombia) Once Caldas
29	Patrick Weah (HGP)	(Liberia)	FW	December 5, 2003 (age 22)	(United States) Saint Louis Billikens

== Transfers ==
=== Transfers in ===
Date	Position	No.	Player	From club	Notes	Ref.
November 7, 2022	FW	23	(United States) Cameron Dunbar	(United States) LA Galaxy	Trade	
November 30, 2022	MF	8	(Honduras) Joseph Rosales	(Panama) CAI	Transfer	
December 6, 2022	GK	1	(United States) Clint Irwin	(United States) Colorado Rapids	Free Agent	
December 8, 2022	DF	3	(Puerto Rico) Zarek Valentin	(United States) Houston Dynamo FC	Free Agent	
December 12, 2022	DF	5	(Canada) Doneil Henry	(United States) Toronto FC	Waivers	
January 23, 2023	DF	6	(Sweden) Mikael Marqués	(Sweden) AFC Eskilstuna	Transfer	
February 8, 2023	DF	4	(Mexico) Miguel Tapias	(Mexico) C.F. Pachuca	Transfer	
March 22, 2023	MF	11	(South Korea) Jeong Sang-bin	(England) Wolverhampton Wanderers F.C.	Transfer	
June 27, 2023	FW	22	(Finland) Teemu Pukki	(England) Norwich City F.C.	Free Agent	
July 6, 2023	MF	18	(Libya) Ismael Tajouri-Shradi	(Cyprus) AC Omonia	Free Agent	
July 18, 2023	DF	5	(Saint Kitts and Nevis) Ethan Bristow	(England) Tranmere Rovers F.C.	Transfer	
August 3, 2023	MF	24	(Slovakia) Ján Greguš	(United States) Nashville SC	Trade	

=== MLS SuperDraft ===
Round	Pick	Player	Position	Previous club	Status	Ref
1	19	(South Sudan) Ryen Jiba	Defender	Union Omaha	Signed	
2	48	(Nigeria) Emmanuel Iwe	Midfielder	St. Cloud State	Signed	

=== Transfers out ===
Date	Position	No.	Player	To club	Notes	Ref.
November 7, 2022	MF	25	(United States) Aziel Jackson	(United States) St. Louis City SC	Traded	
November 14, 2022	FW	18	(Ghana) Abu Danladi	(Albania) KF Bylis	Option declined	
November 14, 2022	MF	5	(United States) Jacori Hayes	(United States) San Antonio FC	Option declined	
November 14, 2022	MF	11	(Denmark) Niko Hansen	(United States) San Antonio FC	Option declined	
November 14, 2022	DF	91	(Jamaica) Oniel Fisher	(United States) Detroit City FC	Option declined	
November 14, 2022	DF	36	(United States) Nabilai Kibunguchy	(United States) Orlando City B	Option declined	
November 14, 2022	FW	24	(Jamaica) Justin McMaster	Free Agent	Option declined	
November 14, 2022	GK	1	(United States) Tyler Miller	(United States) D.C. United	Option declined	
November 14, 2022	DF	19	(Madagascar) Romain Métanire	(Belgium) Seraing	Option declined	
November 14, 2022	DF	4	(Canada) Callum Montgomery	(Canada) Cavalry FC	Option declined	
February 24, 2023	DF	2	(Paraguay) Alan Benítez	(Paraguay) Cerro Porteño	Mutual contract termination	
June 1, 2023	DF	5	(Canada) Doneil Henry	(Canada) HFX Wanderers FC	Waived	
June 10, 2023	FW	9	(Paraguay) Luis Amarilla	(Mexico) Mazatlán F.C.	Transfer	
August 3, 2023	DF	92	(Jamaica) Kemar Lawrence	Free Agent	Mutual Contract Termination	

=== Loans in ===
Start date	End date	Position	No.	Player	From club	Ref.
Short-Term March 25		MF	42	Emmanuel Iwe	Minnesota United FC 2	
Short-Term March 25		MF	34	Zaydan Bello	Minnesota United FC 2	
Short-Term April 1		MF	42	Emmanuel Iwe	Minnesota United FC 2	
Short-Term April 22		DF	37	Britton Fischer	Minnesota United FC 2	
Short-Term June 10		MF	42	Emmanuel Iwe	Minnesota United FC 2	

=== Loans out ===
Start date	End date	Position	No.	Player	To club	Ref.
April 27	End of Season	FW	16	Tani Oluwaseyi	San Antonio FC	
May 30	End of Season	FW	29	Patrick Weah	FC Tulsa	
August 15	End of Season	MF	23	Cameron Dunbar	Orange County SC	

== Friendlies ==
Win Draw Loss

January 18 Friendly	Minnesota United FC	1–0	New York City FC	Florida
	Oluwaseyi	Report		Attendance: 0
Note: Played behind closed doors

January 27 Friendly	Minnesota United FC	2–2	Philadelphia Union	Florida
	Lod; Pacheco	Report	Carranza; Gazdag	Attendance: 0
Note: Played behind closed doors

February 1 Friendly	Minnesota United FC	0–2	Orlando City SC	Florida
		Report	Kara; Dan	Attendance: 0
Note: Played behind closed doors

February 11 Friendly	Minnesota United FC	0–1	New York Red Bulls	California
		Report	Luquinhas
Note: Played behind closed doors

February 15 Friendly	Minnesota United FC	1–4	San Jose Earthquakes	California
	García	Report	Espinoza; Tsakiris; Munie
Note: Played behind closed doors

February 18 Friendly	Minnesota United FC	0–2	Vancouver Whitecaps FC	California
		Report	Gressel; Gauld
Note: Played behind closed doors

June 28 Friendly	Minnesota United FC (United States)	2–1	(Germany) 1. FC Kaiserslautern	St. Paul, Minnesota
7:30 PM CT	García 21'; Jeong 24'	Report	Boyd 5'	Stadium: Allianz Field; Referee: Fotis Bazakos

== Competitions ==
=== MLS regular season ===
==== Standings ====
===== Overall =====
Overall MLS standings table
Pos	Team	Pld	W	L	T	GF	GA	GD	Pts
19	Charlotte FC	34	10	11	13	45	52	−7	43
20	CF Montréal	34	12	17	5	36	52	−16	41
21	Minnesota United FC	34	10	13	11	46	51	−5	41
22	New York City FC	34	9	11	14	35	39	−4	41
23	D.C. United	34	10	14	10	45	49	−4	40

Source: MLS
Rules for classification: 1) points; 2) total wins; 3) total goal differential; 4) total goals scored; 5) fewer disciplinary points; 6) away goal differential; 7) away goals scored; 8) home goals differential; 9) home goals scored; 10) coin toss (2 clubs tied) or drawing of lots (≥3 clubs tied)

===== Western Conference =====
MLS Western Conference table (2023)
Pos	Team	Pld	W	L	T	GF	GA	GD	Pts	Qualification
2	Seattle Sounders FC	34	14	9	11	41	32	+9	53	Qualification for round one
3	Los Angeles FC	34	14	10	10	54	39	+15	52	Qualification for round one
4	Houston Dynamo FC	34	14	11	9	51	38	+13	51	Qualification for round one
5	Real Salt Lake	34	14	12	8	48	50	−2	50	Qualification for round one
6	Vancouver Whitecaps FC	34	12	10	12	55	48	+7	48	Qualification for round one
7	FC Dallas	34	11	10	13	41	37	+4	46	Qualification for round one
8	Sporting Kansas City	34	12	14	8	48	51	−3	44	Qualification for the wild card round
9	San Jose Earthquakes	34	10	10	14	39	43	−4	44	Qualification for the wild card round
10	Portland Timbers	34	11	13	10	46	58	−12	43	
11	Minnesota United FC	34	10	13	11	46	51	−5	41	
12	Austin FC	34	10	15	9	49	55	−6	39	
13	LA Galaxy	34	8	14	12	51	67	−16	36	
14	Colorado Rapids	34	5	17	12	26	54	−28	27	

Source: MLS
Rules for classification: 1) points; 2) total wins; 3) total goal differential; 4) total goals scored; 5) fewer disciplinary points; 6) away goal differential; 7) away goals scored; 8) home goals differential; 9) home goals scored; 10) coin toss (2 clubs tied) or drawing of lots (≥3 clubs tied)

==== Results summary ====
Overall								Home						Away					
Pld	Pts	W	L	T	GF	GA	GD	W	L	T	GF	GA	GD	W	L	T	GF	GA	GD
34	41	10	13	11	46	51	−5	4	4	9	24	20	+4	6	9	2	22	31	−9

Last updated: October 21st, 2023
Source: MLS Results
Pld = Matches played; Pts = Points; W = Matches won; T = Matches tied; L = Matches lost; GF = Goals for; GA = Goals against; GD = Goal difference

==== Regular season ====
February 25 1	FC Dallas	0–1	Minnesota United FC	Frisco, Texas
7:30 PM CT	Farfan (yellow card) 62'	Report	Trapp (yellow card) 24'; Garcia 48'; Tapias (yellow card) 50'	Stadium: Toyota Stadium; Attendance: 19,096; Referee: Ramy Touchan

March 11 2	Minnesota United FC	1–1	New York Red Bulls	St. Paul, Minnesota
7:30 PM CT	Hlongwane 18'; Arriaga (yellow card) 76'	Report	Nealis (yellow card) 36'; Reyes 49'; Cásseres (yellow card) 68'; Duncan (yellow card) 87'	Stadium: Allianz Field; Attendance: 19,614; Referee: Chris Penso

March 18 3	Colorado Rapids	1–2	Minnesota United FC	Commerce City, Colorado
8:30 PM CT	Max (yellow card) 35'; Bassett 49'; Priso-Mbongue (yellow card) 81'	Report	Amarilla 54' (pen.); St. Clair (yellow card) 57'; Arriaga (yellow card) 59'; Tapias 82'	Stadium: Dick's Sporting Goods Park; Attendance: 12,538; Referee: Rubiel Vazquez

March 25 4	Minnesota United FC	1–1	Vancouver Whitecaps FC	St. Paul, Minnesota
7:30 PM CT	García 40'; Trapp (yellow card) 58'; Tapias (yellow card) 76'; Bello (yellow card) 90+2'; Amarilla (yellow card) 90+2'	Report	Blackmon (yellow card) 54'; Ahmed (yellow card) 73'; White (yellow card) 89'; Becher 90+8'	Stadium: Allianz Field; Attendance: 19,609; Referee: Rosendo Mendoza

April 1 5	St. Louis City SC	0–1	Minnesota United FC	St. Louis, Missouri
7:30 PM CT	Stroud (yellow card) 28'; Parker (yellow card) 61'; Hiebert (yellow card) 76'	Report	Fragapane (yellow card) 19'; Amarilla 78' (pen.); Arriaga (yellow card) 83'	Stadium: Citypark; Attendance: 22,423; Referee: Jon Freemon

April 8 6	Chicago Fire FC	2–1	Minnesota United FC	Chicago, Illinois
7:30 PM CT	Kamara 24', 36'; Omsberg (yellow card) 82'	Report	Arriaga 57'	Stadium: Soldier Field; Attendance: 12,128; Referee: Timothy Ford

April 15 7	Minnesota United FC	1–2	Orlando City SC	St. Paul, Minnesota
7:30 PM CT	Hlongwane 58'; Arriaga (yellow card) 90+3'	Report	Angulo 66'; McGuire 88'	Stadium: Allianz Field; Attendance: 19,685; Referee: Pierre-Luc Lauziere

April 22 8	Seattle Sounders FC	1–0	Minnesota United FC	Seattle, Washington
9:30 PM CT	Rusnák 79'; Yeimar (yellow card) 81'	Report	Jeong (yellow card) 43'; Boxall (yellow card) 56'	Stadium: Lumen Field; Attendance: 30,025; Referee: Armando Villarreal

April 30 9	Minnesota United FC	0–0	FC Dallas	St. Paul, Minnesota
8:00 PM CT	Jeong (yellow card) 31'; Fragapane (yellow card) 86'	Report	Martínez (yellow card) 45+1'	Stadium: Allianz Field; Attendance: 18,410; Referee: Allen Chapman

May 6 10	Vancouver Whitecaps FC	3–2	Minnesota United FC	Vancouver, British Columbia
9:30 PM CT	White 17', 52'; Becher 56'	Report	Boxall 33'; Jeong 65'	Stadium: BC Place; Attendance: 14,047; Referee: Filip Dujic

May 13 11	Sporting Kansas City	3–0	Minnesota United FC	Kansas City, Kansas
7:30 PM CT	Rosero 9' (yellow card) 21'; Sallói 22'; Kinda 84'	Report	Tapias (yellow card) 36'; Boxall (yellow card) 66'	Stadium: Children's Mercy Park; Attendance: 17,851; Referee: Alex Chilowicz

May 17 12	Minnesota United FC	1–0	Houston Dynamo FC	St. Paul, Minnesota
7:30 PM CT	Hlongwane 14' (yellow card) 40'; Trapp (yellow card) 30'; Dotson (yellow card) 67'	Report	Micael (yellow card) 50'	Stadium: Allianz Field; Attendance: 18,897; Referee: Marcos de Oliveira

May 20 13	Portland Timbers	0–1	Minnesota United FC	Portland, Oregon
9:30 PM CT	McGraw (yellow card) 63'; Bravo (yellow card) 67'; Župarić (yellow card) 84'	Report	Boxall (yellow card) 82'; Hlongwane 90+5' (yellow card) 90+5'	Stadium: Providence Park; Attendance: 22,137; Referee: Armando Villarreal

May 27 14	Minnesota United FC	1–1	Real Salt Lake	St. Paul, Minnesota
7:30 PM CT	Amarilla (yellow card) 4'; Glad 31' (o.g.); Taylor (yellow card) 73'	Report	Savarino 28'; Glad (yellow card) 45+7'; Ojeda (yellow card) 59'; Rubin (yellow card) 71'	Stadium: Allianz Field; Attendance: 19,912; Referee: Rosendo Mendoza

May 31 15	Austin FC	2–1	Minnesota United FC	Austin, Texas
7:30 PM CT	Gallagher 19' (yellow card) 90'; Driussi 82'	Report	Rosales 26'	Stadium: Q2 Stadium; Attendance: 20,738; Referee: Fotis Bazakos

June 3 16	Minnesota United FC	1–1	Toronto FC	St. Paul, Minnesota
7:30 PM CT	Trapp (yellow card) 31'; Arriaga 89'	Report	Insigne 58'; Servania (yellow card) 90'	Stadium: Allianz Field; Attendance: 19,743; Referee: Ramy Touchan

June 10 17	CF Montréal	4–0	Minnesota United FC	Montreal, Quebec
6:30 PM CT	Toye 7', 57'; Brault-Guillard 13'; Saliba (yellow card) 16'; Lassiter (yellow card) 69'; Camacho 76' (yellow card) 79'; Corbo (yellow card) 90+3'	Report	Taylor (yellow card) 47'; Boxall (yellow card) 59'	Stadium: Saputo Stadium; Attendance: 17,030; Referee: Guido Gonzales Jr.

June 24 18	Real Salt Lake	2–2	Minnesota United FC	Sandy, Utah
8:30 PM CT	Silva (yellow card) 58'; Musovski 79'; Glad 90+8'	Report	Dotson 27'; Reynoso 39'; Irwin (yellow card) 90+2'	Stadium: America First Field; Attendance: 19,439; Referee: Tori Penso

July 1 19	Minnesota United FC	4–1	Portland Timbers	St. Paul, Minnesota
7:30 PM CT	Tapias (yellow card) 13'; Boxall (yellow card) 16'; Dotson (yellow card) 21'; Taylor (yellow card) 34'; Chará 43' (o.g.); Reynoso 45+4', 77' (yellow card) 73'; Hlongwane 74'	Report	Boli 60'; Paredes (yellow card) 90+1'	Stadium: Allianz Field; Attendance: 19,844; Referee: Lukasz Szpala

July 8 20	Minnesota United FC	1–4	Austin FC	St. Paul, Minnesota
7:30 PM CT	Dotson (yellow card) 54'; Padelford 85'	Report	Fagúndez 35'; Driussi 45' (pen.), 51'; Pereira (yellow card) 81'; Rigoni 90+5'	Stadium: Allianz Field; Attendance: 19,913; Referee: Alex Chilowicz

July 12 21	Houston Dynamo FC	0–3	Minnesota United FC	Houston, Texas
7:30 PM CT	Micael (yellow card) 68'; Escobar (yellow card) 90+1'	Report	Hlongwane 15'; Pukki 20'; Tajouri-Shradi 87'	Stadium: Shell Energy Stadium; Attendance: 11,855; Referee: Marcos de Oliveira

July 15 22	Minnesota United FC	1–1	Los Angeles FC	St. Paul, Minnesota
7:30 PM CT	Reynoso 24'; Taylor (yellow card) 45'	Report	Vela 21'; Palacios (yellow card) 40'; Sánchez (yellow card) 44'	Stadium: Allianz Field; Attendance: 19,954; Referee: Allen Chapman

August 20 23	New York City FC	0–2	Minnesota United FC	New York, New York
6:30 PM CT	Sands (yellow card) 32'; Pellegrini (yellow card) 39'	Report	Greguš 53'; Trapp (yellow card) 60'; Reynoso (yellow card) 62'; García 90+5'	Stadium: Citi Field; Attendance: 18,606; Referee: Nima Saghafi

August 27 24	Minnesota United FC	1–1	Seattle Sounders FC	St. Paul, Minnesota
3:30 PM CT	Yeimar 56' (o.g.)	Report	Yeimar 17'	Stadium: Allianz Field; Attendance: 19,812; Referee: Timothy Ford

August 30 25	Minnesota United FC	3–0	Colorado Rapids	St. Paul, Minnesota
7:30 PM CT	Reynoso 18' (pen.), 28'; Pukki 43'; Taylor (yellow card) 58'	Report	Galván (yellow card) 48'; Tavares (yellow card) 64'; Wilson (yellow card) 71'; Ronan (yellow card) 76'; Bombito (yellow card) 79'	Stadium: Allianz Field; Attendance: 19,634; Referee: Marcos de Oliveira

September 2 26	San Jose Earthquakes	1–1	Minnesota United FC	San Jose, California
9:30 PM CT	Cowell 16'; Gruezo (yellow card) 31'	Report	Pukki 4'; Reynoso (yellow card) 40'; Boxall (yellow card) 85'	Stadium: PayPal Park; Attendance: 16,151; Referee: Alexis Da Silva

September 9 27	Minnesota United FC	1–1	New England Revolution	St. Paul, Minnesota
7:30 PM CT	Fragapane 90+3'	Report	Jones (yellow card) 14'; González (yellow card) 25'; Gil 38'; Edwards Jr. (yellow card) 74'; Polster (yellow card) 75'	Stadium: Allianz Field; Attendance: 19,412; Referee: Jair Marrufo
Note: Match originally scheduled for June 21

September 16 28	Minnesota United FC	0–1	Sporting Kansas City	St. Paul, Minnesota
7:30 PM CT	Taylor (yellow card) 24'	Report	Fontàs (yellow card) 44'; Kinda 84' (yellow card) 90+5'; Sallói (yellow card) 90+1'	Stadium: Allianz Field; Attendance: 19,685; Referee: Tori Penso

September 20 29	LA Galaxy	4–3	Minnesota United FC	Carson, California
9:30 PM CT	Sharp 16', 63', 71', (yellow card) 67'; Boyd (yellow card) 54'; Delgado (yellow card) 81'; Fagúndez 82'; Edwards (yellow card) 90+1'	Report	Pukki 19'; Tapias (yellow card) 27'; Greguš (yellow card) 28'; Boxall (yellow card) 29'; Hlongwane 41', 45+5'; Bristow (yellow card) 54' (yellow-red card) 74'; Tajouri-Shradi (yellow card) 88'	Stadium: Dignity Health Sports Park; Attendance: 16,120; Referee: Rosendo Mendoza

September 23 30	Minnesota United FC	1–2	St. Louis City SC	St. Paul, Minnesota
7:30 PM CT	St. Clair (yellow card) 20'; Greguš (yellow card) 31'; Pukki 48' (pen.); Boxall (yellow card) 79'; Taylor (yellow card) 85'	Report	Yaro (yellow card) 29'; Bürki (yellow card) 47'; Bell (yellow card) 59'; Klauss 64'; Blom 73'	Stadium: Allianz Field; Attendance: 19,197; Referee: Victor Rivas

September 30 31	Minnesota United FC	1–1	San Jose Earthquakes	St. Paul, Minnesota
7:30 PM CT	Pukki 56'; Arriaga (yellow card) 90+1'	Report	Marie 82'	Stadium: Allianz Field; Attendance: 19,645; Referee: Ted Unkel

October 4 32	Los Angeles FC	5–1	Minnesota United FC	Los Angeles, California
9:30 PM CT	Bouanga 6', 36', 45+1'; Tapias 46' (o.g.); Krastev 67'	Report	Dotson 4'; Reynoso (yellow card) 39'	Stadium: BMO Stadium; Attendance: 22,041; Referee: Guido Gonzales Jr.

October 7 33	Minnesota United FC	5–2	LA Galaxy	St. Paul, Minnesota
7:30 PM CT	Dotson 33'; Pukki 45', 60', 67', 76'	Report	Boyd 41'; Yoshida (yellow card) 50'; Joveljić 82'	Stadium: Allianz Field; Attendance: 19,693; Referee: Timothy Ford

October 21 34	Sporting Kansas City	3–1	Minnesota United FC	Kansas City, Kansas
8:00 PM CT	Russell 28', 78'; Walter 31'; Davis (yellow card) 85'	Report	Trapp (yellow card) 53'; Taylor (yellow card) 66'; Boxall (yellow card) 68' (goal) 82'	Stadium: Children's Mercy Park; Attendance: 20,479; Referee: Ismail Elfath

=== U.S. Open Cup ===
April 25 Third Round	Detroit City FC (USLC) (Michigan)	1–3	Minnesota United FC (MLS)	Hamtramck, Michigan
6:30 PM CT	Matthews 5'; Rodriguez (yellow card) 49'; McCabe (yellow card) 90+1'	Report	Fragapane 60'; Iwe 63'; Amarilla 66'; Hlongwane (yellow card) 69'	Stadium: Keyworth Stadium; Attendance: 4,529; Referee: Christian Little

May 9 Round of 32	Minnesota United FC (MLS)	3–3 (a.e.t.) (7–6 p)	(Pennsylvania) Philadelphia Union (MLS)	Saint Paul, Minnesota
7:30 PM CDT	Lod (yellow card) 30'; Hlongwane 68', 103'; Rosales 74' (yellow card) 90+2'; Arriaga (yellow card) 102'	Report	Lowe (yellow card) 34'; Donovan 78'; Wagner (yellow card) 90' (goal) 90+4', 120'; Elliott (yellow card) 110'; Real (yellow card) 115'	Stadium: Allianz Field; Attendance: 4,216; Referee: Fotis Bazakos
	Penalties
	Fragapane (penalty scored); Trapp (penalty scored); Arriaga (penalty missed); Rosales (penalty scored); Dunbar (penalty scored); Kallman (penalty scored); Boxall (penalty scored); Tapias (penalty scored)		Gazdag (penalty scored); Elliott (penalty scored); Real (penalty missed); Torres (penalty scored); Carranza (penalty scored); Rafanello (penalty scored); Lowe (penalty scored); Wagner (penalty missed)

May 23 Round of 16	Houston Dynamo FC (MLS) (Texas)	4–0	Minnesota United FC (MLS)	Houston, Texas
7:30 PM CDT	Baird; Ibrahim 79'; Caicedo (yellow card) 82'	Report	Arriaga (yellow card) 30' (yellow-red card) 38'; Boxall (yellow card) 67'	Stadium: Shell Energy Stadium; Attendance: 2,947; Referee: Ramy Touchan

=== Leagues Cup ===
==== Central 2 ====
Pos	Team	Pld	W	PW	PL	L	GF	GA	GD	Pts	Qualification	CHI	MIN	PUE
1	(United States) Chicago Fire FC	2	1	0	1	0	4	3	+1	4	Advance to knockout stage	—	—	—
2	(United States) Minnesota United FC	2	1	0	0	1	6	3	+3	3	Advance to knockout stage	2–3	—	—
3	(Mexico) Puebla	2	0	1	0	1	1	5	−4	2		1–1	0–4	—

Source: Leagues Cup
Rules for classification: Tiebreakers

July 23 GS	Puebla (Mexico)	0–4	(United States) Minnesota United FC	St. Paul, Minnesota
9:00 pm ET	Robles (yellow card) 5'; Silva (yellow card) 57'; Olmedo (yellow card) 71'	Report	Hlongwane 24', 51'; Boxall (red card) 30'; Reynoso 59', 65'	Stadium: Allianz Field; Attendance: 19,609; Referee: Selvin Brown

July 27 GS	Minnesota United FC (United States)	2–3	(United States) Chicago Fire FC	St. Paul, Minnesota
8:30 pm ET	Tapias (yellow card) 45+2'; Arriaga (yellow card) 58'; Hlongwane 62', 73'	Report	Herbers (yellow card) 57'; Shaqiri 69' (pen.); Giménez (yellow card) 72'; Souquet 79'; Kamara 83'	Stadium: Allianz Field; Attendance: 18,419; Referee: Nima Saghafi

August 4 R32	Columbus Crew (United States)	3–3 (3–4 p)	(United States) Minnesota United FC	Columbus, Ohio
8:00 pm ET	Cheberko (yellow card) 20'; Hernández (yellow card) 41'; Amundsen 42'; Mățan 51'; Nagbe (yellow card) 52'; Ramirez 83'	Report	Hlongwane 17', 54'; Boxall (yellow card) 45'; Trapp (yellow card) 79'; Dotson 90'	Stadium: Lower.com Field; Attendance: 20,217; Referee: Reon Radix
	Penalties
	Hernández (penalty scored); Ramirez (penalty scored); Mățan (penalty scored); Molino (penalty missed); Moreira (penalty missed); Amundsen (penalty missed)		(penalty scored) Reynoso; (penalty scored) Rosales; (penalty scored) Boxall; (penalty missed) García; (penalty missed) Hlongwane; (penalty scored) Tapias

August 8 R16	Minnesota United FC (United States)	2–2 (4–2 p)	(Mexico) Toluca	St. Paul, Minnesota
8:30 pm ET	Rosales 13' (yellow card) 74'; Hlongwane 32'; Dotson (yellow card) 38' (yellow-red card) 73'; St. Clair (yellow card) 64'; Trapp (yellow card) 90+5'	Report	García (yellow card) 30'; Huerta 66'; Ruiz (yellow card) 67'; Volpi 75' (pen.); Navarrow (yellow card) 90+6'	Stadium: Allianz Field; Attendance: 18,187; Referee: Victor Rivas
	Penalties
	Reynoso (penalty scored); Boxall (penalty scored); Trapp (penalty scored); Jeong (penalty scored)		(penalty scored) Volpi; (penalty missed) Huerta; (penalty scored) Baeza; (penalty missed) Morales

August 11 QF	Nashville SC (United States)	5–0	(United States) Minnesota United FC	Nashville, Tennessee
8:30 pm ET	Moore 39'; Bunbury 44'; Muyl 50'; Surridge 53'; Mukhtar 59'	Report	Trapp (yellow card) 27'; Taylor (red card) 34'	Stadium: Geodis Park; Attendance: 19,915; Referee: Juan Calderón

== Statistics ==
=== Appearances and goals ===
Last updated October 21st, 2023.

No.	Pos	Nat	Player	Total		Major League Soccer		U.S. Open Cup		Leagues Cup		Playoffs	
No.	Pos	Nat	Player	Apps	Goals	Apps	Goals	Apps	Goals	Apps	Goals	Apps	Goals
Goalkeepers
1	GK	(United States) USA	Clint Irwin	7	0	4	0	3	0	0	0	0	0
13	GK	(United States) USA	Eric Dick	0	0	0	0	0	0	0	0	0	0
97	GK	(Canada) CAN	Dayne St. Clair	35	0	30	0	0	0	5	0	0	0
99	GK	(Luxembourg) LUX	Fred Emmings	0	0	0	0	0	0	0	0	0	0
Defenders
2	DF	(United States) USA	Devin Padelford	9	1	0+8	1	1	0	0	0	0	0
3	DF	(Puerto Rico) PUR	Zarek Valentin	26	0	15+5	0	1+1	0	3+1	0	0	0
4	DF	(Mexico) MEX	Miguel Tapias	38	1	32	1	2	0	4	0	0	0
5	DF	(Saint Kitts and Nevis) SKN	Ethan Bristow	12	0	7+2	0	0	0	1+2	0	0	0
6	DF	(Sweden) SWE	Mikael Marqués	1	0	0+1	0	0	0	0	0	0	0
12	DF	(Mali) MLI	Bakaye Dibassy	11	0	5+3	0	0	0	2+1	0	0	0
14	DF	(United States) USA	Brent Kallman	11	0	2+5	0	3	0	0+1	0	0	0
15	DF	(New Zealand) NZL	Michael Boxall	38	2	32	2	2	0	4	0	0	0
26	DF	(South Sudan) SSD	Ryen Jiba	0	0	0	0	0	0	0	0	0	0
27	DF	(United States) USA	DJ Taylor	37	0	29+1	0	3	0	4	0	0	0
Midfielders
8	MF	(Honduras) HON	Joseph Rosales	25	3	13+5	1	3	1	3+1	1	0	0
10	MF	(Argentina) ARG	Emanuel Reynoso	23	8	16+2	6	0	0	5	2	0	0
11	MF	(South Korea) KOR	Jeong Sang-bin	29	1	9+14	1	2+1	0	0+3	0	0	0
17	MF	(Finland) FIN	Robin Lod	11	0	10	0	1	0	0	0	0	0
18	MF	(Libya) LBA	Ismael Tajouri-Shradi	11	1	2+8	1	0	0	0+1	0	0	0
20	MF	(United States) USA	Wil Trapp	37	0	28+2	0	1+1	0	5	0	0	0
24	MF	(Slovakia) SVK	Ján Greguš	12	1	10+2	1	0	0	0	0	0	0
31	MF	(United States) USA	Hassani Dotson	40	4	29+5	3	1+1	0	4	1	0	0
33	MF	(Honduras) HON	Kervin Arriaga	25	2	11+9	2	2+1	0	2	0	0	0
34	MF	(Australia) AUS	Zaydan Bello	1	0	0+1	0	0	0	0	0	0	0
42	MF	(Nigeria) NGR	Emmanuel Iwe	5	1	0+3	0	1	1	0+1	0	0	0
Forwards
7	FW	(Argentina) ARG	Franco Fragapane	31	2	14+10	1	1+2	1	3+1	0	0	0
16	FW	(Nigeria) NGR	Tani Oluwaseyi	3	0	0+2	0	0+1	0	0	0	0	0
21	FW	(South Africa) RSA	Bongokuhle Hlongwane	38	17	29+1	8	1+2	2	5	7	0	0
22	FW	(Finland) FIN	Teemu Pukki	19	10	13+1	10	0	0	5	0	0	0
23	FW	(United States) USA	Cameron Dunbar	4	2	1+2	0	1	0+2	0	0	0	0
28	FW	(Colombia) COL	Ménder García	36	3	14+16	3	2	0	0+4	0	0	0
29	FW	(Liberia) LBR	Patrick Weah	0	0	0	0	0	0	0	0	0	0
Player(s) transferred out but featured this season
9	FW	(Paraguay) PAR	Luis Amarilla	15	3	8+5	2	1+1	1	0	0	0	0
92	DF	(Jamaica) JAM	Kemar Lawrence	16	0	13+1	0	1+1	0	0	0	0	0

=== Goalscorers ===
As of October 21st, 2023

Rank	No.	Pos.	Nat.	Name	Major League Soccer	U.S. Open Cup	Leagues Cup	Playoffs	Total
1	21	FW	(South Africa)	Bongokuhle Hlongwane	8	2	7	0	17
2	22	FW	(Finland)	Teemu Pukki	10	0	0	0	10
3	10	MF	(Argentina)	Emanuel Reynoso	6	0	2	0	8
4	31	MF	(United States)	Hassani Dotson	3	0	1	0	4
5	28	FW	(Colombia)	Ménder García	3	0	0	0	3
5	9	FW	(Paraguay)	Luis Amarilla	2	1	0	0	3
5	8	MF	(Honduras)	Joseph Rosales	1	1	1	0	3
8	33	MF	(Honduras)	Kervin Arriaga	2	0	0	0	2
8	15	DF	(New Zealand)	Michael Boxall	2	0	0	0	2
8	7	FW	(Argentina)	Franco Fragapane	1	1	0	0	2
11	4	DF	(Mexico)	Miguel Tapias	1	0	0	0	1
11	11	MF	(South Korea)	Jeong Sang-bin	1	0	0	0	1
11	2	DF	(United States)	Devin Padelford	1	0	0	0	1
11	18	MF	(Libya)	Ismael Tajouri-Shradi	1	0	0	0	1
11	24	MF	(Slovakia)	Ján Greguš	1	0	0	0	1
11	42	MF	(Nigeria)	Emmanuel Iwe	0	1	0	0	1
Own Goals					3	0	0	0	3
Total					46	6	11	0	63

=== Assists ===
As of October 21st, 2023

Rank	No.	Pos.	Nat.	Name	Major League Soccer	U.S. Open Cup	Leagues Cup	Playoffs	Total
1	10	MF	(Argentina)	Emanuel Reynoso	5	0	3	0	8
2	21	FW	(South Africa)	Bongokuhle Hlongwane	5	1	1	0	7
3	31	MF	(United States)	Hassani Dotson	3	0	1	0	4
3	7	FW	(Argentina)	Franco Fragapane	2	0	2	0	4
5	18	MF	(Libya)	Ismael Tajouri-Shradi	3	0	0	0	3
5	22	FW	(Finland)	Teemu Pukki	1	0	2	0	3
7	17	MF	(Finland)	Robin Lod	2	0	0	0	2
7	28	FW	(Colombia)	Ménder García	2	0	0	0	2
7	3	DF	(Puerto Rico)	Zarek Valentin	2	0	0	0	2
7	33	MF	(Honduras)	Kervin Arriaga	2	0	0	0	2
7	27	DF	(United States)	D.J. Taylor	1	1	0	0	2
7	8	MF	(Honduras)	Joseph Rosales	0	1	1	0	2
13	20	MF	(United States)	Wil Trapp	1	0	0	0	1
13	11	MF	(South Korea)	Jeong Sang-bin	1	0	0	0	1
13	97	GK	(Canada)	Dayne St. Clair	1	0	0	0	1
13	23	FW	(United States)	Cameron Dunbar	0	1	0	0	1

=== Disciplinary record ===
As of October 21st, 2023

Rk.	No.	Pos.	Nat.	Name	Major League Soccer			U.S. Open Cup			Leagues Cup			Playoffs			Total		
Rk.	No.	Pos.	Nat.	Name	Yellow card	Second yellow card	Red card	Yellow card	Second yellow card	Red card	Yellow card	Second yellow card	Red card	Yellow card	Second yellow card	Red card	Yellow card	Second yellow card	Red card
1	15	DF	(New Zealand)	Michael Boxall	9	0	0	1	0	0	1	0	1	0	0	0	11	0	1
2	27	DF	(United States)	D.J. Taylor	8	0	0	0	0	0	0	0	1	0	0	0	8	0	1
3	33	MF	(Honduras)	Kervin Arriaga	5	0	0	1	1	0	1	0	0	0	0	0	7	1	0
4	31	MF	(United States)	Hassani Dotson	3	0	0	0	0	0	0	1	0	0	0	0	3	1	0
5	5	DF	(England)	Ethan Bristow	0	1	0	0	0	0	0	0	0	0	0	0	0	1	0
6	20	MF	(United States)	Wil Trapp	6	0	0	0	0	0	3	0	0	0	0	0	9	0	0
7	4	DF	(Mexico)	Miguel Tapias	5	0	0	0	0	0	1	0	0	0	0	0	6	0	0
8	10	MF	(Argentina)	Emanuel Reynoso	4	0	0	0	0	0	0	0	0	0	0	0	4	0	0
9	7	FW	(Argentina)	Franco Fragapane	3	0	0	0	0	0	0	0	0	0	0	0	3	0	0
9	21	FW	(South Africa)	Bongokuhle Hlongwane	2	0	0	1	0	0	0	0	0	0	0	0	3	0	0
9	97	GK	(Canada)	Dayne St. Clair	2	0	0	0	0	0	1	0	0	0	0	0	3	0	0
12	11	MF	(South Korea)	Jeong Sang-bin	2	0	0	0	0	0	0	0	0	0	0	0	2	0	0
12	9	FW	(Paraguay)	Luis Amarilla	2	0	0	0	0	0	0	0	0	0	0	0	2	0	0
12	24	MF	(Slovakia)	Ján Greguš	2	0	0	0	0	0	0	0	0	0	0	0	2	0	0
12	8	MF	(Honduras)	Joseph Rosales	0	0	0	1	0	0	1	0	0	0	0	0	2	0	0
16	34	MF	(Australia)	Zaydan Bello	1	0	0	0	0	0	0	0	0	0	0	0	1	0	0
16	1	GK	(United States)	Clint Irwin	1	0	0	0	0	0	0	0	0	0	0	0	1	0	0
16	18	MF	(Libya)	Ismael Tajouri-Shradi	1	0	0	0	0	0	0	0	0	0	0	0	1	0	0
16	17	MF	(Finland)	Robin Lod	0	0	0	1	0	0	0	0	0	0	0	0	1	0	0
Totals					56	1	0	5	1	0	8	1	2	0	0	0	69	3	2

=== Clean sheets ===
As of October 21st, 2023

Rank	No.	Pos.	Nat.	Name	Major League Soccer	U.S. Open Cup	Leagues Cup	Playoffs	Total
1	97	GK	(Canada)	Dayne St. Clair	8	0	1	0	9

== Honors and awards ==
=== Bell Bank Man of the Match ===
Note: Bell Bank Man of the Match is voted on by fans on X near the end of each MLS Match.

Player	Position	Times Won	Most Recent
Bongokuhle Hlongwane	FW	7	Sept. 20 at LA Galaxy
Emanuel Reynoso	MF	4	Aug. 30th vs Colorado Rapids
Teemu Pukki	FW	4	Oct. 7th vs LA Galaxy
Michael Boxall	DF	3	Sept. 16th vs Sporting Kansas City
Ménder García	FW	2	Mar. 25th vs Vancouver Whitecaps FC
Jeong Sang-bin	MF	2	May 6 at Vancouver Whitecaps FC
Dayne St. Clair	GK	2	Sept. 2nd at San Jose Earthquakes
Miguel Tapias	DF	1	Apr. 1st at St. Louis City SC
Kervin Arriaga	MF	1	Apr. 8th at Chicago Fire FC
Robin Lod	MF	1	Apr. 30th vs FC Dallas
Joseph Rosales	MF	1	May 31 at Austin FC
Ján Greguš	MF	1	Aug. 20th at New York City FC
Hassani Dotson	MF	1	Aug. 27th vs Seattle Sounders FC

Note: Bell Bank Man of the Match was not awarded after the games against CF Montréal on June 10, Austin FC on July 8, Los Angeles FC on October 4 and Sporting Kansas City on October 21.

=== MLS Team of the Week ===
Week	Player	Opponent	Position	Ref
1	(Honduras) Kervin Arriaga	FC Dallas	Bench	
4	(Mexico) Miguel Tapias	Colorado Rapids	DF	
6	(Canada) Dayne St. Clair	St. Louis City SC	GK	
6	(New Zealand) Michael Boxall	St. Louis City SC	Bench	
13	(South Africa) Bongokuhle Hlongwane	Houston Dynamo FC	MF	
14	(New Zealand) Michael Boxall	Portland Timbers	DF	
14	(South Africa) Bongokuhle Hlongwane	Portland Timbers	Bench	
17	(Honduras) Kervin Arriaga	Toronto FC	Bench	
21	(Argentina) Emanuel Reynoso	Real Salt Lake	Bench	
22	(Argentina) Emanuel Reynoso	Portland Timbers	MF	
22	(South Africa) Bongokuhle Hlongwane	Portland Timbers	FW	
25	(South Africa) Bongokuhle Hlongwane	Houston Dynamo FC	FW	
25	(England) Adrian Heath	Houston Dynamo FC	Coach	
25	(Canada) Dayne St. Clair	Houston Dynamo FC	Bench	
25	(Finland) Teemu Pukki	Houston Dynamo FC	Bench	
26	(Argentina) Emanuel Reynoso	Los Angeles FC	Bench	
27	(Canada) Dayne St. Clair	New York City FC	Bench	
27	(Slovakia) Ján Greguš	New York City FC	Bench	
29	(Argentina) Emanuel Reynoso	Colorado Rapids	MF	
31	(Argentina) Franco Fragapane	New England Revolution	FW	
31	(Canada) Dayne St. Clair	New England Revolution	Bench	
31	(United States) Hassani Dotson	New England Revolution	Bench	
33	(South Africa) Bongokuhle Hlongwane	LA Galaxy	MF	
37	(Finland) Teemu Pukki	LA Galaxy	FW	
37	(South Africa) Bongokuhle Hlongwane	LA Galaxy	Bench	

=== MLS Player of the Matchday ===
Matchday	Player	Opponent	Ref
29	(Argentina) Emanuel Reynoso	Colorado Rapids	
37	(Finland) Teemu Pukki	LA Galaxy	
