= Mender =

Mender may refer to:

- person who mends
- Mark Mender (1933–2024), German fashion photographer and advertising filmmaker
- Ménder García (born 1998), Colombian footballer
- USS Mender

== See also ==
- Mendler
