= Richard Curwin =

American educationist (1944–2018)

Richard Curwin (May 25, 1944 – December 26, 2018) was an expert in the fields of school discipline and classroom management, and taught at the State University of New York at Geneseo, the National Technical Institute for the Deaf, San Francisco State University and David Yellin College in Jerusalem.

== Biography ==
Richard Curwin was born on May 25, 1944, in Cambridge, Massachusetts, and grew up in Brookline, Massachusetts, where he attended Brookline High School. He received his B.A. in English at University of Massachusetts Amherst. He received his MA in education at the Boston State College (now known as University of Massachusetts Boston) and then returned to the University of Massachusetts in Amherst, where he received his Ed.D. He taught seventh grade English and a class for emotionally disturbed children, and later served as a professor of education at the State University of New York at Geneseo, the National Technical Institute for the Deaf, and the San Francisco State University.

He developed the "Discipline with Dignity" methodology of classroom management with Allen Mendler, and presented seminars and workshops on the subject throughout the United States and Canada as well as in Belgium, Germany, Japan, Singapore, and Israel.
