= Mendler =

Mendler is a surname of German origin:

- Allen Mendler (born 1949), American author and educator
- Bridgit Mendler (born 1992), American actress, singer, and songwriter
- Markus Mendler (born 1993), German football player
