= Allen Mendler =

American academic

Allen Mendler is an American author and educator born on October 21, 1949, in New York, New York. He received his PhD in School Psychology from Union Institute in 1980, and he has spent over twenty-five years developing discipline with dignity classroom management methodology for both regular and special classrooms. Mendler's emphasis is on developing effective frameworks and strategies for educators to manage behavior and classrooms. He is an expert at helping youth professionals, teachers, administrators, and parents to help difficult youth succeed.

== Discipline with Dignity method ==
Together with Dr. Richard Curwin, Dr. Mendler developed the 'Discipline with Dignity' approach to classroom management. This methodology attempts to involve students in defining classroom procedures, rules, and consequences based on values or principles compatible with learning. The basic strategies include prevention, action, and resolution. This concept relates problems faced in inner-city schools as they are in rural and suburban schools.

Discipline with Dignity is viewed by proponents of the theory as an in-depth flexible approach for effective school and classroom management. With a strong focus on developing responsibility, it is seen as a comprehensive, practical program that leads to improved student behavior through responsible thinking, cooperation, mutual respect, and shared decision making.

== Books ==
Dr. Mendler is the author or co-author of many books on classroom management and classroom discipline including:

- Discipline with Dignity (1988, ASCD)
- What Do I Do When...?: How to Achieve Discipline with Dignity in the Classroom (1992, Solution Tree)
- Discipline with Dignity for Challenging Youth (1999, Solution Tree)
- Power Struggles: Successful Techniques for Educators (2000, Solution Tree)
- Motivating Students Who Don't Care: Successful Techniques for Educators (2000, Solution Tree)
- Connecting with Students (2001, ASCD)
- MORE What Do I Do When...?: Powerful Strategies to Promote Positive Behavior (2007, Solution Tree)
- When Teaching Gets Tough: Smart Ways to Reclaim Your Game (2012, Ryan

ASCD)

- The Resilient Teacher: How do I stay positive and effective when dealing with difficult people and policies? (2014, ASCD)
