= Miguel Tapias =

Mexican footballer (born 1997)

Personal information
- Full name: Miguel Ángel Tapias Dávila
- Date of birth: 9 January 1997 (age 29)
- Place of birth: Hermosillo, Sonora, Mexico
- Height: 1.80 m (5 ft 11 in)
- Position: Centre-back

Team information
- Current team: Guadalajara
- Number: 4

Youth career
- 2012–2016: Pachuca

Senior career*
Years	Team	Apps	(Gls)
2016–2023	Pachuca	59	(1)
2016–2018	→ Zacatecas (loan)	35	(0)
2023–2024	Minnesota United	57	(1)
2025–	Guadalajara	25	(0)

International career
2015	Mexico U18		
2017	Mexico U20		
- * Club domestic league appearances and goals as of 1 August 2026

Miguel Ángel Tapias Dávila (born 9 January 1997) is a Mexican professional footballer who plays as a centre-back for Liga MX club Guadalajara.

== Club career ==
=== Pachuca ===
Tapias joined the Pachuca youth system at the age of 11, and progressed through the under–15, under–17 and under–20 squads.

Tapias was loaned out to Ascenso MX club Mineros de Zacatecas in the summer of 2016. He made his professional debut in their first match of the Apertura 2016 season, a 1–0 victory over FC Juárez on 16 July. He made 32 appearances for Zacatecas over the next two years, starting in all but one, before returning to Pachuca in June 2018. First-team manager Pako Ayestarán handed Tapias his Liga MX debut on 21 July; he played the full 90 minutes of a 1–0 defeat to Monterrey at centre-back. He scored his first goal two months later in a league win against Cruz Azul at home. On 23 October, Tapias scored against Monterrey in the opening minutes of the Apertura 2018 Copa MX semi-final match, which Pachuca lost in penalties after a 3–3 draw.

In February 2020, Tapias was named to the Liga MX team of the week for the first time in round four of the Clausura 2020 season.

=== Minnesota ===
He transferred to Minnesota United on 8 February 2023. During the MLS 2023 season, Tapias appeared and started in 32 of the 34 regular-season matches. He scored his first MLS goal against the Colorado Rapids on March 18, 2023, when he put away a free kick with a header for the game-winning goal.

=== Guadalajara ===
On 17 December 2024, Tapias joined Guadalajara.

== Personal life ==
Tapias and his wife Leidy have a daughter called Regina.

== Career statistics ==
=== Club ===
As of 1 August 2026

Club	Season	League			Cup (Note: Includes Copa MX, U.S. Open Cup)		Continental		Other		Total	
Club	Season	Division	Apps	Goals	Apps	Goals	Apps	Goals	Apps	Goals	Apps	Goals
Pachuca	2018–19	Liga MX	13	1	7	1	—		—		20	2
Pachuca	2019–20	Liga MX	6	0	6	0	—		—		12	0
Pachuca	2020–21	Liga MX	3	0	—		—		—		3	0
Pachuca	2021–22	Liga MX	24	0	—		—		—		24	0
Pachuca	2022–23	Liga MX	13	0	—		—		—		13	0
Pachuca	Total		59	1	13	1	—		—		72	2
Zacatecas (loan)	2016–17	Ascenso MX	17	0	6	0	—		—		23	0
Zacatecas (loan)	2017–18	Ascenso MX	18	0	5	0	—		—		23	0
Zacatecas (loan)	Total		35	0	11	0	—		—		46	0
Minnesota United	2023	MLS	32	1	2	0	—		4 (Note: Appearances in Leagues Cup)	0	38	1
Minnesota United	2024	MLS	25	0	—		—		2	0	27	0
Minnesota United	Total		57	1	2	0	—		6	0	65	1
Guadalajara	2024–25	Liga MX	9	0	—		3 (Note: Appearances in CONCACAF Champions Cup)	0	—		12	0
Guadalajara	2025–26	Liga MX	16	0	—		—		—		16	0
Guadalajara	Total		25	0	—		3	0	—		28	0
Career total			176	2	26	1	3	0	6	0	211	3

== Honours ==
Pachuca

- Liga MX: Apertura 2022
