= Ethan Bristow =

Kittitian footballer (born 2001)

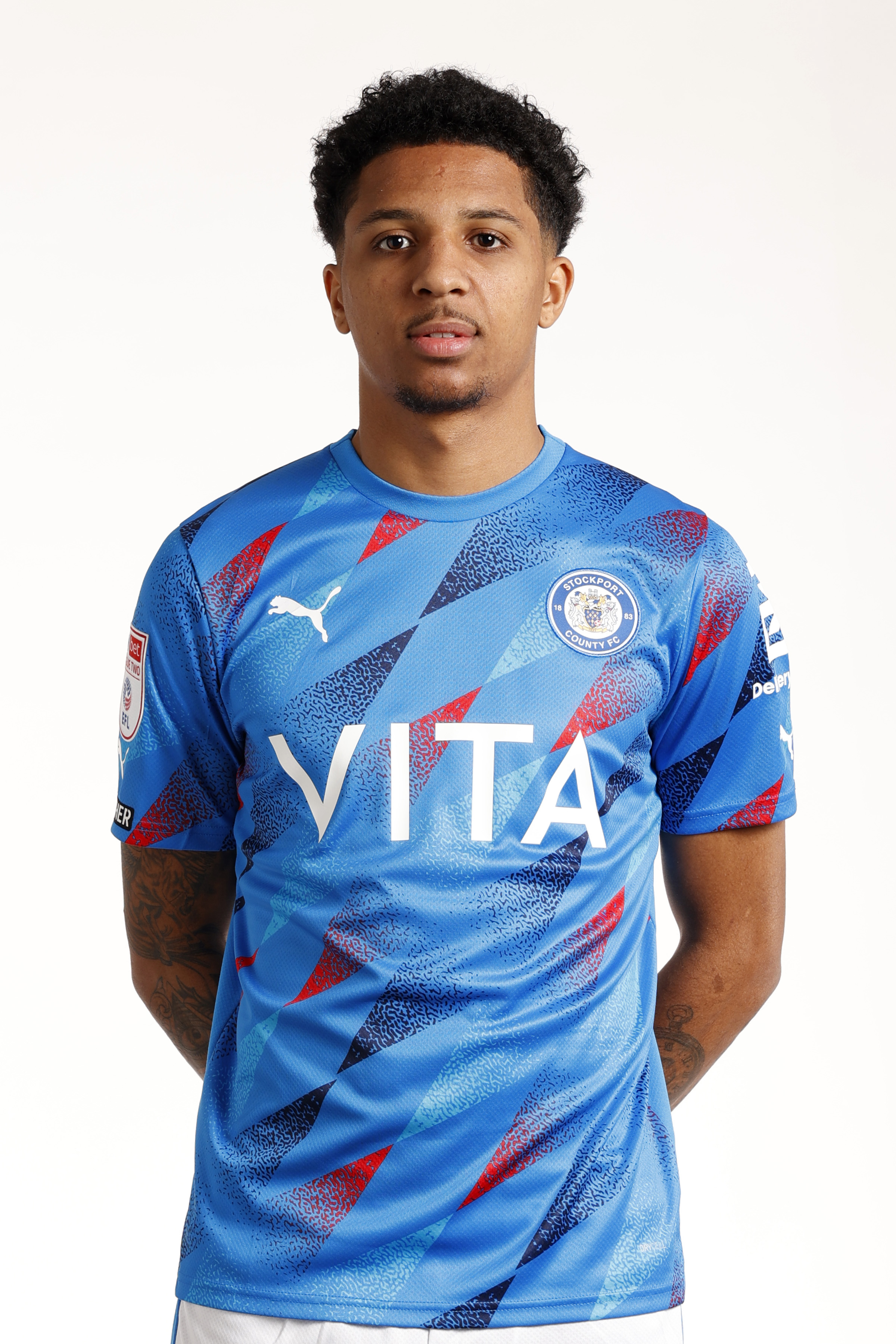
- Ethan Bristow, Stockport County FC

Personal information
- Full name: Ethan David Bristow
- Date of birth: 27 November 2001 (age 24)
- Place of birth: Maidenhead, England
- Height: 6 ft 2 in (1.88 m)
- Positions: Left-back; left wing-back

Team information
- Current team: Harrogate Town
- Number: 3

Youth career
- –2020: Reading

Senior career*
Years	Team	Apps	(Gls)
2020–2022	Reading	6	(0)
2022–2023	Tranmere Rovers	46	(1)
2023–2025	Minnesota United	9	(0)
2024	→ Stockport County (loan)	13	(0)
2025–2026	Tranmere Rovers	19	(0)
2026–	Harrogate Town	0	(0)

International career^{‡}
2023–	Saint Kitts and Nevis	6	(1)
- * Club domestic league appearances and goals as of 12:00, 8 August 2026 (UTC) ‡ National team caps and goals as of 12:31, 16 November 2026

Ethan David Bristow (born 27 November 2001) is a professional footballer who plays as a left wing-back or left-back for National League club Harrogate Town. Born in England, he plays for the Saint Kitts and Nevis national team.

== Career ==
=== Reading ===
Bristow signed his first professional contract with Reading in October 2019, with the contract lasting until 2021.

Bristow made his debut for Reading on 5 September 2020 in a 3–1 EFL Cup victory over Colchester United.

On 20 May 2022, Reading confirmed that Bristow would leave the club upon the expiration of his contract.

=== Tranmere Rovers ===
On 14 June 2022, Tranmere Rovers announced the signing of Bristow to a two-year contract.

=== Minnesota United ===
On 18 July 2023, it was announced that Bristow had signed with Major League Soccer side Minnesota United on a deal until 2025 for an undisclosed fee. On 4 February 2025, Bristow and Minnesota mutually agreed to terminate his contract.

==== Stockport County (loan) ====
In December 2023 he signed on loan for Stockport County, with effect from January 2024. Bristow made 13 appearances with the Hatters, and played a role in County winning the EFL League Two title.

=== Return to Tranmere Rovers ===
On 4 June 2025, Bristow returned to League Two side Tranmere Rovers on a one-year deal. On 12 May 2026, Tranmere announced he would be leaving in the summer once his contract expired.

=== Harrogate Town ===
On 8 August 2026, Bristow joined National League club Harrogate Town.

== International career ==
As a youth, Bristow was included in the Saint Kitts and Nevis squad for the 2018 Concacaf Under-20 Championship. In November 2023, he was called up to the senior national team for a 2023–24 CONCACAF Nations League B match against Saint Lucia.

== Career statistics ==
=== Club ===
As of end of 2025–26 season

Appearances and goals by club, season and competition
Club	Season	League			National cup (Note: Includes FA Cup, U.S. Open Cup)		League cup (Note: Includes EFL Cup)		Other		Total	
Club	Season	Division	Apps	Goals	Apps	Goals	Apps	Goals	Apps	Goals	Apps	Goals
Reading	2020–21	Championship	0	0	1	0	2	0	—		3	0
Reading	2021–22	Championship	6	0	1	0	1	0	—		8	0
Reading	Total		6	0	2	0	3	0	—		11	0
Tranmere Rovers	2022–23	League Two	46	1	1	0	2	0	2 (Note: Appearance(s) in EFL Trophy)	0	51	1
Minnesota United	2023	MLS	9	0	0	0	—		3 (Note: Appearance(s) in Leagues Cup)	0	12	0
Minnesota United	2024	MLS	0	0	0	0	—		0	0	0	0
Minnesota United	Total		9	0	0	0	—		3	0	12	0
Stockport County (loan)	2023–24	League Two	13	0	0	0	0	0	0	0	13	0
Tranmere Rovers	2025–26	League Two	19	0	0	0	1	0	1	0	21	0
Career total			93	1	3	0	6	0	6	0	108	1

=== International ===
As of match played 13 November 2026

Appearances and goals by national team and year
National team	Year	Apps	Goals
Saint Kitts and Nevis	2023	1	0
Saint Kitts and Nevis	2024	2	1
Saint Kitts and Nevis	2025	0	0
Saint Kitts and Nevis	2026	3	0
Total		6	1

Scores and results list Saint Kitts and Nevis' goal tally first, score column indicates score after each Bristow goal.

List of international goals scored by Ethan Bristow
No.	Date	Venue	Opponent	Score	Result	Competition	Ref.
1	11 June 2024	Warner Park Sporting Complex, Basseterre, Saint Kitts and Nevis	Bahamas	1–0	1–0	2026 FIFA World Cup qualification	

== Honors ==
Stockport County

- EFL League Two: 2023–24
