= Hassani Dotson =

American soccer player (born 1997)

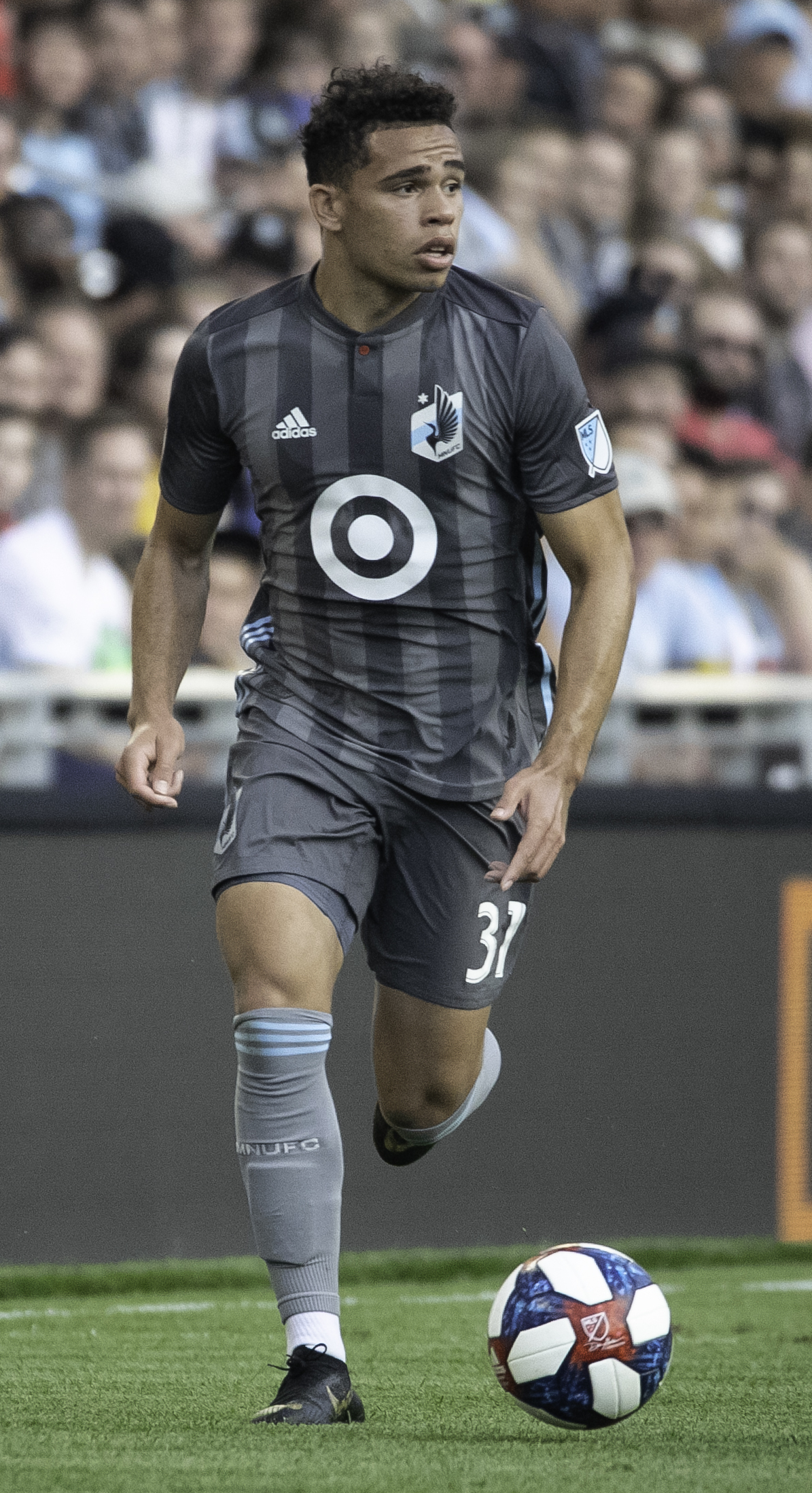
- Dotson with Minnesota United in 2019

Personal information
- Full name: Hassani Dotson Stephenson
- Date of birth: August 6, 1997 (age 29)
- Place of birth: Federal Way, Washington, US
- Height: 5 ft 11 in (1.80 m)
- Position: Midfielder

Team information
- Current team: Seattle Sounders
- Number: 31

Youth career
- 2007–2009: Crossfire Academy
- 2009–2015: Washington Premier

College career
Years	Team	Apps	(Gls)
2015–2018	Oregon State Beavers	72	(5)

Senior career*
Years	Team	Apps	(Gls)
2016	Washington Crossfire	6	(0)
2017–2018	Lane United	9	(0)
2019–2025	Minnesota United	149	(17)
2026–	Seattle Sounders	0	(0)

International career^{‡}
2019–2021	United States U23	7	(2)
- * Club domestic league appearances and goals as of 07:36, January 5, 2026 (UTC) ‡ National team caps and goals as of March 21, 2021

Hassani Dotson Stephenson (born August 6, 1997) is an American professional soccer player who plays as a midfielder for Major League Soccer club Seattle Sounders.

Dotson is typically a central midfielder but is known for being versatile and has excelled playing at left wing and right back previously for Minnesota United.

== Early career ==
Dotson attended Oregon State University, where he played college soccer for four years from 2015 to 2018, making 72 appearances, scoring five goals and tallying three assists. In his senior year he was named to the United Soccer Coaches Second Team of the All-Far West Region, made the Second Team of the All-Pac-12 Conference, and received a Pac-12 Conference Academic Honorable Mention.

While in college, Dotson also played in the Premier Development League with Washington Crossfire and Lane United FC.

== Club career ==
On January 11, 2019, Dotson was drafted 31st overall in the 2019 MLS SuperDraft by Minnesota United. He signed with Minnesota on February 16, 2019, made his professional debut on March 2 that year against the Vancouver Whitecaps, and scored his first goal on June 2 against Philadelphia.

In June 2021, Dotson signed a three-year contract with Minnesota United.

Dotson tore his ACL in April 2022 and was out until the 2023 season opener in February. In 2022 Dotson spent 3 months recovering from his ACL injury in Oregon where he lived with his in-laws, wife, and daughter who had been born earlier that year.

In March 2025, Dotson suffered a torn meniscus during a match and underwent surgery shortly thereafter. The injury sidelined him for approximately six months before he returned to action against the Colorado Rapids on September 27, 2025, after which he made six additional appearances for the remainder of the season, four of which came in the MLS Cup playoffs.

On December 16, 2025, Dotson signed with the Seattle Sounders as a free agent after the expiration of his three-year contract and subsequent 2025 extension with Minnesota United.

== International career ==
Dotson was a member of the United States under-23 team in 2019, playing in several friendlies. In 2020, he was named to the United States under-23 roster for the 2020 CONCACAF Men's Olympic Qualifying Championship. However, all games were postponed just before they were to begin in March 2020 because of the COVID-19 pandemic. When the qualifiers resumed in March 2021, he was again on the team, starting in the first game.

== Personal life ==
Dotson is married to Croatian Petra Vučković, who he met while in college. He proposed to her on the field following a 2021 game at Allianz Field. Together the couple have a daughter Gia.

== Career statistics ==
=== Club ===
As of match played December 16, 2025

Appearances and goals by club, season and competition
Club	Season	League			Playoffs		National cup		Continental		Other		Total	
Club	Season	Division	Apps	Goals	Apps	Goals	Apps	Goals	Apps	Goals	Apps	Goals	Apps	Goals
Washington Crossfire	2016	USL PDL	6	0	—		—		—		—		6	0
Lane United	2017	USL PDL	9	0	—		—		—		—		9	0
Minnesota United	2019	MLS	24	4	—		5	0	—		—		29	4
Minnesota United	2020	MLS	18	1	3	0	—		—		—		21	1
Minnesota United	2021	MLS	29	2	1	0	—		—		—		30	2
Minnesota United	2022	MLS	7	1	—		1	0	—		—		8	1
Minnesota United	2023	MLS	34	3	—		2	0	—		4 (Note: Appearances in Leagues Cup)	1	40	4
Minnesota United	2024	MLS	29	5	3	0	—		—		1	0	33	5
Minnesota United	2025	MLS	8	1	4	0	—		—		—		12	1
Minnesota United	Total		149	17	11	0	8	0	0	0	5	1	173	18
Seattle Sounders FC	2026	MLS	0	0	—		—		0	0	0	0	0	0
Career total			164	17	11	0	8	0	0	0	5	1	188	18
