= Bongokuhle Hlongwane =

South African soccer player (born 2000)

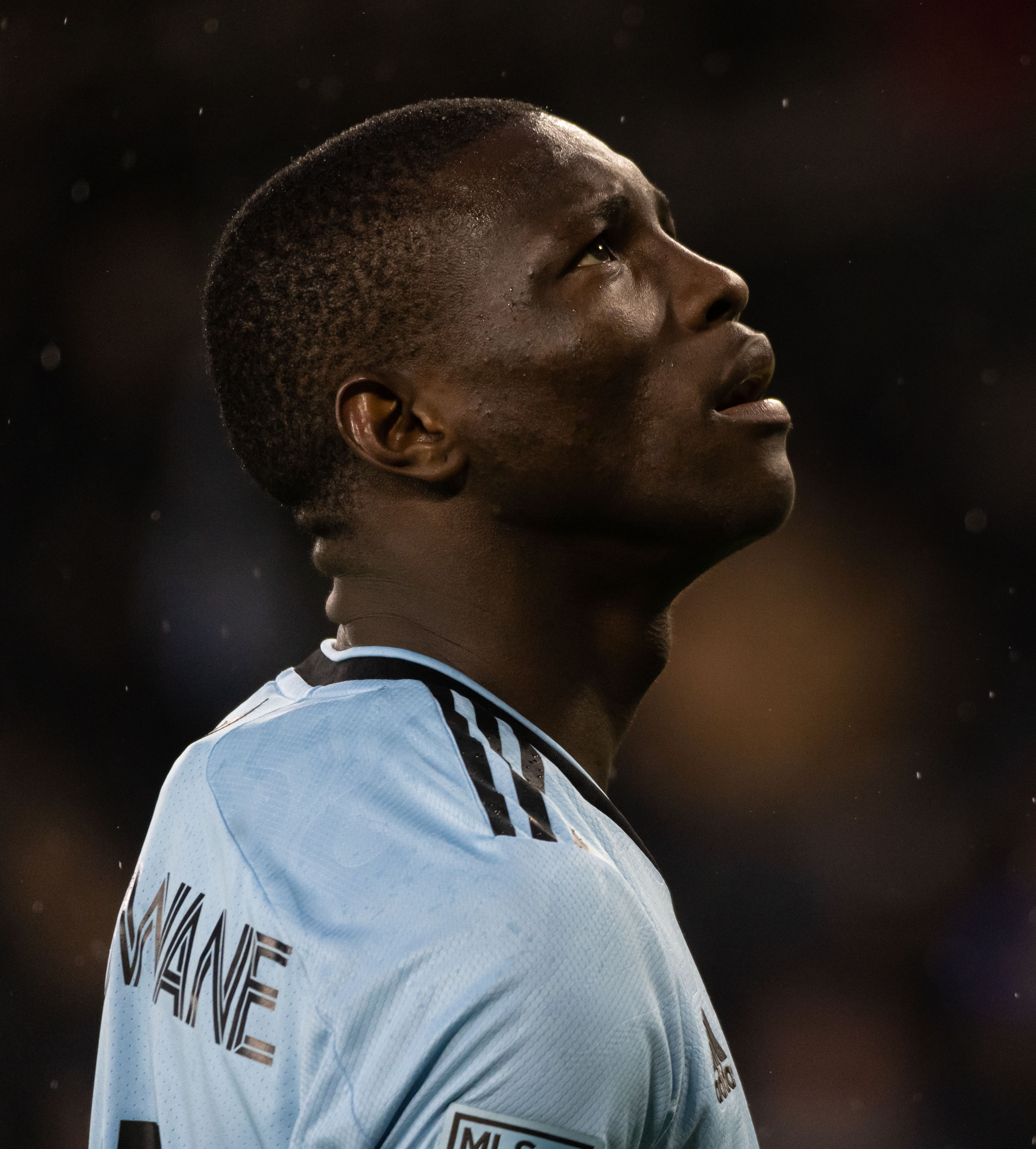
- Hlongwane with Minnesota United in 2022

Personal information
- Date of birth: 20 June 2000 (age 26)
- Place of birth: South Africa
- Height: 6 ft 1 in (1.85 m)
- Positions: Forward; winger

Team information
- Current team: Minnesota United
- Number: 21

Senior career*
Years	Team	Apps	(Gls)
- Nxamalala Fast XI
2019–2022	Maritzburg United	55	(7)
2022–	Minnesota United	133	(24)

International career^{‡}
2019–	South Africa	20	(4)
- * Club domestic league appearances and goals as of 25 November 2025 ‡ National team caps and goals as of 31 March 2026

Bongokuhle "Bongi" Hlongwane (born 20 June 2000) is a South African professional soccer player who plays as a forward for Major League Soccer club Minnesota United and the South Africa national team.

== Club career ==
=== Maritzburg United ===
Hlongwane grew up in Nxamalala studying at Umthoqotho High School, Sweetwaters, Pietermaritzburg and played for Nxamalala Fast XI in the SAFA Regional League before joining Maritzburg United's academy. He made his debut for the club in a 1–0 defeat to Orlando Pirates in April 2019 and scored his first goal for the club a month later against Tshakhuma Tsha Madzivhandila in the relegation play-offs. He was nominated for the South African Premier Division Young Player of the Season award for the 2020–21 campaign. In July 2021, he signed a new one-year contract with the club.

=== Minnesota United ===
On 5 January 2022, MLS club Minnesota United announced the signing of Hlongwane to a three-year contract with a one-year club option.

== International career ==
Hlongwane was first called up to the South African national team in July 2019, and made his international debut on 28 July as a substitute in a 3–2 defeat to Lesotho. On 8 June 2021, he made his second appearance and full debut for South Africa against Uganda and scored his first international goal following a "fortunate deflection" in a 3–2 win. On 6 September 2021, he scored against Ghana in a World Cup qualifier as South Africa won 1–0.

== Style of play ==
Hlongwane has been noted for his pace, work ethic and flair, with manager Adrian Heath commenting: “He has absolutely explosive pace, but he also looks to combine and build with his teammates. We love his raw talents, but his football IQ is exceptional."

== Personal life ==
Hlongwane holds an American green card.

== Career statistics ==
=== Club ===
As of 25 November 2025

Appearances and goals by club, season and competition
Club	Season	League			National Cup		League Cup		Other		Total	
Club	Season	Division	Apps	Goals	Apps	Goals	Apps	Goals	Apps	Goals	Apps	Goals
Maritzburg United	2018–19	SAPD	2	0	0	0	0	0	2 (Note: Appearance(s) in relegation play-off)	1	4	1
Maritzburg United	2019–20	SAPD	14	2	1	0	0	0	0	0	15	2
Maritzburg United	2020–21	SAPD	21	3	1	0	0	0	1 (Note: Appearance(s) in MTN 8)	0	23	3
Maritzburg United	2021–22	SAPD	16	1	0	0	0	0	0	0	16	1
Maritzburg United	Total		53	6	2	0	0	0	3	1	58	7
Minnesota United	2022	MLS	30	2	3	0	—		0	0	33	2
Minnesota United	2023	MLS	30	8	3	2	5	7	0	0	38	17
Minnesota United	2024	MLS	35	11	—		2	0	0	0	37	11
Minnesota United	2025	MLS	38	3	3	0	3	2	0	0	44	5
Minnesota United	Total		133	24	9	2	10	9	0	0	152	35
Career total			186	30	11	2	10	9	3	1	210	42

=== International ===
As of match played 21 November 2023

Appearances and goals by national team and year
National team	Year	Apps	Goals
South Africa	2019	1	0
South Africa	2021	7	2
South Africa	2022	4	2
South Africa	2023	7	0
Total		19	4

Scores and results list South Africa's goal tally first, score column indicates score after each Hlongwane goal.

List of international goals scored by Bongokuhle Hlongwane
No.	Date	Venue	Opponent	Score	Result	Competition	Ref.
1	10 June 2021	Orlando Stadium, Johannesburg, South Africa	Uganda	2–1	3–2	Friendly	
2	6 September 2021	FNB Stadium, Johannesburg, South Africa	Ghana	1–0	1–0	2022 FIFA World Cup qualification	
3	17 November 2022	Mbombela Stadium, Mbombela, South Africa	Mozambique	1–1	2–1	Friendly	
4	17 November 2022	Mbombela Stadium, Mbombela, South Africa	Mozambique	2–1	2–1	Friendly	
