= Emmanuel Iwe =

Nigerian footballer

Personal information
- Date of birth: September 12, 2000 (age 26)
- Place of birth: Lagos, Nigeria
- Height: 1.76 m (5 ft 9 in)
- Positions: Midfielder; forward

Youth career
- 2009–2021: Joy of the People

College career
Years	Team	Apps	(Gls)
2021	St. Cloud State Huskies	18	(6)

Senior career*
Years	Team	Apps	(Gls)
2021	Joy St. Louis Park	12	(9)
2022–2023	Minnesota United 2	39	(10)
2023	Minnesota United	3	(0)
2024–2025	SV Sandhausen	30	(3)
2025–2026	SV Waldhof Mannheim	15	(0)
- * Club domestic league appearances and goals as of May 29, 2026

Emmanuel Iwe (born September 12, 2000) is a Nigerian professional footballer who plays as a forward.

== Career ==
=== Youth ===
Iwe was born in Lagos, Nigeria, but was raised in St. Louis Park, Minnesota in the United States. He graduated from St. Louis Park High School in 2019. Iwe also played with local club side Joy of the People from 2009.

In 2018, Iwe traveled to trial with German side Werder Bremen. In early 2020, Iwe spent time with Costa Rican side Deportivo Saprissa, before having to return to the United States due to the COVID-19 pandemic.

=== College ===
In 2021, Iwe played college soccer at St. Cloud State University. In his freshman season, he made 18 appearances, scoring six goals and tallying four assists, and was named All-GLIAC Second Team.

During the 2021 season, Iwe also competed with National Premier Soccer League, side Joy St. Louis Park during their inaugural season in the NPSL. Here he scored nine goals in 12 regular season games.

=== Professional ===
On March 3, 2022, Iwe signed a professional contract with MLS Next Pro side Minnesota United 2. In his debut season, Iwe scored two goals and had two assists to his name over 16 regular season games.

Following the 2022 season, Iwe entered the 2023 MLS SuperDraft as an eligible selection. Iwe was selected 48th overall by Minnesota United, helping the team acquire his Major League Soccer rights should he sign to the club's first team roster. On March 25, 2023, Iwe signed a short-term deal with Minnesota's first team roster ahead of their fixture with Vancouver Whitecaps FC. On June 30, 2023, Iwe signed a deal with Minnesota to join their first team roster on a permanent basis.

In May 2024 German club SV Sandhausen announced Iwe would join in summer 2024, becoming the club's first signing for the 2024–25 3. Liga.
