= Ménder García =

Colombian footballer (born 1998)

Personal information
- Full name: Ménder García Torres
- Date of birth: 28 October 1998 (age 28)
- Place of birth: Tumaco, Colombia
- Height: 1.78 m (5 ft 10 in)
- Position: Forward

Team information
- Current team: Chungbuk Cheongju
- Number: 11

Senior career*
Years	Team	Apps	(Gls)
2017–2022	Once Caldas	102	(21)
2022–2023	Minnesota United	39	(4)
2024–2025	Independiente Medellín	68	(8)
2026–	Chungbuk Cheongju	19	(10)

International career^{‡}
2019–2020	Colombia U23	2	(0)
- * Club domestic league appearances and goals as of 6 August 2026 ‡ National team caps and goals as of 7 February 2020

Ménder García Torres (born 28 October 1998) is a Colombian professional footballer who plays as a forward for K League 2 club, Chungbuk Cheongju.

== Career statistics ==
=== Club ===
As of 8 October 2023

Appearances and goals by club, season and competition
Club	Season	League			Cup		Continental		Other		Total	
Club	Season	Division	Apps	Goals	Apps	Goals	Apps	Goals	Apps	Goals	Apps	Goals
Once Caldas	2017	Categoría Primera A	2	0	0	0	—		—		2	0
Once Caldas	2018	Categoría Primera A	7	0	0	0	—		—		7	0
Once Caldas	2019	Categoría Primera A	28	8	3 (Note: Appearances in the Copa Colombia)	1	—		—		31	9
Once Caldas	2020	Categoría Primera A	12	2	0	0	—		—		12	2
Once Caldas	2021	Categoría Primera A	35	6	2	0	—		—		37	6
Once Caldas	2022	Categoría Primera A	18	5	4	0	—		—		22	5
Once Caldas	Total		102	21	9	1	—		—		111	22
Minnesota United FC	2022	MLS	9	1	0	0	—		1 (Note: Appearances in the MLS Cup Playoffs)	0	10	1
Minnesota United FC	2023	MLS	30	3	2 (Note: Appearances in the U.S. Open Cup)	0	—		4 (Note: Appearances in the Leagues Cup)	0	36	3
Minnesota United FC	Total		39	4	2	0	—		5	0	46	4
Career total			141	25	11	1	0	0	5	0	157	26
