= Zaydan Bello =

Australian professional soccer

Personal information
- Date of birth: 24 June 2002 (age 24)
- Place of birth: Melbourne, Australia
- Height: 1.86 m (6 ft 1 in)
- Position: Midfielder

Team information
- Current team: Ull/Kisa
- Number: 13

Youth career
- Sporting Whittlesea
- Green Gully

Senior career*
Years	Team	Apps	(Gls)
2019–2022	Melbourne Victory NPL	19	(1)
2021–2022	Melbourne Victory	4	(0)
2023	Minnesota United FC 2	25	(1)
2023	Minnesota United	1	(0)
2025	Alta	23	(2)
2026–	Ull/Kisa	14	(2)
- * Club domestic league appearances and goals as of 15 November 2026

Zaydan Bello (born 24 June 2002) is an Australian professional soccer player who plays as a midfielder for Norwegian Second Division side Ull/Kisa. He hast previously played for Minnesota United 2, the reserve team of Major League Soccer club Minnesota United.

== Career ==
=== Melbourne Victory ===
Born in Melbourne to parents of Nigerian descent, Bello began his soccer career with Sporting Whittlesea FC and Green Gully in their junior age groups. He was signed by Melbourne Victory Youth in 2018, after impressing a scout in a trial match, and eventually was named captain in their National Premier Leagues (NPL) squad.

Bello made his first-team debut on 24 February 2022 in a 2–0 win against Wellington Phoenix at Melbourne Rectangular Stadium. Bello later signed on two-year contract with Melbourne Victory in July 2022 after making four league appearances during the 2020–21 A-League season.

=== Minnesota United ===
On 28 November 2022, Bello signed on a one-year MLS Next Pro contract with Minnesota United. He was signed on a short-term contract in March 2023 ahead of a Major League Soccer match against Vancouver Whitecaps, where he made his debut in a 1–1 draw at Allianz Field.

== Career statistics ==
=== Club ===
As of match played August 19, 2023

Appearances and goals by club, season and competition
Club	Season	League			Domestic Cup		Continental		Total	
Club	Season	Division	Apps	Goals	Apps	Goals	Apps	Goals	Apps	Goals
Melbourne Victory FC Youth	2019–20	Y-League	7	0	—		—		7	0
Melbourne Victory FC	2020–21	A-League Men	4	0	0	0	0	0	4	0
Melbourne Victory FC	2021–22	A-League Men	0	0	3	0	0	0	3	0
Melbourne Victory FC	Total		4	0	3	0	0	0	7	0
Minnesota United FC	2023	Major League Soccer	1	0	0	0	0	0	1	0
Minnesota United FC II	2023	MLS Next Pro	19	1	—		—		19	1

== Related pages ==
- Alta IF
