= Mikael Marqués =

Swedish footballer

Personal information
- Full name: Mikael Josh Marqués de Pombal Vivar
- Date of birth: 8 September 2001 (age 25)
- Place of birth: Stockholm, Sweden
- Height: 1.83 m (6 ft 0 in)
- Position: Centre-back

Team information
- Current team: Djurgårdens IF

Youth career
- 2013–2015: Oxie SK
- 2016: Kulladals FF
- 2017: Landskrona BoIS

Senior career*
Years	Team	Apps	(Gls)
2017–2020	IFK Malmö	38	(1)
2020–2021	Jönköpings Södra IF	18	(0)
2022	AFC Eskilstuna	28	(0)
2023–2024	Minnesota United	1	(0)
2023	→ Minnesota United 2	12	(0)
2024	→ Västerås SK (loan)	14	(0)
2025	Västerås SK	0	(0)
2025–	Djurgårdens IF	13	(1)
- * Club domestic league appearances and goals as of 16 October 2026

Mikael Josh Marqués de Pombal Vivar (born 8 September 2001) is a Swedish professional footballer who plays as a centre-back for Djurgårdens IF.

== Early life ==
Born in Stockholm, Marqués lived with his family in Märsta, Sweden, before they moved to Spain for six years, returning to Sweden when Marqués was 12 years old. His mother is from Angola, and his father is from Ecuador. He played youth football for Kulladals FF, Oxie SK, and Landskrona BoIS before joining IFK Malmö for whom he was promoted to the senior squad aged 16, initially playing full-back.

== Career ==
Playing for IFK Malmö Marqués played a total of 38 league matches and scored one goal for the club in the 2018 and 2019 seasons. From 2020 Marques played in the Superettan for Jönköpings Södra IF. Marqués made his Superettan debut on 16 June 2020 in a 0–1 loss against GAIS. He joined AFC Eskilstuna in the same division in January 2022. Marqués made 28 league appearances for Eskilstuna in 2022. On 17 January 2023 Marqués was confirmed as signing for Minnesota United of Major League Soccer for a reported $250,000 fee.

He made his MLS debut appearing as a substitute as Minnesota and Vancouver drew 1–1 on March 25, 2023.
