= 2018 Minnesota United FC season =

Minnesota United FC
2018 season
- Owner: Bill McGuire
- CEO: Chris Wright
- Head coach: Adrian Heath
- Stadium: TCF Bank Stadium
- Conference: 9th
- Overall: 17th
- U.S. Open Cup: Round of 16
- Top goalscorer: Darwin Quintero (11)
- Highest home attendance: 52,242
- Lowest home attendance: 18,057
- Average home league attendance: 23,902
Home colors	Away colors

The 2018 Minnesota United FC season was the ninth season of Minnesota United FC's existence and their second season in Major League Soccer, the top-tier of American soccer. United played at TCF Bank Stadium and was coached by Adrian Heath. Outside of MLS, Minnesota United also participated in the 2018 U.S. Open Cup, as well as various preseason competitions.

On June 29, 2018, player Collin Martin came out publicly as gay, making him at the time the only out gay man in any of the big five American sports leagues or any top-division professional men's national soccer leagues. He was also reported at the time to be the only active male professional soccer player to be openly gay.

== Club ==
As of July 17, 2018

No.	Name	Nationality	Position	Date of birth (age)	Signed from
Goalkeepers
24	Alex Kapp	(United States)	GK	18 October 1994 (age 31)	(United States) Atlanta United FC
28	Matt Lampson	(United States)	GK	6 September 1989 (age 37)	(United States) Chicago Fire
33	Bobby Shuttleworth	(United States)	GK	13 May 1987 (age 39)	(United States) New England Revolution
Defenders
2	Carter Manley	(United States)	DF	29 April 1996 (age 30)	(United States) Duke
3	Jérôme Thiesson	(Switzerland)	DF	6 August 1987 (age 39)	(Switzerland) FC Luzern
5	Francisco Calvo	(Costa Rica)	DF	8 July 1992 (age 34)	(Costa Rica) Saprissa
8	Marc Burch	(United States)	DF	7 May 1984 (age 42)	(United States) Colorado Rapids
14	Brent Kallman	(United States)	DF	4 October 1990 (age 35)	(United States) Minnesota United FC (NASL)
15	Michael Boxall	(New Zealand)	DF	18 August 1988 (age 38)	(South Africa) SuperSport United
22	Wyatt Omsberg	(United States)	DF	21 September 1995 (age 30)	(United States) Dartmouth
27	Bertrand Owundi	(Cameroon)	DF	15 October 1993 (age 32)	(Cameroon) Les Astres
30	Eric Miller	(United States)	DF	January 15, 1993 (age 33)	(United States) Colorado Rapids
Midfielder
6	Sam Cronin	(United States)	MF	12 December 1986 (age 39)	(United States) Colorado Rapids
7	Ibson	(Brazil)	MF	7 November 1983 (age 42)	(United States) Minnesota United FC (NASL)
10	Miguel Ibarra	(United States)	MF	15 March 1990 (age 36)	(Mexico) Club León
11	Romario Ibarra	(Ecuador)	MF	24 September 1994 (age 31)	C.D. Universidad Católica del Ecuador
13	Ethan Finlay	(United States)	MF	6 August 1990 (age 36)	(United States) Columbus Crew
16	Harrison Heath (HGP)	(England)	MF	18 May 1996 (age 30)	(United States) Atlanta United FC
17	Collin Martin	(United States)	MF	9 November 1994 (age 31)	(United States) D.C. United
18	Kevin Molino	(Trinidad and Tobago)	MF	17 June 1990 (age 36)	(United States) Orlando City SC
19	Frantz Pangop	(Cameroon)	MF	27 May 1993 (age 33)	(Cameroon) Union Douala
20	Rasmus Schuller	(Finland)	MF	18 June 1991 (age 35)	(Sweden) BK Häcken
26	Collen Warner	(United States)	MF	24 June 1988 (age 38)	(United States) Houston Dynamo
29	Maximiniano	(Brazil)	MF	8 May 1995 (age 31)	(Brazil) Fluminense FC
32	Alexi Gomez	(Peru)	MF	4 March 1993 (age 33)	(Peru) Club Universitario de Deportes
Forwards
9	Ángelo Rodríguez (DP)	(Colombia)	FW	4 April 1989 (age 37)	(Colombia) Deportes Tolima
23	Mason Toye (GA)	(United States)	FW	16 October 1998 (age 27)	(United States) Indiana
25	Darwin Quintero (DP)	(Colombia)	MF/FW	19 September 1987 (age 38)	(Mexico) Club America
99	Abu Danladi (GA)	(Ghana)	FW	18 October 1995 (age 30)	(United States) UCLA

== Transfers ==
=== Transfers in ===
Entry date	Position	No.	Player	From club	Ref.
December 10, 2017	MF	16	(England) Harrison Heath	(United States) Atlanta United FC	
January 9, 2018	MF	19	(Cameroon) Frantz Pangop	(Cameroon) Union Douala	
January 19, 2018	GK	28	(United States) Matt Lampson	(United States) Chicago Fire	
January 19, 2018	DF	27	(Cameroon) Bertrand Owundi	(Cameroon) Astres	
January 19, 2018	FW	23	(United States) Mason Toye	(United States) Indiana	
February 28, 2018	DF	2	(United States) Carter Manley	(United States) Duke	
February 28, 2018	DF	22	(United States) Wyatt Omsberg	(United States) Dartmouth	
March 30, 2018	FW	25	(Colombia) Darwin Quintero	(Mexico) Club America	
May 2, 2018	DF	30	(United States) Eric Miller	(United States) Colorado Rapids	
July 9, 2018	MF	11	(Ecuador) Romario Ibarra	(Ecuador) Universidad Católica	
July 10, 2018	FW	9	(Colombia) Ángelo Rodríguez	(Colombia) Deportes Tolima	
August 21, 2018	MF	12	(Brazil) Fernando Bob	(Brazil) Internacional	

=== MLS Re-Entry Draft ===
Round	Pick	Player	Position	Previous club	Ref
1	4	(England) Tyrone Mears	DF	(United States) Atlanta United FC	

Stage 1 of the Re-Entry Draft took place on December 15, 2017.
Stage 2 of the Re-Entry Draft took place on December 21, 2017.

=== MLS SuperDraft ===
Any player marked with a * is part of the Generation Adidas program.

Round	Pick	Player	Position	Previous club	Ref
1	7	(United States) Mason Toye*	FW	Indiana	
1	15	(United States) Wyatt Omsberg	DF	Dartmouth	
1	23	(United States) Carter Manley	DF	Duke	
2	41	(United States) Xavier Gomez	MF	Nebraska-Omaha	

1. Acquired from the Montreal Impact for $150,000 in Targeted Allocation Money
2. Acquired from the Chicago Fire for $75,000 in General Allocation Money, $100,000 in Targeted Allocation Money, and Matt Lampson for the 5th selection in the 2018 MLS SuperDraft
3. Acquired from the Toronto FC for $50,000 in Targeted Allocation Money and the 5th selection in the 2nd round (28th overall) in the 2018 MLS SuperDraft
4. Acquired from the Portland Timbers for Jeff Attinella

=== Transfers out ===
Exit date	Position	No.	Player	To club	Notes	Ref.
November 27, 2017	DF	2	(United States) Justin Davis	(United States) Nashville SC	Option Declined	
November 27, 2017	DF	4	(Jamaica) Jermaine Taylor	(United States) Austin Bold FC	Option Declined	
November 27, 2017	DF	12	(United States) Joseph Greenspan	(United States) Pittsburgh Riverhounds SC	Option Declined	
November 27, 2017	MF	15	(The Gambia) Ismaila Jome	(United States) Nashville SC	Option Declined	
November 27, 2017	DF	22	(United States) Kevin Venegas	(United States) Indy Eleven	Option Declined	
November 27, 2017	MF	23	(Venezuela) Bernardo Añor	(Venezuela) Caracas FC	Option Declined	
November 27, 2017	GK	24	(United States) Patrick McLain	(United States) Chicago Fire	Contract Expired	
November 27, 2017	FW	30	(United States) Brandon Allen	(United States) New York Red Bulls	Loan Expired	
November 27, 2017	DF	31	(France) Thomas de Villardi	(United States) Austin Bold FC	Option Declined	
February 28, 2018	DF		(Norway) Vadim Demidov	(Norway) Stabæk Fotball	Contract Buyout	
May 2, 2018	MF	12	(Scotland) Sam Nicholson	(United States) Colorado Rapids	Trade	
August 6, 2018	FW	21	(United States) Christian Ramirez	(United States) Los Angeles FC	Trade	
August 27, 2018	DF	4	(England) Tyrone Mears	(England) West Bromwich Albion F.C.	Released	

=== Loans in ===
Start date	End date	Position	No.	Player	From club	Ref.
August 10, 2017	March 9, 2018	MF	77	(Costa Rica) José Leitón	(Costa Rica) Club Sport Herediano	
February 22, 2018	End of Season	MF	29	(Brazil) Maximiniano	(Brazil) Fluminense FC	
April 11, 2018	End of Season	MF	32	(Peru) Alexi Gómez	(Peru) Club Universitario de Deportes	

=== Loans out ===
Start date	End date	Position	No.	Player	Loaned to	Ref.
December 12, 2017	December 12, 2018	MF	22	(Costa Rica) Johan Venegas	(Costa Rica) Saprissa	
December 12, 2017	August 8, 2018	FW	23	(United States) Mason Toye	(United States) Colorado Springs Switchbacks FC	
August 16, 2018	End of Season	DF	27	(Cameroon) Bertrand Owundi	(United States) Charlotte Independence	

== Friendlies ==
February 3, 2018	FIU Panthers	1–4	Minnesota United FC	Melbourne, Florida
1:00 p.m. CST	Goal		Ramirez; Molino; Ibarra	Stadium: Titan Soccer Complex

February 7, 2018	Eastern Florida Titans	0–8	Minnesota United FC	Melbourne, Florida
3:00 p.m. CST			Molino; Danladi; Toye; Ibarra; Gomez	Stadium: Titan Soccer Complex

February 10, 2018	Orlando City SC	4–1	Minnesota United FC	Sanford, Florida
10:00 am EST	Johnson; Mueller; Kljestan		Finlay	Stadium: Sylvan Lake Park; Attendance: Closed-door scrimmage

July 11, 2018	Minnesota United FC (United States)	1–2	(Costa Rica) Deportivo Saprissa	Minneapolis, Minnesota
7:00 p.m. CST	Pangop 24'	Report	Gomez (yellow card) 2'; Ramírez 19'; Villegas 85'; Torres (yellow card) 89'; Robinson (yellow card) 90+'	Stadium: TCF Bank Stadium

Win Loss Draw

=== Carolina Challenge Cup ===
Team	Pld	W	D	L	GF	GA	GD	Pts
Columbus Crew SC	3	3	0	0	7	2	+5	9
Charleston Battery	3	1	1	1	2	2	0	4
Atlanta United FC	3	0	2	1	2	4	-2	2
Minnesota United FC	3	0	1	2	2	4	-3	1

February 17, 2018 1	Charleston Battery	1–0	Minnesota United FC	Charleston, South Carolina
8:30 p.m. CST	Mueller (yellow card) 31'; Svantesson 45+1'; Okonkwo (yellow card) 56'	Report	Nicholson (yellow card) 35'; Boxall (yellow card) 45'; Warner (yellow card) 47' (yellow-red card) 83'	Stadium: MUSC Health Stadium

February 21, 2018 2	Atlanta United FC	1–1	Minnesota United FC	Charleston, South Carolina
8:30 p.m. CST	Garza (yellow card) 45'; McCann (yellow card) 58'; Williams (yellow card) 83'; Barco 85'	Report	Martin (yellow card) 31'; Molino 52' (pen.)	Stadium: MUSC Health Stadium

February 24, 2018 3	Columbus Crew SC	2−0	Minnesota United FC	Charleston, South Carolina
4:00 p.m. CST	Higuaín 32'; Zardes 37'; Mensah (yellow card) 59'	Report	Martin (yellow card) 45'; Boxall (yellow card) 65'	Stadium: MUSC Health Stadium

== Competitions ==
=== Overview ===
Competition	Record							
Competition	G	W	D	L	GF	GA	GD	Win %
MLS	34	11	3	20	49	71	−22	32.35
U.S. Open Cup	2	0	1	1	0	1	−1	0.00
Total	36	11	4	21	49	72	−23	30.56

Updated to match played 18 December 2018
Source: Competitions

=== MLS ===
Pos	Team	Pld	W	L	T	GF	GA	GD	Pts	Qualification
1	Sporting Kansas City	34	18	8	8	65	40	+25	62	MLS Cup Conference Semifinals
2	Seattle Sounders FC	34	18	11	5	52	37	+15	59	MLS Cup Conference Semifinals
3	Los Angeles FC	34	16	9	9	68	52	+16	57	MLS Cup Knockout Round
4	FC Dallas	34	16	9	9	52	44	+8	57	MLS Cup Knockout Round
5	Portland Timbers	34	15	10	9	54	48	+6	54	MLS Cup Knockout Round
6	Real Salt Lake	34	14	13	7	55	58	−3	49	MLS Cup Knockout Round
7	LA Galaxy	34	13	12	9	66	64	+2	48	
8	Vancouver Whitecaps FC	34	13	13	8	54	67	−13	47	
9	Houston Dynamo	34	10	16	8	58	58	0	38	
10	Minnesota United FC	34	11	20	3	49	71	−22	36	
11	Colorado Rapids	34	8	19	7	36	63	−27	31	
12	San Jose Earthquakes	34	4	21	9	49	71	−22	21	

Source: MLS

==== Overall table ====
Pos	Team	Pld	W	L	T	GF	GA	GD	Pts	Qualification
1	New York Red Bulls (S)	34	22	7	5	62	33	+29	71	CONCACAF Champions League
2	Atlanta United FC (C)	34	21	7	6	70	44	+26	69	CONCACAF Champions League
3	Sporting Kansas City	34	18	8	8	65	40	+25	62	CONCACAF Champions League
4	Seattle Sounders FC	34	18	11	5	52	37	+15	59	
5	Los Angeles FC	34	16	9	9	68	52	+16	57	
6	FC Dallas	34	16	9	9	52	44	+8	57	
7	New York City FC	34	16	10	8	59	45	+14	56	
8	Portland Timbers	34	15	10	9	54	48	+6	54	
9	D.C. United	34	14	11	9	60	50	+10	51	
10	Columbus Crew	34	14	11	9	43	45	−2	51	
11	Philadelphia Union	34	15	14	5	49	50	−1	50	
12	Real Salt Lake	34	14	13	7	55	58	−3	49	
13	LA Galaxy	34	13	12	9	66	64	+2	48	
14	Vancouver Whitecaps FC	34	13	13	8	54	67	−13	47	
15	Montreal Impact	34	14	16	4	47	53	−6	46	
16	New England Revolution	34	10	13	11	49	55	−6	41	
17	Houston Dynamo	34	10	16	8	58	58	0	38	CONCACAF Champions League
18	Minnesota United FC	34	11	20	3	49	71	−22	36	
19	Toronto FC	34	10	18	6	59	64	−5	36	CONCACAF Champions League
20	Chicago Fire	34	8	18	8	48	61	−13	32	
21	Colorado Rapids	34	8	19	7	36	63	−27	31	
22	Orlando City SC	34	8	22	4	43	74	−31	28	
23	San Jose Earthquakes	34	4	21	9	49	71	−22	21	

Source: MLS
Rules for classification: 1) points; 2) total wins; 3) total goal differential; 4) total goals scored; 5) disciplinary points; 6) away goals scored; 7) away goal differential; 8) coin toss or drawing of lots
(C) MLS Cup Champion; (S) Supporters' Shield

==== Results summary ====
Overall								Home						Away					
Pld	W	D	L	GF	GA	GD	Pts	W	D	L	GF	GA	GD	W	D	L	GF	GA	GD
34	11	3	20	49	71	−22	36	10	1	6	30	25	+5	1	2	14	19	46	−27

Last updated: 18 December 2018.
Source: Match reports

==== Results by round ====
Round	1	2	3	4	5	6	7	8	9	10	11	12	13	14	15	16	17	18	19	20	21	22	23	24	25	26	27	28	29	30	31	32	33	34
Stadium	A	A	H	A	H	A	A	H	H	A	H	H	H	A	A	H	H	A	H	H	H	A	H	A	A	A	A	A	H	H	A	H	H	A
Result	L	W	W	L	L	L	L	W	W	L	L	D	W	L	L	L	W	L	W	W	W	L	L	D	L	L	L	D	W	W	L	L	L	L

Updated to match(es) played on Oct 7, 2018. Source: Match reports
A = Away; H = Home; W = Win; D = Draw; L = Loss

==== Matches ====
Win Loss Draw

March 3, 2018 Match 1	San Jose Earthquakes	3–2	Minnesota United FC	San Jose, California
9:30 p.m. CST	Hoesen 27', 59'; Vako 28'; Ockford (yellow card) 71'	Report	Mears (yellow card) 25'; Molino 81', 85'	Stadium: Avaya Stadium; Attendance: 18,000; Referee: Baldomero Toledo

March 10, 2018 Match 2	Orlando City SC	1–2	Minnesota United FC	Orlando, Florida
6:30 p.m. CST	Yotún 42' (pen.); Laryea (yellow card) 56'	Report	Finlay 12', 79'; Schüller (yellow card) 88'; Toye (yellow card) 90+4'	Stadium: Orlando City Stadium; Attendance: 24,038; Referee: Sorin Stoica

March 17, 2018 Match 3	Minnesota United FC	2–1	Chicago Fire	Minneapolis, Minnesota
1:00 p.m. CDT	Ibson 55'; Nicholson 66'; Toye (yellow card) 90+2'	Report	Collier 59'; Ellis (yellow card) 60'; Tchani (yellow card) 67'	Stadium: TCF Bank Stadium; Attendance: 23,138; Referee: Alex Chilowicz

March 24, 2018 Match 4	New York Red Bulls	3–0	Minnesota United FC	Harrison, New Jersey
6:00 p.m. CDT	Muyl 15'; Rzatkowski (yellow card) 38'; Wright-Phillips 42', 78'	Report	Warner (yellow card) 39'; Ibson (yellow card) 75'	Stadium: Red Bull Arena; Attendance: 14,768; Referee: Hilario Grajeda

March 31, 2018 Match 5	Minnesota United FC	0–1	Atlanta United FC	Minneapolis, Minnesota
1:00 PM CDT	Calvo (yellow card) 90+3'	Report	González Pírez (yellow card) 1' (yellow-red card) 38'; Calvo 3' (o.g.); Guzan (yellow card) 90+1'	Stadium: TCF Bank Stadium; Attendance: 18,057; Referee: Chris Penso

April 14, 2018 Match 6	Portland Timbers	3–2	Minnesota United FC	Portland, Oregon
9:30 p.m. CDT	Powell 20'; Valeri 23'; Adi 74'; Chara (yellow card) 90+2'	Report	Schüller (yellow card) 34'; Burch (yellow card) 39'; Quintero 64'; Tuiloma 81' (o.g.); Ibson (yellow card) 86'; Boxall (yellow card) 90+2'	Stadium: Providence Park; Attendance: 21,144; Referee: José Carlos Rivero

April 22, 2018 Match 7	Seattle Sounders FC	3–1	Minnesota United FC	Seattle, Washington
3:00 p.m. CDT	Svensson 23'; Bruin 25'; Nouhou (yellow card) 58'; Leerdam (yellow card) 87'; Delem 90+5'		Ramirez 66'	Stadium: CenturyLink Field; Attendance: 39,477; Referee: Armando Villarreal

April 28, 2018 Match 8	Minnesota United FC	2–1	Houston Dynamo	Minneapolis, Minnesota
7:00 p.m. CDT	Quintero 40' (pen.); Schüller (yellow card) 65'; Ibson 70'	Report	Elis 10'; Fuenmayor (yellow card) 39'; Cerén (yellow card) 55'	Stadium: TCF Bank Stadium; Attendance: 21,574; Referee: Ted Unkel

May 5, 2018 Match 9	Minnesota United FC	1–0	Vancouver Whitecaps FC	Minneapolis, Minnesota
1:00 p.m. CDT	Quintero (yellow card) 26'; Mason Toye (red card) 50'; Miguel Ibarra 60'; Shuttleworth (yellow card) 90+1'	Report	Ali Ghazal (yellow card) 20'; José Aja (yellow card) 66'	Stadium: TCF Bank Stadium; Attendance: 19,642; Referee: Nima Saghafi

May 9, 2018 Match 10	Los Angeles FC	2–0	Minnesota United FC	Los Angeles, California
9:30 p.m. CDT	Eduard Atuesta 31' (yellow card) 40'; Kaye 37'	Report	Francisco Calvo (yellow card) 15'; Collin Martin (yellow card) 33'; Alexi Gomez (yellow card) 34'; Luiz Fernando (yellow card) 62'; Harrison Heath (yellow card) 90'	Stadium: Banc of California Stadium; Attendance: 22000; Referee: Silviu Petrescu

May 12, 2018 Match 11	Minnesota United FC	1–3	San Jose Earthquakes	Minneapolis, Minnesota
1:00 p.m. CDT	Rasmus Schuller (yellow card) 21'; Christian Ramirez 26'; Francisco Calvo (yellow card) 73'	Report	Magnus Eriksson 2' (pen.); Harold Cummings (yellow card) 40'; Shea Salinas (yellow card) 63'; Danny Hoesen 69'; Chris Wondolowski 76' (pen.); Andrew Tarbell (yellow card) 90+3'	Stadium: TCF Bank Stadium; Attendance: 19,721; Referee: Victor Rivas

May 20, 2018 Match 12	Minnesota United FC	1–1	Sporting Kansas City	Minneapolis, Minnesota
1:00 p.m. CDT	Quintero 20'; Schüller (yellow card) 51'; Luiz Fernando (yellow card) 71'		Shelton 8' (Russell) (yellow card) 58'; Sinovic (yellow card) 53'	Stadium: TCF Bank Stadium; Attendance: 23,117; Referee: Jair Marrufo

May 26, 2018 Match 13	Minnesota United FC	2–0	Montreal Impact	Minneapolis, Minnesota
7:00 p.m. CDT	Alexi Gomez (yellow card) 20'; Christian Ramirez 52'; Miguel Ibarra 58'; Francisco Calvo (yellow card) 44'	Report	Raheem Edwards (yellow card) 20'	Stadium: TCF Bank Stadium; Attendance: 21,331; Referee: Alan Kelly

June 3, 2018 Match 14	Sporting Kansas City	4–1	Minnesota United FC	Kansas City, Kansas
7:30 p.m. CDT	Sallói 9' (Croizet); Kuzain 35'; Lobato 38' (Espinoza); Diego Rubio 81' (Gerso)	Report	Mears 12' (Schüller); Maximiniano (yellow card) 48' (yellow-red card) 63'; Ibarra (yellow card) 77'	Stadium: Children's Mercy Park; Attendance: 20,422; Referee: Drew Fischer

June 23, 2018 Match 15	Colorado Rapids	3–2	Minnesota United FC	Commerce City, Colorado
8:00 p.m. CDT	Edgar Castillo 50'; Joe Mason 74'; Joe Mason (yellow card) 74'; Tommy Smith 90+7'	Report	Ibarra 20'; Christian Ramirez 65'; Shuttleworth (yellow card) 72'; Ibarra (red card) 77'	Stadium: Dick's Sporting Goods Park; Attendance: 13664; Referee: Hilario Grajeda

June 29, 2018 Match 16	Minnesota United FC	0–1	FC Dallas	Minneapolis, Minnesota
7:00 p.m. CDT	Boxall (yellow card) 11'; Toye (yellow card) 89'	Report	Hedges (yellow card) 26'; Lamah 59'; Cannon (yellow card) 79'	Stadium: TCF Bank Stadium; Attendance: 22,345; Referee: Baldomero Toledo

July 4, 2018 Match 17	Minnesota United FC	4–3	Toronto FC	Minneapolis, Minnesota
6:00 p.m. CDT	Quintero 8', 52', 57', (yellow card) 59'; Ibarra 13'; Warner (yellow card) 41'; Calvo (yellow card) 49'	Report	Morrow 42'; Giovinco 70'; Hamilton 90+4'	Stadium: TCF Bank Stadium; Attendance: 20,559; Referee: Rubiel Vazquez

July 7, 2018 Match 18	Houston Dynamo	3–0	Minnesota United FC	Houston, Texas
6:00 p.m. CDT	Senderos 36', 52', (yellow card) 41'; Lundqvist (yellow card) 72'; Elis 90+2'	Report	Mears (yellow card) 5'; Gómez (yellow card) 62'; Ibson (yellow card) 75'; Miller (yellow card) 78'; Heath (yellow card) 88'	Stadium: BBVA Compass Stadium; Attendance: 13,947; Referee: Kevin Stott

July 14, 2018 Match 19	Minnesota United FC	3–2	Real Salt Lake	Minneapolis, Minnesota
7:00 p.m. CDT	Schüller (yellow card) 21'; Warner (yellow card) 47'; Ibson 51'; Quintero 62'; Ibarra 68'	Report	M. Silva (yellow card) 34'; Plata 77', 85'	Stadium: TCF Bank Stadium; Attendance: 23,667; Referee: Alan Kelly

July 18, 2018 Match 20	Minnesota United FC	2–1	New England Revolution	Minneapolis, Minnesota
7:00 p.m. CDT	Ramirez 5'; Calvo (yellow card) 30'; Warner (yellow card) 45'; Quintero 45+1', (yellow card) 55'; Miguel Ibarra (yellow card) 62'; Boxall (yellow card) 90'	Report	Diego Fagúndez 40' (pen.); Jalil Anibaba (yellow card) 55'; Kelyn Rowe (yellow card) 75'; Juan Agudelo (yellow card) 83'	Stadium: TCF Bank Stadium; Attendance: 27,544; Referee: José Carlos Rivero

July 22, 2018 Match 21	Minnesota United FC	5–1	Los Angeles FC	Minneapolis, Minnesota
6:00 p.m. CDT	Schüller 25'; Ramirez 45'; Quintero 45+1'; Miguel Ibarra 56'; Ramirez 58'	Report	Benny Feilhaber 26'; Jordan Harvey (yellow card) 85'	Stadium: TCF Bank Stadium; Attendance: 22,739; Referee: Ted Unkel

July 28, 2018 Match 22	Vancouver Whitecaps FC	4–2	Minnesota United FC	Vancouver, British Columbia
9:00 p.m. CDT	Reyna 35'; Davies 56', 89'; Kamara 64'; Waston (yellow card) 72'	Report	Boxall (yellow card) 39'; Miller (yellow card) 50'; Ibson 82'; Danladi 87'	Stadium: BC Place; Attendance: 20,831; Referee: David Gantar

August 4, 2018 Match 23	Minnesota United FC	1–2	Seattle Sounders FC	Minneapolis, Minnesota
7:00 p.m. CDT	Quintero 19'; Ibarra (yellow card) 90+1'	Boxscore	Francis (yellow card) 78'; Lodeiro 90+1' (pen.), (yellow card) 90+2'; Bruin 90+7'	Stadium: TCF Bank Stadium; Attendance: 24,482; Referee: Drew Fischer

August 11, 2018 Match 24	LA Galaxy	2–2	Minnesota United FC	Carson, California
9:30 p.m. CDT	Alessandrini 7'; Lletget 73'	Report	Boxall (yellow card) 55', (goal) 64'; Warner (yellow card) 75'; Ángelo Rodríguez (yellow card) 78'; Romario Ibarra 84'; Calvo (yellow card) 66' (yellow-red card) 89'	Stadium: StubHub Center; Attendance: 24,891; Referee: Baldomero Toledo

August 18, 2018 Match 25	FC Dallas	2–0	Minnesota United FC	Frisco, Texas
7:00 p.m. CDT	Figueroa 44'; Gruezo (yellow card) 50'; Hedges (yellow card) 51'; Barrios 57'	Report	Martin (yellow card) 27'; Ibson (yellow card) 29'	Stadium: Toyota Stadium; Attendance: 15,107; Referee: Ismail Elfath

August 25, 2018 Match 26	Sporting Kansas City	2–0	Minnesota United FC	Kansas City, Kansas
7:30 p.m. CDT	Croizet; Diego Rubio 62' (Russell. Sinovic)	https://matchcenter.mlssoccer.com/matchcenter/2018-08-25-sporting-kansas-city-vs-minnesota-united-fc/boxscore Report	Calvo (yellow card) 50'; Boxall (yellow card) 52'	Stadium: Children's Mercy Park; Attendance: 19,345; Referee: Robert Sibiga

September 12, 2018 Match 27	D.C. United	2–1	Minnesota United FC	Washington, D.C.
6:30 p.m. CDT	Ulises Segura 65'; Darren Mattocks 69', (yellow card) 58'; Frédéric Brillant (yellow card) 84'	Report	Carter Manley (yellow card) 14'; Ángelo Rodríguez 47'; Ibson (yellow card) 77'; Frantz Pangop (yellow card) 78'	Stadium: Audi Field; Attendance: 16,114; Referee: Silviu Petrescu

September 15, 2018 Match 28	Real Salt Lake	1–1	Minnesota United FC	Sandy, Utah
8:30 p.m. CDT	Damir Kreilach 11'; Pablo Ruiz (yellow card) 66'; Corey Baird (yellow card) 80'; Sebastian Saucedo (yellow card) 90+5'	Report	Rasmus Schuller (yellow card) 84'; Miguel Ibarra 84'	Stadium: Rio Tinto Stadium; Attendance: 19,785; Referee: Chris Penso

September 22, 2018 Match 29	Minnesota United FC	3–2	Portland Timbers	Minneapolis, Minnesota
7:00 p.m. CDT	R. Ibarra 18', 36'; Boxall 43'; Maximiano (yellow card) 70'; Bob (red card) 89'	Report	Powell 55'; Blanco (yellow card) 71' (goal) 79'	Stadium: TCF Bank Stadium; Attendance: 24,525; Referee: David Gantar

September 29, 2018 Match 30	Minnesota United FC	2–1	New York City FC	Minneapolis, Minnesota
7:00 p.m. CDT	Rodríguez 20', 36'; Warner (yellow card) 45+2' (yellow-red card) 76'; Calvo (yellow card) 54'; Shuttleworth (yellow card) 89'	Report	Ring (yellow card) 21'; Wallace 90+1'	Stadium: TCF Bank Stadium; Attendance: 21,926; Referee: José Carlos Rivero

October 5, 2018 Match 31	Philadelphia Union	5–1	Minnesota United FC	Chester, Pennsylvania
6:30 p.m. CDT	Burke 8'; Bedoya 17', (yellow card) 56'; Picault 23', 44', (yellow card) 72'; Ilsinho 79'	Report; Box Score	Quintero 54'; Gómez (yellow card) 72'; Bob (yellow card) 75'	Stadium: Talen Energy Stadium; Attendance: 16,334; Referee: Allen Chapman

October 13, 2018 Match 32	Minnesota United FC	0-2	Colorado Rapids	Minneapolis, Minnesota
1:00 p.m. CDT	Miller (yellow card) 28'; Luiz Fernando (yellow card) 73'; Harrison Heath (red card) 90+14'	Report	Marlon Hairston (yellow card) 22'; Boli 61'; Jackson 90+7'; Smith (red card) 90+14'	Stadium: TCF Bank Stadium; Attendance: 19,733; Referee: Guido Gonzalez Jr.

October 21, 2018 Match 33	Minnesota United FC	1–3	LA Galaxy	Minneapolis, Minnesota
4:00 p.m. CDT	Rodríguez 53'; Boxall (yellow card) 65'; Fernando Bob (yellow card) 70'	Report	Ibrahimović 30'; Kamara 50'; Alessandrini 51', (yellow card) 70'	Stadium: TCF Bank Stadium; Attendance: 52,242; Referee: Alan Kelly

October 28, 2018 Match 34	Columbus Crew SC	3–2	Minnesota United FC	Columbus, Ohio
3:30 p.m. CDT	Zardes 11'; Zardes 49'; Zardes 83'	Report	Calvo 68'; Calvo 77'	Stadium: Mapfre Stadium; Attendance: 17,677; Referee: Robert Sibiga

=== U.S. Open Cup ===
June 6 Fourth round	FC Cincinnati	0-0 (1–3 p)	Minnesota United FC	Cincinnati, Ohio
6:30 pm CDT	Smith (yellow card) 115'	Report	Maximiniano (yellow card) 76'; Collen Warner (yellow card) 80'; Brent Kallman (yellow card) 120'	Stadium: Nippert Stadium; Attendance: 15,486; Referee: Eric Tattersall
	Penalties
	Walker (penalty missed); Sem de Wit (penalty missed); Michael Lahoud (penalty scored); Nazmi Albadawi (penalty missed)		(penalty scored) Christian Ramirez; (penalty scored) Collin Martin; (penalty scored) Brent Kallman; (penalty missed) Collen Warner

June 18 Round of 16	Houston Dynamo	1–0	Minnesota United FC	Houston, Texas
7:30 pm CDT	Manotas 47' (Lundqvist); Fuenmayor (yellow card) 89'; Seitz (yellow card) 90'	Dynamo Report	Boxall (yellow card) 67'; Kallman (yellow card) 90+3'	Stadium: BBVA Compass Stadium; Attendance: 1,930; Referee: Guido Gonzalez

== Player statistics ==
=== Top scorers ===
Rank	Position	Name	MLS	MLS Cup	U.S. Open Cup	Total
1	FW	(Colombia) Darwin Quintero	11	0	0	11
2	FW	(United States) Christian Ramirez	7	0	0	7
2	FW	(United States) Miguel Ibarra	7	0	0	7
3	MF	(Brazil) Ibson	4	0	0	4
4	MF	(Ecuador) Romario Ibarra	3	0	0	3
4	FW	(Colombia) Ángelo Rodríguez	3	0	0	3
6	MF	(Trinidad and Tobago) Kevin Molino	2	0	0	2
6	MF	(United States) Ethan Finlay	2	0	0	2
6	DF	(New Zealand) Michael Boxall	2	0	0	2
6	DF	(Costa Rica) Francisco Calvo	2	0	0	2
9	MF	(Scotland) Sam Nicholson	1	0	0	1
9	DF	(England) Tyrone Mears	1	0	0	1
9	MF	(Finland) Rasmus Schuller	1	0	0	1
9	FW	(United States) Abu Danladi	1	0	0	1
Total			44	0	0	44

=== Shutouts ===
Rank	Player	MLS	MLS Cup	U.S. Open Cup	Total
1	(United States) Bobby Shuttleworth	2	0	1	3

=== Appearances ===
No.	Pos.	Name	MLS			U.S. Open Cup			Total		
No.	Pos.	Name	Apps	Goals	Assists	Apps	Goals	Assists	Apps	Goals	Assists
2	DF	(United States) Carter Manley	1	0	0	0	0	0	1	0	0
3	DF	(Switzerland) Jérôme Thiesson	3	0	0	0	0	0	3	0	0
4	DF	(England) Tyrone Mears	3	0	0	0	0	0	3	0	0
5	DF	(Costa Rica) Francisco Calvo	3	0	0	0	0	0	3	0	0
7	MF	(Brazil) Ibson	4	1	0	0	0	0	4	1	0
8	DF	(United States) Marc Burch	1 (1)	0	0	0	0	0	1 (1)	0	0
9	FW	(Ghana) Abu Danladi	1 (1)	0	0	0	0	0	1 (1)	0	0
10	MF	(United States) Miguel Ibarra	2 (2)	0	0	0	0	0	2 (2)	0	0
12	MF	(Scotland) Sam Nicholson	4	1	0	0	0	0	4	1	0
13	MF	(United States) Ethan Finlay	4	2	1	0	0	0	4	2	1
14	DF	(United States) Brent Kallman	1 (1)	0	0	0	0	0	1 (1)	0	0
18	MF	(Trinidad and Tobago) Kevin Molino	2	2	0	0	0	0	2	2	1
19	MF	(Cameroon) Frantz Pangop	0 (1)	0	0	0	0	0	0 (1)	0	0
20	MF	(Finland) Rasmus Schüller	3	0	1	0	0	0	3	0	1
21	FW	(United States) Christian Ramirez	3 (1)	0	1	0	0	0	3 (1)	0	1
22	DF	(United States) Wyatt Omsberg	1	0	0	0	0	0	1	0	0
23	FW	(United States) Mason Toye	0 (3)	0	1	0	0	0	0 (3)	0	0
25	DF	(New Zealand) Michael Boxall	3	0	0	0	0	0	3	0	0
26	MF	(United States) Collen Warner	1 (2)	0	0	0	0	0	1 (2)	0	0
28	GK	(United States) Matt Lampson	4	0	0	0	0	0	4	0	0

=== Discipline ===
Place	Position	No.	Name	Yellow card	Red card
1	FW	23	(United States) Mason Toye	2	1
2	MF	20	(Finland) Rasmus Schüller	3	0
2	DF	5	(Costa Rica) Francisco Calvo	3	0
2	MF	7	(Brazil) Ibson	3	0
5	DF	4	(United States) Tyrone Mears	1	0
5	MF	29	(Brazil) Luiz Fernando	1	0
5	MF	17	(United States) Collin Martin	1	0
5	DF	8	(United States) Marc Burch	1	0
5	MF	16	(England) Harrison Heath	1	0
5	MF	26	(United States) Collen Warner	1	0
5	MF	32	(Peru) Alexi Gomez	1	0
5	GK	33	(United States) Shuttleworth	1	0
5	MF/FW	25	(Colombia) Quintero	1	0

=== Attendance ===
Total	Games	Average	Season highest
406,342	17	23,902	LA Galaxy (52,242)
