= 2018 MLS expansion draft =

Player draft for MLS teams

2018 MLS Expansion Draft

General information
- Date: December 11, 2018

Overview
- Expansion team: FC Cincinnati
- Expansion season: 2019

The 2018 MLS Expansion Draft was a special draft for the Major League Soccer expansion team FC Cincinnati that was held on December 11, 2018. Lists of protected rosters and draft-eligible players were released by MLS on December 10, 2018.

== Format ==
The rules for the 2018 MLS Expansion Draft as laid out by Major League Soccer.

- The five teams that had players selected by Los Angeles FC during the 2017 MLS Expansion Draft were exempt from the 2018 Expansion Draft: Seattle Sounders FC, Sporting Kansas City, San Jose Earthquakes, Columbus Crew SC, and Toronto FC.
- Existing teams were allowed to protect 11 players from their Senior, Supplemental, and Reserve Roster. Generation Adidas players and Homegrown Players on supplemental rosters were automatically protected and exempt from the expansion draft, though players who graduated from the Generation Adidas program to the senior roster at the end of the 2018 season were not exempt.
- If the player's contract expired at the end of 2018, he was considered part of the club's Senior Roster. (This includes players who have had their options declined.)
- Only one player might have been claimed from each club's non-protected roster; that team was not allowed to lose any further players.
- The expansion draft lasted five rounds, totaling five players to be drafted.

== Picks ==
Pick	MLS Team	Player	Previous Team	Trade Notes
1	FC Cincinnati	Darren Mattocks	D.C. United	
2	FC Cincinnati	Kei Kamara	Vancouver Whitecaps FC	Traded to Colorado Rapids for an International Roster slot
3	FC Cincinnati	Roland Lamah	FC Dallas	
4	FC Cincinnati	Eric Alexander	Houston Dynamo	
5	FC Cincinnati	Hassan Ndam	New York Red Bulls	

== Team-by-team breakdown ==
Here are all the players left non-protected on each MLS team's roster. FC Cincinnati's picks are marked with ✔.

=== Atlanta United FC ===
- Mikey Ambrose
- Jon Gallagher
- Jose Hernandez
- Mitch Hildebrandt
- Alec Kann
- Kevin Kratz
- Jeff Larentowicz
- Chris McCann
- Michael Parkhurst (FA)
- Oliver Shannon
- Brandon Vazquez
- Andrew Wheeler-Omiunu
- Romario Williams
- Sal Zizzo (FA)

=== Chicago Fire ===
- Jonathan Campbell
- Stefan Cleveland
- Elliot Collier
- Jorge Corrales
- Christian Dean
- Nicolas Del Grecco
- Alan Gordon (FA)
- Nicolas Hasler
- Daniel Johnson
- Patrick McLain
- Yura Movsisyan
- Richard Sánchez
- Luis Solignac
- Brandon Vincent

=== Colorado Rapids ===
- Giles Barnes
- Johan Blomberg
- Yannick Boli
- Caleb Calvert
- Edgar Castillo
- Kip Colvey
- Mike da Fonte
- Andrew Dykstra (FA)
- Shkëlzen Gashi
- Sam Hamilton
- Enzo Martinez
- Axel Sjoberg
- Danny Wilson

=== D.C. United ===
- Vytautas Andriuškevičius
- Frederic Brillant
- Nick DeLeon
- Kevin Ellis
- Jared Jeffrey
- Dane Kelly
- Taylor Kemp
- Darren Mattocks ✔
- Bruno Miranda
- Chris Odoi-Atsem
- Kofi Opare
- David Ousted
- Zoltan Stieber
- Travis Worra

=== FC Dallas ===
- Abel Aguilar
- Aníbal Chalá
- Cristian Colman
- Maynor Figueroa
- Moises Hernandez
- Roland Lamah ✔
- Marquinhos Pedroso
- Adonijah Reid
- Reto Ziegler
- Kyle Zobeck

=== Houston Dynamo ===
- Eric Alexander ✔
- Arturo Alvarez (FA)
- DaMarcus Beasley (FA)
- Eric Bird
- Leonardo (FA)
- Conor Donovan
- Boniek García
- Kevin Garcia
- Luis Gil
- Adolfo Machado
- Michael Nelson
- Dylan Remick
- Chris Seitz
- Philippe Senderos
- Mac Steeves
- Jared Watts
- Andrew Wenger

=== Los Angeles FC ===
- Steven Beitashour
- Tristan Blackmon
- Nicolás Czornomaz
- Danilo da Silva
- Benny Feilhaber (FA)
- Jordan Harvey (FA)
- Dejan Jakovic
- Luis Lopez
- Charlie Lyon
- Calum Mallace
- James Murphy
- Josh Perez
- Quillan Roberts
- Steeve Saint-Duc
- Marco Ureña

=== LA Galaxy ===
- Servando Carrasco
- Michael Ciani
- Ashley Cole
- Tomas Hilliard-Arce
- Baggio Husidic (FA)
- Perry Kitchen
- Ariel Lassiter
- João Pedro
- Chris Pontius
- Jorgen Skjelvik
- Brian Sylvestre
- Justin Vom Steeg
- Sheanon Williams (FA)

=== Minnesota United FC ===
- Fernando Bob
- Marc Burch (FA)
- Sam Cronin
- Luiz Fernando
- Alexi Gomez
- Ibson
- Alex Kapp
- Matt Lampson
- Carter Manley
- Eric Miller
- Wyatt Omsberg
- Bertrand Owundi
- Frantz Pangop
- Jerome Thiesson
- Johan Venegas
- Collen Warner (FA)

=== Montreal Impact ===
- Quincy Amarikwa (FA)
- Micheal Azira
- Rudy Camacho
- Zakaria Diallo
- Clement Diop
- Chris Duvall
- Rod Fanni
- Kyle Fisher
- Anthony Jackson-Hamel
- Matteo Mancosu
- Michael Petrasso
- Bacary Sagna
- Michael Salazar

=== New England Revolution ===
- Jalil Anibaba
- Cody Cropper
- Claude Dielna
- Guillermo Hauche
- Femi Hollinger-Janzen
- Brad Knighton
- Cristhian Machado
- Nicolas Samayoa
- Mark Segbers
- Gabriel Somi
- Chris Tierney (FA)
- Brian Wright
- Wilfried Zahibo

=== New York City FC ===
- Saad Abdul-Salaam
- Eloi Amagat
- Kwame Awuah
- Dan Bedoya
- Jo Inge Berget
- Jeff Caldwell
- Yangel Herrera
- Cedric Hountondji
- Sebastien Ibeagha
- Tommy McNamara
- Ebenezer Ofori
- Andre Rawls
- Brad Stuver
- David Villa
- Rodney Wallace (FA)

=== New York Red Bulls ===
- Anatole Abang
- Vincent Bezecourt
- Aurelien Collin (FA)
- Kyle Duncan
- Fidel Escobar
- Andreas Ivan
- Ethan Kutler
- Connor Lade
- Hassan Ndam ✔
- Tommy Redding
- Carlos Rivas
- Marc Rzatkowski
- Florian Valot
- Brian White

=== Orlando City SC ===
- R. J. Allen
- Joe Bendik
- Pierre da Silva
- Earl Edwards Jr.
- Cristian Higuita
- Will Johnson
- Sacha Kljestan
- Richie Laryea
- Stefano Pinho
- Dillon Powers
- Tony Rocha
- Lamine Sané
- Chris Schuler (FA)
- Jonathan Spector
- Scott Sutter
- Donny Toia

=== Philadelphia Union ===
- Warren Creavalle
- Borek Dockal
- Marcus Epps
- Fabinho
- Richie Marquez
- John McCarthy
- Jake McGuire
- Haris Medunjanin
- Kacper Przybylko
- Jay Simpson
- Josh Yaro

=== Portland Timbers ===
- Victor Arboleda
- Samuel Armenteros
- Dairon Asprilla
- Jack Barmby
- Julio Cascante
- Steve Clark
- Tomás Conechny
- Andrés Flores
- Jake Gleeson (FA)
- Modou Jadama
- Kendall McIntosh
- Roy Miller (FA)
- Lawrence Olum
- Alvas Powell
- Liam Ridgewell
- Bill Tuiloma
- Zarek Valentin

=== Real Salt Lake ===
- Jordan Allen
- Shawn Barry
- Tony Beltran (FA)
- Nick Besler
- Adam Henley
- David Horst (FA)
- Alex Horwath
- Ricky Lopez-Espin
- Luke Mulholland
- Taylor Peay
- Demar Phillips
- Andrew Putna
- Luis Silva (FA)
- Connor Sparrow
- Stephen Sunday

=== Vancouver Whitecaps FC ===
- José Aja
- Myer Bevan
- Marcel de Jong
- Roberto Dominguez
- Marvin Emnes
- Sean Franklin (FA)
- Ali Ghazal
- Efrain Juarez
- Kei Kamara ✔
- Stefan Marinovic
- Aaron Maund
- Jordon Mutch
- Brian Rowe
- Brek Shea (FA)
