= List of Major League Soccer transfers 2018 =

The following is a list of transfers for the 2018 Major League Soccer season that have been made during the 2017–18 MLS offseason all the way through to the roster freeze on September 15, 2018.

== Transfers ==
Date	Name	Moving from	Moving to	Mode of Transfer
November 2, 2017	(Venezuela) Jefferson Savarino	(Venezuela) Zulia	Real Salt Lake	Transfer
November 13, 2017	(Canada) Thomas Meilleur-Giguère	(Canada) Ottawa Fury	Montreal Impact	Homegrown player
November 13, 2017	(Canada) James Pantemis	(Canada) FC Montreal	Montreal Impact	Homegrown Player
November 21, 2017	(Sweden) Johan Blomberg	(Sweden) AIK	Colorado Rapids	Free
November 22, 2017	(United States) Spencer Richey	Vancouver Whitecaps FC	(United States) FC Cincinnati	Loan
November 27, 2017	(Panama) Michael Amir Murillo	(Panama) San Francisco	New York Red Bulls	Transfer
November 29, 2017	(United States) Greg Garza	(Mexico) Tijuana	Atlanta United FC	Transfer
November 30, 2017	(Venezuela) Anthony Blondell	(Venezuela) Monagas	Vancouver Whitecaps FC	Transfer
December 1, 2017	(Canada) David Norman Jr.	(Canada) Whitecaps FC 2	Vancouver Whitecaps FC	Homegrown player
December 1, 2017	(Colombia) Joel Qwiberg	(Sweden) Brommapojkarna	San Jose Earthquakes	Free
December 1, 2017	(United States) Mitch Hildebrandt	(United States) FC Cincinnati	Atlanta United FC	Free
December 6, 2017	(United States) JT Marcinkowski	(United States) Georgetown Hoyas	San Jose Earthquakes	Homegrown player
December 6, 2017	(Brazil) Artur	(Brazil) São Paulo	Columbus Crew SC	Transfer
December 7, 2017	(Colombia) Juan David Cabezas	(Colombia) Deportivo Cali	Houston Dynamo	Transfer
December 8, 2017	(Argentina) Franco Escobar	(Argentina) Newell's Old Boys	Atlanta United FC	Transfer
December 10, 2017	(France) Frédéric Brillant	New York City FC	D.C. United	Trade
December 10, 2017	(Sierra Leone) Kei Kamara	New England Revolution	Vancouver Whitecaps FC	Trade
December 10, 2017	(United States) Walker Zimmerman	FC Dallas	Los Angeles FC	Trade
December 23, 2017	(Brazil) Juninho	Chicago Fire	(Mexico) Tijuana	Return from loan
December 10, 2017	(El Salvador) Arturo Álvarez	Chicago Fire	Houston Dynamo	Trade
December 10, 2017	(Jamaica) Darren Mattocks	Portland Timbers	D.C. United	Trade
December 10, 2017	(England) Harrison Heath	Atlanta United FC	Minnesota United FC	Trade
December 10, 2017	(Cape Verde) Kévin Oliveira	Sporting Kansas City	Atlanta United FC	Trade
December 10, 2017	(Canada) Tyler Pasher	Sporting Kansas City	Atlanta United FC	Trade
December 10, 2017	(Trinidad and Tobago) Kenwyne Jones	Atlanta United FC	Sporting Kansas City	Trade
December 10, 2017	(Greece) Alexandros Tabakis	Atlanta United FC	Sporting Kansas City	Trade
December 12, 2017	(United States) Tyler Miller	Seattle Sounders FC	Los Angeles FC	Expansion Draft
December 12, 2017	(Ghana) Latif Blessing	Sporting Kansas City	Los Angeles FC	Expansion Draft
December 12, 2017	(Costa Rica) Marco Ureña	San Jose Earthquakes	Los Angeles FC	Expansion Draft
December 12, 2017	(Finland) Jukka Raitala	Columbus Crew SC	Los Angeles FC	Expansion Draft
December 12, 2017	(Canada) Raheem Edwards	Toronto FC	Los Angeles FC	Expansion Draft
December 12, 2017	(Belgium) Laurent Ciman	Montreal Impact	Los Angeles FC	Trade
December 12, 2017	(Finland) Jukka Raitala	Los Angeles FC	Montreal Impact	Trade
December 12, 2017	(Canada) Raheem Edwards	Los Angeles FC	Montreal Impact	Trade
December 13, 2017	(Venezuela) José Hernández	(Venezuela) Caracas FC	Atlanta United FC	Transfer
December 13, 2017	(Sweden) Anton Tinnerholm	(Sweden) Malmö FF	New York City FC	Free
December 13, 2017	(Honduras) Alberth Elis	(Mexico) C.F. Monterrey	Houston Dynamo	Transfer
December 13, 2017	(United States) Darlington Nagbe	Portland Timbers	Atlanta United FC	Trade
December 13, 2017	(Nigeria) Gbenga Arokoyo	Portland Timbers	Atlanta United FC	Trade
December 13, 2017	(New Zealand) Myer Bevan	(Canada) Whitecaps FC 2	Vancouver Whitecaps FC	Free
December 13, 2017	(United States) Jon Kempin	LA Galaxy	Columbus Crew SC	Trade
December 13, 2017	(New Zealand) Kip Colvey	San Jose Earthquakes	Colorado Rapids	Waiver Draft
December 13, 2017	(Senegal) Clément Diop	LA Galaxy	Montreal Impact	Waiver Draft
December 14, 2017	(United States) Khiry Shelton	New York City FC	Sporting Kansas City	Trade
December 14, 2017	(United States) Saad Abdul-Salaam	Sporting Kansas City	New York City FC	Trade
December 14, 2017	(Uruguay) Diego Rossi	(Uruguay) Peñarol	Los Angeles FC	Transfer
December 14, 2017	(United States) Jimmy Ockford	(United States) Reno 1868	San Jose Earthquakes	Free
December 14, 2017	(United States) Luis Felipe	(United States) Reno 1868	San Jose Earthquakes	Free
December 14, 2017	(United States) Chris Wehan	(United States) Reno 1868	San Jose Earthquakes	Free
December 14, 2017	(Norway) Jørgen Skjelvik	(Norway) Rosenborg BK	LA Galaxy	Free
December 14, 2017	(United States) Brad Stuver	Columbus Crew SC	New York City FC	Trade
December 14, 2017	(Costa Rica) Waylon Francis	Columbus Crew SC	Seattle Sounders FC	Trade
December 14, 2017	(United States) Jack McBean	LA Galaxy	Colorado Rapids	Trade
December 15, 2017	(France) Yohan Croizet	(Belgium) KV Mechelen	Sporting Kansas City	Transfer
December 15, 2017	(United States) Chris Seitz	FC Dallas	Houston Dynamo	Free
December 15, 2017	(United States) Brian Rowe	LA Galaxy	Vancouver Whitecaps FC	Trade
December 15, 2017	(United States) Mike Grella	New York Red Bulls	Colorado Rapids	Re-Entry Draft
December 15, 2017	(Jamaica) Tyrone Mears	Atlanta United FC	Minnesota United FC	Re-Entry Draft
December 15, 2017	(United States) Mike Grella	Colorado Rapids	Columbus Crew SC	Trade
December 15, 2017	(United States) Aaron Herrera	(United States) New Mexico Lobos	Real Salt Lake	Homegrown player
December 15, 2017	(United States) Taylor Peay	(United States) Real Monarchs	Real Salt Lake	Free
December 15, 2017	(United States) Jacob Akanyirige	(United States) San Jose Earthquakes Academy	San Jose Earthquakes	Homegrown player
December 18, 2017	(United States) Ayo Akinola	(Canada) Toronto FC II	Toronto FC	Homegrown player
December 18, 2017	(United States) David Bingham	San Jose Earthquakes	LA Galaxy	Trade
December 18, 2017	(United States) Stefano Bonomo	(United States) New York Red Bulls II	New York Red Bulls	Free
December 18, 2017	(United States) Jimmy Maurer	(United States) New York Cosmos	FC Dallas	Free
December 18, 2017	(United States) R. J. Allen	New York City FC	Orlando City SC	Trade
December 18, 2017	(Brazil) Stefano Pinho	(United States) Miami FC	Orlando City SC	Free
December 19, 2017	(Venezuela) Rolf Feltscher	(Wales) Cardiff City	LA Galaxy	Free
December 20, 2017	(United States) Brooks Lennon	(England) Liverpool	Real Salt Lake	Free
December 20, 2017	(Sweden) Magnus Eriksson	(Sweden) Djurgårdens IF	San Jose Earthquakes	Transfer
December 20, 2017	(France) Florian Valot	(United States) New York Red Bulls II	New York Red Bulls	Free
December 21, 2017	(New Zealand) Deklan Wynne	(Canada) Whitecaps FC 2	Vancouver Whitecaps FC	Free
December 21, 2017	(New Zealand) Deklan Wynne	Vancouver Whitecaps FC	Colorado Rapids	Trade
December 21, 2017	(United States) Servando Carrasco	Orlando City SC	LA Galaxy	Re-Entry Draft
December 21, 2017	(Argentina) Gonzalo Verón	New York Red Bulls	D.C. United	Re-Entry Draft
December 21, 2017	(Scotland) Calum Mallace	Seattle Sounders FC	Los Angeles FC	Re-Entry Draft
December 21, 2017	(Costa Rica) Ulises Segura	(Costa Rica) Deportivo Saprissa	D.C. United	Transfer
December 21, 2017	(Jamaica) Cory Burke	(United States) Bethlehem Steel	Philadelphia Union	Free
December 21, 2017	(Bulgaria) Anton Nedyalkov	(Bulgaria) CSKA Sofia	FC Dallas	Transfer
December 22, 2017	(Costa Rica) Johan Venegas	Minnesota United FC	(Costa Rica) Deportivo Saprissa	Loan
December 22, 2017	(Canada) Doneil Henry	(England) West Ham United	Vancouver Whitecaps FC	Free
December 22, 2017	(United States) Eric Bird	(United States) Rio Grande Valley FC Toros	Houston Dynamo	Free
December 22, 2017	(United States) Jordan Harvey	Vancouver Whitecaps FC	Los Angeles FC	Free
December 27, 2017	(The Gambia) Kekuta Manneh	Columbus Crew SC	(Mexico) Pachuca	Free
December 27, 2017	(United States) Jose Villarreal	LA Galaxy	Orlando City SC	Trade
December 27, 2017	(Libya) Mohamed El Monir	(Serbia) Partizan	Orlando City SC	Transfer
December 29, 2017	(Netherlands) Danny Hoesen	(Netherlands) FC Groningen	San Jose Earthquakes	Transfer
December 31, 2017	(Paraguay) Jesús Medina	(Paraguay) Club Libertad	New York City FC	Transfer
January 1, 2018	(Sweden) Mohammed Saeid	Colorado Rapids	(Denmark) Lyngby BK	Free
January 1, 2018	(Saint Kitts and Nevis) Atiba Harris	FC Dallas	(Mexico) Murciélagos	Free
January 1, 2018	(Suriname) Roland Alberg	Philadelphia Union	(Bulgaria) CSKA Sofia	Free
January 1, 2018	(United States) Bill Hamid	D.C. United	(Denmark) FC Midtjylland	Free
January 1, 2018	(Trinidad and Tobago) Joevin Jones	Seattle Sounders FC	(Germany) SV Darmstadt 98	Free
January 2, 2018	(Cameroon) Ambroise Oyongo	Montreal Impact	(France) Montpellier	Free
January 2, 2018	(Costa Rica) Julio Cascante	(Costa Rica) Deportivo Saprissa	Portland Timbers	Transfer
January 2, 2018	(Switzerland) Reto Ziegler	(Switzerland) Luzern	FC Dallas	Transfer
January 2, 2018	(Venezuela) Júnior Moreno	(Venezuela) Zulia	D.C. United	Transfer
January 2, 2018	(United States) Isaac Angking	(United States) New England Revolution Academy	New England Revolution	Homegrown player
January 2, 2018	(Argentina) Andrés Imperiale	San Jose Earthquakes	(Paraguay) Club Guaraní	Free
January 3, 2018	(United States) Sacha Kljestan	New York Red Bulls	Orlando City SC	Trade
January 3, 2018	(Colombia) Carlos Rivas	Orlando City SC	New York Red Bulls	Trade
January 3, 2018	(United States) Tommy Redding	Orlando City SC	New York Red Bulls	Trade
January 3, 2018	(Brazil) Alex	Houston Dynamo	(South Korea) Suwon FC	Free
January 3, 2018	(United States) Brandon Servania	(United States) Wake Forest Demon Deacons	FC Dallas	Homegrown player
January 3, 2018	(United States) Kevin Politz	(United States) Wake Forest Demon Deacons	New York Red Bulls	Homegrown player
January 3, 2018	(Spain) Alfredo Ortuño	(Spain) Real Valladolid	Real Salt Lake	Free
January 3, 2018	(United States) Benny Feilhaber	Sporting Kansas City	Los Angeles FC	Trade
January 4, 2018	(United States) Justin Davis	Minnesota United FC	(United States) Nashville SC	Free
January 4, 2018	(United States) Jaime Villarreal	LA Galaxy	(United States) Sacramento Republic	Free
January 5, 2018	(United States) Adam Grinwis	(United States) Saint Louis FC	Orlando City SC	Free
January 5, 2018	(Syria) Gabriel Somi	(Sweden) Östersunds FK	New England Revolution	Free
January 5, 2018	(United States) Corey Baird	(United States) Stanford Cardinal	Real Salt Lake	Homegrown player
January 5, 2018	(United States) Matt Van Oekel	Real Salt Lake	(United States) Oklahoma City Energy	Free
January 5, 2018	(Brazil) Matheus Silva	San Jose Earthquakes	(United States) Swope Park Rangers	Free
January 6, 2018	(Netherlands) Giliano Wijnaldum	Philadelphia Union	(Netherlands) Willem II	Free
January 8, 2018	(Canada) Sam Adekugbe	Vancouver Whitecaps FC	(Norway) Vålerenga	Transfer
January 8, 2018	(United States) Ben Mines	(United States) New York Red Bulls II	New York Red Bulls	Homegrown player
January 8, 2018	(Denmark) David Ousted	Vancouver Whitecaps FC	D.C. United	Trade
January 8, 2018	(United States) Edgar Castillo	(Mexico) C.F. Monterrey	Colorado Rapids	Loan
January 8, 2018	(England) Jack Price	(England) Wolverhampton Wanderers	Colorado Rapids	Transfer
January 9, 2018	(United States) Perry Kitchen	(Denmark) Randers	LA Galaxy	Transfer
January 9, 2018	(Venezuela) Eduardo Sosa	(Venezuela) Zamora	Columbus Crew SC	Transfer
January 9, 2018	(Wales) Adam Henley	(England) Blackburn Rovers	Real Salt Lake	Free
January 9, 2018	(Cameroon) Frantz Pangop	(Cameroon) Union Douala	Minnesota United FC	Transfer
January 9, 2018	(Canada) Jason Beaulieu	(United States) New Mexico Lobos	Montreal Impact	Homegrown player
January 9, 2018	(Jamaica) Giles Barnes	Orlando City SC	(Mexico) Club León	Free
January 9, 2018	(United States) Christian Lucatero	Houston Dynamo	(Mexico) Club Necaxa	Free
January 9, 2018	(United States) Brandon Allen	New York Red Bulls	(United States) Bethlehem Steel	Free
January 9, 2018	(Jamaica) Omar Holness	Real Salt Lake	(United States) Bethlehem Steel	Free
January 9, 2018	(Costa Rica) Christian Bolaños	Vancouver Whitecaps FC	(Costa Rica) Deportivo Saprissa	Free
January 10, 2018	(United States) Amando Moreno	(Mexico) Tijuana	New York Red Bulls	Transfer
January 10, 2018	(United States) Grant Lillard	(United States) Indiana Hoosiers	Chicago Fire	Homegrown player
January 10, 2018	(Canada) Marco Bustos	Vancouver Whitecaps FC	(Mexico) Atlético Zacatepec	Loan
January 10, 2018	(United States) Kris Reaves	(United States) Portland Pilots	FC Dallas	Homegrown player
January 10, 2018	(United States) Michael Harrington	Chicago Fire	(United States) North Carolina FC	Free
January 10, 2018	(United States) Brandon Aubrey	Toronto FC	(United States) Bethlehem Steel	Free
January 11, 2018	(France) Wilfried Zahibo	(Spain) Gimnàstic	New England Revolution	Transfer
January 11, 2018	(Benin) Cédric Hountondji	(France) Gazélec Ajaccio	New York City FC	Free
January 11, 2018	(United States) Jordan Cano	(United States) SMU Mustangs	FC Dallas	Homegrown player
January 11, 2018	(Kenya) Handwalla Bwana	(United States) Washington Huskies	Seattle Sounders FC	Homegrown player
January 11, 2018	(Portugal) João Meira	Chicago Fire	(Spain) Lorca FC	Free
January 12, 2018	(Norway) Eirik Johansen	New York City FC	(Norway) Sandefjord	Free
January 12, 2018	(United States) Joseph Greenspan	Minnesota United FC	(United States) Pittsburgh Riverhounds	Free
January 12, 2018	(Libya) Ismael Tajouri	Austria Wien	New York City FC	Transfer
January 12, 2018	(United States) Brian Sylvestre	(United States) North Carolina FC	LA Galaxy	Free
January 15, 2018	(Paraguay) Josué Colmán	(Paraguay) Cerro Porteño	Orlando City SC	Transfer
January 15, 2018	(Guinea) Hadji Barry	Orlando City SC	(United States) Swope Park Rangers	Free
January 15, 2018	(United States) Donnie Smith	New England Revolution	(United States) Charlotte Independence	Free
January 16, 2018	(Montenegro) Emrah Klimenta	(United States) Sacramento Republic	LA Galaxy	Free
January 16, 2018	(Venezuela) Alejandro Fuenmayor	(Venezuela) Carabobo FC	Houston Dynamo	Transfer
January 16, 2018	(United States) London Woodberry	New England Revolution	(United States) Nashville SC	Free
January 17, 2018	(United States) Shawn Barry	(Poland) Korona Kielce	Real Salt Lake	Free
January 17, 2018	(Peru) Andy Polo	(Mexico) Morelia	Portland Timbers	Loan
January 17, 2018	(United States) Zach Wright	(United States) North Carolina Tar Heels	Sporting Kansas City	Homegrown player
January 17, 2018	(Uruguay) Yeferson Quintana	(Uruguay) Peñarol	San Jose Earthquakes	Loan
January 17, 2018	(United States) Joey Calistri	Chicago Fire	(United States) Saint Louis FC	Free
January 18, 2018	(Mexico) Efraín Juárez	(Mexico) C.F. Monterrey	Vancouver Whitecaps FC	Transfer
January 18, 2018	(Portugal) Rafael Ramos	Orlando City SC	Chicago Fire	Trade
January 18, 2018	(United States) Cam Lindley	(United States) North Carolina Tar Heels	Orlando City SC	Homegrown player
January 18, 2018	(Cape Verde) Kévin Oliveira	Atlanta United FC	(Canada) Ottawa Fury	Free
January 18, 2018	(Canada) Michael Petrasso	(England) Queens Park Rangers	Montreal Impact	Transfer
January 18, 2018	(Argentina) Emiliano Amor	(Argentina) Vélez Sarsfield	Sporting Kansas City	Loan
January 18, 2018	(United States) Mark McKenzie	(United States) Wake Forest Demon Deacons	Philadelphia Union	Homegrown player
January 18, 2018	(United States) Conor Donovan	Orlando City SC	(United States) Rio Grande Valley FC Toros	Free
January 19, 2018	(Portugal) João Moutinho	(United States) Akron Zips	Los Angeles FC	SuperDraft
January 19, 2018	(United States) Tomas Hilliard-Arce	(United States) Stanford Cardinal	LA Galaxy	SuperDraft
January 19, 2018	(Ghana) Francis Atuahene	(United States) Michigan Wolverines	FC Dallas	SuperDraft
January 19, 2018	(Spain) Jon Bakero	(United States) Wake Forest Demon Deacons	Chicago Fire	SuperDraft
January 19, 2018	(United States) Chris Mueller	(United States) Wisconsin Badgers	Orlando City SC	SuperDraft
January 19, 2018	(United States) Mason Toye	(United States) Indiana Hoosiers	Minnesota United FC	SuperDraft
January 19, 2018	(England) Mo Adams	(United States) Syracuse Orange	Chicago Fire	SuperDraft
January 19, 2018	(Ghana) Ema Twumasi	(United States) Wake Forest Demon Deacons	FC Dallas	SuperDraft
January 19, 2018	(Republic of Ireland) Jon Gallagher	(United States) Notre Dame Fighting Irish	Atlanta United FC	SuperDraft
January 19, 2018	(Ghana) Edward Opoku	(United States) Virginia Cavaliers	Columbus Crew SC	SuperDraft
January 19, 2018	(Germany) Gordon Wild	(United States) Maryland Terrapins	Atlanta United FC	SuperDraft
January 19, 2018	(Norway) Jo Inge Berget	(Sweden) Malmö FF	New York City FC	Free
January 19, 2018	(United States) Foster Langsdorf	(United States) Stanford Cardinal	Portland Timbers	Homegrown player
January 19, 2018	(El Salvador) Darwin Cerén	San Jose Earthquakes	Houston Dynamo	Trade
January 19, 2018	(Argentina) Ezequiel Barco	(Argentina) Independiente	Atlanta United FC	Transfer
January 19, 2018	(Ghana) David Accam	Chicago Fire	Philadelphia Union	Trade
January 19, 2018	(Canada) Liam Fraser	(Canada) Toronto FC II	Toronto FC	Homegrown player
January 19, 2018	(United States) Matt Lampson	Chicago Fire	Minnesota United FC	Trade
January 19, 2018	(Nigeria) Nosa Igiebor	Vancouver Whitecaps FC	(Cyprus) Anorthosis Famagusta	Free
January 20, 2018	(France) Zakaria Diallo	(France) Brest	Montreal Impact	Free
January 20, 2018	(United States) Eric Calvillo	(United States) New York Cosmos	San Jose Earthquakes	Free
January 20, 2018	(Norway) Ola Kamara	Columbus Crew SC	LA Galaxy	Trade
January 20, 2018	(United States) Gyasi Zardes	LA Galaxy	Columbus Crew SC	Trade
January 21, 2018	(Canada) Maxime Crépeau	Montreal Impact	(Canada) Ottawa Fury	Loan
January 22, 2018	(United States) Matt Lewis	(United States) Fordham Rams	Sporting Kansas City	Homegrown player
January 22, 2018	(Algeria) Saphir Taider	(Italy) Bologna	Montreal Impact	Transfer
January 22, 2018	(United States) Chris Pontius	Philadelphia Union	LA Galaxy	Free
January 22, 2018	(Chile) Jeisson Vargas	(Chile) Universidad Católica	Montreal Impact	Transfer
January 22, 2018	(New Zealand) Tommy Smith	(England) Ipswich Town	Colorado Rapids	Transfer
January 23, 2018	(Ecuador) Cristian Penilla	(Mexico) Pachuca	New England Revolution	Loan
January 23, 2018	(United States) Aaron Kovar	Seattle Sounders FC	Los Angeles FC	Loan
January 23, 2018	(United States) Eryk Williamson	D.C. United	Portland Timbers	Homegrown player
January 24, 2018	(El Salvador) Andrés Flores	(United States) New York Cosmos	Portland Timbers	Free
January 24, 2018	(The Gambia) Modou Jadama	(United States) Tulsa Roughnecks	Portland Timbers	Free
January 24, 2018	(Argentina) Matías Laba	Vancouver Whitecaps FC	(Argentina) Estudiantes	Free
January 24, 2018	(Honduras) Luis López	(Honduras) Real España	Los Angeles FC	Transfer
January 24, 2018	(Iran) Steven Beitashour	Toronto FC	Los Angeles FC	Free
January 25, 2018	(Canada) Ballou Tabla	Montreal Impact	(Spain) FC Barcelona B	Transfer
January 25, 2018	(Mexico) Erick Torres	Houston Dynamo	(Mexico) UNAM	Transfer
January 25, 2018	(Argentina) Andrés Romero	Montreal Impact	(Argentina) San Martín	Free
January 25, 2018	(United States) Cole Seiler	Vancouver Whitecaps FC	(United States) Sacramento Republic	Free
January 25, 2018	(United States) Kevin Venegas	Minnesota United FC	(United States) Indy Eleven	Free
January 26, 2018	(Argentina) Milton Valenzuela	(Argentina) Newell's Old Boys	Columbus Crew SC	Loan
January 26, 2018	(United States) Gilbert Fuentes	(United States) San Jose Earthquakes Academy	San Jose Earthquakes	Homegrown player
January 26, 2018	(United States) Mikey Lopez	New York City FC	(United States) San Antonio FC	Free
January 27, 2018	(United States) Mix Diskerud	New York City FC	(England) Manchester City	Free
January 27, 2018	(Armenia) David Arshakyan	Chicago Fire	(Denmark) Vejle Boldklub	Free
January 27, 2018	(Slovenia) Andraž Struna	New York City FC	(Cyprus) Anorthosis Famagusta	Free
January 29, 2018	(Iraq) Justin Meram	Columbus Crew SC	Orlando City SC	Trade
January 29, 2018	(Scotland) Danny Wilson	(Scotland) Rangers	Colorado Rapids	Transfer
January 29, 2018	(Panama) Armando Cooper	Toronto FC	Universidad de Chile	Free
January 30, 2018	(England) Jack Harrison	New York City FC	(England) Manchester City	Transfer
January 30, 2018	(Canada) Cyle Larin	Orlando City SC	(Turkey) Beşiktaş	Transfer
January 30, 2018	(Norway) Magnus Wolff Eikrem	(Sweden) Malmö FF	Seattle Sounders FC	Transfer
January 30, 2018	(Canada) Dejan Jakovic	(United States) New York Cosmos	Los Angeles FC	Free
January 30, 2018	(Spain) Oriol Rosell	(Portugal) Sporting CP	Orlando City SC	Transfer
January 30, 2018	(Chile) Carlos Carmona	Atlanta United FC	(Chile) Colo Colo	Transfer
January 30, 2018	(United States) Sal Zizzo	New York Red Bulls	Atlanta United FC	Free
January 31, 2018	(Germany) Marc Rzatkowski	(Austria) Red Bull Salzburg	New York Red Bulls	Loan
January 31, 2018	(Scotland) Johnny Russell	(England) Derby County	Sporting Kansas City	Transfer
January 31, 2018	(Nigeria) Gbenga Arokoyo	Atlanta United FC	(Sweden) Kalmar FF	Free
January 31, 2018	(Jamaica) Deshorn Brown	D.C. United	(Spain) Lorca	Free
February 1, 2018	(Netherlands) Gregory van der Wiel	(Italy) Cagliari	Toronto FC	Transfer
February 1, 2018	(Argentina) Gonzalo Verón	New York Red Bulls	(Argentina) Independiente	Free
February 2, 2018	(United States) Ricardo Clark	Houston Dynamo	Columbus Crew SC	Free
February 2, 2018	(Venezuela) Cristian Cásseres Jr.	(Venezuela) Deportivo La Guaira	New York Red Bulls	Discovery signing
February 2, 2018	(Argentina) Pablo Ruiz	(Chile) San Luis de Quillota	Real Salt Lake	Discovery signing
February 2, 2018	(Egypt) Amro Tarek	(Egypt) Wadi Degla	Orlando City SC	Loan
February 2, 2018	(United States) Taylor Hunter	Houston Dynamo	(United States) Colorado Springs Switchbacks	Free
February 2, 2018	(Paraguay) Cristhian Paredes	(Mexico) Club América	Portland Timbers	Loan
February 4, 2018	(United States) Justin Schmidt	Real Salt Lake	(United States) Sacramento Republic	Free
February 4, 2018	(Norway) Øyvind Alseth	Toronto FC	(Norway) Ranheim	Free
February 5, 2018	(Canada) Mark-Anthony Kaye	(United States) Louisville City	Los Angeles FC	Transfer
February 6, 2018	(Chile) Felipe Gutierrez	(Spain) Real Betis	Sporting Kansas City	Free
February 6, 2018	(Serbia) Aleksandar Katai	(Spain) Deportivo Alavés	Chicago Fire	Loan
February 7, 2018	(Croatia) Damir Kreilach	(Germany) Union Berlin	Real Salt Lake	Transfer
February 7, 2018	(Jamaica) Oniel Fisher	Seattle Sounders FC	D.C. United	Trade
February 7, 2018	(Canada) Tyler Pasher	Atlanta United FC	(United States) Indy Eleven	Transfer
February 8, 2018	(United States) Andrew Dykstra	Sporting Kansas City	Colorado Rapids	Trade
February 9, 2018	(Sweden) Samuel Armenteros	(Italy) Benevento	Portland Timbers	Loan
February 9, 2018	(United States) Jalil Anibaba	Houston Dynamo	New England Revolution	Free
February 9, 2018	(Guatemala) Nicolas Samayoa	(United States) Florida Gulf Coast Eagles	New England Revolution	SuperDraft
February 10, 2018	(United States) Brandon Bye	(United States) Western Michigan Broncos	New England Revolution	SuperDraft
February 10, 2018	(United States) Mark Segbers	(United States) Wisconsin Badgers	New England Revolution	SuperDraft
February 12, 2018	(Colombia) Santiago Mosquera	(Colombia) Millonarios	FC Dallas	Transfer
February 12, 2018	(United States) Mike da Fonte	Colorado Rapids	(United States) Phoenix Rising	Loan
February 13, 2018	(Argentina) Yamil Asad	(Argentina) Vélez Sarsfield	D.C. United	Loan
February 13, 2018	(Cameroon) Bertrand Owundi	(Cameroon) Rainbow FC	Minnesota United FC	Free
February 13, 2018	(Brazil) Auro Jr.	(Brazil) São Paulo	Toronto FC	Loan
February 13, 2018	(United States) Alex Roldan	(United States) Seattle Redhawks	Seattle Sounders FC	SuperDraft
February 13, 2018	(United States) Jordan McCrary	(Canada) Toronto FC II	Seattle Sounders FC	Free
February 13, 2018	(United States) Dan Metzger	New York Red Bulls	(United States) Penn FC	Free
February 14, 2018	(United States) Caleb Patterson-Sewell	(United States) Jacksonville Armada	Toronto FC	Free
February 15, 2018	(United States) Eric Dick	(United States) Butler Bulldogs	Sporting Kansas City	SuperDraft
February 15, 2018	(United States) Graham Smith	(United States) Denver Pioneers	Sporting Kansas City	SuperDraft
February 15, 2018	(Ivory Coast) Xavier Kouassi	New England Revolution	(Switzerland) FC Sion	Free
February 16, 2018	(Paraguay) Kaku	(Argentina) Huracán	New York Red Bulls	Transfer
February 16, 2018	(Trinidad and Tobago) Mekeil Williams	Colorado Rapids	(United States) Richmond Kickers	Free
February 19, 2018	(Uruguay) Enzo Martínez	(United States) Charlotte Independence	Colorado Rapids	Transfer
February 19, 2018	(United States) Jack McInerney	LA Galaxy	(United States) Indy Eleven	Free
February 20, 2018	(Senegal) Lamine Sané	(Germany) Werder Bremen	Orlando City SC	Transfer
February 20, 2018	(England) Joe Mason	(England) Wolverhampton Wanderers	Colorado Rapids	Loan
February 20, 2018	(United States) Niki Jackson	(United States) Grand Canyon Antelopes	Colorado Rapids	SuperDraft
February 20, 2018	(United States) Brad Evans	Seattle Sounders FC	Sporting Kansas City	Free
February 20, 2018	(United States) Calle Brown	Houston Dynamo	Seattle Sounders FC	Free
February 21, 2018	(United States) Kyle Zobeck	(United States) New York Cosmos	FC Dallas	Free
February 21, 2018	(Ghana) Ebenezer Ofori	(Germany) VfB Stuttgart	New York City FC	Loan
February 21, 2018	(England) Oliver Shannon	(United States) Clemson Tigers	Atlanta United FC	SuperDraft
February 21, 2018	(United States) Kyle Greig	Vancouver Whitecaps FC	Saint Louis FC	Free
February 21, 2018	(Lebanon) Soony Saad	Sporting Kansas City	(United States) Indy Eleven	Free
February 22, 2018	(United States) Sean Franklin	D.C. United	Vancouver Whitecaps FC	Free
February 22, 2018	(United States) Tristan Blackmon	(United States) Pacific Tigers	Los Angeles FC	SuperDraft
February 22, 2018	(Brazil) Luiz Fernando	(Brazil) Fluminense	Minnesota United FC	Loan
February 23, 2018	(Spain) Ager Aketxe	(Spain) Athletic Bilbao	Toronto FC	Transfer
February 23, 2018	(United States) Sam Vines	(United States) Colorado Rapids Academy	Colorado Rapids	Homegrown player
February 24, 2018	(Uruguay) José Aja	Orlando City SC	Vancouver Whitecaps FC	Trade
February 27, 2018	(Colombia) Eduard Atuesta	(Colombia) Independiente Medellín	Los Angeles FC	Transfer
February 27, 2018	(United States) Sebastien Ibeagha	(United States) San Antonio FC	New York City FC	Free
February 27, 2018	(England) Joe Holland	Houston Dynamo	(United States) Pittsburgh Riverhounds	Free
February 28, 2018	(South Korea) Kim Kee-hee	(China) Shanghai Shenhua	Seattle Sounders FC	Transfer
February 28, 2018	(Japan) Ken Krolicki	(United States) Michigan State Spartans	Montreal Impact	SuperDraft
February 28, 2018	(United States) Michael Nelson	(United States) SMU Mustangs	Houston Dynamo	SuperDraft
February 28, 2018	(United States) Mac Steeves	(United States) Providence Friars	Houston Dynamo	SuperDraft
February 28, 2018	(Cameroon) Tony Tchani	Vancouver Whitecaps FC	Chicago Fire	Trade
February 28, 2018	(United States) Jeff Caldwell	(United States) Virginia Cavaliers	New York City FC	SuperDraft
February 28, 2018	(United States) Wyatt Omsberg	(United States) Dartmouth Big Green	Minnesota United FC	SuperDraft
February 28, 2018	(United States) Carter Manley	(United States) Duke Blue Devils	Minnesota United FC	SuperDraft
February 28, 2018	(Costa Rica) Diego Campos	(United States) Clemson Tigers	Chicago Fire	SuperDraft
February 28, 2018	(New Zealand) Elliot Collier	(United States) Loyola Ramblers	Chicago Fire	SuperDraft
February 28, 2018	(Belize) Michael Salazar	Montreal Impact	(Canada) Ottawa Fury	Loan
February 28, 2018	(Canada) Thomas Meilleur-Giguère	Montreal Impact	(Canada) Ottawa Fury	Loan
March 1, 2018	(United States) Luis Argudo	(United States) Wake Forest Demon Deacons	Columbus Crew SC	SuperDraft
March 1, 2018	(United States) Ben Lundgaard	(United States) Virginia Tech Hokies	Columbus Crew SC	SuperDraft
March 1, 2018	(United States) Justin Vom Steeg	(United States) LA Galaxy II	LA Galaxy	Free
March 1, 2018	(New Zealand) James Musa	Sporting Kansas City	(United States) Phoenix Rising FC	Free
March 2, 2018	(United States) Danny Musovski	(United States) UNLV Rebels	San Jose Earthquakes	SuperDraft
March 2, 2018	(Senegal) Mohamed Thiaw	(United States) Louisville Cardinals	San Jose Earthquakes	SuperDraft
March 2, 2018	(England) Jordon Mutch	(England) Crystal Palace	Vancouver Whitecaps FC	Loan
March 2, 2018	(Brazil) Felipe	New York Red Bulls	Vancouver Whitecaps FC	Trade
March 2, 2018	(United States) Tim Parker	Vancouver Whitecaps FC	New York Red Bulls	Trade
March 2, 2018	(United States) Chris Schuler	Real Salt Lake	Orlando City SC	Free
March 2, 2018	(United States) Charlie Lyon	(United States) Orange County SC	Los Angeles FC	Free
March 2, 2018	(United States) James Murphy	(England) Sheffield Wednesday	Los Angeles FC	Free
March 2, 2018	(Greece) Alexandros Tabakis	Sporting Kansas City	(United States) North Carolina FC	Free
March 7, 2018	(United States) Ben Lundgaard	Columbus Crew SC	(United States) Indy Eleven	Loan
March 16, 2018	(France) Paul Marie	(United States) FIU Panthers	San Jose Earthquakes	SuperDraft
March 23, 2018	(Sweden) Zlatan Ibrahimović	(England) Manchester United	LA Galaxy	Free
March 28, 2018	(United States) Jared Watts	Colorado Rapids	Houston Dynamo	Trade
April 26, 2018	(Sweden) Adam Lundqvist	(Sweden) IF Elfsborg	Houston Dynamo	Transfer
May 2, 2018	(Norway) Adama Diomande	(England) Hull City	Los Angeles FC	Free
June 8, 2018	(Germany) Stefan Aigner	Colorado Rapids	(Germany) KFC Uerdingen 05	Contract Terminated
June 14, 2018	(Georgia (country)) Guram Kashia	(Netherlands) Vitesse	San Jose Earthquakes	Undisclosed
June 23, 2018	(Bulgaria) Anton Nedyalkov	FC Dallas	(Bulgaria) Ludogorets Razgrad	Transfer
June 26, 2018	(Argentina) Eric Remedi	(Argentina) Banfield	Atlanta United FC	Undisclosed
June 29, 2018	(Peru) Raúl Ruidíaz	(Mexico) Morelia	Seattle Sounders FC	Transfer
July 1, 2018	(Portugal) André Horta	(Portugal) Benfica	Los Angeles FC	Transfer
July 3, 2018	(Argentina) Mauro Díaz	FC Dallas	(United Arab Emirates) Shabab Al-Ahli	Undisclosed
July 5, 2018	(Brazil) Marquinhos Pedroso	(Brazil) Figueirense	FC Dallas	Transfer
July 5, 2018	(Venezuela) Ronaldo Peña	(Venezuela) Caracas	Houston Dynamo	Undisclosed
July 9, 2018	(Ecuador) Romario Ibarra	(Ecuador) Universidad Católica	Minnesota United FC	Undisclosed
July 9, 2018	(Colombia) Carlos Rivas	New York Red Bulls	(Colombia) Atlético Nacional	Loan
July 10, 2018	(England) Wayne Rooney	(England) Everton F.C.	D.C. United	Free
July 10, 2018	(Colombia) Ángelo Rodríguez	(Colombia) Club Deportes Tolima	Minnesota United FC	Free
July 11, 2018	(Serbia) Aleksandar Katai	(Spain) Alavés	Chicago Fire	Undisclosed
July 11, 2018	(United States) Patrick Mullins	D.C. United	Columbus Crew	Trade
July 12, 2018	(Egypt) Omar Gaber	(Switzerland) FC Basel	Los Angeles FC	Transfer
July 12, 2018	(Egypt) Omar Gaber	Los Angeles FC	(Egypt) Pyramids FC	Undisclosed
July 13, 2018	(Jamaica) Giles Barnes	(Mexico) León	Colorado Rapids	Undisclosed
July 17, 2018	(Argentina) Tomás Conechny	(Argentina) San Lorenzo	Portland Timbers	Loan
July 20, 2018	(Norway) Magnus Wolff Eikrem	Seattle Sounders FC	(Norway) Molde	Waived
July 20, 2018	(Liechtenstein) Nicolas Hasler	Toronto FC	Chicago Fire	Trade
July 20, 2018	(Spain) Jon Bakero	Chicago Fire	Toronto FC	Trade
July 20, 2018	(Romania) Andreas Ivan	(Germany) SV Waldhof Mannheim	New York Red Bulls	Free
July 23, 2018	(Senegal) Dominique Badji	Colorado Rapids	FC Dallas	Trade
July 23, 2018	(United States) Kellyn Acosta	FC Dallas	Colorado Rapids	Trade
July 23, 2018	(Spain) Alfredo Ortuño	Real Salt Lake	(Spain) Albacete	Free
July 24, 2018	(Chile) Pablo Aránguiz	(Chile) Unión Española	FC Dallas	Transfer
July 30, 2018	(Nigeria) Fanendo Adi	Portland Timbers	FC Cincinnati	Transfer
July 30, 2018	(United States) Fatai Alashe	San Jose Earthquakes	FC Cincinnati	Loan
August 3, 2018	(Iraq) Justin Meram	Orlando City SC	Columbus Crew	Transfer
August 3, 2018	(England) Michael Mancienne	(England) Nottingham Forest	New England Revolution	Undisclosed
August 3, 2018	(Brazil) Danilo Silva	(Brazil) Internacional	Los Angeles FC	Loan
August 10, 2018	(Ghana) Mohammed Abu	Columbus Crew	(Norway) Vålerenga	Transfer
September 14, 2018	(Poland) Kacper Przybyłko	(Germany) 1. FC Kaiserslautern II	Philadelphia Union	Transfer
