= Bertrand (name) =

Bertrand is a given name and surname. In German, the name derives from berht ("bright") and hramn ("raven") or rand ("rim of shield").

== Given name ==
- Bertrand Baguette (born 1986), Belgian racing driver
- Bertrand Barère (1755–1841), French politician, freemason and journalist, one of the members of National Convention and leaders of Reign of Terror
- Bertrand de Bar-sur-Aube (late twelfth-early thirteenth century), French poet
- Bertrand Berry (born 1975), American football player
- Bertrand Blier (1939–2025), French director and screenwriter
- Bertrand Cantat (born 1964), French songwriter, singer, and musician
- Bertrand Clausel (1772–1842), Marshal of France, one of the principal commanders of Hundred Days War and Battle of Salamanca
- Bertrand of Comminges (1050–1126), saint and Bishop of Comminges
- Bertrand Crasson (born 1971), Belgian footballer
- Bertrand Damaisin (born 1968), French judoka
- Bertrand Delanoë (born 1950), French politician
- Bertrand Gachot (born 1962), Franco-Belgian racing driver
- Bertrand du Guesclin (c. 1320 – 1380), Constable of France
- Bertrand H. Hoak (1917–1987), New York state senator
- Bertrand de Jouvenel (1903–1987), French philosopher and political economist
- Bertrand Lacaste (1897–1994), French clergyman and bishop
- Bertrand Meheut (1951–2026), French international business executive
- Bertrand Meyer (born 1950), computer scientist and author
- Bertrand Nagymartoni (fl. 1243–1276), Aragonese-Hungarian nobleman
- Prince Bertrand of Orléans-Braganza (born 1941), member of the Imperial House of Brazil
- Bertrand Owundi (born 1993), Cameroonian footballer
- Bertrand de Poulengy (fl. c. 1392–1456), French nobleman
- Bertrand Ract-Madoux (born 1953), French Army general
- Bertrand Russell (1872–1970), British philosopher, logician, mathematician, historian, writer, essayist, social critic, political activist, and Nobel laureate
- Bertrand Serlet, a senior vice president of software engineering at Apple Inc.
- Bertrand Tavernier, a French director, screenwriter, actor, and producer

=== Fictional characters ===
- Bertrand Baudelaire, a fictional character in A Series of Unfortunate Events
- Bertrand Bell, a human fighter character in the D&D web series Critical Role
- Bertrand Caillet, the protagonist of Guy Endore's novel The Werewolf of Paris
- Bertrand, a monkey in the fable of The Monkey and the Cat
- Bertrand de Gervaise, a character in Etrian Odyssey 2 Untold: The Fafnir Knight

== Surname ==
- Alexandre Bertrand (1820–1902), French archaeologist
- Alexandre Jacques François Bertrand (1795–1831), French physician
- Aloysius Bertrand (1807–1841), French poet
- Antoine de Bertrand (c. 1540 – c. 1580), French composer
- Charles Bertrand (disambiguation), multiple people
- Christophe Bertrand (1981–2010), French composer
- Claude Bertrand (actor) (1919–1986), French actor
- Claudine Bertrand (born 1948), Canadian educator and poet
- Elie Bertrand (1713–1797), Swiss geologist, naturalist, pastor and theologian.
- Émile Bertrand (1844–1909), French mineralogist
- Gabriel Bertrand (1867–1962), French biochemist and bacteriologist
- Gustave Bertrand (1896–1976), French intelligence officer
- Guy Bertrand (broadcaster) (born 1954), French Canadian linguist and radio/TV personality
- Guy Bertrand (chemist), professor at UC Riverside and carbene specialist
- Guy Bertrand (lawyer), Québec lawyer and political activist
- Henri Gatien Bertrand (1773–1844), French general (First Empire)
- Henri Bertrand (entomologist) (1892–1978), French entomologist
- Jacob Bertrand (born 2000), American actor
- JD Bertrand (born 2000), American football player
- Jean-Jacques Bertrand (1916–1973), Premier of Quebec (1968–1970)
- Jean-Michel Bertrand (1943–2008), French politician
- John Bertrand (Australian sailor) (born 1946), Australian yachtsman
- Joseph Bertrand (1822–1900), French mathematician
- Julie Winnefred Bertrand (1891–2007), one-time oldest recognized woman in the world
- Léon Bertrand (born 1951), French politician
- Leopoldo Bertrand (born 1943), Spanish military engineer and politician
- Lorenzo Bertrand (1886–1924), Canadian ice hockey player
- Louis Bertrand (disambiguation), multiple people with the name
- Marcel Alexandre Bertrand (1847–1907), French geologist
- Marcheline Bertrand, (1950–2007) American actress of French-Canadian descent and mother of Angelina Jolie
- Marianne Bertrand, Belgian economist at the University of Chicago
- Paul Bertrand (1879–1944), French botanist
- Plastic Bertrand (born 1958), Belgian singer
- Raymond Bertrand de Got (1264–1314), became Pope Clement V
- René Bertrand (1971–2025), Argentine actor and theater director
- Robert Bertrand (1953–2022), Canadian politician
- Robert R. Bertrand (1906–2002), American sound engineer
- Rosaire Bertrand (born 1936), Canadian politician
- Ryan Bertrand (born 1989), English footballer
- Sylvia Judith Bertrand (1930–2009), Dominican civil servant
- Xavier Bertrand (born 1965), French politician
- Yann Arthus-Bertrand (born 1946), French photographer
- Yannick Bertrand (born 1980), French alpine skier
- Yves Bertrand (1944–2013), French intelligence officer
