= Maximiniano =

Maximiniano is a Portuguese surname. Notable people with the surname include:

- Luiz Fernando Ferreira Maximiniano (born 1995), Brazilian footballer
