= Louis Bertrand =

Louis Bertrand may refer to:

- Louis Bertrand (saint) (1526–1581), Spanish Dominican priest
- Louis Bertrand (mathematician) (1731–1812), Swiss mathematician
- Louis Bertrand (Quebec seigneur) (1779–1871), Canadian politician and businessman
- Aloysius Bertrand (Louis Jacques Napoléon Bertrand, 1807–1841), French poet
- Louis Bertrand (novelist) (1866–1941), French novelist, historian, and essayist
- Louis A. Bertrand (1808–1875), early French Mormon leader, translator of first French Book of Mormon
- Louis Bertrand (politician) (1856–1943), Belgian politician, author, and Minister of State

== See also ==
- Louis Bertrand Castel (1688–1757), French mathematician
- Louis Bertrand Goodall (1851–1935), American politician
