= Charles Bertrand =

Charles Bertrand may refer to:

- Charles Bertrand (politician) (1824–1896), Quebec businessman, seigneur and political figure
- Charles Bertrand (ice hockey) (born 1991), French ice hockey player
- Charles Eugène Bertrand (1851–1917), French botanist, paleobotanist and geologist
