= Paul Bertrand =

French paleobotanist

Paul Charles Édouard Bertrand
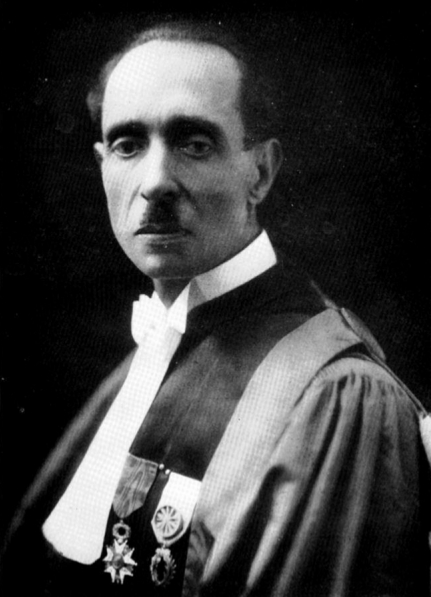
- Paul Bertrand.
- Born: 10 July 1879; Loos-lez-Lille
- Died: 24 February 1944 (aged 64); Paris
- Occupation: paleobotanist

Paul Charles Édouard Bertrand (10 July 1879, Loos-lez-Lille – 24 February 1944, Paris) was a French paleobotanist. He was the son of botanist Charles Eugène Bertrand (1851–1917).

He studied at the University of Lille, receiving his degree in natural sciences in 1903 and his doctorate of sciences in 1909. In 1910 he became a lecturer in paleontology and director of the Lille "coal museum". In 1927 he attained the chair of paleobotany, a distinction created especially for Bertrand. From 1938 to 1944 (year of death), he served as chair of "Anatomie comparée des végétaux actuels et fossiles" at the Muséum national d'histoire naturelle in Paris.

His work largely dealt with the comparative anatomy of fossil plants, comparative morphological investigations of living and fossil plants, and studies involving Carboniferous biostratigraphy. He made significant contributions in his research on the structure of early ferns and fernlike plants. He is credited with defining the taxa Etapteris and Metaclepsydropsis.
