= Lorenzo Bertrand =

Canadian ice hockey player

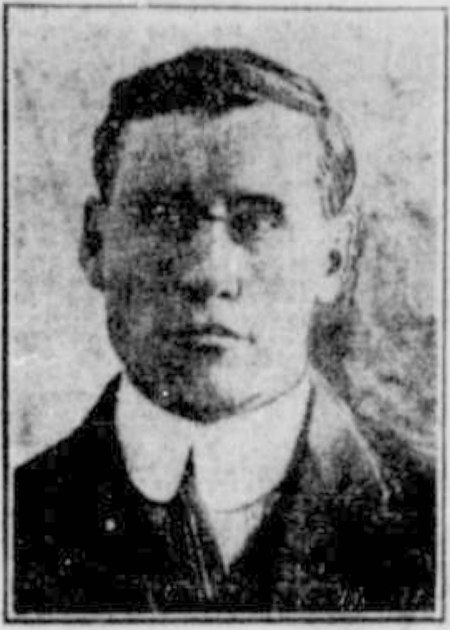
- Bertrand c. 1911
- Born: November 27, 1886 Hull, Quebec, Canada
- Died: February 29, 1924 (aged 37) Hull, Quebec, Canada
- Position: Right wing
- Played for: Montreal Canadiens
- Playing career: 1906–1923

William Lorenzo Bertrand (November 27, 1886 – February 29, 1924) was a Canadian professional ice hockey player. He played with the Montreal Canadiens of the National Hockey Association in the 1910–11 and 1913–14 seasons, playing one game in each season.

Bertrand was born in Hull, Quebec, the son of Narcisse Bertrand. He was a veteran of World War I, and worked in Detroit. He died at his sister's home in Hull, in 1924.
