= Charles Eugène Bertrand =

Charles Eugène Bertrand (2 January 1851, in Paris – 18 August 1917) was a French botanist, paleobotanist and geologist. He is remembered for his research involving the formation of coal.

He studied sciences in Paris, where he had as influences botanist Joseph Decaisne and plant physiologist Pierre Paul Deherain. In 1874 he obtained his doctorate in sciences, and was later appointed professor of botany at the University of Lille (1878). From 1881 to 1887, he was head of the Archives botaniques du nord de la France.

In 1878 he became a member of the Société botanique de France. He was the father of botanist Paul Charles Édouard Bertrand (1879-1944).

== Partial list of publications ==
- Anatomie comparée des tiges et des feuilles chez les gnétacies et chez les conifères, 1874 - Comparative anatomy of the stems and leaves of Gnetaceae with conifers.
- Traité de botanique à l'usage des aspirants au grade de licencié ès sciences naturelles et au grade d'agrégé des lycées pour les sciences naturelles, 1881.
- Recherches sur les tmésiptéridées, 1883 - Research of Tmesipteridaceae.
- Nouvelles remarques sur le Kerosene shale de la Nouvelle-Galles du Sud, 1895 - New remarks on kerosene shale of New South Wales.
- Les charbons humiques et les charbons de purins, 1898 - Humic coal, etc.
