= Louis Bertrand (mathematician) =

Swiss mathematician

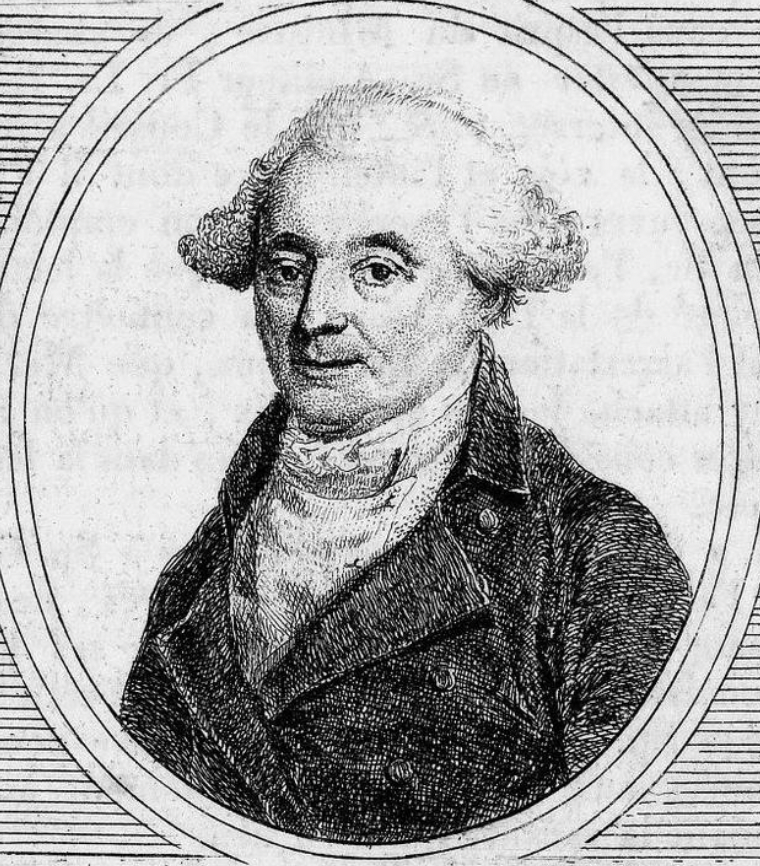
Louis Bertrand

Louis Bertrand (French pronunciation: [lwi bɛʁtʁɑ̃]; 3 October 1731 – 15 May 1812) was a Genevan mathematician.

== Biography ==
Bertrand was born on 3 October 1731 in Geneva, Republic of Geneva, the son of Antoine Bertrand, a merchant and banker, and Madeleine Lafont. He studied in Geneva and under Leonhard Euler in Berlin. Bertrand was a professor of mathematics at the University of Geneva from 1761 to 1795, and was its rector in 1783. He became a member of Geneva's Council of Two Hundred in 1784, and served in the National Assembly in 1795 during the Genevan revolutionary period.

In 1778, Bertrand published the work Developpement nouveau de la partie elementaire des mathematiques, which included a demonstration of Euclid's postulates that gained fame before the rise of non-Euclidean geometry and influenced most of the elementary geometry treatises of the 19th century. In 1774, he published the De l'instruction publique in open opposition to Horace Bénédict de Saussure's Projet de réforme pour le Collège de Genève. He worked, besides in Geneva, also in Berlin, Bern, and London. Bertrand died on 15 May 1812 in Geneva, aged 80.

== Works ==
- Developpement nouveau de la partie elementaire des mathematiques (in French). Vol. 1. Genève: Isaac Bardin, Imprimerie de la Societé Typografique. 1778.
- Developpement nouveau de la partie elementaire des mathematiques (in French). Vol. 2. Genève: Isaac Bardin, Jean Pierre Bonnant. 1778.
