= Ángelo Rodríguez =

Colombian footballer (born 1989)

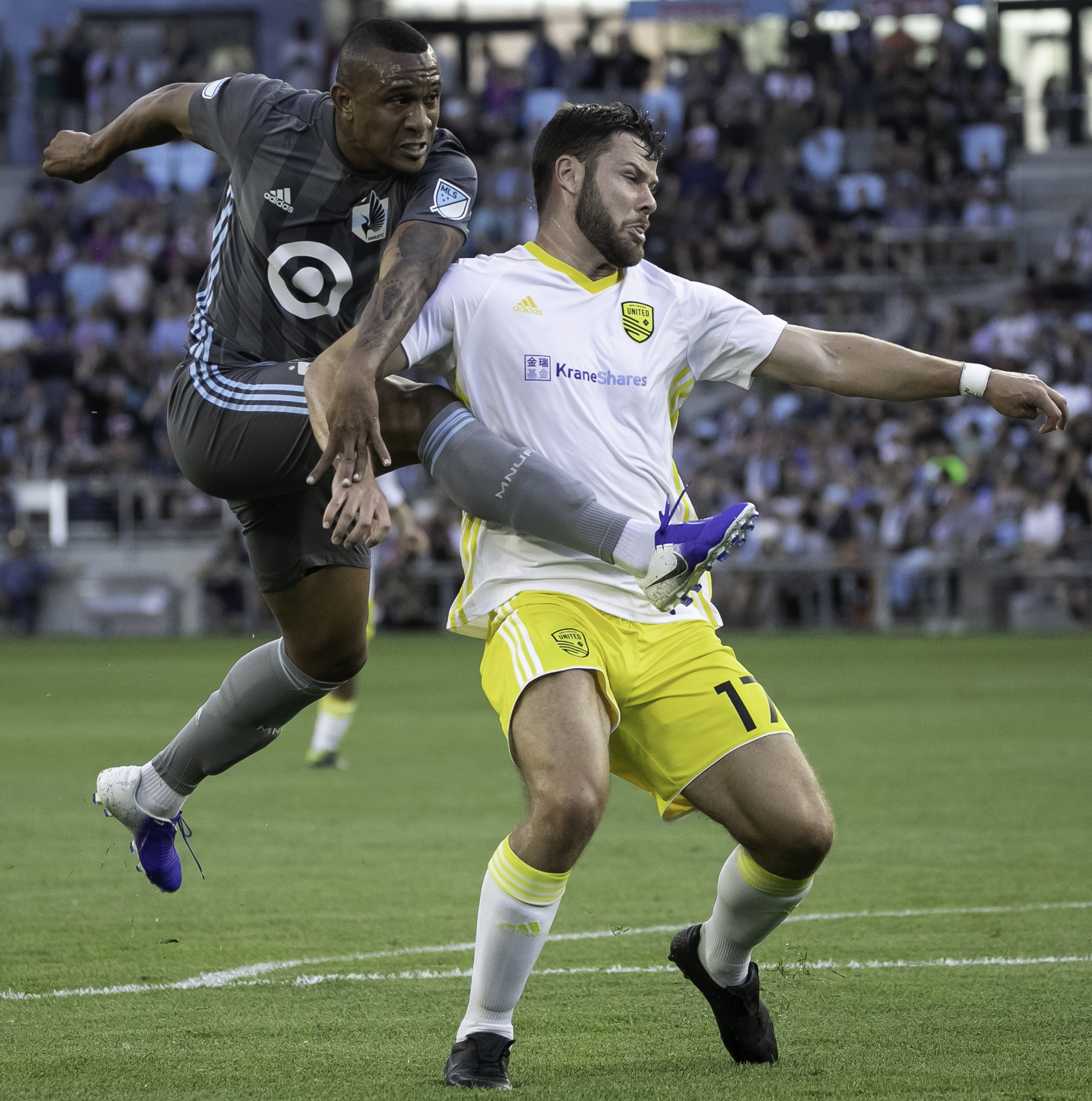

Personal information
- Full name: Ángelo José Rodríguez Henry
- Date of birth: 4 April 1989 (age 37)
- Place of birth: San Andrés Island, Colombia
- Height: 1.81 m (5 ft 11 in)
- Position: Forward

Team information
- Current team: Santa Fe
- Number: 9

Senior career*
Years	Team	Apps	(Gls)
2010	Depor Aguablanca	?	(?)
2011	Atlético Nacional	6	(0)
2012	Real Cartagena	29	(7)
2013	Alianza Petrolera	33	(3)
2014	Uniautónoma	9	(0)
2014–2015	Envigado	28	(8)
2015	Independiente Medellín	8	(0)
2016	Envigado	16	(5)
2016–2018	Deportes Tolima	64	(28)
2018–2019	Minnesota United	39	(9)
2020–2022	Deportivo Cali	90	(18)
2023	Deportivo Pereira	30	(7)
2024	Goiás	13	(2)
2025–	Santa Fe	34	(3)
- * Club domestic league appearances and goals as of 11 December 2025

Ángelo José Rodríguez Henry (born 4 April 1989) is a Colombian professional footballer who plays as forward for Santa Fe.

== Career ==
On 10 July 2018 Rodríguez signed with Minnesota United, becoming the club's second ever designated-player signing. On 24 January 2020 Rodríguez and Minnesota mutually parted ways.
