= Matt Lampson =

American soccer player (born 1989)

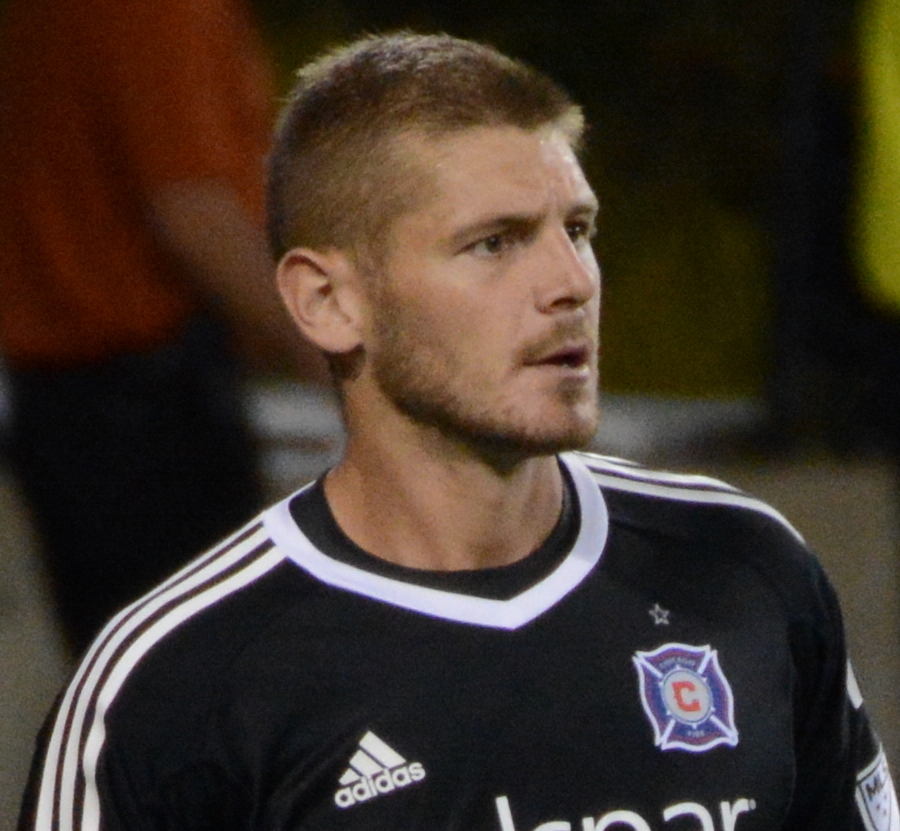
- Lampson with Chicago Fire in 2017

Personal information
- Full name: Matthew Tyler Lampson
- Date of birth: September 6, 1989 (age 37)
- Place of birth: Cleveland, Tennessee, United States
- Height: 6 ft 3 in (1.91 m)
- Position: Goalkeeper

Youth career
- 2008: Columbus Crew

College career
Years	Team	Apps	(Gls)
2008	Northern Illinois Huskies		
2009–2011	Ohio State Buckeyes		

Senior career*
Years	Team	Apps	(Gls)
2012–2015	Columbus Crew	16	(0)
2015	→ Pittsburgh Riverhounds (loan)	1	(0)
2015	→ Charlotte Independence (loan)	6	(0)
2016–2018	Chicago Fire	35	(0)
2018	Minnesota United	9	(0)
2019	LA Galaxy	1	(0)
2020–2021	Columbus Crew	0	(0)
2021	Hartford Athletic	2	(0)

Managerial career
- 2022–2024: Houston Dash (assistant)
- * Club domestic league appearances and goals

Matt Lampson (born September 6, 1989) is an American former soccer player who played as a goalkeeper.

== Career ==
=== Youth and college ===
A team captain during his senior season, Lampson was the two-time MVP at St. Charles Preparatory School in 2006 and 2007, and was named to the 2007 All-Central Catholic League Team. The Hilliard, Ohio native helped the Crew Soccer Academy advance to the Academy National Finals in 2008. Lampson started on the Academy Great Lakes team and was a five-time Ohio South State Champion.

After beginning his collegiate career at Northern Illinois University, Lampson transferred to Ohio State in 2009. He appeared in 56 career matches for the Buckeyes, posting a school record 0.86 goals against average and 24 shutouts, which ranks second on OSU's all-time list.

From 2009 to 2011, Lampson earned numerous accolades including Co-Big Ten Freshman of the Year in 2009, Big Ten All-Freshman Team in 2009, All All-Big Ten First Team in 2010, All-Big Ten Second Team in 2009 and 2011, All-Big Ten Fall Academic Team in 2011, Academic All-Big Ten in 2011, and eight Big Ten Defensive Player of the Week honors.

=== Professional ===
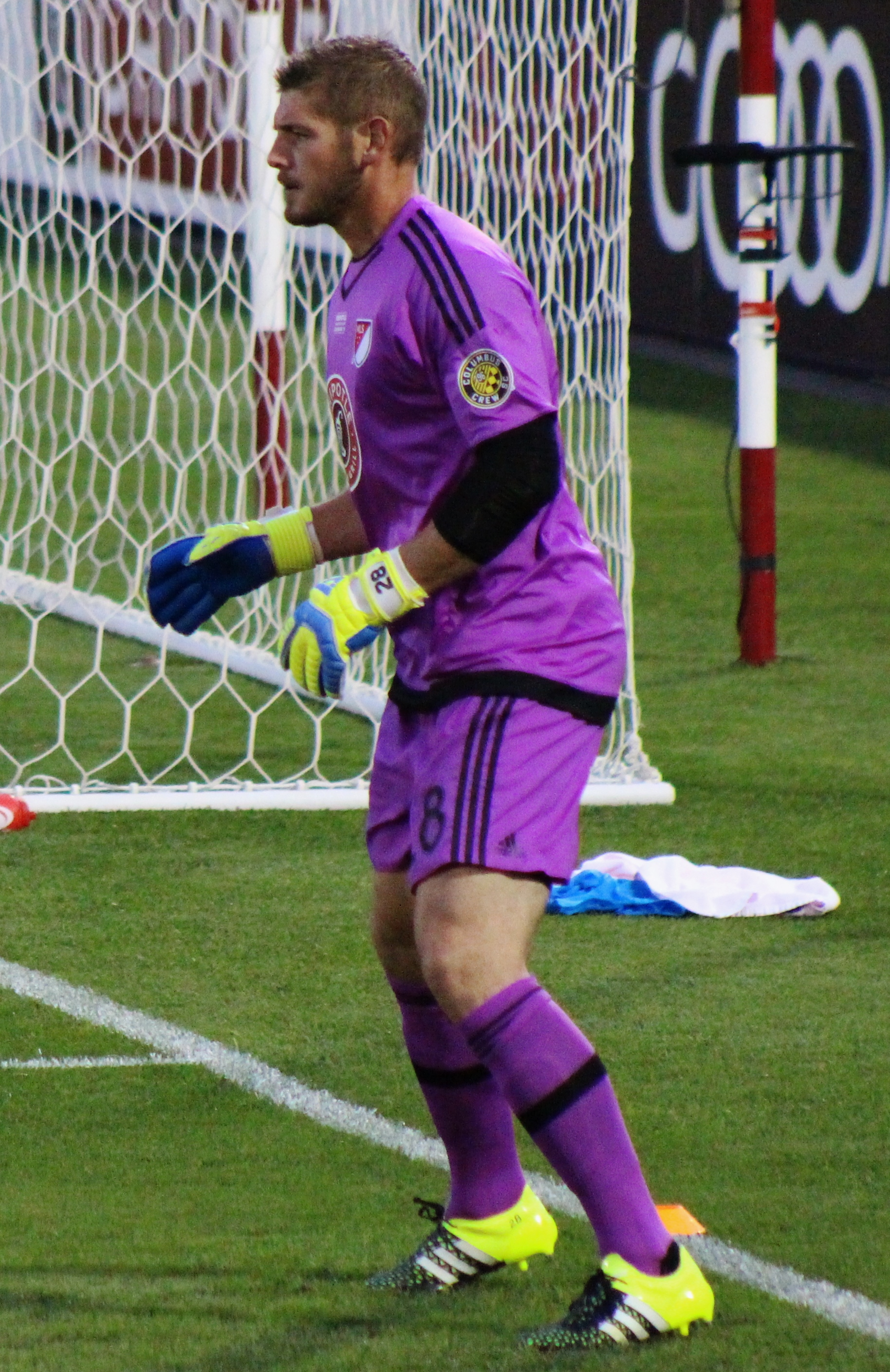
Lampson representing Columbus Crew at the 2015 MLS Homegrown Game

Lampson became the second Homegrown signing in Columbus Crew history on December 15, 2011.

During his rookie season in 2012, Lampson appeared in three matches, earning one start. Lampson made seven saves and recorded two wins on Aug 25 and Sept. 15. Lampson additionally appeared in the Crew's friendly against Stoke City and started the U.S. Open Cup match against the Dayton Dutch Lions on May 29.

Lampson started 13 games in goal and compiled a 7-6-0 record with a 1.38 goals against average en route to five shutouts in 2013. Lampson started his first game of the season on July 7 against the Timbers and earned the shutouts in the 1–0 win. From Aug 3 through Oct 19, Lampson appeared in 12 consecutive games in goal, recording four or more saves in five straight matches. Lampson additionally appeared in one Open Cup game, a 2–1 win over the Dayton Dutch Lions on May 29. Named OhioHealth Humanitarian of the Year.

In 2014, took part in the inaugural Chipotle MLS Homegrown Game, starting and featuring in the first half of a 0–0 draw against the Portland Timbers U-23s. Played the full 90 minutes of the Crew's international friendly against Crystal Palace FC on July 23. Named the OhioHealth Humanitarian of the Year for the second consecutive season.

In 2015 Lampson was loaned to USL side Pittsburgh Riverhounds for one game, a 2–1 loss at Charlotte on June 13. Was subsequently loaned to the Charlotte Independence for six games. Made his Independence debut against Saint Louis FC on July 4. Made seven saves against Louisville City FC in a 1–0 loss on July 11. Tallied four saves and earned the shutout in a 0–0 draw at Rochester on July 18. Had his second-straight shutout against FC Montreal on July 24. Took part in the Chipotle MLS Homegrown Game for the second consecutive year.

On December 7, 2015, it was announced that Lampson's contract with Columbus had run out and that the club would not be renewing his contract. Lampson was eligible for the 2015 MLS Re-Entry draft but was not selected.

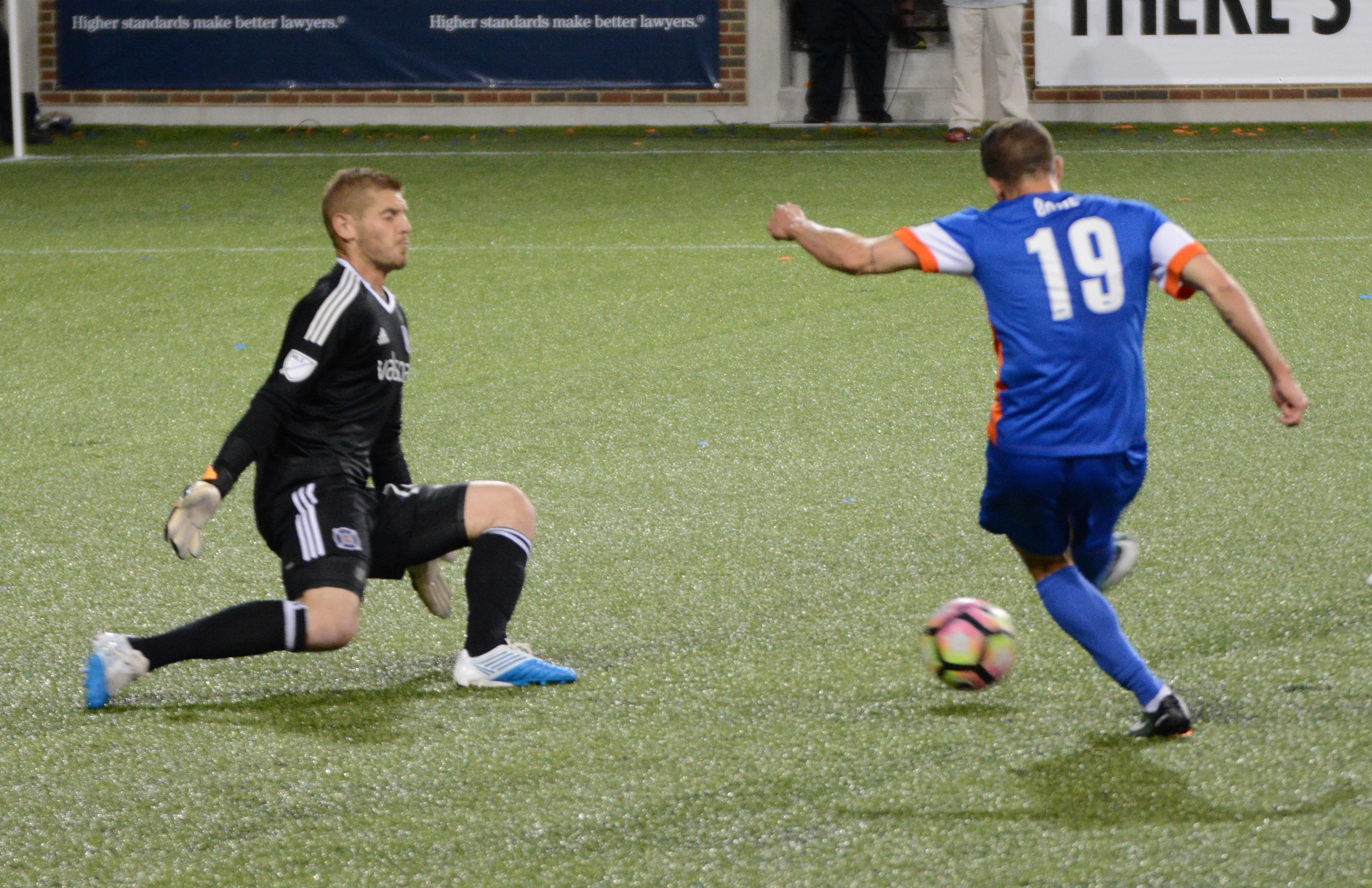
Lampson blocks a shot from FC Cincinnati's Corben Bone in the 2017 U.S. Open Cup.

Following a trial during preseason, Lampson signed with the Fire on February 26, 2016. Lampson appeared in the first nine matches of the season for the Men in Red, and set a club record shutout streak for 411 minutes from March 19 through April 16. Made a career-high nine saves against the Vancouver Whitecaps on May 11. During this same match, he had a violent collision with Japanese player Masato Kudo, which resulted in the latter's jaw breaking. Started all four games in the Fire's run to the semifinal round of the Lamar Hunt U.S. Open Cup. Blocked two shots during a penalty kick shootout in the fourth round match against Indy Eleven on June 15. On November 3 was named MLS WORKS Humanitarian of the Year.

On January 19, 2018, Lampson was traded by Chicago to Minnesota United FC. Lampson was released by Minnesota at the end of their 2018 season. Lampson earned the starting role in preseason and played the first nine games of the season for the Loons. On November 8, Lampson was named 2018 MLS WORKS Humanitarian of the Year, becoming the only player in league history to win the award multiple times.

Lampson was selected by LA Galaxy in the second-round of the 2018 MLS Re-Entry Draft on December 20, 2018. Lampson appeared in his first competitive match for the Galaxy on July 23 in the quarterfinal round of the Leagues Cup. After the Galaxy and Club Tijuana finished regulation at 2-2, Lampson saved three penalty kicks in the ensuing shootout to propel his side into the semifinal round.

Lampson was named MLS WORKS Humanitarian of the Year for the third time on Oct. 22.

On December 12, 2019, it was announced that Lampson would make his return to his hometown club, signing with Columbus Crew as a free agent. Lampson was part of the Columbus squad that won the 2020 MLS Cup.

Following his release from Columbus, Lampson joined USL Championship side Hartford Athletic on September 24, 2021.

== Coaching career ==
Lampson joined the Houston Dash as an assistant coach in May 2022. He was fired in March 2024 for violating the NWSL's anti-fraternization policy and coach code of conduct.

== The LampStrong Foundation ==
Lampson founded The LampStrong Foundation, Inc., a 501(c)(3) non-profit organization, in 2014. The mission of The LampStrong Foundation is to provide financial, emotional and motivational support to cancer patients, survivors, and their families.

The LampStrong Foundation hosted the inaugural Kick Cancer Cup on Aug. 23, 2015. Local celebrities, former Ohio State athletes and Crew SC players attended the event, which raised more than $20,000.

The foundation announced a partnership with the Lurie Children's Hospital on April 24, which will help promote health, wellness, and physical fitness among children and teenagers in the midst of cancer treatments.

The LampStrong Foundation donated $20,000 to Lurie Children's, the funds of which will go towards the HOT (Hematology, Oncology, and Transplant) Healthy Living Initiative.

On March 29, 2019, the foundation announced a $5,000 donation to the University of Minnesota Masonic Children's Hospital's University of Minnesota Foundation. The Foundation used the initial funding to kick start social programming focused on the adolescent and young adult cancer patient with the goal of creating opportunities for patients connect, feel less isolated and provide shared emotional support, which is accomplished through both in and out of hospital events.

== Personal life ==
Lampson announced his relationship with professional soccer player Katie Stengel in January 2026.

== Career statistics ==
=== Club ===
As of the end of 2020 season

Appearances and goals by club, season and competition
Club	Season	League			National Cup		Continental		Other		Total	
Club	Season	Division	Apps	Goals	Apps	Goals	Apps	Goals	Apps	Goals	Apps	Goals
Columbus Crew	2012	MLS	3	0	1	0	—		—		4	0
Columbus Crew	2013	MLS	13	0	1	0	—		—		14	0
Columbus Crew	2014	MLS	0	0	—		—		0	0	0	0
Columbus Crew	2015	MLS	0	0	0	0	—		0	0	0	0
Pittsburgh Riverhounds (loan)	2015	USL	1	0	—		—		—		1	0
Charlotte Independence (loan)	2015	USL	6	0	—		—		—		6	0
Chicago Fire	2016	MLS	11	0	4	0	—		—		15	0
Chicago Fire	2017	MLS	24	0	2	0	—		1 (Note: Appearance(s) in MLS Cup Playoffs)	0	27	0
Chicago Fire	Total		35	0	6	0	0	0	1	0	42	0
Minnesota United	2018	MLS	9	0	0	0	—		—		9	0
LA Galaxy	2019	MLS	1	0	1	0	2 (Note: Appearance(s) in Leagues Cup)	0	0	0	4	0
Columbus Crew	2020	MLS	0	0	—		—		0	0	0	0
Columbus Crew	Total		16	0	2	0	0	0	0	0	18	0
Career total			68	0	9	0	2	0	1	0	80	0

== Honors ==
Columbus Crew

- MLS Cup: 2020

Individual

- MLS Humanitarian of the Year Award: 2016, 2018, 2019
