= Fernando Bob =

Brazilian footballer (born 1988)

Personal information
- Full name: Fernando Paixão da Silva
- Date of birth: 7 January 1988 (age 38)
- Place of birth: Cabo Frio, Brazil
- Height: 1.80 m (5 ft 11 in)
- Position: Defensive midfielder

Youth career
- 2002–2007: Fluminense

Senior career*
Years	Team	Apps	(Gls)
2006–2014	Fluminense	41	(0)
2008	→ Paulista (loan)	0	(0)
2009	→ Boavista (loan)	10	(0)
2009	→ Avaí (loan)	2	(0)
2012	→ Atlético Goianiense (loan)	5	(0)
2012–2013	→ Vitória (loan)	12	(0)
2013–2014	→ Ponte Preta (loan)	39	(0)
2015	SEV Hortolândia	0	(0)
2015	→ Ponte Preta (loan)	34	(3)
2016–2018	Internacional	17	(1)
2017	→ Ponte Preta (loan)	19	(0)
2018	Minnesota United	7	(0)
2020–2021	Boavista	21	(0)
- * Club domestic league appearances and goals as of 4 November 2018

Fernando Paixão da Silva (born 7 January 1988), known as Fernando Bob, is a Brazilian footballer who plays as a defensive midfielder.

== Club career ==
Fernando Bob was born in Cabo Frio, Rio de Janeiro, and was a Fluminense youth graduate. He made his first team – and Série A – debut on 23 August 2006, starting in a 3–0 away loss against Palmeiras.

After loans at Paulista, Boavista and Avaí, Fernando Bob returned to Flu for the 2010 campaign and contributed sparingly as his side lifted the league title. Subsequent loans at Atlético Goianiense, Vitória and Ponte Preta followed, and he signed a permanent contract with the latter on 2 January 2015.

On 12 February 2015, Fernando Bob signed a three-year contract with fellow top tier club Internacional. On 16 February 2017, after being rarely used, he returned to Ponte on loan until the end of the year.

On 21 August 2018, Fernando Bob joined Minnesota United FC in Major League Soccer. Bob was released by Minnesota at the end of their 2018 season.

== Career statistics ==
As of 26 November 2017

Club	Season	League			State League		Cup		Continental		Other		Total	
Club	Season	Division	Apps	Goals	Apps	Goals	Apps	Goals	Apps	Goals	Apps	Goals	Apps	Goals
Fluminense	2006	Série A	1	0	—		—		—		—		1	0
Fluminense	2008	Série A	3	0	—		—		—		—		3	0
Fluminense	2010	Série A	20	0	—		—		—		—		20	0
Fluminense	2011	Série A	17	0	6	0	—		2 (Note: Appearance(s) in Copa Libertadores)	0	—		25	0
Fluminense	Subtotal		41	0	6	0	—		2	0	—		49	0
Paulista (loan)	2008	Série C	0	0	2	0	—		—		—		2	0
Boavista (loan)	2009	Carioca	—		10	0	—		—		—		10	0
Avaí (loan)	2009	Série A	2	0	—		—		—		—		2	0
Atlético Goianiense (loan)	2012	Série A	5	0	14	1	4	0	—		—		23	1
Vitória (loan)	2012	Série B	12	0	—		—		—		—		12	0
Vitória (loan)	2013	Série A	0	0	1	0	—		—		3 (Note: Appearance(s) in Copa do Nordeste)	0	4	0
Vitória (loan)	Subtotal		12	0	1	0	—		—		3	0	16	0
Ponte Preta	2013	Série A	15	0	—		—		9 (Note: Appearance(s) in Copa Sudamericana)	1	—		24	1
Ponte Preta	2014	Série B	24	0	11	0	2	0	—		—		37	0
Ponte Preta	2015	Série A	34	3	13	0	2	1	—		—		49	4
Ponte Preta	Subtotal		73	3	24	0	4	1	9	1	—		110	5
Internacional	2016	Série A	18	1	13	0	2	0	—		2 (Note: Appearance(s) in Primeira Liga)	0	35	1
Internacional	2017	Série B	0	0	2	0	—		—		—		2	0
Internacional	Subtotal		18	1	15	0	2	0	—		2	0	37	1
Ponte Preta (loan)	2017	Série A	19	0	12	0	1	0	—		—		32	0
Career total			170	4	84	1	11	1	11	1	5	0	281	7

== Honours ==
=== Club ===
Fluminense

- Campeonato Brasileiro Série A: 2010

Vitória

- Campeonato Baiano: 2013

Internacional

- Campeonato Gaúcho: 2016

=== Individual ===
- Campeonato Paulista Team of the year: 2017
