= Alexi Gómez =

Peruvian footballer (born 1993)

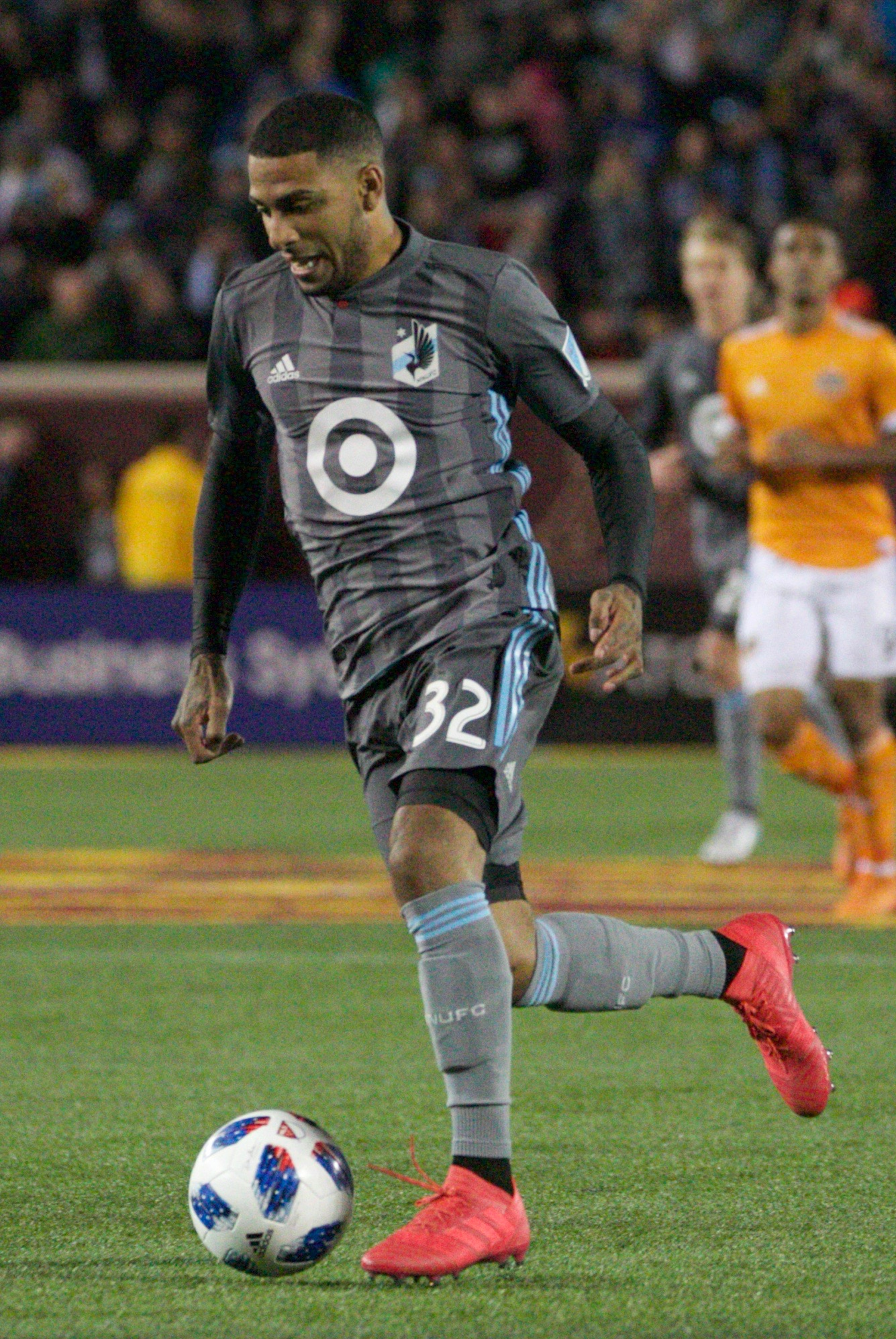
- Gómez with Minnesota United in 2018

Personal information
- Full name: Edwin Alexi Gómez Gutiérrez
- Date of birth: 4 March 1993 (age 33)
- Place of birth: Callao, Peru
- Height: 1.74 m (5 ft 9 in)
- Position: Left winger

Team information
- Current team: Centro Social Pariacoto

Senior career*
Years	Team	Apps	(Gls)
2011	Acosvinchos	15	(2)
2012	León de Huánuco	22	(1)
2013–2019	Universitario	106	(20)
2015	→ IF Brommapojkarna (loan)	8	(0)
2015–2016	→ San Luis (loan)	21	(2)
2018	→ Atlas (loan)	7	(0)
2018	→ Minnesota United (loan)	18	(0)
2019	→ Gimnasia LP (loan)	3	(1)
2019	→ Melgar (loan)	18	(0)
2020–2022	Melgar	0	(0)
2020	→ Alianza Lima (loan)	19	(2)
2021	→ UTC (loan)	23	(2)
2022	Deportivo Llacuabamba	9	(3)
2023–2024	Deportivo Garcilaso	43	(4)
2024	Sport Huancayo	9	(0)
2025	Cienciano	10	(0)
2025–2026	Alianza Universidad	11	(0)
2026–	Centro Social Pariacoto	0	(0)

International career
2013	Peru U20	8	(1)
2013–2017	Peru	5	(0)
- * Club domestic league appearances and goals as of 9 March 2026

Edwin Alexi Gómez Gutiérrez (born 4 March 1993) is a Peruvian professional footballer who plays as a left winger for Peruvian Tercera División club Centro Social Pariacoto. He made five appearances for the Peru national team between 2013 and 2017.

== Club career ==
Gómez started his youth career in Escuela de La Policía. He then went to Sporting Cristal, Esther Grande de Bentín and in 2008 and 2009 played for Club Andrés Campeón – ADC. In 2010, he went for trials to Platense, Tigre, River Plate and Velez Sarsfield where he stayed six months in Velez Sarsfield and was going to make his Reserve debut for the Argentinian Club, but got injured with a broken bone in his foot and had to go through surgery. He returned to Peru and continued his senior career playing for Hijos de Acosvinchos in the Segunda División in 2011. Then he had his first chance in the top-flight by joining León de Huánuco in January 2012. He made his Torneo Descentralizado debut on matchday one in 2–2 draw away to Alianza Lima. He finished his debut season in the Descentralizado with 21 league appearances and 1 goal.

In 2013, he became Peruvian National League Champion scoring in the penalty shootouts in Huancayo against Real Garcilaso del Cusco with Universitario de Deportes achieving the club's 26th National Title.

He also scored in Copa Libertadores 2014 against The Strongest from La Paz, Bolivia. He scored a penalty.

He was the best left winger in U20 South American Championship in 2013 scoring against Uruguay in the first match.

In the Peruvian Top Team he was in the Starting XI in the match Argentina 3–1 Perú in Buenos Aires in World Cup 2014 Qualifiers. He assisted Claudio Pizarro in the first goal.

In August 2015, Gómez moved to Chilean club San Luis de Quillota on a one-year loan from Universitario.

Still a player of Universitario, Gómez joined FBC Melgar in 2019.

In the second half of 2024, Gómez joined Sport Huancayo.

== Style of Play ==
Gomez is left footed. Mainly a left-back, he can also operate as an offensive left winger, defensive and offensive central midfielder, right inverse winger or even striker #11.

== Honours ==
Universitario de Deportes

- Torneo Descentralizado: 2013
