= Bertrand Owundi =

Cameroonian professional footballer (born 1993)

Personal information
- Full name: Bertrand Owundi Eko'o
- Date of birth: 15 October 1993 (age 33)
- Place of birth: Ekono, Cameroon
- Height: 1.88 m (6 ft 2 in)
- Position: Centre-back

Senior career*
Years	Team	Apps	(Gls)
–2012	Unisport Haut–Nkam		
2013	Coton Sport		
2014	Amal Arbaâ		
2014–2017	Astres		
2018	Rainbow Bamenda		
2018	Minnesota United	0	(0)
2018	→ Charlotte Independence (loan)	5	(0)
2019	Forge FC	22	(0)

International career^{‡}
2017–	Cameroon	3	(0)
- * Club domestic league appearances and goals as of 8 January 2020 ‡ National team caps and goals as of 17 January 2019

Bertrand Owundi Eko'o (born 15 October 1993) is a Cameroonian professional footballer who plays as a centre-back.

== Club career ==
=== Early career ===
In 2012, Owundi played for Unisport du Haut–Nkam in Cameroon's Elite One, winning the Cameroon Cup after finishing runner-up the previous year. In 2013, he signed with Coton Sport and won a league title that season. The following year, he made his first move abroad, joining Algerian Ligue Professionelle 1 side Amal Arbaâ.

=== Minnesota United ===
In February 2018 it was announced that Owundi had joined fellow Cameroonian Frantz Pangop at Major League Soccer club Minnesota United FC on a transfer from Rainbow FC. Owundi was released by Minnesota at the end of their 2018 season.

=== Forge FC ===
On 17 January 2019, Owundi signed with Canadian Premier League side Forge FC. That season, he made 22 league appearances, two Canadian Championship appearances and two appearances in CONCACAF League on route to a CPL Championship win for Forge. On 8 January 2020, the club announced that Owundi would not be returning for the 2020 season.

== International career ==
Owundi made his senior international debut on 12 August 2017 in a 2018 African Nations Championship qualification match against São Tomé and Príncipe.

== Honours ==
Unisport Haut–Nkam

- Cameroonian Cup: 2012

Coton Sport

- Elite One: 2013

Forge FC

- Canadian Premier League: 2019
