= Carter Manley =

American soccer player

Personal information
- Full name: Carter Benjamin White Manley
- Date of birth: April 29, 1996 (age 30)
- Place of birth: Elkridge, Maryland, United States
- Height: 1.80 m (5 ft 11 in)
- Position: Full back

Youth career
- Bethesda Soccer Club
- Olney Rangers

College career
Years	Team	Apps	(Gls)
2014–2017	Duke Blue Devils	58	(1)

Senior career*
Years	Team	Apps	(Gls)
2015	D.C. United U-23	13	(0)
2018–2019	Minnesota United	9	(0)
2018	→ Las Vegas Lights (loan)	8	(0)
2019	→ Forward Madison (loan)	19	(1)
2020–2021	Rio Grande Valley FC	44	(2)
2022–2024	San Antonio FC	58	(5)
- * Club domestic league appearances and goals as of October 31, 2024

Carter Benjamin White Manley (born April 29, 1996) is an American soccer player who previously played as a defender.

== Career ==
=== Youth and college ===
Before college, Manley featured for two seasons at Mount Saint Joseph High School in Baltimore, Maryland. He also played club soccer for Bethesda Soccer Club and Olney Rangers.

Manley attended Duke University, where he played college soccer for four years between 2014 and 2017, making 58 appearances, scoring 1 goal and tallying 12 assists.

While in college, he played in the PDL with D.C. United U-23.

== Professional career ==
On January 19, 2018, Manley was drafted in the first round (23rd overall) of the 2018 MLS SuperDraft, by Minnesota United FC. He signed with the club on February 20, 2018.

Manley made his professional debut on March 24, 2018, starting in a 3–0 loss to the New York Red Bulls.

In July 2018, Manley was loaned out to Las Vegas Lights in the USL. He made his league debut for the club on August 15, 2018, coming on as a 79th-minute substitute for Matt Thomas in a 3–1 away defeat to Orange County SC.

In April 2019, Manley was loaned out once again, this time to Minnesota's USL affiliate club Forward Madison FC. he made his league debut for the club on April 6, 2019, playing all ninety minutes in a 1–0 away defeat to Chattanooga Red Wolves.

Manley was released by Minnesota at the end of their 2019 season.

On July 9, 2020, Manley signed for USL Championship side Rio Grande Valley FC.

On January 5, 2022, Manley moved again to a new USL Championship, signing with San Antonio FC.
