= Luiz Fernando (footballer, born 1995) =

Brazilian footballer

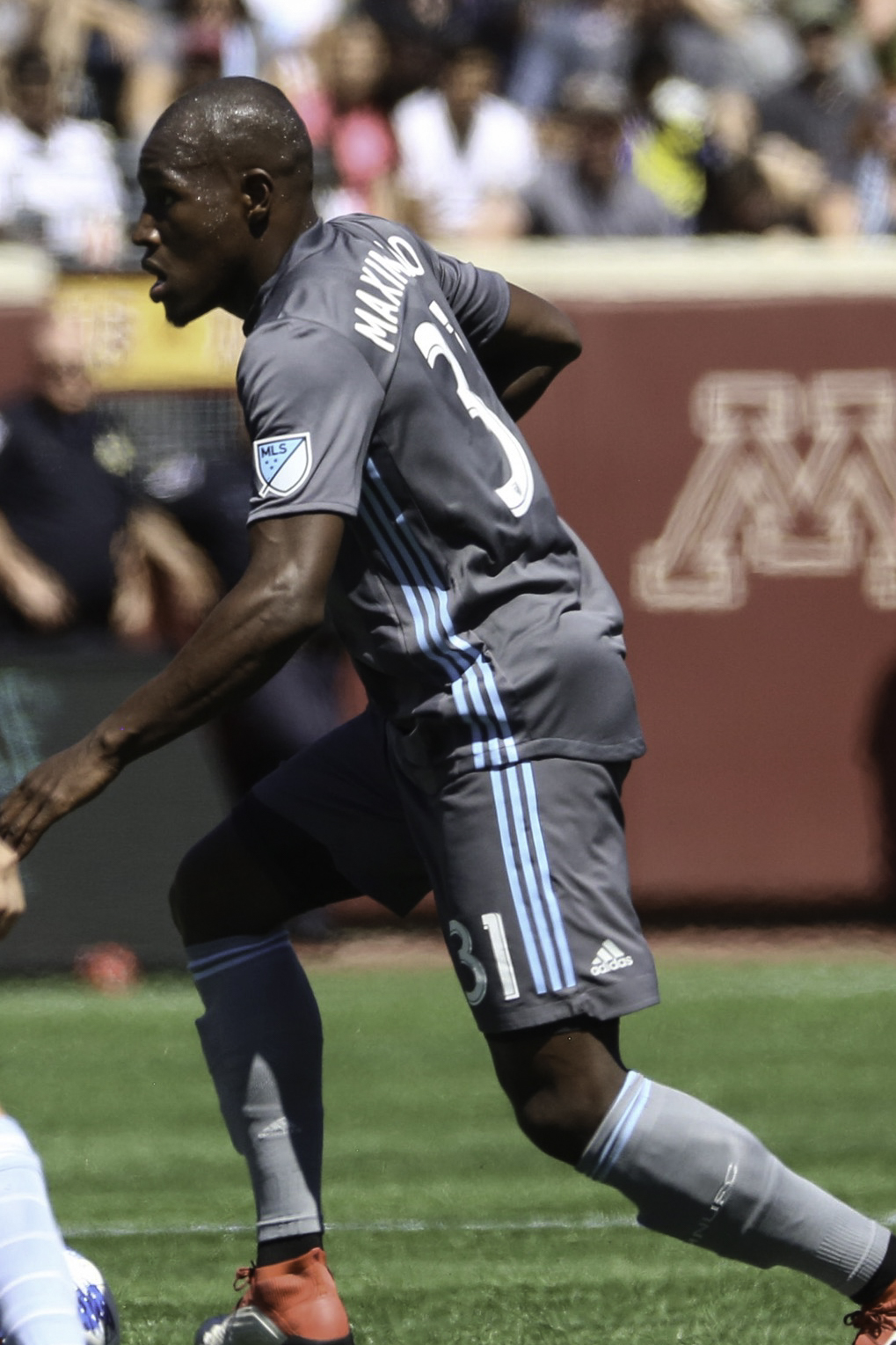
- With Minnesota United in 2018

Personal information
- Full name: Luiz Fernando Ferreira Maximiano
- Date of birth: 8 May 1995 (age 31)
- Place of birth: Rio de Janeiro, Brazil
- Height: 1.78 m (5 ft 10 in)
- Position: Defensive midfielder

Team information
- Current team: Khaitan SC
- Number: 6

Youth career
- Fluminense

Senior career*
Years	Team	Apps	(Gls)
2015–2019	Fluminense	15	(0)
2016	→ Vila Nova (loan)	10	(0)
2016	→ ŠTK Šamorín (loan)	16	(3)
2018	→ Minnesota United (loan)	11	(0)
2019	→ América (loan)	5	(0)
2019–2021	Desportivo Aves	10	(0)
2020–2024	Al-Fahaheel		
2024	Al-Tadamon		
2024–	Khaitan SC		
- * Club domestic league appearances and goals as of 13:10, 27 January 2020 (UTC)

Luiz Fernando Ferreira Maximiano (born 8 May 1995), simply known as Luiz Fernando, is a Brazilian footballer, who plays as a defensive midfielder for Khaitan SC.

== Career ==
Luiz Fernando began his career with Fluminense, spending time on loan with Vila Nova in Brazil, ŠTK Šamorín in Slovakia and Minnesota United in the United States.

In May 2019, he joined América Mineiro on loan.
