= Frantz Pangop =

Cameroonian footballer

Personal information
- Full name: Frantz Pangop T'chidjui
- Date of birth: 18 May 1993 (age 33)
- Place of birth: Douala, Cameroon
- Height: 5 ft 10 in (1.78 m)
- Position: Attacking midfielder

Senior career*
Years	Team	Apps	(Gls)
2012	Sable FC		
2013	Coton Sport		
2014	Örgryte	18	(6)
2015–2017	Union Douala		
2018	Minnesota United	9	(0)
2019–2020	SC Rheindorf Altach	7	(1)
2023–2024	Darby FC	9	(0)

International career^{‡}
2016–2017	Cameroon U23	5	(2)
2017–2018	Cameroon	6	(2)
- * Club domestic league appearances and goals as of 1 June 2024 ‡ National team caps and goals as of 20 January 2018

Frantz Pangop T'chidjui (born 18 May 1993) is a Cameroonian professional footballer.

== Club career ==
He began his senior career in his native Cameroon with Sable and Coton Sport.

In March 2014, he joined Swedish club Örgryte in the third tier Division 1 Södra.

He then returned to Cameroon with Union Douala.

In January 2018, Pangop signed a one-year contract with Minnesota United FC in Major League Soccer. He joined on a transfer fee of $65,000. He made his debut on 24 March against the New York Red Bulls. He scored his first goal for the club in a mid-season exhibition match against Costa Rican club Deportivo Saprissa on 11 July. At the end of the season, Minnesota declined his contract option for the following season.

In June 2019, Pangop signed with SC Rheindorf Altach of the Austrian Bundesliga. He joined on a two-year contract, with a club option for an additional season. He departed the club in December 2020 by mutual consent, subsequently dealing with an injury that kept him out of football activities.

In 2023, he played with Canadian club Darby in League1 Ontario.

== International career ==
In 2012, he was called up to the Cameroon U20.

He debuted for the Cameroon senior team at the 2018 African Nations Championship qualification tournament (with a B squad selection). He was then subsequently called up for 2018 FIFA World Cup qualification matches the following month, with a full A squad contingent. He subsequently scored in his first game with the full A team on 7 October 2017 against Algeria, two minutes after entering the match as a late-game substitute.

=== International goals ===
Scores and results list Cameroon's goal tally first.

No	Date	Venue	Opponent	Score	Result	Competition
1.	12 August 2017	Estádio Nacional 12 de Julho, São Tomé, São Tomé and Príncipe	São Tomé and Príncipe	1–0	2–0	2018 African Nations Championship qualification
2.	7 October 2017	Stade Ahmadou Ahidjo, Yaoundé, Cameroon	Algeria	2–0	2–0	2018 FIFA World Cup qualification
