= 2022 Minnesota United FC season =

Minnesota United FC
2022 season
- Owner: Bill McGuire
- Head coach: Adrian Heath
- Stadium: Allianz Field
- Major League Soccer: Conference: 6th Overall: 11th
- MLS Cup Playoffs: 1st Round
- U.S. Open Cup: Round of 16
- Top goalscorer: League: Emanuel Reynoso (10); All: Emanuel Reynoso (12)
- Highest home attendance: 19,941
- Lowest home attendance: 18,107
- Average home league attendance: 19,560
- Biggest win: MIN 3-0 Chi (4/23)
- Biggest defeat: MIN 1-4 SKC (9/17)
Home colors	Away colors

The 2022 Minnesota United FC season was the club's thirteenth season of existence, and sixth in Major League Soccer. Their season began on February 26, 2022, where they drew with the Philadelphia Union 1–1 in Philadelphia. The club will play its home matches at Allianz Field in Saint Paul, Minnesota. The club reached the MLS Cup Playoffs for a fourth consecutive year.

== Technical Staff ==
As of April 16, 2022

Position	Name
Sporting Director	(United States) Manny Lagos
Technical Director	(Canada) Mark Watson
Director of Player Personnel	(United States) Amos Magee
Manager	(England) Adrian Heath
Assistant coaches	(United States) Ian Fuller
Assistant coaches	(England) Sean McAuley
Goalkeeper coach	(Scotland) Stewart Kerr

On June 23, the club announced that Head Coach Adrian Heath had signed a contract extension through the 2024 season. In addition, the club also announced that Assistant Coaches Ian Fuller and Sean McAuley and Goalkeeper Coach Stewart Kerr also signed contract extensions.

== Roster ==
As of August 20th, 2022

No.	Name	Nationality	Position	Date of birth (age)	Signed from
Goalkeepers
1	Tyler Miller	(United States)	GK	12 March 1993 (age 33)	(United States) Los Angeles FC
13	Eric Dick	(United States)	GK	3 October 1994 (age 32)	2021 MLS Re-Entry Draft
97	Dayne St. Clair	(Canada)	GK	9 May 1997 (age 29)	(United States) Maryland Terrapins
99	Fred Emmings (HGP)	(United States)	GK	8 February 2004 (age 22)	(United States) MNUFC Academy
Defenders
2	Alan Benítez	(Paraguay)	DF	25 January 1994 (age 32)	(Paraguay) Cerro Porteño
4	Callum Montgomery	(Canada)	DF	14 May 1997 (age 29)	(United States) FC Dallas
12	Bakaye Dibassy	(Mali)	DF	11 August 1989 (age 37)	(France) Amiens SC
14	Brent Kallman	(United States)	DF	4 October 1990 (age 36)	(United States) Minnesota United FC (NASL)
15	Michael Boxall	(New Zealand)	DF	18 August 1988 (age 38)	(South Africa) SuperSport United
19	Romain Métanire	(Madagascar)	DF	28 March 1990 (age 36)	(France) Stade Reims
22	Devin Padelford (HGP)	(United States)	DF	3 January 2003 (age 23)	(United States) MNUFC Academy
27	DJ Taylor	(United States)	DF	26 August 1997 (age 29)	(United States) North Carolina FC
36	Nabilai Kibunguchy	(United States)	DF	5 January 1998 (age 28)	(United States) UC Davis Aggies
91	Oniel Fisher	(Jamaica)	DF	22 November 1991 (age 34)	(United States) LA Galaxy
92	Kemar Lawrence	(Jamaica)	DF	17 September 1992 (age 34)	(Canada) Toronto FC
Midfielders
5	Jacori Hayes	(United States)	MF	29 June 1995 (age 31)	(United States) FC Dallas
6	Jonathan González (on loan from C.F. Monterrey)	(Mexico)	MF	13 April 1999 (age 27)	(Mexico) C.F. Monterrey
8	Joseph Rosales (on loan from CA Independiente)	(Honduras)	MF	6 November 2000 (age 26)	(Argentina) CA Independiente
10	Emanuel Reynoso (DP)	(Argentina)	MF	16 November 1995 (age 30)	(Argentina) Boca Juniors
11	Niko Hansen	(Denmark)	MF	14 September 1994 (age 32)	(United States) Houston Dynamo FC
17	Robin Lod	(Finland)	MF	17 April 1993 (age 33)	(Spain) Sporting Gijón
20	Wil Trapp	(United States)	MF	15 January 1993 (age 33)	(United States) Inter Miami CF
25	Aziel Jackson (HGP)	(United States)	MF	25 October 2001 (age 25)	(United States) New York Red Bulls
31	Hassani Dotson	(United States)	MF	6 August 1997 (age 29)	(United States) Lane United FC
33	Kervin Arriaga	(Honduras)	MF	5 January 1998 (age 28)	(Honduras) C.D. Marathon
Forwards
7	Franco Fragapane	(Argentina)	FW	6 February 1993 (age 33)	(Argentina) Talleres
9	Luis Amarilla (DP)	(Paraguay)	FW	25 August 1995 (age 31)	(Argentina) CA Vélez Sarsfield
16	Tani Oluwaseyi	(Canada)	FW	15 May 2000 (age 26)	(United States) St John's Red Storm
18	Abu Danladi	(Ghana)	FW	18 October 1995 (age 31)	(United States) Nashville SC
21	Bongokuhle Hlongwane	(South Africa)	FW	20 June 2000 (age 26)	(South Africa) Maritzburg United
24	Justin McMaster	(Jamaica)	FW	30 June 1999 (age 27)	(United States) Wake Forest Demon Deacons
28	Ménder García (DP)	(Colombia)	FW	28 October 1998 (age 28)	(Colombia) Once Caldas
29	Patrick Weah (HGP)	(Liberia)	FW	5 December 2003 (age 22)	(United States) Saint Louis Billikens
Player(s) transferred out during this season
23	Adrien Hunou	(France)	MF	19 January 1994 (age 32)	(France) Rennes
77	Chase Gasper	(United States)	DF	25 January 1996 (age 30)	(United States) Maryland Terrapins

== Transfers ==
=== Transfers in ===
Date	Position	No.	Player	From club	Notes	Ref.
December 23, 2021	GK	13	(United States) Eric Dick	(United States) Columbus Crew	2021 MLS Re-Entry Draft	
January 5, 2022	FW	21	(South Africa) Bongokuhle Hlongwane	(South Africa) Maritzburg United	Transfer	
February 2, 2022	DF	91	(Jamaica) Oniel Fisher	(United States) LA Galaxy	Signed	
February 16, 2022	MF	33	(Honduras) Kervin Arriaga	(Honduras) C.D. Marathón	Transfer	
February 19, 2022	FW	9	(Paraguay) Luis Amarilla	(Argentina) CA Vélez Sarsfield	Transfer	
March 10, 2022	DF	22	(United States) Devin Padelford	(United States) MNUFC Academy	Signed as a Homegrown Player (HGP)	
March 17, 2022	DF	92	(Jamaica) Kemar Lawrence	(Canada) Toronto FC	Trade	
July 12, 2022	DF	2	(Paraguay) Alan Benítez	(Paraguay) Cerro Porteño	Transfer	
August 5, 2022	FW	28	(Colombia) Ménder García	(Colombia) Once Caldas	Transfer	

=== MLS SuperDraft ===
Round	Pick	Player	Position	Previous club	Status	Ref
1	17	(Canada) Tani Oluwaseyi	Forward	St. John's	Signed	

=== Transfers out ===
Date	Position	No.	Player	To club	Notes	Ref.
December 1, 2021	FW	9	(Nigeria) Fanendo Adi	Free Agent	Option declined	
December 1, 2021	FW	21	(United States) Juan Agudelo	(United States) Birmingham Legion	Option declined	
December 1, 2021	DF	2	(New Zealand) Noah Billingsley	Free Agent	Option declined	
December 1, 2021	MF	8	(Slovakia) Ján Greguš	(United States) San Jose Earthquakes	Option declined	
December 1, 2021	DF	22	(Finland) Jukka Raitala	(Finland) HJK	Option declined	
December 1, 2021	GK	30	(United States) Adrian Zendejas	(United States) Charlotte FC	Option declined	
December 1, 2021	MF	6	(Cuba) Osvaldo Alonso	(United States) Atlanta United FC	Contract Expired	
December 1, 2021	MF	13	(United States) Ethan Finlay	(United States) Austin FC	Contract Expired	
January 26, 2022	MF	11	(Uruguay) Thomás Chacón	Free Agent	Contract Bought Out	
May 4, 2022	DF	77	(United States) Chase Gasper	(United States) LA Galaxy	Traded	
June 29, 2022	MF	23	(France) Adrien Hunou	(France) Angers SCO	Transfer	

=== Loans in ===
Start date	End date	Position	No.	Player	From club	Ref.
August 7	End of 2022 Season	MF	6	Jonathan González	(Mexico) C.F. Monterrey	

=== Loans out ===
Start date	End date	Position	No.	Player	To club	Ref.

== Friendlies ==
Win Draw Loss

January 29 Friendly	Minnesota United FC	0–0	Chicago Fire FC	Orlando, Florida
12:00 PM CT		Report		Attendance: 0
Note: Played behind closed doors

February 3 Friendly	Minnesota United FC	5–4	Orlando City SC	Orlando, Florida
11:00 AM CT	Danladi; Reynoso; Hayes; Trapp; Trialist	Report	Michel; Freeman; Akindele; Lynn	Stadium: Exploria Stadium; Attendance: 0
Note: Played behind closed doors

February 13 Friendly	Portland Timbers	1–0	Minnesota United FC	Portland, Oregon
2:00 PM CT	Moreno 5'	Report	Tuiloma (red card) 76'	Stadium: Providence Park; Attendance: 7,438

February 16 Friendly	Real Salt Lake	0–0	Minnesota United FC	Portland, Oregon
7:00 PM CT		Report		Stadium: Providence Park

February 19 Friendly	Minnesota United FC	2–2	(Norway) Viking FK	Portland, Oregon
4:30 PM CT	Amarilla; Lod	Report		Stadium: Providence Park

June 11 Friendly	Minnesota United FC	4–3	(Germany) SC Paderborn 07	St. Paul, Minnesota
7:00 PM CT	Dibassy 6'; Hayes 45+2'; Amarilla 61'; Jackson 76'	Report	Conteh 21'; Schuster 54'; Carls 80'	Stadium: Allianz Field

July 20 Friendly	Minnesota United FC	4–0	(England) Everton	St. Paul, Minnesota
7:00 PM CT	Reynoso 18' (pen.); Keane 32' (o.g.); Amarilla 36'; Danladi 78'			Stadium: Allianz Field

== Competitions ==
=== MLS Regular Season ===
==== Standings ====
===== Overall =====
Pos	Team	Pld	W	L	T	GF	GA	GD	Pts	
9	Nashville SC	34	13	10	11	52	41	+11	50	
10	FC Cincinnati	34	12	9	13	64	56	+8	49	
11	Minnesota United FC	34	14	14	6	48	51	−3	48	
12	Inter Miami CF	34	14	14	6	47	56	−9	48	
13	Orlando City SC (U)	34	14	14	6	44	53	−9	48	Qualification for the CONCACAF Champions League (Note: As 2022 U.S. Open Cup champions (USA4))

Source: MLS
Rules for classification: 1) points; 2) total wins; 3) total goal differential; 4) total goals scored; 5) fewer disciplinary points; 6) away goal differential; 7) away goals scored; 8) home goals differential; 9) home goals scored; 10) coin toss (2 clubs tied) or drawing of lots (≥3 clubs tied)
(U) U.S. Open Cup winners

===== Western Conference =====
Pos	Team	Pld	W	L	T	GF	GA	GD	Pts	Qualification
1	Los Angeles FC	34	21	9	4	66	38	+28	67	Qualification for the conference semifinals and the CONCACAF Champions League
2	Austin FC	34	16	10	8	65	49	+16	56	Qualification for the first round and the CONCACAF Champions League
3	FC Dallas	34	14	9	11	48	37	+11	53	Qualification for the first round
4	LA Galaxy	34	14	12	8	58	51	+7	50	Qualification for the first round
5	Nashville SC	34	13	10	11	52	41	+11	50	Qualification for the first round
6	Minnesota United FC	34	14	14	6	48	51	−3	48	Qualification for the first round
7	Real Salt Lake	34	12	11	11	43	45	−2	47	Qualification for the first round
8	Portland Timbers	34	11	10	13	53	53	0	46	
9	Vancouver Whitecaps FC (Note: Canadian clubs could not qualify for the 2023 CONCACAF Champions League through the MLS regular season or playoffs.)	34	12	15	7	40	57	−17	43	Qualification for the CONCACAF Champions League (Note: as 2022 Canadian Championship winners.)
10	Colorado Rapids	34	11	13	10	46	57	−11	43	
11	Seattle Sounders FC	34	12	17	5	47	46	+1	41	
12	Sporting Kansas City	34	11	16	7	42	54	−12	40	
13	Houston Dynamo FC	34	10	18	6	43	56	−13	36	

Source: MLS
Rules for classification: 1) points; 2) total wins; 3) total goal differential; 4) total goals scored; 5) fewer disciplinary points; 6) away goal differential; 7) away goals scored; 8) home goals differential; 9) home goals scored; 10) coin toss (2 clubs tied) or drawing of lots (≥3 clubs tied)

==== Results summary ====
Overall								Home						Away					
Pld	Pts	W	L	T	GF	GA	GD	W	L	T	GF	GA	GD	W	L	T	GF	GA	GD
34	48	14	14	6	48	51	−3	8	4	5	27	20	+7	6	10	1	21	31	−10

Last updated: October 9th, 2022
Source: MLS Results
Pld = Matches played; Pts = Points; W = Matches won; T = Matches tied; L = Matches lost; GF = Goals for; GA = Goals against; GD = Goal difference

==== Regular season ====
February 26 1	Philadelphia Union	1–1	Minnesota United FC	Chester, Pennsylvania
12:00 PM CT	Burke 35'; Glesnes (yellow card) 41'; Martinez (yellow card) 51'	Report	Lod 23' (yellow card) 79'; Boxall (yellow card) 74'; Reynoso (yellow card) 85'	Stadium: Subaru Park; Attendance: 17,487; Referee: Rubiel Vazquez

March 5 2	Minnesota United FC	1–1	Nashville SC	St. Paul, Minnesota
5:00 PM CT	Dotson (yellow card) 20' (goal) 71'; Dibassy (yellow card) 31'	Report	Sapong 5'; Davis (yellow card) 26'; Godoy (yellow card) 58'	Stadium: Allianz Field; Attendance: 18,107; Referee: Armando Villarreal

March 13 3	New York Red Bulls	0–1	Minnesota United FC	Harrison, New Jersey
2:00 PM CT	Nealis (yellow card) 49'; Yearwood (yellow card) 56'	Report	Wil Trapp (yellow card) 39'; Reynoso (yellow card) 45+3'; Amarilla 51'	Stadium: Red Bull Arena; Attendance: 14,848; Referee: Lukasz Szpala
Note: Kickoff was originally scheduled at 3:00 p.m. CT before moving to 6:00 p.m. CT

March 19 4	Minnesota United FC	1–0	San Jose Earthquakes	St. Paul, Minnesota
7:00 PM CT	Trapp (yellow card) 39'; Amarilla 32' (yellow card) 70'	Report	Lopez (yellow card) 10'; Calvo (yellow card) 43'; Cowell (yellow card) 83'	Stadium: Allianz Field; Attendance: 18,685; Referee: Pierre-Luc Lauziere

April 2 5	Minnesota United FC	1–2	Seattle Sounders FC	St. Paul, Minnesota
7:00 PM CT	Trapp (yellow card) 10'; Lod (yellow card) 56'; Boxall (yellow card) 62'; Rosales (yellow card) 74'; Reynoso 82' (pen.) (yellow card) 90+4'	Report	João Paulo 38'; Kallman 49' (o.g.); Ragen (yellow card) 71'; Rowe (yellow card) 90+4'	Stadium: Allianz Field; Attendance: 19,615; Referee: Ismail Elfath

April 10 6	Austin FC	1–0	Minnesota United FC	Austin, Texas
6:30 PM CT	Cascante (yellow card) 53'; Urruti 58'; Gallagher (yellow card) 90+4'	Report	Trapp (yellow card) 10'; Boxall (yellow card) 67'	Stadium: Q2 Stadium; Attendance: 20,738; Referee: Rosendo Mendoza

April 16 7	Minnesota United FC	3–1	Colorado Rapids	St. Paul, Minnesota
7:00 PM CT	Dibassy 42'; Arriaga (yellow card) 56'; Lod (yellow card) 69' (goal) 77'; Danladi 79'	Report	Esteves (yellow card) 27'; Rubio (yellow card) 30' (goal) 45'; Yarbrough (yellow card) 32'; Price (yellow card) 36'	Stadium: Allianz Field; Attendance: 19,629; Referee: Chris Penso

April 23 8	Minnesota United FC	3–0	Chicago Fire FC	St. Paul, Minnesota
4:00 PM CT	Trapp (yellow card) 36'; Reynoso 72'; Arriaga 84'; Lod 88'	Report	M. Navarro (yellow card) 35'; Giménez (yellow card) 41'; F. Navarro (yellow card) 52' (yellow-red card) 77'	Stadium: Allianz Field; Attendance: 19,658; Referee: Silviu Petrescu

May 1 9	Los Angeles FC	2–0	Minnesota United FC	Los Angeles, California
9:00 PM CT	Hollingshead 82'; Cifuentes 90'	Report	Dibassy (yellow card) 69'; Arriaga (yellow card) 85'	Stadium: Banc of California Stadium; Attendance: 22,010; Referee: Allen Chapman

May 7 10	Minnesota United FC	0–1	FC Cincinnati	St. Paul, Minnesota
7:00 PM CT		Report	Powell (yellow card) 69'; Cameron (yellow card) 73'; Nwobodo (yellow card) 87'; Vazquez 90+3'	Stadium: Allianz Field; Attendance: 19,662; Referee: Marcos de Oliveira

May 15 11	Seattle Sounders FC	3–1	Minnesota United FC	Seattle, Washington
3:00 PM CT	Vargas (yellow card) 10'; Arreaga (yellow card) 42'; Ruidíaz 50' (pen.); Roldan 74'; Yeimar (yellow card) 90+2'; Lodeiro 90+4'	Report	Lod 34'; Trapp (yellow card) 49'; Fisher (yellow card) 52'; Arriaga (yellow card) 55'; Reynoso (yellow card) 68'	Stadium: Lumen Field; Attendance: 32,613; Referee: Joseph Dickerson

May 18 12	Minnesota United FC	1–1	LA Galaxy	St. Paul, Minnesota
7:00 PM CT	Boxall (yellow card) 35'; Arriaga (yellow card) 41'; Lod 87'	Report	Raveloson (yellow card) 2'; Kljestan 83' (pen.)	Stadium: Allianz Field; Attendance: 19,645; Referee: Jair Marrufo

May 22 13	FC Dallas	1–2	Minnesota United FC	Frisco, Texas
6:00 PM CT	Twumasi (yellow card) 40'; Arriola 59'	Report	Lod 20'; Boxall (yellow card) 31'; Arriaga (yellow card) 33'; Fragapane (yellow card) 33'; Taylor 55'; Reynoso (yellow card) 78'; St. Clair (yellow card) 90+6'	Stadium: Toyota Stadium; Attendance: 15,280; Referee: Lukasz Szpala

May 28 14	Minnesota United FC	0–1	New York City FC	St. Paul, Minnesota
7:00 PM CT	Dibassy (yellow card) 31'; Trapp (yellow card) 36'; Taylor (yellow card) 39'; Rosales (yellow card) 44'	Report	Callens 29'; Andrade (yellow card) 82'	Stadium: Allianz Field; Attendance: 19,695; Referee: Michael Radchuk

June 19 15	New England Revolution	2–1	Minnesota United FC	Foxborough, Massachusetts
4:00 PM CT	McNamara (yellow card) 13'; Farrell (yellow card) 36'; Borrero 53'; Bou 69'	Report	Reynoso 37' (pen.); Trapp (yellow card) 58'; Lod (yellow card) 68'; Dibassy (yellow card) 80'; Amarilla (yellow card) 80'; Lawrence (yellow card) 83'; Hunou (yellow card) 86'	Stadium: Gillette Stadium; Attendance: 21,289; Referee: Ismir Pekmic
Note: Kickoff was originally scheduled at 7:00 p.m. CT before moving to 4:00 p.m. CT

June 25 16	Inter Miami CF	2–1	Minnesota United FC	Ft. Lauderdale, Florida
7:00 PM CT	Yedlin (yellow card) 16'; Lowe (yellow card) 46'; Gregore (yellow card) 66'; Vassilev 87', 90'	Report	Taylor (yellow card) 6'; Fragapane (yellow card) 43'; Amarilla 65'; Hayes (yellow card) 71'; Kallman (yellow card) 90+4'	Stadium: DRV PNK Stadium; Attendance: 12,147; Referee: Victor Rivas

June 29 17	LA Galaxy	2–3	Minnesota United FC	Carson, California
9:30 PM CT	Cabral (red card) 25'; Delgado 60' (pen.); Williams (yellow card) 70'; Joveljić 90+3'; Costa (red card) 90+5'	Report	Reynoso 9', 43'; Boxall (yellow card) 20'; Fragapane 36' (yellow card) 41'; Trapp (yellow card) 85'; Rosales (yellow card) 90+4' (yellow-red card) 90+5'	Stadium: Dignity Health Sports Park; Attendance: 18,337; Referee: Ted Unkel

July 3 18	Minnesota United FC	3–2	Real Salt Lake	St. Paul, Minnesota
7:00 PM CT	Reynoso 9', 45+3'; Boxall (yellow card) 15'; Amarilla 61'	Report	Ruiz (yellow card) 33'; Herrera (yellow card) 37'; Savarino 71'; Julio 76'	Stadium: Allianz Field; Attendance: 19,647; Referee: Ramy Touchan

July 8 19	Vancouver Whitecaps FC	1–3	Minnesota United FC	Vancouver, British Columbia
9:30 PM CT	Cavallini 66'	Report	Lod (yellow card) 24'; Lawrence 71'; Amarilla 84'; Fragapane 88'	Stadium: BC Place; Attendance: 14,201; Referee: Alex Chilowicz

July 13 20	Minnesota United FC	1–1	Sporting Kansas City	St. Paul, Minnesota
7:00 PM CT	Trapp (yellow card) 16'; Pulskamp 43' (o.g.); Taylor (yellow card) 53'; Reynoso (yellow card) 76'	Report	Fontàs (yellow card) 47'; Russell 63'	Stadium: Allianz Field; Attendance: 19,657; Referee: Guido Gonzales Jr.

July 16 21	Minnesota United FC	2–0	D.C. United	St. Paul, Minnesota
7:00 PM	Reynoso 13', 50'	Report	Guediri (yellow card) 80'	Stadium: Allianz Field; Attendance: 19,718; Referee: Jair Marrufo

July 23 22	Houston Dynamo	1–2	Minnesota United FC	Houston, Texas
7:30 PM CT	Lundqvist (yellow card) 8'; Dorsey (yellow card) 59'; Picault 85'	Report	Fragapane 45+2'; Hlongwane 72'	Stadium: PNC Stadium; Attendance: 15,223; Referee: Nima Saghafi

July 30 23	Minnesota United FC	4–4	Portland Timbers	St. Paul, Minnesota
2:00 PM CT	Fragapane 9'; Hlongwane 21'; Amarilla 41', 69'; Boxall (yellow card) 53'; Arriaga (yellow card) 72'; Benítez (yellow card) 75'; Reynoso (yellow card) 90'; Lod (yellow card) 90+3'	Report	Blanco 1', 50'; D. Chará (yellow card) 18'; Niezgoda 53'; Y. Chara (yellow card) 62'; Lawrence 65' (o.g.); Ayala (yellow card) 73'; Asprilla (yellow card) 83'	Stadium: Allianz Field; Attendance: 19,792; Referee: Victor Rivas

August 6 24	Colorado Rapids	4–3	Minnesota United FC	Commerce City, Colorado
8:00 PM CT	Zardes 7', 15', 61'; Rubio 11'; Acosta (yellow card) 82'; Max (yellow card) 83'	Report	Danladi 4'; Amarilla 43'; Rosales (yellow card) 67'; Kallman 81'; Lawrence (yellow card) 87'; Fragapane (yellow card) 90+1'	Stadium: Dick's Sporting Goods Park; Attendance: 14,738; Referee: Ismir Pekmic

August 14 25	Nashville SC	1–2	Minnesota United FC	Nashville, Tennessee
8:00 PM CT	Mukhtar 61'; Leal (yellow card) 90+4'	Report	Fragapane 27' (yellow card) 45+1'; Reynoso (yellow card) 31'; Lod (yellow card) 46'; Benítez 75'	Stadium: Geodis Park; Attendance: 25,240; Referee: Alex Chilowicz
Note: Kickoff was originally scheduled at 7:00 p.m. CT before moving to 8:00 p.m. CT.

August 20 26	Minnesota United FC	2–1	Austin FC	St. Paul, Minnesota
7:00 PM CT	Reynoso 25' (pen.); Fragapane 62'	Report	Driussi 45+2' (pen.); Kolmanič (yellow card) 80'	Stadium: Allianz Field; Attendance: 19,829; Referee: Allen Chapman

August 27 27	Minnesota United FC	2–1	Houston Dynamo	St. Paul, Minnesota
2:30 PM CT	Reynoso (yellow card) 43'; Picault 79' (o.g.); Amarilla 84'	Report	Baird 45+1'	Stadium: Allianz Field; Attendance: 19,624; Referee: Rosendo Mendoza

August 31 28	Real Salt Lake	3–0	Minnesota United FC	Sandy, Utah
8:30 PM CT	Córdova 7'; Löffelsend (yellow card) 20'; Savarino 23'; Glad (yellow card) 39'; Julio 79'	Report	Benítez (yellow card) 32'	Stadium: Rio Tinto Stadium; Attendance: 20,358; Referee: Drew Fischer

September 3 29	Minnesota United FC	0–3	FC Dallas	St. Paul, Minnesota
2:30 PM CT	Fragapane (yellow card) 20' (yellow-red card) 69'; Arriaga (yellow card) 80'	Report	Arriola (yellow card) 4'; Farfan (yellow card) 15'; Boxall 55' (o.g.); Velasco 56'; Ferreira 58'	Stadium: Allianz Field; Attendance: 19,761; Referee: Ismail Elfath

September 10 30	Portland Timbers	1–0	Minnesota United FC	Portland, Oregon
9:00 PM CT	Bravo (yellow card) 43'; Asprilla 61'; McGraw (yellow card) 85'	Report	Lawrence (yellow card) 88'	Stadium: Providence Park; Attendance: 25,019; Referee: Guido Gonzales Jr.

September 13 31	Minnesota United FC	1–1	Los Angeles FC	St. Paul, Minnesota
7:00 PM CT	Kallman 45'; Danladi (yellow card) 52'; Reynoso (yellow card) 88'	Report	Arango (yellow card) 37'; Vela 64'	Stadium: Allianz Field; Attendance: 19,861; Referee: Timothy Ford

September 17 32	Sporting Kansas City	4–1	Minnesota United FC	Kansas City, Kansas
7:30 PM CT	Boxall 31' (o.g.); Thommy 41'; Agada 45', 81'; Shelton (yellow card) 86'	Report	García 57'; Rosales (yellow card) 84'	Stadium: Children's Mercy Park; Attendance: 19,680; Referee: Marcos de Oliveira

October 1 33	San Jose Earthquakes	2–0	Minnesota United FC	San Jose, California
9:00 PM CT	Yueill (yellow card) 9'; Salinas 52' (yellow card) 53'; Kikanovic 71' (yellow card) 86'	Report	Arriaga (yellow card) 10'; Amarilla (yellow card) 23'; Boxall (yellow card) 50'	Stadium: PayPal Park; Attendance: 15,709; Referee: Nima Saghafi

October 9 34	Minnesota United FC	2–0	Vancouver Whitecaps FC	St. Paul, Minnesota
4:00 PM CT	Fragapane 17'; Trapp (yellow card) 33'; González 77'	Report	Gauld (yellow card) 90'	Stadium: Allianz Field; Attendance: 19,941; Referee: Allen Chapman

=== MLS Cup Playoffs ===
October 17 First Round	FC Dallas	1–1 (a.e.t.) (5-4 p)	Minnesota United FC	Frisco, Texas
8:30 PM CT	Quignon 64'; Arriola (yellow card) 72'	Report	Reynoso 53'; Fragapane (yellow card) 73'; Taylor (yellow card) 105+1'	Stadium: Toyota Stadium; Attendance: 19,096; Referee: Ted Unkel
	Penalties
	Jara (penalty scored); Lletget (penalty scored); Hedges (penalty scored); Ferreira (penalty scored); Velasco (penalty scored)		Reynoso (penalty scored); Trapp (penalty missed); Arriaga (penalty scored); Benítez (penalty scored); García (penalty scored)

=== U.S. Open Cup ===
April 20 Third Round	Forward Madison FC	0–2	Minnesota United FC	Madison, Wisconsin
6:00 PM CT	Maldonado (yellow card) 22'; Murillo (yellow card) 45+3'; Streng (yellow card) 62'; Osmond (yellow card) 72'; Conner (red card) 84'	Report	Kallman (yellow card) 45+3' (goal) 83'; Hunou 51'; Hayes (yellow card) 53'; Gasper (yellow card) 88'; Fragapane (yellow card) 90+3'	Stadium: Breese Stevens Field; Attendance: 2,663; Referee: Jervis Atagana

May 11 Round of 32	Minnesota United FC	2–1	Colorado Rapids	St. Paul, Minnesota
7:00 PM CT	Danladi 8'; Kallman (yellow card) 55' (yellow-red card) 83'; Reynoso 87'	Report	Mezquida 15'; Max (yellow card) 63'	Stadium: Allianz Field; Referee: Brandon Stevis
Note: Match was originally scheduled for May 11 and was suspended in the 20th minute due to lightning.

May 25 Round of 16	Minnesota United FC	1–2	Union Omaha	St. Paul, Minnesota
7:00 PM CT	Hunou 6'; Hlongwane (yellow card) 55'	Report	Kametani 45+1'; Brito 51'	Stadium: Allianz Field; Referee: Elton García

== Statistics ==
=== Appearances and goals ===
Last updated October 17th 2022.

No.	Pos	Nat	Player	Total		Major League Soccer		U.S. Open Cup		Playoffs	
No.	Pos	Nat	Player	Apps	Goals	Apps	Goals	Apps	Goals	Apps	Goals
Goalkeepers
1	GK	(United States) USA	Tyler Miller	5	0	2+1	0	2	0	0	0
13	GK	(United States) USA	Eric Dick	1	0	0	0	1	0	0	0
97	GK	(Canada) CAN	Dayne St. Clair	33	0	32	0	0	0	1	0
99	GK	(Luxembourg) LUX	Fred Emmings	0	0	0	0	0	0	0	0
Defenders
2	DF	(Paraguay) PAR	Alan Benítez	12	1	6+5	1	0	0	0+1	0
4	DF	(Canada) CAN	Callum Montgomery	0	0	0	0	0	0	0	0
12	DF	(Mali) MLI	Bakaye Dibassy	27	1	26	1	1	0	0	0
14	DF	(United States) USA	Brent Kallman	23	3	15+5	2	2	1	1	0
15	DF	(New Zealand) NZL	Michael Boxall	34	0	31	0	2	0	1	0
19	DF	(Madagascar) MAD	Romain Métanire	1	0	0+1	0	0	0	0	0
22	DF	(United States) USA	Devin Padelford	1	0	0	0	0+1	0	0	0
27	DF	(United States) USA	DJ Taylor	30	1	23+3	1	3	0	1	0
36	DF	(United States) USA	Nabilai Kibunguchy	5	0	2	0	2+1	0	0	0
91	DF	(Jamaica) JAM	Oniel Fisher	15	0	6+5	0	3	0	0+1	0
92	DF	(Jamaica) JAM	Kemar Lawrence	28	1	26+1	1	0	0	1	0
Midfielders
5	MF	(United States) USA	Jacori Hayes	10	0	0+8	0	2	0	0	0
6	MF	(Mexico) MEX	Jonathan González	8	1	1+7	1	0	0	0	0
8	MF	(Honduras) HON	Joseph Rosales	28	0	8+16	0	2+1	0	0+1	0
10	MF	(Argentina) ARG	Emanuel Reynoso	31	12	29	10	0+1	1	1	1
11	MF	(Denmark) DEN	Niko Hansen	7	0	0+5	0	1+1	0	0	0
17	MF	(Finland) FIN	Robin Lod	32	6	29+1	6	0+1	0	1	0
20	MF	(United States) USA	Wil Trapp	29	0	25+2	0	0+1	0	1	0
25	MF	(United States) USA	Aziel Jackson	2	0	0	0	0+2	0	0	0
31	MF	(United States) USA	Hassani Dotson	8	1	7	1	0+1	0	0	0
33	MF	(Honduras) HON	Kervin Arriaga	27	1	22+2	1	2	0	0+1	0
Forwards
7	FW	(Argentina) ARG	Franco Fragapane	34	7	26+4	7	2+1	0	1	0
9	FW	(Paraguay) PAR	Luis Amarilla	36	9	27+6	9	1+1	0	1	0
16	FW	(Canada) CAN	Tani Oluwaseyi	0	0	0	0	0	0	0	0
18	FW	(Ghana) GHA	Abu Danladi	21	3	6+13	2	2	1	0	0
21	FW	(South Africa) RSA	Bongokuhle Hlongwane	33	2	18+11	2	2+1	0	1	0
24	FW	(Jamaica) JAM	Justin McMaster	0	0	0	0	0	0	0	0
28	FW	(Colombia) COL	Ménder García	10	1	6+3	1	0	0	0+1	0
29	FW	(Liberia) LBR	Patrick Weah	0	0	0	0	0	0	0	0
Player(s) transferred out but featured this season
23	MF	(France) FRA	Adrien Hunou	12	2	1+8	0	3	2	0	0
77	DF	(United States) USA	Chase Gasper	1	0	0	0	0+1	0	0	0

=== Goalscorers ===
As of October 17th 2022

Rank	No.	Pos.	Nat.	Name	Major League Soccer	U.S. Open Cup	Playoffs	Total
1	10	MF	(Argentina)	Emanuel Reynoso	10	1	1	12
2	9	FW	(Paraguay)	Luis Amarilla	9	0	0	9
3	7	FW	(Argentina)	Franco Fragapane	7	0	0	7
4	17	FW	(Finland)	Robin Lod	6	0	0	6
5	18	FW	(Ghana)	Abu Danladi	2	1	0	3
5	14	DF	(United States)	Brent Kallman	2	1	0	3
7	21	FW	(South Africa)	Bongokuhle Hlongwane	2	0	0	2
7	23	FW	(France)	Adrien Hunou	0	2	0	2
9	12	DF	(Mali)	Bakaye Dibassy	1	0	0	1
9	33	MF	(Honduras)	Kervin Arriaga	1	0	0	1
9	31	MF	(United States)	Hassani Dotson	1	0	0	1
9	27	DF	(United States)	D.J. Taylor	1	0	0	1
9	92	DF	(Jamaica)	Kemar Lawrence	1	0	0	1
9	2	DF	(Paraguay)	Alan Benítez	1	0	0	1
9	28	FW	(Colombia)	Ménder García	1	0	0	1
9	6	MF	(Mexico)	Jonathan González	1	0	0	1
Own Goals					2	0	0	2
Total					48	5	1	54

=== Assists ===
As of October 17th 2022

Rank	No.	Pos.	Nat.	Name	Major League Soccer	U.S. Open Cup	Playoffs	Total
1	10	MF	(Argentina)	Emanuel Reynoso	11	0	0	11
2	9	FW	(Paraguay)	Luis Amarilla	5	0	0	5
2	21	FW	(South Africa)	Bongokuhle Hlongwane	4	0	1	5
4	7	FW	(Argentina)	Franco Fragapane	2	2	0	4
4	8	MF	(Honduras)	Joseph Rosales	2	2	0	4
6	27	DF	(United States)	D.J. Taylor	3	0	0	3
6	17	FW	(Finland)	Robin Lod	3	0	0	3
8	31	MF	(United States)	Hassani Dotson	2	0	0	2
8	20	MF	(United States)	Wil Trapp	2	0	0	2
8	2	DF	(Paraguay)	Alan Benítez	2	0	0	2
8	92	DF	(Jamaica)	Kemar Lawrence	2	0	0	2
8	23	MF	(France)	Adrien Hunou	1	1	0	2
8	33	MF	(Honduras)	Kervin Arriaga	0	2	0	2
14	5	MF	(United States)	Jacori Hayes	1	0	0	1
14	97	GK	(Canada)	Dayne St. Clair	1	0	0	1
14	11	MF	(Denmark)	Niko Hansen	1	0	0	1

=== Disciplinary record ===
As of October 17th 2022

Rank	No.	Pos.	Nat.	Name	Major League Soccer			U.S. Open Cup			Playoffs			Total		
Rank	No.	Pos.	Nat.	Name	Yellow card	(yellow card) (yellow-red card)	Red card	Yellow card	(yellow card) (yellow-red card)	Red card	Yellow card	(yellow card) (yellow-red card)	Red card	Yellow card	(yellow card) (yellow-red card)	Red card
1	7	FW	(Argentina)	Franco Fragapane	5	1	0	1	0	0	1	0	0	7	1	0
2	8	MF	(Honduras)	Joseph Rosales	4	1	0	0	0	0	0	0	0	4	1	0
3	14	DF	(United States)	Brent Kallman	1	0	0	1	1	0	0	0	0	2	1	0
4	10	MF	(Argentina)	Emanuel Reynoso	10	0	0	0	0	0	0	0	0	10	0	0
4	20	MF	(United States)	Wil Trapp	10	0	0	0	0	0	0	0	0	10	0	0
6	15	DF	(New Zealand)	Michael Boxall	9	0	0	0	0	0	0	0	0	9	0	0
7	33	MF	(Honduras)	Kervin Arriaga	8	0	0	0	0	0	0	0	0	8	0	0
8	17	MF	(Finland)	Robin Lod	7	0	0	0	0	0	0	0	0	7	0	0
9	12	DF	(Mali)	Bakaye Dibassy	4	0	0	0	0	0	0	0	0	4	0	0
9	27	DF	(United States)	D. J. Taylor	3	0	0	0	0	0	1	0	0	4	0	0
11	92	DF	(Jamaica)	Kemar Lawrence	3	0	0	0	0	0	0	0	0	3	0	0
11	9	FW	(Paraguay)	Luis Amarilla	3	0	0	0	0	0	0	0	0	3	0	0
13	2	DF	(Paraguay)	Alan Benítez	2	0	0	0	0	0	0	0	0	2	0	0
13	5	MF	(United States)	Jacori Hayes	1	0	0	1	0	0	0	0	0	2	0	0
15	31	MF	(United States)	Hassani Dotson	1	0	0	0	0	0	0	0	0	1	0	0
15	91	DF	(Jamaica)	Oniel Fisher	1	0	0	0	0	0	0	0	0	1	0	0
15	97	GK	(Canada)	Dayne St. Clair	1	0	0	0	0	0	0	0	0	1	0	0
15	23	MF	(France)	Adrien Hunou	1	0	0	0	0	0	0	0	0	1	0	0
15	18	FW	(Ghana)	Abu Danladi	1	0	0	0	0	0	0	0	0	1	0	0
15	77	DF	(United States)	Chase Gasper	0	0	0	1	0	0	0	0	0	1	0	0
15	21	FW	(South Africa)	Bongokuhle Hlongwane	0	0	0	1	0	0	0	0	0	1	0	0
Totals					75	2	0	5	1	0	2	0	0	82	3	0

=== Clean sheets ===
As of October 17th 2022

Rank	No.	Pos.	Nat.	Name	Major League Soccer	U.S. Open Cup	Playoffs	Total
1	97	GK	(Canada)	Dayne St. Clair	5	0	0	5
2	1	GK	(United States)	Tyler Miller	0	1	0	1

== Honors and awards ==
=== Bell Bank Man of the Match ===
Note: Bell Bank Man of the Match is voted on by fans on Twitter near the end of each MLS Match.

Player	Position	Times Won	Most Recent
Dayne St. Clair	GK	8	Oct. 9th vs Vancouver Whitecaps FC
Emanuel Reynoso	MF	6	Aug. 27th vs Houston Dynamo
Luis Amarilla	FW	3	Aug. 6th at Colorado Rapids
Bongokuhle Hlongwane	FW	3	Jul. 30th vs Portland Timbers
D.J. Taylor	DF	2	Sept. 3rd vs FC Dallas
Michael Boxall	DF	2	Jul. 13th vs Sporting Kansas City
Kemar Lawrence	DF	2	Jul. 8th at Vancouver Whitecaps FC
Robin Lod	MF	2	Sept. 10th at Portland Timbers
Hassani Dotson	MF	1	Mar. 5th vs Nashville SC
Franco Fragapane	FW	1	Aug. 20th vs Austin FC
Brent Kallman	DF	1	Sept. 13th vs Los Angeles FC
Ménder García	FW	1	Sept. 17th vs Sporting Kansas City

Note: Bell Bank Man of the Match was not awarded after the game against Real Salt Lake on August 31 and San Jose Earthquakes on October 1.

=== MLS Team of the Week ===
Week	Player	Opponent	Position	Ref
1	(Finland) Robin Lod	Philadelphia Union	Bench	
2	(Mali) Bakaye Dibassy	Nashville SC	DF	
3	(Canada) Dayne St. Clair	New York Red Bulls	GK	
4	(Mali) Bakaye Dibassy	San Jose	Bench	
6	(New Zealand) Michael Boxall	Austin FC	Bench	
7	(Finland) Robin Lod	Colorado Rapids	MF	
7	(Argentina) Emanuel Reynoso	Colorado Rapids	Bench	
8	(Argentina) Emanuel Reynoso	Chicago Fire SC	MF	
12	(Argentina) Emanuel Reynoso	LA Galaxy	Bench	
13	(United States) D.J. Taylor	FC Dallas	Bench	
17	(Argentina) Emanuel Reynoso	LA Galaxy	MF	
18	(Argentina) Emanuel Reynoso	Real Salt Lake	MF	
21	(Argentina) Emanuel Reynoso	D.C. United	MF	
22	(South Africa) Bongokuhle Hlongwane	Houston Dynamo FC	MF	
22	(New Zealand) Michael Boxall	Houston Dynamo FC	DF	
23	(Paraguay) Luis Amarilla	Portland Timbers	FW	
25	(Canada) Dayne St. Clair	Nashville SC	GK	
31	(United States) Brent Kallman	Sporting Kansas City	Bench	

=== MLS Player of the Week ===
Week	Player	Opponent	Ref
3	(Canada) Dayne St. Clair	New York Red Bulls	
21	(Argentina) Emanuel Reynoso	D.C. United	

=== MLS All-Stars ===
Player	Position	Ref
(Argentina) Emanuel Reynoso	MF	
(Canada) Dayne St. Clair	GK	
