= Franco Fragapane =

Argentine footballer

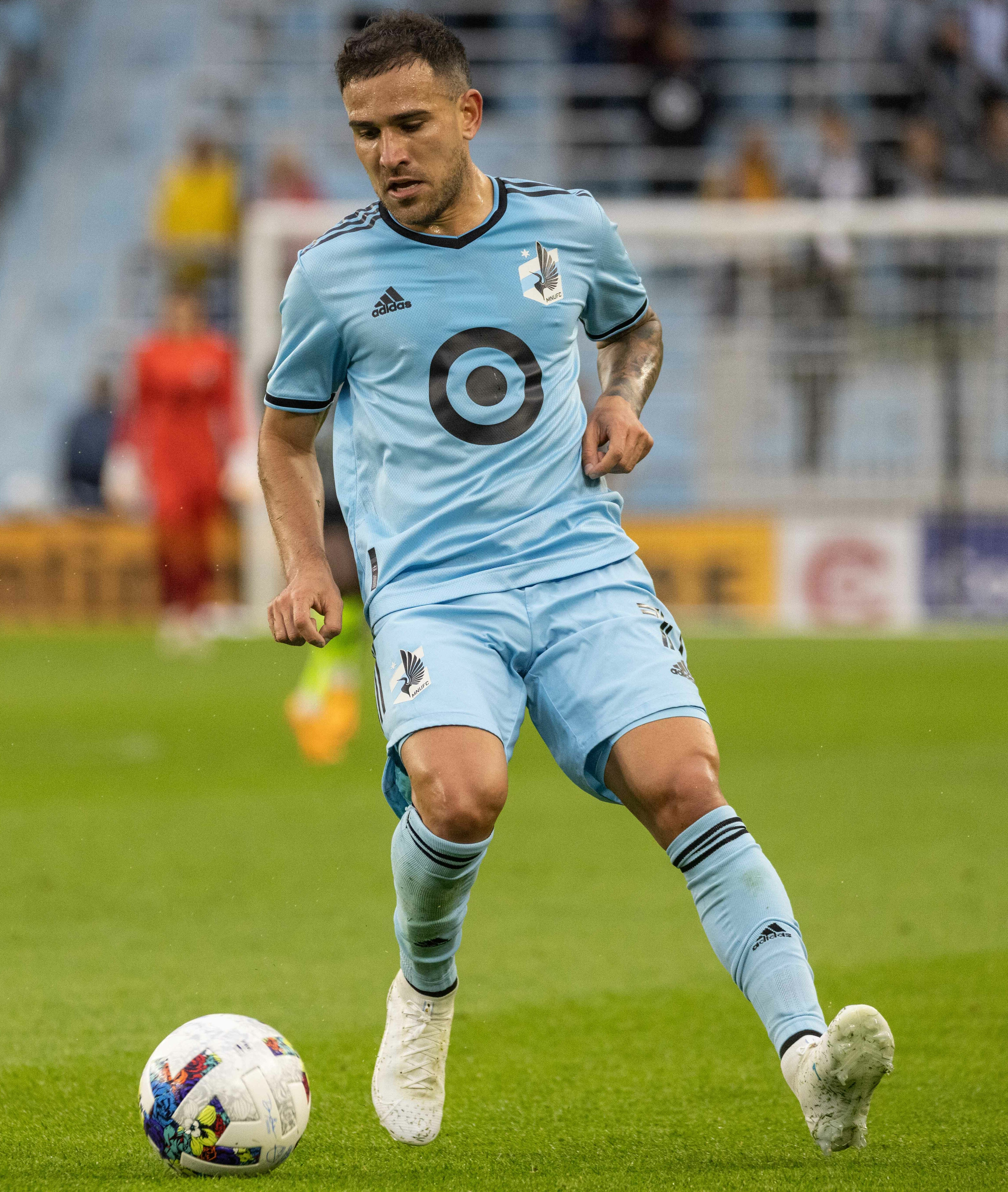
- Fragapane with Minnesota United in 2022

Personal information
- Full name: Franco Rodrigo Fragapane
- Date of birth: 6 February 1993 (age 33)
- Place of birth: Las Heras, Argentina
- Height: 1.70 m (5 ft 7 in)
- Position: Winger

Team information
- Current team: Unión Santa Fe
- Number: 7

Youth career
- Huracán Las Heras
- EF Ariel Gómez
- 2005–2013: Boca Juniors

Senior career*
Years	Team	Apps	(Gls)
2012–2016	Boca Juniors	3	(0)
2014–2015	→ Elche (loan)	1	(0)
2014–2015	→ Elche Ilicitano (loan)	27	(4)
2015–2016	→ Celta B (loan)	28	(8)
2016–2017	Arsenal de Sarandí	23	(0)
2017–2019	Unión de Santa Fe	52	(10)
2019–2021	Talleres	47	(8)
2020	→ Fortaleza (loan)	9	(0)
2021–2024	Minnesota United	111	(16)
2025–	Unión Santa Fe	38	(1)

International career
2011	Argentina U23	5	(1)
- * Club domestic league appearances and goals as of 16:34, 4 June 2026 (UTC)

Franco Rodrigo Fragapane (born 6 February 1993) is an Argentine professional footballer who plays as a winger for Argentine Primera División club Unión Santa Fe.

== Club career ==
Born in Las Heras, Mendoza, Fragapane joined Boca Juniors' youth setup in 2005, aged 12, after impressing in a trial. He played his first match as a professional on 1 March 2012, coming on as a late substitute in a 2–0 home success over Central Córdoba de Rosario, for the season's Copa Argentina.

Fragapane played regularly with the reserve side during the following seasons, and made his Primera División debut on 8 December 2013, again from the bench in a 1–1 home draw against Gimnasia La Plata. He appeared in two further matches during the campaign, with Boca finishing second overall.

On 12 July 2014 Fragapane moved abroad for the first time in his career, joining Spanish Segunda División B side Elche CF Ilicitano on loan, with a buyout clause. On 6 December he made his debut with the main squad, replacing Coro in a 0–2 La Liga home loss against Atlético Madrid.

On 7 August 2015 Fragapane joined another reserve team, Celta de Vigo B on loan for one year.

On 1 July 2021, Fragapane was named as the player who allegedly directed a racial slur towards Portland Timbers player Diego Chará during a game on 26 June 2021. MLS conducted an internal investigation and could not confirm or refute the allegation took place.

== International career ==
Fragapane was one of the 22-man selected for 2011 Pan American Games. He appeared five times during the tournament, scoring once (against Costa Rica on 21 October 2011).

== Career statistics ==
As of match played on 28 May 2023

Club statistics
Club	Season	League			Cup		Other		Total	
Club	Season	Division	Apps	Goals	Apps	Goals	Apps	Goals	Apps	Goals
Boca Juniors	2011–12	Argentine Primera División	0	0	1	0	—		1	0
Boca Juniors	2013–14	Argentine Primera División	3	0	0	0	—		3	0
Boca Juniors	Total		3	0	1	0	0	0	4	0
Elche CF (loan)	2014–15	La Liga	1	0	2	0	—		3	0
Elche Ilicitano (loan)	2014–15	Segunda División B	27	4	—		—		27	4
Celta Vigo B (loan)	2015–16	Segunda División B	28	8	—		—		28	8
Arsenal de Sarandí	2016–17	Argentine Primera División	23	0	2	1	—		25	1
Arsenal de Sarandí	2017–18	Argentine Primera División	0	0	1	1	4 (Note: Appearances in the Copa Sudamericana)	0	5	1
Arsenal de Sarandí	Total		23	0	3	2	4	0	30	2
Unión de Santa Fe	2017–18	Argentine Primera División	25	3	1	0	—		26	3
Unión de Santa Fe	2018–19	Argentine Primera División	24	7	2	1	—		26	8
Unión de Santa Fe	2019–20	Argentine Primera División	3	0	1	0	4	0	8	0
Unión de Santa Fe	Total		52	10	4	1	4	0	60	11
Talleres de Córdoba	2019–20	Argentine Primera División	34	5	2	0	—		36	5
Talleres de Córdoba	2021	Argentine Primera División	13	3	2	0	5	1	20	4
Talleres de Córdoba	Total		47	8	4	0	5	1	56	9
Fortaleza (loan)	2020	Campeonato Brasileiro Série A	9	0	0	0	—		9	0
Minnesota United FC	2021	Major League Soccer	19	5	0	0	1 (Note: Appearance in the 2021 MLS Cup Playoffs)	1	20	6
Minnesota United FC	2022	Major League Soccer	30	7	3	0	1 (Note: Appearance in the 2022 MLS Cup Playoffs)	0	34	7
Minnesota United FC	2023	Major League Soccer	14	0	3	1	—		17	1
Minnesota United FC	Total		63	12	6	1	2	1	71	8
Career totals			253	42	18	4	15	2	286	48
