= 2021 Minnesota United FC season =

Minnesota United FC
2021 season
- Owner: Bill McGuire
- Head coach: Adrian Heath
- Major League Soccer: Conference: 5th Overall: 11th
- MLS Cup Playoffs: Conf. Semi-Finals
- U.S. Open Cup: Canceled
- Biggest win: MIN 3–0 LAG (9/18)
- Biggest defeat: SEA 4–0 MIN (4/16); SKC 4–0 MIN (9/15)
Home colors	Away colors

The 2021 Minnesota United FC season was the club's twelfth season of existence, and fifth in Major League Soccer. Their season began on April 16, 2021 where they lost to the Seattle Sounders FC 4-0 in Seattle. The club will play its home matches at Allianz Field in Saint Paul, Minnesota. The club reached the MLS Cup Playoffs for a third consecutive year, but lost in their first match to the Portland Timbers.

== Competitions ==
=== Preseason ===
Win Draw Loss

March 27 Friendly	Minnesota United FC	9–0	Charleston Battery	Deltona, Florida
8:00 PM CT	Finlay; Hansen; Agudelo; Alonso; Langsdorf; McMaster; Weah	Recap		Stadium: Dewey O. Boster Sports Complex; Attendance: 0
Note: Match was played behind closed doors

March 31 Friendly	Minnesota United FC	5–2	Columbus Crew SC
		Recap	Morris 76'; Wright-Phillips 88'	Attendance: 0
Note: Match was played behind closed doors

April 3 Friendly	Minnesota United FC	3–1	FC Cincinnati	Citrus Ridge, Florida
	Reynoso (pen.); Finlay (pen.); McMaster	Recap	Brenner (pen.)	Stadium: ChampionsGate Sports Complex; Attendance: 0
Note: Match was played behind closed doors

April 9 Friendly	Minnesota United FC	2–3	Orlando City SC	Orlando, Florida
10:00 am CDT	Hansen; McMaster	Report	Urso; Pato; van der Water	Stadium: Exploria Stadium; Attendance: 0
Note: Match was played behind closed doors

=== MLS regular season ===
==== Standings ====
===== Overall =====
Pos	Team	Pld	W	L	T	GF	GA	GD	Pts
9	Atlanta United FC	34	13	9	12	45	37	+8	51
10	Orlando City SC	34	13	9	12	50	48	+2	51
11	Minnesota United FC	34	13	11	10	42	44	−2	49
12	Vancouver Whitecaps FC	34	12	9	13	45	45	0	49
13	Real Salt Lake	34	14	14	6	55	54	+1	48

Source: MLS
Rules for classification: 1) points; 2) total wins; 3) total goal differential; 4) total goals scored; 5) fewer disciplinary points; 6) away goal differential; 7) away goals scored; 8) home goals differential; 9) home goals scored; 10) coin toss (2 clubs tied) or drawing of lots (≥3 clubs tied)

===== Western Conference =====
Pos	Team	Pld	W	L	T	GF	GA	GD	Pts	Qualification
1	Colorado Rapids	34	17	7	10	51	35	+16	61	MLS Cup Conference Semifinals
2	Seattle Sounders FC	34	17	8	9	53	33	+20	60	MLS Cup First Round
3	Sporting Kansas City	34	17	10	7	58	40	+18	58	MLS Cup First Round
4	Portland Timbers	34	17	13	4	56	52	+4	55	MLS Cup First Round
5	Minnesota United FC	34	13	11	10	42	44	−2	49	MLS Cup First Round
6	Vancouver Whitecaps FC	34	12	9	13	45	45	0	49	MLS Cup First Round
7	Real Salt Lake	34	14	14	6	55	54	+1	48	MLS Cup First Round
8	LA Galaxy	34	13	12	9	50	54	−4	48	
9	Los Angeles FC	34	12	13	9	53	51	+2	45	
10	San Jose Earthquakes	34	10	13	11	46	54	−8	41	
11	FC Dallas	34	7	15	12	47	56	−9	33	
12	Austin FC	34	9	21	4	35	56	−21	31	
13	Houston Dynamo FC	34	6	16	12	36	54	−18	30	

Source: MLS
Rules for classification: 1) points; 2) total wins; 3) total goal differential; 4) total goals scored; 5) fewer disciplinary points; 6) away goal differential; 7) away goals scored; 8) home goals differential; 9) home goals scored; 10) coin toss (2 clubs tied) or drawing of lots (≥3 clubs tied)

==== Results summary ====
Overall								Home						Away					
Pld	Pts	W	L	T	GF	GA	GD	W	L	T	GF	GA	GD	W	L	T	GF	GA	GD
25	37	10	8	7	29	29	0	8	3	2	17	7	+10	2	5	5	12	22	−10

Last updated: September 26, 2021
Source: MLS Results
Pld = Matches played; Pts = Points; W = Matches won; T = Matches tied; L = Matches lost; GF = Goals for; GA = Goals against; GD = Goal difference

==== Regular season ====
April 16, 2021 1	Seattle Sounders FC	4–0	Minnesota United FC	Seattle, Washington
8:30 PM CDT	Arreaga (yellow card) 44'; João Paulo 49' (yellow card) 54'; Ruidíaz 70, 73'; Montero 86'; C. Roldan (yellow card) 90'	Report	Reynoso (yellow card) 32'; Gasper (yellow card) 76'	Stadium: Lumen Field; Attendance: 7,042; Referee: Joseph Dickerson

April 24, 2021 2	Minnesota United	1–2	Real Salt Lake	Saint Paul, Minnesota
7:00 PM CDT	Lod 86'	Report	Luiz (yellow card) 24'; Julio 31, 41'; Ruiz (yellow card) 35'; Meram (yellow card) 73'	Stadium: Allianz Field; Attendance: 4,100; Referee: Drew Fischer

May 1, 2021 3	Minnesota United	0–1	Austin FC	Saint Paul, Minnesota
7:00 PM CDT	Alonso (yellow card) 41'; Boxall (yellow card) 60'; Gasper (yellow card) 90+6'	Report	Fagúndez 17'; Romaña (yellow card) 74'; Berhalter (yellow card) 81'	Stadium: Allianz Field; Attendance: 4,100; Referee: Ramy Touchan

May 8, 2021 4	Colorado Rapids	3–2	Minnesota United	Commerce City, Colorado
9:00 PM CDT	Acosta (yellow card) 28', (goal) 57'; Rubio (yellow card) 35'; Bassett 71'; Wilson 82'; Vines (yellow card) 90+1'	Report	Reynoso 17'; Dotson 24'; Greguš (yellow card) 45+3'; Gasper (yellow card) 81'	Stadium: Dick's Sporting Goods Park; Referee: Timothy Ford

May 12, 2021 5	Minnesota United	1–0	Vancouver Whitecaps FC	Saint Paul, Minnesota
8:00 PM CDT	Boxall (yellow card) 29'; Ábila 72' (yellow card) 74'; Alonso (yellow card) 90+4'	Report	Gaspar (yellow card) 31'; Alexandre (yellow card) 58'; Cornelius (yellow card) 76'	Stadium: Allianz Field; Attendance: 4,100; Referee: Jon Freeman

May 15, 2021 6	Minnesota United	1–0	FC Dallas	Saint Paul, Minnesota
7:00 PM CDT	Trapp (yellow card) 67'; Lod 90+4'	Report	Ricaurte (yellow card) 10'; Jara (yellow card) 59'	Stadium: Allianz Field; Attendance: 4,100; Referee: Ted Unkel

May 29, 2021 7	Real Salt Lake	1–1	Minnesota United	Sandy, Utah
8:30 PM CDT	Kreilach 13'	Report	Hansen 78'	Stadium: Rio Tinto Stadium; Attendance: 10,853; Referee: Jair Marrufo

June 19, 2021 8	FC Dallas	1–1	Minnesota United	Frisco, Texas
7:30 PM CDT	Pepi 68', (yellow card) 84'; Jara (yellow card) 89'	Report	Dibassy (yellow card) 2'; Fragapane 36'; Gasper (yellow card) 67'; Boxall (yellow card) 89'	Stadium: Toyota Stadium; Attendance: 16,455; Referee: Marcos De Oliveira

June 23, 2021 9	Minnesota United	2–0	Austin FC	Saint Paul, Minnesota
7:00 PM CDT	Fragapane 10'; Hunou 18'	Report	Romaña (yellow card) 16'; Fagúndez (yellow card) 39'	Stadium: Allianz Field; Attendance: 19,209; Referee: Silviu Petrescu

June 26, 2021 10	Portland Timbers	0–1	Minnesota United	Portland, Oregon
9:30 PM CDT	Bravo (yellow card) 15'; Chará (yellow card) 70'	Report	Hunou 2'; Dotson (yellow card) 74'; Reynoso (yellow card) 85'	Stadium: Providence Park; Referee: Rosendo Mendoza

July 3, 2021 11	Minnesota United	2–2	San Jose Earthquakes	Saint Paul, Minnesota
7:00 PM CDT	Kallman 45+4'; Ábila 69'; Dibassy (yellow card) 85'; Alonso (yellow card) 90+5'	Report	Cowell 15'; Remedi (yellow card) 32'; Espinoza (yellow card) 68'; Kikanovic 82'; Marie (yellow card) 90+5'	Stadium: Allianz Field; Attendance: 19,687; Referee: Michael Radchuk

July 7, 2021 12	Colorado Rapids	2–0	Minnesota United	Commerce City, Colorado
8:00 PM CDT	Bassett (yellow card) 36'; Galván 45', (yellow card) 45+1'; Shinyashiki 81'; Wilson (yellow card) 83'	Report	Alonso (yellow card) 36'; Ábila (red card) 86'	Stadium: Dick's Sporting Goods Park; Referee: Ted Unkel

July 18, 2021 13	Minnesota United	1–0	Seattle Sounders FC	Saint Paul, Minnesota
1:00 PM CT	Lod 81'	Report	Leyva (yellow card) 13'; Andrade (yellow card) 18'; Arreaga (yellow card) 63'	Stadium: Allianz Field; Attendance: 19,679; Referee: Alan Kelly

July 24, 2021 14	Minnesota United	2–1	Portland Timbers	Saint Paul, Minnesota
7:00 PM CDT	Gasper 74'; Lod 85', (yellow card) 90+4'	Report	Mora 10'	Stadium: Allianz Field; Attendance: 19,691; Referee: Marcos De Oliviera

July 28, 2021 15	Los Angeles FC	2–2	Minnesota United	Los Angeles, California
9:30 PM CDT	Vela 40'; Blackmon 77'	Report	Reynoso 49'; Dibassy (yellow card) 59'; Trapp (yellow card) 67'; Dotson 90+5'	Stadium: Banc of California Stadium; Attendance: 22,118; Referee: Baldomero Toledo

July 31, 2021 16	Vancouver Whitecaps FC	2–2	Minnesota United	Salt Lake City, Utah
9:00 PM CDT	Baldisimo (yellow card) 34'; Dájome 36', 90+4' (pen.); Ricketts (yellow card) 86'; Bikel (yellow card) 87'	Report	Finlay 45'; Métanire (yellow card) 45+2'; Taylor (yellow card) 48'; Trapp (yellow card) 55'; Lod 75'	Stadium: Rio Tinto Stadium; Referee: Lukasz Szpala

August 7, 2021 17	Minnesota United	2–0	Houston Dynamo FC	Saint Paul, Minnesota
7:00 PM CDT	Lod 14'; Kallman 71'	Report	Rodríguez (yellow card) 21'; Junqua (yellow card) 21'; Jones (yellow card) 62'	Stadium: Allianz Field; Attendance: 19,625; Referee: Silviu Petrescu

August 14, 2021 18	Minnesota United	0–1	LA Galaxy	Saint Paul, Minnesota
5:00 PM CDT	Gasper (yellow card) 8'	Report	Joveljić (yellow card) 25'; Cabral 43', (yellow card) 64'; Vázquez (yellow card) 90'	Stadium: Allianz Field; Attendance: 19,625; Referee: Joseph Dickerson

August 17, 2021 19	San Jose Earthquakes	1–1	Minnesota United	Santa Clara, California
9:30 PM CDT	Dibassy 12' (o.g.); Nathan (red card) 21'; M. López (yellow card) 90+4'	Report	Trapp 22'; Taylor (yellow card) 82'; Dibassy (yellow card) 89'	Stadium: PayPal Park; Attendance: 10,353; Referee: Victor Rivas

August 21, 2021 20	Minnesota United	0–0	Sporting Kansas City	Saint Paul, Minnesota
2:30 PM CDT	Dibassy (yellow card) 6'; Métanire (yellow card) 59'	Report	Walter (red card) 21'; Russell (yellow card) 25'; Zusi (yellow card) 69'; Sallói (yellow card) 86'; Espinoza (yellow card) 90+1'	Stadium: Allianz Field; Referee: Marcos de Oliveira

August 28, 2021 21	Houston Dynamo	1–2	Minnesota United	Houston, Texas
7:30 PM CDT	Carrasquilla 1'; Dorsey (yellow card) 61'; Hadebe (yellow card) 73'; Valentin (yellow card) 77'	Report	Hunou 16', 73'	Stadium: BBVA Compass Stadium; Attendance: 14,521; Referee: Ted Unkel

September 11, 2021 22	Seattle Sounders FC	1–0	Minnesota United	Seattle, Washington
4:00 PM CDT	João Paulo 22'; Gómez (yellow card) 37'; O'Neill (yellow card) 90+4'	Report	Alonso (yellow card) 47'; Hunou (yellow card) 49'; Gasper (yellow card) 77'; Hayes (yellow card) 85'	Stadium: Lumen Field; Attendance: 33,130; Referee: Alex Chilowicz

September 15, 2021 23	Sporting Kansas City	4–0	Minnesota United FC	Kansas City, Kansas
7:30 PM CDT	Shelton 14'; Sallói 36'; Russell 45' (pen.); Duke 52'	Report	Fragapane (yellow card) 50'	Stadium: Children's Mercy Park; Attendance: 16,888; Referee: Robert Sibiga

September 18, 2021 24	Minnesota United FC	3–0	LA Galaxy	Saint Paul, Minnesota
5:00	Reynoso 4', 20'; Finlay 66'; Hayes (yellow card) 82'	Recap	Araujo (yellow card) 50'	Stadium: Allianz Field; Attendance: 19,400; Referee: Jair Marrufo

September 25, 2021 25	Minnesota United	2–0	Houston Dynamo	Saint Paul, Minnesota
7:00 PM CDT	Lod 1'; Finlay 17'; Reynoso (yellow card) 40'	Report	Quintero (yellow card) 41'; Junqua (yellow card) 72'	Stadium: Allianz Field; Attendance: 19,471; Referee: Allen Chapman

September 29, 2021 26	DC United	3–1	Minnesota United	Washington DC
7:00 PM CDT	Kamara 23'; Gressel 45'; Birnbaum (yellow card) 59'; Arriola (yellow card) 66'; Moreno 85'	Report	Hayes (yellow card) 18'; Dibassy 40'; Trapp (yellow card) 43'; Kallman (yellow card) 79'; Gasper (yellow card) 88'	Stadium: Audi Field; Attendance: 12,262; Referee: Ramy Touchan

October 2, 2021 27	FC Dallas	0–0	Minnesota United	Frisco, Texas
7:00 PM CDT	Servania (yellow card) 16'	Report	Alonso (yellow card) 34'; Reynoso (red card) 89'	Stadium: Toyota Stadium; Attendance: 17,231; Referee: Rubiel Velazquez

October 9, 2021 28	Minnesota United	1–3	Colorado Rapids	Saint Paul, Minnesota
7:00 PM CDT	Hunou 8', (yellow card) 54'	Report	Warner (yellow card) 35'; Wilson (red card) 57'; Bassett 73' (pen.); Barrios 84'; Esteves 90+3'	Stadium: Allianz Field; Referee: Jon Freemon

October 16, 2021 29	Austin FC	0–1	Minnesota United	Austin, Texas
8:00 PM CDT	Cascante (yellow card) 42'	Report	Fragapane 16'; Reynoso (yellow card) 59'; Gasper (yellow card) 90+2'; Alonso (yellow card) 90+3'	Stadium: Q2 Stadium; Attendance: 20,738; Referee: Michael Radchuk

October 20, 2021 30	Minnesota United	3–2	Philadelphia Union	Saint Paul, Minnesota
7:00 PM CT	Hunou 41'; Lod 63'; Fragapane 67'; Métanire (red card) 77'; Reynoso (yellow card) 83'	Report	Mbaizo (yellow card) 5'; Gazdag 45', 54'; Wagner (yellow card) 78'	Stadium: Allianz Field; Referee: Allen Chapman

October 23, 2021 31	Minnesota United	1–1	Los Angeles FC	Saint Paul, Minnesota
7:00 PM CDT	Trapp (yellow card) 32'; Gasper (yellow card) 56'; Alonso 65'; Dibassy (yellow card) 88'	Report	Arango 32'; Murillo (yellow card) 63'; Cifuentes (yellow card) 74'	Stadium: Allianz Field; Attendance: 19,406; Referee: Robert Sibiga

October 27, 2021 32	Vancouver Whitecaps FC	2–1	Minnesota United	Vancouver, BC
9:00 PM CDT	Jungwirth (yellow card) 38'; Boxall 45' (o.g.); White 63'; Brown (yellow card) 82'	Report	Dotson (yellow card) 84'; Reynoso (yellow card) 90'; Adi 90+1'	Stadium: BC Place; Referee: Nima Saghafi

October 31, 2021 33	Minnesota United	2–1	Sporting Kansas City	Saint Paul, Minnesota
12:00 PM CDT	Fragapane 20' (pen.), (yellow card) 84'; Reynoso 39'; Alonso (yellow card) 73'	Report	Shelton 8'; Duke (yellow card) 48'; Kinda (yellow card) 79'; Dia (yellow card) 86'	Stadium: Allianz Field; Referee: Victor Rivas

November 7, 2021 34	LA Galaxy	3–3	Minnesota United	Carson, California
5:00 PM CST	Araujo (yellow card) 41'; Lletget 45+1'; Hernández 51', 75'	Report	Dibassy (yellow card) 2'; Hunou 22'; Lod 34'; Araujo 62' (o.g.); Reynoso (yellow card) 73'	Stadium: Dignity Health Sports Park; Attendance: 23,803; Referee: Kevin Stott

==== MLS Cup Playoffs ====
November 21 Conf. Semi-Finals	Portland Timbers	3–1	Minnesota United FC	Portland, Oregon
14:30 PST	Blanco (yellow card) 19', (goal) 46', 66'; Mabiala 43', (yellow card) 86'	Report	Fragapane 11', (yellow card) 85'; Trapp (yellow card) 32'; Gasper (yellow card) 40'; Boxall (yellow card) 73'; Dibassy (yellow card) 90+7'	Stadium: Providence Park; Attendance: 22,533; Referee: Armando Villarreal

=== U.S. Open Cup ===
The 2021 edition of the U.S. Open Cup was initially postponed before being fully canceled on July 20, 2021.

== Statistics ==
=== Appearances and goals ===
Last updated 26 September 2021.

No.	Pos	Nat	Player	Total		Major League Soccer		US Open Cup		Playoffs	
No.	Pos	Nat	Player	Apps	Goals	Apps	Goals	Apps	Goals	Apps	Goals
Goalkeepers
1	GK	(United States) USA	Tyler Miller	21	0	21	0	0	0	0	0
30	GK	(United States) USA	Adrian Zendejas	0	0	0	0	0	0	0	0
97	GK	(Canada) CAN	Dayne St. Clair	4	0	4	0	0	0	0	0
99	GK	(Luxembourg) LUX	Fred Emmings	0	0	0	0	0	0	0	0
Defenders
2	DF	(New Zealand) NZL	Noah Billingsley	0	0	0	0	0	0	0	0
4	DF	(Canada) CAN	Callum Montgomery	0	0	0	0	0	0	0	0
12	DF	(Mali) MLI	Bakaye Dibassy	17	0	17	0	0	0	0	0
14	DF	(United States) USA	Brent Kallman	17	2	11+6	2	0	0	0	0
15	DF	(New Zealand) NZL	Michael Boxall	17	0	17	0	0	0	0	0
19	DF	(Madagascar) MAD	Romain Métanire	22	0	22	0	0	0	0	0
22	DF	(Finland) FIN	Jukka Raitala	9	0	6+3	0	0	0	0	0
26	DF	(United States) USA	DJ Taylor	7	0	5+2	0	0	0	0	0
36	DF	(United States) USA	Nabilai Kibunguchy	0	0	0	0	0	0	0	0
77	DF	(United States) USA	Chase Gasper	22	1	22	1	0	0	0	0
Midfielders
5	MF	(United States) USA	Jacori Hayes	14	0	6+8	0	0	0	0	0
6	MF	(Cuba) CUB	Osvaldo Alonso	17	0	9+8	0	0	0	0	0
7	MF	(Argentina) ARG	Franco Fragapane	10	2	10	2	0	0	0	0
8	MF	(Slovakia) SVK	Ján Greguš	14	0	9+5	0	0	0	0	0
10	MF	(Argentina) ARG	Emanuel Reynoso	21	4	20+1	4	0	0	0	0
11	MF	(Denmark) DEN	Niko Hansen	9	1	5+4	1	0	0	0	0
13	MF	(United States) USA	Ethan Finlay	21	2	15+6	2	0	0	0	0
17	MF	(Finland) FIN	Robin Lod	15	7	14+1	7	0	0	0	0
18	MF	(Honduras) HON	Joseph Rosales	2	0	0+2	0	0	0	0	0
20	MF	(United States) USA	Wil Trapp	24	1	24	1	0	0	0	0
24	MF	(Jamaica) JAM	Justin McMaster	7	0	0+7	0	0	0	0	0
25	MF	(United States) USA	Aziel Jackson	0	0	0	0	0	0	0	0
31	MF	(United States) USA	Hassani Dotson	22	2	20+2	2	0	0	0	0
Forwards
9	FW	(Nigeria) NGA	Fanendo Adi	3	0	1+2	0	0	0	0	0
9	FW	(Argentina) ARG	Ramón Ábila	10	2	1+9	2	0	0	0	0
21	FW	(United States) USA	Juan Agudelo	11	0	1+10	0	0	0	0	0
23	FW	(France) FRA	Adrien Hunou	18	4	15+3	4	0	0	0	0
27	FW	(United States) USA	Foster Langsdorf	1	0	0+1	0	0	0	0	0
29	FW	(United States) USA	Patrick Weah	2	0	0+2	0	0	0	0	0

=== Assists and shutouts ===
- Stats from MLS regular season, MLS playoffs, CONCACAF Champions league, and U.S. Open Cup are all included.
- First tie-breaker for assists and shutouts is minutes played.

As of 26 September 2021

Assists
Rank	Player	Nation	Assists	Matches Played	Minutes played
1	Franco Fragapane	(Argentina)	6	10	788
2	Robin Lod	(Finland)	4	15	1216
3	Emanuel Reynoso	(Argentina)	3	21	1678
4	Ethan Finlay	(United States)	2	21	1375
5	Justin McMaster	(Jamaica)	1	7	128
	Niko Hansen	(Denmark)	1	9	393
	Jan Gregus	(Slovakia)	1	14	754
	Adrien Hunou	(France)	1	18	1178
	Hassani Dotson	(United States)	1	22	1829
	Romain Metanire	(Jamaica)	1	22	1943
	Wil Trapp	(United States)	1	24	2121

Shutouts
Rank	Player	Nation	Shutouts	Matches Played	Minutes played
1	Tyler Miller	(United States)	9	21	1890
2	Dayne St. Clair	(Canada)	0	4	360

== Club ==
=== Roster ===
As of August 27, 2021

No.	Name	Nationality	Position	Date of birth (age)	Signed from
Goalkeepers
1	Tyler Miller	(United States)	GK	12 March 1993 (age 32)	(United States) Los Angeles FC
30	Adrian Zendejas	(United States)	GK	30 August 1995 (age 30)	(United States) Nashville SC
97	Dayne St. Clair	(Canada)	GK	9 May 1997 (age 28)	(United States) Maryland Terrapins
99	Fred Emmings (HGP)	(Luxembourg)	GK	8 February 2004 (age 21)	(United States) MNUFC Academy
Defenders
2	Noah Billingsley	(New Zealand)	DF	6 August 1997 (age 28)	(United States) UC Santa Barbara
4	Callum Montgomery	(Canada)	DF	14 May 1997 (age 28)	(United States) FC Dallas
12	Bakaye Dibassy	(Mali)	DF	11 August 1989 (age 36)	(France) Amiens SC
14	Brent Kallman	(United States)	DF	4 October 1990 (age 35)	(United States) Minnesota United FC (NASL)
15	Michael Boxall	(New Zealand)	DF	18 August 1988 (age 37)	(South Africa) SuperSport United
19	Romain Métanire	(Madagascar)	DF	28 March 1990 (age 35)	(France) Stade Reims
22	Jukka Raitala	(Finland)	DF	15 September 1988 (age 37)	(Canada) Montreal Impact
26	DJ Taylor	(United States)	DF	26 August 1997 (age 28)	(United States) North Carolina FC
36	Nabilai Kibunguchy	(United States)	DF	5 January 1998 (age 28)	(United States) UC Davis Aggies
77	Chase Gasper	(United States)	DF	25 January 1996 (age 30)	(United States) FC Golden State Force
Midfielders
5	Jacori Hayes	(United States)	MF	29 June 1995 (age 30)	(United States) FC Dallas
6	Osvaldo Alonso	(Cuba)	MF	11 November 1985 (age 40)	(United States) Seattle Sounders FC
7	Franco Fragapane	(Argentina)	MF	6 February 1993 (age 32)	(Argentina) Talleres
8	Ján Greguš (DP)	(Slovakia)	MF	29 January 1991 (age 35)	(Denmark) Copenhagen
10	Emanuel Reynoso (DP)	(Argentina)	MF	16 November 1995 (age 30)	(Argentina) Boca Juniors
11	Niko Hansen	(Denmark)	MF	14 September 1994 (age 31)	(United States) Houston Dynamo FC
13	Ethan Finlay	(United States)	MF	6 August 1990 (age 35)	(United States) Columbus Crew SC
17	Robin Lod	(Finland)	MF	17 April 1993 (age 32)	(Spain) Sporting Gijón
18	Joseph Rosales (on loan from CA Independiente)	(Honduras)	MF	6 November 2000 (age 25)	(Argentina) CA Independiente
20	Wil Trapp	(United States)	MF	15 January 1993 (age 33)	(United States) Inter Miami CF
24	Justin McMaster	(Jamaica)	MF	30 June 1999 (age 26)	(United States) Wake Forest Demon Deacons
25	Aziel Jackson (HGP)	(United States)	MF	25 October 2001 (age 24)	(United States) New York Red Bulls
31	Hassani Dotson	(United States)	MF	6 August 1997 (age 28)	(United States) Lane United FC
-	Thomás Chacón (on loan to Liverpool)	(Uruguay)	MF	17 August 2000 (age 25)	(Uruguay) Danubio
Forwards
9	Fanendo Adi	(Nigeria)	FW	10 October 1990 (age 35)	Free agent
21	Juan Agudelo	(United States)	FW	23 November 1992 (age 33)	(United States) Inter Miami CF
23	Adrien Hunou (DP)	(France)	FW	19 January 1994 (age 32)	(France) Rennes
29	Patrick Weah	(United States)	FW	5 December 2003 (age 22)	(United States) Saint Louis Billikens
