= Dayne St. Clair =

Canadian soccer player (born 1997)

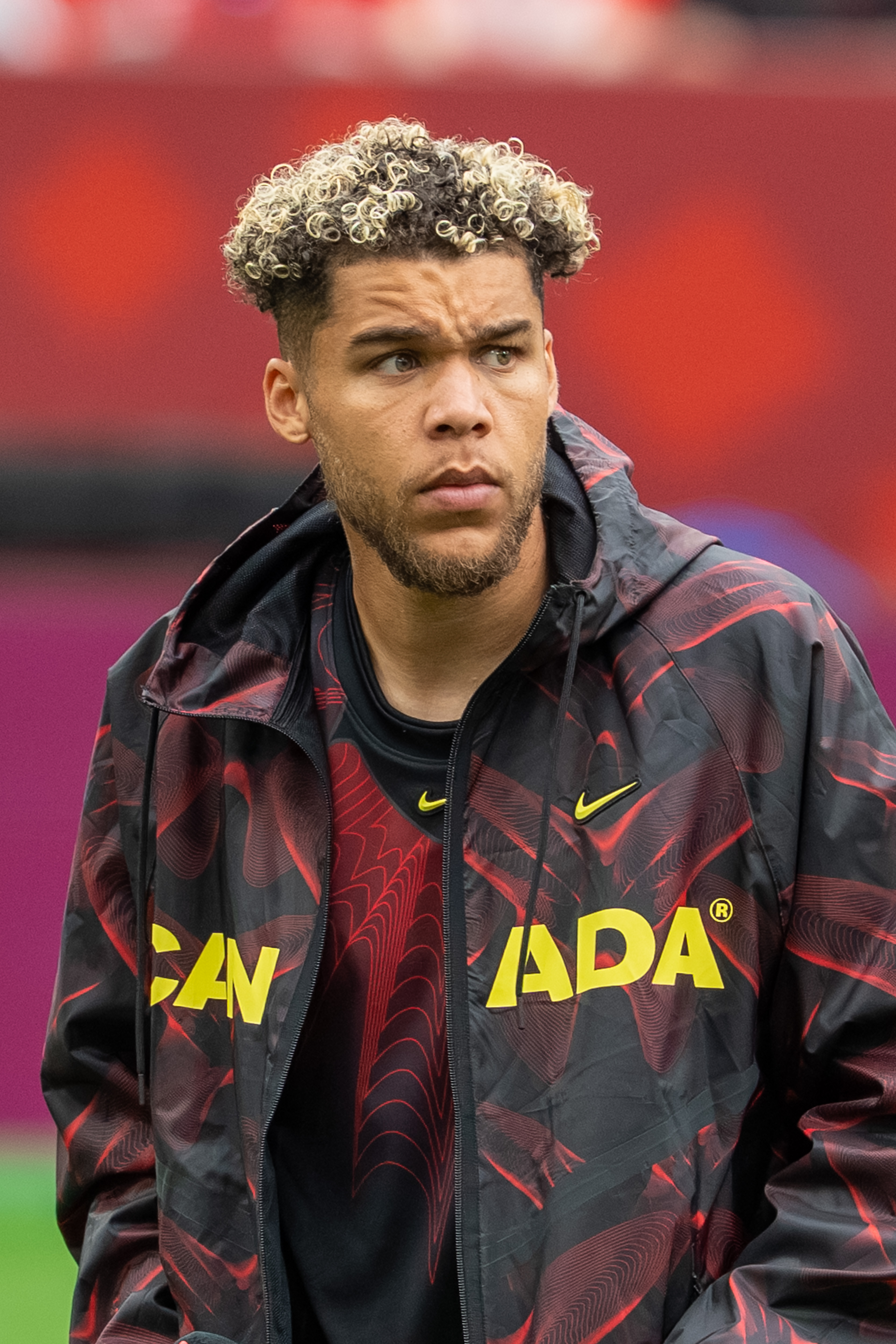
- St. Clair with Canada in 2026

Personal information
- Full name: Dayne Tristan St. Clair
- Date of birth: May 9, 1997 (age 29)
- Place of birth: Pickering, Ontario, Canada
- Height: 1.91 m (6 ft 3 in)
- Position: Goalkeeper

Team information
- Current team: Inter Miami
- Number: 97

Youth career
- North Scarborough SC
- Pickering SC
- Ajax SC
- 2014: Vaughan Azzurri

College career
| Years | Team | Apps | (Gls) |
| 2015–2018 | Maryland Terrapins | 43 | (0) |

Senior career*
| Years | Team | Apps | (Gls) |
| 2014–2015 | Vaughan Azzurri | | |
| 2016–2017 | K–W United | 13 | (0) |
| 2018 | New York Red Bulls U23 | 3 | (0) |
| 2019–2025 | Minnesota United | 135 | (0) |
| 2019 | → Forward Madison (loan) | 5 | (0) |
| 2020 | → San Antonio FC (loan) | 5 | (0) |
| 2026– | Inter Miami | 29 | (0) |

International career^{‡}
| 2021– | Canada | 22 | (0) |
Medal record
Representing Canada
Men's soccer
CONCACAF Nations League
| Runner-up | 2023 |
| Third place | 2025 |
- * Club domestic league appearances and goals as of November 7, 2026 ‡ National team caps and goals as of October 6, 2026

Dayne Tristan St. Clair (born May 9, 1997) is a Canadian professional soccer player who currently plays as a goalkeeper for Major League Soccer club Inter Miami and the Canada national team.

Prior to playing for Inter Miami, St. Clair was the goalkeeper for Minnesota United for seven years. Before playing with Minnesota United, he was a two-year starter for the Maryland Terrapins men's soccer program. With Maryland, he was the starting goalkeeper for their national championship run, where he earned the NCAA Division I Men's Soccer Tournament Most Outstanding Player for the best defensive soccer player in the national tournament.

Prior to playing college soccer for the University of Maryland, St. Clair played youth soccer for the Vaughan Azzurri and helped the Azzurri win a League1 Ontario cup title.

== Early life ==
St. Clair was born in Pickering, Ontario, to a Trinidadian father and a Scottish Canadian mother. He grew up in Scarborough, where a soccer ball was his favourite toy and he would juggle a balloon for long periods when he could not play with a ball indoors. As a child he was often photographed wearing Celtic jerseys, reflecting his mother's Scottish background, and he spent weekends watching his father Fabian play as a goalkeeper in local Sunday leagues before joining other children on the pitch at half-time and after matches.

He began playing soccer at age three with the Epiphany Church Soccer League before joining North Scarborough SC at age four. St. Clair played primarily as a central defender in his early youth career and spent time with Pickering SC, Ajax SC, and the Vaughan Azzurri. He has said that he often volunteered to play in goal when his team's regular goalkeeper was unavailable, preferring to go in net rather than sit on the bench, and that after being selected as a goalkeeper for the provincial team and encouraged by coach Gerald Pennant, who had worked with the Jamaican national team, he committed to the position full-time and began focusing more on his positioning and angles to complement his athleticism.

== College career ==
Entering the 2015 NCAA Division I men's soccer season, St. Clair was redshirted. During his redshirt freshman year in 2016, he served as a backup to Cody Niedermeier and briefly considered transferring after not playing regularly in his first year. Entering the 2017 NCAA Division I men's soccer season, St. Clair became the regular starter for Maryland, making his first college soccer start for the Terrapins on August 25, 2017, in a 4–2 win against Santa Clara. In his final season, he helped Maryland win the 2018 NCAA Division I Men's Soccer Tournament, keeping five consecutive clean sheets in the competition, and was named the defensive Most Outstanding Player of the tournament. St. Clair finished his Maryland career making a total of 43 appearances for the program.

== Club career ==
=== Early career ===
St. Clair played primarily as a central defender through his early teens, but volunteered to fill in as goalkeeper for Pickering Soccer Club whenever the team's regular goalkeeper missed games due to hockey tournaments, later saying "I'd rather go in net than sit on the bench". He initially split time between goalkeeping and playing outfield before moving into goal full-time at age 14. St. Clair played for League1 Ontario club Vaughan Azzurri in 2014 and 2015, helping the club win the inaugural 2014 League1 Ontario Cup, and developed a lasting mentorship with Vaughan Azzurri coach Patrice Gheisar. During the 2016 and 2017 PDL seasons, St. Clair made thirteen appearances with K–W United FC. During the 2018 PDL season, St. Clair made three appearances for the New York Red Bulls under-23 team.

=== Minnesota United ===
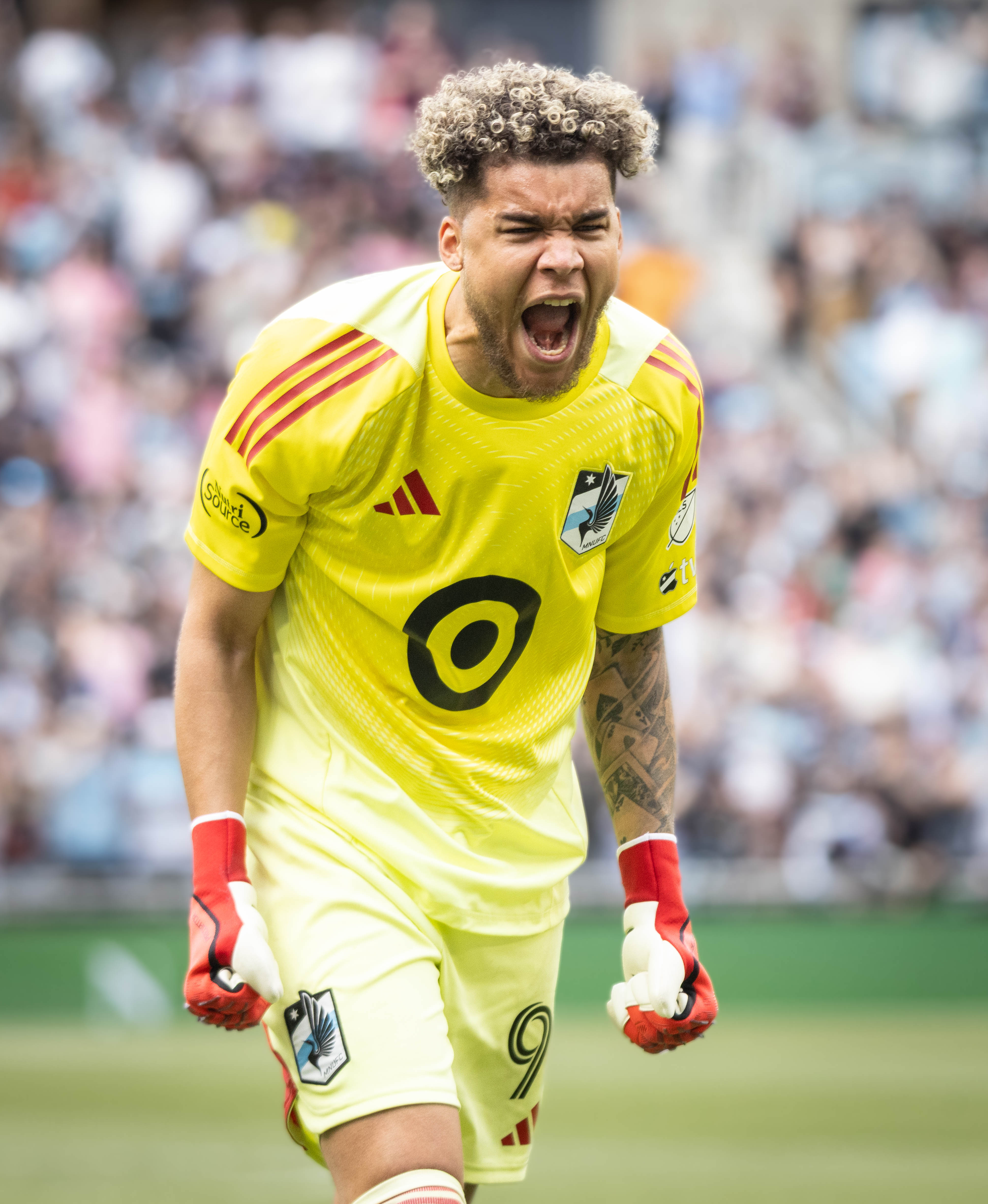
St. Clair with Minnesota United in 2025

On January 4, 2019, ahead of the 2019 MLS SuperDraft, St. Clair signed a Generation Adidas contract with Major League Soccer, forgoing his final season of eligibility. On January 11, 2019, St. Clair was drafted seventh overall in the 2019 MLS SuperDraft by Minnesota United FC, the highest a goalkeeper had been selected since Toronto FC took Alex Bono sixth overall in 2015. St. Clair said of getting drafted, "I wanted to make a statement to the person I am, the player I am. This is my statement." In his rookie season, St. Clair was behind starter Vito Mannone and did not make a first-team appearance. In April 2019, St. Clair was loaned out to Minnesota's USL affiliate club, Forward Madison FC. He made his league debut for the club on April 6, 2019, playing all ninety minutes in a 1–0 defeat to Chattanooga Red Wolves.

In February 2020, it was announced that Minnesota had loaned St. Clair out once again, this time to USL Championship side San Antonio FC. On August 15, 2020, San Antonio announced that St. Clair had been recalled by Minnesota after an injury to Tyler Miller opened a path to his MLS debut, where he played the last 13 games of the regular season and three 2020 MLS Cup Playoff games, conceding just 15 goals and with eight clean sheets. After Minnesota United started the 2021 season 0–4, St. Clair lost his starting spot and did not make another start that year. Upon conclusion of the 2021 season, St. Clair signed a three-year extension with Minnesota United through the end of the 2024 season, with a club option for 2025. Heading into the 2022 season, and with limited playing time, St. Clair requested a trade from Minnesota; he has said he was close to a move before an injury to starter Tyler Miller gave him an opportunity, which he seized with an eight-save performance in a 1–0 win over the New York Red Bulls. St. Clair went on to become Minnesota's starting goalkeeper, making the 2022 MLS All-Star Game, earning a second All-Star selection in 2025, and winning the MLS Goalkeeper of the Year Award in 2025.

=== Inter Miami ===
On January 4, 2026, St. Clair signed with Inter Miami through the 2026 season with a club option for another year.

== International career ==
St. Clair was named to the Canada U-23 provisional roster for the 2020 CONCACAF Men's Olympic Qualifying Championship on February 26, 2020. He accepted an invite for the Canada senior national team camp for January 2021. He made his debut for the senior team on June 5, 2021, playing the whole game in a 7–0 FIFA World Cup qualification victory over Aruba at an empty IMG Academy stadium in Florida amid the COVID-19 pandemic; St. Clair later said that despite barely touching the ball, he felt he had helped Canada move toward qualifying for the World Cup for the first time in 40 years. On July 1 St. Clair was named to the Canada squad for the 2021 CONCACAF Gold Cup. During this period, St. Clair competed with Maxime Crépeau for the backup role behind starter Milan Borjan, with St. Clair later noting he believed Crépeau, who had been with the program since 2016, initially expected to be the natural successor.

In November 2022 St. Clair was named to Canada's squad for the 2022 FIFA World Cup, after Crépeau suffered a broken leg and was sent off during LAFC's MLS Cup Final loss to the Philadelphia Union just weeks before the tournament, ending Crépeau's own World Cup hopes; St. Clair has said he felt for Crépeau, who "worked so hard" and "deserved to be there". St. Clair served as backup to Borjan for all three of Canada's matches at the tournament.

In June 2023, St. Clair was called up to the 23-man squad contesting the 2023 CONCACAF Nations League Finals. On June 19 he was named to the 23-man squad for the 2023 CONCACAF Gold Cup. Following a quarter-final exit to Jamaica at the 2023 CONCACAF Nations League in November 2023, Borjan and several other veteran players were phased out of the national team.

Following the hiring of Jesse Marsch as Canada's head coach on May 23, 2024, St. Clair started Marsch's first match in charge against the Netherlands in Rotterdam on June 6, 2024, a match in which Canada conceded four goals within a 15-minute span in the second half. Crépeau started Canada's following match, a scoreless draw against France, and went on to start for Canada at the 2024 Copa América; St. Clair did not see action at the tournament until starting the third-place match against Uruguay, a game Canada lost on penalties, though St. Clair was named to Canada's squad for the tournament. Since the 2024 Copa América, St. Clair has started 12 of Canada's 19 matches through mid-2026, recording seven clean sheets, including victories over Mexico and Wales.

St. Clair started for Canada at the 2025 CONCACAF Gold Cup, including the team's quarter-final loss to Guatemala on penalties following a 1–0 lead conceded down to ten men. Following criticism after the loss, Marsch defended St. Clair at a September 2025 press conference ahead of a friendly against Wales, saying he had "been outstanding for the national team" since taking charge; St. Clair started the subsequent 1–0 win over Wales in Swansea. St. Clair and Crépeau have continued to compete for the Canada starting goalkeeper role heading into 2026, with Marsch describing the decision as one of the most difficult he faces ahead of the tournament.

On May 28, 2026, St. Clair was selected for Canada's squad for the 2026 FIFA World Cup.

== Career statistics ==
=== Club ===
As of match played November 21, 2026

Appearances and goals by club, season and competition
| Club | Season | League | | | Playoffs | | National cup | | Continental | | Other | | Total | |
| Club | Season | Division | Apps | Goals | Apps | Goals | Apps | Goals | Apps | Goals | Apps | Goals | Apps | Goals |
|---|---|---|---|---|---|---|---|---|---|---|---|---|---|---|
| K–W United | 2016 | PDL | 6 | 0 | 0 | 0 | — | | — | | — | | 6 | 0 |
| K–W United | 2017 | PDL | 7 | 0 | 0 | 0 | — | | — | | — | | 7 | 0 |
| K–W United | Total | | 13 | 0 | 0 | 0 | 0 | 0 | 0 | 0 | 0 | 0 | 13 | 0 |
| New York Red Bulls U-23 | 2018 | PDL | 3 | 0 | 0 | 0 | — | | — | | — | | 3 | 0 |
| Minnesota United | 2020 | MLS | 13 | 0 | 3 | 0 | — | | — | | 0 | 0 | 16 | 0 |
| Minnesota United | 2021 | MLS | 4 | 0 | 1 | 0 | — | | — | | — | | 5 | 0 |
| Minnesota United | 2022 | MLS | 32 | 0 | 1 | 0 | 0 | 0 | — | | — | | 33 | 0 |
| Minnesota United | 2023 | MLS | 30 | 0 | 0 | 0 | 0 | 0 | — | | 5 (Note: Appearances in Leagues Cup) | 0 | 35 | 0 |
| Minnesota United | 2024 | MLS | 26 | 0 | 3 | 0 | — | | — | | 2 | 0 | 31 | 0 |
| Minnesota United | 2025 | MLS | 30 | 0 | 4 | 0 | 2 | 0 | 0 | 0 | 3 | 0 | 39 | 0 |
| Minnesota United | Total | | 135 | 0 | 12 | 0 | 2 | 0 | 0 | 0 | 10 | 0 | 159 | 0 |
| Forward Madison (loan) | 2019 | USL League One | 5 | 0 | 0 | 0 | 0 | 0 | — | | — | | 5 | 0 |
| San Antonio (loan) | 2020 | USL Championship | 5 | 0 | 0 | 0 | — | | — | | — | | 5 | 0 |
| Inter Miami | 2026 | MLS | 29 | 0 | 1 | 0 | — | | 2 (Note: Appearances in CONCACAF Champions Cup) | 0 | 1 (Note: Appearance in Campeones Cup) | 0 | 33 | 0 |
| Career total | | | 190 | 0 | 13 | 0 | 2 | 0 | 2 | 0 | 11 | 0 | 218 | 0 |

=== International ===
As of match played October 6, 2026

Appearances and goals by national team and year
| National team | Year | Apps | Goals |
|---|---|---|---|
| Canada | 2021 | 1 | 0 |
| Canada | 2022 | 1 | 0 |
| Canada | 2023 | 2 | 0 |
| Canada | 2024 | 5 | 0 |
| Canada | 2025 | 9 | 0 |
| Canada | 2026 | 4 | 0 |
| Total | | 22 | 0 |

== Honours ==
Vaughan Azzurri

- League1 Ontario Cup: 2014

Maryland Terrapins

- NCAA Division I men's soccer tournament: 2018

Inter Miami

- Campeones Cup: 2026

Individual

- NCAA Tournament Defensive MVP: 2018
- MLS All-Star: 2022, 2025
- MLS All-Star Game MVP: 2022
- MLS Best XI: 2025
- MLS Goalkeeper of the Year: 2025
