= 2022 MLS Cup playoffs =

2022 edition of the MLS Cup playoffs tournament

Tournament details
- Country: United States; Canada
- Dates: October 15 – November 5
- Teams: 14

Final positions
- Champions: Los Angeles FC (1st title)
- Runners-up: Philadelphia Union
- Semifinalists: Austin FC; New York City FC

Tournament statistics
- Matches played: 13
- Goals scored: 41 (3.15 per match)
- Attendance: 263,192 (20,246 per match)
- Top goal scorer(s): (Argentina) Sebastián Driussi (Argentina) Maxi Moralez (3 goals each)

The 2022 MLS Cup playoffs (branded as the Audi 2022 MLS Cup Playoffs for sponsorship reasons) was the 27th edition of the MLS Cup playoffs, the post-season championship of Major League Soccer (MLS), the top soccer league in the United States and Canada. The tournament culminated the 2022 MLS regular season. The tournament began on October 15 and concluded with MLS Cup 2022 on November 5, 16 days before the start of the 2022 FIFA World Cup in Qatar.

New York City FC entered the playoffs as the defending MLS champions, but were eliminated in the conference finals by the Philadelphia Union. Los Angeles FC entered as Supporters' Shield winners and won their first MLS Cup, defeating the Philadelphia Union in a penalty shoot-out. The 2022 playoffs marked the first since 2008 where no teams from the Pacific Northwest region (including 2021 finalist Portland Timbers) qualified; Seattle Sounders FC failed to qualify for the first time in their MLS history, snapping a league-record thirteen-year playoff streak. Austin FC and FC Cincinnati reached the MLS Cup playoffs for the first time in 2022.

== Qualified teams ==
Eastern Conference

- CF Montréal
- FC Cincinnati
- Inter Miami CF
- New York City FC
- New York Red Bulls
- Orlando City SC
- Philadelphia Union

Western Conference

- Austin FC
- FC Dallas
- Los Angeles FC
- LA Galaxy
- Nashville SC
- Minnesota United FC
- Real Salt Lake

== Conference standings ==
The top seven teams in the Eastern and Western Conference qualified for the MLS Cup playoffs, with the conference champions receiving first round byes. A green background denotes teams that qualified for the 2023 CONCACAF Champions League.

Eastern Conference

Pos	Team	Pld	Pts
1	Philadelphia Union	34	67
2	CF Montréal	34	65
3	New York City FC	34	55
4	New York Red Bulls	34	53
5	FC Cincinnati	34	49
6	Inter Miami CF	34	48
7	Orlando City SC	34	48

Source: MLS

Western Conference

Pos	Team	Pld	Pts
1	Los Angeles FC	34	67
2	Austin FC	34	56
3	FC Dallas	34	53
4	LA Galaxy	34	50
5	Nashville SC	34	50
6	Minnesota United FC	34	48
7	Real Salt Lake	34	47

Source: MLS

== Bracket ==
First round October 15–17	Conference semifinals October 20–23
E1	Philadelphia Union	1
E5	FC Cincinnati	0
E4	New York Red Bulls	1
E5	FC Cincinnati	2
Eastern Conference
E3	New York City FC	3
E6	Inter Miami CF	0
E3	New York City FC	3
E2	CF Montréal	1
E2	CF Montréal	2
E7	Orlando City SC	0
W1	Los Angeles FC	3
W4	LA Galaxy	2
W4	LA Galaxy	1
W5	Nashville SC	0
Western Conference
W3	FC Dallas (p)	1 (5)
W6	Minnesota United FC	1 (4)
W3	FC Dallas	1
W2	Austin FC	2
W2	Austin FC (p)	2 (3)
W7	Real Salt Lake	2 (1)

Conference finals October 30
E1	Philadelphia Union	3
E3	New York City FC	1
W1	Los Angeles FC	3
W2	Austin FC	0

MLS Cup; November 5
E1	Philadelphia Union	3 (0)
W1	Los Angeles FC (p)	3 (3)

Note: The higher seeded teams hosted matches, with the MLS Cup host determined by overall points.

== First round ==
The second through fourth-seeded teams in each conference hosted the first-round matches. The team with the best record in each conference received a bye to the conference semifinals.

=== Eastern Conference ===
October 15
12:00 pm EDT

New York Red Bulls	1–2	FC Cincinnati
Morgan 48'	Report	Acosta 74' (pen.); Vázquez 86'

Red Bull Arena, Harrison, New Jersey
Attendance: 17,113
Referee: Alex Chilowicz

October 16
8:00 pm EDT

CF Montréal	2–0	Orlando City SC
Koné 68'; Mihailovic 90+9' (pen.)	Report

Saputo Stadium, Montreal, Quebec
Attendance: 19,619
Referee: Ismail Elfath

October 17
7:00 pm EDT

New York City FC	3–0	Inter Miami CF
Pereira 63'; Moralez 69'; Héber 90+2'	Report

Citi Field, New York City, New York
Attendance: 18,066
Referee: Rubiel Vazquez

=== Western Conference ===
October 15
12:00 pm PDT

LA Galaxy	1–0	Nashville SC
Araujo 60'	Report

Dignity Health Sports Park, Carson, California
Attendance: 22,280
Referee: Armando Villarreal

October 16
2:00 pm CDT

Austin FC	2–2 (a.e.t.)	Real Salt Lake
Driussi 31', 90+4' (pen.)	Report	Córdova 3', 15' (pen.)
Penalties
Driussi (penalty scored); Fagúndez (penalty scored); Rigoni (penalty scored)	3–1	(penalty scored) Silva; (penalty missed) Brody; (penalty missed) Ojeda; (penalty missed) Schmitt

Q2 Stadium, Austin, Texas
Attendance: 20,738
Referee: Victor Rivas

October 17
8:30 pm CDT

FC Dallas	1–1 (a.e.t.)	Minnesota United FC
Quignon 64'	Report	Reynoso 53'
Penalties
Jara (penalty scored); Lletget (penalty scored); Hedges (penalty scored); Ferreira (penalty scored); Velasco (penalty scored)	5–4	(penalty scored) Reynoso; (penalty missed) Trapp; (penalty scored) Arriaga; (penalty scored) Benítez; (penalty scored) García

Toyota Stadium, Frisco, Texas
Attendance: 19,096
Referee: Ted Unkel

== Conference semifinals ==
The higher-seeded teams in each match-up as determined by regular season ranking hosted the matches.

=== Eastern Conference ===
October 20
8:00 pm EDT

Philadelphia Union	1–0	FC Cincinnati
Flach 59'	Report

Subaru Park, Chester, Pennsylvania
Attendance: 19,289
Referee: Tim Ford

October 23
1:00 pm EDT

CF Montréal	1–3	New York City FC
Mihailovic 85'	Report	Moralez 6'; Héber 45+3'; Talles Magno 61' (pen.)

Saputo Stadium, Montreal, Quebec
Attendance: 19,619
Referee: Drew Fischer

=== Western Conference ===
October 20
7:00 pm PDT

Los Angeles FC	3–2	LA Galaxy
Bouanga 23', 80'; Arango 90+3'	Report	Grandsir 44'; Joveljić 85'

Banc of California Stadium, Los Angeles, California
Attendance: 22,305
Referee: Allen Chapman

October 23
7:00 pm CDT

Austin FC	2–1	FC Dallas
Djitté 26'; Driussi 29'	Report	Velasco 65'

Q2 Stadium, Austin, Texas
Attendance: 20,738
Referee: Joe Dickerson

== Conference finals ==
The higher-seeded teams in each conference as determined by regular season ranking hosted the matches.

=== Eastern Conference ===
October 30
8:00 pm EDT

Philadelphia Union	3–1	New York City FC
Carranza 65'; Gazdag 67'; Burke 76'	Report	Moralez 57'

Subaru Park, Chester, Pennsylvania
Attendance: 19,770
Referee: Allen Chapman

=== Western Conference ===
October 30
12:00 pm PDT

Los Angeles FC	3–0	Austin FC
Arango 29'; Urruti 62' (o.g.); Opoku 81'	Report

Banc of California Stadium, Los Angeles, California
Attendance: 22,175
Referee: Armando Villarreal

== MLS Cup 2022 ==
The highest-ranked team remaining in the overall table (Los Angeles FC) hosted the match.

November 5, 2022
1:00 p.m. PDT

Los Angeles FC	3–3 (a.e.t.)	Philadelphia Union
Acosta 28'; Murillo 83'; Bale 120+8'	Report	Gazdag 59'; Elliott 85', 120+4'
Penalties
Tello (penalty missed); Bouanga (penalty scored); Hollingshead (penalty scored); Ilie (penalty scored)	3–0	(penalty missed) Gazdag; (penalty missed) Martínez; (penalty missed) Wagner

Banc of California Stadium, Los Angeles, California
Attendance: 22,384
Referee: Ismail Elfath

== Top goalscorers ==
Rank	Player	Club	Goals
1	(Argentina) Sebastián Driussi	Austin FC	3
1	(Argentina) Maxi Moralez	New York City FC	3
3	(Colombia) Cristian Arango	Los Angeles FC	2
3	(Gabon) Denis Bouanga	Los Angeles FC	2
3	(Venezuela) Sergio Córdova	Real Salt Lake	2
3	(England) Jack Elliott	Philadelphia Union	2
3	(Hungary) Dániel Gazdag	Philadelphia Union	2
3	(Brazil) Héber	New York City FC	2
3	(United States) Djordje Mihailovic	CF Montréal	2
