= Bell Bank =

Privately owned bank

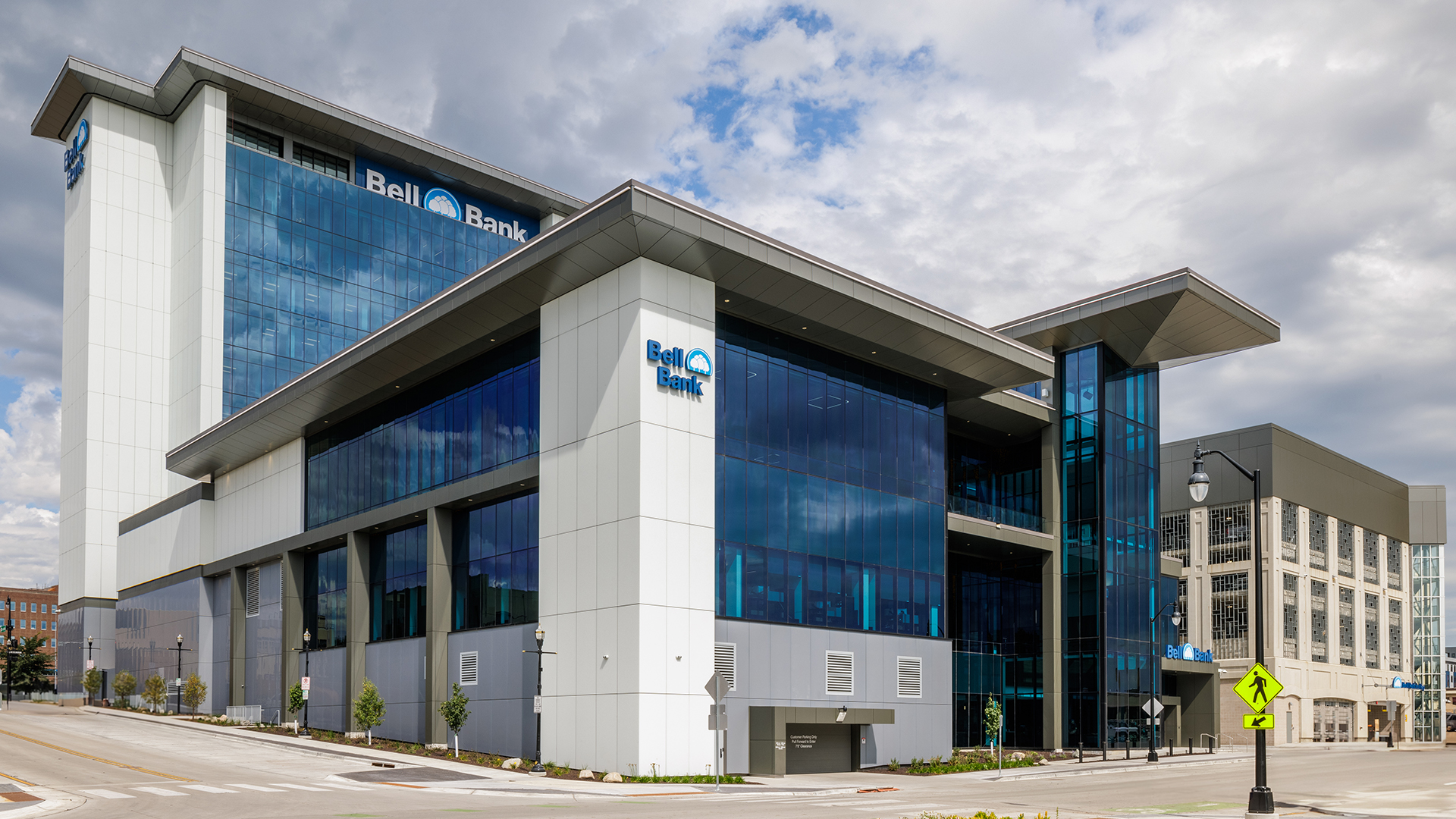
- Bell Bank headquarters in Fargo, North Dakota
- Type: Private
- Industry: Banking, Financial services, Mortgage, Insurance
- Founded: 1966; 60 years ago
- Headquarters: Fargo, North Dakota, U.S.
- Key people: Richard Solberg (Board Chairman); Michael Solberg (President & CEO)
- Number of employees: 2,000
- Website: bell.bank

Bell Bank is a privately owned bank headquartered in Fargo, North Dakota, with assets of $14 billion. Bell Bank, which employs more than 1,900 people, has 27 full-service banking locations in North Dakota, Minnesota and Arizona, and mortgage locations in Arizona, Colorado, Florida, Kansas, Illinois, Minnesota, Missouri, New Mexico, North Dakota, Tennessee and Wisconsin. State Bankshares is Bell Bank's parent company.

== History ==
Bell Bank was founded as State Bank of Fargo in 1966 with a single location in the Northport Shopping Center in Fargo. Thomas "Buck" Snortland was one of the company's founders.

In 2003, the bank acquired Northern Capital Trust, a trust company and flex spending adjudication business. Richard Solberg, who was then the bank's president and CEO, had served on the board of directors for Northern Capital Trust since the company was established—16 years before the merger.

Not long after the merger, Bell created a spin-off company called Discovery Benefits, which administers flexible benefits, COBRA and health savings accounts. Bell also started HealthcareBank, one of the largest health care savings account banks.

In 2019, State Bankshares announced plans to sell Discovery Benefits for $425 million to Wex Inc., a South Portland, Maine-based payment processing and business solutions provider. In 2021, Bell and WEX agreed to WEX's acquisition of certain HSA assets of HealthcareBank.

In 2011, the company acquired Minneapolis-based Bell Mortgage, expanding its reach into the Twin Cities and Phoenix, Ariz. The company changed its name from State Bank & Trust to Bell State Bank & Trust in 2012 and to Bell Bank in Aug., 2016. In 2013, Bell acquired Minneapolis-based The Business Bank and its Prime Mortgage Division. Bell Bank Mortgage expanded its offices into Wisconsin and New Mexico in 2018, Florida, Missouri and Tennessee in 2019, and Kansas in 2020.

Bell launched an equipment finance division in Minneapolis in 2018, to serve the manufacturing, transportation, construction and agriculture industries.

In 2019, Bell signed a purchase agreement to buy Warner and Company Insurance in Fargo, Schiller Insurance in Detroit Lakes, Minnesota, and Thompson-Schaefer Insurance Agency in Grand Forks, North Dakota, and rebranded them as Bell Insurance.

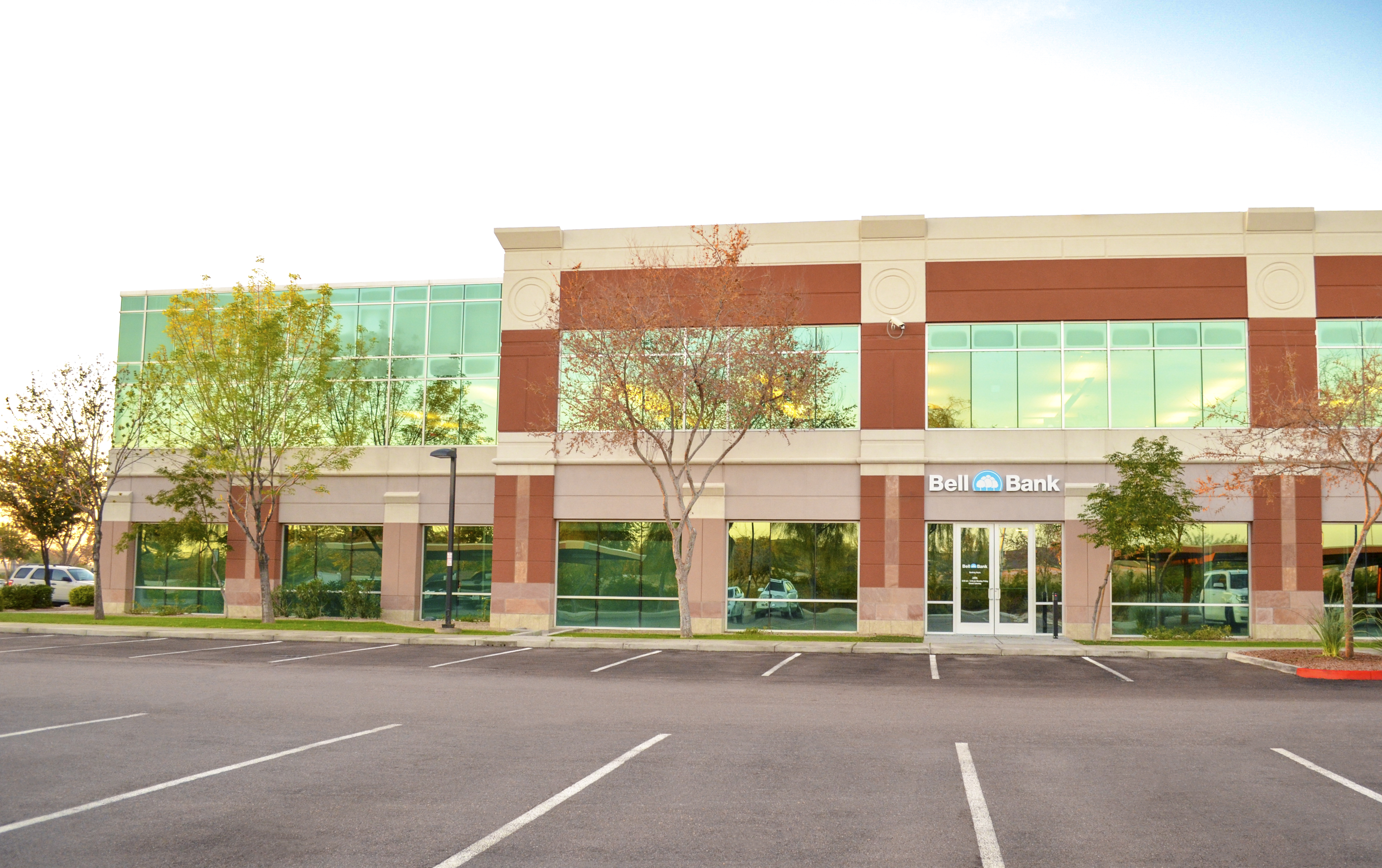
Bell Bank opened its Chandler, Ariz., branch in January, 2019.

Bell opened its first full-service bank branch Chandler, Arizonain 2019, and its second in Phoenix – Biltmore in 2020.

The same year, Bell expanded into Forest Lake, Minn., and Duluth, Minn., renovating and occupying the downtown Temple Opera Building.

In 2021, Bell opened a branch in downtown Minneapolis' City Center and announced its entrance into the Denver market. Bell also purchased a 12-story building at 520 Main Ave. in downtown Fargo.

Bell finalized its building lease for a new mortgage servicing center in Owensboro, Kentucky, in 2022. Bell also launched Bell Business Credit, a specialty lending team providing asset-based lending and factoring services for working capital intensive companies.

In 2024, Bell opened Bell Tower, its new, 190,000-square-foot corporate headquarters in downtown Fargo.

The company plans to remain privately owned.

== Leadership ==
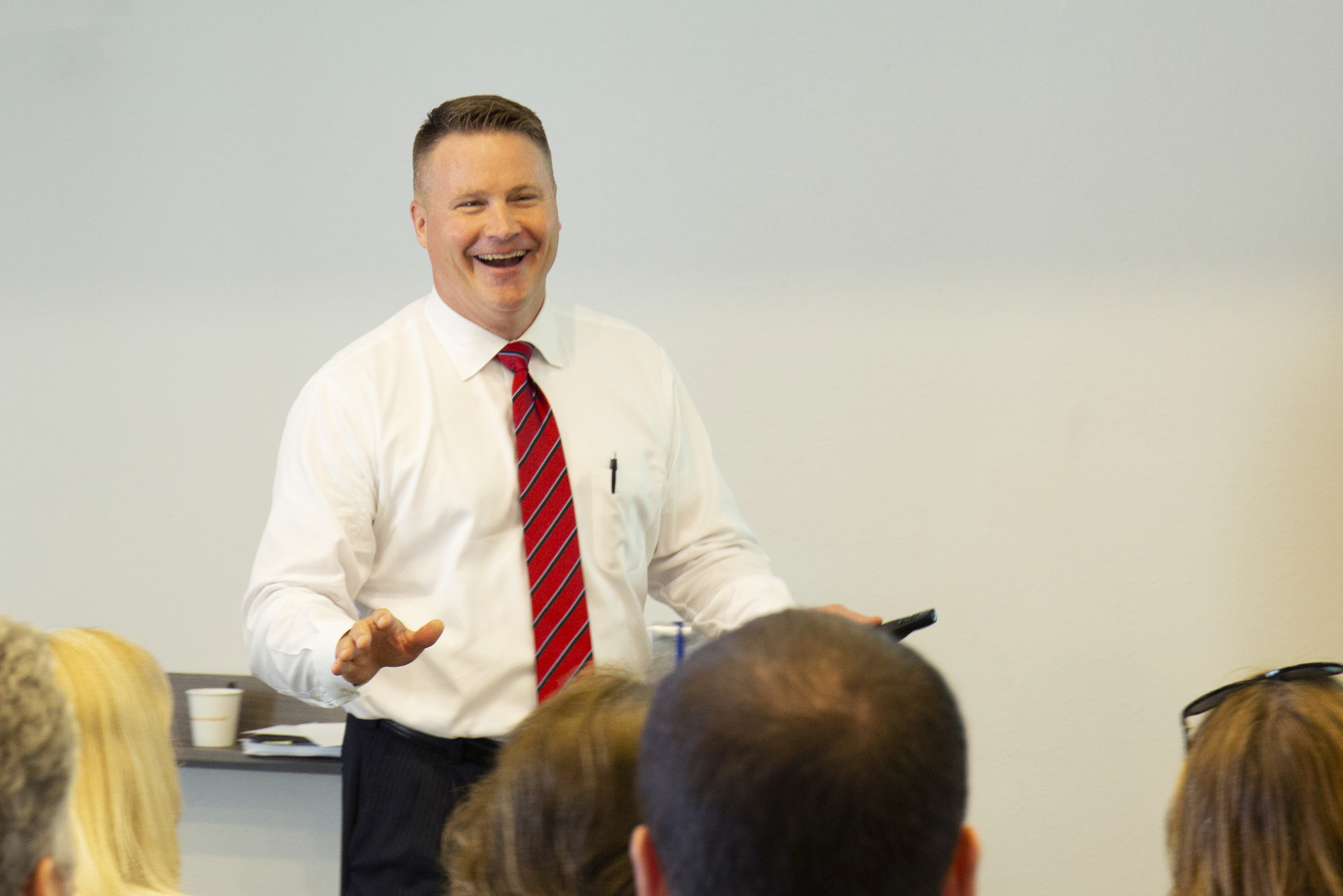
Bell Bank President and CEO Michael Solberg speaks to employees.

In 2014, Michael Solberg was named CEO of Bell Bank. Following his hire in 1998, Solberg began serving as chief operating officer in 2004, then president in 2009. Solberg succeeded his father, Richard Solberg, who had been CEO since 1982.

Richard Solberg is the board chairman and a company shareholder. The bank is owned by about 70 shareholders, with a majority stake held by the families of Richard Solberg, Michael Solberg, Julie Snortland and Laura Snortland Fairfield. Other major shareholders have included Thomas "Buck" Snortland and his son, Thomas "Mickey" Snortland, both farmers from Sharon, North Dakota.

Thomas "Mickey" Snortland, who was also a longtime director of the bank, died in 2013 of an apparent heart attack.

Before working for what was then State Bank of Fargo, Richard Solberg was president of Citizens State Bank in Finley, where he grew up. He also graduated from Concordia College. Under Richard Solberg's leadership, the bank grew from a single location with $28 million in assets to 20 branches in North Dakota and Minnesota with more than $3 billion in assets. In 2022, Richard Solberg received the Legacy Leader Award from the Fargo Moorhead West Fargo Chamber of Commerce.

== Company culture ==
Several media outlets, including USA Today, People magazine and the BBC have written stories about Bell Bank's culture. Bell's mission statement is Happy Employees! Happy Customers! Michael Solberg says the bank's growth and profits are due to the way the company treats its employees. In 2016, Bell announced it would make an employee stock ownership plan (ESOP) part of employees' retirement benefits. A portion of each employee's retirement funds will be invested in State Bankshares stock.

== Sponsorships and endorsements ==
Bell has formed partnerships with athletes and other celebrities with North Dakota and Minnesota ties. Some of them work with Bell on charitable causes. They include:

- Larry Fitzgerald Jr., philanthropist and former NFL player
- Josh Duhamel, American actor and former fashion model
- Ben Johnson (basketball), college basketball coach
- Marney Gellner, Minnesota sports broadcaster
- Matt Cullen, retired American NHL player
- Ben Leber, retired Minnesota Vikings linebacker and sports radio personality
- Gavin Kaysen, James Beard Award-winning chef, who owns three Minneapolis restaurants
- Mark Tarbell, chef, restaurateur, wine columnist, Iron Chef America winner and two-time inductee into the Arizona Hall of Culinary Fame
- Lindsay Whalen, University of Minnesota women's basketball coach and former Minnesota Lynx women's basketball player
- Tyus Jones, American professional basketball player
- Chris Hawkey, country music artist and sports radio personality
- Amy Olson, American professional golfer
- Tom Hoge, American professional golfer
- Branden Scheel, American triathlete
- Minnesota United FC, an American professional soccer club based in the Minneapolis–Saint Paul area
- Arizona Cardinals, an American professional football team based in the Phoenix area
- Phoenix Suns and Phoenix Mercury, American professional men’s and women’s basketball teams based in the Phoenix area
