= Justin McMaster =

Professional footballer (born 1999)

Personal information
- Full name: Justin Cameron McMaster
- Date of birth: June 30, 1999 (age 27)
- Place of birth: Atlanta, Georgia, United States
- Height: 5 ft 10 in (1.78 m)
- Position: Winger

Youth career
- Swallowfield FC
- Cavalier
- 2014–2017: Philadelphia Union

College career
Years	Team	Apps	(Gls)
2017–2020	Wake Forest Demon Deacons	57	(12)

Senior career*
Years	Team	Apps	(Gls)
2016–2017	Bethlehem Steel	10	(0)
2021–2022	Minnesota United	7	(0)
2022	Minnesota United 2	17	(5)

International career
2013	Jamaica U15		
2015	Jamaica U17		
2022–	Jamaica	1	(1)
- * Club domestic league appearances and goals as of 18 September 2022

Justin Cameron McMaster (born June 30, 1999) is a professional footballer who plays as a winger. Born in the United States, he plays for the Jamaica national team.

== Club career ==
He made his professional debut for Bethlehem Steel FC during the 2016 USL season against Charlotte Independence in June 2016.

McMaster was drafted 17th overall by Minnesota United in the 2021 MLS SuperDraft. He signed with the club on 3 April 2021. Following the 2022 season, his contract option was declined by Minnesota.

== International career ==
=== Youth ===
McMaster represented Jamaica during the 2013 CONCACAF Under-15 Championship and the 2015 CONCACAF U-17 Championship qualifying tournament. He scored four goals against U.S. Virgin Islands in a 19–0 victory.

=== Senior ===
In November 2022, McMaster received a call-up to the Jamaican senior team for a friendly against Cameroon. McMaster scored his first senior international goal against Cameroon.

== International goals ==
No.	Date	Venue	Opponent	Score	Result	Competition
1.	9 November 2022	Olembe Stadium, Yaoundé, Cameroon	Cameroon	1–0	1–1	Friendly

== Career statistics ==
=== College ===
School	Season	Division	Apps	Goals
Wake Forest Demon Deacons	2017	Div. I	20	2
Wake Forest Demon Deacons	2018	Div. I	18	6
Wake Forest Demon Deacons	2019	Div. I	19	4
Wake Forest Demon Deacons	2020	Div. I	6	1
Career total			?	?

=== Club ===
As of match played 28 November 2021

Club	Season	League			Cup		Playoffs		Other		Total	
Club	Season	Division	Apps	Goals	Apps	Goals	Apps	Goals	Apps	Goals	Apps	Goals
Bethlehem Steel FC	2016	USL	9	0	—		—		—		9	0
Bethlehem Steel FC	2017	USL	1	0	—		—		—		1	0
Bethlehem Steel FC	Total		10	0	0	0	0	0	0	0	10	0
Minnesota United FC	2021	MLS	7	0	—		—		—		7	0
Career totals			17	0	0	0	0	0	0	0	17	0
