= Emanuel Reynoso (footballer, born 1995) =

Argentine footballer

Personal information
- Date of birth: 16 November 1995 (age 30)
- Place of birth: Córdoba, Argentina
- Height: 1.77 m (5 ft 10 in)
- Positions: Attacking midfielder; winger

Team information
- Current team: Deportivo Cali (on loan from Talleres)
- Number: 10

Senior career*
Years	Team	Apps	(Gls)
2014–2018	Talleres de Córdoba	52	(2)
2018–2020	Boca Juniors	45	(2)
2020–2024	Minnesota United	90	(22)
2024–2025	Tijuana	19	(4)
2025–	Talleres de Córdoba	21	(0)
2026–	→ Deportivo Cali (loan)	8	(0)
- * Club domestic league appearances and goals as of 18:38, 17 March 2026 (UTC)

Emanuel Reynoso (born 16 November 1995), sometimes known as Bebelo, is an Argentine professional footballer who plays as an attacking midfielder or winger for Deportivo Cali, on loan from Talleres de Córdoba.

== Career ==
=== Talleres ===
Reynoso had his debut in 2014, playing for Talleres when the team was competing in the third division. Talleres won the tournament in 2015 and got promoted to B Nacional, the Second Argentine Division. Reynoso had great importance on Talleres winning the 2016 Primera B Nacional, when the team finally was promoted to Argentine First Division, after 12 years. He was one of the most important players on that team and then had a great performance in 2017 in the First Division, scoring relevant goals against Lanús and Boca Juniors.

=== Boca Juniors ===
In February 2018, Reynoso signed with Boca Juniors. He reached the semifinals with Boca in 2019 Copa Libertadores.

=== Minnesota United ===
On 1 September 2020, Reynoso signed with Minnesota United FC. He made his Minnesota United debut on 2 September 2020 against Houston Dynamo. He scored his first goal for the club on 8 November 2020 against FC Dallas. With an assist in the 67th minute of the Western Conference Finals of the 2020 MLS Cup Playoffs against Seattle Sounders FC, Reynoso set a single season MLS record with his seventh assist of the playoffs. He was also the first MLS player in league history to record multiple three-assist playoff games.

Reynoso signed a three-year contract extension with Minnesota United FC in September 2022. After being cleared to return from Argentina despite a potential criminal trial, he failed to report to preseason training with the team in January 2023 and was suspended without pay by the league on 10 February 2023. Reynoso's absence was described as being related to "personal matters" by manager Adrian Heath, who was in contact with his family in Argentina; he later explained it was related to "a problem with his daughter" and unrelated to legal issues. Reynoso returned to training in Minnesota on 6 May, having missed 10 matches of the MLS regular season, and his suspension was lifted on 17 May. He played in 18 matches and scored 6 goals during the regular season.

He missed the first week of training during the 2024 preseason but joined Minnesota United FC for friendlies and scrimmages in Tucson, Arizona. Reynoso injured his left knee during preseason and was unable to play for the first three matches of the regular season, but appeared as a substitute for 31 minutes against Los Angeles FC on 16 March. He returned to Argentina during a scheduled bye during an international break to obtain his green card for permanent residency in the United States, but failed to attend his appointment. Reynoso remained in Argentina for seven weeks and did not return to Minnesota United FC until early May; he did not return to training with the first team and the club publicly expressed their desire to transfer him.

=== Tijuana ===
On 30 May 2024, Reynoso joined Liga MX club Tijuana.

=== Return to Talleres ===
On 7 February 2025, Reynoso returned to Talleres de Córdoba.

== Personal life ==
In March 2014, Reynoso was shot in the left leg.

He was arrested on 7 December 2021, for allegedly hitting a teenager in Argentina. On 21 May 2024, Argentine news outlet El Doce published a video purporting to show Reynoso showing off a bag of money while standing next to another man armed with a handgun who also shows off a bag of money. The video was reportedly recorded during Reynoso's visit to Córdoba.

== Career statistics ==
=== Club ===
As of match played 16 March 2024

Appearances and goals by club, season and competition
Club	Season	League			National cup		League cup		Continental		Other		Total	
Club	Season	Division	Apps	Goals	Apps	Goals	Apps	Goals	Apps	Goals	Apps	Goals	Apps	Goals
Talleres de Córdoba	2014–15	Torneo Federal A	1	0	1	0	—		—		—		2	0
Talleres de Córdoba	2015	Torneo Federal A	1	0	—		—		—		—		1	0
Talleres de Córdoba	2016	Primera B Nacional	16	0	3	1	—		—		—		19	1
Talleres de Córdoba	2016–17	Argentine Primera División	25	2	2	1	—		—		—		27	3
Talleres de Córdoba	2017–18	Argentine Primera División	9	0	—		—		—		—		9	0
Talleres de Córdoba	Total		52	2	6	2	—		—		—		58	4
Boca Juniors	2017–18	Argentine Primera División	11	0	—		—		5 (Note: Appearances in Copa Libertadores)	0	—		16	0
Boca Juniors	2018–19	Argentine Primera División	16	1	1	0	2	0	9	2	1 (Note: Appearance in Supercopa Argentina)	0	29	3
Boca Juniors	2019–20	Argentine Primera División	18	1	—		1	0	2	1	—		21	2
Boca Juniors	Total		45	2	1	0	3	0	16	3	1	0	66	5
Minnesota United FC	2020	MLS	13	1	—		—		—		3 (Note: Appearances in MLS Cup Playoffs)	1	16	2
Minnesota United FC	2021	MLS	29	5	—		—		—		1	0	30	5
Minnesota United FC	2022	MLS	29	10	1	1	—		—		1	1	31	12
Minnesota United FC	2023	MLS	18	6	—		—		—		5 (Note: Appearances in Leagues Cup)	2	23	8
Minnesota United FC	2024	MLS	1	0	—		—		—		—		1	0
Minnesota United FC	Total		90	22	1	1	—		—		10	4	101	27
Career total			187	26	8	3	3	0	16	3	11	4	225	36

== Honours ==
Boca Juniors

- Primera División: 2017–18, 2019–20
- Supercopa Argentina: 2018

Individual

- MLS All-Star: 2022
