= Robin Lod =

Finnish footballer (born 1993)

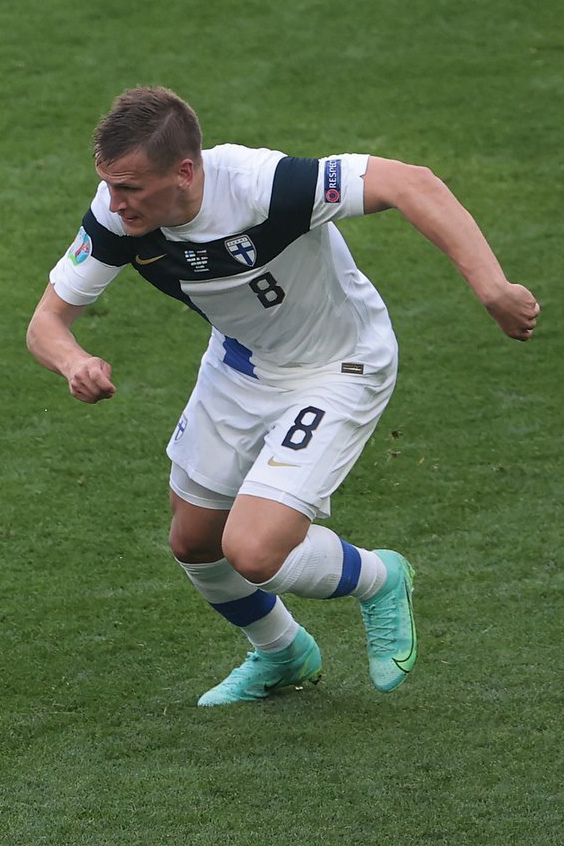
- Lod playing for Finland

Personal information
- Full name: Robin Lod
- Date of birth: 17 April 1993 (age 33)
- Place of birth: Helsinki, Finland
- Height: 1.80 m (5 ft 11 in)
- Positions: Attacking midfielder; winger

Team information
- Current team: Chicago Fire
- Number: 17

Youth career
- 1998–2006: Suurmetsän Urheilijat
- 2006–2011: HJK

Senior career*
Years	Team	Apps	(Gls)
2011–2012	Klubi 04	34	(16)
2011–2015	HJK	75	(15)
2012	→ VPS (loan)	11	(2)
2015–2018	Panathinaikos	75	(12)
2018–2019	Sporting Gijón	24	(4)
2019–2025	Minnesota United	141	(31)
2026–	Chicago Fire	24	(4)

International career^{‡}
2011	Finland U18	16	(4)
2012–2014	Finland U21	14	(1)
2015–	Finland	85	(6)
- * Club domestic league appearances and goals as of October 12, 2026 ‡ National team caps and goals as of 26 September 2026

Robin Lod (Swedish pronunciation: [lu:d]; born 17 April 1993) is a Finnish professional footballer who plays as a attacking midfielder or winger for Major League Soccer club Chicago Fire and the Finland national team.

Lod began his senior club career playing for Klubi 04, before making his league debut for HJK at age 18 in 2011. After winning his first trophy, the Veikkausliiga, during his second season on league level, he helped HJK win three successive Veikkausliiga titles, Cup and League Cup. Lod made his international debut for Finland in October 2013, at the age of 20 and has since had over 80 caps, including appearing in 2018, 2022 and 2026 FIFA World Cup qualifications.

== Club career ==
=== HJK ===
Lod scored his first goal on his senior debut for HJK on 22 October 2011 in a 4−1 home win against MYPA. During the 2012 season he played for VPS on loan from HJK. Having initially been loaned out on 9 August 2012 until 3 September 2012, the loan was extended subsequently until the end of the season.

After the 2014 season Lod was selected as Player of the Year for Veikkausliiga. Additionally, he was selected as both the best midfield player and the best player of the U21 National Team for the season. Lod featured in 120 games for HJK and netted 21 goals, while also contributing 17 assists.

=== Panathinaikos ===
On 6 May 2015, Lod agreed to terms with Panathinaikos to move to the club in the summer transfer window, signing a three-year contract for a €350,000 transfer fee. On 3 October 2015, he made his Super League Greece debut against Xanthi. On 28 May 2017, he scored in a 1–0 win against Panionios at Leoforos Stadium. Three days later, another goal by Lod helped his club to secure a 3–2 away win against rivals PAOK on the last matchday of the 2016–17 Playoffs depriving PAOK of the possibility to participate in the UEFA Champions League third qualifying round.

After the first half of the 2017–18 season, Lod didn't seem to want to sign a new deal in Greece, and Panathinaikos have financial troubles and could be forced to sell in January transfer window. On 19 February 2018, Panathinaikos finally won away from home in the SuperLeague, defeating AEL 1–0 thanks to a goal from the Finland international midfielder. Lod's goal ended an 11-match run without a victory away from their home stadium. On 10 March 2018, Lod struck a superb late equaliser to salvage a vital point for Panathinaikos against an impressive Asteras Tripolis at Leoforos Alexandras Stadium.

Following Lod's contract expiry with Panathinaikos on 30 June 2018, and despite attempts to reach a renewal agreement, the player left the club on a free transfer considering the debt-related limitations imposed on Panathinaikos regarding the transfer and re-signing of players over the age of 23.

=== Sporting de Gijón ===
On 23 July 2018 Lod signed with Segunda División team Sporting de Gijon. He made his debut appearance and also scored his first goal for Gijon on 26 August 2018 in a match against Gimnàstic de Tarragona.

=== Minnesota United FC ===
On 16 July 2019 Lod signed with MLS franchise Minnesota United for a transfer fee of around $680,000. On 22 May 2022, with a goal in the 20th minute against Dallas FC, Lod scored his 22nd goal for Minnesota United in MLS league play and thus becoming Minnesota United's all-time leading scorer during its history in Major League Soccer.

On 29 July 2022, Lod extended his contract with Minnesota United, signing a new three-year deal with a franchise option for a further year. Lod played in 10 MLS games in the 2023 season, before he suffered a knee injury in May 2023 and was ruled out for the rest of the year.

After recovering from the injury, Lod returned to the starting line-up for the 2024 season, and started hot scoring two goals in his first three league matches of the season. On 19 May 2024, in a 2–1 league win against Portland Timbers, Lod scored his 30th goal for Minnesota, making him the franchise's all-time record goalscorer. In July 2024, Lod was named in the 2024 MLS All-Star Game for the first time in his career. In late-October, Lod received a nomination to win one of the most prestigious award in the industry, the MLS Comeback Player of the Year.

=== Chicago Fire FC ===
Lod signed with Chicago Fire FC as a free agent on 26 December 2025. His contract will run through the summer of 2028.

== International career ==
He made his debut for the Finnish national team on 30 October 2013 in an unofficial friendly match in Qualcomm Stadium, San Diego against Mexico. On 19 January 2015, he played his first official international game in match against Sweden. On 7 October 2016, Lod scored his first international goal in a 2018 FIFA World Cup preliminary game by giving the lead to Finland before they lost 3–2 in the very last minute against Iceland.

== Career statistics ==
=== Club ===
As of match played 25 July 2026

Appearances and goals by club, season and competition
Club	Season	League			Cup (Note: Includes Suomen Cup, Greek Cup, Copa del Rey and U.S. Open Cup)		League cup		Continental		Other		Total	
Club	Season	Division	Apps	Goals	Apps	Goals	Apps	Goals	Apps	Goals	Apps	Goals	Apps	Goals
Klubi 04	2011	Kakkonen	27	14	—		—		—		—		27	14
Klubi 04	2012	Kakkonen	7	2	—		—		—		—		7	2
Klubi 04	Total		34	16	—		—		—		—		34	16
HJK Helsinki	2011	Veikkausliiga	2	1	3	0	0	0	0	0	—		5	1
HJK Helsinki	2012	Veikkausliiga	7	0	2	0	9	0	1 (Note: Appearances in the UEFA Champions League and the UEFA Europa League)	0	—		19	0
HJK Helsinki	2013	Veikkausliiga	28	7	0	0	5	0	0	0	—		33	7
HJK Helsinki	2014	Veikkausliiga	28	6	4	1	5	0	12 (Note: Appearances in the UEFA Champions League) (Note: Appearances in the UEFA Europa League)	2	—		49	9
HJK Helsinki	2015	Veikkausliiga	10	1	2	1	5	2	0	0	—		17	4
HJK Helsinki	Total		75	15	11	2	24	2	13	2	—		121	21
VPS (loan)	2012	Veikkausliiga	11	2	0	0	0	0	0	0	—		11	2
Panathinaikos	2015–16	Super League Greece	16	2	4	0	—		3	0	—		23	2
Panathinaikos	2016–17	Super League Greece	29	5	7	0	—		9	0	—		45	5
Panathinaikos	2017–18	Super League Greece	30	5	3	0	—		4	2	—		37	7
Panathinaikos	Total		75	12	14	0	—		16	2	—		105	14
Sporting Gijón	2018–19	Segunda División	23	4	2	0	—		—		—		25	4
Minnesota United	2019	MLS	10	0	2	1	—		—		1 (Note: Appearances in the MLS Cup Playoffs)	0	13	1
Minnesota United	2020	MLS	20	7	6 (Note: Includes MLS is Back Tournament)	2	–		—		3	1	26	10
Minnesota United	2021	MLS	23	9	0	0	—		—		1	0	24	9
Minnesota United	2022	MLS	30	6	1	0	—		—		1	0	32	6
Minnesota United	2023	MLS	10	0	1	0	—		—		0	0	11	0
Minnesota United	2024	MLS	32	7	0	0	—		—		1 (Note: Includes Leagues Cup)	1	33	8
Minnesota United	2025	MLS	16	2	1	0	—		—		0	0	17	2
Minnesota United	Total		141	31	11	3	—		—		7	2	156	36
Chicago Fire	2026	MLS	15	3	2	0	—		—		0	0	17	3
Career total			371	82	63	7	24	2	29	4	7	2	467	96

=== International ===
As of match played on 26 September 2026

National team	Year	Competitive		Friendly		Total	
National team	Year	Apps	Goals	Apps	Goals	Apps	Goals
Finland	2015	1	0	3	0	4	0
Finland	2016	4	1	4	0	8	1
Finland	2017	5	0	2	2	7	2
Finland	2018	6	0	4	0	10	0
Finland	2019	10	0	0	0	10	0
Finland	2020	2	1	0	0	2	1
Finland	2021	9	1	2	0	11	1
Finland	2022	4	0	4	0	8	0
Finland	2023	4	1	0	0	4	1
Finland	2024	7	0	3	0	10	0
Finland	2025	8	0	1	0	9	0
Finland	2026	1	0	1	0	2	0
Total		61	4	24	2	85	6

=== International goals ===
As of match played on 5 June 2026. Finland score listed first, score column indicates score after each Lod goal.

International goals by date, venue, cap, opponent, score, result and competition
No.	Date	Venue	Cap	Opponent	Score	Result	Competition
1	6 October 2016	Laugardalsvöllur, Reykjavík, Iceland	11	Iceland	2–1	2–3	2018 FIFA World Cup qualification
2	9 November 2017	Telia 5G -areena, Helsinki, Finland	20	Estonia	2–0	3–0	Friendly
3	9 November 2017	Telia 5G -areena, Helsinki, Finland	20	Estonia	3–0	3–0	Friendly
4	16 November 2020	Vasil Levski National Stadium, Sofia, Bulgaria	42	Bulgaria	2–0	2–1	2020–21 UEFA Nations League
5	13 November 2021	Bilino Polje Stadium, Zenica, Bosnia and Herzegovina	51	Bosnia and Herzegovina	2–0	3–1	2022 FIFA World Cup qualification
6	17 November 2023	Helsinki Olympic Stadium, Helsinki, Finland	63	Northern Ireland	4–0	4–0	UEFA Euro 2024 qualification

== Honours ==
Klubi 04

- Kakkonen: 2011

HJK Helsinki

- Veikkausliiga: 2012, 2013, 2014
- Finnish Cup: 2014
- Finnish League Cup: 2015

Individual

- Veikkausliiga Best Player: 2014,
- Veikkausliiga Best Midfielder: 2014,
- MLS All-Star: 2024
