= Alan Benítez =

Paraguayan footballer (born 1994)

Personal information
- Full name: Alan Max Benítez Dominguez
- Date of birth: 25 January 1994 (age 32)
- Place of birth: Asunción, Paraguay
- Height: 1.77 m (5 ft 10 in)
- Position: Right back

Team information
- Current team: Libertad
- Number: 15

Senior career*
Years	Team	Apps	(Gls)
2013–2019	Libertad	98	(2)
2015	→ Rubio Ñu (loan)	16	(1)
2016	→ Benfica B (loan)	27	(1)
2020–2021	Olimpia	18	(0)
2021–2022	Cerro Porteño	19	(1)
2022	Minnesota United	12	(1)
2023–2025	Cerro Porteño	63	(4)
2025–2026	Internacional	11	(0)
2026–	Libertad	18	(1)

International career^{‡}
2011	Paraguay U17	6	(1)
2015	Paraguay U23	2	(0)
2017–	Paraguay	10	(0)
- * Club domestic league appearances and goals as of 15 November 2026 ‡ National team caps and goals as of 15 November 2026

Alan Max Benítez Dominguez (born 25 January 1994) is a Paraguayan professional footballer who plays as a right back for Libertad and the Paraguay national team.

== Club career ==
Born in Asunción, Paraguay, Benítez started his career at Libertad in 2013, before moving to Rubio Ñu in 2015 on loan. On 1 February 2016, he joined Benfica's reserve team on loan.

On 12 July 2022, Benítez signed with Major League Soccer side Minnesota United. On 24 February 2023, Minnesota and Benítez mutually agreed to terminate his deal at the club.

== Career statistics ==
=== International ===
As of match played 13 November 2026

Appearances and goals by national team and year
National team	Year	Apps	Goals
Paraguay	2017	1	0
Paraguay	2018	1	0
Paraguay	2022	3	0
Paraguay	2025	2	0
Paraguay	2026	3	0
Total		10	0
