= 2027 Austin FC season =

Austin FC
2027 season
- Chairman: Anthony Precourt
- Head coach: Jim Curtin
- Stadium: Q2 Stadium
- Average home league attendance: 0
Home colors	Away colors	Third colors

The 2027 season is Austin FC's seventh season in Major League Soccer, the top flight of soccer in the United States. They play in the league's Western Conference. In November 2025 Major League Soccer announced the league would switch to a fall to spring schedule starting with the 2027–28 season. In March 2026, the league announced a "Sprint Season" for the first half of 2027. Each team playing 14 matches to determine qualification for the Sprint Season play-offs.

== Background ==
Austin FC started playing in the MLS Western Conference in 2021, finishing in 12th place with a record of 9W-4D-21L. 2022 brought many new experiences for Austin FC. They lost their first ever U.S. Open Cup match against San Antonio FC in extra time, won their first derby trophy, the Copa Tejas, and qualified for their first-ever MLS Cup Playoffs in just their second season as a franchise. Austin FC advanced to the Western Conference Finals but lost to LAFC. Austin FC fell almost all the way to the bottom of the 2023 standings, with the team finishing in 27th place in Major League Soccer. The new sporting director Rodolfo Borrell was quoted as saying "The team overachieved last year, the team underachieved this year", but showed his support for coach Josh Wolff as the team looks to rebuild for the 2024 season. At the end of the 2024 season, and after back-back seasons without reaching the MLS playoffs, Austin FC release their first ever coach Josh Wolff, having an interim coach for the final game of the season. In November 2024, Austin announced Nico Estévez as the second coach for the franchise. 2025 saw Austin advance to the finals of the 2025 U.S. Open Cup, falling to Nashville SC 2–1 at home, and one month later qualify for their second every MLS Cup playoffs, before falling in the first round to Los Angeles FC. In mid–May 2025, Austin FC announced the release of both Sporting Director Rodolfo Borrell and Head Coach Nico Estévez. Davy Arnaud was announced as the interim coach for the remainder of the 2026 season. In June 2026, Austin announced the hiring of Jim Curtin as the new head coach starting in the 2027 season.

== Summary ==
=== Pre-season ===
Austin made their first moves of the offseason on November 10, 2026, when they announced the release of Brendan Hines-Ike, Ilie Sánchez, and Riley Thomas from the squad. Hines-Ike contract was up and Austin FC made the decision to not exercise the option on Sánchez and Thomas.

== Management team ==
Position	Name
Chairman	(United States) Anthony Precourt
Chief Soccer Officer and Sporting Director	(Sweden) Khaled El-Ahmad
Head coach	(United States) Jim Curtin
Assistant coach	(United States) Davy Arnaud
Assistant coach	(Spain) Alberto González
Assistant coach	(United States) Terry Boss
Goalkeeping Coach	(United States) Fabio Hernandaz

== Roster ==
As of November 10, 2026.

No.	Name	Nationality	Position(s)	Date of birth (age)	Signed in	Previous club	Apps	Goals
Goalkeepers
1	Brad Stuver	(United States)	GK	April 16, 1991 (age 35)	2020	(United States) New York City FC	0	0
12	Damian Las	(United States)	GK	April 11, 2002 (age 24)	2022	(England) Fulham F.C.	0	0
Defenders
3	Mikkel Desler	(Denmark)	DF	February 19, 1995 (age 31)	2024	(France) Toulouse FC	0	0
5	Oleksandr Svatok	(Ukraine)	CB	September 27, 1994 (age 32)	2024	(Ukraine) SC Dnipro-1	0	0
15	Jon Bell	(Jamaica)	DF	August 26, 1997 (age 29)	2026	(United States) Seattle Sounders	0	0
17	Jon Gallagher	(Republic of Ireland)	LB/RB	February 23, 1996 (age 30)	2020	(United States) Atlanta United FC	0	0
22	Chris Applewhite	(United States)	LB/RB	August 23, 2007 (age 19)	2026	(United States) Nashville SC	0	0
29	Guilherme Biro	(Brazil)	LB	May 2, 2000 (age 26)	2024	(Brazil) Mirassol	0	0
35	Mateja Djordjevic (U22) (Note: U22 initiative)	(Serbia)	DF	July 17, 2003 (age 23)	2025	(Serbia) FK TSC	0	0
Midfielders
14	Besard Šabović	(Sweden)	MF	January 5, 1998 (age 28)	2025	(Sweden) Djurgårdens	0	0
30	Joseph Rosales	(Honduras)	DF	November 6, 2000 (age 26)	2026	(United States) Minnesota United	0	0
32	Micah Burton (HG)	(United States)	MF	March 26, 2006 (age 20)	2024	(United States) Austin FC II	0	0
38	Ervin Torres (HG)	(United States)	MF	November 14, 2007 (age 18)	2025	(United States) Austin FC II	0	0
	Eze Onuoha (U22)	(Finland)	MF	December 19, 2008 (age 17)	2027	(Finland) SJK	0	0
	Nicolás Dubersarsky (U22)	(Argentina)	MF	December 21, 2004 (age 21)	2025	(Argentina) Instituto	0	0
Forward
9	Brandon Vázquez	(United States)	FW	October 14, 1998 (age 28)	2025	(Mexico) C.F. Monterrey	0	0
10	Myrto Uzuni (DP)	(Albania)	FW	May 31, 1995 (age 31)	2025	(Spain) Granada	0	0
11	Facundo Torres	(Uruguay)	FW	April 13, 2000 (age 26)	2026	(Brazil) Palmeiras	0	0
21	Christian Rameriz	(United States)	FW	April 4, 1991 (age 35)	2026	(United States) LA Galaxy	0	0
77	Przemysław Płacheta	(Poland)	FW	March 23, 1998 (age 28)	2026	(England) Oxford United	0	0
	CJ Fodrey (GA)	(United States)	FW	February 10, 2004 (age 22)	2023	(United States) San Diego State	0	0

== Transfers ==
=== In ===
Date	Position	No.	Name	From	Fee	Ref.
November 2, 2026	MF		(Finland) Eze Onuoha	(Finland) SJK		

=== Loan in ===
No.	Pos.	Player	Loaned from	Start	End	Source
22	DF	(United States) Chris Applewhite	(United States) Nashville SC	September 2, 2026	June 30, 2027	

=== Out ===
Date	Position	No.	Name	To	Type	Fee	Ref.
November 10, 2026	DF	2	(United States) Riley Thomas		Declined contract extension	N/A	
November 10, 2026	DF	4	(United States) Brendan Hines-Ike		Out of Contract	N/A	
November 10, 2026	MF	6	(Spain) Ilie Sánchez		Declined contract extension	N/A	

=== Loan out ===
No.	Pos.	Player	Loaned to	Start	End	Source
24	MF	(Argentina) Nicolás Dubersarsky	(Argentina) Tigre	July 30, 2026	June 30, 2027	
19	FW	(United States) CJ Fodrey	(Scotland) Falkirk	August 26, 2026	June 30, 2027	

== Competitive fixtures ==
=== Overall record ===
Competition	First match	Last match	Starting round	Final position	Record							
Competition	First match	Last match	Starting round	Final position	Pld	W	D	L	GF	GA	GD	Win %
MLS regular season	February 20	May 8	Matchday 1	TBD	0	0	0	0	0	0	+0	—
Total					0	0	0	0	0	0	+0	—

Source: Soccerway

=== Major League Soccer Regular Season ===
==== Matches ====
Win	Draw	Loss

Matchday	Date	Opponent	Venue	Location	Result (Note: Austin FC's score written first)	Scorers	Attendance	Referee	Position
1 Copa Tejas	February 20	FC Dallas	Q2 Stadium	Austin, Texas					
2	February 27	St. Louis City SC	Energizer Park	St. Louis, Missouri					
3	March 3	Colorado Rapids	Q2 Stadium	Austin, Texas					
4	March 6	Seattle Sounders FC	Q2 Stadium	Austin, Texas					
5	March 13	Portland Timbers	Providence Park	Portland, Oregon					
6	March 20	San Diego FC	Snapdragon Stadium	San Diego, California					
7	March 27	Los Angeles FC	Q2 Stadium	Austin, Texas					
8 Copa Tejas	April 3	Houston Dynamo FC	Shell Energy Stadium	Houston, Texas					
9	April 7	San Jose Earthquakes	Q2 Stadium	Austin, Texas					
10	April 10	Vancouver Whitecaps FC	BC Place	Vancouver Canada					
11	April 17	Sporting Kansas City	Q2 Stadium	Austin, Texas					
12	April 24	Minnesota United FC	Allianz Field	Saint Paul, Minnesota					
13	May 1	Real Salt Lake	Q2 Stadium	Austin, Texas					
14	May 8	LA Galaxy	Dignity Health Sports Park	Carson, California					

== Statistics ==
=== Appearances and goals ===
Numbers after plus–sign (+) denote appearances as a substitute.

No.	Pos	Nat	Player	Total		MLS	
No.	Pos	Nat	Player	Apps	Goals	Apps	Goals
1	GK	(United States) USA	Brad Stuver	0	0	0+0	0
3	DF	(Denmark) DEN	Mikkel Desler	0	0	0+0	0
5	DF	(Ukraine) UKR	Oleksandr Svatok	0	0	0+0	0
9	FW	(United States) USA	Brandon Vázquez	0	0	0+0	0
10	FW	(Albania) ALB	Myrto Uzuni	0	0	0+0	0
11	MF	(Uruguay) URU	Facundo Torres	0	0	0+0	0
12	GK	(United States) USA	Damian Las	0	0	0+0	0
14	MF	(Sweden) SWE	Besard Šabović	0	0	0+0	0
15	DF	(Jamaica) JAM	Jon Bell	0	0	0+0	0
17	FW	(Republic of Ireland) IRL	Jon Gallagher	0	0	0+0	0
21	FW	(United States) USA	Christian Ramirez	0	0	0+0	0
29	DF	(Brazil) BRA	Guilherme Biro	0	0	0+0	0
30	DF	(Honduras) HON	Joseph Rosales	0	0	0+0	0
32	MF	(United States) USA	Micah Burton	0	0	0+0	0
35	DF	(Serbia) SRB	Mateja Djordjevic	0	0	0+0	0
38	MF	(United States) USA	Ervin Torres	0	0	0+0	0
77	FW	(Poland) POL	Przemysław Płacheta	0	0	0+0	0

- Last updated: November 1, 2026
- Source: https://www.austinfc.com/stats/
