= 2025 Austin FC season =

Austin FC
2025 season
- Chairman: Anthony Precourt
- Head coach: Nico Estévez
- Stadium: Q2 Stadium
- MLS: 15th
- MLS Cup playoffs: First round
- U.S. Open Cup: Runners-up
- Top goalscorer: League: Owen Wolff (7); All: Brandon Vázquez; Myrto Uzuni (9 each)
- Highest home attendance: 20,738
- Average home league attendance: 20,738
- Biggest win: 4 matches by 2 goals (MLS); ATX 3–1 HOU (5/21) USOC
- Biggest defeat: VAN 5–1 ATX (4/11) MLS; ATX 1–2 NSH (10/1) USOC; ATX 1–4 LAFC (11/2) MLS Cup
Home colors	Away colors	Third colors

The 2025 season was Austin FC's fifth season in Major League Soccer, the top flight of soccer in the United States. They played in the league's Western Conference.

== Background ==
Austin FC started playing in the MLS Western Conference in 2021, finishing in 12th place with a record of 9W-4D-21L. 2022 brought many new experiences to Austin FC. They lost their first ever U.S. Open Cup match against San Antonio FC in extra time, won their first trophy, the Copa Tejas, and qualified for their first-ever MLS Cup Playoffs in just their second season as a franchise. Austin FC advanced to the Western Conference Finals but lost to LAFC. Austin FC fell almost all the way to the bottom of the 2023 standings, with the team finishing in 27th place in Major League Soccer. The new sporting director Rodolfo Borrell was quoted as saying "The team overachieved last year, the team underachieved this year", but showed his support for coach Josh Wolff as the team looks to rebuild for the 2024 season. At the end of the 2024 season, and after back-back seasons without reaching the MLS playoffs, Austin FC release their first ever coach Josh Wolff, having an interim coach for the final game of the season.

== Summary ==
=== Pre-season ===
Austin FC started their 2025 roster build the week after their final game of the 2024 season. On October 21, 2024, Austin announced they had extended Jáder Obrian's contract through 2026 with a 1-year club option, after being one of the top goal scorers for the 2024 season. The next day, Austin FC announced the contract extension of Owen Wolff, the team's first homegrown player, signing him through 2027 with a 1-year club option. With their third announcement in three days, Austin FC announced the extension of Brendan Hines-Ike through the 2025 season with a 1-year club option. Austin FC continued agreeing to contract extensions for the fourth straight day, announcing Diego Rubio had been signed through the 2025 season with a 1-year club option. Closing out a week of updates, Austin FC announced the hiring of Nico Estévez as the new coach, with plans for him to join the team after the November 2024 FIFA window. On November 5, 2024, Austin FC announced their roster decision headed into the 2025 season. Austin exercised their club option on Daniel Pereira and Jimmy Farkarlun while they did not exercise the option for Matt Hedges, Jhojan Valencia, Alexander Ring, Ethan Finlay, and Matt Bersano. With Hector Jiménez out of contract the team continues to negotiate for his service during the 2025 season. After exercising their option on Pereira, Austin FC announced they had signed him to a new contract through the 2025 season with an option for 2026. After recently obtaining his Green Card, Pereira will hold a senior spot on the roster, but no longer an international slot. On December 9, 2024, Austin FC announced they had used their season buyout on Gyasi Zardes, opening up a senior slot and removing his salary from the 2025 budget. On December 17, 2024, Austin FC announced they would participate in the Coachella Valley Invitational for the second year in a row. This event will take place in February 2025 and Austin will face LA Galaxy, Sporting Kansas City, and Charlotte FC. The 2025 MLS SuperDraft was held on December 20, 2024. Austin traded its first round pick and $75,000 GAM to Colorado Rapids for a 2025 International slot. In the second round they selected defender Riley Thomas from North Carolina and in the third round they selected forward Patrick Gryczewski from Rhode Island. On the last day of 2024, Austin FC announced they had signed Ilie for the 2025 season with an option for the 2026 season. On January 6, 2025, Austin announced they had acquired Brandon Vázquez from C.F. Monterrey for a team-record transfer fee. Vázquez signed a contract through 2028 with a one year option and will hold a designated player and senior team slot on the roster. In order to move to the top of MLS's waiver order, Austin also had to trade $50,000 of 2025 GAM and $50,000 of 2026 GAM to San Jose Earthquakes. On January 13, 2025 Austin signed Nicolás Dubersarsky from Instituto. Dubersarsky is signed as part of the MLS U-22 initiative. On January 17, 2025, Austin FC announced an agreement had been reached to transfer agreement with River Plate for Sebastián Driussi. Austin FC received $10 million and an 8.25% sell on fee for Driussi upon his transfer to River Plate. On January 21, 2025, Austin FC announced the signing of free agent Besard Šabović to a contract through 2027 with a one-year option. On January 23, 2025, Austin FC announced they had extended Žan Kolmanič's contract through the 2026 season, with an additional one year option. On January 24, 2025, Austin FC announced they had signed Albanian forward Myrto Uzuni for a club record $12 million. Uzuni will hold a designated player, senior team, and international roster slot for Austin FC. On January 31, Austin announced they had loaned Damian Las to Louisville City FC for the 2024 season. and Guilherme Biro signed a contract extension keeping with the team through the 2027 season, with a one-year option. To close out the preseason, Austin announced they had extended Damian Las's contract through the 2027 season, with a one year option.

=== February/March ===
Austin started the season with a 1–0 win against Sporting Kansas City on a 76th-minute goal from Osman Bukari. In their first road game of the year, Austin travelled to Portland, falling 1–0 on an 89th minute Timbers' goal. After outshooting their opponents 21–6 in the third game of the season, Austin FC lost their first home match 0–1 to the Colorado Rapids. Traveling to Los Angeles for the first time of the season, Austin FC pulled out a hard fought 1–0 win against Los Angeles FC. Facing San Diego FC for the first time in club history, Austin FC held off the expansion team on a strong match by Owen Wolff. Goals being scored by Brandon Vázquez and Jon Gallagher. Traveling to St. Louis, Austin FC earned their third win in a row, beating St. Louis City SC 1–0 on the back of Myrto Uzuni first goal of the season.

=== April/May ===
Continuing the strong defensive showing that has become the theme of the season, Austin held Portland Timbers scoreless, earning a 0–0 draw at home. On April 11, Austin announced the signing of Riley Thomas to the first team for the 2025 season, with options for 2026 and 2027. Riley also was signed on loan to Austin FC II, allowing him to continue to play with Austin's MLS Next Pro team. Austin travelled to the Western Conference leaders, Vancouver Whitecaps FC, falling 1–5 on a 4-goal game by Brian White. Looking to bounce back, Austin hosted LA Galaxy, holding them scoreless, for their fifth clean sheet of the year and earning the 1–0 win. Austin will be without Brendan Hines-Ike in the next game after he was shown a red card in 90+2 minute of the game. On April 23, Austin FC announced the signing of Robert Taylor from Inter Miami CF in a trade for $450,000 GAM in 2025, $250,000 GAM in 2026, and a conditional $50,000 in 2027. Taylor is signed through the 2026 season, with a one-year option. In their first Copa Tejas match, Austin travelled to Houston, falling 0–2, while also losing Dani Pereira to an injury. Austin returned home following the Copa Tejas match to face Minnesota United FC, falling 0–3 and becoming the worse scoring Western Conference team so far this season, with only seven goals in 11 games. After their USOC round of 32 win, Austin returned to league play three days later, falling to FC Cincinnati 1–2, with the lone Austin goal coming from a Vázquez PK. Austin extended their winless streak to five games by drawing with Vancouver at home 0–0. Austin returned to MLS play after their second USOC win to face Minnesota United, earning a 1–1 draw on the back of Žan Kolmanič's first ever goal for ATX. Continuing their home streak, Austin earned a record–breaking fourth draw in a row against Real Salt Lake finishing 1–1 on a second half stoppage time goal by Diego Rubio. Austin closed out the month of May, by matching its longest league winless streak, falling 0–2 to San Diego on the road.

=== June/July ===
Austin started the month of June by winning their first league match in six-week, 2–0 against Colorado Rapids, on goals by Mikkel Desler and an own goal as the result of a Hines-Ike header. Austin continued their best offensive performance of the season, beating New York Red Bulls 2–1 at Q2 Stadium on goals from Vázquez and Biro. On the road in Seattle, Austin fell 0–2 to the sounders. On June 30, 2025, Austin announced the signing of Nicky Beloko a midfielder from FC Luzern on a free transfer. Beloko signed with Austin in January 2025 and is signed through the 2028 season, with an option for 2029 season. In their first match without their leading scorer, Austin was held scoreless at home by New England Revolution, earning a 0–0 draw on a strong performance by Brad Stuver. In their third game in nine days, Austin earned a win against LA Galaxy, 2–1 on goals from Uzuni and Wolff. On July 24, announced the signing of Serbian defender Mateja Djordjevic on a transfer from FK TSC. Djordjevic was signed on the U22 initiative through the 2028 season with a one-year option. Austin next travelled to the D.C., earning a strong 4–2 win over the United on goals from Uzuni, Wolff, Bukari, and Taylor. Taylor's goal was the first for him with Austin.

=== August/September/October ===
Austin dropped two points upon return to play after the Leagues Cup break, drawing with Houston on two late goals by Jack McGlynn. Austin Goals came from Sanchez and Biro in the first half. In their second Copa Tejas match in a row, Austin failed to gain all three points, drawing against Dallas 1–1. Owen Wolff scoring the lone goal for Austin, on a strong header from a Dessler cross. Austin travelled to Canada, but failed to earn any points by falling 2–3 to CF Montréal. Goals were scored by Uzuni and Wolff. Austin closed out the month of August with a crucial 3– win over San Jose, jumping two places in the playoff race. With three players out on international duty, Austin travelled to Kansas City and earned three points on a 2–1 victory over Sporting KC. Goals were scored by Wolff and Fodrey, his first of his MLS career. Austin travelled to Dallas for the final Copa Tejas match of the season, but failed to gain any momentum, falling 0–2. Playing just 4 days after 120 winner in the U.S. Open Cup, Austin took another game to the last minute before earning a 2–1 win against Seattle in the 90+6 minute on a goal by Uzuni, adding to Rubio's first-half goal. Playing with a heavily rotated starting eleven, as the team prepares for the USOC final, Austin fell on the road in Salt Lake, 1–3. The lone goal of the match was scored in second half stoppage time by Šabović, for his first goal of the season. With an opportunity to outright secure a playoff position, Austin fell to St. Louis at home 1–3, with the lone goal being scored by Svatak, his first for the club. The following day, Austin qualified for the playoffs after Vancouver defeated San Jose. With both teams missing starting players due to the international window, Austin earned another three points at home with a 1–0 win of LAFC on an 83rd-minute goal by Wolff. Austin closed out the regular season with a 2–1 road loss to San Jose with the lone goal being scored by Wolff.

== Management team ==
Position	Name
Chairman	(United States) Anthony Precourt
Sporting Director	Rodolfo Borrell
Head coach	(Spain) Nico Estévez
Assistant coach	(United States) Davy Arnaud
Assistant coach	(Spain) Alberto González
Goalkeeping Coach	(Canada) Cameron Sauro

== Roster ==
As of November 2, 2025.

No.	Name	Nationality	Position(s)	Date of birth (age)	Signed in	Previous club	Apps	Goals
Goalkeepers
1	Brad Stuver	(United States)	GK	April 16, 1991 (age 35)	2020	(United States) New York City FC	40	0
30	Stefan Cleveland	(United States)	GK	May 25, 1994 (age 32)	2024	(United States) Seattle Sounders FC	1	0
Defenders
2	Riley Thomas	(United States)	DF	March 15, 2002 (age 24)	2025	(United States) Austin FC II	0	0
3	Mikkel Desler	(Denmark)	DF	February 19, 1995 (age 31)	2024	(France) Toulouse FC	25	1
4	Brendan Hines-Ike	(United States)	DF	November 30, 1994 (age 31)	2024	(United States) D.C. United	37	0
5	Oleksandr Svatok	(Ukraine)	CB	September 27, 1994 (age 32)	2024	(Ukraine) SC Dnipro-1	34	1
17	Jon Gallagher	(Republic of Ireland)	LB/RB	February 23, 1996 (age 30)	2020	(United States) Atlanta United FC	41	2
18	Julio Cascante	(Costa Rica)	CB	October 3, 1993 (age 33)	2020	(United States) Portland Timbers	19	0
23	Žan Kolmanič	(Slovenia)	LB	March 3, 2000 (age 26)	2021	(Slovenia) Maribor	30	1
29	Guilherme Biro	(Brazil)	LB	May 2, 2000 (age 26)	2024	(Brazil) Mirassol	38	3
35	Mateja Djordjevic (U22) (Note: U22 initiative)	(Serbia)	DF	July 17, 2003 (age 23)	2025	(Serbia) FK TSC	5	0
Midfielders
6	Ilie Sánchez	(Spain)	MF	November 21, 1990 (age 35)	2025	(United States) Los Angeles FC	32	2
8	Daniel Pereira (GA)	(Venezuela)	MF	July 14, 2000 (age 26)	2021	(United States) Virginia Tech Hokies	32	2
14	Besard Šabović	(Sweden)	MF	January 5, 1998 (age 28)	2025	(Sweden) Djurgårdens	37	1
16	Robert Taylor	(Finland)	MF	October 21, 1994 (age 32)	2025	(United States) Inter Miami CF	22	1
20	Nicolás Dubersarsky (U22)	(Argentina)	MF	December 21, 2004 (age 21)	2025	(Argentina) Instituto	25	0
27	Nicky Beloko	(Switzerland)	MF	February 16, 2000 (age 26)	2025	(Switzerland) Luzern	0	0
32	Micah Burton (HG)	(United States)	MF	March 26, 2006 (age 20)	2024	(United States) Austin FC II	0	0
33	Owen Wolff (HG)	(United States)	MF	December 30, 2004 (age 21)	2020	(United States) Austin FC Academy	39	7
38	Ervin Torres	(United States)	MF	November 14, 2007 (age 18)	2024	(United States) Austin FC II	1	0
Forward
7	Jáder Obrian	(Colombia)	FW	May 18, 1995 (age 31)	2024	(United States) FC Dallas	35	0
9	Brandon Vázquez	(United States)	FW	October 14, 1998 (age 28)	2025	(Mexico) C.F. Monterrey	22	9
10	Myrto Uzuni (DP)	(Albania)	FW	May 31, 1995 (age 31)	2025	(Spain) Granada	34	9
11	Osman Bukari (DP)	(Ghana)	FW	December 13, 1998 (age 27)	2024	(Serbia) Red Star Belgrade	38	5
19	CJ Fodrey (GA)	(United States)	FW	February 10, 2004 (age 22)	2023	(United States) San Diego State	27	2
21	Diego Rubio	(Chile)	FW	May 15, 1993 (age 33)	2024	(United States) Colorado Rapids	30	1
26	Jimmy Farkarlun	(Liberia)	FW	July 14, 2001 (age 25)	2024	(United States) Austin FC II	0	0

== Transfers ==
=== In ===
Date	Position	No.	Name	From	Fee	Ref.
December 31, 2024	MF	6	(Spain) Ilie Sánchez	(United States) Los Angeles FC	Free Agent	
January 6, 2025	FW	9	(United States) Brandon Vázquez	(Mexico) C.F. Monterrey	$10 million	
January 24, 2025	FW	10	(Albania) Myrto Uzuni	(Spain) Granada	$12 million	
January 13, 2025	MF	20	(Argentina) Nicolás Dubersarsky	(Argentina) Instituto	$2.1 million	
January 21, 2025	MF	14	(Sweden) Besard Šabović	(Sweden) Djurgårdens	free agent	
April 11, 2025	DF	2	(United States) Riley Thomas	(United States) Austin FC II	free agent	
April 23, 2025	MF	16	(Finland) Robert Taylor	(United States) Inter Miami CF	$700,000 GAM	
June 30, 2025	MF	27	(Switzerland) Nicky Beloko	(Switzerland) Luzern	free	
July 24, 2025	DF	35	(Serbia) Mateja Djordjevic	(Serbia) FK TSC	$1 million	

=== Loan in ===
No.	Pos.	Player	Loaned from	Start	End	Source
2	DF	(United States) Riley Thomas	(United States) Austin FC II	March 14, 2025; March 22, 2025; March 29, 2025; April 4, 2025	March 17, 2025; March 25, 2025; April 1, 2025; April 7, 2025	
34	DF	(United States) Antonio Gomez	(United States) Austin FC II	March 22, 2025; April 25, 2025; September 6, 2025	March 25, 2025; April 28, 2025; September 9, 2025	
40	DF	(Netherlands) Nico Van Rijn	(United States) Austin FC II	March 22, 2025; June 13, 2025	March 25, 2025; June 16, 2025	
38	MF	(United States) Ervin Torres	(United States) Austin FC II	April 11, 2025; September 6, 2025	April 14, 2025; September 9, 2025	
37	MF	(United States) Adrián González	(United States) Austin FC II	September 6, 2025; October 11, 2025	September 9, 2025; October 14, 2025	

=== Out ===
Date	Position	No.	Name	To	Type	Fee	Ref.
November 5, 2024	DF	2	(United States) Matt Hedges	(United States) Des Moines Menace	Declined contract option	N/A	
November 5, 2024	MF	5	(Colombia) Jhojan Valencia	(Chile) Universidad Católica	Declined contract option	N/A	
November 5, 2024	MF	8	(Finland) Alexander Ring	(Finland) HJK Helsinki	Declined contract option	N/A	
November 5, 2024	MF	13	(United States) Ethan Finlay	Retired	Declined contract option	N/A	
November 5, 2024	GK	20	(United States) Matt Bersano	Retired	Declined contract option	N/A	
November 5, 2024	DF	16	(United States) Hector Jiménez	Retired	Out of Contract	N/A	
December 9, 2024	FW	9	(United States) Gyasi Zardes		Contract buyout	$1,000,000 buyout fee	
January 17, 2025	MF	10	(Argentina) Sebastián Driussi	(Argentina) River Plate	Transfer	$10 mil + 8.25% sell on fee	
March 25, 2025	DF	15	(Finland) Leo Väisänen	(Sweden) BK Häcken	Transfer	$450,000	
August 21, 2025	MF	27	(Switzerland) Nicky Beloko	(Switzerland) Lausanne	Transfer	Free + 15% sell on fee	

=== Loan out ===
No.	Pos.	Player	Loaned to	Start	End	Source
12	GK	(United States) Damian Las	(United States) Louisville City FC	January 31	December 31	
32	MF	(United States) Micah Burton	(United States) Austin FC II	March 7	December 31	
26	FW	(Liberia) Jimmy Farkarlun	(United States) Austin FC II	March 7	December 31	
19	FW	(United States) CJ Fodrey	(United States) Austin FC II	March 7	December 31	
2	DF	(United States) Riley Thomas	(United States) Austin FC II	April 11	December 31	
30	GK	(United States) Stefan Cleveland	(United States) Austin FC II	April 27	December 31	

=== MLS Re-Entry Draft picks ===
2024 Austin FC Re-Entry Picks
Round	Selection	Player	Position	Team	Notes	Ref.
1	12	PASS				
2	12 (42)	PASS				

=== MLS SuperDraft picks ===
2025 Austin FC SuperDraft Picks
Round	Selection	Player	Position	College	Notes	Ref.
1	12	N/A			Acquired 2025 International roster slot in trade with Chicago Fire for 12th pick and $75,000 in 2026 GAM	
2	12 (42)	(United States) Riley Thomas	DF	North Carolina	Signed with Austin FC II on February 13; Signed to first team on April 11	
3	12 (72)	(United States) Patrick Gryczewski	FW	Rhode Island	Signed with Austin FC II on February 13	

=== New contracts ===
Date	Pos.	No.	Player	Contract until	Ref.
October 21, 2024	FW	11	(Colombia) Jáder Obrian	2026 + 1yr option	
October 22, 2024	MF	33	(United States) Owen Wolff	2027 + 1yr option	
October 23, 2024	DF	4	(United States) Brendan Hines-Ike	2025 + 1yr option	
October 24, 2024	FW	14	(Chile) Diego Rubio	2025 + 1yr option	
November 8, 2024	MF	6	(Venezuela) Daniel Pereira	2025 + 1yr option	
January 23, 2025	DF	23	(Slovenia) Žan Kolmanič	2026 + 1yr option	
January 31, 2025	DF	29	(Brazil) Guilherme Biro	2027 + 1yr option	
February 21, 2025	GK	12	(United States) Damian Las	2027 + 1yr option	
April 25, 2025	FW	19	(United States) CJ Fodrey	2027 + 2yr option	
September 25, 2025	GK	1	(United States) Brad Stuver	2027 + 1yr option	

== Non-competitive fixtures ==
=== Preseason ===
Win	Draw	Loss

Date	Opponent	Venue	Location	Result (Note: Austin FC's score written first)	Scorers	Attendance	Notes
January 21	New England Revolution	IMG Academy Bradenton	Bradenton, Florida	0–1	-	N/A	Played as two 35 minute halves
January 24	Charleston Battery	Joe DiMaggio Sports Complex	Clearwater, Florida	3–0	Vázquez PK; Vázquez; Gallagher	N/A	
February 1	Louisville City FC	Q2 Stadium	Austin, Texas	3–1	Hines-Ike 15'; Rubio 45'; Pereira 86'	N/A	
February 5	LA Galaxy	Coachella Valley Invitational	Indio, California	1–1	Bukari 77'	N/A	
February 8	St. Louis City SC	Coachella Valley Invitational	Indio, California	1–1	Obrian 46'	N/A	
February 12	Charlotte FC	Coachella Valley Invitational	Indio, California	0–1	-	N/A	
February 15	Nashville SC	Q2 Stadium	Austin, Texas	2–1	Bukari 12' 69'	N/A	

== Competitive fixtures ==
=== Overall record ===
Competition	First match	Last match	Starting round	Final position	Record							
Competition	First match	Last match	Starting round	Final position	Pld	W	D	L	GF	GA	GD	Win %
MLS regular season	February 22, 2025	October 18, 2025	Matchday 1	6th, Western Conference	34	13	8	13	37	44	−7	38.24
U.S. Open Cup	May 7, 2025	October 1, 2025	Round of 32	Runners–up	5	3	1	1	11	8	+3	60.00
MLS playoffs	October 29, 2025		Round One	Round One	2	0	0	2	2	6	−4	0.00
Total					41	16	9	16	50	58	−8	39.02

Last updated: November 2, 2025
Source: Soccerway

=== Major League Soccer Regular Season ===
==== Standings ====
===== Western Conference =====
MLS Western Conference table (2025)
Pos	Team	Pld	W	L	T	GF	GA	GD	Pts	Qualification
4	Minnesota United FC	34	16	8	10	56	39	+17	58	Qualification for round one
5	Seattle Sounders FC	34	15	9	10	58	48	+10	55	Qualification for round one
6	Austin FC	34	13	13	8	37	45	−8	47	Qualification for round one
7	FC Dallas	34	11	12	11	52	55	−3	44	Qualification for round one
8	Portland Timbers	34	11	12	11	41	48	−7	44	Qualification for the wild card round

Source: MLS
Rules for classification: 1) points; 2) total wins; 3) total goal differential; 4) total goals scored; 5) fewer disciplinary points; 6) away goal differential; 7) away goals scored; 8) home goals differential; 9) home goals scored; 10) coin toss (2 clubs tied) or drawing of lots (≥3 clubs tied)

===== Overall =====
Overall MLS standings table (2025)
Pos	Team	Pld	W	L	T	GF	GA	GD	Pts
13	Chicago Fire FC	34	15	11	8	68	60	+8	53
14	Orlando City SC	34	14	9	11	63	51	+12	53
15	Austin FC	34	13	13	8	37	45	−8	47
16	FC Dallas	34	11	12	11	52	55	−3	44
17	Portland Timbers	34	11	12	11	41	48	−7	44

Source: MLS
Rules for classification: 1) points; 2) total wins; 3) total goal differential; 4) total goals scored; 5) fewer disciplinary points; 6) away goal differential; 7) away goals scored; 8) home goals differential; 9) home goals scored; 10) coin toss (2 clubs tied) or drawing of lots (≥3 clubs tied)

==== Matches ====
Win	Draw	Loss

Matchday	Date	Opponent	Venue	Location	Result (Note: Austin FC's score written first)	Scorers	Attendance	Referee	Position
1	February 22	Sporting Kansas City	Q2 Stadium	Austin, Texas	1–0	Bukari 76'	20,738	Chris Penso	10th
2	March 1	Portland Timbers	Providence Park	Portland, Oregon	0–1	–	20,032	Ismir Pekmic	13th
3	March 8	Colorado Rapids	Q2 Stadium	Austin, Texas	0–1	–	20,738	Marcos DeOliveira	22nd
4	March 15	Los Angeles FC	BMO Stadium	Los Angeles, California	1–0	Biro 12'	22,111	Rubiel Vazquez	20th
5	March 23	San Diego FC	Q2 Stadium	Austin, Texas	2–1	Vázquez 10', Gallagher 19'	20,738	Filip Dujic	8th
6	March 30	St. Louis City SC	Energizer Park	St. Louis, Missouri	1–0	Uzuni 33'	22,423	Sergii Boiko	5th
7	April 5	Portland Timbers	Q2 Stadium	Austin, Texas	0–0	–	20,738	Drew Fischer	8th
8	April 12	Vancouver Whitecaps FC	BC Place	Vancouver, British Columbia	1–5	Pereira 90'	17,931	Víctor Rivas	12th
9	April 19	LA Galaxy	Q2 Stadium	Austin, Texas	1–0	Vázquez 81'	20,738	Rosendo Mendoza	7th
10; Copa Tejas	April 26	Houston Dynamo FC	Shell Energy Stadium	Houston, Texas	0–2	–	17,808	Chris Penso	9th
11	May 3	Minnesota United FC	Q2 Stadium	Austin, Texas	0–3	–	20,738	Armando Villarreal	15th
12	May 10	FC Cincinnati	TQL Stadium	Cincinnati, Ohio	1–2	Vázquez 48' (pen.)	25,513	Tori Penso	18th
13	May 14	Atlanta United FC	Q2 Stadium	Austin, Texas	1–1	Vázquez 55'	20,738	Malik Badawi	18th
14	May 17	Vancouver Whitecaps FC	Q2 Stadium	Austin, Texas	0–0	–	20,738	Alexis Da Silva	20th
15	May 24	Minnesota United FC	Allianz Field	Saint Paul, Minnesota	1–1	Kolmanič 27'	19,240	Joe Dickerson	20th
16	May 28	Real Salt Lake	Q2 Stadium	Austin, Texas	1–1	Rubio 90+3'	20,738	Lukasz Szpala	20th
17	May 31	San Diego FC	Snapdragon Stadium	San Diego, California	0–2	–	27,133	Ricardo Montero	21st
18	June 7	Colorado Rapids	Dick's Sporting Goods Park	Commerce City, Colorado	2–0	Desler 6', Navarro 66' (o.g.)	15,701	Allen Chapman	18th
19	June 14	New York Red Bulls	Q2 Stadium	Austin, Texas	2–1	Biro 6'; Vázquez 51'	20,737	Rosendo Mendoza	15th
20	June 28	Seattle Sounders FC	Lumen Field	Seattle, Washington	0–2	–	30,101	Timothy Ford	18th
21	July 12	New England Revolution	Q2 Stadium	Austin, Texas	0–0	–	20,738	Rosendo Mendoza	19th
22	July 16	LA Galaxy	Dignity Health Sports Park	Carson, California	2–1	Uzuni 40'; Wolff 63'	16,272	Ricardo Fierro	17th
23	July 26	D.C. United	Audi Field	Washington, D.C.	4–2	Uzuni 22'; Wolff 45'; Bukari 60'; Taylor 90+2'	17,474	Rubiel Vazquez	17th
24; Copa Tejas	August 9	Houston Dynamo FC	Q2 Stadium	Austin, Texas	2–2	Sánchez 31'; Biro 41'	20,738	Alexis Da Silva	17th
25; Copa Tejas	August 16	FC Dallas	Q2 Stadium	Austin, Texas	1–1	Wolff 51'	20,738	Armando Villarreal	18th
26	August 23	CF Montréal	Stade Saputo	Montreal, Quebec	2–3	Uzuni 40'; Wolff 77'	15,221	Allen Chapman	19th
27	August 30	San Jose Earthquakes	Q2 Stadium	Austin, Texas	3–1	Bukari 12'; Uzuni 33'; Wilson 77' (o.g.)	20,738	Jon Freemon	17th
28	September 7	Sporting Kansas City	Children's Mercy Park	Kansas City, Kansas	2–1	Wolff 37'; Fodrey 82'	15,787	Sergii Boiko	15th
29; Copa Tejas	September 13	FC Dallas	Toyota Stadium	Frisco, Texas	0–2	–	11,004	Victor Rivas	16th
30	September 21	Seattle Sounders FC	Q2 Stadium	Austin, Texas	2–1	Rubio 42'; Uzuni 90+6'	20,738	Jair Marrufo	15th
31	September 27	Real Salt Lake	America First Field	Sandy, Utah	1–3	Šabović 90+2'	20,322	Rubiel Vazquez	15th
32	October 4	St. Louis City SC	Q2 Stadium	Austin, Texas	1–3	Svatok 36'	20,738	Ricardo Fierro	15th
33	October 12	Los Angeles FC	Q2 Stadium	Austin, Texas	1–0	Wolff 83'	20,738	Rosendo Mendoza	15th
34	October 18	San Jose Earthquakes	PayPal Park	San Jose, California	1–2	Wolff 22'	17,033	Filip Dujic	15th

=== MLS Playoffs ===
Austin qualified for the 2025 MLS Cup playoffs when Vancouver defeated San Jose. Austin outright secured their place in the first round of the playoffs after beating LAFC 1-0 at home, earning 6th place in the Western Conference going into the final game of the match. After the completion of decision day matches, Austin FC was matched against LAFC, who finished 3rd in the Western Conference. Travelling to LA for the first game, Austin kept the game close, but fell 1–2 to LAFC. The lone goal was scored by Gallagher. After the game 1 loss, Austin returned home to face LAFC in game 2 of the first round. Austin struggled to maintain their shape and gave up two early breakaway goals eventually falling 1–4 to finish their season. The lone goal was scored by Pereira.

Win	Draw	Loss	TBD

Matchday	Date	Opponent	Venue	Location	Result (Note: Austin FC's score written first)	Scorers	Attendance	Referee
Round One	October 29	Los Angeles FC	BMO Stadium	Los Angeles, California	1–2	Gallagher 63'	22,142	Rosendo Mendoza
Round One	November 2	Los Angeles FC	Q2 Stadium	Austin, Texas	1–4	Pereira 45+6' (pen.)	20,738	Joe Dickerson

=== U.S. Open Cup ===
Austin entered at the Round of 32 for the 2025 U.S. Open Cup and hosted El Paso Locomotive FC. After falling behind 0–2 in the first half, Austin made some personnel changes starting in the 60th minute and mounted a 3 goal comeback, winning 3–2 in full time. Vázquez had two goals and an assist, and Uzuni added the third goal. Wolff also had a strong showing as a substitute adding two assists to the team's offensive efforts. Austin hosted in-state rivals Houston in the Round of 16, earning a 3–1 win on goals by Vazquéz, Bukari, and Sánchez. Austin secured their first ever semi-final appearance after earning a 2–2 draw against San Jose on goals by Vazquéz and Uzuni. Austin went on to advance in the penalty shootout 4–2, with Stuver saving two of San Jose's first three shots from the spot. Austin earned their first cup final in any competition by taking the USOC semifinal match down to the final minute. Super–sub CJ Fodrey scored the game winning goal after Minnesota keeper was forced into a strong save from an Uzuni header. Hosting the final at Q2 Stadium, Austin controlled much of the game, but fell 1–2 to Nashville SC after a second-half penalty. Austin's loan goal was scored by Uzuni at the close of the first half.

Matchday	Date	Opponent	Venue	Location	Result (Note: Austin FC's score written first)	Scorers	Attendance	Referee
Round of 32	May 7	El Paso Locomotive FC	Q2 Stadium	Austin, Texas	3–2	Vázquez 73', 80'; Uzuni 76'	9,086	Elton Garcia
Round of 16	May 21	Houston Dynamo FC	Q2 Stadium	Austin, Texas	3–1	Vázquez 29'; Bukari 56' (pen.); Sánchez 60'	18,532	Timothy Ford
Quarterfinals	July 8	San Jose Earthquakes	PayPal Park	San Jose, California	2−2 (4–2 p)	Vázquez 65'; Uzuni 115'	10,754	Brandon Stevis
Semifinals	September 17	Minnesota United FC	Allianz Field	Saint Paul, Minnesota	2–1 (a.e.t)	Bukari 45+4'; Fodrey 120'	14,621	Alexis Da Silva
Final	October 1	Nashville SC	Q2 Stadium	Austin, Texas	1–2	Uzuni 45+1'	20,738	Tori Penso

=== Leagues Cup ===
Austin FC did not qualify for the 2025 Leagues Cup as they were not one of the top 9 teams in the Western Conference for the 2024 season.

== Statistics ==
=== Appearances and goals ===
Numbers after plus–sign (+) denote appearances as a substitute.

No.	Pos	Nat	Player	Total		MLS		MLS Cup		USOC	
No.	Pos	Nat	Player	Apps	Goals	Apps	Goals	Apps	Goals	Apps	Goals
1	GK	(United States) USA	Brad Stuver	41	0	34+0	0	2+0	0	5+0	0
3	DF	(Denmark) DEN	Mikkel Desler	25	1	18+2	1	2+0	0	3+0	0
4	DF	(United States) USA	Brendan Hines-Ike	37	0	31+0	0	2+0	0	4+0	0
5	DF	(Ukraine) UKR	Oleksandr Svatok	34	1	25+4	1	2+0	0	2+1	0
6	MF	(Spain) ESP	Ilie Sánchez	32	2	20+6	1	2+0	0	3+1	1
7	FW	(Colombia) COL	Jáder Obrian	35	0	9+22	0	0+1	0	2+1	0
8	MF	(Venezuela) VEN	Daniel Pereira	32	2	23+4	1	2+0	1	3+0	0
9	FW	(United States) USA	Brandon Vázquez	22	9	19+0	5	0+0	0	3+0	4
10	FW	(Albania) ALB	Myrto Uzuni	34	9	23+4	6	2+0	0	3+2	3
11	MF	(Ghana) GHA	Osman Bukari	39	5	27+6	3	1+0	0	4+1	2
14	MF	(Sweden) SWE	Besard Šabović	38	0	20+12	0	0+2	0	2+2	0
16	MF	(Finland) FIN	Robert Taylor	21	1	1+16	1	1+1	0	0+2	0
17	FW	(Republic of Ireland) IRL	Jon Gallagher	41	2	26+8	1	2+0	1	3+2	0
18	DF	(Costa Rica) CRC	Julio Cascante	19	0	9+4	0	0+2	0	4+0	0
19	MF	(United States) USA	CJ Fodrey	27	2	2+20	1	0+2	0	0+3	1
20	MF	(Argentina) ARG	Nicolás Dubersarsky	25	0	7+15	0	0+0	0	2+1	0
21	FW	(Chile) CHI	Diego Rubio	30	2	11+14	2	0+0	0	2+3	0
23	DF	(Slovenia) SLO	Žan Kolmanič	30	0	5+20	0	0+2	0	2+1	0
26	FW	(Liberia) LBR	Jimmy Farkarlun	0	0	0+0	0	0+0	0	0+0	0
29	DF	(Brazil) BRA	Guilherme Biro	39	3	31+1	3	2+0	0	3+2	0
30	GK	(United States) USA	Stefan Cleveland	1	0	0+0	0	0+0	0	1+0	0
32	MF	(United States) USA	Micah Burton	0	0	0+0	0	0+0	0	0+0	0
33	MF	(United States) USA	Owen Wolff	41	7	31+3	7	2+0	0	4+1	0
35	DF	(Serbia) SRB	Mateja Djordjevic	5	0	4+0	0	0+0	0	1+0	0
38	MF	(United States) USA	Ervin Torres	1	0	0+1	0	0+0	0	0+0	0

- Last updated: November 2, 2025
- Source: https://www.austinfc.com/stats/

=== Top scorers ===
Rank	Position	Number	Name	MLS	MLS Cup	USOC	Total
1	FW	9	(United States) Brandon Vázquez	5	0	4	9
1	FW	10	(Albania) Myrto Uzuni	6	0	3	9
3	MF	33	(United States) Owen Wolff	7	0	0	7
4	FW	11	(Ghana) Osman Bukari	3	0	2	5
5	DF	29	(Brazil) Guilherme Biro	3	0	0	3
6	MF	6	(Spain) Ilie Sánchez	1	0	1	2
6	MF	8	(Venezuela) Daniel Pereira	1	1	0	2
6	DF	17	(Republic of Ireland) Jon Gallagher	1	1	0	2
6	FW	19	(Republic of Ireland) CJ Fodrey	1	0	1	2
6	FW	21	(Chile) Diego Rubio	2	0	0	2
10	DF	3	(Denmark) Mikkel Desler	0	0	1	1
10	DF	5	(Ukraine) Oleksandr Svatok	1	0	0	1
10	MF	14	(Sweden) Besard Šabović	1	0	0	1
10	MF	16	(Finland) Robert Taylor	1	0	0	1
10	DF	23	(Slovenia) Žan Kolmanič	1	0	0	1
Own goal				2	0	0	2
Total				36	2	12	50

- Last updated: November 2, 2025
- Source: https://www.austinfc.com/stats/

=== Top assists ===
Rank	Position	Number	Name	MLS	MLS Cup	USOC	Total
1	MF	33	(United States) Owen Wolff	8	1	3	12
2	FW	11	(Ghana) Osman Bukari	5	0	1	6
3	FW	10	(Albania) Myrto Uzuni	4	0	0	4
3	FW	21	(United States) Diego Rubio	4	0	0	4
5	DF	3	(Denmark) Mikkel Desler	2	0	1	3
5	MF	8	(Venezuela) Daniel Pereira	3	0	0	3
5	DF	17	(Republic of Ireland) Jon Gallagher	2	0	1	3
8	DF	23	(Slovenia) Žan Kolmanič	2	0	0	2
9	DF	4	(United States) Brendan Hines-Ike	1	0	0	1
9	MF	6	(Spain) Ilie Sánchez	0	0	1	1
9	FW	7	(Colombia) Jáder Obrian	1	0	0	1
9	FW	9	(United States) Brandon Vázquez	0	0	1	1
9	FW	19	(United States) CJ Fodrey	1	0	0	1
9	MF	20	(Argentina) Nicolás Dubersarsky	0	0	1	1
9	DF	29	(Brazil) Guilherme Biro	0	0	1	1
Total				34	1	7	41

- Last updated: November 2, 2025
- Source: https://www.austinfc.com/stats/

=== Clean sheets ===
Rank	Number	Name	MLS	MLS Cup	USOC	Total
1	1	(United States) Brad Stuver	9	0	0	9
Total			9	0	0	9

- Last updated: November 2, 2025
- Source: https://www.austinfc.com/stats/

=== Disciplinary record ===
No.	Pos.	Player	MLS			MLS Cup			USOC			Total		
No.	Pos.	Player	Yellow card	(yellow card) (yellow-red card)	Red card	Yellow card	(yellow card) (yellow-red card)	Red card	Yellow card	(yellow card) (yellow-red card)	Red card	Yellow card	(yellow card) (yellow-red card)	Red card
1	GK	(United States) Brad Stuver	3	0	0	0	0	0	0	0	0	3	0	0
3	DF	(Denmark) Mikkel Desler	4	0	0	0	0	0	1	0	0	5	0	0
4	DF	(United States) Brendan Hines-Ike	2	1	0	1	0	0	2	0	0	5	1	0
5	DF	(Ukraine) Oleksandr Svatok	5	0	0	1	0	0	1	0	0	7	0	0
6	MF	(Spain) Ilie Sánchez	7	0	0	2	0	0	1	0	0	10	0	0
7	FW	(Colombia) Jáder Obrian	4	0	0	0	0	0	1	0	0	5	0	0
8	MF	(Venezuela) Daniel Pereira	8	0	0	0	0	0	2	0	0	10	0	0
9	FW	(United States) Brandon Vázquez	3	0	0	0	0	0	0	0	0	3	0	0
10	FW	(Albania) Myrto Uzuni	2	0	0	0	0	0	0	0	0	2	0	0
11	MF	(Ghana) Osman Bukari	2	0	0	0	0	0	1	0	0	3	0	0
14	MF	(Sweden) Besard Šabović	7	0	0	0	0	0	1	0	0	8	0	0
16	MF	(Finland) Robert Taylor	1	0	0	0	0	0	0	0	0	1	0	0
17	DF	(Republic of Ireland) Jon Gallagher	3	0	0	0	0	0	0	0	0	3	0	0
18	CB	(Costa Rica) Julio Cascante	1	0	0	0	0	0	1	0	1	2	0	1
19	MF	(United States) CJ Fodrey	0	0	0	0	0	0	1	0	0	1	0	0
20	MF	(Argentina) Nicolás Dubersarsky	2	0	0	0	0	0	0	0	0	2	0	0
21	FW	(Chile) Diego Rubio	3	0	0	0	0	0	0	0	0	3	0	0
23	LB	(Slovenia) Žan Kolmanič	2	0	0	1	0	0	0	0	0	3	0	0
26	WG	(Liberia) Jimmy Farkarlun	0	0	0	0	0	0	0	0	0	0	0	0
29	DF	(Brazil) Guilherme Biro	6	0	0	0	0	0	0	0	0	6	0	0
30	GK	(United States) Stefan Cleveland	0	0	0	0	0	0	0	0	0	0	0	0
32	MF	(United States) Micah Burton	0	0	0	0	0	0	0	0	0	0	0	0
33	MF	(United States) Owen Wolff	5	0	0	1	0	0	3	0	0	9	0	0
35	DF	(Serbia) Mateja Djordjevic	2	0	0	0	0	0	0	0	0	2	0	0
38	MF	(United States) Ervin Torres	0	0	0	0	0	0	0	0	0	0	0	0
Total			58	1	0	6	0	0	13	0	1	77	1	1

- Last updated: November 2, 2025
- Source: https://www.austinfc.com/stats/

== Awards and honors ==
=== MLS All Star Team ===
Award	Awardee	Position	Ref
MLS All-Star Team	(United States) Brad Stuver	GK	
MLS All-Star Team	(United States) Brandon Vázquez (Note: Injured prior to All-Star Game being played)	FW	
MLS All-Star Team	(Brazil) Guilherme Biro	DF	

=== End-of-season awards ===
Award	Winner	Ref
Defensive Player of the Year	(United States) Brad Stuver	
Offensive Player of the Year	(United States) Owen Wolff	

=== MLS Team of the Matchday ===
Matchday	Player	Opponent	Position	Ref
4	(Republic of Ireland) Jon Gallagher	Los Angeles FC	DF	
5	(United States) Owen Wolff	San Diego FC	MF	
7	(United States) Brad Stuver	Portland Timbers	Bench	
9	(United States) Owen Wolff (2)	LA Galaxy	Bench	
13	(United States) Brandon Vázquez	Atlanta United FC	Bench	
15	(Slovenia) Žan Kolmanič	Minnesota United FC	DF	
16	(Chile) Diego Rubio	Real Salt Lake	Bench	
19	(Brazil) Guilherme Biro	New York Red Bulls	DF	
24	(United States) Brad Stuver (2)	New England Revolution	GK	
25	(Albania) Myrto Uzuni	LA Galaxy	FW	
27	(United States) Owen Wolff (3)	D.C. United	MF	
27	(Ghana) Osman Bukari	D.C. United	Bench	
28	(Brazil) Guilherme Biro (2)	Houston Dynamo	Bench	
29	(United States) Owen Wolff (4)	FC Dallas	Bench	
31	(United States) Owen Wolff (5)	San Jose Earthquakes	MF	
31	(Ghana) Osman Bukari (2)	San Jose Earthquakes	Bench	
33	(United States) Brad Stuver (3)	Seattle Sounders FC	GK	
33	(Albania) Myrto Uzuni (2)	Seattle Sounders FC	Bench	
