= 2026 Austin FC season =

Austin FC
2026 season
- Chairman: Anthony Precourt
- Head coach: Nico Estévez (until May 18); Davy Arnaud (interim, from May 18)
- Stadium: Q2 Stadium
- MLS: 14th, Western Conference
- MLS Cup playoffs: DNQ
- U.S. Open Cup: Round of 32
- Leagues Cup: Quarterfinals
- Top goalscorer: League: Christian Ramirez; Myrto Uzuni (9 goals); All: Myrto Uzuni (13 goals)
- Highest home attendance: 20,738
- Average home league attendance: 20,738
- Biggest win: ATX 2–0 HOU (4/25) (MLS); ATX 2–0 St. Louis City SC (5/2) (MLS); ATX 3–1 Seattle Sounders FC (7/22) (MLS); ATX 3–0 Puebla (8/9) (LC)
- Biggest defeat: LOU 2–1 ATX (4/16) (USOC); SD 5–0 ATX (5/13) (MLS); ATX 0–2 TOL (8/26) (LC)
| Home colors | Away colors | Third colors |
- All statistics correct as of 20:07, November 1, 2026 (UTC).

The 2026 season is Austin FC's sixth season in Major League Soccer, the top flight of soccer in the United States. They play in the league's Western Conference. In addition the MLS play, Austin also competed in the U.S. Open Cup and Leagues Cup.

== Background ==
Austin FC started playing in the MLS Western Conference in 2021, finishing in 12th place with a record of 9W-4D-21L. 2022 brought many new experiences for Austin FC. They lost their first ever U.S. Open Cup match against San Antonio FC in extra time, won their first derby trophy, the Copa Tejas, and qualified for their first-ever MLS Cup Playoffs in just their second season as a franchise. Austin FC advanced to the Western Conference Finals but lost to LAFC. Austin FC fell almost all the way to the bottom of the 2023 standings, with the team finishing in 27th place in Major League Soccer. The new sporting director Rodolfo Borrell was quoted as saying "The team overachieved last year, the team underachieved this year", but showed his support for coach Josh Wolff as the team looks to rebuild for the 2024 season. At the end of the 2024 season, and after back-back seasons without reaching the MLS playoffs, Austin FC release their first ever coach Josh Wolff, having an interim coach for the final game of the season. In November 2024, Austin announced Nico Estévez as the second coach for the franchise. 2025 saw Austin advance to the finals of the 2025 U.S. Open Cup, falling to Nashville SC 2–1 at home, and one month later qualify for their second every MLS Cup playoffs, before falling in the first round to Los Angeles FC.

== Summary ==
=== Pre-season ===
Prior to the completion of the 2025 MLS playoffs, Austin FC announced they would participate in the 2026 Coachella Valley Invitational, the third year in a row participating in this pre-season tournament. On November 24, 2025, Austin announced they had signed Ervin Torres to a homegrown contract through the 2028 season with two one-year options. He becomes the third player from the Austin FC Academy to sign a homegrown contract. One day later, Austin announced their end–of–season roster decisions. The club denied the options for Julio Cascante, Jimmy Farkarlun, and Diego Rubio while exercising the options for Stefan Cleveland, Dani Pereira, and Riley Thomas. Brendan Hines-Ike's option was automatically trigger based on performance statistics from the 2025 season. Austin also signed Ilie Sánchez to a new contract for the 2026 season with a one-year option. With these decisions, Austin is left with two open slots on the senior roster as they build for the 2026 Major League Soccer season.

On December 10, 2025, Austin traded Stefan Cleveland to Sporting Kansas City for $50,000 in 2026 GAM. Austin then signed free agent Jon Bell through June 2028, with an option for the 2028–29 season. On December 18, Austin traded $700,000 in 2026 GAM, $550,000 in 2027 GAM, and their 2026 MLS SuperDraft first-round pick to Vancouver Whitecaps FC for Canadian international Jayden Nelson. After trading their first-round pick in the 2026 MLS SuperDraft, Austin selected Stefan Dobrijevic from the University of Akron in the second round and Patrick Cayelli from the University of Pennsylvania in the third round.

On December 19, Austin announced they had traded Osman Bukari to Widzew Łódź for a reported $6.5 million, which is an Ekstraklasa record transfer fee. On December 23, Austin announced the signing of Honduran international defender Joseph Rosales in a trade with Minnesota United FC. On January 23, 2026, Austin announced the signing of their third Designated Player, Uruguayan winger Facundo Torres. Torres signed through June 2030, with a one-year option. On January 27, Austin announced exercised a contract buy–out for Jáder Obrian. This move opens up both an international slot and senior team slot.

=== Early season ===
Austin began the season with a home game against Minnesota United. With two new players in the attack, Austin was able to score two goals in their first match. Hines-Ike got the first goal of the season with a strong header on a corner served up by new attacker Torres. Later in the second half Uzuni knocked in a one on the goal–line after a headed pass by Gallgher. Picking up from the 2025 season Austin relied on Stuver making a couple of great saves to keep the game close, but ultimately gave up the tying goal in the 90th minute after a defensive breakdown. On February 27, Austin FC acquired Christian Ramirez from MLS waivers, signing him through the 2026 season. Austin next hosted D.C. United in a match that remained even until the 82nd minute when new signing Ramirez put in a headed goal to take a 1–0 lead, which was all that Austin needed to secure the win. Austin first away game of the season was against Charlotte FC, where Guilherme Biro earned a red card in the 29th minute. After the red card, Charlotte took control of the match, resulting in a 1–3 loss from Austin. With Austin suffering from a rash of injuries, they travelled to Real Salt Lake, keeping the game tied until the 88th minute, when they went down 1–2. Jon Bell scored his first goal, heading in a set-piece from Facundo Torres. Minutes later Salt Lake equalized on an own goal by Oleksandr Svatok. After two consecutive losses on the road, Austin returned home, earning a 0–0 draw against LAFC through staunch defense. Austin FC visited Inter Miami for the first match in Nu Stadium, earning a 2–2 draw. Guilherme Biro became the first MLS player to score at Nu stadium in the sixth minute, with Jayden Nelson adding the second in the second half. Austin returned home to face LA Galaxy, falling 1–2. Uzuni scored his second of the season, the only goal of the match for Austin. Austin travelled to Toronto FC in their next match, achieving their strongest offensive match of the season, drawing 3–3 on goals from Bell, Torres, and Ramirez. Facing a mid–week game, Austin had to make adjustments due to Uzuni and Nelson nursing injuries. They travelled to San Jose Earthquakes, falling 5–1 in a match that saw Rosales score his first of the season and Stuver tie his single game save record of 11 saves. In their first Copa Tejas match of the year, Austin faced Houston Dynamo FC at home, earining a 2–0 win on goals from Nelson and Uzuni.

=== Mid-season ===
To start the month of May, Austin earned a 2–0 win over St. Louis City SC at Q2 stadium. Goals were scored my Nelson and Uzuni, with Stuver earning his fourth shut-out of the year. The match also say the return of Perriera, Vazquez, and Wolff. After two home wins in a row, Austin travelled to Minnesota United FC, earning a 2–2 draw on goals from Uzuni and Ramirez. Austin had their second away match in 72 hours at San Diego FC, falling 5–0 in the worse lost in club history. Austin returned home after their mid-week loss to face the last place team in the Western Conference, Sporting Kansas City. Austin took a late first half lead on a volley by Mikkel Desler, but failed to maintain the lead and lost 1–2 on two late game goals by Kansas City. Two days later, Austin announced the release of both their sporing director Rodolfo Borrell and manager Nico Estévez. Davy Arnaud will lead the team on an iterim basis for the last match before the 60-day FIFA break. Austin will work to find a new manager during that time. Austin closed out the pre-FIFA break with third lose in a row, falling 0–3 to St. Louis City FC, falling to 14th in the Western Conference. On June 8, Austin announced the hiring of Jim Curtin as the new head coach. Curtin will take over at the beginning of the 2027 season, with Davy Arnaud remaining the interim manager through the completion of the 2026 season. On June 16, Austin announced the club would exercise their buyout option of Robert Taylor and changes to the coaching staff, including bringing Terry Boss back as an assistant head coach and the release of assistant coach Nico Bosch. On July 30, Austin announced the signing of Przemysław Płacheta as a free agent. Płacheta spent the last two seasons at Oxford United. On July 2, Austin announced Daniel Pereira had been traded to CF Montréal for $2.35 million GAM. Austin will receive $1.4 million GAM for 2026, $700,000 GAM for 2027, and $250,000 conditional GAM. Pereira was Austin's first draft pick ever and appeared in 165 matches between 2021 and 2026.

== Management team ==
| Position | Name |
|---|---|
| Chairman | (United States) Anthony Precourt |
| Chief Soccer Officer and Sporting Director | (Sweden) Khaled El-Ahmad |
| Head coach | (United States) Davy Arnaud (interim) |
| Assistant coach | (Spain) Alberto González |
| Assistant coach | (United States) Terry Boss |
| Goalkeeping Coach | Fabio Hernandaz |

== Roster ==
As of November 7, 2026.

| No. | Name | Nationality | Position(s) | Date of birth (age) | Signed in | Previous club | Apps | Goals |
Goalkeepers
| 1 | Brad Stuver | (United States) | GK | April 16, 1991 (age 35) | 2020 | (United States) New York City FC | 33 | 0 |
| 12 | Damian Las | (United States) | GK | April 11, 2002 (age 24) | 2022 | (England) Fulham F.C. | 6 | 0 |
Defenders
| 2 | Riley Thomas | (United States) | DF | March 15, 2002 (age 24) | 2025 | (United States) Austin FC II | 1 | 0 |
| 3 | Mikkel Desler | (Denmark) | DF | February 19, 1995 (age 31) | 2024 | (France) Toulouse FC | 25 | 1 |
| 4 | Brendan Hines-Ike | (United States) | DF | November 30, 1994 (age 31) | 2024 | (United States) D.C. United | 31 | 2 |
| 5 | Oleksandr Svatok | (Ukraine) | CB | September 27, 1994 (age 32) | 2024 | (Ukraine) SC Dnipro-1 | 32 | 1 |
| 15 | Jon Bell | (Jamaica) | DF | August 26, 1997 (age 29) | 2026 | (United States) Seattle Sounders | 24 | 2 |
| 17 | Jon Gallagher | (Republic of Ireland) | LB/RB | February 23, 1996 (age 30) | 2020 | (United States) Atlanta United FC | 37 | 1 |
| 22 | Chris Applewhite | (United States) | LB/RB | August 23, 2007 (age 19) | 2026 | (United States) Nashville SC | 0 | 0 |
| 23 | Žan Kolmanič | (Slovenia) | LB | March 3, 2000 (age 26) | 2021 | (Slovenia) Maribor | 21 | 0 |
| 29 | Guilherme Biro | (Brazil) | LB | May 2, 2000 (age 26) | 2024 | (Brazil) Mirassol | 34 | 3 |
| 35 | Mateja Djordjevic (U22) (Note: U22 initiative) | (Serbia) | DF | July 17, 2003 (age 23) | 2025 | (Serbia) FK TSC | 10 | 0 |
Midfielders
| 6 | Ilie Sánchez | (Spain) | MF | November 21, 1990 (age 35) | 2025 | (United States) Los Angeles FC | 32 | 1 |
| 14 | Besard Šabović | (Sweden) | MF | January 5, 1998 (age 28) | 2025 | (Sweden) Djurgårdens | 34 | 0 |
| 24 | Jorge Alastuey | (Spain) | MF | May 14, 2003 (age 23) | 2026 | (United States) Austin FC II | 20 | 1 |
| 30 | Joseph Rosales | (Honduras) | DF | November 6, 2000 (age 26) | 2026 | (United States) Minnesota United | 35 | 2 |
| 32 | Micah Burton (HG) | (United States) | MF | March 26, 2006 (age 20) | 2024 | (United States) Austin FC II | 4 | 0 |
| 38 | Ervin Torres (HG) | (United States) | MF | November 14, 2007 (age 18) | 2025 | (United States) Austin FC II | 24 | 2 |
| | Nicolás Dubersarsky (U22) | (Argentina) | MF | December 21, 2004 (age 21) | 2025 | (Argentina) Instituto | 12 | 0 |
| | Daniel Pereira (GA) | (Venezuela) | MF | July 14, 2000 (age 26) | 2021 | (United States) Virginia Tech Hokies | 9 | 0 |
| | Owen Wolff (U22) | (United States) | MF | December 30, 2004 (age 21) | 2020 | (United States) Austin FC Academy | 10 | 0 |
Forward
| 9 | Brandon Vázquez | (United States) | FW | October 14, 1998 (age 28) | 2025 | (Mexico) C.F. Monterrey | 26 | 3 |
| 10 | Myrto Uzuni (DP) | (Albania) | FW | May 31, 1995 (age 31) | 2025 | (Spain) Granada | 30 | 13 |
| 11 | Facundo Torres | (Uruguay) | FW | April 13, 2000 (age 26) | 2026 | (Brazil) Palmeiras | 37 | 4 |
| 21 | Christian Rameriz | (United States) | FW | April 4, 1991 (age 35) | 2026 | (United States) LA Galaxy | 33 | 9 |
| 77 | Przemysław Płacheta | (Poland) | FW | March 23, 1998 (age 28) | 2026 | (England) Oxford United | 19 | 0 |
| | Jayden Nelson | (Canada) | FW | September 26, 2002 (age 24) | 2026 | (Canada) Vancouver Whitecaps FC | 15 | 2 |
| | CJ Fodrey (GA) | (United States) | FW | February 10, 2004 (age 22) | 2023 | (United States) San Diego State | 15 | 1 |

== Transfers ==
=== In ===
| Date | Position | No. | Name | From | Fee | Ref. |
|---|---|---|---|---|---|---|
| December 16, 2025 | DF | 15 | (Jamaica) Jon Bell | (United States) Seattle Sounders | Free Agent | |
| December 18, 2025 | FW | 7 | (Canada) Jayden Nelson | (Canada) Vancouver Whitecaps | $700,000 in 2026 GAM $550,000 in 2027 GAM; 1st-round pick in 2026 MLS SuperDraft | |
| December 18, 2025 | DF | 30 | (Honduras) Joseph Rosales | (United States) Minnesota United | $1.5 million cash trade | |
| January 23, 2026 | MF | 11 | (Uruguay) Facundo Torres | (Brazil) SE Palmeiras | $9.5 million cash trade | |
| February 27, 2026 | FW | 21 | (United States) Christian Ramirez | (United States) LA Galaxy | free | |
| June 30, 2026 | FW | 77 | (Poland) Przemysław Płacheta | (England) Oxford United | free | |
| July 30, 2026 | FW | 24 | (Spain) Jorge Alastuey | (United States) Austin FC II | free | |

=== Loan in ===
| No. | Pos. | Player | Loaned from | Start | End | Source |
|---|---|---|---|---|---|---|
| 24 | MF | (Spain) Jorge Alastuey | (United States) Austin FC II | March 13, 2026; March 20, 2026; April 22, 2026 | March 16, 2026; March 23, 2026; April 25, 2026 | |
| 22 | DF | (United States) Chris Applewhite | (United States) Nashville SC | September 2, 2026 | June 30, 2027 | |
| | MF | (United States) Patrick Cayelli | (United States) Austin FC II | September 26, 2026 | September 29, 2026 | |
| | FW | (United States) Stefan Dobrijevic | (United States) Austin FC II | September 26, 2026; October 31, 2026 | September 29, 2026; November 3, 2026 | |
| | GK | (United States) Erik Lauta | (United States) Austin FC II | September 26, 2026 | September 29, 2026 | |

=== Out ===
| Date | Position | No. | Name | To | Type | Fee | Ref. |
|---|---|---|---|---|---|---|---|
| November 25, 2025 | DF | 18 | (Costa Rica) Julio Cascante | (Australia) Melbourne City FC | Declined contract option | N/A | |
| November 25, 2025 | FW | 26 | (Liberia) Jimmy Farkarlun | (United States) El Paso Locomotive | Declined contract option | N/A | |
| November 25, 2025 | FW | 21 | (Chile) Diego Rubio | (Chile) Deportes La Serena | Declined contract option | N/A | |
| December 10, 2025 | GK | 30 | (United States) Stefan Cleveland | (United States) Sporting Kansas City | Trade | $50,000 in 2026 GAM | |
| December 19, 2025 | FW | 11 | (Ghana) Osman Bukari | (Poland) Widzew Łódź | Trade | $6.5 million | |
| January 27, 2026 | FW | 7 | (Colombia) Jáder Obrian | (Colombia) Santa Fe | Contract buy–out | N/A | |
| June 16, 2026 | MF | 16 | (Finland) Robert Taylor | (United States) LA Galaxy | Contract buy–out | N/A | |
| July 2, 2026 | MF | 8 | (Venezuela) Daniel Pereira | (Canada) CF Montréal | Transfer | $2.35 million GAM | |
| August 26, 2026 | MF | 33 | (United States) Owen Wolff | (United States) Sporting Kansas City | Transfer | $4.5 million guaranteed + $3.1 performance–based | |
| August 26, 2026 | FW | 7 | (Canada) Jayden Nelson | (England) Bolton Wanderers | Transfer | $1.1 million guaranteed + $1.25 performance–based | |

=== Loan out ===
| No. | Pos. | Player | Loaned to | Start | End | Source |
|---|---|---|---|---|---|---|
| 2 | DF | (United States) Riley Thomas | (United States) Austin FC II | February 27 | December 31 | |
| 12 | GK | (United States) Damian Las | (United States) Austin FC II | February 27 | December 31 | |
| 19 | FW | (United States) CJ Fodrey | (United States) Austin FC II | February 27 | December 31 | |
| 32 | MF | (United States) Micah Burton | (United States) Austin FC II | February 27 | December 31 | |
| 38 | MF | (United States) Ervin Torres | (United States) Austin FC II | February 27 | December 31 | |
| 24 | MF | (Argentina) Nicolás Dubersarsky | (Argentina) Tigre | July 30, 2026 | June 30, 2027 | |
| 19 | FW | (United States) CJ Fodrey | (Scotland) Falkirk | August 26, 2026 | June 30, 2027 | |

=== MLS Re-Entry Draft picks ===
2024 Austin FC Re-Entry Picks
| Round | Selection | Player | Position | Team | Notes | Ref. |
| 1 | 17 | PASS | | | | |
| 2 | 17 (47) | PASS | | | | |

=== MLS SuperDraft picks ===
2025 Austin FC SuperDraft Picks
| Round | Selection | Player | Position | College | Notes | Ref. |
| 1 | 17 | | | | Traded to Vancouver Whitecaps FC for Jayden Nelson. | |
| 2 | 17 (47) | (United States) Stefan Dobrijevic | FW | University of Akron | Signed with Austin FC II on February 6, 2026 | |
| 3 | 17 (77) | (United States) Patrick Cayelli | MF | University of Pennsylvania | Signed with Austin FC II on February 6, 2026 | |

=== New contracts ===
| Date | Pos. | No. | Player | Contract until | Ref. |
|---|---|---|---|---|---|
| November 25, 2025 | MF | 6 | (Spain) Ilie Sánchez | 2026 + 1yr option | |
| January 5, 2025 | MF | 33 | (United States) Owen Wolff | June 2030 | |
| January 9, 2025 | MF | 8 | (Venezuela) Daniel Pereira | June 2028 + 1yr option | |
| January 14, 2025 | DF | 17 | (Republic of Ireland) Jon Gallagher | June 2027 + 1yr option | |
| October 16, 2025 | FW | 21 | (United States) Christian Ramirez | June 2028 | |

== Non-competitive fixtures ==
=== Preseason ===
| Win | Draw | Loss |

| Date | Opponent | Venue | Location | Result | Scorer(s) | Attendance | Notes |
|---|---|---|---|---|---|---|---|
| January 24 | San Antonio FC | St. David's Performance Center | Austin, Texas | 0–0 | – | 0 | Closed game |
| January 28 | Louisville City FC | St. David's Performance Center | Austin, Texas | 1–0 | Alastuey '60 | 0 | Closed game |
| February 1 | New York City FC | Q2 Stadium | Austin, Texas | 0–2 | – | TBA | – |
| February 7 | St. Louis City SC | Coachella Valley Invitational | Indio, California | 0–1 | – | N/A | – |
| February 11 | Chicago Fire FC | Coachella Valley Invitational | Indio, California | 2–2 | Taylor '27 Nelson '65 | N/A | – |
| February 14 | Sporting Kansas City | Coachella Valley Invitational | Indio, California | 0–2 | – | N/A | – |

=== Mid-season ===
| Win | Draw | Loss |

| Date | Opponent | Venue | Location | Result | Scorer(s) | Attendance |
|---|---|---|---|---|---|---|
| July 3 | (Mexico) Querétaro F.C. | St. David's Performance Center | Austin, Texas | 0–1 | | Closed door |
| July 8 | Sporting Club Jacksonville | St. David's Performance Center | Austin, Texas | 4–0 | Torres; Rosales; Gallagher; Own Goal | Closed door |
| July 15 | Charlotte FC | Q2 Stadium | Austin, Texas | | | |

== Competitive fixtures ==
=== Overall record ===
| Competition | First match | Last match | Starting round | Final position | Record | | | | | | | |
| Competition | First match | Last match | Starting round | Final position | Pld | W | D | L | GF | GA | GD | Win % |
|---|---|---|---|---|---|---|---|---|---|---|---|---|
| MLS regular season | February 21 | November 7 | Matchday 1 | 14th Western Conference | 34 | 8 | 10 | 16 | 42 | 65 | −23 | 23.53 |
| U.S. Open Cup | April 14 | April 14 | Round of 32 | Round of 32 | 1 | 0 | 0 | 1 | 1 | 2 | −1 | 0.00 |
| 2026 Leagues Cup | August 4 | August 26 | Phase One | Quarterfinals | 4 | 2 | 1 | 1 | 6 | 3 | +3 | 50.00 |
| Total | | | | | 39 | 10 | 11 | 18 | 49 | 70 | −21 | 25.64 |

Last updated: November 7, 2026
Source: Soccerway

=== Major League Soccer Regular Season ===
==== Standings ====
===== Western Conference =====
MLS Western Conference table (2026)
| Pos | Team | Pld | W | L | T | GF | GA | GD | Pts |
|---|---|---|---|---|---|---|---|---|---|
| 11 | LA Galaxy | 34 | 11 | 12 | 11 | 50 | 57 | −7 | 44 |
| 12 | Colorado Rapids | 34 | 12 | 15 | 7 | 47 | 50 | −3 | 43 |
| 13 | San Diego FC | 34 | 9 | 14 | 11 | 57 | 63 | −6 | 38 |
| 14 | Austin FC | 34 | 8 | 16 | 10 | 42 | 65 | −23 | 34 |
| 15 | Sporting Kansas City | 34 | 7 | 22 | 5 | 40 | 81 | −41 | 26 |

Source: MLS
Rules for classification: 1) points; 2) total wins; 3) total goal differential; 4) total goals scored; 5) fewer disciplinary points; 6) away goal differential; 7) away goals scored; 8) home goals differential; 9) home goals scored; 10) coin toss (2 clubs tied) or drawing of lots (≥3 clubs tied)

===== Overall =====
Overall MLS standings table
| Pos | Team | Pld | W | L | T | GF | GA | GD | Pts |
|---|---|---|---|---|---|---|---|---|---|
| 24 | Toronto FC | 34 | 9 | 13 | 12 | 52 | 67 | −15 | 39 |
| 25 | San Diego FC | 34 | 9 | 14 | 11 | 57 | 63 | −6 | 38 |
| 26 | Austin FC | 34 | 8 | 16 | 10 | 42 | 65 | −23 | 34 |
| 27 | Atlanta United FC | 34 | 9 | 19 | 6 | 43 | 60 | −17 | 33 |
| 28 | D.C. United | 34 | 7 | 15 | 12 | 39 | 61 | −22 | 33 |

Source: MLS
Rules for classification: 1) points; 2) total wins; 3) total goal differential; 4) total goals scored; 5) fewer disciplinary points; 6) away goal differential; 7) away goals scored; 8) home goals differential; 9) home goals scored; 10) coin toss (2 clubs tied) or drawing of lots (≥3 clubs tied)

==== Matches ====
| Win | Draw | Loss |

| Matchday | Date | Opponent | Venue | Location | Result (Note: Austin FC's score written first) | Scorers | Attendance | Referee | Position |
|---|---|---|---|---|---|---|---|---|---|
| 1 | February 21 | Minnesota United FC | Q2 Stadium | Austin, Texas | 2–2 | Hines-Ike 7'; Uzuni 76' | 20,738 | Armando Villarreal | 9th, Western Conference |
| 2 | March 1 | D.C. United | Q2 Stadium | Austin, Texas | 1–0 | Ramirez 82' | 20,738 | Lorenzo Hernandez | 6th, Western Conference |
| 3 | March 7 | Charlotte FC | Bank of America Stadium | Charlotte, North Carolina | 1–3 | Agyemang 31' (o.g.) | 35,611 | Rosendo Mendoza | 11th, Western Conference |
| 4 | March 14 | Real Salt Lake | America First Field | Sandy, Utah | 1–2 | Bell 18' | 20,751 | Elijio Arreguin | 11th, Western Conference |
| 5 | March 21 | Los Angeles FC | Q2 Stadium | Austin, Texas | 0–0 | | 20,738 | Rubiel Vazquez | 11th, Western Conference |
| 6 | April 4 | Inter Miami CF | Nu Stadium | Miami, Florida | 2–2 | Biro 6'; Nelson 53' | 26,412 | Allen Chapman | 11th, Western Conference |
| 7 | April 11 | LA Galaxy | Q2 Stadium | Austin, Texas | 1–2 | Uzuni 85' | 20,738 | Tori Penso | 13th, Western Conference |
| 8 | April 18 | Toronto FC | BMO Field | Toronto, Canada | 3–3 | Bell 29'; F. Torres 78'; Ramirez 82' | 16,550 | Drew Fischer | 13th, Western Conference |
| 9 | April 22 | San Jose Earthquakes | PayPal Park | San Jose, California | 1–5 | Rosales 9' | 12,276 | Timothy Ford | 13th, Western Conference |
| 10 | April 25; Copa Tejas | Houston Dynamo FC | Q2 Stadium | Austin, Texas | 2–0 | Nelson 13'; Uzuni 45+2' | 20,738 | Alexis Da Silva | 13th, Western Conference |
| 11 | May 3 | St. Louis City SC | Q2 Stadium | Austin, Texas | 2–0 | Ramirez 69'; Uzuni 81' | 20,738 | Jon Freemon | 11th, Western Conference |
| 12 | May 10 | Minnesota United FC | Allianz Field | Saint Paul, Minnesota | 2–2 | Uzuni 14' (pen.); Ramirez 79' | 18,749 | Chris Penso | 10th, Western Conference |
| 13 | May 13 | San Diego FC | Snapdragon Stadium | San Diego, California | 0–5 | | 19,194 | Malik Badawi | 13th, Western Conference |
| 14 | May 16 | Sporting Kansas City | Q2 Stadium | Austin, Texas | 1–2 | Desler 45+1' | 20,738 | Marcos de Oliveira | 13th, Western Conference |
| 15 | May 23 | St. Louis City SC | Energizer Park | St. Louis, Missouri | 0–3 | | 22,423 | Pierre-Luc Lauziere | 14th, Western Conference |
| 16 | July 22 | Seattle Sounders FC | Q2 Stadium | Austin, Texas | 3–1 | Ilie 12'; Uzuni 86'; Ramírez 90+1' | 20,738 | Ricardo Montero | 14th, Western Conference |
| 17 | July 25; Copa Tejas | Houston Dynamo FC | Shell Energy Stadium | Houston, Texas | 0–3 | | 19,869 | Filip Dujic | 14th, Western Conference |
| 18 | August 1 | Colorado Rapids | Dick's Sporting Goods Park | Commerce City, Colorado | 0–1 | | 16,922 | Armando Villarreal | 14th, Western Conference |
| 19 | August 15; Copa Tejas | FC Dallas | Q2 Stadium | Austin, Texas | 1–2 | E. Torres 57' | 20,738 | Ramy Touchan | 14th, Western Conference |
| 20 | August 19 | Seattle Sounders FC | Lumen Field | Seattle, Washington | 2–1 | F. Torres 66'; Biro 87' | 28,836 | Allen Chapman | 14th, Western Conference |
| 21 | August 22 | Philadelphia Union | Q2 Stadium | Austin, Texas | 1–1 | Hines-Ike 21' | 20,738 | Rodrigo Albuquerque | 14th, Western Conference |
| 22 | August 29 | Portland Timbers | Providence Park | Portland, Oregon | 2–1 | F. Torres 25', Svatok 90+3' | 20,952 | Guido Gonzales Jr. | 14th, Western Conference |
| 23 | September 5 | San Jose Earthquakes | Q2 Stadium | Austin, Texas | 1–1 | Biro 90+7' | 20,738 | Sergii Boiko | 14th, Western Conference |
| 24 | September 9 | Colorado Rapids | Q2 Stadium | Austin, Texas | 1–1 | Torres 79' | 20,738 | Sergii Demianchuk | 14th, Western Conference |
| 25 | September 13 | Vancouver Whitecaps FC | BC Place | Vancouver, Canada | 2–1 | Ramirez 28', 60' | 23,855 | Victor Rivas | 13th, Western Conference |
| 26 | September 19; Copa Tejas | FC Dallas | Toyota Stadium | Frisco, Texas | 0–0 | | 10,925 | Allen Chapman | 11th, Western Conference |
| 27 | September 26 | San Diego FC | Q2 Stadium | Austin, Texas | 3–3 | Vázquez 73'; Ramirez 82', 86' | 20,738 | Jon Freemon | 13th, Western Conference |
| 28 | October 10 | Nashville SC | Q2 Stadium | Austin, Texas | 1–4 | Vázquez 76' | 20,738 | Ismail Elfath | 13th, Western Conference |
| 29 | October 14 | Los Angeles FC | BMO Stadium | Los Angeles, California | 1–3 | Vázquez 66' | 22,180 | Jair Marrufo | 14th, Western Conference |
| 30 | October 17 | Vancouver Whitecaps FC | Q2 Stadium | Austin, Texas | 1–2 | Uzuni 40' | 20,738 | Tori Penso | 14th, Western Conference |
| 31 | October 24 | Sporting Kansas City | Sporting Park | Kansas City, Kansas | 2–1 | Uzuni 64', 86' | 13,928 | Ricardo Fierro | 14th, Western Conference |
| 32 | October 28 | Real Salt Lake | Q2 Stadium | Austin, Texas | 1–2 | Alastuey 52' | 20,738 | Ricardo Montero | 14th, Western Conference |
| 33 | October 31 | LA Galaxy | Dignity Health Sports Park | Carson, California | 1–4 | Torres 54' | 17,238 | Lukasz Szpala | 14th, Western Conference |
| 34 | November 7 | Portland Timbers | Q2 Stadium | Austin, Texas | 0–2 | | 20,738 | Victor Rivas | 14th, Western Conference |

=== MLS Playoffs ===
Austin FC did not qualify for the 2026 MLS Cup playoffs with two games remaining in the season.

=== U.S. Open Cup ===
On December 4, 2025 U.S. Soccer announced Austin would take part in the 2026 U.S. Open Cup, entering in the Round of 32 along with all MLS teams participating in this iteration of the tournament. Austin travelled to Louisville City FC for the Round of 32 of the USOC. Austin fell 1–2 to the USL Championship team, with Austin's only goal scored by CJ Fodrey.

| Win | Draw | Loss |

| Matchday | Date | Opponent | Venue | Location | Result (Note: Austin FC's score written first) | Scorers | Attendance | Referee |
|---|---|---|---|---|---|---|---|---|
| Round of 32 | April 14 | Louisville City FC | Lynn Family Stadium | Louisville, Kentucky | 1–2 | Fodrey 70' | 6,023 | Calin Radosav |

=== Leagues Cup ===
On December 16, 2025, The Leagues Cup organizing committee announced the 36 teams taking part in the 2026 Leagues Cup. All eighteen Liga MX teams and the 18 MLS teams who qualified for the 2025 playoffs will participate in the tournament between August 4 and September 6, 2026.

==== Called up ====
| No. | Pos. | Player | Team | Source |
|---|---|---|---|---|
| 25 | DF | (France) Jules Bery | (United States) Austin FC II | |
| 26 | MF | (Ivory Coast) Djakaria Barro | (United States) Austin FC II | |
| 27 | FW | (Ghana) Ibrahima Sall | (United States) Austin FC II | |
| 39 | GK | (England) Charlie Farrar | (United States) Austin FC II | |

==== Matches ====
| Win | Draw | Loss |

| Matchday | Date | Opponent | Venue | Location | Result (Note: Austin FC's score written first) | Scorers | Attendance | Referee |
|---|---|---|---|---|---|---|---|---|
| Round One | August 6 | (Mexico) Tijuana | Q2 Stadium | Austin, Texas | 2–0 | Rosales 16'; Gallagher 45+2' | 20,738 | Reon Radix |
| Round One | August 9 | (Mexico) Puebla | Q2 Stadium | Austin, Texas | 3–0 | Uzuni 4', 7', 34' | | Jon Freemon |
| Round One | August 13 | (Mexico) América | Q2 Stadium | Austin, Texas | 1–1 (6–5 p) | Uzuni 67' | | Juan Gabriel Calderón |
| Quarterfinals | August 26 | (Mexico) Toluca | Sports Illustrated Stadium | Harrison, New Jersey | 0–2 | | 8,110 | Filip Dujic |

== Statistics ==
=== Appearances and goals ===
Numbers after plus–sign (+) denote appearances as a substitute.

| No. | Pos | Nat | Player | Total | | MLS | | USOC | | Leagues Cup | |
| No. | Pos | Nat | Player | Apps | Goals | Apps | Goals | Apps | Goals | Apps | Goals |
|---|---|---|---|---|---|---|---|---|---|---|---|
| 1 | GK | (United States) USA | Brad Stuver | 33 | 0 | 29+0 | 0 | 0+0 | 0 | 4+0 | 0 |
| 2 | DF | (United States) USA | Riley Thomas | 1 | 0 | 0+1 | 0 | 0+0 | 0 | 0+0 | 0 |
| 3 | DF | (Denmark) DEN | Mikkel Desler | 25 | 1 | 17+6 | 1 | 1+0 | 0 | 0+1 | 0 |
| 4 | DF | (United States) USA | Brendan Hines-Ike | 31 | 2 | 19+7 | 2 | 1+0 | 0 | 1+3 | 0 |
| 5 | DF | (Ukraine) UKR | Oleksandr Svatok | 32 | 1 | 23+4 | 1 | 0+1 | 0 | 4+0 | 0 |
| 6 | MF | (Spain) ESP | Ilie Sánchez | 32 | 1 | 21+7 | 1 | 0+0 | 0 | 3+1 | 0 |
| 9 | FW | (United States) USA | Brandon Vázquez | 26 | 3 | 14+8 | 3 | 0+0 | 0 | 2+2 | 0 |
| 10 | FW | (Albania) ALB | Myrto Uzuni | 30 | 13 | 22+3 | 9 | 1+0 | 0 | 4+0 | 4 |
| 11 | MF | (Uruguay) URU | Facundo Torres | 37 | 4 | 29+4 | 4 | 1+0 | 0 | 2+1 | 0 |
| 12 | GK | (United States) USA | Damian Las | 6 | 0 | 5+0 | 0 | 1+0 | 0 | 0+0 | 0 |
| 14 | MF | (Sweden) SWE | Besard Šabović | 34 | 0 | 16+13 | 0 | 0+1 | 0 | 3+1 | 0 |
| 15 | DF | (Jamaica) JAM | Jon Bell | 24 | 2 | 14+9 | 2 | 1+0 | 0 | 0+0 | 0 |
| 17 | FW | (Republic of Ireland) IRL | Jon Gallagher | 37 | 1 | 31+2 | 0 | 0+0 | 0 | 4+0 | 1 |
| 21 | FW | (United States) USA | Christian Ramirez | 33 | 9 | 17+13 | 9 | 0+0 | 0 | 2+1 | 0 |
| 23 | DF | (Slovenia) SLO | Žan Kolmanič | 21 | 0 | 5+14 | 0 | 0+1 | 0 | 0+1 | 0 |
| 24 | MF | (Spain) ESP | Jorge Alastuey | 20 | 1 | 12+5 | 1 | 0+0 | 0 | 0+3 | 0 |
| 29 | DF | (Brazil) BRA | Guilherme Biro | 34 | 3 | 26+3 | 3 | 1+0 | 0 | 4+0 | 0 |
| 30 | DF | (Honduras) HON | Joseph Rosales | 35 | 2 | 28+2 | 1 | 0+1 | 0 | 4+0 | 1 |
| 32 | MF | (United States) USA | Micah Burton | 4 | 0 | 2+2 | 0 | 0+0 | 0 | 0+0 | 0 |
| 35 | DF | (Serbia) SRB | Mateja Djordjevic | 10 | 0 | 2+5 | 0 | 1+0 | 0 | 2+0 | 0 |
| 38 | MF | (United States) USA | Ervin Torres | 24 | 2 | 14+6 | 2 | 0+0 | 0 | 4+0 | 0 |
| 77 | FW | (Poland) POL | Przemysław Płacheta | 19 | 0 | 3+13 | 0 | 0+0 | 0 | 0+3 | 0 |
| | MF | (Finland) FIN | Robert Taylor | 2 | 0 | 0+2 | 0 | 0+0 | 0 | 0+0 | 0 |
| | MF | (Venezuela) VEN | Daniel Pereira | 9 | 0 | 4+4 | 0 | 1+0 | 0 | 0+0 | 0 |
| | MF | (Argentina) ARG | Nicolás Dubersarsky | 12 | 0 | 7+4 | 0 | 1+0 | 0 | 0+0 | 0 |
| | FW | (Canada) CAN | Jayden Nelson | 15 | 2 | 7+6 | 2 | 1+0 | 0 | 0+1 | 0 |
| | MF | (United States) USA | CJ Fodrey | 15 | 1 | 3+11 | 0 | 0+1 | 1 | 0+0 | 0 |
| | MF | (United States) USA | Owen Wolff | 10 | 0 | 4+4 | 0 | 0+0 | 0 | 1+1 | 0 |

- Last updated: November 7, 2026
- Source: https://www.austinfc.com/stats/

=== Top scorers ===
| Rank | Position | Number | Name | MLS | USOC | Leagues Cup | Total |
|---|---|---|---|---|---|---|---|
| 1 | FW | 10 | (Albania) Myrto Uzuni | 9 | 0 | 4 | 13 |
| 2 | FW | 21 | (United States) Christian Ramirez | 9 | 0 | 0 | 9 |
| 3 | FW | 11 | (Uruguay) Facundo Torres | 4 | 0 | 0 | 4 |
| 4 | DF | 29 | (Brazil) Guilherme Biro | 3 | 0 | 0 | 3 |
| 4 | FW | 9 | (United States) Brandon Vázquez | 3 | 0 | 0 | 3 |
| 6 | DF | 4 | (United States) Brendan Hines-Ike | 2 | 0 | 0 | 2 |
| 6 | MF | 15 | (Jamaica) Jon Bell | 2 | 0 | 0 | 2 |
| 6 | MF | 30 | (Honduras) Joseph Rosales | 1 | 0 | 1 | 2 |
| 6 | MF | 38 | (United States) Ervin Torres | 2 | 0 | 0 | 2 |
| 6 | FW | | (Canada) Jayden Nelson | 2 | 0 | 0 | 2 |
| 11 | DF | 3 | (Denmark) Mikkel Desler | 1 | 0 | 0 | 1 |
| 11 | DF | 5 | (Ukraine) Oleksandr Svatok | 1 | 0 | 0 | 1 |
| 11 | MF | 6 | (Spain) Ilie Sánchez | 1 | 0 | 0 | 1 |
| 11 | DF | 17 | (Republic of Ireland) Jon Gallagher | 0 | 0 | 1 | 1 |
| 11 | MF | 24 | (Spain) Jorge Alastuey | 1 | 0 | 0 | 1 |
| 11 | FW | | (United States) CJ Fodrey | 0 | 1 | 0 | 1 |
| Own goal | | | | 1 | 0 | 0 | 1 |
| Total | | | | 42 | 1 | 6 | 49 |

- Last updated: November 8, 2026
- Source: https://www.austinfc.com/stats/

=== Top assists ===
| Rank | Position | Number | Name | MLS | USOC | Leagues Cup | Total |
|---|---|---|---|---|---|---|---|
| 1 | FW | 11 | (Uruguay) Facundo Torres | 8 | 0 | 1 | 9 |
| 2 | FW | 10 | (Albania) Myrto Uzuni | 6 | 0 | 1 | 7 |
| 3 | MF | 30 | (Honduras) Joseph Rosales | 5 | 1 | 0 | 6 |
| 3 | MF | 38 | (United States) Ervin Torres | 6 | 0 | 0 | 6 |
| 5 | DF | 17 | (Republic of Ireland) Jon Gallagher | 4 | 0 | 0 | 4 |
| 6 | MF | 14 | (Sweden) Besard Šabović | 3 | 0 | 0 | 3 |
| 6 | FW | 21 | (United States) Christian Ramirez | 2 | 0 | 1 | 3 |
| 6 | DF | 29 | (Brazil) Guilherme Biro | 3 | 0 | 0 | 3 |
| 9 | MF | 6 | (Spain) Ilie Sánchez | 2 | 0 | 0 | 2 |
| 9 | FW | 9 | (United States) Brandon Vázquez | 2 | 0 | 0 | 2 |
| 9 | DF | 23 | (Slovenia) Žan Kolmanič | 2 | 0 | 0 | 2 |
| 9 | MF | | (Finland) Robert Taylor | 2 | 0 | 0 | 2 |
| 13 | DF | 3 | (Denmark) Mikkel Desler | 1 | 0 | 0 | 1 |
| 13 | DF | 15 | (Jamaica) Jon Bell | 1 | 0 | 0 | 1 |
| 13 | MF | 24 | (Spain) Jorge Alastuey | 1 | 0 | 0 | 1 |
| 13 | MF | 32 | (United States) Micah Burton | 1 | 0 | 0 | 1 |
| 13 | MF | | (United States) Owen Wolff | 1 | 0 | 0 | 1 |
| 13 | MF | | (Venezuela) Daniel Pereira | 1 | 0 | 0 | 1 |
| 13 | FW | | (Canada) Jayden Nelson | 1 | 0 | 0 | 1 |
| Total | | | | 51 | 1 | 3 | 56 |

- Last updated: November 7, 2026
- Source: https://www.austinfc.com/stats/

=== Clean sheets ===
| Rank | Number | Name | MLS | USOC | Leagues Cup | Total |
|---|---|---|---|---|---|---|
| 1 | 1 | (United States) Brad Stuver | 5 | 0 | 2 | 7 |
| Total | | | 5 | 0 | 2 | 7 |

- Last updated: November 7, 2026
- Source: https://www.austinfc.com/stats/

=== Disciplinary record ===
| No. | Pos. | Player | MLS | | | USOC | | | Leagues Cup | | | Total | | |
| No. | Pos. | Player | Yellow card | (yellow card) (yellow-red card) | Red card | Yellow card | (yellow card) (yellow-red card) | Red card | Yellow card | (yellow card) (yellow-red card) | Red card | Yellow card | (yellow card) (yellow-red card) | Red card |
|---|---|---|---|---|---|---|---|---|---|---|---|---|---|---|
| 1 | GK | (United States) Brad Stuver | 2 | 0 | 0 | 0 | 0 | 0 | 0 | 0 | 0 | 2 | 0 | 0 |
| 3 | DF | (Denmark) Mikkel Desler | 5 | 0 | 0 | 0 | 0 | 0 | 0 | 0 | 0 | 5 | 0 | 0 |
| 4 | DF | (United States) Brendan Hines-Ike | 2 | 0 | 0 | 0 | 0 | 0 | 0 | 0 | 0 | 2 | 0 | 0 |
| 5 | DF | (Ukraine) Oleksandr Svatok | 3 | 0 | 0 | 0 | 0 | 0 | 2 | 0 | 0 | 3 | 0 | 0 |
| 6 | MF | (Spain) Ilie Sánchez | 5 | 0 | 0 | 0 | 0 | 0 | 0 | 0 | 1 | 5 | 0 | 1 |
| 9 | FW | (United States) Brandon Vázquez | 0 | 0 | 0 | 0 | 0 | 0 | 0 | 0 | 0 | 0 | 0 | 0 |
| 10 | FW | (Albania) Myrto Uzuni | 5 | 0 | 0 | 0 | 0 | 0 | 0 | 0 | 0 | 5 | 0 | 0 |
| 11 | MF | (Uruguay) Facundo Torres | 3 | 0 | 0 | 0 | 0 | 0 | 0 | 0 | 0 | 3 | 0 | 0 |
| 12 | GK | (United States) Damian Las | 1 | 0 | 0 | 0 | 0 | 0 | 0 | 0 | 0 | 1 | 0 | 0 |
| 14 | MF | (Sweden) Besard Šabović | 6 | 0 | 0 | 0 | 0 | 0 | 2 | 0 | 0 | 8 | 0 | 0 |
| 15 | DF | (Jamaica) Jon Bell | 2 | 0 | 0 | 1 | 0 | 0 | 0 | 0 | 0 | 3 | 0 | 0 |
| 17 | DF | (Republic of Ireland) Jon Gallagher | 2 | 0 | 0 | 0 | 0 | 0 | 0 | 0 | 0 | 2 | 0 | 0 |
| 21 | FW | (United States) Christian Ramirez | 1 | 0 | 0 | 0 | 0 | 0 | 0 | 0 | 0 | 1 | 0 | 0 |
| 23 | LB | (Slovenia) Žan Kolmanič | 0 | 0 | 1 | 0 | 0 | 0 | 0 | 0 | 0 | 0 | 0 | 1 |
| 24 | MF | (Spain) Jorge Alastuey | 1 | 0 | 0 | 0 | 0 | 0 | 0 | 0 | 0 | 1 | 0 | 0 |
| 29 | DF | (Brazil) Guilherme Biro | 5 | 1 | 1 | 0 | 0 | 0 | 0 | 0 | 0 | 5 | 1 | 1 |
| 30 | DF | (Honduras) Joseph Rosales | 6 | 0 | 0 | 0 | 0 | 0 | 1 | 0 | 1 | 7 | 0 | 1 |
| 32 | MF | (United States) Micah Burton | 1 | 0 | 0 | 0 | 0 | 0 | 0 | 0 | 0 | 1 | 0 | 0 |
| 35 | DF | (Serbia) Mateja Djordjevic | 1 | 0 | 0 | 0 | 0 | 0 | 1 | 0 | 0 | 2 | 0 | 0 |
| 38 | MF | (United States) Ervin Torres | 2 | 0 | 0 | 0 | 0 | 0 | 1 | 0 | 0 | 3 | 0 | 0 |
| 77 | FW | (Poland) Przemysław Płacheta | 1 | 0 | 0 | 0 | 0 | 0 | 0 | 0 | 0 | 1 | 0 | 0 |
| | MF | (Finland) Robert Taylor | 0 | 0 | 0 | 0 | 0 | 0 | 0 | 0 | 0 | 0 | 0 | 0 |
| | MF | (Venezuela) Daniel Pereira | 1 | 0 | 0 | 0 | 0 | 0 | 0 | 0 | 0 | 1 | 0 | 0 |
| | MF | (Argentina) Nicolás Dubersarsky | 2 | 0 | 0 | 0 | 0 | 0 | 0 | 0 | 0 | 2 | 0 | 0 |
| | FW | (Canada) Jayden Nelson | 2 | 0 | 0 | 0 | 0 | 0 | 0 | 0 | 0 | 2 | 0 | 0 |
| | MF | (United States) CJ Fodrey | 1 | 0 | 0 | 0 | 0 | 0 | 0 | 0 | 0 | 1 | 0 | 0 |
| | MF | (United States) Owen Wolff | 0 | 0 | 0 | 0 | 0 | 0 | 0 | 0 | 0 | 0 | 0 | 0 |
| Total | | | 47 | 1 | 2 | 1 | 0 | 0 | 7 | 0 | 2 | 54 | 1 | 4 |

- Last updated: November 7, 2026
- Source: https://www.austinfc.com/stats/

== Awards and honors ==
=== MLS Team of the Matchday ===
| Matchday | Player | Opponent | Position | Ref |
|---|---|---|---|---|
| 2 | (United States) Christian Ramirez | D.C. United | Bench | |
| 10 | (Albania) Myrto Uzuni | Houston Dynamo FC | Bench | |
| 11 | (United States) Christian Ramirez (2) | St. Louis City SC | Bench | |
| 16&17 | (Albania) Myrto Uzuni (2) | Seattle Sounders FC | Bench | |
| 21 | (United States) Damian Las | Seattle Sounders FC | Bench | |
| 23 | (Ukraine) Oleksandr Svatok | Portland Timbers | Bench | |
| 24 | (Brazil) Guilherme Biro | San Jose Earthquakes | DF | |
| 26 | (United States) Christian Ramirez | Vancouver Whitecaps FC | FW | |
| 27 | (United States) Brad Stuver | FC Dallas | Bench | |
| 32 | (Albania) Myrto Uzuni (3) | Sporting Kansas City | MF | |

=== MLS Goal of the Matchday ===
| Matchday | Player | Opponent | Ref |
|---|---|---|---|
| 21 | (Brazil) Guilherme Biro | Seattle Sounders FC | |
