= Owen Wolff =

American soccer player (born 2004)

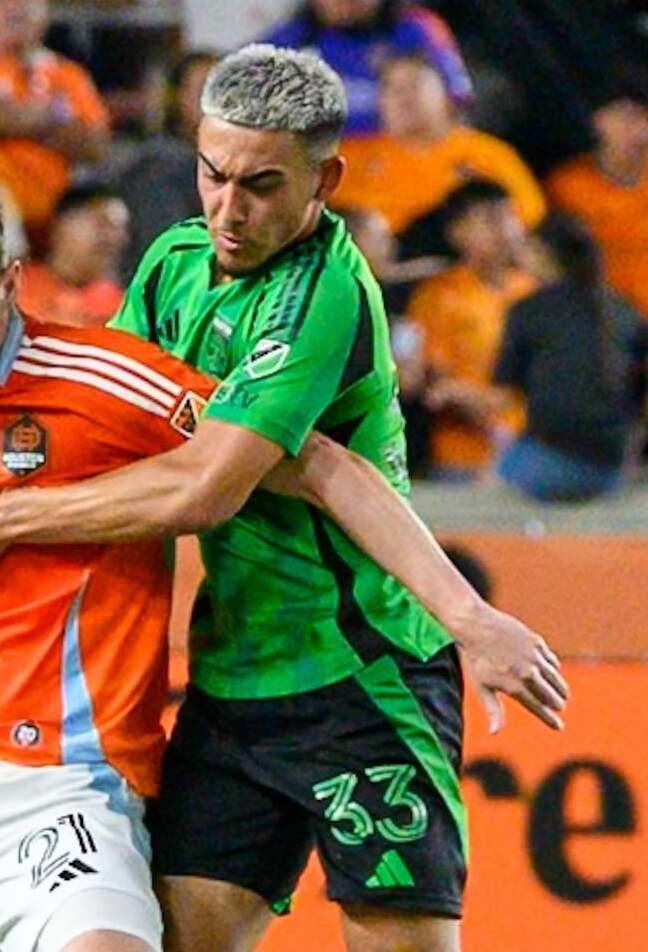
- Wolff with Austin FC in 2025

Personal information
- Full name: Owen Michael Wolff
- Date of birth: December 30, 2004 (age 21)
- Place of birth: Snellville, Georgia, U.S.
- Height: 5 ft 9 in (1.75 m)
- Position: Midfielder

Team information
- Current team: Sporting Kansas City
- Number: 33

Youth career
- 2018–2019: Columbus Crew
- 2019–2020: Atlanta United
- 2021: Austin FC

Senior career*
Years	Team	Apps	(Gls)
2020	Atlanta United 2	0	(0)
2021–2026	Austin FC	128	(10)
2026–	Sporting Kansas City	6	(0)

International career^{‡}
2022	United States U19	2	(1)
2023	United States U20	8	(2)
- * Club domestic league appearances and goals as of 21:36, November 8, 2026 (UTC) ‡ National team caps and goals as of June 4, 2023

Owen Michael Wolff (born December 30, 2004) is an American professional soccer player who plays as a midfielder for Major League Soccer club Sporting Kansas City.

== Club career ==
Wolff began his youth career with the academy at Columbus Crew, making four appearances for the Crew under-16 side during their 2018–19 season. He joined Atlanta United at the start of their 2019–20 season, making five appearances for their under-16 team. Wolff went on trial with Austin FC during the preseason of their inaugural season, also appearing for the club during a friendly on July 13, 2021, against Tigres UANL.

On September 9, 2021, Wolff signed a homegrown player contract with Major League Soccer side Austin FC, signing a deal through to 2025 and becoming the club's first ever homegrown player signing. He made his professional debut on November 3, 2021, appearing as an injury-time substitute during a 3–1 win over Sporting Kansas City. On May 18, 2022, Wolff earned the first start of his senior career in an away 2–1 win against LAFC.

On March 11, 2023, Wolff scored his first professional goal in a match at Real Salt Lake, making him part of the eighth father-son duo to score goals in MLS. At the end of the 2024 season, Austin FC and Wolff agreed to a three-year extension, taking his contract through the 2027 season with an option for 2028.

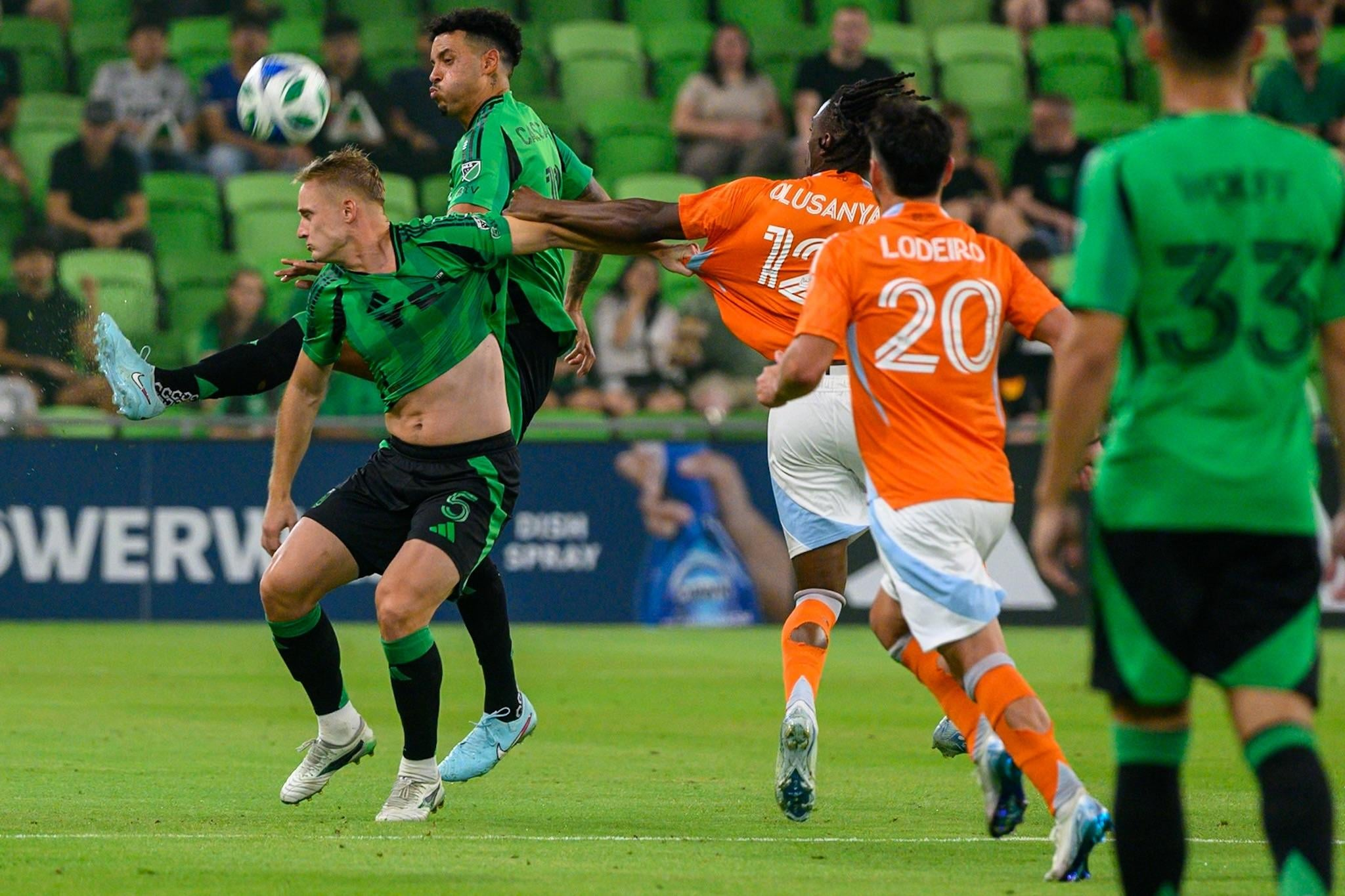
Wolff in the 2025 season vs Houston Dynamo

After the 2025 season, Wolff was named Austin's Offensive Player of the Year based on his seven goals and twelve assists across all competitions. Five days later, Austin extended Wolff's contract through June 2030 under the MLS U22 Initiative.

== International career ==
Owen Wolff received his first national team call up with the USMNT U19 team for the June friendlies earning his first cap against Norway. He received his second call up for USMNT U19 team during the Slovenia Nation's Cup in September 2022. Getting his second USMNT U19 start against Croatia, Owen scored his first international goal before receiving his second yellow of the game and being dismissed. In March 2023, Owen was selected for the USMNY U-20 team's March friendlies in preparation for the 2023 FIFA U-20 World Cup. Owen had two appearances and one goal during his three-game stint with the U-20 team. Wolff was called into the U-20 squad once again on May 10, 2023, for the 2023 FIFA U-20 World Cup.

== Personal ==
Owen is the middle son of former USMNT and early MLS forward Josh Wolff. He is the younger brother of soccer player Tyler Wolff. They are of Filipino descent on their mother's side.

== Career statistics ==
As of match played November 7, 2026

Appearances and goals by club, season and competition
Club	Season	Division	League		U.S. Open Cup		Continental		Other		Total	
Club	Season	Division	Apps	Goals	Apps	Goals	Apps	Goals	Apps	Goals	Apps	Goals
Austin FC	2021	Major League Soccer	2	0	—		—		—		2	0
Austin FC	2022	Major League Soccer	24	0	1	0	—		2 (Note: Appearances in MLS Cup playoffs)	0	27	0
Austin FC	2023	Major League Soccer	27	2	0	0	2 (Note: Appearances in CONCACAF Champions League)	0	2 (Note: Appearances in Leagues Cup)	0	31	2
Austin FC	2024	Major League Soccer	33	1	—		—		3	0	36	1
Austin FC	2025	Major League Soccer	34	7	5	0	—		2	0	41	7
Austin FC	2026	Major League Soccer	8	0	0	0	—		2	0	10	0
Austin FC	Total		128	10	6	0	2	0	11	0	147	10
Sporting Kansas City	2026	Major League Soccer	6	0	0	0	—		0	0	6	0
Career total			134	10	6	0	2	0	11	0	153	10
