= Guilherme Biro (footballer, born 2000) =

Brazilian footballer (born 2000)

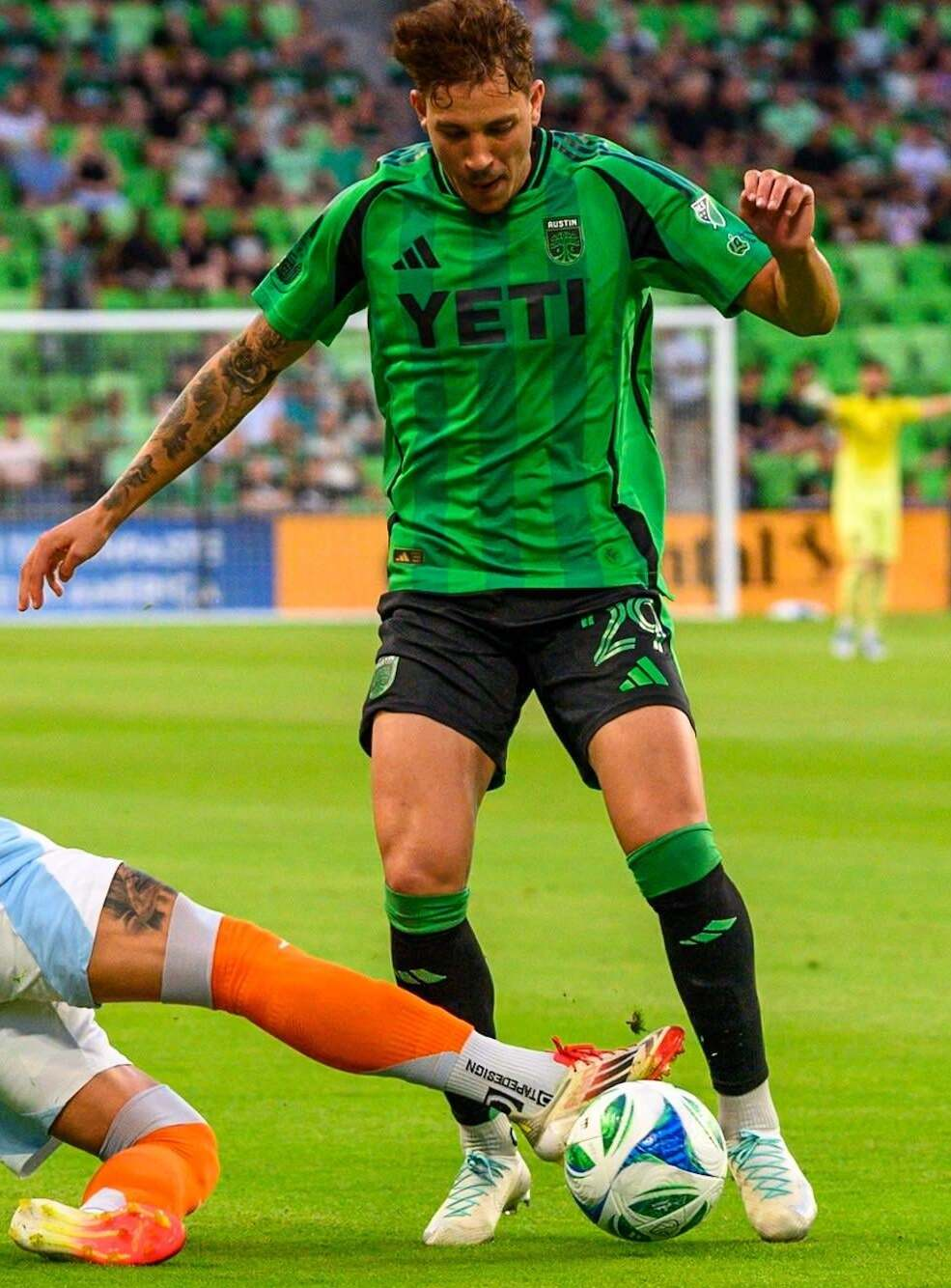
- Biro with Austin FC in 2025

Personal information
- Full name: Guilherme da Trindade Dubas
- Date of birth: 1 May 2000 (age 26)
- Place of birth: Curitiba, Brazil
- Height: 1.84 m (6 ft 0 in)
- Position: Defender

Team information
- Current team: Austin FC
- Number: 29

Youth career
- Coritiba

Senior career*
Years	Team	Apps	(Gls)
2020–2022	Coritiba	71	(1)
2023	Mirassol	43	(2)
2024–	Austin FC	92	(9)
- * Club domestic league appearances and goals as of 21:18, 8 November 2026 (UTC)

Guilherme da Trindade Dubas (born 1 May 2000), known as Guilherme Biro, is a Brazilian professional footballer who plays as a defender for Austin FC.

== Club career ==
Biro started his professional career with Coritiba, who re-signed him after his first year. Biro was part of the team that won the 2022 Campeonato Paranaense. After three seasons with Coritiba, Biro signed with Mirassol for the 2023 season.

In 2024 Biro signed with Austin FC on a three year deal with an additional 1-year club option.

== Career statistics ==
As of matches played on 31 October 2026

Appearances and goals by club, season and competition
Club	Season	League			State League (Note: Appearance(s) in Campeonato Paranaense and Campeonato Paulista)		National Cup (Note: Appearance(s) in Copa do Brasil and U.S. Open Cup)		Continental		Other		Total	
Club	Season	Division	Apps	Goals	Apps	Goals	Apps	Goals	Apps	Goals	Apps	Goals	Apps	Goals
Coritiba	2020	Série A	9	0	0	0	0	0	—		—		9	0
Coritiba	2021	Série B	33	1	3	0	0	0	—		—		36	1
Coritiba	2022	Série A	14	0	12	0	2	0	—		—		28	0
Mirassol	2023	Série B	29	2	14	0	0	0	—		—		43	2
Mirassol	Club Total		85	3	29	0	2	0	0	0	0	0	116	3
Austin FC	2024	MLS	31	3	—		—		—		3 (Note: Appearance(s) in Leagues Cup)	0	34	3
Austin FC	2025	MLS	32	3	—		5	0	—		2 (Note: Appearance in MLS Cup playoffs)	0	39	3
Austin FC	2026	MLS	29	3	—		1	0	—		4	0	34	3
Austin FC	Club Total		92	9	0	0	6	0	0	0	9	0	107	9
Career total			177	12	29	0	8	0	0	0	9	0	223	12

== Honours ==
Coritiba

- Campeonato Paranaense: 2022

Individual

- MLS All-Star: 2025
