= Przemysław Płacheta =

Polish footballer (born 1998)

Personal information
- Full name: Przemysław Płacheta
- Date of birth: 23 March 1998 (age 28)
- Place of birth: Łowicz, Poland
- Height: 1.78 m (5 ft 10 in)
- Positions: Left winger; left midfielder; left-back

Team information
- Current team: Austin FC
- Number: 77

Youth career
- Pelikan Łowicz
- –2011: ŁKS Łódź
- 2012: UKS SMS Łódź
- 2013–2015: Polonia Warsaw
- 2015–2017: RB Leipzig

Senior career*
Years	Team	Apps	(Gls)
2017	Sonnenhof Großaspach	2	(0)
2018	Pogoń Siedlce	11	(2)
2018–2019	Podbeskidzie	23	(6)
2019–2020	Śląsk Wrocław	35	(8)
2020–2024	Norwich City	54	(1)
2022–2023	→ Birmingham City (loan)	5	(1)
2024	Swansea City	10	(0)
2024–2026	Oxford United	57	(6)
2026–	Austin FC	16	(0)

International career
2015–2016	Poland U18	7	(0)
2017	Poland U19	3	(0)
2019	Poland U20	1	(0)
2019–2020	Poland U21	8	(1)
2020–2021	Poland	7	(0)
- * Club domestic league appearances and goals as of 21:41, 8 November 2026 (UTC)

Przemysław Płacheta (born 23 March 1998) is a Polish professional footballer who plays as a left winger, left midfielder, or left-back for Major League Soccer club Austin FC.

Płacheta graduated from RB Leipzig's youth academy and began his senior career in Germany with Sonnenhof Großaspach before returning to Poland where he played for Pogoń Siedlce, Podbeskidzie and Śląsk Wrocław. In 2020, he joined English club Norwich City, and spent time on loan at Birmingham City in 2022.

Having been a Polish international from 2020 to 2021, Płacheta represented his country at under-age levels before making his debut for the senior national side in 2020, making the UEFA Euro 2020 squad.

== Club career ==
Płacheta started his youth career for Polish side Pelikan Łowicz. He joined ŁKS Łódź after his father saw an advert in a newspaper for young footballers. Later, he played for RB Leipzig Academy in Germany, during which time he played for the senior side in a number of friendly matches. In 2017, Płacheta made his professional debut for German 3. Liga team Sonnenhof Großaspach. He later returned to Poland as his mother was ill. He then played for Pogoń Siedlce.

Prior to the 2018–19 I liga, Płacheta signed for Podbeskidzie Bielsko-Biała, and made 25 appearances for the club that season. In 2019, Płacheta signed for Śląsk Wrocław for around 300,000 Polish złoty. He signed a three-year contract with the club. During a pre-season tour, Płacheta reached a speed of 35.22 kilometres per hour (21.88 mph), the highest recorded speed for any Polish league player that pre-season. In the 2019–20 I liga, he scored eight goals in 35 appearances, and provided five assists.

In July 2020, Płacheta signed for English club Norwich City, on a four-year deal. The deal was estimated to be around €3 million (around 12 million złoty), a club record sale for Śląsk Wrocław. Płacheta was Norwich's first ever Polish player. He scored his first goal for Norwich in a 2–2 draw against Preston North End on 19 September 2020.

Płacheta joined EFL Championship club Birmingham City in July 2022 on loan for the season. He scored his first goal on his second appearance, at home to Huddersfield Town on 5 August, when he drove the rebound from Jordan James's blocked shot past the goalkeeper to give his side a 2–0 half-time lead; the match ended 2–1. After starting the first five matches of the season, used in an unfamiliar left wing-back position, he suffered a stress fracture to his left tibia and did not play again. His loan was terminated on 3 January 2023 and he returned to Norwich to continue his recovery.

Płacheta joined Championship club Swansea City on 1 February 2024 on a free transfer. He signed until the end of the 2023–24 season. He made appearances in ten consecutive games since joining Swansea, before picking up a hamstring injury in late March that kept him out of play for the rest of the season. On 17 May, it was announced he would leave the club upon the expiration of his contract.

On 15 July 2024, Płacheta signed for newly promoted Championship club Oxford United on a free transfer. On 11 May 2026, the club announced Płacheta would leave in the summer when his contract expired.

On 30 June 2026, Major League Soccer club Austin FC announced the signing of Płacheta on a deal until mid-2029, with an option for another year.

== International career ==
Płacheta played for Poland under-21s in a 2019 UEFA European Under-21 Championship match against Spain under-21s in Italy. He was the youngest player in Czesław Michniewicz's Poland under-21 squad. In November 2020, Płacheta made his first appearance for the Poland senior team in a friendly match against Ukraine. He was chosen in Poland's 26-man squad for the UEFA Euro 2020 tournament.

== Personal life ==
Płacheta was born on 23 March 1998 in Łowicz, Poland. When he was young, he was a bobsledder, before choosing to become a footballer. Płacheta has said that he is a fan of Chelsea footballer Raheem Sterling, and has compared his playing style to Sterling. His older brother Marcin is a former runner and bobsledder who competed at the 2006 Winter Olympics. His other older brother Sylwester has played football for MKS Kutno.

== Career statistics ==
=== Club ===
As of match played 7 November 2026

Appearances and goals by club, season and competition
Club	Season	League			National cup (Note: Includes Polish Cup, FA Cup)		League cup (Note: Includes EFL Cup)		Other		Total	
Club	Season	Division	Apps	Goals	Apps	Goals	Apps	Goals	Apps	Goals	Apps	Goals
Sonnenhof Großaspach	2017–18	3. Liga	2	0	0	0	—		—		2	0
Pogoń Siedlce	2017–18	I liga	11	2	0	0	—		—		11	2
Podbeskidzie	2018–19	I liga	23	6	2	0	—		—		25	6
Śląsk Wrocław	2019–20	Ekstraklasa	35	8	0	0	—		—		35	8
Norwich City	2020–21	Championship	26	1	2	0	0	0	—		28	1
Norwich City	2021–22	Premier League	12	0	2	0	0	0	—		14	0
Norwich City	2022–23	Championship	0	0	0	0	0	0	—		0	0
Norwich City	2023–24	Championship	16	0	0	0	3	1	—		19	1
Norwich City	Total		54	1	4	0	3	1	—		61	2
Birmingham City (loan)	2022–23	Championship	5	1	—		0	0	—		5	1
Swansea City	2023–24	Championship	10	0	—		—		—		10	0
Oxford United	2024–25	Championship	32	3	1	0	0	0	—		33	3
Oxford United	2025–26	Championship	25	3	1	0	1	0	—		27	3
Oxford United	Total		57	6	2	0	1	0	0	0	60	6
Austin FC	2026	Major League Soccer	16	0	—		—		3 (Note: Appearance in Leagues Cup)	0	19	0
Career total			213	24	8	0	4	1	3	0	228	25

=== International ===
Appearances and goals by national team and year
National team	Year	Apps	Goals
Poland
Poland	2020	2	0
Poland	2021	5	0
Total		7	0

== Honours ==
Norwich City

- EFL Championship: 2020–21

Individual

- Ekstraklasa Young Player of the Month: August 2019
