= Eze Onuoha =

Finnish footballer (born 2008)

Personal information
- Full name: Gospel Chibueze Junior Onuoha
- Date of birth: 19 December 2008 (age 17)
- Place of birth: Helsinki, Finland
- Height: 1.79 m (5 ft 10 in)
- Position: Central midfielder

Team information
- Current team: SJK
- Number: 31

Youth career
- –2021: MPS
- 2022–2024: Honka

Senior career*
Years	Team	Apps	(Gls)
2024–2025	Honka	5	(0)
2025–	SJK Akatemia	17	(0)
2026–	SJK	15	(2)

International career^{‡}
2025	Finland U17	5	(0)
2026–	Finland U18	2	(0)
- * Club domestic league appearances and goals as of 18 October 2026 ‡ National team caps and goals as of 22 August 2026

Gospel Chibueze Junior Onuoha (born 19 December 2008) is a Finnish professional footballer who plays as a central midfielder for Veikkausliiga club SJK Seinäjoki.

== Club career ==
Onuoha was raised in Malmi, Helsinki and played in the youth sector of Malmin Palloseura until 2021, when he joined Honka in Espoo. He made his senior debut with Honka in 2024 in Kakkonen.

In August 2025, Onuoha joined SJK Seinäjoki organisation. He made his Veikkausliiga debut with SJK in the 2026 season.
