= Nicolás Dubersarsky =

Argentine footballer (born 2004)

Personal information
- Date of birth: 21 December 2004 (age 21)
- Place of birth: Córdoba, Argentina
- Height: 1.88 m (6 ft 2 in)
- Position: Midfielder

Team information
- Current team: Tigre (on loan from Austin FC)

Youth career
- 2017–2023: Instituto

Senior career*
Years	Team	Apps	(Gls)
2023–2025	Instituto	27	(0)
2025–	Austin FC	33	(0)
2026–	→ Tigre (loan)	1	(0)
- * Club domestic league appearances and goals as of 00:02, 3 October 2026 (UTC)

Nicolás Dubersarsky (born 21 December 2004) is an Argentine professional footballer who plays as a midfielder for Tigre on loan from Major League Soccer club Austin FC.

== Career ==
He joined Argentine club Instituto at 12 years-old. He made his league debut for the club on 26 November 2023 away against River Plate. He established himself as a regular in the Argentine Primera Division in 2024 and signed a new three-and-a-half contract with the club in July of that year. He had played 25 league games for the club by the end of the 2024 league season.

He joined Austin FC on a five-year contract ahead of the 2025 MLS season. The transfer fee was reported to be $3 million plus add-ons, which could total $250,000. The transfer became the second highest fee received in Instituto's history, behind Paulo Dybala's move away from the club in 2012.

On 30 July 2026 moved on loan to Argentine Primera División side Club Atlético Tigre until June 2027.

== Career statistics ==
=== Club ===
As of matches played on 23 May 2026

Appearances and goals by club, season and competition
Club	Season	Division	League		National cup		Continental		Other		Total	
Club	Season	Division	Apps	Goals	Apps	Goals	Apps	Goals	Apps	Goals	Apps	Goals
Instituto	2023	Argentine Primera Division	2	0	—		—		—		2	0
Instituto	2024	Argentine Primera División	25	0	0	0	—		—		25	0
Instituto	Total		27	0	0	0	0	0	0	0	27	0
Austin FC	2025	Major League Soccer	22	0	3	0	—		—		25	0
Austin FC	2026	Major League Soccer	11	0	1	0	—		0	0	12	0
Austin FC	Total		33	0	4	0	0	0	0	0	37	0
Career total			60	0	4	0	0	0	0	0	64	0
