= Mikkel Desler =

Danish footballer (born 1995)

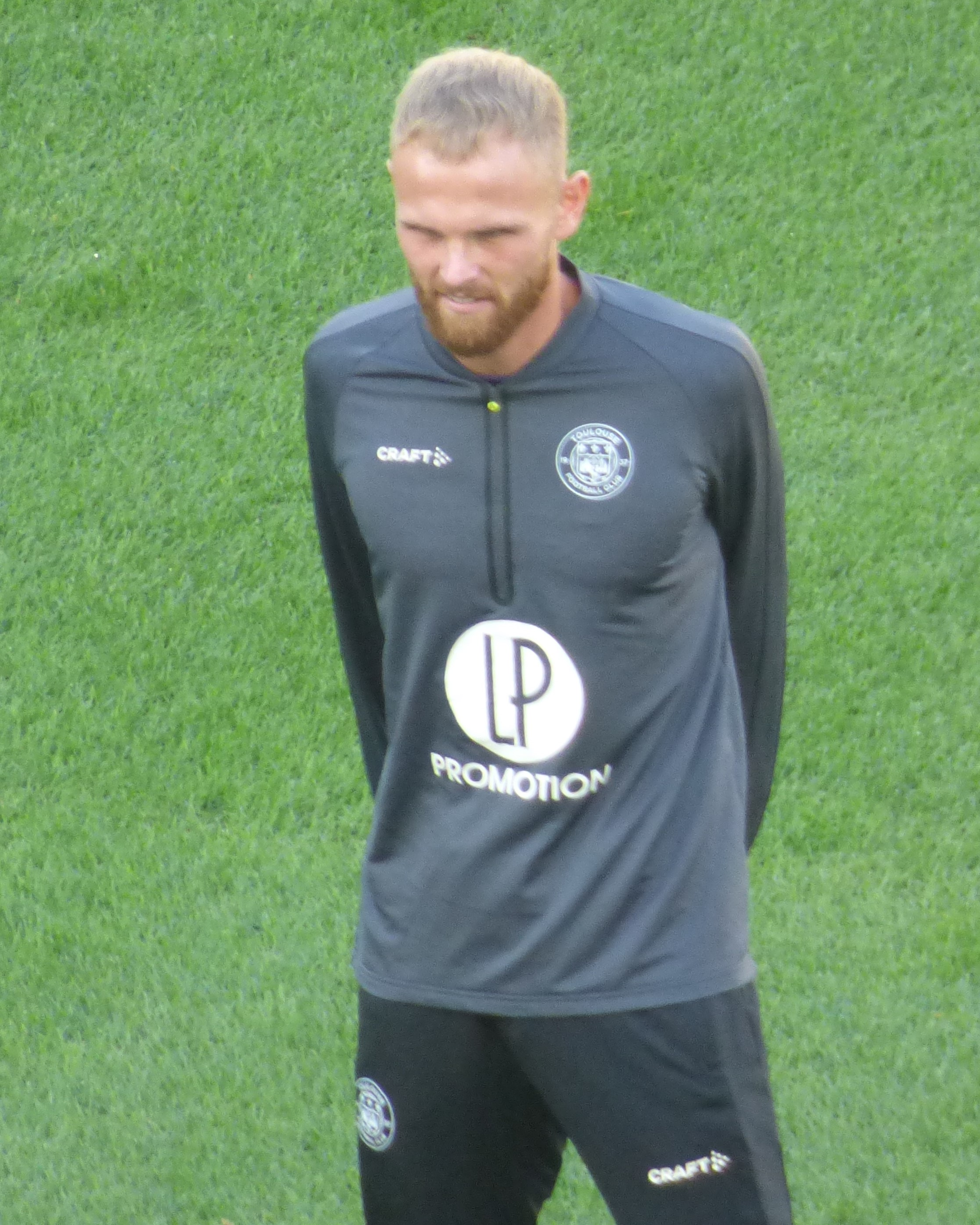
- Desler with Toulouse in 2023

Personal information
- Full name: Mikkel Desler Puggaard
- Date of birth: 19 February 1995 (age 31)
- Place of birth: Assens, Denmark
- Height: 1.84 m (6 ft 0 in)
- Positions: Right-back; right midfielder

Team information
- Current team: Austin FC
- Number: 3

Youth career
- Assens FC
- OB

Senior career*
Years	Team	Apps	(Gls)
2014–2019	OB	116	(1)
2019–2021	Haugesund	67	(2)
2021–2024	Toulouse	89	(2)
2024–	Austin FC	49	(2)

International career
2011	Denmark U16	1	(0)
2011–2012	Denmark U17	7	(0)
2012–2013	Denmark U18	4	(1)
2013	Denmark U19	2	(0)
2014	Denmark U20	1	(0)
2015–2017	Denmark U21	11	(0)
- * Club domestic league appearances and goals as of 20:13, 1 November 2026 (UTC)

Mikkel Desler Puggaard (born 19 February 1995) is a Danish professional footballer who plays as a right-back or right midfielder for Major League Soccer club Austin FC.

== Club career ==
=== OB ===
In February 2014, Desler attracted interest from several clubs, among others Parma and Roma. At the time, he was compared to former Roma player Daniele De Rossi.

On 8 May 2014, Desler got his debut for OB, replacing Mustafa Abdellaoue in the 73rd minute in a 2–1 victory against Randers FC in the Danish Superliga.

At the age of 19, Desler was promoted into the first team squad in the summer 2014 and also signed a new three-year contract with OB, after an impressive performance on a training camp with the first team in the winter 2014.

=== Haugesund ===
On 19 March 2019, Desler signed with Norwegian Eliteserien side Haugesund.

=== Toulouse ===
Desler joined French side Toulouse in 2021. He helped the club win the 2021–22 Ligue 2, and finished in the league's Team of the Year. He also achieved the 2022–23 Coupe de France with the club, securing their first-ever title in the competition.

=== Austin FC ===
On June 3, 2024, it was confirmed that Desler had signed a 3.5-year contract, with an option for an additional year, with American MLS club Austin FC. He joined the club on a free transfer as his contract at Toulouse expired at the end of June 2024.

== Career statistics ==
=== Club ===
As of match played 7 November 2026

Appearances and goals by club, season and competition
Club	Season	League			League Cup		National cup (Note: Includes Danish Cup, Norwegian Football Cup, Coupe de France, U.S. Open Cup)		Continental		Other		Total	
Club	Season	Division	Apps	Goals	Apps	Goals	Apps	Goals	Apps	Goals	Apps	Goals	Apps	Goals
Odense Boldklub	2013–14	Danish Superliga	2	0	—		0	0	—		—		2	0
Odense Boldklub	2014–15	Danish Superliga	27	0	—		0	0	—		—		27	0
Odense Boldklub	2015–16	Danish Superliga	19	0	—		0	0	—		—		19	0
Odense Boldklub	2016–17	Danish Superliga	34	1	—		0	0	—		—		34	1
Odense Boldklub	2017–18	Danish Superliga	22	0	—		0	0	—		—		22	0
Odense Boldklub	2018–19	Danish Superliga	12	0	—		3	0	—		—		15	0
Odense Boldklub	Total		116	1	—		3	0	—		—		119	1
Haugesund	2019	Eliteserien	29	1	—		6	0	6 (Note: Appearances in UEFA Europa League)	0	—		41	1
Haugesund	2020	Eliteserien	28	0	—		0	0	—		—		28	0
Haugesund	2021	Eliteserien	10	1	—		0	0	—		—		10	1
Haugesund	Total		67	2	—		6	0	6	0	—		79	2
Toulouse	2021–22	Ligue 2	38	1	—		3	0	—		—		41	1
Toulouse	2022–23	Ligue 1	27	1	—		5	0	—		—		32	1
Toulouse	2023–24	Ligue 1	24	0	—		0	0	7	1	0	0	31	1
Toulouse	Total		89	2	—		8	0	7	1	0	0	104	3
Austin FC	2024	Major League Soccer	7	0	—		—		—		3 (Note: Appearances in Leagues Cup)	0	10	0
Austin FC	2025	Major League Soccer	20	1	2 (Note: Appearances in MLS Cup playoffs)	0	3	0	—		0	0	25	1
Austin FC	2026	Major League Soccer	23	1	0	0	1	0	—		1	0	25	1
Austin FC	Total		50	2	2	0	4	0	0	0	4	0	60	2
Career total			322	7	2	0	21	0	13	1	4	0	362	8

== Honours ==
Toulouse

- Coupe de France: 2022–23
- Ligue 2: 2021–22

Individual

- UNFP Ligue 2 Team of the Year: 2021–22
