= Mateja Đorđević =

Serbian footballer (born 2003)

Personal information
- Date of birth: 17 January 2003 (age 23)
- Place of birth: Kruševac, Serbia, FR Yugoslavia
- Height: 1.91 m (6 ft 3 in)
- Position: Defender

Team information
- Current team: Austin FC
- Number: 35

Youth career
- –2018: FK Internacional
- 2018–2021: Partizan

Senior career*
| Years | Team | Apps | (Gls) |
| 2021 | Partizan | 0 | (0) |
| 2022–2023 | Voždovac | 27 | (0) |
| 2023–2025 | TSC | 38 | (0) |
| 2025– | Austin FC | 11 | (0) |

International career^{‡}
| 2019 | Serbia U16 | 4 | (0) |
| 2019 | Serbia U17 | 4 | (0) |
| 2022 | Serbia U19 | 7 | (0) |
| 2022–2023 | Serbia U21 | 4 | (0) |
- * Club domestic league appearances and goals as of 00:23, 24 August 2026 (UTC) ‡ National team caps and goals as of 18 November 2023

Mateja Đorđević (Serbian Cyrillic: Матеја Ђорђевић; born 17 January 2003) is a Serbian professional footballer who plays as a defender for Austin FC.

== Early life ==
Đorđević was born on 17 January 2003 in Serbia. The son of Ivan and Biljana Đorđević, he has an older brother.

== Club career ==
As a youth player, Đorđević joined the youth academy of Serbian side FK Internacional. Following his stint there, he joined the youth academy of Serbian side Partizan in 2018 and was promoted to the club's senior team in 2021, where he made zero league appearances and scored zero goals.

Ahead of the second half of the 2022–23 season, he signed for Serbian side Voždovac, where he made twenty-seven league appearances and scored zero goals. Subsequently, he signed for Serbian side TSC in 2023, where he made thirty-eight league appearances and scored zero goals. Eighteen months later, he signed for American side Austin FC.

== International career ==
Đorđević is a Serbia youth international. During September and November 2023, he played for the Serbia national under-21 football team for 2025 UEFA European Under-21 Championship qualification.

== Style of play ==
Đorđević plays as a defender and is right-footed. American news website Verde All Day wrote in 2025 that he "is best with successful take-ons, progressive passes, and tackles".

== Career statistics ==
=== Club ===
As of matches played on 19 August 2026

Appearances and goals by club, season and competition
| Club | Season | Division | League | | League Cup | | National cup (Note: Includes Serbian Cup and U.S. Open Cup) | | Continental | | Other | | Total | |
| Club | Season | Division | Apps | Goals | Apps | Goals | Apps | Goals | Apps | Goals | Apps | Goals | Apps | Goals |
|---|---|---|---|---|---|---|---|---|---|---|---|---|---|---|
| FK Voždovac | 2021–22 | Serbian SuperLiga | 2 | 0 | — | | 0 | 0 | — | | — | | 2 | 0 |
| FK Voždovac | 2022–23 | Serbian SuperLiga | 25 | 0 | — | | 0 | 0 | — | | — | | 25 | 0 |
| FK Voždovac | Total | | 27 | 0 | — | | 0 | 0 | — | | — | | 27 | 0 |
| FK TSC | 2023–24 | Serbian SuperLiga | 15 | 0 | — | | 0 | 0 | 4 (Note: 2 appearances in UEFA Europa League and 2 appearances in UEFA Conference League) | 0 | — | | 19 | 0 |
| FK TSC | 2024–25 | Serbian SuperLiga | 23 | 0 | — | | 1 | 0 | 8 (Note: 1 appearances in UEFA Europa League and 7 appearances in UEFA Conference League) | 0 | — | | 19 | 0 |
| FK TSC | Total | | 38 | 0 | — | | 1 | 0 | 12 | 0 | — | | 51 | 0 |
| Austin FC | 2025 | Major League Soccer | 4 | 0 | 0 | 0 | 1 | 0 | — | | — | | 5 | 0 |
| Austin FC | 2026 | Major League Soccer | 7 | 0 | — | | 1 | 0 | — | | 2 (Note: Includes appearances in Leagues Cup) | 0 | 9 | 0 |
| Austin FC | Total | | 11 | 0 | 0 | 0 | 2 | 0 | — | | 2 | 0 | 15 | 0 |
| Career total | | | 76 | 0 | 0 | 0 | 3 | 0 | 12 | 0 | 2 | 0 | 93 | 0 |
