= Nico Estévez =

Spanish football manager

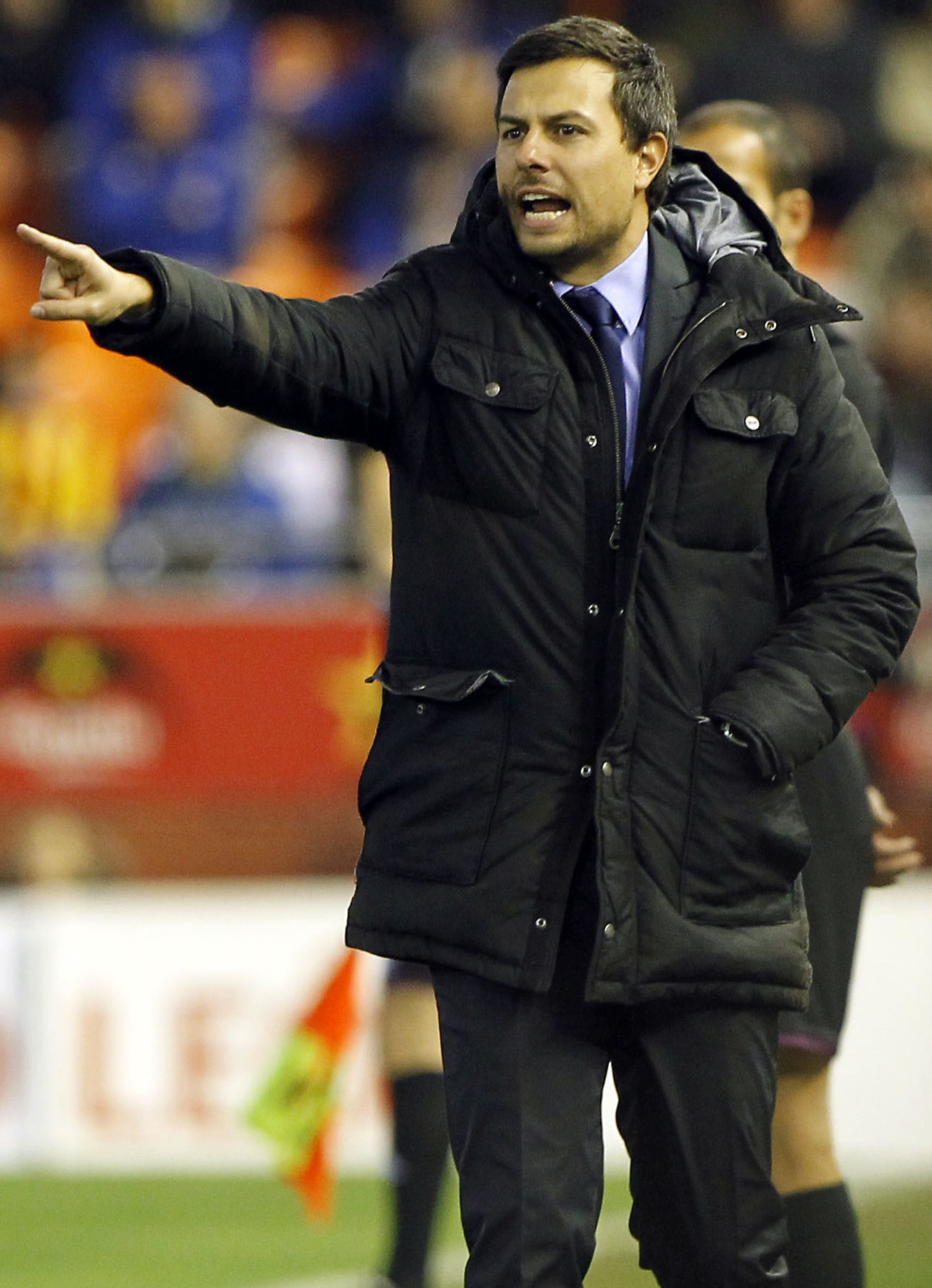
- Estévez in charge of Valencia in 2013

Personal information
- Full name: Nicolás Estévez Martínez
- Date of birth: 29 January 1980 (age 46)
- Place of birth: Valencia, Spain
- Height: 6 ft 2 in (1.88 m)

Managerial career
- Years: Team
- 2011–2013: Huracán Valencia
- 2013–2014: Valencia B
- 2013: Valencia (caretaker)
- 2022–2024: FC Dallas
- 2024–2026: Austin FC
- 2026–: Chicago Fire (assistant)

Nicolás "Nico" Estévez Martínez (born 29 January 1980) is a Spanish football manager. He is currently the assistant coach of Chicago Fire FC in Major League Soccer.

== Career ==
=== Early career ===
Born in Valencia, Estévez began his career with the youth categories of local side CF San José, at the age of just 19. In 2004, he was hired by Valencia CF to work in their youth setup.

In July 2011, Estévez was appointed manager of newly-created side Huracán Valencia CF in Segunda División B. On 1 July 2013, after missing out promotion twice in the play-offs, he announced his departure from the club.

=== Valencia ===
On 4 July 2013, Estévez returned to Valencia after being named in charge of the reserves also in the third level. On 16 December, he was named interim manager of Valencia's first team, after Miroslav Đukić was dismissed. He was in charge of the team for two matches, a 1–0 Copa del Rey home win against Gimnàstic de Tarragona and a 2–3 La Liga home loss against Real Madrid; at the age of 33, he became the second-youngest manager in the history of the club, only behind Óscar Fernández, also an interim.

Shortly after, Estévez returned to his previous role with Mestalla after the appointment of Juan Antonio Pizzi. He was sacked by Mestalla on 7 April 2014, after nine winless matches, and was replaced by Curro Torres.

=== Assistant ===
In September 2014, Estévez moved abroad and joined American side Columbus Crew SC, as a Director of Methodology. On 6 January 2017, he was promoted to assistant coach of Gregg Berhalter in Crew SC's first team. On 16 January 2019, he followed Berhalter to the United States men's soccer team, again as his assistant.

=== FC Dallas ===
On 2 December 2021, Estévez was announced as the new head coach of Major League Soccer side FC Dallas. In his first season in charge of the side, he qualified them for the playoffs, finishing third on the Western Conference with 53 points, 20 more than last year; it was the biggest year-over-year improvement in the club's history.

On 9 June 2024, Estévez was relieved of his duties as FC Dallas head coach after a 3–8–5 start to the season.

=== Austin FC ===
On 25 October 2024, Estévez was hired by Dallas' rivals Austin FC as their new head coach for the upcoming season. Estévez was relieved of his duties as Head Coach on 18 May 2026, alongside Sporting Director Rodolfo Borrell.

== Managerial statistics ==
As of 16 May 2026

Managerial record by team and tenure
Team	Nat	From	To	Record								Ref
Team	Nat	From	To	G	W	D	L	GF	GA	GD	Win %	Ref
Huracán Valencia	(Spain)	1 July 2011	1 July 2013	88	41	34	13	109	62	+47	46.59	
Valencia B	(Spain)	4 July 2013	7 April 2014	32	8	6	18	28	44	−16	25.00	
Valencia (interim)	(Spain)	16 December 2013	26 December 2013	2	1	0	1	3	3	+0	50.00	
FC Dallas	(United States)	2 December 2021	9 June 2024	97	35	32	30	132	120	+12	36.08	
Austin FC	(United States)	25 October 2024	18 May 2026	56	19	14	23	70	89	−19	33.93	
Career total				275	104	86	85	342	318	+24	37.82	—

== Honours ==
=== Individual ===
- Segunda División B Group 3 Best Coach (Ramón Cobo Award): 2012–13
