= Anthony Precourt =

American investor

- Born: Jay Anthony Precourt Jr. 1969 or 1970 (age 56–57); Denver, Colorado
- Education: Pepperdine University (BA); Dartmouth College Tuck School of Business (MBA)
- Spouse: Agatha Matosek
- Children: 3

Jay Anthony Precourt Jr. (born c. 1969–70) is an American investor and sports team owner. He is the CEO of Two Oak Ventures (formerly Precourt Sports Ventures), a group that owns Major League Soccer club Austin FC and formerly owned the Columbus Crew. He is also a managing partner of Precourt Capital Management, a private investment management firm based in San Francisco, California.

== Education and career ==
Precourt was raised in Denver, Colorado, and went to high school in Connecticut. He graduated from Pepperdine University with a Bachelor of Arts in political science and from the Tuck School of Business at Dartmouth College with a Master of Business Administration. Precourt entered the corporate finance business with stints at Merrill Lynch, Alex. Brown & Sons, and WHV Investment Management. He then started his own private equity firm, Precourt Capital Management, in 2008, focusing on the energy sector.

== MLS ownership ==
Precourt, who had a stated interest in soccer, formed Precourt Sports Ventures LLC in 2012 and looked to invest in Major League Soccer. The firm bought the Columbus Crew from Clark Hunt for $68 million, then a record for a MLS franchise. At the first Crew match he attended, several months before the sale was finalized, the scoreboard at Mapfre Stadium caught fire and delayed kickoff for about an hour. Under Precourt's ownership, the Crew hired Gregg Berhalter as its manager and first sporting director; and unveiled an updated brand identity that included a new logo and name with the suffix "SC".

On October 17, 2017, Precourt Sports Ventures announced that it was considering moving the franchise in 2019 to Austin, Texas. The move came as a surprise to Columbus leaders and fans. After offering an apology on Twitter, Precourt was the focus of anger from the team's supporters, culminating in the establishment of the Save the Crew movement.

In December 2018, Precourt Sports Ventures announced they had negotiated an agreement with the City of Austin to build a $242 million stadium on public land at 10414 McKalla Place, following an evaluation of several other city-owned properties. Construction began in 2019, and Q2 Stadium opened in 2021, hosting its first soccer match on June 16, 2021.

On January 1, 2019, ownership of Crew SC was preliminarily transferred from Precourt Sports Ventures to a group composed of Dee and Jimmy Haslam and Dr. Pete Edwards, who pledged to keep the Crew in Columbus and build a new stadium in downtown Columbus. Austin FC was officially announced as the 27th MLS franchise on January 15, 2019 and began play in 2021. Precourt Sports Ventures was rebranded as Two Oak Ventures in July 2019, with Precourt remaining as CEO, and six Austin-based owners were added the following month.

== Personal life ==
Precourt lives in Austin, Texas, with his wife Agatha and three children. His father was the oil tycoon and philanthropist Jay A. Precourt.
