= List of Austin FC players =

List of players for Austin FC

Austin FC is an American soccer club that plays in Austin, Texas as part of Major League Soccer, the top tier of the American Soccer Pyramid. Austin FC was founded in 2018 and played their first season in the league in the 2021 season. Home games are played at Q2 Stadium, competing in the Western Conference of the MLS. Austin FC is the first top-tier professional sports team in the city of Austin.

== Players ==
=== Outfield players ===
Current players on the Austin roster are shown in bold. As of November 10, 2026.

Name	Position	Country	Years	Games	Goals	Assists
**Jorge Alastuey**	MF	SPA	**2026–**	20	1	1
Charlie Asensio	DF	USA	2022–2023	0	0	0
**Jon Bell**	DF	USA	**2026–**	24	2	1
Sebastian Berhalter	MF	USA	2021	18	0	1
Matt Besler	DF	USA	2021	20	0	0
**Guilherme Biro**	DF	BRA	**2024–**	106	9	5
Will Bruin	FW	USA	2023	23	3	1
Osman Bukari	MF	GHA	2024–2025	49	6	10
**Micah Burton**	MF	USA	**2024–**	4	0	1
Julio Cascante	DF	CRC	2021–2025	141	9	10
Washington Corozo	FW	ECU	2022	3	0	1
Brandan Craig	DF	USA	2023	0	0	0
**Mikkel Desler**	DF	DEN	**2024–**	60	2	4
Sofiane Djeffal	MF	FRA	2023	10	0	1
Moussa Djitté	FW	SEN	2021–2024	33	6	2
Cecilio Domínguez	MF	PAR	2021–2022	38	9	4
**Mateja Đorđević**	DF	SER	**2025–**	15	0	0
Sebastián Driussi	FW	ARG	2021–2024	115	51	18
**Nicolás Dubersarsky**	MF	ARG	**2025–**	37	0	2
Diego Fagúndez	MF	URU	2021–2023	95	17	22
Jimmy Farkarlun	WG	LBR	2024–2025	1	0	0
Ethan Finlay	MF	USA	2022–2024	100	12	10
**CJ Fodrey**	MF	USA	**2023–**	58	3	2
Ruben Gabrielsen	DF	NOR	2022	37	2	2
McKinze Gaines	FW	USA	2021	9	1	0
**Jon Gallagher**	FW/DF	IRL	**2021–**	216	15	24
Antonio Gomez	DF	USA	**2024–**	0	0	0
**Adrián González**	MF	USA	**2025–**	0	0	0
Joe Hafferty	DF	USA	2023	0	0	0
Matt Hedges	DF	USA	2023–2024	25	2	0
Brendan Hines-Ike	DF	USA	2024–2026	99	4	5
Danny Hoesen	FW	NED	2021–2022	21	3	1
Hector Jiménez	DF	USA	2021–2024	60	1	7
Kipp Keller	DF	USA	2022–2023	17	0	1
Freddy Kleemann	DF	USA	2021	3	0	0
**Žan Kolmanič**	DF	SLO	**2021–**	128	1	12
Nick Lima	DF	USA	2021–2023	104	1	12
Adam Lundqvist	DF	SWE	2023	28	0	3
Kekuta Manneh	FW	GAM	2021	16	0	0
Felipe Martins	MF	BRA	2022	32	1	3
Jayden Nelson	FW	CAN	2026	15	2	1
Valentin Noël	MF	FRA	2023–2024	1	0	0
Jáder Obrian	FW	COL	2024–2025	71	8	5
**Eze Onuoha**	MF	FIN	**2027–**	0	0	0
Daniel Pereira	MF	VEN	2021–2026	165	6	23
Emmanual Perez	MF	USA	2021	10	0	0
**Przemysław Płacheta**	FW	POL	**2026–**	19	0	0
Tomás Pochettino	MF	ARG	2021–2022	31	2	2
Aleksandar Radovanović	DF	SER	2023	9	0	0
Alonso Ramírez	MF	MEX	2024	2	0	0
**Christian Ramirez**	FW	USA	**2026–**	33	9	4
Rodney Redes	FW	PAR	2021–2023	54	2	2
Emiliano Rigoni	MF	ARG	2022–2024	58	6	7
Alexander Ring	MF	FIN	2021–2024	137	13	19
David Rodríguez	MF	USA	2023	0	0	0
Memo Rodríguez	MF	USA	2023	9	0	0
Jhohan Romaña	DF	COL	2021–2023	35	0	0
**Joseph Rosales**	DF	HON	**2026-**	35	2	7
Diego Rubio	FW	CHI	2024–2025	66	6	5
**Besard Šabović**	MF	SWE	**2025–**	72	1	4
Ilie Sánchez	MF	SPA	2025–2026	65	3	3
Aaron Schoenfeld	FW	USA	2021	0	0	0
Ulises Segura	MF	CRC	2021	0	0	0
Aedan Stanley	DF	USA	2021	9	0	0
Jared Stroud	MF	USA	2021–2022	27	1	4
**Oleksandr Svatok**	DF	UKR	**2024–**	72	2	0
Ben Sweat	DF	USA	2021	2	0	0
Amro Tarek	DF	EGY	2023	1	0	0
Robert Taylor	MF	FIN	2025–2026	23	1	2
Riley Thomas	DF	USA	2025–2026	1	0	0
**Ervin Torres**	MF	USA	**2024–**	26	2	6
**Facundo Torres**	MF	URU	**2026–**	36	4	10
Maximiliano Urruti	FW	ARG	2022–2023	64	11	2
**Myrto Uzuni**	MF	ALB	**2025–**	64	22	12
Leo Väisänen	DF	FIN	2023–2025	38	1	1
Jhojan Valencia	MF	COL	2022–2024	76	0	5
Nico Van Rijn	DF	NED	2025	0	0	0
**Brandon Vázquez**	FW	USA	**2025–**	48	12	4
Owen Wolff	MF	USA	2021–2026	146	10	23
Gyasi Zardes	FW	USA	2023–2024	67	10	4

=== Goalkeepers ===
As of November 7, 2026.

Name	Country	Years	Games	Conceded	Clean sheets (Note: A shutout occurs when a goalkeeper plays in a game without conceding a goal. This is sometimes known outside North America as a clean sheet.)	Goals per game
Matt Bersano	USA	2023–2024	0	0	0	0
**Damian Las**	USA	**2022–**	6	13	0	2.17
Brady Scott	USA	2021	0	0	0	0
**Brad Stuver**	USA	**2021–**	217	330	44	1.52
Andrew Tarbell	USA	2021–2022	6	14	0	2.67
Will Pulisic	USA	2021	0	0	0	0
Stefan Cleveland	USA	2024–2025	2	4	0	2.00

=== By Nationality ===
As of November 7, 2026.

Country	Number of players	Games
ALB	1	68
ARG	5	306
BRA	2	143
CAN	1	15
CHI	1	66
COL	3	182
CRC	2	141
DEN	1	60
ECU	1	3
EGY	1	1
FIN	4	197
FRA	2	11
GAM	1	16
GHA	1	49
HON	1	35
IRL	1	216
JAM	1	24
LBR	1	1
MEX	1	2
NED	1	21
NOR	1	37
PAR	2	92
POL	1	19
SEN	1	33
SER	2	24
SLO	1	128
SPA	2	84
SUI	1	0
SWE	2	100
UKR	1	72
URU	2	131
USA	37	1146
VEN	1	165
