= 2025 Austin FC II season =

Austin FC II
2025 season
- Chairman: Anthony Precourt
- Head coach: Brett Uttley
- Stadium: Parmer Field
- MLSNP: Frontier Division: 5th Western Conference: 9th MLSNP: 15th
- MLS Next Pro playoffs: DNQ
- Top goalscorer: League: Jorge Alastuey (10 goals); All: Jorge Alastuey (10 goals)
- Biggest win: ATX 4–1 LAF (7/4) (MLSNP)
- Biggest defeat: VAN 4–0 ATX (4/12) (MLSNP)
| Home colors | Away colors |
- All statistics correct as of 022:37, October 5, 2025 (UTC).

The 2025 Austin FC II season was the club's third season in MLS Next Pro, the third tier of soccer in the United States. They played in the league's Western Conference. Austin FC II finished in 12th place in the Western Conference and 24th overall in the 2024 MLS Next Pro season.

== Background ==
Austin FC started playing in the MLS Western Conference in 2021. In August 2022 it was announced that they would launch a MLS Next Pro team for the 2023 season. On December 13, 2022, Austin FC announced that Brett Uttley will be the first coach for Austin FC II. Austin FC II first season was the 2023 season, where they finished the season 2nd in the Western Conference and went on to win the 2023 MLS Next Pro Cup.

== Season ==
=== Preseason ===
Austin FC II announced its initial squad on January 23, 2025. Returning players for the 2025 season were Marcus Alstrup, Rubén Bonachera, Antonio Gomez, Nico Van Rijn, Anthony De Anda, Ervin Torres, Diego Abarca, Anthony García, and Peter Grogan. On January 9, 2025, Austin FC II signed duel national forward Vlad Dǎnciuțiu who represents Romanian U-19 national team and most recently played for the Udinese U-20 team. On January 20, 2025, Austin FC II signed signed Spanish midfielder Jorge Alastuey who had played most recently with ŁKS Łódź. On February 7, 2025, Austin FC II announced the signing of Polish defender Daniel Cieśla from Nieciecza. On February 13, Austin FC II announced the signing of defender Riley Thomas and forward Patrick Gryczewski, the 2025 MLS SuperDraft picks of Austin FC. On February 26, Austin FC II announced the signing of midfielder Adrián González through the 2026 season, with a one-year option. On March 5, Austin FC II announced the signing of defender Jules Bery through the 2026 season with a one-year option. Prior to the first game of the season, Austin FC II announced their final pre–season roster moves. Goalkeeper Aaron Cervantes re–signed with the team for the 2025 season with a one–year option. Midfielder Micah Burton, forward Jimmy Farkarlun, and forward CJ Fodrey were loaned from the first team for the 2025 season. Forwards Chris Avila, Joah Reyna, midfielders Mo Badawiya, Damian Perez, and Jackson Stephans, defenders Isaac Brown–Samper, Lucas Cavalcante, Santiago Maynez, Mason Miller, and Chey Moreno, and goalkeeper Cooper Roney were signed to amateur agreements for the 2025 season.

=== March/April ===
Austin FC II started their 2025 season with a strong performance against Colorado Rapids 2, winning 4–2 with four different players scoring their first goals of the season. Headed into the second game of the season, Austin FC II announced two more academy players had signed amateur agreements. Goalkeeper Nico Aristizábal and forward David Santos were added to the roster for the 2025 season. Short two starters, who were called up to the first team, Austin FC II fell 0–1 to Minnesota United FC 2 in a hard-fought match at Parmer Field. On March 20, Austin FC II announced they had signed midfielder Djakaria Barro from Mallorca B. Barro signed though the 2026 season with a one-year option. In their first road game of the season, Austin visiting St. Louis City 2, earning a hard-fought point in a 0–0 draw, but dropped the potential second point, falling 5–4 in the shootout. Austin hosted North Texas at Parmer field, earning a 1–1, but dropped a point in the shootout, falling 2–4 to their instate rivals. Traveling north of the border, Austin visited Whitecaps FC 2, suffering their worse loss of the season, falling 0–4 at full time. Returning from Canada, Austin had their second in-state game against Houston Dynamo 2, falling 1–2.

=== May/June ===
Austin started the month of May at home with a matchup against Sporting Kansas City II, earning a 0–0 draw, and gaining a second point, with a 7–6 shootout. After a two-week break in games, Austin travelled to the west coast for a match against Ventura County FC, earning a 1–0 win on a second have goal by Farkarlun. Returning home, Austin hosted Minnesota United FC 2, drawing 1–1 on a goal by Peter Grogan. They earned their second point by winning the shootout 4–2."Austin FC II Takes Two Points from Home Meeting with Minnesota". Van Rijn Scores First Austin Goal in Draw with Dynamo 2. May 23, 2025. Austin dropped a point against Houston with a 1–1 draw on a goal by van Rijn, but fell in the shootout 3–4. Austin then went on the road and lost 0–1 to Colorado. Next Austin travelled to North Texas, earning a 2–1 against their in-state rivals. Continuing their road stretch, Austin went into Portland and grabbed two points on a 1–1 draw and then a 5–4 shootout win. Austin finally returned home and earned a 1–0 win over Kansas City. On the last day of the month Austin announced that they had reached a mutual agreement releasing Nico van Rijn.

=== July/August ===
On July 3, Austin announced the signing of free agent American midfielder Marcel Ruszel, who spent the last season playing with Polish side Stal Stalowa Wola. The following day, Austin had their best game of the season, beating LAFC 2, 4–1 on goals by Fodrey, Grogan, Torres, and Burton. On July 7, Austin announced they terminated Anthony De Anda's contract. The following day, Austin announced they had signed Mo Badawiya to an MLS Next Pro contract after he made seven appearances on his amateur agreement. Badawiya is signed through the 2027 season with two option years. St. Louis City SC 2 came into Austin on a seven-game win streak. Austin fell 2–4, to St. Louis, which was an MLSNext Pro record eighth win for St. Louis. Goals for Austin were scored by Torres and Alastuey. July 25th, Austin announced the signing of Turkish American defender Batuhan Arıcı from Ümraniyespor. Arıcı is signed through the 2026 season, with a one-year option. Later that evening, Austin earned a 2–0 win against cross–state Houston on Vlad Dănciuțiu's first goal of the season and a second half own–goal on an Austin corner kick. Austin earned another three points on the road, moving up to 4th place in the West, beating Kansas City 3-1 on a brace by Alastuey, and goal by Dănciuțiu. Austin earned a point on an extra-time goal by Alastuey, drawing with North Texas 1–1, but dropped a point in the penalty shoot–out 5–6. Austin had one of their worst showing of the year on the road, losing 1–4 to the Rapids 2. Torres scored the lone goal for Austin. Waiting late in the game, Austin scored a stoppage time winner for a 2–1 victory over Ventura County. Goals were scored by Burton and Abraca. Austin closed out the month of August with a loss on the road, falling 0–1 to LAFC.

=== September/October ===
With Burton, Farkarlun, and Torres out on national duty, Austin fell 1–0 to Minnesota on the road, in a match that saw Grogan and Bonachera earn red cards in the loss. With all players back from the international break, Austin travelled to Tacoma, earning a 2–1 win, keeping their post–season hopes alive. Goas were scored by Barro, his first of the year and team leader Alastuey. With the playoffs in reach, Austin fell to St. Louis 1–2 at home, with a goal from Alastuey, who also earned a second half red card. Austin got a fast start with an early goal by Farkarlun, but fell 1–2 to Portland, putting the playoff hopes on the result of their final game of the season. Austin finished their season on the road fighting for the final spot in the Western Conference playoffs, earning a 2–1 win against Towne FC, but North Texas' win kept Austin in the 9th place spot in the conference, just missing the final playoff spot.

== Management team ==
| Position | Name |
|---|---|
| Chairman | (United States) Anthony Precourt |
| Sporting Director | Rodolfo Borrell |
| Head coach | (United States) Brett Uttley |
| Goalkeeping coach | (United States) Peter Davis |

== Roster ==
As of October 5, 2025.

| No. | Name | Nationality | Position(s) | Date of birth (age) | Signed in | Previous club | Apps | Goals |
Goalkeepers
| 1 | Marcus Alstrup | (Denmark) | Goalkeeper | March 24, 2004 (age 22) | 2024 | (Denmark) B93 | 7 | 0 |
| 12 | Charlie Farrar | (England) | Goalkeeper | (age 22) | 2025 | (United States) UNC Asheville | 20 | 0 |
| 30 | Stefan Cleveland | (United States) | Goalkeeper | May 25, 1994 (age 32) | 2025 | (United States) Austin FC | 1 | 0 |
| 30 | Nico Aritizábal | (Puerto Rico) | Goalkeeper | May 2, 2008 (age 18) | 2025 | (United States) Austin FC Academy | 0 | 0 |
| 40 | Cooper Roney | (United States) | Goalkeeper | | 2025 | (United States) Austin FC Academy | 0 | 0 |
Defenders
| 2 | Riley Thomas | (United States) | DF | March 15, 2002 (age 24) | 2025 | (United States) North Carolina | 21 | 0 |
| 3 | Rubén Bonachera | (Spain) | DF | November 27, 2003 (age 22) | 2024 | (Poland) Wisła Kraków II | 21 | 1 |
| 4 | Antonio Gomez | (United States) | DF | December 15, 2001 (age 24) | 2024 | (United States) Cal Baptist University | 25 | 0 |
| 33 | Santiago Maynez | (United States) | DF | March 15, 2007 (age 19) | 2024 | (United States) Austin FC Academy | 1 | 0 |
| 34 | Daniel Cieśla | (Poland) | DF | January 7, 2005 (age 21) | 2025 | (Poland) Nieciecza | 24 | 0 |
| 35 | Chuy Moreno | (United States) | DF | | 2025 | (United States) Austin FC Academy | 7 | 0 |
| 38 | Lucas Cavalcante | (United States) | DF | | 2025 | (United States) Austin FC Academy | 0 | 0 |
| 41 | Jules Bery | (France) | DF | January 4, 2004 (age 22) | 2025 | (France) Monaco U–21 | 15 | 0 |
| 42 | Isaac Brown–Samper | (United States) | DF | February 7, 2007 (age 19) | 2025 | (United States) Austin FC Academy | 0 | 0 |
| | Mason Miller | (United States) | DF | January 16, 2007 (age 19) | 2024 | (United States) Austin FC Academy | 0 | 0 |
| | Nico Van Rijn | (Spain) | DF | March 26, 2001 (age 25) | 2024 | (Spain) Recreativo Granada | 12 | 1 |
| | Anthony De Anda | (United States) | DF | May 5, 2005 (age 21) | 2023 | (United States) Austin FC Academy | 11 | 0 |
Midfielders
| 6 | Adrián González | (Mexico) | MF | June 23, 2003 (age 22) | 2025 | (United States) Columbus Crew 2 | 27 | 0 |
| 7 | Batuhan Arıcı | (Turkey) | MF | January 20, 2003 (age 23) | 2025 | (Turkey) Ümraniyespor | 4 | 0 |
| 8 | Ervin Torres | (United States) | MF | November 14, 2007 (age 18) | 2023 | (United States) Austin FC Academy | 25 | 4 |
| 10 | Jorge Alastuey | (Spain) | MF | May 14, 2003 (age 23) | 2025 | (Poland) ŁKS Łódź | 24 | 10 |
| 14 | Djakaria Barro | (Ivory Coast) | MF | January 12, 2002 (age 24) | 2025 | (Spain) RCD Mallorca B | 19 | 1 |
| 21 | Marcel Ruszel | (United States) | MF | June 21, 2004 (age 21) | 2025 | (Poland) Stal Stalowa Wola | 6 | 0 |
| 27 | Mo Badawiya | (United States) | MF | November 14, 2007 (age 18) | 2025 | (United States) Austin FC Academy | 11 | 0 |
| 32 | Micah Burton | (United States) | MF | March 26, 2006 (age 20) | 2023 | (United States) Austin FC | 22 | 4 |
| 37 | Damion Perez | (United States) | MF | | 2025 | (United States) Austin FC Academy | 0 | 0 |
| 44 | Jackson Stephens | (United States) | MF | | 2025 | (United States) Austin FC Academy | 0 | 0 |
| 77 | Diego Abarca | (United States) | MF | June 19, 2005 (age 20) | 2024 | (United States) El Paso Locomotive FC | 26 | 1 |
Forward
| 9 | Peter Grogan | (Republic of Ireland) | FW | January 25, 2005 (age 21) | 2024 | (Republic of Ireland) Bray Wanderers | 25 | 4 |
| 11 | Patrick Gryczewski | (United States) | FW | March 25, 2003 (age 23) | 2025 | (United States) Rhode Islands | 2 | 0 |
| 17 | Vlad Dănciuțiu | (Romania) | FW | July 11, 2006 (age 19) | 2025 | (Italy) Udinese U-20 | 21 | 2 |
| 19 | CJ Fodrey | (United States) | FW | February 10, 2004 (age 22) | 2023 | (United States) Austin FC | 5 | 1 |
| 26 | Jimmy Farkarlun | (Liberia) | FW | July 14, 2001 (age 24) | 2024 | (United States) Austin FC | 22 | 5 |
| 31 | Chris Avila | (United States) | FW | | 2025 | (United States) Austin FC Academy | 16 | 0 |
| 36 | Joah Reyna | (United States) | FW | February 26, 2007 (age 19) | 2024 | (United States) Austin FC Academy | 0 | 0 |
| 45 | David Santos | (United States) | FW | | 2025 | (United States) Austin FC Academy | 0 | 0 |

== Transfers ==
=== In ===
| Date | Position | No. | Name | From | Fee | Ref. |
|---|---|---|---|---|---|---|
| January 9, 2025 | FW | 17 | (Romania) Vlad Dǎnciuțiu | (Italy) Udinese U-20 | Free | |
| January 20, 2025 | MF | 10 | (Spain) Jorge Alastuey | (Poland) LKS Lodz | Free | |
| February 7, 2025 | MF | 34 | (Poland) Daniel Cieśla | (Poland) Nieciecza | Free | |
| February 13, 2025 | DF | 2 | (United States) Riley Thomas | (United States) North Carolina | Draft | |
| February 13, 2025 | FW | 11 | (United States) Patrick Gryczewski | (United States) Rhode Islands | Draft | |
| February 26, 2025 | FW | 6 | (Mexico) Adrián González | (United States) Columbus Crew 2 | Free | |
| February 26, 2025 | DF | 21 | (France) Jules Bery | (France) Monaco U–21 | Free | |
| February 26, 2025 | GK | 20 | (United States) Aaron Cervantes | (United States) Ventura County FC | Free | |
| March 20, 2025 | MF | 14 | (Ivory Coast) Djakaria Barro | (Spain) RCD Mallorca B | Free | |
| April 29, 2025 | GK | 12 | (England) Charlie Farrar | (United States) UNC Asheville | Free | |
| July 3, 2025 | MF | 21 | (United States) Marcel Ruszel | (Poland) Stal Stalowa Wola | Free | |
| July 8, 2025 | MF | 27 | (United States) Mo Badawiya | (United States) Austin FC Academy | Free | |
| July 25, 2025 | DF | 7 | (Turkey) Batuhan Arıcı | (Turkey) Ümraniyespor | Free | |

=== Loan In ===
| No. | Pos. | Player | Loaned from | Start | End | Source |
|---|---|---|---|---|---|---|
| 32 | MF | (United States) Micah Burton | (United States) Austin FC | March 7, 2025 | December 31, 2025 | |
| 26 | FW | (Liberia) Jimmy Farkarlun | (United States) Austin FC | March 7, 2025 | December 31, 2025 | |
| 19 | FW | (United States) CJ Fodrey | (United States) Austin FC | March 7, 2025 | December 31, 2025 | |
| 2 | DF | (United States) Riley Thomas | (United States) Austin FC | April 11, 2025 | December 31, 2025 | |
| 30 | GK | (United States) Stefan Cleveland | (United States) Austin FC | April 27, 2025 | December 31, 2025 | |

=== Amateur agreements ===
| No. | Pos. | Player | Loaned from | Start | End | Source |
|---|---|---|---|---|---|---|
| 31 | FW | (United States) Chris Avila | (United States) Austin FC Academy | March 7, 2025 | December 31, 2025 | |
| 27 | MF | (United States) Mo Badawiya | (United States) Austin FC Academy | March 7, 2025 | June 7, 2025 | |
| 42 | DF | (United States) Isaac Brown-Samper | (United States) Austin FC Academy | March 7, 2025 | December 31, 2025 | |
| 38 | DF | (United States) Lucas Cavalcante | (United States) Austin FC Academy | March 7, 2025 | December 31, 2025 | |
| 33 | DF | (United States) Santiago Maynez | (United States) Austin FC Academy | March 7, 2025 | December 31, 2025 | |
| 35 | DF | (United States) Mason Miller | (United States) Austin FC Academy | March 7, 2025 | December 31, 2025 | |
| 43 | DF | (United States) Chuy Moreno | (United States) Austin FC Academy | March 7, 2025 | December 31, 2025 | |
| 37 | MF | (United States) Damion Perez | (United States) Austin FC Academy | March 7, 2025 | December 31, 2025 | |
| 36 | FW | (United States) Joah Reyna | (United States) Austin FC Academy | March 7, 2025 | December 31, 2025 | |
| 40 | GK | (United States) Cooper Roney | (United States) Austin FC Academy | March 7, 2025 | December 31, 2025 | |
| 44 | MF | (United States) Jackson Stephens | (United States) Austin FC Academy | March 7, 2025 | December 31, 2025 | |
| 30 | GK | (Puerto Rico) Nico Aristizábal | (United States) Austin FC Academy | March 13, 2025 | December 31, 2025 | |
| 45 | FW | (United States) David Santos | (United States) Austin FC Academy | March 13, 2025 | December 31, 2025 | |

=== Out ===
| Date | Position | No. | Name | To | Type | Fee | Ref. |
|---|---|---|---|---|---|---|---|
| December 31, 2024 | DF | 2 | (Netherlands) Cheick Touré | | End of Contract | N/A | |
| December 31, 2024 | DF | 5 | (Canada) Salvatore Mazzaferro | (United States) Atlanta United 2 | End of Contract | N/A | |
| December 31, 2024 | MF | 8 | (Haiti) Steeve Louis Jean | (United States) Charlotte FC | Option not exercised | N/A | |
| December 31, 2024 | FW | 9 | (Peru) Sébastien Pineau | (Spain) Recreativo Huelva | Option not exercised | N/A | |
| December 31, 2024 | FW | 14 | (United States) Jonathan Santillan | (Mexico) Club Necaxa II | Option not exercised | N/A | |
| December 31, 2024 | MF | 17 | (United States) Bryan Arellano | (United States) Sporting Kansas City II | Option not exercised | N/A | |
| December 31, 2024 | GK | 20 | (United States) Aaron Cervantes | (United States) Austin FC II | End of Contract | N/A | |
| April 3, 2025 | FW | 7 | (Mexico) Anthony García | | Mutual agreement | N/A | |
| April 11, 2025 | DF | 2 | (United States) Riley Thomas | (United States) Austin FC | Free transfer | N/A | |
| April 16, 2025 | GK | 20 | (United States) Aaron Cervantes | | Mutual agreement | N/A | |
| June 30, 2025 | DF | 5 | (Spain) Nico Van Rijn | (Spain) Teruel | Mutual agreement | | |
| July 7, 2025 | DF | 25 | (United States) Anthony De Anda | | Contract termination | | |

== Non-competitive fixtures ==
=== Preseason ===
| Win | SOW | SOL | Loss |

| Date | Opponent | Venue | Location | Result (Note: Austin FC II's score written first) | Scorers |
|---|---|---|---|---|---|
| January 25 | San Antonio SC | Parmer Field | Austin, Texas | 8–0 | |
| February 1 | Houston Christian University | Parmer Field | Austin, Texas | | |
| February 8 | University Incarnate Word | Parmer Field | Austin, Texas | | |
| February 15 | Huntsville City FC | Parmer Field | Austin, Texas | | |
| February 19 | TBD | Parmer Field | Austin, Texas | | |
| February 22 | Houston Dynamo 2 | Parmer Field | Austin, Texas | | |
| March 1 | Texoma FC | Parmer Field | Austin, Texas | | |

== Competitive fixtures ==
=== Major League Soccer Regular Season ===
==== Standings ====
===== Western Conference =====
| Pos | Div | Team | Pld | W | SOW | SOL | L | GF | GA | GD | Pts | Qualification |
|---|---|---|---|---|---|---|---|---|---|---|---|---|
| 7 | PC | Whitecaps FC 2 | 28 | 11 | 4 | 1 | 12 | 61 | 54 | +7 | 42 | Qualification for the Playoffs |
| 8 | PC | Ventura County FC | 28 | 11 | 2 | 4 | 11 | 48 | 51 | −3 | 41 | Qualification for the Playoffs |
| 9 | FR | Austin FC II | 28 | 10 | 3 | 5 | 10 | 35 | 36 | −1 | 41 | |
| 10 | PC | Portland Timbers 2 | 28 | 10 | 2 | 4 | 12 | 47 | 54 | −7 | 38 | |
| 11 | FR | Houston Dynamo 2 | 28 | 9 | 4 | 2 | 13 | 40 | 47 | −7 | 37 | |

Source: MLSNP
Rules for classification: 1) points; 2) total regulation wins; 3) total goal differential; 4) total goals scored; 5) total shootout wins; 6) away goal differential; 7) away goals scored; 8) home goals differential; 9) home goals scored; 10) fewer disciplinary points; 11) drawing of lots

===== Overall =====
| Pos | Div | Team | Pld | W | SOW | SOL | L | GF | GA | GD | Pts |
|---|---|---|---|---|---|---|---|---|---|---|---|
| 13 | PC | Whitecaps FC 2 | 28 | 11 | 4 | 1 | 12 | 61 | 54 | +7 | 42 |
| 14 | PC | Ventura County FC | 28 | 11 | 2 | 4 | 11 | 48 | 51 | −3 | 41 |
| 15 | FR | Austin FC II | 28 | 10 | 3 | 5 | 10 | 35 | 36 | −1 | 41 |
| 16 | NE | FC Cincinnati 2 | 28 | 9 | 7 | 0 | 12 | 40 | 41 | −1 | 41 |
| 17 | SE | Carolina Core FC | 28 | 8 | 5 | 5 | 10 | 42 | 44 | −2 | 39 |

Source: MLSNP
Rules for classification: 1) points; 2) total regulation wins; 3) total goal differential; 4) total goals scored; 5) total shootout wins; 6) away goal differential; 7) away goals scored; 8) home goals differential; 9) home goals scored; 10) fewer disciplinary points; 11) drawing of lots

==== Matches ====
| Win | SOW | SOL | Loss |

| Matchday | Date | Opponent | Venue | Location | Result (Note: Austin FC II's score written first) | Scorers |
|---|---|---|---|---|---|---|
| 1 | March 7 | Colorado Rapids 2 | Parmer Field | Austin, Texas | 4–2 | Farkarlun 3'; Torres 18'; Alastuey 25; Grogan 32' |
| 2 | March 14 | Minnesota United FC 2 | Parmer Field | Austin, Texas | 0–1 | |
| 3 | March 30 | St. Louis City 2 | Energizer Park | St. Louis, Missouri | 0–0 (4–5 p) | |
| 4 | April 11 | North Texas SC | Parmer Field | Austin, Texas | 1–1 (2–4 p) | Grogan 28' |
| 5 | April 19 | Whitecaps FC 2 | Swangard Stadium | Burnaby, Canada | 0–4 | |
| 6 | April 27 | Houston Dynamo 2 | SaberCats Stadium | Houston, Texas | 1–2 | Bonachera 90+1' |
| 7 | May 2 | Sporting Kansas City II | Parmer Field | Austin, Texas | 0–0 (7–6 p) | |
| 8 | May 13 | Ventura County FC | William Rolland Stadium | Thousand Oaks, California | 1–0 | Farkarlun 69' |
| 9 | May 23 | Minnesota United FC 2 | Parmer Field | Austin, Texas | 1–1 (4–2 p) | Grogan 25' |
| 10 | May 30 | Houston Dynamo 2 | Parmer Field | Austin, Texas | 1–1 (3–4 p) | Van Rijn 44' |
| 11 | June 8 | Colorado Rapids 2 | Denver Soccer Stadium | Denver, Colorado | 0–1 | |
| 12 | June 14 | North Texas SC | Choctaw Stadium | Arlington, Texas | 2–1 | Alastuey 32 (pen); Burton 71' |
| 13 | June 20 | Portland Timbers 2 | Providence Park | Portland, Oregon | 1–1(5–4 p) | Burton 77' |
| 14 | June 27 | Sporting Kansas City II | Parmer Field | Austin, Texas | 1–0 | Alastuey 51' |
| 15 | July 4 | Los Angeles FC 2 | Parmer Field | Austin, Texas | 4–1 | Fodrey 6'; Grogan 22'; Torres 68'; Burton 75' |
| 16 | July 11 | St. Louis City 2 | Parmer Field | Austin, Texas | 2–4 | Torres 79'; Alastuey 90+4' |
| 17 | July 20 | Real Monarchs | Zions Bank Stadium | Herriman, Utah | 1–1 (4–5 p) | Farkarlun 65' |
| 18 | July 25 | Houston Dynamo 2 | Parmer Field | Austin, Texas | 2–0 | Dănciuțiu 35'; Own goal 41' |
| 19 | August 3 | Sporting Kansas City II | Children's Mercy Victory Field | Kansas City, Missouri | 3–1 | Alastuey 10', 72'; Dănciuțiu 32' |
| 20 | August 8 | North Texas SC | Parmer Field | Austin, Texas | 1–1 (5–6 p) | Alastuey 90+1' |
| 21 | August 15 | Colorado Rapids 2 | CIBER Field | Denver, Colorado | 1–4 | Torres 65' |
| 22 | August 22 | Ventura County FC | Parmer Field | Austin, Texas | 2–1 | Burton 35'; Abarca 90+1' |
| 23 | August 29 | Los Angeles FC 2 | Titan Stadium | Fullerton, California | 0–1 | |
| 24 | September 5 | Minnesota United FC 2 | National Sports Center | Blaine, Minnesota | 0–1 | |
| 25 | September 12 | Tacoma Defiance | Starfire Sports | Tukwila, Washington | 2–1 | Barro 30'; Alastuey 76' |
| 26 | September 19 | St. Louis City 2 | Parmer Field | Austin, Texas | 1–2 | Alastuey 34' |
| 27 | September 26 | Portland Timbers 2 | Parmer Field | Austin, Texas | 1-2 | Farkarlun 12' |
| 28 | October 5 | The Town FC | Saint Mary's College | Moraga, California | 2–1 | Farkarlun 43'; Alastuey 80' |

== Statistics ==
=== Appearances and goals ===
Numbers after plus–sign (+) denote appearances as a substitute.

| No. | Pos | Nat | Player | Total | | MLSNP | | MLSNP Playoffs | |
| No. | Pos | Nat | Player | Apps | Goals | Apps | Goals | Apps | Goals |
|---|---|---|---|---|---|---|---|---|---|
| 1 | GK | (Denmark) DEN | Marcus Alstrub | 7 | 0 | 7+0 | 0 | 0+0 | 0 |
| 2 | DF | (United States) USA | Riley Thomas | 21 | 0 | 21+0 | 0 | 0+0 | 0 |
| 3 | DF | (Spain) ESP | Rubén Bonachera | 22 | 1 | 19+3 | 1 | 0+0 | 0 |
| 4 | DF | (United States) USA | Antonio Gomez | 25 | 0 | 25+0 | 0 | 0+0 | 0 |
| 5 | DF | (Spain) ESP | Nico Van Rijn | 12 | 1 | 12+0 | 1 | 0+0 | 0 |
| 6 | MF | (Mexico) MEX | Adrián González | 27 | 0 | 24+3 | 0 | 0+0 | 0 |
| 7 | DF | (Turkey) TUR | Batuhan Arıcı | 4 | 0 | 0+4 | 0 | 0+0 | 0 |
| 8 | MF | (United States) USA | Ervin Torres | 25 | 4 | 22+3 | 4 | 0+0 | 0 |
| 9 | FW | (Republic of Ireland) IRL | Peter Grogan | 25 | 4 | 12+13 | 4 | 0+0 | 0 |
| 10 | MF | (Spain) ESP | Jorge Alastuey | 24 | 10 | 23+1 | 10 | 0+0 | 0 |
| 11 | FW | (United States) USA | Patrick Gryczewski | 2 | 0 | 0+2 | 0 | 0+0 | 0 |
| 12 | GK | (England) ENG | Charlie Farrar | 20 | 0 | 20+0 | 0 | 0+0 | 0 |
| 14 | MF | (Ivory Coast) CIV | Djakaria Barro | 18 | 1 | 17+1 | 1 | 0+0 | 0 |
| 17 | FW | (Romania) ROU | Vlad Dǎnciuțiu | 21 | 2 | 11+10 | 2 | 0+0 | 0 |
| 19 | FW | (United States) USA | CJ Fodrey | 5 | 1 | 5+0 | 1 | 0+0 | 0 |
| 25 | DF | (United States) USA | Anthony De Anda | 11 | 0 | 5+6 | 0 | 0+0 | 0 |
| 26 | FW | (Liberia) LBR | Jimmy Farkarlun | 22 | 5 | 21+1 | 5 | 0+0 | 0 |
| 27 | MF | (United States) USA | Mo Badawiya | 10 | 0 | 1+9 | 0 | 0+0 | 0 |
| 30 | GK | (United States) USA | Stefan Cleveland | 1 | 0 | 1+0 | 0 | 0+0 | 0 |
| 30 | GK | (Puerto Rico) PUR | Nico Aristizábal | 0 | 0 | 0+0 | 0 | 0+0 | 0 |
| 31 | FW | (United States) USA | Chris Avila | 16 | 0 | 0+16 | 0 | 0+0 | 0 |
| 32 | MF | (United States) USA | Micah Burton | 22 | 4 | 14+8 | 4 | 0+0 | 0 |
| 33 | DF | (United States) USA | Santiago Maynez | 1 | 0 | 0+1 | 0 | 0+0 | 0 |
| 34 | DF | (Poland) POL | Daniel Cieśla | 24 | 0 | 16+8 | 0 | 0+0 | 0 |
| 35 | DF | (United States) USA | Mason Miller | 0 | 0 | 0+0 | 0 | 0+0 | 0 |
| 36 | FW | (United States) USA | Joah Reyna | 0 | 0 | 0+0 | 0 | 0+0 | 0 |
| 37 | MF | (United States) USA | Damion Perez | 0 | 0 | 0+0 | 0 | 0+0 | 0 |
| 38 | DF | (United States) USA | Lucas Cavalcante | 0 | 0 | 0+0 | 0 | 0+0 | 0 |
| 40 | GK | (United States) USA | Cooper Roney | 0 | 0 | 0+0 | 0 | 0+0 | 0 |
| 41 | DF | (France) FRA | Jules Bery | 15 | 0 | 14+1 | 0 | 0+0 | 0 |
| 42 | DF | (United States) USA | Isaac Brown-Samper | 0 | 0 | 0+0 | 0 | 0+0 | 0 |
| 43 | DF | (United States) USA | Chuy Moreno | 6 | 0 | 3+3 | 0 | 0+0 | 0 |
| 44 | MF | (United States) USA | Jackson Stephens | 0 | 0 | 0+0 | 0 | 0+0 | 0 |
| 45 | FW | (United States) USA | David Santos | 0 | 0 | 0+0 | 0 | 0+0 | 0 |
| 77 | MF | (United States) USA | Diego Abarca | 27 | 1 | 16+11 | 1 | 0+0 | 0 |

- Last updated: October 5, 2025
- Source: https://www.mlsnextpro.com/stats/players/#season=2025&competition=mls-next-pro&club=20220&statType=general&position=all

=== Top scorers ===
| Rank | Position | Number | Name | MLSNP | MLSNP Playoffs | Total |
|---|---|---|---|---|---|---|
| 1 | MF | 10 | (Spain) Jorge Alastuey | 10 | 0 | 10 |
| 2 | FW | 26 | (Liberia) Jimmy Farkarlun | 5 | 0 | 5 |
| 3 | MF | 8 | (United States) Ervin Torres | 4 | 0 | 4 |
| 3 | FW | 9 | (Republic of Ireland) Peter Grogan | 4 | 0 | 4 |
| 3 | MF | 32 | (United States) Micah Burton | 4 | 0 | 4 |
| 6 | FW | 17 | (Romania) Vlad Dănciuțiu | 2 | 0 | 2 |
| 7 | DF | 3 | (Spain) Rubén Bonachera | 1 | 0 | 1 |
| 7 | DF | 5 | (Spain) Nico Van Rijn | 1 | 0 | 1 |
| 7 | MF | 14 | (Ivory Coast) Djakaria Barro | 1 | 0 | 1 |
| 7 | FW | 19 | (United States) CJ Fodrey | 1 | 0 | 1 |
| 7 | MF | 77 | (United States) Diego Abarca | 1 | 0 | 1 |
| Total | | | | 33 | 0 | 33 |

- Last updated: October 5, 2025
- Source: https://www.mlsnextpro.com/stats/players/#season=2025&competition=mls-next-pro&club=20220&statType=general&position=all

=== Top assists ===
| Rank | Position | Number | Name | MLSNP | MLSNP Playoffs | Total |
|---|---|---|---|---|---|---|
| 1 | MF | 10 | (Spain) Jorge Alastuey | 7 | 0 | 6 |
| 2 | MF | 8 | (United States) Ervin Torres | 5 | 0 | 5 |
| 2 | FW | 26 | (Liberia) Jimmy Farkarlun | 5 | 0 | 5 |
| 4 | MF | 32 | (United States) Micah Burton | 4 | 0 | 4 |
| 5 | DF | 6 | (Mexico) Adrián González | 3 | 0 | 3 |
| 5 | MF | 14 | (Ivory Coast) Djakaria Barro | 3 | 0 | 3 |
| 5 | MF | 77 | (United States) Diego Abarca | 3 | 0 | 3 |
| 8 | DF | 3 | (Spain) Rubén Bonachera | 2 | 0 | 2 |
| 8 | FW | 9 | (Republic of Ireland) Peter Grogan | 2 | 0 | 2 |
| 10 | DF | 2 | (United States) Riley Thomas | 1 | 0 | 1 |
| 10 | FW | 19 | (United States) CJ Fodrey | 1 | 0 | 1 |
| 10 | DF | 34 | (Poland) Daniel Cieśla | 1 | 0 | 1 |
| 10 | DF | 43 | (United States) Chuy Moreno | 1 | 0 | 1 |
| Total | | | | 38 | 0 | 38 |

- Last updated: October 5, 2025
- Source: https://www.mlsnextpro.com/stats/players/#season=2025&competition=mls-next-pro&club=20220&statType=general&position=all

=== Clean sheets ===
| Rank | Number | Name | MLSNP | MLSNP Playoffs | Total |
|---|---|---|---|---|---|
| 1 | 12 | (England) Charlie Farrar | 3 | 0 | 3 |
| 2 | 1 | (Denmark) Marcus Alstrup | 1 | 0 | 1 |
| Total | | | 4 | 0 | 4 |

- Last updated: October 5, 2025
- Source: https://www.mlsnextpro.com/stats/players/#season=2024&competition=mls-next-pro&club=20220&statType=general&position=all

=== Disciplinary record ===
| No. | Pos. | Player | MLSNP | | | MLSNP Playoffs | | | Total | | |
| No. | Pos. | Player | Booked | (yellow card) (yellow-red card) | Sent off (straight red) | Booked | (yellow card) (yellow-red card) | Sent off (straight red) | Booked | (yellow card) (yellow-red card) | Sent off (straight red) |
| 1 | GK | (Denmark) Marcus Alstrup | 0 | 0 | 0 | 0 | 0 | 0 | 0 | 0 | 0 |
| 2 | DF | (United States) Riley Thomas | 3 | 0 | 0 | 0 | 0 | 0 | 3 | 0 | 0 |
| 3 | DF | (Spain) Rubén Bonachera | 1 | 0 | 1 | 0 | 0 | 0 | 1 | 0 | 1 |
| 4 | DF | (United States) Antonio Gomez | 3 | 0 | 0 | 0 | 0 | 0 | 3 | 0 | 0 |
| 5 | DF | (Spain) Nico Van Rijn | 3 | 0 | 1 | 0 | 0 | 0 | 3 | 0 | 1 |
| 6 | MF | (Mexico) Adrián González | 7 | 0 | 0 | 0 | 0 | 0 | 7 | 0 | 0 |
| 7 | MF | (Turkey) Batuhan Arıcı | 2 | 0 | 0 | 0 | 0 | 0 | 2 | 0 | 0 |
| 8 | MF | (United States) Ervin Torres | 3 | 0 | 0 | 0 | 0 | 0 | 3 | 0 | 0 |
| 9 | FW | (Republic of Ireland) Peter Grogan | 4 | 1 | 1 | 0 | 0 | 0 | 4 | 1 | 1 |
| 10 | MF | (Spain) Jorge Alastuey | 6 | 1 | 0 | 0 | 0 | 0 | 6 | 1 | 0 |
| 11 | FW | (United States) Patrick Gryczewski | 0 | 0 | 0 | 0 | 0 | 0 | 0 | 0 | 0 |
| 12 | GK | (England) Charlie Farrar | 1 | 0 | 0 | 0 | 0 | 0 | 1 | 0 | 0 |
| 14 | MF | (Ivory Coast) Djakaria Barro | 5 | 0 | 0 | 0 | 0 | 0 | 5 | 0 | 0 |
| 17 | FW | (Romania) Vlad Dǎnciuțiu | 4 | 0 | 0 | 0 | 0 | 0 | 4 | 0 | 0 |
| 19 | FW | (United States) CJ Fodrey | 2 | 0 | 0 | 0 | 0 | 0 | 2 | 0 | 0 |
| 25 | DF | (United States) Anthony De Anda | 6 | 0 | 0 | 0 | 0 | 0 | 6 | 0 | 0 |
| 26 | FW | (Liberia) Jimmy Farkarlun | 1 | 0 | 0 | 0 | 0 | 0 | 1 | 0 | 0 |
| 27 | MF | (United States) Mo Badawiya | 0 | 0 | 0 | 0 | 0 | 0 | 0 | 0 | 0 |
| 30 | GK | (Puerto Rico) Nico Aristizábal | 0 | 0 | 0 | 0 | 0 | 0 | 0 | 0 | 0 |
| 31 | FW | (United States) Chris Avila | 0 | 0 | 0 | 0 | 0 | 0 | 0 | 0 | 0 |
| 32 | MF | (United States) Micah Burton | 2 | 0 | 0 | 0 | 0 | 0 | 2 | 0 | 0 |
| 33 | DF | (United States) Santiago Maynez | 0 | 0 | 0 | 0 | 0 | 0 | 0 | 0 | 0 |
| 34 | DF | (Poland) Daniel Cieśla | 5 | 0 | 0 | 0 | 0 | 0 | 5 | 0 | 0 |
| 35 | DF | (United States) Mason Miller | 0 | 0 | 0 | 0 | 0 | 0 | 0 | 0 | 0 |
| 36 | FW | (United States) Joah Reyna | 0 | 0 | 0 | 0 | 0 | 0 | 0 | 0 | 0 |
| 37 | MF | (United States) Damion Perez | 0 | 0 | 0 | 0 | 0 | 0 | 0 | 0 | 0 |
| 38 | DF | (United States) Lucas Cavalcante | 0 | 0 | 0 | 0 | 0 | 0 | 0 | 0 | 0 |
| 40 | GK | (United States) Cooper Roney | 0 | 0 | 0 | 0 | 0 | 0 | 0 | 0 | 0 |
| 41 | DF | (France) Jules Bery | 2 | 0 | 0 | 0 | 0 | 0 | 2 | 0 | 0 |
| 42 | DF | (United States) Isaac Brown-Samper | 0 | 0 | 0 | 0 | 0 | 0 | 0 | 0 | 0 |
| 43 | DF | (United States) Chuy Moreno | 1 | 0 | 0 | 0 | 0 | 0 | 1 | 0 | 0 |
| 44 | MF | (United States) Jackson Stephens | 0 | 0 | 0 | 0 | 0 | 0 | 0 | 0 | 0 |
| 45 | FW | (United States) David Santos | 0 | 0 | 0 | 0 | 0 | 0 | 0 | 0 | 0 |
| 77 | MF | (United States) Diego Abarca | 4 | 0 | 0 | 0 | 0 | 0 | 4 | 0 | 0 |
| Total | | | 64 | 2 | 3 | 0 | 0 | 0 | 64 | 2 | 3 |

- Last updated: September 26, 2025
- Source: https://www.mlsnextpro.com/stats/players/#season=2025&competition=mls-next-pro&club=20220&statType=general&position=all

== Awards and honors ==
=== MLSNP Player of the Week ===
| Week | Player | Opponent | Ref |
|---|---|---|---|
| 1 | (Liberia) Jimmy Farkarlun | Colorado Rapids 2 | |
