= 2026 Austin FC II season =

Austin FC II
2026 season
- Chairman: Anthony Precourt
- Head coach: Jason Shackell
- Stadium: Parmer Field
- MLSNP: Frontier Division:1st; Western Conference:1st; MLSNP:1st
- Top goalscorer: League: (Spain) Jorge Alastuey (9 goals); All: (Spain) Jorge Alastuey (9 goals)
- Biggest win: ATX 3–0 TAC (5/10); ATX 4–1 STL (5/17); SKC 0–3 ATX (5/22)
- Biggest defeat: ATX 2 – 4 MNU (3/1)
Home colors	Away colors
- All statistics correct as of {{subst:mdtyime}}.

The 2026 Austin FC II season is the club's fourth season in MLS Next Pro, the third tier of soccer in the United States. They play in the league's Western Conference. Austin FC II finished in 9th place in the Western Conference and 15th overall in the 2025 MLS Next Pro season, failing to qualify for the playoffs.

== Background ==
Austin FC started playing in the MLS Western Conference in 2021. In August 2022 it was announced that they would launch a MLS Next Pro team for the 2023 season. Austin FC II first season was the 2023 season, where they finished the season 2nd in the Western Conference and went on to win the 2023 MLS Next Pro Cup.

== Season ==
=== Preseason ===
On November 21, 2025, Austin FC II announced they had named Jason Shackell the new head coach. Shackell has been a member of the academy coaching staff since 2021. On January 15, 2026, Austin FC II announced their first new signing for the season, bringing on Senegalese forward Ibrahima Sall through the 2027 season with a one-year option. Sall joined Austin from Serie D club SSD San Nicolò Notaresco. On the same day, Austin also announced the signing of goalkeeper Erik Lauta as a free agent through the 2027 season. Lauta spent his first professional season with Huntsville City FC. On January 27, Austin announced they had loaned Antonio Gomez to USL Championship side Sporting Club Jacksonville for the duration of the 2026 season. On February 3, Austin announced two more roster moves as they prepare for 2026 season. Austin traded Bonachera to Sant Andreu and signed Evan Watt through the 2027 season. On February 6, Austin FC II announced they had signed both 2026 MLS SuperDraft pick, forward Stefan Dobrijevic and midfielder Patrick Cayelli. Both players are on two year contracts taking them through the 2027 season, with options for 2028. On February 12, Austin FC II announced the signing of defender Neo Che. Che is signed to a three-year contract, through the 2028 season. Austin FC II signed Kosovar defender Dren Dobruna on February 20, bringing the left back on with a guarantee through the 2027 season and club option for 2028. Prior to the first game, Austin announced updates for the 2026 roster. First team defender Riley Thomas, goalkeeper Damian Las, forward CJ Fodrey, midfielder Micah Burton, and midfielder Ervin Torres signed loans for the 2026 season. In addition academy players Defender Chuy Moreno, goalkeeper Cooper Roney, goalkeeper Liam Flynn, defender Vona Dievbiere, midfielder Landry Moncrief, defender Ryan Klinger, winger Aiden Hale, and defender Sebastian Seiterle signed amateur agreements.

=== Early season ===
Austin played their first match of the season on March 1, falling 2–4 to Minnesota United FC 2. Both of Austin goals were scored by Spanish midfielder Jorge Alastuey. Austin earned their first point of the season in a 2–2 draw versus Ventura County FC, but failed to secure the second point falling 2–3 in the shootout. Goals for Austin were scored by Riley in the 19th minute and Sall in the 43rd minute. Austin earned their first win of the season against cross state rivals North Texas SC 1–0 on a goal by Barro. Austin earned their first road win of the season against Tacoma Defiance, with Kenan Hot scoring the only goal of the match and his first of the season. In the next home match, Austin saved it until th 90+6 minute to grab a point from Houston Dynamo 2, but dropped a point in the shootout 3–4. Austin next travelled to Ventura County FC, earning a 1–1 draw on a goal by Diego Abarca and earned another point on a 3–1 shootout after two Erik Lauta saves.

=== Mid-season ===
After a bye week, Austin travelled to North Texas, securing a 2–0 victory on goals from Alastuey and Burton. Austin FC II extended their undeafeated streak to eight games with a 2–0 road win against Colorado Rapids 2. Both Lisboa Felciano and Badawiya scored their first professional goals after coming on as subs in the second half. Austin extended their unbeaten streak to nine with four wins in a row after they defeated St. Louis City 2 4–1 on goals from Lisboa Feliciano, Alastuey, Hot, and Dobrijevic. Austin earned their fifth consecutive win and extended their undefeated streak to 10 with a 3–0 win over Sporting Kansas City II, moving into 2nd place in the Western Conference.

== Management team ==
Position	Name
Chairman	(United States) Anthony Precourt
Chief Soccer Officer and Sporting Director	Khaled El-Ahmad
Head coach	(England) Jason Shackell
Head coach	(Palestine) Omar Jarun
Goalkeeping coach	(United States) Peter Davis

== Roster ==
As of August 26, 2026.

No.	Name	Nationality	Position(s)	Date of birth (age)	Signed in	Previous club	Apps	Goals
Goalkeepers
1	Charlie Farrar	(England)	Goalkeeper	August 8, 2003 (age 23)	2025	(United States) UNC Asheville	4	0
12	Damian Las	(United States)	Goalkeeper	April 11, 2002 (age 24)	2026	(United States) Austin FC	0	0
13	Erik Lauta	(United States)	Goalkeeper	July 6, 2003 (age 23)	2026	(United States) Huntsville City FC	14	0
40	Liam Flynn	(United States)	Goalkeeper		2026	(United States) Austin FC Academy	0	0
41	Cooper Roney	(United States)	Goalkeeper		2026	(United States) Austin FC Academy	0	0
Defenders
2	Riley Thomas	(United States)	DF	March 15, 2002 (age 24)	2025	(United States) North Carolina	9	1
3	Dren Dobruna	(Kosovo)	DF	July 29, 2005 (age 21)	2026	(United States) Dayton	9	0
4	Evan Watt	(United States)	DF	August 8, 2003 (age 23)	2026	(England) Weymouth F.C.	18	1
5	Jules Berv	(France)	DF	January 4, 2004 (age 22)	2025	(France) Monaco U–21	17	0
14	Daniel Cieśla	(Poland)	DF	January 7, 2005 (age 21)	2025	(Poland) Nieciecza	13	1
15	Artem Dashkovets	(Ukraine)	DF	January 12, 2005 (age 21)	2026	(Ukraine) Veres Rivne U–19	4	0
23	Neo Che	(United States)	DF	January 7, 2007 (age 19)	2026	(Germany) Ingolstadt Academy	2	0
37	Erick Lisboa Feliciano	(United States)	DF		2026	(United States) Austin FC Academy	12	3
42	Chuy Moreno	(United States)	DF		2026	(United States) Austin FC Academy	0	0
45	Ryan Klinger	(United States)	DF		2026	(United States) Austin FC Academy	0	0
46	Vona Dievbiere	(United States)	DF		2026	(United States) Austin FC Academy	0	0
47	Sebastian Seiterie	(United States)	DF		2026	(United States) Austin FC Academy	0	0
Midfielders
6	Djakaria Barro	(Ivory Coast)	MF	January 12, 2002 (age 24)	2025	(Spain) RCD Mallorca B	16	1
7	Diego Abarca	(United States)	MF	June 19, 2005 (age 21)	2024	(United States) El Paso Locomotive FC	14	5
8	Adrián González	(Mexico)	MF	June 23, 2003 (age 23)	2025	(United States) Columbus Crew 2	11	0
10	Jorge Alastuey	(Spain)	MF	May 14, 2003 (age 23)	2025	(Poland) ŁKS Łódź	14	9
16	Marcel Ruszel	(United States)	MF	June 21, 2004 (age 22)	2025	(Poland) Stal Stalowa Wola	12	1
18	Patrick Cayelli	(United States)	MF	January 7, 2004 (age 22)	2026	(United States) Pennsylvania	16	1
20	Mo Badawiya	(United States)	MF	November 14, 2007 (age 18)	2025	(United States) Austin FC Academy	15	1
24	Kenan Hot	(United States)	MF	March 16, 2004 (age 22)	2026	(United States) Duke	13	2
32	Micah Burton	(United States)	MF	March 26, 2006 (age 20)	2023	(United States) Austin FC	12	3
38	Ervin Torres	(United States)	MF	November 14, 2007 (age 18)	2023	(United States) Austin FC Academy	6	2
43	Landry Moncrief	(United States)	MF		2026	(United States) Austin FC Academy	1	0
48	Christian Ayala	(United States)	MF	July 5, 2009 (age 17)	2026	(United States) Austin FC Academy	2	1
Forward
9	Vlad Dǎnciuțiu	(Romania)	FW	July 11, 2006 (age 20)	2025	(Italy) Udinese U-20	14	3
11	Patrick Gryczewski	(United States)	FW	March 25, 2003 (age 23)	2025	(United States) Rhode Islands	2	0
21	Stefan Dobrijevic	(United States)	FW	October 18, 2003 (age 23)	2026	(United States) Akron	13	3
22	Ibrahima Sall	(Senegal)	FW	May 21, 2005 (age 21)	2026	(Italy) Notaresco	15	3
44	Aiden Hale	(United States)	FW		2026	(United States) Austin FC Academy	2	0
	CJ Fodrey	(United States)	FW	February 10, 2004 (age 22)	2023	(United States) Austin FC	0	0

== Transfers ==
=== In ===
Date	Position	No.	Name	From	Fee	Ref.
January 15, 2026	FW	22	(Senegal) Ibrahima Sall	(Italy) Notaresco	Free	
January 15, 2026	GK	13	(United States) Erik Lauta	(United States) Huntsville City FC	Free	
February 3, 2026	DF	4	(United States) Evan Watt	(England) Weymouth F.C.	Free	
February 6, 2026	FW	21	(United States) Stefan Dobrijevic	(United States) Akron	Drafted	
February 6, 2026	MF	18	(United States) Patrick Cayelli	(United States) Pennsylvania	Drafted	
February 12, 2026	DF	23	(United States) Neo Che	(Germany) Ingolstadt Academy	Free	
February 20, 2026	DF	3	(Kosovo) Dren Dobruna	(United States) Dayton	Free	
March 6, 2026	MF	24	(United States) Kenan Hot	(United States) Duke	Free	
March 31, 2026	DF	15	(Ukraine) Artem Dashkovets	(Ukraine) Veres Rivne U–19	Free	

=== Loan In ===
No.	Pos.	Player	Loaned from	Start	End	Source
2	MF	(United States) Riley Thomas	(United States) Austin FC	February 27, 2026	December 31, 2026	
12	MF	(United States) Damian Las	(United States) Austin FC	February 27, 2026	December 31, 2026	
19	MF	(United States) CJ Fodrey	(United States) Austin FC	February 27, 2026	August 26, 2026	
32	MF	(United States) Micah Burton	(United States) Austin FC	February 27, 2026	December 31, 2026	
38	MF	(United States) Ervin Torres	(United States) Austin FC	February 27, 2026	December 31, 2026	
10	MF	(Spain) Jorge Alastuey	(United States) Austin FC	July 30, 2026	December 31, 2026	

=== Amateur agreements ===
No.	Pos.	Player	Loaned from	Start	End	Source
40	GK	(United States) Liam Flynn	(United States) Austin FC Academy	February 27, 2026	December 31, 2026	
41	GK	(United States) Cooper Roney	(United States) Austin FC Academy	February 27, 2026	December 31, 2026	
42	DF	(United States) Chuy Moreno	(United States) Austin FC Academy	February 27, 2026	December 31, 2026	
43	MF	(United States) Landry Moncrief	(United States) Austin FC Academy	February 27, 2026	December 31, 2026	
44	FW	(United States) Aiden Hale	(United States) Austin FC Academy	February 27, 2026	December 31, 2026	
45	DF	(United States) Ryan Klinger	(United States) Austin FC Academy	February 27, 2026	December 31, 2026	
46	DF	(United States) Vona Dievbiere	(United States) Austin FC Academy	February 27, 2026	December 31, 2026	
47	DF	(United States) Sebastian Seiterie	(United States) Austin FC Academy	February 27, 2026	December 31, 2026	
48	MF	(United States) Christian Ayala	(United States) Austin FC Academy		December 31, 2026	

=== Out ===
Date	Position	No.	Name	To	Type	Fee	Ref.
January 21, 2026	FW	9	(Republic of Ireland) Peter Grogan	(Republic of Ireland) Athlone Town	Mutual Agreement		
February 3, 2026	DF	3	(Spain) Rubén Bonachera	(Spain) UE Sant Andreu	Trade		
March 17, 2026	DF	17	(Turkey) Batuhan Arıcı		Mutual agreement		
July 31, 2026	MF	10	(Spain) Jorge Alastuey	(United States) Austin FC	Signed with 1st Team	Free	

=== Loan out ===
No.	Pos.	Player	Loaned to	Start	End	Source
4	DF	(United States) Antonio Gomez	(United States) Sporting Club Jacksonville	January 27, 2026	December 31, 2026	

== Non-competitive fixtures ==
=== Preseason ===
Win	SOW	SOL	Loss

Date	Opponent	Venue	Location	Result (Note: Austin FC II's score written first)	Scorers
January 31	Houston Christian	Parmer Field	Austin, Texas		
February 7	Houston Dynamo 2	SaberCats Stadium	Houston, Texas		
February 11	Incarnate Word	Parmer Field	Austin, Texas		
February 15	St. Louis City 2	Parmer Field	Austin, Texas		
February 22	Corpus Christi FC	Parmer Field	Austin, Texas		

== Competitive fixtures ==
=== Major League Soccer Regular Season ===
==== Standings ====
===== Western Conference =====
Pos	Div	Team	Pld	W	SOW	SOL	L	GF	GA	GD	Pts	Qualification
1	FR	Austin FC II	28	19	2	4	3	54	21	+33	65	Round one
2	PC	Portland Timbers 2	28	14	5	5	4	37	29	+8	57	Round one
3	PC	Ventura County FC	28	14	4	3	7	58	36	+22	53	Round one
4	FR	Houston Dynamo 2	28	14	4	2	8	52	32	+20	52	Round one
5	FR	Minnesota United FC 2	28	12	3	3	10	43	39	+4	45	Round one

Source: MLSNP
Rules for classification: 1) Points; 2) Total regulation wins; 3) Total goal differential; 4) Total goals scored; 5) Total shootout wins; 6) Away goal differential; 7) Away goals scored; 8) Home goals differential; 9) Home goals scored; 10) Fewer disciplinary points; 11) Drawing of lots.

===== Overall =====
Pos	Div	Team	Pld	W	SOW	SOL	L	GF	GA	GD	Pts	Awards
1	FR	Austin FC II (C)	28	19	2	4	3	54	21	+33	65	Regular season champion
2	SE	Crown Legacy FC	28	15	5	3	5	67	39	+28	58	
3	PC	Portland Timbers 2	28	14	5	5	4	37	29	+8	57	
4	SE	Chattanooga FC	28	15	4	3	6	56	39	+17	56	
5	PC	Ventura County FC	28	14	4	3	7	58	36	+22	53	

Source: MLSNP
Rules for classification: 1) Points; 2) Total regulation wins; 3) Total goal differential; 4) Total goals scored; 5) Total shootout wins; 6) Away goal differential; 7) Away goals scored; 8) Home goals differential; 9) Home goals scored; 10) Fewer disciplinary points; 11) Drawing of lots.
(C) Champion

==== Matches ====
Win	SOW	SOL	Loss

Matchday	Date	Opponent	Venue	Location	Result (Note: Austin FC II's score written first)	Scorers	Position
1	March 1	Minnesota United FC 2	Parmer Field	Austin, Texas	2-4	Alastuey 73', 87'	11th Western Conf.
2	March 8	Ventura County FC	Parmer Field	Austin, Texas	2–2; 2-3 (p)	Riley 19', Sall 43'	10th Western Conf.
3	March 15	North Texas SC	Parmer Field	Austin, Texas	1–0	Barro 38'	8th Western Conf.
4	March 22	Tacoma Defiance	Starfire Sports	Tukwila, Washington	1–0	Hot 88'	5th Western Conf.
5	April 12	Houston Dynamo 2	Parmer Field	Austin, Texas	1–1; 3–4 (p)	Alastuey 90+6'	6th Western Conf.
6	April 18	Ventura County FC	William Rolland Stadium	Thousand Oaks, California	1–1; 3–1 (p)	Abarca 60'	7th Western Conf.
7	May 2	North Texas SC	Choctaw Stadium	Arlington, Texas	2–0	Alastuey 9', Burton 45+1	6th Western Conf
8	May 10	Tacoma Defiance	Parmer Field	Austin, Texas	3–0	Dănciuțiu 54', Alastuey 58' (p), Cieśla 73'	5th Western Conf
9	May 13	Colorado Rapids 2	Dick's Sporting Goods Park	Commerce City, Colorado	2–0	Feliciano 54', Badawiya 66'	3rd Western Conf
10	May 17	St. Louis City 2	Parmer Field	Austin, Texas	4–1	Feliciano 5', Alastuey 19', Hot 73', Dobrijevic 79'	3rd Western Conf
11	May 22	Sporting Kansas City II	Swope Soccer Village	Kansas City, Missouri	3–0	Abarca 14', Sall 22', Ruszel 66'	2nd Western Conf
12	June 7	Los Angeles FC 2	Parmer Field	Austin, Texas	2–0	Torres 63', Sall 65'	3rd Western Conf
13	June 14	Minnesota United FC 2	National Sports Center	Blaine, Minnesota	3–1	Torres 3', Burton 6', Feliciano 35'	2nd Western Conf
14	June 21	Sporting Kansas City II	Parmer Field	Austin, Texas	2–1	Abarca 22', 45+1' (p)	1st Western Conf
15	June 28	St. Louis City 2	Energizer Park	St. Louis, Missouri	2–0	Alastuey 34', Dănciuțiu 69'	1st Western Conf
16	July 5	Colorado Rapids 2	Parmer Field	Austin, Texas	3–2	Dănciuțiu 4', Dobrijevic 67', 70'	1st Western Conf
17	July 12	Minnesota United FC 2	Parmer Field	Austin, Texas	2–3	Alastuey 34', 45+1'	1st Western Conf
18	July 22	Whitecaps FC 2	Swangard Stadium	Burnaby, Canada	4–0	Burton 8', Abarca 31', Watt 45+2', Ayala 90+1'	1st Western Conf
19	July 26	Houston Dynamo 2	SaberCats Stadium	Houston, Texas	1–1; 4-5 (p)	Ayala 86'	1st Western Conf
20	August 2	San Jose Earthquakes II	CEFCU Stadium	San Jose, California	1–1; 4-3 (p)	Dobrijevic 32'	1st Western Conf
21	August 9	Sporting Kansas City II	Parmer Field	Austin, Texas	1–0	Sall 89'	1st Western Conf
22	August 16	Whitecaps FC 2	Parmer Field	Austin, Texas	4–1	Dobrijevic 23', 54', Abarca 45+1', Barro 64'	1st Western Conf
23	August 19	North Texas SC	Choctaw Stadium	Arlington, Texas	0–0; 4-5 (p)		1st Western Conf
24	August 23	San Jose Earthquakes II	Parmer Field	Austin, Texas	1–0	Abarca 73'	1st Western Conf
25	August 30	Portland Timbers 2	Providence Park	Portland, Oregon	1–2	Dobrijevic 14'	1st Western Conf
26	September 4	Houston Dynamo 2	SaberCats Stadium	Houston, Texas	2–0	Feliciano 2', Gryczewski 75	1st Western Conf
27	September 13	Colorado Rapids 2	Parmer Field	Austin, Texas	1–0	Gryczewski 90+2'	1st Western Conf
28	September 20	St. Louis City 2	Energizer Park	St. Louis, Missouri	2–0	Sall 17', Abarca 63'	1st Western Conf

=== Playoffs ===
Win	SOW	SOL	Loss

Round	Date	Opponent	Venue	Location	Result	Scorers	Attendance
Conference Quarterfinals	October 18	San Jose Earthquakes II	Parmer Field	Austin, Texas	2–1	Sall 58', Gryczewski 88'	
Conference Semifinals	October 25	Los Angeles FC 2	Parmer Field	Austin, Texas	0–1		

== Statistics ==
=== Appearances and goals ===
Numbers after plus–sign (+) denote appearances as a substitute.

No.	Pos	Nat	Player	Total		MLSNP		MLSNP Playoffs	
No.	Pos	Nat	Player	Apps	Goals	Apps	Goals	Apps	Goals
1	GK	(England) ENG	Charlie Farrar	8	0	8+0	0	0+0	0
2	DF	(United States) USA	Riley Thomas	14	1	12+0	1	2+0	0
3	DF	(Kosovo) KOS	Dren Dobruna	17	0	8+8	0	1+0	0
4	DF	(United States) USA	Evan Watt	29	1	25+2	1	2+0	0
5	DF	(France) FRA	Jules Bery	29	0	27+0	0	2+0	0
6	MF	(Ivory Coast) CIV	Djakaria Barro	23	2	22+1	2	0+0	0
7	MF	(United States) USA	Diego Abarca	25	8	14+9	8	2+0	0
8	MF	(Mexico) MEX	Adrián González	21	0	13+6	0	2+0	0
9	FW	(Romania) ROU	Vlad Dǎnciuțiu	17	3	4+13	3	0+0	0
10	MF	(Spain) ESP	Jorge Alastuey	15	9	14+1	9	0+0	0
11	FW	(United States) USA	Patrick Gryczewski	10	3	2+6	2	0+2	1
12	GK	(United States) USA	Damian Las	0	0	0+0	0	0+0	0
13	GK	(United States) USA	Erik Lauta	22	0	20+0	0	2+0	0
14	DF	(Poland) POL	Daniel Cieśla	21	1	15+5	1	0+1	0
15	DF	(Ukraine) UKR	Artem Dashkovets	4	0	2+2	0	0+0	0
16	MF	(United States) USA	Marcel Ruszel	21	1	11+10	1	0+0	0
17	DF	(Turkey) TUR	Batuhan Arıcı	0	0	0+0	0	0+0	0
18	MF	(United States) USA	Patrick Cayelli	30	0	22+6	0	1+1	0
20	MF	(United States) USA	Mo Badawiya	16	1	3+13	1	0+0	0
21	FW	(United States) USA	Stefan Dobrijevic	25	7	13+10	7	0+2	0
22	FW	(Senegal) SEN	Ibrahima Sall	28	6	16+10	5	2+0	1
23	DF	(United States) USA	Neo Che	2	0	0+2	0	0+0	0
24	MF	(United States) USA	Kenan Hot	22	2	12+8	2	1+1	0
32	MF	(United States) USA	Micah Burton	15	3	12+2	3	0+1	0
37	MF	(United States) USA	Erick Lisboa Feliciano	24	4	16+6	4	2+0	0
38	MF	(United States) USA	Ervin Torres	6	2	5+1	2	0+0	0
40	GK	(United States) USA	Liam Flynn	0	0	0+0	0	0+0	0
41	GK	(United States) USA	Cooper Roney	0	0	0+0	0	0+0	0
41	MF	(United States) USA	Luke Chamberlain	7	0	1+4	0	1+1	0
42	DF	(United States) USA	Chuy Moreno	0	0	0+0	0	0+0	0
42	MF	(United States) USA	Jacob Peale	1	0	0+1	0	0+0	0
43	MF	(United States) USA	Landry Moncrief	1	0	0+1	0	0+0	0
43	MF	(United States) USA	Nathan Anaya	2	0	0+2	0	0+0	0
44	FW	(United States) USA	Aiden Hale	0	0	0+0	0	0+0	0
45	DF	(United States) USA	Ryan Klinger	1	0	0+1	0	0+0	0
46	DF	(United States) USA	Vona Dievbiere	0	0	0+0	0	0+0	0
47	DF	(United States) USA	Sebastian Seiterie	0	0	0+0	0	0+0	0
48	MF	(United States) USA	Christian Ayala	14	2	6+6	2	2+0	0
	FW	(United States) USA	CJ Fodrey	1	0	1+0	0	0+0	0

- Last updated: October 25, 2026
- Source: MLSNP

=== Top scorers ===
Rank	Position	Number	Name	MLSNP	MLSNP Playoffs	Total
1	MF	10	(Spain) Jorge Alastuey	9	0	9
2	MF	7	(United States) Diego Abarca	8	0	8
3	FW	21	(United States) Stefan Dobrijevic	7	0	7
4	FW	22	(Ghana) Ibrahima Sall	5	1	6
5	DF	37	(United States) Erick Lisboa Feliciano	4	0	4
6	FW	9	(Romania) Vlad Dănciuțiu	3	0	3
6	MF	32	(United States) Micah Burton	3	0	3
6	FW	11	(United States) Patrick Gryczewski	2	1	3
9	MF	6	(Ivory Coast) Djakaria Barro	2	0	2
9	MF	24	(United States) Kenan Hot	2	0	2
9	MF	38	(United States) Ervin Torres	2	0	2
9	MF	48	(United States) Christian Ayala	2	0	2
12
12	DF	2	(United States) Riley Thomas	1	0	1
12	DF	4	(United States) Evan Watt	1	0	1
12	DF	14	(Poland) Daniel Cieśla	1	0	1
12	MF	16	(United States) Marcel Ruszel	1	0	1
12	MF	20	(United States) Mo Badawiya	1	0	1
Total				54	2	56

- Last updated: October 18, 2026
- Source: MLSNP

=== Top assists ===
Rank	Position	Number	Name	MLSNP	MLSNP Playoffs	Total
1	MF	18	(United States) Patrick Cayelli	6	0	6
2	DF	5	(France) Jules Bery	4	0	4
2	MF	20	(United States) Mo Badawiya	4	0	4
4	DF	37	(United States) Erick Lisboa Feliciano	3	0	3
5	DF	2	(United States) Riley Thomas	2	0	2
5	MF	3	(Kosovo) Dren Dobruna	2	0	2
5	MF	10	(Spain) Jorge Alastuey	2	0	2
5	DF	14	(Poland) Daniel Cieśla	2	0	2
5	FW	21	(United States) Stefan Dobrijevic	2	0	2
5	FW	22	(Ghana) Ibrahima Sall	2	0	2
5	MF	24	(United States) Kenan Hot	2	0	2
5	MF	32	(United States) Micah Burton	2	0	2
13	MF	6	(Ivory Coast) Djakaria Barro	1	0	1
13	MF	7	(United States) Diego Abarca	1	0	1
13	MF	8	(Mexico) Adrián González	1	0	1
13	MF	16	(United States) Marcel Ruszel	1	0	1
13	MF	38	(United States) Ervin Torres	1	0	1
13	MF	48	(United States) Christian Ayala	1	0	1
Total				39	0	39

- Last updated: September 20, 2026
- Source: MLSNP

=== Clean sheets ===
Rank	Number	Name	MLSNP	MLSNP Playoffs	Total
1	1	(England) Charlie Farrar	7	0	7
1	13	(United States) Erik Lauta	7	0	7
Total			14	0	14

- Last updated: September 13, 2026
- Source: MLSNP

=== Disciplinary record ===
No.	Pos.	Player	MLSNP			MLSNP Playoffs			Total		
No.	Pos.	Player	Yellow card	(yellow card) (yellow-red card)	Red card	Yellow card	(yellow card) (yellow-red card)	Red card	Yellow card	(yellow card) (yellow-red card)	Red card
1	GK	(England) Charlie Farrar	0	0	0	0	0	0	0	0	0
2	DF	(United States) Riley Thomas	6	0	0	0	0	0	6	0	0
3	DF	(Kosovo) Dren Dobruna	3	0	0	0	0	0	3	0	0
4	DF	(United States) Evan Watt	2	0	0	0	0	0	2	0	0
5	DF	(France) Jules Bery	4	0	0	1	0	0	5	0	0
6	MF	(Ivory Coast) Djakaria Barro	7	0	0	0	0	0	7	0	0
7	MF	(United States) Diego Abarca	3	0	1	0	0	0	3	0	1
8	MF	(Mexico) Adrián González	2	0	1	1	0	0	3	0	1
9	FW	(Romania) Vlad Dǎnciuțiu	2	0	0	0	0	0	2	0	0
10	MF	(Spain) Jorge Alastuey	3	0	0	0	0	0	3	0	0
11	FW	(United States) Patrick Gryczewski	0	0	0	0	0	0	0	0	0
12	GK	(United States) Damian Las	0	0	0	0	0	0	0	0	0
13	GK	(United States) Erik Lauta	2	0	0	0	0	0	2	0	0
14	DF	(Poland) Daniel Cieśla	5	0	0	0	0	0	5	0	0
15	DF	(Ukraine) Artem Dashkovets	0	0	0	0	0	0	0	0	0
16	MF	(United States) Marcel Ruszel	7	0	0	0	0	0	7	0	0
17	MF	(Turkey) Batuhan Arıcı	0	0	0	0	0	0	0	0	0
18	MF	(United States) Patrick Cayelli	4	0	0	0	0	0	4	0	0
20	MF	(United States) Mo Badawiya	0	0	0	0	0	0	0	0	0
21	FW	(United States) Stefan Dobrijevic	3	0	0	0	0	0	3	0	0
22	FW	(Ghana) Ibrahima Sall	2	0	0	0	0	0	2	0	0
23	DF	(United States) Neo Che	0	0	0	0	0	0	0	0	0
24	MF	(United States) Kenan Hot	3	0	0	1	0	0	4	0	0
32	MF	(United States) Micah Burton	3	0	0	0	0	0	3	0	0
37	DF	(United States) Erick Lisboa Feliciano	5	0	0	0	0	0	5	0	0
38	MF	(United States) Ervin Torres	0	0	0	0	0	0	0	0	0
40	GK	(United States) Liam Flynn	0	0	0	0	0	0	0	0	0
41	GK	(United States) Cooper Roney	0	0	0	0	0	0	0	0	0
41	MF	(United States) Luke Chamberlain	0	0	0	1	0	0	1	0	0
42	DF	(United States) Chuy Moreno	0	0	0	0	0	0	0	0	0
43	MF	(United States) Landry Moncrief	0	0	0	0	0	0	0	0	0
44	FW	(United States) Aiden Hale	0	0	0	0	0	0	0	0	0
45	DF	(United States) Ryan Klinger	0	0	0	0	0	0	0	0	0
46	DF	(United States) Vona Dievbiere	0	0	0	0	0	0	0	0	0
47	DF	(United States) Sebastian Seiterie	0	0	0	0	0	0	0	0	0
48	MF	(United States) Christian Ayala	3	0	0	0	0	0	3	0	0
	FW	(United States) CJ Fodrey	0	0	0	0	0	0	0	0	0
Total			69	0	2	4	0	0	72	0	2

- Last updated: October 25, 2026
- Source: MLSNP

== Awards and honors ==
=== Weekly Awards ===
==== MLSNP Team of the MatchWeek ====
MatchWeek	Ref
11	

==== MLSNP Rising Star of the MatchWeek ====
MatchWeek	Player	Ref
11	(United States) Erick Lisboa Feliciano	
27	(United States) Erick Lisboa Feliciano	

==== MLSNP Goal of the MatchWeek ====
MatchWeek	Player	Opponent	Ref
16	(United States) Diego Abarca	Sporting Kansas City II	
21	(United States) Diego Abarca	Whitecaps FC 2	

=== Monthly Awards ===
==== MLSNP Team of the Month ====
Month	Ref
May	
June	
September	

==== MLSNP Goalkeeper of the Month ====
Month	Player	Ref
May	(United States) Erik Lauta	
June	(United States) Erik Lauta	
September	(England) Charlie Farrar	

==== MLSNP Rising Star of the Month ====
Month	Player	Ref
May	(United States) Erick Lisboa Feliciano	

==== MLSNP Coach of the Month ====
Month	Player	Ref
June	(England) Jason Shackell	

=== Yearly Awards ===
==== MLS Next Pro Defender of the Year ====
Player	Ref
(France) Jules Bery	

==== MLS Next Pro Best XI ====
Player	Position	Ref
(France) Jules Bery	Defender	
(Spain) Jorge Alastuey	Midfielder	

==== MLS Next Pro Coach of the Year ====
Coach	Ref
(England) Jason Shackell	
