= Diego Abarca =

American soccer player (born 2005)

Personal information
- Date of birth: June 19, 2005 (age 21)
- Place of birth: El Paso, Texas, U.S.
- Position: Midfielder

Team information
- Current team: Austin FC II
- Number: 77

Youth career
- 2020–2022: El Paso Locomotive

Senior career*
Years	Team	Apps	(Gls)
2021–2024	El Paso Locomotive	16	(1)
2024–	Austin FC II	63	(9)
- * Club domestic league appearances and goals as of 23:33, September 21, 2026 (UTC)

Diego Abarca (born June 19, 2005) is an American professional soccer player who plays for Austin FC II in MLS Next Pro.

== Career ==
=== El Paso Locomotive ===
As part of the El Paso youth academy, Abarca signed a USL Academy contract allowing him to play in professional games in 2021. He made his professional debut on March 24, 2022, against Las Vegas Lights. He started and played 58 minutes.

He scored his first professional goal against Hartford Athletic on June 5, 2022, three minutes after coming on as a substitute for fellow Academy member Venancio Calderon. This goal later won Locomotive Goal of the Year. He also became the youngest player to score a goal for Locomotive. On October 28, 2022, Abarca signed a fully professional contract with El Paso ahead of the 2023 season.

=== Austin FC II ===
On 20 June 2024, Abarca was signed by Austin FC II through the 2024 season with two two-year options.

== Personal life ==
Born in the United States to Chilean parents, his father, José, was a footballer for Unión Española and his mother, Sandra Ramírez, is the cousin of the former Chile international footballer, Jorge Acuña.

== Career statistics ==
=== Club ===
As of matches played October 25, 2026

Appearances and goals by club, season and competition
Club	Season	League			League Cup		National Cup (Note: Includes appearances in U.S. Open Cup)		Continental		Total	
Club	Season	Division	Apps	Goals	Apps	Goals	Apps	Goals	Apps	Goals	Apps	Goals
El Paso Locomotive FC	2022	USL Championship	8	1	–		0	0	–		8	1
El Paso Locomotive FC	2023	USL Championship	5	0	0	0	1	0	–		6	0
El Paso Locomotive FC	2024	USL Championship	3	0	–		0	0	–		3	0
El Paso Locomotive FC	Total		16	1	–		1	0	0	0	17	1
Austin FC II	2024	MLS Next Pro	15	2	–		0	0	–		15	2
Austin FC II	2025	MLS Next Pro	26	1	–		–		–		26	1
Austin FC II	2026	MLS Next Pro	21	6	2 (Note: Includes appearance(s) in MLS Next Pro Playoffs)	0	–		–		23	6
Austin FC II	Total		62	9	2	0	0	0	0	0	64	9
Career total			75	10	2	0	1	0	0	0	78	10

== Honors ==
Austin FC II

- MLS Next Pro: Regular Season Champion – 2026
