= 2024 Austin FC season =

Austin FC
2024 season
- Chairman: Anthony Precourt
- Head coach: Vacant
- Stadium: Q2 Stadium
- MLS: 10th Western Conference; 18th MLS
- MLS Cup playoffs: Did not qualify
- Leagues Cup: Round of 32
- Top goalscorer: League: Sebastián Driussi; Jáder Obrian (7 each); All: Sebastián Driussi; Jáder Obrian (8 each)
- Highest home attendance: 20,738
- Lowest home attendance: 20,738
- Average home league attendance: 20,738
- Biggest win: 3 matches at 2–0 (MLS); ATX 2–0 Monterrey (7/30) (LC)
- Biggest defeat: RSL 5–1 ATX (6/1) (MLS)
Home colors	Away colors	Third colors
- All statistics correct as of 20:39, November 5, 2024 (UTC).

The 2024 Austin FC season was the club's fourth season in Major League Soccer, the topflight of soccer in the United States. Austin FC competed in the league's Western Conference.

== Background ==
Austin FC started playing in the MLS Western Conference in 2021, finishing in 12th place with a record of 9W-4D-21L. 2022 brought many new experiences to Austin FC. They lost their first ever U.S. Open Cup match against San Antonio FC in extra time, won their first trophy, the Copa Tejas, and qualified for their first-ever MLS Cup Playoffs in just their second season as a franchise. Austin FC advanced to the Western Conference Finals but lost to LAFC. Austin FC fell almost all the way to the bottom of the 2023 standings, with the team finishing in 27th place in Major League Soccer. The new sporting director Rodolfo Borrell was quoted as saying "The team overachieved last year, the team underachieved this year", but showed his support for coach Josh Wolff as the team looks to rebuild for the 2024 season.

== Summary ==
=== Pre-season ===
Austin FC ended the 2023 season with multiple players at the end of their contract. The front office made their first move by signing Ethan Finlay to a new one-year contract with an option for a second year at the end of October. In addition to working on their roster Austin FC started making plans for their 2024 pre-season, announcing they would participate in the AEG sponsored Coachella Valley Invitational taking place February 4–17, 2024. In mid-November 2023, Austin FC announced their initial roster changes for the 2024 season. Alexander Ring met his performance metrics and his contract was extended automatically through the 2024 season. Both Daniel Perreira's and Damian Las's options were exercised for 2024. Charlie Asensio, Will Bruin, Sofiane Djeffal, Kipp Keller, Adam Lundqvist, Alfonso Ocampo-Chavez, Rodney Redes, Memo Rodriguez, and Maximiliano Urruti options were all declined. Brandan Craig will return to the Philadelphia Union at the end of his loan.

Austin started the month of December, by announcing they had exercised Hector Jiménez option for the 2024 season. On December 11, 2023, Austin FC traded Nick Lima to the New England Revolution for $300,000 in GAM. On December 14, Austin traded up for the first pick in the 2023 MLS Re-Entry Draft and subsequently picked Jáder Obrian, who had previously played for FC Dallas. On December 19, 2023, Austin FC chose Nate Jones from University of Washington with the 5th overall pick, and subsequently traded him for $250,000 GAM and the 31st pick. Austin FC then picked Jimmy Farkarlun from UT Rio Grande Valley with that pick. Austin FC signed Stefan Cleveland on December 24, 2023, as a free agent, bringing the roster up to four goalkeepers.

On January 9, 2024, Austin FC announced they had traded Jhohan Romaña to the Argentine team San Lorenzo de Almagro for $750,000. The same day the team announced they had signed defender Guilherme Biro as a free agent. Biro spent the previous season with Brazilian team Mirassol. On January 10, Austin FC announced the signing of their second homegrown player, Micah Burton. Burton was signed to Austin FC II for the 2023 MLS Next Pro season and has multiple appearances with the United States men's national under-17 soccer team. The team reported for pre-season on January 13, 2024, and announced that Sebastián Driussi had obtained his green card and no longer would occupy an international spot on the roster. On January 29, 2024, Austin FC announced that they had signed Damian Las to new contract through the 2026 season, with an optional additional year. Austin FC also announced that Las would be loaned to Louisville City FC for the 2024 season.

Austin FC started February off by adding another player to the roster when they announced the signing of Striker Diego Rubio as a free agent to a one-year contract, with an option for a second. On February 14 Austin FC announced that they had signed free agend defender Brendan Hines-Ike. Hines-Ike spent the last two seasons with D.C. United.

=== Slow Start - February / March ===
Austin FC started the 2024 MLS season in a lackluster loss Austin to Minnesota United FC 2–1, with Guilherme Biro salvaging a stoppage time goal. On March 2, Austin struggled offensively, being outshot by the Seattle Sounders 9–0 in the first half, but stood strong defensively, earning a 0–0 draw. Returning to Q2 Stadium for their second home match of the season, Austin FC gave up a 2–1 lead, allowing a stoppage time goal against St. Louis City letting their win slip through their fingers, then did the same thing the next week, earning another 2–2 draw, their third straight, this time against the Philadelphia Union. Sebastian Driussi made his first appearance of the season against the Union. Austin lost the next week to Orlando City 2–0. For the next game March 30, Austin ended the first stretch of the season on a high note, defeating in-state rival FC Dallas 2-1 for their first win of the season, with Diego Rubio netting the match-winner in the 70th minute.

=== Springtime Surge - April / May ===
The Verde and Black took advantage of the win against Dallas, and followed it up winning a 4-3 thriller against the San Jose Earthquakes. Trailing 2-0 an hour into the match, Austin got three goals in the next 7 minutes - a penalty from Sebastian Driussi, Jáder Obrian's first goal with Austin, and a goal from Guilherme Biro. San Jose tied it in the 74th minute, but Driussi scored the match-winner 11 minutes into stoppage time on the last kick of the match, the latest goal in Austin FC's short history. Austin wasn't able to keep up the momentum at a road loss in St. Louis where they didn't register a shot on goal, but finally got their first road win of the season, beating the Houston Dynamo 1–0 on an 86th-minute goal by Emiliano Rigoni the next week. It was also their first road goal of the season. On April 26, Austin FC announced they had extended Žan Kolmanič's contract through the 2025 season with an club–option for 2026. El Tree finished April by shutting out LA Galaxy 2–0 at home on two first half goals, one from Diego Rubio, and another from Obrian.

Starting the month of May, Austin FC travelled to Canada to earn one point from the Vancouver Whitecaps FC in a 0–0 draw in the Whitecaps' 50th anniversary match, which set an MLS-era attendance record for them. In their third Copa Tejas match of the season, Austin FC fell behind FC Dallas in the fourth minute, eventually losing with a final score of 2–1. In their next Copa Tejas match of the season four days later, Austin FC scored another late goal against the Houston Dynamo, with Driussi netting the match-winner in the 87th minute. Three days after that, Austin FC took on Sporting Kansas City on May 18, earning a 3–2 victory at home on a brace by Obrian and team leading 5th goal by Driussi. Austin set a new home win streak record of 5 straight home wins. On May 21, Austin FC announced they had exercised their buyout option for Emiliano Rigoni, freeing up a DP, senior roster, and international slot all at once. Austin FC earned a 1–1 draw against San Jose, with center back Brendan Hines-Ike scoring his first goal for the club. Closing out May, Austin FC snapped their home win streak on what Coach Wolff described as a sloopy performance, falling 0–2 to the Portland Timbers. One day later, Austin announced they had signed Ghana-international winger Osman Bukari from Red Star Belgrade for a reported $7.5 million. Bukari will occupy a senior roster, designated player, and international player slot

=== Adding Reinforcements and Leagues Cup - June / July ===
Austin ended the first half of the MLS season with their worst loss, falling 5–1 to Real Salt Lake on Chicho Arango's goal of the year candidate, leading to a hat-trick. Alex Ring added a consolation goal on a PK earned in extra time by Owen Wolff. After a two-week break, Austin FC returned to play against the Colorado Rapids and lost 2–0 on the road. Austin then mustered a draw against Los Angeles FC on a 19th-minute goal by Jáder Obrian, but Kei Kamara scored the equalizer in the 90th minute. It was Kamara's 145th MLS goal, putting him in a tie with Landon Donovan for second all-time. The Verde and Black got back in the win column with a 1–0 win against Minnesota United. Hassani Dotson received two yellow cards in a span of 40 seconds, and Austin capitalized when Diego Rubio scored his fourth goal of the campaign in the 31st minute. Austin FC was held to only two shots oh the road against Sporting KC, dropping all three points in a 2–0 loss. In their first match of July, Austin came from behind on a brace from Gyasi Zardes to earn a win at home against New York City FC. On a flat performance at home, Austin fell 1–0 to Seattle Sounders at home on a 63rd minute goal by, half-time sub, Jordan Morris. Going into their fifth Copa Tejas match of the year, Austin only needed a draw to earn their third straight title. FC Dallas proved to much at home, winning 3–1, after a Sebastián Driussi red card in the 60th minute. In their last match prior to the Leagues Cup, Austin earned a 2–2 draw against Charlotte FC on goals from Alex Ring and Joh Gallagher. Two of Austin's new signings saw their first minutes, with Osman Bukari starting, and Mikkel Desler coming in as a 2nd half sub.

After announcing the Bukari signing on May 30, Austin FC announced the signing of Danish defender Mikkel Desler as a free agent on June 3. Desler, having most recently played Toulouse FC, was signed to a three-and-a-half-year deal taking him through the 2027 season, with a one-year club option. Desler will occupy a senior and international slot on the roster. On June 24, the club announced the signing of CB and Ukrainian national Oleksandr Svatok from SC Dnipro-1. Bukari, Desler, and Svatok are set to join the team July 18 before the Leagues Cup. Ahead of their match versus Sporting KC, Austin FC announced they had signed Jimmy Farkarlun to an MLS contract for the remainder of the 2024 season, with options for the 2025 and 2026 season. On July 1, Austin FC announced they had agreed to mutually part ways with Moussa Djitté.

In their return to the Leagues Cup, Austin out on an impressive display, playing with just 10 men after losing Osman Bukari to a red card in the 34th minute. Austin earned their 3–2 win over Pumas on goals from Alex Ring, Gyasi Zares, and Sebasian Driussi. Four days later, Austin stuns Monterrey in a 2–0 victory in another impressive display, earning their way to the Round of 32. Goals were scored by Jáder Obrian and Dani Pereira. Austin FC travelled to BMO stadium to take on Los Angeles FC in the Round of 32 of the Leagues Cup. Though they put in a quality performance, they fell 2–0, ending their Leagues Cup run.

=== Pushing for the playoffs - August/September ===
In their first MLS match after the summer break, Austin put in a strong performance, winning 2–0 at Geodis Park, bringing Nashville's losing sreak to 7 games. Goals were scored by Jon Gallagher and Osman Bukari's, who scored his first goal for Austin FC. With a thin chance of making the playoffs, Austin's flat performance against Vancouver FC made their chances even worse. Austin fell 1–0, in a home match that was a sub-par display by all players on the pitch. On the road again, Austin FC hoped to push closer to the playoffs, but fell 2–1 to Toronto FC at BMO Field. The lone goal score by Owen Wolff. For their third game on the road, Austin went to California to play Los Angeles FC, earning a 1–1 draw on a team leading goal by Jáder Obrian. Ending all bu the slimmest chances of making the playoffs, Austin fell 1–0 o Houston at home, missing 18 shots. Austin played Real Salt Lake to a first half 0–0 draw before falling behind by two in the 65th minutes. Late game substitutions brought increased intensity, but late goals by Obrian and Biro, earned Austin one point, keeping them mathematically capable of earning a spot in the playoffs. Austin prevented Portland from clinching their playoff slot, with a 1–0 win on a goal by Dani Pereira. The result ensured that Austin is still mathematically capable of earning a playoff spot. Austin went into Dignity Health Sports Park needing a win to stay in contention for the playoffs, but fell 2–1 to the Galaxy, their lone goal coming from Sebastián Driussi early in the second half. The loss officially eliminated Austin from the 2024 playoff race. Austin FC announced on October 6 that head coach Josh Wolff would be released. Austin scored two extra-time goals to earn an end of season 3–2 win against the Colorado Rapids, giving interim-coach Davy Arnaud his first win.

== Management team ==
Position	Name
Chairman	(United States) Anthony Precourt
Sporting Director	Rodolfo Borrell
Head coach (interim)	(United States) Davy Arnaud
Assistant coach	(Chile) Rodrigo Rios
Assistant coach	(United States) Terry Boss
Goalkeeping Coach	(United States) Preston Burpo
Set Piece Coach	(United States) Jason Grubb
Chief Scout	(Spain) Manuel Junco

== Roster ==
As of October 19, 2024.

No.	Name	Nationality	Position(s)	Date of birth (age)	Signed in	Previous club	Apps	Goals
Goalkeepers
1	Brad Stuver	(United States)	GK	April 16, 1991 (age 35)	2020	(United States) New York City FC	36	0
20	Matt Bersano	(United States)	GK	September 10, 1992 (age 34)	2023	(United States) San Jose Earthquakes	0	0
30	Stefan Cleveland	(United States)	GK	May 25, 1994 (age 32)	2024	(United States) Seattle Sounders FC	1	0
Defenders
2	Matt Hedges	(United States)	CB	April 1, 1990 (age 36)	2023	(Canada) Toronto FC	18	1
3	Mikkel Desler	(Denmark)	DF	February 19, 1995 (age 31)	2024	(France) Toulouse FC	9	0
4	Brendan Hines-Ike	(United States)	DF	November 30, 1994 (age 31)	2024	(United States) D.C. United	32	2
15	Leo Väisänen	(Finland)	CB	July 23, 1997 (age 29)	2023	(Sweden) IF Elfsborg	14	0
16	Hector Jiménez	(United States)	RB	November 3, 1988 (age 38)	2020	(United States) Columbus Crew SC	15	0
17	Jon Gallagher	(Republic of Ireland)	LB/RB	February 23, 1996 (age 30)	2020	(United States) Atlanta United FC	34	3
18	Julio Cascante	(Costa Rica)	CB	October 3, 1993 (age 33)	2020	(United States) Portland Timbers	26	2
21	Oleksandr Svatok	(Ukraine)	CB	September 27, 1994 (age 32)	2024	(Ukraine) SC Dnipro-1	6	0
23	Žan Kolmanič (U22) (Note: https://www.mlssoccer.com/news/mls-launches-u22-initiative-to-support-further-investment-in-young-players)	(Slovenia)	LB	March 3, 2000 (age 26)	2021	(Slovenia) Maribor	16	0
29	Guilherme Biro	(Brazil)	LB	May 2, 2000 (age 26)	2024	(Brazil) Mirassol	34	3
39	Antonio Gomez	(United States)	DF		2024	(United States) Austin FC II	0	0
	Salvatore Mazzaferro	(Canada)	DF	October 11, 2001 (age 25)	2024	(United States) Austin FC II	0	0
Midfielders
5	Jhojan Valencia	(Colombia)	MF	July 27, 1996 (age 30)	2022	(Colombia) Deportivo Cali	29	0
6	Daniel Pereira (GA)	(Venezuela)	MF	July 14, 2000 (age 26)	2021	(United States) Virginia Tech Hokies	29	2
7	Osman Bukari (DP)	(Ghana)	MF	December 13, 1998 (age 27)	2024	(Serbia) Red Star Belgrade	11	1
8	Alexander Ring	(Finland)	MF	April 9, 1991 (age 35)	2020	(United States) New York City FC	37	3
10	Sebastián Driussi (DP) (captain)	(Argentina)	MF	February 9, 1996 (age 30)	2021	(Russia) Zenit Saint Petersburg	30	8
13	Ethan Finlay	(United States)	RW	August 6, 1990 (age 36)	2021	(United States) Minnesota United FC	21	1
19	CJ Fodrey (GA)	(United States)	MF	February 10, 2004 (age 22)	2023	(United States) San Diego State	11	0
31	Valentin Noël	(France)	MF	April 27, 1999 (age 27)	2024	(United States) Austin FC II	0	0
32	Micah Burton (HG)	(United States)	MF	March 26, 2006 (age 20)	2024	(United States) Austin FC II	0	0
33	Owen Wolff (HG)	(United States)	MF	December 30, 2004 (age 21)	2020	(United States) Austin FC Academy	34	1
37	Alonso Ramírez	(Mexico)	MF	August 20, 2001 (age 25)	2024	(United States) Austin FC II	2	0
38	Ervin Torres (Note: Called up for Leagues Cup)	(United States)	MF	November 14, 2007 (age 18)	2024	(United States) Austin FC II	1	0
	Emiliano Rigoni	(Argentina)	RW	February 4, 1993 (age 33)	2022	(Brazil) São Paulo FC	11	1
Forward
9	Gyasi Zardes	(United States)	FW	September 2, 1991 (age 35)	2023	(United States) Colorado Rapids	36	4
11	Jáder Obrian	(Colombia)	FW	May 18, 1995 (age 31)	2024	(United States) FC Dallas	36	8
14	Diego Rubio	(Chile)	FW	May 15, 1993 (age 33)	2024	(United States) Colorado Rapids	37	4
26	Jimmy Farkarlun	(Liberia)	FW	July 14, 2001 (age 25)	2024	(United States) Austin FC II	1	0

== Transfers ==
=== In ===
Date	Position	No.	Name	From	Fee	Ref.
December 24, 2023	GK	30	(United States) Stefan Cleveland	(United States) Seattle Sounders FC	Free Agent	
January 9, 2024	DF	29	(Brazil) Guilherme Biro	(Brazil) Mirassol	Free Agent	
January 10, 2024	MF	32	(United States) Micah Burton	(United States) Austin FC II	Free	
February 5, 2024	FW	14	(Chile) Diego Rubio	(United States) Colorado Rapids	Free	
February 14, 2024	DF	4	(United States) Brendan Hines-Ike	(United States) D.C. United	Free	
May 30, 2024	WG	7	(Ghana) Osman Bukari	(Serbia) Red Star Belgrade	$7.5 million	
June 3, 2024	DF	3	(Denmark) Mikkel Desler	(France) Toulouse FC	Undisclosed	
June 24, 2024	DF	21	(Ukraine) Oleksandr Svatok	(Ukraine) SC Dnipro-1	Undisclosed	
June 29, 2024	WG	26	(Liberia) Jimmy Farkarlun	(United States) Austin FC II	Free	

=== Loan in ===
No.	Pos.	Player	Loaned from	Start	End	Source
	DF	(Canada) Salvatore Mazzaferro	(United States) Austin FC II	March 2, 2024	March 5, 2024	
31	MF	(France) Valentin Noël	(United States) Austin FC II	March 2, 2024	March 5, 2024	
39	DF	(United States) Antonio Gomez	(United States) Austin FC II	March 2, 2024; March 8, 2024; March 22, 2024	March 5, 2024; March 11, 2024; March 25, 2024	
26	WG	(Liberia) Jimmy Farkarlun	(United States) Austin FC II	March 8, 2024; March 15, 2024; March 22, 2024	March 11, 2024; March 18, 2024; March 25, 2024	
37	MF	(Mexico) Alonso Ramírez	(United States) Austin FC II	June 15, 2024; June 19, 2024	June 18, 2024; June 22, 2024	
38	MF	(United States) Ervin Torres	(United States) Austin FC II	October 19, 2024	October 19, 2024	

=== Out ===
Date	Position	No.	Name	To	Type	Fee	Ref.
November 17, 2023	DF	26	(United States) Charlie Asensio	(United States) Orange County SC	Declined contract option	N/A	
November 17, 2023	FW	29	(United States) Will Bruin	Retired	Declined contract option	N/A	
November 17, 2023	MF	22	(France) Sofiane Djeffal	(United States) Orange County SC	Declined contract option	N/A	
November 17, 2023	DF	4	(United States) Kipp Keller	(United States) FC Cincinnati	Declined contract option	N/A	
November 17, 2023	DF	21	(Sweden) Adam Lundqvist	(Sweden) BK Häcken	Declined contract option	N/A	
November 17, 2023	FW	28	(United States) Alfonso Ocampo-Chavez		Declined contract option	N/A	
November 17, 2023	FW	11	(Paraguay) Rodney Redes	(Paraguay) Club Olimpia	Declined contract option	N/A	
November 17, 2023	MF	30	(United States) Memo Rodríguez	(United States) Sporting Kansas City	Declined contract option	N/A	
November 17, 2023	FW	37	(Argentina) Maximiliano Urruti	(Argentina) Platense	Declined contract option	N/A	
November 17, 2023	DF	27	(United States) Brandan Craig	(United States) Philadelphia Union	Loan expiration	N/A	
December 11, 2023	DF	24	(United States) Nick Lima	(United States) New England Revolution	Trade	$300,000 in 2024 GAM	
January 9, 2024	DF	3	(Colombia) Jhohan Romaña	(Argentina) San Lorenzo de Almagro	Trade	$750,000	
May 21, 2024	MF	7	(Argentina) Emiliano Rigoni	(Mexico) Club León	Contract buyout	Remainder of salary	
July 1, 2024	FW		(Senegal) Moussa Djitté	(Turkey) Gençlerbirliği S.K.	Mutual Agreement	N/A	

=== Loan out ===
No.	Pos.	Player	Loaned to	Start	End	Source
2	FW	(Senegal) Moussa Djitté	(Turkey) Bandırmaspor	July 3, 2023	July 1, 2024	
12	GK	(United States) Damian Las	(United States) Louisville City FC	February 3, 2024	December 31, 2024	
32	MF	(United States) Micah Burton	(United States) Austin FC II	March 14, 2024	December 31, 2024	
19	MF	(United States) CJ Fodrey	(United States) Austin FC II	March 14, 2024	December 31, 2024	
26	WG	(Liberia) Jimmy Farkarlun	(United States) Austin FC II	June 29, 2024	December 31, 2024	

=== MLS Re-Entry Draft picks ===
2024 Austin FC SuperDraft Picks
Round	Selection	Player	Position	Team	Notes	Ref.
1	1	(Colombia) Jáder Obrian	FW	(United States) FC Dallas	Pick received from Toronto FC	
2	5 (34)	None				

=== MLS SuperDraft picks ===
2024 Austin FC SuperDraft Picks
Round	Selection	Player	Position	College	Notes	Ref.
1	5	(United States) Nate Jones	DF	University of Washington	Traded to Colorado Rapids for $250,000 and the 31st Pick	
2	2 (31)	(United States) Jimmy Farkarlun	MF	UT Rio Grande Valley	Signed to three-year contract with Austin FC II	
2	5 (34)	N/A			Traded to Colorado Rapids	
3	5 (63)	N/A			Traded to Philadelphia Union	

=== New contracts ===
Date	Pos.	No.	Player	Contract until	Ref.
October 31, 2023	MF	13	(United States) Ethan Finlay	2024 + 1yr option	
January 29, 2024	GK	12	(United States) Damian Las	2026 + 1yr option	
April 26, 2024	DF	23	(Slovenia) Žan Kolmanič	2024 + 1yr option	
October 21, 2024	FW	11	(Colombia) Jáder Obrian	2026 + 1yr option	
October 22, 2024	MF	33	(United States) Owen Wolff	2027 + 1yr option	
October 23, 2024	DF	4	(United States) Brendan Hines-Ike	2025 + 1yr option	
October 24, 2024	FW	14	(Chile) Diego Rubio	2025 + 1yr option	

== Non-competitive fixtures ==
=== Preseason ===
January 23	Austin FC	1–1	Philadelphia Union	St. Petersburg, Florida
5:30 pm CST	Pereira 54'	Report	Carranza 37'	Stadium: Al Lang Stadium

January 26	Austin FC	2–1	FC Cincinnati	St. Petersburg, Florida
10:00 am CST	Nöel 13'; Driussi 65'	Report	Boupendza 20'

February 3	Austin FC	3–3	Louisville City FC	Austin, Texas
1:00 pm CST	Obrian; Noël 80'; Zardes	Austin FC; Louisville City FC	Wilson Harris 28'; Ownby 51'	Stadium: St. David's Performance Center
Note: 120 minute game

February 7 Coachella Valley Invitational	Austin FC	0–1	Chicago Fire FC	Indio, California
3:00 pm CST		Report		Stadium: Empire Polo Ground

February 11 Coachella Valley Invitational	Austin FC	3–1	LA Galaxy	Indio, California
12:00 pm CST	Obrian 5'; Rubio 82'; Farkarlun 87'	Report	Vivi 15'	Stadium: Empire Polo Ground

February 14 Coachella Valley Invitational	Austin FC	3–3	New York Red Bulls	Indio, California
3:00 pm CST	Farkarlun 39'; Rubio 60'; Obrian 68'	Report	Carmona 12'; Manoel 35'; Vanzeir 71'	Stadium: Empire Polo Ground

February 17	Austin FC	4–4	New York City FC	Austin, Texas
	Zardes 73'; Driussi 82'; Rubio 87'; Noël 103'	Report	Bakrar 25'; 50'; 94'; 119'	Stadium: Q2 Stadium
Note: Austin 3–2 after 90 minutes, 30 extra minutes played

== Competitive fixtures ==
=== Overall record ===
Competition	First match	Last match	Starting round	Final position	Record							
Competition	First match	Last match	Starting round	Final position	Pld	W	D	L	GF	GA	GD	Win %
MLS Regular Season	February 25, 2024	October 19, 2024	Matchday 1	10th Western Conference, 18th MLS	34	11	9	14	38	46	−8	32.35
Leagues Cup	July 26, 2024	August 7, 2024	Group Stage	Round of 32	3	2	0	1	5	4	+1	66.67
Total					37	13	9	15	43	50	−7	35.14

Last updated: October 19, 2024
Source: Soccerway

=== Major League Soccer Regular Season ===
==== Standings ====
===== Western Conference =====
MLS Western Conference table (2024)
Pos	Team	Pld	W	L	T	GF	GA	GD	Pts	Qualification
8	Vancouver Whitecaps FC	34	13	13	8	52	49	+3	47	Qualification for the wild card round (Note: Vancouver Whitecaps FC did not qualify for the Leagues Cup due to winning the 2024 Canadian Championship, giving them a place in the 2025 CONCACAF Champions Cup. As MLS teams could participate in no more than two cup competitions, their spot in the Leagues Cup was given to San Diego FC.)
9	Portland Timbers	34	12	11	11	65	56	+9	47	Qualification for the wild card round and the Leagues Cup
10	Austin FC	34	11	14	9	39	48	−9	42	
11	FC Dallas	34	11	15	8	54	56	−2	41	
12	St. Louis City SC	34	8	13	13	50	63	−13	37	

Source: MLS
Rules for classification: 1) points; 2) total wins; 3) total goal differential; 4) total goals scored; 5) fewer disciplinary points; 6) away goal differential; 7) away goals scored; 8) home goals differential; 9) home goals scored; 10) coin toss (2 clubs tied) or drawing of lots (≥3 clubs tied)

===== Overall =====
Overall MLS standings table
Pos	Team	Pld	W	L	T	GF	GA	GD	Pts	Qualification
16	New York Red Bulls	34	11	9	14	55	50	+5	47	Qualification for the U.S. Open Cup round of 32 (Note: As one of the best U.S. teams in the overall table to not qualify for the 2025 CONCACAF Champions Cup)
17	CF Montréal	34	11	13	10	48	64	−16	43	
18	Austin FC	34	11	14	9	39	48	−9	42	Qualification for the U.S. Open Cup round of 32 (Note: As one of the U.S. teams who did not qualify for the 2025 CONCACAF Champions Cup or the 2025 Leagues Cup)
19	FC Dallas	34	11	15	8	54	56	−2	41	Qualification for the U.S. Open Cup round of 32
20	Atlanta United FC	34	10	14	10	46	49	−3	40	

Source: MLS
Rules for classification: 1) points; 2) total wins; 3) total goal differential; 4) total goals scored; 5) fewer disciplinary points; 6) away goal differential; 7) away goals scored; 8) home goals differential; 9) home goals scored; 10) coin toss (2 clubs tied) or drawing of lots (≥3 clubs tied)

==== Matches ====
Matchday	Date	Opponent	Venue	Location	Result (Note: Austin FC's score written first)	Scorers	Attendance	Referee	Position
1	February 24	Minnesota United FC	Q2 Stadium	Austin, Texas	1–2	Biro 90+2'	20,738	Trevor Wiseman	24th
2	March 2	Seattle Sounders FC	Lumen Field	Seattle, Washington	0–0		30,067	Rafael Santos	23rd
3	March 9	St. Louis City SC	Q2 Stadium	Austin, Texas	2–2	Hedges 14', Cascante 51'	20,738	Guilherme Cerretta	22nd
4	March 16	Philadelphia Union	Q2 Stadium	Austin, Texas	2–2	Rubio 56'; Gallagher 58'	20,738	Wesley Costa	25th
5	March 23	Orlando City SC	Inter&Co Stadium	Orlando, Florida	0–2		20,985	Esteban Rosano	27th
6	March 30; Copa Tejas	FC Dallas	Q2 Stadium	Austin, Texas	2–1	Cascante 54'; Rubio 70'	20,738	Rosendo Mendoza	22nd
7	April 6	San Jose Earthquakes	Q2 Stadium	Austin, Texas	4–3	Driussi 62' (pen.), 90+11; Obrian 63'; Biro 67'	20,738	Lukasz Szpala	16th
8	April 14	St. Louis City SC	CityPark	St. Louis, Missouri	0–1		22,423	Ted Unkel	21st
9	April 20; Copa Tejas	Houston Dynamo FC	Shell Energy Stadium	Houston, Texas	1–0	Rigoni 86'	20,115	Rubiel Vazquez	14th
10	April 27	LA Galaxy	Q2 Stadium	Austin, Texas	2–0	Rubio 7'; Obrian 19'	20,738	Victor Rivas	11th
11	May 4	Vancouver Whitecaps FC	BC Place	Vancouver, British Columbia	0–0		32,465	Marcos DeOliveira II	10th
12	May 11; Copa Tejas	FC Dallas	Toyota Stadium	Frisco, Texas	1–2	Driussi 62' (pen.)	19,096	Jair Marrufo	15th
13	May 15; Copa Tejas	Houston Dynamo FC	Q2 Stadium	Austin, Texas	1–0	Driussi 87'	20,738	Filip Dujic	12th
14	May 18	Sporting Kansas City	Q2 Stadium	Austin, Texas	3–2	Obrian 28', 39'; Driussi 46'	20,738	Sergii Boiko	8th
15	May 25	San Jose Earthquakes	PayPal Park	San Jose, California	1–1	Hines-Ike 45'	13,744	Chris Penso	10th
16	May 29	Portland Timbers	Q2 Stadium	Austin, Texas	0–2		20,738	Victor Rivas	11th
17	June 1	Real Salt Lake	America First Field	Sandy, Utah	1–5	Ring 90'+2' (pen.)	21,078	Alexis Da Silva	12th
18	June 15	Colorado Rapids	Dick's Sporting Goods Park	Commerce City, Colorado	0–2		17,433	Malik Badawi	15th
19	June 19	Los Angeles FC	Q2 Stadium	Austin, Texas	1–1	Obrian 19'	20,738	Ted Unkel	16th
20	June 22	Minnesota United FC	Allianz Field	Saint Paul, Minnesota	0–1	Rubio 31'	19,746	Drew Fischer	14th
21	June 29	Sporting Kansas City	Children's Mercy Park	Kansas City, Kansas	0–2		18,722	Filip Dujic	16th
22	July 6	New York City FC	Q2 Stadium	Austin, Texas	2–1	Zardes 45+7', 69'	20,738	Timothy Ford	15th
23	July 13	Seattle Sounders FC	Q2 Stadium	Austin, Texas	0–1		20,738	Jair Marrufo	17th
24	July 17; Copa Tejas	FC Dallas	Toyota Stadium	Frisco, Texas	1–3	Zardes 16'		Armando Villarreal	17th
25	July 20	Charlotte FC	Q2 Stadium	Austin, Texas	2–2	Ring 11'; Gallagher 80'	20,738	Jon Freemon	17th
26	August 24	Nashville SC	Geodis Park	Nashville, Tennessee	2–0	Gallgher 43'; Bukari 84'	28,876	Rosendo Mendoza	16th
27	August 31	Vancouver Whitecaps FC	Q2 Stadium	Austin, Texas	0–1		20,738	Mark Allatin	17th
28	September 14	Toronto FC	BMO Field	Toronto, Ontario	1–2	Wolff 75'	25,538	Chris Penso	19th
29	September 18	Los Angeles FC	BMO Stadium	Los Angeles, California	1–1	Obrian 45+2'	22,153	Allen Chapman	18th
30	September 21; Copa Tejas	Houston Dynamo FC	Q2 Stadium	Austin, Texas	0–1		20,738	Victor Rivas	19th
31	September 28	Real Salt Lake	Q2 Stadium	Austin, Texas	2–2	Obrian 82'; Biro 89'	20,738	Lukasz Szpala	21st
32	October 2	Portland Timbers	Providence Park	Portland, Oregon	1–0	Pereira 42'		Alexis Da Silva	18th
33	October 5	LA Galaxy	Dignity Health Sports Park	Carson, California	1–2	Driussi 55'	26,574	Ted Unkel	19th
34	October 19	Colorado Rapids	Q2 Stadium	Austin, Texas	3–2	Driussi 8' (p); Finlay 90+1'; Hines-Ike 90+3'	20,738	Chris Penso	18th

=== MLS Playoffs ===
On October 5, Austin feel 1–2 to the LA Galaxy, officially missing the playoff cut for the 2024 season.

=== U.S. Open Cup ===
Austin FC II represented the club in the 2024 U.S. Open Cup based on a deal reached between U.S. Soccer and MLS.

=== Leagues Cup ===
==== West 1 ====
Pos	Team	Pld	W	PW	PL	L	GF	GA	GD	Pts	Qualification	AUS	UNM	MTY
1	(United States Soccer Federation) Austin FC	2	2	0	0	0	5	2	+3	6	Advance to knockout stage	—	—	—
2	(Mexican Football Federation) UNAM	2	0	1	0	1	3	4	−1	2	Advance to knockout stage	2–3	—	—
3	(Mexican Football Federation) Monterrey	2	0	0	1	1	1	3	−2	1		0–2	1–1	—

Source: Leagues Cup
Rules for classification: Tiebreakers

Matchday	Date	Opponent	Venue	Location	Result (Note: Austin FC's score written first)	Scorers	Attendance	Referee
Group Stage	July 26	(Mexico) UNAM	Q2 Stadium	Austin, Texas	3–2	Ring 8', Zardes 45', Driussi 55'	N/A	Julio Luna
Group Stage	July 30	(Mexico) Monterrey	Q2 Stadium	Austin, Texas	2–0	Obrian 61'; Pereira 79'	N/A	Daniel Quintero
Round of 32	August 7	(United States) LAFC	BMO Stadium	Los Angeles, California	0–2		12,930	Jon Freemon

== Statistics ==
=== Appearances and goals ===
Numbers after plus–sign (+) denote appearances as a substitute.

No.	Pos	Nat	Player	Total		MLS		Other (Note: Appearance(s) in 2024 Leagues Cup)	
No.	Pos	Nat	Player	Apps	Goals	Apps	Goals	Apps	Goals
1	GK	(United States) USA	Brad Stuver	36	0	34+0	0	2+0	0
2	DF	(United States) USA	Matt Hedges	18	1	10+5	1	3+0	0
3	DF	(Denmark) DEN	Mikkel Desler	10	0	6+1	0	2+1	0
4	DF	(United States) USA	Brendan Hines-Ike	31	2	25+3	2	3+0	0
5	MF	(Colombia) COL	Jhojan Valencia	29	0	14+12	0	0+3	0
6	MF	(Venezuela) VEN	Daniel Pereira	29	2	23+3	2	3+0	0
7	MF	(Ghana) GHA	Osman Bukari	11	1	8+1	1	2+0	0
8	MF	(Finland) FIN	Alexander Ring	37	3	29+5	2	3+0	1
9	FW	(United States) USA	Gyasi Zardes	36	4	10+23	3	3+0	1
10	MF	(Argentina) ARG	Sebastián Driussi	30	8	26+1	7	3+0	1
11	FW	(Colombia) COL	Jáder Obrian	36	8	30+4	7	2+0	1
13	MF	(United States) USA	Ethan Finlay	21	1	10+11	1	0+0	0
14	FW	(Chile) CHI	Diego Rubio	35	4	23+9	4	0+3	0
15	DF	(Finland) FIN	Leo Väisänen	14	0	9+4	0	0+1	0
16	DF	(United States) USA	Hector Jiménez	15	0	6+9	0	0+0	0
17	FW	(Republic of Ireland) IRL	Jon Gallagher	35	3	30+2	3	3+0	0
18	DF	(Costa Rica) CRC	Julio Cascante	27	2	21+4	2	0+2	0
19	MF	(United States) USA	CJ Fodrey	12	0	0+12	0	0+0	0
20	GK	(United States) USA	Matt Bersano	0	0	0+0	0	0+0	0
21	DF	(Ukraine) UKR	Oleksandr Svatok	6	0	4+2	0	0+0	0
23	DF	(Slovenia) SLO	Žan Kolmanič	16	0	6+9	0	0+1	0
26	FW	(Liberia) LBR	Jimmy Farkarlun	1	0	0+1	0	0+0	0
29	DF	(Brazil) BRA	Guilherme Biro	34	3	26+5	3	3+0	0
30	GK	(United States) USA	Stefan Cleveland	1	0	0+0	0	1+0	0
31	MF	(France) FRA	Valentin Noël	0	0	0+0	0	0+0	0
32	MF	(United States) USA	Micah Burton	0	0	0+0	0	0+0	0
33	MF	(United States) USA	Owen Wolff	36	1	17+16	1	1+2	0
37	MF	(Mexico) MEX	Alonso Ramírez	2	0	0+2	0	0+0	0
38	MF	(United States) USA	Ervin Torres	1	0	0+1	0	0+0	0
39	DF	(United States) USA	Antonio Gomez	0	0	0+0	0	0+0	0
	FW	(Argentina) ARG	Emiliano Rigoni	11	1	7+4	1	0+0	0
	DF	(Canada) CAN	Salvatore Mazzaferro	0	0	0+0	0	0+0	0

- Last updated: October 19, 2024
- Source: https://www.austinfc.com/stats/

=== Top scorers ===
Rank	Position	Number	Name	MLS	Leagues Cup	Total
1	MF	10	(Argentina) Sebastián Driussi	7	1	8
1	FW	11	(Colombia) Jáder Obrian	7	1	8
3	FW	9	(United States) Gyasi Zardes	3	1	4
3	FW	14	(Chile) Diego Rubio	4	0	4
5	MF	8	(Finland) Alexander Ring	2	1	3
5	DF	17	(Republic of Ireland) Jon Gallagher	3	0	3
5	DF	29	(Brazil) Guilherme Biro	3	0	3
8	DF	4	(United States) Brendan Hines-Ike	2	0	2
8	MF	6	(Venezuela) Daniel Pereira	1	1	2
8	DF	18	(Costa Rica) Julio Cascante	2	0	2
10	DF	2	(United States) Matt Hedges	1	0	1
10	MF	7	(Ghana) Osman Bukari	1	0	1
10	MF	13	(United States) Ethan Finlay	1	0	1
10	MF	33	(United States) Owen Wolff	1	0	1
10	MF		(Argentina) Emiliano Rigoni	1	0	1
Total				39	5	44

- Last updated: October 19, 2024
- Source: https://www.austinfc.com/stats/

=== Top assists ===
Rank	Position	Number	Name	MLS	Other (Note: Appearance(s) in Leagues Cup)	Total
1	MF	8	(Finland) Alexander Ring	7	1	8
2	MF	6	(Venezuela) Daniel Pereira	5	1	6
3	MF	10	(Argentina) Sebastián Driussi	4	1	5
3	MF	33	(United States) Owen Wolff	4	1	5
5	DF	17	(Republic of Ireland) Jon Gallagher	3	1	4
6	DF	11	(Colombia) Jáder Obrian	3	0	3
6	DF	23	(Slovenia) Žan Kolmanič	3	0	3
8	MF	7	(Ghana) Osman Bukari	2	0	2
8	FW	9	(United States) Gyasi Zardes	2	0	2
8	DF	16	(United States) Hector Jiménez	2	0	2
11	DF	4	(United States) Brendan Hines-Ike	1	0	1
11	MF	5	(Colombia) Jhojan Valencia	1	0	1
11	FW	14	(Chile) Diego Rubio	1	0	1
11	MF	19	(United States) CJ Fodrey	1	0	1
Total				37	5	42

- Last updated: October 19, 2024
- Source: https://www.austinfc.com/stats/

=== Clean sheets ===
Rank	Number	Name	MLS	Leagues Cup	Total
1	1	(United States) Brad Stuver	8	1	9

- Last updated: October 19, 2024
- Source: https://www.austinfc.com/stats/

=== Disciplinary record ===
No.	Pos.	Player	MLS			Other (Note: Appearance(s) in Leagues Cup)			Total		
No.	Pos.	Player	Yellow card	(yellow card) (yellow-red card)	Red card	Yellow card	(yellow card) (yellow-red card)	Red card	Yellow card	(yellow card) (yellow-red card)	Red card
1	GK	(United States) Brad Stuver	2	0	0	0	0	0	2	0	0
2	DF	(United States) Matt Hedges	1	0	0	0	0	0	1	0	0
3	DF	(Denmark) Mikkel Desler	1	0	0	2	0	0	3	0	0
4	DF	(United States) Brendan Hines-Ike	4	1	0	0	0	0	4	1	0
5	MF	(Colombia) Jhojan Valencia	8	0	0	0	0	0	8	0	0
6	MF	(Venezuela) Daniel Pereira	9	0	0	1	0	0	10	0	0
7	MF	(Ghana) Osman Bukari	1	0	0	0	1	0	1	1	0
8	MF	(Finland) Alexander Ring	5	0	0	0	0	0	5	0	0
9	FW	(United States) Gyasi Zardes	2	0	0	0	0	0	2	0	0
10	MF	(Argentina) Sebastián Driussi	6	0	1	0	0	0	6	0	1
11	FW	(Colombia) Jáder Obrian	5	0	0	1	0	0	6	0	0
13	MF	(United States) Ethan Finlay	1	0	0	0	0	0	1	0	0
14	FW	(Chile) Diego Rubio	8	0	0	0	0	0	8	0	0
15	DF	(Finland) Leo Väisänen	0	0	0	0	0	0	0	0	0
16	CB	(United States) Hector Jiménez	2	0	0	0	0	0	2	0	0
17	DF	(Republic of Ireland) Jon Gallagher	5	0	0	0	0	0	5	0	0
18	CB	(Costa Rica) Julio Cascante	11	0	0	0	0	0	11	0	0
19	MF	(United States) CJ Fodrey	3	0	0	0	0	0	3	0	0
20	GK	(United States) Matt Bersano	0	0	0	0	0	0	0	0	0
21	DF	(Ukraine) Oleksandr Svatok	1	0	0	0	0	0	1	0	0
23	LB	(Slovenia) Žan Kolmanič	2	0	0	0	0	0	2	0	0
26	WG	(Liberia) Jimmy Farkarlun	0	0	0	0	0	0	0	0	0
29	DF	(Brazil) Guilherme Biro	5	0	1	1	0	0	6	0	1
30	GK	(United States) Stefan Cleveland	0	0	0	1	0	0	1	0	0
31	MF	(France) Valentin Noël	0	0	0	0	0	0	0	0	0
32	MF	(United States) Micah Burton	0	0	0	0	0	0	0	0	0
33	MF	(United States) Owen Wolff	4	0	0	0	0	0	4	0	0
37	MF	(Mexico) Alonso Ramírez	0	0	0	0	0	0	0	0	0
39	DF	(United States) Antonio Gomez	0	0	0	0	0	0	0	0	0
	DF	(Canada) Salvatore Mazzaferro	0	0	0	0	0	0	0	0	0
	FW	(Argentina) Emiliano Rigoni	0	0	0	0	0	0	0	0	0
Total			65	1	2	7	1	0	72	2	2

- Last updated: October 19, 2024
- Source: https://www.austinfc.com/stats/

Notes;

== Awards and honors ==
=== End-of-season awards ===
Award	Winner	Ref
Defensive Players of the Year	(United States) Brad Stuver	
Defensive Players of the Year	(United States) Brendan Hines-Ike	
Offensive Player of the Year	(Colombia) Jáder Obrian	

=== MLS Team of the Matchday ===
Matchday	Player	Opponent	Position	Ref
3	(Colombia) Jhojan Valencia	Seattle Sounders FC	Bench	
5	(Republic of Ireland) Jon Gallagher	Philadelphia Union	DF	
7	(Costa Rica) Julio Cascante	FC Dallas	DF	
8	(Argentina) Sebastián Driussi	San Jose Earthquakes	MF	
10	(United States) Brad Stuver	Houston Dynamo FC	Bench	
11	(Colombia) Jáder Obrian	LA Galaxy	FW	
11	(United States) Josh Wolff	LA Galaxy	Coach	
12	(United States) Brad Stuver (2)	Vancouver Whitecaps FC	Bench	
14	(Argentina) Sebastián Driussi (2)	Houston Dynamo FC	MF	
15	(Venezuela) Daniel Pereira	Sporting Kansas City	MF	
15	(Colombia) Jáder Obrian (2)	Sporting Kansas City	Bench	
16	(United States) Brendan Hines-Ike	San Jose Earthquakes	Bench	
22	(Chile) Diego Rubio	Minnesota United FC	Bench	
25	(United States) Gyasi Zardes	New York City FC	FW	
29	(United States) Brad Stuver (3)	Nashville SC	GK	
33	(United States) Brad Stuver (4)	Nashville SC	Bench	
36	(United States) Brad Stuver (5)	Portland Timbers	GK	
38	(Slovenia) Žan Kolmanič	Colorado Rapids	Bench	
