= Micah Burton =

American soccer player (born 2006)

Personal information
- Date of birth: March 26, 2006 (age 20)
- Place of birth: Mounds View, Minnesota, U.S.
- Height: 1.72 m (5 ft 8 in)
- Position: Midfielder

Team information
- Current team: Austin FC
- Number: 32

Youth career
- –2020: Minnesota United
- 2020–2023: Austin FC

Senior career*
Years	Team	Apps	(Gls)
2023	Austin FC II	21	(2)
2024–	Austin FC	4	(0)
2024–	→ Austin FC II (loan)	62	(12)

International career^{‡}
2022	United States U16	4	(2)
2022–2023	United States U17	11	(3)
2025	United States U19	1	(0)
2025–	United States U20	2	(0)
- * Club domestic league appearances and goals as of 21:31, November 8, 2026 (UTC) ‡ National team caps and goals as of 00:25, November 20, 2025 (UTC)

Micah Aiden Burton (born March 26, 2006) is an American professional soccer player who plays as a midfielder for Major League Soccer club Austin FC.

== Early career ==
Burton was a member of Austin FC U15 team that made the quarterfinals of the MLS Next Cup playoff for the inaugural 2020–2021 season. Burton was a member of the Austin FC U17 for the 2022–2023 season. Burton earned honorable mention for the Best XI in the 2022 MLS Next Gerneration Cup. Burton's team qualified for the MLS Next Playoffs for the 2022 season, losing in the quarterfinals to Orlando City FC Academy. Burton started the 2022–2023 MLS Next season with the U-17 team, before signing with Austin FC II.

== Club career ==
=== Austin FC II ===
On March 23, 2023, Burton signed his first professional contract with Austin FC II, after working out with the first team during the pre-season. Burton made 18 appearances during the MLS Next Pro regular season, scoring two goals and making three more appearances in the playoffs, including in the MLS Next Cup final, which was won by Austin FC 3–1 over Columbus Crew II. On March 14, 2024, Austin FC loaned Burton to Austin FC II for the 2024 MLS Next Pro season. Burton remains eligible for the Austin FC first team during the 2024 season. In March 2025, Burton signed a season long loan with Austin FC II. In February 2026, Burton was placed on a season–long loan with Austin FC II, his third season on loan to the second team.

=== Austin FC ===
On January 10, 2024, Austin FC announced they had signed Burton as a homegrown player on a four-year contract, with an optional additional year. Burton made his first appearance with the first team on April 22, 2026 in a 1–5 loss to San Jose Earthquakes. Burton was subbed in at the 87th minute, getting his first 17 minutes at the Division I level.

== International career ==
Born in the United States, Burton is of Cambodian descent through his mother. He got his first call up to train with U.S. Under-17 MYNT in November 2021 as part of a training camp in preparation for the 2022–2023 cycle leading to the 2023 FIFA U-17 World Cup. Burton was called back into camp in March 2022 for friendlies against Uruguay and Argentina. In February 2023, U.S. Soccer announced that Burton had been called up for the 2023 CONCACAF U-17 Championship, where he made six appearances, scoring three goals. In October 2023, Burton was selected for the under-17 team that would represent the U.S. for the 2023 FIFA U-17 World Cup. Burton made four appearances and scored one game in that tournament. In May 2025, U.S. Soccer announced that Burton had been called up for the United States U–19's June 2025 friendlies.

== Career statistics ==
=== Club statistics ===
As of matched played November 7, 2026

Appearances and goals by club, season and competition
Club	League	Season	League		League Cup		National cup (Note: Includes U.S. Open Cup)		Other		Total	
Club	League	Season	Apps	Goals	Apps	Goals	Apps	Goals	Apps	Goals	Apps	Goals
Austin FC II	2023	MLS Next Pro	21	2	3 (Note: Appearance(s) in MLSNP Playoffs)	0	–		–		24	2
Austin FC II (loan)	2024	MLS Next Pro	27	6	–		1	0	–		28	6
Austin FC II (loan)	2025	MLS Next Pro	22	4	–		–		–		22	4
Austin FC II (loan)	2026	MLS Next Pro	14	3	1	0	–		–		15	3
Austin FC	2024	Major League Soccer	0	0	–		–		0	0	0	0
Austin FC	2025	Major League Soccer	0	0	0	0	0	0	–		0	0
Austin FC	2026	Major League Soccer	4	0	–		0	0	0	0	4	0
Career total			88	15	4	0	1	0	0	0	93	15

=== International statistics ===
As of match played June 7, 2025

Year	Apps	Goals
United States USMYNT U-16
2022	3	1
United States MYNT U-17
2022	3	1
2023	10	3
United States MYNT U-19
2025	1	0
United States MYNT U-20
2025	2	0
Total	19	5

== Honors ==
Austin FC II

- MLS Next Pro: Champions – 2023
- MLS Next Pro: Regular Season Champion – 2026

United States U17

- CONCACAF U-17 Championship: Runners-up – 2023
