= CJ Fodrey =

American soccer player (born 2004)

Personal information
- Full name: Calvin Jay Fodrey
- Date of birth: February 10, 2004 (age 22)
- Place of birth: San Jose, California, U.S.
- Height: 6 ft 2 in (1.88 m)
- Positions: Winger; forward

Team information
- Current team: Falkirk (on loan from Austin FC)
- Number: 99

Youth career
- Albion SC
- San Diego Surf
- 2016–2019: San Diego Nomads
- 2019–2020: LA Galaxy

College career
Years	Team	Apps	(Gls)
2022	San Diego State Aztecs	18	(7)

Senior career*
Years	Team	Apps	(Gls)
2021–2022	San Diego Loyal	5	(1)
2023–	Austin FC	50	(1)
2023–2026	→ Austin FC II (loan)	45	(14)
2026–	→ Falkirk (loan)	10	(0)
- * Club domestic league appearances and goals as of 18:00, November 8, 2026 (UTC)

Calvin Jay "CJ" Fodrey (born February 10, 2004) is an American soccer player who plays as a forward for Scottish Premiership club Falkirk on loan from Major League Soccer club Austin FC

== Career ==
=== Youth ===
Born in California, Fodrey began his career with local San Diego–based clubs Albion Pros Club, San Diego Surf, and San Diego Nomads. He then joined the youth setup of Major League Soccer club LA Galaxy in 2019.

=== San Diego Loyal ===
Towards the end of 2020, Fodrey was invited to tryout with USL Championship club San Diego Loyal by the club assistant coach Nate Miller. He impressed during the trial and signed a USL academy contract with the club in December 2020. He scored his first goal for the club in their pre-season match against his former club LA Galaxy.

On May 22, 2021, Fodrey made his professional debut for San Diego Loyal against Louisville City, coming on as an 81st-minute substitute in the 1–2 defeat.

=== San Diego State ===
In the fall of 2022, Fodrey joined San Diego State University to play college soccer. In his freshman season, Fodrey made 18 appearances, scoring seven goals and tallying four assists for the Aztecs. Fodrey was named All-Pac 12 First Team and Pac-12 Freshman of the Year in his debut college season.

On December 19, 2022, it was announced that Fodrey would leave college early, signing a Generation Adidas contract with Major League Soccer and entering the 2023 MLS SuperDraft.

=== Austin FC ===
On December 21, 2022, Fodrey was drafted 13th overall in the 2023 MLS SuperDraft by Austin FC. Fodrey made his first team debut in the 3–1 loss to FC Juárez in the Leagues Cup.

CJ scored arguably the club's biggest goal in the club's short history when he scored the go ahead goal in the 120th minute vs Minnesota united in the US open cup semi final to send Austin to the club's ever first ever final

==== Loan to Austin FC II ====
At the beginning of the 2023 season it was announced that Fodrey was being loaned to Austin FC II for their inaugural season. Fodrey came on as a sub at the left winger position for Austin FC II, earning an assist and forcing an own goal, when they won the 2023 MLS Next Pro Cup, beating the Columbus Crew 2 by a score of 3–1. Prior to the 2024 season, Austin FC announced they would loan Fodrey to the second team for the 2024 season.

==== Loan to Falkirk ====
Fodrey signed with Scottish Premiership club Falkirk on loan for their 2026–27 season on August 26, 2026.

== Career statistics ==
As of match played September 5, 2026

Appearances and goals by club, season and competition
Club	Season	League			National cup (Note: Includes U.S. Open Cup and Scottish Cup)		Continental		Playoffs		Other		Total	
Club	Season	Division	Apps	Goals	Apps	Goals	Apps	Goals	Apps	Goals	Apps	Goals	Apps	Goals
San Diego Loyal	2021	USL Championship	2	1	0	0	―		0	0	―		2	1
San Diego Loyal	2022	USL Championship	3	0	1	0	―		0	0	―		4	0
San Diego Loyal	Total		5	1	1	0	―		0	0	―		6	1
Austin FC	2023	Major League Soccer	3	0	0	0	0	0	―		1 (Note: Appearance(s) in Leagues Cup)	0	4	0
Austin FC	2024	Major League Soccer	12	0	―		―		―		0	0	12	0
Austin FC	2025	Major League Soccer	22	1	3	1	―		2 (Note: Appearances in MLS Cup playoffs)	0	―		27	2
Austin FC	2026	Major League Soccer	14	0	1	1	―		0	0	0	0	15	1
Austin FC	Total		51	1	4	2	0	0	2	0	1	0	58	3
Austin FC II (loan)	2023	MLS Next Pro	21	4	―		―		2 (Note: Appearance(s) in MLSNP Playoffs)	0	―		23	4
Austin FC II (loan)	2024	MLS Next Pro	17	9	1	0	―		―		―		18	9
Austin FC II (loan)	2025	MLS Next Pro	6	1	―		―		―		―		6	1
Austin FC II (loan)	2026	MLS Next Pro	1	0	―		―		―		―		1	0
Austin FC II (loan)	Total		45	14	6	0	0	0	2	0	0	0	53	14
Falkirk (loan)	2026–27	Scottish Premiership	3	0	0	0	―		―		―		3	0
Career total			104	16	6	2	0	0	4	0	1	0	115	18

== Honors ==
Austin FC II

- MLS Next Pro Cup: Champions – 2023
- MLS Next Pro: Regular Season Champions – 2026
