= Jorge Alastuey =

Spanish footballer (born 2003)

Personal information
- Full name: Jorge Alastuey Aperte
- Date of birth: 14 May 2003 (age 23)
- Place of birth: Zaragoza, Spain
- Height: 1.78 m (5 ft 10 in)
- Position: Midfielder

Team information
- Current team: Austin FC II
- Number: 10

Youth career
- 2006–2013: Stadium Casablanca
- 2013–2016: Zaragoza
- 2016–2022: Barcelona
- 2022–2023: Napoli

Senior career*
Years	Team	Apps	(Gls)
2023–2024	Teruel	26	(2)
2024–2025	ŁKS Łódź	4	(0)
2024–2025	ŁKS Łódź II	5	(0)
2025–2026	Austin FC II	39	(19)
2026	→ Austin FC (loan)	2	(0)
2026–	Austin FC	15	(1)
2026–	→ Austin FC II (loan)	0	(0)
- * Club domestic league appearances and goals as of 21:29, 8 November 2026 (UTC)

Jorge Alastuey Aperte (born 14 May 2003) is a Spanish footballer who plays as a midfielder for MLS Next Pro side Austin FC II.

== Career ==
Born in Zaragoza, Aragon, Alastuey began his career with Stadium Casablanca at the age of three, and spent seven years at the club before moving to Real Zaragoza in 2013. In August 2016, shortly after the passing of his mother, he joined FC Barcelona's La Masia.

In 2019, Alastuey signed a new three-year deal with Barça, but left the club in 2022 after his contract expired. On 30 September of that year, he moved abroad and joined the Primavera squad of Serie A club SSC Napoli.

On 17 July 2023, Alastuey returned to his native region after agreeing to a one-year deal with Primera Federación side CD Teruel. Regularly used as the club suffered relegation, he joined Polish side ŁKS Łódź on 20 August 2024.

On 20 January 2025, Alastuey switched teams and countries again, after being announced at MLS Next Pro side Austin FC II. On 13 March 2026, he signed a short-term agreement with the first team, and made his Major League Soccer debut the following day, coming on as a second-half substitute for Jayden Nelson in a 2–1 away loss to Real Salt Lake.

On 31 July 2026, Alastuey was signed to a first team contract with Austin FC, after having two loan appearances from the second team. He remains eligible for selection for Austin FC II through loan. Alastuey signed through the 2026 season, with an option for both the 2027 MLS sprint season and the 2027–28 MLS season.

== Personal life ==
Alastuey's older brother Nacho is also a footballer and a midfielder. He notably played college soccer for the Florida Atlantic Owls and the George Washington Revolutionaries.

== Career statistics ==
=== Club ===
As of match played 7 November 2026

Appearances and goals by club, season and competition
Club	Season	League			League Cup		National Cup (Note: Includes appearances in Copa del Rey and Polish Cup)		Continental		Other		Total	
Club	Season	Division	Apps	Goals	Apps	Goals	Apps	Goals	Apps	Goals	Apps	Goals	Apps	Goals
Teruel	2023–24	Primera Federación	16	2	—		1	0	—		—		17	2
Łódź II	2024–25	II liga	5	0	—		0	0	—		—		5	0
Łódź	2024–25	I liga	4	0	—		1	0	—		—		5	0
Łódź	Total		9	0	—		1	0	0	0	—		10	0
Austin FC II	2025	MLS Next Pro	24	10	—		0	0	—		—		24	10
Austin FC II	2026	MLS Next Pro	15	9	—		—		—		—		15	9
Austin FC	2026	MLS	17	1	—		0	0	—		3 (Note: Includes appearances in Leagues Cup)	0	20	1
Austin FC	Total		56	20	—		0	0	0	0	3	0	59	20
Career total			81	22	0	0	2	0	0	0	3	0	86	22

== Honors ==
Austin FC II

- MLS Next Pro: Regular Season Champions – 2026

Individual

- MLS Next Pro Best XI: 2026
