= Jimmy Farkarlun =

Liberian footballer (born 2001)

Personal information
- Full name: Bryant Jimmy Farkarlun
- Date of birth: 14 July 2001 (age 25)
- Place of birth: Monrovia, Liberia
- Height: 5 ft 7 in (1.70 m)
- Position: Forward

Team information
- Current team: El Paso Locomotive
- Number: 11

Youth career
- Monrovia Club Breweries
- African United FC

College career
Years	Team	Apps	(Gls)
2020–2022	Houston Christian Huskies	47	(17)
2023	UTRGV Vaqueros	12	(5)

Senior career*
Years	Team	Apps	(Gls)
2022	Houston FC	9	(2)
2024	Austin FC II	12	(2)
2024	→ Austin FC (loan)	0	(0)
2024–2025	Austin FC	1	(0)
2024–2025	→ Austin FC II (loan)	34	(7)
2026–	El Paso Locomotive	15	(2)

International career^{‡}
2025–	Liberia	5	(1)
- * Club domestic league appearances and goals as of 21:03, 8 November 2026 (UTC) ‡ National team caps and goals as of 13 July 2026

Bryant Jimmy Farkarlun (born 14 July 2001) is a Liberian professional footballer who plays for USL Championship side El Paso Locomotive FC and the Liberia national team.

== Early life ==
Farkarlun played youth football with Monrovia Club Breweries. He later played with African United FC.

== College career ==
In 2020, Farkarlun began attending Houston Christian University as a sophomore, where he played for the men's soccer team. He scored his first goal on 20 February 2021 against the Grand Canyon Antelopes. At the end of his first season, he was named a Western Athletic Conference Honorable Mention Team. In September 2022, he was named the WAC Offensive Player of the Week. At the end of his third season in 2022, he was named to the All-WAC Second Team.

In 2023, he began attending University of Texas Rio Grande Valley as a graduate student, where he played for the men's soccer team. He scored his first goal on 8 September 2023 against the Marquette Golden Eagles. In mid-September, he was named the school's Student-Athlete of the Week. On 26 October, he scored a brace in a 3–2 victory over the San Jose State Spartans. He finished tied for the team lead in goals that season with five. At the end of the season, he was named to the All-Western Athletic Conference First Team.

== Club career ==
In 2022, Farkarlun played with Houston FC in USL League Two.

At the 2024 MLS SuperDraft, Farkarlun was selected in the second round (31st overall) by Austin FC. In February 2024, he signed a three-year contract, with two addition option years with their second team, Austin FC II, in MLS Next Pro. In March 2024, he signed three short-term loan agreements with the first team. On 29 June 2024, Austin FC Signed Farkarlun to a first team contract for the remainder of the 2024 season with options for the 2025 and 2026 season, as well as signing him to a loan agreement with Austin FC II, allowing him to play for either team for the rest of the 2024 season. In March 2025, Farkarlun signed a season long loan with Austin FC II.

On 5 March 2026, Farkarlun signed with USL Championship side El Paso Locomotive for the 2026 season.

== International career ==
In November 2024, Farkarlun was called up to the Liberia national team for the first time for 2025 Africa Cup of Nations qualification matches. On 19 March 2025, he made his international debut in a World Cup qualification match against Tunisia.

== Career statistics ==
=== Club ===
As of October 5, 2025

Appearances and goals by club, season and competition
Club	League	Season	League		Playoffs		National cup (Note: Includes appearance in U.S. Open Cup)		Total	
Club	League	Season	Apps	Goals	Apps	Goals	Apps	Goals	Apps	Goals
Houston FC	2022	USL League Two	9	2	–		–		9	2
Austin FC II	2024	MLS Next Pro	12	2	–		1	0	13	2
Austin FC (loan)	2024	Major League Soccer	1	0	–		–		1	0
Austin FC	2024	Major League Soccer	0	0	–		–		0	0
Austin FC	2025	Major League Soccer	0	0	–		0	0	0	0
Austin FC II (loan)	2024	MLS Next Pro	12	2	–		–		12	2
Austin FC II (loan)	2025	MLS Next Pro	22	5	–		–		22	5
Career total			56	11	0	0	1	0	57	11

Notes;

=== International ===
As of match played 31 March 2026

Appearances and goals by national team and year
National team	Year	Apps	Goals
Liberia	2025	4	1
Liberia	2026	1	0
Total		5	1

Scores and results list Liberia's goal tally first, score column indicates score after each Farkarlun goal.

List of international goals scored by Jimmy Farkarlun
No.	Date	Venue	Opponent	Score	Result	Competition
1	24 March 2025	Samuel Kanyon Doe Sports Complex, Paynesville, Liberia	São Tomé and Príncipe	2–0	2–1	2026 FIFA World Cup qualification
