= Marcel Ruszel =

American soccer player (born 2004)

Personal information
- Date of birth: June 21, 2004 (age 22)
- Place of birth: Chicago, Illinois, United States
- Height: 6 ft 2 in (1.88 m)
- Position: Midfielder

Team information
- Current team: Austin FC II

Youth career
- –2020: Sockers FC
- 2020–2021: Legia Warsaw
- 2021–2022: FC Cincinnati
- 2022–2024: Torino

Senior career*
Years	Team	Apps	(Gls)
2022	FC Cincinnati 2	8	(1)
2024–2025	Stal Stalowa Wola	12	(0)
2025–	Austin FC II	25	(1)

International career^{‡}
2019	Poland U15	5	(0)
2019	Poland U16	7	(0)
2022–2023	United States U19	5	(0)
- * Club domestic league appearances and goals as of 23:40, September 14, 2026 (UTC) ‡ National team caps and goals as of August 28, 2023

Marcel Ruszel (born June 21, 2004) is an American professional soccer player who plays as a midfielder for MLS Next Pro club Austin FC II.

== Early life ==
Ruszel started playing and watching football with his father at a young age.

== Club career ==
In 2021, Ruszel almost joined the youth academy of German side 1. FC Koln, but the coronavirus pandemic hindered the transfer. In 2022, he joined the youth academy of Italian Serie A side Torino, where he was regarded as one of the youth team's most important players.

On August 27, 2024, Ruszel joined Polish second-tier club Stal Stalowa Wola. On July 2, 2025, he terminated his contract by mutual consent.

The following day, Ruszel signed with MLS Next Pro club Austin FC II on a deal through the 2027 season with a one-year option.

== International career ==
Ruszel represented Poland internationally at youth level, helping the under-16 team win tournaments in Israel and Finland. In 2022, he switched his allegiance to the United States.

== Personal life ==
Ruszel has an older sister.

== Honors ==
Austin FC II

- MLS Next Pro Regular Season Champion: 2026
