= Djakaria Barro =

Ivorian footballer (born 2002)

Djaka Barro
Personal information
- Full name: Djakaria Barro
- Date of birth: 12 January 2002 (age 24)
- Place of birth: Abobo, Ivory Coast
- Position: Midfielder

Team information
- Current team: Austin II
- Number: 14

Youth career
- Leganés

Senior career*
Years	Team	Apps	(Gls)
2021–2022	Leganés C	1	(0)
2021–2022	→ Cartagena B (loan)	4	(1)
2022–2024	Cartagena B	52	(1)
2022–2024	Cartagena	3	(0)
2024–2025	Mallorca B	7	(0)
2025–	Austin FC II	38	(4)
- * Club domestic league appearances and goals as of 22:37, 24 August 2026 (UTC)

Djakaria "Djaka" Barro (born 12 January 2002) is an Ivorian professional footballer who plays as a midfielder for MLS Next Pro club Austin II.

== Club career ==
Born in Abobo, Barro moved to Spain and was a CD Leganés youth graduate. He made his senior debut with the C-team on 11 April 2021, playing the last 31 minutes in a 1–1 Primera Categoría de Aficionados away draw against CD Los Yébenes San Bruno B.

On 25 August 2021, Barro was loaned to FC Cartagena and was assigned to the reserves in Tercera División RFEF. In October, however, he suffered a serious knee injury, being sidelined for the remainder of the campaign.

On 21 July 2022, Barro returned to Cartagena and their B-team, signing a three-year contract. He made his first team debut on 13 November, coming on as a late substitute for Isak Jansson in a 1–0 away win over CD Alfaro, for the season's Copa del Rey.

Barro made his professional debut on 3 January 2023, replacing Damián Musto in 5–1 home loss against Villarreal CF, also for the national cup.

== Honors ==
Austin FC II

- MLS Next Pro: Regular Season Champion – 2026
