= Nico Van Rijn =

Spanish footballer

Personal information
- Full name: Nicolás Van Rijn Portabella
- Date of birth: 26 March 2001 (age 25)
- Place of birth: Sant Cugat del Vallès, Spain
- Height: 1.92 m (6 ft 4 in)
- Position: Centre-back

Team information
- Current team: Gimnàstic

Youth career
- 2016–2020: Damm

Senior career*
Years	Team	Apps	(Gls)
2020–2021	Lleida Esportiu	10	(0)
2021–2023	Algeciras	39	(0)
2023–2024	Granada B	24	(1)
2024–2025	Austin FC II	23	(1)
2025–2026	Teruel	34	(0)
2026–	Gimnàstic	0	(0)
- * Club domestic league appearances and goals as of 23 May 2026

Nicolás "Nico" Van Rijn Portabella (born 26 March 2001) is a Spanish footballer who plays as a centre-back for Gimnàstic de Tarragona.

== Career ==
Born in Sant Cugat del Vallès, Barcelona, Catalonia to a Dutch father and a Spanish mother, Van Rijn joined CF Damm's youth sides in 2016. On 18 September 2020, after finishing his formation, he signed for Segunda División B side Lleida Esportiu.

On 31 August 2021, Van Rijn moved to Algeciras CF in the newly-created Primera División RFEF. He only established himself as a first-choice in his second season, but moved to Granada CF on 8 August 2023, being assigned to the reserves also in division three.

On 17 July 2024, Van Rijn moved abroad and was announced at MLS Next Pro side Austin FC II on a deal through the 2025 season, with an option for two further years. He signed short-term agreements with the first team in March and June 2025, being an unused substitute in three Major League Soccer matches before terminating his link with the club on 30 June.

On 6 July 2025, Van Rijn returned to his home country and its third division, joining CD Teruel. The following 23 June, after being an undisputed starter, he moved to fellow league team Gimnàstic de Tarragona on a two-year contract.
