= 2024 Austin FC II season =

Austin FC II
2024 season
- Chairman: Anthony Precourt
- Head coach: Brett Uttley
- Stadium: Parmer Field
- MLSNP: Frontier Division: 5th Western Conference: 12th MLSNP: 24th
- MLS Next Pro playoffs: DNQ
- 2024 U.S. Open Cup: First Round
- Top goalscorer: League: CJ Fodrey (9); All: CJ Fodrey (9)
- Biggest win: 3 matches by 2 goals
- Biggest defeat: SLC 4–0 ATX (MLSNP) (6/2); ATXII 2–2 (3–4 p) Foro SC (USOC) (3/19)
Home colors	Away colors
- All statistics correct as of 15:23, October 7, 2024 (UTC).

The 2024 Austin FC II season was the club's second season in MLS Next Pro, the third tier of soccer in the United States. They played in the league's Western Conference. They are the defending MLS Next Pro Cup Champions, after they beat Columbus Crew II 3–1 in the Cup final.

== Background ==
Austin FC started playing in the MLS Western Conference in 2021. In August 2022 it was announced that they would launch a MLS Next Pro team for the 2023 season. On December 13, Austin FC announced that Brett Uttley will be the first coach for Austin FC II. Austin FC II first season was the 2023 season, where they finished the season 2nd in the Western Conference and went on to win the 2023 MLS Next Pro Cup.

== Season ==
=== Preseason ===
After Austin FC announced that they had signed Micah Burton to a contract as a homegrown player, Austin FC II announced the first moves of the season signing goalkeeper Marcus Alstrup as a free agent and winger Christopher Garcia on loan from El Paso Locomotive. On January 19, Austin FC II announced the signing of Ervin Torres, a product of the Austin FC Academy. Torres also has four appearances with the U.S. Men's Youth National Under-16 Team. On January 31, Austin FC II announced two more free agent signings. Bringing in Anthony García a 20-year-old winger who spent last season with the Santos Laguna Under-23 squad and Aaron Cervantes a U.S. youth international who spent last season with LA Galaxy II. On February 20, 2024, Austin FC II announced the signing of both winger Bryant "Jimmy" Farkarlun and defender Antonio Gomez. Farkarlun was signed to a three-year contract with an option for two additional years, and Gomez signed a two-year contract with an option for two additional years. On February 27, Austin FC II announced the re-signing of Ugandan midfielder Bobosi Byaruhanga on loan from Czech side MFK Vyškov and the acquisition of Spanish defender Rubén Bonachera from Polish side Wisła Kraków II. On March 1, 2024, U.S. Soccer announced changes to the 2024 U.S. Open Cup. These changes allowed MLS affiliated MLS Next Pro teams to participate in the Open Cup. Austin FC II was given a spot in the first round of the 2024 U.S. Open Cup. On March 8, Austin FC II announced they had transferred their 2023 leading scorer, Valentin Noël to the Las Vegas Lights for an undisclosed amount. On March 14, prior to the first game of the season, Austin FC II announced roster moves to prepare for the season. Both Micah Burton and CJ Fodrey were signed on loan from Austin FC and six players signed amateur agreements with the team, including defender Drake Fournier, defender Mason Miller, forward Joah Reyna, goalkeeper Spencer Sanderson, winger Luka Spadafora, and defender Gavin Wolff.

=== March/April ===
Austin FC II started the season with a 1–3 loss to Tacoma Defiance, with the lone goal coming from Bryan Arelleno 83 minutes into the match. In their first road game of the season, Austin FC II picked up their first win, beating Houston Dynamo 2 1–0 on a goal in the 80th minute by CJ Fodrey. On April 20, Austin travelled to The Town FC, earning a draw in a 0–0 game, but dropping a point in the shootout, losing 2–4. Austin FC II closed out the month of April, with a 2–2 against Ventura County FC, and again failed to earn the second point falling 4–5 in the shootout.

==== U.S. Open Cup ====
In their first ever U.S. Open Cup, Austin FC II fell in a penalty kick shootout to the amateur side Foro SC. After finishing 120 minutes in a 2–2 draw off goals by Salvatore Mazzaferro and Sébastien Pineau, Austin fell 3–4 in the penalty shootout.

=== May/June ===
To start the month of May Austin FC II traveled to Denver, CO to take on Colorado Rapids 2, earning a 2–1 win on goals from Bobosi Byaruhanga and Ervin Torres. On May 12, Austin FC II fell 2–1 to St. Louis City 2 on a goal during stoppage time. Austin FC II hosted Sporting Kansas City II on May 17, earning two paints after a 2–2 draw, but winning the shootout 5–4. On 24 May 2024, Austin fell to LAFC 2 2–1 on an extra time goal. Austin's lone goal was scored by Jimmy Farkarlun, his second of the season. The day after the first team suffered their worse loss of the season, FCito followed suit with their worse loss of the season, falling 4–0 to the Real Monarchs. Continuing to struggle on the road, Austin FC II earned a 1–1 draw against Colorado Rapids 2 and lost the shootout 5–3. After the international break, Austin FC II captured two points against Portland Timbers 2 drawing 0–0 during regulation, but winning the shootout 5–4. Austin FC II earned another draw against North Texas SC in their highest scoring game of the yar, but dropped a point in the shootout. Austin FC II closed out June by earning another draw against Sporting KC II, dropping a point in the shootout falling 5–3.

=== July/August ===
Austin FC II started the month of July, by earning a 2–0 win against Real Salt Lake on goals from CJ Fodrey and Alonso Ramírez. Playing on th road in Shell Energy Stadium, Austin FC II dropped three points losing 2–0. After going out to a two-goal led on goals by Jimmy Farkarlun and Bobosi Byaruhanga, Austin let Minnesota come back and draw the game 2–2 in the 90th minute, but only were able to earn one point after falling 2–3 in the shootout. On July 27, 2024, Austin FC II played in the MLS Next Pro invitation against Cancún F.C. the 2023–24 Liga de Expansión MX Champions. Austin earne a 2–1 win against the Mexican 2nd division champions on goals from Micah Burton and Alonso Ramirez. After their first international match, Austin FC II earned two points, against one of the top teams in the Western Division, North Texas SC, winning the shootout 5–4. In their next match, Micah Burton's brace helped Austin FC II earn one point in a draw with Portland Timbers 2, though they dropped a point in the shootout 8–7. To close out the MLS mid-season transfer portal, Austin FC II signed Irish forward Peter Grogan from Bray Wanderers. Austin FC II continued their mid-season success, earning three points against Sporting Kansas City II on goals from CJ Fodrey and Ervin Torres. Austin FC II closed out the month of August with another win, beating Minnesota United FC 2 by a score of 2–1 on goals by CJ Fodrey and Salvatore Mazzaferro. Austin head into the month of September one place out of the MLSNP playoffs.

=== September/October ===
Austin started the last month of their season with an away trip to St. Louis City FC 2. Austin had a strong performance, taking the lead twice in the game, but fell 3–2 after giving away two penalties. The following week Austin went to Minnesota, but fell a goal short, losing 2–3. Anthony Garcia scored his first goal of the season and Diego Abarca netting his second of the season. Austin returned home to face their in state rivals Houston, earning a 3–1 victory to bring them one place out of a playoff position. Micah Burton netted a brace and Alonso Ramirez scored he third on a penalty. Facing North Texas SC with playoff hopes on the line, Austin fell 2–1 at Choctaw Stadium after Bobosi Byaruhanga tied the game in the 83rd minute. Austin gave Vancouver a hard fought match, earning two points, winning the shootout 5–4 after the game concluded 1–1. Austin's season concluded on the last day of the regular season when the fell to The Town FC is 3–4.

== Management team ==
Position	Name
Chairman	(United States) Anthony Precourt
Sporting Director	Rodolfo Borrell
Head coach	(United States) Brett Uttley
Assistant coach	(United States) Dennis Sanchez
Assistant coach	(United States) Chris Harmon
Assistant coach	
Goalkeeping coach	(Canada) Cameron Sauro
Fitness coach	

== Roster ==
As of October 6, 2024.

No.	Name	Nationality	Position(s)	Date of birth (age)	Signed in	Previous club	Apps	Goals
Goalkeepers
1	Marcus Alstrup	(Denmark)	Goalkeeper	March 24, 2004 (age 22)	2024	(Denmark) B93	22	0
20	Aaron Cervantes	(United States)	Goalkeeper	March 20, 2002 (age 24)	2024	(United States) LA Galaxy II	7	0
30	Spencer Sanderson	(United States)	Goalkeeper		2023	(United States) Austin FC Academy	0	0
Defenders
2	Cheick Touré	(Netherlands)	DF	February 7, 2001 (age 25)	2023	(Netherlands) Jong PSV	24	1
3	Rubén Bonachera	(Spain)	DF	November 27, 2003 (age 22)	2024	(Poland) Wisła Kraków II	25	0
4	Antonio Gomez	(United States)	DF	December 15, 2001 (age 24)	2024	(United States) Cal Baptist University	26	1
5	Salvatore Mazzaferro	(Canada)	DF	October 11, 2001 (age 24)	2023	(United States) South Florida	26	2
14	Nico Van Rijn	(Spain)	DF	March 26, 2001 (age 25)	2024	(Spain) Recreativo Granada	11	0
25	Anthony De Anda	(United States)	DF	May 5, 2005 (age 21)	2023	(United States) Austin FC Academy	21	0
33	Gavin Wolff	(United States)	DF	August 27, 2008 (age 17)	2024	(United States) Austin FC Academy	1	0
34	Drake Fournier	(United States)	DF	(age 17)	2024	(United States) Austin FC Academy	1	0
35	Mason Miller	(United States)	DF	(age 16)	2024	(United States) Austin FC Academy	1	0
Midfielders
6	Alonso Ramírez	(Mexico)	MF	August 20, 2001 (age 24)	2023	(Mexico) Atlas F.C.	25	3
8	Steeve Louis Jean	(Haiti)	MF	September 6, 2004 (age 21)	2023	(United States) Leg A-Z Soccer	22	1
17	Bryan Arellano	(United States)	MF	June 6, 2005 (age 21)	2023	(United States) Austin FC Academy	22	1
18	Bobosi Byaruhanga	(Uganda)	MF	December 3, 2001 (age 24)	2023	(Czech Republic) MFK Vyškov	25	3
19	CJ Fodrey	(United States)	MF	February 10, 2004 (age 22)	2023	(United States) Austin FC	20	9
30	Ervin Torres	(United States)	MF	November 14, 2007 (age 18)	2023	(United States) Austin FC Academy	25	4
32	Micah Burton	(United States)	MF	March 26, 2006 (age 20)	2023	(United States) Austin FC Academy	28	6
36	Luka Spadafore	(United States)	MF	(age 16)	2024	(United States) Austin FC Academy	2	0
77	Diego Abarca	(United States)	MF	June 19, 2005 (age 20)	2024	(United States) El Paso Locomotive FC	15	1
Forward
7	Anthony García	(Mexico)	FW	July 8, 2003 (age 22)	2024	(Mexico) Santos Laguna Under-23	7	1
9	Sébastien Pineau	(Peru)	FW	January 20, 2003 (age 23)	2023	(Peru) Alianza Lima	21	7
10	Jimmy Farkarlun	(Liberia)	FW	July 14, 2001 (age 24)	2024	(United States) UTRGV	26	4
11	Christopher Garcia	(United States)	FW	January 13, 2003 (age 23)	2024	(United States) El Paso Locomotive FC	9	0
37	Joah Reyna	(United States)	FW	July 26, 2007 (age 18)	2023	(United States) Austin FC Academy	0	0
90	Peter Grogan	(Republic of Ireland)	FW	January 25, 2005 (age 21)	2024	(Republic of Ireland) Bray Wanderers	3	0
	Jonathan Santillan	(United States)	FW	September 9, 2004 (age 21)	2023	(United States) Queensboro FC	5	0

== Transfers ==
=== In ===
Date	Position	No.	Name	From	Fee	Ref.
January 1, 2024	MF	6	(Mexico) Alonso Ramírez	(Mexico) Atlas F.C.	Free	
January 11, 2024	GK	1	(Denmark) Markus Alstrup	(Denmark) B93	Free	
January 19, 2024	MF	30	(United States) Ervin Torres	(United States) Austin FC Academy	Free	
January 31, 2024	GK	20	(United States) Aaron Cervantes	(United States) LA Galaxy II	Free	
January 31, 2024	FW	7	(Mexico) Anthony García	(Mexico) Santos Laguna Under-23	Free	
February 20, 2024	FW	10	(Liberia) Bryant "Jimmy" Faralun	(United States) UTRGV	MLS Super Draft	
February 20, 2024	DF	4	(United States) Antonio Gomez	(United States) Cal Baptist University	Free	
February 20, 2024	DF	3	(Spain) Rubén Bonachera	(Poland) Wisła Kraków II	Free	
March 14, 2024	DF	34	(United States) Drake Fournier	(United States) Austin FC Academy	Amateur Agreement	
March 14, 2024	DF	35	(United States) Mason Miller	(United States) Austin FC Academy	Amateur Agreement	
March 14, 2024	DF	33	(United States) Gavin Wolff	(United States) Austin FC Academy	Amateur Agreement	
March 14, 2024	MF	36	(United States) Luka Spadafora	(United States) Austin FC Academy	Amateur Agreement	
March 14, 2024	FW	37	(United States) Joah Reyna	(United States) Austin FC Academy	Amateur Agreement	
March 14, 2024	GK	31	(United States) Spencer Sanderson	(United States) Austin FC Academy	Amateur Agreement	
June 20, 2024	MF	77	(United States) Diego Abarca	(United States) El Paso Locomotive FC	Free Agent	
July 17, 2024	DF	14	(Spain) Nico Van Rijn	(Spain) Recreativo Granada	Free Agent	
August 4, 2024	FW		(Republic of Ireland) Peter Grogan	(Republic of Ireland) Bray Wanderers	Free Agent	

=== Loan In ===
No.	Pos.	Player	Loaned from	Start	End	Source
11	FW	(United States) Christopher Garcia	(United States) El Paso Locomotive	January 11, 2024	December 31, 2024	
18	MF	(Uganda) Bobosi Byaruhanga	(Czech Republic) MFK Vyškov	February 27, 2024	December 31, 2024	
19	MF	(United States) CJ Fodrey	(United States) Austin FC	March 14, 2024	December 31, 2024	
32	MF	(United States) Micah Burton	(United States) Austin FC	March 14, 2024	December 31, 2024	
26	WG	(Liberia) Jimmy Farkarlun	(United States) Austin FC	June 29, 2024	December 31, 2024	

=== Out ===
Date	Position	No.	Name	To	Type	Fee	Ref.
December 31, 2023	FW	10	(Mexico) David Rodríguez	(Mexico) Atlético San Luis U-20	Loan expired	N/A	
December 31, 2023	MF	18	(Uganda) Bobosi Byaruhanga	(Czech Republic) MFK Vyskov	Loan expired	N/A	
December 31, 2023	FW	11	(United States) EJ Johnson	(Scotland) Hibernian F.C.	Loan expired	N/A	
December 31, 2023	MF	31	(United States) Leo Torres		Declined option	N/A	
December 31, 2023	DF	77	(United States) Chris Pinkham		Declined option	N/A	
January 10, 2024	FW	7	(United States) Micah Burton	(United States) Austin FC	Transfer	N/A	
February 13, 2024	DF	22	(United States) Joe Hafferty	(United States) Las Vegas Lights FC	Option Declined	N/A	
March 8, 2024	MF	21	(France) Valentin Noël	(United States) Las Vegas Lights FC	Transfer	Undisclosed	
June 29, 2024	WG	10	(Liberia) Jimmy Farkarlun	(United States) Austin FC	Transfer	Free	

=== Loan out ===
No.	Pos.	Player	Loaned to	Start	End	Source
21	MF	(France) Valentin Noël	(United States) Austin FC	March 2, 2024	March 5, 2024	
4	DF	(United States) Antonio Gomez	(United States) Austin FC	March 2, 2024; March 8, 2024	March 5, 2024; March 11, 2024	
5	DF	(Canada) Salvatore Mazzaferro	(United States) Austin FC	March 2, 2024	March 5, 2024	
10	WG	(Liberia) Jimmy Farkarlun	(United States) Austin FC	March 8, 2024; March 15, 2024	March 11, 2024; March 18, 2024	

== Non-competitive fixtures ==
=== Preseason ===
February 10	Austin FC II	1–1	Houston Christian University	Austin, Texas
	Garcia		Goal	Stadium: St. David's Performance Center

February 17	Austin FC II	v	St. Edward's University	Austin, Texas
				Stadium: St. David's Performance Center

February 21	Austin FC II	v	New York City FC II	Austin, Texas
				Stadium: St. David's Performance Center

February 26	Austin FC II	1–2	North Texas SC	Austin, Texas
	75'	Report	Garcia 65'; Lacy 88'	Stadium: St. David's Performance Center

March 2	San Antonio FC	2–1	Austin FC II	San Antonio, Texas
	Silva; Agudelo	Report	(pen.)	Stadium: Toyota Field

March 9	Austin FC II	v	Richland College	Austin, Texas
				Stadium: St. David's Performance Center

=== Mid-season ===
July 27 MLS Next Pro Invitational	Austin FC II	2–1	Cancún F.C.	Austin, Texas
8:00pm CDT	Burton 8'; Ramírez 59'		Pérez 67'	Stadium: Parmer Field; Referee: William Hale

== Competitive fixtures ==
Competition	First match	Last match	Starting round	Final position	Record							
Competition	First match	Last match	Starting round	Final position	Pld	W	D	L	GF	GA	GD	Win %
MLS Next Pro season	March 15, 2024	October 6, 2024	Matchday 1	12th Western Conf.	29	7	11	11	44	49	−5	24.14
U.S.Open Cup	March 19, 2024	March 19, 2024	First Round	First Round	1	0	1	0	2	2	+0	0.00
Total					30	7	12	11	46	51	−5	23.33

Last updated: October 6, 2024
Source: Soccerway

=== MLS Next Pro Regular Season ===
==== Standings ====
===== Western Conference =====
Pos	Div	Team	Pld	W	SOW	SOL	L	GF	GA	GD	Pts
10	FR	Sporting Kansas City II	28	10	2	4	12	53	57	−4	38
11	PC	Portland Timbers 2	28	8	4	6	10	43	45	−2	38
12	FR	Austin FC II	28	7	4	7	10	44	49	−5	36
13	FR	Minnesota United FC 2	28	8	4	0	16	43	73	−30	32
14	FR	Colorado Rapids 2	28	6	1	3	18	37	54	−17	23

Source: MLSNP Western Conference
Rules for classification: 1) points; 2) total wins; 3) total goal differential; 4) total goals scored; 5) fewer disciplinary points; 6) away goal differential; 7) away goals scored; 8) home goals differential; 9) home goals scored; 10) coin toss (2 clubs tied) or drawing of lots (≥3 clubs tied)

===== Overall =====
Pos	Team	Pld	W	SOW	SOL	L	GF	GA	GD	Pts
22	Portland Timbers 2	28	8	4	6	10	43	45	−2	38
23	Toronto FC II	28	10	1	5	12	44	51	−7	37
24	Austin FC II	28	7	4	7	10	44	49	−5	36
25	Minnesota United FC 2	28	8	4	0	16	43	73	−30	32
26	Atlanta United 2	28	7	4	3	14	42	64	−22	32

Source: MLSNP
Rules for classification: 1) points; 2) total wins; 3) total goal differential; 4) total goals scored; 5) fewer disciplinary points; 6) away goal differential; 7) away goals scored; 8) home goals differential; 9) home goals scored; 10) coin toss (2 clubs tied) or drawing of lots (≥3 clubs tied)

==== Matches ====
Win	SOW	SOL	Loss

Matchday	Date	Opponent	Venue	Location	Result (Note: Austin FC II's score written first)	Scorers	Attendance	Referee	Position
1	March 15	Tacoma Defiance	Parmer Field	Austin, Texas	1–3	Bryan Arellano 83'		Melvin Rivas	14th West Conf.
2	March 28	Houston Dynamo 2	AVEVA Stadium	Houston, Texas	1–0	CJ Fodrey 80'		Brandon Stevis	9th West Conf.
3	April 12	St. Louis City 2	Parmer Field	Austin, Texas	0–1			Elton Garcia	12th West Conf.
4	April 20	The Town FC	PayPal Park	San Jose, California	0–0 (2–4 p)			Corbyn May	12th West Conf.
5	April 26	Ventura County FC	Parmer Field	Austin, Texas	2–2 (4–5 p)	Sébastien Pineau 17', 37'		Elijio Arreguin	10th West Conf.
6	May 3	Colorado Rapids 2	CIBER Field	Denver, CO	2–1	Byaruhanga 18'; Torres 71'		Benjamin Meyer	9th West Conf.
7	May 12	St. Louis City 2	Citypark	St. Louis, Missouri	2–1	Sébastien Pineau 86'		Nabil Bensalah	10th West Conf.
8	May 17	Sporting Kansas City II	Parmer Field	Austin, Texas	2–2 (5–4 p)	Farkarlun 33'; Ramírez 88'		Sergii Demianchuk	10th West Conf.
9	May 24	Los Angeles FC 2	Parmer Field	Austin, Texas	1–2	Farkarlun 82'		John Matto	10th West Conf.
10	June 2	Real Monarchs	Zions Bank Stadium	Herriman, Utah	0–4			Kelsey Harms	12th West Conf.
11	June 7	Colorado Rapids 2	Parmer Field	Austin, Texas	1–1 (3–5 p)	Fodrey 17'		Mark Verso	12th West Conf.
12	June 14	Portland Timbers 2	Parmer Field	Austin, Texas	0–0 (5–4 p)			Kyle Cividanes	11th West Conf.
13	June 22	North Texas SC	Choctaw Stadium	Arlington, Texas	3–3 (3–5 p)	Pineau 13'; Gomez 37'	1,658	Benjamin Meyer	11th West Conf.
14	June 30	Sporting Kansas City II	Rock Chalk Park	Lawrence, Kansas	2–2 (3–5 p)	Own goal Touré 90+2'		Alexandra Billeter	10th West Conf.
15	July 5	Real Monarchs	Parmer Field	Austin, Texas	2–0	Fodrey 61' (p); Ramírez 81'		Shawn Tehini	10th West Conf.
16	July 11	Houston Dynamo 2	AVEVA Stadium	Houston, Texas	0–2			Trevor Wiseman	11th West Conf.
17	July 18	Minnesota United FC 2	National Sports Center Stadium	Blaine, Minnesota	2–2 (2–3 p)	Farkarlun 16'; Byaruhanga 46'		Alex Beehler	10th West Conf.
18	August 2	North Texas SC	Parmer Field	Austin, Texas	1–1 (5–4 p)	Torres 10'		Melvin Rivas	11th West Conf.
19	August 8	Portland Timbers 2	Providence Park	Portland, Oregon	3–3 (7–8 p)	Burton 2', 10'; Fodrey 59'		Servando Berna	12th West Conf.
20	August 18	Sporting Kansas City II	Rock Chalk Park	Lawrence, Kansas	2–0	Fodrey 50'; Torres 74'		John Matto	12th West Conf.
21	August 23	Colorado Rapids 2	Parmer Field	Austin, Texas	4–3	Fodrey 24', 32'; Pineau 90', 90+3		Corbyn May	11th West Conf.
22	August 28	Minnesota United FC 2	Parmer Field	Austin, Texas	2–1	Fodrey 7'; Mazzaferro 56'		Alejo Calume	10th West Conf.
23	September 2	St. Louis City 2	Citypark	St. Louis, Missouri	2–3	Burton 5'; Abarca 27'		Drew Klemp	11th West Conf.
24	September 8	Minnesota United FC 2	National Sports Center Stadium	Blaine, Minnesota	2–3	Garcia 33'; Farkarlun 88' (p)		Stearne Briem	11th West Conf.
25	September 13	Houston Dynamo 2	Parmer Field	Austin, Texas	3–1	Burton 5', 63'; Alonso Ramírez 57' (p)		William Hale	9th West Conf.
26	September 22	North Texas SC	Choctaw Stadium	Arlington, Texas	1–2	Byaruhanga 83'	1,228	JC Griggs	11th West Conf.
27	September 27	Whitecaps FC 2	Parmer Field	Austin, Texas	1–1 (5–4 p)	Fodrey 44'		Melinda Homa	9th Western Conf.
28	October 6	The Town FC	Parmer Field	Austin, Texas	3–4	Torres 7'; Jean 22'; Burton 29'		Benjamin Meyer	12th Western Conf.

=== U.S. Open Cup ===
Matchday	Date	Opponent	Venue	Location	Result (Note: Austin FC's score written first)	Scorers	Attendance	Referee
First Round	March 19	(Texas) Foro SC (UPSL)	Parmer Field	Austin, Texas	2–2 (3–4 p)	Mazzaferro 53'; Pineau 105'	1,300	William Hale

== Statistics ==
=== Appearances and goals ===
Numbers after plus–sign (+) denote appearances as a substitute.

No.	Pos	Nat	Player	Total		MLSNP		U.S. Open Cup		MLSNP Playoffs	
No.	Pos	Nat	Player	Apps	Goals	Apps	Goals	Apps	Goals	Apps	Goals
1	GK	(Denmark) DEN	Marcus Alstrub	22	0	21+0	0	1+0	0	0+0	0
2	DF	(Netherlands) NED	Cheick Touré	25	1	22+3	1	0+0	0	0+0	0
3	DF	(Spain) ESP	Rubén Bonachera	24	0	22+2	0	0+0	0	0+0	0
4	DF	(United States) USA	Antonio Gomez	24	1	22+2	1	0+0	0	0+0	0
5	DF	(Canada) CAN	Salvatore Mazzaferro	27	2	26+0	1	1+0	1	0+0	0
6	MF	(Mexico) MEX	Alonso Ramírez	26	2	23+2	2	1+0	0	0+0	0
7	MF	(Mexico) MEX	Anthony Garcia	7	1	3+4	1	0+0	0	0+0	0
8	MF	(Haiti) HAI	Steeve Louis Jean	22	2	13+8	2	1+0	0	0+0	0
9	FW	(Peru) PER	Sébastien Pineau	21	7	13+7	6	0+1	1	0+0	0
10	FW	(Liberia) LBR	Jimmy Farkarlun	26	4	24+1	4	1+0	0	0+0	0
11	FW	(United States) USA	Christopher Garcia	8	0	0+7	0	0+1	0	0+0	0
14	DF	(Spain) ESP	Nico Van Rijn	11	0	10+1	0	0+0	0	0+0	0
17	MF	(United States) USA	Bryan Arellano	20	0	4+15	0	1+0	0	0+0	0
18	MF	(Uganda) UGA	Bobosi Byaruhanga	27	2	24+3	2	0+0	0	0+0	0
19	MF	(United States) USA	CJ Fodrey	18	9	15+2	9	1+0	0	0+0	0
20	GK	(United States) USA	Aaron Cervantes	7	0	7+0	0	0+0	0	0+0	0
25	DF	(United States) USA	Anthony De Anda	22	0	8+13	0	1+0	0	0+0	0
30	MF	(United States) USA	Ervin Torres	26	4	24+1	4	0+1	0	0+0	0
31	GK	(United States) USA	Spencer Sanderson	0	0	0+0	0	0+0	0	0+0	0
32	FW	(United States) USA	Micah Burton	28	6	25+2	6	1+0	0	0+0	0
33	DF	(United States) USA	Gavin Wolff	1	0	1+0	0	0+0	0	0+0	0
34	DF	(United States) USA	Drake Fornier	1	0	0+0	0	0+1	0	0+0	0
35	DF	(United States) USA	Mason Miller	1	0	0+0	0	1+0	0	0+0	0
36	MF	(United States) USA	Luka Spadafore	2	0	0+2	0	0+0	0	0+0	0
27	FW	(United States) USA	Joah Reyna	0	0	0+0	0	0+0	0	0+0	0
77	MF	(United States) USA	Diego Abarca	16	2	4+12	2	0+0	0	0+0	0
90	FW	(Republic of Ireland) IRL	Peter Grogan	4	0	0+4	0	0+0	0	0+0	0
	FW	(United States) USA	Jonathan Santillan	6	0	1+4	0	1+0	0	0+0	0

- Last updated: October 6, 2024
- Source: https://www.mlsnextpro.com/stats/players/#season=2024&competition=mls-next-pro&club=20220&statType=general&position=all

=== Top scorers ===
Rank	Position	Number	Name	MLSNP	U.S. Open Cup	MLSNP Playoffs	Total
1	MF	19	(United States) CJ Fodrey	9	0	0	9
2	FW	9	(Peru) Sébastien Pineau	6	1	0	7
3	MF	32	(United States) Micah Burton	6	0	0	6
4	FW	10	(Liberia) Jimmy Farkarlun	4	0	0	4
4	MF	30	(United States) Ervin Torres	4	0	0	4
6	MF	6	(Mexico) Alonso Ramírez	3	0	0	3
6	MF	18	(Uganda) Bobosi Byaruhanga	3	0	0	3
8	DF	5	(Canada) Salvatore Mazzaferro	1	1	0	2
8	MF	77	(United States) Diego Abarca	2	0	0	2
10	DF	2	(Netherlands) Cheick Touré	1	0	0	1
10	DF	3	(United States) Antonio Gomez	1	0	0	1
10	MF	7	(Mexico) Anthony Garcia	1	0	0	1
10	MF	8	(Haiti) Steeve Louis Jean	1	0	0	1
10	MF	17	(United States) Bryan Arellano	1	0	0	1
Total				44	2	0	46

- Last updated: October 6, 2024
- Source: https://www.mlsnextpro.com/stats/players/#season=2024&competition=mls-next-pro&club=20220&statType=general&position=all

=== Top assists ===
Rank	Position	Number	Name	MLSNP	U.S. Open Cup	MLSNP Playoffs	Total
1	FW	10	(Liberia) Jimmy Farkarlun	9	0	0	9
2	DF	3	(Spain) Rubén Bonachera	6	0	0	6
3	MF	19	(United States) CJ Fodrey	4	0	0	4
3	DF	2	(Netherlands) Cheick Touré	4	0	0	4
5	DF	4	(United States) Antonio Gomez	2	0	0	2
5	MF	30	(United States) Ervin Torres	2	0	0	2
5	MF	32	(United States) Micah Burton	1	1	0	2
8	MF	6	(Mexico) Alonso Ramírez	1	0	0	1
8	MF	8	(Haiti) Steeve Louis Jean	1	0	0	1
8	FW	9	(Peru) Sébastien Pineau	1	0	0	1
8	DF	14	(Netherlands) Nico Van Rijn	1	0	0	1
8	MF	17	(United States) Bryan Arellano	1	0	0	1
8	MF	77	(United States) Diego Abarca	1	0	0	1
Total				34	1	0	35

- Last updated: October 6, 2024
- Source: https://www.mlsnextpro.com/stats/players/#season=2024&competition=mls-next-pro&club=20220&statType=general&position=all

=== Disciplinary record ===
No.	Pos.	Player	MLSNP			U.S. Open Cup			MLSNP Playoffs			Total		
No.	Pos.	Player	Booked	(yellow card) (yellow-red card)	Sent off (straight red)	Booked	(yellow card) (yellow-red card)	Sent off (straight red)	Booked	(yellow card) (yellow-red card)	Sent off (straight red)	Booked	(yellow card) (yellow-red card)	Sent off (straight red)
1	GK	(Denmark) Marcus Alstrup	0	0	0	0	0	0	0	0	0	0	0	0
2	DF	(Netherlands) Cheick Touré	4	0	0	0	0	0	0	0	0	4	0	0
3	DF	(Spain) Rubén Bonachera	3	1	0	0	0	0	0	0	0	3	1	0
4	DF	(United States) Antonio Gomez	4	0	0	0	0	0	0	0	0	4	0	0
5	DF	(Canada) Salvatore Mazzaferro	4	1	0	0	0	0	0	0	0	4	1	0
6	MF	(Mexico) Alonso Ramírez	11	0	0	1	0	0	0	0	0	12	0	0
7	MF	(Mexico) Anthony Garcia	0	0	0	0	0	0	0	0	0	0	0	0
8	MF	(Haiti) Steeve Louis Jean	5	0	0	0	0	0	0	0	0	5	0	0
9	FW	(Peru) Sébastien Pineau	5	1	0	0	0	0	0	0	0	5	1	0
10	FW	(Liberia) Jimmy Farkarlun	2	0	0	0	0	0	0	0	0	2	0	0
11	FW	(United States) Christopher Garcia	0	0	0	0	0	0	0	0	0	0	0	0
14	DF	(Spain) Nico Van Rijn	3	0	0	0	0	0	0	0	0	3	0	0
17	MF	(United States) Bryan Arellano	1	0	0	0	0	0	0	0	0	1	0	0
18	MF	(Uganda) Bobosi Byaruhanga	3	1	0	0	0	0	0	0	0	3	1	0
19	MF	(United States) CJ Fodrey	3	0	0	1	0	0	0	0	0	4	0	0
20	GK	(United States) Aaron Cervantes	0	0	0	0	0	0	0	0	0	0	0	0
25	DF	(United States) Anthony De Anda	8	0	1	0	0	0	0	0	0	8	0	1
30	MF	(United States) Ervin Torres	2	0	0	0	0	0	0	0	0	2	0	0
31	GK	(United States) Spencer Sanderson	0	0	0	0	0	0	0	0	0	0	0	0
32	MF	(United States) Micah Burton	2	0	0	0	0	0	0	0	0	2	0	0
33	DF	(United States) Gavin Wolff	0	0	0	0	0	0	0	0	0	0	0	0
34	DF	(United States) Drake Fornier	0	0	0	0	0	0	0	0	0	0	0	0
35	DF	(United States) Mason Miller	0	0	0	0	0	0	0	0	0	0	0	0
36	MF	(United States) Luka Spadafore	1	0	0	0	0	0	0	0	0	1	0	0
37	FW	(United States) Joah Reyna	0	0	0	0	0	0	0	0	0	0	0	0
77	MF	(United States) Diego Abarca	1	1	0	0	0	0	0	0	0	1	1	0
	FW	(United States) Jonathan Santillan	1	0	0	0	0	0	0	0	0	1	0	0
	FW	(Republic of Ireland) Peter Grogan	0	0	0	0	0	0	0	0	0	0	0	0
Total			63	5	1	2	0	0	0	0	0	65	5	1

- Last updated: October 6, 2024
- Source: https://www.mlsnextpro.com/stats/players/#season=2024&competition=mls-next-pro&club=20220&statType=general&position=all

=== Clean sheets ===
Rank	Number	Name	MLSNP	U.S. Open Cup	MLSNP Playoffs	Total
1	1	(Denmark) Marcus Alstrup	5	0	0	5

- Last updated: October 6, 2024
- Source: https://www.mlsnextpro.com/stats/players/#season=2024&competition=mls-next-pro&club=20220&statType=general&position=all

== Awards and honors ==
=== MLS Goal of the Week ===
Week	Player	Opponent	Ref
3	(United States) CJ Fodrey	Houston Dynamo 2	
25	(United States) Diego Abarca	St. Louis City 2	
