= Ervin Torres =

American soccer player (born 2007)

Personal information
- Date of birth: November 14, 2007 (age 18)
- Place of birth: Laredo, Texas
- Height: 1.78 m (5 ft 10 in)
- Position: Midfielder

Team information
- Current team: Austin FC
- Number: 38

Youth career
- 2020–2023: Austin FC Academy

Senior career*
Years	Team	Apps	(Gls)
2023–2025	Austin FC II	53	(8)
2024–2025	→ Austin FC (loan)	2	(0)
2026–	→ Austin FC II (loan)	6	(2)
2026–	Austin FC	20	(2)

International career^{‡}
2022–2024	United States U16	7	(1)
2025–	United States U18	2	(1)
2024–	United States U19	6	(0)
- * Club domestic league appearances and goals as of 21:32, November 8, 2026 (UTC) ‡ National team caps and goals as of 01:02, August 21, 2026 (UTC)

Ervin Torres (born November 14, 2007) is an American professional soccer player who plays as a midfielder for Major League Soccer club Austin FC.

== Early career ==
Torres was a member of Austin Academy from 2022 at the U-14 level. In 2023, Torres' performance earned him an appearance at the MLS Next All-Star game.

== Club career ==
=== Austin FC II ===
In 2023, Torres was signed to an amateur agreement for the 2023 Austin FC II season. Torres made 3 appearances during his first season with the club. Prior to the 2024 season, Austin FC II signed Torres to his first professional contract with the club. Torres made 50 appearances and had 8 goals during the 2024 and 2025 seasons.

=== Austin FC ===
In October 2024, Torres was brought up on a short–term loan with the first team, earning Torres his first MLS appearance. Prior to the 2026 season, Torres was signed to a homegrown contract with the first team.

== International career ==
Torres earned his first U.S. Youth call up for the U-15 training camp in 2022. Later that year Torres was called up to the Mexican U–15 team training camp. After his call up to the Mexican U–15 training camp, the U.S. called Torres up for U-16 team. Torres continued receiving call ups with the U.S. U–17, U-18, and U-19 teams.

== Career statistics ==
=== Club statistics ===
As of matched played November 7, 2026

Appearances and goals by club, season and competition
Club	League	Season	League		League Cup		National cup (Note: Includes U.S. Open Cup)		Other		Total	
Club	League	Season	Apps	Goals	Apps	Goals	Apps	Goals	Apps	Goals	Apps	Goals
Austin FC II (loan)	2023	MLS Next Pro	3	0	0	0	–		–		3	0
Austin FC II	2024	MLS Next Pro	24	4	–		1	0	–		25	4
Austin FC II	2025	MLS Next Pro	26	4	–		–		–		26	4
Austin FC II (loan)	2026	MLS Next Pro	6	2	–		–		–		6	2
Austin FC (loan)	2024	Major League Soccer	1	0	–		–		0	0	1	0
Austin FC (loan)	2025	Major League Soccer	1	0	0	0	0	0	–		1	0
Austin FC	2026	Major League Soccer	20	2	–		0	0	4 (Note: Includes appearances in Leagues Cup)	0	24	2
Career total			81	12	0	0	1	0	4	0	86	12

=== International statistics ===
As of match played October 15, 2024

Year	Apps	Goals
United States USMYNT U-16
2022	7	1
United States MYNT U-18
2025	1	0
United States MYNT U-19
2024	2	0
Total	10	1

== Honors ==
Austin FC II

- MLS Next Pro: Champions – 2023
- MLS Next Pro: Regular Season Champions – 2026 MLS Next Pro season
