= Salvatore Mazzaferro =

Canadian soccer player (born 2001)

Personal information
- Date of birth: October 11, 2001 (age 25)
- Place of birth: Toronto, Ontario, Canada
- Height: 6 ft 1 in (1.85 m)
- Position: Defender

Team information
- Current team: Loudoun United
- Number: 5

Youth career
- Bolton SC
- FC London
- Brampton SC
- Atletico Toronto
- 2017–2019: Toronto FC

College career
Years	Team	Apps	(Gls)
2019–2022	South Florida Bulls	59	(1)

Senior career*
Years	Team	Apps	(Gls)
2018	Toronto FC III	8	(0)
2022	Tormenta FC 2	8	(0)
2023–2024	Austin FC II	53	(4)
2024	→ Austin FC (loan)	0	(0)
2025	Atlanta United 2	27	(3)
2025	→ Atlanta United (loan)	1	(0)
2026–	Loudoun United	21	(0)
- * Club domestic league appearances and goals as of 5 November 2026

Salvatore "Sal" Mazzaferro (born October 11, 2001) is a Canadian professional soccer player who plays as a defender for USL Championship side Loudoun United FC.

== Early life ==
Born in Toronto, Canada, Mazzaferro is of Italian descent through his grandparents. Mazzaferro began playing youth soccer with Bolton SC. After his family moved to London, Ontario, he began playing with FC London, later moving on to play with Brampton SC and Atletico Toronto. He later joined the Toronto FC Academy.

== College career ==
In 2019, he began attending the University of South Florida, where he played for the men's soccer team. On August 29, 2019, he made his collegiate debut in a match against the Maryland Terrapins. At the end of his freshman season, he was named to the American Athletic Conference (AAC) All-Rookie Team and the All-Academic Team. On March 6, 2021, he recorded his first assist, in a match against the Tulsa Golden Hurricane. On March 20, 2021, he scored his first collegiate goal, in a match against the SMU Mustangs. After his sophomore season, he was named to the All-AAC Second Team and was once again named to the All-Academic Team. Ahead of his junior season, he was named to the preseason All-Conference team, and after the season, he was once again named an All-AAC Second Team.

Ahead of his senior season, he was once again named to the preseason All-AAC team and was named the AAC Defensive Player of the Week in October. At the end of the season, he was named to the All-AAC Second Team for the third time, and was also named to the All-East Region Third Team.

== Club career ==
In 2018, he played with Toronto FC III in League1 Ontario.

In 2022, he played with Tormenta FC 2 in USL League Two.

In December 2022, Mazzaferro was selected in the third round (72nd overall) of the 2023 MLS SuperDraft by Austin FC. In March 2023, he signed a professional contract with their second team Austin FC II, in MLS Next Pro. On June 18, 2023, he scored his first goal in a 4-0 victory over Portland Timbers 2. He won the MLS Next Pro title with the club in 2023. After appearing in 27 matches during the 2023 season, Austin FC II exercised the one year option on Mazzaferro's contract for the 2024 season. In March 2024, he signed a short-term loan with the first team.

In January 2025, he signed a contract with Atlanta United 2. In August 2025, he signed a pair of short-term loans with the Atlanta United FC first team. On August 6, 2025, he made his first team debut in a 2025 League Cup match against Mexican side Atlas.

On January 18, 2026, Loudoun United announced they had signed Mazzaferro to a multi-year contract through the 2027 USL Championship season.

== Career statistics ==
As of August 18, 2025

Appearances and goals by club, season and competition
Club	League	Season	League		Playoffs		National cup		Other		Total	
Club	League	Season	Apps	Goals	Apps	Goals	Apps	Goals	Apps	Goals	Apps	Goals
Toronto FC III	2018	League1 Ontario	8	0	–		–		–		8	0
Tormenta FC 2	2022	USL League Two	8	0	–		–		–		8	0
Austin FC II	2023	MLS Next Pro	27	3	4	0	–		–		31	3
Austin FC II	2024	MLS Next Pro	26	1	–		1	1	–		27	2
Austin FC II	Total		53	4	4	0	1	1	–		58	5
Austin FC (loan)	2024	Major League Soccer	0	0	–		–		0	0	0	0
Atlanta United 2	2025	MLS Next Pro	27	3	–		–		–		27	3
Atlanta United FC (loan)	2025	Major League Soccer	1	0	–		–		1	0	2	0
Loudoun United	2026	USL Championship	16	0	0	0	1	0	3	0	20	0
Career total			113	5	4	0	2	1	4	0	123	6

== Honours ==
Austin FC II

- MLS Next Pro: 2023
