= Sebastien Pineau =

Peruvian footballer (born 2003)

Personal information
- Full name: Sebastien Gerard Pineau Flores
- Date of birth: 20 January 2003 (age 23)
- Place of birth: Santiago, Chile
- Height: 1.86 m (6 ft 1 in)
- Position: Forward

Team information
- Current team: Cajamarca
- Number: 7

Youth career
- Alianza Lima

Senior career*
Years	Team	Apps	(Gls)
2021–2022	Alianza Lima	1	(0)
2021	→ César Vallejo (loan)	7	(0)
2023–2024	Austin FC II	45	(14)
2025	Recreativo	3	(0)
2026–	Cajamarca	0	(0)

International career^{‡}
2021–2022	Chile U20	9	(0)
2022–	Peru U20	5	(1)
- * Club domestic league appearances and goals as of 26 January 2026 ‡ National team caps and goals as of 24 January 2023

Sebastien Gerard Pineau Flores (born 20 January 2003) is a professional footballer who plays as a forward for Cajamarca. Born in Chile, he is a youth international for Peru.

== Club career ==
=== Alianza Lima ===
==== Universidad César Vallejo loan ====
Having spent the 2021 season on loan with Universidad César Vallejo, Pineau returned to Alianza Lima for 2022, making his debut in a 2–0 win over Cienciano. With his contract at Alianza ending on 31 October 2022, he was left a free agent, stating that he would wait until after the 2023 South American U-20 Championship had concluded to negotiate a renewal with the club.

=== Austin FC II ===
On 23 February 2023, Austin FC II announced they had signed Pineau to a two-year contract through the 2024 season. Pineau was the starting #9 for Austin FC II when they won the 2023 MLS Next Pro Cup, beating the Columbus Crew 2 by a score of 3–1.

=== Cajamarca ===
Back to Peru, Pineau joined Cajamarca in January 2026.

== International career ==
Born in Santiago, Chile, to a Peruvian mother and French father, Pineau initially opted to represent his nation of birth, Chile, at international level, making his debut in December 2021.

In May 2022, he played in a friendly game for the Chile under-20 team against Uruguay, before being called up to represent both Chile and Peru in August of the same year. After representing Chile U20 at the 2022 South American Games, in November 2022, he switched allegiance to Peru, reportedly due to family influence, stating that he "always wanted to compete".

He was called up to the Peru squad for the 2023 South American U-20 Championship.

== Career statistics ==
=== Club ===
As of 2 September 2024

Appearances and goals by club, season and competition
Club	Season	League			National Cup		Continental		Other		Total	
Club	Season	Division	Apps	Goals	Apps	Goals	Apps	Goals	Apps	Goals	Apps	Goals
Alianza Lima	2021	Peruvian Primera División	0	0	0	0	0	0	–		0	0
Alianza Lima	2022	Peruvian Primera División	1	0	0	0	0	0	–		1	0
Alianza Lima	Total		1	0	0	0	0	0	0	0	1	0
UCV (loan)	2021	Peruvian Primera División	7	0	0	0	–		0	0	7	0
UCV (loan)	Total		7	0	0	0	0	0	0	0	7	0
Austin FC II	2023	MLS Next Pro	25	7	–		–		4 (Note: Appearance(s) in MLSNP Playoffs)	0	29	7
Austin FC II	2024	MLS Next Pro	20	6	1	1	–		–		21	7
Career total			53	13	1	1	0	0	4	0	58	14

== Honors ==
Club

- Austin FC II
  - MLS Next Pro Cup: Champions – 2023
