= Alonso Ramírez (footballer) =

Mexican footballer (born 2001)

Personal information
- Full name: Alonso Ramírez Jiménez
- Date of birth: 20 August 2001 (age 25)
- Place of birth: Chiautempan, Mexico
- Height: 1.73 m (5 ft 8 in)
- Position: Midfielder

Team information
- Current team: Puebla
- Number: 16

Youth career
- 2016–2022: Atlas

Senior career*
Years	Team	Apps	(Gls)
2021–2025	Atlas	5	(0)
2022	→ Mazorqueros (loan)	9	(1)
2023–2024	→ Austin FC II (loan)	54	(7)
2024	→ Austin FC (loan)	2	(0)
2026–	Puebla	25	(0)
- * Club domestic league appearances and goals as of 8 November 2026

Alonso Ramírez Jiménez (born 20 August 2001) is a Mexican professional footballer who plays as a midfielder for Liga MX club Puebla.

== Early career ==
Ramírez was a member of Atlas Academy from 2016 to 2019, becoming a member of the Atlas Under-20 team in 2019, making 38 appearances in the Liga MX Sub-20 competition.

== Club career ==
=== Atlas ===
In 2021, Ramírez was brought up to the first team with Atlas, but only appeared in friendlies.

=== Mazorqueros ===
In 2022, Ramírez was put on loan with Mazorqueros, where he made nine appearances and scored one goal in Liga Premier de México.

=== Austin FC II ===
On 2 March 2023, Ramírez was put on a year-long loan with Austin FC II. Ramirez made 26 appearances during the regular season, scoring two goals and making four more appearances in the playoffs, scoring two more goals, including one in the MLS Next Cup final, which was won by Austin FC II 3–1 over Columbus Crew II. At the end of the loan, Austin FC II signed Ramírez to a one-year agreement.

=== Austin FC ===
On 15 June 2024, Austin FC signed Ramírez to a short-term loan, where he made one appearance with the first team. On 19 June 2024, he was resigned to a second short-term loan, where he made a second appearance with the first team.

=== Return to Atlas ===
On 12 January 2025, Ramírez made his official debut for Atlas, coming on as a substitute against Cruz Azul. He was released in November 2025.

== Career statistics ==
=== Club statistics ===
As of match played on 25 October 2026

Appearances and goals by club, season and competition
Club	Season	League			National cup (Note: Includes Appearance(s) in U.S. Open Cup)		Continental		Other		Total	
Club	Season	Division	Apps	Goals	Apps	Goals	Apps	Goals	Apps	Goals	Apps	Goals
Atlas	2024–25	Liga MX	2	0	—		—		—		2	0
Atlas	2025–26	Liga MX	3	0	—		—		2 (Note: Appearances in Leagues Cup)	0	5	0
Atlas	Total		5	0	—		—		2	0	7	0
Mazorqueros (loan)	2022–23	Serie B	9	1	—		—		—		9	1
Austin FC II (loan)	2023	MLS Next Pro	30	4	—		—		—		30	4
Austin FC II (loan)	2024	MLS Next Pro	24	3	1	0	—		—		25	3
Austin FC II (loan)	Total		54	7	1	0	—		—		55	7
Austin FC (loan)	2024	MLS	2	0	—		—		—		2	0
Puebla	2025–26	Liga MX	15	0	—		—		—		15	0
Puebla	2026–27	Liga MX	9	0	—		—		2	0	11	0
Puebla	Total		24	0	—		—		2	0	26	0
Career total			94	8	1	0	0	0	4	0	99	8
