= Kipp Keller =

American soccer player (born 2000)

Personal information
- Full name: Kipp Christian Keller
- Date of birth: July 14, 2000 (age 26)
- Place of birth: St. Louis, Missouri, US
- Height: 6 ft 1 in (1.85 m)
- Position: Defender

Team information
- Current team: New Mexico United
- Number: 4

Youth career
- –2019: Saint Louis FC

College career
Years	Team	Apps	(Gls)
2019–2021	Saint Louis Billikens	49	(5)

Senior career*
Years	Team	Apps	(Gls)
2019	Saint Louis FC	0	(0)
2021	St. Louis Scott Gallagher	0	(0)
2022–2023	Austin FC	13	(0)
2023	→ Austin FC II (loan)	16	(0)
2024	FC Cincinnati	16	(0)
2024	→ FC Cincinnati 2 (loan)	2	(0)
2025	Minnesota United	0	(0)
2025	→ Minnesota United 2 (loan)	8	(0)
2025	→ New Mexico United (loan)	9	(1)
2026–	New Mexico United	26	(4)
- * Club domestic league appearances and goals as of 09:59, 10 November 2026 (UTC)

Kipp Christian Keller (born July 14, 2000) is an American professional soccer player who plays as a defender for USL Championship side New Mexico United.

== Career ==
=== Youth and college ===
Keller played high school soccer at The Principia in St. Louis, Missouri, where he was named First-team All-State selection, helping to lead them to a state championship his freshman year. Keller also played club soccer with the Saint Louis FC academy, where he helped the U-19 side advance to the USSDA playoffs in 2018. He signed an academy contract with Saint Louis FC in 2019, making a single appearance for the club in the US Open Cup on May 29, 2019, against Forward Madison.

In 2019, Keller attended Saint Louis University to play college soccer. He went on to make 49 appearances for the Billikens, scoring five goals and tallying two assists. He also earned honors such as second-team All-Conference and A-10 All-Rookie team in 2019, second-team All-Conference in 2020, and second-team All-American nod in 2021, as well as Atlantic-10 Conference Defensive Player of the Year. He and the 2021 team advanced to the quarterfinals of the NCAA College Cup.

Keller was part of the USL League Two roster for St. Louis Scott Gallagher during their 2021 season, but didn't appear for the club.

=== Austin FC ===
In January 2022, it was announced that Keller had signed a Generation Adidas contract with Major League Soccer, and would leave college a year early to enter the 2022 MLS SuperDraft. On January 11, 2022, he was selected 5th overall in the SuperDraft by Austin FC. He made his professional debut on February 26, 2022, starting against FC Cincinnati in a 5–0 win. On November 17, 2023, Austin FC announced they would not exercise the 2024 option for Keller. After a poor showing in the first game of the 2023 season Keller was loaned to the Austin FC second team Austin FC II. Keller appeared in 16 games as a center back for Austin FC II during their 2023 MLS Next Pro Cup season.

=== FC Cincinnati ===
In December 2023, Keller signed with FC Cincinnati following the conclusion of his contract with Austin FC, who declined his 2024 option.

=== Minnesota United ===
In December 2024, Keller was selected by Minnesota United FC in Stage 1 of the MLS Re-Entry Draft. He joined the club ahead of the 2025 season, splitting his time between the senior squad and Minnesota United FC 2 in MLS Next Pro. On August 22, 2025, New Mexico United announced the acquisition of Keller for the remainder of the 2025 USL Championship season. On October 11, Keller scored his first professional goal in a 3–3 draw with Orange County SC. On November 26, Minnesota United announced that they had declined Keller's contract option.

=== New Mexico United ===
On January 9, 2026, New Mexico United announced they had signed Keller to a contract for the 2026 USL Championship season.

Following the 2026 season, Keller was named 2026 USL Championship All-League First Team.

== Career statistics ==
=== Club ===
As of match played November 16, 2025

Appearances and goals by club, season and competition
Club	League	Season	League		National cup (Note: Includes U.S. Open Cup)		Continental		Playoffs (Note: Includes MLS Cup playoffs and USL Championship playoffs)		Other		Total	
Club	League	Season	Apps	Goals	Apps	Goals	Apps	Goals	Apps	Goals	Apps	Goals	Apps	Goals
Saint Louis FC	USL	2019	0	0	1	0	—		—		—		1	0
Austin FC	Major League Soccer	2022	6	0	1	0	—		—		—		7	0
Austin FC	Major League Soccer	2023	7	0	—		1 (Note: Appearance(s) in CONCACAF Champions Cup)	0	—		2	0	10	0
Austin FC	Total		13	0	1	0	1	0	0	0	2	0	17	0
Austin FC II (loan)	MLS Next Pro	2023	16	0	—		—		—		—		16	0
FC Cincinnati	Major League Soccer	2024	16	0	—		3	0	—		3 (Note: Appearances in Leagues Cup)	0	21	0
FC Cincinnati 2 (loan)	MLS Next Pro	2024	2	0	—		—		—		—		2	0
Minnesota United	Major League Soccer	2025	0	0	0	0	—		0	0	0	0	0	0
Minnesota United 2 (loan)	MLS Next Pro	2025	8	0	—		—		—		—		8	0
New Mexico United (loan)	USL Championship	2025	9	1	—		—		3	0	—		12	1
Career total			64	1	2	0	4	0	0	0	5	0	77	1

== Honors ==
Austin FC II

- MLS Next Pro: 2023

Individual

- USLC All-League First Team: 2026
