= Cheick Touré =

Dutch footballer (born 2001)

Personal information
- Date of birth: 7 February 2001 (age 25)
- Place of birth: Conakry, Guinea
- Height: 1.67 m (5 ft 6 in)
- Position: Right-back

Team information
- Current team: Katwijk
- Number: 25

Youth career
- OMC
- 2011–2013: Dordrecht
- 2013–2020: Feyenoord

Senior career*
Years	Team	Apps	(Gls)
2017–2018	Feyenoord	1	(0)
2020–2022	Jong PSV	48	(3)
2023–2024	Austin FC II	50	(1)
2026–	Katwijk	8	(0)

International career^{‡}
2019	Netherlands U18	1	(0)
2018	Netherlands U19	2	(1)
- * Club domestic league appearances and goals as of 20:40, 20 October 2026 (UTC) ‡ National team caps and goals as of 20 November 2018

Cheick Touré (born 7 February 2001) is a Dutch footballer who plays as a right-back for Tweede Divisie club Katwijk.

Born in Guinea, he came through the Feyenoord academy and became one of the club's youngest-ever debutants when he made his Eredivisie bow at the age of 16 in 2017. A winger in his youth, he spent two seasons with Jong PSV in the Eerste Divisie before moving to the United States, where he played mainly as a full-back and won the MLS Next Pro title with Austin FC II in 2023. After more than a year without a club, he joined Katwijk in 2026.

== Early life ==
Touré was born in Conakry, Guinea. At the age of five, he left the country with his brother because of an impending civil war and settled in the Netherlands. He began playing football at OMC, an amateur club in Dordrecht, and joined the youth academy of FC Dordrecht at the age of ten, where he was scouted by Feyenoord before moving to the Rotterdam club in 2013.

== Club career ==
=== Feyenoord ===
Touré scored 23 goals and provided eight assists in 73 matches for Feyenoord's youth sides. On 27 August 2017, at the age of 16, he made his Eredivisie debut under Giovanni van Bronckhorst, replacing Steven Berghuis in the 66th minute of a 5–0 home win over Willem II at De Kuip. Only Georginio Wijnaldum, who had been 53 days younger on his debut, had played for the club at a younger age, and when Antoni Milambo later broke the record, Touré dropped to third on the list.

It proved to be his only appearance for the first team. Injuries were among the reasons he never made a lasting breakthrough, and Touré later said he had needed to play at a higher level, which Feyenoord could not offer because it did not have a reserve side in the Eerste Divisie.

=== Jong PSV ===
When his contract at Feyenoord expired in 2020, Touré joined PSV on a free transfer, signing a two-year contract on 19 June. Signed as a left winger, he was assigned to the club's reserve side, Jong PSV, for whom he made 48 Eerste Divisie appearances over two seasons, scoring three goals and providing four assists. After leaving PSV in 2022, he had an unsuccessful trial at Willem II.

=== Austin FC II ===
PSV and Austin FC had announced a partnership in September 2022, and on 5 January 2023 Touré became one of the first three players signed by Austin FC II ahead of its inaugural season in MLS Next Pro, joining as a free agent on a one-year contract with an option for 2024. Austin presented him as a full-back, and Touré later explained that, although he played his matches in the third tier of the American football pyramid, he often trained with the first team because the two squads shared the same facilities. He started at right-back in the 2023 MLS Next Pro Cup final, in which Austin FC II beat Columbus Crew 2 3–1 to win the title in their first season.

He remained on Austin FC II's roster for the 2024 season, but an injury largely brought his time in the United States to an end, and he left the club at the start of 2025, after which he was without a club.

=== Katwijk ===
After a spell training with Tweede Divisie club Katwijk under head coach Luigi Bruins, Touré earned a contract and joined the club on 18 August 2026. Katwijk highlighted his versatility, noting that he had developed from a forward into a defender, and said his arrival was particularly welcome given the number of injuries in the squad.

== International career ==
Touré played two matches for the Netherlands under-19 team, scoring one goal.

== Career statistics ==
As of match played 17 October 2026

Appearances and goals by club, season and competition
Club	Season	League			National Cup		Continental Cup		Other		Total	
Club	Season	Division	Apps	Goals	Apps	Goals	Apps	Goals	Apps	Goals	Apps	Goals
Feyenoord	2017–18	Eredivisie	1	0	0	0	0	0	—		1	0
Jong PSV	2020–21	Eerste Divisie	24	2	0	0	—		—		24	2
Jong PSV	2021–22	Eerste Divisie	24	1	0	0	—		—		24	1
Jong PSV	Total		49	3	—		—		—		49	3
Austin FC II	2023	MLS Next Pro	25	0	—		—		4 (Note: Appearance(s) in MLSNP playoffs)	0	29	0
Austin FC II	2024	MLS Next Pro	25	1	0	0	—		—		25	1
Katwijk	2026–27	Tweede Divisie	8	0	1	0	—		—		9	0
Career total			107	4	1	0	0	0	4	0	112	4

== Honours ==
PSV

- Eredivisie: 2017–18

Austin FC II

- MLS Next Pro Cup: 2023
