= Charlie Asensio =

American soccer player (born 2000)

Personal information
- Full name: Carlos Asensio
- Date of birth: January 18, 2000 (age 26)
- Place of birth: Roswell, Georgia, United States
- Height: 1.75 m (5 ft 9 in)
- Position: Left-back

Team information
- Current team: Orange County SC
- Number: 3

Youth career
- –2014: IMG Academy
- 2014–2016: Georgia United
- 2016–2018: Atlanta United

College career
Years	Team	Apps	(Gls)
2018–2021	Clemson Tigers	82	(0)

Senior career*
Years	Team	Apps	(Gls)
2022–2023	Austin FC	0	(0)
2022	→ Charleston Battery (loan)	15	(0)
2023	→ Austin FC II (loan)	20	(0)
2024–2025	Orange County SC	2	(0)

International career^{‡}
2016–2017	United States U17	6	(0)
2018	United States U19	3	(0)
- * Club domestic league appearances and goals as of November 14, 2024 ‡ National team caps and goals as of July 10, 2022

Carlos "Charlie" Asensio (born January 18, 2000) was an American soccer player who most recently played as a left-back for USL Championship club Orange County SC.

== Career ==
=== Youth ===
Asensio attended Alan C. Pope High School, playing as part of the IMG Academy until 2014, before joining Georgia United who later went on to form the academy club for Atlanta United in 2016. In 2018, Asensio appeared on the bench for Atlanta United 2 during a USL Championship fixture against Indy Eleven, but did not make an appearance.

Before attending college, Asensio played with the United States under-17 and under-19 squads.

=== College ===
In 2018, Asensio went to Clemson University to play college soccer. In four seasons with the Tigers, Asensio made 82 appearances and tallied nine assists. He was named ACC All-Freshman Team in 2018, and Second Team All-ACC in 2019, and helped the Tigers win the NCAA Men's Soccer National Championship in 2021.

=== Austin FC ===
On January 11, 2022, Asensio was drafted 35th overall in the 2022 MLS SuperDraft by Austin FC. He officially signed with Austin on February 23, 2022. On November 17, 2023, Austin FC announced they would not exercise the 2024 option for Asensio.

==== Charleston Battery loan ====
On July 8, 2022, Asensio was loaned to USL Championship side Charleston Battery for the remainder of the season. He made his professional debut the following day, appearing as a 66th–minute substitute during a 3–0 loss to Birmingham Legion.

==== Austin FC II loan ====
At the beginning of the 2023 season it was announced that Asensio was being loaned to Austin FC II for their inaugural season. Asensio was the starting left back for Austin FC II when they won the 2023 MLS Next Pro Cup, beating the Columbus Crew 2 by a score of 3–1.

=== Orange County SC ===
On January 16, 2024, Asensio signed with Orange County SC of the USL Championship.

== Personal ==
Asensio's mother is from Panama.

== Career statistics ==
=== Club ===
As of October 21, 2023

Appearances and goals by club, season and competition
Club	Season	Division	League		National cup		Continental		Other		Total	
Club	Season	Division	Apps	Goals	Apps	Goals	Apps	Goals	Apps	Goals	Apps	Goals
Austin FC	2022	Major League Soccer	0	0	0	0	—		0	0	0	0
Austin FC	2023	Major League Soccer	0	0	0	0	0	0	0	0	0	0
Charleston Battery (loan)	2022	USL Championship	15	0	0	0	—		—		15	0
Austin FC II (loan)	2023	MLS Next Pro	20	0	–		–		3	0	23	0
Austin FC II (loan)	Club Total		35	0	0	0	0	0	4 (Note: Appearance(s) in MLSNP Playoffs)	0	39	0
Career total			35	0	0	0	0	0	4	0	39	0

== Honors ==
Club

- Austin FC II
  - MLS Next Pro Cup: Champions – 2023
