= Damian Las =

American soccer player (born 2002)

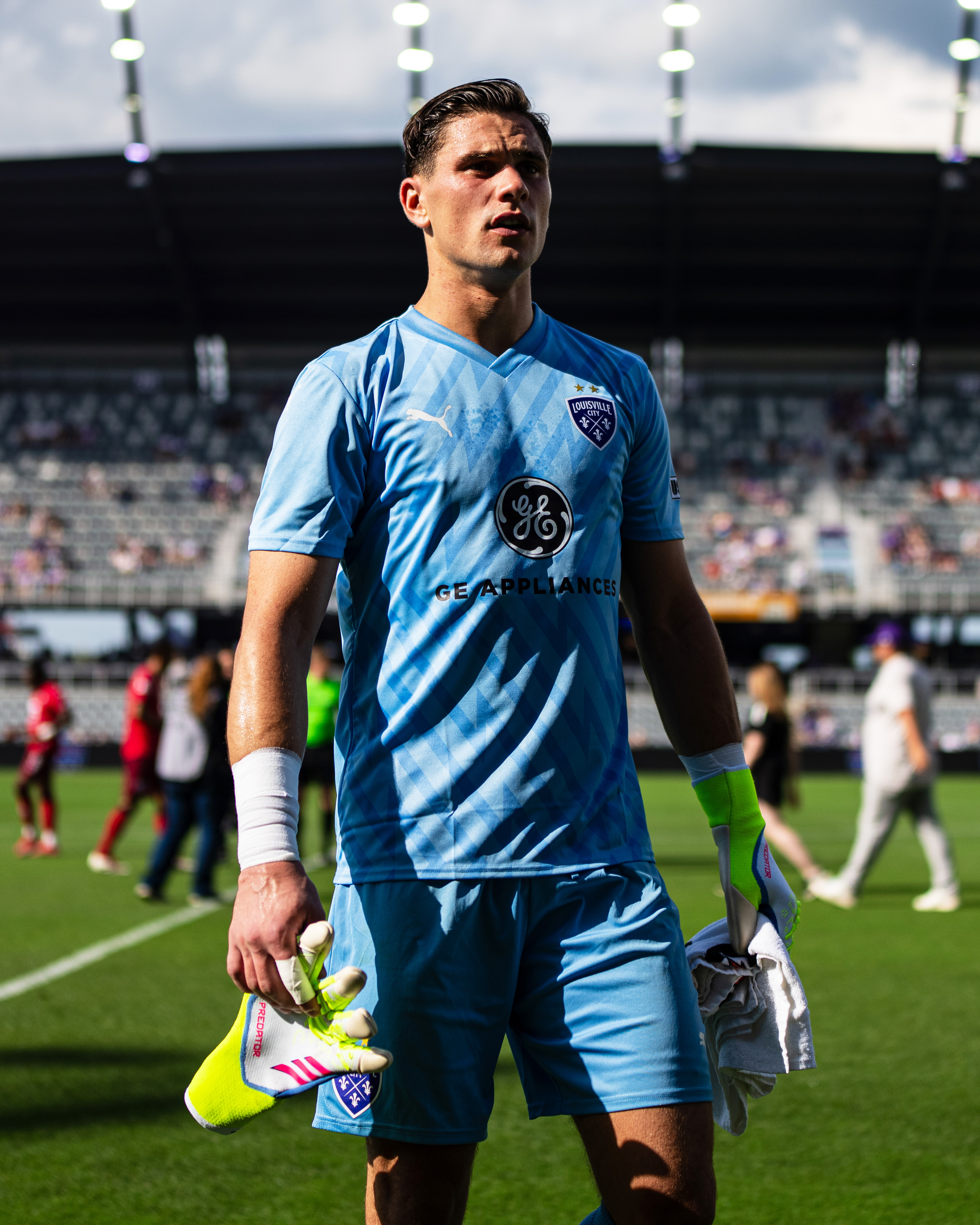
- Las with Louisville City in 2025

Personal information
- Full name: Damian Jan Las
- Date of birth: April 11, 2002 (age 24)
- Place of birth: Des Plaines, Illinois, U.S.
- Height: 6 ft 0 in (1.83 m)
- Position: Goalkeeper

Team information
- Current team: Austin FC
- Number: 12

Youth career
- 2012–2016: Chicago Magic SC
- 2016–2019: Chicago Fire
- 2019–2021: Fulham

Senior career*
Years	Team	Apps	(Gls)
2021–2022	Fulham	0	(0)
2021	→ North Carolina FC (loan)	2	(0)
2021	→ Harrow Borough (loan)	7	(0)
2022–	Austin FC	5	(0)
2023	→ Austin FC II (loan)	27	(0)
2024–2025	→ Louisville City (loan)	57	(0)
2026–	→ Austin FC II (loan)	0	(0)

International career
2017	United States U15	5	(0)
2017–2019	United States U17	18	(0)
- * Club domestic league appearances and goals as of 20:12, November 1, 2026 (UTC)

Damian Jan Las (born April 11, 2002) is an American professional soccer player who plays as a goalkeeper for Austin FC in Major League Soccer.

== Club career ==
=== Fulham ===
On September 11, 2019, it was announced that Las would join Fulham from the academy of MLS team Chicago Fire FC.

==== Loan to North Carolina FC ====
On April 21, 2021, Las joined USL League One side North Carolina FC on loan ahead of their 2021 season. He made his debut on June 5, 2021, in a 2–1 loss vs. Fort Lauderdale CF. His first clean sheet came in a goalless draw vs. Tormenta FC on July 3, 2021. In August, his loan ended and he returned to Fulham.

==== Loan to Harrow Borough FC ====
In August 2021, Las joined Southern Football League side Harrow Borough FC on loan. He made his debut on August 14, 2021, in a 2–1 loss vs. Yate Town FC. He made a total of 7 appearances and kept 1 clean sheet whilst losing 4 games and winning 3. He then returned to Fulham in September 2021.

==== Return to Fulham ====
On November 19, 2021, Las made his debut for Fulham's under-23 team in a Premier League 2 match vs. Stoke City. On November 24, Las made his first appearance in a matchday squad for Fulham, but was an unused substitute in a 0–0 draw vs. Derby County.

=== Austin FC ===
On January 25, 2022, Las moved to Major League Soccer side Austin FC, who acquired his homegrown rights from Chicago Fire.

==== Austin FC II ====
During the 2023 season, Las was loaned to the Austin FC II team, where he has started every game of the season. On June 26, 2023, Major League Soccer that they were bringing back goalie wars and Las was one of the four MLSNextPro players selected for the competition. Three days later the MLSNextPro midseason awards were announced and Las was selected as the goalie for the first half of the season. At the end of the 2023 MLS Next Pro regular season, Las was named the Goalkeeper of the Year and to the 2023 MLS Next Pro Best XI. Las was the starting goalkeeper for Austin FC II when they won the 2023 MLS Next Pro Cup, beating the Columbus Crew 2 by a score of 3–1.

==== Louisville City FC ====
On January 29, 2024, Las was loaned to USL Championship club Louisville City for the 2024 USL Championship season. Playing the entire season as the starting keeper for Louisville City, Las was part of the players that earned the Players Shield for 2024. Las joined Louisville in the 2025 pre–season on a second loan from Austin FC. For the second season in a row, Las played in integral role in Louisville finishing atop the table and earning the USL Championship Player's Shield. At the end of the 2025 regular season, Las was named the Golden Glove winner.

== International career ==
Born in the United States, Las is of Polish descent. He played five matches for the United States under-17 team at the 2019 CONCACAF U-17 Championship, and kept three clean sheets in the process.

== Career statistics ==
As of October 31, 2026

Appearances and goals by club, season and competition
Club	League	Season	League		League cup		National cup		Continental		Other		Total	
Club	League	Season	Apps	Goals	Apps	Goals	Apps	Goals	Apps	Goals	Apps	Goals	Apps	Goals
Fulham F.C.	Premier League	2020–21	0	0	0	0	0	0	–		–		0	0
North Carolina FC (loan)	USL League One	2021	2	0	–		0	0	–		–		2	0
Harrow Borough F.C. (loan)	Southern Football League	2021–22	7	0	–		0	0	–		0	0	7	0
Harrow Borough F.C. (loan)	Total		9	0	0	0	0	0	0	0	0	0	9	0
Austin FC	Major League Soccer	2022	0	0	–		0	0	–		0	0	0	0
Austin FC	Major League Soccer	2023	0	0	0	0	0	0	0	0	0	0	0	0
Austin FC	Major League Soccer	2024	0	0	0	0	–		–		0	0	0	0
Austin FC	Major League Soccer	2025	0	0	0	0	0	0	–		–		0	0
Austin FC	Major League Soccer	2026	5	0	0	0	1	0	–		0	0	6	0
Austin FC II (loan)	MLS Next Pro	2023	27	0	4 (Note: Appearance(s) in MLSNP Playoffs)	0	–		–		–		31	0
Austin FC II (loan)	MLS Next Pro	2026	0	0	0	0	–		–		–		0	0
Austin FC II (loan)	Total		32	0	4	0	1	0	0	0	0	0	36	0
Louisville City FC (loan)	USL Championship	2024	32	0	2 (Note: Appearance(s) in USLC Playoffs)	0	0	0	–		–		34	0
Louisville City FC (loan)	USL Championship	2025	25	0	1	0	2	0	–		4 (Note: Appearance(s) in USL Cup)	0	32	0
Louisville City FC (loan)	Total		57	0	3	0	2	0	0	0	4	0	66	0
Career total			98	0	7	0	3	0	0	0	4	0	112	0

== Honors ==
Louisville City FC

- USL Championship: Player's Shield - 2024, 2025

Austin FC II

- MLS Next Pro Cup: Champions – 2023

United States Men's Under-17

- CONCACAF Under-17 Championship: Runners up - 2019

Individual

- MLS Next Pro Goalkeeper of the Year: 2023
- MLS Next Pro Best XI: 2023
- USL Championship First Team All-League: 2025
- USL Championship Golden Glove: 2025
- USL Championship Goalkeeper of the Year: 2025
