= 2023 Austin FC II season =

Austin FC II
2023 season
- Chairman: Anthony Precourt
- Head coach: Brett Uttley
- Stadium: Parmer Field
- MLSNP: Frontier Division: 3rd Western Conference: 4th MLSNP: 8th
- MLS Next Pro playoffs: MLS Next Pro Cup Champions
- Top goalscorer: League: Sébastien Pineau (7); All: Valentin Noël (8)
- Average home league attendance: 0
- Biggest win: ATXII 4–0 POR (6/18); ATXII 4–0 LA (7/30)
- Biggest defeat: HOU 2–0 ATXII 5/27); NTX 3–1 ATXII 9/24
Home colors	Away colors
- All statistics correct as of 02:19, October 23, 2023 (UTC).

The 2023 Austin FC II season was the club's first season in MLS Next Pro, the third tier of soccer in the United States. They played in the league's Western Conference. The club finished the regular season 4th in the Western Conference and 8th overall in the regular season, qualifying for the MLSNP play-offs. In the four play-off games, Austin FC II only allowed one goal on their way to the MLS Next Pro Cup.

Damian Las had a standout season, being selected to both the MLSNP Bext XI and the MLSNP Goalkeeper of the Year. Joe Hafferty was also selected to the MLSNP Bext XI for the 2023 season.

== Background ==
Austin FC started playing in the MLS Western Conference in 2021. In August 2022 it was announced that they would launch a MLS Next Pro team for the 2023 season. On December 13, Austin FC announced that Brett Uttley will be the first coach for Austin FC II.

== Season ==
=== Preseason ===
On January 4, the team announced it had hired its first two assistant coaches, Dennis Sanchez and Jason Grubb. The next day, Austin FC announced the signing of their first three players to the Austin FC II team, Ugandan midfielder Bobosi Byaruhanga, American forward David Rodríguez, and Dutch midfielder Cheick Touré. Both Byaruhanga and Rodríguez are on season long loans with options to buy. Continuing to work on their 2023 team, Austin FC II signed goalkeeper Eric Lopez on January 10, 2022 from LA Galaxy II. On January 23, Austin FC II announced the signing of Anthony De Anda, the first Austin FC Academy player to sign with the team. Continuing to build their inaugural team, Austin FC II announced the signing of Leo Torres and Chris Pinkham on January 24. On January 31, Austin FC II announced signing of Emmanuel Johnson on a year-long loan with option to buy from Hibernian for its inaugural season. After it first couple of preseason games, Austin FC II continued building their roster by signing Christo Vela on loan from Cancún F.C. on February 13. As the first team prepared for the first game of the season, Austin FC II continued to build its squad by signing Sébastien Pineau to a two-year contract through the 2024 season. After acquiring an international slot from New York City FC II for cash consideration on March 1, Austin FC II announced the following day they had signed Alonso Ramírez on a season long loan from Atlas F.C.. On March 3, Austin FC II announced they had signed three of the four Austin FC MLS Super Draft picks. As the opening of the 2023 season approached, Austin FC II announced they had signed two new players, Joe Hafferty and Jonathan Santillan, to the team on March 16. One day prior to their first game of the season, Austin FC II announced they had signed Micah Burton from the academy team. Making final roster adjustments for the MLSNP season, on March 24, 2022 Austin FC II announced that five players from the first team were placed on loans with the team, and another six players were signed to amateur agreements.

=== March/April ===
Austin FC II started their MLSNP season with a 2–1 win over cross-state rivals Houston Dynamo 2 on the back of a two goal performance by Austin FC Superdraft pick Valentin Noël. Austin FC II first ever game on the road resulted in a tie with Sporting Kansas City II, but they dropped a point in their first kick from the marks experience in the MLSNP. Coming back home for their third game of the season, Austin FC II managed another late game winner against Tacoma Defiance, winning 2–1 on an extra-time strike by Christo Vela. Keeping their unbeaten streak alive through the first four games of the season, Austin FC beat North Texas SC 3–0, aided by a brace from Valentin Noël. On the road for their second game of the season and looking to remain unbeaten, Austin FC II faced LA Galaxy II earning a point from the draw, but dropping a point in the shoot-out. Austin FC II finished their first full month of play undefeated with a 1–1 draw against Minnesota United FC 2. But, in their third draw of the season, the team secured their first shootout win edging Minnesota United FC 2 6–5.

=== May/June ===
Austin FC II started the month of May by winning their first ever road game at Providence Park against Portland Timbers 2 in a hardfought 1-0 victory coming off a goal by Rodriguez in the 4th minute of the game. May 14 was the first visit to Colorado for Austin FC II, it was also their first loss as the fell 1–0 to Colorado Rapids 2. Austin FC II, lose both its first home game and their first back-to-back games of the season in a 1–0 lose to the San Jose Earthquakes II. In the second iteration of the Austin/Houston cross state rivalry, Austin FC II loss the game 2–0, bringing the record to 1 win and 1 loss. In their first game in June, Austin FC II returned to their winning ways by beating Real Monarchs 3–0 at Parmar Field. David Rodríguez (footballer, born 2002) scored a brace and Valentin Noël returned to his scoring way, adding the third goal. Coming off a strong win, Austin FC II hosted Whitecaps FC 2, the second place team in the Western Conference. Though the game was hardfought, Austin FC II managed the 1–0 win with a goal off CJ Fodrey. Austin FC II continued to perform well in the month of June, earning their fourth win in a row, defeating Portland Timbers 2, 4–0. After four wins in a row, Austin FC II lost their first game in June to the Tacoma Defiance 1–0. Austin FC II ended the month of June 4–1–1 after drawing with Real Monarchs 0–0, but did earn the extra point in the shootout on two saves by Damian Las.

=== July/August ===
Austin FC II started their summer stretch with a 3–0 win against cross state rivals Houston Dynamo 2 on goals from CJ Fodrey, Sébastien Pineau, and Christo Vela before they headed into a two-week break. After their two week break, Austin FC II had an opportunity to gain some points on the Western Conference leader Colorado Rapids 2. Despite taking an early 3–0 lead on goals from CJ Fodrey, Sébastien Pineau, and Sal Mazzaferro, Colorado Rapids 2 came back in the second half to earn the tie and then gained another point by winning the penalty shoot-out 6–5. A week later Austin FC II had one of their best performances against LA Galaxy II, winning 4–0 on goals from Micah Burton, Alonso Ramírez, Sébastian Pineau, and Leo Torres. A week later, Austin FC II took on Los Angeles FC 2 and played them to a 0–0 draw, earning a point and then secured a second point by winning the penalty shoot-out 4–3. Extending their unbeaten streak to six games, Austin FC II defeated San Jose Earthquakes II 2–0 on a brace by Sébastien Pineau, who scored in the 50th and 89th minutes of the match. Austin FC II added one more game to their unbeaten streak by earning a point in a 1–1 tie against Whitecaps FC 2, but dropped a point is the shootout, falling 4–3.

=== September ===
Austin FC II started the month by qualifying for their first MLS Next Pro playoff berth when they earned two points against Los Angeles FC 2, winning the penalty shoot-out 5–4, after a 1–1 draw in regulation. Joe Hafferty scored his first goal of the season on a corner kick, and Damian Las came up big with several strong saves, including one in the penalty shootout. On the road in Minnesota, Austin FC II was able to add another point to its season total, after a 1–1 draw with MNUFC 2, but were not able to earn the second point after a 13 round penalty shoot-out, losing 8–9 in the shoot-out. On September 22, 2023, the team announced that they had signed two more goalkeepers to the team on amateur contracts. Nicolas Aristizabal came to Austin FC II from the Academy's U-15 team and Greg Monroe joined the team from Sienna College, where he played from 2018 to 2022. Austin FC II fell in a weather interrupted game with North Texas SC 3–1, dropping the team to fourth place in the west going into the play-offs.

=== Play-offs ===
With the new pick your play-off opponent format for this year's MLS Next Pro play-offs, Sporting Kansas City II made a surprise selection and chose Austin FC II for their first round match, which will be played at Rock Chalk Park in Kansas. Austin FC travelled to Rock Chalk Park and secured a 2–0 victory of Sporting Kansas City II on goals from David Rodríguez and Alonso Ramírez, advancing to the Conference semifinals. In the Conference Semi-finals draw, Colorado Rapids choose Earthquakes II, leaving Austin FC II to play Tacoma Defiance in Washington. Austin FC II earned a 1–0 win against Tacoma Defiance in the Western Conference semi-finals on a late goal by Valentin Noël. Austin FC II advances to play Colorado Rapids II in Colorado for the Western Conference finals. Austin FC II and Colorado Rapids 2 played to a 0–0 score after extra time, going to a penalty shoot-out in the Western Conference Finals. Austin FC II went on to win the shootout 4–1 to advance to the MLS Next Pro Cup Finals and move on to face Columbus Crew 2 in Columbus, Ohio for the 2023 MLS Next Cup.

=== MLS Next Pro Cup ===
After winning three away games to secure a spot in the MLS Next Pro Cup Finals, Austin FC II found themselves on the road again, facing Columbus Crew 2 at Lower.com field in the MLS Next Pro Cup. Austin FC II were on their heals in the first half with Columbus Crew 2 getting four shots on goals, all resulting in Damian Las having to make the save. Early in the 2nd half Cheick Touré was whistled for a foul in the box, resulting in a penalty kick. Columbus Crew midfielder Thomas Robert converted the PK to put them up by one goal. Austin FC II continued to push and Valentin Noël earned a penalty kick. Alonso Ramirez converted the PK, tying the game 1–1. Seven minutes later CJ Fodrey and Valentin Noël pushed the ball up the left side, resulting in a goal from the top of the box by Valentin Noël. In the last 10 minutes of the game CJ Fodrey forced an own goal to take a two goal lead and carried that lead through the end of the game. Austin FC II were crowned the 2023 MLS Next Pro Champions.

== Management team ==
Position	Name
Chairman	(United States) Anthony Precourt
Sporting Director	Rodolfo Borrell
Head coach	(United States) Brett Uttley
Assistant coach	(United States) Dennis Sanchez
Assistant coach	(United States) Jason Grubb
Assistant coach	
Goalkeeping coach	
Fitness coach	

== Roster ==
As of October 22, 2023.

No.	Name	Nationality	Position(s)	Date of birth (age)	Signed in	Previous club	Apps	Goals
Goalkeepers
12	Damian Las	(United States)	Goalkeeper	April 11, 2002 (age 24)	2023	(United States) Austin FC	31	0
30	Spencer Sanderson	(United States)	Goalkeeper		2023	(United States) Austin FC Academy	1	0
36	Greg Monroe	(United States)	Goalkeeper	January 3, 2001 (age 25)	2023	(United States) Sienna College	0	0
37	Nicolas Aristizabal	(United States)	Goalkeeper		2023	(United States) Austin FC Academy	0	0
Defenders
2	Cheick Touré	(Netherlands)	DF	February 7, 2001 (age 25)	2023	(Netherlands) Jong PSV	29	0
4	Kipp Keller	(United States)	DF	July 14, 2000 (age 25)	2023	(United States) Austin FC	16	0
5	Salvatore Mazzaferro	(Canada)	DF	October 11, 2001 (age 24)	2023	(United States) South Florida	31	3
22	Joe Hafferty (captain)	(United States)	DF	March 21, 1998 (age 28)	2023	(United States) Tacoma Defiance	31	1
25	Anthony De Anda	(United States)	DF	May 5, 2005 (age 21)	2023	(United States) Austin FC Academy	9	0
26	Charlie Asensio	(United States)	DF	January 18, 2000 (age 26)	2023	(United States) Austin FC	24	0
77	Chris Pinkham	(United States)	DF	November 5, 1998 (age 27)	2023	(United States) New Hampshire Wildcats	10	0
	Nick Kashambuzi	(United States)	DF		2023	(United States) Austin FC Academy	0	0
Midfielders
7	Micah Burton	(United States)	MF	March 26, 2006 (age 20)	2023	(United States) Austin FC Academy	24	2
13	Leo Torres	(United States)	MF	January 22, 2004 (age 22)	2023	(United States) San Antonio FC	6	1
15	Steeve Louis Jean	(Haiti)	MF	September 6, 2004 (age 21)	2023	(United States) Leg A-Z Soccer	25	0
18	Bobosi Byaruhanga	(Uganda)	MF	December 3, 2001 (age 24)	2023	(Czech Republic) MFK Vyškov	26	1
19	CJ Fodrey	(United States)	MF	February 10, 2004 (age 22)	2023	(United States) Austin FC	22	4
21	Valentin Noël	(France)	MF	April 27, 1999 (age 27)	2023	(United States) Pittsburgh	30	8
23	Alonso Ramírez	(Mexico)	MF	August 20, 2001 (age 24)	2023	(Mexico) Atlas F.C.	30	4
24	Jackson Wälti	(United States)	MF	December 7, 1999 (age 26)	2023	(United States) Pittsburgh	12	0
32	Ervin Torres	(United States)	MF	November 14, 2007 (age 18)	2023	(United States) Austin FC Academy	3	0
35	Bryan Arellano	(United States)	MF	June 6, 2005 (age 21)	2023	(United States) Austin FC Academy	7	1
99	Christo Vela	(Mexico)	MF	July 30, 2004 (age 21)	2023	(Mexico) Cancún F.C.	22	2
	Jordan Franco	(United States)	MF		2023	(United States) Austin FC Academy	0	0
Forward
9	Sébastien Pineau	(Peru)	FW	January 20, 2003 (age 23)	2023	(Peru) Alianza Lima	29	7
10	David Rodríguez	(United States)	FW	May 5, 2002 (age 24)	2023	(Mexico) Atlético San Luis	24	6
11	EJ Johnson	(United States)	FW	May 11, 2003 (age 23)	2023	(Scotland) Hibernian	23	1
14	Jonathan Santillan	(United States)	FW	September 9, 2004 (age 21)	2023	(United States) Queensboro FC	12	0
28	Alfonso Ocampo-Chavez	(United States)	FW	March 25, 2002 (age 24)	2023	(United States) Austin FC	25	4

== Transfers ==
=== In ===
Date	Position	No.	Name	From	Fee	Ref.
January 5, 2023	DF	2	(Netherlands) Cheick Touré	(Netherlands) Jong PSV	Free	
January 10, 2023	GK	1	(United States) Eric Lopez	(United States) LA Galaxy II	Free	
January 23, 2023	DF	25	(United States) Anthony De Anda	(United States) Austin FC Academy	Free	
January 24, 2023	MF	13	(United States) Leo Torres	(United States) San Antonio FC	Free	
January 24, 2023	DF	77	(United States) Chris Pinkham	(United States) New Hampshire Wildcats	Free	
February 23, 2023	FW	9	(Peru) Sébastien Pineau	(Peru) Alianza Lima		
March 3, 2023	DF	5	(Canada) Salvatore Mazzaferro	(United States) South Florida	Free	
March 3, 2023	MF	24	(United States) Jackson Wälti	(United States) Pittsburgh	Free	
March 3, 2023	MF	21	(France) Valentin Noël	(United States) Pittsburgh	Free	
March 16, 2023	DF	22	(United States) Joe Hafferty	(United States) Tacoma Defiance	Free	
March 16, 2023	FW	14	(United States) Jonathan Santillan	(United States) Queensboro FC	Free	
March 23, 2023	MF	7	(United States) Micah Burton	(United States) Austin FC Academy	Free	
March 24, 2023	MF	35	(United States) Bryan Arellano	(United States) Austin FC Academy	Amateur Agreement	
March 24, 2023	MF		(United States) Jordan Franco	(United States) Austin FC Academy	Amateur Agreement	
March 24, 2023	DF		(United States) Nick Kashambuzi	(United States) Austin FC Academy	Amateur Agreement	
March 24, 2023	GK		(United States) Spencer Sanderson	(United States) Austin FC Academy	Amateur Agreement	
March 24, 2023	MF	32	(United States) Ervin Torres	(United States) Austin FC Academy	Amateur Agreement	
March 24, 2023	MF	15	(Haiti) Steeve Louis Jean	(United States) Leg A-Z Soccer	Amateur Agreement	
June 16, 2023	MF	35	(United States) Bryan Arellano	(United States) Austin FC Academy	Free	
June 23, 2023	MF	15	(Haiti) Steeve Louis Jean	(United States) Leg A-Z Soccer	Free	
September 22, 2023	GK		(United States) Nicolas Aristizabal	(United States) Austin FC Academy	Amateur agreement	
September 22, 2023	GK		(United States) Greg Monroe	(United States) Sienna College	Amateur agreement	

=== Loan In ===
No.	Pos.	Player	Loaned from	Start	End	Source
18	MF	(Uganda) Bobosi Byaruhanga	(Czech Republic) MFK Vyskov	January 5, 2023	December 31, 2023	
10	FW	(United States) David Rodríguez	(Mexico) Atlético San Luis	January 5, 2023	December 31, 2023	
11	FW	(United States) EJ Johnson	(Scotland) Hibernian	January 31, 2023	December 31, 2023	
99	MF	(Mexico) Christo Vela	(Mexico) Cancún F.C.	February 13, 2023	December 31, 2023	
23	MF	(Mexico) Alonso Ramírez	(Mexico) Atlas F.C.	March 2, 2023	December 31, 2023	
26	DF	(United States) Charlie Asensio	(United States) Austin FC	March 24, 2023	December 31, 2023	
29	MF	(United States) CJ Fodrey	(United States) Austin FC	March 24, 2023	December 31, 2023	
4	DF	(United States) Kipp Keller	(United States) Austin FC	March 24, 2023	December 31, 2023	
23	GK	(United States) Damian Las	(United States) Austin FC	March 24, 2023	December 31, 2023	
28	FW	(United States) Alfonso Ocampo-Chavez	(United States) Austin FC	March 24, 2023	December 31, 2023	

=== Out ===
Date	Position	No.	Name	To	Type	Fee	Ref.
July 28, 2023	MF	24	(United States) Jackson Wälti	(United States) Colorado Rapids 2	Transfer		
September 8, 2023	GK	1	(United States) Eric Lopez	(United States) Orange County SC	Transfer		

== Non-competitive fixtures ==
=== Preseason ===
February 4, 2023	Austin FC II	1–1 (3–5 p)	Alamo City SC	Austin, Texas
				Stadium: St. David's Performance Center

February 11, 2023	Austin FC II	v	Roots Academy	Austin, Texas
				Stadium: St. David's Performance Center
Note: Houston Dynamo 2 had to cancel due to Houston Dynamo having player Visa issues for their game in Florida, so they took extra Houston Dynamo 2 players.

February 18, 2023	Florida International University	0–2	Austin FC II
		Report

February 26, 2023	Austin FC II	v	Houston Christian University	Austin, Texas
				Stadium: St. David's Performance Center

March 4, 2023	Rio Grande Valley FC	2–1	Austin FC II	Edinburg, Texas
		Report		Stadium: H-E-B Park

March 10, 2023	Austin FC II	v	Richland College	Austin, Texas
				Stadium: St. David's Performance Center

== Competitive fixtures ==
=== Major League Soccer Regular Season ===
==== Standings ====
===== Western Conference =====
Pos	Div	Team	Pld	W	SOW	SOL	L	GF	GA	GD	Pts	Qualification
2	PC	Tacoma Defiance	28	14	6	3	5	54	33	+21	57	Qualification for the Playoffs
3	FR	Sporting Kansas City II	28	13	4	2	9	59	41	+18	49	Qualification for the Playoffs
4	FR	Austin FC II	28	12	4	5	7	40	23	+17	49	Qualification for the Playoffs
5	FR	St. Louis City 2	28	11	5	4	8	48	38	+10	47	Qualification for the Playoffs
6	PC	San Jose Earthquakes II	28	11	5	2	10	41	36	+5	45	Qualification for the Playoffs

Source: MLSNP Western Conference
Rules for classification: 1) points; 2) total wins; 3) total goal differential; 4) total goals scored; 5) fewer disciplinary points; 6) away goal differential; 7) away goals scored; 8) home goals differential; 9) home goals scored; 10) coin toss (2 clubs tied) or drawing of lots (≥3 clubs tied)

===== Overall =====
Pos	Team	Pld	W	SOW	SOL	L	GF	GA	GD	Pts	Awards
6	New York Red Bulls II	28	14	3	3	8	53	36	+17	51	U.S. Open Cup First Round
7	Sporting Kansas City II	28	13	4	2	9	60	42	+18	49	U.S. Open Cup First Round
8	Austin FC II	28	12	4	5	7	40	23	+17	49	
9	St. Louis City 2	28	11	5	4	8	49	39	+10	47	
10	Orlando City B	28	13	2	3	10	59	61	−2	46	

Source: MLSNP
Rules for classification: 1) points; 2) total wins; 3) total goal differential; 4) total goals scored; 5) fewer disciplinary points; 6) away goal differential; 7) away goals scored; 8) home goals differential; 9) home goals scored; 10) coin toss (2 clubs tied) or drawing of lots (≥3 clubs tied)

==== Matches ====
March 24, 2023 1	Austin FC II	2–1	Houston Dynamo 2	Austin, Texas
8:00 pm CDT	Vela (yellow card) 28'; Noël 64', 83'; Fodrey (yellow card) 90+8'	Report	Avila (yellow card) 18' (yellow-red card) 90+3'; Evans (yellow card) 36'; Ndoye 49'; Murana (yellow card) 60'; Maples (yellow card) 85'; Soto (yellow card) 90+1'	Stadium: Parmer Field; Referee: Jeremy Scheer

April 2, 2023 2	Sporting Kansas City II	1–1 (4–2 SO)	Austin FC II	Lawrence, Kansas
3:00 pm CDT	Cruz (yellow card) 56'; Videal 67'	Report	Hafferty (yellow card) 37'; Burton (yellow card) 39'; Walti (yellow card) 48'; Ocampo-Chavez 72'	Stadium: Rock Chalk Park; Referee: Gabriele Giusti
	Shootout
	Vidal (penalty scored); Draper (penalty scored); Rosa (penalty scored); Flores (penalty scored)		Ramírez (penalty scored); Fodrey (penalty missed); Jean (penalty missed); Arellano (penalty scored)

April 7, 2023 3	Austin FC II	2–1	Tacoma Defiance	Austin, Texas
7:00 pm CDT	Ramírez (yellow card) 24', (goal) 84'; Touré (yellow card) 31'; Vela 90+4'	Report	Cissoko 22' (pen.), (yellow card) 84'; Sousa (yellow card) 42' (yellow-red card) 66'; Ovalle (yellow card) 25'; Rodrigues (yellow card) 47'; Baker-Whiting (yellow card) 73'	Stadium: Parmer Field; Referee: Luis Guardia

April 12, 2023 4	Austin FC II	3–0	North Texas SC	Austin, Texas
7:00 pm CDT	Noël 8' (pen.), 12'; Ocampo-Chavez 13'; Fodrey (yellow card) 14'; Las (yellow card) 87'	Report	Luque (yellow card) 42'; Rose (yellow card) 51'; Korça (yellow card) 66'	Stadium: Parmer Field; Referee: Gerald Flores

April 16, 2023 5	Austin FC II	2–0	St. Louis City SC 2	Austin, Texas
6:00 pm CDT	Keller (yellow card) 37'; Rodríguez 66'; Burton 88'	Report	Volmer (yellow card) 45'; Jackson (yellow card) 90+5'	Stadium: Parmer Field; Referee: William Hale

April 23, 2023 6	LA Galaxy II	1–1 (5–4 SO)	Austin FC II	Carson, California
7:00 pm CDT	Picazo 41'; Klein (yellow card) 43'	Report	Byaruhanga 21'; Walti (yellow card) 29'; Mazzaferro (yellow card) 34'; Hafferty (yellow card) 52'; Louis Jean (yellow card) 83'	Stadium: Dignity Health Sports Park; Referee: Brad Jensen
	Shootout
	Rudisill (penalty scored); Téllez (penalty scored); Pérez (penalty scored); López (penalty scored); Saldaña (penalty missed); Amadin (penalty scored)		Noël (penalty scored); Byaruhanga (penalty missed); Touré (penalty scored); Asensio (penalty scored); Pineau (penalty scored); Mazzaferro (penalty missed)

April 28, 2023 7	Austin FC II	1–1 (6–5 SO)	Minnesota United FC 2	Austin, Texas
6:00 pm CDT	Touré (yellow card) 45+1' (red card); Fodrey (yellow card) 56'; Johnson 86', (yellow card) 90'; Burton (yellow card) 90+1'	Report	Pacheco 54', (yellow card) 90+1'	Stadium: Parmer Field; Referee: John Matto
	Shootout
	Rodríguez (penalty scored); Asensio (penalty missed); Noël (penalty missed); Johnson (penalty scored); Hafferty (penalty scored); Pineau (penalty scored); Santillan (penalty scored); Burton (penalty scored)		Pacheco (penalty scored); O'Driscoll (penalty scored); Mesanvi (penalty missed); Khan (penalty scored); Mosquera (penalty missed); Richardson (penalty scored); Fischer (penalty scored); Leatherman (penalty missed)

May 7, 2023 8	Portland Timbers 2	0–1	Austin FC II	Portland, Oregon
7:00 pm CDT	Griffith (yellow card) 32'	Report	Rodríguez 4'; Keller (yellow card) 25'; Asensio (yellow card) 71'; Ocampo-Chaves (yellow card) 71'; Jean (yellow card) 77'	Stadium: Providence Park; Referee: Karen Callado

May 14, 2023 9	Colorado Rapids 2	1–0	Austin FC II	Denver, Colorado
5:00 pm CST	Bombito (yellow card) 9'; Vargas 51'; Larraz (yellow card) 61'; Beaudry (yellow card) 89'	Report		Stadium: CIBER Field; Referee: Laura Rodriguez

May 19, 2023 10	Austin FC II	0–1	San Jose Earthquakes II	Austin, Texas
8:00 pm CDT	Tingey (yellow card) 11'; Castro (yellow card) 14'; Cilley (yellow card) 31'; Hategan 33'; Serrano (yellow card) 75'	Report	Touré (yellow card) 25'; Ramírez (yellow card) 39'; Rodríguez (yellow card) 90+3'	Stadium: Parmer Field; Referee: Danielle Chesky

May 28, 2023 11	Houston Dynamo 2	2–0	Austin FC II	Houston, Texas
5:00 pm CDT	D. Gonzalez 11'; Maples (yellow card) 31'; Auguste 40'; Evans (yellow card) 61'; Dorsey (yellow card) 65'; LeFlore (yellow card) 75'	Report	Louis Jean (yellow card) 82'; Keller (yellow card) 90+5'	Stadium: AVEVA Stadium; Referee: Josiah Parke

June 2, 2023 12	Austin FC II	3–0	Real Monarchs	Austin, Texas
8:00 pm CDT	David Rodríguez 38', 47'; Noël 81'	Report	Arias (yellow card) 20'	Stadium: Parmer Field; Referee: Jeremy Scheer

June 9, 2023 13	Austin FC II	1–0	Whitecaps FC 2	Austin, Texas
8:00 pm CDT	Fodrey (yellow card) 66', (goal) 75'; Louis Jean (yellow card) 90+5'; Pineau (yellow card) 90+7'	Report	Dasovic (yellow card) 41'; Hasal (red card) 67'; Campagna (yellow card) 90+6'	Stadium: Parmer Field; Referee: Melvin Rivas

June 14, 2023 14	St. Louis City SC 2	0–1	Austin FC II	St. Louis, Missouri
7:00 pm CDT	Schneider (yellow card) 87'; O'Malley (yellow card) 88'	Report	Burton (yellow card) 66'; Fodrey 69'; Las (yellow card) 86'	Stadium: Citypark; Referee: Austin Saini

June 18, 2023 15	Austin FC II	4–0	Portland Timbers 2	Austin, Texas
6:00 pm CDT	Pineau 21', 59'; Mazzaferro 26'; Rodríguez 61'; Santillan (yellow card) 74'	Report	Ferdinand (yellow card) 57'	Stadium: Parmer Field; Referee: DeShun Beard

June 25, 2023 16	Tacoma Defiance	1–0	Austin FC II	Tukwila, Washington
9:00 pm CDT	Rodrigues 32' (pen.)	Report	Walti (red card) 82'	Stadium: Starfire Sports Complex; Referee: Brad Jensen

June 30, 2023 17	Real Monarchs	0–0 (3–4 SO)	Austin FC II	Herriman, Utah
10:00 pm CDT	Nigro (yellow card) 69'	Report		Stadium: Zions Bank Stadium; Referee: Laura Rodriguez
	Shootout
	Nigro (penalty scored); Mertens (penalty scored); Iskenderian (penalty scored); Vázquez (penalty missed); Williams (penalty missed)		Santillan (penalty scored); Pineau (penalty missed); Pinkham (penalty scored); Ramírez (penalty scored); Fodrey (penalty scored)

July 7, 2023 18	Austin FC II	3–0	Houston Dynamo 2	Austin, Texas
8:00 pm CDT	Johnson (yellow card) 42'; Fodrey 44', (yellow card) 82'; Pineau 56'; Hafferty (yellow card) 68'; Vela 79'	Report	González (yellow card) 35'; Udanoh (yellow card) 45+2'; Juarez (yellow card) 81'; Auguste (red card) 82'; Gonzalez (yellow card) 84'	Stadium: Parmer Field; Referee: Joe Surgan

July 23, 2023 19	Colorado Rapids 2	3–3 (6–5 SO)	Austin FC II	Denver, Colorado
7:30pm CDT	Batiste (yellow card) 11'; Larraz (yellow card) 42', (goal) 66'; Edwards (yellow card) 51'; Vargas 58' (pen.); Touré 78' (o.g.); Amadou (yellow card) 81'; Serna (yellow card) 84'; Malone (yellow card) 90'	Report	Fodrey 6', (yellow card) 90+3'; Pineau (yellow card) 12', (goal) 20'; Mazzaferro 29'; Ramírez (yellow card) 50'; Burton (yellow card) 60'; Las (yellow card) 69'	Stadium: Denver Soccer Stadium; Referee: Olvin Oliva
	Shootout
	Larraz (penalty scored); Hanya (penalty scored); Serna (penalty scored); Markanich (penalty scored); Aguirre (penalty scored); Miller (penalty scored)		Santillan (penalty scored); Hafferty (penalty scored); Walti (penalty scored); Pinkham (penalty scored); Vela (penalty scored); Johnson (penalty missed)

July 30, 2023 20	Austin FC II	4–0	LA Galaxy II	Austin, Texas
6:00 pm CDT	Burton 12'; Jean (yellow card) 15'; Vela (yellow card) 40'; Ramírez 61' (pen.); Torres 68'; De Anda (yellow card) 90+1'; Arellano 90+5' (pen.)	Report	Schelotto (yellow card) 44' (yellow-red card) 71'; López (yellow card) 56'; González (yellow card) 60'	Stadium: Parmer Field; Referee: Kyle Armstrong

August 6, 2023 21	Los Angeles FC 2	0–0 (3–4 SO)	Austin FC II	Fullerton, California
7:00 pm CDT	Jaime (yellow card) 18'; Musto (red card) 22'	Report	Touré (yellow card) 26'; Burton (yellow card) 70'	Stadium: Titan Stadium; Referee: Corbyn May
	Shootout
	Evans (penalty scored); Flores (penalty scored); Romero (penalty missed); Rosales (penalty missed); Bombino (penalty scored); Aguirre (penalty missed); Jaime (penalty missed)		Vela (penalty missed); Ocampo-Chavez (penalty missed); Pinkham (penalty scored); Hafferty (penalty scored); Noël (penalty scored); Torres (penalty missed); Touré (penalty scored)

August 12, 2023 22	San Jose Earthquakes II	0–2	Austin FC II	San Jose, California
9:00 pm CDT	Walls (yellow card) 43'; Blancas (yellow card) 73'; Cano (yellow card) 83'; Cilley (yellow card) 90+3'	Report	Louis Jean (yellow card) 45+1'; Pineau 50', 89'; Johnson (yellow card) 77'	Stadium: PayPal Park

August 20, 2023 23	Whitecaps FC 2	1–1 (4–3 SO)	Austin FC II	Vancouver, Canada
4:00 pm CDT	Simmons (yellow card) 51'; Gherasimencov 87'	Report	Noel 62'; Vela (yellow card) 68'; Touré (yellow card) 78'	Stadium: BC Place; Referee: Mazzen Black
	Shootout
	Becher (penalty scored); Aguilar (penalty missed); Coupland (penalty scored); Wright (penalty scored); Simmons (penalty scored)		Ocampo-Chavez (penalty missed); Burton (penalty scored); Ramírez (penalty scored); Hafferty (penalty missed); Touré (penalty scored)

August 25, 2023 24	Austin FC II	1–2	Sporting Kansas City II	Austin, Texas
8:00 pm CDT	Mazzaferro 48'; Burton (yellow card) 61'; Hafferty (yellow card) 80'; Rodríguez (yellow card) 84'	Report	Cunningham (yellow card) 12'; Lenis (yellow card) 24'; Cruz (yellow card) 31'; Rosa 58'; Tschantret 62'; Bryant (yellow card) 84'	Stadium: Parmer Field; Referee: Wes Caouette

September 1, 2023 25	Austin FC II	1–1 (5–4 SO)	Los Angeles FC 2	Austin, Texas
8:00 pm CDT	Hafferty 13' (yellow card) 90+2'; Las (yellow card) 69'; Burton (yellow card) 70'; Louis Jean (yellow card) 79'; Noël (yellow card) 84'	Report	Batioja 68' (pen.); Subah (yellow card) 89'	Stadium: Parmer Field; Referee: Melinda Sopka
	Shootout
	Ramírez (penalty scored); Hafferty (penalty scored); Rodríguez (penalty scored); Noël (penalty scored); Touré (penalty scored)		Leone (penalty scored); Gaines (penalty scored); Flores (penalty scored); Crépeau (penalty scored); Subah (penalty missed)

September 10, 2023 26	Minnesota United FC 2	1–1 (9–8 SO)	Austin FC II	Blaine, Minnesota
5:00 pm CDT	Mosquera (yellow card) 45+4'; Iwe (yellow card) 51'; Richardson (yellow card) 53'; Lacey 73' (pen.)	Report	Ocampo-Chavez 36'; Pinkham (yellow card) 59'; Noel (yellow card) 71'	Stadium: National Sports Center Stadium; Referee: Thomas Snyder
	Shootout
	Pacheco (penalty scored); Bello (penalty missed); Randell (penalty missed); Mesanvi (penalty scored); Ramos (penalty scored); Marqués (penalty scored); Richardson (penalty missed); Romanshyn (penalty missed); Gbo (penalty scored); Rodas (penalty scored); Emmings (penalty scored); Pacheco (penalty scored); Bello (penalty scored)		Pinkham (penalty scored); Asensio (penalty scored); Ramírez (penalty scored); Noël (penalty missed); Hafferty (penalty missed); Pineau (penalty scored); L. Torres (penalty missed); Las (penalty missed); Vela (penalty scored); Mazzaferro (penalty scored); Louis Jean (penalty scored); Pinkham (penalty scored); Asensio (penalty missed)

September 15, 2023 27	Austin FC II	1–2	Colorado Rapids 2	Austin, Texas
8:00 pm CDT	Ocampo-Chavez 26'; Burton (yellow card) 51'	Report	Cabral 28', 74'; Flores (yellow card) 90'; Yapi (yellow card) 90'	Stadium: Parmer Field; Referee: Elton García

September 24, 2023 28	North Texas SC	3–1	Austin FC II	Arlington, Texas
4:00 pm CDT	Endeley 22'; Avayevu 38'; Mulato 46'	Report	Pineau 69'	Stadium: Choctaw Stadium; Attendance: 1,031; Referee: Muhammad Hassan

=== MLS Next Pro Playoffs ===
September 29, 2023 First Round	Sporting Kansas City II	0–2	Austin FC II	Lawrence, Kansas
7:00 pm CDT	Mekideche (yellow card) 32'	Report	Pineau (yellow card) 44'; Rodríguez 52'; Touré (yellow card) 54'; Ramírez 86'; Las (yellow card) 90+3'	Stadium: Rock Chalk Park; Referee: Brandon Stevis

October 8, 2023 Conference Semifinals	Tacoma Defiance	0–1	Austin FC II	Tukwila, Washington
9:00 p.m. CDT	B. Rodrigues (yellow card) 61'; Cissoko (red card) 69'; Daroma (yellow card) 74'; Ovalle (yellow card) 89'	Report	Vela (yellow card) 30'; Pinkham (red card) 69'; Noël 82'; Ocampo-Chavez (yellow card) 89'	Stadium: Starfire Sports; Referee: John Griggs

October 15 Conference Finals	Colorado Rapids 2	0–0 (a.e.t.) (1–4 p)	Austin FC II	Commerce City, Colorado
7:30 p.m. MDT	Larraz (yellow card) 40'; Vargas (yellow card) 65'; Cabral (yellow card) 100'	Report	Hafferty (yellow card) 105+1'; Touré (yellow card) 117'	Stadium: Dick's Sporting Goods Park; Referee: Alexis Da Silva
	Penalties
	Larraz (penalty missed); Hanya (penalty scored); Yapi (penalty missed)		Noël (penalty scored); Hafferty (penalty scored); Ramírez (penalty scored); Santillan (penalty scored)

October 22 MLS Next Pro Cup Finals	Columbus Crew 2	1–3	Austin FC II	Columbus, Ohio
EDT	Roberts 49' (pen.); Micaletto (yellow card) 63'; Fuson (yellow card) 90+4'	Report	Ramírez 70' (pen.); Noël 77'; Almeida 80' (o.g.)	Stadium: Lower.com Field; Referee: Calin Radosav

== Statistics ==
=== Appearances and goals ===
Numbers after plus–sign (+) denote appearances as a substitute.

No.	Pos	Nat	Player	Total		MLSNP		MLSNP Playoffs	
No.	Pos	Nat	Player	Apps	Goals	Apps	Goals	Apps	Goals
1	GK	(United States) USA	Eric Lopez	0	0	0+0	0	0+0	0
2	DF	(Netherlands) NED	Cheick Touré	29	0	19+6	0	4+0	0
4	DF	(United States) USA	Kipp Keller	16	0	15+1	0	0+0	0
5	DF	(Canada) CAN	Salvatore Mazzaferro	31	3	27+0	3	4+0	0
7	MF	(United States) USA	Micah Burton	24	2	13+8	2	1+2	0
9	FW	(Peru) PER	Sébastien Pineau	29	7	13+12	7	4+0	0
10	FW	(United States) USA	David Rodríguez	24	6	15+5	5	4+0	1
11	FW	(United States) USA	EJ Johnson	23	1	11+10	1	0+2	0
12	GK	(United States) USA	Damian Las	31	0	27+0	0	4+0	0
13	MF	(United States) USA	Leo Torres	6	1	0+6	1	0+0	0
14	FW	(United States) USA	Jonathan Santillan	12	0	1+10	0	0+1	0
15	MF	(Haiti) HAI	Steeve Louis Jean	25	0	13+11	0	1+0	0
18	MF	(Uganda) UGA	Bobosi Byaruhanga	27	0	17+6	0	3+1	0
19	MF	(United States) USA	CJ Fodrey	22	4	15+5	4	0+2	0
21	MF	(France) FRA	Valentin Noël	31	8	26+1	6	4+0	2
22	DF	(United States) USA	Joe Hafferty	31	1	25+2	1	4+0	0
23	DF	(Mexico) MEX	Alonso Ramírez	30	3	19+7	1	4+0	2
24	MF	(United States) USA	Jackson Wälti	12	0	7+5	0	0+0	0
25	DF	(United States) USA	Anthony De Anda	9	0	6+3	0	0+0	0
26	DF	(United States) USA	Charlie Asensio	24	0	14+6	0	3+1	0
28	FW	(United States) USA	Alfonso Ocampo-Chavez	25	4	16+6	4	0+3	0
30	GK	(United States) USA	Spencer Sanderson	1	0	1+0	0	0+0	0
32	MF	(United States) USA	Ervin Torres	4	0	0+4	0	0+0	0
35	MF	(United States) USA	Bryan Arellano	7	1	0+7	1	0+0	0
36	GK	(United States) USA	Greg Monroe	0	0	0+0	0	0+0	0
37	GK	(United States) USA	Nicolas Aristizabal	0	0	0+0	0	0+0	0
77	DF	(United States) USA	Chris Pinkham	10	0	4+4	0	0+2	0
99	MF	(Mexico) MEX	Christo Vela	22	2	5+13	2	3+1	0
	MF	(United States) USA	Jordan Franco	0	0	0+0	0	0+0	0
	DF	(United States) USA	Nick Kashambuzi	0	0	0+0	0	0+0	0

- Last updated: October 21, 2023
- Source: https://www.mlsnextpro.com/stats/players/#season=2023&competition=mls-next-pro&club=20220&statType=general&position=all

=== Top scorers ===
Rank	Position	Number	Name	MLSNP	MLSNP Playoffs	Total
1	MF	21	(France) Valentin Noël	6	2	8
2	FW	9	(Peru) Sébastien Pineau	7	0	7
3	MF	10	(United States) David Rodríguez	5	1	6
4	FW	19	(United States) CJ Fodrey	4	0	4
4	MF	23	(Mexico) Alonso Ramírez	2	2	4
4	FW	28	(United States) Alfonso Ocampo-Chavez	4	0	4
7	DF	5	(Canada) Salvatore Mazzaferro	3	0	3
8	MF	7	(United States) Micah Burton	2	0	2
8	MF	99	(Mexico) Christo Vela	2	0	2
10	FW	11	(United States) EJ Johnson	1	0	1
10	MF	18	(Uganda) Bobosi Byaruhanga	1	0	1
10	DF	22	(United States) Joe Hafferty	1	0	1
10	MF	32	(United States) Ervin Torres	1	0	1
10	MF	35	(United States) Bryan Arellano	1	0	1
Total				40	5	45

- Last updated: October 22, 2023
- Source: https://www.mlsnextpro.com/stats/players/#season=2023&competition=mls-next-pro&club=20220&statType=general&position=all

=== Top assists ===
Rank	Position	Number	Name	MLSNP	MLSNP Playoffs	Total
1	DF	2	(Netherlands) Cheick Touré	4	0	4
2	FW	10	(Mexico) David Rodríguez	2	1	3
2	MF	18	(Uganda) Bobosi Byaruhanga	2	1	3
2	MF	21	(France) Valentin Noël	3	0	3
5	FW	19	(United States) CJ Fodrey	1	1	2
5	FW	28	(United States) Alfonso Ocampo-Chavez	2	0	
7	FW	11	(United States) EJ Johnson (soccer)	1	0	1
7	FW	14	(United States) Jonathan Santillan	1	0	1
7	MF	15	(Haiti) Steeve Louis Jean	1	0	1
7	MF	21	(France) Valentin Noël	1	0	1
7	DF	22	(United States) Joe Hafferty	1	0	1
7	MF	23	(Mexico) Alonso Ramírez	1	0	1
7	DF	77	(United States) Chris Pinkham	1	0	1
7	MF	99	(Mexico) Christo Vela	1	0	1
Total				22	3	25

- Last updated: October 21, 2023
- Source: https://www.mlsnextpro.com/stats/players/#season=2023&competition=mls-next-pro&club=20220&statType=general&position=all

=== Disciplinary record ===
No.	Pos.	Player	MLSNP			MLSNP Playoffs			Total		
No.	Pos.	Player	Booked	(yellow card) (yellow-red card)	Sent off (straight red)	Booked	(yellow card) (yellow-red card)	Sent off (straight red)	Booked	(yellow card) (yellow-red card)	Sent off (straight red)
1	GK	(United States) Eric Lopez	0	0	0	0	0	0	0	0	0
2	DF	(Netherlands) Cheick Touré	4	1	0	1	0	0	5	1	0
4	DF	(United States) Kipp Keller	2	0	0	1	0	0	3	0	0
5	DF	(Canada) Salvatore Mazzaferro	1	0	0	0	0	0	1	0	0
7	MF	(United States) Micah Burton	8	0	0	0	0	0	8	0	0
9	FW	(Peru) Sébastien Pineau	2	0	0	1	0	0	3	0	0
10	FW	(Mexico) David Rodríguez	2	0	0	0	0	0	2	0	0
11	FW	(United States) EJ Johnson	3	0	0	0	0	0	3	0	0
12	GK	(United States) Damian Las	4	0	0	1	0	0	5	0	0
13	MF	(United States) Leo Torres	0	0	0	0	0	0	0	0	0
14	FW	(United States) Jonathan Santillan	1	0	0	0	0	0	1	0	0
15	MF	(Haiti) Steeve Louis Jean	6	0	0	0	0	0	6	0	0
18	MF	(Uganda) Bobosi Byaruhanga	0	0	0	0	0	0	0	0	0
19	MF	(United States) CJ Fodrey	6	0	0	0	0	0	6	0	0
21	MF	(France) Valentin Noël	3	0	0	0	0	0	3	0	0
22	DF	(United States) Joe Hafferty	5	0	0	1	0	0	6	0	0
23	MF	(Mexico) Alonso Ramírez	4	0	0	0	0	0	4	0	0
24	MF	(United States) Jackson Wälti	2	0	1	0	0	0	2	0	1
25	DF	(Mexico) Anthony De Anda	1	0	0	0	0	0	1	0	0
26	DF	(United States) Charlie Asensio	1	0	0	0	0	0	1	0	0
28	FW	(United States) Alfonso Ocampo-Chavez	1	0	0	1	0	0	2	0	0
32	MF	(United States) Ervin Torres	0	0	0	0	0	0	0	0	0
35	MF	(United States) Bryan Arellano	0	0	0	0	0	0	0	0	0
77	FW	(United States) Chris Pinkham	1	0	0	0	0	1	1	0	1
99	MF	(Mexico) Christo Vela	4	0	0	1	0	0	5	0	0
	GK	(United States) Nicolas Aristizabal	0	0	0	0	0	0	0	0	0
	GK	(United States) Greg Monroe	0	0	0	0	0	0	0	0	0
Total			55	1	1	7	0	1	62	1	2

- Last updated: October 21, 2023
- Source: https://www.mlsnextpro.com/stats/players/#season=2023&competition=mls-next-pro&club=20220&statType=general&position=all

=== Clean sheets ===
Rank	Number	Name	MLSNP	MLSNP Playoffs	Total
1	12	(United States) Damian Las	12	3	15

- Last updated: October 21, 2023
- Source: https://www.mlsnextpro.com/stats/players/#season=2023&competition=mls-next-pro&club=20220&statType=general&position=all

== Awards and honors ==
=== MLS Next Pro Cup ===
- Champions

=== MLS Next Pro Cup MVP ===
- Valentin Noël

=== MLS Next Pro Western Conference Play-offs ===
- Champions

=== MLSNP Best XI ===
Player	Position	Ref
(United States) Damian Las	GK	
(United States) Joe Hafferty	DF	

=== MLSNP Goalkeeper of the Year ===
Player	Ref
(United States) Damian Las	

=== MLSNP Save of the Year ===
Player	Ref
(United States) Damian Las	

=== MLSNP Midseason Goalkeeper of the Year ===
Player	Ref
(United States) Damian Las	

=== MLS All-Star Game Goalie Wars ===
Player	Ref
(United States) Damian Las	

=== MLSNP Team of the Week ===
Week	Team	Ref
4	Austin FC II	
13	Austin FC II	

=== MLSNP Goalkeeper of the Month ===
Month	Player	Ref
April	(United States) Damian Las	
June	(United States) Damian Las	
August	(United States) Damian Las	
