= Leo Torres =

American soccer player (born 2004)

Personal information
- Date of birth: January 22, 2004 (age 22)
- Place of birth: Devine, Texas, United States
- Height: 5 ft 8 in (1.73 m)
- Position: Attacking midfielder

Team information
- Current team: Austin FC II
- Number: 13

Youth career
- 2016–2019: San Antonio FC

Senior career*
Years	Team	Apps	(Gls)
2019–2022	San Antonio FC	8	(0)
2021	→ Real Monarchs (loan)	7	(2)
2022	→ Real Monarchs (loan)	11	(0)
2023–	Austin FC II	6	(1)

International career
2019	United States U15	5	(0)
- * Club domestic league appearances and goals as of 18:10, September 25, 2023 (UTC)

Leo Torres (born January 22, 2004) is an American professional soccer player who plays as an attacking midfielder for MLS Next Pro club Austin FC II.

== Career ==
=== San Antonio FC ===
On February 14, 2019, Torres signed his first professional contract with San Antonio FC. Aged 15 years and 23 days, Torres was the youngest player to ever sign a contract in the USL Championship. He made his league debut for the club on August 20, 2020, in a 4–0 away victory over OKC Energy.

==== Real Monarchs loan ====
On September 29, 2021, Torres moved on loan to USL Championship side Real Monarchs.

=== Austin FC II ===
On January 24, 2023, Austin FC II announced they had signed Torres to the club after his two seasons on loan with Real Monarchs. Torres played six games and scored one goal for Austin FC II during the season they won the 2023 MLS Next Pro Cup.

== Career statistics ==
As of October 22, 2023

Appearances and goals by club, season and competition
Club	League	Season	League		National cup		Continental		Other		Total	
Club	League	Season	Apps	Goals	Apps	Goals	Apps	Goals	Apps	Goals	Apps	Goals
San Antonio FC	USL Championship	2019	0	0	–		1	0	–		1	0
San Antonio FC	USL Championship	2020	2	0	–		0	0	–		2	0
San Antonio FC	USL Championship	2021	6	0	–		0	0	–		6	0
Real Monarchs (loan)	USL Championship	2021	7	2	–		0	0	–		7	2
Real Monarchs (loan)	MLS Next Pro	2022	11	0	–		–		–		11	0
Real Monarchs (loan)	Total		26	2	—		1	0	—		27	2
Austin FC II	MLS Next Pro	2023	6	1	–		–		0	0	6	1
Career total			33	3	1	0	—		0	0	34	3

== Honors ==
Austin FC II

- MLS Next Pro Cup: Champions – 2023
