= EJ Johnson (soccer) =

American soccer player (born 2003)

Personal information
- Full name: Emmanuel Johnson
- Date of birth: May 11, 2003 (age 23)
- Place of birth: Fairfield, California, United States
- Height: 6 ft 0 in (1.83 m)
- Positions: Defender; winger; forward

Youth career
- –2016: Northbay Elite
- 2016–2021: Sacramento Republic
- 2021–2022: Barça Residency Academy
- 2022: Hibernian

Senior career*
Years	Team	Apps	(Gls)
2022–2024	Hibernian	0	(0)
2022	→ Charleston Battery (loan)	13	(1)
2022–2023	→ FC Edinburgh (loan)	12	(2)
2023	→ Austin FC II (loan)	21	(1)
2024	Pittsburgh Riverhounds	21	(2)
2025	Oakland Roots	22	(1)
2026	San Antonio FC	6	(0)
- * Club domestic league appearances and goals as of April 20, 2025

Emmanuel "EJ" Johnson (born May 11, 2003) is an American professional soccer player who plays as a winger. He has previously played for Scottish clubs Hibernian and FC Edinburgh, and in the U.S. for USL Championship teams Charleston Battery and Pittsburgh Riverhounds SC, and MLS Next Pro side Austin FC II.

== Youth career ==
Emmanuel "EJ" Johnson played club soccer with Northbay Elite FC, before joining the Sacramento Republic academy in 2016, where he went on to make 90 appearances across various age group competitions through to 2020, tallying 29 goals in that time. In April 2021, Johnson signed a USL academy contract with Sacramento, making him eligible for the club's first-team in the USL Championship. Johnson joined the Barça Residency Academy in the United States in August 2021, before verbally committing to play college soccer at the University of California, Berkeley in 2022.

== Professional career ==
=== Hibernian ===
==== Charleston Battery loan ====
On February 10, 2022, Johnson signed a three-and-a-half-year deal with Scottish Premiership club Hibernian. After signing with Hibernian, Johnson was immediately loaned to USL Championship side Charleston Battery for their 2022 season. Johnson made his professional debut with Charleston on March 12, 2022, appearing as a 64th–minute substitute during a 1–0 victory over FC Tulsa. On June 4, 2022, Johnson scored his first professional goal for Charleston against Indy Eleven.

==== Hibernian F.C. Reserves ====
After securing a UK work permit, Johnson was recalled by Hibernian and ended his loan with the Battery on June 16, 2022. Johnson was recalled from his loan to Charleston Battery in June 2022, as he obtained a UK work permit and was added to the Hibs development squad. He was then loaned to Scottish League One club Edinburgh in July 2022.

==== Austin FC II loan ====
On 31 January 2023, Johnson changed his loan club, this time returning to the US to join MLS Next Pro side Austin FC II, the reserve team of Austin FC. Austin retained an option to make the move permanent. Johnson played in 21 games as a winger for Austin FC II throughout the season they won the 2023 MLS Next Pro Cup.

Johnson was released from his contract by Hibernian in January 2024.

=== Pittsburgh Riverhounds ===
On March 8, the Pittsburgh Riverhounds signed EJ Johnson on a 1-year deal only one day prior to their first game of the season against New Mexico United. He became a free agent following Pittsburgh's 2024 season.

=== Oakland Roots ===
On February 13, 2025, Johnson signed with fellow USL Championship club Oakland Roots. Johnson was released by Oakland following the 2025 season.

=== San Antonio FC ===
On March 17, 2026, Johnson signed a short-term 25-day contract with USL Championship side San Antonio FC. On 17 April 2026, San Antonio FC announced they had signed Johnson for the remainder of the 2026 season.

== Career statistics ==
As of September 29, 2023

Appearances and goals by club, season and competition
Club	League	Season	League		Domestic cup		Continental		Other		Total	
Club	League	Season	Apps	Goals	Apps	Goals	Apps	Goals	Apps	Goals	Apps	Goals
Charleston Battery	USL Championship	2022	13	1	1 (Note: Appearance(s) in 2022 U.S. Open Cup)	0	–		–		14	1
FC Edinburgh	Scottish League One	2022	12	2	–		–		–		12	2
Hibernian II	Scottish Challenge Cup	2022	0	0	–		–		1 (Note: Appearance(s) in 2022-23 Scottish Challenge Cup)	0	1	0
Austin FC II	MLS Next Pro	2023	21	1	–		–		2 (Note: Appearance(s) in MLSNP Playoffs)	0	23	1
Career total			46	5	1	0	0	0	3	0	50	5

== Honors ==
Austin FC II

- MLS Next Pro Cup: Champions – 2023
