= Joe Hafferty =

American soccer player (born 1998)

Personal information
- Full name: Joseph Hafferty
- Date of birth: March 21, 1998 (age 28)
- Place of birth: Renton, Washington, United States
- Height: 1.73 m (5 ft 8 in)
- Position: Defender

Team information
- Current team: Indy Eleven on loan from Lexington SC
- Number: 13

Youth career
- 2013–2017: Seattle Sounders

College career
| Years | Team | Apps | (Gls) |
| 2017–2020 | Oregon State Beavers | 61 | (2) |

Senior career*
| Years | Team | Apps | (Gls) |
| 2017 | Seattle Sounders 2 | 1 | (0) |
| 2021–2022 | Tacoma Defiance | 29 | (2) |
| 2023 | Austin FC II | 27 | (1) |
| 2023 | Austin FC | 0 | (0) |
| 2024–2025 | Las Vegas Lights | 26 | (1) |
| 2025– | Lexington SC | 44 | (2) |
| 2026– | → Indy Eleven (loan) | 12 | (1) |
- * Club domestic league appearances and goals as of November 6, 2026

Joseph Hafferty (born March 21, 1998) is an American soccer player who currently plays for USL Championship side Indy Eleven on loan from Lexington SC.

== Career ==
=== Youth ===
Hafferty has been with the Seattle Sounders FC Academy since 2013. On February 2, 2017, it was announced that he signed a letter of intent to play college soccer at Oregon State. On March 26, he made his debut for USL club Seattle Sounders FC 2 in a 2–1 defeat to Sacramento Republic.

=== College ===
Hafferty played college soccer at Oregon State University, and was a three-time All-Pac-12 selection, including back-to-back First Team nods as a junior and senior. During his time with the Beavers, Hafferty made 61 appearances, scored 2 goals and tallied 7 assists. His senior season saw him start all 8 games in an abbreviated senior season due to the COVID-19 pandemic.

=== Professional ===
==== Tacoma Defiance ====
Hafferty was drafted by Inter Miami CF in the second round of the 2021 MLS SuperDraft. On May 16, 2021, it was announced that Seattle Sounders FC had acquired the rights on Hafferty from Inter Miami on draft day, and would join Seattle's USL Championship side Tacoma Defiance.

==== Austin FC II ====
Hafferty transferred to the MLS Next Pro team Austin FC II on March 16, 2023, signing a one-year contract with a two year option. On September 20, 2023 he was called up to the Austin FC first team squad, on a short-term loan. At the end of the 2023 MLS Next Pro regular season, Hafferty was named to the 2023 MLS Next Pro Best XI. Hafferty was a starting center back for Austin FC II when they won the 2023 MLS Next Pro Cup, beating the Columbus Crew 2 by a score of 3–1.

=== Las Vegas Lights ===
Hafferty moved to the USL Championship side Las Vegas Lights on February 13, 2024.

=== Lexington SC ===
In January 2025, Las Vegas transferred Hafferty to Lexington SC for a club-record transfer fee.

=== Indy Eleven ===
In August 2026, Indy Eleven announced they had acquired Hafferty on loan from Lexington SC for the reminder of the 2026 USL Championship season.

== Career statistics ==
As of October 22, 2023

Appearances and goals by club, season and competition
| Club | League | Season | League | | National cup | | Continental | | Other | | Total | |
| Club | League | Season | Apps | Goals | Apps | Goals | Apps | Goals | Apps | Goals | Apps | Goals |
|---|---|---|---|---|---|---|---|---|---|---|---|---|
| Seattle Sounders FC 2 | United Soccer League | 2017 | 1 | 0 | – | | – | | – | | 1 | 0 |
| Tacoma Defiance | USL Championship | 2021 | 9 | 0 | – | | – | | – | | 9 | 0 |
| Tacoma Defiance | MLS Next Pro | 2022 | 22 | 2 | – | | – | | – | | 22 | 2 |
| Tacoma Defiance | Total | | 32 | 2 | — | | — | | — | | 32 | 2 |
| Austin FC II | MLS Next Pro | 2023 | 27 | 1 | – | | – | | 4 (Note: Appearance(s) in MLSNP Playoffs) | 0 | 31 | 1 |
| Career total | | | 59 | 3 | 0 | 0 | 0 | 0 | 4 | 0 | 63 | 3 |

== Honors ==
Club

- Austin FC II
  - MLS Next Pro Cup: Champions – 2023

Individual

- 2023 MLS Next Pro Best XI
