= Bobosi Byaruhanga =

Ugandan footballer (born 2001)

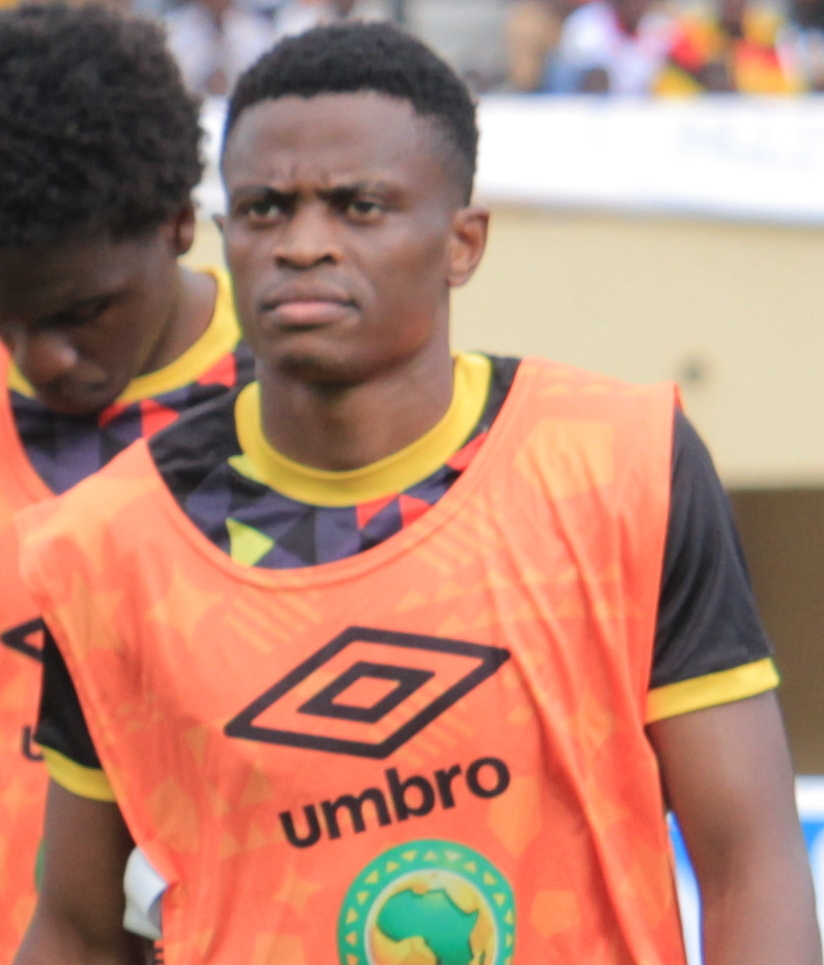

Personal information
- Date of birth: 3 December 2001 (age 24)
- Place of birth: Kisoro, Uganda
- Position: Midfielder

Team information
- Current team: Oakland Roots
- Number: 6

Youth career
- Vipers

Senior career*
Years	Team	Apps	(Gls)
2019–2021	Vipers	26	(3)
2022–2025	Vyškov	0	(0)
2023–2024	→ Austin FC II (loan)	47	(4)
2025–	Oakland Roots	48	(0)

International career^{‡}
2021	Uganda U20	6	(0)
2021–	Uganda	19	(0)
- * Club domestic league appearances and goals as of 10:56, 10 November 2026 (UTC) ‡ National team caps and goals as of 22:34, 13 October 2024 (UTC)

Bobosi Byaruhanga (born 3 December 2001) is a Ugandan professional footballer who plays as a midfielder for USL Championship club Oakland Roots and the Uganda national team.

== Club career ==
=== Vipers SC ===
Byaruhanga started his career with Vipers, progressing through the academy to win two league titles and the 2021 Airtel FUFA Male player of the year.

=== MFK Vyškov ===
In June 2022, he was linked with a move away from the club, and in August 2022, he made the move to the Czech Republic, joining Czech National Football League side Vyškov.

=== Austin FC II ===
In January 2023, he moved to American side Austin FC II on a season-long loan, with a purchase option. Byaruhanga was a starting midfielder for Austin FC II when they won the 2023 MLS Next Pro Cup, beating the Columbus Crew 2 by a score of 3–1. In February 2024, Austin FC announced they had resigned Byaruhanga on a second one year loan for the 2024 season.

=== Oakland Roots ===
On 4 March 2025, Oakland Roots officially confirmed the signing of Byaruhanga.

== International career ==
On December 7, 2025, he was selected by Paul Put for Uganda's squad to participate in the 2025 Africa Cup of Nations.

== Career statistics ==
=== Club ===
As of 6 October 2024

Appearances and goals by club, season and competition
Club	Season	League			National Cup		Continental		Other		Total	
Club	Season	Division	Apps	Goals	Apps	Goals	Apps	Goals	Apps	Goals	Apps	Goals
Vipers	2019–20	Uganda Premier League	14	1	0	0	–		0	0	14	1
Vipers	2020–21	Uganda Premier League	12	2	0	0	–		0	0	12	2
Vipers	Total		26	3	0	0	0	0	0	0	26	3
Vyškov	2022–23	Fortuna národní liga	0	0	0	0	–		0	0	0	0
Austin FC II (loan)	2023	MLS Next Pro	22	1	–		–		4 (Note: Appearance(s) in MLSNP Playoffs)	0	26	1
Austin FC II (loan)	2024	MLS Next Pro	25	3	0	0	–		0	0	25	3
Career total			72	7	0	0	0	0	4	0	76	7

=== International ===
As of matches played 11 October 2024

National team	Year	Apps	Goals
Uganda	2021	7	0
Uganda	2022	4	0
Uganda	2023	5	0
Uganda	2024	3	0
Total		19	0

== Honours ==
Club

Austin FC II

- MLS Next Pro: Champions: 2023

Vipers

- Uganda Premier League: Champions: 2022
- Uganda Cup: Champions: 2021

National

Uganda U20

- Africa U-20 Cup of Nations; Runner-up: 2021
