= Valentin Noël =

French footballer (born 1999)

Personal information
- Date of birth: 27 April 1999 (age 27)
- Place of birth: Niort, France
- Height: 5 ft 10 in (1.78 m)
- Position: Midfielder

Team information
- Current team: New Mexico United
- Number: 21

Youth career
- 2010–2016: Chamois Niortais

College career
Years	Team	Apps	(Gls)
2019–2022	Pittsburgh Panthers	77	(35)

Senior career*
Years	Team	Apps	(Gls)
2016–2020	Chamois Niortais II	34	(2)
2018–2020	Chamois Niortais	0	(0)
2023–2024	Austin FC II	25	(6)
2023	→ Austin FC (loan)	0	(0)
2024–2025	Las Vegas Lights	44	(11)
2025–	New Mexico United	34	(6)
- * Club domestic league appearances and goals as of 10:16, 10 November 2026 (UTC)

Valentin Noël (born 27 April 1999) is a French professional football player who plays as a midfielder for New Mexico United of the USL Championship.

== Career ==
=== Youth and college ===
Noël was born and raised in Niort, France playing for his hometown club Chamois Niortais F.C. as a youth player, earning a selection to the reserve team Niort II, earning 34 caps and 2 goals. In the 2018–2019 season, Noël was called up to Chamois Niortais F.C. but only spent one game on the bench, without earning a cap.

In 2019, Noël started attending University of Pittsburgh to play college soccer. Noël became a starter in his first year, going on to earn 77 starts, in which he scored 35 goals in addition to notching 13 assists over four years. Noel earned all-freshman team honors in 2019 and all ACC first-team honors in 2020 and 2022, in addition to all ACC second team honors in 2021. In Noel's standout season, he was selected as the 2020 Offensive Player of the Year.

=== Professional ===
==== Austin FC ====
In December 2022, Noël was selected as the 20th selection in the First Round of the 2023 MLS SuperDraft by Austin FC. In March 2023, Noêl signed with Austin FC's second team Austin FC II on a one-year contract. Noël quickly established himself as a team leader for Austin FC II, scoring a brace to help Austin FC II win their first every competitive match in MLS Next Pro. Noël signed a short-term loan agreement and made his first appearance with Austin FC's first team in a 1–3 loss to Mazatlán F.C. in their first ever Leagues Cup match, coming on in extra time. Noël was a starting midfielder for Austin FC II, scoring their second goal, when they won the 2023 MLS Next Pro Cup, beating the Columbus Crew 2 by 3–1. Noël was also named the 2023 MLS Next Pro Cup MVP.

==== Las Vegas Lights FC ====
On March 8, 2024, Noël transferred to the USL Championship club Las Vegas Lights FC from Austin FC II.

==== New Mexico United ====
On July 25, 2025, Noël was transferred from Las Vegas Lights to New Mexico United for an undisclosed fee.

== Career statistics ==
As of 9 November 2024

Appearances and goals by club, season and competition
Club	League	Season	League		League Cup		National Cup (Note: Includes U.S. Open Cup)		Other		Total	
Club	League	Season	Apps	Goals	Apps	Goals	Apps	Goals	Apps	Goals	Apps	Goals
Niort II	Championnat National 3	2016–2017	0	0	–		–		–		0	0
Niort II	Championnat National 3	2017–2018	14	0	–		–		–		14	0
Niort II	Championnat National 3	2018–2019	20	2	–		–		–		20	2
Niort II	Championnat National 3	2019–2020	0	0	–		–		–		0	0
Chamois Niortais F.C. (loan)	Ligue 2	2018–2019	0	0	–		0	0	–		0	0
Chamois Niortais F.C. (loan)	Club Total		34	2	–		0	0	–		34	2
Austin FC II	MLS Next Pro	2023	25	6	4 (Note: Appearance(s) in MLSNP Playoffs)	2	–		–		29	8
Austin FC (loan)	Major League Soccer	2023	0	0	–		0	0	1 (Note: Appearance(s) in Leagues Cup)	0	1	0
Austin FC (loan)	Club Total		25	6	4	2	0	0	0	0	30	8
Las Vegas Lights FC	USL Championship	2024	33	11	3 (Note: Appearance(s) in USLC Playoffs)	0	2	1	–		38	12
Las Vegas Lights FC	USL Championship	2025	17	1	0	0	1	0	4 (Note: Appearances in USL Cup)	0	22	1
New Mexico United	USL Championship	2025	-	-	-	-	-	-	-	-	-	-
Career total			109	20	7	2	3	1	5	0	117	23

== Honors ==
Austin FC II

- MLS Next Pro Cup: Champions – 2023

Individual

- 2023 MLS Next Pro Cup MVP
- All-ACC First Team: 2022
