= Austin FC II =

- Full name: Austin FC II
- Nickname: FCito
- Founded: December 13, 2022; 3 years ago
- Stadium: Parmer Field; Austin, Texas
- Capacity: 1,000
- Owner: Austin FC
- Chairman: Anthony Precourt
- Coach: Jason Shackell
- League: MLS Next Pro
- 2025: 9th, Western Conference; Playoffs: DNQ
- Website: austinfc.com/ii
| Home colors | Away colors |

Austin FC II is an American professional soccer team that is located in Austin, Texas. It is the reserve team of Austin FC and participates in MLS Next Pro, a division III league in the American soccer pyramid.

== History ==
On August 4, 2022, Austin FC was named as one of seven MLS clubs that would field a team in MLS Next Pro league beginning in the 2023 season. Austin's team, named Austin FC II, develops players in a professional environment, providing a pathway from MLS Next to Major League Soccer. Brett Uttley, a former assistant coach with Inter Miami CF, was announced as the first head coach for Austin FC II on December 13, 2022. The team consists of players signed directly with Austin FC II, those with first team contracts with Austin FC loaned to the second team, and players on Amateur Agreements from the Austin FC Academy. The team will train at the St. David's Performance Center in Austin alongside both the first team and academy teams.

Austin FC II's inaugural season in 2023 was marked by a strong defense, with the team allowing only 23 goals in 28 games, led by Damian Las' league record 12 clean sheets. The team won the MLS Next Pro championship with only one goal allowed in the playoffs.

On March 1, 2024, U.S. Soccer announced changes to the 2024 U.S. Open Cup, the national men's cup competition for the United States. These changes allowed MLS-affiliated MLS Next Pro teams to participate in the Open Cup in lieu of their MLS counterparts. Austin FC II was given a spot in the first round of the 2024 U.S. Open Cup. On March 19, Austin FC II played in their first U.S. Open Cup match against amateur side Foro SC and were eliminated in a penalty shootout. The match was tied at 2–2 after extra time and decided in the penalty shoot-out, which Austin FC II lost 3–4. Midseason, Austin had another new opportunity, playing in the MLS Next Pro invitational against, the 2023–24 Liga de Expansión MX season champions, Cancún F.C., winning their second trophy in their short history. Austin finished the 2024 MLS Next Pro season in 24th place overall, failing to qualify for the playoffs.

In 2025 Austin played in league play, due to the first team qualifying for the U.S. Open Cup. Austin finished the season with a record of 10 wins, 10 losses, and 8 draws with 3 shoot-out wins finishing in 9th place in the Western Conference, one place outside the playoffs. After the season completed, Austin announced Jason Shackell as the new coach for the second team, succeeding Brett Uttley after his three-year contract was up.

== Stadium ==
Austin FC II plays their matches at St. David's Performance Center in Austin. St. Davids' Performance Center is a $45 million training facility for Austin FC and houses Parmer Field a 1,000-seat stadium.

== Sponsorship ==
| Period | Kit manufacturer | Shirt sponsor | Sleeve sponsor | Ref. |
|---|---|---|---|---|
| 2023–present | Adidas | Yeti | Netspend | |

== Players and staff ==
=== Current roster ===
As of August 26, 2026

Note: Flags indicate national team as defined under FIFA eligibility rules; some limited exceptions apply. Players may hold more than one non-FIFA nationality.

| No. | Pos. | Nation | Player |
|---|---|---|---|
| 1 | GK | ENG | Charlie Farrar |
| 2 | DF | USA | Riley Thomas |
| 3 | DF | KOS | Dren Dobruna |
| 4 | DF | USA | Evan Watt |
| 5 | DF | FRA | Jules Bery |
| 6 | MF | CIV | Djakaria Barro |
| 7 | MF | CHI | Diego Abarca |
| 8 | MF | MEX | Adrián González |
| 9 | FW | ROU | Vlad Dănciuțiu |
| 10 | MF | ESP | Jorge Alastuey |
| 11 | FW | USA | Patrick Gryczewski |
| 12 | GK | USA | Damian Las |
| 13 | GK | USA | Erik Lauta |
| 14 | DF | POL | Daniel Cieśla |
| 16 | MF | USA | Marcel Ruszel |
| 17 | DF | TUR | Batuhan Arıcı |

| No. | Pos. | Nation | Player |
|---|---|---|---|
| 18 | MF | USA | Patrick Cayelli |
| 20 | MF | PLE | Mo Badawiya |
| 21 | FW | USA | Stefan Dobrijevic |
| 22 | FW | GHA | Ibrahima Sall |
| 23 | DF | USA | Neo Che |
| 24 | MF | USA | Kenan Hot |
| 32 | MF | USA | Micah Burton |
| 38 | MF | USA | Ervin Torres |
| 40 | GK | USA | Liam Flynn |
| 41 | GK | USA | Cooper Roney |
| 42 | DF | USA | Chuy Moreno |
| 43 | MF | USA | Landry Moncrief |
| 44 | FW | USA | Aiden Hale |
| 45 | DF | USA | Ryan Klinger |
| 46 | DF | USA | Vona Dievbiere |
| 47 | DF | USA | Sebastian Seiterie |

Loaned from Austin FC first team.
Amateur agreement

=== Staff ===
Executive
| Majority owner & CEO | Anthony Precourt |
| Chief Soccer Officer & Sporting Director | Khaled El-Ahmad |
| Technical Advisor | Nolan Sheldon |
Coaching staff
| Head coach | Jason Shackell |
| Assistant coach | (Palestine) Omar Jarun |
| Goalkeeping coach | (United States) Peter Davis |

Source: Technical Staff

== Statistics and records ==
=== Season-by-season ===
As of matches played on October 25, 2026

| Season | League | | | | | | | | | | | | Position | | | Playoffs | U.S. Open Cup | Top Scorer | |
| Season | Div | League | Pld | W | SOW | SOL | L | GF | GA | GD | Pts | PPG | Div. | Conf. | Overall | Playoffs | U.S. Open Cup | Name | Goals |
|---|---|---|---|---|---|---|---|---|---|---|---|---|---|---|---|---|---|---|---|
| 2023 | 3 | MLSNP | 28 | 12 | 4 | 5 | 7 | 40 | 23 | 17 | 49 | 1.81 | 3rd, Frontier | 4th, Western | 8th | Champions | DNP | (France) Valentin Noël | 8 |
| 2024 | 3 | MLSNP | 28 | 7 | 4 | 7 | 10 | 44 | 49 | –6 | 36 | 1.29 | 5th, Frontier | 12th, Western | 24th | DNQ | First Round | (United States) CJ Fodrey | 9 |
| 2025 | 3 | MLSNP | 28 | 10 | 3 | 5 | 10 | 35 | 36 | –1 | 41 | 1.46 | 5th, Frontier | 9th, Western | 15th | DNQ | DNP | (Spain) Jorge Alastuey | 10 |
| 2026 | 3 | MLSNP | 28 | 19 | 2 | 4 | 3 | 54 | 21 | +33 | 65 | 2.32 | 1st Frontier | 1st, Western | 1st | R2 | DNP | (Spain) Jorge Alastuey | 9 |
| Total | | | 111 | 47 | 13 | 21 | 30 | 171 | 130 | +41 | 188 | 1.69 | – | – | – | – | – | (Spain) Jorge Alastuey | 19 |

1. Top goalscorer(s) includes all goals scored in League, U.S. Open Cup, MLS Next Pro Cup Playoffs, and other competitive matches.
2. Changes made by U.S. Soccer for the 2024 U.S. Open Cup allowed MLS Next Pro teams to play. Austin FC II entered the first round of the 2024 competitions.

- SOW – Shootout Win, 2 Points
- SOL – Shootout Loss, 1 Point

=== Head coaches record ===
As of October 25, 2026

| Name | From | To | P | W | SOW | SOL | L | GF | GA | Win% |
|---|---|---|---|---|---|---|---|---|---|---|
| (United States) Brett Uttley | 2022 | 2025 | 89 | 32 | 12 | 18 | 27 | 127 | 112 | 35.96% |
| (England) Jason Shackell | 2026 | Present | 31 | 20 | 2 | 4 | 5 | 56 | 24 | 64.52% |
| – | | | 120 | 52 | 14 | 22 | 32 | 183 | 136 | 43.33% |

- SOW – Shootout win
- SOL – Shootout loss

== Honors ==
- MLS Next Pro Cup
  - Champions: 2023
- MLS Next Pro Regular Season
  - Champions: 2026
- MLS Next Pro Western Conference
  - Champions (Playoffs): 2023
- MLS Next Pro Invitational
  - Champions: 2024

== See also ==
- MLS Next Pro
