= TUDN (Mexican TV channel) =

Mexican sports television network

- Country: Mexico
- Broadcast area: Mexico and Central America

Programming
- Language: Spanish

Ownership
- Owner: Televisa Networks (TelevisaUnivision)
- Sister channels: Adrenalina Sports Network; Unicable; Tlnovelas; De Película; De Película Clásico; Distrito Comedia; BitMe; Golden; Golden Edge; Golden Premier; Telehit; Telehit Urbano; Bandamax; Las Estrellas Internacional

History
- Launched: July 22, 2009
- Former names: Televisa Deportes Network (until July 19, 2019)

Links
- Website: www.tudn.mx

TUDN, formerly Televisa Deportes Network (abbr. TDN), is a Mexican television sports channel operated by TelevisaUnivision Mexico through its specialty channels subsidiary TelevisaUnivision Networks. Launched on July 22, 2009, the channel is available on major Mexican multichannel television providers, with the separate Central American feed being also available for providers there.

The channel has ties with the U.S. sports channel of the same name, sharing some of its programming. Before July 20, 2019, when the U.S. counterpart was known as Univision Deportes Network (UDN), the channel was referred to as Univision TDN during these programs. In 2019, it was announced that TDN and UDN would jointly relaunch as TUDN—signifying a greater amount of collaboration between the two channels.

== History ==
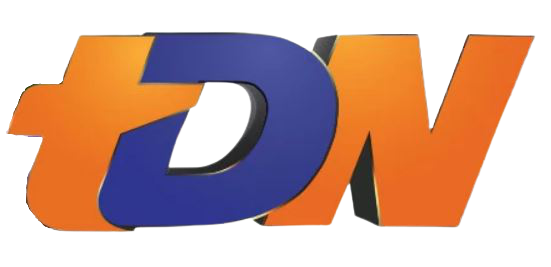
Logo used from 2012 to July 19, 2019 before the merger of Televisa Deportes Network and Univision Deportes Network to TUDN.

In May 2019, it was announced that both Televisa Deportes Network and Univision Deportes Network would be jointly rebranded as TUDN. The new branding is a combination of abbreviations TDN and UDN, but the first two letters are also pronounced as the Spanish adjective "tu" (your), allowing the name to also be read as "Tu deportes network" ("Your sports network"). TUDN will be promoted as a multi-platform brand, and there will be closer collaboration between the Mexican and American channels—allowing for expanded studio programming in the morning and daytime hours (to bolster its expansion into European soccer with its recent acquisition of UEFA rights, and existing content such as Liga MX soccer).

== Programming ==
=== Soccer ===
- Liga MX
- Campeón de Campeones
- Liga MX Femenil
- La Liga
- Categoría Primera A
- UEFA European Championship
- Copa América
- CONCACAF Nations League
- CONCACAF Gold Cup
- FIFA World Cup
- FIFA U-20 World Cup
- FIFA U-17 World Cup
- FIFA Women's World Cup
- FIFA U-20 Women's World Cup
- FIFA U-17 Women's World Cup

=== Baseball ===
- Major League Baseball
- Mexican Baseball League
- World Baseball Classic

=== Billiards ===
- Derby City Classic
- Mosconi Cup
- World Pool Championship
- World Pool Masters
- WPA World Ten-ball Championship
  - Women's World Ten-ball Championship

=== Basketball ===
- LNBP
- National Basketball Association

=== American football ===
- National Football League

=== Motor sports ===
- Formula One
- FIA Formula 2 Championship
- FIA Formula 3 Championship

=== Tennis ===
- Mexican Open

=== Mixed martial arts and boxing ===
- Top Rank
- Sabados de Corona

=== Professional wrestling ===
- Consejo Mundial de Lucha Libre

=== Multi-sport events ===
- Summer Olympic Games
- Winter Olympic Games

== Personalities ==
- (Mexico) Adolfo Peñaloza
- (Mexico) Adrián Esparza Oteo
- (Mexico) Aldo Farías
- (Mexico) Arlene Maciel
- (Mexico) Alberto "Tito" Etcheverry
- (Mexico) Alejandro de la Rosa
- (Mexico) Alfredo Tame
- (Mexico) Ana Caty Hernández
- (Mexico) Andrés Vaca
- (Mexico) Anselmo Alonso
- (Mexico) Antonio de Valdés
- (Mexico) Antonio Gómez Luna
- (Mexico) Antonio Nelli
- (Mexico) Alfredo Ruiz
- (Mexico) Andrés Maroñas
- (Mexico) Carla Mondragón
- (Mexico) Carlos Aguilar
- (Mexico) Carlos López de Silanes
- (Chile) Carlos Reinoso
- (Honduras) Carlos Pavón
- (Mexico) Carolina Morán
- (Mexico) Carolina Weigend
- (Mexico) César Martínez
- (Mexico) Christelle Patterson
- (Argentina) (Mexico) Damián "El Ruso" Zamogilny
- (Mexico) Daniel Nohra
- (Mexico) Daniel Renteria
- (Mexico) Daniel Schvartzman
- (Mexico) Daniel Velasco
- (Israel) (Mexico) David Faitelson
- (Mexico) Diana Ballinas
- (Mexico) Diego Armando Medina
- (Mexico) Diego Peña
- (Mexico) Eduardo Luna
- (Costa Rica) Eduardo Solano
- (Guatemala) Edson Aldana
- (Argentina) (Mexico) Emanuel Villa
- (Mexico) Emilio Fernando Alonso
- (Mexico) Enrique Bermúdez
- (Mexico) Enrique Borja
- (Mexico) Enrique Burak
- (Chile) Felipe Sebastián Muñóz
- (Mexico) Fernando Guerrero
- (Mexico) Fernando Jesús Torres
- (Mexico) Félix García
- (Mexico) Francisco "Kikin" Fonseca
- (Mexico) Francisco Javier González
- (Mexico) Gibrán Araige
- (Mexico) Georgina Holguín
- (Mexico) Georgina "Geo" González
- (Mexico) Guadalupe Flores Peña
- (Mexico) Guillermo Zavala
- (Mexico) Gustavo Torrero
- (France) Gwénaël Le Divenah
- (Mexico) Hugo Salcedo
- (Mexico) Humberto Valdés
- (Mexico) Iñaki Álvarez
- (Mexico) Israel Romo
- (Mexico) Javier Rojas
- (Mexico) Jonathan Orozco
- (Mexico) Jorge García Núñez
- (Mexico) Jorge "La Chiva" Gutiérrez
- (Mexico) Jorge Nava
- (Mexico) José Juan Aceves
- (Mexico) Juan Carlos Cartagena
- (Mexico) Juan Carlos Cruz
- (Mexico) Juan Carlos Díaz Murrieta
- (Colombia) Juan Carlos Osorio
- (Mexico) Juan Carlos Zarzosa
- (Mexico) Juan Carlos Zamora
- (Mexico) Juan Pablo "El Rojo" Abreu
- (Argentina) Juan Pablo Sorín
- (Mexico) Julio Ibáñez
- (Mexico) Karen Manzano
- (Mexico) Karina Herrera
- (Mexico) Leobardo Magaban
- (Mexico) Leonardo Riaño
- (Mexico) Leonora Sánchez
- (Mexico) Lili Sánchez
- (Argentina) Lola del Carril
- (Mexico) Luis Martínez-Vento
- (Mexico) Luis Reyes
- (Colombia) Manuel Barrera Baquero
- (Spain) (Mexico) Marc Crosas
- (Mexico) Marco Cancino
- (Mexico) Marco Antonio Barrera
- (Spain) (Mexico) Mariazel Olle Casals
- (Mexico) Mario Valdez
- (Mexico) María Fernanda Alonso
- (Mexico) María Fernanda Mora
- (Mexico) Mauricio "Mau" Sayún
- (Mexico) Mauricio Ymay
- (Mexico) Max Marín
- (Mexico) Miguel Ángel Linares
- (Mexico) Miguel Layún
- (Mexico) Nathalie Juárez
- (Mexico) Néstor de la Torre
- (Mexico) Noél Cardenas
- (Mexico) Oswaldo Sánchez
- (Mexico) Paco Arredondo
- (Mexico) Paco González
- (Mexico) Paco Méndez
- (Mexico) Paulina Trejo
- (Mexico) Pedro Antonio Flores
- (Mexico) Rafael Puente Jr.
- (Mexico) Ramón Aranza
- (Mexico) Ramón Ramírez
- (Mexico) Raúl Alcalá
- (Mexico) Raúl Chazari
- (Mexico) Raúl Pérez
- (Mexico) Rebeca Rubio
- (Chile) Reinaldo Navia
- (Argentina) Ricardo La Volpe
- (Mexico) Rodrigo Celorio
- (Mexico) Rubén "El Pibe" Zamora
- (Mexico) Samuel Reyes
- (Mexico) Sara Zetune
- (Mexico) Tania Rincón
- (Mexico) Vanessa Huppenkothen
- (Mexico) Víctor González
- (Mexico) Vladimir García
- (Mexico) Zaritzi Sosa

== See also ==
- Univision Deportes Network
