= Tiin =

Former Mexican pay TV channel

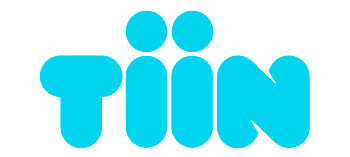
- Country: Mexico
- Broadcast area: Latin America (Note: Except Brazil)

Programming
- Language: Spanish
- Picture format: 16:9 480i/576i SDTV

Ownership
- Owner: Televisa Networks (Grupo Televisa)
- Sister channels: Las Estrellas; De Película; TL Novelas; TeleHit; Telehit Urbano; Bandamax; Canal 5*; FOROtv; Nueve

History
- Launched: September 5, 2011; 14 years ago
- Replaced: American Network
- Closed: July 14, 2019; 6 years ago
- Replaced by: BitMe

Tiin was a Mexican pay television channel owned by Televisa. It was available in Mexico and Latin America. It focused on children and teen series, soap operas and movies.

== History ==
Tiin was launched on September 5, 2011 and aired films, series, and telenovelas aimed at children and teenagers. In 2014 more animated programming began airing on the channel.

The channel ceased operations on July 14, 2019 and was replaced by BitMe.

== Former programming ==
=== Telenovelas ===
- Agujetas de color de rosa (September 3, 2018 – July 14, 2019)
- Al diablo con los guapos (September 24, 2012 – May 24, 2013)
- Alegrijes y Rebujos (September 24, 2012 – March 29, 2013; June 26, 2017 – December 30, 2017)
- Amigos x siempre (April 16, 2012 – September 21, 2012)
- Atrévete a soñar (September 5, 2011 – June 15, 2012; June 20, 2016 – June 23, 2017; January 7, 2019 – July 14, 2019)
- Amy, la niña de la mochila azul (April 1, 2013 – September 6, 2013; March 20, 2017 – August 25, 2017)
- Apuestale a la vida (February 8, 2016 – July 1, 2016)
- Atracción x4 (September 5, 2011 – January 20, 2012)
- Aventuras En El Tiempo (September 8, 2014 – January 30, 2015)
- Camaleones (July 4, 2016 – January 6, 2017)
- Carita de Ángel (October 17, 2011 – April 13, 2012; August 10, 2015 – April 8, 2016)
- Carrusel (April 11, 2016 – March 31, 2017)
- Clase 406 (January 1, 2018 – September 8, 2018)
- Cómplices Al Rescate (September 9, 2013 – March 14, 2014)
- Corazones al límite (October 1, 2018 – April 19, 2019)
- Cuento de Navidad (December 24, 2012 – January 4, 2013; December 4, 2017 – December 30, 2017)
- De pocas, pocas pulgas (February 8, 2016 – June 24, 2016)
- El abuelo y yo (January 15, 2018 – May 4, 2018)
- El diario de Daniela (April 12, 2012 – August 17, 2012; August 28, 2017 – January 12, 2018)
- El juego de la vida (May 27, 2013 – January 10, 2014)
- El niño que vino del mar (May 27, 2013 – October 4, 2013)
- Gotita de amor (October 17, 2011 – February 27, 2012)
- Lola, érase una vez (March 18, 2014 – January 23, 2015)
- Luna Roja (January 23, 2012 – September 18, 2012)
- María Belén (June 27, 2016 – October 28, 2016)
- Misión S.O.S (January 21, 2013 – July 12, 2013)
- Miss XV (August 24, 2015 – February 5, 2016; June 19, 2017 – December 1, 2017; January 7, 2019 – June 24, 2019)
- Muchachitas como tú (December 4, 2017 – May 18, 2018)
- Niní (March 12, 2012 – September 21, 2012)
- Pablo y Andrea (October 31, 2016 – March 17, 2017)
- Patito Feo (July 15, 2013 – September 5, 2014)
- Primer amor, a mil por hora (January 1, 2018 – May 4, 2018)
- Rebelde (January 23, 2012 – September 27, 2013; January 9, 2017 – July 20, 2018)
- Rayito de luz (November 6, 2017 – December 1, 2017)
- Sueña Conmigo (February 2, 2015 – August 21, 2015)
- Sueños y caramelos (January 26, 2015 – August 7, 2015)
- Una luz en el camino (August 20, 2012 – December 21, 2012)
- ¡Vivan los niños! (June 18, 2012 – January 18, 2013; April 3, 2017 – November 3, 2017)

=== Series ===
- Cámara Loca (2012–2017)
- Chespirito (December 17, 2018 – July 14, 2019)
- El campamento de Bindi (2013–2016)
- El Chapulín Colorado (January 7, 2019 – July 14, 2019)
- El Chavo del Ocho (December 2, 2013 – January 1, 2019)
- Gladiadores UK (2012–2017)
- El Mundo de Beakman (2014–2016)
- La CQ (2015 – July 14, 2019)
- La Maga (2015)
- The Haunting Hour: La Serie (2013 – 2015; 2017 – 2018)

=== Anime ===
- Shin Chan (November 10, 2014 – July 14, 2019)

=== Talk/reality shows ===
- Atraviesa el Muro (2013–2016)
- Chistiin (2012; 2018–2019)
- Los 15 Que Soñé Pop (2011–2014)
- Q-Riosos (September 5, 2011 – June 18, 2016)
- Tiin Magazine (November 23, 2014 – June 4, 2016)
- Top Tiin (August 20, 2012 – June 5, 2016)

=== Animated ===
- 99
- El Chapulín Colorado Animado (August 3, 2015 – July 14, 2019)
- El Chavo Animado (September 5, 2011 – July 14, 2019)
- El Hombre Araña: La Serie
- Hombres de Negro: La Serie (2013–2015)
- Las aventuras de Jackie Chan (2013–2015)
- Max Steel (2012–2015)
- Los Thunderbirds (2017)
