= American Network =

Defunct Mexican television network

- Type: Pay television channel
- Country: Mexico
- Broadcast area: Latin America (Note: Except Brazil)

Programming
- Language: English
- Picture format: 16:9 480i/576i SDTV

Ownership
- Owner: Televisa
- Sister channels: Las Estrellas; De Película; TL Novelas; TeleHit; Telehit Urbano; Bandamax; Canal 5*; Nueve

History
- Launched: October 1, 2002; 24 years ago
- Closed: September 5, 2011; 15 years ago
- Replaced by: Tiin

American Network was a cable/satellite television network owned by Televisa. Established in 2002, the channel broadcast throughout Mexico, Guatemala, and El Salvador featuring English language programs originating from the United States. Most of the shows were CBS Television Studios-owned or distributed programming. American Network's coverage included all CBS News shows. Other shows on its schedule included programming from CBS Sports and Food Network.

The network ran an announcement, from August 22, 2011, that it would end its broadcast on September 5, 2011. It was replaced by Tiin, a Mexican Spanish-language network oriented to teenagers and kids.
