= Austin FC =

American professional soccer club based in Austin, Texas

- Nicknames: The Verde and Black; Los Verdes; El Tree
- Founded: October 12, 2018; 8 years ago
- Stadium: Q2 Stadium; Austin, Texas
- Capacity: 20,738
- Owner: Two Oak Ventures
- Chairman: Anthony Precourt
- Head coach: Davy Arnaud (interim)
- League: Major League Soccer
- 2026: Western Conference: 14th Overall: 26th Playoffs: Did not qualify
- Website: austinfc.com
Home colors	Away colors	Third colors

Austin FC is an American professional soccer club based in Austin, Texas. The club competes in Major League Soccer (MLS) as a member of the Western Conference. Founded in 2018, the club began play in the 2021 season. Their home stadium is Q2 Stadium in north Austin. They are the first major professional sports league team to play in the Texas capital, which, prior to 2021, was the largest city in the United States without such a team.

== History ==
Austin FC is the first top-division major professional sports team in the Austin area, a market that had been previously overlooked by the major professional sports leagues. The city's previous experience with professional soccer includes the Austin Aztex, founded in 2008, but later relocated to Orlando in October 2010 and eventually became MLS side Orlando City SC; the 2011 reincarnation of the Austin Aztex, which went on indefinite hiatus following the 2015 Memorial Day floods washing out their venue at House Park; and Austin Bold, which played in the second-division USL Championship at Circuit of the Americas from 2019 to 2021.

In October 2017, Columbus Crew operator Precourt Sports Ventures announced their intention to move the group's MLS franchise rights to Austin for the 2019 MLS season.

After several sessions, the Austin City Council, by a 7–4 vote during a special session on August 15, 2018, granted the City Manager the authority to negotiate and execute a lease for a stadium with Precourt Sports Ventures.

On August 22, 2018, the group unveiled the name and badge for the club at the North Door on Austin's east side. The crest was designed by local Austin brand studio The Butler Bros, who explained the badge as including the signature color "Bright Verde" to "project the vibrancy and creative energy of Austin", intertwined oaks that "stand for the bond between Club and City", and the four roots uniting all compass directions of Austin, North, East, South, and West.

In October 2018, an Ohio-based group which includes Jimmy and Dee Haslam, owners of the National Football League's Cleveland Browns, and Columbus-based physician and businessman Pete Edwards, announced their intentions to acquire Columbus Crew to keep the team from moving. MLS officials stated that if the transfer of the Crew's operating rights were successful, Austin FC would be an expansion team operated by Precourt to begin play by 2021.

On December 19, 2018, Precourt Sports Ventures and the City of Austin reached a financing agreement for a new soccer-specific stadium to be constructed at McKalla Place, which was projected to open by early 2021. Nine days after finalizing the stadium deal, Precourt Sports Ventures reached an agreement in principle to transfer the operating rights of the Columbus Crew to the Haslam and Edwards families in January 2019.

On January 15, 2019, Austin FC was officially announced as an MLS club with a 2021 start date. In July 2019, the ownership group was renamed to Two Oak Ventures and later expanded to include local celebrities and businesspeople.

=== First seasons ===
Austin FC hired Josh Wolff as their first head coach in July 2019 and hired Claudio Reyna as the club's Sporting Director in November of the same year. The two were teammates for the United States from 1999 to 2006.

In July 2020, Austin signed their first player, Rodney Redes.

Before the start of their inaugural season, Alexander Ring was named the first club captain.

Austin FC played their first MLS match against LAFC at Banc of California Stadium on April 17, 2021, losing 0–2. The club secured its first victory the following week against the Colorado Rapids, winning 3–1. Diego Fagúndez scored the club's first goal and the following two were scored by the club's first Designated Player, Cecilio Dominguez. Their home opener was held on June 19, 2021, against the San Jose Earthquakes, a match which ended 0-0. The team secured its first home victory on July 1, 2021, defeating the Portland Timbers 4–1. Jon Gallagher scored the team's first home goal and the first MLS goal at Q2 Stadium.

Austin FC signed Sebastián Driussi, on July 29, 2021, from Zenit Saint Petersburg for a $7 million transfer fee. He became the first player to score 10, 20, and 30 career goals for the club at various points in 2022 and was named the club's first All-Star that season. Driussi signed an extension through 2025 with a 2026 option and became the second captain for the club.

On September 9, 2021, Owen Wolff signed a homegrown player contract with Major League Soccer side Austin FC, signing a deal through to 2025 and becoming the club's first homegrown player signing.

In 2022, Austin FC started the season with an MLS record 10 goals in their first two matches. They lost 2–1 in their first cup match in the third round of the 2022 U.S. Open Cup against San Antonio on April 20; Fagundez scored the club's first Open Cup goal. On July 16, they won the Division 1 Copa Tejas, the first trophy in franchise history. Austin FC clinched their first playoff berth during a 3-0 home win against Real Salt Lake where Moussa Djitte scored the first hat trick in club history despite entering the game as a substitute. Austin won their first MLS playoff game at home over Real Salt Lake, prevailing 3–1 in a penalty shootout after a 2–2 score following extra time. Austin advanced to the Western Conference Final after defeating FC Dallas, but lost to LAFC 3-0 the following week.

In August 2022, the club announced they would debut a reserves team in MLS Next Pro in 2023, Austin FC II.

In early January 2023 news came out that Claudio Reyna and his wife had been involved in the release of personal information about the United States men's national soccer team coach Gregg Berhalter in response to their son's decreased play-time in the 2022 FIFA World Cup. As a result, Claudio Reyna resigned as the Sporting Director, but stayed with Austin FC as a Technical Advisor. Josh Wolff was given the responsibilities of running the sporting department, in addition to coaching the team. In April 2023, it was noted that Claudio Reyna was no longer listed as a technical advisor on the Austin FC website. In June 2023 it was announced that Rodolfo Borrell was taking over the role of Sporting Director for Austin FC. Rodolfo Borrell was a former assistant coach to Pep Guardiola at English side Manchester City.

Based on their 2022 finish, Austin FC qualified for the 2023 CONCACAF Champions League, their first continental competition. They played Violette AC from Haiti and lost 3–2 on aggregate. In May 2023, Austin FC ended their 2023 U.S. Open Cup run with a 2–0 loss to the Chicago Fire at home. Austin FC also competed in their first regional competition at the 2023 Leagues Cup and lost their first game 3-1 against Mazatlán. They later lost to FC Juárez 3-1, failing to advance to the round of 16.

After failing to qualify for the 2023 MLS Cup Playoffs, Austin FC announced some changes to the front office. On October 8, 2023, Rodolfo Borrell announced that both Sean Rubio and Manuel Junco were no longer with Austin FC and Borrell would be overseeing scouting and player personnel, which he started by hiring five new scouts to be located in Europe and South America. Borrell also announced that Josh Wolff would remain on as the Austin FC coach despite the disappointing 2023 results. On October 6, 2024, Austin FC announced that Josh Wolff had been released from his head coach position after the team failed to make the playoffs for the second year in a row.

In preparation for the 2025 season, Austin FC announced the hiring of Nico Estévez as the new head coach. Estévez joined the team after the November 2024 FIFA window. In Estévez's first season, Austin advanced to the 2025 U.S. Open Cup final, the first tournament final in club history. The club hosted the final at Q2 Stadium and lost 1–2 to Nashville SC; Austin's lone goal was scored by Uzuni at the close of the first half. Austin qualified for the first round of the 2025 MLS Cup playoffs, being matched against LAFC. Austin FC was eliminated after losing both round one playoff games, ending their 2026 season.

Austin started the 2026 with multiple starters injured, but had worked to fill the losses with signings of five new players, in an effort to strengthen their 2025 final standings. After 14 matches, Austin was in 13th in the Western Conference. Due to their poor showing, including being eliminated from the U.S. Open Cup by USL side Louisville City FC, both Rodolfo Borrell and Nico Estévez were released one game before the 60 day FIFA World Cup break.

On June 8, 2026, Austin FC announced Jim Curtin as the club's next head coach following the 2026 season.

== Stadium ==
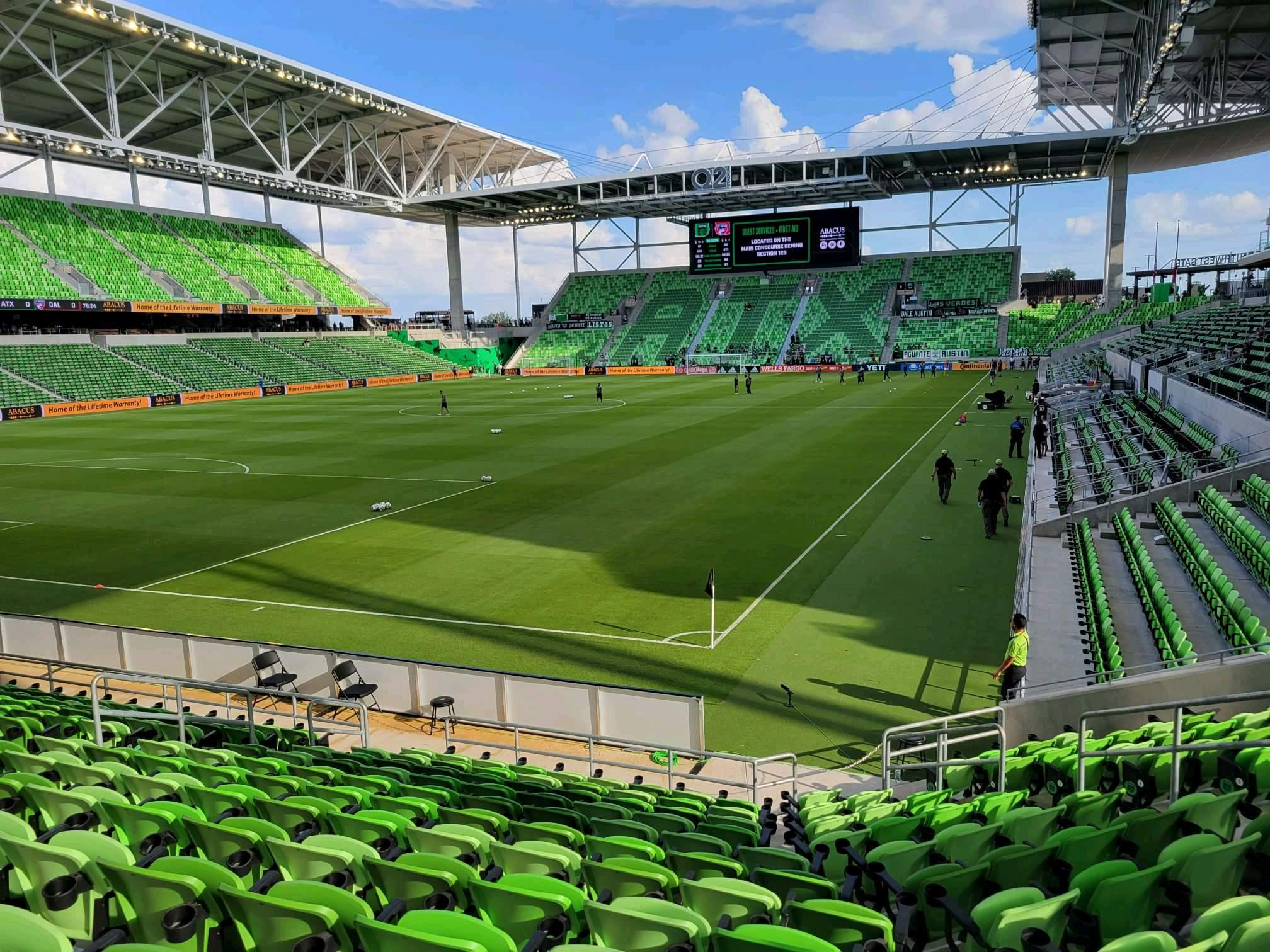
Q2 Stadium in 2021

Austin FC are the operators of a newly built stadium at McKalla Place. The stadium is near The Domain, a large shopping center complex. The stadium, built on public land and owned by the City of Austin, was privately financed by Two Oak Ventures. The lease was signed on December 19, 2018. The stadium seats 20,738 fielded its first Austin FC game on June 19, 2021.

The club announced plans for a $45 million, privately funded training facility, the St. David's Performance Center, on November 13, 2019. The performance center, located in the Parmer Pond development in northeast Austin, will have four full-size soccer fields, one with a 1,000 capacity seating section, in addition to a 30,000 square foot indoor facility.

In 2022, the Capital Metropolitan Transportation Authority started construction on a commuter rail station for the Red Line, McKalla station. McKalla station opened and began service on February 24, 2024, for Austin FC's first match of the 2024 season.

== Club culture ==
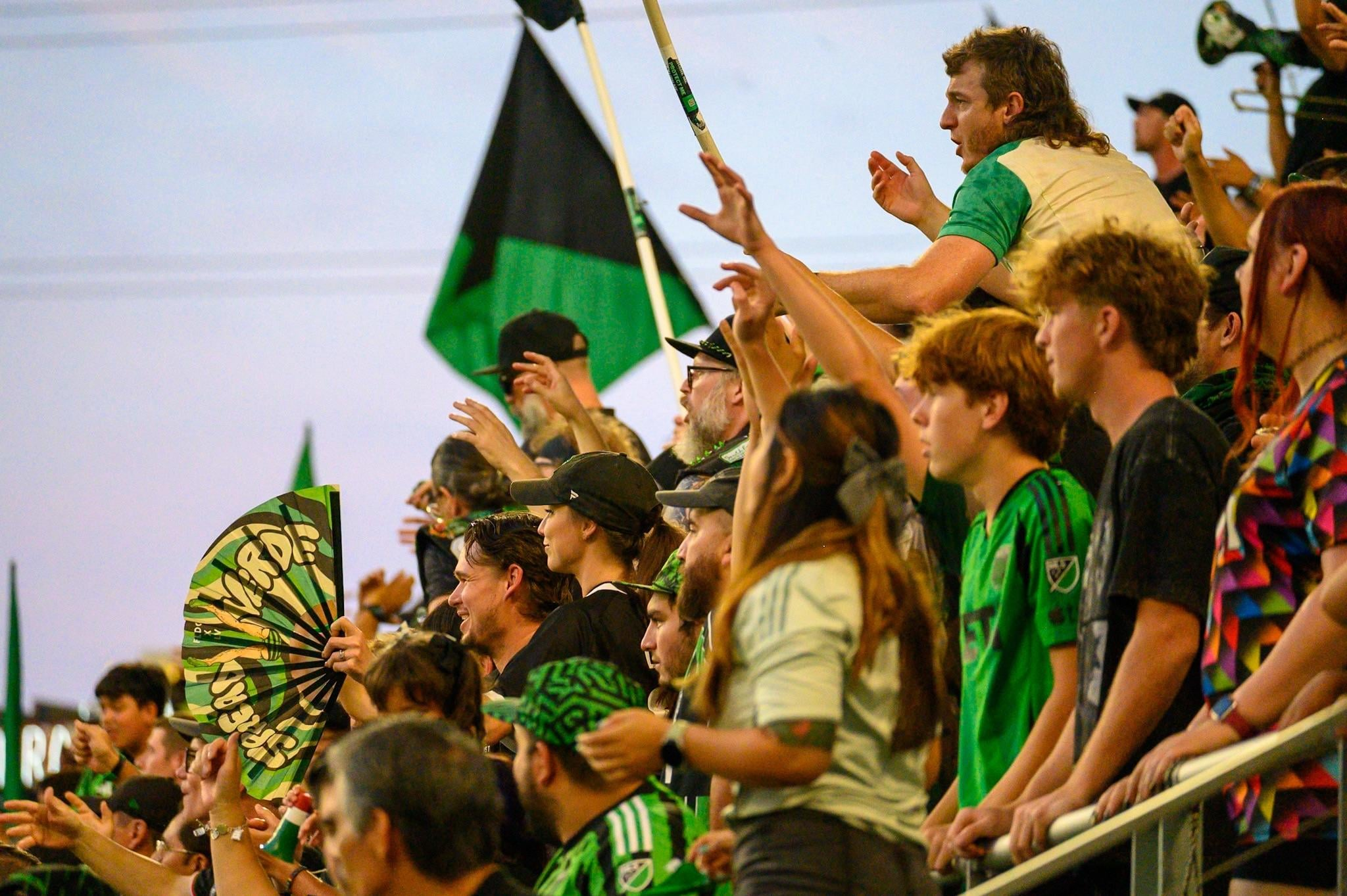
Supporters of Austin FC in 2025

Austin FC has several supporters' groups, Austin Anthem, Los Verdes, the La Murga de Austin band, Fighting Leslies DC, and a group from New Braunfels, Oak Army New Braunfels.

The club colors are bright green (stylized by the club as "verde," the Spanish word for the color) and black. The team's color scheme has been frequently highlighted in team promotions and at Q2 Stadium, with green lights flashing after each Austin goal.

Austin FC have sold out all 54 home games since their debut at Q2, which is currently the longest active streak in MLS.

Austin FC added an armadillo jocktag to the team's uniform in February 2024, after striking a deal with Eddie Wilson, the keeper of the Armadillo World Headquarters cultural flame. Austin FC President Andy Loughnane said it was important to pay homage to Austin's "creative and vibrant spirit". The relaunch of the Armadillo was celebrated at the Austin FC jersey launch party, with Asleep at the Wheel frontman, Ray Benson.

== Sponsorship ==
Period	Kit manufacturer	Shirt sponsor	Sleeve sponsor	Ref.
2021–2024	Adidas	Yeti	Netspend	
2025–present	Adidas	Yeti	Siete Foods	

== Broadcasting ==
For the 2021 and 2022 seasons, Nexstar Media Group served as the team's broadcast partner. The majority of games appeared on KNVA, with select matches also appearing on KXAN and KBVO. Adrian Healey served as the play-by-play announcer, while Michael Lahoud joined in as a color analyst. In April 2021, Austin FC reached a deal with Univision as its Spanish broadcast partner. KAKW and KTFO broadcast each regionally televised match in Spanish. From 2023, every Austin FC match is available via MLS Season Pass on the Apple TV app.

English-language radio rights are held by Alt 97.5 FM, with Lincoln Rose on the call. KLQB serves as Austin FC's flagship Spanish radio station.

== Ownership and management ==
Austin FC is owned by Two Oak Ventures, formerly known as Precourt Sports Ventures, which is led by CEO Anthony Precourt. Other investing partners in Two Oak Ventures include actor Matthew McConaughey, local entrepreneur Eduardo Margain, former Dell executive Marius Haas, energy entrepreneur Bryan Sheffield, and real estate businessman David Kahn.

== Affiliates and academy ==
=== Affiliates ===
In 2022, Austin FC launched their reserve team, Austin FC II, which began play in 2023 as part of MLS Next Pro's Western Conference. They currently play at Parmer Field at the St. David's Performance Center. The current coach is Jason Shackell.

On May 17, 2023, David Rodríguez became the first Austin FC II player to sign a short-term contract with the first team. Two months later, Valentin Noël became the first Austin FC II player to appear in a first team match, coming on in the 90th minute of a Leagues Cup match.

=== Academy ===
Austin FC announced the first professional soccer academy in Austin, TX would begin play in August 2019 as part of the U.S. Soccer Development Academy program at the U–14 level. The Austin FC Academy was the first fully funded academy in central Texas. Tyson Wahl took on the academy's general manager role and helped assemble the first U–14 team. Junro Narita was named as the initial coach of the U–14 team. In January 2020, Austin FC announced that they had hired Juan Delgado as their Academy Technical Director. In the fall of 2020, Austin FC Academy became part of MLS Next.

In April 2022, Austin FC Academy had their first player called up for a U.S. Youth National Team as Ervin Torres was called up to the United States U-15 BNT.

In August 2022, Austin FC Academy sent coaches and players to the Netherlands to participate in training sessions with PSV Eindhoven as part of the PSV Partnership.

On January 23, 2023, Austin FC II announced the signing of Anthony De Anda, the first Austin FC Academy player to sign a professional contract. Two months later, Austin FC II announced the signing of five academy players on amateur agreements, allowing them to compete with the team.

On January 10, 2024, Austin FC announced they had signed Burton as a homegrown player on a four-year contract, with an optional additional year. Burton is the first Academy product to sign a professional contract with the first team.

== Players and staff ==
=== Roster ===
As of November 10, 2026

Note: Flags indicate national team as defined under FIFA eligibility rules; some limited exceptions apply. Players may hold more than one non-FIFA nationality.

No.	Pos.	Nation	Player
1	GK	USA	Brad Stuver (captain)
3	DF	DEN	Mikkel Desler
5	DF	UKR	Oleksandr Svatok
9	FW	USA	Brandon Vázquez (DP)
10	FW	ALB	Myrto Uzuni (DP)
11	FW	URU	Facundo Torres (DP)
12	GK	USA	Damian Las (HG)
14	MF	SWE	Besard Šabović
15	DF	JAM	Jon Bell
17	DF	IRL	Jon Gallagher

No.	Pos.	Nation	Player
21	FW	USA	Christian Ramirez
22	DF	USA	Chris Applewhite (on loan from Nashville SC)
23	DF	SLO	Žan Kolmanič
24	MF	ESP	Jorge Alastuey
29	DF	BRA	Guilherme Biro
30	DF	HON	Joseph Rosales
32	MF	USA	Micah Burton (HG)
35	DF	SRB	Mateja Đorđević (U22)
38	MF	USA	Ervin Torres (HG)
77	FW	POL	Przemysław Płacheta

=== Out on loan ===
Note: Flags indicate national team as defined under FIFA eligibility rules; some limited exceptions apply. Players may hold more than one non-FIFA nationality.

No.	Pos.	Nation	Player
19	FW	USA	CJ Fodrey (on loan to Falkirk)
20	MF	ARG	Nicolás Dubersarsky (U22; on loan to Tigre)

=== Technical ===
Executive
Majority owner & CEO	Anthony Precourt
Chief Soccer Officer & Sporting director	Khaled El-Ahmad
Director of Domestic Scouting and Recruitment	Aguilar Azón
Director of Player Personnel	John Turner
Technical Advisor	Nolan Sheldon
Coaching Staff
Head coach	(United States) Davy Arnaud (interim)
Assistant coach	Alberto González
Assistant coach	Terry Boss
Goalkeeper coach	Fabio Hernandez
Field analyst coach	Albert Ballesteros

Source: Technical staff

==== Head coach history ====
Coach	Tenure
(United States) Josh Wolff	July 23, 2019 – October 6, 2024
(United States) Davy Arnaud (interim)	October 6, 2024 – November 20, 2024
(Spain) Nico Estévez	November 20, 2024 – May 18, 2026
(United States) Davy Arnaud (interim)	May 18, 2026

== Honors ==
=== Domestic ===
- U.S. Open Cup
  - Runners-up (1): 2025
- Western Conference (playoffs)
  - Runners-up (1): 2022
- Western Conference (Regular Season)
  - Runners-up (1): 2022

=== State ===
- Copa Tejas (Division 1)
  - Champions (2): 2022, 2023
  - Runners-up (1): 2024

== Records ==
=== Seasons ===
As of November 7, 2026

Season	League									Position		Playoffs	USOC	Continental		Average attendance (Note: Avg. attendance only includes statistics from regular season matches.)	Top goalscorer(s) (Note: Top goalscorer(s) includes all goals scored in the regular season, MLS Cup Playoffs, U.S. Open Cup, Leagues Cup, CONCACAF Champions League, FIFA Club World Cup, and other competitive matches.)	
Season	Pld	W	L	D	GF	GA	GD	Pts	PPG	Conf.	Overall	Playoffs	USOC	CCL	LC	Average attendance	Name(s)	Goals
2021	34	9	21	4	35	56	–21	31	0.91	12th	24th	DNQ	NH	–	–	20,738	(Paraguay) Cecilio Dominguez (Uruguay) Diego Fagundez	7
2022	34	16	10	8	65	49	+16	56	1.65	2nd	4th	SF	R3	DNQ	NH	20,738	(Argentina) Sebastián Driussi	25
2023	34	10	15	9	49	55	–6	39	1.15	12th	25th	DNQ	R16	R16	GS	20,738	(Argentina) Sebastián Driussi	13
2024	34	11	14	9	39	48	–9	42	1.24	10th	18th	DNQ	DNP (Note: Changes made by U.S. Soccer for the 2024 U.S. Open Cup allowed MLS Next Pro teams to play. Austin FC II entered the first round of the 2024 U.S. Open Cup.)	DNQ	R32	20,738	(Colombia) Jáder Obrian (Argentina) Sebastián Driussi	8
2025	34	13	13	8	37	45	–8	47	1.28	6th	15th	R1	RU	DNQ	DNQ (Note: CONCACAF changed format for the 2025 Leagues Cup to feature only 18 MLS clubs. Based on these changes Austin FC did not qualify for the 2025 Leagues Cup.)	20,738	(United States) Brandon Vázquez (Albania) Myrto Uzuni	9
2026	34	8	16	10	42	65	–23	34	1.00	14th	26th	DNQ	R32	DNQ	QF	20,738	(Albania) Myrto Uzuni	13
Total	204	67	89	48	267	317	–52	249	1.22	–	–	–	–	–	–	–	(Argentina) Sebastián Driussi	51

== See also ==
- Copa Tejas — Intrastate rivalry with FC Dallas and Houston Dynamo
