= KTFO =

KTFO may refer to:

- KTFO-CD, a low-power television station (channel 36, virtual 31) licensed to Austin, Texas, United States
- KMYT-TV, a television station (channel 41) licensed to Tulsa, Oklahoma, United States, formerly known as KTFO-TV
- KTFO Fight Gear, a combat sports brand specializing combat sports gear, clothing, and fighter sponsorships.
