= Distrito Comedia =

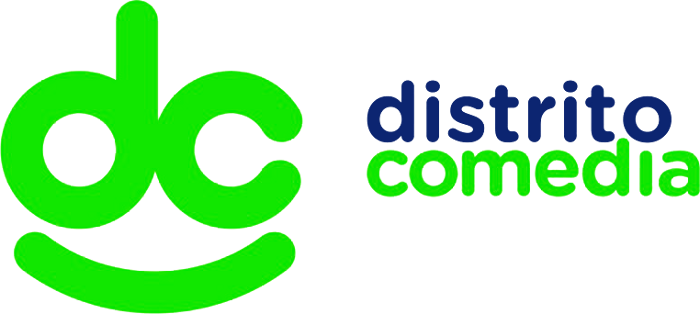
- Country: Mexico
- Broadcast area: Latin America

Programming
- Language: Spanish
- Picture format: HDTV 1080i (downscaled to 480i/576i for the SD feed)

Ownership
- Owner: Televisa Networks (TelevisaUnivision)
- Sister channels: Las Estrellas; FOROtv; Telehit; Bandamax; De Pelicula; De Película Clásico

History
- Launched: July 5, 2007; 19 years ago
- Former names: Clásico TV (2007–2012)

Links
- Website: www.distritocomedia.com

Distrito Comedia (Comedy District) is a Mexican cable/satellite television network. The channel broadcast classic comedy shows (from the 1970s to 1990s), contemporary comedy shows (2000s) and original comedy shows (2010s).

Distrito Comedia (launched October 1, 2012) broadcast only Mexican comedy shows and sitcoms from TelevisaUnivision Mexico. Distrito Comedia replaced Clásico TV on (May 7, 2007 – October 1, 2012).

== Current programming ==
- Al Derecho y al Derbez (1993–1995)
- Cero en Conducta (1999–2003)
- La Hora Pico (2000–2007)
- Diseñador Ambos Sexos (2001)
- Güereja de mi Vida (2001–2002)
- XHDRBZ (2002–2004)
- La Familia P.Luche (2002–2004 / 2007 / 2012)
- La Parodia (2002–2007)
- Karaoke, Canta y no te Rajes (2013–2014)
- Puedes con 100 (2013–2015)
- El Guantazo (2013–2014)
- Turnocturno (2013–2015)
- Zona Ruda (2014–2015)
- Un Tal Show (2014)
- Quién se Roba el Show (2014)
- Paranoia Total (2015)
- La Casa de la Risa (2003–2005)
- La Escuelita VIP (2004)
- El Privilegio de Mandar (2005–2006)
- Incógnito (2005–2008)
- Vecinos (2005–2008)
- ¡Qué Madre tan Padre! (2006)
- El Chavo Animado (2006–2014)
- Amor Mío (2006–2008)
- Una Familia de Diez (2007)
- María de Todos los Ángeles (2009 / 2013)
- Estrella2 (2012 – present)
- STANDparados (2013 – present)
- Nosotros Los Guapos (2016–2017; 2019)
- Vas con Todo (2014 / 2020)
- Me Caigo de Risa (2014–2017, 2018, 2019 y 2020)

== Former programming ==
- Festival del Humor (1997–2007)
- Con Ganas (1998)
- Ay María qué puntería (1997–1998)
- La Güereja y algo Más (1998–1999)
- Va de Nuez en Cuando (1999–2000)
- ¿Qué nos pasa? (1985–1988 / 1998–2000)
- Parodiando (2012–2013)
- María de todos los Ángeles (2009 / 2013)
- Cachún cachún ra ra! (1981–1987)
- Diversión Desconocida (1999)
- Nosotros los Gómez (1987–1989)
- Humor es... los Comediantes (1999–2001)
- Hoy es para Amar (2013–2014)
- Bajo el mismo Techo (2005)
- Hospital el Paisa (2004)
- Hogar Dulce Hogar (1974–1984)
- ¡Anabel! (1988–1996)
- Dr. Cándido Pérez (1987–1993)
- Derbez en Cuando (1998–1999)
- El show de Joe y Freddiw (2011–2016)
- Furcio (2000–2002)
- Diseñador Ambos Sexos (2001)
- Los Polivoces (1971–1973)
- Chiquilladas (1982–1993)
- Papá Soltero (1987–1994)
- Objetos Perdidos (2007)
- La Jaula (2003–2004)
- La Carabina de Ambrosio (1978–1987)
- Los Perplejos (2005–2006)
- Par de Ases (2005)
- El Chavo del Ocho (1972–1980)
- El Chapulín Colorado (1973–1979)
- Chespirito (1971–1973 / 1980–1995)
