= KLJA =

Spanish adult contemporary radio station in Georgetown, Texas

Coordinates: 30.623°N 97.643°W

- Georgetown, Texas; United States
- Broadcast area: Austin, Texas
- Frequency: 107.7 MHz (HD Radio)
- Branding: Amor 107.7

Programming
- Language: Spanish
- Format: Adult contemporary

Ownership
- Owner: Uforia Audio Network; (Univision Radio Illinois, Inc.)
- Sister stations: KLQB; KAKW-DT; KTFO-CD; KXLK-CD

History
- Founded: March 25, 1989
- First air date: October 31, 1991; 34 years ago
- Former call signs: KJWL (1989–1991, CP); KNNC (1991–1997); KAHK (1997–2001); KTND (2001–2003); KINV (2003–2008); KHZS (2008–2009)
- Call sign meaning: "La Jefa" (former branding)

Technical information
- Licensing authority: FCC
- Facility ID: 55475
- Class: C3
- ERP: 10,500 watts
- HAAT: 154.8 meters (508 ft)

Links
- Public license information: Public file; LMS
- Website: www.univision.com/radio/austin-klja-fm/amor-107-7

KLJA (107.7 FM) is a radio station broadcasting a Spanish AC format. Licensed to Georgetown, Texas, United States, it serves the Austin area. KLJA is owned by TelevisaUnivision. It is a part of TelevisaUnivision's Uforia Audio Network brand. The station has a transmitter in Georgetown and has studios along MoPac Expressway in Northwest Austin.

== History ==
=== Sign-on, Austin's original alternative ===
The station signed on the air in October 1991, as "107.7 K-Nack" KNNC, giving Austin its first commercial Alternative/Modern Rock-formatted station under the ownership of Rees-Slaymaker Radio Partnership. The station, always hampered by its relatively small 3 kW signal broadcasting from the far northeastern corner of the market, faced competition in 1995, when Sinclair Telecable launched 101X on its Austin rimshot, KROX-FM. At the time, KROX was licensed to Giddings and, while it broadcast with a full 100 kilowatts, its tower was located between Bastrop and La Grange and only provided listenable coverage to southeastern portions of the Austin market. In 1997, Sinclair (a Virginia-based radio operator, not to be confused with Sinclair Broadcasting) leased KNNC and began simulcasting 101X on 107.7 to supplement KROX's then-weak northern metro signal.

=== Sale to Simmons, flip to classic hits ===
Later in 1997, Rees-Slaymaker sold KNNC to Utah-based Simmons Media Group, who ended the 101X simulcast and flipped 107.7 to a 70s-based Classic Hits format as "107.7 the Hawk" KAHK. As the 80s Hits format was picking up steam nationally in the early 2000s, Simmons flipped KAHK to an 80s-based format as "107.7 the End, Austin's 80s Channel" KTND in February 2001. After only about a year, KTND shifted to modern rock, placing the station back into competition with KROX (which by that time had relicensed to Buda and upgraded its facilities to fully cover the Austin market).

=== Switch to Spanish ===
Simmons began divesting stations outside of its home market of Salt Lake City in 2003, with KTND being sold to Univision, along with their entire Albuquerque station cluster. Univision's purchase of the station was their entry into the Austin radio market, and was preceded by the purchase of TV station KAKW in 2002. Upon taking control of the station in April 2003, Univision launched regional Mexican "La Invasora" on the station, which was recalled KINV. Univision changed formats on the station again in 2005, and KINV became Latin classic hits "Recuerdo 107.7". In 2008, following the demise of the Latin pop format on what was then KXXS (98.9), KINV flipped to Latin pop as "Hitz 107.7" KHZS. Just shy of Hitz 107.7's first birthday, KHZS returned to regional Mexican format as "La Jefa" on October 16, 2009. On September 11, 2013, La Jefa moved to sister station KLQB (104.3) and KLJA shifted to a younger-skewing version of the regional Mexican format as "El Sancho 107.7", "El Sancho"—translating colloquially to "the other one"—has a double meaning: an "alternative" (as in: to KLQB's programming) or "the other man" (as in: a "mister"). This would later be dropped in favor of Univision's "Más Variedad" Spanish adult hits format. On February 6, 2018, Univision dropped "Más Variedad" and switched it to Spanish AC as "Amor 107.7".
