= El Chavo Animado =

Mexican animated series based on El Chavo del Ocho

- Genre: Comedy; Slapstick; Animated sitcom
- Created by: Roberto Gómez Bolaños
- Based on: El Chavo del Ocho by Roberto Gómez Bolaños
- Developed by: Roberto Gómez Bolaños
- Voices of: Jesús Guzmán; Sebastián Llapur; Mario Castañeda; Erica Edwards; Moisés Suárez Aldana; Erika Mireles; Maggie Vera; Leonardo García; Julieta Rivera
- Theme music composer: Herrera Pérez Adrián; Alejo Flores Luis Fernando
- Opening theme: "El Chavo"
- Ending theme: "El Chavo"
- Country of origin: Mexico
- Original language: Spanish
- No. of seasons: 7
- No. of episodes: 135

Production
- Executive producers: Roberto Gómez Bolaños (†); Roberto Gómez Fernández; Fernando de Fuentes; José C. García de Letona
- Running time: 22 minutes
- Production companies: Ánima Estudios; Televisa

Original release
- Network: Canal 5 Univision
- Release: October 21, 2006 – June 6, 2014

Related
- El Chavo del Ocho (original series)

El Chavo Animado (El Chavo: The Animated Series in English) is a Mexican animated series based on the live action television series El Chavo del Ocho, created by Roberto Gómez Bolaños, produced by Televisa and Ánima Estudios. It aired on Canal 5, and repeats were also shown on Las Estrellas and Cartoon Network Latin America. 135 episodes aired between October 21, 2006 and June 6, 2014.

After several years of successful repeats of the original series, on October 21, 2006 Televisa launched in Mexico and the rest of Latin America an animated version of the program by Ánima Estudios to capitalise on the original series' popularity. With the series, Televisa began a marketing campaign which included merchandise tie-ins. For the series' launch event, a set was built (imitating the computerised background) on which the animation was said. Many elements of the original series, including most of the original stories, were included in the animated series.

El Chavo Animado also aired in English via Kabillion's on-demand service in the United States. Although it was part of the video-on-demand service, the series did not appear on the Kabillion website until the site's April 2012 relaunch. The series is currently airing on BitMe and Distrito Comedia as of 2020, and from 2016 to 2017, and again from 2022 to 2024, it aired on Univision and Galavisión alongside El Chapulín Colorado Animado.

== Premise ==
=== Background ===
The cartoon depicts the children to scale, compared to the live-action series where the children were played by adults. This was not the first attempt to animate the show's characters; claymation sequences were created for the original-series credits during the late 1970s, and 2D animations were used for the credits of Chespirito (the program which succeeded El Chavo and its sister series, El Chapulín Colorado).

=== Synopsis ===
Based on the series El Chavo del Ocho, the cartoon is the adventures of El Chavo, a poor boy, and his gang, who live in a village in Mexico (the Brazilian dubbing, however, moved the village's location to Brazil and in Kabillion's dub, to New York City). In the first season, all episodes of the series are remakes of episodes from the original series. With the absence of La Chilindrina, Ñoño, Popis and Quico (in school episodes) partially replace her role in most episodes. From the second season, the cartoon began to have episodes with original stories.

=== Characters ===
El Chavo Animado features all the characters of the original series, with the exception of La Chilindrina and Doña Nieves due to legal ownership disputes between María Antonieta de las Nieves and Roberto Gómez Bolaños. The series stars El Chavo, a poor boy, along with his gang, which consists of Quico, the exhibitionist and protected son of Doña Florinda, and Ñoño, an obese boy which is Señor Barriga's son.

== Cast ==
=== Spanish ===
- Jesús Guzmán as El Chavo del 8 and Godínez
- Sebastián Llapur as Quico and Señor Barriga (seasons 5–7)
- Mario Castañeda as Don Ramón and Ñoño
- Erica Edwards as Doña Florinda and La Popis
- Juan Carlos Tinoco (seasons 1–2) and Moisés Suárez Aldana (seasons 3–7) as Professor Jirafales
- Erika Mireles as Doña Clotilde (La Bruja del 71)
- Víctor Delgado (seasons 1–5) as Señor Barriga
- Maggie Vera as Paty
- Leonardo García (seasons 1–5) and Héctor Miranda (seasons 6–7) as Jaimito, el cartero
- Julieta Rivera as Gloria

=== English ===
- Mona Marshall as Chavo and Miss Pinster (The Witch of 71)
- Doug Erholtz as Quico, Mr. Raymond, and Captain Hopper
- Kate Higgins as Mrs. Worthmore, Gordon and Phoebe
- Erin Fitzgerald as Gordon and Phoebe
- Yuri Lowenthal as Junior
- Tara Platt as Gloria and Patty
- Bob Buchholz as Professor Girafalde
- Dave Mallow as Mr. Beliarge, Manny the Mailman and Mr. Crookley

== English dub ==
The series was dubbed into English and aired on Kabillion's video-on-demand service, with some changes. The theme song and most of the character names were changed, but the original theme song can be heard during the credits of nearly every episode. Spanish cuisine was Americanized, and the setting changed from Mexico to New York City. Episode titles were changed to idiomatic English, although only 2 seasons were aired in the United States.

=== US names ===
Chavo, Gloria and Quico are the only characters whose names have never been Americanized or changed. Although Paty's name sounds the same, the US version adds another "t" to the name.

- Don Ramón – Mr. Raymond
- Doña Florinda – Mrs. Worthmore
- Professor Jirafales – Professor Girafalde
- Doña Clotilde, La bruja del 71 – Miss Pinster, The Witch of 71
- Señor Barriga – Mr. Beliarge
- Jaimito el cartero – Manny the Mailman
- La Popis – Phoebe
- Ñoño – Junior
- Godínez – Gordon
- Paty – Patty
- El Chapulín Colorado – Captain Hopper
- Señor Hurtado – Mr. Crookley
- Serafina – Stephanie
- El Justiciero Enmascarado – The Secret Masked Crusader
- La Rubia Margot – Margot Blonde
- Panfilo – The Baby
- Vicente/Chente – Chova
- Rufino Malacara – Ruffino Meanface

== Episode list ==
=== Season 1 (2006–2007) ===
The original title is in the original Mexican Spanish version, which aired on Canal 5. The English title is the American English version.

Original title	English title
"Los globos"	"Ballooney!"
"Insomnio"	"Snoozer Loser"
"Una mosca en el café"	"Bread and Butterflies"
"Satanás"	"Pooch of Darkness"
"Los yeseros"	"Plaster Disaster"
"La venta de churros"	"Churro Liscious"
"Toques a ritmo de vals"	"Lights Out!"
"Falta de agua"	"Dry Spell"
"El juego de béisbol"	"Know Hitters"
"El Chavo lavacoches"	"Bubble Trouble"
"Fútbol Americano"	"Kickin It"
"Un ratero en la vecindad"	"A Brief Thief"
"La mascota de Quico"	"Trial and Terror"
"Fotos buenas, regulares y peores"	"A Picture's Worth a Thousand Nerds"
"El amor llegó a la vecindad"	"Love in the Neighborhood"
"Una broma de gran peso"	"What Ghosts Around Comes Around"
"Cuéntame una de fantasmas"	"The Witch's Den"
"Clases de box"	"Boxing Lessons"
"Deudas a pagar y sillas a pegar"	"Chair Repair"
"Los bomberos"	"Fire in the Hole"
"Limpieza en la vecindad"	"Scrub Down"
"Pintando la vecindad"	"Painting Party"
"El desayuno del Chavo"	"Chavo's Breakfast"
"La casita del Chavo"	"Play House"
"Sonámbulos"	"Sleepwalkers"
"Vacaciones en Acapulco"	"Acapulco"

=== Season 2 (2007–2008) ===
Original title	English title
"El gran premio de la vecindad"	"The Grand Prix of the Neighborhood"
"El Justiciero Enmascarado	"The Secret Masked Crusader"
"Las historias de terror"	"Horror Stories"
"¡Como suben los alimentos!"	"What Goes Up, Must Come Down!"
"Dinero perdido"	"Lost Money"
"Cuidemos el agua"	"Wasting Water"
"Don Ramón enamorado"	"Raymond's in Love"
"Amar a los enemigos"	"Love Thy Enemy"
"Regalo de Navidad I"	"Christmas Party"
"Regalo de Navidad II"	"The Gift of Christmas"
"El Hombre Invisible"	"The Invisible Man"
"Las aguas frescas"	"Freshwater"
"Don Ramón lechero"	"The Milk Man"
"La vecindad en guerra"	"The Neighborhood at War"
"Se busca"	"Wanted"
"Canta, Chavo"	"Chavo Sings"
"¡Esas llantitas, Señor Barriga!"	"Love Handles"
"Invasión extraterrestre"	"Alien Invasion"
"El campamento"	"The Camping Trip"
"Los dientes de leche"	"Baby Teeth"
"La novia del Chavo"	"Chavo's Date"
"Un bebé en la vecindad"	"Baby Talk"
"Vamos al circo"	"Let's go to the Circus"
"Las olimpiadas"	"The School Olympics"
"Los juguetes de papel"	"Paper Toys"
"Los piratas"	"The Pirates"

=== Season 3 (2009–2010) ===
This was the last English-dubbed season. Only the first 6 episodes of this season were dubbed, and they have never been released publicly or aired on Kabillion.

Original title	English title
"Visita al zoológico"	"Visit to the Zoo"
"Todo por un pastel"	"All For a Cake"
"El partido de fútbol"	"Soccer Match"
"Como de película"	"Like the Movie"
"El Chavo y el lobo"	"Chavo and the Wolf"
"Una de vaqueros"	"A Cowboy's Story"
"Aguas con las ranas"	"Watch Out For the Frogs"
"Teatro en la vecindad"	"Theater in the Neighborhood"
"2 mosqueteras y el Chavo"	"2 Musketeers and Chavo"
"Un día de suerte"	"A Lucky Day"
"La feria"	"Let's Go To the Fair"
"El valor de la amistad"	"Friendship Vale"
"¡Aquí espantan!"	"Here's a Scare!"
"Caido del cielo"	"Out of the Blue"
"Un festival de ambiente"	"An Ambient Festival"
"Un día en la tele"	"A Day on TV"
"Un buen recado"	"A Good Message"
"El repartidor de pizzas"	"Mr. Raymond's Pizza Delivery"
"El ataque de los insectos"	"Attack of the Insects"
"Los niños pintores"	"Painter Children"
"Visita al museo"	"Visit to the Museum"
"No te vayas, Ñoño"	"Don't go away, Junior"
"Invierno en la vecindad"	"Snow in the Neighborhood"
"La casa del árbol"	"Tree House"
"La máquina del tiempo I"	"Time Machine 1"
"La máquina del tiempo II"	"Time Machine 2"

=== Season 4 (2010–2011) ===
The episode "La vecindad en venta" ("Neighborhood on Sale") was dubbed, but it was never released.

Original title	Translated title
"Viaje espacial"	"Space Travel"
"La planta del Chavo"	"Chavo's Plant"
"Una montaña altisisisísima"	"A Mountain Very Very Very Very Higher"
"Una aventura a lo grande"	"A Big Big Adventure"
"Una vecindad de leyenda"	"A Neighborhood Legend"
"Burbujas y más burbujas"	"Bubbles and More Bubbles"
"Por arte de magia"	"Magic Art"
"El consejero sentimental"	"Sentimental Councillor"
"Aventura submarina"	"Submarine Adventure"
"La vecindad en venta I"	"Neighborhood on Sale Part I"
"La vecindad en venta II"	"Neighborhood on Sale Part II"
"El Chavo científico"	"Chavo Scientific"
"Don Ramón Superestrella"	"Mr. Raymond Superstar"
"Una historia en la prehistoria"	"A Story in the Prehistory"
"Todos en forma"	"All On Form"
"El huevo fresco"	"Fresh Egg"
"Artes Marciales"	"Martial Arts"
"Las goteras"	"Leaks in the Neighborhood"
"La serenata"	"Mrs. Worthmore's Serenade"
"Granja en la vecindad"	"Farm in the Neighborhood"
"El taxi del Chavo"	"Chavo's Taxi"
"Viaje en metro"	"Subway Travel"

=== Season 5 (2012) ===
Original title	Translated title	Portuguese title
"El Chavo en Egipto"	"El Chavo in Egypt"	"Chaves no Egito"
"Historias de la vecindad"	"Neighborhood Stories"	"Histórias da Vila"
"El amuleto del Chavo"	"Chavo's Amulet"	"O Amuleto do Chaves"
"¿Quién toca el piano?"	"Who Plays the Piano?"	"Quem Toca o Piano?"
"Las chuzas del Chavo"	"Chavo's Bowling"	"Os Lances do Chaves"
"Un ataque de hipo"	"A Hiccups Attack"	"Um Ataque de Soluço"
"Don Ramón peluquero"	"Mr. Raymond Barber"	"Seu Madruga Cabeleireiro"
"Las fiestas de Tangamandapio"	"Tangamandapio Parties"	"As Festas de Tangamandápio"
"Radio Vecindad"	"Radio Neighborhood"	"Radio Vizinhança"
"Vamos al estadio"	"Let's go to the Stadium"	"Vamos ao Estádio"
"Los empleos del Chavo"	"Chavo's Works"	"Os Empregos do Chaves"
"Un amigo robot"	"A Robot Friend"	"Um Amigo Robô"
"Vuela, Chavo"	"Fly, Chavo"	"O Voo do Chaves"
"¡Qué bonita navidad!"	"That Nice Christmas!"	"Que belo Natal"

=== Season 6 (2013) ===
Original title	Translated title
"El libro mágico"	"Magic Book"
"El eclipse"	"An Eclipse in the Neighborhood"
"En la lavandería"	"A Day in the Laundry"
"El juego de Tenis"	"Tennis Game"
"Viaje en avión"	"Plane Travel"
"El gimnasio de la vecindad"	"Gym of the Neighborhood"
"La grúa de Don Ramón"	"Mr. Raymond's Crane"
"¡Qué zorrillo!"	"What Skunk!"
"El Chavo hipnotista"	"Chavo Hypnotist"
"Caballeros y dragones"	"Knights and Dragons"
"Por si las moscas"	"Just in Case"
"La Máscara del Justiciero"	"The Mask of the Righteous"
"La fábrica de juguetes"	"Toy Factory"

=== Season 7 (2014) ===
Original title	Translated title
"El Conde Crápula"	"Count Crapula"
"Hipnósis aguda"	"Acute hypnosis"
"Vámonos de vacaciones I"	"Let's Go on Vacation I"
"Vámonos de vacaciones II"	"Let's Go on vacation II"
"Quico se manchó"	"Quico spilled"
"Historias de Amor I"	"Love Stories I"
"Historias de Amor II"	"Love Stories II"

== Telecast ==
The show was aired on Canal 5, and repeats were also shown on Las Estrellas and Cartoon Network Latin America.

El Chavo Animado also aired in English via Kabillion's on-demand service in the United States. Although it was part of the video-on-demand service, the series did not appear on the Kabillion website until the site's April 2012 relaunch. The series is currently airing on BitMe and Distrito Comedia as of 2025.

== Spin-offs and merchandise ==
Televisa released six episodes of El Chavo in Mexico in 2007. The same collection was released by Universal Video Entertainment in Brazil in 2008 as Chaves em Desenho Animado. Quico, La Popis (Phoebe), Don Ramón (Mr. Raymond), Doña Florinda (Mrs. Worthmore) and Professor Jirafales (Professor Girafalde) dolls were marketed in Mexico in 2004.

=== Video games ===
A video game based on the series was developed by Kaxan Media Group and released in Mexico on April 27, 2012, for the Wii by Slang Publishing and Televisa Home Entertainment. La Vecindad de El Chavo (a Facebook social-network game) was released in March 2012 by Playful Play, a game development company in Monterrey, Nuevo León. By October 3, 2012, the game had three million registered players. It closed on August 4, 2014. In 2014, El Chavo Kart was released for the Xbox 360, PlayStation 3, and Android. However, the Android version has since been delisted from the Google Play Store. In 2014, another game was released exclusively on Android, titled El Chavo: A Carnival in the Apartments. It was developed by Blue River SA. In this game, a carnival is taking place in the housing complex, and we can play minigames to win tickets to get powerups. The game was able to be played in Spanish, English (using the names from the Kabillion dub), and Brazilian Portuguese. However, the game has since been delisted from the Google Play Store.

=== El Chapulín Colorado Animado ===
After the success of El Chavo Animado, Televisa and Ánima Estudios developed an animated series based on El Chapulín Colorado (another show created by Roberto Gómez Bolaños). It premiered on veo.tv on April 13, 2015, and on television on July 26 of that year.

== Successor ==
First presented in Los Angeles, then at MIPCOM in Cannes, a new CG-animated series adaptation of El Chavo del Ocho is currently in development. It will be produced by THR3 Media Group. It will feature the return of La Chilindrina, a character absent in the previous animated series, as of 2026.
