= KXLK-CD =

Television station in Austin, Texas

ATSC 3.0 station
- Austin, Texas; United States
- Channels: Digital: 14 (UHF); Virtual: 40

Programming
- Affiliations: see § ATSC 3.0 lighthouse

Ownership
- Owner: TelevisaUnivision; (Univision Local Media, Inc.)
- Sister stations: KAKW-DT, KTFO-CD, KLQB, KLJA

History
- Founded: October 19, 1992
- Former call signs: K67FY (1992–2001); KXLK-LP (2001); KXLK-CA (2001–2015)
- Former channel numbers: Analog: 67 (UHF, 1992–2001), 40 (UHF, 2001–2015); Digital: 23 (UHF, 2015–2019)
- Former affiliations: HSN (until 2014)
- Call sign meaning: "XL" (Roman numeral 40)

Technical information
- Licensing authority: FCC
- Facility ID: 48836
- Class: CD
- ERP: 15 kW
- HAAT: 295.5 m (969 ft)
- Transmitter coordinates: 30°19′34″N 97°47′59″W

Links
- Public license information: Public file; LMS

KXLK-CD (channel 40) is a low-power, Class A television station in Austin, Texas, United States. It is owned by TelevisaUnivision alongside Killeen-licensed Univision owned-and-operated station KAKW-DT (channel 62). KXLK-CD's transmitter is located at the West Austin Antenna Farm north of West Lake Hills.

== History ==
The station was affiliated with the religious African-American The Word Network. Until September 2014, KXLK-CA was the Home Shopping Network affiliate for the Austin area.

Due to the 2016–2017 FCC TV spectrum auction, KXLK-CD moved from RF channel 23 to RF channel 14 on June 21, 2019. On October 17, 2017, Univision announced its intent to purchase KXLK-CD from Radio Spectrum Partners for $2.55 million.

== ATSC 3.0 lighthouse ==
KXLK-CD transitioned to an ATSC 3.0 lighthouse station on May 19, 2021, and carries ATSC 3.0 simulcasts of KTBC, KAKW, and KTFO.

The following ATSC 3.0 subchannels broadcast on RF channel 14:

Subchannels of KXLK-CD
Channel	Res.	Short name	Programming
7.1	1080p	KTBC*NX	Fox (KTBC)
31.1	1080p	KTFO*NX	UniMás (KTFO-CD)
40.1		KXLK*NX	Main KXLK-CD programming
62.1	1080p	KAKW*NX	Univision (KAKW-DT)
