= El Chavo Kart =

2014 video game

- Cover of the Xbox 360 version
- Developer: Efecto Studios (along with Slang)
- Publisher: Televisa Home Entertainment (in conjunction with Slang)
- Composers: Germán Arroyo; Alan García; Daniel Gutiérrez
- Series: El Chavo
- Engine: Unreal Engine 3 Unity (Android)
- Platforms: Xbox 360; PlayStation 3 Android iOS
- Release: WW: February 21, 2014
- Genre: Racing
- Modes: Single-player, multiplayer

El Chavo Kart (Chaves Kart in Brazil) is a 2014 kart racing game created by Colombian developer Efecto Studios and Mexican developer Slang and published by Televisa Home Entertainment for Xbox 360 and PlayStation 3. A conversion of the game was also released on Android, but was later removed. The game features almost all of the characters of El Chavo Animado (except for Jaimito and Gloria), with tracks loosely based on locations from the animated series. In 2020, an updated version of the game was released for iOS and Android with an updated art style reminiscent of Funko POP! toys.

== Gameplay ==
El Chavo Kart is a mascot-based kart racing game in the same vein as the Mario Kart series. Players get to compete as characters from the series (except for Jaimito and Gloria), along with tracks loosely based on locations from the animated series.

The game offers three game modes: Cups, Exhibition, and Challenges. In "Cups", the player can unlock characters, while at the end of "Challenges" scenarios and tracks are unlocked. The player can collect power-ups along the race which can be used to benefit himself and gain an advantage in the race. Tracks include series features and scenarios such as Azteca Stadium, the city of Acapulco, the Maracanã Stadium in Rio de Janeiro and also Stadium TFC in Toulouse. Each track can be raced in the opposite direction, and include alternative paths, traps and obstacles. The game features local multiplayer, allowing up to four players to compete against each other simultaneously. The game features 46 trophies or achievements that can be unlocked to progress through the game.

== Development ==
El Chavo Kart was announced by Roberto Gómez Fernández, son of Mexican comedian and series creator Roberto Gómez Bolaños, known as "Chespirito", coinciding with Bolaños' 85th birthday in 2014, also the year of Bolaños' death. Voice actors from the animated series reprised their roles in the game.

The game is developed with Unreal Engine 3, and features graphics that mimic the series' art style. Each character has different animations that appear in races when the player hits or jumps, or win a race. Also, the development team took more than two years to carry out, as also with the participation of about 150 people in the studio.

== Marketing ==
The Brazilian version of the game (where it is given the title Chaves Kart) features Rio de Janeiro's Corcovado as the background image on the game's cover. The French version of the game (where it is also given the title Course avec Charlie) [citation?] also features Toulouse's Pyrenees as the background image on the game's Xbox 360 cove, Édgar vivar comes to Brazil in 2014 to promote the video game and the new maps.

== Reception ==
El Chavo Kart has received mixed reviews.
