= KLQB =

Radio station in Texas, United States

Coordinates: 30.435°N 97.365°W

- Taylor, Texas; United States
- Broadcast area: Austin, Texas
- Frequency: 104.3 MHz (HD Radio)
- Branding: Que Buena 104.3

Programming
- Format: Regional Mexican
- Subchannels: HD2: TUDN Radio (Spanish sports); HD3: Stream Tejano

Ownership
- Owner: Uforia Audio Network; (Univision Radio Illinois, Inc.)
- Sister stations: Radio: KLJA; TV: KAKW-DT; KTFO-CD; KXLK-CD

History
- First air date: June 26, 1998 (as KQBT)
- Former call signs: KPLE-FM (4/1980-8/1980); KPLE (1980–1994); KKIK (1994–1998); KQBT (1998–2004); KOYT (2004–2005); KXBT (2005–2007)
- Call sign meaning: "La Que Buena"

Technical information
- Licensing authority: FCC
- Facility ID: 63201
- Class: C2
- ERP: 48,000 watts
- HAAT: 150 meters (490 ft)

Links
- Public license information: Public file; LMS
- Webcast: Listen Live
- Website: Que Buena Online

KLQB (104.3 FM "Que Buena 104.3") is a regional Mexican radio station serving the Austin, Texas, area. It is owned by TelevisaUnivision, via Uforia Audio Network, and broadcasts with an ERP of 48,000 watts and is licensed to Taylor, Texas. Its transmitter is located in Coupland, Texas, and the station has studios along MoPac Expressway in Northwest Austin.

== History ==
=== As "The Beat 104.3" (1st phase, KQBT) ===
KLQB was launched as KQBT on 104.3 FM (licensed to Taylor, Texas) in June 1998 after the frequency would be moved southward to the Austin area after previously serving the Temple-Killeen market as KKIK. Soon enough, KQBT, with the branding [The] Beat 104.3, began targeting Austin in 1998 as a Rhythmic contemporary hits station, playing Hip Hop, R&B, some Pop, and some Dance. At the time, the station complemented the then co-owned Urban AC station KJCE "K-Juice 1370" (now a talk radio station). This would eventually propel KQBT as one of Austin's Top 5 radio stations (sometimes #1) according to Arbitron ratings."The Beat 104.3". By 2001, the station dropped Dance music and eventually Pop music from the playlist and has gone straight Hip Hop and R&B. KQBT was in initial competition with Top 40 rival KHFI (of which it first challenged) and Rhythmic Oldies-turned-AC rival KFMK-FM (launched a year after KQBT); it gained direct competition from KDHT (now KGSR) in 2003.

=== As KOYT "104.3 The Coyote" ===
In 2004, Howard Stern was expected back on the radio due in several markets due to Clear Channel firing him for indecency. KQBT, along with five other replacement radio stations owned by what was then called Infinity Broadcasting (which owned Stern's show through syndication), was selected to carry the morning drive. As a result, there would be uncertainty that the Hip Hop/R&B format would even survive with Stern on the air, so the frequency flipped to talk radio, changed calls to KOYT and called itself 104.3 The Coyote on July 19, 2004. In addition to Stern, KOYT's lineup consisted of Don & Mike, Russ Martin, Tom Leykis, and The John and Jeff Show, as well as programming from All-Comedy Radio. However, the talk format did not do well at all in the market.

=== As "Beat 104.3" (2nd phase, KXBT) ===
With the failure of KOYT, the frequency returned to a Rhythmic Contemporary Hits format six months later on January 21, 2005, under the former branding Beat 104.3 but with new call letters"104.3 KXBT/Taylor, TX". KXBT because KQBT was already assigned to a radio station in Llano, Texas (they are now on a radio station in Houston). Even though it was a Rhythmic, this time KXBT skewed slightly towards an unofficial Mainstream Urban format, unusual for the market's demographics given the fact less than 10% of the Austin radio market's population is African American. To accommodate the return, the station held a campaign in early 2005 to "Make The Big Switch Back to the Beat," with the slogan at the time being "The People's Station" before finally settling on "The Beat of the ATX." It became home for a short time to the controversial Star and Buc Wild Morning Show from December 2005 to May 2006. Soon after the return to the format, KXBT reintroduced Freestyle Dance music and added more Reggaeton music.

=== As KLQB "La Que Buena" ===
In 2006, CBS Radio sold the Austin radio cluster (also including KAMX, KKMJ and KJCE) to Entercom. On February 21, 2007, Entercom announced that the 104.3 frequency and KXBT calls would be sold to Univision and change to a Spanish format on February 26. The staff was already told of this stunning news before it was made public in the trades and was expecting to leave prior to the flip. Albeit that Univision owned Hip Hop music stations in San Antonio, Houston, the Rio Grande Valley and Albuquerque at the time, the Austin cluster of Univision did not retain the format. After the announcement was made, Border Media flipped KXXS to a Rhythmic Top 40 format, hired the former KXBT staff, and relaunched as "The Beat 104.9", thus leaving the station virtually intact. (The previous Digital 104.9 format was relaunched on 92.5.)

As for "The Beat", KXBT (on 104.9) has since signed off the format in 2008 for a different format, but was resurrected by Clear Channel (which trademarked that brand for its urban and rhythmic stations a decade earlier) on KFMK and then moved to KPEZ.

Previous logo
