= Rodolfo Borrell =

Spanish football coach

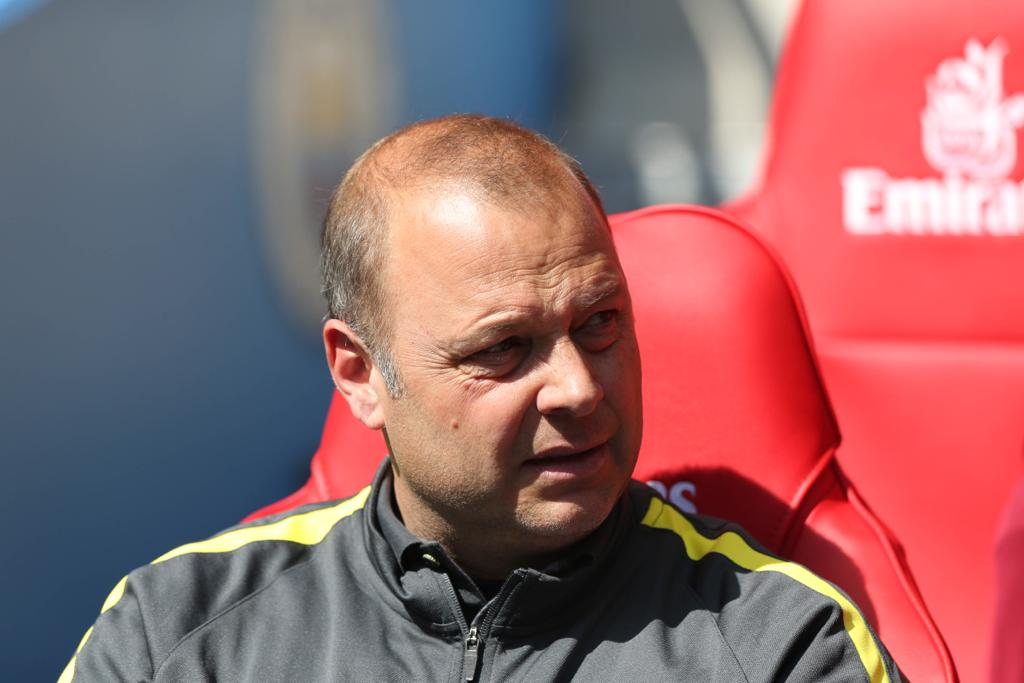
- Rodolfo at the Emirates in 2018

Personal information
- Date of birth: 31 January 1971 (age 55)
- Place of birth: Barcelona, Spain

Managerial career
- Years: Team
- 1995–2003: Barcelona U11-U12-U14
- 2003–2006: Barcelona U16
- 2006–2008: Barcelona U18
- 2008: Iraklis (assistant)
- 2008: Iraklis
- 2009: Barcelona U18
- 2009–2011: Liverpool U18
- 2011–2012: Liverpool U23
- 2012–2014: Liverpool (academy technical director)
- 2014–2016: Manchester City (academy technical director)
- 2016–2023: Manchester City (assistant)
- 2023–2026: Austin FC (sporting director)

Rodolfo Borrell Marco (born 31 January 1971) is a Spanish football coach, who was most recently sporting director at Austin FC.

== Management career ==
=== Barcelona ===
Borrell was a youth coach at Barcelona, where he coached some of the world's finest emerging talent at their renowned 'La Masia' Academy. Borrell still possesses one of the most successful records in history of Youth Football coaching at F.C. Barcelona. He worked at Barcelona between 1995 and 2008, where he formed part of the team that developed Lionel Messi, Gerard Pique and Cesc Fàbregas.

=== English Premier League ===
In July 2009, Liverpool agreed a deal to bring in Barcelona youth coaches Rodolfo Borrell and Pep Segura to the club. In the mid-late 2000s, first team coach Rafael Benitez made it a priority of his to improve the club's Academy, hence why Borrell was brought in. After two successful seasons as head coach of the U18s, Borrell became Liverpool's Reserve Team Head Coach in May 2011."It's a great honour for me. The club have shown they have great confidence in my ability and I am happy. It is a job that means my name will sit forever alongside the likes of Bob Paisley, Joe Fagan, Roy Evans, Phil Thompson and Sammy Lee. They are big names in Liverpool's history and it is also an important role because it is the final step in the Academy. The players need to be ready if they are to make the move into the first-team set-up and I am going to fight for that." After a two-year spell as head coach of Liverpool U18s and an eighteen-month stint in charge of the Reserve side, he then became head of academy coaching at Liverpool. Recruited in the summer of 2009 by Rafael Benitez, he and compatriot Jose Segura helped revolutionise Liverpool's ailing Academy. Having failed to provide the first team with a key player since Steven Gerrard who made his debut in 1998, the academy produced numerous talents since Borrell's appointment.

In March 2014, Borrell was appointed global technical director of Manchester City. In July 2016, he was promoted to first-team assistant coach under Pep Guardiola, having served as head of academy coaching since July 2014. Borrell was part of Guardiola's coaching staff during Manchester City's treble-winning 2022–23 season before leaving to become sporting director of Austin FC.

=== Austin FC ===
In June 2023, Borrell was appointed to be named the Sporting Director for MLS side Austin FC, replacing former Manchester City captain and United States international Claudio Reyna. Borrell was relieved of his duties as Sporting Director on 18 May 2026, alongside head coach Nico Estévez.
