= KAKW-DT =

Television station in Killeen, Texas

- Killeen–Austin, Texas; United States
- City: Killeen, Texas
- Channels: Digital: 13 (VHF); Virtual: 62
- Branding: Univision 62; Noticias N+ Univision Texas Central (newscasts)

Programming
- Affiliations: 62.1: Univision; 62.2: UniMás; for others, see § Subchannels

Ownership
- Owner: TelevisaUnivision; (KAKW License Partnership, L.P.)
- Sister stations: KTFO-CD, KXLK-CD, KLQB, KLJA

History
- Founded: August 22, 1988
- First air date: May 31, 1996
- Former call signs: KAKW (1996–2003); KAKW-TV (2004–2009)
- Former channel numbers: Analog: 62 (UHF, 1996–2009); Digital: 23 (UHF, 2001–2003)
- Former affiliations: UPN (primary 1996–2001, secondary 2001–2002); The WB (secondary 1996–2001, primary 2001–2002)
- Call sign meaning: Austin, Killeen, Waco

Technical information
- Licensing authority: FCC
- Facility ID: 148
- ERP: 39 kW
- HAAT: 553 m (1,814 ft)
- Transmitter coordinates: 30°43′34″N 97°59′23″W

Links
- Public license information: Public file; LMS
- Website: www.univision.com/austin/kakw

KAKW-DT (channel 62) is a television station licensed to Killeen, Texas, United States, serving as the Austin area outlet for the Spanish-language network Univision. It is owned and operated by TelevisaUnivision alongside low-power, Class A UniMás outlet KTFO-CD (channel 31). The two stations share studios on North Loop Boulevard in Austin; KAKW-DT's transmitter is located in unincorporated Williamson County (approximately halfway between Austin and Killeen). Although the station is licensed to a community in the Waco market, most of its local programming and advertising is targeted at the Austin market.

== History ==
=== 1996–2002: Early years ===
Former logo, used on January 7, 2002, until December 31, 2012.

The station first signed on the air on May 31, 1996, as a primary affiliate of UPN and a secondary affiliate of The WB for the Waco–Killeen–Temple market; the station was originally owned by White Knight Broadcasting, with Communications Corporation of America (ComCorp), owner of Waco-based Fox affiliate KWKT (channel 44) and the station's Bryan-based satellite KYLE-TV (channel 28), providing sales and other services to KAKW under a commercial inventory agreement. KAKW had secured the UPN affiliation in June 1995, prior to going on the air; the WB affiliation had previously been held by KYLE before its 1996 acquisition by ComCorp. Prior to the launch of Fredericksburg-based San Antonio station KBEJ (now KCWX) in 2000, channel 62 doubled as an alternate UPN affiliate for the Austin television market, alongside K13VC (channel 13); the move of KAKW's digital signal from channel 23 to channel 13 would subsequently result in the shutdown of K13VC on March 29, 2003.

=== 2002–present: Affiliating with Univision, switch to Spanish-language programming ===
In January 2001, KAKW became a primary WB affiliate, though UPN programming was retained on a secondary basis. That October, White Knight agreed to sell KAKW to Univision in a $30 million deal, with the intention of converting it into a Univision station; the sale was opposed by The WB, who filed a lawsuit seeking to block the sale and the concurrent sale of El Paso sister station KKWB to Entravision Communications, as KAKW's contract with The WB was not slated to expire until January 15, 2008. On January 7, 2002, after Univision assumed control of KAKW, KAKW dropped the WB and UPN affiliations and was converted to a Univision owned-and-operated station; it also expanded the station's market coverage to Austin. Univision also invested in creating a news department for KAKW and began producing daily Spanish-language local newscasts. The WB subsequently moved its programming in the Waco–Killeen–Temple market to a secondary clearance on ABC affiliate KXXV (channel 25), while UPN signed a deal with Time Warner Cable to air its programming on a leased access channel that would later be replaced by KBTX-TV's second digital subchannel. It was the first time Austin had a full-power Spanish-language TV station.

Until 2009, KAKW also operated a repeater in Austin, KAKW-CA (channel 31). That year, the station switched its affiliation to Telefutura, and changed its call letters to KTFO-CD.

== News operation ==
KAKW-DT broadcasts five hours of locally produced newscasts each week, consisting of two half-hour evening newscasts shown at 5 and 10 p.m. on weekdays. Following its purchase by Univision Communications in 2002, the station invested in the development of a news department for KAKW and began producing daily Spanish-language local newscasts each weeknight.

On March 27, 2015, KAKW-DT announced it would launch a regionalized morning newscast, shared with fellow Univision O&Os KXLN-DT in Houston, KUVN-DT in Dallas, and KWEX-DT in San Antonio. The newscast includes local weather and traffic cut-ins, which are also provided during Univision's Despierta América. The regionalized morning newscast uses the Noticias Texas branding. On March 11, 2019, KAKW-DT started airing a morning show called Noticias Texas Central, which is produced from sister station KWEX-DT in San Antonio. KWEX also produces the midday and weekend newscasts as it shares reporters with KAKW.

== Technical information ==
=== Subchannels ===
Subchannels of KAKW-DT and KTFO-CD
Subchannel		Res.	Short name	Programming
KAKW-DT	KTFO-CD	Res.	Short name	Programming
62.1	31.2	720p	KAKW-DT	Univision
62.2	31.1	720p	KTFO-CD	UniMás
62.3	31.3	480i	GetTV	Great (4:3)
62.4	31.4	480i	Mystery	Ion Mystery
62.5	31.5	480i	DABL	Dabl
62.6	31.6	480i	ION SD	Ion
62.7	31.7	480i	Confess	Confess
62.8	31.8	480i	MSGold	MovieSphere Gold

Subchannel broadcast with MPEG-4 video

=== Analog-to-digital conversion ===
KAKW shut down its analog signal on June 12, 2009, as part of the FCC-mandated transition to digital television for full-power stations. The station's digital signal remained on its pre-transition VHF channel 13, using virtual channel 62.
