= BitMe =

- Type: Pay television channel
- Country: Mexico
- Broadcast area: Hispanic America

Programming
- Language: Spanish
- Picture format: 1080i HDTV (downscaled to 480i/576i for the SD feed)

Ownership
- Owner: Televisa Networks (TelevisaUnivision)
- Sister channels: TL Novelas, De Película, De Película Clásico, Foro, Las Estrellas, Telehit

History
- Launched: July 15, 2019; 7 years ago
- Former names: Tiin (2011-2019)

BitMe (formerly stylized as bitMe) is a Latin American subscription television channel, of Mexican origin, owned by TelevisaUnivision. It was launched on July 15, 2019, replacing the Tiin channel.

== History ==
The channel's project began in 2018, when Televisa Networks proposed a new channel focused on gamer programming and geek culture, after the low audience rating of its predecessor Tiin to attract the attention of young audiences. BitMe was launched on July 15, 2019, replacing the channel Tiin.

Logo used until 2025

On January 6, 2025, the aesthetics of the channel were updated to look "more inspired on the Asian culture" and a new logo was introduced.
