= TelevisaUnivision =

Mexican-American media company

TelevisaUnivision Inc. Televisa, S. de R.L. de C.V.
- Formerly: Spanish International Communications Corporation (1962–1987); Univision Holdings Inc. (1987–1992); Univision Communications Inc. (1992–2022)
- Type: Private
- Traded as: NYSE: UVN (1996-2007)
- Industry: Mass media and entertainment
- Founded: 1962; 64 years ago
- Founder: Emilio Azcárraga Vidaurreta
- Headquarters: Univision Way, Doral, Florida, United States (Note: Global headquarters)
- Number of locations: Santa Fe, Mexico City, Mexico (Note: Mexican headquarters)
- Area served: Worldwide
- Key people: US CEO: Daniel Alegre; Mexico Co-CEOs: Alfonso de Angoitia; Bernardo Gomez Martinez
- Owner: Grupo Televisa (45%)
- Number of employees: 14,000
- Divisions: Univision Digital; Uforia Audio Network; TUDN; Univision Television Group; Videocine Entretenimiento; Televisa Studios; Televisa Networks; TelevisaUnivision Consumer Products; TelevisaUnivision Content Licensing; Vix; Univision Studios
- Website: corporate.televisaunivision.com

TelevisaUnivision (formerly known as Univision Communications) is a Mexican–American media company that owns American Spanish-language broadcast network Univision and free-to-air channels in Mexico such as Las Estrellas, 5*, N+ Foro, and NU9VE alongside a collection of specialty television channels and production studios. Forty-five percent (45%) of the company is held by the Mexican telecommunications and broadcasting company Grupo Televisa, which was a major programming partner for Univision until the company sold their content assets to Univision Communications in 2022.

Since its founding in the early 1960s as Spanish International Network (SIN), the United States' first Spanish language television network, the company has catered to Hispanic and Latino Americans. It is currently a multimedia conglomerate, with free-to-air and specialty, digital and audio networks, including 65 television stations, online and mobile apps and products.

TelevisaUnivision's global headquarters is located in a complex known as "NewsPort", situated within Univision Way in Doral, Florida which also houses the studios of its Miami radio and television stations while the company's Mexican offices are located in Grupo Televisa's main offices in Santa Fe, Mexico City, Mexico.

== History ==
Logo used until December 31, 2012

Univision Communications Inc. was founded in 1961; 65 years ago, as Spanish International Communications Corporation (parent of Spanish International Network) by Rene Anselmo, a Mexican-American TV executive, Emilio Nicolas Sr., owner of KUAL-TV (now KWEX-DT) in San Antonio, and Mexican radio-TV magnate Emilio Azcárraga Vidaurreta, head of Telesistema Mexicano (now Televisa). They consolidated the operations of some independent Latino stations into a network. In 1987, Nicolas sold his part of the company to Hallmark Cards, and the name was changed to Univision Holdings. By 1992, Hallmark re-incorporated the company to Univision Communications.

On April 8, 1992, Hallmark sold Univision Communications to a group that included Los Angeles-based investor A. Jerrold Perenchio (a former partner in Norman Lear's Embassy Communications, who was outbid by the Hallmark-led consortium for the network in 1987), Emilio Azcárraga Milmo, and brothers Ricardo and Gustavo Cisneros (co-owners of Venezuelan broadcaster Venevision) for $550 million, in order to refocus its television operation efforts on cable provider Cencom Cable Associates, which it acquired the previous year for about $500 million. In order to comply with FCC rules on foreign ownership of television stations, the deal was structured to give Perenchio a controlling 75% interest in Univision's station group and 50% ownership of the network itself; Azcárraga and the Cisneroses held a 25% stake in the network and a 12.5% stake in the station group. The deal placed Univision under common ownership with competing cable channel Galavisión, which the Azcárraga-run Grupo Televisa owned at the time. The Cisneroses' ownership of stake in Univision Communications led to the broadcast of Venevision telenovelas from Venezuela, & eventually, to the co-production partnership of Venevision International and Univision Communications of telenovelas. The consortium ended up selling Univision Communications for $13.7 billion in 2007.

From September 1996 to April 2007, Univision Communications Inc. traded on the New York Stock Exchange under the symbol UVN.

In 2001, Univision Communications Inc. acquired USA Broadcasting, the station group of USA Networks, which included 13 full-power television stations. Most of these stations became part of a new network called TeleFutura, which it launched in 2002. Others joined Univision. In 2003, Univision completed the acquisition of Hispanic Broadcasting Corporation to form Univision Audio Network.

Prior to 2007, its headquarters was in the Century City neighborhood of Los Angeles.

In March 2007, Univision Communications was sold to Broadcasting Media Partners, a group led by Haim Saban that included Madison Dearborn Partners, Providence Equity Partners., TPG Capital, L.P., Thomas H. Lee Partners, and Saban Capital Group.

In May 2008, Univision Music Group was sold to Universal Music Group and combined with its Latin label to become Universal Music Latin Entertainment.

In 2009, Univision Interactive Media was formed to house Univision.com, Univision Mobile, and an array of digital offerings. Univision On Demand also debuted in 2009, through distribution partners. That same year Univision also created Univision Studios, a new production arm focused on producing and co-producing content for the company's platforms.

Randy Falco became Univision's CEO in 2011. Under Falco, the company began to expand its platforms, including launching new cable networks such as Univision Deportes Network and Univision Tlnovelas, as well as English-language properties targeting Hispanic audiences such as Flama (a YouTube channel featuring content aimed toward Hispanic young adults), and Fusion, a news channel operated as a joint venture with Disney–ABC Television Group.

On January 7, 2013, TeleFutura rebranded as UniMás. In May 2013, Univision announced an investment in Robert Rodriguez's new English-language cable channel El Rey Network.

In 2014, UCI launched Univision Mobile, La Fabrica and TheFlama.com and also continued to increase the reach of Univision Deportes, Fusion, and El Rey. Also in 2014, UCI expanded its partnership with Hulu, building on its launch as the first Spanish-language offering on Hulu in 2012.

On August 16, 2016, Univision Communications purchased Gawker Media for $135 million. The sale included six Gawker blogs – Kotaku, Jalopnik, Lifehacker, Gizmodo (and its sub-site io9), Deadspin, and Jezebel – but not the flagship Gawker site, which shut down in late August. On September 21, 2016, the Gawker Media assets acquisition was completed and said assets were moved to Gizmodo Media Group.

On May 30, 2018, Vincent Sadusky, formerly of Telemundo and the local station groups LIN Media and Media General, was appointed the new CEO of Univision, replacing outgoing Randy Falco. Under Sadusky, the company began to backpedal on its attempts to diversify into English-speaking markets, electing to focus more on its core Spanish-language properties targeting Hispanics. As part of this effort, Gizmodo Media Group was divested to private-equity firm Great Hill Partners in April 2019.

On July 20, 2019, Univision rebranded its Univision Deportes Network cable channel as TUDN, as part of a collaboration with its content partner Televisa.

On February 25, 2020, private investment firms Searchlight Capital Partners and ForgeLight (launched by founder & CEO & ex-Viacom CFO Wade Davis) agreed to acquire 64% controlling stake in the company held by its investment group ownership, while minority owner Televisa would continue to hold its 36% stake. As a result, the company would be led by Davis as CEO, eventually replacing outgoing Vincent Sandusky. The sale was completed on December 29, 2020.

On April 13, 2021, Televisa announced they would sell their media, content, and production assets to Univision. The new company would be known as TelevisaUnivision. As part of the transaction, Televisa kept the company's telecommunication and multichannel television service assets, as well as broadcast licenses for stations that air Televisa's four Mexican networks; the Mexican news operations were spun off into Tritón Comunicaciones. The merger was approved by Mexican Federal Telecommunications Institute (IFT) on September 15, 2021, and later by the U.S. Federal Communications Commission (FCC) on January 24, 2022, with the transaction completed on January 31 the same year.

In February 2022, TelevisaUnivision announced the relaunch of ViX as a streaming platform featuring both an ad-supported and a subscription tier, with an intended rollout of the AVOD tier set for March 31, 2022.

In September 2022, TelevisaUnivision completed the acquisition of American OTT streaming service Pantaya from Hemisphere Media Group in exchange for cash and select Puerto Rican radio assets, including San Juan-based WKAQ (AM) and WKAQ-FM. That same month, TelevisaUnivision acquired the rights to the Latin American Music Awards from Dick Clark Productions.

On September 27, 2023, TelevisaUnivision partnered with the Republican National Committee, the Ronald Reagan Presidential Foundation and Institute, FOX Business, and Rumble to host the second Republican presidential primary debate from the Ronald Reagan Presidential Library in Simi Valley, California.

In November 2023, TelevisaUnivision faced serious backlash from Democrats and the Hispanic community when network executives decided to air an exclusive hourlong interview with former president Donald Trump on Univision in Spanish and UNIMAS and ViX in English with Spanish subtitles, despite Trump's vulgar comments towards the Hispanic community. Many Latino celebrities, politicians, and activists have called for a boycott and branding the network as "MAGAvision".

On December 2, 2024, TelevisaUnivision CEO Daniel Alegre announced that, as part of a major restructuring plan, it would be laying off a “mid to high single digit percentage” of its workforce (between 5-9%, or 120 people, of its 14,000 staff), both in the US and Mexico “with the goal of reforming our position for 2025 and beyond.” The company is facing challenges like cord-cutting and an unsettled ad market. This coincided with the introduction of a revamped leadership team and the creation of a “Global Content Organization”.

== Properties ==
TelevisaUnivision's portfolio of properties consists of broadcast, cable, and digital networks, as well as consumer products and brand licensing.

=== Television ===
TelevisaUnivision provides programming throughout Mexico through four networks, and in the United States via Univision and UniMás through local affiliates. There are 253 Mexican local television stations (54.8% of the total commercial stations), and 59 U.S. local television stations air programming from all six terrestrial networks.

The six terrestrial networks are:

Network	Flagship	Programming
Las Estrellas	XEW-TDT 2	general programming, sports, first-run telenovelas, and news
Canal 5	XHGC-TDT 5	youth-oriented programming, American series, and films
Nueve	XEQ-TDT 9	telenovela reruns, sports, news, and comedy shows
N+ Foro	XHTV-TDT 4	all-news channel, talk, and debate programming
Univision	WLTV-DT 23 (ET); WXTV-DT 41 (ET); KXLN-DT 45 (CT); KMEX-DT 34 (PT)	general programming, sports, first-run telenovelas, and news
UniMás	WFUT-DT 68 (ET); WAMI-DT 69 (ET); KFTH-DT 67 (CT); KFTR-DT 46 (PT)	youth-oriented programming, reruns of novelas, American-produced movies and exclusive content.

TelevisaUnivision beams its terrestrial brands to affiliates. Some of its Mexico-based affiliates are owned by its parent Televisa through Televisa Regional network, airing a mixture of Televisa programming and regional programming from all four Mexico-based terrestrial networks. Foro is the only network that only has one full-time affiliate, XHTV, but some of Foro's programming can be found on most Televisa Regional television stations.

==== Cable ====
TelevisaUnivision also operates a subsidiary called Televisa Networks (often recognized within the entertainment industry by its previous moniker, Visat). This subsidiary is responsible for the distribution of TelevisaUnivision Mexico programs by satellite. It is Televisa Networks that distributes the Las Estrellas signal through satellite to Europe, Australia, and New Zealand. As of 2019, the subsidiary is currently known as Televisa Internacional with Televisa Networks being folded into the company's international division. Other channels under the Televisa Networks umbrella include:

- Adrenalina Sports Network – channel focused on the UFC (exclusive distribution across Latin America)
- Bandamax – a Banda, Norteño and Regional Mexican music station
- BitMe – its broadcasting started after the closure of its predecessor channel Tiin. It focuses on video games and anime, it has an agreement with Toei Animation as well as with Sentai Filmworks to distribute their anime.
- De Película (HD) – Mexican film channel
- Distrito Comedia – Focuses on Televisa produced sitcoms and comedy shows from the 1970s to the present. Before 1 October 2012, it was known as Clásico TV – and focused on showing popular TV shows from the past century, such as sitcoms and children shows
- Golden and Golden Edge (HD) – film channel, showcasing Hollywood blockbusters and other films
- Golden Premier – film channel, showcasing films premiered after 2011
- Las Estrellas Internacional (HD) – international version of the Mexican network, available only outside Mexico (particularly Europe, Australia, and New Zealand)
- TeleHit (HD) – music channel that regularly airs pop music videos and adult comedy shows
- Telehit Música – a Spanish language music videos station focused on tropical music (salsa, bachata, reggaeton, etc.)
- TUDN (HD) – sports channel that is often distributed in premium cable services. Shows European soccer leagues (France and Spain) and tournaments of sports not so popular in Mexico. (available only in Mexico, Central America, and Dominican Republic)
- TLN (TLNetwork) – shows telenovelas and TV series in Portuguese. (available only in Angola, Brazil, Portugal and Mozambique)
- Tlnovelas (HD) – a network devoted to classic telenovelas (soap operas)
- Unicable – features programming by Univision and original productions
- Univision Latin America – features programming from Televisa and Univision

Aside from Televisa Networks, TelevisaUnivision also operates US-based cable channels:

- Univision Tlnovelas (Telenovelas)
- Galavision Network
- De Película Clásico – Mexican film channel focused in old films

=== Radio ===
- Uforia Audio Network (35 local radio stations)

=== Digital properties ===
- Se Habla USA
- Univision.com and Univision app
- Uforia by Trebel app
- Trebel (music app) (TU is a minority investor and strategic partner)
- TUDN app
- Noticias Univision App
- N+ App
- Univision/Univision Now App
- ViX (formerly PrendeTV)
- Pantaya streaming service (Defunct; merged with ViX)

=== Consumer brands, products, and other services ===
- Univision Contigo: Univision's social impact / community empowerment brand
- Univision Farmacia
- Univision Mastercard prepaid card
- Simplemente Delicioso
- Telenovelas
- TUDN
- Despierta América
- Nuestra Belleza Latina
- Nmás

=== Other properties ===
- Entravision Communications (10%)

=== Former assets ===
==== Divested ====
- El Rey Network
- Gawker Media/Gizmodo Media Group
- Univision Music Group

==== Dormant or shuttered ====
- Fusion Media Group
  - Fusion TV
- Telenovela Channel – an English-dubbed telenovela channel in the Philippines; network owned by Beginnings at Twenty Plus, Inc. with the partnership of Televisa. The channel operates 24/7

=== TelevisaUnivision-owned television stations in the United States ===
The following table lists TV stations owned & operated by TelevisaUnivision through its "Univision Television Group" owned-and-operated station group:

Media market	State/Dist./Terr.	Station	Channel	Affiliated on	Affiliation	Notes
Phoenix	Arizona	KTVW-DT	33	1992	Univision	
Phoenix	Arizona	KFPH-DT	13	2001	UniMás	
Tucson	Arizona	KUVE-DT	46	2003	Univision	(Note: Semi-satellite of KTVW-DT.)
Tucson	Arizona	KFTU-DT	3	2001	UniMás	
Bakersfield	California	KABE-CD	39	2002	Univision	
Bakersfield	California	KBTF-CD	31	2002	UniMás	
Bakersfield	California	KTFB-CD	4	1992	UniMás	(Note: Satellite of KBTF-CD.)
Bakersfield	California	KUVI-DT	45	1997	Quest	
Fresno	California	KFTV-DT	21	1992	Univision	
Fresno	California	KTFF-DT	61	2003	UniMás	
Los Angeles	California	KMEX-DT	34	1992	Univision	
Los Angeles	California	KFTR-DT	46	2001	UniMás	
Sacramento	California	KUVS-DT	19	1997	Univision	
Sacramento	California	KTFK-DT	64	2004	UniMás	
Sacramento	California	KEZT-CD	23	1997	Univision; UniMás (CD2)	
San Francisco	California	KDTV-DT	14	1992	Univision	
San Francisco	California	KFSF-DT	66	2002	UniMás	
Denver	Colorado	KCEC	14	2003	Univision	(Note: Owned by TelevisaUnvision and operated by Entravision Communications.)
Washington, D.C.	District of Columbia	WFDC-DT	14	2001	Univision; UniMás (DT4)	
Miami–Fort Lauderdale	Florida	WLTV-DT	23	1992	Univision	
Miami–Fort Lauderdale	Florida	WAMI-DT	69	2001	UniMás	
Orlando	Florida	WVEN-TV	43	2001	Univision	
Orlando	Florida	WRCF-CD	29	2017	UniMás	
Tampa–St. Petersburg	Florida	WVEA-TV	50	2001	Univision; UniMás (DT6)	
Atlanta	Georgia	WUVG-DT	34	2001	Univision; UniMás (DT2)	
Chicago	Illinois	WGBO-DT	66	1995	Univision	
Chicago	Illinois	WXFT-DT	60	2001	UniMás	
Boston	Massachusetts	WUNI	66	2001	Univision	
Boston	Massachusetts	WWJE-DT	50	2017	True Crime Network	
Albuquerque	New Mexico	KLUZ-TV	14	2003	Univision	
New York City	New York	WXTV-DT	41	1992	Univision	
New York City	New York	WFUT-DT	68	2001	UniMás	
New York City	New York	WFTY-DT	67	2001	True Crime Network	(Note: Satellite of WFUT-DT.)
Raleigh–Durham	North Carolina	WUVC-DT	40	2003	Univision	
Raleigh–Durham	North Carolina	WTNC-LD	26	2003	UniMás	
Cleveland	Ohio	WQHS-DT	61	2001	Univision; UniMás (DT2)	
Philadelphia	Pennsylvania	WUVP-DT	65	2001	Univision	
Philadelphia	Pennsylvania	WFPA-CD	28	1992	UniMás	
Philadelphia	Pennsylvania	WMGM-TV	40	2017	True Crime Network	
Austin	Texas	KAKW-DT	62	2002	Univision	
Austin	Texas	KTFO-CD	31	1992	UniMás	
Austin	Texas	KXLK-CD	29	2018	Ion Mystery	
Dallas–Fort Worth	Texas	KUVN-DT	23	1992	Univision	
Dallas–Fort Worth	Texas	KSTR-DT	49	2001	UniMás	
Houston	Texas	KXLN-DT	45	1994	Univision	
Houston	Texas	KFTH-DT	67	2001	UniMás	
San Antonio	Texas	KWEX-DT	41	1992	Univision	
San Antonio	Texas	KNIC-DT	17	2006	UniMás	
Salt Lake City	Utah	KUTH-DT	32	2004	Univision; UniMás (DT2)	
San Juan–Ponce	Puerto Rico	WSTE-DT	7	2002	Univision	

=== Former Univision-owned stations ===
City of license / Market	Station	Channel TV (RF)	Years owned	Current ownership status
San Juan, Puerto Rico	WLII-DT	11 (11)	2002–2020	Univision affiliate owned by the Liberman Media Group
Mayagüez, Puerto Rico	WOLE-DT (Satellite of WLII-DT)	12 (12)	2014–2021	Univision affiliate owned by the Liberman Media Group

== Awards ==
Univision and its executives have been recognized for their news, entertainment, humanitarian efforts and sports.

Univision News has been recognized with the Peabody, Walter Cronkite and Gracies awards for its special "Entre el abandono y el rechazo"; the King of Spain International (Digital) Journalism Award for "Niños de la Frontera" part of Univision Noticia's La Huella Digital; and GLAAD Media Awards in the categories Outstanding Local TV Journalism for "Cobertura de Spirit Day" by Noticias Univision 34 (KMEX-DT) and Outstanding Documentary for "Identidad sin fronteras" part of Panorámica, a Univision/Pivot co-production. The Radio & Television News Association of Southern California (RTNA) also recognized Univision Noticias with eight Golden Mikes including the top honor, Broadcast Legend Award to Univision News anchor María Elena Salinas. Univision News anchor Jorge Ramos, described as "one of the most aggressive and influential newsmen in America" by Michael Scherer in his profile of Ramos published November 20, 2014, was named to the 2015 TIME 100, the magazine's annual list of the 100 most influential people in the world.

Univision's former president and CEO, Randy Falco, has been recognized by National Academy of Television Arts & Sciences (NATAS) with Board of Trustees' Award and by Kids in Need of Defense (KIND), with a Champion Award. Univision is also the recipient of ReadyNation's 2015 Business Champion for Children Award. The company's social impact initiative Univision Contigo has been recognized with a variety of awards, including Cynopsis Social Good Awards for its 2016 Vote For Your America campaign and its ongoing early childhood development initiative, Pequeños y Valiosos.

Univision's sports network, Univision Deportes (TUDN) is recipient of two Sports Emmy Awards for Outstanding Live Sports Coverage in Spanish: 2014 FIFA World Cup and Outstanding Studio Show in Spanish: Fútbol Central by the National Academy of Television Arts & Sciences (NATAS); additionally, UDNs' President Juan Carlos Rodriguez has been bestowed the Sports Network Executive of the Year Navigator Award by Cynopsis, while UDN accepted awards in the categories 'Tech Innovation' and 'Best Spot Over:30.'

== See also ==
- List of telenovelas of Univision
