= KTFO-CD =

Television station in Austin, Texas

Translator of KAKW-DT, Killeen, Texas

- Austin, Texas; United States
- Channels: Digital: 36 (UHF); Virtual: 31
- Branding: UniMás Austin

Programming
- Affiliations: 31.1: UniMás; 31.2: Univision; for others, see § Subchannels

Ownership
- Owner: TelevisaUnivision; (KAKW License Partnership, L.P.)
- Sister stations: KAKW-DT, KXLK-CD, KLQB, KLJA

History
- First air date: March 28, 1988
- Former call signs: K30CE (1988–2001); K31FM (2001–2002); KDAS-CA (2002–2005); KAKW-CA (2005–2007); KTFO-CA (2007–2010)
- Former channel numbers: Analog: 30 (UHF, 1988–2001), 31 (UHF, 2001–2010)
- Former affiliations: Univision (1988–2009)
- Call sign meaning: Telefutura

Technical information
- Licensing authority: FCC
- Facility ID: 35882
- Class: CD
- ERP: 15 kW
- HAAT: 372 m (1,220 ft)
- Transmitter coordinates: 30°19′33″N 97°47′58″W
- Translator(s): KAKW-DT 62.2 (13.2 VHF) Killeen

Links
- Public license information: Public file; LMS

KTFO-CD (channel 31) is a low-power, Class A television station in Austin, Texas, United States, serving as the local outlet for the Spanish-language network UniMás. It is owned and operated by TelevisaUnivision alongside Killeen-licensed Univision outlet KAKW-DT (channel 62). The two stations share studios on North Loop Boulevard in Austin; KTFO-CD's transmitter is located at the West Austin Antenna Farm north of West Lake Hills.

Although KTFO-CD identifies as a separate station in its own right, it is officially licensed as a translator of KAKW-DT. In addition to its own digital signal, KTFO-CD is simulcast in high definition on KAKW-DT's second digital subchannel (62.2) from a transmitter in unincorporated Williamson County (approximately halfway between Austin and Killeen). KAKW-DT, in turn, is simulcast on KTFO-CD's second digital subchannel.

== History ==
The station first signed on the air on March 28, 1988, as K30CE, broadcasting on UHF channel 30. In 2001, the station changed its call letters to K31FM, and relocated to channel 31. In 2002, the station's calls changed again to KDAS-CA, and became a repeater of KAKW-TV in Killeen, after that station switched its affiliation to Univision. It later changed its call letters to KAKW-CA in 2005, and then to KTFO-CA in 2007. In 2009, the station was relaunched with as a separate outlet from KAKW and affiliated with Telefutura (now UniMás). In 2010, the station converted to a digital signal and modified its callsign to KTFO-CD.

== Subchannels ==
Subchannels of KAKW-DT and KTFO-CD
Channel		Res.	Short name	Programming
KAKW-DT	KTFO-CD	Res.	Short name	Programming
62.1	31.2	720p	KAKW-DT	Univision
62.2	31.1	720p	KTFO-CD	UniMás
62.3	31.3	480i	GetTV	Great (4:3)
62.4	31.4	480i	Mystery	Ion Mystery
62.5	31.5	480i	DABL	Dabl
62.6	31.6	480i	ION SD	Ion Television
62.7	31.7	480i	Confess	Confess
62.8	31.8	480i	MSGold	MovieSphere Gold

Subchannel broadcast with MPEG-4 video
