= Tlnovelas =

Spanish-language pay television network

TLNovelas
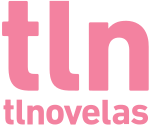
- Country: Mexico
- Broadcast area: Latin America; Africa

Programming
- Languages: English; Spanish
- Picture format: 1080i HDTV (downscaled to 480i/576i for the SD feed)

Ownership
- Owner: Televisa Networks (TelevisaUnivision)
- Sister channels: Las Estrellas; FOROtv; Telehit; BitMe; Bandamax; De Pelicula; De Película Clásico

Links
- Website: www.televisa.com/tlnovelas

Tlnovelas (stylized as tlnovelas) is a Spanish-language pay television network that broadcasts Mexican telenovelas produced by TelevisaUnivision, the owner of the channel.

Tlnovelas is distributed around the world via two feeds: Tlnovelas America and Tlnovelas Europa.

From 2003 to 2005 Tlnovelas broadcast Mexican films from the Golden Age during the weekends due to complaints about re-running episodes of their telenovelas shown during the week. Some of the films shown pertained to the drama genre.

On 16 February 2019 the channel renewed its programming to offer original content including Ellas con las novelas, Las 5 Mejores, and Confesiones con Aurora Valle.

== Availability ==
Tlnovelas is available in Mexico and the rest of Latin America (except Brazil, Cuba, and Puerto Rico), Australia, Canada, and parts of Europe. Televisa broadcasts telenovelas dubbed in Brazilian Portuguese on TLN Network, available in Angola and Mozambique. TLN Network was also available in Brazil until February 2013.

=== TLNovelas América ===
TLNovelas América available in Mexico and other parts of Latin America.

=== TLNovelas Europa ===
TLNovelas Europa is broadcast by Europa, in countries like Spain, and in Oceania in countries like Australia and New Zealand.

=== TLN Network ===
Channel that broadcasts programming in Portuguese. It has coverage in countries such as Angola and Mozambique and also operates in Brazil through online TV Guigo.

=== TLNovelas Univision ===
Released March 1, 2012, owned by the Univision Communications group in partnership with Televisa. The channel has coverage in the United States and Puerto Rico.

=== TLNovelas África ===
Launched on September 14, 2020, it broadcasts English programming to the African continent through operators DStv, GOtv, Zuku TV, StarSat and StarTimes.

== Programming ==
=== Current original programming ===
- Las 5 Mejores (February 16, 2019 – present)
- Confesiones con Aurora Valle (February 16, 2019 – present)
- Ellas con las novelas (February 16, 2019 – present)
- Tlminutos (February 16, 2019 – present)
- El cielo y el infierno (October 26, 2019)

=== Former original programming ===
- Intrusos (July 9, 2018 – June 14, 2019)

== See also ==
- Univision tlnovelas
