= Bandamax =

- Country: Mexico
- Broadcast area: Latin America; United States

Programming
- Picture format: HDTV 1080i (downscaled to 480i/576i for the SD feed)

Ownership
- Owner: Televisa Networks (TelevisaUnivision)
- Sister channels: TL Novelas, De Película, De Película Clásico, N+ Foro, Las Estrellas, Telehit

Links
- Website: bandamax.tv

Availability

Streaming media
- Service(s): DirecTV Stream, Hulu + Live TV, YouTube TV and Vidgo

Bandamax is a 24-hour cable television music channel owned by TelevisaUnivision. It is available in Mexico, the United States, and Latin America. It focuses on Regional Mexican music; in addition to banda music, its playlist includes mariachi and norteño, among others.

== History ==
Bandamax was released on December 1, 1996. In the beginning, the channel had its own programs. However, in late 1998, its programming became automated in music videos. In November 2003, the channel was officially launched in the United States. Two years later, in 2005, at the request of the channel's audience, Bandamax again incorporated original production programs.

Logo used from 1998 to 2015.

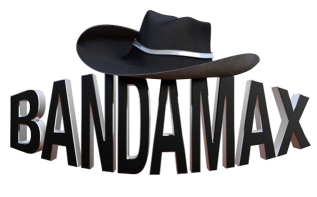
Logo of Bandamax from 2015 to 2017.
