= TeleHit Música =

Mexican cable television channel

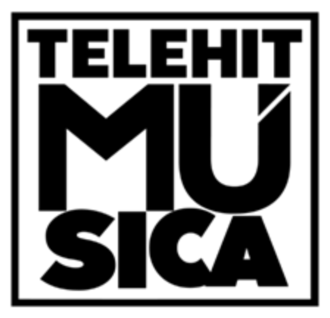
Telehit Music 2020 Official Logo

TeleHit Música (formerly Ritmoson, shortened for branding purposes to RMS, and TeleHit Urbano) is a Mexican-based pan-Spanish American music video channel, owned by TelevisaUnivision, the world's largest Spanish-language broadcaster. In addition to its broadcast channel, RMS hosted the Orgullosamente Latino Awards. TelevisaUnivision also distributes the channel in the United States.
