= De Película =

Cable television channel

De Pelicula
- Logo used since 2021
- Country: Mexico
- Broadcast area: Mexico; Latin America; United States

Programming
- Picture format: 1080i HDTV (downscaled to 480i/576i for the SDTV feed)

Ownership
- Owner: Televisa Networks (TelevisaUnivision)
- Sister channels: De Película Clásico; N+ Foro; Las Estrellas; TL Novelas; TeleHit; TeleHit Música; Bandamax

History
- Launched: January 22, 1990 (Mexico); December 25, 1991 (Latin America)
- Former names: Corte Latino (1994-1999)

Availability

Streaming media
- YouTube TV: Internet Protocol television

De Película is a Spanish-language cable and satellite television channel focused on contemporary and classic films. De Película Clásico is a channel focusing on classic movies from the 1930s to 1950s. Both channels are owned by TelevisaUnivision under Televisa Networks, and are available in Mexico, the United States, and Latin America.

Original De Pelicula logo (2003–2011)

De Pelicula logo in 2011–2016

== Distribution ==
Both De Película and De Película Clásico were launched in the United States in May 2003 by TuTV, a joint venture between Univision and Televisa. Both channels are available on the Dish Network, a satellite TV provider.
