= 2019 New York City FC season =

New York City FC
2019 season
- Head coach: Domènec Torrent
- Stadium: Yankee Stadium; The Bronx, New York
- MLS: Conference: 1st Overall: 2nd
- MLS Cup Playoffs: Conference Semifinals
- U.S. Open Cup: Quarterfinals
- Highest home attendance: League: 28,895 (August 24 vs. New York Red Bulls)
- Lowest home attendance: League: 18,113 (August 8 vs. Houston Dynamo); All: 2,014 (June 12 vs. North Carolina FC, USOC R4)
- Average home league attendance: League: 21,107
- Biggest win: 4–0 (June 12 vs. North Carolina FC, USOC R4)
- Biggest defeat: 0–4 (March 2 at Toronto FC)
Home colors	Away colors

The 2019 New York City FC season was the club's fifth season of competition and its fifth in the top tier of American soccer, Major League Soccer. New York City FC played its home games at Yankee Stadium in the New York City borough of The Bronx.

== Roster ==
As of October 6, 2019

Squad No.	Name	Nationality	Position(s)	Since	Date of birth (age)	Signed from	Games played	Goals scored
Goalkeepers
1	Sean Johnson	(United States)	GK	2016	May 31, 1989 (aged 30)	(United States) Chicago Fire	105	0
13	Luis Barraza	(United States)	GK	2019	November 8, 1996 (aged 22)	(United States) Chicago FC United	0	0
18	Jeff Caldwell	(United States)	GK	2018	February 20, 1996 (aged 23)	(United States) Virginia Cavaliers	0	0
41	Brad Stuver	(United States)	GK	2018	April 16, 1991 (aged 28)	(United States) Columbus	11	0
Defenders
2	Ben Sweat	(United States)	LB	2017	September 4, 1991 (aged 28)	(United States) Tampa Bay Rowdies	81	1
3	Anton Tinnerholm	(Sweden)	RB	2018	February 26, 1991 (aged 28)	(Sweden) Malmö	68	5
4	Maxime Chanot	(Luxembourg)	CB	2016	January 21, 1990 (aged 29)	(Belgium) Kortrijk	83	4
5	Eric Miller	(United States)	RB / LB	2019	January 15, 1993 (aged 26)	(United States) Minnesota United FC	5	0
6	Alexander Callens	(Peru)	CB	2017	May 4, 1992 (aged 27)	(Spain) Numancia	95	3
22	Rónald Matarrita	(Costa Rica)	LB	2016	July 9, 1994 (aged 25)	(Costa Rica) Alajuelense	93	3
25	Joseph Scally	(United States)	LB	2018	December 31, 2002 (aged 16)	(United States) New York City Academy	3	0
33	Sebastien Ibeagha	(United States)	CB	2018	January 21, 1992 (aged 27)	(United States) San Antonio	53	0
Midfielders
8	Alexander Ring (captain)	(Finland)	CM	2017	April 9, 1991 (aged 28)	(Germany) Kaiserslautern	97	6
10	Maximiliano Moralez	(Argentina)	AM	2017	February 27, 1987 (aged 32)	(Mexico) León	100	22
12	Ebenezer Ofori	(Ghana)	DM	2018	July 1, 1995 (aged 24)	(Germany) VfB Stuttgart	50	3
14	Juan Pablo Torres	(United States)	DM	2019	July 6, 1999 (aged 20)	(Belgium) Lokeren	4	0
15	Tony Rocha	(Belize)	CM	2019	August 21, 1993 (aged 26)	(United States) Orlando City SC	18	0
16	James Sands	(United States)	DM	2017	July 6, 2000 (aged 19)	(United States) New York Soccer Club	24	0
19	Jesús Medina	(Paraguay)	CM	2018	April 30, 1997 (aged 22)	(Paraguay) Libertad	51	10
21	Dan Bedoya	(Colombia)	AM	2018	February 13, 1994 (aged 25)	(United States) Long Island Rough Riders	2	0
55	Keaton Parks	(United States)	CM	2019	August 6, 1997 (aged 22)	(Portugal) Benfica	26	3
80	Justin Haak	(United States)	CM	2019	September 12, 2001 (aged 18)	(United States) New York City Academy	6	0
Strikers
9	Héber	(Brazil)	CF	2019	August 10, 1991 (aged 28)	(Croatia) Rijeka	26	15
11	Valentín Castellanos	(Argentina)	CF	2018	October 3, 1998 (aged 21)	(Uruguay) Club Atlético Torque	44	12
17	Gary Mackay-Steven	(Scotland)	RW	2019	August 31, 1990 (aged 29)	(Scotland) Aberdeen	12	1
28	Alexandru Mitriță	(Romania)	LW	2017	February 8, 1995 (aged 24)	(Romania) Universitatea Craiova	32	13
29	Ismael Tajouri-Shradi	(Libya)	RW	2018	March 28, 1994 (aged 25)	Austria Wien	52	19

== Player movement ==
=== In ===
Per Major League Soccer and club policies, terms of the deals do not get disclosed.

No.	Pos.	Player	Transferred from	Fee/notes	Date	Source
11	MF	(Argentina) Valentín Castellanos	(Uruguay) Club Atlético Torque	Free transfer	December 13, 2018	
15	MF	(United States) Tony Rocha	(United States) Orlando City SC	Free Transfer	December 14, 2018	
55	MF	(United States) Keaton Parks	(Portugal) Benfica	Loan	January 19, 2019	
12	MF	(Ghana) Ebenezer Ofori	(Germany) VfB Stuttgart	Loan	January 22, 2019	
80	MF	(United States) Justin Haak	(United States) New York City	Promoted from the Academy	January 24, 2019	
14	MF	(United States) Juan Pablo Torres	(Belgium) Lokeren	Free transfer	January 26, 2019	
28	MF	(Romania) Alexandru Mitriță	(Romania) Universitatea Craiova	$9.1 million	February 3, 2019	
9	FW	(Brazil) Héber	(Croatia) Rijeka	$3 million	March 21, 2019	
17	MF	(Scotland) Gary Mackay-Steven	(Scotland) Aberdeen	Free transfer	June 24, 2019	
5	DF	(United States) Eric Miller	(United States) Minnesota United FC	$50,000 in General Allocation Money	July 29, 2019	

=== Out ===
Per Major League Soccer and club policies, terms of the deals do not get disclosed.

No.	Pos.	Player	Transferred to	Fee/notes	Date	Source
20	MF	(Spain) Eloi Amagat	(Spain) UE Olot	Option declined	November 17, 2018	
7	FW	(Spain) David Villa	(Japan) Vissel Kobe	Free transfer	December 1, 2018	
14	MF	(Canada) Kwame Awuah	(Canada) Forge FC	Free transfer	November 29, 2018	
15	MF	(United States) Tommy McNamara	(United States) Houston Dynamo	Free transfer	November 29, 2018	
24	GK	(United States) Andre Rawls	(United States) Colorado Rapids	Free transfer	November 29, 2018	
22	FW	(Costa Rica) Rodney Wallace	(United States) Sporting Kansas City	Free transfer	November 29, 2018	
30	MF	(Venezuela) Yangel Herrera	(England) Manchester City	Return	November 29, 2018	
13	DF	(United States) Saad Abdul-Salaam	(United States) Seattle Sounders FC	Trade	November 29, 2018	
9	FW	(Norway) Jo Inge Berget	(Sweden) Malmö FF	Option declined	January 25, 2019	
13	DF	(Benin) Cédric Hountondji	(Bulgaria) Levski Sofia	Option declined	January 28, 2019	
17	FW	(United States) Jonathan Lewis	(United States) Colorado Rapids	Trade	May 8, 2019	

== Competitions ==
=== Exhibitions ===
February 3 1	New York City FC	0–2	Copenhagen	Abu Dhabi, UAE
06:00		Report	Skov 77', 79'	Stadium: New York University Abu Dhabi Stadium

February 8 2	New York City FC	1–1	AIK	Abu Dhabi, UAE
08:00	Mitriță 50'	Report	Ylätupa 52'	Stadium: New York University Abu Dhabi Stadium

February 16 3	Orlando City SC	2–1	New York City FC	Orlando, FL
19:50	Akindele 34'; Mueller 37'	Report	Moralez 30'	Stadium: Orlando City Stadium

February 20 4	New York City FC	0–1	Minnesota United FC	Orlando, FL
16:30		Report	Ibarra 26'	Stadium: Orlando City Stadium

February 22 5	Nashville SC	0–2	New York City FC	Nashville, TN
20:00	Akinyode (yellow card) 36'	Report	Moralez 27' (pen.); Mitriță 40'	Stadium: First Tennessee Park; Attendance: 5,384

=== Major League Soccer ===
==== Standings ====
2019 MLS Eastern Conference standings
Pos	Team	Pld	W	L	T	GF	GA	GD	Pts	Qualification
1	New York City FC	34	18	6	10	63	42	+21	64	Qualification for the conference semifinals
2	Atlanta United FC	34	18	12	4	58	43	+15	58	Qualification for the first round
3	Philadelphia Union	34	16	11	7	58	50	+8	55	Qualification for the first round
4	Toronto FC	34	13	10	11	57	52	+5	50	Qualification for the first round
5	D.C. United	34	13	10	11	42	38	+4	50	Qualification for the first round

Source: MLS
Rules for classification: 1) points; 2) total wins; 3) total goal differential; 4) total goals scored; 5) disciplinary points; 6) away goal differential; 7) away goals scored; 8) home goals scored; 9) home goal differential; 10) coin toss or drawing of lots.

==== Match results ====
NYCFC announced their 2019 season schedule on January 7, 2019.

Win Draw Loss Upcoming fixture

Unless otherwise noted, all times in EDT

March 2 1	Orlando City SC	2–2	New York City FC	Orlando, FL
14:30	Mendez (yellow card) 9'; DeJohn (yellow card) 17'; Mueller 59'; Dwyer (yellow card) 73'; Akindele 75'	Report	Ofori 13'; Sweat (yellow card) 19'; Ring 45'; Chanot (yellow card) 56'	Stadium: Orlando City Stadium; Attendance: 25,527; Referee: Baldomero Toledo

March 10 2	New York City FC	0–0	D.C. United	New York, NY
15:00	Chanot (yellow card) 27'	Report	Jara (yellow card) 57'; Mora (yellow card) 73'	Stadium: Yankee Stadium; Attendance: 24,361; Referee: Nima Saghafi

March 17 3	New York City FC	2–2	Los Angeles FC	New York, NY
15:00	Mitriță 39'; Ring 62'	Report	Vela 43', 76' (pen.)	Stadium: Yankee Stadium; Attendance: 20,339; Referee: Armando Villarreal

March 29 4	Toronto FC	4–0	New York City FC	Toronto, ON
20:00	Altidore 29'; Pozuelo 59' (pen.), 78'; Chapman 83'	Report	Castellanos (yellow card) 66'	Stadium: BMO Field; Attendance: 25,447; Referee: Chris Penso

April 6 5	New York City FC	0–0	Montreal Impact	New York, NY
13:00	Matarrita (yellow card) 32'; Sands (yellow card) 90+3'	Report	Novillo (yellow card) 59'; Piette (yellow card) 63'; Urruti (red card) 70'; Sagna (yellow card) 72'	Stadium: Yankee Stadium; Attendance: 19,353; Referee: Ted Unkel

April 13 6	Minnesota United FC	3–3	New York City FC	Saint Paul, MN
19:00	Alonso (yellow card) 8', (goal) 12'; Rodríguez 20'; Johnson 32' (o.g.)	Report	Castellanos 16'; Tajouri-Shradi 18', 64'	Stadium: Allianz Field; Attendance: 19,796; Referee: Alan Kelly

April 21 7	D.C. United	0–2	New York City FC	Washington, D.C.
16:00	Durkin (yellow card) 44'; Jara (yellow card) 45+3'; Arriola (yellow card) 90+1'	Report	Mitriță 35'; Lewis (yellow card) 48'; Ofori (yellow card) 52'; Héber 56'; Moralez (yellow card) 77'; Medina (yellow card) 90'; Johnson (yellow card) 90+4'	Stadium: Audi Field; Attendance: 18,004; Referee: Allen Chapman

April 24 8	New York City FC	1–0	Chicago Fire	New York, NY
18:00	Chanot (yellow card) 7'; Castellanos 9', (yellow card) 67'; Ring (yellow card) 16'; Tinnerholm (yellow card) 37'	Report	Adams (yellow card) 16'; Mihailovic (yellow card) 75'; Schweinsteiger (yellow card) 90'	Stadium: Yankee Stadium; Attendance: 21,791; Referee: Robert Sibiga

April 27 9	New York City FC	1–1	Orlando City SC	New York, NY
13:00	Héber 51'; Sweat (yellow card) 53'	Report	Nani 18'; Rosell (yellow card) 71'; Jansson (yellow card) 85'	Stadium: Yankee Stadium; Attendance: 20,862; Referee: Drew Fischer

May 4 10	Montreal Impact	0–2	New York City FC	Montreal, QC
5:00 pm (EST)	Lovitz (yellow card) 31'; Taïder (yellow card) 40'	Report	Moralez 6', (yellow card) 54'; Tajouri-Shradi 49'; Ring (yellow card) 64'	Stadium: Saputo Stadium; Attendance: 16,961; Referee: Baldomero Toledo

May 11 11	LA Galaxy	0–2	New York City FC	Carson, CA
13:00	Carrasco (yellow card) 79'; Ibrahimović (yellow card) 87'; Corona (yellow card) 90'	Report	Héber 44'; Moralez 45+6' (pen.); Johnson (yellow card) 87'	Stadium: Dignity Health Sports Park; Attendance: 22,806; Referee: Chris Penso

May 25 12	Chicago Fire	1–1	New York City FC	Bridgeview, IL
14:30	Sapong 28'; Katai (yellow card) 80'; Edwards (yellow card) 90+1'	Report	Mitriță 40'; Ring (yellow card) 53'; Tajouri-Shradi (yellow card) 90'	Stadium: SeatGeek Stadium; Attendance: 10,986; Referee: Ramy Touchan

June 1 13	Columbus Crew SC	2–2	New York City FC	Columbus, OH
7:30 PM EDT	Zardes 28' (pen.); D. Guzmán (yellow card) 34'; P. Santos 61'; Sauro (yellow card) 72'; Jonathan (yellow card) 90+2'	Report	Moralez (yellow card) 14'; Héber 57'; Castellanos 76', (yellow card) 85'	Stadium: Mapfre Stadium; Attendance: 13,704; Referee: Joe Dickerson

June 6 14	New York City FC	5–2	FC Cincinnati	New York, NY
7:00PM EDT	Mitriță 11'; Héber 17', 49'; Tajouri-Shradi 29'; Moralez (yellow card) 45+1', (goal) 90'; Parks (yellow card) 89'	Report	Héber 37' (o.g.); Lasso (yellow card) 71'; Ibeagha 76' (o.g.); Deplagne (yellow card) 83'; Hagglund (yellow card) 88'; Hoyte (yellow card) 90+4'	Stadium: Yankee Stadium; Attendance: 18,597; Referee: Allen Chapman

June 29 15	New York City FC	4–2	Philadelphia Union	New York, NY
7:00 p.m. EDT	Castellanos (yellow card) 13', (goal) 71', 78'; Moralez 23' (pen.), 55' (pen.); Chanot (yellow card) 39'	Report	Picault 7'; Przybylko 30', (yellow card) 89'; Ilsinho (yellow card) 45+2'; Bedoya (yellow card) 54'; Elliott (yellow card) 57'; Gaddis (yellow card) 88'	Stadium: Yankee Stadium; Attendance: 24,451; Referee: Alex Chilowicz

July 3 16	New York City FC	3–0	Seattle Sounders FC	New York, NY
7:00 p.m. EDT	Ring (yellow card) 42'; Moralez 58'; Medina 77'; Ofori 87'	Report	Tolo (yellow card) 4'; Kee-hee (yellow card) 73'	Stadium: Yankee Stadium; Attendance: 18,217; Referee: Rubiel Vazquez

July 7 17	New York City FC	0–1	Portland Timbers	New York, NY
6:30 PM EDT	Sweat (yellow card) 81'; Ofori (yellow card) 88'	Report	Blanco 14', (yellow card) 44'; Dielna (yellow card) 40'; Farfan (yellow card) 44'; Asprilla (yellow card) 45+2'; Valentin (yellow card) 45+3'	Stadium: Yankee Stadium; Attendance: 18,363; Referee: Ted Unkel

July 14 18	New York Red Bulls	2–1	New York City FC	Harrison, NJ
6:30PM EST	Tarek (yellow card) 30'; Royer 45+1' (pen.), 60'; White (yellow card) 75'; Lawrence (yellow card) 90+7'	Report	Héber 7', (yellow card) 48'; Chanot (yellow card) 45'; Ring (yellow card) 83'; Tinnerholm (yellow card) 90+4'	Stadium: Red Bull Arena; Attendance: 20,128; Referee: Alan Kelly

July 20 19	Colorado Rapids	1–2	New York City FC	Commerce City, CO
7:00 PM MDT	Anderson 6', (red card) 33'; Howard (yellow card) 36'	Report	Héber 40'; Mitriță 83'; Matarrita (yellow card) 90+1'; Johnson (yellow card) 90+3'	Stadium: Dick's Sporting Goods Park; Attendance: 15,359; Referee: Chris Penso

July 26 20	New York City FC	3–1	Sporting Kansas City	New York, NY
7:30 PM EDT	Tinnerholm 41'; Chanot (yellow card) 45'; Héber 54'; Ring 77'	Report	Espinoza (yellow card) 45' (red card) 62'; Ilie 73'; Gerso (yellow card) 80'; Baráth (yellow card) 90+4'	Stadium: Yankee Stadium; Attendance: 20,178; Referee: David Gantar

August 3 21	Real Salt Lake	3–1	New York City FC	Sandy, UT
10:00 PM EDT	Savarino 37'; Luiz (yellow card) 45+2'; Beckerman (yellow card) 68'; Rusnák 75'; Besler 88'	Report	Ring 4', (yellow card) 74'; Sands (yellow card) 28'; Matarrita (yellow card) 90+2'	Stadium: Rio Tinto Stadium; Attendance: 18,282; Referee: Tim Ford

August 8 22	New York City FC	3–2	Houston Dynamo	New York, NY
7:00 PM EDT	Mitriță 16'; Miller (yellow card) 42'; Ring (yellow card) 45+3'; Castellanos 83', 90+3', (yellow card) 90+4'	Report	Cabezas 26'; Quioto (red card) 29'; Rodríguez (yellow card) 38'; Struna (yellow card) 62'; Manotas 77'; Lundqvist (yellow card) 82'; Vera (yellow card) 86'	Stadium: Yankee Stadium; Attendance: 18,113; Referee: Robert Sibiga

August 11 23	Atlanta United FC	2–1	New York City FC	Atlanta, GA
4:00 p.m. EDT	González Pírez (yellow card) 20'; J. Martínez 42', 63' (pen.); G. Martínez (yellow card) 59'; Gressel (yellow card) 69'	Report	Sands (yellow card) 27'; Matarrita (yellow card) 37'; Chanot (yellow card) 74'; Héber 81'	Stadium: Mercedes-Benz Stadium; Attendance: 44,052; Referee: Jair Marrufo

August 17 24	FC Cincinnati	1–4	New York City FC	Cincinnati, OH
7:30 PM EDT	Cruz (yellow card) 26', (goal) 30'	Report	Miller (yellow card) 23'; Castellanos 32', 71'; Héber 45+3', 89'	Stadium: Nippert Stadium; Attendance: 27,273; Referee: Nima Saghafi

August 21 25	New York City FC	1–0	Columbus Crew SC	New York, NY
7:00 PM EDT	Castellanos 36'; Matarrita (yellow card) 80'	Report	D. Guzmán (yellow card) 12'; Jonathan (yellow card) 49'; Room (yellow card) 64'; Crognale (yellow card) 68'	Stadium: Yankee Stadium; Attendance: 19,828; Referee: Allen Chapman

August 24 26	New York City FC	2–1	New York Red Bulls	New York, NY
7:00PM EST	Moralez (yellow card) 27', (goal) 43' (pen.); Ring (yellow card) 31'; Héber 53'; Matarrita (yellow card) 90+2' (yellow-red card) 90+3'	Report	Muyl 10', (yellow card) 15'; Lawrence (yellow card) 45+3'; Rzatkowski (yellow card) 85'	Stadium: Yankee Stadium; Attendance: 28,895; Referee: Kevin Stott

August 31 27	Vancouver Whitecaps FC	1–3	New York City FC	Vancouver, BC
10:00PM EST	In-boem (yellow card) 45+4'; Henry (yellow card) 49'; Reyna 64'; Chirinos (yellow card) 79'	Report	Héber 10'; Mackay-Steven 26'; Mitriță 72', (yellow card) 85'	Stadium: BC Place; Attendance: 17,512; Referee: Marcos de Oliveira

September 7 28	New York City FC	2–1	New England Revolution	New York, NY
3:30 EST	Moralez (yellow card) 10'; Ibeagha (yellow card) 22'; Parks (yellow card) 42'; Medina 70', 90+6' (pen.); Ring (yellow card) 88'	Report	J. Caicedo 2'; Delamea (red card) 9'; Farrell (yellow card) 71'; Turner (yellow card) 74'; Zahibo (yellow card) 81'; Agudelo (yellow card) 89'; Gil (yellow card) 90+6'	Stadium: Yankee Stadium; Attendance: 21,236; Referee: Silviu Petrescu

September 11 29	New York City FC	1–1	Toronto FC	New York, NY
7:00 PM EDT	Mitriță 6'; Ring (yellow card) 23'; Tinnerholm (yellow card) 40'; Johnson (yellow card) 77'; Castellanos (yellow card) 84'	Report	Pozuelo 40' (pen.), (penalty missed) 78'; Benezet (yellow card) 85'; Mavinga (yellow card) 90+6'	Stadium: Yankee Stadium; Attendance: 19,267; Referee: Chris Penso

September 14 30	New York City FC	2–1	San Jose Earthquakes	New York, NY
12:30 PM EDT	Parks 40'; Mitriță 43'; Callens (yellow card) 55'; Johnson (yellow card) 90+4'	Report	Wondolowski 20'; Salinas (yellow card) 47'; Eriksson (yellow card) 76'	Stadium: Yankee Stadium; Attendance: 20,679; Referee: Rubiel Vazquez

September 22 31	FC Dallas	1–1	New York City FC	Frisco, Texas
6:00 PM	Ondrášek (yellow card) 45+4', (goal) 66'; Acosta (yellow card) 61'	Report	Castellanos 1'; Parks (yellow card) 13'; Moralez (yellow card) 68'; Chanot (yellow card) 90+4'	Stadium: Toyota Stadium; Attendance: 14,663; Referee: Ismail Elfath

September 25 32	New York City FC	4–1	Atlanta United FC	New York, NY
7:00 p.m. EDT	Mitriță 14', 23', 34'; Ring (yellow card) 33'; Rocha (yellow card) 36'; Chanot (yellow card) 52'; Castellanos (yellow card) 71'; Héber 87'; Matarrita (yellow card) 90+3'	Report	Pogba (yellow card) 27'; González Pírez (yellow card) 45+2'; Martínez 53' (pen.); Remedi (yellow card) 56'; Adams (yellow card) 89'	Stadium: Yankee Stadium; Attendance: 24,290; Referee: Allen Chapman

September 29 33	New England Revolution	2–0	New York City FC	Foxborough, MA
17:00 EST	Bye (yellow card) 61'; Bunbury 66'; Bou 89'	Report	Callens (yellow card) 82'	Stadium: Gillette Stadium; Attendance: 28,602; Referee: Nima Saghafi

October 6 34	Philadelphia Union	1–2	New York City FC	Chester, PA
4:00 p.m. EDT	Fabián 87' (pen.)	Report; Box Score	Matarrita 7'; Tajouri-Shradi 22'; Chanot (yellow card) 27'; Tinnerholm (yellow card) 66'; Ring (yellow card) 90+5'	Stadium: Talen Energy Stadium; Attendance: 18,525; Referee: Drew Fischer

==== MLS Cup Playoffs ====
October 23 Conference Semifinals	New York City FC	1–2	Toronto FC	New York, NY
7:00 PM EDT	Mitriță (yellow card) 30'; Tajouri-Shradi 69'	Report	Ciman (yellow card) 21'; Pozuelo 47', 90' (pen.); Bradley (yellow card) 77'	Stadium: Citi Field (Note: New York City FC hosted their Eastern Conference Semifinal playoff match at Citi Field in New York City. Yankee Stadium was not available due to the New York Yankees advancing to the 2019 American League Championship Series.); Attendance: 19,829; Referee: Jair Marrufo

=== U.S. Open Cup ===
As a member of MLS, NYCFC entered the competition at the fourth round, which was played on June 12, 2019.

June 12 4th Round	New York City FC (New York (state))	4–0	North Carolina FC	New York, New York
19:00 EDT	Guillén 25' (o.g.); Bedoya (yellow card) 41'; Medina 45+2'; Parks 52', 76'; Haak (yellow card) 66'	Report	Smith (yellow card) 62'	Stadium: Belson Stadium; Attendance: 2,014; Referee: Lorant Varga

June 19 5th Round	D.C. United (Washington, D.C.)	1–2	(New York (state)) New York City FC	Washington D.C.
19:00 EDT	Rooney 32'; Robinson (yellow card) 55'; Acosta (yellow card) 69'; Rodríguez (yellow card) 76'	Report	Mitriță 38'; Tajouri-Shradi 41'	Stadium: Audi Field; Referee: Fotis Bazakos

July 10 Quarter-finals	Orlando City SC (Florida)	1–1 (a.e.t.) (5–4 p)	(New York (state)) New York City FC	Orlando, Florida
18:30 EDT	Mueller 61'; Méndez (yellow card) 65'; Michel (yellow card) 113'	Report	Ibeagha (yellow card) 38'; Castellanos (yellow card) 82'; Chanot (yellow card) 90+2'; Moralez 90+6'; Tinnerholm (yellow card) 95'	Stadium: Exploria Stadium; Attendance: 7,227; Referee: Victor Rivas
	Penalties
	Akindele (penalty scored); Smith (penalty scored); Dwyer (penalty missed); Johnson (penalty scored); Powers (penalty scored); Rosell (penalty scored)		(penalty missed) Ring; (penalty scored) Castellanos; (penalty scored) Tinnerholm; (penalty scored) Parks; (penalty scored) Medina; (penalty missed) Chanot

== Statistics ==
=== Appearances and goals ===
Last updated on October 23, 2019

No.	Pos	Nat	Player	Total		MLS		MLS Cup Playoffs		U.S. Open Cup	
No.	Pos	Nat	Player	Apps	Goals	Apps	Goals	Apps	Goals	Apps	Goals
Goalkeepers
1	GK	(United States) USA	Sean Johnson	30	0	29	0	1	0	0	0
13	GK	(United States) USA	Luis Barraza	0	0	0	0	0	0	0	0
41	GK	(United States) USA	Brad Stuver	8	0	5	0	0	0	3	0
Defenders
2	DF	(United States) USA	Ben Sweat	20	0	13+5	0	0	0	2	0
3	DF	(Sweden) SWE	Anton Tinnerholm	34	1	30	1	1	0	2+1	0
4	DF	(Luxembourg) LUX	Maxime Chanot	34	0	31	0	1	0	2	0
5	DF	(United States) USA	Eric Miller	5	0	4+1	0	0	0	0	0
6	DF	(Peru) PER	Alexander Callens	25	0	24	0	1	0	0	0
22	DF	(Costa Rica) CRC	Rónald Matarrita	26	1	24	1	1	0	1	0
25	DF	(United States) USA	Joseph Scally	0	0	0	0	0	0	0	0
33	DF	(United States) USA	Sebastien Ibeagha	26	0	11+12	0	0	0	3	0
Midfielders
8	MF	(Finland) FIN	Alexander Ring	34	4	31	4	1	0	2	0
10	MF	(Argentina) ARG	Maximiliano Moralez	33	8	28+1	7	1	0	3	1
11	MF	(Argentina) ARG	Valentín Castellanos	34	11	23+7	11	1	0	1+2	0
12	MF	(Ghana) GHA	Ebenezer Ofori	21	2	14+6	2	0	0	1	0
14	MF	(United States) USA	Juan Pablo Torres	4	0	0+1	0	0	0	2+1	0
15	MF	(United States) USA	Tony Rocha	18	0	9+8	0	0	0	1	0
16	MF	(United States) USA	James Sands	19	0	18+1	0	0	0	0	0
17	MF	(Scotland) SCO	Gary Mackay-Steven	12	1	5+7	1	0	0	0	0
19	MF	(Paraguay) PAR	Jesús Medina	20	4	6+12	3	0	0	2	1
21	MF	(Colombia) COL	Dan Bedoya	2	0	0+1	0	0	0	1	0
55	MF	(United States) USA	Keaton Parks	26	3	14+8	1	1	0	2+1	2
80	MF	(United States) USA	Justin Haak	6	0	0+3	0	0	0	1+2	0
Forwards
9	FW	(Brazil) BRA	Héber	26	15	18+4	15	0+1	0	2+1	0
28	FW	(Romania) ROU	Alexandru Mitriță	32	13	24+5	12	1	0	1+1	1
29	FW	(Libya) LBA	Ismael Tajouri-Shradi	22	7	11+8	5	1	1	1+1	1
Players who have made an appearance or had a squad number this season but have left the club
18	GK	(United States) USA	Jeff Caldwell	0	0	0	0	0	0	0	0
17	FW	(United States) USA	Jonathan Lewis	6	0	2+4	0	0	0	0	0
