= 2018 New York City FC season =

New York City FC
2018 season
- Owner: City Football Group (80%); Yankee Global Enterprises (20%)
- CEO: Ferran Soriano
- Head coach: Patrick Vieira (until June 11); Domènec Torrent (after June 11)
- Stadium: Yankee Stadium; The Bronx, New York
- MLS: Conference: 3rd Overall: 7th
- MLS Cup Playoffs: Conference Semi-Finals
- U.S. Open Cup: Fourth Round
- Top goalscorer: League: David Villa (14); All: David Villa (15)
- Highest home attendance: 30,027 (July 8 vs. New York Red Bulls)
- Lowest home attendance: 18,584 (March 17 vs. Orlando City SC)
- Average home league attendance: 23,189
- Biggest win: 4 goals: NYC 4–0 RSL (April 11) NYCFC 4-0 CR (May 19) largest loss = 4 goals: NY 4–0 NYC (May 5)
Home colors	Away colors
- All statistics correct as of June 11, 2018.

The 2018 New York City FC season was the club's fourth season of competition and its fourth in the top tier of American soccer, Major League Soccer. New York City FC played its home games at Yankee Stadium in the New York City borough of The Bronx.

== Roster ==
As of October 28, 2018

Squad No.	Name	Nationality	Position(s)	Since	Date of birth (age)	Signed from	Games played	Goals scored
Goalkeepers
1	Sean Johnson	(United States)	GK	2016	May 31, 1989 (aged 29)	(United States) Chicago Fire	70	0
18	Jeff Caldwell	(United States)	GK	2018	February 20, 1996 (aged 22)	(United States) Virginia Cavaliers	0	0
24	Andre Rawls	(United States)	GK	2016	December 20, 1991 (aged 26)	(United States) Wilmington Hammerheads	0	0
41	Brad Stuver	(United States)	GK	2018	April 16, 1991 (aged 27)	(United States) Columbus	3	0
Defenders
2	Ben Sweat	(United States)	LB	2017	September 4, 1991 (aged 27)	(United States) Tampa Bay Rowdies	61	1
3	Anton Tinnerholm	(Sweden)	RB	2018	February 26, 1991 (aged 27)	(Sweden) Malmö	34	4
4	Maxime Chanot	(Luxembourg)	CB	2016	January 21, 1990 (aged 28)	(Belgium) Kortrijk	49	4
5	Cédric Hountondji	(Benin)	CB	2018	January 19, 1994 (aged 24)	(France) Ajaccio	2	0
6	Alexander Callens	(Peru)	CB	2017	May 4, 1992 (aged 26)	(Spain) Numancia	70	3
13	Saad Abdul-Salaam	(United States)	RB / LB	2018	September 8, 1991 (aged 27)	(United States) Kansas City	5	0
22	Rónald Matarrita	(Costa Rica)	LB	2016	July 9, 1994 (aged 24)	(Costa Rica) Alajuelense	67	3
33	Sebastien Ibeagha	(United States)	CB	2018	January 21, 1992 (aged 26)	(United States) San Antonio	27	0
25	Joseph Scally	(United States)	LB	2018	December 31, 2002 (aged 15)	(United States) New York City Academy	1	0
Midfielders
8	Alexander Ring	(Finland)	CM	2017	April 9, 1991 (aged 27)	(Germany) Kaiserslautern	63	2
10	Maximiliano Moralez	(Argentina)	AM	2017	February 27, 1987 (aged 31)	(Mexico) León	67	14
14	Kwame Awuah	(Canada)	CM	2017	December 2, 1995 (aged 22)	(United States) Connecticut	11	0
15	Tommy McNamara	(United States)	AM	2014	February 6, 1991 (aged 27)	(United States) D.C. United	89	14
12	Ebenezer Ofori	(Ghana)	DM	2018	July 1, 1995 (aged 24)	(Germany) VfB Stuttgart	28	1
16	James Sands	(United States)	DM	2017	July 6, 2000 (aged 18)	(United States) New York Soccer Club	5	0
19	Jesús Medina	(Paraguay)	CM	2018	April 30, 1997 (aged 21)	(Paraguay) Libertad	31	6
20	Eloi Amagat	(Spain)	DM	2018	May 21, 1985 (aged 33)	(Spain) Girona FC	9	0
21	Dan Bedoya	(Colombia)	AM	2018	February 13, 1994 (aged 24)	(United States) Long Island Rough Riders	0	0
30	Yangel Herrera	(Venezuela)	CM	2017	January 7, 1998 (aged 20)	(England) Manchester City	38	1
Strikers
7	David Villa (captain)	(Spain)	CF	2014	December 3, 1981 (age 44)	(Spain) Atlético Madrid	126	80
9	Jo Inge Berget	(Norway)	CF	2018	September 11, 1990 (age 35)	(Sweden) Malmö	24	4
17	Jonathan Lewis	(United States)	CF	2017	June 4, 1997 (age 28)	(United States) Akron	34	3
23	Rodney Wallace	(Costa Rica)	CF	2017	June 17, 1988 (age 37)	(Brazil) Sport Recife	46	5
29	Ismael Tajouri-Shradi	(Libya)	RW	2018	March 28, 1994 (aged 24)	Austria Wien	30	12
11	Valentín Castellanos	(Argentina)	AM	2018	March 18, 1998 (aged 20)	(Uruguay) Club Atlético Torque	10	1

== Player movement ==
=== In ===
Per Major League Soccer and club policies, terms of the deals do not get disclosed.

No.	Pos.	Player	Transferred from	Fee/notes	Date	Source
3	DF	(Sweden) Anton Tinnerholm	(Sweden) Malmö FF	Free transfer	December 13, 2017	
13	DF	(United States) Saad Abdul-Salaam	(United States) Sporting Kansas City	Traded Khiry Shelton for Abdul-Salaam	December 14, 2017	
41	GK	(United States) Brad Stuver	(United States) Columbus Crew	Traded 2019 MLS SuperDraft fourth round pick	December 14, 2017	
19	MF	(Paraguay) Jesús Medina	(Paraguay) Club Libertad	Undisclosed fee	December 31, 2017	
5	DF	(Benin) Cédric Hountondji	(France) GFC Ajaccio	Free transfer	January 11, 2018	
29	MF	(Libya) Ismael Tajouri	Austria Wien	Undisclosed fee	January 12, 2018	
32	FW	(Norway) Jo Inge Berget	(Sweden) Malmö FF	Free transfer	January 19, 2018	
33	DF	(United States) Sebastien Ibeagha	(United States) San Antonio FC	Free transfer	February 27, 2018	
20	MF	(Spain) Eloi Amagat	(Spain) Girona	Free transfer	July 25, 2018	
21	MF	(Colombia) Dan Bedoya	(United States) Long Island Rough Riders	Free transfer	August 9, 2018	

=== Out ===
No.	Pos.	Player	Transferred to	Fee/notes	Date	Source
21	MF	(Italy) Andrea Pirlo	—N/a	Retired	November 6, 2017	
27	DF	(United States) R. J. Allen	(United States) Orlando City SC	Traded to Orlando City for a third round pick in the 2018 MLS SuperDraft	November 27, 2017	
13	DF	(France) Frédéric Brillant	(United States) D.C. United	Traded to DC United for $75,000 in GAM and an international roster spot	November 27, 2017	
99	MF	(Panama) Miguel Camargo	(Panama) Chorrillo	Option declined	November 27, 2017	
52	DF	(Trinidad and Tobago) Shannon Gomez	(United States) Sacramento Republic	Option declined	November 27, 2017	
25	GK	(Norway) Eirik Johansen	(Norway) Sandefjord Fotball	Option declined	November 27, 2017	
5	MF	(United States) Mikey Lopez	(United States) San Antonio FC	Option declined	November 27, 2017	
—	DF	(Colombia) Jefferson Mena	(Ecuador) Barcelona	Option declined	November 27, 2017	
9	FW	(United States) Sean Okoli	(Finland) Landskrona BoIS	Option declined	November 27, 2017	
12	MF	(United States) John Stertzer	—	Option declined	November 27, 2017	
32	DF	(Slovenia) Andraž Struna	(Cyprus) Anorthosis Famagusta	Option declined	November 27, 2017	
3	DF	(United States) Ethan White	—	Option declined	November 27, 2017	
19	FW	(United States) Khiry Shelton	(United States) Sporting Kansas City	Traded to Sporting Kansas City for Saad Abdul-Salaam	December 14, 2017	
11	MF	(England) Jack Harrison	(England) Manchester City	Undisclosed fee	January 30, 2018	

=== Loans ===
Per Major League Soccer and club policies, terms of the deals do not get disclosed.

==== In ====
Date	Player	Position	Loaned from	Notes	Ref
February 14, 2017	(Venezuela) Yangel Herrera	MF	(England) Manchester City	Season-long loan	
February 21, 2018	(Ghana) Ebenezer Ofori	MF	(Germany) VFB Stuttgart	Season-long loan	
July 24, 2018	(Argentina) Valentín Castellanos	MF	(Argentina) Club Atlético Torque	Season-long loan	

=== Out on loan ===
No.	Position	Player	Nation
13	DF	USA	Saad Abdul-Salaam (on loan to Phoenix Rising until November 30, 2018)
17	FW	USA	Jonathan Lewis (GA, on loan to Louisville City until October 13, 2018)

=== Draft picks ===
Round	#	Position	Player	College/Club Team	Reference
1 (19)	—	GK	(United States) Jeff Caldwell	Virginia	
2 (42)	—	DF	(United States) AJ Paterson	Wright State	
3 (-)	—	DF	(United States) Alex Bumpus	Kentucky	

== Results ==
=== Preseason and Friendlies ===
January 31, 2018	Jacksonville Dolphins	2–5	New York City FC	Jacksonville, Florida
7:00 PM EST	Goal	Report	Wallace; Tinnerholm; Lewis	Stadium: Southern Oak Stadium

February 9, 2018	Los Angeles FC	1–1	New York City FC	Los Angeles
6:00 PM EST	Ureña 16'		Herrera (yellow card) (red card); Ring 56'	Stadium: Drake Stadium

February 10, 2018	LA Galaxy	3–0	New York City FC	Carson, California
10:00 PM EST	Kamara 10'; Hilliard-Arce 70'; Hušidić 90'	Report	Matarrita (red card) 42'	Stadium: StubHub Center

February 13, 2018	Club Atlético de San Luis	3–0	New York City FC	San Luis Potosí, Mexico
9:30 PM EST	Catalan 4'; Barraza 55' dos Santos 60'	Report		Stadium: Estadio Alfonso Lastras

February 22, 2018	New York City FC	1–2	Real Salt Lake	Orlando, Florida
3:30 PM EST

February 24, 2018	New York City FC	2–2	Montreal Impact	St. Petersburg, Florida
5:00 PM EST				Stadium: Al Lang Stadium

=== Major League Soccer season ===
==== League tables ====
===== Eastern Conference =====
Pos	Team	Pld	W	L	T	GF	GA	GD	Pts	Qualification
1	New York Red Bulls	34	22	7	5	62	33	+29	71	MLS Cup Conference Semifinals
2	Atlanta United FC	34	21	7	6	70	44	+26	69	MLS Cup Conference Semifinals
3	New York City FC	34	16	10	8	59	45	+14	56	MLS Cup Knockout Round
4	D.C. United	34	14	11	9	60	50	+10	51	MLS Cup Knockout Round
5	Columbus Crew	34	14	11	9	43	45	−2	51	MLS Cup Knockout Round
6	Philadelphia Union	34	15	14	5	49	50	−1	50	MLS Cup Knockout Round

Source: MLS

===== Overall =====
Pos	Team	Pld	W	L	T	GF	GA	GD	Pts
5	Los Angeles FC	34	16	9	9	68	52	+16	57
6	FC Dallas	34	16	9	9	52	44	+8	57
7	New York City FC	34	16	10	8	59	45	+14	56
8	Portland Timbers	34	15	10	9	54	48	+6	54
9	D.C. United	34	14	11	9	60	50	+10	51

Source: MLS
Rules for classification: 1) points; 2) total wins; 3) total goal differential; 4) total goals scored; 5) disciplinary points; 6) away goals scored; 7) away goal differential; 8) coin toss or drawing of lots

==== Results summary ====
Overall								Home						Away					
Pld	W	D	L	GF	GA	GD	Pts	W	D	L	GF	GA	GD	W	D	L	GF	GA	GD
34	16	8	10	59	45	+14	56	12	4	1	36	10	+26	4	4	9	23	35	−12

Last updated: October 28, 2018.
Source: MLS

==== Matches ====
March 4, 2018 1	Sporting Kansas City	0–2	New York City FC	Kansas City, Kansas
7:30 PM EST		Report	Medina (yellow card) 23' (goal) 53'; Moralez 32'; Ring (yellow card) 34'; Johnson (yellow card) 59'; Chanot (red card) 88'	Stadium: Children's Mercy Park; Attendance: 20,831; Referee: Mark Geiger

March 11, 2018 2	New York City FC	2–1	LA Galaxy	New York, New York
5:00 PM EDT	Tinnerholm 22'; Villa 33'	Report	J. Dos Santos (yellow card) 11' (goal) 60'; Cole (yellow card) 76' (yellow-red card) 85'	Stadium: Yankee Stadium; Attendance: 26,221; Referee: Ismail Elfath

March 17, 2018 3	New York City FC	2–0	Orlando City SC	New York, New York
3:30 PM EDT	Wallace (yellow card) 28'; Ring (yellow card) 54'; Tajouri 62'; Moralez 74'; McNamara (yellow card) 83'	Report	Higuita (yellow card) 27'; Laryea (yellow card) 90'	Stadium: Yankee Stadium; Attendance: 18,584; Referee: José Carlos Rivero

March 24, 2018 4	New England Revolution	2–2	New York City FC	Foxborough, Massachusetts
1:30 PM EDT	Fagúndez 11'; Caldwell (yellow card) 43'; Agudelo 63'; Dielna (yellow card) 70'	Report	Tajouri (yellow card) 34' (goal) 51', 75'; Abdul-Salaam (yellow card) 90+3'	Stadium: Gillette Stadium; Attendance: 12,376; Referee: Jair Marrufo

March 31, 2018 5	San Jose Earthquakes	1–2	New York City FC	San Jose, California
8:00 PM EDT	Quintana 3'; Godoy (yellow card) 29'	Report	Ofori (yellow card) 41'; Tinnerholm 49', (yellow card) 89'; Moralez 60', (yellow card) 90+2'; Callens (yellow card) 67'; Herrera (yellow card) 74'	Stadium: Avaya Stadium; Attendance: 18,000; Referee: Armando Villarreal

April 11, 2018 6	New York City FC	4–0	Real Salt Lake	New York, New York
7:00 PM EDT	Tajouri 12'; Moralez 30' (pen.); Berget 41'; Ofori 70'	Report	Beckerman (yellow card) 32'	Stadium: Yankee Stadium; Attendance: 18,603; Referee: Mark Geiger

April 15, 2018 7	Atlanta United FC	2–2	New York City FC	Atlanta
6:00 PM EDT	Garza 29'; McCann 56' (yellow card) 70'; Larentowicz (yellow card) 90+3'	Report	Ring (yellow card) 32' (goal) 73'; Villa 38' (pen.) (yellow card) 89'; Moralez (yellow card) 55'; Herrera (yellow card) 80'	Stadium: Mercedes-Benz Stadium; Attendance: 45,001; Referee: Allen Chapman

April 22, 2018 8	Portland Timbers	3–0	New York City FC	Portland, Oregon
6:00 PM EDT	Blanco 26'; Adi 38'; Mabiala 66'	Report	Ring (yellow card) 63'; Callens (yellow card) 90+2'	Stadium: Providence Park; Attendance: 21,144; Referee: Ted Unkel

April 29, 2018 9	New York City FC	3–1	FC Dallas	New York, New York
6:00 PM EDT	Medina 3'; Villa 36' (pen.) (yellow card) 69' (goal) 69'; Herrera (yellow card) 49'; Johnson (yellow card) 58'	Report	Lamah (yellow card) 8'; Mosquera 10'; Díaz (yellow card) 76'	Stadium: Yankee Stadium; Attendance: 22,115; Referee: Ismail Elfath

May 5, 2018 10 – Hudson River Derby	New York Red Bulls	4–0	New York City FC	Harrison, New Jersey
1:55 PM EDT	Gamarra 2'; Valot 4'; Wright-Phillips 35'; Parker (yellow card) 75'; Etienne 79'	Report	Ofori (yellow card) 64'	Stadium: Red Bull Arena; Attendance: 25,219; Referee: Kevin Stott

May 13, 2018 11	Los Angeles FC	2–2	New York City FC	Los Angeles
8:30 PM EDT	Ibeagha 23' (o.g.); Atuesta (yellow card) 28'; Miller (yellow card) 32'; Gaber (yellow card) 37'; Vela 66'	Report	Villa 13'; Herrera (yellow card) 16'; Sweat (yellow card) 62'; Tajouri 75'	Stadium: Banc of California Stadium; Attendance: 22,000; Referee: Chris Penso

May 19, 2018 12	New York City FC	4–0	Colorado Rapids	New York, New York
1:00 PM EDT	Villa 22', 74'; Matarrita 49'; Moralez 56'; McNamara (yellow card) 83'	Report	Nicholson (yellow card) 3'; Wilson (yellow card) 31'; Azira (yellow card) 46'; Smith (yellow card) 84'	Stadium: Yankee Stadium; Attendance: 21,494; Referee: Dave Gantar

May 25, 2018 13	Houston Dynamo	3–1	New York City FC	Houston
8:55 PM EDT	Fuenmayor (yellow card) 16', (goal) 21'; Martínez 69'; Elis 80', (yellow card) 80'	Report	Villa 6', (yellow card) 36'; Callens (yellow card) 89'	Stadium: BBVA Compass Stadium; Attendance: 18,123; Referee: Allen Chapman

June 2, 2018 14	New York City FC	3–0	Orlando City SC	New York, New York
7:30 PM EDT	Tajouri 35', 79'; Moralez (yellow card) 77', (goal) 87'	Report	Rosell (yellow card) 78'; Johnson (yellow card) 86'	Stadium: Yankee Stadium; Attendance: 22,103; Referee: Hilario Grajeda

June 9, 2018 15	New York City FC	1–1	Atlanta United FC	New York, New York
12:30 PM EDT	Sweat (yellow card) 35'; Berget (yellow card) 58'; Callens 77'	Report	Martínez 48'; González Pírez (yellow card) 64'; Williams (yellow card) 73'	Stadium: Yankee Stadium; Attendance: 25,628; Referee: Robert Sibiga

June 24, 2018 16	New York City FC	2–1	Toronto FC	New York, New York
5:00 PM EDT	Berget 51', 68'	Report	Vázquez 37'; Aketxe (yellow card) 27'	Stadium: Yankee Stadium; Attendance: 23,930; Referee: Ismail Elfath

June 30, 2018 17	Chicago Fire	3–2	New York City FC	Bridgeview, Illinois
8:00 PM EDT	Nikolić 6'; Bronico (yellow card) 10'; Katai 47', 52'; Sánchez (yellow card) 89'; Gordon (yellow card) 90+1'	Report	Ring (yellow card) 28'; Tajouri 36'; Berget 40'	Stadium: Toyota Park; Attendance: 15,204; Referee: Chris Penso

July 8, 2018 18 – Hudson River Derby	New York City FC	1–0	New York Red Bulls	New York, New York
7:00 PM EDT	Chanot (yellow card) 67'; Moralez 85'	Report	Muyl (yellow card) 83'	Stadium: Yankee Stadium; Attendance: 30,027; Referee: Baldomero Toledo

July 11, 2018 19	New York City FC	3–0	Montreal Impact	New York, New York
7:00 PM EDT	McNamara (yellow card) 11'; Tinnerholm (yellow card) 21'; Medina 60'; Matarrita 65'; Lewis 76'	Report	Edwards (yellow card) 23'	Stadium: Yankee Stadium; Attendance: 18,706; Referee: Alan Kelly

July 14, 2018 20	New York City FC	2–0	Columbus Crew	New York, New York
7:00 PM EDT	Medina 80'; Tinnerholm 90'	Report	Mensah (yellow card) 20'; Zardes (yellow card) 36'; Grella (yellow card) 82'; Sosa (red card) 90+3'	Stadium: Yankee Stadium; Attendance: 21,085; Referee: Armando Villarreal

July 26, 2018 21	Orlando City SC	0–2	New York City FC	Orlando, Florida
8:00 PM EDT	Dwyer (yellow card) 44'; Higuita (yellow card) 62'; O'Neill (red card) 83'	Report	Morález 40'; Tinnerholm 45+1'; McNamara (yellow card) 58'; Johnson (yellow card) 87'; Ring (yellow card) 90+5'	Stadium: Orlando City Stadium; Attendance: 23,790; Referee: Robert Sibiga

July 29, 2018 22	Seattle Sounders FC	3–1	New York City FC	Seattle
5:00 PM EDT	C. Roldan 36'; Svensson 51'; Shipp 86'	Boxscore	Medina 68'	Stadium: CenturyLink Field; Attendance: 39,528; Referee: Jair Marrufo

August 4, 2018 23	New York City FC	2–2	Vancouver Whitecaps FC	New York, New York
8:00 PM EDT	Medina 45+1'; Castellanos 46'; Matarrita (yellow card) 55'; Moralez (yellow card) 68'; Callens (yellow card) 89'	Report	Mezquida 22'; Hurtado 87'	Stadium: Yankee Stadium; Attendance: 20,802; Referee: José Carlos Rivero

August 12, 2018 24	Toronto FC	2–3	New York City FC	Toronto
4:00 PM EDT	Altidore (red card) 11'; Giovinco 27'; Osorio (yellow card) 35'; Bradley (yellow card) 40'; Vázquez 51'; Delgado (yellow card) 90+4'	Report	Villa 15'; Tajouri-Shradi 36', 88'; Ofori (yellow card) 37'; Ring (yellow card) 55'	Stadium: BMO Field; Attendance: 27,935; Referee: Hilario Grajeda

August 18, 2018 25	Philadelphia Union	2–0	New York City FC	Chester, Pennsylvania
7:00 PM EDT	Burke 57' (Dočkal); Ilsinho 76' (Dočkal); Creavalle (yellow card) 90'	Report	Tinnerholm (yellow card) 32'; Matarrita (red card) 90+5'	Stadium: Talen Energy Stadium; Attendance: 17,594; Referee: Fotis Bazakos

August 22, 2018 26 – Hudson River Derby	New York City FC	1–1	New York Red Bulls	New York, New York
7:00 PM EDT	Amagat (red card) 40'; Villa 52' (Berget, Moralez), (yellow card) 74'; Tinnerholm (yellow card) 61'; Ofori (red card) 73'	Report	Wright-Phillips 37' (Royer, Adams); Davis (yellow card) 44'; Lade (yellow card) 71'; Lawrence (yellow card) 77'; Ivan (yellow card) 82'	Stadium: Yankee Stadium; Attendance: 30,139; Referee: Ted Unkel

September 1, 2018 27	Columbus Crew	2–1	New York City FC	Columbus, Ohio
8:00 PM EDT	Harrison 61'; Meram 63'	Report	Wallace (yellow card) 45'; Tajouri 53'; Sweat (yellow card) 67'; Ibeagha (yellow card) 75'; Ring (yellow card) 90+3'	Stadium: MAPFRE Stadium; Attendance: 11,991; Referee: Alan Kelly

September 5, 2018 28	New York City FC	0–1	New England Revolution	New York, New York
7:00 PM EDT	Castellanos (yellow card) 47'; Ring (yellow card) 89'	Report	Machado (yellow card) 15'; Wright 71'; Penilla (yellow card) 89'; Bye (yellow card) 90'	Stadium: Yankee Stadium; Attendance: 18,884; Referee: Armando Villarreal

September 8, 2018 29	New York City FC	1–1	D.C. United	New York, New York
3:30 PM EDT	Villa 86'	Report	Birnbaum 58'	Stadium: Yankee Stadium; Referee: Kevin Stott

September 22, 2018 30	Montreal Impact	1–1	New York City FC	Montreal, Quebec
7:30 PM EDT	Azira 27', (yellow card) 48'; Taïder (yellow card) 90+3'	Report	Camacho 17' (o.g.); Callens (yellow card) 57'; Chanot (yellow card) 78'; Matarrita (yellow card) 79'	Stadium: Stade Saputo; Attendance: 20,801; Referee: Nima Saghafi

September 26, 2018 31	New York City FC	2–0	Chicago Fire	New York, New York
7:00 PM EDT	Tajouri-Shradi (yellow card) 27'; Ring 47'; Villa 51'	Report		Stadium: Yankee Stadium; Attendance: 21,582; Referee: Jair Marrufo

September 29, 2018 32	Minnesota United FC	2–1	New York City FC	Minneapolis
8:00 PM EDT	Rodríguez 20', 36'; Warner (yellow card) 45+2', (yellow card) 76' (red card); Calvo (yellow card) 54'; Shuttleworth (yellow card) 89'	Report	Ring (yellow card) 21'; Wallace 90+1'	Stadium: TCF Bank Stadium; Attendance: 21,926; Referee: José Carlos Rivero

October 21, 2018 33	D.C. United	3–1	New York City FC	Washington, D.C.
TBD PM EDT	Rooney 8', 74' (pen.); Acosta 24'	Report	Castellanos (yellow card) 66'; Villa 78'; Matarrita (yellow card) 90+4'	Stadium: Audi Field; Attendance: 20,249; Referee: Hilario Grajeda

October 28, 2018 34	New York City FC	3–1	Philadelphia Union	New York, New York
4:30 PM EDT	Chanot 8'; Trusty 10' (o.g.); Villa 34'	Report	Burke 14' (yellow card) 40'; Trusty (yellow card) 16'; Medunjanin (yellow card) 67'	Stadium: Yankee Stadium; Attendance: 26,441; Referee: Alan Kelly

=== MLS Cup Playoffs ===
October 31, 2018 Knockout round	New York City FC	3–1	Philadelphia Union	New York, New York
7:00 PM EDT	Tajouri 10'; Villa 26'; Chanot (yellow card) 55'; Sweat (yellow card) 71'; Moralez 78'	Report	McKenzie (yellow card) 24'; Medunjanin (yellow card) 73'; Burke 83'; Jones (yellow card) 86'	Stadium: Yankee Stadium; Attendance: 15,153; Referee: Robert Sibiga

November 4, 2018 Semifinal Leg 1	New York City FC	0–1	Atlanta United FC	New York, New York
7:30 PM EDT	Moralez (yellow card) 10'; Ring (yellow card) 41'	Report	Remedi (yellow card) 7', (goal) 37'; Villalba (yellow card) 48'; Martínez (yellow card) 78'	Stadium: Yankee Stadium; Attendance: 19,198; Referee: Kevin Stott

November 11, 2018 Semifinal Leg 2	Atlanta United FC	3–1 (4–1 agg.)	New York City FC	Atlanta, Georgia
5:00 PM EST	Martínez 25' (pen.), 83'; Almirón 42'; Escobar (yellow card) 44'; Robinson (yellow card) 61'	Report	Chanot (yellow card) 6', (goal) 45'; Herrera (yellow card) 40'; Moralez (yellow card) 74'; Callens (yellow card) 88'	Stadium: Mercedes-Benz Stadium; Attendance: 70,526; Referee: Mark Geiger

=== U.S. Open Cup ===
June 6, 2018 Fourth Round; Hudson River Derby	New York Red Bulls	4–0	New York City FC	Harrison, New Jersey
7:30 PM EDT	Bezecourt 2'; Davis (yellow card) 34'; Long 52'; Royer 87', 89'	Report		Stadium: Red Bull Arena; Attendance: 9,496; Referee: Fotis Bazakos

== Player statistics ==
=== Appearances and goals ===
No.	Pos	Nat	Player	Total		MLS		MLS Cup Playoffs		U.S. Open Cup	
No.	Pos	Nat	Player	Apps	Goals	Apps	Goals	Apps	Goals	Apps	Goals
Goalkeepers
1	GK	(United States) USA	Sean Johnson	35	0	32	0	3	0	0	0
18	GK	(United States) USA	Jeff Caldwell	0	0	0	0	0	0	0	0
41	GK	(United States) USA	Brad Stuver	3	0	2	0	0	0	1	0
Defenders
2	DF	(United States) USA	Ben Sweat	32	0	24+4	0	3	0	1	0
3	DF	(Sweden) SWE	Anton Tinnerholm	34	4	31	4	3	0	0	0
4	DF	(Luxembourg) LUX	Maxime Chanot	22	2	18	1	3	1	1	0
6	DF	(Peru) PER	Alexander Callens	34	1	31	1	3	0	0	0
22	DF	(Costa Rica) CRC	Rónald Matarrita	26	2	15+9	2	2	0	0	0
25	DF	(United States) USA	Joseph Scally	1	0	0	0	0	0	0+1	0
33	DF	(United States) USA	Sebastien Ibeagha	27	0	18+8	0	0	0	0+1	0
13	DF	(United States) USA	Saad Abdul-Salaam	5	0	3+1	0	0	0	1	0
5	DF	(Cameroon) CMR	Cédric Hountondji	2	0	0+1	0	0	0	1	0
Midfielders
8	MF	(Finland) FIN	Alexander Ring	33	2	29+1	2	3	0	0	0
10	MF	(Argentina) ARG	Maximiliano Moralez	35	9	32	8	3	1	0	0
30	MF	(Venezuela) VEN	Yangel Herrera	18	0	12+3	0	3	0	0	0
15	MF	(United States) USA	Tommy McNamara	11	0	4+6	0	0	0	1	0
14	MF	(Canada) CAN	Kwame Awuah	7	0	1+5	0	0	0	1	0
16	MF	(United States) USA	James Sands	4	0	3	0	0	0	0+1	0
20	MF	(Spain) ESP	Eloi Amagat	9	0	5+3	0	0+1	0	0	0
19	MF	(Paraguay) PAR	Jesús Medina	31	6	21+7	6	1+1	0	1	0
21	MF	(Colombia) COL	Dan Bedoya	1	0	0+1	0	0	0	0	0
12	MF	(Ghana) GHA	Ebenezer Ofori	29	1	21+6	1	0+1	0	1	0
Forwards
7	FW	(Spain) ESP	David Villa	26	15	20+3	14	3	1	0	0
23	FW	(Costa Rica) CRC	Rodney Wallace	18	1	9+9	1	0	0	0	0
29	FW	(Libya) LBY	Ismael Tajouri-Shradi	30	12	18+9	11	3	1	0	0
11	FW	(Argentina) ARG	Valentín Castellanos	9	1	5+3	1	0+1	0	0	0
17	FW	(United States) USA	Jonathan Lewis	15	1	0+14	1	0	0	1	0
9	FW	(Norway) NOR	Jo Inge Berget	24	4	19+4	4	0+1	0	0	0
