= Alexander Ring =

Finnish footballer (born 1991)

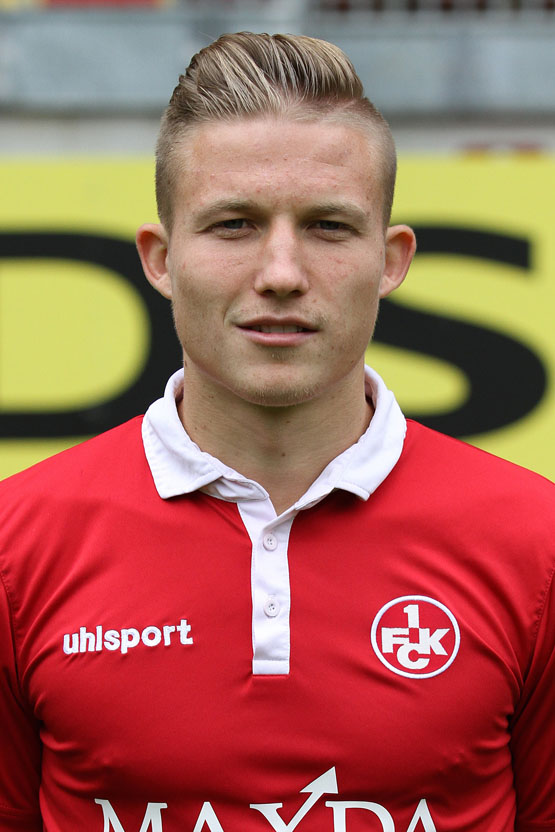
- Ring with 1. FC Kaiserslautern in 2015

Personal information
- Full name: Alexander Michael Ring
- Date of birth: 9 April 1991 (age 35)
- Place of birth: Helsinki, Finland
- Height: 5 ft 10 in (1.78 m)
- Position: Midfielder

Team information
- Current team: HJK
- Number: 4

Youth career
- 1995–1998: VfL Lannesdorf
- 1998–2008: Bayer Leverkusen
- 2001: Anderlecht
- 2009: HJK

Senior career*
Years	Team	Apps	(Gls)
2009–2010	Klubi-04	34	(9)
2010	→ Tampere United (loan)	4	(1)
2010–2013	HJK	27	(2)
2012–2013	→ Borussia Mönchengladbach (loan)	14	(0)
2013–2017	1. FC Kaiserslautern	76	(8)
2017–2020	New York City FC	114	(10)
2021–2024	Austin FC	127	(12)
2025–26	HJK	56	(17)

International career^{‡}
	Finland U17	6	(1)
2008	Finland U18	10	(0)
2009	Finland U19	7	(2)
2010	Finland U20	2	(1)
2011	Finland U21	3	(0)
2011–2018	Finland	44	(2)
Medal record
Finland national football team
Second place	Baltic Cup	2012
Third place	Baltic Cup	2014
- * Club domestic league appearances and goals as of 12 November 2026 ‡ National team caps and goals as of 2 September 2017

Alexander Michael Ring (born 9 April 1991) is a Finnish former professional footballer who ended his career as a midfielder for Veikkausliiga club HJK Helsinki.

== Early life ==
Ring was born in Finland and moved to Bonn, Germany, with his family when aged three, and grew up there and in Belgium. Ring went through the ranks of Bayer 04 Leverkusen before returning to Finland with his family in 2008, and joining HJK.

== Club career ==
=== HJK ===
He signed for HJK's reserve team Klubi-04 in 2009, and represented them until being promoted to the first team, and signed full professional contract with the club in August 2010. However, Ring was loaned out to Tampere United for the rest of that season. He returned to HJK after the season, and was established as the first choice holding midfielder for HJK in early 2011. On 26 September 2011, he signed a contract extension with HJK, keeping him in the Finnish capital until 2015. During December 2011, it was rumored that German Bundesliga side Borussia Mönchengladbach were interested in signing the young Finn for approximately €1 million.

==== Borussia Mönchengladbach (loan) ====
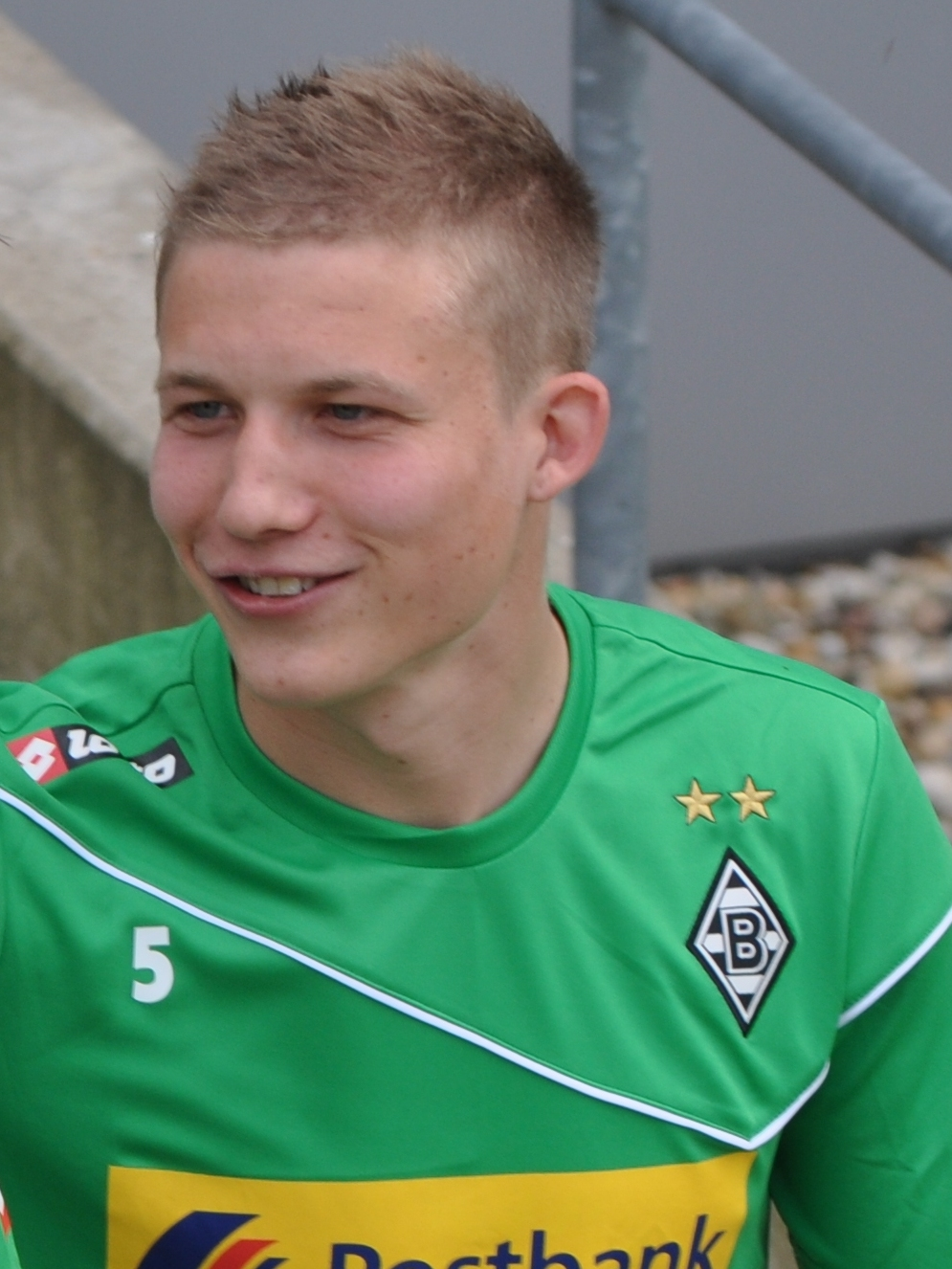
Ring with Mönchengladbach in 2012

On 5 January 2012, it was announced that Mönchengladbach had signed Ring on loan until the summer 2013, with having an option to buy at the end of the season. The estimated loan fee was reported to be €500,000. On 10 March 2012, Ring made his Bundesliga debut for Mönchengladbach against Freiburg, and on 21 August Ring scored his first goal for Mönchengladbach in a 3–1 defeat to Ukrainian Dynamo Kyiv in the first leg of 2012–13 UEFA Champions League's playoff-round. However, despite some encouraging displays for the club, Ring soon fell out of favour, and in February 2013 it was announced that Borussia would not use their option to buy the player.

=== 1. FC Kaiserslautern ===
In June 2013, he signed a contract with 1. FC Kaiserslautern to play in 2. Bundesliga. The clubs did not publish the transfer fee, but according to newspapers Kaiserslautern paid HJK Helsinki €500,000. After an encouraging start, and the club sacking of the first team coach Franco Foda in September 2013, he struggled to keep his position in the side. However, he was picked for the opening line-up in the cup games versus both Bayer Leverkusen and Bayern München. He scored his first goal for the club in August 2014 versus SV Sandhausen. Despite a lengthy lay-off due to a knee injury in the home game versus Fortuna Düsseldorf, the season 2014–15 turned out to be his best in Germany, with six goals in 24 league games. During the following seasons, Ring's performances were marred by minor injuries and constant head coach changes, that hindered his progress. In January 2017 the economically ailing club decided to let him move on before his contract would have expired.

=== New York City FC ===
Ring was purchased from Kaiserslautern by Major League Soccer (MLS) franchise New York City FC on 31 January 2017 for a reported fee of €300,000. Ring made himself an invaluable part of New York City's midfield during the 2017 season as he earned 29 appearances in the regular season. Despite New York City losing the Eastern Conference semifinals versus Columbus Crew, Ring's first season in MLS was a major personal success as he was elected the club's Newcomer of the Year. He scored his first MLS goal on 15 April 2018, vs. Atlanta United FC. In July 2018, he was selected to the MLS All-Stars side to play Juventus. On 7 February 2019, Ring was named the second captain in New York City FC's history, after David Villa's departure to Vissel Kobe in December.

=== Austin FC ===
On 17 December 2020, Ring was traded to new expansion franchise Austin FC in exchange for up to $1.25 million in General Allocation Money. He was subsequently selected as the captain of the team prior to Austin FC's first league match. On 3 January 2022, Ring signed a new contract with Austin, which also made him a Designated Player. He was stripped of the captaincy in February 2023. The club didn't announce a reason behind the decision. On 17 May 2023, during his seventh season in MLS, Ring reached the 200 league game appearance milestone.

On 17 November 2023, it was announced that Austin had exercised their option and his contract was extended for the 2024 season.

Ring was reinstated as the club captain during the latter part of the 2024 MLS season. On 5 November 2024 Austin announced that it had declined Ring's contract option, and he became a free agent.

=== HJK Helsinki ===
On 5 February 2025, Ring returned to Finland and signed a two-year deal with his former club HJK Helsinki, making his return after spending 13 years abroad. The season 2025 was a success to Ring, as he was awarded the Veikkausliiga Midfielder of the Year, and won the Finnish Cup, beating KuPS in the final.

The season 2026 brought a silver medal to HJK, and a runners-up medal in the Finnish Cup, both times losing out to Inter Turku. On 1 November 2026, Ring announced his retirement from the game after the 2026 Veikkausliiga season, at the age of 35.

== International career ==
Ring's convincing performances in the Finnish League Cup and the Veikkausliiga earned him a call-up to the new coach Mixu Paatelainen's first gathering of the Finland national football team in May 2011. He made his senior national team debut on 7 June 2011 in 5–0 defeat against Sweden. On 11 October 2011, Finnish star Roman Eremenko described Ring as a soon-to-be key player in the Finland national football team, saying: "I knew Alex when he came to the national team, but I hadn't seen any of his games before. When he came, it was immediately obvious that he is here to stay. He plays without fear." He established himself as a regular in the national team during Finland's qualification campaign for the UEFA Euro 2012. Ring scored his first goal for the national team on 26 March 2013 in Luxembourg in a match against Luxembourg. His second international goal came from a direct freekick vs. Iceland in a WC qualifier in September 2017.

In September 2018, Ring announced his retirement from international football.

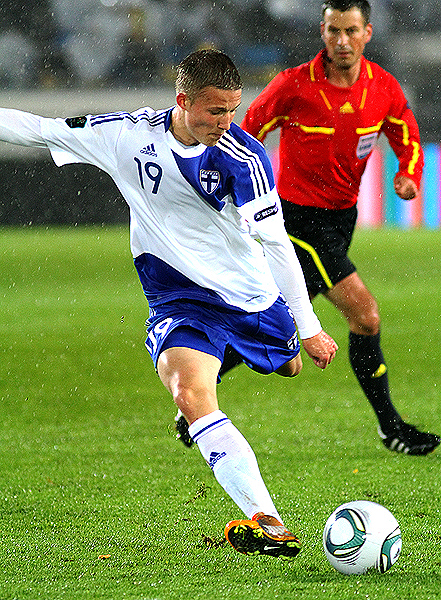
Ring with the national team in 2011

== Personal life ==
Ring doesn't have German citizenship, even though he lived most of his youth in Germany. In Maali! 3/2011 he stated: "I have not even applied for German citizenship. It has been obvious for me that I represent Finland".

Ring is married with two daughters.

In March 2018, Ring earned a U.S. green card which qualifies him as a domestic player for MLS roster purposes.

== Career statistics ==
=== Club ===
As of 26 August 2025

Appearances and goals by club, season and competition
Club	Season	League			National cup (Note: Includes Finnish Cup, DFB-Pokal, and U.S. Open Cup)		League cup (Note: Includes Finnish League Cup and MLS Cup Playoffs)		Continental (Note: Includes UEFA Champions League, UEFA Europa League)		Other		Total	
Club	Season	Division	Apps	Goals	Apps	Goals	Apps	Goals	Apps	Goals	Apps	Goals	Apps	Goals
Klubi 04	2009	Ykkönen	15	3	–		—		—		—		15	3
Klubi 04	2010	Ykkönen	19	6	—		–		—		—		19	6
Klubi 04	Total		34	9	—		–		—		—		34	9
Tampere United (loan)	2010	Veikkausliiga	4	1	0	0	0	0	0	0	—		4	1
HJK Helsinki	2010	Veikkausliiga	3	0	0	0	0	0	0	0	–		3	0
HJK Helsinki	2011	Veikkausliiga	24	2	3	1	8	3	6 (Note: Four appearances and one goal in UEFA Champions League, two appearances in UEFA Europa League)	2	–		41	8
HJK Helsinki	Total		27	2	3	1	8	3	6	2	0	0	44	8
Borussia Mönchengladbach (loan)	2011–12	Bundesliga	8	0	0	0	—		—		—		8	0
Borussia Mönchengladbach (loan)	2012–13	Bundesliga	6	0	1	0	—		6 (Note: Two appearances and one goal in UEFA Champions League, four appearances in UEFA Europa League)	1	—		13	1
Borussia Mönchengladbach (loan)	Total		14	0	1	0	—		6	1	—		21	1
1. FC Kaiserslautern	2013–14	2. Bundesliga	21	0	3	0	—		—		—		24	0
1. FC Kaiserslautern	2014–15	2. Bundesliga	24	6	2	0	—		—		—		26	6
1. FC Kaiserslautern	2015–16	2. Bundesliga	21	2	1	0	—		—		—		22	2
1. FC Kaiserslautern	2016–17	2. Bundesliga	10	0	1	0	—		—		—		11	0
1. FC Kaiserslautern	Total		76	8	7	0	—		—		—		83	8
New York City FC	2017	MLS	29	0	1	0	2	0	—		—		32	0
New York City FC	2018	MLS	30	2	0	0	3	0	—		—		33	2
New York City FC	2019	MLS	31	4	2	0	1	0	—		—		34	4
New York City FC	2020	MLS	24	4	—		—		3 (Note: Includes CONCACAF Champions Cup)	0	2 (Note: Two appearances in MLS is Back Tournament knockout stage)	0	27	4
New York City FC	Total		114	10	3	0	6	0	3	0	2	0	128	10
Austin FC	2021	MLS	31	4	—		—		—		—		31	4
Austin FC	2022	MLS	34	4	1	0	3	0	—		—		38	4
Austin FC	2023	MLS	28	2	1	0	0	0	1	0	1 (Note: Appearance(s) in Leagues Cup)	0	31	2
Austin FC	2024	MLS	34	2	—		—		—		3	1	37	3
Austin FC	Total		127	12	2	0	3	0	1	0	4	1	137	13
HJK Helsinki	2025	Veikkausliiga	20	12	1	1	4	0	4 (Note: Appearances in UEFA Conference League)	0	–		29	13
Career total			413	54	17	2	21	3	22	3	6	1	477	63

=== International ===
As of matches played on 2 September 2017

Appearances and goals by national team and year
National team	Year	Apps	Goals
Finland
Finland	2011	6	0
Finland	2012	7	0
Finland	2013	9	1
Finland	2014	7	0
Finland	2015	5	0
Finland	2016	8	0
Finland	2017	2	1
Total		44	2

Scores and results list Finland's goal tally first, score column indicates score after each Ring goal.

List of international goals scored by Alexander Ring
No.	Date	Venue	Opponent	Score	Result	Competition
1	26 March 2013	Stade Josy Barthel, Luxembourg City, Luxembourg	Luxembourg	1–0	3–0	Friendly
2	2 September 2017	Tampere Stadium, Tampere, Finland	Iceland	1–0	1–0	2018 FIFA World Cup qualification

== Honours ==
HJK

- Veikkausliiga: 2010, 2011
- Finnish Cup: 2011, 2025

Individual

- Veikkausliiga Rookie of the Year: 2011
- Veikkausliiga Player of the Month: September 2011, May 2025,
- MLS All-Star: 2018
- Veikkausliiga Midfielder of the Year: 2025
