= Anton Tinnerholm =

Swedish footballer

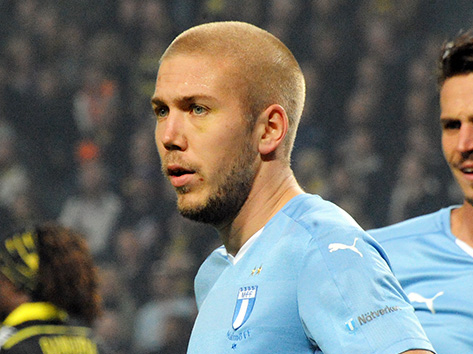
- Tinnerholm playing for Malmö FF in 2015

Personal information
- Full name: Anton Lars Tinnerholm
- Date of birth: 26 February 1991 (age 35)
- Place of birth: Linköping, Sweden
- Height: 1.76 m (5 ft 9 in)
- Position: Right-back

Youth career
- Brokinds IF
- –2007: IK Östria Lambohov

Senior career*
Years	Team	Apps	(Gls)
2008–2014	Åtvidabergs FF	108	(6)
2014–2017	Malmö FF	98	(6)
2018–2022	New York City FC	119	(9)
2023–2025	Malmö FF	7	(0)
Total		332	(21)

International career
2015–2018	Sweden	9	(0)
- * Club domestic league appearances and goals

Anton Lars Tinnerholm (born 26 February 1991) is a Swedish former professional footballer who played as a defender. Starting off his career with Åtvidabergs FF in 2008, he went on to represent Malmö FF and New York City FC before retiring at Malmö FF in 2025. A full international between 2015 and 2018, he won nine caps for the Sweden national team.

== Career ==
=== Åtvidabergs FF ===
In his early years Tinnerholm played for local Östergötland clubs Brokinds IF and IK Östria Lambohov before moving to play professionally for Åtvidabergs FF, one of the larger clubs in the county. Tinnerholm moved to Åtvidaberg in 2008 but didn't make his first league appearance for the club until the year after. After making twelve appearances for Åtvidaberg in Sweden's second tier Superettan, in 2009, he played a much smaller role and played only two matches for the club after they had been promoted to the 2010. Back in Superettan again for the 2011 season Tinnerholm played regularly and appeared in 28 of 30 matches for the club as they won the league, and thus also promotion back to Allsvenskan. Tinnerholm continued to play regularly for the club as he made 25 appearances in 2012 and 29 appearances in 2013 as the club enjoyed mid table results.

=== Malmö FF ===
Tinnerholm signed for reigning Swedish champions Malmö FF on 11 July 2014. The transfer was completed on 15 July 2014 when the Swedish transfer window opened. Tinnerholm wore the number 3 jersey, previously worn by Miiko Albornoz who left the club after playing at the 2014 FIFA World Cup. In the 2014 season Tinnerholm played regularly for the club, becoming league champions and qualifying for the group stage of the 2014–15 UEFA Champions League. He scored his first league goal for Malmö FF against his former club Åtvidaberg on 1 November 2014 in a 2–1 loss.

=== New York City ===
On 13 December 2017, Tinnerholm signed with MLS side New York City FC on a free transfer. He scored his first goal for the club on 11 March 2018 against LA Galaxy and his second goal on 31 March 2018 against the San Jose Earthquakes. He left New York at the end of the 2022 season.

=== Return to Malmö and retirement ===
On 14 November 2022, it was officially announced that Tinnerholm would return to Malmö FF on a free transfer, signing a four-year contract with the club in the process and being registered since January 2023. He announced his immediate retire from professional football on 2 May 2025 after having suffered from a persistent groin injury throughout his second spell at Malmö FF, limiting his total Allsvenskan appearances to only seven games between 2023 and 2025.

== Personal life ==
In February 2019, Tinnerholm earned a U.S. green card which qualifies him as a domestic player for MLS roster purposes.

== Career statistics ==
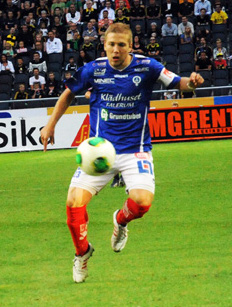
Tinnerholm playing for Åtvidaberg in 2013

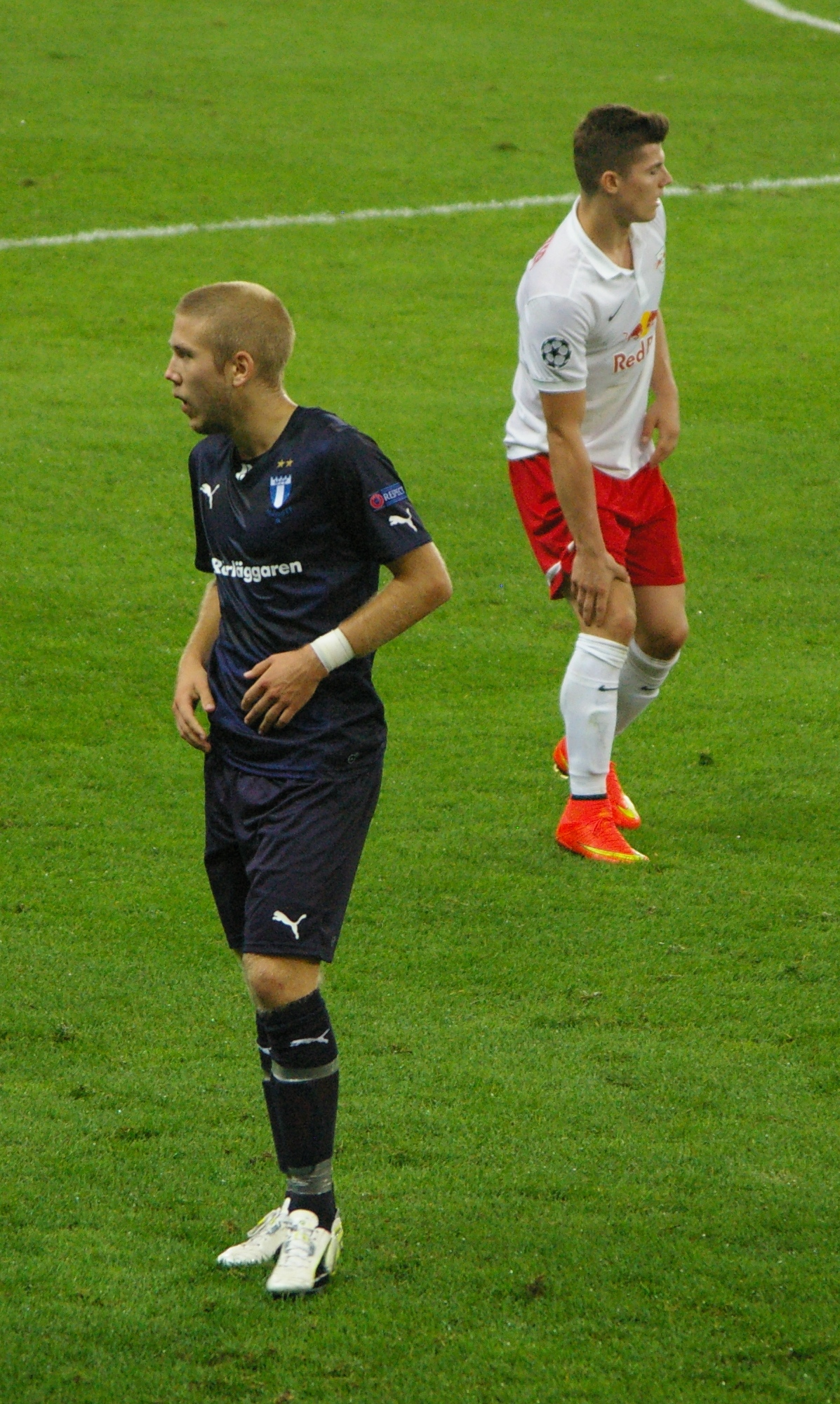
Tinnerholm playing for Malmö FF in a Champions League playoff match against Red Bull Salzburg in 2014

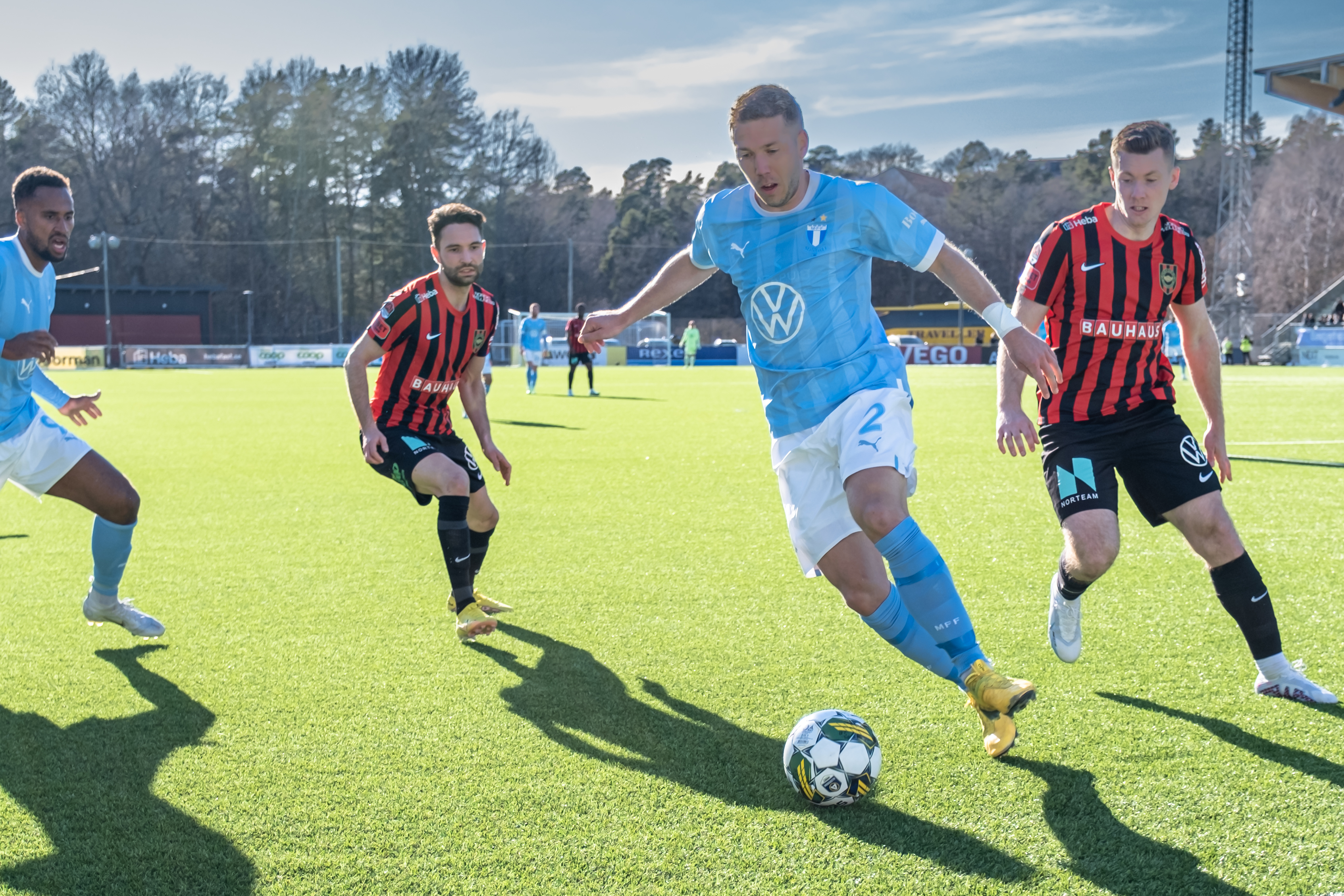
Tinnerholm playing for Malmö FF in 2023

=== Club ===
Appearances and goals by club, season and competition
Club	Season	League			National Cup		Continental		Other		Total	
Club	Season	Division	Apps	Goals	Apps	Goals	Apps	Goals	Apps	Goals	Apps	Goals
Åtvidabergs FF	2009	Superettan	12	0	1	0	—		—		13	0
Åtvidabergs FF	2010	Allsvenskan	2	0	1	0	—		—		3	0
Åtvidabergs FF	2011	Superettan	28	4	2	0	—		—		30	4
Åtvidabergs FF	2012	Allsvenskan	25	1	3	0	—		—		28	1
Åtvidabergs FF	2013	Allsvenskan	29	1	2	0	—		—		31	1
Åtvidabergs FF	2014	Allsvenskan	12	0	0	0	—		—		12	0
Åtvidabergs FF	Total		108	6	9	0	0	0	0	0	117	6
Malmö FF	2014	Allsvenskan	14	1	1	0	10 (Note: Appearance(s) in UEFA Champions League)	0	1 (Note: Appearance(s) in Svenska Supercupen)	0	26	1
Malmö FF	2015	Allsvenskan	28	0	5	0	12	1	—		45	1
Malmö FF	2016	Allsvenskan	29	0	7	0	—		—		36	0
Malmö FF	2017	Allsvenskan	27	5	2	0	2	0	—		31	5
Malmö FF	Total		98	6	15	0	24	1	1	0	138	7
New York City FC	2018	MLS	31	4	0	0	—		3 (Note: Appearance(s) in MLS Cup Playoffs)	0	34	4
New York City FC	2019	MLS	30	1	3	0	—		1	0	34	1
New York City FC	2020	MLS	23	4	—		4 (Note: Appearance(s) in CONCACAF Champions League)	0	3 (Note: Two appearances in MLS is Back Tournament knockout stage, one appearance in MLS Cup Playoffs)	0	30	4
New York City FC	2021	MLS	25	0	—		0	0	0	0	25	0
New York City FC	2022	MLS	10	0	0	0	0	0	2	0	12	0
New York City FC	Total		119	9	3	0	4	0	9	0	135	9
Malmö FF	2023	Allsvenskan	4	0	4	0	—		—		8	0
Malmö FF	2024	Allsvenskan	3	0	0	0	0	0	—		3	0
Malmö FF	2025	Allsvenskan	0	0	0	0	—		—		0	0
Malmö FF	Total		7	0	4	0	0	0	0	0	11	0
Career total			332	21	31	0	28	1	10	0	401	22

=== International ===
Appearances and goals by national team and year
National team	Year	Apps	Goals
Sweden	2015	4	0
Sweden	2016	2	0
Sweden	2017	1	0
Sweden	2018	2	0
Total		9	0

== Honours ==
Åtvidabergs FF

- Superettan: 2011

Malmö FF

- Allsvenskan: 2014, 2016, 2017, 2023, 2024
- Svenska Supercupen: 2014

New York City FC

- MLS Cup: 2021

Individual

- Allsvenskan defender of the year: 2017
