= Sebastien Ibeagha =

American soccer player (born 1992)

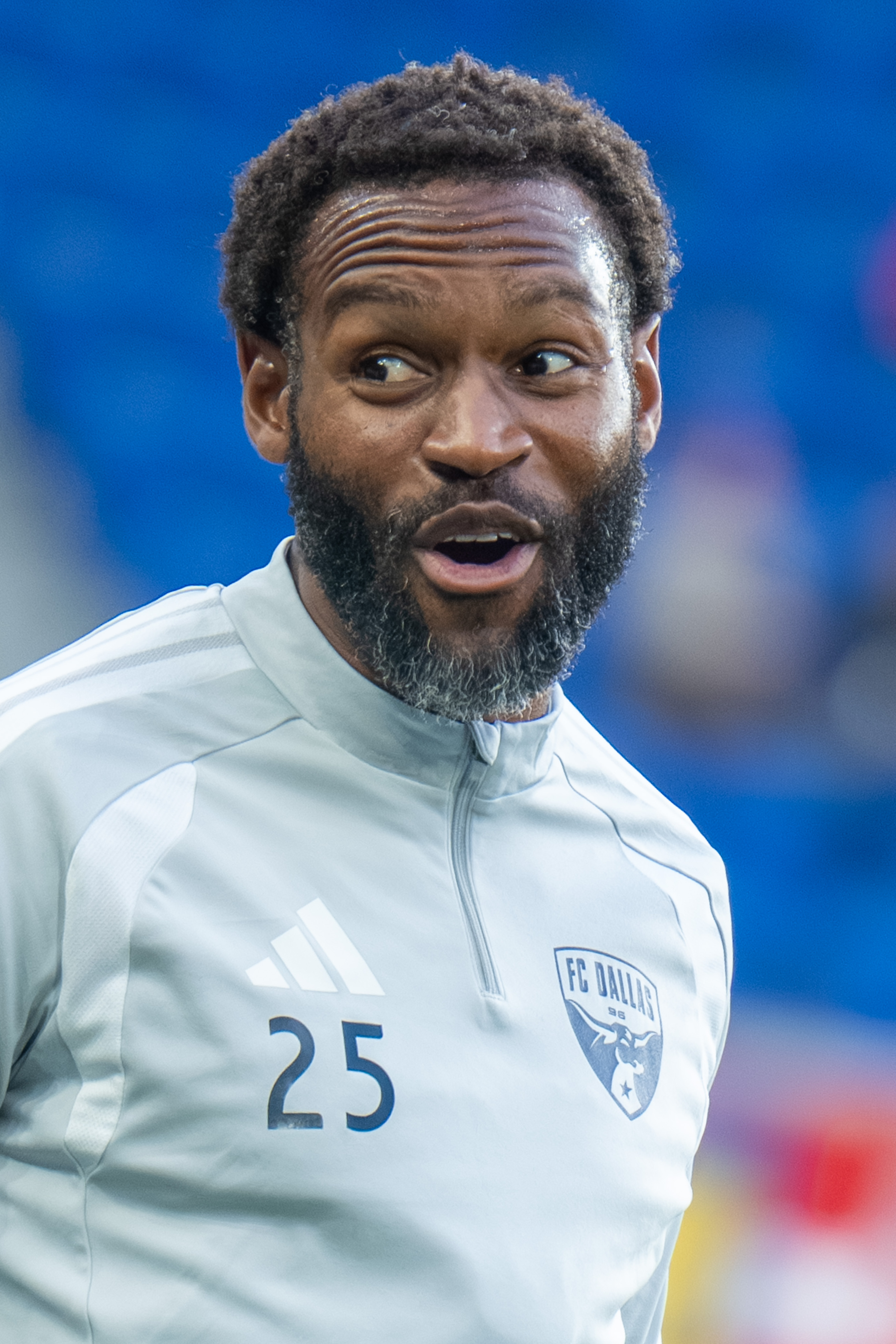
- Ibeagha with FC Dallas in 2026

Personal information
- Full name: Sebastien Uchechukwu Ibeagha
- Date of birth: January 21, 1992 (age 34)
- Place of birth: Warri, Nigeria
- Height: 6 ft 2 in (1.88 m)
- Position: Defender

Team information
- Current team: FC Dallas
- Number: 25

Youth career
- 2008–2010: Houston Dynamo

College career
Years	Team	Apps	(Gls)
2010–2013	Duke Blue Devils	70	(8)

Senior career*
Years	Team	Apps	(Gls)
2011–2013	Carolina Dynamo	25	(1)
2013–2015	AC Horsens	17	(0)
2014	→ FC Fredericia (loan)	16	(1)
2015	→ Fram Reykjavík (loan)	19	(1)
2016	Houston Dynamo	0	(0)
2016	→ Rio Grande Valley FC (loan)	6	(0)
2016	→ Rayo OKC (loan)	19	(2)
2017	San Antonio	30	(0)
2018–2021	New York City FC	64	(0)
2021–2022	Los Angeles FC	30	(0)
2023–	FC Dallas	81	(4)

International career
2010–2011	United States U20	7	(0)
- * Club domestic league appearances and goals as of March 15, 2025

Sebastien Uchechukwu Ibeagha (born January 21, 1992) is a professional soccer player who plays as a defender for Major League Soccer club FC Dallas. Born in Nigeria, he represented the United States national under-20 team.

== Career ==
=== Youth, college, and semi-professional ===
Ibeagha joined the Houston Dynamo academy after he and his family moved to Houston, Texas from Oklahoma City, Oklahoma. He was named as the 2009 Dynamo Academy Player of the Year and trained with the Dynamo first team during the summer of 2009.

Ibeagha played four years of college soccer at Duke University from 2010 to 2013. He made 70 appearances for the Blue Devils, scoring eight goals and assisting on three others. Ibeagha was twice named first team All-ACC and was named as the 2012 ACC Defensive Player of the Year. He was named to one of the National Soccer Coaches Association of America All-South Region teams in all of his seasons with Duke. While at Duke, Ibeagha was offered multiple first team contracts by Houston, but he declined them due to his father wanting him to finish school and Ibeagha preferring to try to make a career in Europe.

While at college, Ibeagha also appeared for Premier Development League side Carolina Dynamo.

=== Professional ===
==== AC Horsens ====
After college, Ibeagha forgoed a homegrown contract with the Houston Dynamo and instead signed with Danish side AC Horsens. He made his AC Horsens debut on March 15, 2014, in a 5–0 victory over Vejle Boldklub in the Danish Cup. Ibeagha would make his league debut for AC Horsens on March 23 in a 0–0 draw with Vejle Boldklub. He started 17 out of a possible 18 games for AC Horsens in his first season with the club.

Ibeagha made 2 appearances with AC Horsens in the 2014–15 season before being sent on loan to FC Fredericia. He made his Fredercia debut on August 10, 2014, in a 2–0 defeat to Akademisk Boldklub. On October 5, Fredericia played Ibeagha's parent club AC Horsens to a 3–3 draw, with Ibeagha scoring an own-goal. Ibeagha scored his first goal on October 26 in a 3–1 defeat to Vejle Boldklub.

Ibeagha returned to AC Horsens for the second half of the 2014–15 season, but he didn't feature with the team. He was loaned to Icelandic club Fram Reykjavik for Fram's 2015 season. He made his debut for Fram on May 23, 2015, in a 0–1 loss to Knattspyrnufélag Fjarðabyggðar. Ibeagha scored his first goal for Fram on August 22 in a 2–2 draw with Throttur Reykjavik.

==== Houston Dynamo ====
On January 26, 2016, Ibeagha signed with his former youth club Houston Dynamo. He struggled to find game time, so Ibeagha was sent to Houston's USL affiliate club Rio Grande Valley FC. He would make six appearances with the Torros before being loaned to NASL side Rayo OKC on July 12, 2016. Ibeagha made his debut for Rayo OKC on July 23 in a 1–0 defeat to Puerto Rico FC. He scored his first goal for Rayo OKC on September 10 in a 3–2 win over the Jacksonville Armada. Ibeagha helped Rayo OKC qualify for the 2016 NASL Playoffs. He made zero competitive appearances in his time with Houston.

==== San Antonio FC ====
On February 3, 2017, Ibeagha signed with USL club San Antonio FC. He made his SAFC debut on March 26 in a 1–0 win over Rio Grande Valley FC. He was named to the USL team of the week for Week 1. Ibeagha and San Antonio recorded the second longest shutout streak in USL history between April 28 to June 17 when they went 672 minutes without conceding a goal. Ibeagha helped San Antonio finish second in the Western Conference by anchoring defense that led the league with 15 clean sheets and conceded a league-low 24 goals in 2017. His 190 clearances were the most by any USL player for 2017. Ibeagha was named as the 2017 USL Defender of the Year and was also named to the 2017 USL All-League First Team.

==== New York City FC ====
Ibeagha signed with Major League Soccer side New York City FC on February 27, 2018, after training with the team during pre-season. He made his MLS debut in NYCFC's first game of the 2018 season, coming on as a sub in a 2–0 win against Sporting Kansas City. Ibeagha got the start in their next game, a 2–1 win over the LA Galaxy. After only featuring as a sub for three of the next six games, Ibeagha established himself by appearing in 26 league games and starting 18 of them. He helped qualify NYCFC for the 2018 MLS Cup Playoffs, their third straight season qualifying for the postseason.

After not appearing in the first five games of the 2019 season, Ibeagha started against the Montreal Impact and helped NYCFC keep a clean sheet and earn a 0–0 draw. He made 23 MLS appearances on the season, 11 being starts, to help NYCFC finish first place in the Eastern Conference and finish with the second-best defensive record in the conference. However, he did not feature in the playoffs.

==== Los Angeles FC ====
On August 6, 2021, Ibeagha was acquired by Los Angeles FC from NYCFC in exchange for $150,000 in General Allocation Money.

==== FC Dallas ====
On December 5, 2022, Ibeagha was signed by FC Dallas three weeks after his contract with Los Angeles FC expired.

=== International ===
Ibeagha has represented the United States at the under-20 level.

== Personal ==
Born in Nigeria, Ibeagha and his family moved to the United States in 2001. Ibeagha attended Hightower High School in Missouri City, Texas. He played varsity soccer and football in high school. Ibeagha's brother, Christian Ibeagha, currently plays for the Oklahoma City Energy.

== Career statistics ==
=== Club ===
As of match played November 7, 2021

Club	Season	League			National cup		Continental		Other		Total	
Club	Season	Division	Apps	Goals	Apps	Goals	Apps	Goals	Apps	Goals	Apps	Goals
Carolina Dynamo	2011	USL PDL	9	0	1	0	—		0	0	10	0
Carolina Dynamo	2012	USL PDL	11	0	—		—		0	0	11	0
Carolina Dynamo	2013	USL PDL	5	1	—		—		0	0	5	1
Carolina Dynamo	Total		25	1	1	0	0	0	0	0	26	1
AC Horsens	2013–14	Danish 1st Division	15	0	2	0	—		—		17	0
AC Horsens	2014–15	Danish 1st Division	2	0	0	0	—		—		2	0
AC Horsens	Total		17	0	2	0	0	0	0	0	19	0
FC Fredericia (loan)	2014–15	Danish 1st Division	16	1	0	0	—		—		16	1
Fram Reykjavík (loan)	2015	1. deild karla	19	1	1	0	—		—		20	1
Houston Dynamo	2016	Major League Soccer	0	0	0	0	—		—		0	0
Rio Grande Valley FC (loan)	2016	United Soccer League	6	0	—		—		—		6	0
Rayo OKC (loan)	2016	North American Soccer League	18	2	0	0	—		1 (Note: Appearance in North American Soccer League Playoffs)	0	19	2
San Antonio FC	2017	United Soccer League	30	0	1	0	—		2 (Note: Appearances in United Soccer League Playoffs)	0	33	0
New York City FC	2018	Major League Soccer	26	0	1	0	—		0	0	27	0
New York City FC	2019	Major League Soccer	23	0	3	0	—		0	0	26	0
New York City FC	2020	Major League Soccer	7	0	—		2 (Note: Appearances in CONCACAF Champions League)	0	1 (Note: Appearance in MLS Cup Playoffs)	0	10	0
New York City FC	2021	Major League Soccer	8	0	—		—		—		8	0
Total			64	0	4	0	2	0	1	0	71	0
Los Angeles FC	2021	Major League Soccer	13	0	—						13	0
Career total			208	5	9	0	2	0	4	0	223	5

== Honors ==
Los Angeles FC

- MLS Cup: 2022
- Supporters' Shield: 2022

Individual

- USL Defender of the Year: 2017
- USL All-League First Team: 2017
- ACC Defensive Player of the Year: 2012
- First Team All-ACC: 2012, 2013
- Second Team All-ACC: 2011
- All-ACC Freshman Team: 2010
- NSCAA All-American Third Team: 2013
- NSCAA All-South Region First Team: 2012, 2013
- NSCAA All-South Region Second Team: 2011
- NSCAA All-South Region Third Team: 2010
- Dynamo Academy Player of the Year: 2009
