= Ebenezer Ofori =

Ghanaian footballer (born 1995)

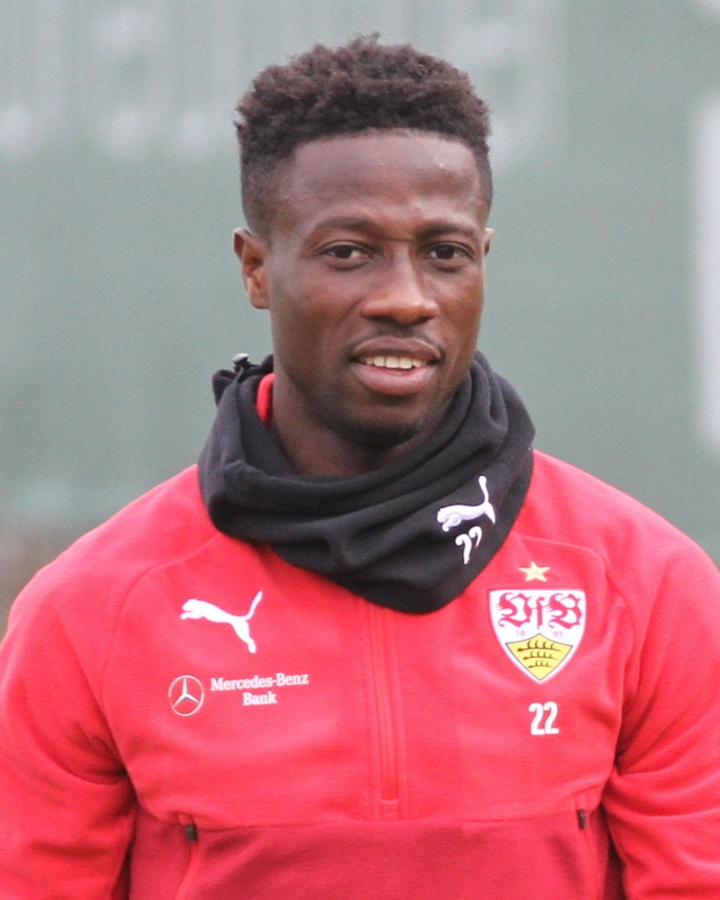
- Ofori with VfB Stuttgart in 2017

Personal information
- Full name: Ebenezer Ofori
- Date of birth: 1 July 1995 (age 31)
- Place of birth: Kumasi, Ghana
- Height: 1.72 m (5 ft 7 1/2 in)
- Position: Midfielder

Team information
- Current team: FC Atyrau
- Number: 15

Youth career
- –2012: New Edubiase United

Senior career*
Years	Team	Apps	(Gls)
2012–2013	New Edubiase United	17	(4)
2013–2016	AIK	81	(4)
2017–2020	VfB Stuttgart	10	(0)
2018–2019	→ New York City (loan)	47	(3)
2020–2022	AIK	32	(0)
2022	→ Vejle (loan)	14	(0)
2022–2024	Vejle	49	(0)
2025	FK Žalgiris	20	(0)
2026–	FC Atyrau	12	(0)

International career^{‡}
2013	Ghana U20	7	(0)
2017–2019	Ghana	9	(1)
- * Club domestic league appearances and goals as of 1 November 2026 ‡ National team caps and goals as of 11 March 2026

Ebenezer Ofori (born 1 July 1995) is a Ghanaian professional footballer who plays as a midfielder for Kazakh club FC Atyrau.

== Club career ==
=== New Edubiase ===
Ofori started his career in his native country Ghana, playing in the Ghana Premier League for Ashanti-based side New Edubiase United. He played 17 league matches and scored 4 goals in his debut top flight season. The club was entitled to a percentage on future transfers after selling him to AIK in 2013.

=== AIK ===
In August 2013, Ofori joined Swedish side AIK on a three-and-a-half-year deal. He was presented to the fans on 3 August 2013, at half-time during the club's 2–1 win over Elfsborg at the Friends Arena in the Allsvenskan. He made his debut for AIK against Manchester United in a friendly 2013. He made his official debut on 25 August 2018, playing the full 90 minutes in a 1–0 loss against Halmstad. During his first stint with the club he played 101 competition matches for AIK between 2013 and 2016.

=== VfB Stuttgart ===
The Ghanaian midfielder completed his move to VfB Stuttgart in the 2. Bundesliga during the January transfer window on 31 January 2017, after the Africa Cup of Nations with the Black Stars. He helped Stuttgart to emerge champions of the German second-tier league and secure promotion back to the German top flight.

=== New York City ===
On 21 February 2018, Ofori joined MLS side New York City FC on loan until the end of the 2018 MLS season. He played 28 league matches in his debut season. His loan was extended to continue for the 2019 MLS season. In the second season he played 20 league matches.

=== Return to AIK ===
On 9 January 2020 it was announced that he will rejoin AIK for the 2020 Allsvenskan season on a permanent deal.

=== Vejle ===
On 13 January 2022, Ofori was loaned out to Danish Superliga club Vejle Boldklub until July 2022. On 15 June 2022, Ofori moved to Vejle on a permanent basis and signed a two-year contract. On 3 December 2024, Vejle Boldklub and Ofori agreed to terminate the contract due to lack of playing time.

=== Žalgiris ===
On 28 March 2025 Lithuanian Žalgiris Club announced about new player. On 16 April 2025 Ebenezer Ofori made his debut match in A Lyga against Hegelmann.

== International career ==
Ofori was called up to the Ghana national football team for the 2017 Africa Cup of Nations. He made his debut for Ghana in a 1–0 loss to Burkina Faso national football team on 4 February 2017. He scored in his second game for the Black Stars in an African Cup of Nations qualifier against Ethiopia.

=== International goals ===
Scores and results list Ghana's goal tally first.

No	Date	Venue	Opponent	Score	Result	Competition
1.	11 June 2017	Baba Yara Stadium, Kumasi, Ghana	Ethiopia	3–0	5–0	2019 Africa Cup of Nations qualification

== Club statistics ==
As of 6 October 2023

Appearances and goals by club, season and competition
Club	Season	League			National Cup		Continental		Total	
Club	Season	Division	Apps	Goals	Apps	Goals	Apps	Goals	Apps	Goals
New Edubiase	2012–13	Premier League	17	4	—		—		17	4
AIK	2013	Allsvenskan	4	0	1	0	—		5	0
AIK	2014	Allsvenskan	23	1	1	0	2	0	26	1
AIK	2015	Allsvenskan	27	0	4	0	5	1	36	1
AIK	2016	Allsvenskan	27	3	1	0	6	0	34	3
VfB Stuttgart	2016–17	2. Bundesliga	9	0	0	0	—		9	0
VfB Stuttgart	2017–18	Bundesliga	1	0	1	0	—		2	0
VfB Stuttgart	Total		10	0	1	0	0	0	11	0
New York City (loan)	2018	Major League Soccer	28	1	1	0	—		29	1
New York City (loan)	2019	Major League Soccer	20	2	1	0	—		21	2
New York City (loan)	Total		48	3	2	0	0	0	50	3
AIK	2019	Allsvenskan	0	0	4	1	0	0	4	1
AIK	2020	Allsvenskan	16	0	1	0	0	0	17	0
AIK	2021	Allsvenskan	16	0	1	0	0	0	17	0
AIK	Total		32	0	6	1	0	0	38	1
Vejle (loan)	2021–22	Superliga	14	0	2	0	—		16	0
Vejle	2022–23	1. Division	27	0	2	0	—		29	0
Vejle	2023–24	Superliga	9	0	1	0	—		10	0
Vejle	Total		50	0	5	0	0	0	55	0
Career total			238	11	23	1	13	1	272	13

== Honours ==
VfB Stuttgart

- 2. Bundesliga: 2016–17

Vejle

- Danish 1st Division: 2022–23

Ghana U-20

- FIFA U-20 World Cup third place: 2013
- African U-20 Championship runner-up: 2013

Individual

- Allsvenskan Midfielder of the Season: 2015
