= Maxime Chanot =

Luxembourgish footballer (born 1989)

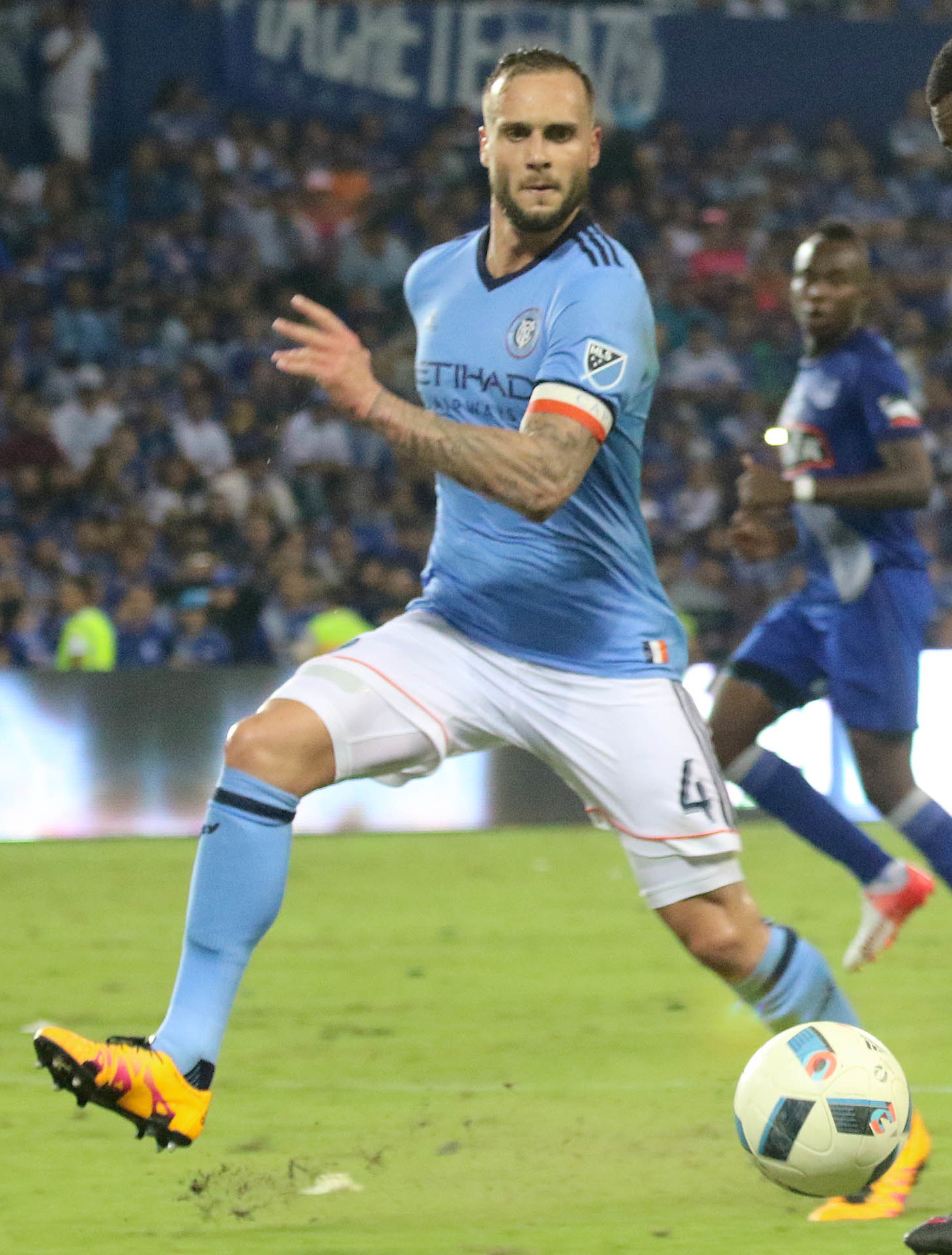
- Chanot playing for New York City FC in 2017

Personal information
- Full name: Maxime Paul Jackie Chanot
- Date of birth: 21 November 1989 (age 36)
- Place of birth: Nancy, France
- Height: 1.86 m (6 ft 1 in)
- Position: Defender

Youth career
- 1998–2000: GSA Tomblaine
- 2000–2005: Nancy
- 2005–2006: Reims

Senior career*
Years	Team	Apps	(Gls)
2007–2009	Sheffield United	0	(0)
2008	→ Mansfield Town (loan)	5	(0)
2009–2011	Le Mans	0	(0)
2010–2011	→ Gueugnon (loan)	16	(0)
2011–2012	WS Woluwe	44	(1)
2013	Beerschot	9	(0)
2013–2016	Kortrijk	82	(5)
2016–2023	New York City	167	(5)
2023–2024	Ajaccio	21	(0)
2024–2025	Los Angeles FC	24	(0)
Total		368	(11)

International career^{‡}
2013–2024	Luxembourg	72	(4)
- * Club domestic league appearances and goals as of 27 August 2025 ‡ National team caps and goals as of 9 September 2024

Maxime Paul Jackie Chanot (born 21 November 1989) is a former professional footballer who last played as a defender for Major League Soccer club Los Angeles FC. Born in France, he represented the Luxembourg national team.

== Club career ==
Having joined Sheffield United in 2006 from Stade de Reims Chanot became a regular in the academy and reserves sides. The aggressive, athletic central defender joined Mansfield Town on loan on 4 October 2008, and made his debut for Mansfield in the 1–0 defeat against Woking despite picking up man of the match award. He returned to Bramall Lane having played five games for The Stags. As the Blades looked to cut costs, having failed to gain promotion, Chanot was released at the end of the 2008–09 season.

In November 2009 he signed a two-year contract with French Ligue 1 side Le Mans FC. He then moved on a season-long loan to FC Gueugnon in 2010.

In September 2011, Chanot signed a one-year deal for Belgium team White Star Woluwe FC, which was successively extended for one more season. Sport/Foot Magazine named him among the twenty best second division football players of the league. His great performances drew the attention of a Division 1 Belgium team, Beerschot AC which signed him in 2013.

=== KV Kortrijk ===
Chanot continued to impress and was offered a contract by another Division 1 Belgium team, KV Kortrijk. Chanot was named several times best defender of the Belgium championship. Despite being chased by many clubs, especially Queen Park Rangers and Chievo Verona, he decided to join New York City FC coached by Patrick Vieira.

=== New York City ===
On 16 July 2016, it was announced that Chanot had signed with Major League Soccer club New York City FC. Chanot made his NYCFC debut as a halftime substitute for Jefferson Mena during a 5–1 victory against the Colorado Rapids on 30 July 2016. Chanot was given Team of the Week honors by MLS the following week for his performance during his first start for New York City against the San Jose Earthquakes. He finished the season having made 8 league appearances as well as starting both of NYCFC's playoff games.

On 3 June 2017, Chanot scored his first MLS goal in a 2–1 win over Philadelphia Union. A few weeks later, Chanot scored his second goal of the season against Whitecaps Vancouver after an assist from Andrea Pirlo. Chanot made 19 appearances in the 2017 MLS season before being sidelined on 20 July with a herniated disk in his back. Initial reports thought the injury would only keep him out two to four weeks but after further evaluation Chanot had to undergo surgery and he missed the rest of the season, including both of NYCFC's playoff matches.

Over the next two seasons, Chanot's defensive partnership with Alexander Callens was recognized as one of the best in MLS. At the end of the 2019 season, Chanot was named NYCFC best defender of the year. NYCFC also rewarded Chanot with the Most Minutes Played award.Chanot's performance did not go unnoticed and the Major League Soccer named him fourth best defender of the 2019 season. Chanot was a regular starter of the 2021 MLS Cup Winning NYCFC side.

=== Los Angeles FC ===
After a brief stint with Ajaccio, Chanot returned to Major League Soccer and signed with Los Angeles FC through the 2025 season. He announced his retirement from professional football on August 27, 2025.

== International career ==
A Luxembourg international, Chanot scored his first goal for his national team on 4 June 2014, netting an equaliser in a friendly game against four-time FIFA World Cup winners Italy played at Stadio Renato Curi, Perugia. The game ended in a 1–1 draw.

On 13 November 2016, he converted a penalty in a World Cup qualifier against the Netherlands, which ended up being a 3–1 loss for Luxembourg.

== Personal life ==
In March 2018, Chanot earned a U.S. green card which qualifies him as a domestic player for MLS roster purposes.

== Career statistics ==
=== Club ===
As of match played 12 December 2021

Appearances and goals by club, season, and competition
Club	Season	League			National cup		Continental		Other		Total	
Club	Season	Division	Apps	Goals	Apps	Goals	Apps	Goals	Apps	Goals	Apps	Goals
Le Mans	2009–10	Ligue 1	0	0	—		—		—		0	0
Le Mans	2010–11	Ligue 2	0	0	—		—		—		0	0
Le Mans	Total		0	0	0	0	0	0	0	0	0	0
Mansfield Town (loan)	2008–09	Conference Premier	5	0	—		—		—		5	0
Gueugnon (loan)	2010–11	National	16	0	2	0	—		—		18	0
WS Woluwe	2011–12	Belgian Second Division	27	1	—		—		—		27	1
WS Woluwe	2012–13	Belgian Second Division	17	0	2	0	—		—		19	0
WS Woluwe	Total		44	1	2	0	0	0	0	0	46	1
Beerschot	2012–13	Belgian Pro League	9	0	—		—		—		9	0
Kortrijk	2013–14	Belgian Pro League	16	1	1	0	—		—		17	1
Kortrijk	2014–15	Belgian Pro League	31	1	2	0	—		—		33	1
Kortrijk	2015–16	Belgian Pro League	35	3	2	1	—		—		37	4
Kortrijk	Total		82	5	5	1	0	0	0	0	87	6
New York City FC	2016	MLS	6	0	0	0	—		2 (Note: Appearance(s) in MLS Cup Playoffs)	0	8	0
New York City FC	2017	MLS	19	2	0	0	—		0	0	19	2
New York City FC	2018	MLS	18	1	1	0	—		3	1	22	2
New York City FC	2019	MLS	31	0	2	0	—		1	0	34	0
New York City FC	2020	MLS	20	0	—		4 (Note: Appearance(s) in CONCACAF Champions League)	0	3 (Note: 2 Appearance(s) in MLS is Back Tournament knockout stage, 1 Appearance(s) and 1 goal in MLS Cup Playoffs)	1	27	1
New York City FC	2021	MLS	30	0	—		0	0	4	0	34	0
New York City FC	Total		124	3	3	0	4	0	13	2	144	5
Career total			280	9	12	1	5	0	13	2	309	12

=== International ===
As of match played 9 September 2024

Appearances and goals by national team and year
National team	Year	Apps	Goals
Luxembourg	2013	2	0
Luxembourg	2014	6	1
Luxembourg	2015	10	0
Luxembourg	2016	5	1
Luxembourg	2017	2	0
Luxembourg	2018	6	1
Luxembourg	2019	8	0
Luxembourg	2020	0	0
Luxembourg	2021	9	0
Luxembourg	2022	9	0
Luxembourg	2023	11	1
Luxembourg	2024	4	0
Total		72	4

Scores and results list Luxembourg's goal tally first, score column indicates score after each Chanot goal.

List of international goals scored by Maxime Chanot
No	Date	Venue	Opponent	Score	Result	Competition
1.	4 June 2014	Stadio Marc'Antonio Bentegodi, Verona, Italy	Italy	1–1	1–1	Friendly
2.	13 November 2016	Stade Josy Barthel, Luxembourg City, Luxembourg	Netherlands	1–1	1–3	2018 FIFA World Cup qualification
3.	11 September 2018	San Marino Stadium, Serravalle, San Marino	San Marino	1–0	3–0	2018–19 UEFA Nations League D
4.	8 September 2023	Stade de Luxembourg, Luxembourg City, Luxembourg	Iceland	1–0	3–1	UEFA Euro 2024 qualifying

== Honours ==
New York City FC

- MLS Cup: 2021
- MLS Eastern Conference Championship: 2021
- Campeones Cup: 2022

Los Angeles FC

- U.S. Open Cup: 2024
