= James Sands =

American soccer player (born 2000)

- Sands with New York City FC in 2026

Personal information
- Full name: James Hoban Sands
- Date of birth: July 6, 2000 (age 26)
- Place of birth: Rye, New York, United States
- Height: 6 ft 1 in (1.86 m)
- Positions: Center-back; defensive midfielder

Team information
- Current team: New York City FC
- Number: 6

Youth career
- 2010–2015: New York Soccer Club
- 2015–2017: New York City FC

Senior career*
| Years | Team | Apps | (Gls) |
| 2017– | New York City FC | 120 | (1) |
| 2018 | → Louisville City (loan) | 3 | (0) |
| 2022–2023 | → Rangers (loan) | 24 | (0) |
| 2025–2026 | → FC St. Pauli (loan) | 31 | (1) |

International career^{‡}
| 2016–2017 | United States U17 | 42 | (1) |
| 2021– | United States | 14 | (0) |
Medal record
Representing United States
| Winner | CONCACAF Gold Cup | 2021 |
- * Club domestic league appearances and goals as of 17:30, March 8, 2026 (UTC) ‡ National team caps and goals as of October 14, 2025

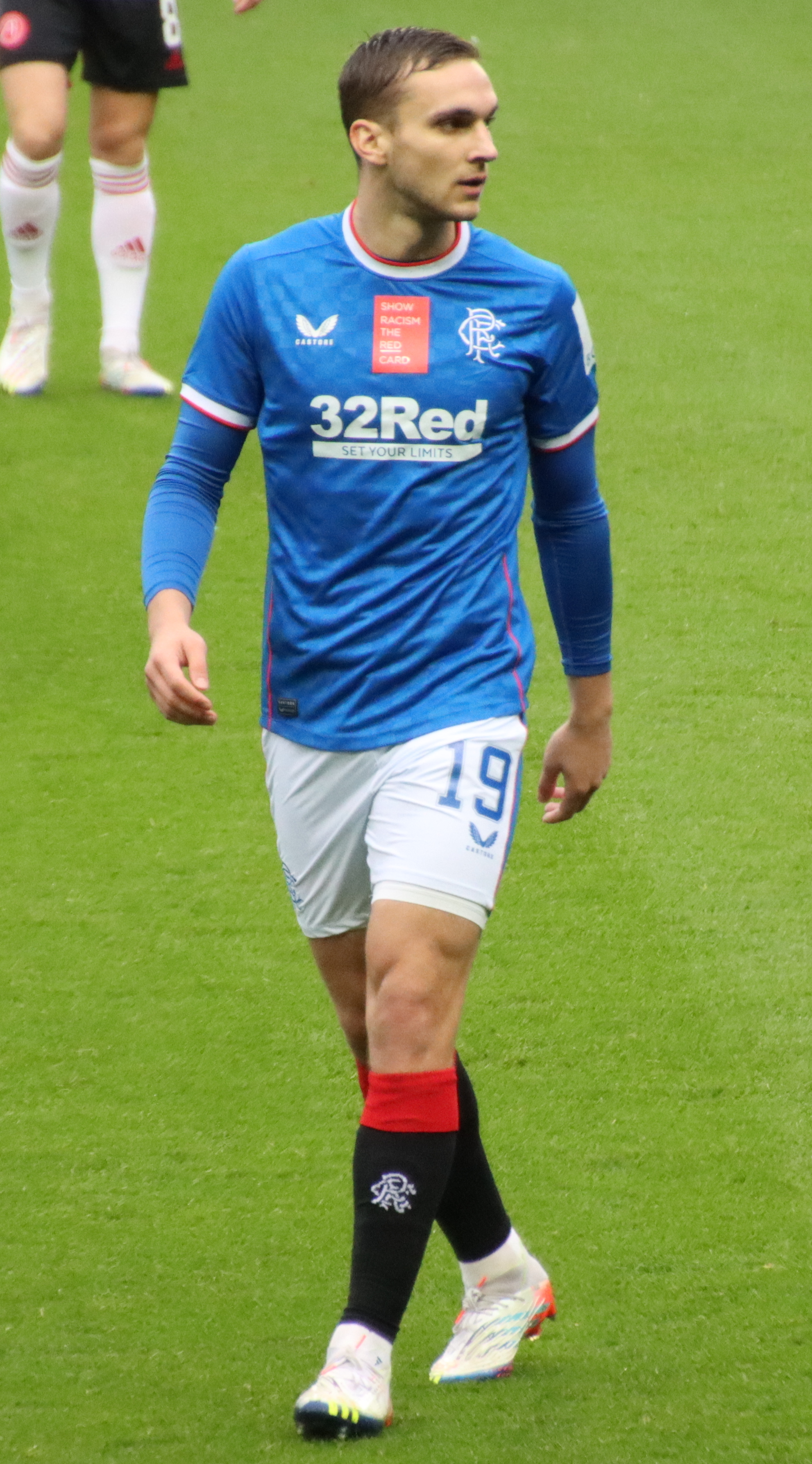
Sands with Rangers in 2022

James Hoban Sands (born July 6, 2000) is an American professional soccer player who plays as a center-back or defensive midfielder for Major League Soccer side New York City FC and United States national team. He became NYCFC's first homegrown player in July 2017.

== Youth career ==
Sands joined New York Soccer Club, an affiliate of New York City FC, at age 10. In 2015, he joined New York City after the inception of the Under-16 academy side, alongside his twin brother Will Sands.

== Club career ==
=== New York City ===
In January 2017, Sands became the first Academy player to be included in the New York City FC roster for pre-season. On June 27, 2017, he signed his first professional contract to begin on July 1. The deal made him the club's first ever homegrown player. Sands made his professional debut on September 16, 2017, coming on as a substitute for Andrea Pirlo in a 1–1 draw against Colorado Rapids.

In 2019, Sands became a regular starter for NYCFC, first as a defensive midfielder, and then as the central defender in a three-man back line once New York City FC switched formations.

In 2021, he started in MLS Cup 2021, in which New York City FC defeated the Portland Timbers in a penalty shootout to win their first ever MLS Cup.

==== Louisville City (loan) ====
In 2018, Sands joined Louisville City in the second-division USL on a short-term loan from August 15 through September 1. Sands worked in Louisville under John Hackworth, who had previously coached Sands with the United States U17 team.

==== Rangers (loan) ====
On January 5, 2022, Sands joined Scottish Premiership side Rangers on an initial 18-month loan deal with an option to buy. On January 18, he made his Rangers debut during a 1–1 draw with Aberdeen. He made a substitute appearance in the 2022 UEFA Europa League final in which Rangers lost to Eintracht Frankfurt in a penalty shootout. On March 1, 2023, his loan was terminated and he returned to New York City FC.

==== FC St. Pauli (loan) ====
On January 1, 2025, Sands signed for Bundesliga club FC St. Pauli on loan until the end of the 2024–25 season. In May 2025, St. Pauli announced that Sands' loan was extended to the 2025–26 season.

== International career ==
Sands regularly featured for the United States under-17s in 2017 and helped his nation finish second in the CONCACAF Under-17 Championship in May. The United States eventually lost to Mexico in a penalty shootout, although Sands scored and was named to the "Team of the Tournament."

In July 2021, Sands was called up to the senior team for the 2021 CONCACAF Gold Cup and made his debut against Haiti as a substitute. He started in the final game of the tournament, in which the United States defeated Mexico 1–0.

In June 2023, interim coach BJ Callaghan called Sands to the 2023 Gold Cup roster. As of June 30, 2023, he started in both the games versus Jamaica and St. Kitts and Nevis.

== Career statistics ==
=== Club ===
As of match played March 8, 2026

Appearances and goals by club, season, and competition
| Club | Season | League | | | National cup (Note: Includes U.S. Open Cup, Scottish Cup and DFB-Pokal) | | League cup (Note: Includes MLS Cup playoffs and Scottish League Cup) | | Continental | | Other | | Total | |
| Club | Season | Division | Apps | Goals | Apps | Goals | Apps | Goals | Apps | Goals | Apps | Goals | Apps | Goals |
|---|---|---|---|---|---|---|---|---|---|---|---|---|---|---|
| New York City FC | 2017 | MLS | 1 | 0 | — | | — | | — | | — | | 1 | 0 |
| New York City FC | 2018 | MLS | 3 | 0 | 1 | 0 | — | | — | | — | | 4 | 0 |
| New York City FC | 2019 | MLS | 19 | 0 | — | | — | | — | | — | | 19 | 0 |
| New York City FC | 2020 | MLS | 16 | 0 | — | | — | | 3 (Note: Appearances in CONCACAF Champions League) | 0 | 2 (Note: Two appearances in MLS is Back Tournament knockout stage) | 0 | 21 | 0 |
| New York City FC | 2021 | MLS | 26 | 0 | — | | 4 | 0 | — | | — | | 30 | 0 |
| New York City FC | 2023 | MLS | 26 | 0 | 1 | 0 | — | | — | | 2 (Note: Appearance(s) in Leagues Cup) | 0 | 29 | 0 |
| New York City FC | 2024 | MLS | 29 | 1 | — | | 4 | 0 | — | | 5 | 0 | 38 | 1 |
| New York City FC | Total | | 120 | 1 | 2 | 0 | 8 | 0 | 3 | 0 | 9 | 0 | 142 | 1 |
| Louisville City (loan) | 2018 | USL | 3 | 0 | — | | — | | — | | — | | 3 | 0 |
| Rangers (loan) | 2021–22 | Scottish Premiership | 7 | 0 | 2 | 0 | — | | 5 (Note: Appearances in UEFA Europa League) | 0 | — | | 14 | 0 |
| Rangers (loan) | 2022–23 | Scottish Premiership | 17 | 0 | 1 | 1 | 1 | 0 | 8 (Note: Appearances in UEFA Champions League) | 0 | — | | 27 | 1 |
| Rangers (loan) | Total | | 24 | 0 | 3 | 1 | 1 | 0 | 13 | 0 | — | | 41 | 1 |
| FC St. Pauli (loan) | 2024–25 | Bundesliga | 7 | 0 | — | | — | | — | | — | | 7 | 0 |
| FC St. Pauli (loan) | 2025–26 | Bundesliga | 24 | 1 | 4 | 0 | — | | — | | — | | 28 | 1 |
| FC St. Pauli (loan) | Total | | 31 | 1 | 4 | 0 | — | | — | | — | | 35 | 1 |
| Career total | | | 178 | 2 | 9 | 1 | 9 | 0 | 16 | 0 | 9 | 0 | 221 | 3 |

=== International ===
As of match played October 14, 2025

Appearances and goals by national team and year
| National team | Year | Apps | Goals |
|---|---|---|---|
| United States | 2021 | 7 | 0 |
| United States | 2022 | 0 | 0 |
| United States | 2023 | 6 | 0 |
| United States | 2024 | 0 | 0 |
| United States | 2025 | 1 | 0 |
| Total | | 14 | 0 |

== Honors ==
Louisville City FC

- USL Cup: 2018

New York City FC

- MLS Cup: 2021

Rangers

- Scottish Cup: 2021–22
- UEFA Europa League runner-up: 2021–22

United States

- CONCACAF Gold Cup: 2021

Individual

- CONCACAF Under-17 Championship Team of the Tournament: 2017
- MLS All-Star: 2021
