= Daniel Bedoya =

Colombian footballer (born 1994)

Dan Bedoya
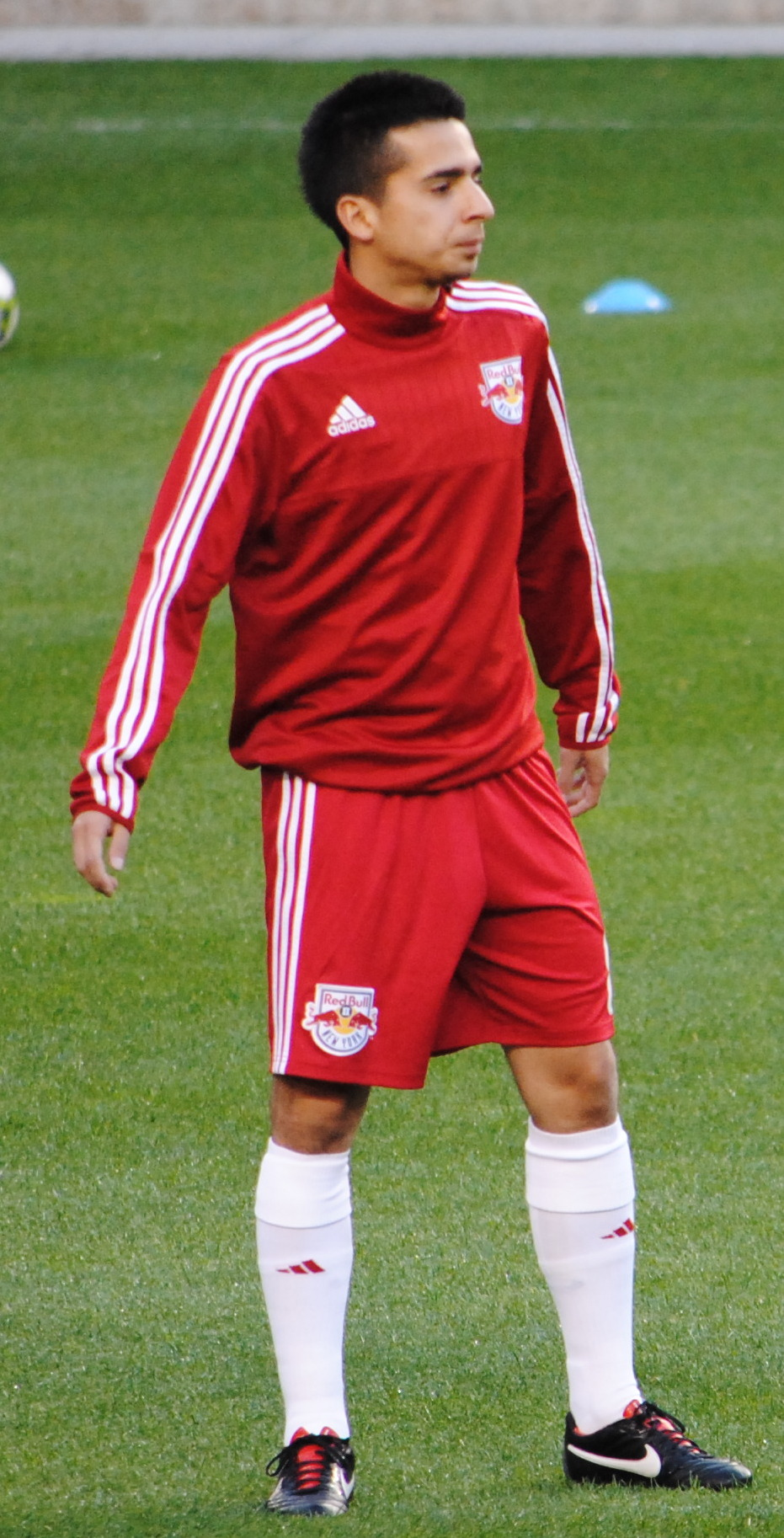

Personal information
- Full name: Daniel Bedoya Vélez
- Date of birth: 13 February 1994 (age 32)
- Place of birth: Medellin, Colombia
- Height: 1.65 m (5 ft 5 in)
- Position: Midfielder

Team information
- Current team: ASC San Diego
- Number: 10

Youth career
- 2011–2012: New York Red Bulls

College career
Years	Team	Apps	(Gls)
2012–2013	St. John's Red Storm	36	(3)

Senior career*
Years	Team	Apps	(Gls)
2014	New York Red Bulls U-23	14	(6)
2015	New York Red Bulls II	25	(3)
2017–2018	Long Island Rough Riders	21	(4)
2018–2019	New York City FC	1	(0)
2019	→ Hartford Athletic (loan)	9	(2)
2020	Atlético Pantoja	5	(0)
2020	New Amsterdam	7	(0)
2021–2022	FC Tucson	53	(6)
2023	ASC San Diego	19	(3)
- * Club domestic league appearances and goals as of September 21, 2023

Daniel Bedoya Velez (born 13 February 1994) is a Colombian professional footballer who plays for ASC San Diego.

== Early life ==
Bedoya was born in Medellin, Colombia, his family moved to Queens, New York in 2002.

== Career ==
=== Youth and college ===
Bedoya played varsity soccer for Francis Lewis High School in Queens, New York. He then played for the New York Red Bulls Academy since 2011 and was a member of the U-18 squad. Bedoya also played college soccer for St. John's University from 2012 to 2013. While with the Red Storm he played in 36 matches scoring 3 goals and recording 5 assists.

During the 2014 season Bedoya played for the New York Red Bulls U-23 in the National Premier Soccer League. He helped the team capture the 2014 NPSL title appearing as a starter in the league final. He also played with the U23s in the U.S. Open Cup.

=== Professional ===
Bedoya signed with New York Red Bulls II on April 3, 2015. On April 12, 2015, he made his debut with the club, coming on as first-half substitute in a match against Wilmington Hammerheads FC. On July 18, 2015, Bedoya scored his first professional goal in a 2–0 victory over Harrisburg City Islanders. On July 25, 2015, Bedoya scored his second goal of the season for New York in a 4–2 victory over Richmond Kickers. On September 5, 2015, Bedoya scored on a 22-yard free kick, helping New York to a 3–2 victory over Louisville City FC. On September 26, 2015, Bedoya scored one goal and assisted on another during extra time to help New York Red Bulls II to a 4–2 victory over Pittsburgh Riverhounds, advancing New York in the 2015 USL Playoffs.

In 2017 Bedoya joined Long Island Rough Riders in the Premier Development League. While with the club he appeared in 21 league matches and scored 4 goals. After impressing in a scrimmage against New York City FC, Bedoya was signed by the Major League Soccer side on August 9, 2018.

On 18 July 2019, Bedoya was loaned to USL Championship side Hartford Athletic for the remainder of the season.

Bedoya was released by New York City at the end of the 2019 season. On January 1 Bedoya was transferred by NYCFC to Dominican Republic team Atlético Pantoja of the Liga Dominicana de Fútbol. On March 7, Bedoya and the team won the leagues Super cup.

Bedoya moved to National Independent Soccer Association club New Amsterdam FC on August 20. He appeared in all four of the team's regular season matches during the Fall 2020 season, and played in all three playoff matches during the Fall Championship tournament.

On March 2, 2021, Bedoya returned to the USL when he was signed by FC Tucson of USL League One.

For the 2023 season, Bedoya joined National Independent Soccer Association club ASC San Diego.
