= Jeff Caldwell =

American soccer player (born 1996)

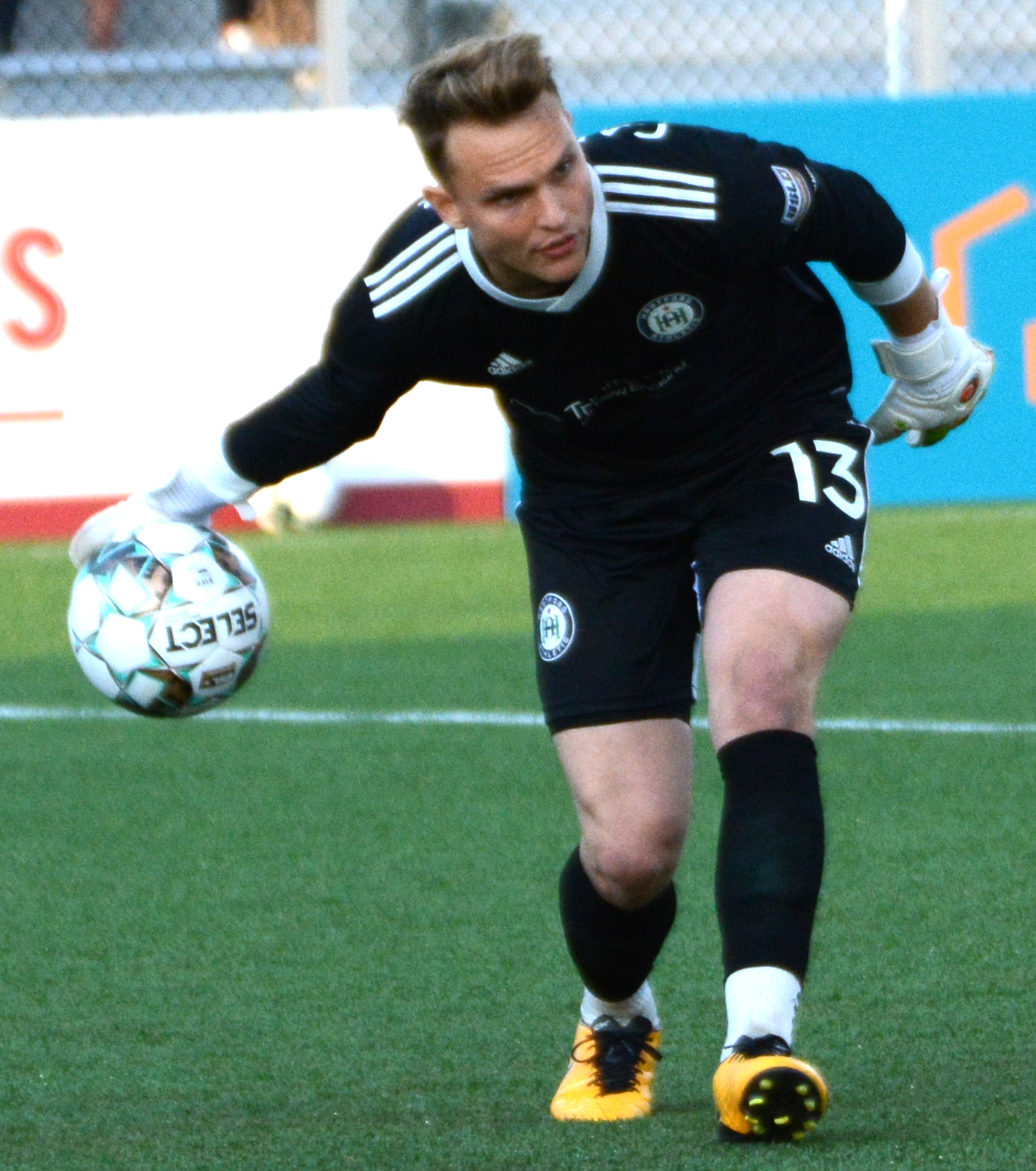
- Caldwell with Hartford Athletic in 2021

Personal information
- Full name: Jefferson Caldwell
- Date of birth: February 20, 1996 (age 30)
- Place of birth: Todd, North Carolina, United States
- Height: 6 ft 3 in (1.91 m)
- Position: Goalkeeper

Youth career
- –2014: North Carolina Fusion

College career
Years	Team	Apps	(Gls)
2014–2017	Virginia Cavaliers	61	(0)

Senior career*
Years	Team	Apps	(Gls)
2014–2016	Seattle Sounders FC U-23	20	(0)
2017	Colorado Rapids U-23	2	(0)
2018–2019	New York City FC	0	(0)
2019	→ Memphis 901 (loan)	28	(0)
2020	New England Revolution	0	(0)
2021	Hartford Athletic	30	(0)
2021	→ Miami FC (loan)	0	(0)
2022	Colorado Springs Switchbacks	27	(0)

International career^{‡}
2012–2013	United States U17	7	(0)
2013	United States U18	1	(0)
2015	United States U20	1	(0)
- * Club domestic league appearances and goals as of July 1, 2024 ‡ National team caps and goals as of March 9, 2019

Jefferson "Jeff" Caldwell (born February 20, 1996) is an American former professional soccer player who played as a goalkeeper.

== College and amateur ==
Caldwell played four years of college soccer at the University of Virginia between 2014 and 2017, making 61 appearances.

While at college, Caldwell appeared for USL PDL sides Seattle Sounders FC U-23 and Colorado Rapids U-23.

== Professional career ==
=== New York City FC ===
On January 19, 2018, Caldwell was selected 19th overall in the 2018 MLS SuperDraft by New York City FC. He signed with the club on February 28, 2018.

==== Loan to Memphis 901 ====
On March 5, 2019, Caldwell was loaned to USL Championship side Memphis 901 FC for their 2019 season.

=== New England Revolution ===
Caldwell was released by New York City on November 20, 2019. He was selected by New England Revolution in the MLS Waiver Draft on November 25, 2019. He was the third-choice keeper behind Matt Turner and Brad Knighton, and did not make an appearance in the 2020 season with the Revolution.

=== Hartford Athletic ===
On January 27, 2021, Caldwell signed with USL Championship team Hartford Athletic for the 2021 season.

He made his competitive debut with the team on April 30, 2021, against New York Red Bulls II. Caldwell finished the year second in saves for the USL Championship and tied for 3rd in clean sheets at nine.

==== Loan to Miami FC ====
On November 5, 2021, Caldwell was sent to USL Championship side Miami FC as an emergency loan ahead of the 2021 USL Championship Playoffs. He started for Miami in the team's 1–0 loss to Louisville City FC in the Eastern Conference Quarterfinals.

=== Colorado Springs Switchbacks ===
On December 7, 2021, it was announced Caldwell would join USL Championship side Colorado Springs Switchbacks ahead of their 2022 season.

== International ==
Caldwell played in one game with the United States Under-20 Men's National Team in 2015, and also featured for the U-17 and U-18 national teams. He was a member of the United States’ 2013 Concacaf U-17 Championship squad, and was also named to roster for the 2015 FIFA U-20 World Cup, but did not see game action.
