= List of Austin FC seasons =

Since its inaugural 2021 season, the American soccer club Austin FC has competed in Major League Soccer.

== Key ==
Key to competitions

- Major League Soccer (MLS) – The top-flight of soccer in the United States, established in 1996.
- U.S. Open Cup (USOC) – The premier knockout cup competition in U.S. soccer, first contested in 1914.
- CONCACAF Champions League (CCL) – The premier competition in North American soccer since 1962. It went by the name of Champions' Cup until 2008.
- Leagues Cup (LC) - NAFU sponsored competition beginning in 2019. New format in 2023 to include all MLS and Liga MX teams.

Key to colors and symbols

1st or W	Winners
2nd or RU	Runners-up
3rd	Third place
Last	Wooden Spoon
♦	MLS Golden Boot
	Highest average attendance
Italics	Ongoing competition

Key to league record

- Season = The year and article of the season
- Div = Division/level on pyramid
- League = League name
- Pld = Games played
- W = Games won
- L = Games lost
- D = Games drawn
- GF = Goals for
- GA = Goals against
- GD = Goal difference
- Pts = Points
- PPG = Points per game
- Conf. = Conference position
- Overall = League position

Key to cup record

- DNE = Did not enter
- DNQ = Did not qualify
- NH = Competition not held or canceled
- QR = Qualifying round
- PR = Preliminary round
- GS = Group stage
- R1 = First round
- R2 = Second round
- R3 = Third round
- R32 = Round of 32
- R16 = Round of 16
- QF = Quarterfinals
- SF = Semifinals
- RU = Runners-up
- W = Winners

== Seasons ==
As of November 7, 2026

Season	League									Position		Playoffs	USOC	Continental		Average attendance (Note: Avg. attendance only includes statistics from regular season matches.)	Top goalscorer(s) (Note: Top goalscorer(s) includes all goals scored in the regular season, MLS Cup Playoffs, U.S. Open Cup, Leagues Cup, CONCACAF Champions League, FIFA Club World Cup, and other competitive matches.)	
Season	Pld	W	L	D	GF	GA	GD	Pts	PPG	Conf.	Overall	Playoffs	USOC	CCL	LC	Average attendance	Name(s)	Goals
2021	34	9	21	4	35	56	–21	31	0.91	12th	24th	DNQ	NH	–	–	20,738	(Paraguay) Cecilio Dominguez (Uruguay) Diego Fagundez	7
2022	34	16	10	8	65	49	+16	56	1.65	2nd	4th	SF	R3	DNQ	NH	20,738	(Argentina) Sebastián Driussi	25
2023	34	10	15	9	49	55	–6	39	1.15	12th	25th	DNQ	R16	R16	GS	20,738	(Argentina) Sebastián Driussi	13
2024	34	11	14	9	39	48	–9	42	1.24	10th	18th	DNQ	DNP (Note: Changes made by U.S. Soccer for the 2024 U.S. Open Cup allowed MLS Next Pro teams to play. Austin FC II entered the first round of the 2024 U.S. Open Cup.)	DNQ	R32	20,738	(Colombia) Jáder Obrian (Argentina) Sebastián Driussi	8
2025	34	13	13	8	37	45	–8	47	1.28	6th	15th	R1	RU	DNQ	DNQ (Note: CONCACAF changed format for the 2025 Leagues Cup to feature only 18 MLS clubs. Based on these changes Austin FC did not qualify for the 2025 Leagues Cup.)	20,738	(United States) Brandon Vázquez (Albania) Myrto Uzuni	9
2026	34	8	16	10	42	65	–23	34	1.00	14th	26th	DNQ	R32	DNQ	QF	20,738	(Albania) Myrto Uzuni	13
Total	204	67	89	48	267	317	–52	249	1.22	–	–	–	–	–	–	–	(Argentina) Sebastián Driussi	51
