= Žan Kolmanič =

Slovenian footballer (born 2000)

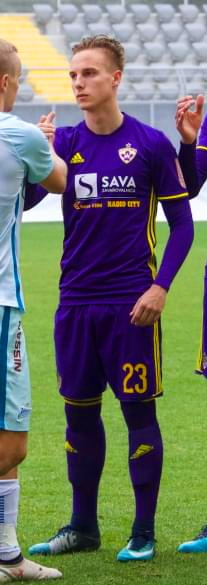
- Kolmanič with Maribor in 2018

Personal information
- Date of birth: 3 March 2000 (age 26)
- Place of birth: Murska Sobota, Slovenia
- Height: 1.77 m (5 ft 10 in)
- Position: Left-back

Team information
- Current team: Austin
- Number: 23

Youth career
- 2005–2011: Veržej
- 2011–2013: Mura 05
- 2013–2014: Veržej
- 2014–2019: Maribor

Senior career*
Years	Team	Apps	(Gls)
2017–2021	Maribor	44	(0)
2021	→ Austin (loan)	30	(0)
2022–	Austin	85	(1)

International career
2015	Slovenia U16	6	(0)
2016–2017	Slovenia U17	12	(0)
2017–2018	Slovenia U18	5	(0)
2017–2019	Slovenia U19	15	(0)
2020–2021	Slovenia U21	4	(0)
- * Club domestic league appearances and goals as of 20:16, 1 November 2026 (UTC)

Žan Kolmanič (born 3 March 2000) is a Slovenian professional footballer who plays as a left-back for Major League Soccer club Austin.

== Career ==
In March 2021, Kolmanič joined Major League Soccer expansion club Austin on a season-long loan from Maribor ahead of the 2021 season. He made 30 league appearances during his first season, and the club exercised their loan option in November 2021, acquiring Kolmanič on a permanent deal through 2024.

== Career statistics ==
As of match played 31 October 2026

Appearances and goals by club, season and competition
Club	Season	League			National cup (Note: Includes Slovenian Football Cup, U.S. Open Cup)		Continental		Other		Total	
Club	Season	Division	Apps	Goals	Apps	Goals	Apps	Goals	Apps	Goals	Apps	Goals
Maribor	2017–18	Slovenian PrvaLiga	4	0	1	0	0	0	—		5	0
Maribor	2018–19	Slovenian PrvaLiga	14	0	1	0	0	0	—		15	0
Maribor	2019–20	Slovenian PrvaLiga	6	0	0	0	0	0	—		6	0
Maribor	2020–21	Slovenian PrvaLiga	20	0	1	0	0	0	—		21	0
Maribor	Total		44	0	3	0	0	0	0	0	47	0
Austin FC (loan)	2021	Major League Soccer	30	0	—		—		—		30	0
Austin FC	2022	Major League Soccer	21	0	1	0	—		1 (Note: Appearance in MLS Cup Playoffs)	0	23	0
Austin FC	2023	Major League Soccer	6	0	0	0	1 (Note: Appearance in CONCACAF Champions League)	0	0	0	7	0
Austin FC	2024	Major League Soccer	15	0	—		—		1 (Note: Appearance in Leagues Cup)	0	16	0
Austin FC	2025	Major League Soccer	25	1	4	0	—		2	0	31	1
Austin FC	2026	Major League Soccer	19	0	1	0	—		1	0	21	0
Austin FC	Total		116	1	6	0	1	0	5	0	128	1
Career total			160	1	9	0	1	0	5	0	175	1

== Honours ==
Maribor

- Slovenian PrvaLiga: 2018–19
- Slovenian Cup runner-up: 2018–19
