= 2022 Austin FC season =

Austin FC
2022 season
- Chairman: Anthony Precourt
- Head coach: Josh Wolff
- Stadium: Q2 Stadium
- MLS: 2nd Western Conference, 4th MLS
- MLS Cup playoffs: Western Conference final
- U.S. Open Cup: Third round
- Top goalscorer: League: Sebastián Driussi (25); All: Sebastián Driussi (25)
- Average home league attendance: 20,738
- Biggest win: ATX 5–0 CIN (2/26)
- Biggest defeat: LA 4–1 ATX (5/19)
Home colors	Away colors

The 2022 Austin FC season was the club's second season in Major League Soccer, the top flight of soccer in the United States. Austin FC played in the Western Conference of Major League Soccer.

Due to the 2022 FIFA World Cup, play began February 26, 2022, about a month earlier than normal, and concluded October 9, 2022. Outside of MLS, Austin FC competed in the USSF's Lamar Hunt U.S. Open Cup for the first time in its history.

== Background ==
Austin FC started their first season by building their roster with their first ever signing, Rodney Redes, on July 6, 2020. The club continued to build their squad by signing their first Designated Player, Cecilio Dominguez, on August 24, 2020. Austin FC continued to build on Dec 13, 2020 by trading for five more players using General Allocation Money. On Dec 15, 2020, the club obtained five more players through the 2021 MLS Expansion Draft. By the end of the year, Austin FC added five more players to the roster. Austin FC started 2021 by adding seven more players to the team, including its second Designated Player, Tomás Pochettino. On April 16, 2021, the day before the club's first competitive game they added two more players to round out the roster. On 30 June 2021, the club signed Moussa Djitté through the MLS U22 Initiative. Sebastián Driussi was signed on 29 July 2021 and the club's third and final Designated Player. Austin FC completed its club roster on September 9, 2021, when they signed their first Homegrown Player, Owen Wolff, son of coach Josh Wolff.

2021 was the inaugural season for Austin FC, playing as an expansion club in Major League Soccer. The season started with an extended streak of away games while Q2 Stadium was being completed. Austin FC played its first eight games away from home, winning only two of those games. On June 19, 2021 Austin FC played its first game at Q2 Stadium, a draw against San Jose Earthquakes. Austin FC would go on to win seven home game during the season, finishing in 12th Place in the Western Conference and 24th place overall, with a record of 9 wins, 4 draws, and 21 loses.

== Season ==
=== Pre-season ===
Immediately following the 2021 Austin FC season, Austin FC started their preparation for the 2022 MLS Season. After the retirement of Matt Besler on November 10, 2021, Austin FC started firming up their starting roster by completing the purchase of Žan Kolmanič from NK Maribor on November 19, 2021. Following this signing they declined options on six players: Aedan Stanley, Aaron Schoenfeld, Brady Scott, Ben Sweat, Jared Stroud, Kekuta Manneh on November 30, 2021. Just over two weeks after declining his option, Austin FC re-signed Jared Stroud to a one-year deal.

Austin FC took their first hit of the season during the 2021 MLS Expansion Draft when Charlotte FC chose McKinze Gaines in the first round for $50,000 GAM. This also exempted Austin FC from the 2022 MLS Expansion Draft.

On December 20, 2021, Austin FC strengthened their midfield be signing veteran free agent Ethan Finlay.

Upon signing with Austin FC on December 28, 2021, Maxi Urruti joined his sixth MLS team, including all three Texas based teams.

On January 10, 2022, Austin FC loaned Tomás Pochettino to Argentine club River Plate on a one-year loan.

The MLS SuperDraft was held on January 11, 2022, and Austin FC selected Kipp Keller (GA) from Saint Louis University, Charlie Asensio from Clemson Tigers, and Michael Knapp from New York Red Bulls II.

On January 12, 2022, Austin FC signed midfielder Jhojan Valencia from Colombian Champions Deportivo Cali to a three-year contract with an option for a fourth year.

Looking to continue strengthening the back four, Austin FC signed Norwegian defender Ruben Gabrielsen from French side Toulouse FC to a two-year contract with an option for a third year.

Continuing to make adjustments to the lineup, Austin FC executed an offseason buyout of the last year of Ulises Segura's contract on January 25, 2022. That same day they also signed Damian Las, a U.S. Youth International, from Fulham FC.

On February 7, 2021, Austin FC signed MLS Veteran Felipe Martins to the team as a free agent on a one-year contract with and option for a second year. Martins is a box-to-box midfielder who ranks among the best in the MLS during his 10 years in the league.

After Claudio Reyna announced that the team was looking at bringing on one more defender, possibly on loan, Austin FC signs Charlie Asensio to a one-year deal with an option for three additional years. Asensio was the 35th overall draft pick from Clemson.

=== Start of the Season - February / March ===
Austin FC opened their season with consecutive home matches against Eastern Conference foes FC Cincinnati and Inter Miami CF and won 5-0 and 5-1 respectively, becoming the first MLS team in history to score 10 goals in their first 2 matches. Austin then lost their first road game in Portland 1-0 then had a 1–1 draw against the Sounders going into the first international break.

=== Rounding Into Form - April / May ===
After starting the month with a disappointing 2–2 draw against the San Jose Earthquakes, Austin won their next 4 league matches. First, a 1–0 win against Minnesota United FC, and then a thrilling and historic 3–2 comeback win in Washington D.C. against D.C. United, with all 3 of their goals coming after the 80th minute, the 5th such occurrence in MLS history when a team won after trailing by 2+ goals after 80 minutes. Danny Hoesen scored his first goal for the club after recovering from a lengthy injury, and Ruben Gabrielsen followed with the game winner. They dismantled the Vancouver Whitecaps FC in a 3–0 home victory, and won 2–1 in Houston after losing goalkeeper Brad Stuver to injury. Sebastian Driussi was the first Austin FC player to be named the MLS Player of the Month and built an early case as an MVP favorite, with 4 goals and 1 assist in 5 matches.

After a blistering 4–1–0 April, Austin FC fell back to Earth in May, with a 1–1–3 record, including their first home loss of the season against the LA Galaxy on May 8. On May 13, the club announced that Josh Wolff had signed a three-year contract extension through the 2025 MLS season. On May 18, Wolff's son Owen became the first homegrown player and youngest player to start a match for the club in a 2–1 win against LAFC. Austin went into the June international break with 7 wins, 3 draws, and 4 losses.

==== U.S. Open Cup ====
On April 20, Austin FC also played their first ever Cup competition in the 2022 U.S. Open Cup Round of 32. Diego Fagundez scored the club's lone goal in a 2–1 loss against San Antonio FC in extra time.

=== Road Warriors and Copa Tejas - June / July ===
Austin FC came out of the international break with 7 matches over 29 days. They quickly got back to their winning ways with their first ever victory on foreign soil, a 1–0 victory over CF Montreal in Canada with only 10 men. They followed it up with a comeback 2–2 draw against FC Dallas then won their next four competitions - their first three on the road and their fourth a comeback home win against the Houston Dynamo to take the Copa Tejas lead. In their road win in Colorado, Driussi became the first player in club history to score 10 goals in a season and Austin FC exceeded their win and points total, and matched their goal total from 2021.

In their seventh match from the international break, Austin won their first trophy in franchise history when they played a 1–1 draw against FC Dallas in Toyota Stadium to win the Copa Tejas on July 16. Fagundez scored the cup-winning goal in the 79th minute. Despite a Driussi brace a week later, Austin lost 4–3 at home to the New York Red Bulls and then closed out the month six days later with a 2–0 road win in Kansas City.

Austin FC made its first moves of the mid-year trade cycle by signing Washington Corozo (FW) on a 6-month loan, with option to buy, from the Ecuadorian team Sporting Cristal on July 6, and Emiliano Rigoni (FW) on July 29 from São Paulo FC. Rigoni and Driussi, both Argentines, were reunited after winning 5 trophies together with Zenit.

On July 12, Sebastian Driussi was named Austin's first MLS All-Star. He was named the MLS Player of the Month in July for the second time of the season with 5 goals and 3 assists in 6 games, bolstering his MVP candidacy.

On July 23, Cecilio Domínguez and Austin FC came to a mutual agreement for the termination of his contract, opening up a Designated Player spot on the roster, which went to Rigoni. He last played on March 20 and was suspended in April due to an MLS investigation related to an alleged instance of domestic violence. Despite being reinstated following MLS Protocols, the CBA and being required to attend League-mandated counseling, Dominguez did not make another appearance with the team.

=== End of the Regular Season - August / September / October ===
On August 4, Austin FC announced it would expand the reach of their organization by becoming part of the Division 3 MLS Next Pro in 2023. According to Austin FC Sporting Director, Claudio Reyna, "The team will provide valuable competitive opportunities, and will play a key role in bridging the gap between the Austin FC Academy and First Team.". The team, colors, and crest were announced on December 13.

After winning in Kansas City, four of Austin's five competitions in August were at home, with the key match against LAFC on August 26 that would likely decide the top spot in the West, and possibly the Supporters' Shield. They had to settle for a 3–3 draw in their first match against the Earthquakes where they lost ground to LAFC, but Driussi scored another brace. They won their next match against Sporting KC 4–3 after trailing 3–1 in the second half. Driussi scored Austin's first ever stoppage time winner, and Jon Gallagher, Julio Cascante and Danny Hoesen also scored goals. After losing 2–1 in Minnesota, Austin FC was 9 points behind LAFC going into their match against them, which they won 4–1 in coruscating fashion in front of a national audience. Maxi Urruti notched a brace with 2 goals over 3 minutes, and Diego Fagundez scored off a free kick. They ended August with a 2–1 home loss to Portland, but Driussi made a goal contribution in his 11th consecutive match scoring his 20th goal of the season, the first Austin FC player to do so. Going into September, Austin was 6 points behind LAFC and the Philadelphia Union for the Supporters Shield.

Austin had an opportunity to clinch their first playoff berth in team history on the road, but lost back-to-back 3–0 shutouts, all but ensuring they would not claim the Supporters' Shield. In the first match against Nashville SC, striker Hany Mukhtar made an MVP case of his own with a second half brace for Nashville and took over the Golden Boot lead from Driussi with his 20th and 21st goals of the season. Returning home on September 14 against RSL, Moussa Djitte scored the club's first ever hat trick and Austin FC clinched their first ever MLS playoff berth in a 3–0 victory. They played Nashville three days later where Driussi and Mukhtar traded goals in a 1–1 draw. On October 1, they locked up the #2 seed in the West when FC Dallas lost to Colorado on October 1, ensuring their first two playoff games would be played at Q2. Their regular season ended with a loss and a draw in two October matches, and their final record was 16 wins, 8 draws, and 10 losses.

=== Postseason ===
==== Western Conference Quarterfinals vs. Real Salt Lake ====
Austin FC's first ever playoff game was at Q2 Stadium against Real Salt Lake, who snuck into the playoffs after beating Portland 3–1 on Decision Day. The home crowd saw the club's first ever game that was decided by a penalty shootout. Austin found themselves down early when Sergio Córdova scored for RSL in the 3rd minute. He scored again on a penalty in the 15th minute after VAR ruled Jhojan Valencia played a handball in the box. Austin battled back when Sebastian Driussi scored a header the 31st minute from a Diego Fagundez cross. RSL was suddenly down a man when Rubio Rubin was sent off in the 53rd minute for failing to make a tackle on Austin GK Brad Stuver. RSL held firm defensively for the second half but Scott Caldwell played a handball, and Driussi scored a brace in the 4th minute of stoppage time to tie the game 2–2.

Austin dominated possession in the first half of extra time. Driussi had a goal in the 97th minute waved off when the referee ruled the ball ricocheted off his forearm on the volley. Žan Kolmanič took a shot from 30 yards out, but RSL GK Zac MacMath made the save in the 102nd minute. Emiliano Rigoni sent a header from Fagundez just wide of the post before the end the half.

Fagundez sent a corner in the 109th minute that Driussi headed off the post. In the 111th minute, RSL was on the counterattack but Stuver made a breakaway save on Andrew Brody. Driussi thought he had the game-winner in the 114th minute, but Moussa Djitte was offside. He had another header in the 120th minute that MacMath easily saved, and Felipe was later ruled offside on a Daniel Pereira cross. Austin tried to get one last chance before penalty kicks, but RSL ran out the clock as fatigue set in for both teams.

Austin won their first ever playoff game 3–1 on penalties with goals from Driussi, Fagundez, and Rigoni. Stuver made back-to-back saves then Tate Schmitt sent RSL's last chance over the bar in the 4th round.

Austin came back from two goals down for the 6th time of the season. They became the 3rd team in MLS history to win a playoff game after being down two goals.

==== Western Conference Semifinals vs. FC Dallas ====
FC Dallas advanced to play Austin FC after beating Minnesota United in penalty kicks. Diego Fagundez nearly scored for Austin from a cross in the 2nd minute but the ball was cleared from the box. Moussa Djitte made his fourth start of the season and scored in the 26th minute from the center of the box following a corner. Sebastian Driussi became the first Austin FC player to score 30 career goals for the club when he doubled the lead in the 29th minute. He intercepted a pass at midfield and ran to the right side of the box and fired a shot to the bottom left post. FC Dallas keeper Maarten Paes saved Alexander Ring's attempt in the 37th minute. FC Dallas generated their first chance in stoppage time, but Austin FC took a 2–0 lead at half where both teams made substitutions. Alan Velasco finally broke through for FC Dallas in the 65th minute, and Paes kept the score 2-1 when he saved another shot from Fagundez a few minutes later. After going back and forth for over twenty minutes, Brad Stuver made a point-blank save on a Jáder Obrian header which Ring cleared, and Dallas wasn't able to generate any other scoring threats in stoppage time. Austin advanced to the Western Conference Final with a 2–1 victory.

Despite winning Copa Tejas three months earlier, this was Austin FC's first victory over FC Dallas in any competition.

==== Western Conference Final at LAFC ====
LAFC advanced to the Western Conference Final on October 20 when MVP finalist Chicho Arango scored in the 93rd minute to give LAFC a 3–2 victory over their crosstown rival LA Galaxy. Arango opened the scoring off a corner in the 29th minute to punctuate a dominant first half for LAFC despite Brad Stuver keeping Austin in the game with 7 first half saves. In the 62nd minute, Maxi Urruti scored an own goal off a corner. A few minutes later, Sebastien Ibeagha stepped on Diego Fagundez's foot in the box, but VAR determined a penalty wouldn't be awarded. In the 81st minute, Kwadwo Opoku collected an Austin clearance that bounced to him at the top of the 18-yard box and fired it in the net to end the scoring at 3–0. LAFC became the first club since Toronto FC to win the Supporters Shield and advance to MLS Cup in the same season.

Despite Austin's season coming to an end, the Verde and Black qualified for the last spot in the 2023 CONCACAF Champions League when the Philadelphia Union defeated NYCFC in the Eastern Conference Final later that night, their first qualification for a continental competition.

== Management team ==
Position	Name
Chairman	(United States) Anthony Precourt
Sporting director	(United States) Claudio Reyna
Head coach	(United States) Josh Wolff
Assistant coach	(United States) Davy Arnaud
Assistant coach	(Chile) Rodrigo Rios
Assistant coach	(United States) Nolan Sheldon
Assistant coach	(United States) Preston Burpo
Chief Scout	(Spain) Manuel Junco

== Roster ==
As of October 30, 2022.

No.	Name	Nationality	Position(s)	Date of birth (age)	Signed in	Previous club	Apps	Goals
Goalkeepers
1	Brad Stuver	(United States)	GK	April 16, 1991 (age 35)	2020	(United States) New York City FC	34	0
12	Damian Las (HG)	(United States)	GK	April 11, 2002 (age 24)	2022	(England) Fulham F.C	0	0
31	Andrew Tarbell	(United States)	GK	October 7, 1993 (age 33)	2020	(United States) Columbus Crew SC	5	0
Defenders
3	Jhohan Romaña	(Colombia)	CB	September 13, 1998 (age 28)	2020	(Paraguay) Guaraní	10	0
4	Ruben Gabrielsen	(Norway)	CB	March 10, 1993 (age 33)	2022	(France) Toulouse FC	37	2
15	Kipp Keller (GA)	(United States)	CB	July 14, 2000 (age 26)	2022	(United States) Saint Louis University	7	0
17	Jon Gallagher	(Republic of Ireland)	LB	February 23, 1996 (age 30)	2020	(United States) Atlanta United FC	36	1
18	Julio Cascante	(Costa Rica)	CB	October 3, 1993 (age 33)	2020	(United States) Portland Timbers	36	3
23	Žan Kolmanič (U22) (Note: https://www.mlssoccer.com/news/mls-launches-u22-initiative-to-support-further-investment-in-young-players)	(Slovenia)	LB	March 3, 2000 (age 26)	2021	(Slovenia) Maribor	23	0
24	Nick Lima	(United States)	RB	November 17, 1994 (age 31)	2020	(United States) San Jose Earthquakes	37	0
26	Charlie Asensio	(United States)	DF	January 18, 2000 (age 26)	2022	(United States) Clemson Tigers	0	0
Midfielders
5	Jhojan Valencia	(Colombia)	MF	July 27, 1996 (age 30)	2022	(Colombia) Deportivo Cali	15	0
6	Daniel Pereira (GA)	(Venezuela)	MF	July 14, 2000 (age 26)	2021	(United States) Virginia Tech Hokies	34	2
8	Alexander Ring (DP) (captain)	(Finland)	MF	April 9, 1991 (age 35)	2020	(United States) New York City FC	37	4
10	Cecilio Domínguez (DP)	(Paraguay)	MF	August 11, 1994 (age 32)	2020	(Argentina) Independiente	4	2
13	Ethan Finlay	(United States)	MF	August 6, 1990 (age 36)	2021	(United States) Minnesota United FC	38	5
14	Diego Fagúndez	(Uruguay)	MF	February 14, 1995 (age 31)	2021	(United States) New England Revolution	38	7
16	Hector Jiménez	(United States)	MF	November 3, 1988 (age 38)	2020	(United States) Columbus Crew SC	15	0
20	Jared Stroud	(United States)	MF	July 10, 1996 (age 30)	2021	(United States) New York Red Bulls	5	0
22	Felipe Martins	(Brazil)	MF	September 30, 1990 (age 36)	2022	(United States) DC United	32	1
33	Owen Wolff (HG)	(United States)	MF	December 30, 2004 (age 21)	2020	(United States) Austin FC Academy	27	0
77	Emiliano Rigoni	(Argentina)	RW	February 4, 1993 (age 33)	2022	(Brazil) São Paulo FC	10	0
Forward
2	Moussa Djitté (U22)	(Senegal)	FW	October 4, 1999 (age 27)	2021	(France) Grenoble	20	5
7	Sebastián Driussi (DP)	(Argentina)	FW	February 9, 1996 (age 30)	2021	(Russia) Zenit Saint Petersburg	38	25
9	Danny Hoesen	(Netherlands)	FW	January 15, 1991 (age 35)	2020	(United States) San Jose Earthquakes	16	3
11	Rodney Redes (U22)	(Paraguay)	FW	February 22, 2000 (age 26)	2020	(Paraguay) Guaraní	13	0
32	Washington Corozo	(Ecuador)	FW	July 9, 1998 (age 28)	2022	(Peru) Sporting Cristal	3	0
37	Maximiliano Urruti	(Argentina)	FW	February 2, 1991 (age 35)	2021	(United States) Houston Dynamo FC	37	9

== Transfers ==
=== In ===
Date	Position	No.	Name	From	Fee	Ref.
November 19, 2021	DF	21	(Slovenia) Žan Kolmanič	(Slovenia) NK Maribor	$1,500,000	
December 17, 2021	FW	20	(United States) Jared Stroud	(United States) Austin FC	Free Transfer	
December 20, 2021	MF	13	(United States) Ethan Finlay	(United States) Minnesota United FC	Free Transfer	
December 28, 2021	FW	37	(Argentina) Maximiliano Urruti	(United States) Houston Dynamo FC	Free Transfer	
January 12, 2022	MF	5	(Colombia) Jhojan Valencia	(Colombia) Deportivo Cali	Undisclosed	
January 24, 2022	MF	4	(Norway) Ruben Gabrielsen	(France) Toulouse FC	Free Transfer	
January 25, 2022	GK	12	(United States) Damian Las	(England) Fulham F.C.	Undisclosed	
February 7, 2022	MF	22	(Brazil) Felipe Martins	(United States) DC United	Free Transfer	
July 29, 2022	FW	77	(Argentina) Emiliano Rigoni	(Brazil) São Paulo FC	$4,000,000	

=== Loan In ===
No.	Pos.	Player	Loaned from	Start	End	Source
32	FW	(Ecuador) Washington Corozo	(Ecuador) Sporting Cristal	July 6, 2022	December 31, 2022	

=== Out ===
Date	Position	No.	Name	To	Type	Fee	Ref.
November 10, 2021	DF	5	(United States) Matt Besler	N/A	Retired	Free	
November 30, 2021	FW	23	(The Gambia) Kekuta Manneh	(United States) San Antonio FC	Option Declined	Free	
November 30, 2021	FW	13	(United States) Aaron Schoenfeld	N/A	Retired	Free	
November 30, 2021	GK	28	(United States) Brady Scott	(United States) Columbus Crew	Option Declined	Free	
November 30, 2021	LB	4	(United States) Aedan Stanley	(United States) Miami FC	Option Declined	Free	
November 30, 2021	LB	22	(United States) Ben Sweat	(United States) Sporting Kansas City	Option Declined	Free	
November 30, 2021	MF	6	(United States) Sebastian Berhalter	(United States) Columbus Crew	Loan Ended	Free	
November 30, 2021	MF	2	(United States) Emanual Perez	(United States) Portland Timbers	Loan Ended	Free	
November 30, 2021	FW	20	(United States) Jared Stroud	(United States) Austin FC	Option Declined	Free	
December 20, 2021	FW	27	(United States) McKinze Gaines	(United States) Charlotte FC	Expansion Draft	$50,000 GAM	
January 25, 2022	LM	12	(Costa Rica) Ulises Segura	(Costa Rica) Deportivo Saprissa	Offseason Buyout	Free	
July 23, 2022	MF	10	(Paraguay) Cecilio Domínguez	(Mexico) Santos Laguna	Mutual Contract Termination	Free	

=== Loan out ===
No.	Pos.	Player	Loaned to	Start	End	Source
7	MF	(Argentina) Tomás Pochettino	(Argentina) River Plate	Jan 10, 2022	December 31, 2022	
34	GK	(United States) Will Pulisic	(United States) North Carolina FC	March 9, 2022	December 31, 2022	
19	DF	(United States) Freddy Kleemann	(United States) Birmingham Legion FC	March 11, 2022	April 20, 2022	
26	DF	(United States) Charlie Asensio	(United States) Charleston Battery	July 8, 2022	December 31, 2022	

=== MLS SuperDraft picks ===
2022 Austin FC SuperDraft Picks
Round	Selection	Player	Position	College	Notes	Ref.
1	5	(United States) Kipp Keller	DF	Saint Louis University	Generation Adidas	
2	7 (35)	(United States) Charlie Asensio	DF	Clemson	Pick acquired from Chicago Fire FC via trade	
3	5 (61)	(United States) Michael Knapp	MF	New York Red Bulls II		

== Non-competitive fixtures ==
=== Preseason ===
January 30, 2022	Austin FC	1–0	Louisville City FC	Austin, Texas
CT				Stadium: St. David's Performance Center; Attendance: 0

February 9, 2022	Austin FC	1–2	Toronto FC	Austin, Texas
CT	Urruti 33'	ATX Tweet; TOR Tweet	Pozuelo 6' (pen.); Perruzza 38'	Stadium: St. David's Performance Center; Attendance: 0

February 12, 2022	Houston Dynamo FC	0–4	Austin FC	Houston, Texas
6:00 CT		Report	Dominguez 16', 18'; Ring 29'; Urruti 62'; Wolff (yellow card) 90+1'	Stadium: PNC Stadium

February 16, 2022	Austin FC	1–1	Atlas FC	Austin, Texas
8:00 PM CT	Driussi 85' (pen.)	Report	Trejo 38'	Stadium: Q2 Stadium; Attendance: 20738

February 19, 2022	Austin FC	0–1	Chicago Fire FC	Austin, Texas
CT		ATX Tweet; CHI Report	Giménez 6'	Stadium: St. David's Performance Center

=== Midseason ===
June 11, 2022	Austin FC	1–4	C.F. Pachuca	Austin, Texas
8:00pm CT	Driussi 47' (pen.)	Report	de la Rosa 3'; Ibáñez 22'; Cabrel 28'; Hernández 42'	Stadium: Q2 Stadium; Attendance: 20,738

== Competitive fixtures ==
=== Overall record ===
Competition	First match	Last match	Starting round	Final position	Record							
Competition	First match	Last match	Starting round	Final position	Pld	W	D	L	GF	GA	GD	Win %
MLS Regular Season	26 February 2022	9 October 2022	Matchday 1	2nd West, 4th MLS	34	16	8	10	65	49	+16	47.06
U.S. Open Cup	20 April 2022	20 April 2022	Third Round	Third Round	1	0	0	1	1	2	−1	0.00
MLS Cup	16 October 2022	30 October 2022	First Round	Western Conference Final	3	2	0	1	4	6	−2	66.67
Total					38	18	8	12	70	57	+13	47.37

Last updated: 31 May 2023
Source: Soccerway

=== Major League Soccer Regular Season ===
==== Standings ====
===== Western Conference =====
Pos	Team	Pld	W	L	T	GF	GA	GD	Pts	Qualification
1	Los Angeles FC	34	21	9	4	66	38	+28	67	Qualification for the conference semifinals and the CONCACAF Champions League
2	Austin FC	34	16	10	8	65	49	+16	56	Qualification for the first round and the CONCACAF Champions League
3	FC Dallas	34	14	9	11	48	37	+11	53	Qualification for the first round
4	LA Galaxy	34	14	12	8	58	51	+7	50	Qualification for the first round
5	Nashville SC	34	13	10	11	52	41	+11	50	Qualification for the first round

Source: MLS
Rules for classification: 1) points; 2) total wins; 3) total goal differential; 4) total goals scored; 5) fewer disciplinary points; 6) away goal differential; 7) away goals scored; 8) home goals differential; 9) home goals scored; 10) coin toss (2 clubs tied) or drawing of lots (≥3 clubs tied)

===== Overall =====
Pos	Team	Pld	W	L	T	GF	GA	GD	Pts	
2	Philadelphia Union	34	19	5	10	72	26	+46	67	Qualification for the CONCACAF Champions League (Note: As 2022 Eastern Conference regular season champions (USA2))
3	CF Montréal (Note: Canadian clubs could not qualify for the 2023 CONCACAF Champions League through the MLS regular season or playoffs.)	34	20	9	5	63	50	+13	65	
4	Austin FC	34	16	10	8	65	49	+16	56	Qualification for the CONCACAF Champions League (Note: As highest-ranked U.S. based Division I club (based on 2022 MLS regular season record) not already qualified (USA3))
5	New York City FC	34	16	11	7	57	41	+16	55	
6	New York Red Bulls	34	15	11	8	50	41	+9	53	

Source: MLS
Rules for classification: 1) points; 2) total wins; 3) total goal differential; 4) total goals scored; 5) fewer disciplinary points; 6) away goal differential; 7) away goals scored; 8) home goals differential; 9) home goals scored; 10) coin toss (2 clubs tied) or drawing of lots (≥3 clubs tied)

==== Matches ====
February 26, 2022 1	Austin FC	5–0	FC Cincinnati	Austin, Texas
5:00 PM CT	Domínguez 2', 61'; Ring 14'; Keller (yellow card) 33'; Driussi 43'; Valencia (yellow card) 74'; Kann 90+3' (o.g.)	Report	Cruz (yellow card) 12'; Kubo (yellow card) 76'	Stadium: Q2 Stadium; Attendance: 20,738; Referee: Ismail Elfath

March 6, 2022 2	Austin FC	5–1	Inter Miami CF	Austin, Texas
3:00 PM CT	Driussi 22', 51'; Cascante 26'; Lima (yellow card) 29'; Urruti (yellow card) 38'; Finlay 64', 90'; Fagúndez (yellow card) 72'	Report	Mota (yellow card) 25'; Yedlin (yellow card) 42'; Campana 53'; Gregore (yellow card) 76'; Higuaín (yellow card) 88'	Stadium: Q2 Stadium; Attendance: 20,738; Referee: Chris Penso

March 12, 2022 3	Portland Timbers	1–0	Austin FC	Portland, Oregon
9:00 PM CT	Y. Chara (yellow card) 53'; Paredes (yellow card) 57'; Tuiloma 62'; Blanco (yellow card) 90+6'	Report	Domínguez (yellow card) 49'; Kolmanič (yellow card) 50'; Driussi (yellow card) 50'; Pereira (yellow card) 60'	Stadium: Providence Park; Attendance: 22,795; Referee: Joseph Dickerson

March 20, 2022 4	Austin FC	1–1	Seattle Sounders FC	Austin, Texas
3:30 PM CT	Fagúndez 70'	Report	Bruin 43'; Ragen (yellow card) 48'; Roldan (yellow card) 77'	Stadium: Q2 Stadium; Attendance: 20,738; Referee: Lukasz Szpala

April 2, 2022 5	San Jose Earthquakes	2–2	Austin FC	San Jose, California
6:30 PM CT	Marie (yellow card) 31'; Ebobisse 70' (pen.); Cowell 72'; Calvo (yellow card) 79'; Bouda (yellow card) 85'	Report	Urruti 11'; Fagúndez (yellow card) 42'; Driussi 52' (pen.); Pereira (yellow card) 71'; Redes (yellow card) 77'	Stadium: PayPal Park; Attendance: 13,062; Referee: Alex Chilowicz

April 10, 2022 6	Austin FC	1–0	Minnesota United FC	Austin, Texas
6:30 PM CT	Cascante (yellow card) 53'; Urruti 58'; Gallagher (yellow card) 90+4'	Report	Trapp (yellow card) 10'; Boxall (yellow card) 67'	Stadium: Q2 Stadium; Attendance: 20,738; Referee: Rosendo Mendoza

April 16, 2022 7	DC United	2–3	Austin FC	Washington D.C.
6:30 PM CT	Kamara 26', 40', (yellow card) 27' (yellow-red card) 45+7'; Robertha (yellow card) 41'; Hopkins (yellow card) 73'; Gressel (yellow card) 78'; Samaké (yellow card) 87'	Report	Ring (yellow card) 35'; Cascante (yellow card) 60'; Pereira (yellow card) 70'; Hoesen 80'; Driussi 85'; Gabrielsen 90'	Stadium: Audi Field; Attendance: 16,840; Referee: Tori Penso

April 23, 2022 8	Austin FC	3–0	Vancouver Whitecaps FC	Austin, Texas
7:30 PM CT	Urruti 11', 26'; Ring (yellow card) 35'; Gabrielsen (yellow card) 45+1'; Driussi 68'; Pereira (yellow card) 90'	Report	Blackmon (yellow card) 25'; Cavallini (yellow card) 75'; White (yellow card) 90+2'	Stadium: Q2 Stadium; Attendance: 20,738; Referee: Ramy Touchan

April 30, 2022 9 Copa Tejas	Houston Dynamo FC	1–2	Austin FC	Houston, Texas
12:30 PM CT	Ferreira 5'; Carrasquilla (yellow card) 47'; Hadebe (yellow card) 50'; Parker (yellow card) 88'	Report	Driussi (yellow card) 36', (goal) 66'; Pereira 39'; Ring (yellow card) 62'	Stadium: PNC Stadium; Attendance: 16,296; Referee: Ted Unkel

May 8, 2022 10	Austin FC	0–1	LA Galaxy	Austin, Texas
6:00 PM CT	Ring (yellow card) 21'	Report	Delgado 6', (yellow card) 14'; Coulibaly (yellow card) 28'; Bond (yellow card) 53'; Williams (yellow card) 67'; Gasper (yellow card) 88'	Stadium: Q2 Stadium; Attendance: 20,738; Referee: Ismail Elfath

May 14, 2022 11	Real Salt Lake	2–1	Austin FC	Sandy, Utah
8:30 PM CT	Chang 55'; Silva (yellow card) 63'; Brody 88'; Caldwell (yellow card) 90+2'	Report	Ring 24'; Driussi (yellow card) 38'; Jiménez (yellow card) 45+2'; Pereira (red card) 47'; Urruti (yellow card) 65'; Valencia (yellow card) 78'	Stadium: Rio Tinto Stadium; Attendance: 20,122; Referee: Lucasz Szpala

May 18, 2022 12	Los Angeles FC	1–2	Austin FC	Los Angeles, California
9:30 PM CT	Acosta (yellow card) 39'; Cifuentes (yellow card) 39'; Murillo (yellow card) 63'; Vela 86' (pen.)	Report	Gabrielsen 13'; Valencia (yellow card) 37'; Wolff (yellow card) 50'; Fagúndez 80'; Stuver (yellow card) 85'; Driussi (yellow card) 89'; Keller (yellow card) 90+7'	Stadium: Banc of California Stadium; Attendance: 22,034; Referee: Armando Villarreal

May 22, 2022 13	Austin FC	2–2	Orlando City SC	Austin, Texas
7:00 PM CT	Driussi 63' (pen.); Djitté 90+5'	Report	Kara 2'; Ruan 22'; Schlegel (yellow card) 58' (yellow-red card) 60'; Pereyra (yellow card) 60'; Araújo (red card) 69'; Jansson (yellow card) 82'; Gallese (yellow card) 90+9'	Stadium: Q2 Stadium; Attendance: 20,738; Referee: Joseph Dickerson

May 29, 2022 14	Los Angeles Galaxy	4–1	Austin FC	Carson, California
3:00pm CT	Chicharito 61'; Jovelić 64', 88', (yellow card) 79'; Raveloson (yellow card) 77'; Efraín Álvarez 79'	Report	Fagúndez 53'	Stadium: Dignity Health Sports Park; Attendance: 20,433; Referee: Rubiel Vazquez

June 18, 2022 15	CF Montreal	0–1	Austin FC	Montreal, Quebec, Canada
6:30 PM CT		Report	Pereira (yellow card) 6' (yellow-red card) 44'; Urruti (yellow card) 45+1', (goal) 67'; Cascante (yellow card) 48'; Gallagher (yellow card) 60'	Stadium: Stade Saputo; Attendance: 15,045; Referee: Ted Unkel

June 25, 2022 16 Copa Tejas	Austin FC	2–2	FC Dallas	Austin, Texas
8:00 PM CT	Jiménez (yellow card) 10'; Gabrielsen (yellow card) 20'; Felipe (yellow card) 45+1'; Driussi 72'; Hoesen 85'	Report	Arriola 58'; Servania 64'; Martínez (yellow card) 82'	Stadium: Q2 Stadium; Attendance: 20,738; Referee: Allen Chapman

June 30, 2022 17	Charlotte FC	0–1	Austin FC	Charlotte, North Carolina
6:00 PM CT		Report	Pereira 62'	Stadium: Bank of America Stadium; Attendance: 31,661; Referee: Timothy Ford

July 4, 2022 18	Colorado Rapids	2–3	Austin FC	Commerce City, Colorado
8:00 PM CT	Abubakar 19'; Lewis 22'	Report	Pereira (yellow card) 18'; Finlay 28'; Keller (yellow card) 41' (yellow-red card) 75'; Driussi 45+1'; Urruti 59'	Stadium: Dick's Sporting Goods Park; Attendance: 18,084; Referee: Joseph Dickerson

July 9, 2022 19	Atlanta United FC	0–3	Austin FC	Atlanta, Georgia
6:00 PM CT	Araújo (yellow card) 25'	Report	Felipe 9'; Finlay 17'; Gallagher (yellow card) 42'; Driussi 57'	Stadium: Mercedes-Benz Stadium; Attendance: 67,516; Referee: Jair Marrufo

July 12, 2022 20 Copa Tejas	Austin FC	3–1	Houston Dynamo	Austin, Texas
8:00 PM CT	Fagúndez 15'; Urruti 57'; Lima (yellow card) 66'; Ring 70'	Report	Carrasquilla 11'; Hadebe (yellow card) 14'; Lundqvist (yellow card) 62'; Herrera (yellow card) 80'	Stadium: Q2 Stadium; Attendance: 20,738; Referee: Chris Penso

July 16, 2022 21 Copa Tejas	FC Dallas	1–1	Austin FC	Frisco, Texas
8:00 PM CT	Arriola 42'; Velasco (yellow card) 70'	Report	Fagúndez 79'; Felipe (yellow card) 90+6'	Stadium: Toyota Stadium; Attendance: 16,833; Referee: Armando Villarreal

July 24, 2022 22	Austin FC	3–4	New York Red Bulls	Austin, Texas
7:00 PM CT	Felipe (yellow card) 4'; Driussi 45', 69'; Ring (yellow card) 57'; Finlay 81'	Report	Ngoma 14'; Klimala (yellow card) 21'; Yearwood 26'; Harper (yellow card) 48', (goal) 51'; Edwards (yellow card) 64'; Barlow 65'	Stadium: Q2 Stadium; Attendance: 20,738; Referee: Guido Gonzales Jr.

July 30, 2022 23	Sporting KC	0–2	Austin FC	Kansas City, Kansas
7:30 PM CT	Duke (yellow card) 39' (yellow-red card) 43'; Sweat (yellow card) 73'	Report	Cascante (yellow card) 25'; Pereira (yellow card) 38'; Urruti (yellow card) 42'; Ring 45+1'; Driussi 90'	Stadium: Children's Mercy Park; Attendance: 17,287; Referee: Fotis Bazakos

August 6, 2022 24	Austin FC	3–3	San Jose Earthquakes	Austin, Texas
8:00 PM CT	Cascante 6'; Driussi (yellow card) 23', (goal) 26', 44'; Stuver (yellow card) 60'	Report	Kikanovic 8'; Marie 20'; Beason (yellow card) 39'; Yueill (yellow card) 84'; Ebobisse 88'	Stadium: Q2 Stadium; Attendance: 20,738; Referee: Lukasz Szpala

August 13, 2022 25	Austin FC	4–3	Sporting KC	Austin, Texas
8:00 PM CT	Gallagher 27'; Cascante 63'; Gabrielsen (yellow card) 68'; Hoesen 85'; Driussi 90+4', (yellow card) 90+5'	Report	Fontàs 12'; Agada 23', (yellow card) 86'; Russell 40' (pen.); Sallói (yellow card) 88'	Stadium: Q2 Stadium; Attendance: 20,738; Referee: Pierre-Luc Lauziere

August 20, 2022 26	Minnesota United FC	2–1	Austin FC	St. Paul, Minnesota
7:00 PM CT	Reynoso 25' (pen.); Fragapane 62'	Report	Driussi 45+2' (pen.); Kolmanič (yellow card) 80'	Stadium: Allianz Field; Attendance: 19,829; Referee: Allen Chapman

August 26, 2022 27	Austin FC	4–1	Los Angeles FC	Austin, Texas
7:00 PM CT	Fagúndez 32', (yellow card) 39'; Urruti (yellow card) 39', (goal) 47', 51'; Driussi 59'	Report	Segura (yellow card) 30'; Crépeau (yellow card) 40'; Murillo (yellow card) 57'; Arango 61'	Stadium: Q2 Stadium; Attendance: 20,738; Referee: Alex Chilowicz

August 31, 2022 28	Austin FC	1–2	Portland Timbers	Austin, Texas
8:00 PM CT	Urruti (yellow card) 30'; Perreira (yellow card) 45+5'; Ring (yellow card) 65'; Driussi 79'	Report	Tuiloma 16'; Župarić (yellow card) 42'; Williamson (yellow card) 67'; McGraw 73'	Stadium: Q2 Stadium; Attendance: 20,738; Referee: Chris Penso

September 3, 2022 29	Nashville SC	3–0	Austin FC	Nashville, Tennessee
7:30 PM CT	Zimmerman 49'; Mukhtar 82', 90+1', (yellow card) 83'	Report	Fagúndez (yellow card) 39'; Cascante (yellow card) 54'; Lima (yellow card) 75'; Djitté (yellow card) 90+4' (yellow-red card) 90+5'	Stadium: Geodis Park; Attendance: 25,293; Referee: Nima Saghafi

September 10, 2022 30	Seattle Sounders FC	3–0	Austin FC	Seattle, Washington
7:00 PM CT	Ruidíaz 12', 33'; Atencio (yellow card) 25'; Roldan (yellow card) 58'; Gabrielsen 68' (o.g.)	Report	Valencia (yellow card) 67'	Stadium: Lumen Field; Attendance: 34,721; Referee: Marcos de Oliveira

September 14, 2022 31	Austin FC	3–0	Real Salt Lake	Austin, Texas
8:00 PM CT	Djitte 60', 76', 80'	Report		Stadium: Q2 Stadium; Attendance: 20,738; Referee: Joseph Dickerson

September 17, 2022 32	Austin FC	1–1	Nashville SC	Austin, Texas
8:00 PM CT	Driussi 61'	Report	Mukhtar 56' (pen.)	Stadium: Q2 Stadium; Attendance: 20,738; Referee: Lukasz Szpala

October 1, 2022 33	Vancouver Whitecaps FC	2–0	Austin FC	Vancouver, British Columbia, Canada
9:00 PM CT	Gauld 7'; Cavallini 62', (yellow card) 90+1'; Blackmon (yellow card) 90+7'	Report	Romaña (yellow card) 18'; Ring (yellow card) 57'; Martins (yellow card) 90+1'; Cascante (yellow card) 90+7'	Stadium: BC Place; Attendance: 19,292; Referee: Timothy Ford

October 9, 2022 34	Austin FC	1–1	Colorado Rapids	Austin, Texas
4:00 PM CT	Driussi 81' (pen.)	Report	Gutiérrez (yellow card) 66'; Rubio (yellow card) 80', (goal) 90+3'	Stadium: Q2 Stadium; Attendance: 20,738; Referee: Pierre-Luc Lauziere

=== MLS Playoffs ===
October 16 MLS Cup Playoffs - Western Conference First Round	Austin FC	2–2 (3–1 p)	Real Salt Lake	Austin, Texas
2:00 PM CT	Driussi 31', 90+4' (pen.); Ring (yellow card) 41'	Report	Córdova 3', 15' (pen.); Rubin (yellow card) 17' (yellow-red card) 52'; Glad (yellow card) 45+4'; Caldwell (yellow card) 90+2'	Stadium: Q2 Stadium; Attendance: 20,738; Referee: Victor Rivas
	Penalties
	Driussi (penalty scored); Fagúndez (penalty scored); Rigoni (penalty scored)		Silva (penalty scored); Brody (penalty missed); Ojeda (penalty missed); Schmitt (penalty missed)

October 23 MLS Cup Playoffs - Western Conference Semifinals	Austin FC	2–1	FC Dallas	Austin, Texas
7:00 PM CT	Djitte 26'; Driussi 29'; Cascante (yellow card) 59'; Rigoni (yellow card) 85'	Report	Quignon (yellow card) 28'; Velasco 65'; Hedges (yellow card) 72'	Stadium: Q2 Stadium; Attendance: 20,738; Referee: Joseph Dickerson

October 30 MLS Cup Playoffs - Western Conference Final	Los Angeles FC	3–0	Austin FC	Los Angeles, California
3:00 PM CT	Arango 29'; Vela (yellow card) 54'; Urruti 62' (o.g.); Opoku 81'	Report	Lima (yellow card) 31'; Rigoni (yellow card) 34'; Urruti (yellow card) 90'	Stadium: Banc of California Stadium; Attendance: 22,175; Referee: Armando Villarreal

=== U.S. Open Cup ===
In the club's first ever U.S. Open Cup appearance Austin FC suffered a "cupset" to San Antonio FC at Toyota Field, losing 2–1 in a game that had to extend into extra time to determine a winner.

April 20 Third Round	San Antonio FC (USLC) (Texas)	2–1 (a.e.t.)	(Texas) Austin FC (MLS)	San Antonio, Texas
7:30 p.m. CDT	Collier (yellow card) 17' (goal) 82'; Gomez (yellow card) 45+1'; Abu (yellow card) 89'; Manley 96'; Sakshaug (yellow card) 120+3'; Farr (yellow card) 120+4'	Report	Jimenez (yellow card) 36'; Fagúndez 47'; Kolmanič (yellow card) 90+5'	Stadium: Toyota Field; Attendance: 7,922; Referee: Brandon Gardner

== Statistics ==
=== Appearances and goals ===
Numbers after plus–sign (+) denote appearances as a substitute.

No.	Pos	Nat	Player	Total		MLS		MLS Cup		U.S. Open Cup	
No.	Pos	Nat	Player	Apps	Goals	Apps	Goals	Apps	Goals	Apps	Goals
1	GK	(United States) USA	Brad Stuver	34	0	31+0	0	3+0	0	0+0	0
2	FW	(Senegal) SEN	Moussa Djitté	20	5	3+14	4	2+1	1	0+0	0
3	DF	(Colombia) COL	Jhohan Romaña	10	0	3+7	0	0+0	0	0+0	0
4	DF	(Norway) NOR	Ruben Gabrielsen	37	2	31+2	2	3+0	0	0+1	0
5	MF	(Colombia) COL	Jhojan Valencia	15	0	4+9	0	1+0	0	1+0	0
6	MF	(Venezuela) VEN	Daniel Pereira	34	2	26+4	2	2+1	0	0+1	0
7	FW	(Argentina) ARG	Sebastián Driussi	38	25	32+2	22	3+0	3	1+0	0
8	MF	(Finland) FIN	Alexander Ring	37	4	32+2	4	3+0	0	0+0	0
9	FW	(Netherlands) NED	Danny Hoesen	16	3	3+11	3	0+1	0	1+0	0
10	MF	(Paraguay) PAR	Cecilio Domínguez	4	2	4+0	2	0+0	0	0+0	0
11	FW	(Paraguay) PAR	Rodney Redes	13	0	0+12	0	0+0	0	0+1	0
12	GK	(United States) USA	Damian Las	0	0	0+0	0	0+0	0	0+0	0
13	MF	(United States) USA	Ethan Finlay	38	5	22+12	5	2+1	0	1+0	0
14	MF	(Uruguay) URU	Diego Fagúndez	38	7	32+2	6	3+0	0	1+0	1
15	DF	(United States) USA	Kipp Keller	7	0	3+3	0	0+0	0	1+0	0
16	DF	(United States) USA	Hector Jiménez	15	0	8+6	0	0+0	0	1+0	0
17	FW	(Republic of Ireland) IRL	Jon Gallagher	36	1	23+9	1	3+0	0	0+1	0
18	DF	(Costa Rica) CRC	Julio Cascante	36	3	31+1	3	3+0	0	1+0	0
19	DF	(United States) USA	Freddy Kleemann	0	0	0+0	0	0+0	0	0+0	0
20	MF	(United States) USA	Jared Stroud	5	0	0+5	0	0+0	0	0+0	0
22	MF	(Brazil) BRA	Felipe Martins	32	1	5+23	1	0+3	0	1+0	0
23	DF	(Slovenia) SLO	Žan Kolmanič	23	0	13+8	0	0+1	0	0+1	0
24	DF	(United States) USA	Nick Lima	37	0	25+9	0	3+0	0	0+0	0
26	DF	(United States) USA	Charlie Asensio	0	0	0+0	0	0+0	0	0+0	0
31	GK	(United States) USA	Andrew Tarbell	5	0	3+1	0	0+0	0	1+0	0
32	FW	(Ecuador) ECU	Washington Corozo	3	0	0+3	0	0+0	0	0+0	0
33	MF	(United States) USA	Owen Wolff	27	0	11+13	0	0+2	0	0+1	0
34	GK	(United States) USA	Will Pulisic	0	0	0+0	0	0+0	0	0+0	0
37	FW	(Argentina) ARG	Maximiliano Urruti	38	9	31+3	9	3+0	0	0+1	0
77	FW	(Argentina) ARG	Emiliano Rigoni	10	0	3+4	0	1+2	0	0+0	0

- Last updated: October 30, 2022
- Source: https://www.austinfc.com/stats/

=== Top scorers ===
Rank	Position	Number	Name	MLS	MLS Cup	U.S. Open Cup	Total
1	FW	7	(Argentina) Sebastián Driussi	22	3	0	25
2	FW	37	(Argentina) Maximiliano Urruti	9	0	0	9
3	MF	14	(Uruguay) Diego Fagúndez	6	0	1	7
4	FW	2	(Senegal) Moussa Djitté	4	1	0	5
4	FW	13	(United States) Ethan Finlay	5	0	0	5
5	MF	8	(Finland) Alexander Ring	4	0	0	4
7	FW	9	(Netherlands) Danny Hoesen	3	0	0	3
7	DF	18	(Costa Rica) Julio Cascante	3	0	0	3
9	DF	4	(Norway) Ruben Gabrielsen	2	0	0	2
9	MF	6	(Venezuela) Daniel Pereira	2	0	0	2
9	MF	10	(Paraguay) Cecilio Domínguez	2	0	0	2
12	DF	17	(Republic of Ireland) Jon Gallagher	1	0	0	1
12	MF	22	(Brazil) Felipe	1	0	0	1
Total				65	4	1	70

- Last updated: October 30, 2022
- Source: https://www.austinfc.com/stats/

=== Top assists ===
Rank	Position	Number	Name	MLS	MLS Cup	U.S. Open Cup	Total
1	MF	14	(Uruguay) Diego Fagúndez	15	1	0	16
2	FW	7	(Argentina) Sebastián Driussi	7	0	1	8
3	MF	8	(Finland) Alexander Ring	7	0	0	7
4	FW	13	(United States) Ethan Finlay	6	0	0	6
5	RB	24	(United States) Nick Lima	5	0	0	5
6	DF	17	(Republic of Ireland) Jon Gallagher	4	0	0	4
6	DF	18	(Costa Rica) Julio Cascante	4	0	0	4
8	MF	6	(Venezuela) Daniel Pereira	3	0	0	3
8	DF	16	(United States) Hector Jiménez	3	0	0	3
8	MF	22	(Brazil) Felipe Martins	3	0	0	3
11	FW	2	(Senegal) Moussa Djitté	2	0	0	2
11	DF	4	(Norway) Ruben Gabrielsen	2	0	0	2
11	LB	23	(Slovenia) Žan Kolmanič	2	0	0	2
11	FW	37	(Argentina) Maximiliano Urruti	2	0	0	2
15	MF	5	(Colombia) Jhojan Valencia	1	0	0	1
15	DF	15	(United States) Kipp Keller	1	0	0	1
15	FW	32	(Ecuador) Washington Corozo	1	0	0	1
15	MF	33	(United States) Owen Wolff	1	0	0	1
Total				67	1	1	69

- Last updated: October 30, 2022
- Source: https://www.austinfc.com/stats/

=== Disciplinary record ===
No.	Pos.	Player	MLS			MLS Cup			U.S. Open Cup			Total		
No.	Pos.	Player	Yellow card	(yellow card) (yellow-red card)	Red card	Yellow card	(yellow card) (yellow-red card)	Red card	Yellow card	(yellow card) (yellow-red card)	Red card	Yellow card	(yellow card) (yellow-red card)	Red card
1	GK	(United States) Brad Stuver	2	0	0	0	0	0	0	0	0	2	0	0
2	FW	(Senegal) Moussa Djitté	0	1	0	0	0	0	0	0	0	0	1	0
3	CB	(Colombia) Jhohan Romaña	1	0	0	0	0	0	0	0	0	1	0	0
4	CB	(Norway) Ruben Gabrielsen	3	0	0	0	0	0	0	0	0	3	0	0
5	MF	(Colombia) Jhojan Valencia	5	0	0	0	0	0	0	0	0	5	0	0
6	MF	(Venezuela) Daniel Pereira	8	1	1	0	0	0	0	0	0	8	1	1
7	FW	(Argentina) Sebastián Driussi	7	0	0	0	0	0	0	0	0	7	0	0
8	MF	(Finland) Alexander Ring	7	0	0	1	0	0	0	0	0	8	0	0
10	FW	(Paraguay) Cecilio Domínguez	1	0	0	0	0	0	0	0	0	1	0	0
11	FW	(Paraguay) Rodney Redes	1	0	0	0	0	0	0	0	0	1	0	0
14	MF	(Uruguay) Diego Fagúndez	4	0	0	0	0	0	0	0	0	4	0	0
15	CB	(United States) Kipp Keller	3	1	0	0	0	0	0	0	0	3	1	0
16	DF	(United States) Hector Jiminez	2	0	0	0	0	0	1	0	0	3	0	0
17	DF	(Republic of Ireland) Jon Gallagher	3	0	0	0	0	0	0	0	0	3	0	0
18	CB	(Costa Rica) Julio Cascante	6	0	0	1	0	0	0	0	0	7	0	0
22	MF	(Brazil) Felipe Martins	5	0	0	0	0	0	0	0	0	5	0	0
23	LB	(Slovenia) Žan Kolmanič	2	0	0	0	0	0	1	0	0	3	0	0
24	RB	(United States) Nick Lima	3	0	0	1	0	0	0	0	0	4	0	0
33	MF	(United States) Owen Wolff	1	0	0	0	0	0	0	0	0	1	0	0
37	FW	(Argentina) Maximiliano Urruti	6	0	0	1	0	0	0	0	0	7	0	0
77	FW	(Argentina) Emiliano Rigoni	0	0	0	2	0	0	0	0	0	2	0	0
Total			67	3	1	6	0	0	2	0	0	75	3	1

- Last updated: October 30, 2022
- Source: https://www.austinfc.com/stats/

=== Clean sheets ===
Rank	Number	Name	MLS	Playoffs	U.S. Open Cup	Total
1	1	(United States) Brad Stuver	8	0	0	8

- Last updated: October 30, 2022
- Source: https://www.austinfc.com/stats/

== Awards and honors ==
=== MLS Best XI ===
Award	Awardee	Position	Ref
MLS Best XI	(Argentina) Sebastián Driussi	MF	

=== MLS All Star Team ===
Award	Awardee	Position	Ref
MLS All-Star Team	(Argentina) Sebastián Driussi	MF	

=== End-of-season awards ===
Award	Winner	Ref
Defensive Player of the Year	(United States) Brad Stuver (Note: Second Year in a Row)	
Offensive Player of the Year	(Argentina) Sebastián Driussi	

=== MLS Player of the Month ===
Month	Player	Position	Ref
April	(Argentina) Sebastián Driussi	MF	
July	(Argentina) Sebastián Driussi	MF	

=== MLS Player of the Week ===
Month	Player	Position	Ref
Week 31	(Senegal) Moussa Djitté	FW	

=== MLS Team of the Week ===
Week	Player	Opponent	Position	Ref
1	(Paraguay) Cecilio Domínguez	FC Cincinnati	LW	
2	(Argentina) Sebastián Driussi	Inter Miami CF	MF	
2	(United States) Ethan Finlay	Inter Miami CF	Bench	
2	(United States) Josh Wolff	Inter Miami CF	Coach	
7	(Norway) Ruben Gabrielsen	DC United	CB	
7	(Uruguay) Diego Fagúndez	DC United	Bench	
8	(Argentina) Maximiliano Urruti	Vancouver Whitecaps FC	FW	
8	(Argentina) Sebastián Driussi (2)	Vancouver Whitecaps FC	Bench	
9	(Argentina) Sebastián Driussi (3)	Houston Dynamo FC	MF	
9	(United States) Andrew Tarbell	Houston Dynamo FC	Bench	
12	(Argentina) Sebastián Driussi (4)	Los Angeles FC	MF	
12	(Norway) Ruben Gabrielsen (2)	Los Angeles FC	DF	
12	(United States) Brad Stuver	Los Angeles FC	GK	
13	(Argentina) Sebastián Driussi (5)	Orlando City SC	MF	
15	(Republic of Ireland) Jon Gallagher	CF Montreal	DF	
15	(United States) Brad Stuver (2)	CF Montreal	Bench	
15	(United States) Josh Wolff (2)	CF Montreal	Coach	
16	(Argentina) Sebastián Driussi (6)	FC Dallas	Bench	
17	(Venezuela) Daniel Pereira	Charlotte FC	MF	
17	(United States) Brad Stuver (3)	Charlotte FC	Bench	
18	(Republic of Ireland) Jon Gallagher (2)	Colorado Rapids	DF	
18	(Argentina) Sebastián Driussi (7)	Colorado Rapids	Bench	
19	(United States) Ethan Finlay (2)	Atlanta United FC	RW	
19	(United States) Brad Stuver (4)	Atlanta United FC	GK	
20	(Uruguay) Diego Fagúndez (2)	Houston Dynamo FC	MF	
20	(Norway) Ruben Gabrielsen (3)	Houston Dynamo FC	Bench	
21	(Uruguay) Diego Fagúndez (3)	FC Dallas	Bench	
22	(Argentina) Sebastián Driussi (8)	New York Red Bulls	Bench	
23	(Argentina) Sebastián Driussi (9)	Sporting Kansas City	MF	
24	(Argentina) Sebastián Driussi (10)	San Jose Earthquakes	MF	
25	(Argentina) Sebastián Driussi (11)	Sporting Kansas City	MF	
27	(Uruguay) Diego Fagúndez (4)	LAFC	FW	
27	(Costa Rica) Julio Cascante	LAFC	Bench	
27	(United States) Josh Wolff (3)	LAFC	Coach	
31	(Senegal) Moussa Djitté	Real Salt Lake	FW	
31	(United States) Brad Stuver (5)	Real Salt Lake	Bench	
31	(United States) Josh Wolff (4)	Real Salt Lake	Coach	

=== MLS Goal of the Week ===
Week	Player	Opponent	Ref
17	(Venezuela) Daniel Pereira	Charlotte FC	
20	(Uruguay) Diego Fagúndez	Houston Dynamo FC	
22	(Argentina) Sebastián Driussi	New York Red Bulls	
27	(Uruguay) Diego Fagúndez	LAFC	
