= Jhohan Romaña =

Colombian footballer (born 1998)

Personal information
- Full name: Jhohan Sebastián Romaña Espitia
- Date of birth: 13 September 1998 (age 28)
- Place of birth: Apartadó, Colombia
- Height: 6 ft 2 in (1.87 m)
- Position: Defender

Team information
- Current team: León
- Number: 14

Youth career
- 2006–2019: Independiente Medellín

Senior career*
Years	Team	Apps	(Gls)
2016–2019	Independiente Medellín	1	(0)
2019–2020	Guaraní	19	(0)
2021–2023	Austin FC	35	(0)
2023	→ Club Olimpia (loan)	15	(0)
2024–2026	San Lorenzo	87	(0)
2026–	León	14	(0)
- * Club domestic league appearances and goals as of 16:45, 4 June 2026 (UTC)

Jhohan Sebastián Romaña Espitia (born 13 September 1998) is a Colombian professional footballer who plays as a defender for Liga MX club León.

== Club career ==
Born in Apartadó, Romaña began his career with Categoría Primera A club Independiente Medellín. He made his professional debut for the club on 24 April 2016 against Águilas Doradas, coming on as a 68th-minute substitute in a 2–0 victory. In 2019, Romaña joined Paraguayan Primera División club Guaraní. His debut for the club came on 1 December 2019 against Sol de América, starting in the 1–0 defeat.

=== Austin FC ===
On 22 December 2020, Romaña joined American Major League Soccer club Austin FC ahead of their inaugural season in 2021. He made his debut for Austin FC on 17 April 2021 in their inaugural match against Los Angeles FC, starting in the 2–0 away defeat. Romaña spent the 2023 season on loan with Paraguayan side Club Olimpia. Prior to the 2024 season, Austin FC announced they traded Romaña to the Argentine side San Lorenzo de Almagro.

== Botafogo ==
In October 2025, Botafogo showed interest in signing Jhohan Romaña, according to the Argentine press. Botafogo intends to present an offer below the US$4 million demanded by San Lorenzo for the player's transfer. However, the club would be willing to pay a large part of the amount upfront.

== Career statistics ==
As of 14 November 2023

Appearances and goals by club, season and competition
Club	Season	League			National Cup		Continental		Other		Total	
Club	Season	Division	Apps	Goals	Apps	Goals	Apps	Goals	Apps	Goals	Apps	Goals
Independiente Medellín	2016	Primera A	1	0	1	0	0	0	—		2	0
Independiente Medellín	Club Total		1	0	1	0	0	0	0	0	2	0
Guaraní	2019	Primera División	1	0	0	0	—		—		1	0
Guaraní	2020	Primera División	18	0	—		12 (Note: Appearance(s) in Copa Libertadores)	1	1 (Note: Appearance(s) in Paraguayan Primera División Playoffs)	0	31	1
Guaraní	Club Total		19	0	0	0	12	1	1	0	32	1
Austin FC	2021	MLS	25	0	—		—		—		25	0
Austin FC	2022	MLS	10	0	0	0	—		0	0	10	0
Austin FC	2023	MLS	0	0	0	0	0	0	0	0	0	0
Club Olimpia (loan)	2023	Paraguayan Primera División	13	0	1	0	6	0	—		20	0
Club Olimpia (loan)	Club Total		48	0	1	0	6	0	0	0	55	0
Career Total			68	0	2	0	18	1	1	0	89	1

== Honours ==
Independiente Medellín

- Categoría Primera A: 2016-I
