= Will Pulisic =

American soccer player (born 1998)

Personal information
- Full name: William Pulisic
- Date of birth: April 16, 1998 (age 28)
- Place of birth: Mechanicsville, Virginia, U.S.
- Height: 5 ft 11 in (1.80 m)
- Position: Goalkeeper

Youth career
- Richmond United
- 2016–2017: Borussia Dortmund

College career
| Years | Team | Apps | (Gls) |
| 2017–2020 | Duke Blue Devils | 66 | (0) |

Senior career*
| Years | Team | Apps | (Gls) |
| 2017 | North Carolina FC U23 | 2 | (0) |
| 2018 | Colorado Rapids U23 | 5 | (0) |
| 2019 | North Carolina FC U23 | 0 | (0) |
| 2021–2022 | Austin FC | 0 | (0) |
| 2022 | → North Carolina FC (loan) | 22 | (0) |
| 2023 | Minnesota United 2 | 0 | (0) |

International career
| 2015 | United States U17 | 24 | (0) |
| | United States U19 | 4 | (0) |
- * Club domestic league appearances and goals as of July 16, 2024

William Pulisic (born April 16, 1998) is an American professional soccer player who plays as a goalkeeper.

== Youth career ==
Pulisic had played for Richmond United in his youth career. He, like his cousin Christian, who used to play at Borussia Dortmund, played with the Borussia Dortmund U19 team, making 8 appearances.

On July 7, 2017, Pulisic joined North Carolina FC U23 for the remainder of the 2017 season. In 2018, he also played in the PDL for Colorado Rapids U23 and again in 2019, returning to North Carolina FC U23's, but without making an appearance.

== Club career ==
On April 16, 2021, Pulisic signed with Major League Soccer club Austin FC. Pulisic was loaned to USL League One side North Carolina FC on March 9, 2022. Pulisic was released by Austin following their 2022 season. On January 26, 2023, Pulisic signed a one-year contract with Minnesota United FC's MLS Next Pro team, MNUFC2.

== International career ==
Pulisic has represented the U.S. at the youth international level. In 2015, he had been called up and was included in the final 23 man squad of the national under-17 team for the 2015 FIFA U-17 World Cup in Chile, along with his cousin, Christian, with 24 appearances.

He also made four appearances with national under-19 team.

== Career statistics ==
As of 13 August 2022

| Club | Season | Division | League | | Open Cup | | MLS Cup | | Total | |
| Club | Season | Division | Apps | Shutouts | Apps | Shutouts | Apps | Shutouts | Apps | Shutouts |
|---|---|---|---|---|---|---|---|---|---|---|
| Austin FC | 2021 | MLS | 0 | 0 | — | | — | | 0 | 0 |
| Austin FC | 2022 | MLS | 0 | 0 | — | | — | | 0 | 0 |
| North Carolina FC (loan) | 2022 | USL1 | 14 | 2 | 1 | 0 | — | | 15 | 2 |
| Career Total | | | 14 | 2 | 1 | 0 | 0 | 0 | 15 | 2 |

== Personal life ==
Will Pulisic was born in Mechanicsville, Virginia on April 16, 1998. He is the cousin of AC Milan player Christian Pulisic.
