= Rodney Redes =

Paraguayan footballer (born 2000)

Personal information
- Full name: Rodney Iván Redes Cáceres
- Date of birth: 22 February 2000 (age 26)
- Place of birth: La Colmena, Paraguay
- Height: 1.73 m (5 ft 8 in)
- Position: Winger

Team information
- Current team: LDU Quito (on loan from Olimpia)
- Number: 7

Youth career
- –2018: Guaraní

Senior career*
Years	Team	Apps	(Gls)
2018–2020	Guaraní	66	(7)
2020–2023	Austin FC	48	(1)
2020	→ Guaraní (loan)	34	(4)
2024–	Olimpia	83	(19)
2026–	→ LDU Quito (loan)	11	(2)
- * Club domestic league appearances and goals as of 20 June 2026

Rodney Iván Redes Cáceres (born 22 February 2000) is a Paraguayan professional footballer who plays as a winger for LDU Quito, on loan from Olimpia.

== Career ==
In July 2020, he was transferred from Club Guaraní to Austin FC as the clubs first ever signing. He remained on loan with Club Guaraní through 2020, and joined Austin FC in January 2021. On October 29, 2021, Redes underwent left knee surgery. On November 17, 2023, Austin FC announced they would not exercise the 2024 option for Redes.

== Personal life ==
In January 2022, Redes obtained a U.S. green card, which qualified him as a domestic player for MLS roster purposes.

== Career statistics ==
=== Club ===
As of 24 September 2023

Appearances and goals by club, season and competition
Club	Season	League			National Cup		Continental		Other (Note: Includes appearance(s) in Leagues Cup)		Total	
Club	Season	Division	Apps	Goals	Apps	Goals	Apps	Goals	Apps	Goals	Apps	Goals
Guaraní	2018	Primera División	26	4	0	0	—		—		26	4
Guaraní	2019	Primera División	40	3	0	0	2 (Note: Appearance(s) in Copa Sudamericana)	0	—		42	3
Guaraní (loan)	2020	Primera División	32	4	0	0	13 (Note: Appearance(s) in Copa Libertadores)	3	—		45	7
Guaraní (loan)	Club Total		98	11	0	0	15	3	—		113	14
Austin FC	2021	MLS	25	0	—		—		—		25	0
Austin FC	2022	MLS	12	0	1 (Note: Appearance(s) in U.S. Open Cup)	0	—		0	0	13	0
Austin FC	2023	MLS	11	1	2	1	1 (Note: Appearance(s) in CONCACAF Champions League)	0	2 (Note: Appearance(s) in Leagues Cup)	0	15	2
Austin FC	Club Total		48	1	3	1	1	0	2	0	54	2
Career total			146	12	3	1	16	3	2	0	167	16
