= Freddy Kleemann =

American soccer player (born 1999)

Personal information
- Full name: Frederik Gerd Kleemann
- Date of birth: March 19, 1999 (age 27)
- Place of birth: Newbury Park, California, United States
- Height: 1.93 m (6 ft 4 in)
- Position: Defender

Team information
- Current team: Sacramento Republic
- Number: 6

Youth career
- 2008–2015: Eastside FC
- 2015–2017: Real So Cal

College career
Years	Team	Apps	(Gls)
2017–2020	Washington Huskies	28	(1)

Senior career*
Years	Team	Apps	(Gls)
2019	Ventura County Fusion	7	(0)
2021–2022	Austin FC	3	(0)
2021	→ Birmingham Legion (loan)	1	(0)
2022	→ Birmingham Legion (loan)	2	(0)
2023–2024	Tampa Bay Rowdies	55	(1)
2025–	Sacramento Republic	43	(1)
- * Club domestic league appearances and goals as of November 11, 2026

Frederik Gerd Kleemann (born March 19, 1999) is an American professional soccer player who plays as a defender who currently plays for Sacramento Republic in the USL Championship.

== Early life ==
Frederik "Freddy" Kleemann was born to Gerd and Doris Kleemann, German immigrants from Großheide. His father Gerd is one of the co-founders, of FC Hasental. Freddy Kleemann played club soccer as a Center Midfielder and Captain with Eastside FC in the Washington State Regional Club League (RCL) Division 1 for 6 years from 2008 to 2015. During the 2013–2014 season, he led his team to the Nike Crossfire Challenge Championship, winning the Regional Club League (RCL), and Quarterfinalist in the Washington State Cup. During the 2014–2015 season, he led his team to San Diego Surf Cup Championship, winning the Presidents' Day Tournament (PDT) in Phoenix, to second place in the Far West Regional League (FWRL) and Regional Club League (RCL) Division 1, and to the semi-final in the Washington State Cup. He was selected twice for the Elite Player Development (EPD) program, representing Washington State at the Region IV Olympic Development Program (ODP) Championships in 2014 (finalist) and 2015 (3rd place) and was invited to the Sounders FC Discovery Camp in April 2015. He was also a two-year letter winner at Mercer Island High School, helping the team as a Freshman to the Washington State final in 2014 after a 12–0 season and the Washington State KingCo Championship as a Sophomore in 2015. After relocating to Newbury Park in California in 2015, he joined the Real So Cal academy (now LAFC So Cal Youth) as a Center Back, making it to the Elite 8 in the national playoffs. Outside of soccer, in 2010 he became the 800-meter champion at the USATF Junior Olympics State and Regional Championships and finished second in both in 2011. In 2012 he finished No. 12 in the nation in the 800-meter dash.

== College career ==
In 2017, Freddy Kleemann joined the Washington Huskies men's soccer program while attending the University of Washington to play college soccer. He went on to make 28 appearances for the Huskies. In 2018, Freddy Kleemann helped Washington to take home the gold medal with a 1–0 victory over Brazil while representing the United States in the FISU (International University Sports Federation) America Games in São Paulo, Brazil. In 2019, as a Redshirt Sophomore, he helped Washington to the PAC-12 Championship and the quarterfinal game in the NCAA tournament where they lost 2:1 against the later NCAA Champions Georgetown. During this 2019 season, Freddy Kleemann appeared in 19 matches and made 16 starts while playing the fourth-most minutes on the team (1,653 minutes). He helped anchor Washington's defense which recorded 12 shutouts, surrendered just 14 goals, and finished ninth in NCAA with a 0.66 goals against average, He scored his first collegiate goal against UCLA (9/22/2019), heading home a corner for the match's second goal in a 5–0 win and recorded his first assist with a helper on Washington's lone goal at CSUN (9/12/2019). winning the 2019 Pac-12 Championship, scoring a single goal, and tallying a single assist. He was named to the Pac-12 Academic Honor Roll in 2019. He did not play college soccer the entire 2020 Pac-12 Conference season because it was canceled as a response to the COVID-19 pandemic.

In 2019, Kleemann also spent the summer playing in the USL League Two for Ventura County Fusion, making a single appearance for the club.

== Professional Club career ==
On January 21, 2021, Freddy Kleemann was selected 11th overall in the 2021 MLS SuperDraft by Austin FC ahead of their inaugural season in MLS. He signed the club on February 9, 2021.

On May 14, 2021, Freddy Kleemann was loaned to USL Championship side Birmingham Legion for the 2021 season. He made his professional debut on May 22, 2021, appearing as a 76th-minute substitute during a 2–1 loss to San Antonio FC. However, he was recalled to Austin ahead of their fixture against Seattle Sounders FC on May 30, 2021.

On March 11, 2022, Freddy Kleemann returned to Birmingham Legion, joining them for another season-long loan spell. On March 13, 2022, Freddy Kleemann helped the Legion to a 1:1 draw against the Tampa Bay Rowdies by completing the most passes (87) in the match with a pass accuracy of 89% of which 14 passes were directed into the final third. A week later, on March 19, he sustained an ACL injury in the first half against FC Tulsa, which sidelined him for the rest of the season.

Freddy Kleemann was released by Austin following the 2022 season.

Kleemann signed with the Tampa Bay Rowdies on December 23, 2022. He left Tampa Bay following their 2024 season.

On February 12, 2025, Kleemann joined USL Championship side Sacramento Republic.

== Career statistics ==
As of 11 March 2022

Appearances and goals by club, season and competition
Club	Season	League			National Cup		Continental		Total	
Club	Season	Division	Apps	Goals	Apps	Goals	Apps	Goals	Apps	Goals
Birmingham Legion (loan)	2021	USL Championship	1	0	—		—		1	0
Birmingham Legion (loan)	2022	USL Championship	2	0	—		—		2	0
Birmingham Legion (loan)	Club Total		3	0	0	0	0	0	3	0
Austin FC	2021	MLS	3	0	—		—		3	0
Austin FC	2022	MLS	0	0	—		—		0	0
Austin FC	Club Total		3	0	0	0	0	0	3	0
Career total			6	0	0	0	0	0	6	0
