= Diego Fagúndez =

Uruguayan footballer (born 1995)

- Fagúndez with the New England Revolution in 2026

Personal information
- Full name: Diego Santiago Fagúndez Pepe
- Date of birth: 14 February 1995 (age 31)
- Place of birth: Montevideo, Uruguay
- Height: 1.73 m (5 ft 8 in)
- Positions: Attacking midfielder; forward

Team information
- Current team: New England Revolution
- Number: 77

Youth career
- 2000–2007: Leominster Youth Soccer
- 2007–2009: Greater Boston Bolts
- 2009–2010: New England Revolution

Senior career*
Years	Team	Apps	(Gls)
2011–2020	New England Revolution	261	(53)
2021–2023	Austin FC	86	(15)
2023–2025	LA Galaxy	77	(11)
2026–	New England Revolution	19	(0)

International career
2012–2015	Uruguay U20	8	(0)
Medal record
Men's football
Representing Uruguay
South American U-20 Championship
Third place	2015 Uruguay
- * Club domestic league appearances and goals as of 03:57, 8 November 2026 (UTC)

Diego Santiago Fagúndez Pepe (born 14 February 1995) is a Uruguayan professional footballer who plays as an attacking midfielder for Major League Soccer club New England Revolution.

== Early life ==
Born in Montevideo, Uruguay, Fagúndez moved with his family to Leominster, Massachusetts when he was five years old. Fagúndez began his career playing for Leominster Youth Soccer.

He then went on to play for FC United (Massachusetts) and FC Greater Boston Bolts, before joining the New England Revolution academy team in 2009. He was a State Cup finalist with FC United 2005 and winner in 2006. He won the State Cup with FC Greater Boston Bolts in 2008 and 2009. He also played for the Massachusetts Olympic Development Program (ODP) from 2006 to 2009, as captain from 2008 to 2009.

He was named a 2007–2008 Adidas Interregional All-Star as a member of the Region I ODP team. In his debut season he led the Revs' U-16 squad to a 14–7–8 record (50 pts), placing first in the Northeast Division of the US Soccer Development Academy. He scored 20 goals in 30 appearances, tying Felix Debona for the team lead in goals.

On 10 March 2011, Top Drawer Soccer named Fagúndez their number one ranked player nationally in the class of 2013.

== Club career ==
=== New England Revolution ===
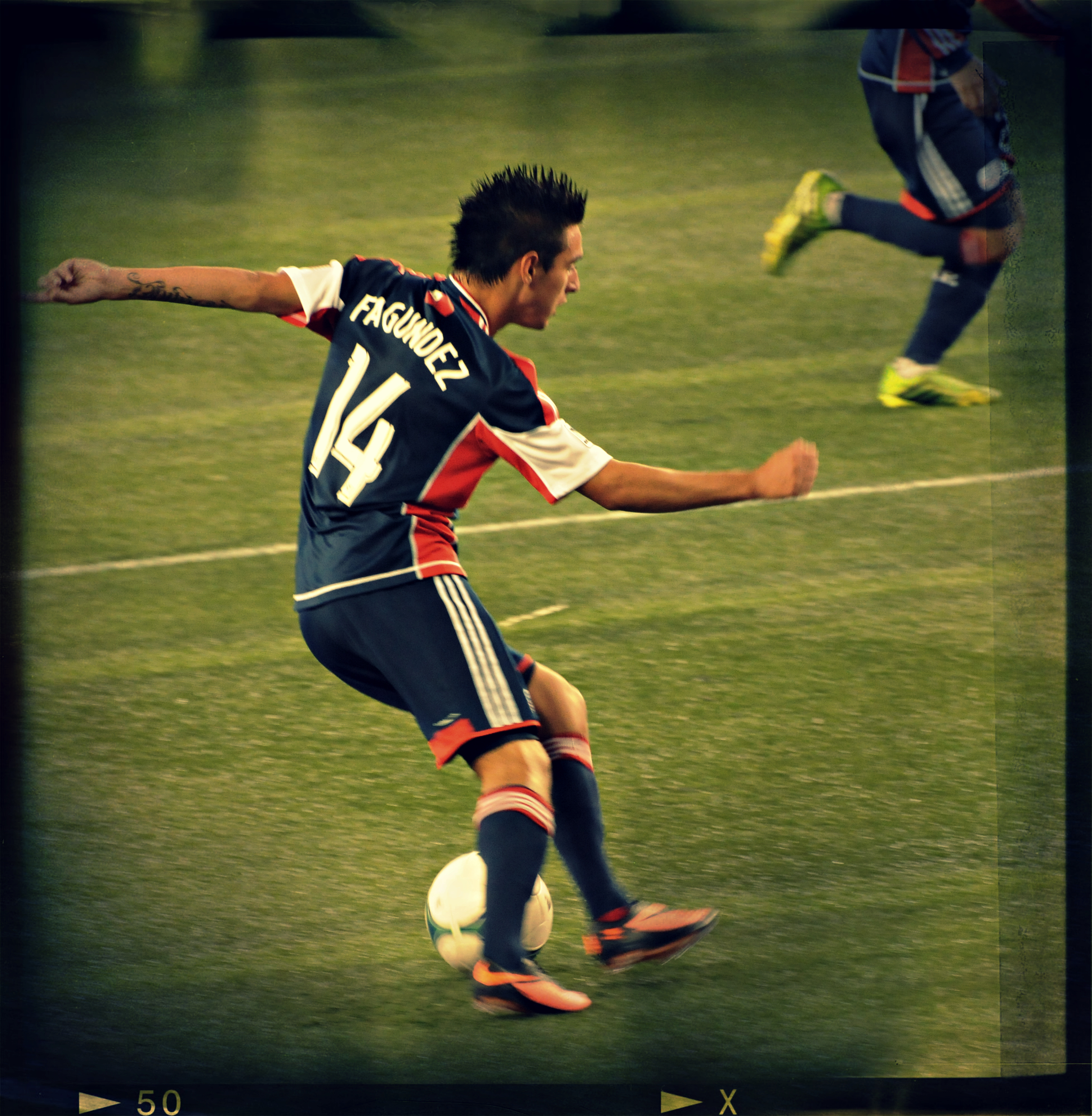
Fagúndez playing for the Revolution against Chicago Fire FC in 2013.

On 15 November 2010, Fagúndez was signed to a contract by the New England Revolution, making him the first ever homegrown player the Revolution signed from its youth academy. Although on the main club roster, he continued to train with and play for the academy team.

He made his full professional debut on 26 April 2011, in a Revs' 3–2 victory over D.C. United in the Lamar Hunt US Open Cup. He made his league debut on August 6, 2011, as a substitute against Chivas USA, where he drew a penalty (which was converted by Shalrie Joseph) and scored his first goal for New England.

Fagúndez became a regular starter for the New England Revolution in 2013, when he had a successful breakout season, scoring 13 goals and assisting 7. Fagúndez quickly became one of MLS's great young talents, and won player of the week honors in week 14 of the 2013 MLS season. Fagúndez obtained a US green card in October 2013 qualifying him as a domestic player under MLS squad rules. He was featured on an episode of documentary television show that MLS 36 in August 2013. MLS listed Fagúndez at no. 5 on its annual "24 under 24" list of best young players for the 2013 season.

Prior to the start of the 2015 season, rumors emerged of interest in Fagúndez from Serie A sides Atalanta B.C. and ACF Fiorentina, Neither side, however, was willing to match the $4 million fee asked by the Revolution for Fagúndez's services. During the 2015 season, Fagúndez became the youngest player in MLS history to reach 100 appearances for his club. Fagúndez was named the Midnight Riders Man of Year at the conclusion of the 2017 MLS season.

On 28 October 2018, prior to the Revolution's final match of the 2018 season, Fagúndez's father (who also serves as his agent) posted a tweet insinuating that it could be his son's final appearance for the franchise. The match, against the Montreal Impact, saw Fagúndez's 50th career MLS goal. He is currently the youngest player in MLS history to score 50 goals. On 22 January 2019, multiple sources reported that the Revolution turned down an offer from Club Nacional de Football for Fagúndez. The Revolution exercised Fagúndez's 2020 contract option prior to the start of the 2020 season. Fagúndez made his 244th appearance for the Revolution in the franchises' 2020 season opener against the Chicago Fire, tying Jay Heaps for fourth most appearances all time.

Going into the final match of the 2020 regular season against the Philadelphia Union, Fagúndez was one appearance shy of breaking the Revolution's all-time appearance record, held by Shalrie Joseph. Fagúndez did not appear in the match, thus ending the season one appearance shy of breaking the record. The Revolution lost the match 2–0.

On 20 November 2020, as Fagúndez was nearing the end of his contract with the Revolution, news emerged that Fagúndez had received an offer for a contract extension from the Revolution as well as interest from other MLS clubs, and clubs in La Liga and Liga MX. In 2016, Fagúndez had signed a three-year contract plus a club option for a fourth year.

On 8 December 2020, the Revolution announced their end of season roster moves. Fagúndez was listed as out of contract with the franchise. On his personal Instagram account, he posted a farewell statement to the Revolution and their fans stating that it was time for him to move on. In an interview with The Boston Globe's Frank Dell'Apa, Fagúndez stated that he wanted to remain with the team, but felt a low-ball offer was presented, and he declined to accept it.

=== Austin FC ===
On 5 January 2021, Fagúndez signed a one-year deal with Austin FC. On 24 April 2021, Fagúndez made his first starting appearance for his new team, and scored the first goal in the franchise's history in its 3–1 win over the Colorado Rapids. He would score again the following week, this time notching the game winner in the franchise's 1–0 win over Minnesota United FC. He was the Man of the Match for Austin's first-ever home match in a 0–0 draw against the San Jose Earthquakes and quickly became a fan favorite.

Fagúndez scored his first goal of the 2022 season, an equalizer in a 1–1 draw against Seattle Sounders FC as a substitute. He also had Austin's first ever goal in national competition play in a 2–1 loss to San Antonio FC of the 2022 U.S. Open Cup on 20 April. Three days later, Fagúndez had two second half assists to come back from 2–0 and win 3–2 at D.C. United including the game-winning goal.

In February 2023, Fagúndez signed a new three-year contract with a club option for a fourth year. At the time of signing he was the club's all-time leader in assists with 20, having added 15 during the 2022 season. After a difficult Austin start to the 2023 season, Fagúndez received criticism from head coach Josh Wolff that he was not living up to his new contract.

=== LA Galaxy ===
On 1 August 2023, Fagúndez was traded to the LA Galaxy in return for Memo Rodríguez, $300,000 in General Allocation Money and potentially another $600,000 in General Allocation Money add-ons. The trade was not popular with Austin supporters, and was criticized as "desperate, over-reactionary, and frankly tone-deaf." Fagúndez scored his first goal for the Galaxy, an 82nd-minute game winner, on 21 September 2023, in a 4–3 victory over Minnesota United.

On 13 April 2024, Fagúndez scored his first goal of the 2024 LA Galaxy season, and in doing so became only the 10th player in MLS history to record at least 70 goals and 70 assists in regular-season play. He also tied Bobby Boswell for 20th all-time amongst all players in MLS history in regular-season games played, with 366. Fagúndez made his 400th career MLS appearance (across both regular season and playoff matches) on 26 October in the Galaxy's 5–0 victory over the Colorado Rapids 2024 MLS Cup Playoffs Round One first match. He and the Galaxy would go on to win the MLS Cup defeating the New York Redbulls 2-1 in the championship final.

At the end of the 2025 season, the team announced that they had declined Fagúndez's contract option, but were in negotiations to re-sign him to a new contract for the next season, however the contract did not materialize before his contract expired.

=== Return to the New England Revolution ===
On March 13, 2026, the New England Revolution announced that they had re-signed Fagúndez to a one-year contract until the end of the 2026 MLS season, with a club option to extend for a further year. Fagúndez made his first appearance for club on March 15, 2026, vs. Cincinnati FC. He recorded his 80th assist one minute after being subbed in. He made his 262nd appearance for the Revolution on March 15, 2026, surpassing Shalrie Joseph for 2nd-most all-time.

On April 14, 2026, Fagúndez scored his first goal since returning to the Revolution in a U.S. Open Cup round of 32 victory over Rhode Island FC.

== International career ==
Fagúndez is a former Uruguay youth international. He made his debut for Uruguay U20 team in October 2012. He played two games for Uruguay U20 against Peru in that month. In the first he entered as a substitute in the 83rd minute; in the second fixture he was brought on in the 45th minute.

In April 2013, he stated that he would be willing to represent either Uruguay or the United States at the 2013 FIFA U-20 World Cup. However, he was not called up by Uruguay and was not eligible for represent U.S. at the time due to not having citizenship.

In August 2014, he was called up again for the Uruguay U20 national team and played in two games against Peru, a 1–0 win victory and a 1–1 draw.

In January 2015, Fagúndez was called up for the 2015 South American Youth Championship. He played in Uruguay's 1–0 victory over Colombia.

== Personal life ==
Diego's father, Washington Fagúndez, was a professional footballer in Uruguay who played as a goalkeeper with Central Español in the 1990s. Diego is the godson of former Uruguayan international footballer and 1995 Copa América winner Diego Dorta, after whom he is named.

Fagúndez is married to his wife Paige and they have three children together. During his first stint with the Revolution he described himself as "a soccer player in the morning and a farmer in the afternoon." This was due to him having multiple animals in his house including 7 dogs, along with multiple rabbits, turtles, iguanas, fish and chickens.

Fagúndez received his U.S. green card in October 2013, which qualifies him as a domestic player for MLS roster purposes. On 13 March 2024, Fagúndez announced he had become a U.S. citizen on social media.

== Career statistics ==
As of match played 7 November 2026

Appearances and goals by club, season and competition
Club	Season	League			Playoffs		U.S. Open Cup		CONCACAF		Other		Total	
Club	Season	Division	Apps	Goals	Apps	Goals	Apps	Goals	Apps	Goals	Apps	Goals	Apps	Goals
New England Revolution	2011	MLS	6	2	—		0	0	—		—		6	2
New England Revolution	2012	MLS	20	2	—		1	0	—		—		21	2
New England Revolution	2013	MLS	31	13	2	0	1	0	—		—		34	13
New England Revolution	2014	MLS	31	5	0	0	2	0	—		—		33	5
New England Revolution	2015	MLS	30	6	1	0	1	0	—		—		32	6
New England Revolution	2016	MLS	34	6	—		5	0	—		—		39	6
New England Revolution	2017	MLS	32	7	—		3	1	—		—		35	8
New England Revolution	2018	MLS	33	9	—		0	0	—		—		33	9
New England Revolution	2019	MLS	25	2	1	0	2	0	—		—		28	2
New England Revolution	2020	MLS	19 (Note: Includes two appearances in MLS is Back Tournament group stage)	1	0	0	—		—		0	0	19	1
New England Revolution	Total		261	53	5	0	15	1	—		2	0	281	54
Austin FC	2021	MLS	33	7	—		—		—		—		33	7
Austin FC	2022	MLS	34	6	3	0	1	1	—		—		38	7
Austin FC	2023	MLS	19	2	0	0	1	0	2	0	2 (Note: Appearances in Leagues Cup)	1	24	3
Austin FC	Total		86	15	3	0	2	1	2	0	2	1	95	17
LA Galaxy	2023	MLS	11	1	—		—		—		—		11	1
LA Galaxy	2024	MLS	34	4	5	0	—		—		3	1	42	5
LA Galaxy	2025	MLS	32	6	—		—		4	0	7 (Note: Six appearances in Leagues Cup, one appearance and one goal in Campeones Cup)	1	43	7
LA Galaxy	Total		77	11	5	0	—		4	0	10	2	96	13
New England Revolution	2026	MLS	19	0	0	0	2	1	—		—		21	1
Career total			443	79	13	0	19	3	6	0	14	3	495	85

== Honours ==
LA Galaxy

- MLS Cup: 2024

Individual

- New England Revolution Team MVP (2013)
- Midnight Riders Man of the Year: 2017
- New England Revolution All-Time Team
