= Sebastián Driussi =

Argentine footballer (born 1996)

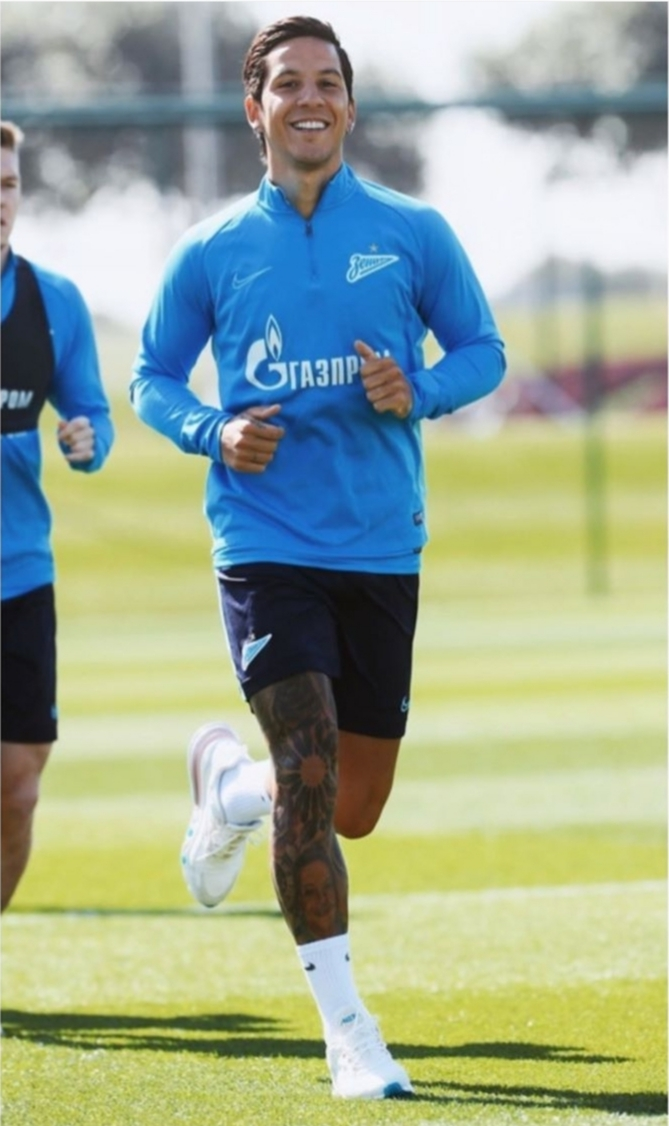
- Driussi with Zenit Saint Petersburg in 2020

Personal information
- Full name: Sebastián Driussi
- Date of birth: 9 February 1996 (age 30)
- Place of birth: San Justo, Argentina
- Height: 1.80 m (5 ft 11 in)
- Positions: Attacking midfielder; forward

Team information
- Current team: River Plate
- Number: 9

Youth career
- 2007–2013: River Plate

Senior career*
Years	Team	Apps	(Gls)
2013–2017	River Plate	67	(40)
2017–2021	Zenit Saint Petersburg	95	(29)
2021–2025	Austin FC	106	(49)
2025–	River Plate	41	(11)

International career^{‡}
2013–2014	Argentina U17	15	(7)
2015	Argentina U20	8	(1)
Medal record
Argentina U20
First place	South American U-20 Championship	2015
- * Club domestic league appearances and goals as of 21:00, 7 September 2026 (UTC) ‡ National team caps and goals as of 12 April 2015

Sebastián Driussi (Spanish pronunciation: [seβasˈtjan ˈdɾjusi]; born 9 February 1996) is an Argentine professional footballer who plays as a forward or attacking midfielder for Argentine Primera Division club River Plate.

== Club career ==
=== River Plate ===
On 2 December 2013, Driussi made his debut for River Plate as a starter in an Argentine Primera División match against Argentinos Juniors, playing 73 minutes in a 1–0 victory. His first league goal for the club came over a year later, as he scored in a 2–2 draw against Unión de Santa Fé on 8 March 2015.

=== Zenit Saint Petersburg ===
On 8 July 2017, Driussi joined Russian side Zenit Saint Petersburg on a four-year deal. The transfer fee was €15 million. He scored his first goal for Zenit on 22 July 2017 in a brace against FC Rubin Kazan.

His second goal came in the same game at stoppage time from a cross by teammate Domenico Criscito which helped them win their second fixture of the season under Roberto Mancini.

On 4 May 2019, he scored a late equalizer in an away game against FC Akhmat Grozny that secured the 2018–19 Russian Premier League championship for Zenit. On 26 July 2021, Driussi bought out the remaining year of his contract with Zenit St.Petersburg, and left the club.

=== Austin FC ===
Driussi signed with Major League Soccer club Austin FC on 29 July 2021 as a designated player. He made his debut on 7 August 2021 against FC Dallas, coming on as a 62nd-minute substitute in the 2–0 defeat.

Driussi scored his first goal for the club on 21 August 2021 in a 3–1 home victory against the Portland Timbers.

On 16 April 2022, Driussi became the first Austin FC player to score 10 goals for the club in a comeback road win at D.C. United.

Driussi was one of 26 players to make the 2022 MLS All-Star team. On 14 February 2023, Driussi signed a three-year contract with Austin FC through the 2025 season, with an option for the 2026 season.

=== Return to River Plate ===
On 17 January 2025, Driussi returned to his former club River Plate in a deal worth nearly $10 million.

== Career statistics ==
As of match played 19 October 2024

Appearances and goals by club, season and competition
Club	Season	League			National cup (Note: Includes Copa Argentina, Russian Cup, and U.S. Open Cup)		Continental		Other		Total	
Club	Season	Division	Apps	Goals	Apps	Goals	Apps	Goals	Apps	Goals	Apps	Goals
River Plate	2013–14	Argentine Primera División	2	0	3	0	—		—		5	0
River Plate	2014	Argentine Primera División	10	0	0	0	5 (Note: Appearances in Copa Sudamericana)	1	—		15	1
River Plate	2015	Argentine Primera División	18	4	0	0	7 (Note: Four appearances in Copa Libertadores, three appearances in Copa Sudamericana)	0	4 (Note: One appearance in Supercopa Argentina, one appearance in Suruga Bank Championship, one appearance in Supercopa Euroamericana, one appearance in FIFA Club World Cup)	0	27	4
River Plate	2016	Argentine Primera División	8	0	6	2	4 (Note: Appearances in Copa Libertadores)	0	2 (Note: Appearances in Recopa Sudamericana)	1	20	3
River Plate	2016–17	Argentine Primera División	29	17	0	0	6	3	1 (Note: Appearance in Supercopa Argentina)	0	36	20
River Plate	Total		67	21	9	2	22	4	7	1	105	28
Zenit Saint Petersburg	2017–18	Russian Premier League	27	5	1	0	12 (Note: Appearances in UEFA Europa League)	1	—		40	6
Zenit Saint Petersburg	2018–19	Russian Premier League	27	11	1	1	14	1	—		42	13
Zenit Saint Petersburg	2019–20	Russian Premier League	25	4	2	0	5 (Note: Appearances in UEFA Champions League)	0	1 (Note: Appearance in Russian Super Cup)	0	33	4
Zenit Saint Petersburg	2020–21	Russian Premier League	16	1	0	0	5	1	1	0	22	2
Zenit Saint Petersburg	2021–22	Russian Premier League	0	0	0	0	0	0	1	0	1	0
Zenit Saint Petersburg	Total		95	21	4	1	36	3	3	0	138	25
Austin FC	2021	MLS	17	5	—		—		—		17	5
Austin FC	2022	MLS	34	22	1	0	—		3 (Note: Appearances in MLS Cup playoffs)	3	38	25
Austin FC	2023	MLS	28	11	0	0	1 (Note: Appearance in CONCACAF Champions League)	2	1 (Note: Appearance(s) in Leagues Cup)	0	30	13
Austin FC	2024	MLS	27	7	—		—		3	1	30	8
Austin FC	Total		106	45	1	0	1	2	7	4	115	51
Career total			268	87	14	3	59	9	17	8	358	107

== Honours ==
River Plate

- Argentina Primera Division: 2014 Final
- Copa Argentina: 2015–16
- Copa Libertadores: 2015
- Copa Sudamericana: 2014
- Recopa Sudamericana: 2016
- Suruga Bank Championship: 2015
- FIFA Club World Cup runner-up: 2015

Zenit Saint Petersburg

- Russian Premier League: 2018–19, 2019–20, 2020–21
- Russian Cup: 2019–20
- Russian Super Cup: 2020, 2021

Argentina U17

- South American U-17 Championship: 2013

Argentina U20

- South American Youth Football Championship: 2015

Individual

- MLS All-Star: 2022
- MLS Player of the Month: April 2022, July 2022
- MLS Best XI: 2022
