= 2021 Austin FC season =

Austin FC
2021 season
- Chairman: Anthony Precourt
- Head coach: Josh Wolff
- Stadium: Q2 Stadium
- MLS: 12th Western Conference, 24th MLS
- U.S. Open Cup: Canceled
- Top goalscorer: League: Cecilio Domínguez; Diego Fagúndez (7 each); All: Cecilio Domínguez; Diego Fagúndez (7 each)
- Average home league attendance: 20,738
- Biggest win: ATX 4–1 POR (7/1)
- Biggest defeat: SJ 4–0 ATX (10/20)
Home colors	Away colors

The 2021 Austin FC season was the club's inaugural season in Major League Soccer, the top flight of soccer in the United States. This was also the first season a top-tier sports franchise is playing in the Greater Austin region.

With MLS experiencing close to $1 billion in loses for the 2020 season and another expected $1 billion loses in 2021 season related to COVID-19 restrictions, the MLS and MLSPA CBA talks pushed two weeks later then planned. This delayed the start of the 2021 season to April 17, 2021, about a month and a half later than normal, and concluded on November 7, 2021. Outside of MLS, Austin FC would have competed in the 2021 U.S. Open Cup, but that competition was postponed indefinitely in April before being canceled in July.

Austin FC won their first match on April 24, 2021 in Commerce City, CO against the Colorado Rapids 3-1, where midfielder Diego Fagundez scored the club's first ever goal. They played their first game in Austin on June 19, 2021 in front of 20,738 fans, a 0-0 draw against the San Jose Earthquakes. Austin won their first home game against the Portland Timbers 4-1 on July 1, 2021, a match which Austin FC winger Jon Gallagher scored the first ever MLS goal at Q2 Stadium.

Austin FC struggled in their inaugural campaign despite selling out all their home games. They finished 12th in the Western Conference with 9 wins, 4 draws, and 21 losses. Alexander Ring served as captain, and both Cecilio Dominguez and Diego Fagundez led the club with 7 goals.

== Preseason ==
Austin FC started their first season by building their roster with their first ever signing, Rodney Redes, on July 6, 2020. The club continued to build their squad by signing their first Designated Player, Cecilio Dominguez, on August 24, 2020. Austin FC continued to build on Dec 13, 2020 by trading for five more players using General Allocation Money. On Dec 15, 2020, the club obtained five more players through the 2021 MLS Expansion Draft. By the end of the year, Austin FC added five more players to the roster. Austin FC started 2021 by adding seven more players to the team, including its second Designated Player, Tomás Pochettino. On April 16, 2021, the day before the club's first competitive game they added two more players to round out the roster.

== Season ==
=== 8 Games on the Road - April / May / June ===
Due to Q2 Stadium not being finished, Austin FC played their first 8 matches in club history on the road. They lost their first match 2-0 against LAFC, but rallied to win their next 2 matches against the Colorado Rapids and Minnesota United FC 3-1 and 1-0 respectively. Midfielder Diego Fagundez scored the club's first goal in the 59th minute in Colorado, a match where Cecilio Dominguez notched the first brace in club history. After the quick start, Austin had an 8 game winless, streak, only earning 4 points during this period, all from draws.

=== First games in Austin - June / July ===
Austin played their first home match on June 19, a 0-0 draw against the San Jose Earthquakes in front of a sellout crowd of 20,738. After a quick 2-0 loss in Minnesota, the club was home for their next 6 matches. After over a 200 minute home scoring drought, Jon Gallagher scored the first ever goal in Q2 Stadium in Austin's first home win, a 4-1 drubbing of the eventual Western Conference champion Portland Timbers. After losing 3 consecutive home games, they won their first ever Copa Tejas competition, a 3-2 win against the Dynamo where Tomás Pochettino scored his first MLS brace.

Austin FC also played their first ever international friendly, a 3-1 loss in Austin against Liga MX side Tigres UANL on July 13.

=== Reinforcements and Further Struggles - August / September ===
Through the club's first 16 games, Austin only scored 13 goals. To kickstart their offense, they paid $1.65 million to sign Moussa Djitte from Grenoble and $7 million to sign Argentinian forward Sebastian Driussi from Zenit Saint Petersburg of the Russian Premier League. Driussi made his debut August 7 and scored his first goal in a 3-1 win against Portland on August 21. Despite nearly doubling their offensive output scoring 12 goals over a 7 game stretch, Austin had 1 win and 8 losses over 9 matches from August 7 to September 18 following Driussi's debut.

=== End of the Inaugural Season - October ===
While only having 19 points through 25 matches, Austin FC was still technically in the playoff race come October. On September 26, homegrown player McKinze Gaines became the first Austinite to score a goal for the club in a 2-0 upset win against the LA Galaxy. Even though they won 4 of their last 5 home matches, their lone loss against Minnesota eliminated them from postseason play on October 16. Despite the loss, Austin FC still had 2 more Copa Tejas matches. They defeated the Dynamo 2-1 on October 24 and could have secured the Cup with a win in Frisco against FC Dallas. However, they lost the contest 2-1, conceding the Cup winning goal to Franco Jara in the 80th minute. Austin won their last home game of the season against Sporting Kansas City where Sebastian Driussi scored 30 seconds into the match, the fastest goal in the club's short history. Austin FC ended their inaugural season on November 7, a 3-0 loss to the Timbers in Portland.

Diego Fagundez tied for the team lead in both goals with Cecilio Dominguez (7) and assists with Sebastian Driussi (5). He was selected as the team's offensive player of the year, while GK Brad Stuver was selected as the team's defensive player of the year, respectively. Stuver led the MLS with 134 saves in 2021.

== Management team ==
Position	Name
Chairman	(United States) Anthony Precourt
Sporting director	(United States) Claudio Reyna
Head coach	(United States) Josh Wolff
Assistant coach	(United States) Davy Arnaud

== Roster ==
As of November 7, 2021.

No.	Name	Nationality	Position(s)	Date of birth (age)	Signed in	Previous club	Apps	Goals
Goalkeepers
28	Brady Scott	(United States)	GK	July 30, 1999 (age 26)	2020	(United States) Nashville SC	0	0
31	Andrew Tarbell	(United States)	GK	October 7, 1993 (age 32)	2020	(United States) Columbus Crew SC	1	0
34	Will Pulisic	(United States)	GK	April 16, 1998 (age 27)	2021	(United States) Duke Blue Devils	0	0
41	Brad Stuver	(United States)	GK	April 16, 1991 (age 34)	2020	(United States) New York City FC	33	0
Defenders
3	Jhohan Romaña	(Colombia)	CB	September 13, 1998 (age 27)	2020	(Paraguay) Guaraní	25	0
4	Aedan Stanley	(United States)	LB	December 13, 1999 (age 26)	2021	(United States) Duke Blue Devils	9	0
5	Matt Besler	(United States)	CB	February 11, 1987 (age 39)	2021	(United States) Sporting Kansas City	20	0
16	Hector Jiménez	(United States)	LB	November 3, 1988 (age 37)	2020	(United States) Columbus Crew SC	25	1
18	Julio Cascante	(Costa Rica)	CB	October 3, 1993 (age 32)	2020	(United States) Portland Timbers	31	2
19	Freddy Kleemann	(United States)	CB	January 1, 1999 (age 27)	2021	(United States) Washington Huskies	3	0
21	Žan Kolmanič	(Slovenia)	LB	March 3, 2000 (age 26)	2021	(Slovenia) Maribor	30	0
22	Ben Sweat	(United States)	LB	September 4, 1991 (age 34)	2020	(United States) Inter Miami CF	2	0
24	Nick Lima	(United States)	CB	November 17, 1994 (age 31)	2020	(United States) San Jose Earthquakes	28	0
Midfielders
2	Emanual Perez	(United States)	CM	February 19, 1999 (age 27)	2021	(United States) Portland Timbers	10	0
6	Sebastian Berhalter	(United States)	CM	May 10, 2001 (age 24)	2021	(United States) Columbus Crew SC	18	0
7	Tomás Pochettino (DP)	(Argentina)	CM	February 1, 1996 (age 30)	2021	(Argentina) Talleres	31	2
8	Alexander Ring (captain)	(Finland)	CM	April 9, 1991 (age 34)	2020	(United States) New York City FC	31	4
10	Cecilio Domínguez (DP)	(Paraguay)	MF	August 11, 1994 (age 31)	2020	(Argentina) Independiente	34	7
12	Ulises Segura	(Costa Rica)	LM	June 23, 1993 (age 32)	2020	(United States) D.C. United	0	0
14	Diego Fagúndez	(Uruguay)	CAM	February 14, 1995 (age 31)	2021	(United States) New England Revolution	33	7
15	Daniel Pereira (GA)	(Venezuela)	CAM	July 14, 2000 (age 25)	2021	(United States) Virginia Tech Hokies	25	0
20	Jared Stroud	(United States)	MF	July 10, 1996 (age 29)	2020	(United States) New York Red Bulls	22	1
33	Owen Wolff (HG)	(United States)	RM	December 30, 2004 (age 21)	2020	(United States) Austin FC Academy	2	0
Forward
9	Danny Hoesen	(Netherlands)	FW	January 15, 1991 (age 35)	2020	(United States) San Jose Earthquakes	5	0
11	Rodney Redes	(Paraguay)	FW	February 22, 2000 (age 26)	2020	(Paraguay) Guaraní	25	0
13	Aaron Schoenfeld	(United States)	FW	April 17, 1990 (age 35)	2021	(United States) Minnesota United FC	0	0
17	Jon Gallagher	(Republic of Ireland)	FW	February 23, 1996 (age 30)	2020	(United States) Atlanta United FC	27	3
23	Kekuta Manneh	(The Gambia)	FW	December 30, 1994 (age 31)	2021	(United States) New England Revolution	16	0
25	Sebastián Driussi (DP)	(Argentina)	FW	February 9, 1996 (age 30)	2021	(Russia) Zenit Saint Petersburg	17	5
27	McKinze Gaines	(United States)	FW	March 2, 1998 (age 28)	2021	(Germany) Hanover 96	9	1
99	Moussa Djitté (U22) (Note: https://www.mlssoccer.com/news/mls-launches-u22-initiative-to-support-further-investment-in-young-players)	(Senegal)	FW	October 4, 1999 (age 26)	2021	(France) Grenoble	13	1

== Transfers ==
=== In ===
Date	Position	No.	Name	From	Fee	Ref.
July 6, 2020	FW	11	(Paraguay) Rodney Redes	(Paraguay) Guaraní	$2,750,000	
August 24, 2020	MF	10	(Paraguay) Cecilio Domínguez	(Argentina) Independiente	$2,500,000	
December 13, 2020	DF	18	(Costa Rica) Julio Cascante	(United States) Portland Timbers	$250,000 GAM	
December 13, 2020	DF	17	(Republic of Ireland) Jon Gallagher	(United States) Atlanta United FC	$225,000 GAM	
December 13, 2020	DF	24	(United States) Nick Lima	(United States) San Jose Earthquakes	$250,000 GAM	
December 13, 2020	MF	12	(Costa Rica) Ulises Segura	(United States) D.C. United	$150,000 GAM	
December 13, 2020	DF	22	(United States) Ben Sweat	(United States) Inter Miami CF	$100,000 GAM	
December 15, 2020	FW	9	(Netherlands) Danny Hoesen	(United States) San Jose Earthquakes	Drafted (Note: Selected in the MLS Expansion Draft.)	
December 15, 2020	MF	20	(United States) Jared Stroud	(United States) Red Bull New York	Drafted	
December 15, 2020	GK	28	(United States) Brady Scott	(United States) Nashville SC	Drafted	
December 15, 2020	MF	—	(United States) Joe Corona	(United States) LA Galaxy	Drafted	
December 15, 2020	DF	—	(Canada) Kamal Miller	(United States) Orlando City SC	Drafted	
December 17, 2020	MF	8	(Finland) Alexander Ring	(United States) New York City FC	$1,250,000 GAM	
December 21, 2020	DF	16	(United States) Hector Jiménez	(United States) Columbus Crew	Free	
December 22, 2020	DF	3	(Colombia) Jhohan Romaña	(Paraguay) Guaraní	Undisclosed	
December 23, 2020	GK	31	(United States) Andrew Tarbell	(United States) Columbus Crew	Free	
December 28, 2020	GK	41	(United States) Brad Stuver	(United States) New York City FC	Free	
January 5, 2021	MF	14	(Uruguay) Diego Fagúndez	(United States) New England Revolution	Free	
January 6, 2021	DF	5	(United States) Matt Besler	(United States) Sporting Kansas City	Free	
January 21, 2021	MF	15	(Venezuela) Daniel Pereira	(United States) Virginia Tech Hokies	Drafted (Note: Selected in the MLS SuperDraft.)	
January 22, 2021	FW	23	(The Gambia) Kekuta Manneh	(United States) New England Revolution	Free	
February 4, 2021	FW	13	(United States) Aaron Schoenfeld	(United States) Minnesota United FC	Free	
February 9, 2021	DF	19	(United States) Freddy Kleemann	(United States) Washington Huskies	Drafted	
February 11, 2021	MF	7	(Argentina) Tomás Pochettino	(Argentina) Talleres	$2,500,000	
April 16, 2021	GK	34	(United States) Will Pulisic	(United States) North Carolina FC U23	Free	
April 16, 2021	DF	4	(United States) Aedan Stanley	(United States) Sporting Kansas City II	Drafted	
June 30, 2021	FW	99	(Senegal) Moussa Djitté	(France) Grenoble Foot 38	$1,650,000	
July 29, 2021	MF	25	(Argentina) Sebastián Driussi	(Russia) Zenit Saint Petersburg	$7,000,000	
September 9, 2021	MF	33	(United States) Owen Wolff	(United States) Austin FC Academy	Homegrown	

=== Loan In ===
No.	Pos.	Player	Loaned from	Start	End	Source
21	DF	(Slovenia) Žan Kolmanič	(Slovenia) NK Maribor	March 3, 2021	December 31, 2021	
6	MF	(United States) Sebastian Berhalter	(United States) Columbus Crew SC	March 3, 2021	December 31, 2021	
2	MF	(United States) Emanuel Perez	(United States) Portland Timbers	April 26, 2021	December 31, 2021	

=== Out ===
Date	Position	No.	Name	To	Fee	Ref.
December 15, 2020	—	—	(Canada) Kamal Miller	(Canada) Montreal Impact	$225,000 GAM	
December 22, 2020	–	–	(United States) Joe Corona	(United States) Houston Dynamo FC	Drafted (Note: Selected in the 2020 MLS Re-Entry Draft.)	
November 10, 2021	DF	5	(United States) Matt Besler		Retired	

=== Loan out ===
No.	Pos.	Player	Loaned to	Start	End	Source
—	FW	(Paraguay) Rodney Redes	(Paraguay) Guaraní	July 6, 2020	December 31, 2020	
—	MF	(Paraguay) Cecilio Domínguez	(Paraguay) Guaraní	September 1, 2020	December 31, 2020	
—	DF	(United States) Freddy Kleemann	(United States) Birmingham Legion	May 14, 2021	May 30, 2021	
—	GK	(United States) Brady Scott	(United States) Memphis 901 FC	May 14, 2021	End of season	

=== MLS SuperDraft picks ===
2021 Austin FC SuperDraft Picks
Round	Selection	Player	Position	College	Notes
1	1	(Venezuela) Daniel Pereira	MF	Virginia Tech	
1	11	(United States) Freddy Kleemann	DF	Washington	Received pick from CF Montréal
1	21	(United States) Aedan Stanley	DF	Duke	Received pick from FC Dallas via Colorado Rapids; Signed with Sporting Kansas City II
2	28	(Scotland) Daniel Steedman	FW	Virginia	Signed with North Carolina FC
3	55	(United States) Noah Lawrence	GK	Ohio State	

== Non-competitive fixtures ==
=== Preseason ===
March 19 Exhibition	Austin FC	5–1	OKC Energy	Austin, Texas
11AM CST	Argudo 43'; Manneh 54'; Redes; Hoesen (o.g.)	Report	López 20'	Stadium: Lewis–Chen Family Field; Attendance: 0

March 25 Exhibition	Austin FC	2–0	Louisville City	Austin, Texas
11AM CST	Hoesen,			Stadium: Lewis–Chen Family Field; Attendance: 0

April 3 La Copita	Austin FC	2–3	Houston Dynamo FC	Austin, Texas
4PM CST	Pochettino 16'; Redes 66'	ATX Report; HOU Report	Picault 54', 71'; Urruti 56' (Vera)	Stadium: St. David's Performance Center; Attendance: 0

April 3 Scrimmage	Austin FC	0–1	Houston Dynamo FC	Austin, Texas
6PM CST		Report	Rodríguez	Stadium: St. David's Performance Center; Attendance: 0
Note: 30-minute scrimmage.

April 7 La Copita	FC Dallas	3–3 (4–2 p)	Austin FC	Frisco, Texas
4PM CST	Freddy Vargas 11'; Matt Hedges 34'; Jesús Ferreira 86' (Freddy Vargas)	ATX Report; DAL Report	Jared Stroud 50' (Aedan Stanley); Diego Fagúndez 54' (pen.); Cecilio Domínguez 73' (pen.)	Stadium: Toyota Stadium

April 10 La Copita	Austin FC	5–1	San Antonio FC	Austin, Texas
4PM CST	Domínguez 3' (Pereira), 44' (Pereira); Hoesen 14' (Sweat); Pochettino 35'; Ring 54' (pen.)	Report	Patiño 39'	Stadium: St. David's Performance Center; Attendance: 0

April 11 Scrimmage	Austin FC	3–2	Rio Grande Valley FC Toros	Austin, Texas
CST				Stadium: St. David's Performance Center

=== Midseason ===
July 13 International Friendly	Austin FC	1–3	Tigres UANL	Austin, Texas
8PM CST	Rodney Redes 62'	Report	Diego Reyes 26'; Nicolas Lopez 71'; Nicolas Lopez 73'	Stadium: Q2 Stadium

== Competitive fixtures ==
=== Major League Soccer regular season ===
==== Standings ====
===== Western Conference =====
Pos	Team	Pld	W	L	T	GF	GA	GD	Pts
9	Los Angeles FC	34	12	13	9	53	51	+2	45
10	San Jose Earthquakes	34	10	13	11	46	54	−8	41
11	FC Dallas	34	7	15	12	47	56	−9	33
12	Austin FC	34	9	21	4	35	56	−21	31
13	Houston Dynamo FC	34	6	16	12	36	54	−18	30

Source: MLS
Rules for classification: 1) points; 2) total wins; 3) total goal differential; 4) total goals scored; 5) fewer disciplinary points; 6) away goal differential; 7) away goals scored; 8) home goals differential; 9) home goals scored; 10) coin toss (2 clubs tied) or drawing of lots (≥3 clubs tied)

===== Overall =====
Pos	Team	Pld	W	L	T	GF	GA	GD	Pts
22	Chicago Fire FC	34	9	18	7	36	54	−18	34
23	FC Dallas	34	7	15	12	47	56	−9	33
24	Austin FC	34	9	21	4	35	56	−21	31
25	Houston Dynamo FC	34	6	16	12	36	54	−18	30
26	Toronto FC	34	6	18	10	39	66	−27	28

Source: MLS
Rules for classification: 1) points; 2) total wins; 3) total goal differential; 4) total goals scored; 5) fewer disciplinary points; 6) away goal differential; 7) away goals scored; 8) home goals differential; 9) home goals scored; 10) coin toss (2 clubs tied) or drawing of lots (≥3 clubs tied)

==== Matches ====
April 17, 2021 1	Los Angeles FC	2–0	Austin FC	Los Angeles, California
5:00 PM CT	Baird 61'; Cifuentes 90+1'	Report		Stadium: Banc of California Stadium; Attendance: 4,900; Referee: Alex Chilowicz

April 24, 2021 2	Colorado Rapids	1–3	Austin FC	Commerce City, Colorado
8:00 PM CT	Shinyashiki 36', (yellow card) 40'; Price (yellow card) 47'	Report	Fagundez 59'; Domínguez 67', 71'; Pereira (yellow card) 73'	Stadium: Dick's Sporting Goods Park; Referee: Marcos de Oliviera

May 1, 2021 3	Minnesota United FC	0–1	Austin FC	Saint Paul, Minnesota
7:00 PM CT	Alonso (yellow card) 41'; Boxall (yellow card) 60'; Gasper (yellow card) 90+6'	Report	Fagúndez 17'; Romaña (yellow card) 74'; Berhalter (yellow card) 81'	Stadium: Allianz Field; Attendance: 4,100; Referee: Ramy Touchan

May 9, 2021 4	Sporting Kansas City	2–1	Austin FC	Kansas City, Kansas
6:30 PM CT	Sánchez (yellow card) 56' (goal) 82'; Martins (yellow card) 59'; Kinda 90'		Gallagher 7'; Romaña (yellow card) 42'; Ring (yellow card) 45' (yellow-red card) 67'; Jiménez (yellow card) 87'	Stadium: Children's Mercy Park; Referee: Ted Unkel

May 15, 2021 5	LA Galaxy	2–0	Austin FC	Carson, California
2:30 PM CT	Lletget 35'; Hernández 77'	Report		Stadium: Dignity Health Sports Park; Attendance: 7,193; Referee: Kevin Stott

May 23, 2021 6	Nashville SC	1–0	Austin FC	Nashville, Tennessee
8:00 PM CT	Leal 35'	Report	Pereira (yellow card) 69'	Stadium: Nissan Stadium; Attendance: 22,421; Referee: Chris Penso

May 30, 2021 7	Seattle Sounders FC	0–0	Austin FC	Seattle, Washington
8:00 PM CT	Arreaga (yellow card) 2'	Report	Lima (yellow card) 24'; Stroud (yellow card) 45+2'	Stadium: Lumen Field; Attendance: 12,895; Referee: Rosendo Mendoza

June 12, 2021 8	Sporting Kansas City	1–1	Austin FC	Kansas City, Kansas
8:30 PM CT	Walter (yellow card) 32'; Salloi 71'	Report	Dominguez 26'; Besler (yellow card) 79'; Lima (yellow card) 90'	Stadium: Children's Mercy Park; Referee: Robert Sibiga

June 19, 2021 9	Austin FC	0–0	San Jose Earthquakes	Austin, Texas
8:00 PM CT	Stroud (yellow card) 44'	Report	Jungwirth (yellow card) 15'; Remedi (yellow card) 25'	Stadium: Q2 Stadium; Referee: Ismail Elfath

June 23, 2021 10	Minnesota United FC	2–0	Austin FC	Saint Paul, Minnesota
7:00 PM CT	Fragapane 10'; Hunou 18'	Report	Romaña (yellow card) 16'; Fagúndez (yellow card) 39'	Stadium: Allianz Field; Attendance: 19,209; Referee: Silviu Petrescu

June 27, 2021 11	Austin FC	0–0	Columbus Crew	Austin, Texas
7:00 PM CT	Fagúndez (yellow card) 90+5'	Report	Afful (yellow card) 35'	Stadium: Q2 Stadium; Attendance: 20,738; Referee: Ted Unkel

July 1, 2021 12	Austin FC	4–1	Portland Timbers	Austin, Texas
8:00 PM CT	Gallagher 28'; Fagúndez 33'; Kolmanič (yellow card) 44'; Pochettino (yellow card) 45+1'; Ring 77'; Jiménez 81'	Report	Tuiloma (yellow card) 45+5'; Ebobisse 45+7'; Asprilla (yellow card) 68'; Župarić (yellow card) 90+1'	Stadium: Q2 Stadium; Attendance: 20,738; Referee: Ted Unkel

July 7, 2021 13	Austin FC	0–2	Los Angeles FC	Austin, Texas
8:00 PM CT	Pereira (yellow card) 3'; Cascante (yellow card) 36'; Kolmanič (yellow card) 45+2'	Report	Cifuentes 39'; Farfan (yellow card) 70'; Murillo (yellow card) 85'; Rossi 89'	Stadium: Q2 Stadium; Attendance: 20,738; Referee: Ramy Touchan

July 22, 2021 14	Austin FC	0–1	Seattle Sounders FC	Austin, Texas
8:30 PM CT	Jiménez (yellow card) 57'; Domínguez (yellow card) 85'	Report	Adeniran (yellow card) 34'; Ruidíaz 67', (yellow card) 90+4'	Stadium: Q2 Stadium; Attendance: 20,738; Referee: Alex Chilowicz

July 31, 2021 15	Austin FC	0–1	Colorado Rapids	Austin, Texas
8:00 PM CT	Fagúndez (yellow card) 25'; Stanley (yellow card) 90+5'	Report	Shinyashiki 29'	Stadium: Q2 Stadium; Attendance: 20,738

August 4, 2021 16 Copa Tejas	Austin FC	3–2	Houston Dynamo FC	Austin, Texas
8:00 PM CT	Pochettino 7', 15+1'; Domínguez 56'	Report	Cerén (red card) 20'; Pasher 27'; Picault 86'	Stadium: Q2 Stadium; Attendance: 20,738; Referee: Joseph Dickerson

August 7, 2021 17 Copa Tejas	FC Dallas	2–0	Austin FC	Frisco, Texas
7:30 PM CT	Bressan (yellow card) 42'; Hollingshead 50'; Ferreira 63'; Jara (yellow card) 90+4'	Report		Stadium: Toyota Stadium; Attendance: 16,625; Referee: Alan Kelly

August 14, 2021 18	Real Salt Lake	1–0	Austin FC	Sandy, Utah
9:00 PM CT	Wood 32'; Morgan (yellow card) 68'	Report	Ring (yellow card) 44'; Cascante (red card) 49'	Stadium: Rio Tinto Stadium; Attendance: 17,506; Referee: David Gantar

August 18, 2021 19	Austin FC	1–2	Vancouver Whitecaps FC	Austin, Texas
8:00 PM CT	Ring 37'; Jiménez (yellow card) 55'; Besler (yellow card) 63'	Report	Nerwinski 52'; Dájome (yellow card) 62'; White 74'	Stadium: Q2 Stadium; Attendance: 20,738; Referee: Rosendo Mendoza

August 21, 2021 20	Austin FC	3–1	Portland Timbers	Austin, Texas
8:00 PM CT	Domínguez 11' (pen.); Fagúndez 14'; Driussi 29'; Pochettino (yellow card) 83'	Report	Asprilla 55'; Župarić (yellow card) 64'	Stadium: Q2 Stadium; Attendance: 20,738; Referee: Guido Gonzales Jr.

August 29, 2021 21 Copa Tejas	Austin FC	3–5	FC Dallas	Austin, Texas
7:00 PM CT	Cascante 13'; Lima (yellow card) 25'; Fagúndez 59'; Ring 68'	Report	Ferreira 5', 38'; Schön (yellow card) 17'; Pepi 36', 40'; Obrian 53'; ElMedkhar (yellow card) 84'	Stadium: Q2 Stadium; Attendance: 20,738; Referee: Jair Marrufo

September 4, 2021 22	Vancouver Whitecaps FC	2–1	Austin FC	Vancouver, British Columbia
4:00 PM PDT	Godoy 70'; Caicedo 83', (yellow card) 84'	Report	Fagúndez (yellow card) 7'; Driussi 45'; Kleemann (yellow card) 79'	Stadium: BC Place; Attendance: 9,223; Referee: Pierre-Luc Lauziere

September 11, 2021 23 Copa Tejas	Houston Dynamo FC	3–0	Austin FC	Houston, Texas
7:30 PM CDT	Dorsey 1'; Picault 24', 64', (yellow card) 39'; Lundkvist (yellow card) 52'	Report	Pochettino (yellow card) 22'; Ring (yellow card) 44'; Berhalter (yellow card) 51'	Stadium: BBVA Stadium; Attendance: 14,070; Referee: Ismail Elfath

September 15, 2021 24	Austin FC	1–2	Los Angeles FC	Austin, Texas
8:00 PM CT	Stroud (yellow card) 35'; Cascante (yellow card) 64'; Fagúndez 67'	Report	Crisostomo (yellow card) 29'; Arango 59' (pen.); Musovski (yellow card) 79', (goal) 81'	Stadium: Q2 Stadium; Attendance: 20,738; Referee: Timothy Ford

September 18, 2021 25	Austin FC	3–4	San Jose Earthquakes	Austin, Texas
8:00 PM CT	Pereira (yellow card) 4'; Driussi 6'; Gallagher 35'; Ring 45', (yellow card) 58' (yellow-red card) 65'; Stuver (yellow card) 60'; Cascante (yellow card) 69'	Report	M. López 17'; Espinoza 49', (yellow card) 60'; J. López 58' (pen.), 63'; Marie (yellow card) 72'; Remedi (yellow card) 90+3'; Ríos 90+6'	Stadium: Q2 Stadium; Attendance: 20,738; Referee: Baldomero Toledo

September 26, 2021 26	Austin FC	2–0	LA Galaxy	Austin, Texas
8:30 PM CDT	Domínguez (yellow card) 48'; Djitté 64'; Gaines 79'; Driussi (yellow card) 84'	Report		Stadium: Q2 Stadium; Referee: Guido Gonzales, Jr.

September 29, 2021 27	Colorado Rapids	3–0	Austin FC	Commerce City, Colorado
7:30 PM CT	Lewis 45+2'; Mezquida 46'; Trusty 59'; Warner (yellow card) 81'	Report	Gaines (yellow card) 28'; Lima (yellow card) 44'; Stroud (yellow card) 70'; Domínguez (yellow card) 90+3'	Stadium: Dick's Sporting Goods Park; Attendance: 8,582; Referee: Michael Radchuk

October 2, 2021 28	Austin FC	2–1	Real Salt Lake	Austin, Texas
2:30 PM CT	Domínguez 17', 55'; Pereira (yellow card) 90+2'	Report	Kreilach 64'	Stadium: Q2 Stadium; Referee: Rosendo Mendoza

October 16, 2021 29	Austin FC	0–1	Minnesota United FC	Austin, Texas
8:00 PM CT	Cascante (yellow card) 42'	Report	Fragapane 16'; Reynoso (yellow card) 59'; Gasper (yellow card) 90+2'; Alonso (yellow card) 90+3'	Stadium: Q2 Stadium; Attendance: 20,738; Referee: Michael Radchuk

October 20, 2021 30	San Jose Earthquakes	4–0	Austin FC	San Jose, California
9:30 PM CT	Cardoso (yellow card) 25'; López 47'; Kikanovic 53'; Wondolowski 59'; M. López (yellow card) 81'; Fierro 85'	Report	Romaña (yellow card) 39'; Ring (yellow card) 45+1'	Stadium: PayPal Park; Attendance: 12,035; Referee: Ismir Pekmic

October 24, 2021 31 Copa Tejas	Austin FC	2–1	Houston Dynamo FC	Austin, Texas
3:00 PM CT	Marić 7' (o.g.); Pereira (yellow card) 38'; Driussi 45+4' (Ring), (yellow card) 47'; Kolmanič (yellow card) 54'	Report	Cerén (yellow card) 11'; Vera (yellow card) 74'; Cascante 90+2' (o.g.)	Stadium: Q2 Stadium; Attendance: 20,738; Referee: Timothy Ford

October 30, 2021 32 Copa Tejas	FC Dallas	2–1	Austin FC	Frisco, Texas
7:00 PM CT	Twumasi (yellow card) 23'; Ferreira 38'; Cerrillo (yellow card) 48'; Jara 80'	Report	Romaña (yellow card) 14'; Fagundez 36', (yellow card) 83'; Jimenez (red card) 58'; Stuver (yellow card) 72'	Stadium: Toyota Stadium; Attendance: 16,080; Referee: Silviu Petrescu

November 3, 2021 33	Austin FC	3–1	Sporting Kansas City	Austin, Texas
9:00 PM CT	Driussi 1'; Cascante 22'; Gallagher (yellow card) 50'; Stroud 60'	Report	Isimat-Mirin (yellow card) 21'; Russell 65'	Stadium: Q2 Stadium; Attendance: 20,738; Referee: Nima Saghafi

November 7, 2021 34	Portland Timbers	3–0	Austin FC	Portland, Oregon
5:00 PM CT	Paredes 17'; Niezgoda 45'; Blanco 53'	Report	Berhalter (yellow card) 47'	Stadium: Providence Park; Attendance: 23,127; Referee: Rosendo Mendoza

=== U.S. Open Cup ===
The first three games of the 2021 MLS season were originally going to serve as the qualification for MLS teams to the 2021 Lamar Hunt U.S. Open Cup. After these games were played, U.S. Soccer canceled the 2021 Lamar Hunt U.S. Open Cup due to COVID-19.

==== Qualification ====
April 17 1 (MLS 1)	Los Angeles FC (California)	2–0	(Texas) Austin FC	Los Angeles, California
5:00 p.m. CST	Baird 61'; Cifuentes 90+1'	Report		Stadium: Banc of California Stadium; Attendance: 4,900; Referee: Alex Chilowicz

April 24 2 (MLS 2)	Colorado Rapids	1–3	(Texas) Austin FC	Commerce City, Colorado
8:00 p.m. CST	Shinyashiki 36', (yellow card) 40'; Price (yellow card) 47'	Report	Fagundez 59'; Domínguez 67', 71'; Pereira (yellow card) 73'	Stadium: Dicks Sporting Goods Park; Referee: Marcos de Oliviera

May 1 3 (MLS 3)	Minnesota United FC	0–1	(Texas) Austin FC	St. Paul, Minnesota
7:00 p.m. CST	Alonso (yellow card) 41'; Boxall (yellow card) 60'; Gasper (yellow card) 90+6'	Report	Fagúndez 17'; Romaña (yellow card) 74'; Berhalter (yellow card) 81'	Stadium: Allianz Field; Attendance: 4,100; Referee: Ramy Touchan

== Statistics ==
=== Appearances and goals ===
Numbers after plus–sign (+) denote appearances as a substitute.

No.	Pos	Nat	Player	Total		MLS		MLS Cup		U.S. Open Cup	
No.	Pos	Nat	Player	Apps	Goals	Apps	Goals	Apps	Goals	Apps	Goals
2	MF	(United States) USA	Emanuel Perez	10	0	4+6	0	0+0	0	0+0	0
3	DF	(Colombia) COL	Jhohan Romaña	25	0	19+6	0	0+0	0	0+0	0
4	DF	(United States) USA	Aedan Stanley	9	0	2+7	0	0+0	0	0+0	0
5	DF	(United States) USA	Matt Besler	20	0	20+0	0	0+0	0	0+0	0
6	MF	(United States) USA	Sebastian Berhalter	18	0	5+13	0	0+0	0	0+0	0
7	MF	(Argentina) ARG	Tomás Pochettino	31	2	26+5	2	0+0	0	0+0	0
8	MF	(Finland) FIN	Alexander Ring	31	4	31+0	4	0+0	0	0+0	0
9	FW	(Netherlands) NED	Danny Hoesen	5	0	5+0	0	0+0	0	0+0	0
10	MF	(Paraguay) PAR	Cecilio Domínguez	34	7	29+5	7	0+0	0	0+0	0
11	FW	(Paraguay) PAR	Rodney Redes	25	0	5+20	0	0+0	0	0+0	0
12	MF	(Costa Rica) CRC	Ulises Segura	0	0	0+0	0	0+0	0	0+0	0
13	FW	(United States) USA	Aaron Schoenfeld	0	0	0+0	0	0+0	0	0+0	0
14	MF	(Uruguay) URU	Diego Fagúndez	33	7	30+3	7	0+0	0	0+0	0
15	MF	(Venezuela) VEN	Daniel Pereira	25	0	18+7	0	0+0	0	0+0	0
16	DF	(United States) USA	Hector Jiménez	25	1	19+6	1	0+0	0	0+0	0
17	FW	(Republic of Ireland) IRL	Jon Gallagher	27	3	13+14	3	0+0	0	0+0	0
18	DF	(Costa Rica) CRC	Julio Cascante	31	2	27+4	2	0+0	0	0+0	0
19	DF	(United States) USA	Freddy Kleemann	3	0	1+2	0	0+0	0	0+0	0
20	MF	(United States) USA	Jared Stroud	22	1	13+9	1	0+0	0	0+0	0
21	DF	(Slovenia) SVN	Žan Kolmanič	30	0	23+7	0	0+0	0	0+0	0
22	DF	(United States) USA	Ben Sweat	2	0	2+0	0	0+0	0	0+0	0
23	FW	(The Gambia) GAM	Kekuta Manneh	16	0	2+14	0	0+0	0	0+0	0
24	DF	(United States) USA	Nick Lima	28	0	21+7	0	0+0	0	0+0	0
25	FW	(Argentina) ARG	Sebastián Driussi	17	5	16+1	5	0+0	0	0+0	0
27	FW	(United States) USA	McKinze Gaines	9	1	1+8	1	0+0	0	0+0	0
28	GK	(United States) USA	Brady Scott	0	0	0+0	0	0+0	0	0+0	0
31	GK	(United States) USA	Andrew Tarbell	1	0	1+0	0	0+0	0	0+0	0
33	MF	(United States) USA	Owen Wolff	2	0	0+2	0	0+0	0	0+0	0
34	GK	(United States) USA	Will Pulisic	0	0	0+0	0	0+0	0	0+0	0
41	GK	(United States) USA	Brad Stuver	33	0	33+0	0	0+0	0	0+0	0
99	FW	(Senegal) SEN	Moussa Djitté	13	1	9+4	1	0+0	0	0+0	0

- Last updated: November 7, 2021
- Source: https://www.austinfc.com/stats/

=== Top scorers ===
Rank	Position	Number	Name	MLS	MLS Cup	Total
1	MF	14	(Uruguay) Diego Fagúndez	7	0	7
1	FW	10	(Paraguay) Cecilio Domínguez	7	0	7
3	FW	25	(Argentina) Sebastián Driussi	5	0	5
4	MF	8	(Finland) Alexander Ring	4	0	4
5	FW	17	(Republic of Ireland) Jon Gallagher	3	0	3
6	MF	7	(Argentina) Tomás Pochettino	2	0	2
6	DF	18	(Costa Rica) Julio Cascante	2	0	2
8	DF	16	(United States) Hector Jiménez	1	0	1
8	FW	18	(Senegal) Moussa Djitté	1	0	1
8	FW	18	(United States) McKinze Gaines	1	0	1
8	FW	20	(United States) Jared Stroud	1	0	1
Total				34	0	34

- Last updated: November 7, 2021
- Source: https://www.austinfc.com/stats/

=== Top assists ===
Rank	Position	Number	Name	MLS	MLS Cup	U.S. Open Cup	Total
1	FW	25	(Argentina) Sebastian Driussi	5	0	0	5
1	MF	14	(Uruguay) Diego Fagundez	5	0	0	5
3	MF	10	(Paraguay) Cecilio Domínguez	4	0	0	4
3	DF	11	(Slovenia) Žan Kolmanič	4	0	0	4
3	MF	20	(United States) Jared Stroud	4	0	0	4
6	DF	24	(United States) Nick Lima	3	0	0	3
7	DF	18	(Costa Rica) Julio Cascante	2	0	0	2
7	MF	16	(United States) Hector Jimenez	2	0	0	2
7	MF	7	(Argentina) Tomás Pochettino	2	0	0	2
7	MF	8	(Finland) Alexander Ring	2	0	0	2
11	MF	6	(United States) Sebastian Berhalter	1	0	0	2
11	FW	17	(Republic of Ireland) Jon Gallagher	1	0	0	1
11	FW	9	(Netherlands) Danny Hoesen	1	0	0	1
11	MF	15	(Venezuela) Daniel Pereira	1	0	0	1
11	FW	11	(Paraguay) Rodney Redes	1	0	0	1
Total				37	0	0	37

- Last updated: November 7, 2021
- Source: https://www.austinfc.com/stats/

=== Disciplinary record ===
No.	Pos.	Player	MLS			MLS Cup			U.S. Open Cup			Total		
No.	Pos.	Player	Booked	(yellow card) (yellow-red card)	Sent off (straight red)	Booked	(yellow card) (yellow-red card)	Sent off (straight red)	Booked	(yellow card) (yellow-red card)	Sent off (straight red)	Booked	(yellow card) (yellow-red card)	Sent off (straight red)
15	MF	(Venezuela) Daniel Pereira	7	0	0	0	0	0	0	0	0	7	0	0
8	MF	(Finland) Alexander Ring	3	1	1	0	0	0	0	0	0	3	1	1
8	MF	(Uruguay) Diego Fagundez	5	0	0	0	0	0	0	0	0	5	0	0
3	DF	(Colombia) Jhohan Romaña	5	0	0	0	0	0	0	0	0	5	0	0
20	MF	(United States) Jared Stroud	5	0	0	0	0	0	0	0	0	5	0	0
18	DF	(Costa Rica) Julio Cascante	4	0	1	0	0	0	0	0	0	4	0	1
21	DF	(Slovenia) Žan Kolmanič	4	0	0	0	0	0	0	0	0	4	0	0
24	DF	(United States) Nick Lima	4	0	0	0	0	0	0	0	0	4	0	0
10	MF	(Paraguay) Cecilio Dominguez	3	0	0	0	0	0	0	0	0	3	0	0
7	MF	(Argentina) Tomás Pochettino	3	0	0	0	0	0	0	0	0	3	0	0
6	MF	(United States) Sebastian Berhalter	3	0	0	0	0	0	0	0	0	3	0	0
5	DF	(United States) Matt Besler	2	0	0	0	0	0	0	0	0	2	0	0
25	FW	(Argentina) Sebastián Driussi	2	0	0	0	0	0	0	0	0	2	0	0
16	MF	(United States) Hector Jiménez	2	0	1	0	0	0	0	0	0	2	0	1
41	GK	(United States) Brad Stuver	2	0	0	0	0	0	0	0	0	2	0	0
27	FW	(United States) McKinze Gaines	1	0	0	0	0	0	0	0	0	1	0	0
19	DF	(United States) Freddy Kleemann	1	0	0	0	0	0	0	0	0	1	0	0
4	DF	(United States) Aedan Stanley	1	0	0	0	0	0	0	0	0	1	0	0
21	DF	(Republic of Ireland) Jon Gallagher	1	0	0	0	0	0	0	0	0	1	0	0
Total			58	1	3	0	0	0	0	0	0	58	1	3

- Last updated: November 7, 2021
- Source: https://www.austinfc.com/stats/

=== Clean sheets ===
Rank	Number	Name	MLS	Playoffs	U.S. Open Cup	Total
1	41	(United States) Brad Stuver	5	0	0	5

- Last updated: November 7, 2021
- Source: https://www.austinfc.com/stats/

=== End-of-season awards ===
Award	Winner	Ref
Defender of the Year	Brad Stuver	
Offensive Player of the Year	Diego Fagundez	
