= List of Austin FC records and statistics =

Austin FC is an American professional soccer team based in Austin, Texas, that competes in Major League Soccer (MLS).

This is a list of club records for Austin FC, which dates from their inaugural season in 2021 to present.

== Club records ==
As of November 7, 2026

=== Matches ===
Record	Score	Opponent	Date	Reference
Largest league victory	5–0	v FC Cincinnati	February 26, 2022	
Largest league defeat	0–5	@ San Diego FC	May 13, 2026	
Largest playoff victory	2–1	v FC Dallas	October 23, 2022	
Largest playoff defeat	1–4	v Los Angeles FC	November 2, 2025	
Largest CONCACAF Champions Cup victory	2–0	v (Haiti) Violette	March 14, 2023	
Largest CONCACAF Champions Cup defeat	0–3	@ (Haiti) Violette	March 8, 2023	
Largest Leagues Cup victory	3-0	v (Mexico) Puebla	August 9, 2026	
Largest Leagues Cup defeat	1–3	v (Mexico) Mazatlán	July 21, 2023	
Largest Leagues Cup defeat	1–3	v (Mexico) Juárez	July 29, 2023	
Largest Leagues Cup defeat	0–2	v Los Angeles FC	August 7, 2024	
Largest Leagues Cup defeat	0–2	v (Mexico) Toluca	August 16, 2026	
Largest U.S. Open Cup victory	2–0	v New Mexico United (USLC)	May 10, 2023	
Largest U.S. Open Cup victory	3–1	v Houston Dynamo FC	May 21, 2025	
Largest U.S. Open Cup defeat	0–2	v Chicago Fire FC	May 24, 2023	

=== Streaks ===
Winning	Number	Dates
Longest winning run in all competitions	4	June 30, 2022 – July 12, 2022
Longest league winning run	4	April 10, 2022 – April 30, 2022; June 30, 2022 – July 12, 2022
Most home wins in a row (all competitions)	5	March 30, 2024 – May 18, 2024
Most away wins in a row (all competitions)	4	June 18, 2022 – July 9, 2022
Most league home wins in a row	5	March 30, 2024 – May 18, 2024
Most league away wins in a row	4	June 18, 2022 – July 9, 2022

Unbeaten	Number	Dates
Longest unbeaten run (all competitions)	8	August 19, 2026 – September 26, 2026
Longest league unbeaten run	8	August 19, 2026 – September 26, 2026
Longest home unbeaten run	9	May 14, 2025 – September 21, 2025
Longest away unbeaten run	6	June 18, 2022 - July 30, 2022

Winless	Number	Dates
Longest winless run (all competitions)	10	July 21, 2023 – September 30, 2023
Longest league winless run	8	May 9, 2021 — June 27, 2021; March 18, 2023 – May 13, 2023; August 20, 2023 – September 30, 2023; April 25, 2025 – May 31, 2025
Longest home winless run	7	August 15, 2026 – October 17, 2026
Longest away winless run	16	May 9, 2021 – April 2, 2022; September 13, 2025 – August 1, 2026

Draws	Number	Dates
Most league draws in a row	4	May 14, 2025 – May 28, 2025

Defeats	Number	Dates
Most defeats in a row	5	August 29, 2021 — September 18, 2021; July 21, 2023 – August 30, 2023
Most league defeats in a row	5	August 29, 2021 — September 18, 2021
Most home defeats in a row	4	July 21, 2023 – September 17, 2023; October 10, 2026 – November 7, 2026
Most away defeats in a row	10	June 23, 2021 – March 12, 2022

=== Seasonal ===
Most	Number	Season
Goals scored in a season (all competitions)	70	2022
League goals scored in a season	65	2022
Goals conceded in a season	70	2026
League goals conceded in a season	65	2026
Points in a league season	56	2022
League wins in a season	16	2022
Home league wins in a season	8	2022
Away league wins in a season	8	2022
League draws in a season	10	2026
Home league draws in a season	7	2025
Away league draws in a season	5	2023
League defeats in a season	21	2021
Home league losses in a season	8,	2021
Away league losses in a season	13	2021

Fewest	Number	Season
Goals scored in a season (all competitions)	35	2021
League goals scored in a season	35	2021
Goals conceded in a season	50	2024
League goals conceded in a season	43	2025
League wins in a season	8	2026
Home wins in a season	4	2026
Away wins in a season	2	2021
League draws in a season	4	2021
Home league draws in a season	2	2021
Away league draws in a season	1	2025
League defeats in a season	10	2022
Home league defeats in a season	3	2022
Away league defeats in a season	7	2022

== Player Awards ==
=== CONCACAF Champions League Best XI ===
Round	Leg	Player	Opponent	Ref
Round of 16	2	(Argentina) Sebastián Driussi	Violette AC	

=== MLS Best XI ===
Award	Awardee	Position	Ref
2022 MLS Best XI	(Argentina) Sebastián Driussi	MF	

=== MLS All Star Team ===
Award	Awardee	Position	Selection type	Ref
2022 MLS All-Star Team	(Argentina) Sebastián Driussi	MF	Voted in	
2023 MLS All-Star Team	(Republic of Ireland) Jon Gallagher	DF	Voted in	
2025 MLS All-Star Team	(United States) Brad Stuver	GK	Coach's pick	
2025 MLS All-Star Team	(United States) Brandon Vázquez	FW	Coach's Pick	

=== ATX Player of the Year ===
Year	Offensive	Defensive
2021	(Uruguay) Diego Fagúndez	(United States) Brad Stuver
2022	(Argentina) Sebastián Driussi	(United States) Brad Stuver
2023	(Argentina) Sebastián Driussi	(Finland) Alexander Ring
2024	(Colombia) Jáder Obrian	(United States) Brad Stuver (United States) Brendan Hines-Ike
2025	(United States) Owen Wolff	(United States) Brad Stuver

== Player records ==
Record	Player	Opponent	Date	ref
Youngest player 16 years, 308 days	(United States) Owen Wolff	Sporting Kansas City	November 3, 2021	
Oldest player 35 years, 351 days	(United States) Hector Jiménez	Colorado Rapids	October 19, 2024	
Youngest goal scorer 18 years, 72 days	(United States) Owen Wolff	Real Salt Lake	March 11, 2023	
Oldest goal scorer 35 years, 176 days	(United States) **Christian Ramirez**	San Diego FC	September 26, 2026	
First goal	(Uruguay) Diego Fagúndez	Colorado Rapids	April 21, 2021	
First home goal	(Republic of Ireland) **Jon Gallagher**	Portland Timbers	July 1, 2021	
First Hat Trick	(Senegal) Moussa Djitté	Real Salt Lake	September 14, 2022	
First clean sheet	(United States) **Brad Stuver**	Minnesota United FC	May 1, 2021	
Most saves in a match 11 Saves,	(United States) **Brad Stuver**	Portland Timbers	October 2, 2024	
Most saves in a match 11 Saves,	(United States) **Brad Stuver**	San Jose Earthquakes	April 22, 2026	
Most saves in a season 143 Saves	(United States) **Brad Stuver**	MLS	2024	

=== Most appearances ===
Current players on the Austin roster are shown in bold.

As of November 7, 2026

Rank	Name	Period	MLS	Playoffs	Open Cup	Continental (Note: Appearance(s) in CONCACAF Champions League)	Other (Note: Appearance(s) in Leagues Cup)	Total
1	(Republic of Ireland) **Jon Gallagher**	2021–**present**	192	5	8	2	9	216
2	(United States) **Brad Stuver**	2021–**present**	195	5	5	2	8	215
3	(Venezuela) Daniel Pereira	2021–2026	148	5	7	1	4	165
4	(United States) Owen Wolff	2021–2026	128	4	5	2	7	146
5	(Costa Rica) Julio Cascante	2021–2025	125	5	7	0	4	141
6	(Finland) Alexander Ring	2021–2024	127	3	2	1	4	137
7	(Slovenia) **Žan Kolmanič**	2021–**present**	116	3	6	1	2	128
8	(Argentina) Sebastián Driussi	2021–2024	106	3	1	1	4	115
9	(Brazil) **Guilherme Biro**	2024–**present**	92	2	5	0	7	106
10	(United States) Nick Lima	2021–2023	95	3	2	2	2	104
11	(United States) Ethan Finlay	2022–2024	90	3	3	2	2	100
12	(United States) Brendan Hines-Ike	2024–2026	86	2	4	0	7	99
13	(Uruguay) Diego Fagúndez	2021–2023	86	3	2	2	2	95
14	(Colombia) Jhojan Valencia	2022–2024	67	1	3	1	4	76
15	(Sweden) **Besard Šabović**	2025–**present**	61	2	5	0	4	72
15	(Ukraine) **Oleksandr Svatok**	2024–**present**	62	2	4	0	4	72
17	(Colombia) Jáder Obrian	2024–2025	65	1	3	0	2	71
18	(United States) Gyasi Zardes	2023–2024	61	0	1	1	4	67
19	(Chile) Diego Rubio	2024–2025	58	0	5	0	3	66
20	(Argentina) Maximiliano Urruti	2022–2023	57	3	2	1	1	64
20	(Spain) Ilie Sánchez	2025–2026	54	2	4	0	4	64
20	(Albania) **Myrto Uzuni**	2024-**present**	52	2	6	0	4	64
23	(United States) Hector Jiménez	2021–2024	56	0	2	1	1	60
(Denmark) **Mikkel Desler**	2024-**present**	50	2	4	0	4		60
25	(Argentina) Emiliano Rigoni	2022–2024	51	3	2	2	0	58
25	(United States) **CJ Fodrey**	2023–**present**	51	2	4	0	1	58
27	(Paraguay) Rodney Redes	2021–2023	48	0	3	1	2	54
28	(Ghana) Osman Bukari	2024–2025	42	1	4	0	2	49
29	(United States) **Brandon Vázquez**	2025–**present**	41	0	3	0	4	48
30	(Paraguay) Cecilio Domínguez	2021–2022	38	0	0	0	0	38
30	(Finland) Leo Väisänen	2023–2025	34	0	2	1	1	38
32	(Norway) Ruben Gabrielsen	2022	33	3	1	0	0	37
32	(Argentina) Nicolás Dubersarsky	2025–2026	33	0	4	0	0	37
34	(Uruguay) **Facundo Torres**	2026–**present**	33	0	1	0	2	36
35	(Honduras) **Joseph Rosales**	2026–**present**	30	0	1	0	4	35
35	(Colombia) Jhohan Romaña	2021–2023	35	0	0	0	0	35
37	(Senegal) Moussa Djitté	2021–2024	30	3	0	0	0	33
37	(United States) Christian Ramirez	30	0	0	0	3		33
39	(Brazil) Felipe Martins	2022	28	3	1	0	0	32
39	(Argentina) Tomás Pochettino	2021	31	0	0	0	0	31
40	(Sweden) Adam Lundqvist	2023	23	0	2	2	1	28
41	(United States) Jared Stroud	2021–2022	27	0	0	0	0	27
42	(United States) **Ervin Torres**	2024–**present**	22	0	0	0	4	26
43	(United States) Matt Hedges	2023–2024	21	0	0	0	4	25
44	(Jamaica) **Jon Bell**	2026–**present**	23	0	1	0	0	24
45	(United States) Will Bruin	2023	19	0	0	2	2	23
46	(Finland) Robert Taylor	2025–2026	19	2	1	0	0	22
47	(Netherlands) Danny Hoesen	2021–2022	19	1	1	0	0	21
48	(United States) Matt Besler	2021	20	0	0	0	0	20
48	(Spain) **Jorge Alastuey**	2026–**present**	17	0	0	0	3	20
50	(Poland) **Przemysław Płacheta**	2026–**present**	16	0	0	0	3	19
51	(United States) Sebastian Berhalter	2021	18	0	0	0	0	18
52	(United States) Kipp Keller	2022–2023	13	0	1	1	2	17
53	(The Gambia) Kekuta Manneh	2021	16	0	0	0	0	16
54	(Canada) Jayden Nelson	2026	13	0	1	0	1	15
54	(Serbia) Mateja Đorđević	2025–**present**	11	0	2	0	2	15
56	(United States) Emmanual Perez	2021	10	0	0	0	0	10
56	(France) Sofiane Djeffal	2023	7	0	2	1	0	10

=== Top goalscorers ===
Current players on the Austin roster are shown in bold.

As of November 7, 2026

Rank	Name	Period	MLS	Playoffs	Open Cup	Continental (Note: Appearance(s) in CONCACAF Champions League)	Other (Note: Appearance(s) in Leagues Cup)	Total
1	(Argentina) Sebastián Driussi	2021–2024	45	3	0	2	1	51
2	(Albania) **Myrto Uzuni**	2024–**present**	15	0	3	0	4	22
3	(Uruguay) Diego Fagúndez	2021–2023	15	1	0	0	1	17
4	(Republic of Ireland) **Jon Gallagher**	2021–**present**	13	1	0	0	1	15
5	(Finland) Alexander Ring	2021–2024	12	0	0	0	1	13
6	(United States) Ethan Finlay	2022–2024	11	0	0	0	1	12
6	(United States) **Brandon Vázquez**	2025–**present**	8	0	4	0	0	12
8	(Argentina) Maximiliano Urruti	2022–2023	10	0	1	0	0	11
9	(United States) Gyasi Zardes	2023–2024	9	0	0	0	1	10
9	(United States) Owen Wolff	2021–2026	10	0	0	0	0	10
11	(Paraguay) Cecilio Domínguez	2021–2022	9	0	0	0	0	9
11	(Costa Rica) Julio Cascante	2021–2025	9	0	0	0	0	9
11	(Brazil) **Guilherme Biro**	2024–**present**	9	0	0	0	0	9
11	(United States) **Christian Ramirez**	2026–**present**	9	0	0	0	0	9
15	(Colombia) Jáder Obrian	2024–2025	7	0	0	0	1	8
16	(Argentina) Emiliano Rigoni	2022–2024	6	0	0	0	0	6
16	(Senegal) Moussa Djitté	2021–2024	5	1	0	0	0	6
16	(Ghana) Osman Bukari	2024–2025	4	0	2	0	0	6
16	(Chile) Diego Rubio	2024–2025	6	0	0	0	0	6
16	(Venezuela) Daniel Pereira	2024–2026	4	1	0	0	1	6

=== Hat-tricks ===
Current players on the Austin roster are shown in bold.

As of November 7, 2026

Name	Period	Count	Date	Against	Competition
(Senegal) Moussa Djitté	2021–2024	1	September 14, 2022	(United States) Real Salt Lake	MLS
(Albania) **Myrto Uzuni**	2024–**present**	1	August 9, 2026	(Mexico) Club Puebla	Leagues Cup

=== Most Assists ===
Current players on the Austin roster are shown in bold.

As of October 31, 2026

Rank	Name	Period	MLS	Playoffs	Open Cup	Continental (Note: Appearance(s) in CONCACAF Champions League)	Other (Note: Appearance(s) in Leagues Cup)	Total
1	(Republic of Ireland) **Jon Gallagher**	2021–**present**	22	1	0	0	1	24
2	(Colombia) Daniel Pereira	2021–2026	22	0	0	0	1	23
2	(United States) Owen Wolff	2021–2026	17	1	3	0	2	23
4	(Uruguay) Diego Fagúndez	2021–2023	22	0	0	0	0	22
5	(Finland) Alexander Ring	2021–2024	17	0	0	1	1	19
6	(Argentina) Sebastián Driussi	2021–2025	16	0	1	0	1	18
7	(Slovenia) **Žan Kolmanič**	2021–**present**	12	0	0	0	0	12
7	(United States) Nick Lima	2021–2023	12	0	0	0	0	12
7	(Albania) **Myrto Uzuni**	2024–**present**	11	0	0	0	1	12
10	(Costa Rica) Julio Cascante	2022–2025	9	1	0	0	0	10
10	(United States) Ethan Finlay	2022–2024	10	0	0	0	0	10
10	(Ghana) Osman Bukari	2023–2025	9	0	1	0	0	10
10	(Uruguay) **Facundo Torres**	2026–**present**	9	0	0	0	1	10
14	(Argentina) Emiliano Rigoni	2022–2024	5	0	1	1	0	7
14	(United States) Hector Jiménez	2021–2024	7	0	0	0	0	7
14	(Honduras) **Joseph Rosales**	6	0	1	0	0		7

=== Most clean sheets ===
Current players on the Austin roster are shown in bold.

As of November 7, 2026

Rank	Name	Period	MLS	Playoffs	Open Cup	Continental (Note: Appearance(s) in CONCACAF Champions League)	Other (Note: Appearance(s) in Leagues Cup)	Total
1	(United States) **Brad Stuver**	2021–**present**	41	0	1	1	3	**46**

=== Captaincy ===
Dates	Captain
2021-2022	(Finland) Alexander Ring
2023-2024	(Argentina) Sebastián Driussi
2025	(Spain) Ilie Sánchez
2026	(United States) **Brad Stuver**

== Coaching records ==
As of November 1, 2026

Coach	From	To	Record				
Coach	From	To	G	W	D	L	Win %
(United States) Josh Wolff	July 23, 2019	October 6, 2024	148	50	31	67	33.78
(United States) Davy Arnaud (interim)	October 6, 2024	October 20, 2024	1	1	0	0	100.00
(Spain) Nico Estévez	November 20, 2024	May 18, 2026	57	19	15	23	33.33
(United States) Davy Arnaud (interim)	May 18, 2026	present	24	7	6	11	29.17
Total			230	77	52	101	33.48

== List of seasons ==
As of November 7, 2026

Season	League									Position		Playoffs	USOC	Continental		Average attendance (Note: Avg. attendance only includes statistics from regular season matches.)	Top goalscorer(s) (Note: Top goalscorer(s) includes all goals scored in the regular season, MLS Cup Playoffs, U.S. Open Cup, Leagues Cup, CONCACAF Champions League, FIFA Club World Cup, and other competitive matches.)	
Season	Pld	W	L	D	GF	GA	GD	Pts	PPG	Conf.	Overall	Playoffs	USOC	CCL	LC	Average attendance	Name(s)	Goals
2021	34	9	21	4	35	56	–21	31	0.91	12th	24th	DNQ	NH	–	–	20,738	(Paraguay) Cecilio Dominguez (Uruguay) Diego Fagundez	7
2022	34	16	10	8	65	49	+16	56	1.65	2nd	4th	SF	R3	DNQ	NH	20,738	(Argentina) Sebastián Driussi	25
2023	34	10	15	9	49	55	–6	39	1.15	12th	25th	DNQ	R16	R16	GS	20,738	(Argentina) Sebastián Driussi	13
2024	34	11	14	9	39	48	–9	42	1.24	10th	18th	DNQ	DNP (Note: Changes made by U.S. Soccer for the 2024 U.S. Open Cup allowed MLS Next Pro teams to play. Austin FC II entered the first round of the 2024 U.S. Open Cup.)	DNQ	R32	20,738	(Colombia) Jáder Obrian (Argentina) Sebastián Driussi	8
2025	34	13	13	8	37	45	–8	47	1.28	6th	15th	R1	RU	DNQ	DNQ (Note: CONCACAF changed format for the 2025 Leagues Cup to feature only 18 MLS clubs. Based on these changes Austin FC did not qualify for the 2025 Leagues Cup.)	20,738	(United States) Brandon Vázquez (Albania) Myrto Uzuni	9
2026	34	8	16	10	42	65	–23	34	1.00	14th	26th	DNQ	R32	DNQ	QF	20,738	(Albania) Myrto Uzuni	13
Total	204	67	89	48	267	317	–52	249	1.22	–	–	–	–	–	–	–	(Argentina) Sebastián Driussi	51

== Transfers ==
As per MLS rules and regulations; some transfer fees have been undisclosed and are not included in the tables below.

=== Highest transfer fees paid ===
	Player	From	Fee	Date
1	(Albania) Myrto Uzuni	(Spain) Granada CF	$12 million	January 2025
2	(United States) Brandon Vázquez	(Mexico) C.F. Monterrey	$10 million	January 2025
3	(Uruguay) Facundo Torres	(Brazil) SE Palmeiras	$9.5 million	January 2026
4	(Ghana) Osman Bukari	(Serbia) Red Star Belgrade	$7.5 million	May 2024
5	(Argentina) Sebastián Driussi	(Russia) Zenit Saint Petersburg	$7 million	July 2021
6	(Argentina) Emiliano Rigoni	(Brazil) São Paulo FC	$4 million	July 2022
7	(Argentina) Nicolás Dubersarsky	(Argentina) Instituto	$3 million	January 2025
8	(Paraguay) Rodney Redes	(Paraguay) Guaraní	$2.75 million	July 2020
9	(Paraguay) Cecilio Domínguez	(Argentina) Independiente	$2.5 million	August 2020
10	(Argentina) Tomás Pochettino	(Argentina) Talleres	$2.5 million	February 2021
11	(Finland) Leo Väisänen	(Sweden) IF Elfsborg	$1.8 million	January 2023
12	(Slovenia) Žan Kolmanič	(Slovenia) NK Maribor	$1.5 million	November 2021
12	(Honduras) Joseph Rosales	(United States) Minnesota United FC	$1.5 million	December 2025

=== Highest transfer fees received ===
	Player	From	Fee	Date
1	(Argentina) Sebastián Driussi	(Argentina) River Plate	$10 million and 8.25% sell on	January 2025
2	(United States) Owen Wolff	(United States) Sporting Kansas City	$4.5 million + $3.1 million performance bonus	August 2026
3	(Ghana) Osman Bukari	(Poland) Widzew Łódź	$6.5 million	December 2025
4	(Canada) Jayden Nelson	(England) Bolton Wanderers F.C.	$1.1 million + $1.25 million performance bonus	August 2026
5	(Uruguay) Diego Fagúndez	(United States) LA Galaxy	$900,000 GAM	August 2023
6	(Colombia) Jhohan Romaña	(Argentina) San Lorenzo de Almagro	$750,000	January 2024
7	(Finland) Leo Väisänen	(Sweden) BK Häcken	$450,000	March 2025
8	(United States) Nick Lima	(United States) New England Revolution	$300,000 GAM	December 2023
9	(Canada) Kamal Miller	(Canada) CF Montréal	$225,000 GAM	December 2020
10	(United States) Jared Stroud	(United States) St. Louis City SC	$100,000 GAM	November 2022

== International representation ==
As of September 26, 2026

The following players represented their countries while playing for Austin FC. Many of these players also gained caps/goals while at other clubs. It excludes caps/goals earned by players while on loan from Austin to other clubs.
Figures for active players in bold

=== FIFA World Cup ===
Year	Country	Player	Appearances	Goals
2026	Canada	Jayden Nelson	1	0

=== International caps ===
Confederation	Country	Player	Appearances	Years
CAF	Ghana	Osman Bukari	4	2024–2025
CAF	Liberia	Jimmy Farkarlun	3	2024–2025
CONCACAF	Canada	Jayden Nelson	4	2026
CONCACAF	Costa Rica	Julio Cascante	13	2021–2025
CONCACAF	Honduras	**Joseph Rosales**	5	**2026–**
CONMEBOL	Venezuela	Daniel Pereira	10	2021–2026
UEFA	Albania	**Myrto Uzuni**	14	**2025–**
UEFA	Finland	Leo Väisänen	3	2023–2025
UEFA	Norway	Ruben Gabrielsen	1	2022
UEFA	Ukraine	**Oleksandr Svatok**	6	**2024–**

=== International goals ===
Players are listed in order of goals scored and by alphabetical order

Rank	Player	Nationality	Years played	Goals	Caps
1	**Myrto Uzuni**	(Albania)	**2025–**	**2**	14
2	Jimmy Farkarlun	(Liberia)	2024–2025	**1**	3
2	Jayden Nelson	(Canada)	2026	**1**	4
