= Daniel Pereira (footballer, born 2000) =

Venezuelan footballer (born 2000)

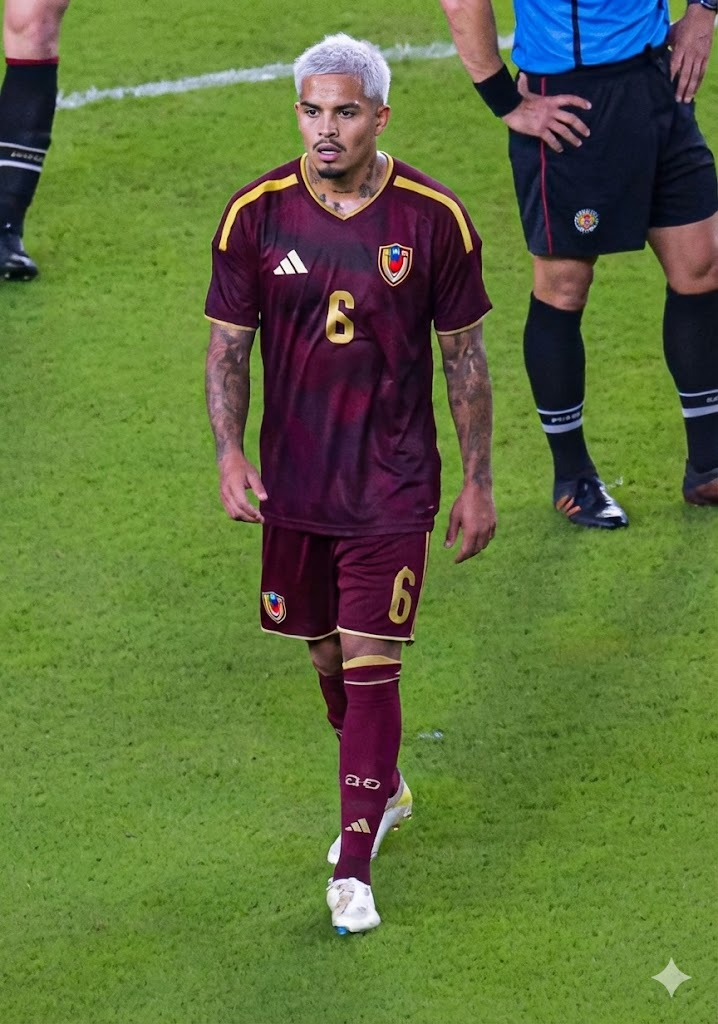
- Pereira playing for Venezuela in 2025

Personal information
- Full name: Daniel Pereira Gil
- Date of birth: 14 July 2000 (age 26)
- Place of birth: Caracas, Venezuela
- Height: 5 ft 9 in (1.75 m)
- Position: Midfielder

Team information
- Current team: CF Montréal
- Number: 7

Youth career
- 2016–2019: Virginia Blue Ridge Star

College career
Years	Team	Apps	(Gls)
2019–2020	Virginia Tech Hokies	26	(6)

Senior career*
Years	Team	Apps	(Gls)
2021–2026	Austin FC	148	(4)
2026–	CF Montréal	7	(0)

International career^{‡}
2012–2013	Venezuela U14		
2014–2015	Venezuela U17		
2023	Venezuela U-23	1	(0)
2023–	Venezuela	13	(0)
- * Club domestic league appearances and goals as of 21:27, 29 August 2026 (UTC) ‡ National team caps and goals as of 22:03, 6 October 2026 (UTC)

Daniel Pereira Gil (born 14 July 2000) is a Venezuelan professional footballer who plays as a midfielder for Major League Soccer club CF Montréal and the Venezuela national team. He played two seasons of college soccer with the Virginia Tech Hokies before being selected with the first overall pick by Austin FC in the 2021 MLS SuperDraft.

== Early life ==
Pereira was born in Caracas, Venezuela, but at the age of 15 emigrated to the United States, where he settled in the Roanoke metropolitan area of Southwest Virginia. Prior to emigrating to the U.S., Pereira played for the Venezuelan U-14 and U-17 national teams.

In high school, Pereira played club soccer for Virginia Blue Ridge Star and high school soccer for Northside High School. While at Northside, Pereira was named the 2019 Virginia High School League Class 3 Boys' Soccer Player of the Year.

Ahead of the 2019 NCAA Division I men's soccer season, Pereira signed a National Letter of Intent to play college soccer for Virginia Tech. During his freshman season, Pereira started in all 19 matches, scoring five goals and providing five assists. During the season, the Hokies were ranked as high as ninth in the United Soccer Coaches poll. Virginia Tech reached the third round of the 2019 NCAA Division I Men's Soccer Tournament, before falling to Stanford.

His sophomore season was more truncated due to the ongoing COVID-19 pandemic. Nevertheless, during the fall segment of the season, Pereira started in all seven of the team's matches, providing a goal and an assist.

== Club career ==
=== Austin FC ===
Following the fall segment of the 2020 NCAA Division I men's soccer season, Pereira was tabbed as a potential top draft pick for the 2021 MLS SuperDraft. On 30 December 2020, Pereira waived his final two years of collegiate eligibility and signed a Generation Adidas contract with Major League Soccer. On 21 January 2021, he was selected as the first overall selection in the 2021 MLS SuperDraft, being drafted by expansion team, Austin FC. Pereira is the first Venezuelan and first South American to be selected first overall in the MLS Draft, as well as the first player from Virginia Tech to be selected first overall. After a successful 2022 season and with continuing success in the 2023 he was called up to the national team to play friendlies in the United States.

== International career ==
Pereria received his first international call-up in June 2023. Dani's first cap came on 15 June 2023. He was subbed in during the 46th minute of a 1–0 victory against Honduras.

== Career statistics ==
=== Club ===
As of matches played on 29 August 2026

Appearances and goals by club, season and competition
Club	Season	League			League Cup		National Cup (Note: Appearance(s) in U.S. Open Cup)		Continental (Note: Appearance(s) in CONCACAF Champions League)		Other		Total	
Club	Season	Division	Apps	Goals	Apps	Goals	Apps	Goals	Apps	Goals	Apps	Goals	Apps	Goals
Austin FC	2021	MLS	25	0	—		—		—		—		25	0
Austin FC	2022	MLS	30	2	3 (Note: Includes appearance(s) in MLS Cup Playoffs)	0	1	0	—		—		33	2
Austin FC	2023	MLS	32	0	—		2	0	1	0	1 (Note: Includes appearance(s) in Leagues Cup)	0	36	0
Austin FC	2024	MLS	26	1	—		—		—		3	1	29	2
Austin FC	2025	MLS	27	1	2	1	3	0	—		—		32	2
Austin FC	2026	MLS	8	0	0	0	1	0	—		0	0	9	0
Austin FC	Club Total		148	4	5	1	7	0	1	0	4	1	164	6
CF Montréal	2026	MLS	7	0	—		—		—		1 (Note: Appearance in Canadian Championship)	1	8	1
Career total			155	4	5	0	7	0	1	0	5	2	172	7

=== International ===
As of match played 6 October 2026

Appearances and goals by national team and year
National team	Year	Apps	Goals
Venezuela	2023	3	0
Venezuela	2024	3	0
Venezuela	2025	2	0
Venezuela	2026	5	0
Total		13	0
