= Leo Väisänen =

Finnish footballer (born 1997)

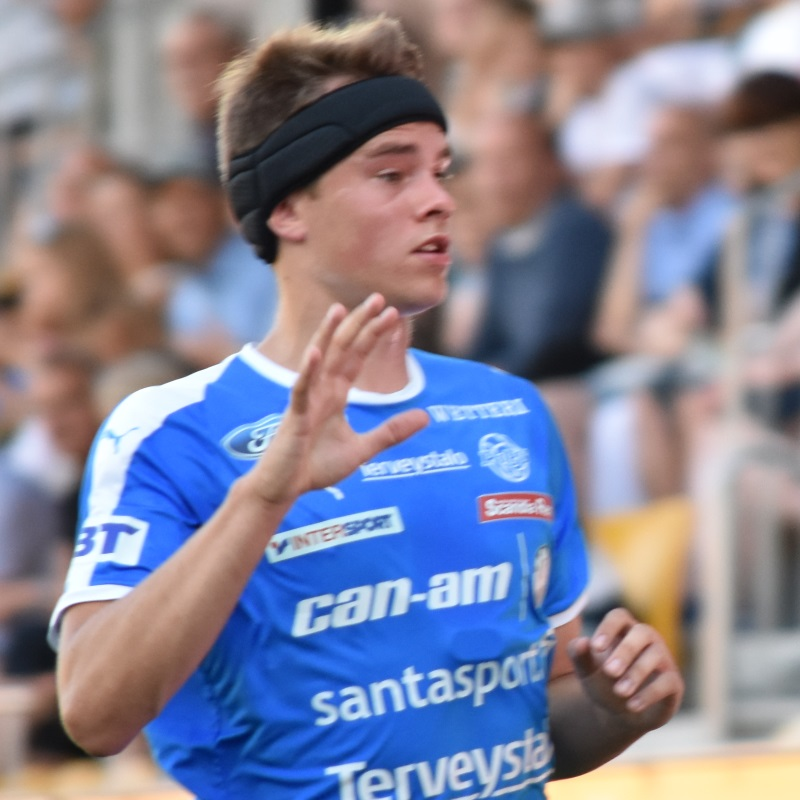
- Väisänen with RoPS in 2018.

Personal information
- Full name: Leo Onni Artturi Väisänen
- Date of birth: 23 July 1997 (age 29)
- Place of birth: Helsinki, Finland
- Height: 1.88 m (6 ft 2 in)
- Position: Centre back

Team information
- Current team: BK Häcken
- Number: 15

Youth career
- –2015: KäPa
- 2015: HJK

Senior career*
Years	Team	Apps	(Gls)
2015–2016	Klubi 04	19	(3)
2016	HJK	3	(0)
2016	→ PK-35 Vantaa (loan)	9	(1)
2017–2018	RoPS	46	(1)
2018–2020	Den Bosch	45	(6)
2020–2022	Elfsborg	76	(3)
2023–2025	Austin FC	34	(1)
2025–	Häcken	1	(0)

International career^{‡}
2014	Finland U17	1	(0)
2015	Finland U18	5	(0)
2015	Finland U19	4	(1)
2017–2018	Finland U21	8	(0)
2019–	Finland	29	(0)
Medal record
Klubi 04
First place	Kakkonen Eastern Group	2015
HJK Helsinki
Second place	Veikkausliiga	2016
Second place	Finnish Cup	2016
RoPS
Second place	Veikkausliiga	2018
- * Club domestic league appearances and goals as of 24 April 2025 ‡ National team caps and goals as of 3 October 2026

Leo Onni Artturi Väisänen (born 23 July 1997) is a Finnish professional footballer who plays as a centre back for BK Häcken in Allsvenskan and the Finland national team. Väisänen was born in Helsinki, Finland. He began his senior club career playing for HJK and RoPS, before signing with Den Bosch at age 21 in 2018.

Väisänen made his international debut for Finland in June 2019, at the age of 21.

== Club career ==
=== HJK ===
Väisänen made his Veikkausliiga debut for HJK on 14 April 2016 in a game against RoPS.

=== RoPS ===
In November 2016 he signed a two-year contract with RoPS. He made his debut on 12 April 2017, playing the full 90 minutes of a 6–2 defeat at Inter Turku.

=== Den Bosch ===
In August 2018, Väisanen was signed by Dutch side FC Den Bosch for an undisclosed fee. He made his debut for the club on 21 September 2018, in an Eerste Divisie match against Almere; he was substituted on in the 61st minute for Stefano Beltrame.

=== Elfsborg ===
On 12 January 2020 Väisänen joined Swedish club IF Elfsborg on a 3.5-year contract, for a transfer fee of €150,000.

=== Austin FC ===
On 4 January 2023, it was announced Väisänen had signed with Major League Soccer (MLS) side Austin FC on a four-year deal, with an option for a further year. The transfer fee was reported to be €1.8 million. He scored his first goal in MLS on 7 October 2023, in a 2–4 home defeat to LAFC.

=== BK Häcken ===
On 24 March 2025, Väisänen signed for BK Häcken until the summer of 2028. On 2 April, he suffered a knee injury in his first match with Häcken and was estimated to miss several months.

== International career ==
He made his Finland national football team debut on 11 June 2019 in a Euro 2020 qualifier against Liechtenstein, as an 86th-minute substitute for Jukka Raitala.

Väisänen was called up in the UEFA Euro 2020 pre-tournament friendly match against Sweden on 29 May 2021. On 1 June 2021 Markku Kanerva published the national team for the UEFA Euro 2020 tournament and Väisänen was named as one of the defenders. On 12 June 2021 Väisänen came in as a 90th-minute substitute for Jukka Raitala in a UEFA Euro 2020 match against Denmark.

== Personal life ==
He is the younger brother of Sauli Väisänen. Their mother Anna-Liisa Tilus-Väisänen is a television presenter for Yle and Miss World 1984 semi-finalist.

== Career statistics ==
=== Club ===
As of 24 April 2025

Appearances and goals by club, season and competition
Club	Season	League			National cup (Note: Includes Suomen Cup, KNVB Beker, Svenska Cupen and U.S. Open Cup)		League cup		Continental		Other		Total	
Club	Season	Division	Apps	Goals	Apps	Goals	Apps	Goals	Apps	Goals	Apps	Goals	Apps	Goals
Klubi 04	2015	Kakkonen	17	1	–		—		–		–		17	1
Klubi 04	2016	Kakkonen	2	2	–		—		–		–		2	2
Klubi 04	Total		19	3	0	0	0	0	0	0	0	0	19	3
HJK	2015	Veikkausliiga	0	0	1	0	0	0	0	0	–		1	0
HJK	2016	Veikkausliiga	3	0	2	1	1	0	0	0	–		5	1
HJK	Total		3	0	3	1	1	0	0	0	0	0	7	1
PK-35 Vantaa (loan)	2016	Veikkausliiga	9	1	–		–		—		–		9	1
RoPS	2017	Veikkausliiga	22	1	0	0	—		–		–		22	1
RoPS	2018	Veikkausliiga	24	0	5	0	—		–		–		29	0
RoPS	Total		55	2	5	0	0	0	0	0	0	0	60	2
Den Bosch	2018–19	Eerste Divisie	28	3	3	0	—		–		–		31	3
Den Bosch	2019–20	Eerste Divisie	17	3	1	0	—		–		–		18	3
Den Bosch	Total		45	6	4	0	0	0	0	0	0	0	49	6
Elfsborg	2020	Allsvenskan	26	0	5	0	—		–		–		31	0
Elfsborg	2021	Allsvenskan	23	3	0	0	–		6 (Note: Appearance(s) in UEFA Europa Conference League)	1	–		29	4
Elfsborg	2022	Allsvenskan	27	0	6	0	–		1	0	–		34	0
Elfsborg	Total		76	3	11	0	0	0	7	1	0	0	94	4
Austin FC	2023	MLS	21	1	2	0	–		1 (Note: Appearance(s) in CONCACAF Champions League)	0	–		24	1
Austin FC	2024	MLS	13	0	0	0	–		–		1 (Note: Appearance(s) in Leagues Cup)	0	14	0
Austin FC	Total		34	1	2	0	0	0	1	0	1	0	38	1
Häcken	2025	Allsvenskan	1	0	0	0	—		–		–		1	0
Career total			233	15	25	1	1	0	8	1	1	0	268	15

=== International ===
As of match played on 3 October 2026.

National team	Year	Competitive		Friendly		Total	
National team	Year	Apps	Goals	Apps	Goals	Apps	Goals
Finland	2019	2 (Note: Appearances in the UEFA Euro 2020 qualifying.)	0	0	0	2	0
Finland	2020	2 (Note: Appearances in the 2020–21 UEFA Nations League.)	0	2	0	4	0
Finland	2021	7 (Note: Six appearances in the 2022 FIFA World Cup qualification, one appearance in UEFA Euro 2020.)	0	2	0	9	0
Finland	2022	5 (Note: Appearances in the 2022–23 UEFA Nations League.)	0	3	0	8	0
Finland	2023	3 (Note: Appearances in the UEFA Euro 2024 qualifying.)	0	0	0	3	0
Finland	2024	0	0	1	0	1	0
Finland	2025	1 (Note: Appearances in the 2026 FIFA World Cup qualification.)	0	0	0	1	0
Finland	2026	1 (Note: Appearances in the 2026–27 UEFA Nations League C.)	0	0	0	1	0
Total		21	0	8	0	29	0

== Honours ==
=== Club ===
Klubi 04

- Kakkonen Eastern Group: 2015

=== Individual ===
- Veikkausliiga Team of the Year: 2018
- Elfsborg Player of the Year: 2021
