= 2023 Austin FC season =

Austin FC
2023 season
- Chairman: Anthony Precourt
- Head coach: Josh Wolff
- Stadium: Q2 Stadium
- MLS: Western Conference: 12th MLS: 25th
- MLS Cup playoffs: Did not qualify
- U.S. Open Cup: Round of 16
- CONCACAF Champions League: Round of 16
- Leagues Cup: Group stage
- Top goalscorer: League: Sebastián Driussi (11); All: Sebastián Driussi (13)
- Average home league attendance: 20,738
- Biggest win: 4 matches by 3 goals (MLS); ATX 2–0 VIO (3/15) (CCL); ATX 2–0 NM (5/10) (USOC)
- Biggest defeat: 3 matches by 3 goals (MLS); VIO 3–0 ATX (3/7) (CCL); ATX 0–2 CHI (5/24) (USOC); ATX 1–3 MZT (7/21) (LC); ATX 1–3 FCJ (7/29) (LC)
Home colors	Away colors
- All statistics correct as of October 22, 2023.

The 2023 Austin FC season was the club's third season in Major League Soccer, the top flight of soccer in the United States. They played in the league's Western Conference and did not qualify for the playoffs.

Austin participated in two new competitions in 2023, their first regional competition (the 2023 Leagues Cup) and continental competitions (the 2023 CONCACAF Champions League), but did not advance in either competition.

== Background ==
Austin FC started playing in the MLS Western Conference in 2021, finishing in 12th place with a record of 9W-4D-21L. 2022 brought many new experiences to Austin FC. They lost their first ever U.S. Open Cup match against San Antonio FC in extra time, won their first trophy, the Copa Tejas, and qualified for their first-ever MLS Cup Playoffs in just their second season as a franchise. Austin FC advanced to the Western Conference Finals but lost to LAFC. They qualified for the 2023 CONCACAF Champions League as a result of their success in 2022.

== Summary ==
=== Pre-season ===
Immediately following the 2022 season, Austin FC started their preparation for the 2023 MLS Season. On November 7, 2022, Austin FC announced multiple roster decision influencing the 2023 season. Jared Stroud was traded to St. Louis City SC, Hector Jiménez's contract is being allowed to expire, Washington Corozo's transfer option was not exercised, and options were declined on Danny Hoesen, Felipe Martins, Freddy Kleemann, Andrew Tarbell, and Will Pulisic.

Austin FC continued shaping their 2023 team during the 2022 MLS Re-Entry Draft, when they traded with DC United for the first selection in that draft for $50,000 general allocation money. With the first selection Austin FC chose midfielder Sofiane Djeffal from DC United. On the same day, Austin FC announced that they selected Forward Alfonso Ocampo-Chavez from the End-of-Year Waiver list from the Seattle Sounders FC, where he had spent time with the MLS Next Pro club Tacoma Defiance. On November 29, 2022, Austin FC and Ocampo-Chavez came to terms on a one-year guarantee through the 2023 season, with a two-year team option through 2025.

In December Austin FC continued to work on their 2023 roster announcing on December 8, 2022, they had resigned Hector Jiménez and announced on December 12, 2022, that they had acquired Gyasi Zardes through free agency. The 2023 MLS SuperDraft was held on December 21, 2022, and Austin FC picked up CJ Fodrey (GA) and Valentin Noël in the first round, Jackson Walti in the second round, and Salvatore Mazzaferro in the third round.

Austin FC started the new year by strengthening their goalkeeping corps, adding Matt Bersano from the free agent list. Austin FC strengthened their defensive unit on January 4, 2023, by acquiring Leo Väisänen from IF Elfsborg. One day after signing Väisänen, Austin FC announced that Ruben Gabrielsen will be leaving the team after just one year and moving to Lillestrøm SK Continuing to shape the team for 2023 season, Austin FC announced on January 6, 2023, that they had come to an agreement to transfer Tomás Pochettino to Brazilian side Fortaleza Esporte Clube. Adding more depth to their defensive formation, Austin FC announced on January 10, 2023, they had signed Adam Lundqvist from their cross-state rival Houston Dynamo for $500,000 GAM over the 2023–2024 seasons. Looking to build their defense for the longest MLS season to date, Austin FC announced they had signed Amro Tarek as a free agent on January 27, 2023. On January 31, 2023, Austin FC announced Moussa Djitté had been loaned to AC Ajaccio on a short-term loan through the end of the Ligue 1 season, with an option to purchase at the end of the season. After a trial period for a Veteran striker, Austin FC announced on February 10, 2023, that they had signed Will Bruin to a one-year contract, with an option for a second year. The club extended Sebastian Driussi for three years with a fourth-year option on February 14 and named him the next captain. Days before the first match of the season Austin FC extended Diego Fagúndez for three years with a fourth year option, finalizing preseason moves for the team

=== Slow start and early Champions League exit - February / March / April ===
Austin FC started the 2023 season with a 3–2 loss to St. Louis City SC in the latter's inaugural match. Julio Cascante was subbed off in the 11th minute after suffering an adductor strain injury that sidelined him for more than two months. Austin quickly rebounded with a 1–0 win over CF Montreal where Maximiliano Urruti scored the game-winner the 88th minute. After the first leg against Violette, the Verde and Black returned to MLS competition against RSL where Owen Wolff scored his first professional goal and the match-winner in the 33rd minute in a 2–1 victory. Austin then suffered their first road loss of the season in a 2–0 defeat to their cross-state rivals, the Houston Dynamo. Ending the month of March with a 1–1 draw against the Colorado Rapids, Austin FC sat in the middle of the table for both the western conference and Supporters Shield standings heading into the second month of the season. At this point, Jon Gallagher led the team with 3 goals, while prized striker Sebastian Driussi had 1 goal in the opening match against St. Louis while Diego Fagundez, Emiliano Rigoni, Gyasi Zardes, Ethan Finlay, and Will Bruin hadn't scored in the first 5 league matches for the club. On March 22, the club announced Aleksandar Radovanović was signed on a short-term loan from K.V. Kortrijk through June 30, 2023, with an option to buy, which the club later declined.

After a two-week break, Austin FC continued the season on the road against LAFC and lost 3–0 on the back of a hat-trick by Denis Bouanga in the first Western Conference Final rematch. Adding to the backline's struggles, Austin suffered another blow to the defense; on April 13, the team announced Žan Kolmanič injured his ACL during training and had season-ending surgery. Austin continued to struggle offensively in a home fixture against Vancouver, where they lost Fagundez for a month to a groin injury in a 0–0 draw, and then lost to the LA Galaxy 2–0 the following week. El Tree ended the month with a 2–2 comeback draw at home against the San Jose Earthquakes. Rigoni scored his first goal for the club in the 40th minute, and Driussi scored for the first time since the opening match to equalize in the 78th minute.

==== CONCACAF Champions League ====
Outside of league play, Austin FC travelled to the Dominican Republic to take on the Haitian side Violette AC for their first ever continental match in the CONCACAF Champions League, which they lost 3–0 on March 7. Miche-Naider Chéry notched a first half brace for Violette, beating Amro Tarek on two headers. Tarek then had an own-goal early in the second half to ruin any chance of an Austin comeback. A week later, after beating RSL in league play, Austin FC faced Violette in the return fixture at Q2 Stadium. Despite taking 35 shots and a brace from Driussi, Austin FC fell in the series on an aggregate score of 3–2. Their 2023 CONCACAF Champions League run came to a premature end in what was arguably the biggest upset in the history of the competition; because of the political unrest in Haiti, Violette hadn't played a competitive match in 289 days before the first leg.

=== Condensed schedule and first U.S. Open Cup run - May / June ===
Austin FC earned their second straight 2–2 comeback draw, but this time against the Portland Timbers on May 6. Jon Gallagher scored his 4th goal of the season to lead all MLS defenders on a cross from Emiliano Rigoni. Will Bruin was later subbed into the game and the former Sounder could not have scored his first goal with the Verde and Black in a more timely fashion, tying the match with Austin's latest away goal in their short history in the second minute of stoppage time on a cross from Owen Wolff. However, before the Portland match, Driussi suffered a groin injury of his own and would also miss a month. After the Portland match, Wolff was called up to the U-20 team for the FIFA U-20 World Cup in Argentina and would spend up to a month away from the club. The following week, Rodney Redes was sent off for earning two yellow cards against FC Dallas, and Jesus Ferreira scored the match-winner in the 89th minute, to defeat the short-handed Austin FC 1–0. In a midweek game and with a depleted roster, Austin FC won their first league competition in two months, defeating Seattle Sounders FC 2–1 at Lumen Field on goals from Ethan Finlay and Gyasi Zardes, both their firsts of the campaign. Zardes scored another game-winner four days later helping beat Toronto FC 1–0. A week later, Zardes scored for the third consecutive match and became the 13th player in MLS history to score 100 goals. However, the milestone was not enough for Austin as they conceded two goals and lost to the Dynamo 2–1 in their first Copa Tejas match of the season. Four days later on May 31 against Minnesota United FC, Driussi returned to action for the first time in a month and scored the match-winner in the 82nd minute. The Loons thought they had the equalizer in the 87th minute, but VAR ruled that Hassani Dotson was offside. Brad Stuver then shut the door on Minnesota, making three saves in stoppage time.

Continuing their up and down season, Austin FC returned to Q2 on June 3, losing 2–1 to Real Salt Lake on a brace by Rubio Rubin. Injuries continued to plague the 2023 season, as Alexander Ring was pulled from a starting line up, forcing Aleksandar Radovanović to step in despite playing with a shoulder injury. Last minute changes by Peter Vermes and a strong performance by Sporting Kansas City resulted in a 4–1 loss dropping Austin out of the playoff picture. After a much-needed rest period, a rejuvenated Austin FC finished June with back-to-back 3-0 Copa Tejas wins at Q2 over four days. Ethan Finlay and Gyasi Zardes scored goals in both matches while Diego Fagundez and Julio Cascante scored their first goals of the season against FC Dallas and the Houston Dynamo, respectively. The wins gave Austin the lead in the Copa Tejas standings and an opportunity to defend the trophy with a win in Frisco in late August.

Due to the mounting injuries, David Rodríguez became the first Austin FC II player to sign a short-term agreement with the club on May 17 but did not appear in a match. In the U-20 World Cup, Owen Wolff had a match-winning assist in the group stage against Ecuador and scored a goal in the Round of 16 against New Zealand, but the Stars and Stripes lost in the Quarterfinals against Uruguay. On June 2, Daniel Pereira was called up to the Venezuela national team for the first time. On June 27, Jon Gallagher was announced as an MLS All-Star.

On June 30, Austin FC named Rodolfo Borrell as their new Sporting Director, replacing Claudio Reyna. Borrell was most recently Pep Guardiola's first assistant at Manchester City, and the club won 15 trophies in the 9 years he was affiliated there.

==== U.S. Open Cup ====
Austin FC entered the U.S. Open Cup in the Round of 32 and were drawn against USL team New Mexico United for a home match on May 10 where they accomplished another milestone for the club, winning their first U.S. Open Cup match 2–0. Redes tallied his first goal with the club to open the scoring in the 24th minute and Maxi Urruti added another, with Rigoni contributing to both goals. However, the Verde and Black lost in the Round of 16 against the Chicago Fire 2–0, ending their U.S. Open Cup run. Making matters worse, Leo Väisänen tore his LCL in the Chicago match and was expected to miss at least two months.

=== First Leagues Cup - July / August ===
Austin FC started their three-game road trip in South Florida playing Inter Miami CF to a 1–1 tie when Nick Lima scored his first goal for the club, then beat Minnesota United FC 4-1 where Driussi scored a brace, added an assist, and by doing so became the first Austin FC player to make 50 goal contributions. They weren't able to sweep the road trip, losing 2–1 in Vancouver. They also lost Emiliano Rigoni to an MCL injury. El Tree won their last match before the Leagues Cup break with a 2–1 win against Sporting Kansas City, but lost Daniel Pereira and Driussi in the match to shoulder and groin injuries, respectively. The victory against Kansas City was the first time in franchise history Austin FC won three consecutive home matches, and they sit 5th in the West heading into the break.

On July 24, Austin FC traded for CB and former FC Dallas captain Matt Hedges for $475,000 GAM in 2023 and more in 2024 to Toronto FC, if his options are exercised. Hedges appeared in more games than any FC Dallas player with 349 caps from 2012 to 2022. On August 1, Austin FC traded their first-ever goal scorer Diego Fagundez to the LA Galaxy for Memo Rodríguez and at least $300,000 GAM.

Austin returned to action after a three-week break and lost on the road to St. Louis City SC 6–3, getting three second half goals from Driussi, Will Bruin, and Rigoni. The 6 goals allowed set a franchise record for most goals allowed in a single match. In their final Copa Tejas match of the season, Austin FC failed to secure the trophy by losing to FC Dallas 1–0 on a last minute headed goal from Nkosi Tafari. To end the month of August, Austin lost their fifth game in a row in all competition and earned zero points after returning from Leagues Cup competition, losing to the Seattle Sounders FC 2–1. In the Sounders match, Driussi became the first Austin FC player to score 40 goals for the club.

==== Leagues Cup ====
Austin FC played their first Leagues Cup matches against Mazatlán on July 21 and Juárez on July 29 at Q2 Stadium. Going into the Leagues Cup break, Mazatlán sat at 15th in the Liga MX table with a draw and two losses after a last place finish in 2023. Juárez currently sits in 3rd with a draw and two impressive comeback wins over América and Toluca.

The Verde and Black lost 3–1 against Mazatlán snapping their home winning streak. Diego Fagundez scored his last goal for the club, a penalty to tie the match in the 65th minute, but Andrés Montaño scored for Mazatlán 30 seconds after the restart. Minutes later, Bruin thought he had the tying goal for Austin before being ruled offside, then Eduard Bello tacked on the third and final goal for Mazatlán in the 88th minute after VAR ruled he was onside. Mazatlán then won the group after defeating Juárez in penalties on July 25, leaving Austin in a position where they can only advance as the group runner-up by beating Juárez outright. Austin was unable to maintain an early lead after allowing Juárez to level it up 12 minutes later on a free kick by Sebastian Saucedo from outside the box. Coming out of the half-time break, Juárez's tactical adjustments allowed them to put two more goals on the board in the 62nd and 69th minutes, both scored by Aitor García, eliminating Austin FC from the 2023 Leagues Cup tournament.

=== End of the season - September / October ===
Austin started September by earning an away point, drawing with New England 2–2. Alex Ring evened the score with an extra-time goal, adding to Rigoni's first half goal. During the second outing of the month, Austin fell to Portland 2–1 at home. Three days later Austin earned a point on the road, drawing with the New York Red Bulls 1–1 on the 10th goal of the season by Sebastián Driussi. On September 30, FC Dallas and the Houston Dynamo played to a draw, winning Austin FC its second consecutive Copa Tejas, becoming the first MLS club to win it twice. But as the final whistle blew in Houston, the Verde and Black were losing 1–0 to the Colorado Rapids and that score held, so the club extended their winless streak to a franchise-record 10 games.

Austin FC kept their playoff hopes alive with a strong home performance against D.C. United, winning the match 3–0 on goals from Will Bruin, Sebastián Driussi, and Matt Hedges, but lost 4–2 to LAFC three days later to be eliminated from playoff contention. Leo Väisänen scored his first goal for the club late in the second half, while Denis Bouanga scored 2 goals for LAFC to take the Golden Boot lead with his 18th and 19th goals of the season. Austin FC ended their 2023 campaign on the road in San Jose with a 1–1 draw. Austin season record was 10 wins, 15 loses, and 9 draws, for a total of 39 points.

== Management team ==
Position	Name
Chairman	(United States) Anthony Precourt
Sporting Director	Rodolfo Borrell
Vice President, Player Personnel	Sean Rubio
Head coach	(United States) Josh Wolff
Assistant coach	(United States) Davy Arnaud
Assistant coach	(Chile) Rodrigo Rios
Assistant coach	(United States) Terry Boss
Assistant coach	(United States) Preston Burpo
Chief Scout	(Spain) Manuel Junco

== Roster ==
As of October 7, 2023.

No.	Name	Nationality	Position(s)	Date of birth (age)	Signed in	Previous club	Apps	Goals
Goalkeepers
1	Brad Stuver	(United States)	GK	April 16, 1991 (age 35)	2020	(United States) New York City FC	40	0
12	Damian Las (HG)	(United States)	GK	April 11, 2002 (age 24)	2022	(England) Fulham F.C.	0	0
20	Matt Bersano	(United States)	GK	September 10, 1992 (age 34)	2023	(United States) San Jose Earthquakes	0	0
Defenders
2	Matt Hedges	(United States)	CB	April 1, 1990 (age 36)	2023	(Canada) Toronto FC	7	1
4	Kipp Keller (GA)	(United States)	CB	July 14, 2000 (age 26)	2022	(United States) Saint Louis University	10	0
15	Leo Väisänen	(Finland)	CB	July 23, 1997 (age 29)	2023	(Sweden) IF Elfsborg	24	1
16	Hector Jiménez	(United States)	RB	November 3, 1988 (age 38)	2020	(United States) Columbus Crew SC	5	0
17	Jon Gallagher	(Republic of Ireland)	LB/RB	February 23, 1996 (age 30)	2020	(United States) Atlanta United FC	39	5
18	Julio Cascante	(Costa Rica)	CB	October 3, 1993 (age 33)	2020	(United States) Portland Timbers	28	2
21	Adam Lundqvist	(Sweden)	LB	March 20, 1994 (age 32)	2023	(United States) Houston Dynamo FC	26	0
23	Žan Kolmanič (Note: Season ending injury) (U22) (Note: https://www.mlssoccer.com/news/mls-launches-u22-initiative-to-support-further-investment-in-young-players)	(Slovenia)	LB	March 3, 2000 (age 26)	2021	(Slovenia) Maribor	7	0
24	Nick Lima	(United States)	RB	November 17, 1994 (age 31)	2020	(United States) San Jose Earthquakes	39	1
26	Charlie Asensio	(United States)	RB	January 18, 2000 (age 26)	2022	(United States) Clemson Tigers	0	0
27	Brandan Craig	(United States)	DF	April 7, 2004 (age 22)	2023	(United States) Philadelphia Union	0	0
	Joe Hafferty (Note: Short term agreement from Austin FC II)	(United States)	DF	March 21, 1998 (age 28)	2023	(United States) Austin FC II	0	0
Midfielders
5	Jhojan Valencia	(Colombia)	MF	July 27, 1996 (age 30)	2022	(Colombia) Deportivo Cali	31	0
6	Daniel Pereira (GA)	(Venezuela)	MF	July 14, 2000 (age 26)	2021	(United States) Virginia Tech Hokies	36	0
7	Emiliano Rigoni (DP)	(Argentina)	RW	February 4, 1993 (age 33)	2022	(Brazil) São Paulo FC	37	5
8	Alexander Ring (DP)	(Finland)	MF	April 9, 1991 (age 35)	2020	(United States) New York City FC	32	2
10	Sebastián Driussi (DP) (captain)	(Argentina)	MF	February 9, 1996 (age 30)	2021	(Russia) Zenit Saint Petersburg	30	13
13	Ethan Finlay	(United States)	RW	August 6, 1990 (age 36)	2021	(United States) Minnesota United FC	40	6
19	CJ Fodrey (GA)	(United States)	MF	February 10, 2004 (age 22)	2023	(United States) San Diego State	4	0
22	Sofiane Djeffal	(France)	MF	April 19, 1999 (age 27)	2023	(United States) DC United	10	0
30	Memo Rodríguez (HG)	(United States)	MF	December 27, 1995 (age 30)	2023	(United States) LA Galaxy	9	0
31	Valentin Noël	(France)	MF	April 27, 1999 (age 27)	2023	(United States) Austin FC II	1	0
32	David Rodríguez	(United States)	MF	May 5, 2002 (age 24)	2023	(United States) Austin FC II	0	0
33	Owen Wolff (HG)	(United States)	MF	December 30, 2004 (age 21)	2020	(United States) Austin FC Academy	31	2
Forward
9	Gyasi Zardes	(United States)	FW	September 2, 1991 (age 35)	2023	(United States) Colorado Rapids	31	6
11	Rodney Redes (U22)	(Paraguay)	FW	February 22, 2000 (age 26)	2020	(Paraguay) Guaraní	6	2
28	Alfonso Ocampo-Chavez (HG)	(United States)	FW	March 25, 2002 (age 24)	2023	(United States) Seattle Sounders FC	0	0
29	Will Bruin	(United States)	FW	October 24, 1989 (age 37)	2023	(United States) Seattle Sounders FC	22	3
37	Maximiliano Urruti	(Argentina)	FW	February 2, 1991 (age 35)	2021	(United States) Houston Dynamo FC	28	2

== Transfers ==
=== In ===
Date	Position	No.	Name	From	Fee	Ref.
November 17, 2022	MF	22	(France) Sofiane Djeffal	(United States) DC United	$50,000 GAM	
November 17, 2022	FW	28	(United States) Alfonso Ocampo-Chavez	(United States) Seattle Sounders FC	Free	
December 8, 2022	DF	16	(United States) Hector Jiménez	(United States) Austin FC	Free	
December 12, 2022	FW	9	(United States) Gyasi Zardes	(United States) Colorado Rapids	Free	
January 3, 2023	GK	20	(United States) Matt Bersano	(United States) San Jose Earthquakes	Free	
January 4, 2023	DF	15	(Finland) Leo Väisänen	(Sweden) IF Elfsborg	$1,800,000	
January 10, 2023	DF	21	(Sweden) Adam Lundqvist	(United States) Houston Dynamo FC	$500,000 GAM	
January 27, 2023	DF	31	(Egypt) Amro Tarek	(Egypt) Al Masry SC	Free	
February 10, 2023	FW	29	(United States) Will Bruin	(United States) Seattle Sounders FC	Free	
July 26, 2023	DF	2	(United States) Matt Hedges	(Canada) Toronto FC	$475,000 GAM	
August 1, 2023	MF		(United States) Memo Rodríguez	(United States) LA Galaxy	Trade Diego Fagúndez + receive $900,000 GAM	

=== Loan in ===
No.	Pos.	Player	Loaned from	Start	End	Source
66	DF	(Serbia) Aleksandar Radovanović	(Belgium) Kortrijk	March 22, 2023	June 30, 2023	
32	MF	(United States) David Rodríguez	(United States) Austin FC II	May 17, 2023	May 21, 2023	
27	DF	(United States) Brandan Craig	(United States) Philadelphia Union	July 5, 2023	December 31, 2023	
31	MF	(France) Valentin Noël	(United States) Austin FC II	July 21, 2023	July 29, 2023	
	DF	(United States) Joe Hafferty	(United States) Austin FC II	September 20, 2023	September 24, 2023	

=== Out ===
Date	Position	No.	Name	To	Type	Fee	Ref.
November 7, 2022	MF	20	(United States) Jared Stroud	(United States) St. Louis City SC	Transfer	$100,000 GAM	
November 7, 2022	DF	16	(United States) Hector Jiménez	(United States) Austin FC	Out of Contract		
November 7, 2022	FW	9	(Netherlands) Danny Hoesen	(Netherlands) FC Emmen	Option Declined		
November 7, 2022	DF	19	(United States) Freddy Kleemann	(United States) Tampa Bay Rowdies	Option Declined		
November 7, 2022	MF	22	(Brazil) Felipe Martins	(United States) Orlando City SC	Option Declined		
November 7, 2022	GK	31	(United States) Andrew Tarbell	(United States) Houston Dynamo FC	Option Declined		
November 7, 2022	GK	34	(United States) Will Pulisic	(United States) Minnesota United FC 2	Option Declined		
November 7, 2022	FW	32	(Ecuador) Washington Corozo	(Peru) Sporting Cristal	Option to Buy Declined		
January 5, 2023	DF	4	(Norway) Ruben Gabrielsen	(Norway) Lillestrøm SK	Transfer		
January 6, 2023	MF		(Argentina) Tomás Pochettino	(Brazil) Fortaleza Esporte Clube	Transfer		
July 26, 2023	DF	3	(Egypt) Amro Tarek	(Egypt) Tala'ea El Gaish SC	Buyout		
August 1, 2023	MF	14	(Uruguay) Diego Fagúndez	(United States) LA Galaxy	Trade + Receive GAM		

=== Loan out ===
No.	Pos.	Player	Loaned to	Start	End	Source
2	FW	(Senegal) Moussa Djitté	(France) AC Ajaccio	January 31, 2023	June 30, 2023	
3	DF	(Colombia) Jhohan Romaña	(Paraguay) Club Olimpia	February 17, 2023	December 31, 2023	
2	FW	(Senegal) Moussa Djitté	(Turkey) Bandırmaspor	July 3, 2023	June 30, 2024	

=== MLS SuperDraft picks ===
2023 Austin FC SuperDraft Picks
Round	Selection	Player	Position	College	Notes	Ref.
1	13	(United States) CJ Fodrey	MF	San Diego State	Generation Adidas; Acquired from Houston Dynamo for $50,000 GAM in 2023 and 2024 and the 27th overall pick Houston Dynamo acquired it from Vancouver Whitecaps FC for $225,000 GAM and the 5th overall pick Previous Experience with San Diego Loyal	
1	20	(France) Valentin Noël	MF	Pittsburgh	Pick acquired from St. Louis City SC for GAM; St. Louis City SC acquired from Charlotte FC via trade Charlotte FC acquired from Nashville SC for International Roster spot and $400,000 GAM; Signed by Austin FC II on March 3, 2023	
2	27 (56)	(United States) Jackson Walti	MF	Pittsburgh	Signed by Austin FC II on March 3, 2023; Traded to Colorado Rapids 2 on July 28, 2023	
3	14 (72)	(Canada) Salvatore Mazzaferro	DF	South Florida	Pick acquired from Columbus Crew SC via trade Previous experience with Toronto FC II; Signed by Austin FC II on March 3, 2023	

=== New contracts ===
Date	Pos.	No.	Player	Contract until	Ref.
November 10, 2022	DF	17	(Republic of Ireland) Jon Gallagher	2026 + 1yr option	
November 11, 2022	GK	1	(United States) Brad Stuver	2025 + 1yr option	
December 8, 2022	DF	16	(United States) Hector Jiménez	2023	
February 14, 2023	MF	10	(Argentina) Sebastián Driussi	2025 + 1yr option	
February 22, 2023	MF	14	(Uruguay) Diego Fagúndez	2025 + 1yr option	
April 11, 2023	DF	18	(Costa Rica) Julio Cascante	2025 + 1yr option	

== Non-competitive fixtures ==
=== Preseason ===
January 21, 2023	Austin FC	2–3	Philadelphia Union	Bradenton, FL
11:00 am CT	Cascante 27'; Noël 54'	Report	Bedoya 45+4'; Bueno 67'; Donovan 80'	Stadium: IMG Academy

January 27, 2022	Austin FC	2–3	FC Cincinnati	Clearwater, FL
1:00 pm CT	Rodríguez 11'; Zardes 83'	Report	Hagglund 20'; Brenner 31'; Badji 91'	Stadium: Walter Campbell Sports Park
Note: Played in four 30-minute periods for a total of 120 minutes.

February 4, 2023	Austin FC	5–0	El Paso Locomotive FC	Austin, Texas
1:00 pm CT	Driussi 15'; Wolff 33'; Rodríguez 70'; Finlay 72'; Urruti 110'	Report		Stadium: St. David's Performance Center
Note: Played as two 45-minute halves and a 30-minute extra period

February 11, 2023	Austin FC	4–1	Louisville City FC	Austin, Texas
11:00 am CT	Zardes 17'; Driussi 24'; Fagúndez 51'; Ring 94'	Report	64'	Stadium: St. David's Performance Center
Note: Played as two 45-minute halves and a 30-minute extra period

February 15, 2023	Austin FC	1–1	Sacramento Republic FC	Austin, Texas
7:30 pm CT	Rigoni 86'	Report	32'	Stadium: Q2 Stadium

February 18, 2023	Inter Miami CF	2–2	Austin FC	Ft. Lauderdale, FL
3:00 pm CT	Jean 62'; Pizarro 68'	Report	Rigoni 53'; Wolff 86'	Stadium: DRV PNK Stadium

== Competitive fixtures ==
=== Overall record ===
Competition	First match	Last match	Starting round	Final position	Record							
Competition	First match	Last match	Starting round	Final position	Pld	W	D	L	GF	GA	GD	Win %
MLS Regular Season	February 25, 2023	October 21, 2023	Matchday 1	12th Western Conference, 25th Overall	34	10	9	15	49	55	−6	29.41
CONCACAF Champions League	March 7, 2023	March 14, 2023	Round of 16	Round of 16	2	1	0	1	2	3	−1	50.00
U.S. Open Cup	May 10, 2023	May 24, 2023	Round of 32	Round of 16	2	1	0	1	2	2	+0	50.00
Leagues Cup	July 21, 2023	July 29, 2023	Group stage	Group Stage	2	0	0	2	2	6	−4	0.00
Total					40	12	9	19	55	66	−11	30.00

Last updated: September 30, 2023
Source: Soccerway

=== Major League Soccer Regular Season ===
==== Standings ====
===== Western Conference =====
MLS Western Conference table (2023)
Pos	Team	Pld	W	L	T	GF	GA	GD	Pts
10	Portland Timbers	34	11	13	10	46	58	−12	43
11	Minnesota United FC	34	10	13	11	46	51	−5	41
12	Austin FC	34	10	15	9	49	55	−6	39
13	LA Galaxy	34	8	14	12	51	67	−16	36
14	Colorado Rapids	34	5	17	12	26	54	−28	27

Source: MLS
Rules for classification: 1) points; 2) total wins; 3) total goal differential; 4) total goals scored; 5) fewer disciplinary points; 6) away goal differential; 7) away goals scored; 8) home goals differential; 9) home goals scored; 10) coin toss (2 clubs tied) or drawing of lots (≥3 clubs tied)

===== Overall =====
Overall MLS standings table
Pos	Team	Pld	W	L	T	GF	GA	GD	Pts	Qualification
23	D.C. United	34	10	14	10	45	49	−4	40	
24	Chicago Fire FC	34	10	14	10	39	51	−12	40	
25	Austin FC	34	10	15	9	49	55	−6	39	
26	LA Galaxy	34	8	14	12	51	67	−16	36	
27	Inter Miami CF (L)	34	9	18	7	41	54	−13	34	Qualification for the CONCACAF Champions Cup round of 16 (Note: As 2023 Leagues Cup champions)

Source: MLS
Rules for classification: 1) points; 2) total wins; 3) total goal differential; 4) total goals scored; 5) fewer disciplinary points; 6) away goal differential; 7) away goals scored; 8) home goals differential; 9) home goals scored; 10) coin toss (2 clubs tied) or drawing of lots (≥3 clubs tied)
(L) Leagues Cup winner

==== Matches ====
February 25, 2023 1	Austin FC	2–3	St. Louis City SC	Austin, Texas
7:30 p.m. (CST)	Driussi 45+4'; Gallagher 72'	Report	Ostrák (yellow card) 17'; Parker 24'; Stroud 78'; Klauss 86'	Stadium: Q2 Stadium; Attendance: 20,738; Referee: Allen Chapman

March 4, 2023 2	Austin FC	1–0	CF Montreal	Austin, Texas
7:30 p.m. (CST)	Wolff (yellow card) 22'; Urruti 88'	Report	Saliba (yellow card) 8'; Piette (yellow card) 57'	Stadium: Q2 Stadium; Attendance: 20,738; Referee: Lukasz Szpala

March 11, 2023 3	Real Salt Lake	1–2	Austin FC	Sandy, Utah
8:30 p.m. (CST)	Glad 22'; Kreilach (yellow card) 41'	Report	Gallagher 9'; Wolff 33'	Stadium: America First Field; Attendance: 20,052; Referee: Alex Chilowicz

March 18, 2023 4	Houston Dynamo FC	2–0	Austin FC	Houston, Texas
7:30 p.m. (CDT)	Franco (yellow card) 59'; Bassi 71' (pen.); Herrera 86'	Report	Väisänen (yellow card) 19'; Fagúndez (yellow card) 52'; Lundqvist (yellow card) 70'	Stadium: Shell Energy Stadium; Attendance: 19,047; Referee: Drew Fischer

March 25, 2023 5	Austin FC	1–1	Colorado Rapids	Austin, Texas
7:30 p.m. (CDT)	Gallagher 5'; Ring (yellow card) 53'; Pereira (yellow card) 90+6'	Report	Maxsø (yellow card) 47'; Bassett (yellow card) 59'; Acosta (yellow card) 64'; Cabral 85'; Priso (yellow card) 90+6'	Stadium: Q2 Stadium; Attendance: 20,738; Referee: Ted Unkel

April 8, 2023 6	Los Angeles FC	3–0	Austin FC	Los Angeles, California
6:30 p.m. (CDT)	Bouanga 40', 57', 68'	Report	Lima (yellow card) 67'	Stadium: BMO Stadium; Attendance: 22,199; Referee: Victor Rivas

April 15, 2023 7	Austin FC	0–0	Vancouver Whitecaps FC	Austin, Texas
7:30 p.m. (CDT)	Driussi (yellow card) 40'; Lima (yellow card) 68'	Report	White (yellow card) 42'; Cubas (yellow card) 45'	Stadium: Q2 Stadium; Attendance: 20,738; Referee: Mark Allatin

April 22, 2023 8	Los Angeles Galaxy	2–0	Austin FC	Carson, California
9:30 p.m. (CDT)	Puig (yellow card) 3', (goal) 64'; Hernández 54', (yellow card) 90+1'; Boyd (yellow card) 61'; Aguirre (yellow card) 90+4'	Report	Urruti (yellow card) 40'; Väisänen (yellow card) 43'; Ring (yellow card) 90+1'	Stadium: Dignity Health Sports Park; Attendance: 18,875; Referee: Chris Penso

April 29, 2023 9	Austin FC	2–2	San Jose Earthquakes	Austin, Texas
7:30 p.m. (CDT)	Rigoni 40'; Driussi 78'; Pereira (yellow card) 90+5'	Report	Yueill 21', (yellow card) 90+5'; Monteiro (yellow card) 68'; Ebobisse 75'	Stadium: Q2 Stadium; Attendance: 20,738; Referee: Guido Gonzales Jr.

May 6, 2023 10	Portland Timbers	2–2	Austin FC	Portland, Oregon
9:30 p.m. (CDT)	Župarić 33', (yellow card) 87'; Boli (yellow card) 40'; Bravo (yellow card) 56', (goal) 71'	Report	Gallagher 59'; Bruin 90+2'	Stadium: Providence Park; Attendance: 23,318; Referee: Jon Freemon

May 13, 2023 11	Austin FC	0–1	FC Dallas	Austin, Texas
7:30 p.m. (CDT)	Väisänen (yellow card) 41'; Redes (yellow card) 46' (yellow-red card) 54'; Valencia (yellow card) 63'	Report	Lletget (yellow card) 24'; Pomykal (yellow card) 42'; Ntsabeleng (yellow card) 83'; Ferreira 89', (yellow card) 90'	Stadium: Q2 Stadium; Attendance: 20,738; Referee: Ismail Elfath

May 17, 2023 12	Seattle Sounders FC	1–2	Austin FC	Seattle, Washington
9:30 p.m. (CDT)	Montero 79'	Report	Finlay 36'; Zardes 57'; Pereira (yellow card) 74'; Bruin (yellow card) 90+1'	Stadium: Lumen Field; Attendance: 30,026; Referee: Rosendo Mendoza

May 20, 2023 13	Austin FC	1–0	Toronto FC	Austin, Texas
7:30 p.m. (CDT)	Pereira (yellow card) 28'; Finlay (yellow card) 37'; Ring (yellow card) 75'; Djeffal (yellow card) 79'; Zardes 90+1'	Report	Servania (yellow card) 35'; Franklin (yellow card) 54'; Kaye (yellow card) 71'	Stadium: Q2 Stadium; Attendance: 20,738; Referee: Ismir Pekmic

May 27, 2022 14 Copa Tejas	Houston Dynamo FC	2–1	Austin FC	Houston, Texas
7:30 p.m. (CDT)	Herrera 37'; Quiñónes (yellow card) 67'; Franco 87'; Micael (yellow card) 90+3'	Report	Zardes 22'; Cascante (yellow card) 30'	Stadium: Shell Energy Stadium; Attendance: 16,055; Referee: Ted Unkel

May 31, 2023 15	Austin FC	2–1	Minnesota United FC	Austin, Texas
7:30 p.m. (CDT)	Gallagher 19', (yellow card) 90'; Driussi 82'	Report	Rosales 26'	Stadium: Q2 Stadium; Attendance: 20,738; Referee: Fotis Bazakos

June 3, 2023 16	Austin FC	1–2	Real Salt Lake	Austin, Texas
7:30 p.m. (CDT)	Rigoni (yellow card) 43'; Urruti (yellow card) 62'; Gallagher (yellow card) 64'; Cascante 90+2'	Report	Hidalgo (yellow card) 7'; Rubín 15', 81'; Glad (yellow card) 34'; Löffelsend (yellow card) 66'	Stadium: Q2 Stadium; Attendance: 20,738; Referee: Tori Penso

June 10, 2023 17	Sporting Kansas City	4–1	Austin FC	Kansas City, Kansas
7:30 p.m. (CDT)	Pulido 19', 57'; Castellanos 47'; Radoja (yellow card) 61'; Thommy (yellow card) 87'; Shelton 89'	Report	Cascante (yellow card) 52'; Zardes (yellow card) 60'; Driussi 61'	Stadium: Children's Mercy Park; Attendance: 18,885; Referee: Marcos de Oliveira

June 21, 2023 18 Copa Tejas	Austin FC	3–0	FC Dallas	Austin, Texas
7:30 p.m. (CDT)	Finlay 17'; Fagundez 42'; Zardes 58'	Report	Quignon (yellow card) 25'	Stadium: Q2 Stadium; Attendance: 20,738; Referee: Rosendo Mendoza

June 24, 2023 19 Copa Tejas	Austin FC	3–0	Houston Dynamo FC	Austin, Texas
7:30 p.m. (CDT)	Finlay 22'; Zardes 32'; Gallagher (yellow card) 39'; Wolff (yellow card) 45'; Cascante 50', (yellow card) 77'; Pereira (yellow card) 68'; Lima (yellow card) 75'	Report	Sviatchenko (yellow card) 31'; Artur (yellow card) 45+5'; Herrera (yellow card) 77'	Stadium: Q2 Stadium; Attendance: 20,738; Referee: Victor Rivas

July 1, 2023 20	Inter Miami CF	1–1	Austin FC	Fort Lauderdale, Florida
6:30 p.m. (CDT)	Taylor (yellow card) 45+2'; Martínez 47'; Ruiz (yellow card) 54'; Fray (yellow card) 67'; Allen (yellow card) 72'; Campana (yellow card) 90+9'	Report	Lima 51', (yellow card) 90+9'	Stadium: DRV PNK Stadium; Attendance: 17,053; Referee: Filip Dujic

July 8, 2023 21	Minnesota United FC	1–4	Austin FC	St. Paul, Minnesota
7:30 p.m. (CDT)	Dotson (yellow card) 54'; Padelford 85'	Report	Fagúndez 35'; Driussi 45', 51'; Pereira (yellow card) 81'; Rigoni 90+5'	Stadium: Allianz Field; Attendance: 19,913; Referee: Alex Chilowicz

July 12, 2023 22	Vancouver Whitecaps FC	2–1	Austin FC	Vancouver, British Columbia, Canada
9:30 p.m. (CDT)	Vite 1'; Córdova 72'; Cubas (yellow card) 87'; Blackmon (yellow card) 90+10'	Report	Redes 47', (yellow card) 52'; Lundkvist (yellow card) 78'	Stadium: BC Place; Attendance: 14,995; Referee: Nima Saghafi

July 15, 2023 23	Austin FC	2–1	Sporting Kansas City	Austin, Texas
7:30 p.m. (CDT)	Zardes 17'; Finlay 19'; Cascante (yellow card) 59'	Report	Fontàs (yellow card) 8'; Rosero 33'; Davis (yellow card) 53'	Stadium: Q2 Stadium; Attendance: 20,738; Referee: Ted Unkel

August 20, 2023 24	St. Louis City SC	6–3	Austin FC	St. Louis, Missouri
8:30 p.m. (CDT)	Blom (yellow card) 17'; Parker 22'; Gioacchini 45+2', 50'; Adeniran 72', 90+5'; Ostrák 88'	Report	Driussi 61' (pen.); Bruin 87'; Rigoni 90+1'	Stadium: Citypark; Attendance: 22,423; Referee: Timothy Ford

August 26, 2023 25 Copa Tejas	FC Dallas	1–0	Austin FC	Frisco, Texas
7:30 p.m. (CDT)	Arriola (yellow card) 13'; Farfan (yellow card) 27'; Jiménez (yellow card) 56'; Illarramendi (yellow card) 74'; Tafari 90+7'	Report	Pereira (yellow card) 45' (yellow-red card) 67'	Stadium: Toyota Stadium; Attendance: 18,267; Referee: Rubiel Vazquez

August 30, 2023 26	Austin FC	1–2	Seattle Sounders FC	Austin, Texas
7:30 p.m. (CDT)	Zardes (yellow card) 46'; Valencia (yellow card) 53'; Driussi 72'	Report	Ragen (yellow card) 37'; Morris 48'; Nouhou (yellow card) 87'; Rusnák 90'	Stadium: Q2 Stadium; Attendance: 20,738; Referee: Drew Fischer

September 2, 2023 27	New England Revolution	2–2	Austin FC	Foxborough, Massachusetts
6:30 p.m. (CDT)	Rigoni 27'; Valencia (yellow card) 70'; Pereira (yellow card) 77'; Finlay (yellow card) 90'; Ring 90+4'	Report	Chancalay 28', 47', (yellow card) 54'; Kaye (yellow card) 57'	Stadium: Gillette Stadium; Attendance: 26,213; Referee: Marcos de Oliveira

September 17, 2023 28	Austin FC	1–2	Portland Timbers	Austin, Texas
7:30 p.m. (CDT)	Wolff (yellow card) 57'; Cascante (yellow card) 61'; Driussi 75'	Report	Mora 39'; Evander 64'; Antony (yellow card) 90+7'	Stadium: Q2 Stadium; Attendance: 20,738; Referee: Armando Villarreal

September 20, 2023 29	New York Red Bulls	1–1	Austin FC	Harrison, New Jersey
6:30 p.m. (CDT)	Rigoni 7' (o.g.); Edelman (yellow card) 8'; Yearwood (yellow card) 61'	Report	Driussi 44'; Urruti (yellow card) 82'; Lima (yellow card) 84'	Stadium: Red Bull Arena; Attendance: 13,562; Referee: Nima Saghafi

September 24, 2023 30	Austin FC	3–3	LA Galaxy	Austin, Texas
11:30 p.m. (CDT)	Gallagher (yellow card) 3'; Ring 11'; Väisänen (yellow card) 30'; Finlay 45+6'; Rigoni 75'	Report	Puig 45+2' (pen.); Cerrillo (yellow card) 84'; Joveljić 89'; Barrios 90+4'	Stadium: Q2 Stadium; Attendance: 20,738; Referee: Ted Unkel
Note: Match delayed from 7:30 p.m. due to weather conditions

September 30, 2023 31	Colorado Rapids	1–0	Austin FC	Commerce City, Colorado
8:30 p.m. (CDT)	Bombito (yellow card) 32'; Maxsø 41'; Yapi (yellow card) 76'	Report	Bruin (yellow card) 88'; Rigoni (yellow card) 90+1'	Stadium: Dick's Sporting Goods Park; Attendance: 15,931; Referee: Mark Allatin

October 4, 2023 32	Austin FC	3–0	D.C. United	Austin, Texas
7:30 p.m. (CDT)	Bruin 11'; Driussi 21'; Hedges 64'	Report	Klich (yellow card) 82'	Stadium: Q2 Stadium; Attendance: 20,738; Referee: Jair Marrufo

October 7, 2023 33	Austin FC	2–4	Los Angeles FC	Austin, Texas
7:30 p.m. (CDT)	Rigoni (yellow card) 51'; Väisänen 75'; Zardes (yellow card) 90'; Chiellini 90+4' (o.g.)	Report	Tillman 13'; Bouanga 45+1' (pen.), 54'; Olivera 68'	Stadium: Q2 Stadium; Attendance: 20,738; Referee: Jon Freemon

October 21, 2023 34 Decision Day	San Jose Earthquakes	1–1	Austin FC	San Jose, California
8:00 p.m. (CDT)	Espinoza 17', (yellow card) 72'; Tsakiris (yellow card) 22'	Report	Wolff 32'; Valencia (yellow card) 66'	Stadium: PayPal Park; Attendance: 18,000; Referee: Rosendo Mendoza

=== CONCACAF Champions League ===
March 7, 2023 Round of 16	Violette AC (Haiti)	3–0	(United States) Austin FC	Santiago de los Caballeros, Dominican Republic
5:00 p.m. (CST)	Chéry 13', 39'; Saba (yellow card) 32'; Tarek 47' (o.g.)	Report	Valencia (yellow card) 9'; Rigoni (yellow card) 59'; Djeffal (yellow card) 81'	Stadium: Estadio Cibao FC; Referee: Selvin Brown (Honduras)

March 14, 2023 Round of 16	Austin FC (United States)	2–0 (2–3 agg.)	(Haiti) Violette AC	Austin, Texas
7:00 p.m. (CDT)	Driussi 51', 63'	Report	Fédé (yellow card) 14'; Germain (yellow card) 87'; San Millán (yellow card) 90+1'	Stadium: Q2 Stadium; Attendance: 20,738; Referee: Oshane Nation
Note: Violette advance 3–2 on aggregate.

=== U.S. Open Cup ===
May 10, 2023 Round of 32	Austin FC (Texas)	2–0	New Mexico United	Austin, Texas
8:00 PM CDT	Redes 24'; Urruti 36'	Report		Stadium: Q2 Stadium; Attendance: 20,019; Referee: Elton Garcia

May 24, 2023 Round of 16	Austin FC (Texas)	0–2	(Illinois) Chicago Fire FC	Austin, Texas
8:00 PM CDT	Radovanović (yellow card) 62'; Ring (yellow card) 89'	Report	Czichos 27'; Pineda (yellow card) 48'; Przybyłko 77'	Stadium: Q2 Stadium; Attendance: 19,402; Referee: Alex Chilowicz

=== Leagues Cup ===
==== South 1 ====
Pos	Team	Pld	W	PW	PL	L	GF	GA	GD	Pts	Qualification	MAZ	JUA	AUS
1	(Mexico) Mazatlán	2	1	1	0	0	4	2	+2	5	Advance to knockout stage	—	1–1	—
2	(Mexico) Juárez	2	1	0	1	0	4	2	+2	4	Advance to knockout stage	—	—	—
3	(United States) Austin FC	2	0	0	0	2	2	6	−4	0		1–3	1–3	—

Source: Leagues Cup
Rules for classification: Tiebreakers

July 21, 2023 Group Stage	Austin FC (United States)	1–3	(Mexico) Mazatlan	Austin, Texas
7:30 p.m. (CDT)	Valencia (yellow card) 14'; Fagúndez 65' (pen.)	Report	Colmán 49'; Montaño 67'; Bello 88'	Stadium: Q2 Stadium; Attendance: 20,738; Referee: Randy Encarnación Solano

July 29, 2023 Group Stage	Austin FC (United States)	1–3	(Mexico) FC Juárez	Austin, Texas
7:30 p.m. (CDT)	Finlay 23'; Keller (yellow card) 42'; Pereira (yellow card) 72'	Report	J. García (yellow card) 5'; A. García (yellow card) 10', (goal) 62', 69'; Saucedo 35'; Salas (yellow card) 90'	Stadium: Q2 Stadium; Attendance: 20,738; Referee: Ismael Rosario López

== Statistics ==
=== Appearances and goals ===
Numbers after plus–sign (+) denote appearances as a substitute.

No.	Pos	Nat	Player	Total		MLS		MLS Cup		U.S. Open Cup		Continental (Note: Appearance(s) in 2023 CONCACAF Champions League)		Other (Note: Appearance(s) in 2023 Leagues Cup)	
No.	Pos	Nat	Player	Apps	Goals	Apps	Goals	Apps	Goals	Apps	Goals	Apps	Goals	Apps	Goals
1	GK	(United States) USA	Brad Stuver	40	0	34+0	0	0+0	0	2+0	0	2+0	0	2+0	0
2	DF	(United States) USA	Matt Hedges	7	1	3+3	1	0+0	0	0+0	0	0+0	0	0+1	0
3	DF	(Egypt) EGY	Amro Tarek	1	0	0+0	0	0+0	0	0+0	0	1+0	0	0+0	0
4	DF	(United States) USA	Kipp Keller	10	0	3+4	0	0+0	0	0+0	0	0+1	0	2+0	0
5	MF	(Colombia) COL	Jhojan Valencia	31	0	16+11	0	0+0	0	2+0	0	1+0	0	1+0	0
6	MF	(Venezuela) VEN	Daniel Pereira	36	0	29+3	0	0+0	0	2+0	0	1+0	0	1+0	0
7	FW	(Argentina) ARG	Emiliano Rigoni	37	5	25+8	5	0+0	0	2+0	0	1+1	0	0+0	0
8	MF	(Finland) FIN	Alexander Ring	32	2	25+3	2	0+0	0	2+0	0	1+0	0	0+1	0
9	FW	(United States) USA	Gyasi Zardes	31	6	17+11	6	0+0	0	1+0	0	1+0	0	1+0	0
10	MF	(Argentina) ARG	Sebastián Driussi	30	13	26+2	11	0+0	0	0+0	0	1+0	2	1+0	0
11	FW	(Paraguay) PAR	Rodney Redes	16	2	5+6	1	0+0	0	2+0	1	1+0	0	2+0	0
12	GK	(United States) USA	Damian Las	0	0	0+0	0	0+0	0	0+0	0	0+0	0	0+0	0
13	MF	(United States) USA	Ethan Finlay	40	6	20+14	5	0+0	0	0+2	0	2+0	0	2+0	1
14	MF	(Uruguay) URU	Diego Fagúndez	24	3	14+5	2	0+0	0	0+1	0	1+1	0	2+0	1
15	DF	(Finland) FIN	Leo Väisänen	24	1	20+1	1	0+0	0	2+0	0	1+0	0	0+0	0
16	DF	(United States) USA	Hector Jiménez	5	0	1+1	0	0+0	0	1+0	0	1+0	0	0+1	0
17	FW	(Republic of Ireland) IRL	Jon Gallagher	40	5	31+3	5	0+0	0	1+1	0	1+1	0	1+1	0
18	DF	(Costa Rica) CRC	Julio Cascante	28	2	24+0	2	0+0	0	1+1	0	0+0	0	2+0	0
19	MF	(United States) USA	CJ Fodrey	4	0	0+3	0	0+0	0	0+0	0	0+0	0	0+1	0
20	GK	(United States) USA	Matt Bersano	0	0	0+0	0	0+0	0	0+0	0	0+0	0	0+0	0
21	DF	(Sweden) SWE	Adam Lundqvist	28	1	8+15	0	0+0	0	2+0	0	1+1	1	1+0	0
22	MF	(France) FRA	Sofiane Djeffal	10	0	3+4	0	0+0	0	0+2	0	1+0	0	0+0	0
23	DF	(Slovenia) SLO	Žan Kolmanič	7	0	6+0	0	0+0	0	0+0	0	1+0	0	0+0	0
24	DF	(United States) USA	Nick Lima	39	1	25+8	1	0+0	0	1+1	0	1+1	0	2+0	0
26	DF	(United States) USA	Charlie Asensio	0	0	0+0	0	0+0	0	0+0	0	0+0	0	0+0	0
27	DF	(United States) USA	Brandan Craig	0	0	0+0	0	0+0	0	0+0	0	0+0	0	0+0	0
28	MF	(United States) USA	Alfonso Ocampo-Chavez	0	0	0+0	0	0+0	0	0+0	0	0+0	0	0+0	0
29	FW	(United States) USA	Will Bruin	22	3	2+17	3	0+0	0	0+0	0	1+0	0	0+2	0
30	MF	(United States) USA	Memo Rodríguez	9	0	2+7	0	0+0	0	0+0	0	0+0	0	0+0	0
31	MF	(France) FRA	Valentin Noël	1	0	0+0	0	0+0	0	0+0	0	0+0	0	0+1	0
32	MF	(United States) USA	David Rodríguez	0	0	0+0	0	0+0	0	0+0	0	0+0	0	0+0	0
33	MF	(United States) USA	Owen Wolff	31	2	21+6	2	0+0	0	0+0	0	1+1	0	2+0	0
37	FW	(Argentina) ARG	Maximiliano Urruti	28	2	10+15	1	0+0	0	1+0	1	1+0	0	0+1	0
66	DF	(Serbia) SRB	Aleksandar Radovanović	9	0	4+3	0	0+0	0	0+2	0	0+0	0	0+0	0
	DF	(United States) USA	Joe Hafferty	0	0	0+0	0	0+0	0	0+0	0	0+0	0	0+0	0

- Last updated: October 21, 2023
- Source: https://www.austinfc.com/stats/

=== Top scorers ===
Rank	Position	Number	Name	MLS	MLS Cup	U.S. Open Cup	Continental (Note: Appearance(s) in CONCACAF Champions League)	Other (Note: Appearance(s) in Leagues Cup)	Total
1	MF	10	(Argentina) Sebastián Driussi	11	0	0	2	0	13
2	FW	9	(United States) Gyasi Zardes	6	0	0	0	0	6
2	MF	13	(United States) Ethan Finlay	5	0	0	0	1	6
4	DF	17	(Republic of Ireland) Jon Gallagher	5	0	0	0	0	5
4	MF	7	(Argentina) Emiliano Rigoni	5	0	0	0	0	5
6	MF	14	(Uruguay) Diego Fagúndez	2	0	0	0	1	3
6	FW	29	(United States) Will Bruin	3	0	0	0	0	3
8	MF	8	(Finland) Alexander Ring	2	0	0	0	0	2
8	FW	11	(United States) Rodney Redes	1	0	1	0	0	2
8	DF	18	(Costa Rica) Julio Cascante	2	0	0	0	0	2
8	MF	33	(United States) Owen Wolff	2	0	0	0	0	2
8	FW	37	(Argentina) Maximiliano Urruti	1	0	1	0	0	2
13	DF	2	(United States) Matt Hedges	1	0	0	0	0	1
13	DF	15	(Finland) Leo Väisänen	1	0	0	0	0	1
13	DF	24	(United States) Nick Lima	1	0	0	0	0	1
Total				47	0	2	2	2	53

- Last updated: October 21, 2023
- Source: https://www.austinfc.com/stats/

=== Top assists ===
Rank	Position	Number	Name	MLS	MLS Cup	U.S. Open Cup	Continental (Note: Appearance(s) in CONCACAF Champions League)	Other (Note: Appearance(s) in Leagues Cup)	Total
1	DF	17	(Republic of Ireland) Jon Gallagher	8	0	0	0	0	8
1	MF	6	(Venezuela) Daniel Pereira	8	0	0	0	0	8
3	MF	7	(Argentina) Emiliano Rigoni	5	0	1	1	0	7
4	MF	10	(Argentina) Sebastián Driussi	5	0	0	1	0	6
5	MF	8	(Finland) Alexander Ring	4	0	0	1	0	5
6	MF	13	(United States) Ethan Finlay	4	0	0	0	0	4
6	DF	18	(Costa Rica) Julio Cascante	4	0	0	0	0	4
6	DF	24	(United States) Nick Lima	4	0	0	0	0	4
6	MF	33	(United States) Owen Wolff	3	0	0	0	1	4
9	MF	5	(Colombia) Jhojan Valencia	3	0	0	0	0	3
9	DF	21	(Sweden) Adam Lundqvist	2	0	1	0	0	3
10	FW	9	(United States) Gyasi Zardes	2	0	0	0	0	2
10	MF	14	(Uruguay) Diego Fagúndez	2	0	0	0	0	2
13	FW	11	(Paraguay) Rodney Redes	1	0	0	0	0	1
13	DF	15	(Finland) Leo Väisänen	1	0	0	0	0	1
13	MF	22	(France) Sofiane Djeffal	1	0	0	0	0	1
13	FW	29	(United States) Will Bruin	1	0	0	0	0	1
Total				55	0	2	3	1	61

- Last updated: October 21, 2023
- Source: https://www.austinfc.com/stats/

=== Disciplinary record ===
No.	Pos.	Player	MLS			National Cup			Continental (Note: Appearance(s) in CONCACAF Champions League)			Other (Note: Appearance(s) in Leagues Cup)			Total		
No.	Pos.	Player	Yellow card	(yellow card) (yellow-red card)	Red card	Yellow card	(yellow card) (yellow-red card)	Red card	Yellow card	(yellow card) (yellow-red card)	Red card	Yellow card	(yellow card) (yellow-red card)	Red card	Yellow card	(yellow card) (yellow-red card)	Red card
1	GK	(United States) Brad Stuver	0	0	0	0	0	0	0	0	0	0	0	0	0	0	0
2	DF	(United States) Matt Hedges	0	0	0	0	0	0	0	0	0	0	0	0	0	0	0
3	DF	(Egypt) Amro Tarek	0	0	0	0	0	0	0	0	0	0	0	0	0	0	0
4	CB	(United States) Kipp Keller	0	0	0	0	0	0	0	0	0	1	0	0	1	0	0
5	MF	(Colombia) Jhojan Valencia	4	0	0	0	0	0	1	0	0	1	0	0	6	0	0
6	MF	(Venezuela) Daniel Pereira	7	1	0	0	0	0	0	0	0	1	0	0	8	1	0
7	FW	(Argentina) Emiliano Rigoni	3	0	0	0	0	0	1	0	0	0	0	0	4	0	0
8	MF	(Finland) Alexander Ring	3	0	0	1	0	0	0	0	0	0	0	0	4	0	0
9	FW	(United States) Gyasi Zardes	3	0	0	0	0	0	0	0	0	0	0	0	3	0	0
10	MF	(Argentina) Sebastián Driussi	1	0	0	0	0	0	0	0	0	0	0	0	1	0	0
11	FW	(Paraguay) Rodney Redes	1	1	0	0	0	0	0	0	0	0	0	0	1	1	0
12	GK	(Paraguay) Damian Las	0	0	0	0	0	0	0	0	0	0	0	0	0	0	0
13	MF	(United States) Ethan Finlay	2	0	0	0	0	0	0	0	0	0	0	0	2	0	0
14	MF	(Uruguay) Diego Fagúndez	2	0	0	0	0	0	0	0	0	0	0	0	2	0	0
15	DF	(Finland) Leo Väisänen	3	0	0	0	0	0	0	0	0	0	0	0	3	0	0
16	CB	(United States) Hector Jiménez	0	0	0	0	0	0	0	0	0	0	0	0	0	0	0
17	DF	(Republic of Ireland) Jon Gallagher	4	0	0	0	0	0	0	0	0	0	0	0	4	0	0
18	CB	(Costa Rica) Julio Cascante	5	0	0	0	0	0	0	0	0	0	0	0	5	0	0
19	MF	(United States) CJ Fodrey	0	0	0	0	0	0	0	0	0	0	0	0	0	0	0
20	GK	(United States) Matt Bersano	0	0	0	0	0	0	0	0	0	0	0	0	0	0	0
21	LB	(United States) Adam Lundqvist	2	0	0	0	0	0	0	0	0	0	0	0	2	0	0
22	MF	(France) Sofiane Djeffal	1	0	0	0	0	0	1	0	0	0	0	0	2	0	0
23	LB	(Slovenia) Žan Kolmanič	0	0	0	0	0	0	0	0	0	0	0	0	0	0	0
24	RB	(United States) Nick Lima	5	0	0	0	0	0	0	0	0	0	0	0	5	0	0
26	RB	(United States) Charlie Asensio	0	0	0	0	0	0	0	0	0	0	0	0	0	0	0
27	RB	(United States) Brandan Craig	0	0	0	0	0	0	0	0	0	0	0	0	0	0	0
28	FW	(United States) Alfonso Ocampo-Chavez	0	0	0	0	0	0	0	0	0	0	0	0	0	0	0
29	FW	(United States) Will Bruin	2	0	0	0	0	0	0	0	0	0	0	0	2	0	0
30	MF	(United States) Memo Rodríguez	0	0	0	0	0	0	0	0	0	0	0	0	0	0	0
31	MF	(France) Valentin Noël	0	0	0	0	0	0	0	0	0	0	0	0	0	0	0
32	MF	(United States) David Rodríguez	0	0	0	0	0	0	0	0	0	0	0	0	0	0	0
33	MF	(United States) Owen Wolff	2	0	0	0	0	0	0	0	0	0	0	0	2	0	0
37	FW	(Argentina) Maximiliano Urruti	3	0	0	0	0	0	0	0	0	0	0	0	3	0	0
66	DF	(Serbia) Aleksandar Radovanović	0	0	0	1	0	0	0	0	0	0	0	0	1	0	0
	DF	(United States) Joe Hafferty	0	0	0	0	0	0	0	0	0	0	0	0	0	0	0
Total			50	2	0	2	0	0	3	0	0	3	0	0	58	2	0

- Last updated: October 21, 2023
- Source: https://www.austinfc.com/stats/

=== Clean sheets ===
Rank	Number	Name	MLS	Playoffs	CCL	U.S. Open Cup	Leagues Cup	Total
1	1	(United States) Brad Stuver	6	0	1	1	0	8

- Last updated: October 21, 2023
- Source: https://www.austinfc.com/stats/

== Awards and honors ==
=== MLS All Star Team ===
Award	Awardee	Position	Ref
MLS All-Star Team	(Republic of Ireland) Jon Gallagher	DF	

=== End-of-season awards ===
Award	Winner	Ref
Defensive Player of the Year	(Finland) Alexander Ring	
Offensive Player of the Year	(Argentina) Sebastián Driussi (Note: Second year in a row)	

=== CONCACAF Champions League Bext XI ===
Round	Leg	Player	Opponent	Ref
Round of 16	2	(Argentina) Sebastián Driussi	Violette AC	

=== MLS Team of the Matchday ===
Matchday	Player	Opponent	Position	Ref
2	(Finland) Alexander Ring	CF Montréal	DF	
2	(Argentina) Maximiliano Urruti	CF Montréal	Bench	
3	(United States) Owen Wolff	Real Salt Lake	MF	
3	(Republic of Ireland) Jon Gallagher	Real Salt Lake	Bench	
5	(United States) Brad Stuver	Colorado Rapids	GK	
11	(United States) Owen Wolff (2)	Portland Timbers	Bench	
13	(United States) Ethan Finlay	Seattle Sounders FC	FW	
13	(United States) Josh Wolff	Seattle Sounders FC	Coach	
14	(United States) Gyasi Zardes	Toronto FC	Bench	
15	(United States) Gyasi Zardes (2)	Houston Dynamo	Bench	
16	(Costa Rica) Julio Cascante	Minnesota United FC	DF	
16	(United States) Brad Stuver (2)	Minnesota United FC	Bench	
20	(Costa Rica) Julio Cascante (2)	FC Dallas	DF	
20	(United States) Brad Stuver (3)	FC Dallas	Bench	
20	(Uruguay) Diego Fagúndez	FC Dallas	Bench	
21	(Costa Rica) Julio Cascante (3)	Houston Dynamo FC	DF	
22	(United States) Brad Stuver (4)	Inter Miami CF	GK	
24	(Argentina) Sebastián Driussi	Minnesota United FC	MF	
26	(United States) Ethan Finlay (2)	Sporting Kansas City	Bench	
30	(Finland) Alexander Ring (2)	New England Revolution	Bench	
36	(United States) Brad Stuver (5)	DC United	Goalkeeper	
36	(Argentina) Sebastian Driussi (2)	DC United	Bench	

=== MLS Goal of the Matchday ===
Matchday	Player	Opponent	Ref
3	(Republic of Ireland) Jon Gallagher	Real Salt Lake	
