= Brad Stuver =

American soccer player (born 1991)

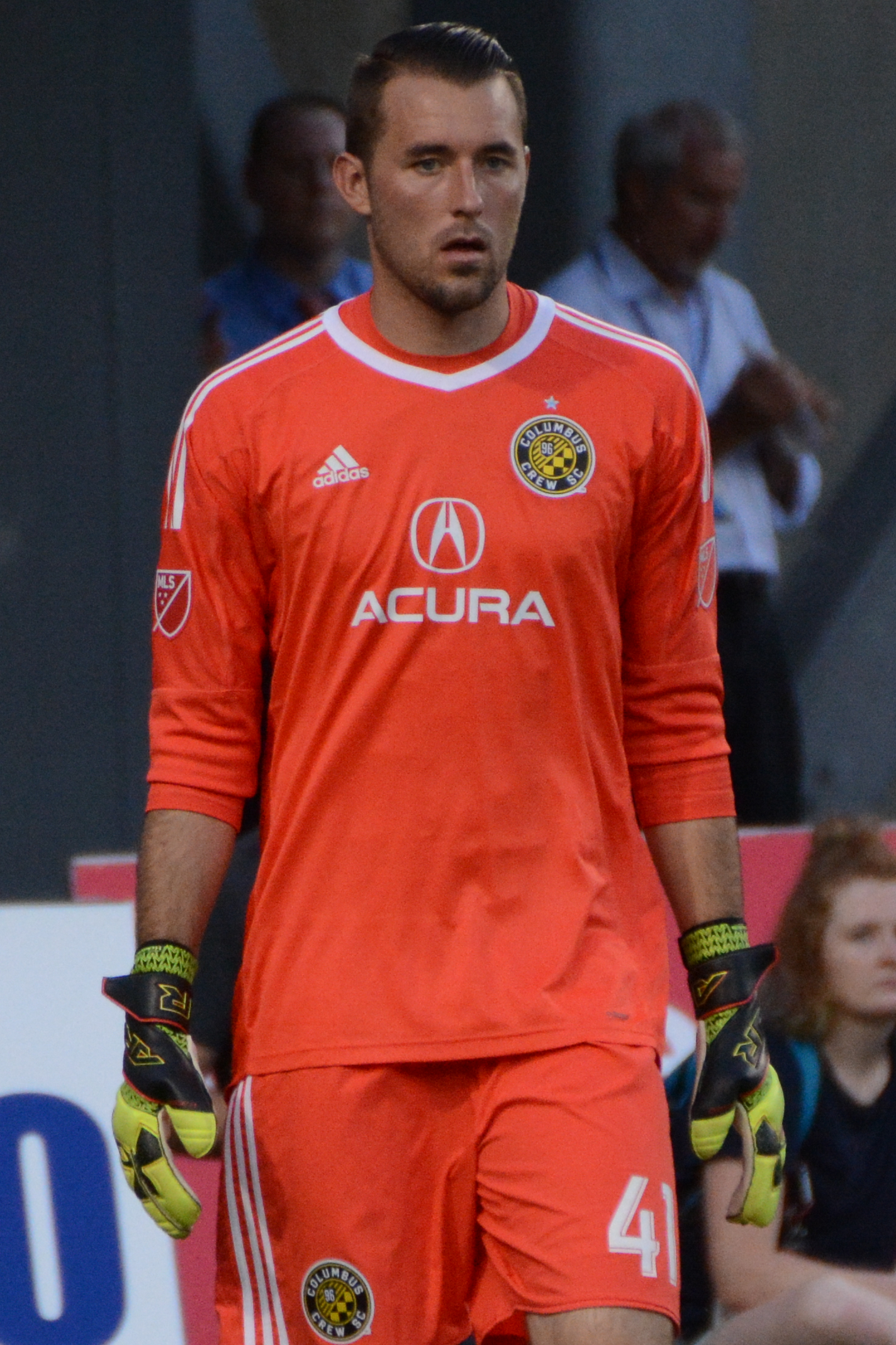
- Stuver with Columbus Crew in 2017

Personal information
- Full name: Bradley Stuver
- Date of birth: April 16, 1991 (age 35)
- Place of birth: Mayfield, Ohio, U.S.
- Height: 6 ft 3 in (1.91 m)
- Position: Goalkeeper

Team information
- Current team: Austin FC
- Number: 1

Youth career
- Cleveland Force

College career
Years	Team	Apps	(Gls)
2009–2012	Cleveland State Vikings	71	(0)

Senior career*
Years	Team	Apps	(Gls)
2010	Cleveland Internationals	9	(0)
2011	Akron Summit Assault	8	(0)
2013	MLS Pool		
2013	→ Chivas USA (loan)	0	(0)
2013	→ New England Revolution (loan)	0	(0)
2013	→ Columbus Crew (loan)	0	(0)
2013	→ Real Salt Lake (loan)	0	(0)
2014–2017	Columbus Crew SC	2	(0)
2014	→ Dayton Dutch Lions (loan)	1	(0)
2014	→ Wilmington Hammerheads FC (loan)	10	(0)
2018–2020	New York City FC	7	(0)
2021–	Austin FC	195	(0)
- * Club domestic league appearances and goals as of 19:13, November 8, 2026 (UTC)

Bradley Stuver (born April 16, 1991) is an American professional soccer player who plays as a goalkeeper for Major League Soccer club Austin FC.

== Youth and college ==
Born in Mayfield, Ohio, Stuver attended Twinsburg High School in Twinsburg, Ohio. He played soccer all four years for the Tigers, appearing as a goalkeeper and midfielder. As a senior, he was named to the 2008 Plain Dealer All-State team and was named First Team All-Ohio by the OSSCA. He finished his prep career having kept 24 shutouts, and tallied 12 goals and three assists out of the midfield.

Stuver played college soccer for the Vikings of Cleveland State University. His freshman season overlapped with the senior season of Josh Williams, who Stuver would later be teammates with at Columbus Crew SC. He started the season as the backup keeper behind Nick Harpel, but became the number one goalkeeper by the end of the season. He made his collegiate debut on September 5, 2009, against Santa Clara, making four saves in a 3–2 defeat at the UC Irvine College Classic. Stuver would finish the season with four clean sheets in 14 appearances, starting 10 matches. His .817 save percentage led the team, and the 10 saves he tallied in a 0–0 double overtime draw at Milwaukee were tied for the most in the league in a single game. Stuver took over the starting job full-time as a sophomore, starting 19 of 20 games in 2010. He kept three shutouts, including holding No. 6 Butler to a 0–0 draw on November 5. He was named as the Horizon League Goalkeeper of the Year and named to the All-HL First Team Stuver also earned three Horizon League Player of the Week nods, most of any player in the conference.

Stuver continued as the unquestioned starting goalkeeper his junior season, starting 18 games and keeping five clean sheets in 2011. He made 11 saves in a 2–1 victory over UIC, a performance good enough to earn him recognition as Horizon League Player of the Week. After finishing the season with 66 saves, Stuver was named to the All-Horizon League Second Team. As a senior in 2012, Stuver started all 20 games and was the only Vikings goalkeeper to play on the season. He kept nine shutouts in 20 games, while making 81 saves. He made six of those saves on October 3 versus Belmont, a performance that earned him recognition as the HL Defensive Player of the Week. For a second consecutive season, Stuver was named to the All-HL Second Team. He capped his career with a Horizon League Tournament title and a first career appearance in the NCAA Tournament. The Vikings were defeated in the First round, falling 2–1 to Michigan State to end Stuver's collegiate career. He finished his collegiate career with 71 appearances over four seasons.

=== Cleveland Internationals ===
After his sophomore season at Cleveland State, Stuver joined Cleveland Internationals in the USL PDL for the 2010 PDL season. The Internationals struggled to a last-place finish in the Great Lakes Division, finishing 2–2–12 with a -26 goal differential. At the end of the season, the Internationals folded after seven years of operation, but continued to exist as a youth club. Although Stuver split time with Anthony Ponikvar, he finished the season with nine appearances for Cleveland in the club's final season.

=== Akron Summit Assault ===
For a second consecutive offseason, Stuver appeared for a USL PDL club, signing on to expansion club Akron Summit Assault for the 2011 PDL season. Stuver started exactly half of the club's games, alternating time with Carl Contrasciere and Richard Ott. The Summit Assault finished the season at 5–3–8, 11 points outside the playoff positions in the Great Lakes Division. At the end of the season, the club folded for "undisclosed reasons". Stuver finished the season having made eight appearances for Akron in the franchise's lone season.

== Club career ==
After his senior season of college, Stuver was invited to the 2013 MLS Combine. He was the only Horizon League player selected to the combine, and was one of seven collegiate goalkeepers to earn a spot. On January 17, 2013, Stuver was drafted in the second round (32nd overall) of the 2013 MLS SuperDraft by Montreal Impact. He was the first goalkeeper chosen in the draft. However, he was not signed by the Impact, as the club instead chose to keep Maxime Crépeau, an academy graduate, as their third-string keeper.

Stuver was signed by MLS as a pool goalkeeper for the 2013 season, allowing him to be called up by any team in the league "in the event of an emergency." Although Stuver spent the majority of the season training with Columbus Crew, he made his first appearance on a MLS gameday roster with Chivas USA. Stuver sat behind Patrick McLain on May 12 as Chivas was defeated 3–0 by Portland Timbers. On September 14, he was on the bench for New England Revolution, serving as the backup to Bobby Shuttleworth as the Revolution were defeated 3–2 by Chicago Fire. A week later, Stuver served as the backup to Matt Lampson for Columbus for a 3–0 victory over Chicago. He also trained with Real Salt Lake, and appeared on the bench for their reserve side in the MLS Reserve League.

=== Columbus Crew SC ===
Stuver was selected by Columbus Crew in the 2013 MLS Waiver Draft. He was chosen with the fourth overall pick, and was one of just two players drafted, along with Paolo DelPiccolo. Stuver had previously made three appearances with Columbus' reserve team in the MLS Reserve League in 2013, appearing against the reserve sides of Houston Dynamo, FC Dallas and Chicago Fire over two months.

Stuver spent the entirety of the 2014 season on loan in USL Pro, with Dayton Dutch Lions and Wilmington Hammerheads FC. He did spend two months in Columbus while recovering from an arthroscopic surgery on his left ankle, but did not dress for the Crew during that span.

Stuver was promoted to the backup role for Columbus Crew SC to begin the 2015 season, jumping Matt Lampson on the depth chart. He made his debut for Crew SC in a friendly against Valencia CF on May 27, conceding a goal to Álvaro Negredo in the 33rd minute of a 1–0 defeat for Columbus. Stuver also started both U.S. Open Cup matches, a 3–1 victory against Richmond Kickers in the Fourth Round and a 2–0 defeat against MLS expansion side Orlando City SC in the Fifth Round.

In 2016, Stuver again made his season debut in an international friendly. He started on May 11 against Tiburones Rojos de Veracruz, making five saves as part of a 1–0 victory for Columbus. Stuver again started both cup matches, keeping a clean sheet against Tampa Bay Rowdies as part of a 4–0 victory in the Fourth Round, and conceding twice to David Accam in a 2–1 defeat against Chicago Fire in the Fifth Round. After starting keeper Steve Clark went down injured at the end of the season, Stuver made his MLS debut against the New York Red Bulls on October 16. He saved an early penalty kick from Sacha Kljestan, but gave up a brace to Bradley Wright-Phillips in a 3–2 defeat. Stuver also started the season finale away to New York City FC on October 23, but made just two saves in a 4–1 defeat for Crew SC.

Although Columbus declined the contract options for Matt Pacifici and previous starting goalkeeper Steve Clark, Stuver was passed for the starting job by Zack Steffen to begin the 2017 season. He missed time early in the season with a right elbow strain, although Steffen played every minute of the seven games Stuver was unavailable. He made his season debut on June 14, in the Fourth Round of the U.S. Open Cup against FC Cincinnati. Stuver made two saves, but conceded a 64th-minute goal to Djiby Fall as Crew SC were defeated 1–0 in the first-ever Hell is Real Derby. Stuver again went the full 90 minutes in a friendly for Columbus, keeping a clean sheet in a 1–0 victory over Eintracht Frankfurt on July 17. Stuver did not make an appearance the rest of the season, sitting behind Steffen throughout Columbus' run to the Eastern Conference Finals. He finished the season having made just the one official appearance, although he was on the bench for 31 of the club's 40 matches in all competitions.

On December 1, 2017, Crew SC declined Stuver's contract option, ending his four-year tenure with the club. During his time in Columbus, Stuver made seven appearances for Crew SC in official competition. He appeared just twice in league play.

==== Loan to Dayton Dutch Lions ====
On March 12, 2014, Stuver was sent on loan to Columbus' USL Pro affiliate club, Dayton Dutch Lions, one of five players sent to Dayton by the Crew. He made his league debut for the Dutch Lions on May 25 against Sacramento Republic FC, conceding goals to Dakota Collins and Octavio Guzmán in a 2–1 defeat. Stuver also appeared in two U.S. Open Cup matches for Dayton, a 2–0 victory in the Second Round over Schwaben AC and a 5–2 defeat in the third round against NASL expansion side Indy Eleven. He was recalled by Columbus in June to undergo an arthroscopic surgery on his left ankle.

==== Loan to Wilmington Hammerheads ====
After undergoing ankle surgery in June, Columbus announced on August 4, 2014, that Stuver would again be sent on loan, this time to Wilmington Hammerheads FC of USL Pro. He made his debut for Wilmington on August 9 against his former club, Dayton Dutch Lions, conceding goals to Joe Broekhuizen and Karamba Janneh in a 2–1 defeat. Stuver picked up his first win with the Hammerheads in his fourth start, coming August 23 away to Orange County Blues. He conceded to Jiovanni Santana but saw Ashani Fairclough score in the 90th minute to deliver a 2–1 victory for Wilmington. Stuver started 10 regular-season games with the Hammerheads, keeping three shutouts. He helped Wilmington make it to the first round of the USL Pro playoffs as the seventh seed, where they were defeated by eventual league champions Sacramento Republic FC, 4–1.

=== New York City FC ===
On December 14, 2017, Stuver was traded by Columbus to New York City FC in exchange for a fourth-round pick in the 2019 MLS SuperDraft.

=== Austin FC ===
On December 28, 2020, Stuver was acquired by Austin FC as a free agent. He made a career high 9 saves in Austin's match against Sporting Kansas City on June 12, 2021. He was named Defensive Player of the Year by the club

2022 was a busy year off the field for Stuver, who was recognized for his community support and activism by being nominated for the 2022 ESPY Muhammad Ali Sports Humanitarian Award. In addition to the honor by ESPN, Stuver was recognized by 4ATX Foundation as a Legend of the Year for his work with the Laundry Project. In Austin's first-ever playoff game, Stuver saved two out of the three unsuccessful Real Salt Lake penalties in a 3–1 shootout win (2–2 at 120 minutes).

During the 2025 season, Stuver was selected for the 2025 MLS All-Star Game.

== Coaching career ==
While still playing professionally, Stuver started coaching the goalkeepers for the Ohio Wesleyan Battling Bishops men's soccer program in 2015.

== Career statistics ==
As of match played November 1, 2026

Appearances and goals by club, season and competition
Club	Season	Division	League		League Cup		USOC		CCL		Other		Total	
Club	Season	Division	Apps	Goals	Apps	Goals	Apps	Goals	Apps	Goals	Apps	Goals	Apps	Goals
Cleveland Internationals	2010	PDL	9	0	—		—		—		—		9	0
Akron Summit Assault	2011	PDL	8	0	—		—		—		—		8	0
Columbus Crew	2013	MLS	0	0	—		—		—		—		0	0
Columbus Crew	2014	MLS	0	0	0	0	—		—		—		0	0
Columbus Crew	2015	MLS	0	0	0	0	2	0	—		—		2	0
Columbus Crew	2016	MLS	2	0	—		2	0	—		—		4	0
Columbus Crew	2017	MLS	0	0	0	0	1	0	—		—		1	0
Columbus Crew	Total		2	0	0	0	5	0	—		—		7	0
Dayton Dutch Lions (loan)	2014	USL Pro	1	0	—		2	0	—		—		3	0
Wilmington Hammerheads (loan)	2014	USL Pro	10	0	1 (Note: Appearance(s) in USL Pro playoffs)	0	0	0	—		—		11	0
New York City FC	2018	MLS	2	0	0	0	1	0	—		—		3	0
New York City FC	2019	MLS	5	0	—		3	0	—		—		8	0
New York City FC	2020	MLS	0	0	—		—		—		0	0	0	0
New York City FC	Total		7	0	0	0	6	0	—		0	0	11	0
Austin FC	2021	MLS	33	0	—		—		—		—		33	0
Austin FC	2022	MLS	31	0	3 (Note: Appearance(s) in MLS Cup Playoffs)	0	—		—		—		34	0
Austin FC	2023	MLS	34	0	—		2	0	2	0	2 (Note: Includes appearance(s) in Leagues Cup)	0	40	0
Austin FC	2024	MLS	34	0	—		—		—		2	0	36	0
Austin FC	2025	MLS	34	0	2	0	4	0	—		—		40	0
Austin FC	2026	MLS	29	0	0	0	0	0	—		4	0	33	0
Austin FC	Total		195	0	5	0	6	0	2	0	8	0	216	0
Career total			232	0	6	0	17	0	2	0	8	0	265	0

== Honors ==
Individual

- MLS All-Star: 2025
