= Emiliano Rigoni =

Argentine footballer (born 1993)

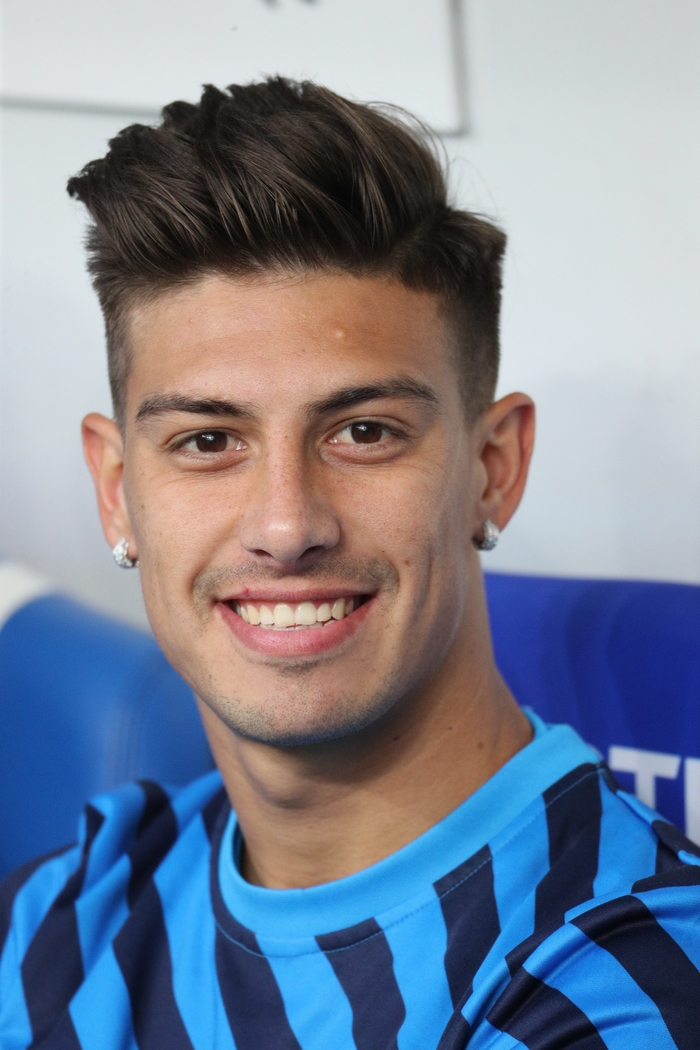
- Rigoni with Zenit Saint Petersburg in 2019

Personal information
- Full name: Emiliano Ariel Rigoni
- Date of birth: 4 February 1993 (age 33)
- Place of birth: Colonia Caroya, Argentina
- Height: 1.81 m (5 ft 11 in)
- Position: Winger

Team information
- Current team: Belgrano
- Number: 24

Youth career
- 2005–2013: Belgrano

Senior career*
Years	Team	Apps	(Gls)
2013–2016	Belgrano	73	(8)
2016–2017	Independiente	46	(15)
2017–2021	Zenit Saint Petersburg	47	(5)
2018	→ Atalanta (loan)	12	(3)
2019–2020	→ Sampdoria (loan)	8	(0)
2020–2021	→ Elche (loan)	22	(1)
2021–2022	São Paulo	53	(6)
2022–2024	Austin FC	51	(6)
2025	León	14	(1)
2025	→ São Paulo (loan)	10	(1)
2026–	Belgrano	17	(1)

International career^{‡}
2017	Argentina	2	(0)
Medal record
Independiente
First place	Copa Sudamericana	2017
- * Club domestic league appearances and goals as of 17:50, 9 July 2026 (UTC) ‡ National team caps and goals as of 14 November 2017

Emiliano Ariel Rigoni (Spanish pronunciation: [emiˈljano riˈɣoni]; born 4 February 1993) is an Argentine professional footballer who plays as a right winger for Belgrano.

== Club career ==
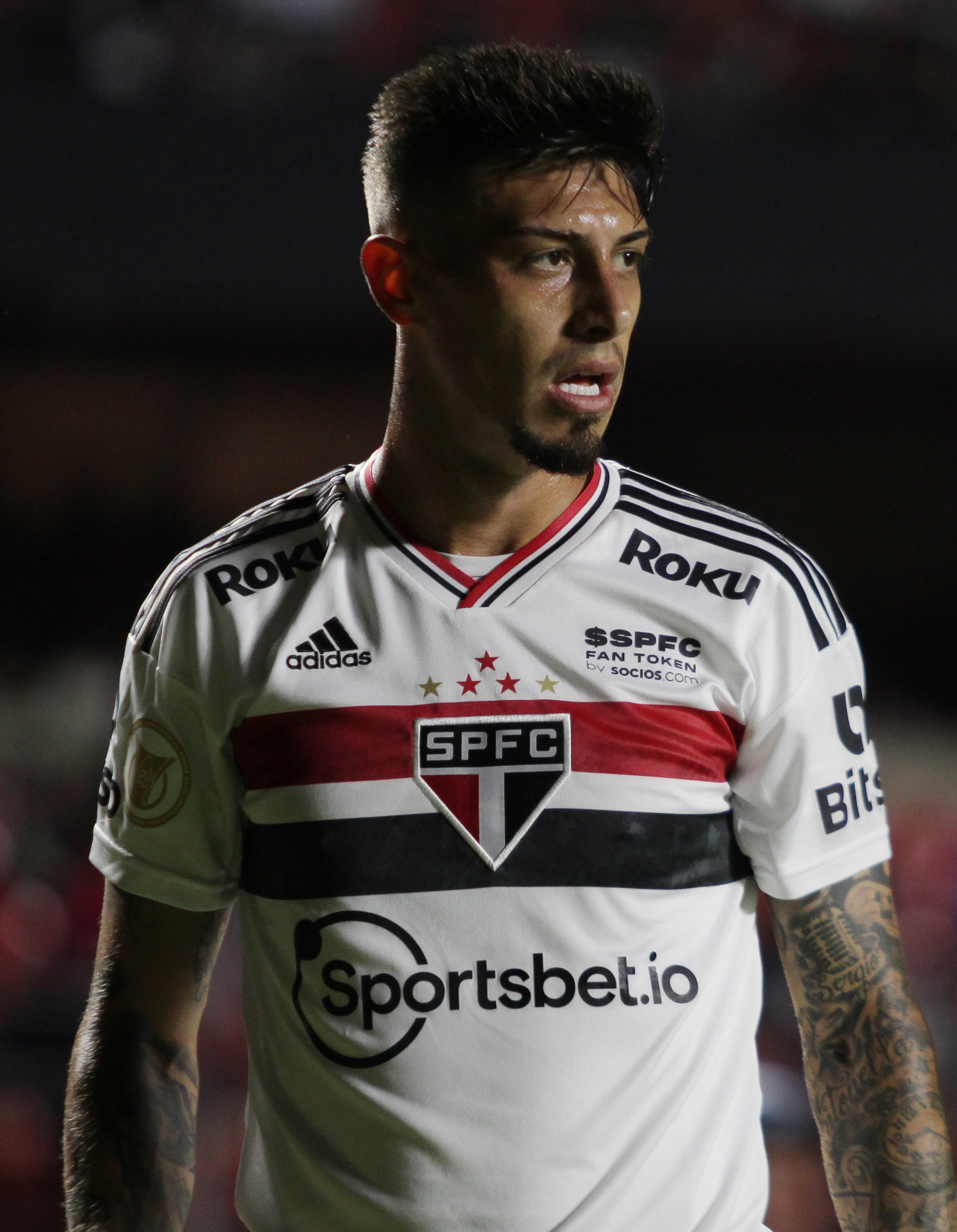
Rigoni with São Paulo in 2022

Rigoni is a youth exponent from Club Atlético Belgrano. He made his league debut on 4 August 2013 against CA Lanús in a 3–0 away defeat. In January 2016, he joined Club Atlético Independiente. He has scored in his debut for Independiente against his former club Belgrano.

On 23 August 2017, Rigoni moved to Russia, signing a four-year contract with FC Zenit Saint Petersburg.

On 19 October 2017, he scored the first hat-trick of his career in a 3–1 Europa League group win over Rosenborg BK.

On 17 August 2018, Zenit announced that Rigoni would join Serie A club Atalanta B.C. for the 2018–19 season, with Atalanta holding an option to make the transfer permanent at the end of the loan. On 14 January 2019, Rigoni returned to Zenit.

On 2 September 2019, Zenit announced that Rigoni would spend the rest of the 2019–20 on loan to Italian club U.C. Sampdoria, with Sampdoria holding an option to purchase his rights at the end of the loan. On 1 February 2020, Sampdoria terminated the loan early.

On 1 July 2020, he scored a late winner in Zenit's 2–1 away victory against FC Tambov. On 5 October, deadline day, he moved to La Liga side Elche via one-year loan.

On 21 May 2021, Rigoni signed a three-year contract with Brazilian club São Paulo FC.

On 29 July 2022, Rigoni joined Major League Soccer club Austin FC on a deal until the end of the 2024 season. On 21 May 2024 Austin FC announced they had exercised their buyout option for Rigoni's contract, releasing him from the team.

On 3 January 2025, Rigoni joined Mexican club León on a free transfer. On September 2, he agreed to return on loan to São Paulo.

== International career ==
Rigoni made his debut for the Argentina national football team on 5 October 2017 in a 2018 World Cup qualifier against Peru.

== Personal life ==
Rigoni is of Italian descent and holds an Italian passport, which counts him as an EU player for European competitions.

== Career statistics ==
=== Club ===
As of 15 May 2024

Appearances and goals by club, season and competition
Club	Season	League			National cup (Note: Appearance(s) in Copa Argentina, Russian Cup, Coppa Italia, Copa del Rey, Copa do Brasil, and U.S. Open Cup)		Continental		Other		Total	
Club	Season	Division	Apps	Goals	Apps	Goals	Apps	Goals	Apps	Goals	Apps	Goals
Belgrano	2012–13	Argentine Primera División	0	0	0	0	–		–		0	0
Belgrano	2013–14	Argentine Primera División	26	1	1	0	0	0	–		27	1
Belgrano	2014	Argentine Primera División	16	3	0	0	–		–		16	3
Belgrano	2015	Argentine Primera División	31	4	1	0	1	0	–		33	4
Belgrano	Total		73	8	2	0	1	0	–		76	8
Independiente	2016	Argentine Primera División	16	4	2	0	4	1	–		22	5
Independiente	2016–17	Argentine Primera División	30	11	0	0	4	1	–		34	12
Independiente	Total		46	15	2	0	8	2	–		56	17
Zenit Saint Petersburg	2017–18	Russian Premier League	17	0	1	0	10 (Note: Appearance(s) in UEFA Europa League)	6	–		28	6
Zenit Saint Petersburg	2018–19	Russian Premier League	11	3	0	0	1	0	–		12	3
Zenit Saint Petersburg	2019–20	Russian Premier League	12	2	1	1	0	0	1 (Note: Appearance in Russian Super Cup)	0	14	3
Zenit Saint Petersburg	2020–21	Russian Premier League	7	0	0	0	0	0	1	0	8	0
Zenit Saint Petersburg	Total		47	5	2	1	11	6	2	0	62	12
Atalanta (loan)	2018–19	Serie A	12	3	0	0	0	0	–		12	3
Sampdoria (loan)	2019–20	Serie A	8	0	1	0	–		–		9	0
Elche (loan)	2020–21	La Liga	23	1	2	1	–		–		25	2
São Paulo	2021	Série A	30	4	5	5	3 (Note: Appearances in Copa Libertadores)	2	–		38	11
São Paulo	2022	Série A	11	0	2	0	7 (Note: Appearances in Copa Sudamericana)	0	12 (Note: Appearances in Campeonato Paulista)	2	32	2
São Paulo	Total		41	8	7	5	10	2	12	2	70	17
Austin FC	2022	MLS	7	0	0	0	–		3 (Note: Appearance(s) in MLS Cup Playoffs)	0	10	0
Austin FC	2023	MLS	33	5	2	0	2 (Note: Appearance(s) in CONCACAF Champions League)	0	0	0	37	5
Austin FC	2024	MLS	11	1	–		–		0	0	11	1
Austin FC	Total		51	6	2	0	2	0	3	0	58	6
Career total			292	41	17	7	32	10	17	2	360	60

=== International ===
As of match played 14 November 2017.

Appearances and goals by national team and year
National team	Year	Apps	Goals
Argentina	2017	2	0
Total		2	0

== Honours ==
Zenit Saint Petersburg

- Russian Premier League: 2018–19, 2019–20, 2020–21
- Russian Cup: 2019–20
- Russian Super Cup: 2020

Belgrano

- Primera División: 2026 Apertura
