= Jon Gallagher =

Irish footballer (born 1996)

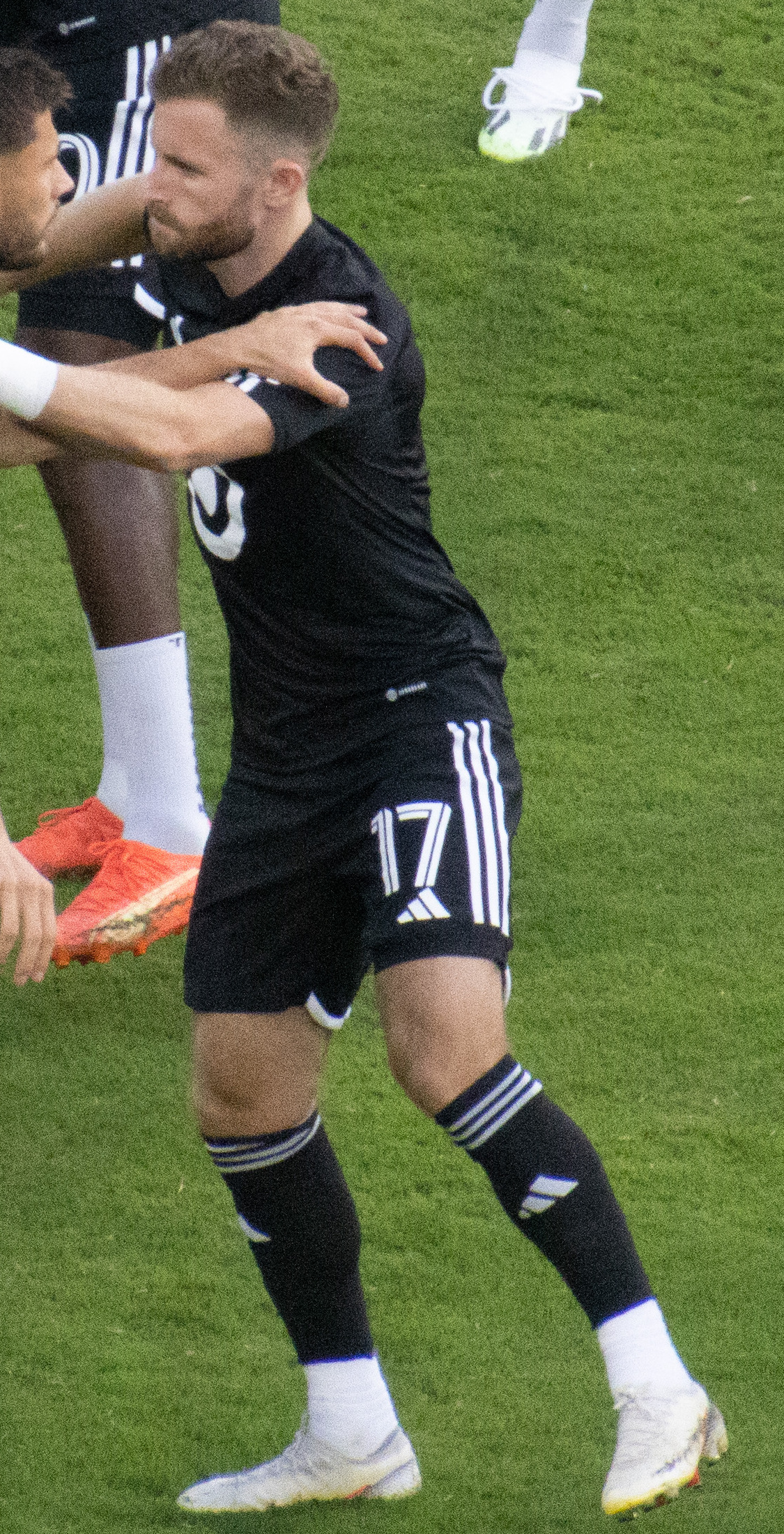
- Gallagher before the 2023 MLS All-Star Game

Personal information
- Date of birth: 23 February 1996 (age 30)
- Place of birth: Dundalk, Ireland
- Height: 1.75 m (5 ft 9 in)
- Positions: Right-back; midfielder; forward

Team information
- Current team: Austin FC
- Number: 17

Youth career
- 2008–2010: Beachside SC
- 2010–2012: Home United

College career
Years	Team	Apps	(Gls)
2014–2017	Notre Dame Fighting Irish	84	(39)

Senior career*
Years	Team	Apps	(Gls)
2018–2020	Atlanta United	16	(4)
2018–2019	Atlanta United 2	38	(7)
2019–2020	→ Aberdeen (loan)	22	(1)
2021–	Austin FC	193	(13)
- * Club domestic league appearances and goals as of 21:06, 8 November 2026 (UTC)

Jon Gallagher (born 23 February 1996) is an Irish professional footballer who plays as a forward for Major League Soccer club Austin FC. He can also play as a right-back or midfielder.

== Early life ==
Born in Dundalk in Ireland, growing up Gallagher also spent time in the United States, Jamaica, Singapore and England. While moving around, Gallagher played with Beachside SC in Connecticut, Home United in Singapore and England Schoolboys in England. He also spent time on trial with the likes of Juventus, Marseille, Newcastle United and Blackburn Rovers.

Gallagher played four years of college soccer at the University of Notre Dame between 2014 and 2017. In his senior year, he was named USC Second Team All-American, USC First Team All-South Region, First Team All-Atlantic Coast Conference, and Atlantic Coast Conference All-Tournament Team. Overall, Gallagher scored 39 goals and tallied 15 assists in 84 appearances for the Fighting Irish.

== Club career ==
Ahead of the 2018 Major League Soccer season, it was announced that Gallagher had signed a contract with Major League Soccer, making him eligible for the 2018 MLS SuperDraft. On 19 January 2018, Gallagher was selected 14th overall in the 2018 MLS SuperDraft by Atlanta United.

Gallagher made his professional debut on 24 March 2018, scoring two goals for Atlanta's United Soccer League affiliate side in a 3–1 win over New York Red Bulls II.

Gallagher was loaned to Scottish Premiership club Aberdeen from Atlanta United on 22 June 2019. The loan was initially for the remainder of the 2019 MLS season, but was subsequently extended to the end of the 2019–20 Scottish season. He played in 31 matches in all competitions for Aberdeen and scored his only goal against Rangers in a 2–2 draw on 4 December 2019.

Gallagher returned to play with the Atlanta United first team in the middle of the 2020 Season, where he made 16 total appearances and registered 4 goals.

Gallagher was traded to Austin FC in exchange for $225,000 in General Allocation Money on 13 December 2020, ahead of Austin's inaugural season in 2021.

Gallagher scored the first ever goal at Q2 Stadium for Austin FC on 1 July 2021. In 2022, he transitioned from winger to right-back and became a first team regular in this position. He scored his only goal of 2022 in a 4–3 comeback win against Sporting Kansas City.

In early 2023, Gallagher signed a four-year deal with Austin FC, keeping him at the club through 2026. He scored the team's second goal of the 2023 season in a 3–2 loss against St. Louis, coming off the bench. On 27 June 2023, it was announced that Gallgher was being recognized for his strong season, which include 5 goals and 3 assists, by being named to the 2023 MLS All-Star Game.

== Career statistics ==
As of matched played on 7 November 2026

Appearances and goals by club, season and competition
Club	Season	League			League Cup		National cup (Note: Appearance(s) in Scottish Cup and U.S. Open Cup)		Continental		Other		Total	
Club	Season	Division	Apps	Goals	Apps	Goals	Apps	Goals	Apps	Goals	Apps	Goals	Apps	Goals
Atlanta United 2	2018	USL Championship	30	6	—		—		—		—		30	6
Atlanta United 2	2019	USL Championship	8	1	—		—		—		—		8	1
Atlanta United 2	Total		38	7	—		—		—		—		38	7
Atlanta United	2019	Major League Soccer	0	0	—		—		—		—		0	0
Atlanta United	2020	Major League Soccer	16	4	—		—		—		—		16	4
Atlanta United	Total		16	4	—		—		—		—		16	4
Aberdeen (loan)	2019–20	Scottish Premiership	22	1	2 (Note: Appearance(s) in Scottish League Cup)	0	1	0	6 (Note: Appearanes in UEFA Europa League)	0	—		31	1
Austin FC	2021	Major League Soccer	27	3	—		—		—		—		27	3
Austin FC	2022	Major League Soccer	32	1	3 (Note: Appearance(s) in MLS Cup Playoffs)	0	1	0	—		—		36	1
Austin FC	2023	Major League Soccer	34	5	—		2	0	2 (Note: Appearances in CONCACAF Champions Cup)	0	2 (Note: Appearance(s) in Leagues Cup)	0	39	5
Austin FC	2024	Major League Soccer	32	3	—		—		—		3	0	35	3
Austin FC	2025	Major League Soccer	34	1	2	1	5	0	—		—		41	2
Austin FC	2026	Major League Soccer	33	0	0	0	0	0	—		4	1	37	1
Austin FC	Total		192	13	5	1	8	0	2	0	9	1	216	15
Career total			246	25	7	1	9	0	8	0	9	1	279	27

== Honours ==
Individual

- MLS All-Star: 2023
